= List of UK Rock & Metal Singles and Albums Charts number ones =

UK record charts published by the Official Charts Company

The UK Rock & Metal Singles Chart and UK Rock & Metal Albums Chart are record charts compiled in the United Kingdom by the Official Charts Company (OCC) to determine the 40 most popular singles and albums in the rock and heavy metal genres. The two charts are compiled by the OCC from digital downloads, physical record sales and audio streams in UK retail outlets. The charts have been published on the official OCC website since 1994. Previously, the UK Rock Singles chart, sometimes called the Metal Singles chart, that was compiled by CIN, which later became OCC, was published in Hit Music from September 1992 intermittently to February 1997 and interchangeably with the Rock and Metal Albums chart (which was sometimes under the title of Rock and Metal Singles chart) and also with the Indie Chart.

== Number ones ==
=== Singles chart ===
- List of UK Rock & Metal Singles Chart number ones of 1995
- List of UK Rock & Metal Singles Chart number ones of 1996
- List of UK Rock & Metal Singles Chart number ones of 1997
- List of UK Rock & Metal Singles Chart number ones of 1998
- List of UK Rock & Metal Singles Chart number ones of 1999
- List of UK Rock & Metal Singles Chart number ones of 2000
- List of UK Rock & Metal Singles Chart number ones of 2001
- List of UK Rock & Metal Singles Chart number ones of 2002
- List of UK Rock & Metal Singles Chart number ones of 2003
- List of UK Rock & Metal Singles Chart number ones of 2004
- List of UK Rock & Metal Singles Chart number ones of 2005
- List of UK Rock & Metal Singles Chart number ones of 2006
- List of UK Rock & Metal Singles Chart number ones of 2007
- List of UK Rock & Metal Singles Chart number ones of 2008
- List of UK Rock & Metal Singles Chart number ones of 2009
- List of UK Rock & Metal Singles Chart number ones of 2010
- List of UK Rock & Metal Singles Chart number ones of 2011
- List of UK Rock & Metal Singles Chart number ones of 2012
- List of UK Rock & Metal Singles Chart number ones of 2013
- List of UK Rock & Metal Singles Chart number ones of 2014
- List of UK Rock & Metal Singles Chart number ones of 2015
- List of UK Rock & Metal Singles Chart number ones of 2016
- List of UK Rock & Metal Singles Chart number ones of 2017
- List of UK Rock & Metal Singles Chart number ones of 2018
- List of UK Rock & Metal Singles Chart number ones of 2019
- List of UK Rock & Metal Singles Chart number ones of 2020
- List of UK Rock & Metal Singles Chart number ones of 2021
- List of UK Rock & Metal Singles Chart number ones of 2022
- List of UK Rock & Metal Singles Chart number ones of 2023
- List of UK Rock & Metal Singles Chart number ones of 2024
- List of UK Rock & Metal Singles Chart number ones of 2025
- List of UK Rock & Metal Singles Chart number ones of 2026

=== Albums chart ===
- List of UK Rock & Metal Albums Chart number ones of 1995
- List of UK Rock & Metal Albums Chart number ones of 1996
- List of UK Rock & Metal Albums Chart number ones of 1997
- List of UK Rock & Metal Albums Chart number ones of 1998
- List of UK Rock & Metal Albums Chart number ones of 1999
- List of UK Rock & Metal Albums Chart number ones of 2000
- List of UK Rock & Metal Albums Chart number ones of 2001
- List of UK Rock & Metal Albums Chart number ones of 2002
- List of UK Rock & Metal Albums Chart number ones of 2003
- List of UK Rock & Metal Albums Chart number ones of 2004
- List of UK Rock & Metal Albums Chart number ones of 2005
- List of UK Rock & Metal Albums Chart number ones of 2006
- List of UK Rock & Metal Albums Chart number ones of 2007
- List of UK Rock & Metal Albums Chart number ones of 2008
- List of UK Rock & Metal Albums Chart number ones of 2009
- List of UK Rock & Metal Albums Chart number ones of 2010
- List of UK Rock & Metal Albums Chart number ones of 2011
- List of UK Rock & Metal Albums Chart number ones of 2012
- List of UK Rock & Metal Albums Chart number ones of 2013
- List of UK Rock & Metal Albums Chart number ones of 2014
- List of UK Rock & Metal Albums Chart number ones of 2015
- List of UK Rock & Metal Albums Chart number ones of 2016
- List of UK Rock & Metal Albums Chart number ones of 2017
- List of UK Rock & Metal Albums Chart number ones of 2018
- List of UK Rock & Metal Albums Chart number ones of 2019
- List of UK Rock & Metal Albums Chart number ones of 2020
- List of UK Rock & Metal Albums Chart number ones of 2021
- List of UK Rock & Metal Albums Chart number ones of 2022
- List of UK Rock & Metal Albums Chart number ones of 2023
- List of UK Rock & Metal Albums Chart number ones of 2024
- List of UK Rock & Metal Albums Chart number ones of 2025
- List of UK Rock & Metal Albums Chart number ones of 2026

== See also ==
- List of artists by number of UK Rock & Metal Singles Chart number ones
- List of artists by number of UK Rock & Metal Albums Chart number ones

== Media Research Information Bureau charts ==
=== Singles ===
- List of UK Rock & Metal Singles Chart number ones of 1986
- List of UK Rock & Metal Singles Chart number ones of 1987
- List of UK Rock & Metal Singles Chart number ones of 1988
- List of UK Rock & Metal Singles Chart number ones of 1990
- List of UK Rock & Metal Singles Chart number ones of 1993
- List of UK Rock & Metal Singles Chart number ones of 1994

=== Albums ===
- List of UK Rock & Metal Albums Chart number ones of 1993
- List of UK Rock & Metal Albums Chart number ones of 1994
