= List of UK Rock & Metal Singles Chart number ones of 2009 =

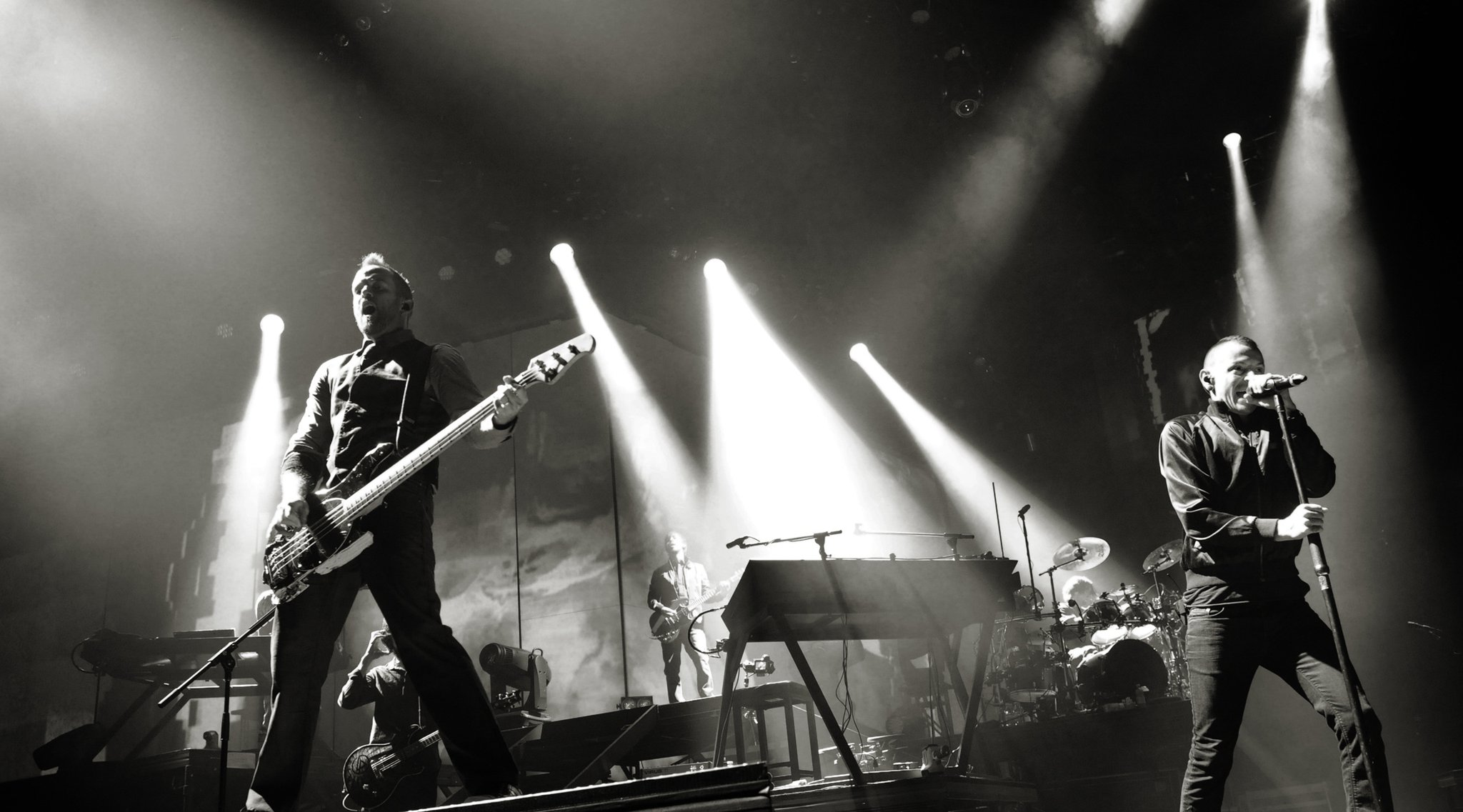
"New Divide" by Linkin Park was the longest-running number one of 2009, spending 13 weeks atop the chart.

The UK Rock & Metal Singles Chart is a record chart which ranks the best-selling rock and heavy metal songs in the United Kingdom. Compiled and published by the Official Charts Company, the data is based on each track's weekly physical sales, digital downloads and streams. In 2009, there were 18 singles that topped the 52 published charts. The first number-one single of the year was "Hand of Blood" by Welsh metalcore band Bullet for My Valentine, the lead single from the EP of the same name. The final number one of the year was "Killing in the Name" by American rap metal band Rage Against the Machine, which was the UK Singles Chart Christmas number one.

The most successful song on the UK Rock & Metal Singles Chart in 2009 was "New Divide" by American alternative rock band Linkin Park, which spent 13 consecutive weeks at number one. Muse spent seven weeks at number one in 2009, with "Undisclosed Desires" (four weeks), "Feeling Good" (two weeks) and "Supermassive Black Hole" (one week) all topping the chart. Bon Jovi's "Livin' on a Prayer" was number one for six weeks, Nickelback were number one for five weeks with "Gotta Be Somebody", "If Today Was Your Last Day" (two weeks each) and "I'd Come for You" (one week), and "Mercury Summer" by Fightstar and "Ignorance" by Paramore were number one for four weeks each. Biffy Clyro's "The Captain" was number one for three weeks, while songs by Kid Rock, Goo Goo Dolls and Lostprophets spent two weeks each atop the chart.

== Chart history ==
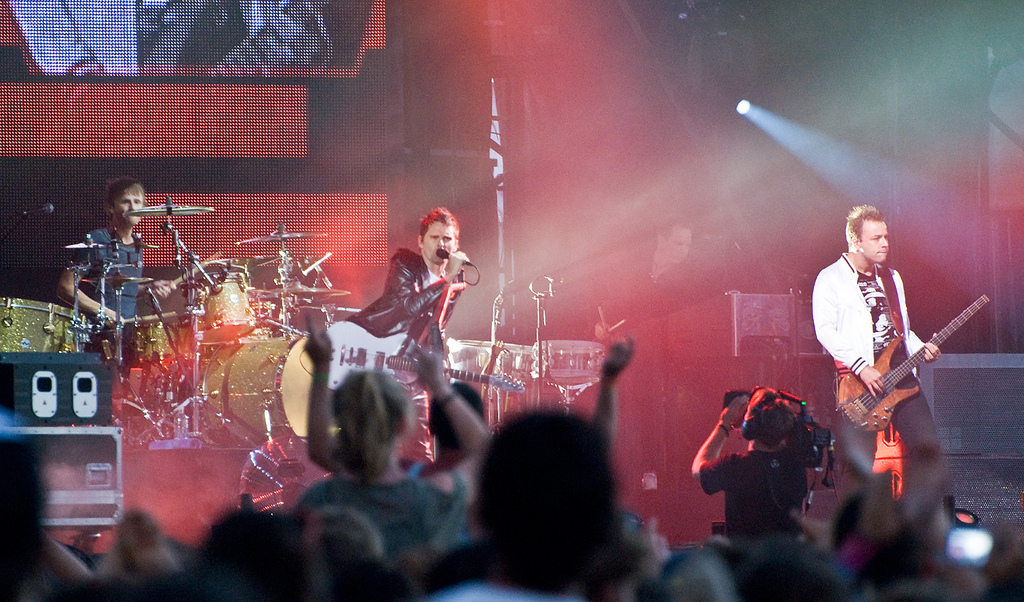
Muse spent seven weeks at number one with "Undisclosed Desires" (four weeks), "Feeling Good" (two weeks) and "Supermassive Black Hole" (one week).

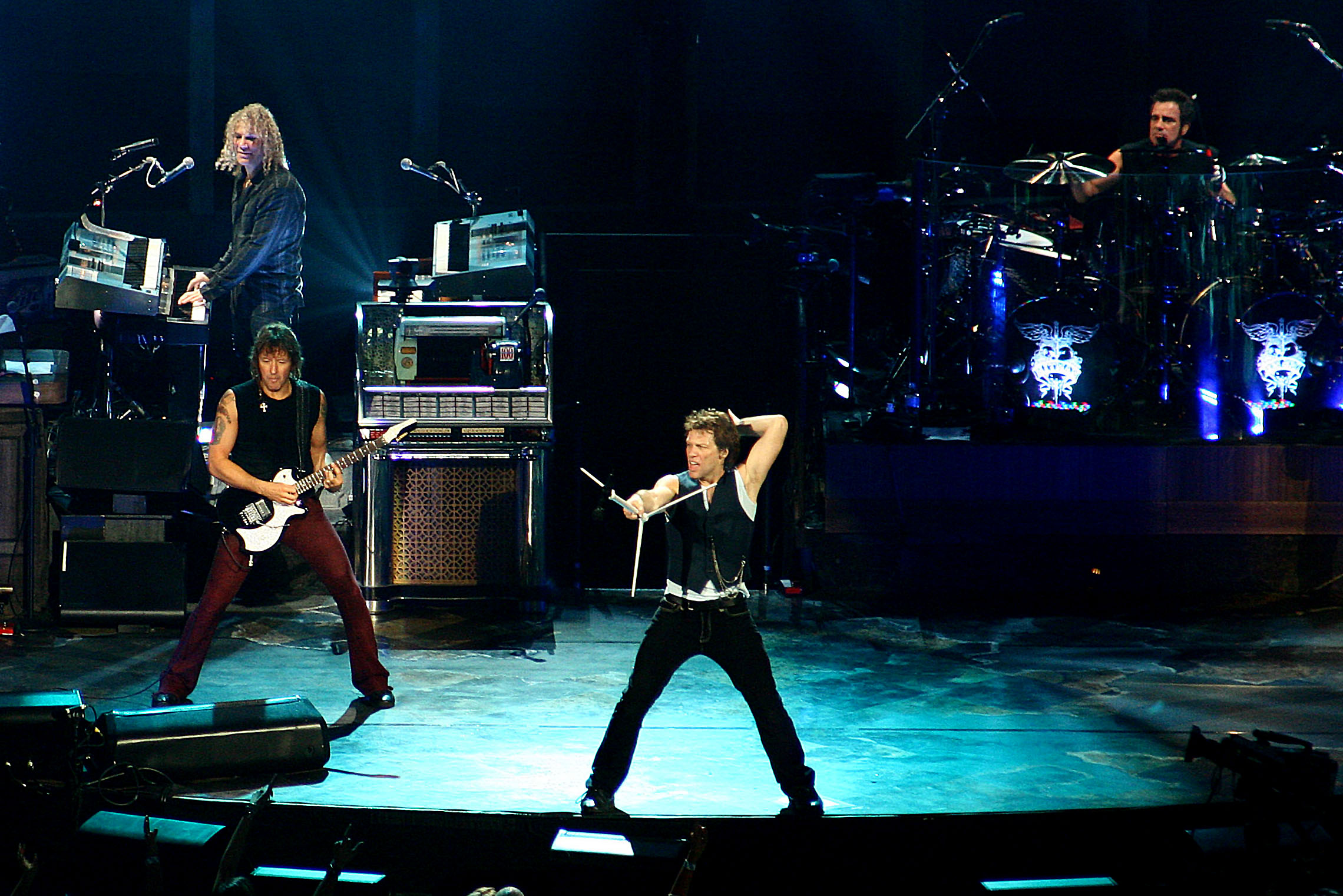
Bon Jovi's "Livin' on a Prayer" was number one for six weeks in 2009.

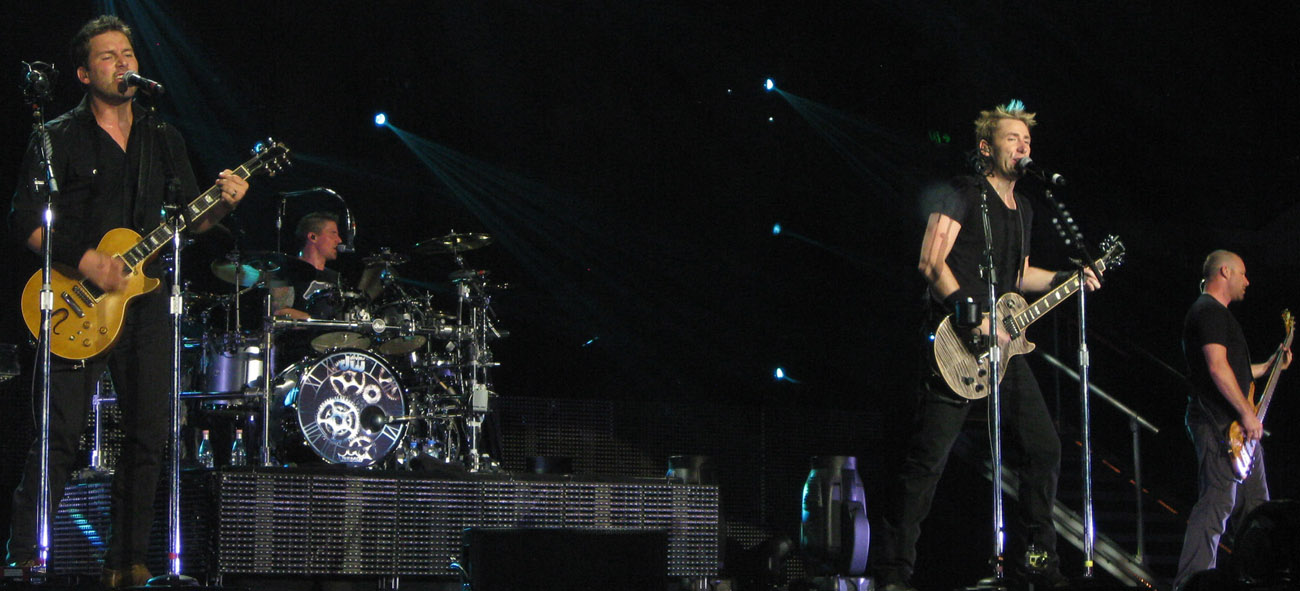
Nickelback spent five weeks at number one with "Gotta Be Somebody", "If Today Was Your Last Day" (two weeks each) and "I'd Come for You" (one week).

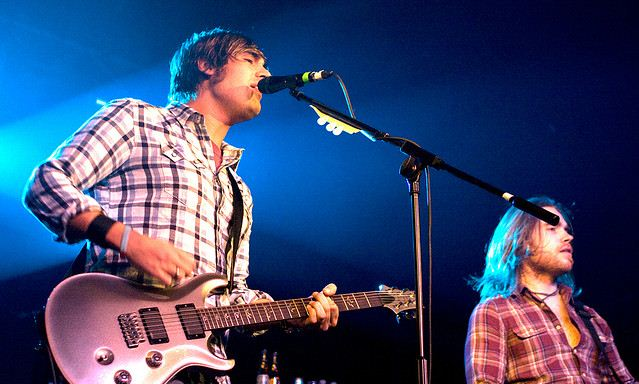
Fightstar's "Mercury Summer" was number one for four weeks in 2009.

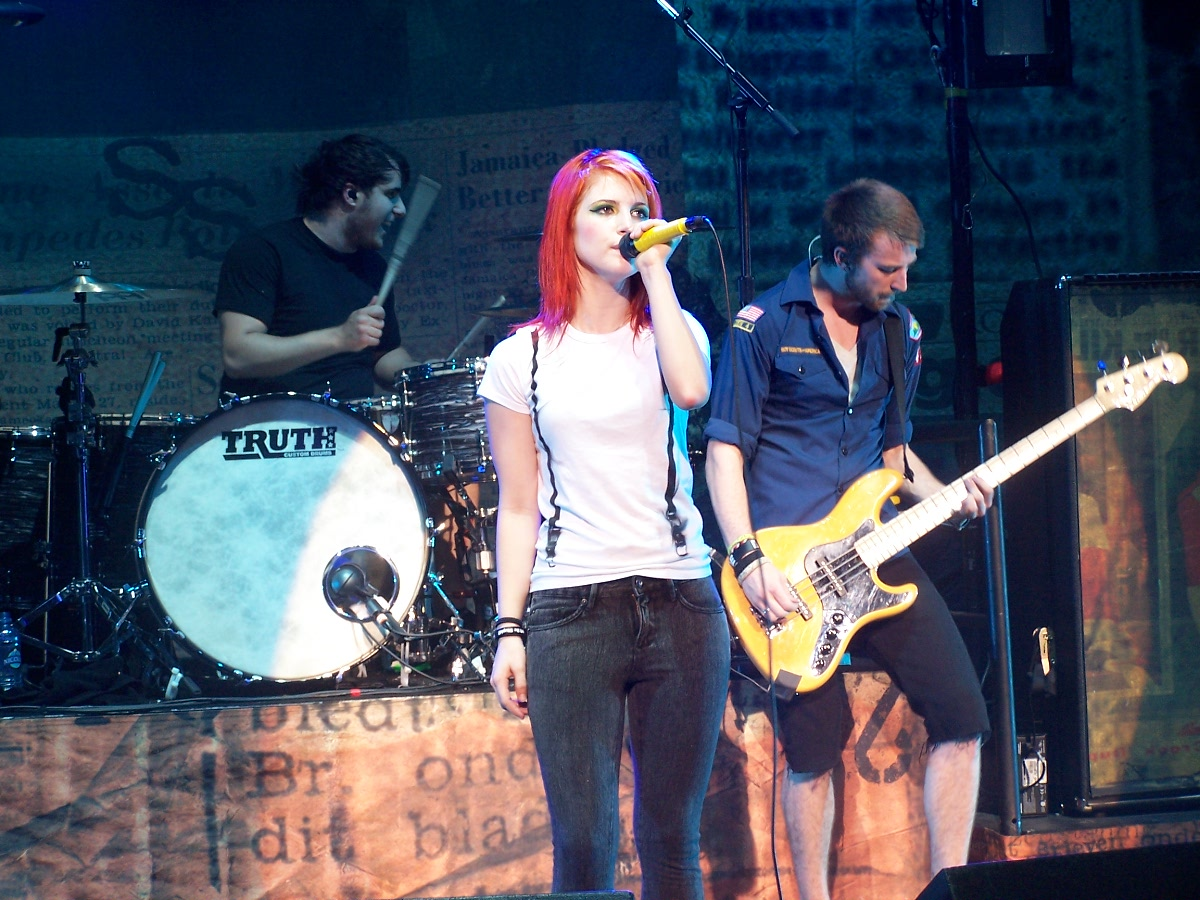
"Ignorance" by Paramore spent four weeks at number one in 2009.

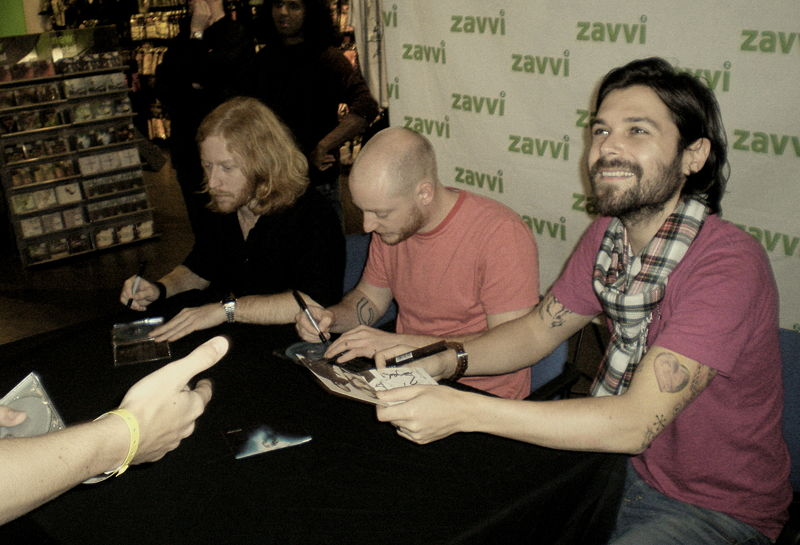
Biffy Clyro were number one for three weeks in 2009 with "The Captain".

Issue date	Single	Artist(s)	Record label(s)	Ref.
3 January	"Hand of Blood"	Bullet for My Valentine	Trustkill	
10 January	"All Summer Long"	Kid Rock	Atlantic	
17 January	"All Summer Long"	Kid Rock	Atlantic	
24 January	"Gotta Be Somebody"	Nickelback	Roadrunner	
31 January	"Gotta Be Somebody"	Nickelback	Roadrunner	
7 February	"Feeling Good"	Muse	A&E	
14 February	"Feeling Good"	Muse	A&E	
21 February	"Desolation Row"	My Chemical Romance	Reprise	
28 February	"Livin' on a Prayer"	Bon Jovi	Mercury	
7 March	"Livin' on a Prayer"	Bon Jovi	Mercury	
14 March	"Livin' on a Prayer"	Bon Jovi	Mercury	
21 March	"Livin' on a Prayer"	Bon Jovi	Mercury	
28 March	"Livin' on a Prayer"	Bon Jovi	Mercury	
4 April	"I'd Come for You"	Nickelback	Roadrunner	
11 April	"I'd Come for You"	Nickelback	Roadrunner	
18 April	"Mercury Summer"	Fightstar	Search and Destroy	
25 April	"Mercury Summer"	Fightstar	Search and Destroy	
2 May	"Mercury Summer"	Fightstar	Search and Destroy	
9 May	"Mercury Summer"	Fightstar	Search and Destroy	
16 May	"Iris"	Goo Goo Dolls	Warner Bros.	
23 May	"Livin' on a Prayer"	Bon Jovi	Mercury	
30 May	"Children of the Night"	The Blackout	Epitaph	
6 June	"Iris"	Goo Goo Dolls	Warner Bros.	
13 June	"If Today Was Your Last Day"	Nickelback	Roadrunner	
20 June	"New Divide"	Linkin Park	Warner Bros.	
27 June	"New Divide"	Linkin Park	Warner Bros.	
4 July	"New Divide"	Linkin Park	Warner Bros.	
11 July	"New Divide"	Linkin Park	Warner Bros.	
18 July	"New Divide"	Linkin Park	Warner Bros.	
25 July	"New Divide"	Linkin Park	Warner Bros.	
1 August	"New Divide"	Linkin Park	Warner Bros.	
8 August	"New Divide"	Linkin Park	Warner Bros.	
15 August	"New Divide"	Linkin Park	Warner Bros.	
22 August	"New Divide"	Linkin Park	Warner Bros.	
29 August	"New Divide"	Linkin Park	Warner Bros.	
5 September	"New Divide"	Linkin Park	Warner Bros.	
12 September	"New Divide"	Linkin Park	Warner Bros.	
19 September	"Supermassive Black Hole"	Muse	A&E	
26 September	"Ignorance"	Paramore	Fueled by Ramen	
3 October	"Ignorance"	Paramore	Fueled by Ramen	
10 October	"Ignorance"	Paramore	Fueled by Ramen	
17 October	"Ignorance"	Paramore	Fueled by Ramen	
24 October	"It's Not the End of the World, But I Can See It from Here"	Lostprophets	Visible Noise	
31 October	"It's Not the End of the World, But I Can See It from Here"	Lostprophets	Visible Noise	
7 November	"The Captain"	Biffy Clyro	14th Floor	
14 November	"The Captain"	Biffy Clyro	14th Floor	
21 November	"The Captain"	Biffy Clyro	14th Floor	
28 November	"Undisclosed Desires"	Muse	Warner Bros.	
5 December	"Undisclosed Desires"	Muse	Warner Bros.	
12 December	"Undisclosed Desires"	Muse	Warner Bros.	
19 December	"Undisclosed Desires"	Muse	Warner Bros.	
26 December	"Killing in the Name"	Rage Against the Machine	Epic	

== See also ==
- 2009 in British music
- List of UK Rock & Metal Albums Chart number ones of 2009
