= List of UK Rock & Metal Albums Chart number ones of 2009 =

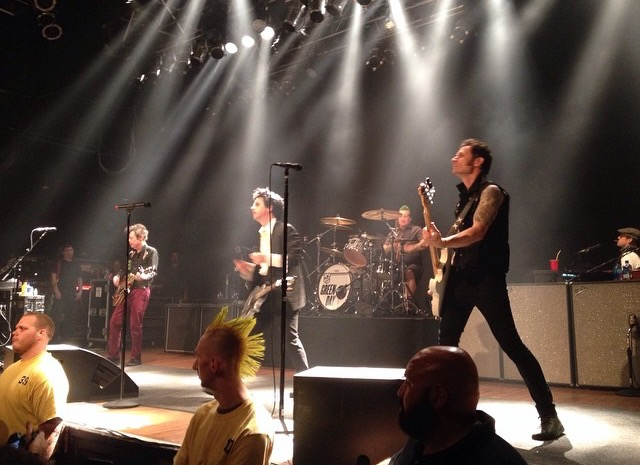
Green Day's eighth studio album 21st Century Breakdown was the longest-running number-one album of 2009, spending eleven weeks atop the chart.

The UK Rock & Metal Albums Chart is a record chart which ranks the best-selling rock and heavy metal albums in the United Kingdom. Compiled and published by the Official Charts Company, the data is based on each album's weekly physical sales, digital downloads and streams. In 2009, there were 23 albums that topped the 52 published charts. The first number-one album of the year was Chinese Democracy by Guns N' Roses, which reached the top of the chart for the week ending 6 December 2008 and remained at number one for six consecutive weeks. The final number-one album of the year was the Foo Fighters compilation album Greatest Hits, which first topped the chart for two weeks beginning in the week ending 14 November and returned for a four-week run at the end of the year.

The most successful album on the UK Rock & Metal Albums Chart in 2009 was Green Day's eighth studio album 21st Century Breakdown, which spent a total of eleven weeks at number one over five separate runs during the year. Nickelback's fifth studio album All the Right Reasons and Greatest Hits by Foo Fighters each spent six weeks at number one during 2009, while Muse's fifth studio album The Resistance was number one for a total of five weeks. The Resistance was also the best-selling rock and metal album of the year in the UK, ranking 25th in the UK End of Year Albums Chart. Appetite for Destruction by Guns N' Roses was number one for three weeks in 2009, while Chinese Democracy, Kerrang! The Album '09 and Paramore's Brand New Eyes each spent two weeks at number one.

== Chart history ==
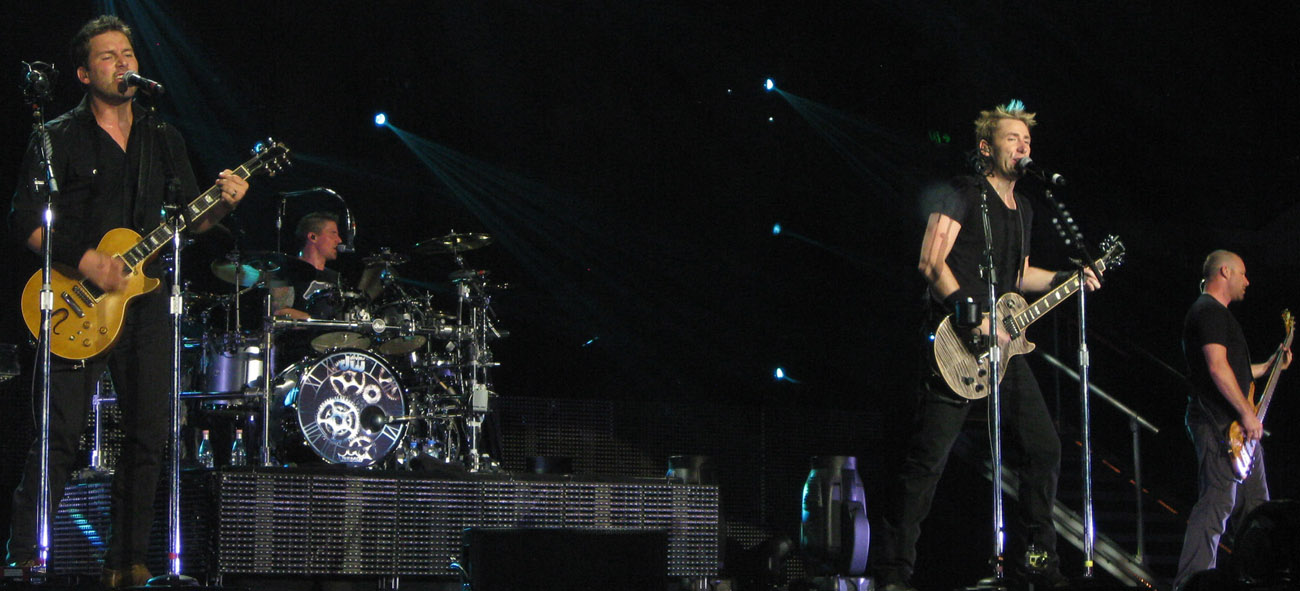
Nickelback's fifth studio album All the Right Reasons spent six weeks at number one in 2009, while the 2008 release Dark Horse also returned to the top spot.

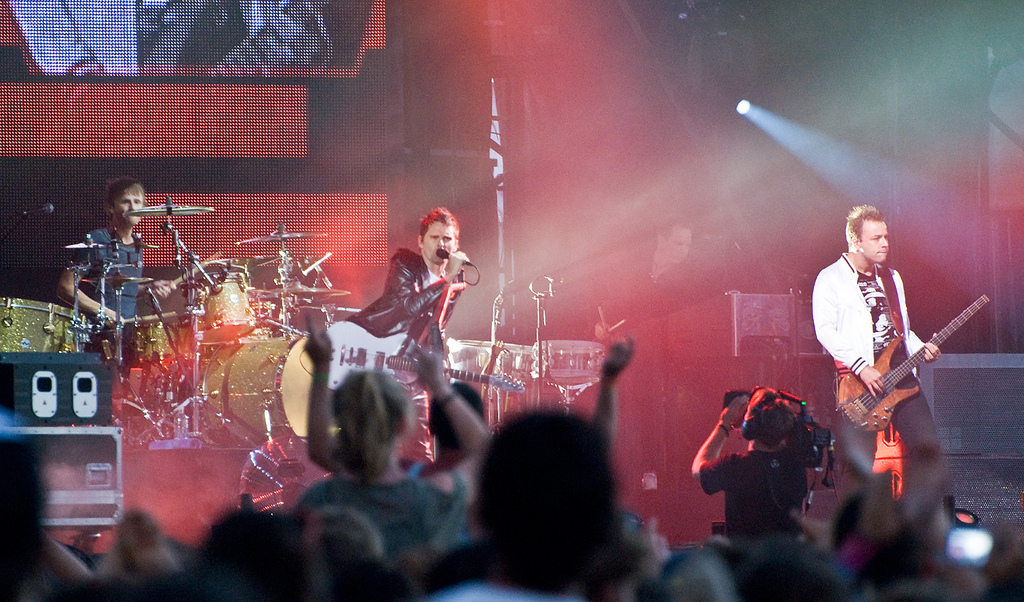
The Resistance by Muse spent five weeks at number one in 2009, and was the best-selling rock and metal album of the year in the UK. The band's 2006 release Black Holes and Revelations also returned to number one for a week.

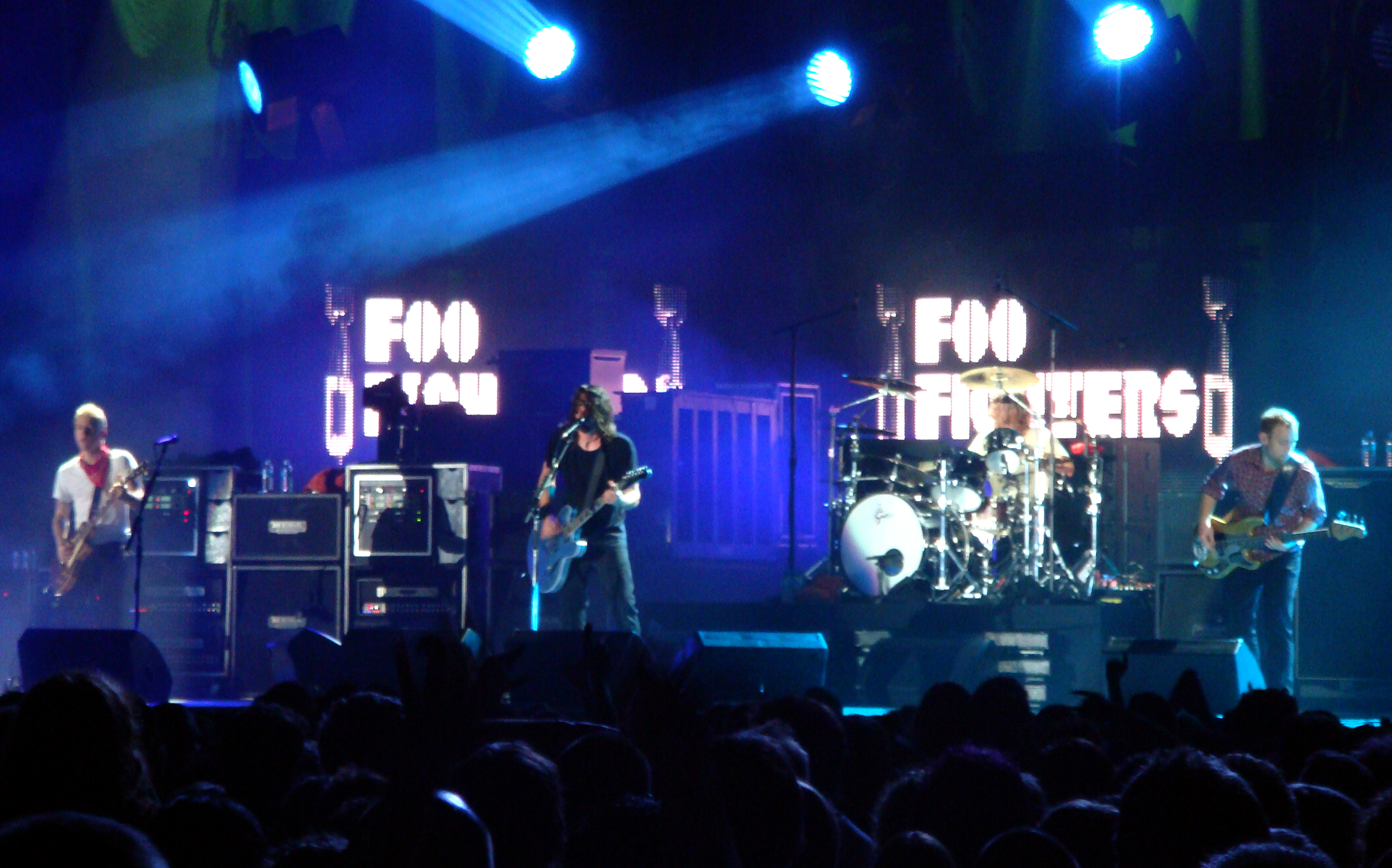
Foo Fighters were number one for six weeks in November and December 2009 with their Greatest Hits compilation.

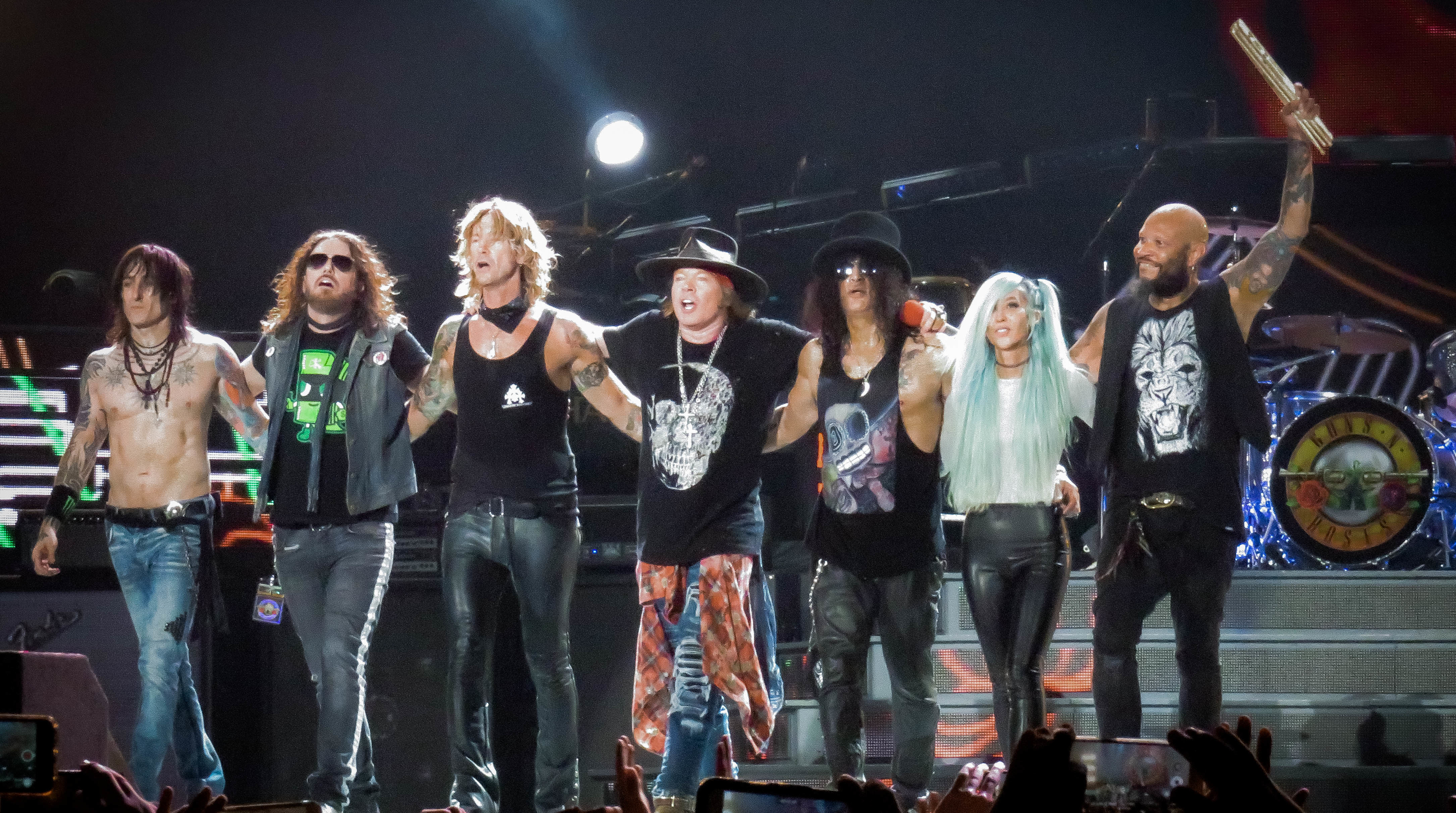
Guns N' Roses topped the UK Rock & Metal Albums Chart with two releases in 2009 – debut Appetite for Destruction (three weeks) and latest release Chinese Democracy (two weeks).

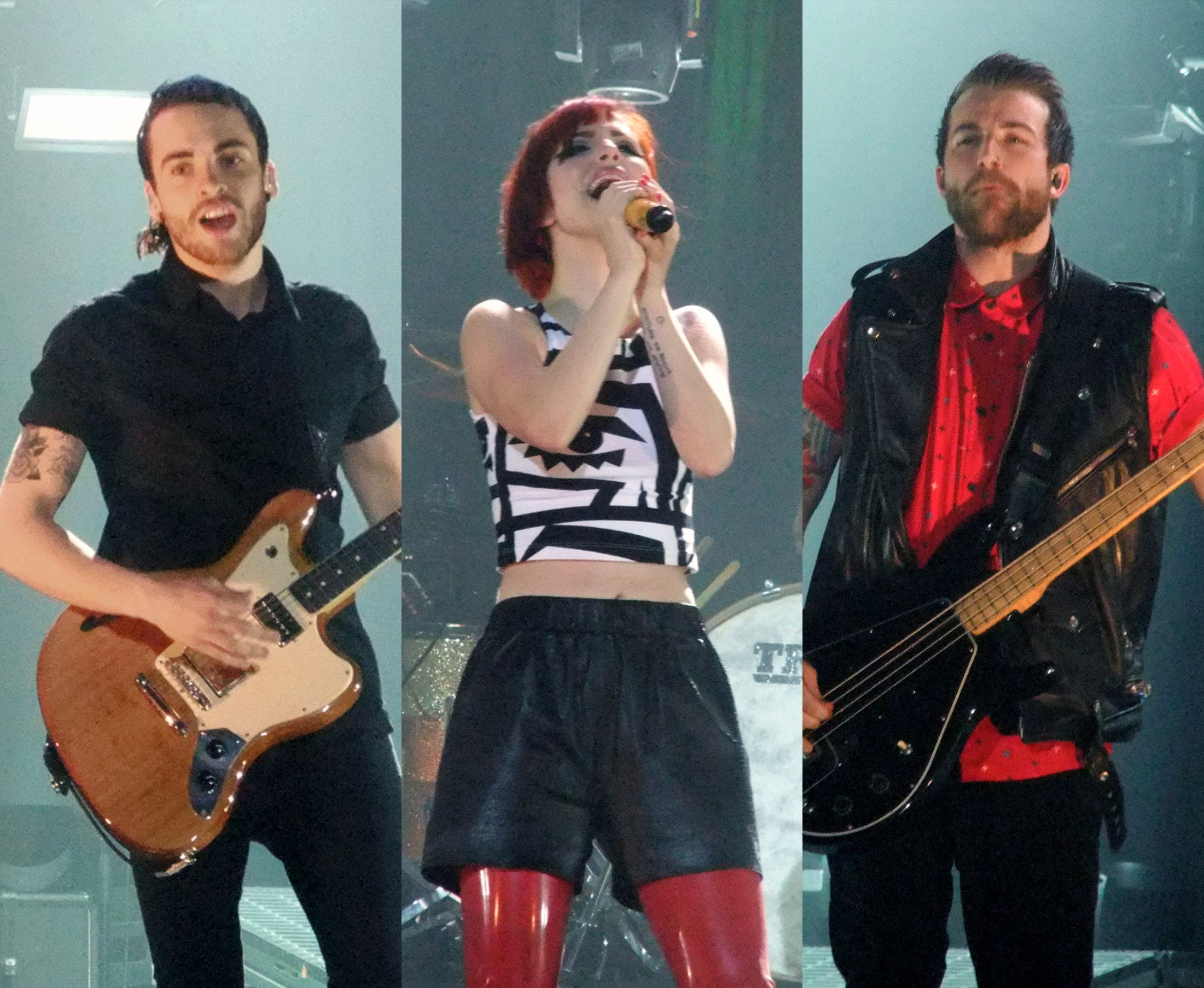
Paramore's third studio album Brand New Eyes spent two consecutive weeks at number one in October 2009.

Key
†	Indicates best-selling rock album of 2009

Issue date	Album	Artist(s)	Record label(s)	Ref.
3 January	Chinese Democracy	Guns N' Roses	Black Frog/Geffen	
10 January	Chinese Democracy	Guns N' Roses	Black Frog/Geffen	
17 January	All the Right Reasons	Nickelback	Roadrunner	
24 January	All the Right Reasons	Nickelback	Roadrunner	
31 January	All the Right Reasons	Nickelback	Roadrunner	
7 February	All the Right Reasons	Nickelback	Roadrunner	
14 February	Greatest Hits	Guns N' Roses	Geffen	
21 February	All the Right Reasons	Nickelback	Roadrunner	
28 February	All the Right Reasons	Nickelback	Roadrunner	
7 March	Wrath	Lamb of God	Roadrunner	
14 March	Everyday Demons	The Answer	Albert	
21 March	Not Without a Fight	New Found Glory	Epitaph	
28 March	Dark Horse	Nickelback	Roadrunner	
4 April	Crack the Skye	Mastodon	Warner Bros.	
11 April	Appetite for Destruction	Guns N' Roses	Geffen	
18 April	Appetite for Destruction	Guns N' Roses	Geffen	
25 April	Appetite for Destruction	Guns N' Roses	Geffen	
2 May	Be Human	Fightstar	Search and Destroy	
9 May	The Devil You Know	Heaven & Hell	Roadrunner	
16 May	Attics to Eden	Madina Lake	Roadrunner	
23 May	21st Century Breakdown	Green Day	Reprise	
30 May	21st Century Breakdown	Green Day	Reprise	
6 June	21st Century Breakdown	Green Day	Reprise	
13 June	21st Century Breakdown	Green Day	Reprise	
20 June	Chickenfoot	Chickenfoot	earMusic	
27 June	21st Century Breakdown	Green Day	Reprise	
4 July	21st Century Breakdown	Green Day	Reprise	
11 July	Killswitch Engage	Killswitch Engage	Roadrunner	
18 July	21st Century Breakdown	Green Day	Reprise	
25 July	Billy Talent III	Billy Talent	Atlantic	
1 August	21st Century Breakdown	Green Day	Reprise	
8 August	21st Century Breakdown	Green Day	Reprise	
15 August	Kerrang! The Album '09	Various artists	Rhino	
22 August	Kerrang! The Album '09	Various artists	Rhino	
29 August	21st Century Breakdown	Green Day	Reprise	
5 September	21st Century Breakdown	Green Day	Reprise	
12 September	¡Chutzpah!	The Wildhearts	Backstage Alliance	
19 September	Black Holes and Revelations	Muse	Helium 3/Warner Bros.	
26 September	The Resistance †	Muse	Helium 3/Warner Bros.	
3 October	The Resistance †	Muse	Helium 3/Warner Bros.	
10 October	Brand New Eyes	Paramore	Fueled by Ramen	
17 October	Brand New Eyes	Paramore	Fueled by Ramen	
24 October	The Resistance †	Muse	Helium 3/Warner Bros.	
31 October	The Resistance †	Muse	Helium 3/Warner Bros.	
7 November	The Resistance †	Muse	Helium 3/Warner Bros.	
14 November	Greatest Hits	Foo Fighters	RCA	
21 November	Greatest Hits	Foo Fighters	RCA	
28 November	Them Crooked Vultures	Them Crooked Vultures	RCA	
5 December	Greatest Hits	Foo Fighters	RCA	
12 December	Greatest Hits	Foo Fighters	RCA	
19 December	Greatest Hits	Foo Fighters	RCA	
26 December	Greatest Hits	Foo Fighters	RCA	

== See also ==
- 2009 in British music
- List of UK Rock & Metal Singles Chart number ones of 2009
