= List of UK Rock & Metal Singles Chart number ones of 1990 =

These are the UK Rock & Metal Singles Chart number-one hits of the 1990 as compiled by MRIB.

Issue date	Song	Artist
6 January	"Big Wedge"	Fish
13 January	"Hey You"	The Quireboys
20 January	"Hey You"	The Quireboys
27 January	"No More Mr. Nice Guy"	Megadeth
3 February	"No More Mr. Nice Guy"	Megadeth
10 February	"18 and Life"	Skid Row
17 February	"18 and Life"	Skid Row
24 February	"18 and Life"	Skid Row
2 March	"18 and Life"	Skid Row
9 March	"How Am I Supposed to Live Without You"	Michael Bolton
16 March	"How Am I Supposed to Live Without You"	Michael Bolton
23 March	"A Gentleman's Excuse Me"	Fish
30 March	"All I Wanna Do Is Make Love to You"	Heart
7 April	"I Remember You"	Skid Row
14 April	"I Don't Love You Anymore"	The Quireboys
21 April	"Black Velvet"	Alannah Myles
28 April	"Black Velvet"	Alannah Myles
5 May	"Black Velvet"	Alannah Myles
12 May	"Black Velvet"	Alannah Myles
19 May	"Tattooed Millionaire"	Bruce Dickinson
26 May	"Backstreet Symphony"	Thunder
2 June	"Radical You Lover"	Little Angels
9 June	"Still Got the Blues (For You)"	Gary Moore
16 June	"I'll See You in My Dreams"	Giant
23 June	"Jealous Again"	The Black Crowes
30 June	"Victims of Success"	The Dogs D'Amour
7 July	"Unskinny Bop"	Poison
14 July	"Unskinny Bop"	Poison
21 July	"Unskinny Bop"	Poison
28 July	"Unskinny Bop"	Poison
4 August	"Unskinny Bop"	Poison

== See also ==
- 1990 in British music
