= List of UK Rock & Metal Singles Chart number ones of 1994 =

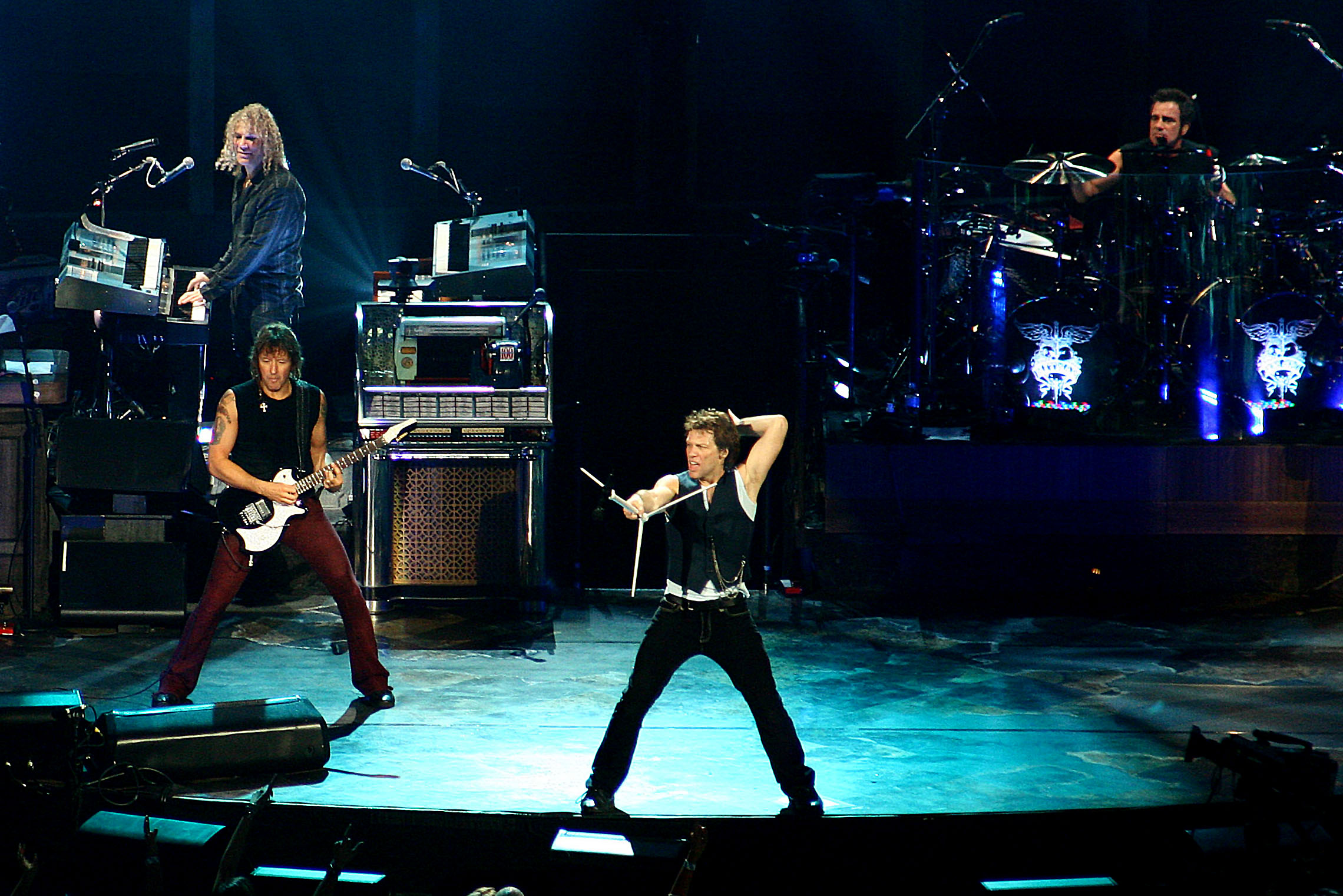
Always by Bon Jovi was the longest-running number-one rock single of 1994, spending eight weeks atop the chart. It ended 1994 as the sixth best-selling single of the year in the UK.

The UK Rock & Metal Singles Chart is a record chart which ranks the best-selling rock and heavy metal singles in the United Kingdom. In 1994, the chart was compiled by Gallup and published in Hit Music magazine every two weeks. During the year, 26 charts were published with 22 singles at number one. The first number-one single of the year was "I'd Do Anything for Love (But I Won't Do That)" by Meat Loaf. The last number-one single of the year was "Please Come Home for Christmas" by Bon Jovi. "Always" by Bon Jovi was the most successful single of the year on the chart, spending eight weeks at number one, finishing the year as the sixth best-selling single in the UK.

== Chart history ==
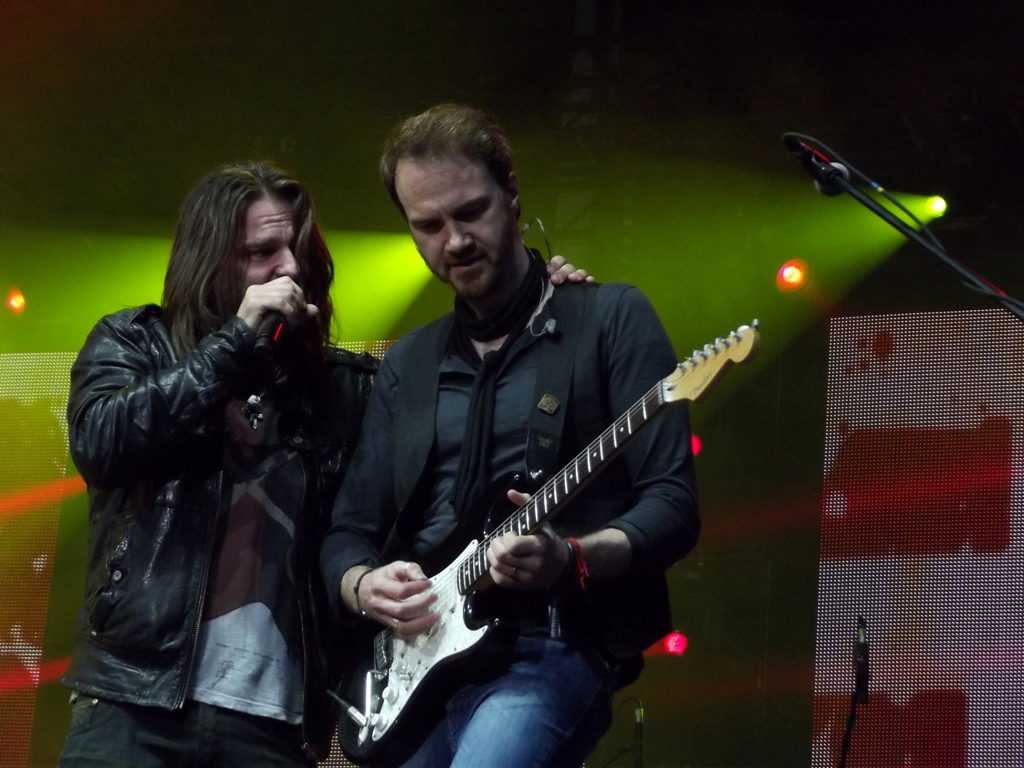
Stiltskin spent four weeks at number one with their debut single, "Inside".

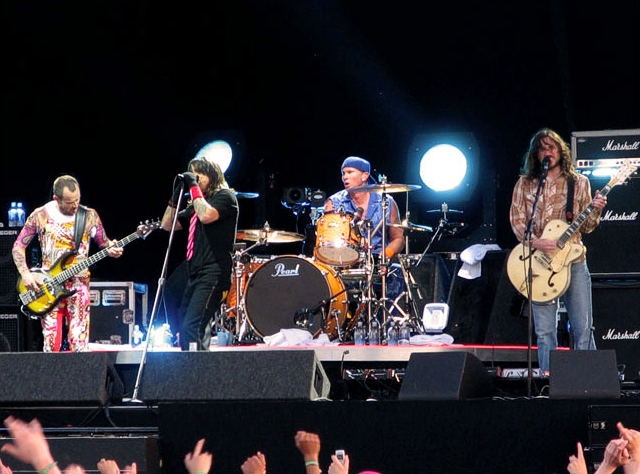
Red Hot Chili Peppers had two number-one singles in 1994: "Give It Away" and "Under the Bridge".

Key
†	Indicates best-selling rock single of 1994

Issue date	Single	Artist(s)	Record label(s)	Ref.
8 January	"I'd Do Anything for Love (But I Won't Do That)"	Meat Loaf	Virgin	
22 January	"All for Love"	Bryan Adams	A&M	
5 February	"Give It Away"	Red Hot Chili Peppers	Warner Bros.	
19 February	"Caffeine Bomb"	The Wildhearts	East West	
5 March	"Hooligan's Holiday"	Mötley Crüe	Elektra	
19 March	"I'm Broken"	Pantera	East West	
2 April	"Dry County"	Bon Jovi	Jambco	
16 April	"Oblivion"	Terrorvision	Total Vegas	
30 April	"Under the Bridge"	Red Hot Chili Peppers	Warner Bros.	
14 May	"Inside"	Stiltskin	White Water	
28 May	"Inside"	Stiltskin	White Water	
11 June	"Since I Don't Have You"	Guns N' Roses	Geffen	
25 June	"Middleman"	Terrorvision	Total Vegas	
9 July	"Word Up"	Gun	A&M	
23 July	"Tower of Strength"	Skin	Parlophone	
6 August	"Is This Love/Sweet Lady Luck"	Whitesnake	EMI	
20 August	"Black Hole Sun"	Soundgarden	A&M	
3 September	"Pretend Best Friend"	Terrorvision	Total Vegas	
17 September	"Liar/Disconnect"	Rollins Band	Imago	
1 October	"Always" †	Bon Jovi	Jambco	
15 October	"Always" †	Bon Jovi	Jambco	
29 October	"Always" †	Bon Jovi	Jambco	
12 November	"Always" †	Bon Jovi	Jambco	
26 November	"Spin the Black Circle"	Pearl Jam	Epic	
10 December	"Love Spreads"	The Stone Roses	Geffen	
24 December	"Please Come Home for Christmas"	Bon Jovi	Jambco	

== See also ==
- 1994 in British music
- List of UK Rock & Metal Albums Chart number ones of 1994
