= List of UK Rock & Metal Albums Chart number ones of 2010 =

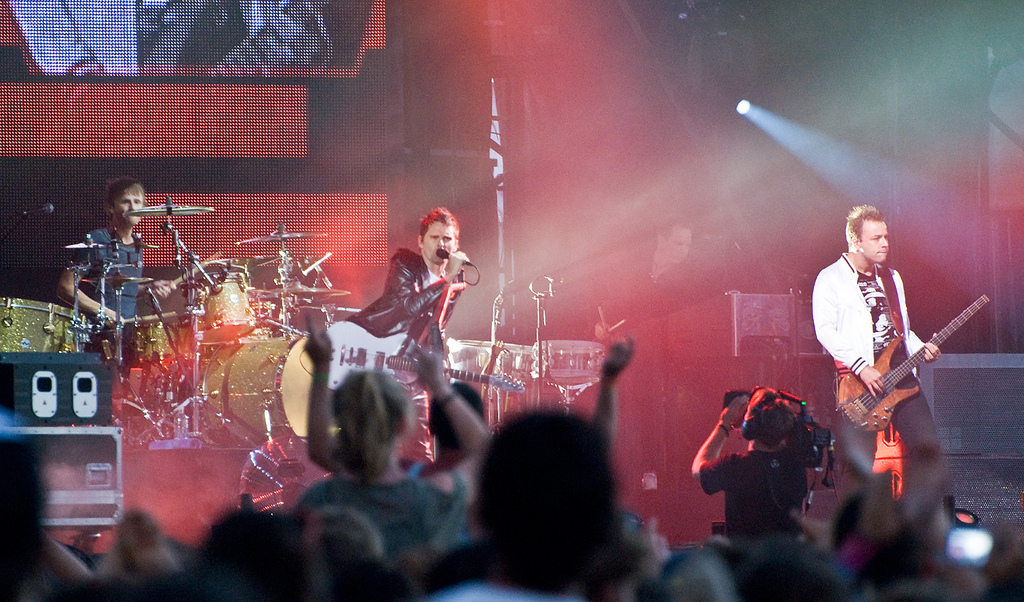
Muse's 2009 fifth studio album The Resistance was the longest-running number-one album of 2010, spending 11 weeks atop the chart.

The UK Rock & Metal Albums Chart is a record chart which ranks the best-selling rock and heavy metal albums in the United Kingdom. Compiled and published by the Official Charts Company, the data is based on each album's weekly physical sales, digital downloads and streams. In 2010, there were 22 albums that topped the 52 published charts. The first number-one album of the year was Muse's fifth studio album The Resistance, which was released the previous year. The first new number-one album of the year was Screamworks: Love in Theory and Practice, the seventh studio album by Finnish gothic rock band HIM. The final number-one album of the year was the Foo Fighters compilation Greatest Hits, which topped the chart for a total of four weeks over four separate spells in 2010.

The most successful album on the UK Rock & Metal Albums Chart in 2010 was Muse's 2009 release The Resistance, which spent a total of eleven weeks at number one. Led Zeppelin's 2007 compilation Mothership spent six weeks at number one in 2011, including a three-week run between 30 October and 13 November. AC/DC's Iron Man 2 soundtrack spent five weeks at number one and was the best-selling rock and metal album of the year, ranking 39th in the UK End of Year Albums Chart. Greatest Hits by Foo Fighters and the eponymous debut solo album by guitarist Slash each spent four weeks at number one; Linkin Park's A Thousand Suns and Avenged Sevenfold's Nightmare were both number one for three weeks; and Iron Maiden's The Final Frontier spent two weeks at number one in 2010.

== Chart history ==
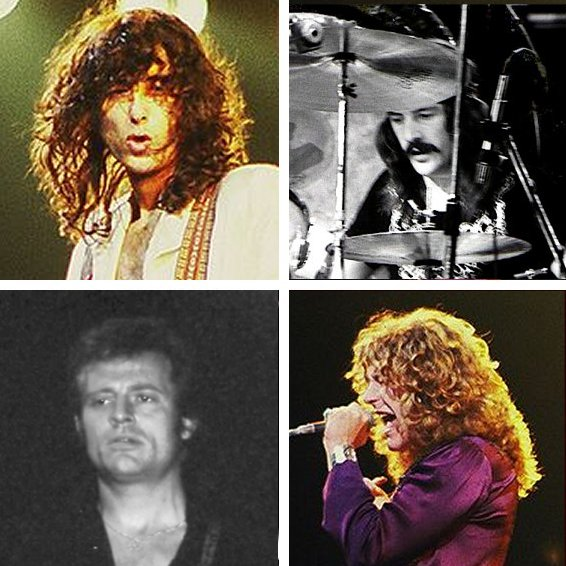
Led Zeppelin's Mothership was number one on the UK Rock & Metal Albums Chart for six weeks in 2010.

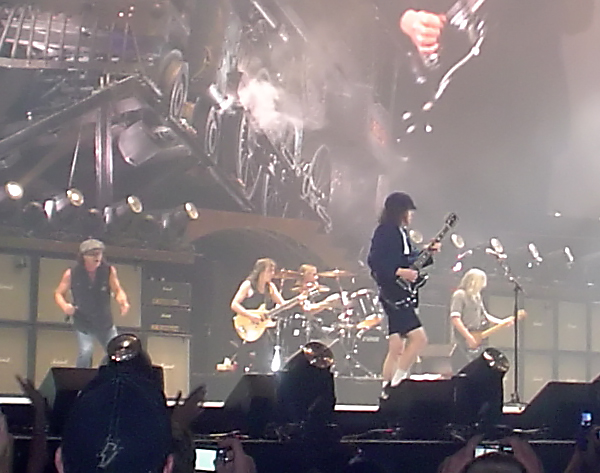
The Iron Man 2 soundtrack by AC/DC spent five weeks at number one in 2010 and was the best-selling rock and metal album of the year in the UK.

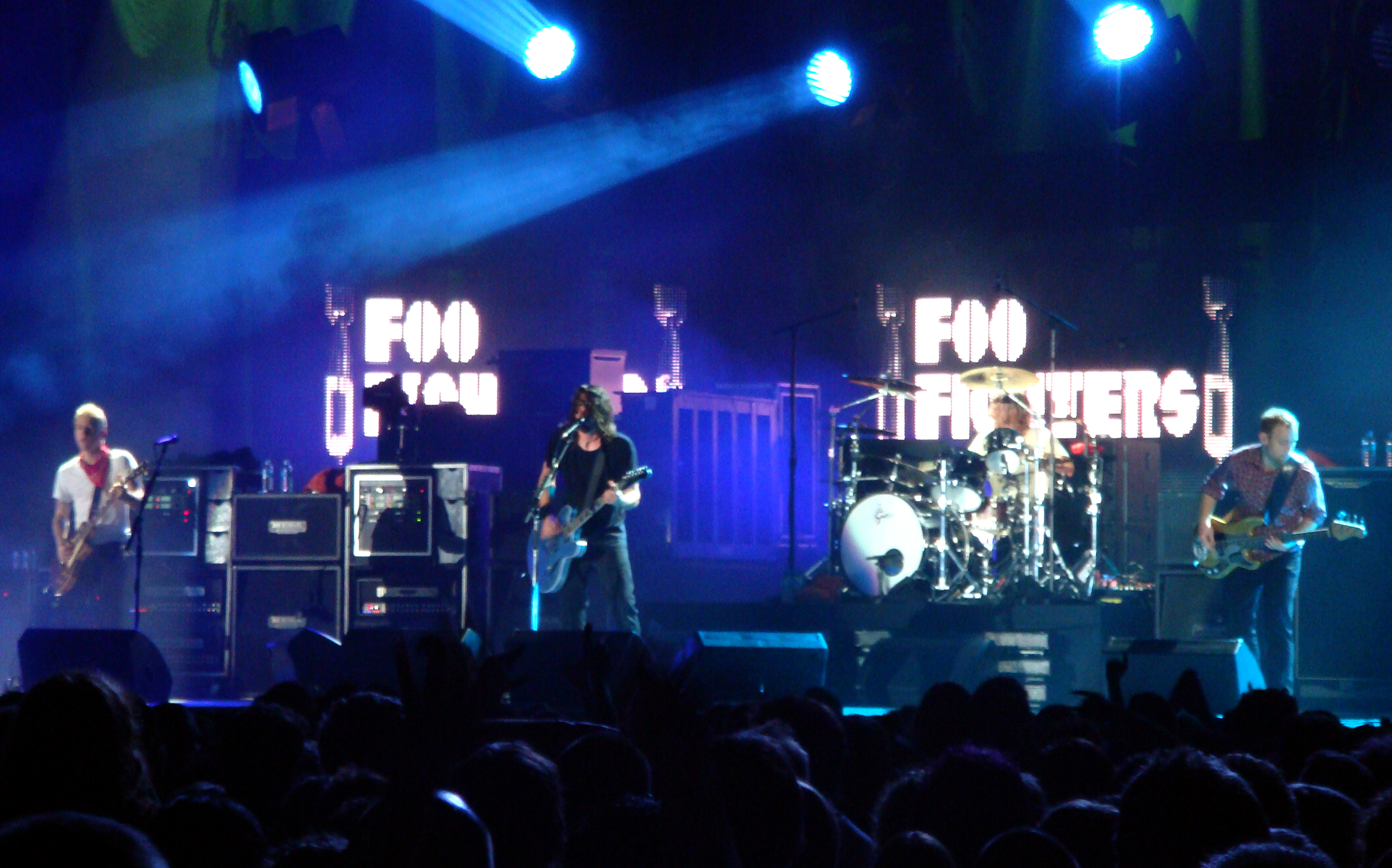
Foo Fighters spent four weeks at number one on the chart with the band's 2009 compilation Greatest Hits.

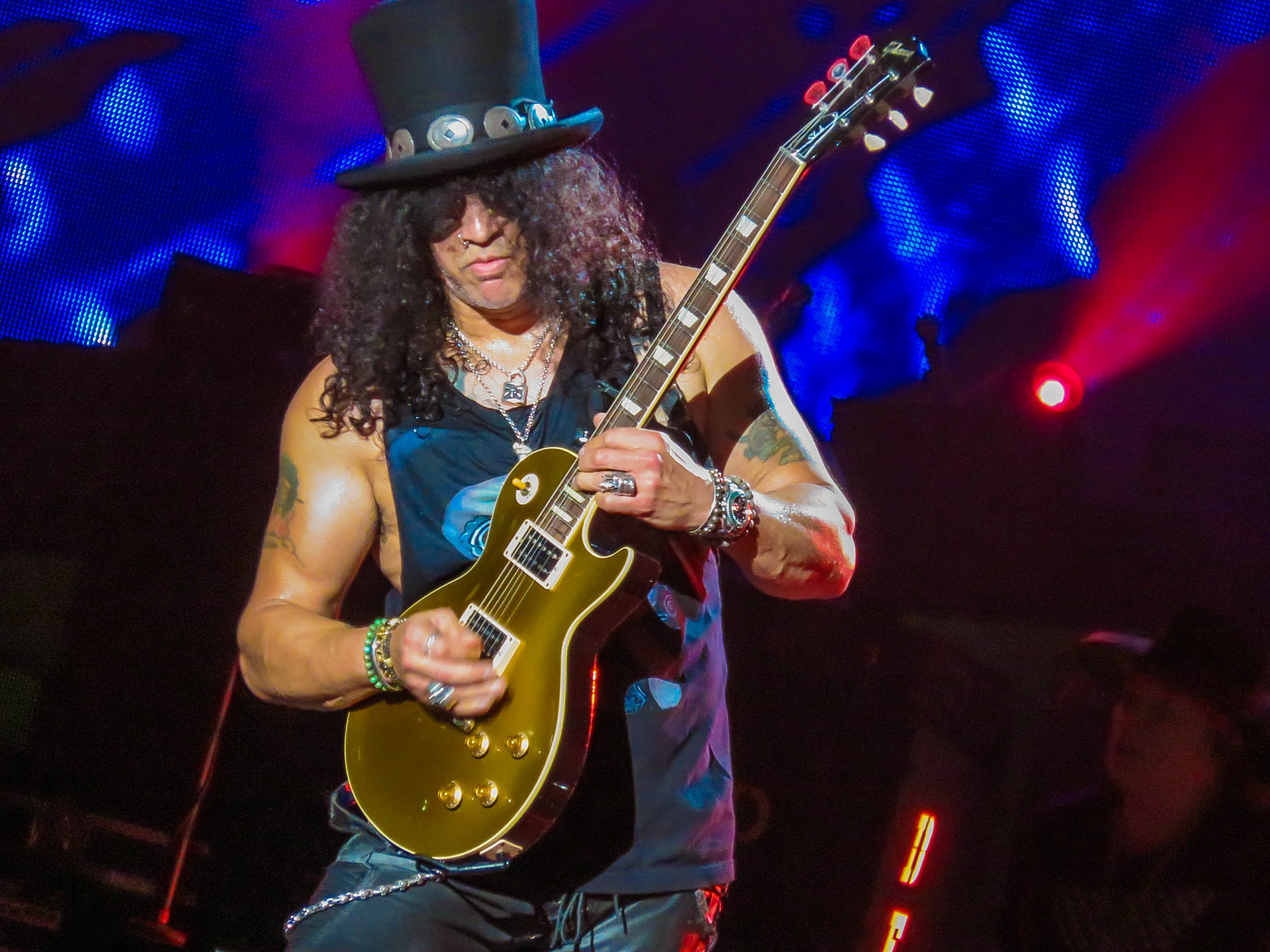
Slash, the eponymous debut solo album by guitarist Slash, spent a total of four weeks at number one in 2010.

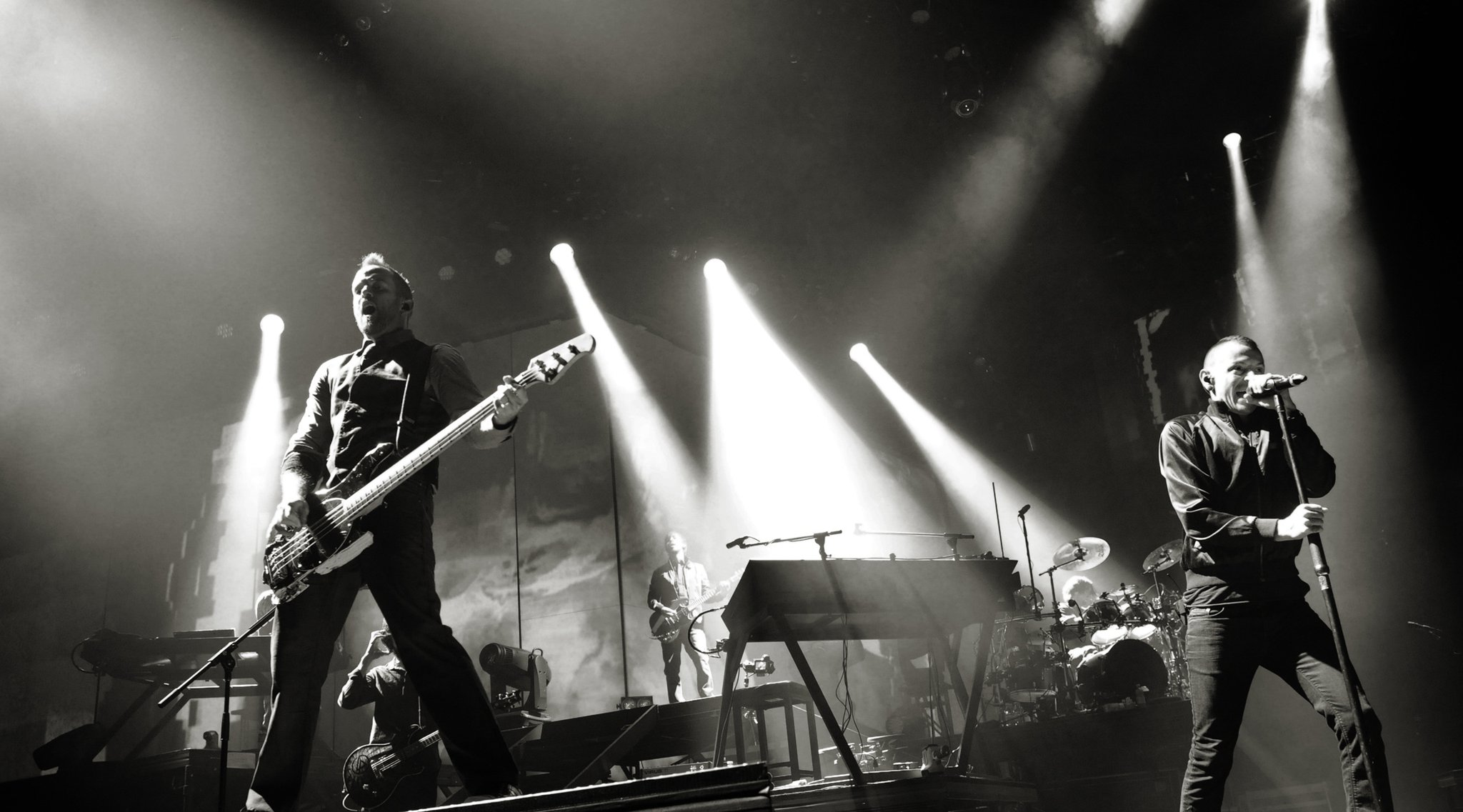
Linkin Park's A Thousand Suns spent three weeks at number one in 2010.

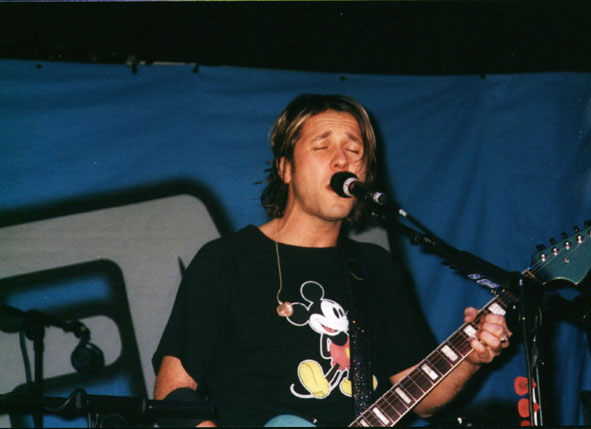
British band Feeder topped the chart for the first time in 2010 with their album Renegades.

Key
†	Indicates best-selling rock album of 2010

Issue date	Album	Artist(s)	Record label(s)	Ref.
2 January	The Resistance	Muse	Helium 3/Warner Bros.	
9 January	The Resistance	Muse	Helium 3/Warner Bros.	
16 January	The Resistance	Muse	Helium 3/Warner Bros.	
23 January	The Resistance	Muse	Helium 3/Warner Bros.	
30 January	The Resistance	Muse	Helium 3/Warner Bros.	
6 February	The Resistance	Muse	Helium 3/Warner Bros.	
13 February	The Resistance	Muse	Helium 3/Warner Bros.	
20 February	Screamworks: Love in Theory and Practice	HIM	Sire	
27 February	Greatest Hits	Foo Fighters	RCA	
6 March	The Resistance	Muse	Helium 3/Warner Bros.	
13 March	The Resistance	Muse	Helium 3/Warner Bros.	
20 March	No Guts. No Glory.	Airbourne	Roadrunner	
27 March	Greatest Hits	Foo Fighters	RCA	
3 April	Them Crooked Vultures	Them Crooked Vultures	RCA	
10 April	Greatest Hits	Foo Fighters	RCA	
17 April	Slash	Slash	Roadrunner	
24 April	Year of the Black Rainbow	Coheed and Cambria	Roadrunner	
1 May	Iron Man 2 Original Soundtrack †	AC/DC	Columbia	
8 May	Fever	Bullet for My Valentine	Sony	
15 May	Iron Man 2 Original Soundtrack †	AC/DC	Columbia	
22 May	Slash	Slash	Roadrunner	
29 May	Iron Man 2 Original Soundtrack †	AC/DC	Columbia	
5 June	Iron Man 2 Original Soundtrack †	AC/DC	Columbia	
12 June	Slash	Slash	Roadrunner	
19 June	Slash	Slash	Roadrunner	
26 June	Iron Man 2 Original Soundtrack †	AC/DC	Columbia	
3 July	Scream	Ozzy Osbourne	Epic	
10 July	The Resistance	Muse	Helium 3/Warner Bros.	
17 July	Renegades	Feeder	Big Teeth	
24 July	Korn III: Remember Who You Are	Korn	Roadrunner	
31 July	The Resistance	Muse	Helium 3/Warner Bros.	
7 August	Nightmare	Avenged Sevenfold	Warner Bros.	
14 August	Nightmare	Avenged Sevenfold	Warner Bros.	
21 August	Nightmare	Avenged Sevenfold	Warner Bros.	
28 August	The Final Frontier	Iron Maiden	EMI	
4 September	The Final Frontier	Iron Maiden	EMI	
11 September	Light Me Up	The Pretty Reckless	Interscope	
18 September	Audio Secrecy	Stone Sour	Roadrunner	
25 September	A Thousand Suns	Linkin Park	Warner Bros.	
2 October	Black Country Communion	Black Country Communion	Mascot	
9 October	A Thousand Suns	Linkin Park	Warner Bros.	
16 October	There Is a Hell Believe Me I've Seen It. There Is a Heaven Let's Keep It a Secret	Bring Me the Horizon	Visible Noise	
23 October	AB III	Alter Bridge	Roadrunner	
30 October	Mothership	Led Zeppelin	Atlantic	
6 November	Mothership	Led Zeppelin	Atlantic	
13 November	Mothership	Led Zeppelin	Atlantic	
20 November	A Thousand Suns	Linkin Park	Warner Bros.	
27 November	What Separates Me from You	A Day to Remember	Victory	
4 December	Mothership	Led Zeppelin	Atlantic	
11 December	Mothership	Led Zeppelin	Atlantic	
18 December	Mothership	Led Zeppelin	Atlantic	
25 December	Greatest Hits	Foo Fighters	RCA	

== See also ==
- 2010 in British music
- List of UK Rock & Metal Singles Chart number ones of 2010
