= List of UK Rock & Metal Albums Chart number ones of 1994 =

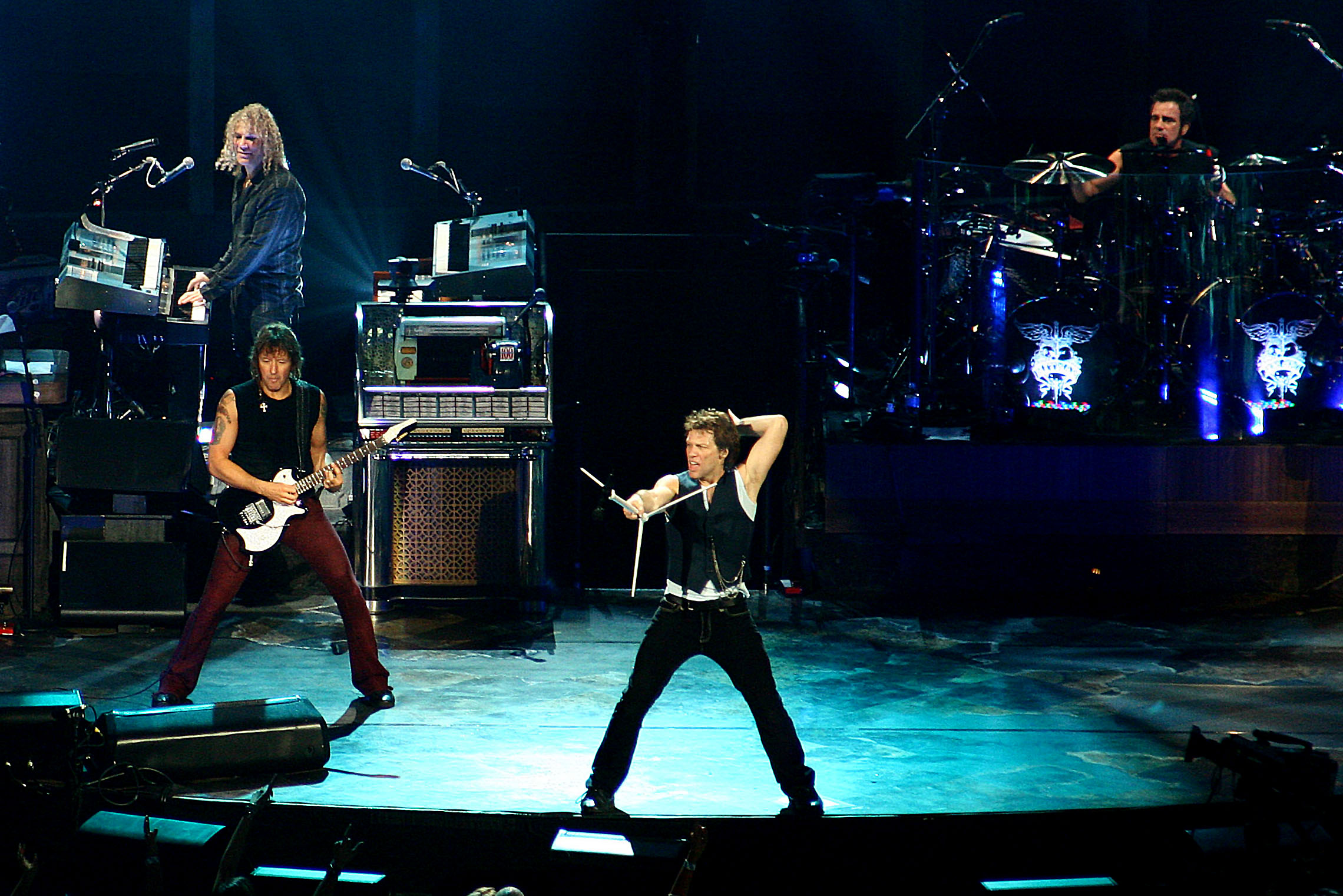
Cross Road by Bon Jovi was the longest-running number-one rock album of 1994, spending eight weeks atop the chart. It ended 1994 as the second best-selling album of the year in the UK.

The UK Rock & Metal Albums Chart is a record chart which ranks the best-selling rock and heavy metal albums in the United Kingdom. In 1994, the chart was compiled by Gallup and published in Hit Music magazine every two weeks. During the year, 25 charts were published with 19 albums at number one. The first number-one album of the year was So Far So Good by Bryan Adams, which spent the first two charts of 1994 at number one. The last number-one album of the year was Second Coming by the Stone Roses. Cross Road by Bon Jovi was the most successful album of the year on the chart, spending a total of eight weeks at number one, and finished the year as the second best-selling album in the UK.

== Chart history ==
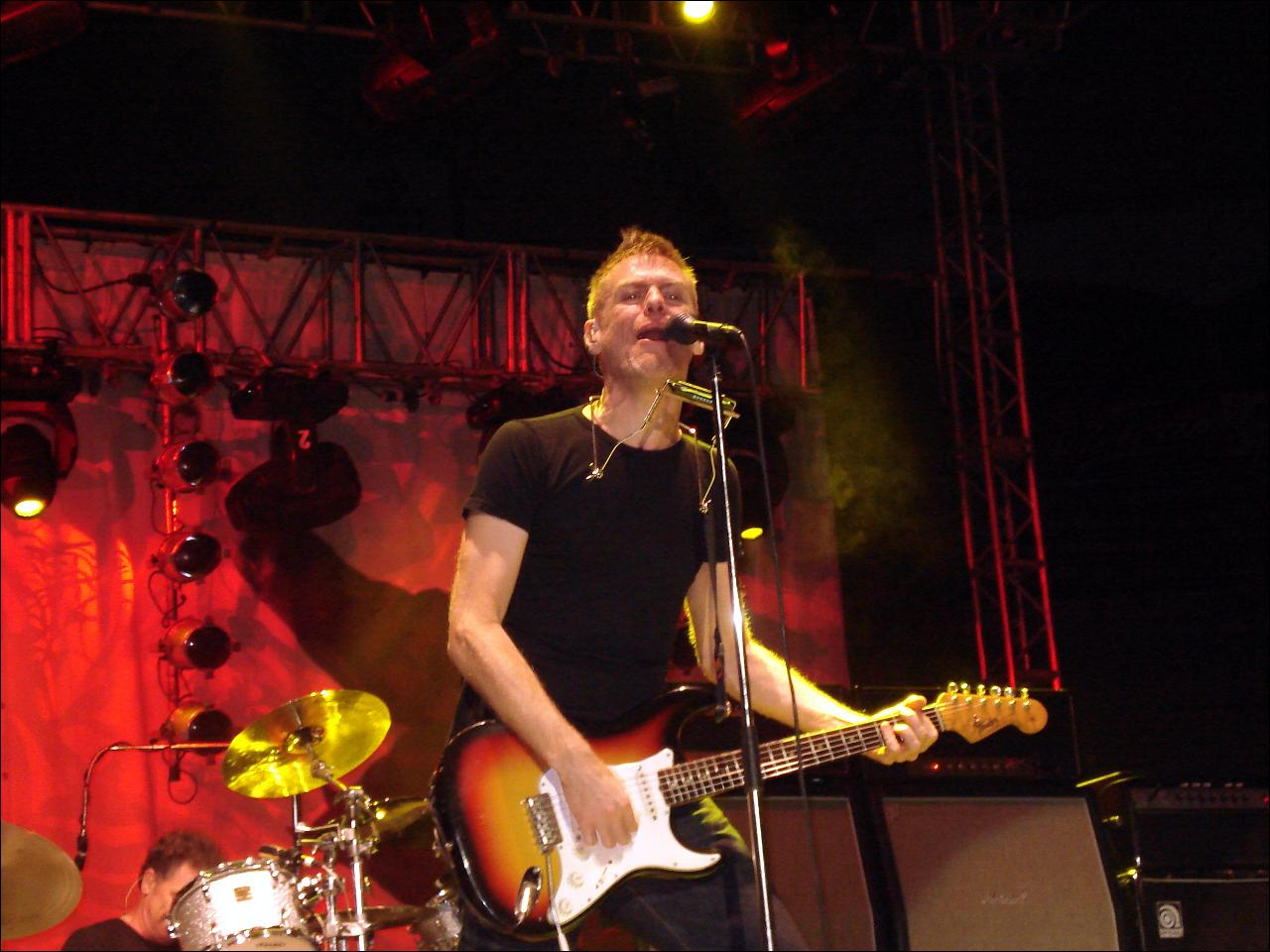
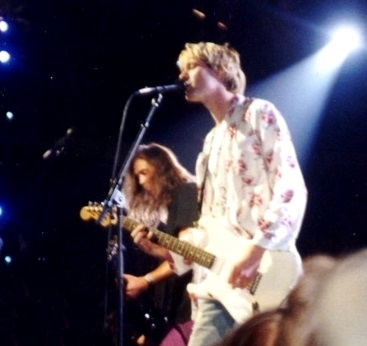
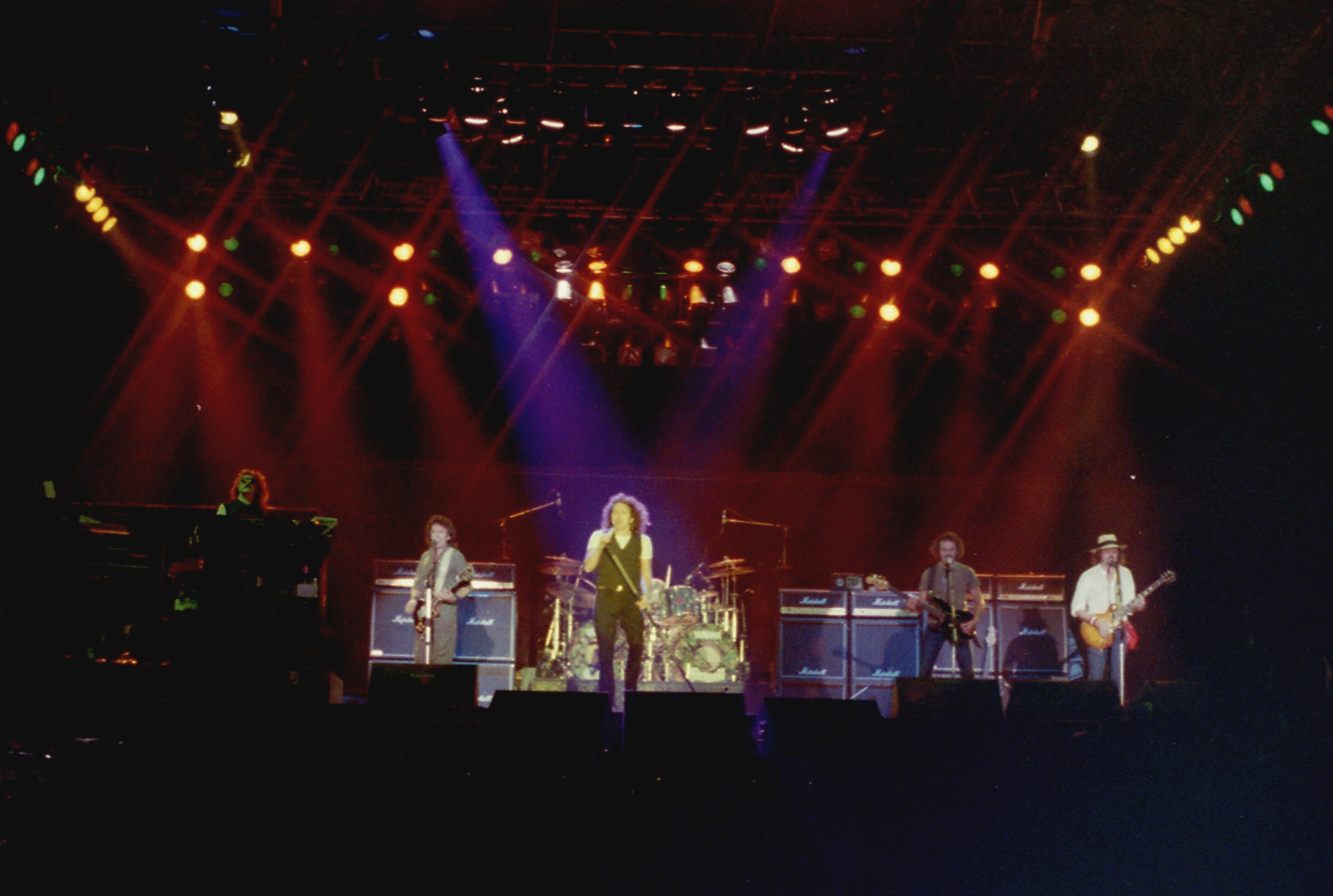
So Far So Good by Bryan Adams (top), Nevermind by Nirvana (middle) and Greatest Hits by Whitesnake (bottom) all spent four weeks at number one in 1994.

Key
†	Indicates best-selling rock album of 1994

Issue date	Album	Artist(s)	Record label(s)	Ref.
15 January	So Far So Good	Bryan Adams	A&M	
29 January	So Far So Good	Bryan Adams	A&M	
12 February	Jar of Flies/Sap	Alice in Chains	Columbia	
26 February	Bat Out of Hell II: Back into Hell	Meat Loaf	Virgin	
12 March	Troublegum	Therapy?	A&M	
26 March	Superunknown	Soundgarden	A&M	
9 April	Far Beyond Driven	Pantera	East West	
23 April	A Little of the Past	Little Angels	Polydor	
7 May	Don't Be Happy... Just Worry	The Wildhearts	East West	
21 May	Nevermind	Nirvana	Geffen	
4 June	Nevermind	Nirvana	Geffen	
18 June	The Last Temptation	Alice Cooper	Epic	
2 July	Betty	Helmet	Interscope	
2 July	Greatest Hits	Whitesnake	EMI	
30 July	Greatest Hits	Whitesnake	EMI	
13 August	Swagger	Gun	A&M	
27 August	Burn My Eyes	Machine Head	Roadrunner	
10 September	The Holy Bible	Manic Street Preachers	Epic	
24 September	Born Dead	Body Count	Rhyme Syndicate	
8 October	Crank	The Almighty	Chrysalis	
22 October	Cross Road †	Bon Jovi	Jambco	
5 November	Cross Road †	Bon Jovi	Jambco	
19 November	Cross Road †	Bon Jovi	Jambco	
3 December	Cross Road †	Bon Jovi	Jambco	
17 December	Second Coming	The Stone Roses	Geffen	

== See also ==
- 1994 in British music
- List of UK Rock & Metal Singles Chart number ones of 1994
