= List of UK Rock & Metal Singles Chart number ones of 2010 =

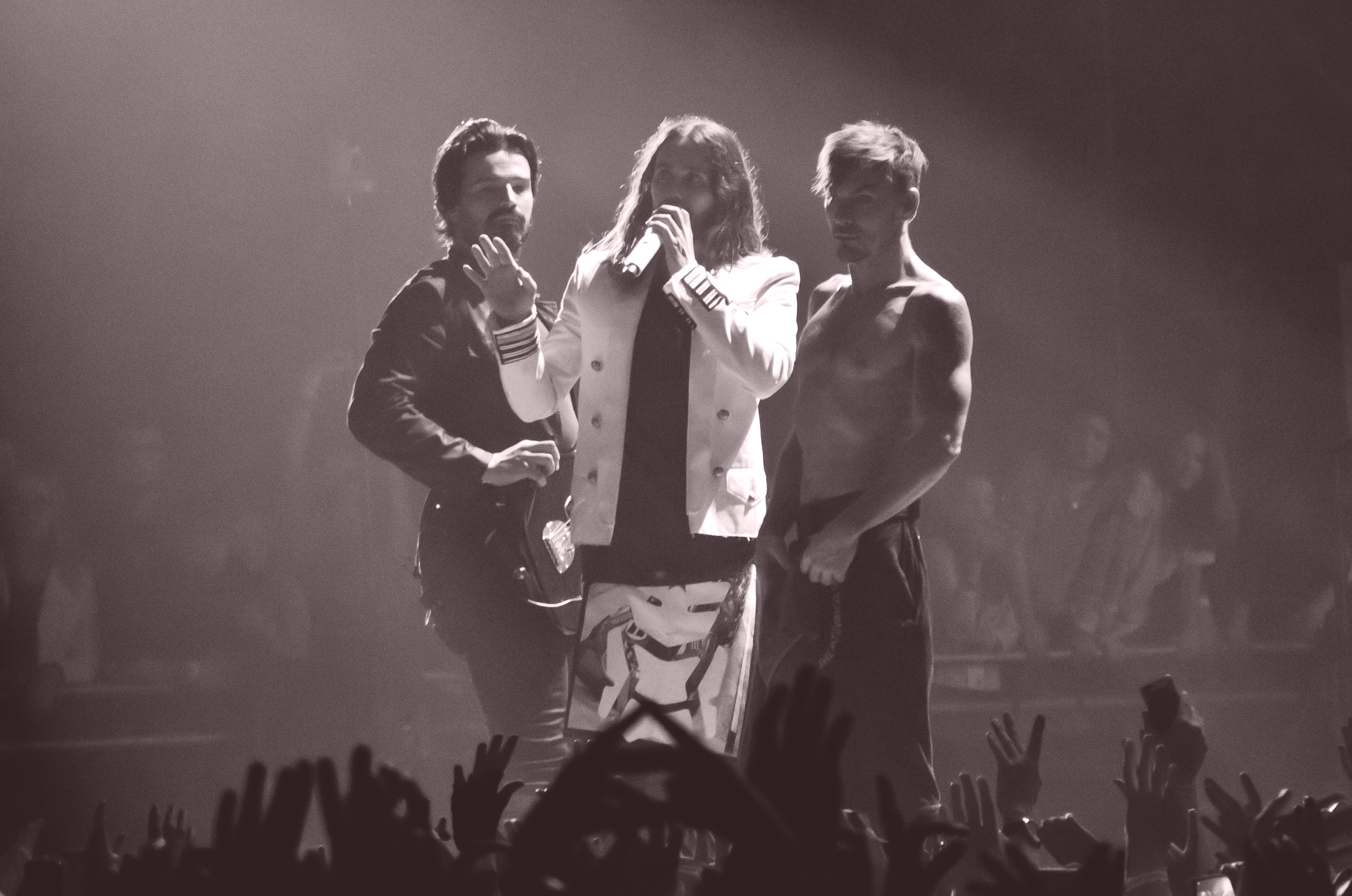
"Closer to the Edge" by Thirty Seconds to Mars was the longest-running number-one single of 2010, spending eight weeks atop the chart during the year.

The UK Rock & Metal Singles Chart is a record chart which ranks the best-selling rock and heavy metal songs in the United Kingdom. Compiled and published by the Official Charts Company, the data is based on each track's weekly physical sales, digital downloads and streams. In 2010, there were 17 singles that topped the 52 published charts. The first number-one single of the year was "Killing in the Name" by American rap metal band Rage Against the Machine, which topped the chart during the final week of 2009 and remained at number one for the first two weeks of 2010. The final number-one of the year was "Ace of Spades" by Motörhead.

The most successful song on the UK Rock & Metal Singles Chart in 2010 was "Closer to the Edge" by Thirty Seconds to Mars, which spent eight consecutive weeks at number one between 17 July and 4 September. "Make Me Wanna Die" by The Pretty Reckless spent seven consecutive weeks at number one prior to this, while Paramore's "The Only Exception" was number one for six straight weeks earlier in the year. Muse spent five weeks at number one with two songs – "Resistance" for three weeks and "Feeling Good" for two. "Na Na Na (Na Na Na Na Na Na Na Na Na)" by My Chemical Romance spent four weeks atop the chart, while singles by Goo Goo Dolls, Muse, Guns N' Roses and Linkin Park each spent three weeks at number one.

== Chart history ==
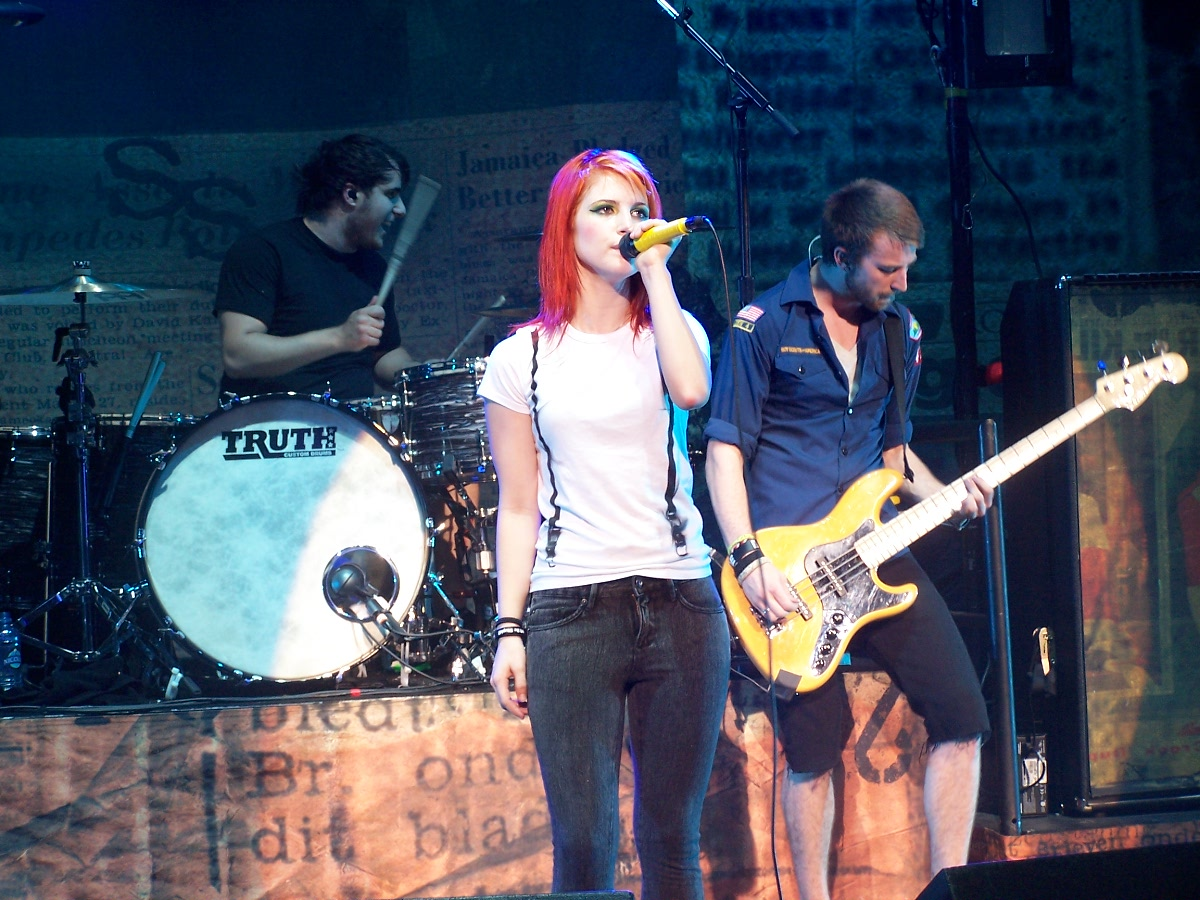
"The Only Exception" by Paramore was number one on the chart for six consecutive weeks in 2010.

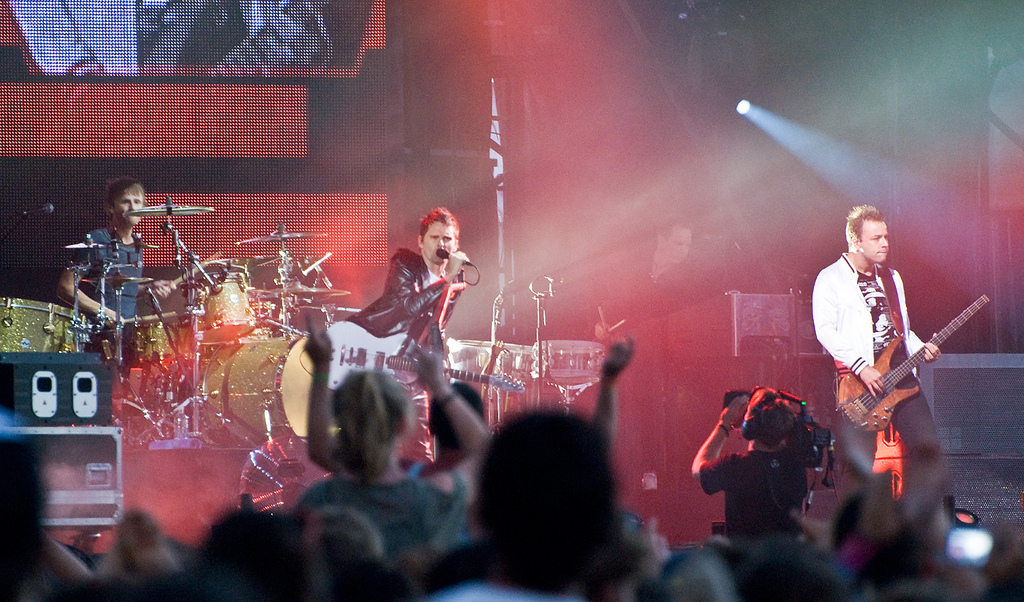
Muse spent five weeks at number one with "Resistance" (three weeks) and "Feeling Good" (two weeks).

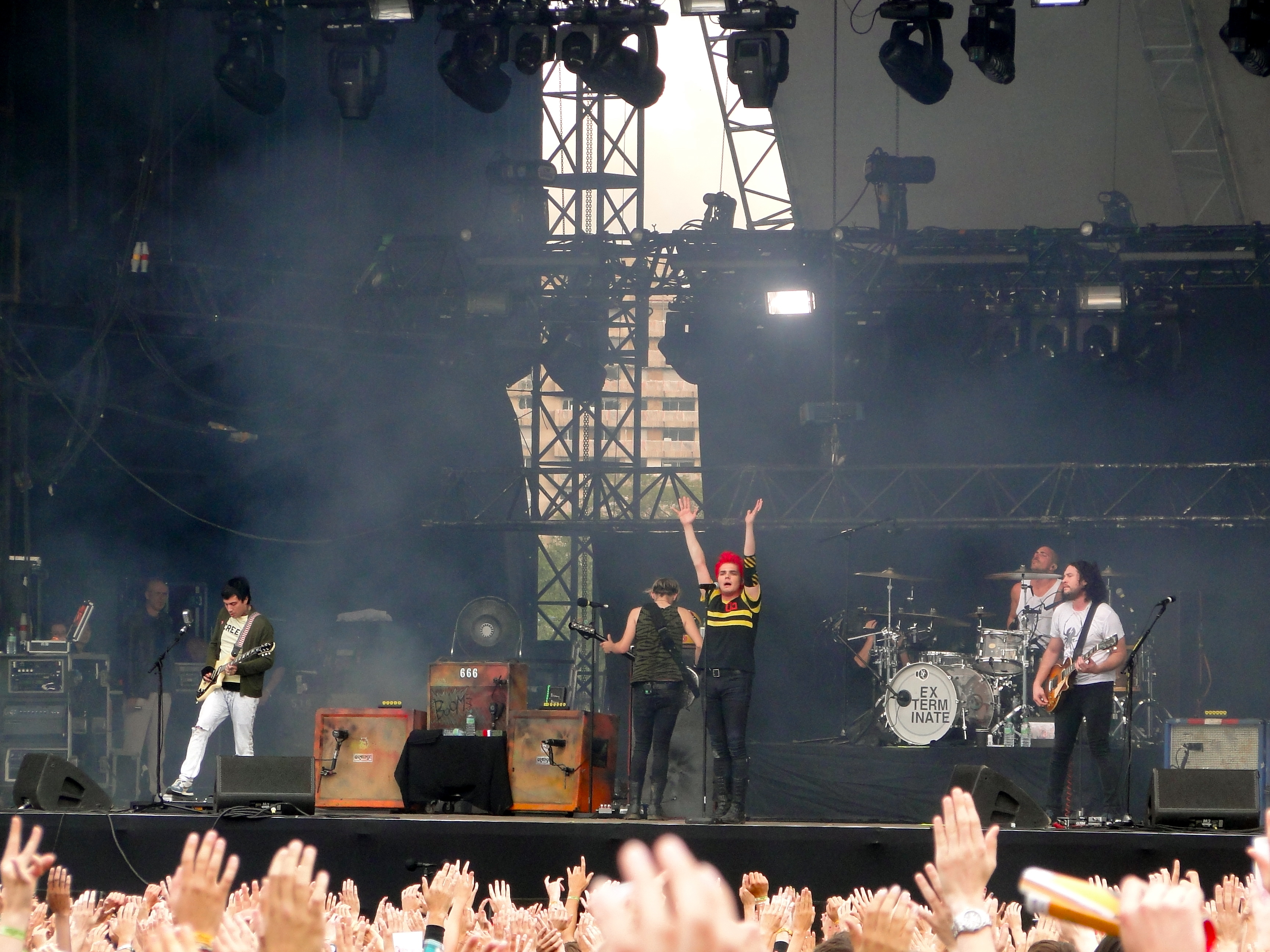
"Na Na Na (Na Na Na Na Na Na Na Na Na)" by My Chemical Romance spent four weeks at number one in 2010.

Issue date	Single	Artist(s)	Record label(s)	Ref.
2 January	"Killing in the Name"	Rage Against the Machine	Epic	
9 January	"Killing in the Name"	Rage Against the Machine	Epic	
16 January	"Where We Belong"	Lostprophets	Visible Noise	
23 January	"Where We Belong"	Lostprophets	Visible Noise	
30 January	"Where We Belong"	Lostprophets	Visible Noise	
6 February	"Where We Belong"	Lostprophets	Visible Noise	
13 February	"Where We Belong"	Lostprophets	Visible Noise	
20 February	"Iris"	Goo Goo Dolls	Warner Bros.	
27 February	"Iris"	Goo Goo Dolls	Warner Bros.	
6 March	"Resistance"	Muse	Warner Bros.	
13 March	"Resistance"	Muse	Warner Bros.	
20 March	"Resistance"	Muse	Warner Bros.	
27 March	"Iris"	Goo Goo Dolls	Warner Bros.	
3 April	"Matters at All"	Kids in Glass Houses	Roadrunner	
10 April	"The Only Exception"	Paramore	Atlantic	
17 April	"The Only Exception"	Paramore	Atlantic	
24 April	"The Only Exception"	Paramore	Atlantic	
1 May	"The Only Exception"	Paramore	Atlantic	
8 May	"The Only Exception"	Paramore	Atlantic	
15 May	"The Only Exception"	Paramore	Atlantic	
22 May	"Sweet Child o' Mine"	Guns N' Roses	Geffen	
29 May	"Make Me Wanna Die"	The Pretty Reckless	Interscope	
5 June	"Make Me Wanna Die"	The Pretty Reckless	Interscope	
12 June	"Make Me Wanna Die"	The Pretty Reckless	Interscope	
19 June	"Make Me Wanna Die"	The Pretty Reckless	Interscope	
26 June	"Make Me Wanna Die"	The Pretty Reckless	Interscope	
3 July	"Make Me Wanna Die"	The Pretty Reckless	Interscope	
10 July	"Make Me Wanna Die"	The Pretty Reckless	Interscope	
17 July	"Closer to the Edge"	Thirty Seconds to Mars	Virgin	
24 July	"Closer to the Edge"	Thirty Seconds to Mars	Virgin	
31 July	"Closer to the Edge"	Thirty Seconds to Mars	Virgin	
7 August	"Closer to the Edge"	Thirty Seconds to Mars	Virgin	
14 August	"Closer to the Edge"	Thirty Seconds to Mars	Virgin	
21 August	"Closer to the Edge"	Thirty Seconds to Mars	Virgin	
28 August	"Closer to the Edge"	Thirty Seconds to Mars	Virgin	
4 September	"Closer to the Edge"	Thirty Seconds to Mars	Virgin	
11 September	"Change Your Name"	Ash	Atomic Heart	
18 September	"The Catalyst"	Linkin Park	Warner Bros.	
25 September	"The Catalyst"	Linkin Park	Warner Bros.	
2 October	"The Catalyst"	Linkin Park	Warner Bros.	
9 October	"Sweet Child o' Mine"	Guns N' Roses	Geffen	
16 October	"Sweet Child o' Mine"	Guns N' Roses	Geffen	
23 October	"Feeling Good"	Muse	A&E	
30 October	"Feeling Good"	Muse	A&E	
6 November	"Destabilise"	Enter Shikari	Ambush Reality	
13 November	"Livin' on a Prayer"	Bon Jovi	Mercury	
20 November	"Na Na Na (Na Na Na Na Na Na Na Na Na)"	My Chemical Romance	Reprise	
27 November	"Na Na Na (Na Na Na Na Na Na Na Na Na)"	My Chemical Romance	Reprise	
4 December	"Na Na Na (Na Na Na Na Na Na Na Na Na)"	My Chemical Romance	Reprise	
11 December	"Na Na Na (Na Na Na Na Na Na Na Na Na)"	My Chemical Romance	Reprise	
18 December	"Christmas Time (Don't Let the Bells End)"	The Darkness	Must Destroy	
25 December	"Ace of Spades"	Motörhead	Castle	

== See also ==
- 2010 in British music
- List of UK Rock & Metal Albums Chart number ones of 2010
