= List of UK Rock & Metal Singles Chart number ones of 1987 =

These are the UK Rock & Metal Singles Chart number one hits of 1987. The chart was compiled by MRIB who were a direct rival competitor to Gallup who compiled the "official" charts that were later produced by the Chart Information Network, before being renamed the Official Charts Company. However, the Official Charts Company did not start producing the UK Rock & Metal charts until 1994.

Week ending	Song	Artist	Duration
3 January	"The Final Countdown"	Europe	4 weeks
31 January	"Over the Hills and Far Away"	Gary Moore	2 weeks
14 February	"Rock the Night"	Europe	4 weeks
14 March	"I Am the Law"	Anthrax	2 weeks
28 March	"Tonight, Tonight, Tonight"	Genesis	1 week
4 April	"Still of the Night"	Whitesnake	1 week
11 April	"Wanted Dead or Alive"	Bon Jovi	4 weeks
9 May	"Lil' Devil"	The Cult	2 weeks
23 May	"Incommunicado"	Marillion	3 weeks
13 June	"Is This Love"	Whitesnake	5 weeks
18 July	"Alone"	Heart	2 weeks
1 August	"Animal"	Def Leppard	4 weeks
29 August	"The $5.98 E.P. - Garage Days Re-Revisited"	Metallica	2 weeks
12 September	"Scream Until You Like It"	W.A.S.P.	2 weeks
26 September	"Pour Some Sugar On Me"	Def Leppard	1 week
3 October	"Crazy Crazy Nights"	Kiss	5 weeks
7 November	"Here I Go Again"	Whitesnake	4 weeks
5 December	"Hysteria"	Def Leppard	1 week
12 December	"I'm the Man"	Anthrax	3 weeks

== See also ==
- List of UK Dance Singles Chart number ones of 1987
- List of UK Independent Singles Chart number ones of the 1980s
