= List of UK Rock & Metal Singles Chart number ones of 1988 =

These are the UK Rock & Metal Singles Chart number one hits of 1988. The chart was compiled by MRIB who were a direct rival competitor to Gallup who compiled the "official" charts that were later produced by the Chart Information Network, before being renamed the Official Charts Company. However, the Official Charts Company did not start producing the UK Rock & Metal charts until 1994.

Week ending	Song	Artist	Duration
2 January	"Reason to Live"	Kiss	2 Weeks
16 January	"I Found Someone"	Cher	1 week
23 January	"Heatseeker"	AC/DC	3 weeks
13 February	"Give Me All Your Love"	Whitesnake	4 weeks
5 March	"Anarchy in the U.K."	Megadeth	1 week
12 March	"Just Like Paradise"	David Lee Roth	1 week
19 March	"Never"/"These Dreams"	Heart	3 weeks
9 April	"Can I Play with Madness"	Iron Maiden	4 weeks
7 May	"Armageddon It"	Def Leppard	2 weeks
21 May	"Start Talking Love"	Magnum	2 Weeks
4 June	"What About Love"	Heart	5 weeks
9 July	"One Slip"	Pink Floyd	1 week
16 July	"It Must Have Been Love"	Magnum	2 Weeks
30 July	"Love Bites"	Def Leppard	4 weeks
27 August	"The Evil That Men Do"	Iron Maiden	2 weeks
10 September	"Harvester of Sorrow"	Metallica	1 week
17 September	"Make Me Laugh"	Anthrax	2 Weeks
1 October	"Bad Medicine"	Bon Jovi	4 weeks
29 October	"Don't Walk Away"	Pat Benatar	1 Week
5 November	"Welcome to the Jungle"	Guns N' Roses	3 Weeks
26 November	"The Clairvoyant"	Iron Maiden	2 Weeks
10 December	"Suddenly"	Angry Anderson	4 Weeks
