= List of UK Rock & Metal Singles Chart number ones of 1986 =

These are the UK Rock & Metal Singles Chart number one hits of 1986. The chart was compiled by MRIB who were a direct rival competitor to Gallup who compiled the "official" charts that were later produced by the Chart Information Network, before being renamed the Official Charts Company. However, the Official Charts Company did not start producing the UK Rock & Metal charts until 1994.

Week ending	Song	Artist	Duration
4 January	"Run to the Hills (Live)"	Iron Maiden	2 Weeks
18 January	"Spirit of 76"	The Alarm	2 Weeks
1 February	"Shot in the Dark"	Ozzy Osbourne	2 Weeks
8 February	"Burning Heart"	Survivor	7 Weeks
5 April	"Why Can't This Be Love"	Van Halen	2 weeks
19 April	"Stars"	Hear 'n Aid	3 weeks
10 May	"Why Can't This Be Love"	Van Halen	2 weeks
24 May	"Who Made Who"	AC/DC	1 Week
31 May	"Why Can't This Be Love"	Van Halen	5 Weeks
5 July	"Deaf Forever"	Motörhead	1 Week
12 July	"Dreams"	Van Halen	2 Weeks
26 July	"Garden of Delight"	The Mission	2 Weeks
9 August	"You Give Love A Bad Name"	Bon Jovi	4 Weeks
6 September	"Wasted Years"	Iron Maiden	1 Week
13 September	"You Give Love a Bad Name"	Bon Jovi	3 Weeks
4 October	"In the Army Now"	Status Quo	7 Weeks
22 November	"Livin' on a Prayer"	Bon Jovi	1 Week
29 November	"The Final Countdown"	Europe	5 Weeks

== See also ==
- List of UK Independent Singles Chart number ones of the 1980s
