= List of UK Rock & Metal Singles Chart number ones of 1993 =

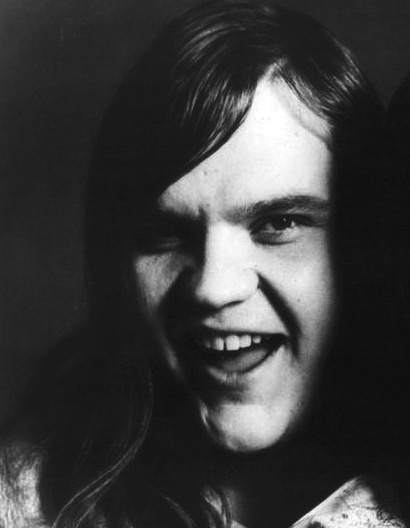
"I'd Do Anything for Love (But I Won't Do That)" by Meat Loaf was the longest-running number-one single of 1993, spending ten weeks atop the Rock & Metal Singles Chart. It ended 1993 as the overall best-selling single of the year in the UK.

The UK Rock & Metal Singles Chart is a record chart which ranks the best-selling rock and heavy metal singles in the United Kingdom. In 1993, the chart was compiled by Gallup and published in Hit Music magazine every two weeks. During the year, 26 charts were published with 17 singles at number one. The first number-one single of the year was "Womankind" by Little Angels. The last number-one single of the year was "I'd Do Anything for Love (But I Won't Do That)" by Meat Loaf, which spent the last ten weeks of the year atop the chart. "I'd Do Anything for Love (But I Won't Do That)" was also the most successful single of the year on the chart, as well as the overall best-selling single of the year in the UK.

== Chart history ==
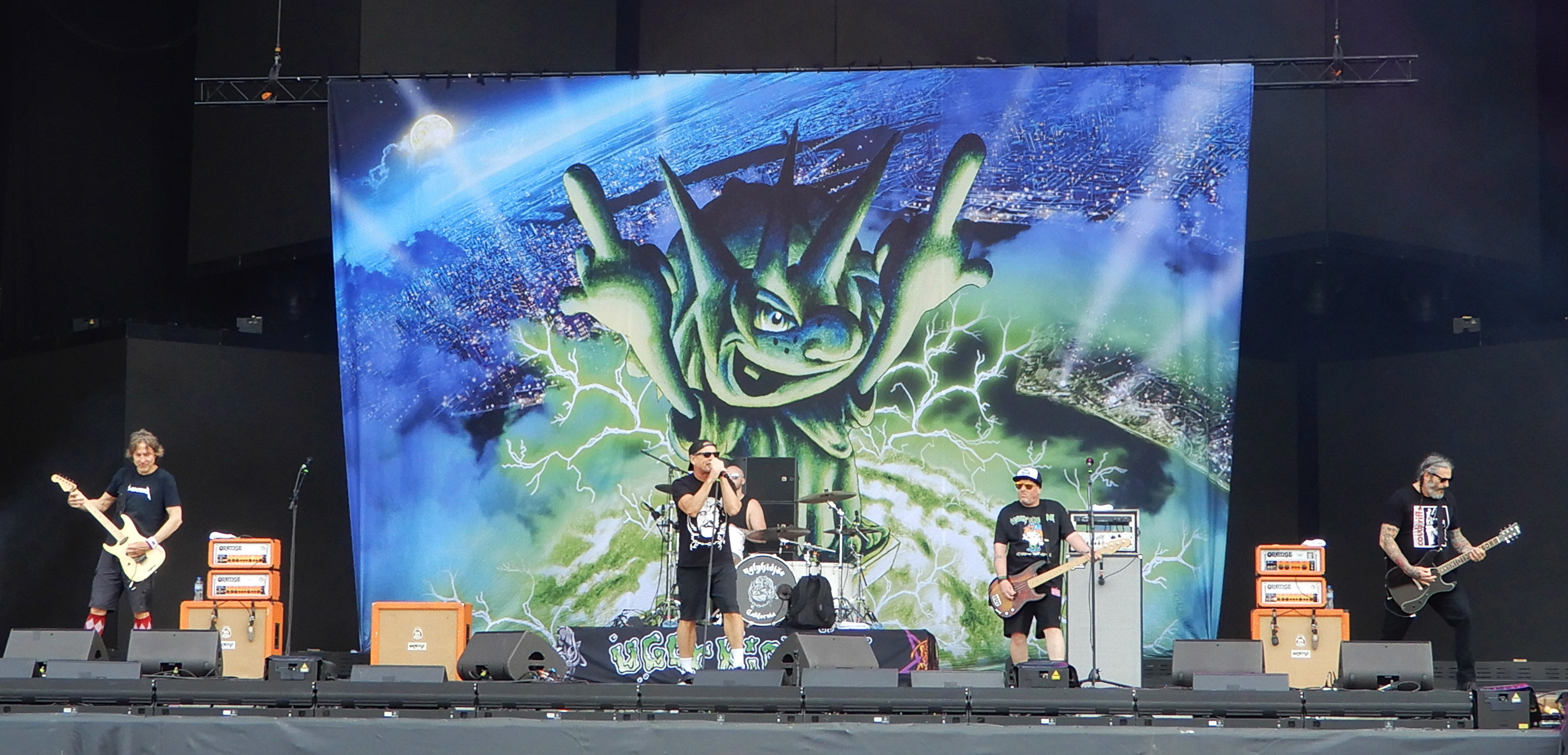
Ugly Kid Joe's version of "Cats in the Cradle" spent six weeks at number one during April and May 1993.

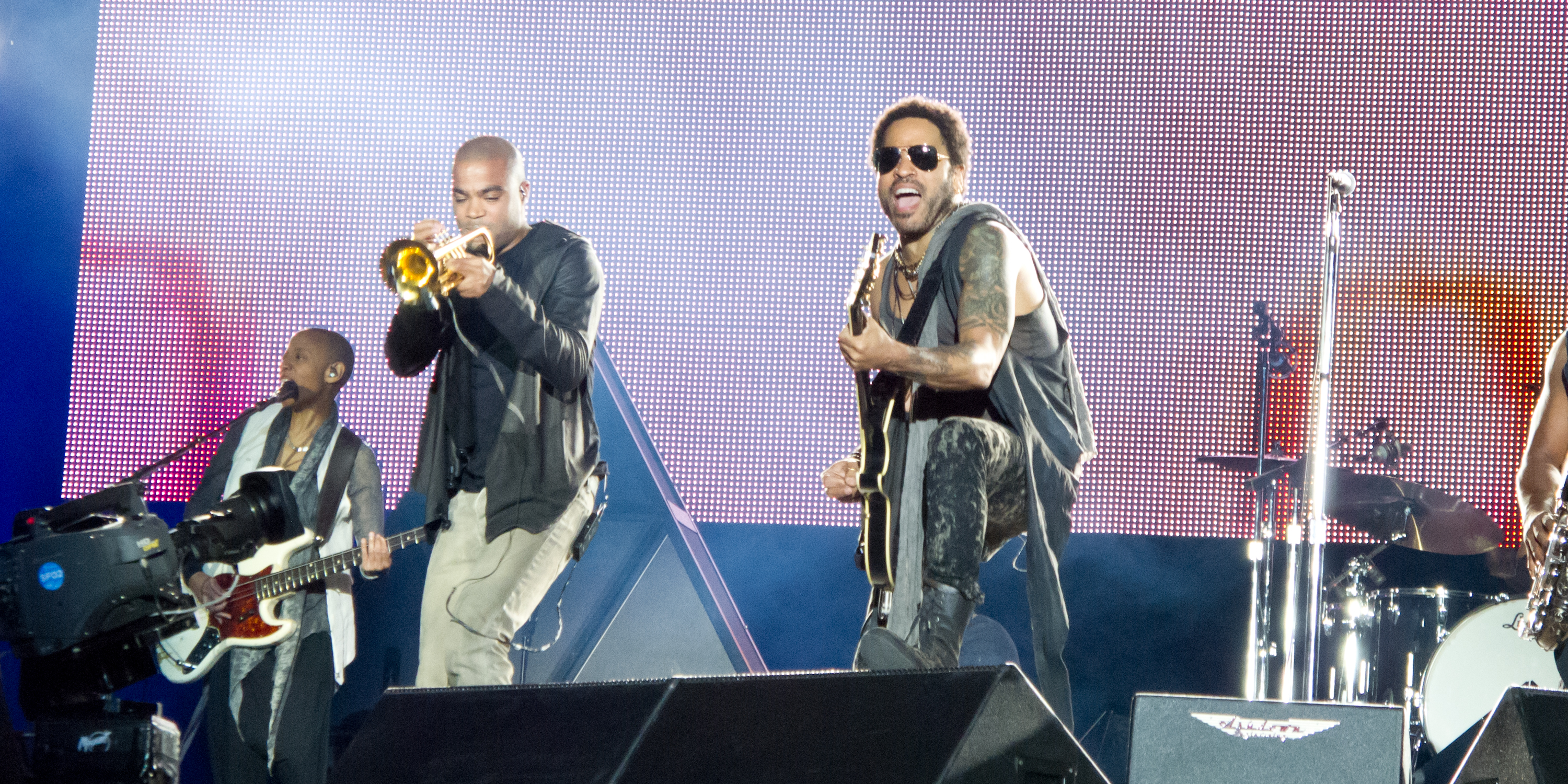
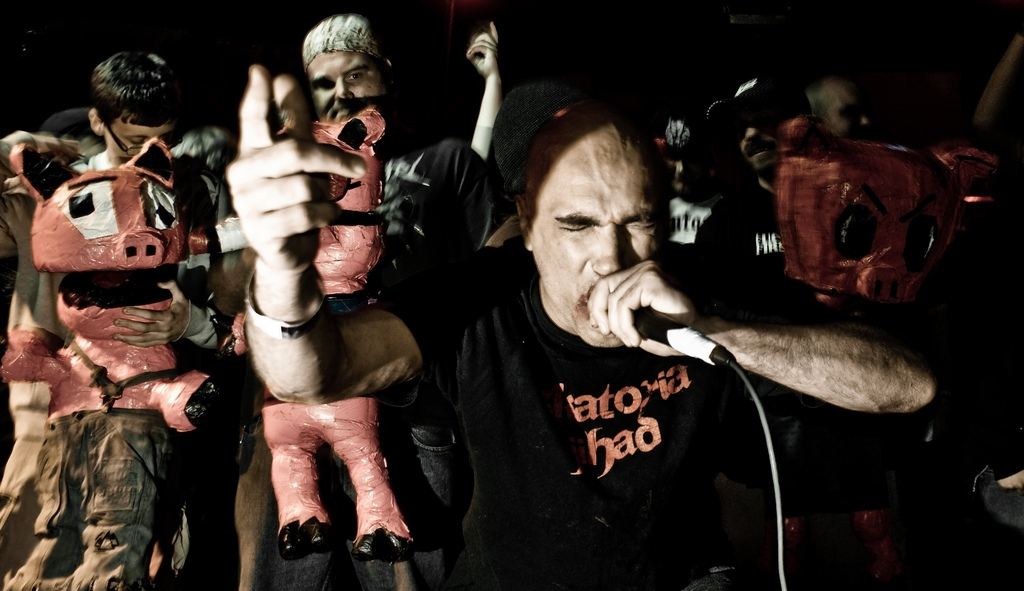
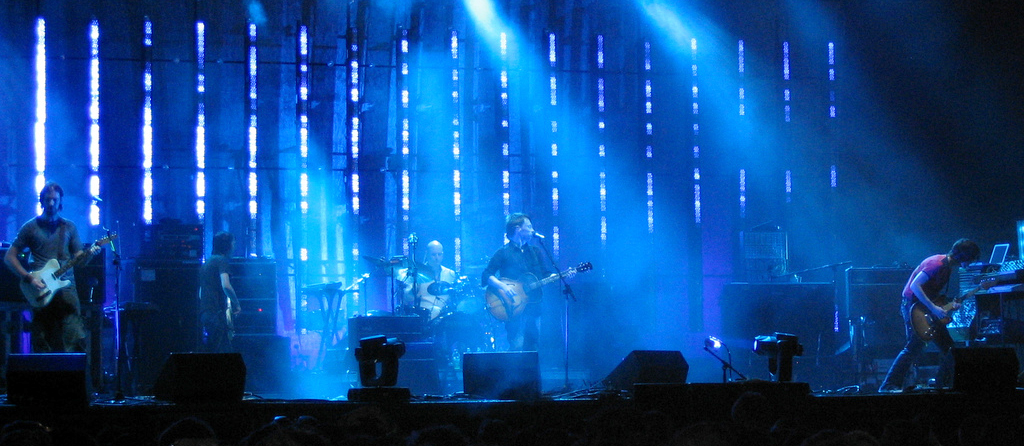
Lenny Kravitz (top), Green Jellÿ (middle) and Radiohead (bottom) each topped two UK Rock & Metal Singles Charts in 1993.

Key
†	Indicates best-selling rock single of 1993

Issue date	Single	Artist(s)	Record label(s)	Ref.
9 January	"Womankind"	Little Angels	Polydor	
23 January	"I'm Easy/Be Aggressive"	Faith No More	Slash	
6 February	"Heaven Is"	Def Leppard	Bludgeon Riffola	
20 February	"A Better Man"	Thunder	EMI	
6 March	"Are You Gonna Go My Way"	Lenny Kravitz	Virgin	
20 March	"Are You Gonna Go My Way"	Lenny Kravitz	Virgin	
3 April	"Cats in the Cradle"	Ugly Kid Joe	Mercury	
10 April	"Cats in the Cradle"	Ugly Kid Joe	Mercury	
24 April	"Cats in the Cradle"	Ugly Kid Joe	Mercury	
8 May	"Bullet in the Head"	Rage Against the Machine	Epic	
22 May	"In These Arms"	Bon Jovi	Jambco	
5 June	"Three Little Pigs"	Green Jellÿ	Zoo	
19 June	"Three Little Pigs"	Green Jellÿ	Zoo	
3 July	"Take Me for a Little While"	Coverdale–Page	EMI	
17 July	"Big Gun"	AC/DC	Atco	
31 July	"La Tristesse Durera (Scream to a Sigh)"	Manic Street Preachers	Columbia	
14 August	"I'll Sleep When I'm Dead"	Bon Jovi	Jambco	
28 August	"Opal Mantra"	Therapy?	A&M	
11 September	"Heart-Shaped Box"	Nirvana	Geffen	
25 September	"Creep"	Radiohead	Parlophone	
9 October	"Creep"	Radiohead	Parlophone	
23 October	"I'd Do Anything for Love (But I Won't Do That)" †	Meat Loaf	Virgin	
6 November	"I'd Do Anything for Love (But I Won't Do That)" †	Meat Loaf	Virgin	
20 November	"I'd Do Anything for Love (But I Won't Do That)" †	Meat Loaf	Virgin	
4 December	"I'd Do Anything for Love (But I Won't Do That)" †	Meat Loaf	Virgin	
18 December	"I'd Do Anything for Love (But I Won't Do That)" †	Meat Loaf	Virgin	

== See also ==
- 1993 in British music
- List of UK Rock & Metal Albums Chart number ones of 1993
