= List of UK Rock & Metal Albums Chart number ones of 1993 =

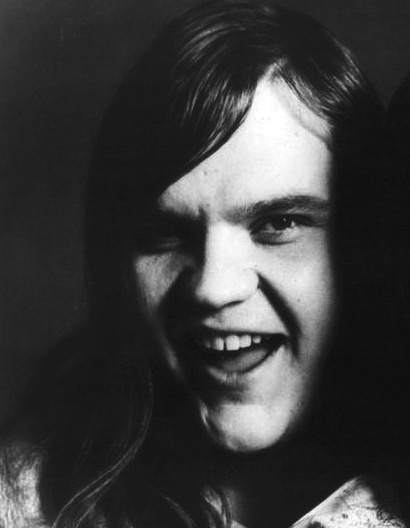
Meat Loaf's Bat Out of Hell II: Back into Hell was the longest-running number-one album of 1993, spending 13 weeks atop the Rock & Metal Albums Chart. It ended 1993 as the overall best-selling album of the year in the UK.

The UK Rock & Metal Albums Chart is a record chart which ranks the best-selling rock and heavy metal albums in the United Kingdom. In 1993, the chart was compiled by Gallup and published in Hit Music magazine every two weeks. During the year, 25 charts were published with 13 albums at number one. The first number-one album of the year was Incesticide by Nirvana, which topped the first two charts of the year. The last number-one album of the year was Bat Out of Hell II: Back into Hell by Meat Loaf. Bat Out of Hell II was also the most successful album of the year on the chart, spending a total of 13 weeks at number one, as well as the overall best-selling album of the year in the UK.

== Chart history ==
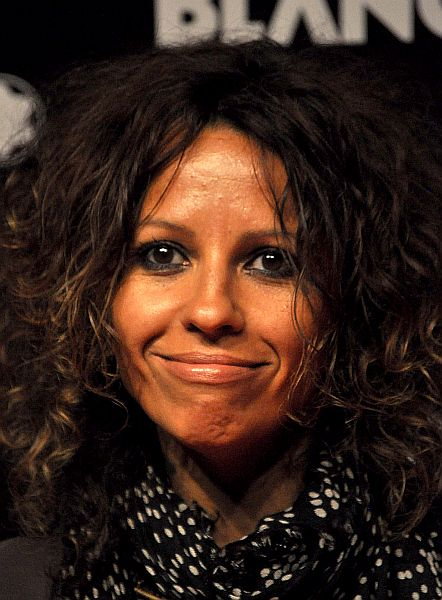
4 Non Blondes spent six consecutive weeks at number one over the summer of 1993 with their only studio album, Bigger, Better, Faster, More! Lead singer Linda Perry is shown pictured above.

Key
| † | Indicates best-selling rock album of 1993 |

| Issue date | Album | Artist(s) | Record label(s) | Ref. |
|---|---|---|---|---|
| 16 January | Incesticide | Nirvana | Geffen | |
| 30 January | Incesticide | Nirvana | Geffen | |
| 13 February | Jam | Little Angels | Polydor | |
| 27 February | Pure Cult: for Rockers, Ravers, Lovers, and Sinners | The Cult | Beggars Banquet | |
| 13 March | Are You Gonna Go My Way | Lenny Kravitz | Virgin | |
| 27 March | Are You Gonna Go My Way | Lenny Kravitz | Virgin | |
| 17 April | Powertrippin' | The Almighty | Polydor | |
| 1 May | Get a Grip | Aerosmith | Geffen | |
| 15 May | Get a Grip | Aerosmith | Geffen | |
| 29 May | Sound of White Noise | Anthrax | Elektra | |
| 12 June | Fate of Nations | Robert Plant | Es Paranza | |
| 26 June | Keep the Faith | Bon Jovi | Jambco | |
| 10 July | Gold Against the Soul | Manic Street Preachers | Columbia | |
| 24 July | Bigger, Better, Faster, More! | 4 Non Blondes | Interscope | |
| 7 August | Bigger, Better, Faster, More! | 4 Non Blondes | Interscope | |
| 21 August | Bigger, Better, Faster, More! | 4 Non Blondes | Interscope | |
| 4 September | Keep the Faith | Bon Jovi | Jambco | |
| 18 September | Bat Out of Hell II: Back into Hell † | Meat Loaf | Virgin | |
| 2 October | Bat Out of Hell II: Back into Hell † | Meat Loaf | Virgin | |
| 16 October | Bat Out of Hell II: Back into Hell † | Meat Loaf | Virgin | |
| 30 October | Bat Out of Hell II: Back into Hell † | Meat Loaf | Virgin | |
| 13 November | Bat Out of Hell II: Back into Hell † | Meat Loaf | Virgin | |
| 27 November | Bat Out of Hell II: Back into Hell † | Meat Loaf | Virgin | |
| 11 December | "The Spaghetti Incident?" | Guns N' Roses | Geffen | |
| 25 December | Bat Out of Hell II: Back into Hell † | Meat Loaf | Virgin | |

== See also ==
- 1993 in British music
- List of UK Rock & Metal Singles Chart number ones of 1993
