= 2009 in British music =

This is a summary of 2009 in music in the United Kingdom.

== Events ==
- 4 February – The Official Charts Company launches the Specialist Classical Albums Chart, developed in consultation with the British Phonographic Industry (BPI).
- 8 February – At the 51st Grammy Awards, Coldplay win three awards including Song of the Year for Viva La Vida and Adele wins two awards including Best New Artist.
- 2 March – Elton John announces his latest tour with Billy Joel. The duo's previous tour, in 2003, grossed US$45.8 million from only 24 sellouts according to Billboard Boxscore.
- 4 April – Ringo Starr and Paul McCartney perform together (for the first time since 2002) at the Radio City Music Hall for the David Lynch Foundation.
- 11 April – Susan Boyle's version of the song "I Dreamed a Dream" from the musical Les Misérables on Britain's Got Talent becomes a worldwide sensation, as it is seen over 200 million times on YouTube and other video outlets.
- 16 May – Alexander Rybak wins the Eurovision Song Contest 2009 in Moscow, for Norway. Within a couple of days, his song, "Fairytale", reaches the top ten in charts in most of Europe, including a No. 10 entry in the UK Singles Chart. Jade Ewen finishes fifth for the UK with "It's My Time".
- 17 July, 18 & 21 – Paul McCartney performs three sold-out concerts at Citi Field to open the stadium with The Script. On 15 August 1965, The Beatles had performed the first concert at Shea Stadium and McCartney joined Billy Joel on stage for the last concert there. Joel joined McCartney again on the first night.
- 21 August – The Verve break up for the third, and final time. The split is due to Simon Jones and Nick McCabe no longer on speaking terms with Richard Ashcroft, and their assertion that Ashcroft only reformed the band as a vehicle to relaunch his solo career.
- 22 August – Oasis perform what would turn out to be their final gig, at V Festival, Staffordshire. They were supposed to perform the following night there, but cancelled due to reports that Liam Gallagher had laryngitis.
- 28 August
  - After another fight with his brother Liam, Noel Gallagher leaves Oasis. Initial reports shortly afterwards suggested that Oasis had broken up, but Liam denied this. The remaining members of Oasis eventually decide to discontinue the band name and start recording under a new name, Beady Eye.
  - Greenbelt Festival opens in Cheltenham.
- 9 September – The entire catalogue of The Beatles is re-released as digital remasters with rare pictures, short documentaries, original and newly written liner notes with replicated original UK artwork for the first time since 1987.
  - The Beatles: Rock Band is released.
- 16 September – Four of the Spice Girls reunite for dinner and drinks in London, the exception being Posh Spice, who was in Los Angeles. It was the first time all had reunited in public since their "Return of the Spice Girls Tour" in 2007/8.
- 21 September – Sugababes singer Keisha Buchanan leaves the group, surrounding days of speculation that arguments had occurred in the band. 2009 Eurovision song contest entrant Jade Ewen replaced her, leaving no members of the group's original lineup remaining.
- 11 October – Robbie Williams makes his first appearance on TV in over three years with "Bodies" on The X Factor.
- 12 October – Ash begin releasing the first of a run of 26 singles, known as the "A-Z Series", where they would release one single every fortnight, through digital download and 7" vinyl for a year. But despite much publicity and press attention, none of the singles reach the UK Top 40.
- 24 October – Lock Up play their final show.
- 25 October – Cheryl's début solo single "Fight For This Love" reaches number one.
- 13 December – Joe McElderry wins the sixth series of The X Factor UK. Olly Murs is named runner-up, while Stacey Solomon and Danyl Johnson finish in third and fourth place respectively.
- 20 December – Rage Against the Machine takes the Christmas number one slot in the United Kingdom with "Killing in the Name", after a massive Facebook campaign to prevent the winner of The X Factor from taking the slot once again.
- 26 December – Nowhere Boy, a biopic about the young John Lennon, is released in the UK.

== Classical music ==
- Richard Barrett – Mesopotamia, for 17 instruments and electronics
- Harrison Birtwistle – The Corridor, scena for two singers and ensemble
- John Brunning – Sahara (for guitar)
- Howard Goodall – Enchanted Voices
- John Tavener
  - Tu ne sais pas, for mezzo-soprano, timpani and stings
  - The Peace that Passeth Understanding (choral)
- Mark-Anthony Turnage – Five Processionals, for clarinet, violin, cello and piano

== Opera ==
- Michael Nyman – Sparkie: Cage and Beyond

== Film and incidental music ==
- Neil Brand – The Wrecker

== Musical theatre ==
- Dreamboats and Petticoats

== Musical films ==
- Afghan Star

== Music awards ==
=== BRIT Awards ===
The 2009 BRIT Awards were hosted by James Corden, Matthew Horne and Kylie Minogue on 18 February 2009 at Earls Court Exhibition Centre in London.

- British Male Solo Artist: Paul Weller
- British Female Solo Artist: Duffy
- British Breakthrough Act: Duffy
- British Group: Elbow
- British Live Act: Iron Maiden Somewhere Back in Time World Tour
- British Single: Girls Aloud "The Promise"
- MasterCard British Album: Duffy – Rockferry
- International Male Solo Artist: Kanye West
- International Female Solo Artist: Katy Perry
- International Group: Kings of Leon
- International Album: Kings of Leon – Only By the Night
- Critic's Choice: Florence And The Machine
- Outstanding Contribution to Music: Pet Shop Boys
- Producer's Award: Bernard Butler

The Classical BRIT Awards were hosted by Myleene Klass on 14 May.

- Male of the Year: Gustavo Dudamel
- Female of the Year: Alison Balsom
- Composer of the Year: Howard Goodall
- Young British Classical Performer: Alina Ibragimova
- Album of the Year: Royal Scots Dragoon Guards Spirit of the Glen–Journey
- Soundtrack of the Year: The Dark Knight – Hans Zimmer and James Newton Howard
- Critics' Award: Sir Charles Mackerras/Scottish Chamber Orchestra – Mozart Symphonies nos. 38–41
- Lifetime Achievement in Music: José Carreras

=== British Composer Awards ===
- Contemporary Jazz Composition – Jason Yarde

=== Ivor Novello Awards ===
- Best TV soundtrack – Wallace and Gromit: A Matter of Loaf and Death
- Most performed work – Duffy, "Mercy"
- PRS most performed work – Coldplay, "Viva La Vida"
- Inspiration Award – Edwyn Collins
- Classical Music Award – James MacMillan
- Outstanding song collection – Vince Clarke
- Songwriter of the year – Eg White

=== Mercury Music Prize ===
- Speech Debelle – Speech Therapy

== Deaths ==
- 9 January – Dave Dee, singer (Dave Dee, Dozy, Beaky, Mick & Tich), 67 (prostate cancer)
- 14 January – Angela Morley, conductor and composer, 84
- 15 January – Jean Adebambo, singer, 46 (suicide)
- 29 January – John Martyn, singer/songwriter, 60
- 9 February – Vic Lewis, jazz guitarist, 89
- 19 February – Kelly Groucutt, bass guitarist (Electric Light Orchestra), 63
- 1 March – Joan Turner, singer and actress, 86
- 10 April – Richard Arnell, composer, 91
- 22 June – Steve Race, pianist and radio/television presenter, 88
- 6 July – Johnny Collins, singer, 71
- 17 July – Gordon Waller, singer (Peter and Gordon), 64
- 5 October – Mike Alexander, bassist (Evile), 32 (pulmonary embolism)
- 7 October – Helen Watts, operatic contralto, 81
- 12 October – Ian Wallace, singer, 90
- 15 November – Derek B, rapper, 44
- 24 November – Amy Black, operatic mezzo-soprano, 36 (heart condition)
- 2 December – Eric Woolfson, musician (The Alan Parsons Project), 64

== See also ==
- 2009 in British radio
- 2009 in British television
- 2009 in the United Kingdom
- List of British films of 2009
