= Sam Wood (musician) =

- Born: 26 March 1989 (age 37)
- Genre: Hard rock
- Occupations: Musician, songwriter
- Instrument: Guitar
- Years active: 2008–present
- Member of: Black Star Riders; Wayward Sons

Sam Wood (born 26 March 1989) is a British musician and songwriter, currently lead guitarist with hard rock bands Black Star Riders and Wayward Sons. After playing in several local bands in the Leeds area, he was asked to form Wayward Sons in 2017 by frontman Toby Jepson, and has since co-written and performed on three charting albums with the band. In November 2022, he joined Black Star Riders. He has also performed with Saxon and Uriah Heep.

== Early career ==
Graduating from Leeds Conservatoire in 2010, Wood was a member of various bands in Leeds before co-forming alternative rock band Treason Kings in 2012. After releasing a double A-side single, "Your Suit", they released two EPs produced by former Little Angels frontman Toby Jepson. They performed on the BBC Introducing stage at the Reading and Leeds Festivals in 2015, and the following year they supported L7 on their UK tour.

== Wayward Sons ==
When Frontiers Records contacted Toby Jepson in 2016 regarding a return to music after a hiatus, he recruited Wood as lead guitarist for his new project. Shortly after the band's first live performances, their first album, Ghosts of Yet to Come was released in September 2017. Co-written by the whole band, the album reached number 71 in the official UK charts. Among their live shows during 2017 and 2018 the band played in support of UFO and Saxon.

The band's second album, The Truth Ain't What It Used to Be, was released in 2019, and reached number 69 on the UK chart, and number 3 in the UK Rock & Metal Chart. Tours followed supporting Black Star Riders across the UK and Germany, and Steel Panther across Europe. In 2021, a third album, Even Up the Score, reached number 98 in the UK, and number 2 in the UK Rock & Metal Chart. The band also opened the main stage at the 2022 Download Festival, after a scheduled appearance at the 2020 festival was cancelled due to the COVID-19 pandemic.

In 2018, as a side project, Wood co-formed punk rock band Land Sharks, which includes bass guitarist Steve Firth and drummer Mike Heaton, both from Embrace. The band supported Embrace at three shows on their The Good Will Out 21st Anniversary Tour in 2019.

In 2022, Wood became the live guitarist for The Dead Collective, who supported The Answer on their UK tour in March 2023. He also appeared on Brown's second EP, "Prologue", on the track "Sinking Ship".

== Black Star Riders ==
In May 2022, Wood performed with Black Star Riders and Thin Lizzy frontman Ricky Warwick's solo band, the Fighting Hearts, for a number of shows across the UK, standing in for Ben Christo.

In November, he joined Black Star Riders after the departure of Christian Martucci in June. He toured the UK with the band in February 2023, alongside returning members Scott Gorham and Jimmy DeGrasso. Wood remains a member of Wayward Sons alongside his role in Black Star Riders.

On 12 August 2023, Wood performed with Saxon at the Jailbreak Festival in Denmark, standing in for Brian Tatler who was performing at a prior engagement with Diamond Head.

In January 2026, Wood was recruited by Uriah Heep to deputise for Mick Box, who was unwell. Wood performed at the band's Scandinavian dates on their current world tour.

== Discography ==
=== Treason Kings ===
- "Mother" (EP) – 2014
- "Vale" (EP) – 2016

=== Wayward Sons ===
- Ghosts of Yet to Come – 2017 (UK No. 71)
- The Truth Ain't What It Used to Be – 2019 (UK No. 69)
- Even Up the Score – 2021 (UK No. 98)
- "Score Settled" (EP) – 2022

=== Land Sharks ===
- "Dancing in the Fire" (EP) – 2019
- "Rock-A-Lips" (EP) – 2020

=== Oli Brown & The Dead Collective ===
- "Prologue" (EP) – 2023 (on one track "Sinking Ship")
