= Heavy Fire (album) =

Studio album by Black Star Riders
- Released: February 3, 2017
- Recorded: Autumn 2016; Nashville, Tennessee, U.S.
- Genre: Hard rock
- Length: 40:04
- Label: Nuclear Blast
- Producer: Nick Raskulinecz

Black Star Riders chronology
The Killer Instinct (2015)	Heavy Fire (2017)	Another State of Grace (2019)

Singles from Heavy Fire
- 1. "When the Night Comes In" Released: November 16, 2016; 2. "Testify or Say Goodbye" Released: January 5, 2017; 3. "Heavy Fire" Released: January 30, 2017; 4. "Dancing with the Wrong Girl" Released: April 6, 2017

Heavy Fire is the third studio album by hard rock band Black Star Riders, released on February 3, 2017. Black Star Riders evolved from the touring version of Thin Lizzy, assembled by guitarist Scott Gorham after the death of Thin Lizzy's leader Phil Lynott. The band's first two albums, All Hell Breaks Loose and The Killer Instinct, were released in 2013 and 2015 respectively.

It was the last Black Star Riders album to feature guitarist/songwriter Damon Johnson and drummer Jimmy DeGrasso, both of whom had been with the band since its inception. The standard edition of the album concluded with the first Black Star Riders song not to feature Johnson as a co-writer.

== Recording ==
Continuing to work with producer Nick Raskulinecz after the success of The Killer Instinct, Heavy Fire was recorded at Raskulinecz' studio outside Nashville, Tennessee in the autumn of 2016. Gorham said, "Not many new bands get to record three albums these days. Without doubt this is BSR's best album so far. We had a great time recording it and can't wait to play the new songs live on tour in March."

The album was marketed via PledgeMusic, and its release was followed in March 2017 by a full UK tour supported by Gun, The Amorettes and Backyard Babies sharing the opening support slots.

The first single from the album, "When the Night Comes In", was premiered on Planet Rock radio on November 15, 2016. The follow-up single, "Testify or Say Goodbye", was first played on BBC Radio 2 by Ken Bruce on January 5, 2017.

== Content ==
"Dancing With the Wrong Girl" and "Cold War Love" are the first Black Star Riders songs to feature bassist Robbie Crane credited as a composer. Heavy Fire is Crane's second album with the group.

"Letting Go of Me" is the first Black Star Riders song not to be co-written by Damon Johnson.

Damon Johnson contributes mellotron on unspecified tracks while producer Nick Raskulinecz plays on "Letting Go of Me". "Testify or Say Goodbye" features organ from session musician Fred Mandel.

== Track listing ==
No.	Title	Writer(s)	Length
1.	"Heavy Fire"	Ricky Warwick, Damon Johnson, Scott Gorham	4:28
2.	"When the Night Comes In"	Warwick, Johnson	3:16
3.	"Dancing with the Wrong Girl"	Warwick, Johnson, Robbie Crane	3:22
4.	"Who Rides the Tiger"	Warwick, Johnson	4:21
5.	"Cold War Love"	Warwick, Johnson, Crane	4:06
6.	"Testify or Say Goodbye"	Warwick, Johnson	4:18
7.	"Thinking About You Could Get Me Killed"	Warwick, Johnson	3:39
8.	"True Blue Kid"	Warwick, Johnson, Gorham	4:18
9.	"Ticket to Rise"	Warwick, Johnson	4:39
10.	"Letting Go of Me"	Warwick	3:45

Bonus track
No.	Title	Writer(s)	Length
11.	"Fade"	Warwick, Johnson	4:23

== Personnel ==
- Ricky Warwick – lead vocals, rhythm guitar
- Scott Gorham – lead and rhythm guitar
- Damon Johnson – lead and rhythm guitar, lap steel, mellotron, backing vocals
- Robbie Crane – bass guitar
- Jimmy DeGrasso – drums
- Wendy Moten, Gale Mayes, Drea Rhenee – backing vocals on tracks 2 and 9
- Pearl Aday – backing vocals on track 6
- Fred Mandel – Hammond B3 organ on track 6
- Nick Raskulinecz – mellotron on track 10

== Charts ==
Chart (2017)	Peak position
Austrian Albums (Ö3 Austria)	63
Belgian Albums (Ultratop Flanders)	97
Belgian Albums (Ultratop Wallonia)	72
French Albums (SNEP)	167
German Albums (Offizielle Top 100)	11
Irish Albums (IRMA)	60
Scottish Albums (OCC)	2
Swiss Albums (Schweizer Hitparade)	21
UK Albums (OCC)	6
UK Independent Albums (OCC)	1
UK Rock & Metal Albums (OCC)	1
