= Another State of Grace =

Studio album by Black Star Riders
- Released: September 6, 2019
- Recorded: February 2019; Los Angeles
- Genre: Hard rock
- Length: 38:46
- Label: Nuclear Blast
- Producer: Jay Ruston

Black Star Riders chronology
Heavy Fire (2017)	Another State of Grace (2019)	Wrong Side of Paradise (2023)

Singles from Another State of Grace
- 1. "Another State of Grace" Released: May 23, 2019; 2. "Ain't the End of the World" Released: July 12, 2019; 3. "Tonight the Moonlight Let Me Down" Released: September 6, 2019; 4. "Candidate for Heartbreak" Released: May 29, 2020

Another State of Grace is the fourth studio album by hard rock band Black Star Riders, released on September 6, 2019. Black Star Riders evolved from the touring version of Thin Lizzy, assembled by guitarist Scott Gorham after the death of Thin Lizzy's leader Phil Lynott. The band's first three albums, All Hell Breaks Loose, The Killer Instinct, and Heavy Fire, were released in 2013, 2015, and 2017 respectively.

It is the first Black Star Riders album to feature new guitarist/songwriter Christian Martucci, the only one to feature drummer Chad Szeliga, and the final one to feature founding guitarist Scott Gorham, who announced his departure from the group on September 20, 2021.

Upon its release, the album reached number one in the UK Rock & Metal Albums Chart.

== Recording ==
After working with producer Nick Raskulinecz on their previous two albums, Another State of Grace was produced by Jay Ruston, who had mixed the previous two albums. Gorham welcomed Ruston as producer: "It was the best decision we’ve ever made as a band... You know he’s pushing you, but he does it in such a way that you really don’t mind and you want to play better for him."

== Track listing ==
Another State of Grace track listing
No.	Title	Writer(s)	Length
1.	"Tonight the Moonlight Let Me Down"	Ricky Warwick, Scott Gorham, Christian Martucci	3:54
2.	"Another State of Grace"	Warwick, Martucci	3:39
3.	"Ain't the End of the World"	Warwick, Martucci	3:30
4.	"Underneath the Afterglow"	Warwick, Gorham, Jesse Siebenberg	3:40
5.	"Soldier in the Ghetto"	Warwick, Martucci	4:37
6.	"Why Do You Love Your Guns?"	Warwick	4:58
7.	"Standing in the Line of Fire"	Warwick, Robbie Crane, Martucci	3:08
8.	"What Will It Take?"	Warwick	4:11
9.	"In the Shadow of the War Machine"	Warwick, Martucci	3:30
10.	"Poisoned Heart"	Warwick	3:39
Total length:			38:46

Japan bonus track
No.	Title	Length
11.	"Candidate for Heartbreak"	3:37
Total length:		42:30

== Personnel ==
- Ricky Warwick – lead vocals, rhythm guitar
- Scott Gorham – lead and rhythm guitar
- Christian Martucci – lead and rhythm guitar, backing vocals
- Robbie Crane – bass guitar
- Chad Szeliga – drums
- Michael Monroe – saxophone on track 1
- Pearl Aday – vocals on track 8

== Charts ==
Chart (2019)	Peak position
Belgian Albums (Ultratop Wallonia)	103
German Albums (Offizielle Top 100)	23
Irish Albums (IRMA)	49
Japanese Albums (Oricon)	145
Scottish Albums (OCC)	3
Swiss Albums (Schweizer Hitparade)	32
UK Albums (OCC)	14
UK Independent Albums (OCC)	3
UK Rock & Metal Albums (OCC)	1
