= Wayward Sons (band) =

British rock band

- Genres: Hard rock
- Years active: 2017–present
- Labels: Frontiers
- Members: Toby Jepson; Nic Wastell; Sam Wood; Phil 'Martini' Martin
- Past members: Dave Kemp

Wayward Sons are a British rock band formed in 2017 by former Little Angels frontman Toby Jepson. The band also features lead guitarist Sam Wood, bass guitarist Nic Wastell and drummer Phil 'Martini' Martin. Keyboardist Dave Kemp was also a member until his departure in 2021. Wayward Sons have so far released three albums, all of which have charted in the official UK top 100.

== History ==
Frontiers Music SRL approached Jepson in 2016 with a view to resurrecting his musical career after a lengthy hiatus, recognising his ability as a talented vocalist and songwriter. Jepson had made a promise to himself that should such an opportunity ever arise, it was to be on his own terms. Frontiers' offer allowed for such, and twelve months later Jepson had created a fully formed, five-piece rock outfit. Jepson recruited four musicians to be part of the new project. Jepson had met guitarist Sam Wood while producing for Wood's Leeds-based group Treason Kings. Despite his youth, Jepson saw Wood as an exceptionally gifted guitarist who would be perfect for the modern yet classic sound he desired for his new band. Bass guitarist Nic Wastell and Jepson had been friends since the Little Angels days, sharing the same record label before Little Angels signed to Polydor in the late 80s. Jepson had produced two albums for Wastell's band Chrome Molly. Wastell is renowned for his on-stage energy. Jepson had been impressed by London drummer Phil 'Martini' Martin after seeing him perform at the High Voltage Festival in 2010 with Joe Elliott's Down 'n' Outz, and Jepson has since said that Martin was the only drummer considered for the job. Keyboard player Dave Kemp was originally part of the 'Big Bad Horns' section of Little Angels, playing saxophone and touring with the band through their most successful period – the Jam album era. Kemp and Jepson had been song co-writers for years.

On 26 July, 2017, 'the Sons' performed their first live gig at The Louisiana in Bristol, UK.

=== Ghosts of Yet to Come ===
On 15 September, 2017 Wayward Sons released Ghosts of Yet to Come, their debut album on Frontiers Records. Recorded and co-mixed by Jepson and Chris D'Adda at Vale Studios, Worcestershire, UK, the album was well-received by the UK music press and under-projected sales caused Frontiers to temporarily run out of stock. The album reached number 71 in the official UK charts and number 21 in the iTunes chart, many fans complaining that unavailability had hindered a better chart position. On 9 October 2017, Frontiers released a second batch of the album which promptly sold out again. The album featured unique and memorable artwork created by graphic artist Stuart Dilley, which served as a backdrop for the "theme" of the work, namely that of a zombie apocalypse, backed up by a quintology of music videos following that theme. A collectible comic-book was also available which mimicked the video story on paper.

On 5 December 2017, Wayward Sons were shortlisted for Planet Rock's 'Live Band of the Year', an award they went on to win.

=== The Truth Ain't What It Used to Be ===
In December 2018 production began on the band's second album The Truth Ain't What It Used to Be, again at Vale Studios. Jepson wrote 56 songs for the album, of which 30 were recorded (at least in part), the final cut being decided by which songs were thought to sit best together on a record. The album was released on 11 October 2019, reaching number 69 on the UK chart, with the debut single "Joke's on You" immediately making the playlist at Planet Rock. A second collectible comic-book was released to commemorate and promote the album.

Once more, a series of themed videos were created to tell the story of the album – again based on the artwork of Stuart Dilley – this time featuring maniacal circus clowns to represent figures of power and their blinkered followers, and explore the relationship with the common man. Jepson both directed and starred in the videos alongside his daughter, actor Madeleine Grace. When asked about the album, Jepson said "...a borderline concept album that examines the post-truth phenomenon and the state of the world and its leadership..." Like much of Jepson's previous music, this was seen to be a political protest record.

To promote the album, Wayward Sons toured as support for Living Colour, Saxon and Black Star Riders in the UK, and Steel Panther across mainland Europe. Unfortunately, the global outbreak of the Coronavirus COVID-19 scuppered plans for a headline tour, and also killed off an opening slot on the main stage at Download Festival 2020.

=== Even Up the Score ===
The band used the downtime created by the pandemic to work on their third album Even Up the Score, again penned by Jepson with contributions from all members. Once again recorded at Vale Studios, this time around much of the work was handled by Jepson at his home studio "Strangeplace" due to restrictions caused by the Covid pandemic. During the production phase, it was announced that Dave Kemp would no longer be an active part of the band due to health issues. A decision was made not to replace him and the band would continue to record and perform live as a four piece.

On 6 August 2021, Jepson featured in an hour-long interview by music journalist Rocktavia for the Rocknews website, giving details about himself, the band, and the upcoming album with a view to promoting to an international audience.

After the release of singles "Big Day", "Faith In Fools", "Even Up the Score" and "Bloody Typical", the third album was released on 8 October 2021 and immediately placed at number 2 in the UK Rock & Metal Charts, number 6 in the UK Independent Charts, and number 19 in the UK Vinyl Charts. It reached number 98 on the UK national chart. A third comic-book was released with the album, containing new material alongside reworked content from the first two episodes. Jepson produced a track-by-track guide to the album which was published on LouderSound's "Classic Rock" website.

=== Score Settled (E.P) ===
The seven-track "Score Settled" EP followed the release of their third studio album, Even Up The Score, which was released on October 2021. Released on 17 June 2022, it featured three new, unreleased songs that were recorded during the sessions for Even Up The Score as well as three tracks that were previously only released on a physical format, and a live studio version of a track previously released as a studio bonus track in Japan.

== Discography ==
- Ghosts of Yet to Come (2017) – UK #71
- The Truth Ain't What It Used to Be (2019) – UK #69
- Even Up the Score (2021) – UK #98
- Score Settled (E.P) (2022)

== Members ==
- Toby Jepson – lead vocals, rhythm guitar
- Sam Wood – lead guitar, backing vocals
- Nic Wastell – bass guitar, backing vocals
- Phil "Martini" Martin – drums, percussion, backing vocals

=== Former members ===
- Dave Kemp – keyboards, hammond organ, piano (2017–2021)
