= Black Star Riders =

American hard rock band

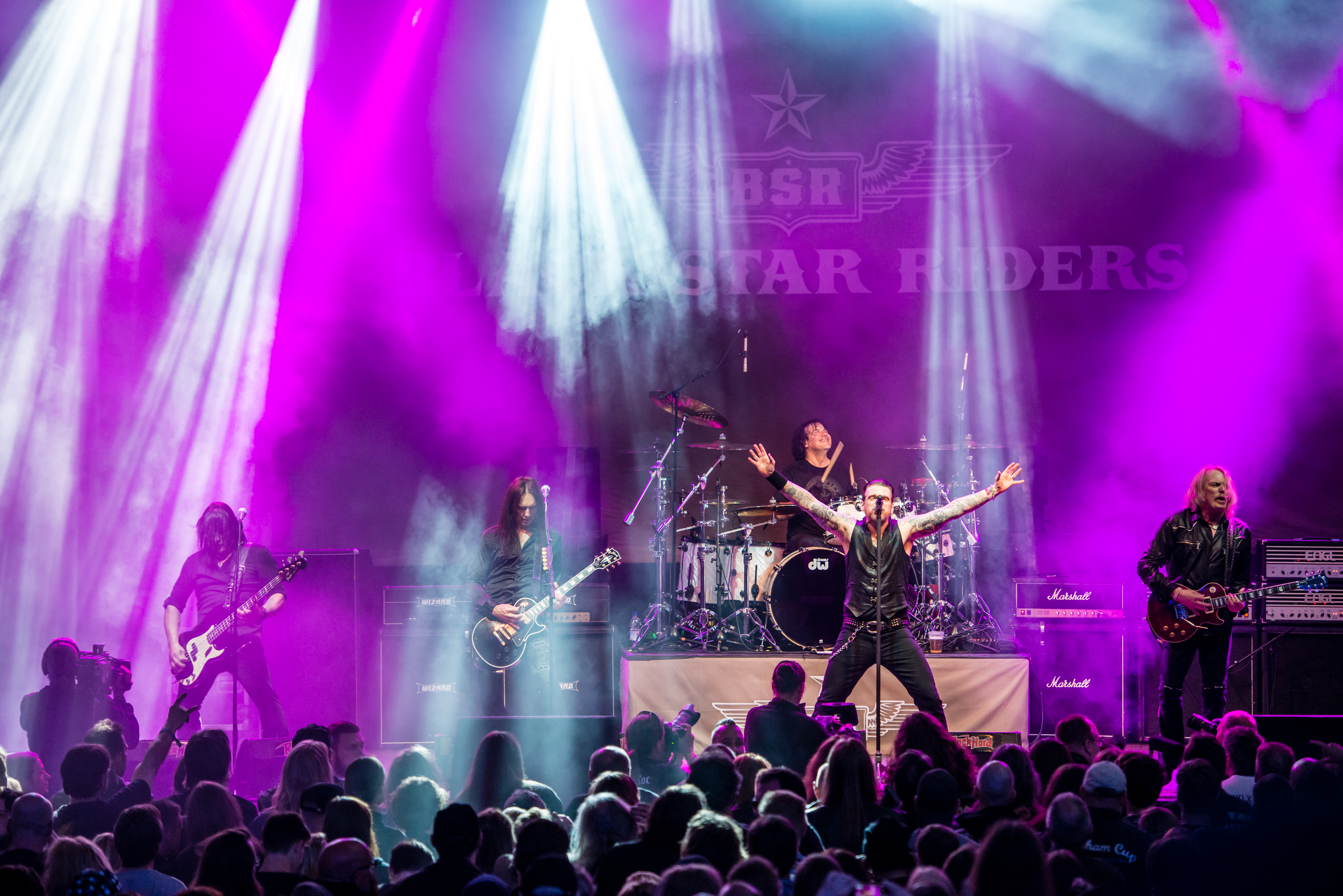
- Black Star Riders (Crane, Johnson, DeGrasso, Warwick, and Gorham) performing in Gelsenkirchen, May 2015

Background information
- Genre: Hard rock
- Years active: 2012–present
- Labels: Nuclear Blast; Earache
- Spinoff of: Thin Lizzy
- Members: Ricky Warwick; Robbie Crane; Zak St. John; Sam Wood; Marco Mendoza (touring); Jimmy DeGrasso (touring)
- Past members: Damon Johnson; Scott Gorham; Chad Szeliga; Christian Martucci
- Website: blackstarriders.com

Black Star Riders is a hard rock band formed in December 2012. The band began when members of the 2011–2012 line-up of Thin Lizzy decided to record new material, but chose not to release it under the Thin Lizzy name. While Thin Lizzy continued on an occasional basis, Black Star Riders is a full-time band, described as "the next step in the evolution of the Thin Lizzy story". The band's first album, All Hell Breaks Loose, was released on May 21, 2013, and the follow-up album, The Killer Instinct was released on February 20, 2015. The band's third album, Heavy Fire, was released on February 3, 2017, and reached number six on the UK Albums Chart.

Black Star Riders is fronted by Ricky Warwick, and originally featured lead guitarist Scott Gorham and bass guitarist Marco Mendoza. Mendoza was replaced by Robbie Crane in 2014. Drummer and founding member Jimmy DeGrasso left the band in March 2017, and was replaced a few weeks later by Chad Szeliga. Another founding member, lead guitarist Damon Johnson, left the band at the end of 2018 to be replaced by Christian Martucci. Gorham and Szeliga left the band in September 2021, the latter being replaced by Zak St. John. Gorham was not replaced, leaving the band as a quartet. Martucci left in June 2022, and was replaced in November by Wayward Sons guitarist Sam Wood. Mendoza and DeGrasso still tour with the band on an occasional basis.

On September 20, 2021, the band announced a new worldwide multi-record album deal with Earache Records and that they would be entering the studio in October 2021 to begin recording a new album.

On June 6, 2022, the band announced their new album Wrong Side of Paradise, as well as a 10th anniversary UK tour. Scott Gorham and Jimmy DeGrasso rejoined the band for the UK tour dates as part of the 10th anniversary commemorations.

== Background ==
In May 2010, Thin Lizzy lead guitarist Scott Gorham announced the latest incarnation of the group, which had toured sporadically with various line-ups since 1996, after the death of band leader Phil Lynott in 1986. This marked the return of the original drummer Brian Downey and longtime keyboardist Darren Wharton, joining Gorham, bassist Marco Mendoza, and vocalist and occasional guitarist Ricky Warwick. The other lead guitarist role was initially filled by Vivian Campbell, then by Richard Fortus, before Damon Johnson joined the band in August 2011. As the band toured throughout 2011 and 2012, they composed new material for possible release as a Thin Lizzy studio album, and demos were recorded in June 2012.

In October 2012, it was announced that the new material would not be recorded under the Thin Lizzy name and that a new band name would be used for the new songs. According to Gorham, this was "out of respect to Phil Lynott and the legacy he created", though he confirmed that the new material would feature the classic Thin Lizzy sound. He later confirmed that the decision was taken by himself and Downey, with the support of the other members of the band, and that the Thin Lizzy estate (controlled by Lynott's widow Caroline) had also been uncomfortable about new Thin Lizzy studio recordings. Warwick has acknowledged that a significant portion of Thin Lizzy fans were also against the idea of Thin Lizzy studio recordings without Lynott. He later confirmed that he had been troubled by the idea of using the Thin Lizzy name, and that as a fan, had the band recorded an album under the Thin Lizzy name with another singer, he would have been against it.

As the new material was being written, it became clear that Downey and Wharton would not be involved when the final recordings were made. Downey required a break from the heavy touring schedule, and Wharton wanted to return to his own band Dare, and to work on a film project. Warwick confirmed, "Brian and Darren just don't want to be on the road 150 days a year, and that's completely understandable. But we do."

Gorham has stated that Thin Lizzy will still perform as a band in the future: "Thin Lizzy isn't gonna die," he said. With reference to the much-publicised Lizzy "farewell" tour in late 2012, Warwick confirmed, "All that 'farewell' meant is that we're not going to do 150 Lizzy shows a year... those were just the last shows for a while." Thin Lizzy completed a short tour of Australia in March 2013, with Downey and Wharton as part of the line-up.

== Black Star Riders ==
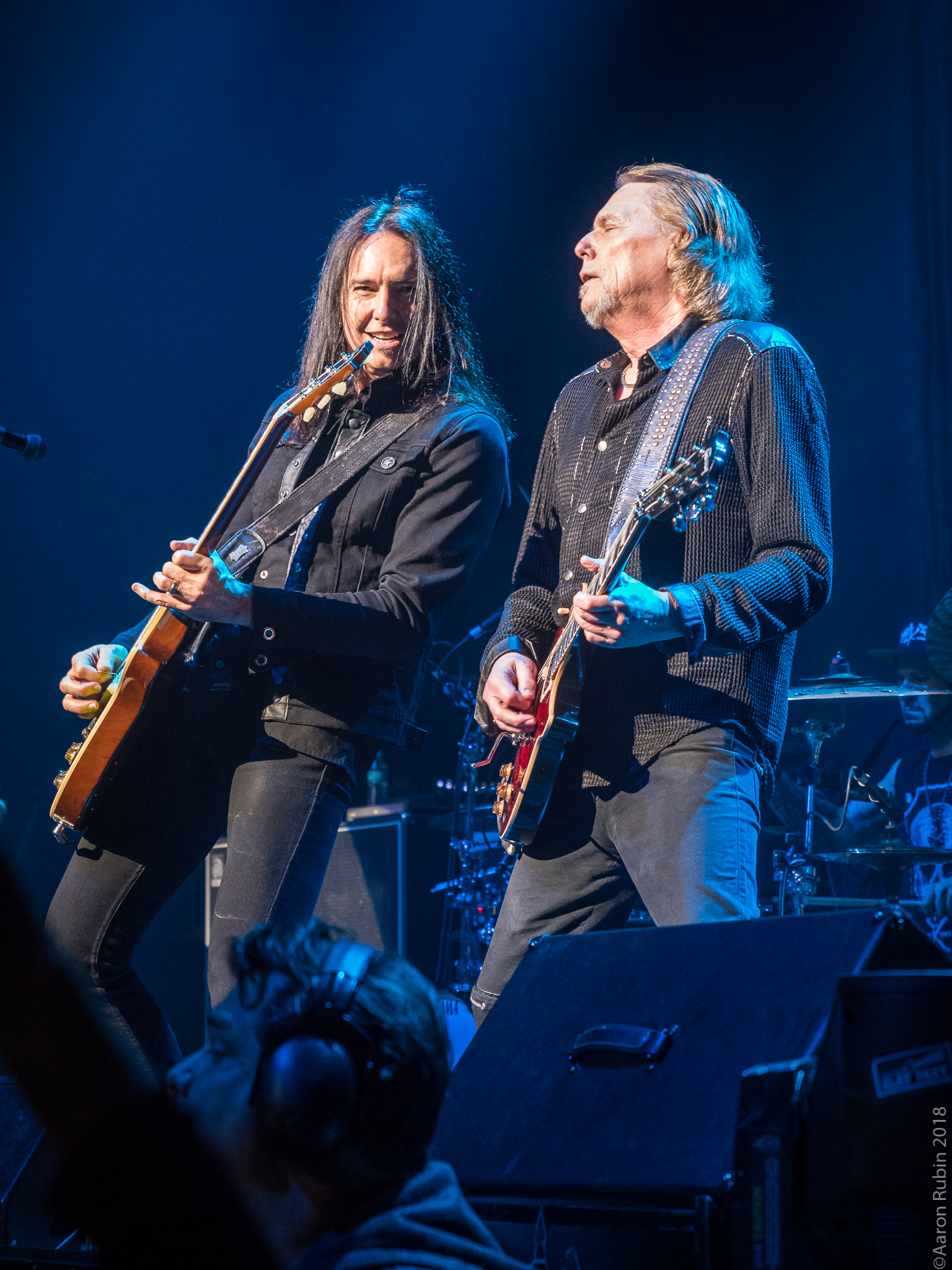
Johnson and Gorham at The Warfield Theater in San Francisco, April 19, 2018

Damon Johnson has revealed that Gorham was against any name for the new band that was related to Thin Lizzy, "because this band has to stand on its own". Warwick named the band after a gang of outlaws in the 1993 western film Tombstone, and the new name was announced on December 20, 2012.

The band initially consisted of Gorham and Johnson on lead guitar, Mendoza on bass guitar, with Warwick acting as vocalist and occasional guitarist. The band brought in Jimmy DeGrasso on drums, but no keyboard player was recruited, with Gorham stating, "I don't think we are actually going to have keyboards in Black Star Riders. You never know what's going to happen down the road but that is the set-up right now with that."

All the founding members are American with the exception of Warwick, who is from Northern Ireland. Each had previously achieved success with other acts – Gorham with all incarnations of Thin Lizzy since 1974 and with 21 Guns; Warwick with The Almighty; Johnson with Brother Cane and Alice Cooper; Mendoza with Blue Murder, fronted by another ex-Thin Lizzy member, John Sykes; and DeGrasso with several acts including Megadeth, Suicidal Tendencies, White Lion and Alice Cooper. Gorham is the only member of Black Star Riders to have been a member of Thin Lizzy while Phil Lynott led the band and thus the only one to have appeared on a Thin Lizzy studio album.

=== All Hell Breaks Loose ===
The band recorded their debut album All Hell Breaks Loose with producer Kevin Shirley in Los Angeles during January 2013, with worldwide release dates confirmed for late May. Fifteen songs were recorded, composed mostly by Johnson with Warwick providing the lyrics, with input from Gorham and Mendoza. While Gorham insists that the new band could not sound like Thin Lizzy without Lynott, both Johnson and Warwick believe that the new material has a "classic Lizzy vibe". Twelve tracks were ultimately used for the album, including one bonus track for a special edition CD.

Recording began on January 8, 2013, with one track being laid down each day. Recording was completed on January 20, and the photography for the album and promotional material was also completed at that time, with American music photographer Robert John. Mixing of the album took place in February 2013. Gorham later stated that recording twelve songs in twelve days was "kind of a pressurised situation" and that the band would probably not record that way again in the future, but he added that it was fun and the results were positive. The first single was "Bound for Glory", which received its first airplay on March 21, on Ken Bruce's mid-morning show on BBC Radio 2 in the UK. The single was released on March 24.

=== Touring and The Killer Instinct ===
Appearances at festivals accompanied the album release in the summer of 2013, followed by a worldwide tour. In an interview in December 2012, Gorham confirmed that the new group would still pay homage to their Thin Lizzy origins: "Obviously because everybody knows where we came from and what we do, it is kind of a must. We will be playing most of the Black Star Riders album but I don't think we'd get away without playing a few Thin Lizzy songs."

On June 3, 2013, Download Festival promoter Andy Copping announced via social networks that the band would replace Buckcherry at Download 2013.

Black Star Riders played their first concert on May 30, 2013 at the Marshall Amps Theatre, Bletchley in Milton Keynes, and later appeared at the Hi Rock Festival in Germany on June 1–2, followed by the Sweden Rock Festival on June 8 and Download on June 15. Another festival date was played at Hard Rock Hell in North Wales on November 29, coming during a run of 39 shows around Europe and the UK during October–December. In 2014, the band played 13 shows in the US during May, followed by three dates in Japan on May 20–22, followed by 25 further shows in the US. The band then returned to Europe for 19 shows in the UK, Germany, Norway and Sweden in July and August.

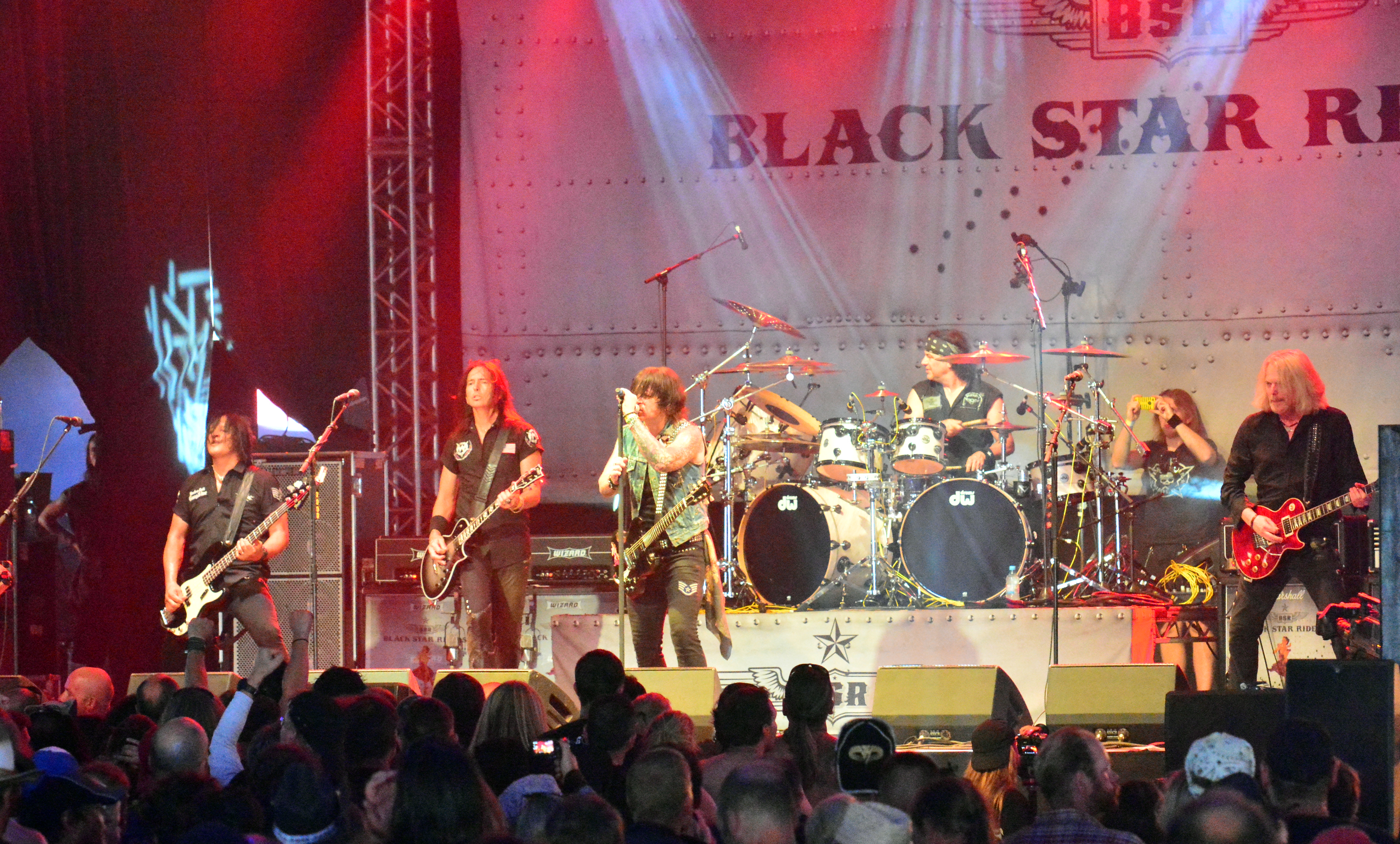
Black Star Riders performing at Wacken Open Air 2014

Recording for a second album was announced during late 2013, and on January 27, 2014, it was announced the band's second album would be recorded in Dublin in October, and would be produced by Def Leppard vocalist Joe Elliott. Elliott had previously worked on Ricky Warwick's solo albums, and also with Scott Gorham on archival Thin Lizzy releases. However, Elliott pulled out of the project in August due to conflicts with Def Leppard's schedule. He was quickly replaced by Nick Raskulinecz, and recording took place in Nashville, Tennessee in September. The album was released on February 20, 2015.

On May 30, 2014, it was announced that Marco Mendoza would be leaving the band to pursue other projects. He officially left Black Star Riders after the end of the US tour on June 22. His replacement is Robbie Crane, formerly of Ratt and Lynch Mob. Mendoza said, "I am sorry to be leaving the band but I feel it's time for me to pursue other avenues, some of which I have already been working with, all of which I am very excited about. I wish the guys all success in the future and I am very happy that my friend Robbie Crane will continue to blaze with BSR." Gorham and Warwick confirmed that the separation was amicable. In January 2015, Warwick recalled that Crane played "The Boys Are Back in Town" at his audition for the band, and Gorham had felt it had been the closest to the original since Phil Lynott had played it.

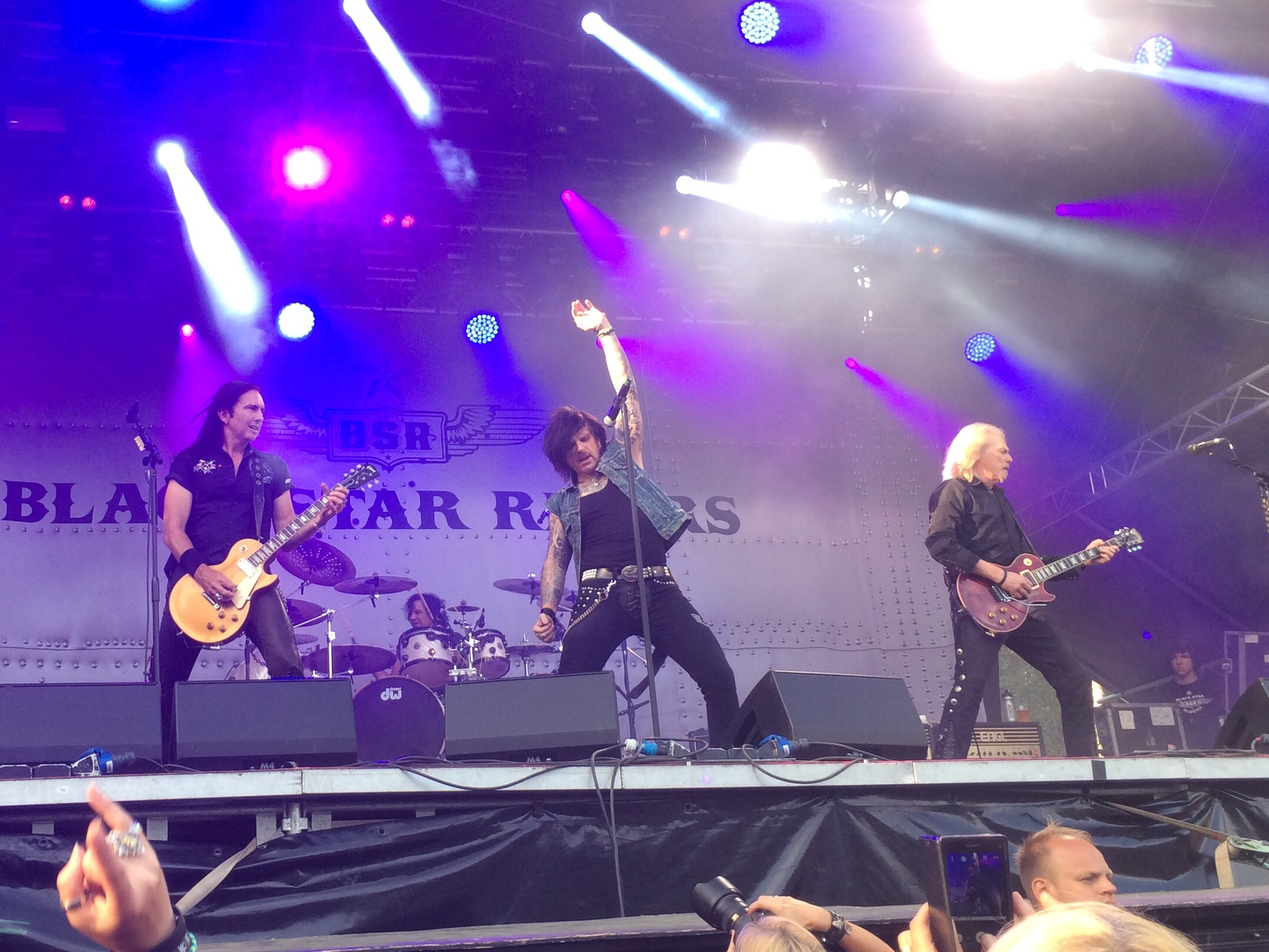
Black Star Riders performing in 2014

On November 21, 2014, the second album was named as The Killer Instinct and would feature ten tracks. Johnson explained how producer Raskulinecz had examined all the songs the band had written prior to recording, and ensured that the band "focused on the material to best represent Black Star Riders in 2015." The album release was followed in March 2015 by a 14-date tour of the UK co-headlining with Europe, supported by The Amorettes.

On January 29, 2015, it was announced by Planet Rock Radio that the Black Star Riders had been confirmed and would be appearing at Planet Rockstock in June in Marrakesh, Morocco. In March 2015, a tour of the UK and Ireland with Def Leppard and Whitesnake was announced for December, preceded by a European tour in November.

=== Heavy Fire ===
In January 2016, Ricky Warwick revealed that recording for the third album would begin later in the year, again produced by Raskulinecz, with release scheduled for early 2017. In August, it was revealed that the title of the third album would be Heavy Fire, and the release would be accompanied by a sixteen-date tour of the UK and Ireland in March 2017. Support on the tour was provided by Gun, plus The Amorettes on the first five dates, with Backyard Babies on the remaining eleven.

The first single from Heavy Fire, "When the Night Comes In", was first broadcast on Planet Rock radio in the UK on November 16, 2016. The album was released on February 3, 2017, and reached #6 in the UK, and #11 in Germany. In March 2017, one month after its release, the album won a Planet Rock award for Best British Album.

==== Lineup changes ====
It was announced on March 29, 2017 that Jimmy DeGrasso had left the band by mutual consent, having completed the UK tour. On May 5, prior to the European tour, ex-Breaking Benjamin and Black Label Society member Chad Szeliga was announced as Black Star Riders' new drummer.

After further touring in the US, it was announced that Johnson would be leaving the band at the end of 2018 to concentrate on his solo career and session work. His replacement was to be Christian Martucci of Stone Sour. The band undertook a tour of South America in November with Luke Morley of Thunder deputising for Johnson, before Johnson returned for further performances in the UK at the end of the year. Martucci joined the band in the studio in early 2019 to record their fourth album, Another State of Grace. Johnson stated, "Three excellent albums in six years with this great band is one of the proudest achievements of my career, and it has been glorious." He will continue to work with Thin Lizzy and with Warwick as part of the Warwick Johnson acoustic duo.

=== Another State of Grace ===
The band's fourth album, Another State of Grace was released on September 6, 2019, and was accompanied by a tour of the UK and Europe. It is the first of their albums to feature Martucci, and ultimately the only album to feature Szeliga, and was produced by Jay Ruston.

=== Lineup changes and Wrong Side of Paradise ===
On September 20, 2021, the band announced a new worldwide multi-record album deal with Earache Records and that they would be entering the studio in October 2021 to begin recording a new album, which would again to be produced by Jay Ruston.

Ricky Warwick commented, "We are extremely pleased to announce our new deal with Earache Records. We had an amazing eight years with Nuclear Blast and I want to thank everyone there for their commitment and dedication during this time, but it was time to part ways and Earache have well and truly stepped up to the plate! We can’t wait to start the new relationship with the great team there."

It was also announced that Gorham and Szeliga were to leave the band, with Gorham wishing to concentrate on Thin Lizzy. He will not be replaced, leaving the band as a quartet with Warwick handling some of the lead guitar parts alongside Christian Martucci. Szeliga was replaced by Los Angeles-based session player Zak St. John.

Warwick stated, "We are very sorry to see Scott go but we discussed a very heavy world touring commitment on the new record and Scott decided he wanted to concentrate just on Thin Lizzy – and being the legend he is none of us can blame him. We all wish him the best and he will be looking to put Thin Lizzy back out on the road from 2022 onwards with a busy schedule, so he won’t be missing me too much!"

Martucci added, "We can’t wait to see all our fans and followers again after what seems like an eternity off the road and we appreciate no end their continued support and loyalty to BSR."

On June 6, 2022, the band announced their next album, Wrong Side of Paradise, would be released on January 20, 2023. The album was announced alongside a new track and video "Better Than Saturday Night", as well as a 10th Anniversary UK tour for February 2023. Scott Gorham and Jimmy DeGrasso were to rejoin the band for the UK tour dates as part of the 10th Anniversary commemorations. "Better Than Saturday Night" was premiered globally via Planet Rock Radio. The tour featured Phil Campbell and the Bastard Sons and Michael Monroe as support.

It was also announced that Christian Martucci would be exiting the band to focus on his work with Stone Sour and Corey Taylor. Warwick said of Martucci's exit: "When we brought Christian Martucci into the fold in 2018 we had planned to work the BSR cycle in rotation with Christian’s Corey Taylor / Stone Sour gig so he could do both. The two year break in live music has unfortunately put paid to this plan and Christian has had to leave Black Star Riders to concentrate on his work with Corey. We wish him all the best and he will forever remain part of the BSR family."

On November 28, Wayward Sons guitarist Sam Wood was announced as Martucci's replacement. Warwick stated, "I had Sam join me for some Fighting Hearts dates a few months back and knew he was the guy for us... Black Star Riders have had some of the world's finest guitar players in their ranks and Sam is truly up there as one of them. We couldn't be happier!" Wood featured in the video for the band's next single, "Riding Out the Storm", released on December 2. Wood remains a member of Wayward Sons alongside his role in Black Star Riders.

In 2024, the band announced a one-off show at KK's Steel Mill in Wolverhampton on November 15, to mark the 25th anniversary of Planet Rock. For this performance, the band consisted of Warwick, Wood and DeGrasso, with bass guitarist Marco Mendoza returning after ten years as Crane is busy with other commitments. A new single, "Why Are the Rats?", was released on July 26. The song was recorded during the Wrong Side of Paradise sessions in 2021 and features Warwick, Martucci, Crane and St. John.

The same lineup of Warwick, Wood, Mendoza and DeGrasso will tour across mainland Europe in September and October 2026 as part of a double-headline tour with Tyketto.

== Personnel ==
- Ricky Warwick – lead vocals, rhythm guitar, acoustic guitar (2012–present), lead guitar (2021–present)
- Robbie Crane – bass guitar, backing vocals (2014–present)
- Zak St. John – drums (2021–present)
- Sam Wood – lead and rhythm guitar, backing vocals (2022–present)

== Touring members ==
- Marco Mendoza – bass guitar, backing vocals (2012–2014 (full member), 2024, 2026 (touring))
- Jimmy DeGrasso – drums, percussion (2012–2017 (full member), 2022–23, 2024, 2026 (touring))

=== Former members ===
- Scott Gorham – lead and rhythm guitars, backing vocals (2012–2021 (full member), 2022–23 (touring))
- Damon Johnson – lead and rhythm guitars, backing vocals (2012–2018)
- Chad Szeliga – drums (2017–2021)
- Christian Martucci – lead and rhythm guitars, backing vocals (2019–2022)

=== Touring members ===
- Luke Morley – guitars, backing vocals (2018)

== Discography ==
=== Albums ===
Year	Album	Peak positions								Certification
Year	Album	BEL (Wa)	FIN	FRA	GER	JPN	SWE	SWI	UK	Certification
2013	All Hell Breaks Loose	107	38	182	29	179	15	63	25	
2015	The Killer Instinct	98	—	126	23	167	29	39	13	
2017	Heavy Fire	72	—	129	11	157	—	21	6	
2019	Another State of Grace	103	—	—	23	145	—	32	14	
2023	Wrong Side of Paradise	—	—	—	23	—	—	24	6	

=== Singles ===
- "Bound for Glory" (2013)
- "Hey Judas" (2013)
- "Kingdom of the Lost" (2013)
- "The Killer Instinct" (2014)
- "Finest Hour" (2015)
- "Charlie I Gotta Go" (2015)
- "Soldierstown" (2015)
- "When the Night Comes In" (2016)
- "Testify or Say Goodbye" (2017)
- "Heavy Fire" (2017)
- "Dancing with the Wrong Girl" (2017)
- "Another State of Grace" (2019)
- "Ain't the End of the World" (2019)
- "Tonight the Moonlight Let Me Down" (2019)
- "Candidate for Heartbreak" (2020)
- "Better Than Saturday Night" (2022)
- "Pay Dirt" (2022)
- "Crazy Horses" (2022)
- "Riding Out the Storm" (2022)
- "Why Are the Rats?" (2024)
