= Wrong Side of Paradise =

Studio album by Black Star Riders
- Released: January 20, 2023
- Recorded: October 2021
- Genre: Hard rock
- Length: 41:06
- Label: Earache
- Producer: Jay Ruston

Black Star Riders chronology
Another State of Grace (2019)	Wrong Side of Paradise (2023)

Singles from Wrong Side of Paradise
- 1. "Better Than Saturday Night" Released: June 6, 2022; 2. "Pay Dirt" Released: September 7, 2022; 3. "Crazy Horses" Released: November 2, 2022; 4. "Riding Out the Storm" Released: December 2, 2022

Wrong Side of Paradise is the fifth studio album by hard rock band Black Star Riders, released on January 20, 2023.

It is the first Black Star Riders album to feature drummer Zak St. John, and the last to feature guitarist/songwriter Christian Martucci, who left the band in the summer of 2022. It is the first Black Star Riders album to be recorded without founding member Scott Gorham, who left shortly before the recording sessions.

== Release ==
On June 6, 2022, the band announced the album would be released on January 20, 2023. The album was announced alongside a new track and video "Better Than Saturday Night", as well as a 10th Anniversary UK tour for February 2023. Scott Gorham and Jimmy DeGrasso rejoined the band for the UK tour dates as part of the 10th Anniversary commemorations.

Wrong Side Of Paradise is available on multiple different formats, including limited coloured vinyl (green, blue, red and black/white split), black vinyl, signed CD, cassette and digital download. A special edition of the album containing two bonus tracks can be found on CD (which comes with a 24-page booklet) and USB stick formats. Various collector bundles are also available.

Warwick said of the new album: "I am very proud of this record, Black Star Riders fifth release and the first with our new and exciting relationship with Earache Records. As with all BSR albums, "Wrong Side Of Paradise" is an anthemic statement of intent, driven by ferocious guitars and thundering drums. I can only write about my own personal experiences, my families, my friends and how I see a world that is unravelling and changing faster than we can comprehend. That being said, I’m a firm believer in the power of positivity, something that echoes throughout this album."

"Better Than Saturday Night" was premiered globally via Planet Rock Radio. In discussing the song and its accompanying video, Warwick said: ""Better Than Saturday Night" is a feel-good, uplifting tune about staying strong in the face of adversity, being true to yourself, and the power of positivity. I wrote it for my kids, but subliminally I think I also wrote it for myself and everyone for those days when we need to find a little bit of extra strength. We wanted to reflect the positivity, power, attitude and strength to endure sentiment in the lyrics of the song. And no better way to do that than Black Star Riders rockin' out with the Los Angeles Roller Derby Dolls.”

== Track listing ==
Wrong Side of Paradise track listing
No.	Title	Writer(s)	Length
1.	"Wrong Side of Paradise"	Ricky Warwick, Christian Martucci	3:44
2.	"Hustle"	Warwick	3:27
3.	"Better Than Saturday Night"	Warwick	3:40
4.	"Riding Out the Storm"	Warwick	3:51
5.	"Pay Dirt"	Warwick, Martucci, Todd Schofield	3:45
6.	"Catch Yourself On"	Warwick, Martucci	4:18
7.	"Crazy Horses"	Alan Osmond, Merrill Osmond, Wayne Osmond	2:24
8.	"Burning Rome"	Warwick	3:49
9.	"Don't Let the World (Get in the Way)"	Warwick, Martucci	3:48
10.	"Green and Troubled Land"	Warwick, Martucci, Sam Robinson	4:50
11.	"This Life Will Be the Death of Me"	Warwick	3:30
Total length:			41:06

Special edition bonus tracks
No.	Title	Writer(s)	Length
12.	"Cut 'n' Run"	Warwick, Martucci	3:30
13.	"Suspicious Times"	Warwick, Martucci	4:05
Total length:			48:41

== Personnel ==
- Ricky Warwick – lead vocals, guitar
- Christian Martucci – lead guitar, backing vocals
- Robbie Crane – bass guitar
- Zak St. John – drums

== Charts ==
Chart (2023)	Peak position
German Albums (Offizielle Top 100)	23
Scottish Albums (OCC)	2
Swiss Albums (Schweizer Hitparade)	24
UK Albums (OCC)	6
UK Independent Albums (OCC)	2
UK Rock & Metal Albums (OCC)	1
