= Taking On the World =

Studio album by Gun
- Released: 5 July 1989
- Genre: Hard rock
- Length: 43:50
- Label: A&M
- Producer: Kenny MacDonald

Gun chronology
| Taking On the World (1989) | Gallus (1992) |

Professional ratings
Review scores
| Source | Rating |
|---|---|
| ARTISTdirect | 4/5 stars |
| Hi-Fi News & Record Review | B:2 |
| New Musical Express | 7/10 |

Taking On the World is the debut album from Scottish rock band Gun, released on 5 July 1989.

The album peaked at number 44 in the UK charts, and produced two UK Top 40 singles, "Better Days" and "Shame on You". Three other singles were released, "Money (Everybody Loves Her)", "Inside Out" and the title track "Taking On the World". All three made the UK Top 100.

The album received positive reviews upon release, including a five-star review from Kerrang! magazine, and sold over 60,000 copies. In September 2010 the album was included in Classic Rock magazine's list of the 150 Greatest Debut Albums of All Time.

To celebrate the album's 25th anniversary, it was reissued in October 2014 as a three-disc Deluxe Edition comprising the original album, B-sides, rarities, covers and BBC Sessions recordings.

In 2019, Gun celebrated the 30th anniversary of the album by embarking on "The Big 3-0 Tour", where they played the album in its entirety.

== Track listing ==
Taking On the World — original 1989 release, titled "Disc One: Taking On the World" on the 2014 deluxe edition
| No. | Title | Writer(s) | Length |
|---|---|---|---|
| 1. | "Better Days" | Giuliano Gizzi, Mark Rankin | 4:33 |
| 2. | "The Feeling Within" | Gizzi, Rankin | 4:41 |
| 3. | "Inside Out" | Gizzi, Rankin | 4:11 |
| 4. | "Money (Everybody Loves Her)" | Gizzi, Rankin | 4:34 |
| 5. | "Taking On the World" | Gizzi, Rankin | 4:50 |
| 6. | "Shame on You" | Gizzi, Rankin | 4:34 |
| 7. | "Can't Get Any Lower" | Gizzi, Rankin | 4:22 |
| 8. | "Something to Believe In" | Gizzi, Rankin | 4:38 |
| 9. | "Girls in Love" | Gizzi, Rankin | 3:16 |
| 10. | "I Will Be Waiting" | Gizzi, Rankin | 4:50 |
| Total length: | | | 43:50 |

2014 Deluxe Edition – "Disc Two: The B-Sides"
| No. | Title | Writer(s) | Length |
|---|---|---|---|
| 1. | "Prime Time" ("Money" B-side) | Gizzi, Rankin | 3:50 |
| 2. | "Dance" ("Money" B-side) | Gizzi, Rankin | 3:48 |
| 3. | "When You Love Somebody" ("Better Days" B-side) | Gizzi, Rankin | 3:22 |
| 4. | "Coming Home" ("Better Days" B-side) | Gizzi, Rankin | 4:00 |
| 5. | "Better Days" (Live, promo single) | Gizzi, Rankin | 5:29 |
| 6. | "Back to Where We Started" ("Inside Out" B-side) | Gizzi, Rankin | 3:58 |
| 7. | "Where Do We Go?" ("Inside Out" B-side) | Gizzi, Rankin | 3:25 |
| 8. | "Don't Believe a Word" (Thin Lizzy cover, "Taking On the World" B-side) | Phil Lynott | 2:23 |
| 9. | "Better Days (12" Mix)" ("Taking On the World" B-side) | Gizzi, Rankin | 6:56 |
| 10. | "Shame on You" (Andy Taylor remix) | Gizzi, Rankin | 6:05 |
| 11. | "Money (Everybody Loves Her)" (Extended Version) | Gizzi, Rankin | 7:16 |
| Total length: | | | 50:24 |

2014 Deluxe Edition – "Disc Three: BBC Sessions"
| No. | Title | Writer(s) | Length |
|---|---|---|---|
| 1. | "Shame on You" (Friday Rock Show, 26 May 1989) | Gizzi, Rankin | 4:27 |
| 2. | "Better Days" (Friday Rock Show, 26 May 1989) | Gizzi, Rankin | 3:40 |
| 3. | "Coming Home" (Friday Rock Show, 26 May 1989) | Gizzi, Rankin | 3:46 |
| 4. | "Taking On the World" (Friday Rock Show, 26 May 1989) | Gizzi, Rankin | 5:07 |
| 5. | "Shame on You" (Nicky Campbell Session, 26 June 1989) | Gizzi, Rankin | 4:18 |
| 6. | "I Will Be Waiting" (Nicky Campbell Session, 26 June 1989) | Gizzi, Rankin | 5:01 |
| 7. | "Something to Believe In" (Nicky Campbell Session, 26 June 1989) | Gizzi, Rankin | 4:23 |
| 8. | "Taking On the World" (Nicky Campbell Session, 26 June 1989) | Gizzi, Rankin | 5:01 |
| 9. | "Something to Believe In" (Mark Goodier Session, 12–15 February 1990) | Gizzi, Rankin | 4:25 |
| 10. | "Can't Get Any Lower" (Mark Goodier Session, 12–15 February 1990) | Gizzi, Rankin | 4:09 |
| 11. | "Coming Home" (Mark Goodier Session, 12–15 February 1990) | Gizzi, Rankin | 3:55 |
| 12. | "Taking On the World" (Mark Goodier Session, 12–15 February 1990) | Gizzi, Rankin | 5:24 |
| Total length: | | | 53:29 |

== Personnel ==
Adapted credits from the media notes of the 2014 reissue of Taking On the World.

- Mark Rankin – Vocals
- Giuliano Gizzi – Guitar
- Baby Stafford – Guitar
- Dante Gizzi – Bass
- Scott Shields – Drums

Additional musicians

- Sharleen Spiteri – Backing vocals (tracks 2, 10)
- Scott Fraser – Bass (tracks 7, 9)
- Alan Thornton – Backing vocals
- David Aitken – Guitar
- Jim McDermott – Drums

== Charts ==
| Chart (1989) | Peak position |
|---|---|
| New Zealand Albums (RMNZ) | 26 |
| UK Albums (OCC) | 44 |

== Certifications ==
| Region | Certification | Certified units/sales |
|---|---|---|
| United Kingdom (BPI) | Silver | 60,000^{^} |
^{^} Shipments figures based on certification alone.
