= Gallus (album) =

Studio album by Gun
- Released: 30 March 1992
- Genres: Rock, hard rock
- Length: 50:16
- Label: A&M

Gun chronology
Taking on the World (1989)	Gallus (1992)	Swagger (1994)

Gallus is the second album from Scottish rock band Gun. Singles "Higher Ground", "Steal Your Fire", and "Welcome to the Real World" reached No. 48, #24, and No. 43 on the British charts, respectively. Gallus itself peaked at the No. 14 slot on the country's official albums chart.

The release's cover shows Benny Lynch. A renowned Scottish boxer from Glasgow, he achieved international fame during his career and continued notoriety after his death in August 1946.

== Production and recording ==
The album's release took place when the group was a quintet made up of vocalist Mark Rankin alongside guitarists Alex Dickson and Giuliano Gizzi, bassist Dante Gizzi, and drummer Scott Shields.

Gallus was produced by Kenny MacDonald, who had previously produced work by singer-songwriter Lloyd Cole and the band Texas. Al Clay did the audio engineering on the album. He had previously engineered releases by artists such as the American groups Pixies (on Bossanova) and Pere Ubu (on Worlds in Collision).

== Track listing ==
1. "Steal Your Fire" – 4:53
2. "Money to Burn" – 4:44
3. "Long Road" – 5:06
4. "Welcome to the Real World" – 5:10
5. "Higher Ground" – 5:30
6. "Borrowed Time" – 4:34
7. "Freedom" – 5:05
8. "Won't Back Down" – 5:43
9. "Reach Out for Love" – 4:19
10. "Watchin' the World Go By" – 5:07

== Personnel ==
- Mark Rankin - vocals
- Dante Gizzi - bass
- Scott Shields - drums
- Alex Dickson - guitar
- Giuliano Gizzi - guitar

== See also ==
- 1992 in music
