= Swagger (Gun album) =

Studio album by Gun
- Released: 1 August 1994
- Genre: Hard rock
- Label: A&M

Gun chronology
Gallus (1992)	Swagger (1994)	0141 632 6326 (1997)

Professional ratings
Review scores
Source	Rating
AllMusic	3/5 stars
ARTISTdirect	3/5 stars
Music Week	5/5 stars
Rock Hard	9.5/10
Select	2/5 medals
Smash Hits	4/5 stars

Swagger is the third album by the Scottish rock band Gun. It features their most successful single; their cover of "Word Up!", done in the group's melodic hard rock style, provided a commercial boost to its parent album. Their version earned the band the Best Cover trophy at the first international MTV Europe Music Awards. The track was originally recorded by American funk group Cameo.

The album produced a total of four U.K. Top 40 singles between July 1994 and April 1995: "Word Up!" (#8), "Don't Say It's Over" (#19), "The Only One" (#29), and "Something Worthwhile" (#39). The first track was on the official British singles chart for a total of seven weeks. Swagger has also received mixed to positive critical reviews from various publications such as Allmusic and the music magazine Rock Hard.

== Production and recording ==
The album's release took place after a notable change in the band's line-up, with the group becoming a quartet made up of Mark Rankin (vocalist), Giuliano Gizzi (guitarist), Dante Gizzi (bassist), and Mark Kerr (drummer).

Swagger was produced and engineered by Chris Sheldon. He had previously worked with other English, Irish, and Scottish artists such as the singer-songwriters Hugh Cornwell, Gary Numan, and Roger Waters in the 1980s and 1990s. Nina Schultz took the photographs of the group from which the album's cover was picked.

== Reception and legacy ==
In 2005, the album was ranked No. 465 in the German-language book The 500 Greatest Rock & Metal Albums of All Time, which was published by the music magazine Rock Hard. An online article from the publication stated that each and every track on the album could potentially serve as a hit single. A supportive yet mixed review by music critic Tim DiGravina of Allmusic stated that the group "finds it hard to settle on any one style throughout" Swagger while noting the band's "large cult following". The critic also remarked on the similarity of style in some respects to Simple Minds, mentioning how Gun's then drummer, Mark Kerr, is the brother of that other group's vocalist, Jim Kerr.

Gun's version of "Word Up!" won the Best Cover trophy at the first international MTV Europe Music Awards, with that inaugural event being held on 24 November 1994 at Brandenburg Gate in Berlin, Germany. Said event was hosted by notable singer-songwriter Tom Jones. Gun edged out Wet Wet Wet's take on "Love Is All Around" and the Pet Shop Boys' cover of "Go West" among other songs.

Swagger reached the peak of No. 5 on the official British albums chart, and its release is viewed by many Gun fans as the pinnacle of the band's recording career.

== Track listing ==
1. "Stand in Line"
2. "Find My Way"
3. "Word Up!" (originally by Cameo)
4. "Don't Say It's Over"
5. "The Only One"
6. "Something Worthwhile"
7. "Seems Like I'm Losing You"
8. "Crying Over You"
9. "One Reason"
10. "Vicious Heart"

== Charts ==
Chart (1994)	Peak position
German Albums (Offizielle Top 100)	37
Dutch Albums (Album Top 100)	14
Swedish Albums (Sverigetopplistan)	17
Swiss Albums (Schweizer Hitparade)	32
UK Albums (OCC)	5

== Certifications ==
Region	Certification	Certified units/sales
United Kingdom (BPI)	Silver	60,000^{^}
^{^} Shipments figures based on certification alone.

== See also ==
- 1994 in music
- Chris Sheldon production discography
