= Robbie Crane =

American bassist

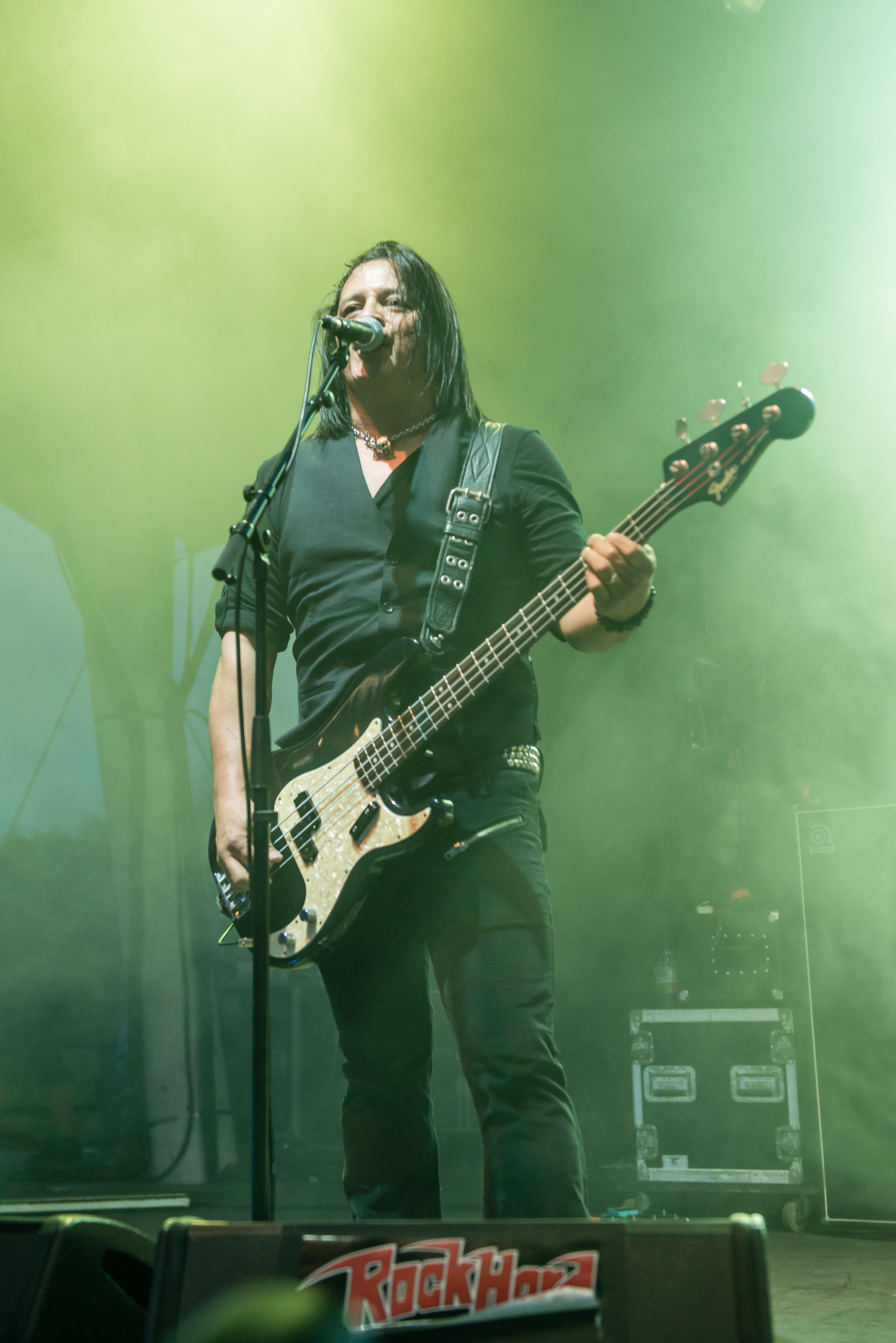
- Crane performing with Black Star Riders in 2015

Background information
- Born: January 5, 1969 (age 57), Orange County, California, US
- Genres: Rock, hard rock, heavy metal
- Instrument: Bass
- Years active: 1984–present

Robert Crane (born January 5, 1969) is an American musician who is the current bass guitarist of hard rock band Black Star Riders. He has also been a member of Ricky Warwick's band The Fighting Hearts. He was previously the bassist with the band Ratt.

== Early life and career ==
Crane moved to the Fairfax District of Hollywood, California, at the age of nine where he attended Bancroft Junior High and Fairfax high school. For his 14th birthday, his father bought him his first bass guitar from Fairfax Music School in Hollywood. Soon after, Crane and best friend Stuart Waldman were playing Hollywood clubs with their first band "Dream Suite" when they were only 16. Crane went on to work as bass technician for Bobby Dall of Poison from 1984–86.

As a bassist, Crane played in local L.A. bands Lancia, Hot Wheelz, NEWHAVEN and Monroe (Rick Monroe), and has toured with Vince Neil's (Mötley Crüe) solo band featuring Steve Stevens, Dave Marshall and Vik Foxx. He also played with Stephen Pearcy and Al Pitrelli in Vertex and toured and recorded with Ratt.

Crane joined Black Star Riders in 2014, replacing their original bassist Marco Mendoza. He has also worked with Vince Neil and Adler's Appetite. In 2021, he filled in as the touring bass player for Warrant whilst Jerry Dixon took a break, and has joined them on the road again in 2024 for a run of summer dates.

== Discography ==
=== With Vince Neil Band ===
- Carved in Stone (1995)

=== With Tuff ===
- Fist First (studio bassist) (1994)
- Religious Fix (studio bassist) (1995)

=== With Ratt ===
- Collage (1997)
- Ratt (1999)
- Infestation (2010)

=== With Adler's Appetite ===
- Adler's Appetite (2005)

=== With Saints of the Underground ===
- Love the Sin, Hate the Sinner (2008)

=== With Lynch Mob ===
- Sun Red Sun (2014)

=== With Black Star Riders ===
- The Killer Instinct (2015)
- Heavy Fire (2017)
- Another State of Grace (2019)
- Wrong Side of Paradise (2023)
