= Jam (album) =

Studio album by Little Angels
- Released: 1 February 1993
- Genre: Hard rock
- Length: 50:52
- Label: Polydor
- Producer: Andy Julian Paul, Ken Lomas

Little Angels chronology
Young Gods (1991)	Jam (1993)	A Little of the Past (1994)

Singles from Jam
- 1. "Too Much Too Young" Released: 2 November 1992; 2. "Womankind" Released: 4 January 1993; 3. "Soapbox" Released: 19 April 1993; 4. "Sail Away" Released: 20 September 1993

Jam is the third studio album by British rock band Little Angels. It peaked at number one in the UK Albums Chart in 1993. The album features the band's biggest hit, "Womankind", which peaked at no. 12 during a five-week stay in the UK charts. The single "Too Much Too Young" features Canadian singer Bryan Adams on backup vocals, and also became a significant hit for the group, reaching no. 22. "Soap Box" and "Sail Away" were lesser hits, peaking at no. 33 and no. 45 respectively.

== Reception ==
Professional ratings
Review scores
Source	Rating
AllMusic	3.5/5 stars

Allmusic gave the album a positive retrospective review, saying it "had all the ingredients of a major rock album -- powerful melodic guitar-based songs [...and] softer ballads".

== Track listing ==
No.	Title	Writer(s)	Length
1.	"The Way That I Live"	Toby Jepson, Jimmy Dickinson	4:59
2.	"Too Much Too Young"	Toby Jepson, Andy Paul	4:21
3.	"Splendid Isolation"	Toby Jepson	5:49
4.	"Soapbox"	Toby Jepson, Andy Paul	3:50
5.	"S.T.W."	Bruce John Dickinson	1:14
6.	"Don't Confuse Sex with Love"	Toby Jepson, Bruce John Dickinson	4:43
7.	"Womankind"	Toby Jepson	4:39
8.	"Eyes Wide Open"	Toby Jepson, Cliff Wade	3:38
9.	"The Colour of Love"	Toby Jepson, Bruce John Dickinson, Andy Paul	4:17
10.	"I Was Not Wrong"	Toby Jepson	4:00
11.	"Sail Away"	Toby Jepson, Jimmy Dickinson, Andy Paul	4:34
12.	"Tired of Waiting for You (So Tired)"	Ray Davies	4:27
13.	"S.T.W. (Reprise)"	Bruce John Dickinson	0:21

Japan Only Bonus tracks
No.	Title	Length
14.	"Hard Times"	4:05
15.	"I Get The Shakes"	4:16

== Personnel ==
Little Angels

- Toby Jepson – vocals, guitar
- Jimmy Dickinson - keyboards
- Mark Richardson – drums
- Mark Plunkett - bass
- Bruce John Dickinson - guitar

The Big Bad Horns

- "Big" Dave Kemp - saxophone
- Grant Kirkhope - trumpet
- Frank Mizen - trombone

Other

- Bryan Adams - backing vocals on "Too Much Too Young"
- Pete Thomas - drums
