= Little Angels =

English hard rock band

- Also known as: Zeus (1984–1985) Mr Thrud (1985–1987)
- Origin: Scarborough, England
- Genre: Glam metal
- Years active: 1984–1994, 2012–2013, 2026
- Label: Polydor
- Past members: Toby Jepson; Bruce Dickinson; Jimmy Dickinson; Mark Plunkett; Mark Richardson; Dave Hopper; Michael Lee

Little Angels are an English hard rock band predominantly active between the mid-1980s and mid-1990s. The band reformed to play the 2012 Download Festival. In February of 2026 they announced a UK tour scheduled for November, quickly adding extra dates due to ticket demand and then finally announcing that two further dates in Dublin and Belfast would begin the tour.

== History ==
=== 1984–1994: Early history and UK popularity ===
Little Angels formed in Scarborough, England in May 1984, under the name of Zeus and then to Mr Thrud in September 1985, settling on Little Angels during recording of the Too Posh to Mosh mini-album at Fairview Studios, Willerby, Hull in 1987. The founding members were Toby Jepson (vocalist), Mark Plunkett (bassist), Dave Hopper (drummer) and the brothers Bruce John and Jimmy Dickinson (guitarist and keyboardist respectively). Michael Lee joined the band to replace Hopper on 16 August 1988.

It was at this time that the band met Kevin Nixon who became their manager and label boss when he signed them to his York-based company Powerstation Records. Eventually out-growing the local scene the band signed to Polydor Records on 19 May 1988.

In 1991, the band released the album Young Gods that Q Magazine called "finely produced and well-arranged" while the single "Boneyard" charted in the UK. Lee was fired from Little Angels during the Young Gods tour in New York, after it was discovered he had auditioned for The Cult behind their backs. He went on to play the full Ceremony world tour. Lee was replaced by Mark Richardson, who filled in for him on several tour dates, before taking his place officially during the recording of the band's third album, Jam.

"The Big Bad Horns" ("Big" Dave Kemp on saxophone, Frank Mizen on trombone and Grant Kirkhope on trumpet) had become synonymous with the 'Angels' sound over the years, contributing to a large majority of their recorded output, and appearing live with the band more often than not. However, they were keen to remain independent from the band, so appearances on stage and record are credited to Little Angels and The Big Bad Horns.

Little Angels were successful in the UK with four best selling albums, including a number 1 in the UK Albums Chart in 1993 with Jam, plus 11 hit singles. They enjoyed a high profile in the UK, supporting bands including Van Halen and Bon Jovi.

Despite the seemingly disappointing record sales, they followed the announcement of their split by playing a sold-out six date UK tour, culminating in a performance at the Royal Albert Hall in 1994.

=== 1995–2011: After the break-up ===
After the demise of Little Angels, the Dickinson brothers formed b.l.o.w. with Richardson and the former No Sweat guitarist (turned vocalist) Dave Gooding. Jepson recorded and toured an album, Ignorance Is Bliss, under the moniker "Toby and the Whole Truth", which was intended to launch a solo career, but illness scuppered the tour and his immediate plans. He spent subsequent years away from the spotlight before a solo return in 2002.

When b.l.o.w. folded, Jimmy Dickinson became a member of the synth pop group Younger Younger 28's who had some success in Japan, and who released one album, Soap, on the V2 label. He gained his PhD in 2016 and Dr Jimmy is now the course leader for the Commercial Music course at BathSpa University, while working on developing new music projects.

Bruce John Dickinson went on to teach at, and manage, The Academy of Contemporary Music in Guildford, Surrey. He is now the managing director of the Brighton Institute of Modern Music which he set up with former Angels manager, Kevin Nixon.

Mark Richardson joined Skunk Anansie to replace their original drummer. When that band folded, he joined Feeder, following the suicide of their original drummer Jon Lee. He remained with the band until the end of 2008 when he re-joined Skunk Anansie for a greatest hits tour and album, plus new material.

Mark Plunkett (bass) turned his hand to artist management, and went on to manage firstly Boyzone, then Ronan Keating.

Michael Lee worked as a jobbing drummer, often playing with Robert Plant.

After a long while away from the spotlight, Jepson struck out on his own in 2001, touring the "Refresh EP" in early 2002 and onwards. Financial pressures put the brakes on this solo venture, and it looked as though he would once again withdraw from the stage. However, he made a return as a solo artist supporting Thunder on their 2006 UK tour and has – once again – performed solo since then. A spot as guest vocalist for Gun, at a charity gig in Glasgow promoted by rockradio, on 8 January 2008 resulted in him taking the role permanently. This was confirmed in April 2008.

Toby Jepson left GUN in June 2010 due to increased responsibility in other aspects of his musical involvement.

=== 2012–2013: Reunion ===
It was announced in January 2012 that the band were reforming to perform at that year's Download Festival. Their newly launched website for the occasion credits the meeting of the four founding members at Michael Lee's funeral as the catalyst for this re-union, stating "From the tragic death of their band-mate old friendships are rekindled." In an interview with EverythingRock, guitarist Bruce Dickinson stated that he doubted the reunion would be a permanent one, although his answer was not definitive.

On 7 June, Little Angels played at the 2012 Sweden Rock Festival. The reunion culminated in a 9-date UK tour in December 2012 with venues including Nottingham Rock City and O2 Shepherd's Bush Empire. The Glasgow date had to be moved to a larger venue due to "phenomenal demand". Support came from fellow British band Skin.

Drummer Richardson could not perform on the second leg of the tour due to commitments with Skunk Anansie, and was replaced by Dominic Greensmith (formerly of Reef). Similarly, Grant Kirkhope (trumpet) was unavailable. The reason given on stage by Jepson was that he was "living in California as a tramp".

Little Angels were booked to play the Isle of Wight Festival, supporting Bon Jovi, on 16 June 2013. On 9 May 2013 they issued a statement to say that this, in conjunction with warm up shows in Cardiff and Cambridge, would be the end of their reunion activities together. Drummer Richardson joined the band for these final three dates, but not trumpeter Grant Kirkhope.

=== 2026 Reunion ===
In January 2026, Jepson's personal and Little Angels’ own social accounts and website were updated to announce imminent tour dates under the title ‘Big, Bad and Back’ teasing a further re-union to be announced on 9 February 2026.

On 9 February 2026, the announcement was made that Little Angels were again reuniting the Jam-era line-up of Jepson, Plunkett, Richardson & the Dickinson brothers for the Big Bad & Back Tour scheduled for November 2026, with Luke Morley of Thunder as support.

The official Little Angels website currently shows dates from the 9th November 2026, starting in Dublin, and finishing in London on the 28th and 29th.

== Discography ==
=== Studio albums ===
- Don't Prey for Me (1989)
- Young Gods (1991) UK No. 17
- Jam (1993) UK No. 1
- Too Posh to Mosh, Too Good to Last! (1994) UK No. 18

=== Mini albums ===
- Too Posh to Mosh (1987)

=== Live albums ===
- Live at Hammersmith Odeon EP (1991)
- Access All Areas (2015)

=== Compilation albums ===
- A Little of the Past (1994) UK No. 20

=== Extended plays ===
- '87 (1987)
- Big Bad EP (1989) UK No. 74
- Big Bad World (Japan only) (1989)
- Big Bad & Back (2026)

=== Singles ===
- "90 in the Shade" (1988) UK No. 101
- "Do You Wanna Riot" (1989) UK No. 91
- "Don't Pray For Me" (1989) UK No. 93
- "Kicking up Dust" (1990) UK No. 46
- "Radical Your Lover" (1990) UK No. 34
- "She's a Little Angel" (1990) UK No. 21
- "Boneyard" (1991) UK No. 33
- "Product of the Working Class" (1991) UK No. 40
- "Young Gods" (1991) UK No. 34
- "I Ain't Gonna Cry" (1991) UK No. 26
- "First Cut Is the Deepest" (Germany only)(1992)
- "Too Much Too Young" (1992) UK No. 22
- "Womankind" (1993) UK No. 12; Ire. No. 29
- "Soapbox" (1993) UK No. 33
- "Sail Away" (1993) UK No. 45
- "Ten Miles High" (1994) UK No. 18
- "All Roads Lead to You" (1994)
