= The Killer Instinct =

Studio album by Black Star Riders
- Released: February 20, 2015
- Recorded: September 2014; Nashville, Tennessee, U.S.
- Genre: Hard rock
- Label: Nuclear Blast
- Producer: Nick Raskulinecz

Black Star Riders chronology
All Hell Breaks Loose (2013)	The Killer Instinct (2015)	Heavy Fire (2017)

Singles from The Killer Instinct
- 1. "The Killer Instinct" Released: December 16, 2014; 2. "Finest Hour" Released: February 17, 2015; 3. "Charlie I Gotta Go" Released: September 2015; 4. "Soldierstown" Released: November 27, 2015

Professional ratings
Review scores
Source	Rating
Exclaim!	8/10
Classic Rock	9/10

The Killer Instinct is the second studio album by hard rock band Black Star Riders, released on February 20, 2015. Black Star Riders evolved from the touring version of Thin Lizzy, assembled by guitarist Scott Gorham after the death of Thin Lizzy's leader Phil Lynott. The band's first album, All Hell Breaks Loose, was released in 2013.

== Recording ==
Recording for the band's follow-up to All Hell Breaks Loose was first announced during late 2013, and on 27 January 2014, it was announced the band's second album would be recorded in Dublin in October, and would be produced by Def Leppard vocalist Joe Elliott. Elliott had previously worked on vocalist Ricky Warwick's solo albums, and also with Scott Gorham on archival Thin Lizzy releases. However, Elliott pulled out of the project in August 2014 due to conflicts with Def Leppard's schedule. He was quickly replaced by Nick Raskulinecz, and recording took place in Nashville, Tennessee in September.

The Killer Instinct is the first Black Star Riders album to feature former Ratt and Lynch Mob bass guitarist Robbie Crane, who replaced founder member Marco Mendoza in June 2014.

When the album title was announced on 21 November 2014, Warwick explained the name: "Life's not fair. Never has been, never will be. Sometimes you have to live with a killer instinct just to survive in the pursuit of happiness. Nobody can do for you what you should be doing for yourself." Guitarist Damon Johnson praised the album's producer Nick Raskulinecz, stating, "He patiently walked through the full song list with the entire band, and made sure we focused on the material to best represent Black Star Riders in 2015."

=== Singles ===
The first single from the album was the title track, which received its first airplay on 15 December 2014, on Ken Bruce's mid-morning show on BBC Radio 2 in the UK. On the same day, a lyric video was released, and the single was released the following day.

The follow-up single was "Finest Hour", which was again given its first UK radio airplay by Ken Bruce on BBC Radio 2, and which subsequently became the station's "Record of the Week".

== Track listing ==
No.	Title	Writer(s)	Length
1.	"The Killer Instinct"	Ricky Warwick, Damon Johnson	3:32
2.	"Bullet Blues"	Warwick, Johnson	4:54
3.	"Finest Hour"	Warwick, Johnson	3:56
4.	"Soldierstown"	Warwick, Sam Robinson, Scott Gorham, Johnson	4:50
5.	"Charlie I Gotta Go"	Warwick, Johnson	4:14
6.	"Blindsided"	Warwick, Johnson	6:00
7.	"Through the Motions"	Warwick, Johnson	3:47
8.	"Sex, Guns & Gasoline"	Warwick, Gorham, Johnson	4:00
9.	"Turn in Your Arms"	Warwick, Gorham, Johnson	3:50
10.	"You Little Liar"	Warwick, Johnson	7:08

=== Bonus tracks ===
No.	Title	Writer(s)	Length
1.	"Gabrielle"	Warwick, Johnson	3:22
2.	"The Reckoning Day"	Warwick, Johnson	3:38
3.	"The Killer Instinct" (acoustic)	Warwick, Johnson	3:19
4.	"Blindsided" (acoustic)	Warwick, Johnson	5:15
5.	"Charlie I Gotta Go" (acoustic)	Warwick, Johnson	4:06
6.	"Finest Hour" (acoustic)	Warwick, Johnson	3:44

== Personnel ==
- Ricky Warwick – vocals, guitar
- Scott Gorham – lead guitar, rhythm guitar
- Damon Johnson – lead guitar, rhythm guitar, lap steel guitar on "Finest Hour" and "The Reckoning Day"
- Robbie Crane – bass guitar
- Jimmy DeGrasso – drums, percussion

with

- Nick Raskulinecz – mellotron and Taurus pedals on "Blindsided" and "You Little Liar"
- Mark Gemini Thwaite – strings on "Blindsided" (acoustic)
- Recorded at Rock Falcon Studio, Franklin, Tennessee
- Engineered by Nathan Yarborough; 2nd engineer: John Albritton
- Mixed by Jay Ruston at TRS West, Sherman Oaks, California
- Assistant mixer: James Ingram
- Mastered by Paul Logus for PLX Mastering, Yonkers, New York
- Acoustic bonus tracks produced by Damon Johnson and Ricky Warwick
- Acoustic bonus tracks engineered and mixed by Mark Gemini Thwaite

== Charts ==
Chart (2015)	Peak position
Belgian Albums (Ultratop Wallonia)	98
Belgian Albums (Ultratop Flanders)	172
French Albums (SNEP)	126
German Albums (Offizielle Top 100)	23
Irish Albums (IRMA)	29
Scottish Albums (OCC)	11
Swedish Albums (Sverigetopplistan)	29
Swiss Albums (Schweizer Hitparade)	39
UK Albums (OCC)	13
UK Independent Albums (OCC)	2
UK Rock & Metal Albums (OCC)	2
