= Toby Jepson =

English guitarist, singer and songwriter

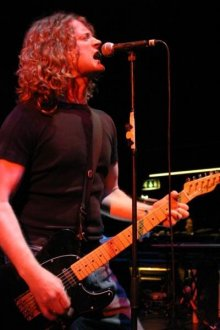

Background information
- Born: Toby Jepson
- Origin: Scarborough, England,
- Genre: Hard rock
- Occupations: Musician, singer-songwriter, guitarist, producer
- Instruments: Vocals, guitar, bass guitar, percussion, keyboard, piano, harmonica
- Years active: 1984–present
- Label: Townsend Reconds
- Website: tobyjepsonofficial.com

Toby Jepson is a singer and songwriter, and is the lead vocalist and guitarist of British rock band Wayward Sons. He was formerly the lead vocalist and guitarist of Little Angels between 1984 and 1994. Between 2008 and 2015, he was the lead singer with Scottish rock band Gun.

== Career ==
=== Early career and Little Angels ===
Jepson formed Mr Thrud with his school friend Mark Plunkett in Scarborough, and the band went on to become very popular in their local area. Eventually breaking out and achieving national success, Mr Thrud became Little Angels and went on to release three albums and tour the UK throughout the early 1990s.

The band had twelve Top 40 hit singles, including "Too Much, Too Young" and "Womankind" in 1993, and a number one album Jam in 1993. They toured with Bon Jovi, Bryan Adams and Van Halen, and performed their own headlining tours taking in venues such as Hammersmith Apollo and The Royal Albert Hall. They were arguably one of the most successful and popular British bands of their time.

=== Solo career and acting ===
When the band split (somewhat acrimoniously) in 1994, Jepson continued to write and produce music. His solo debut album was released in 1995 under the moniker "Toby & The Whole Truth". Ignorance Is Bliss showed a different side to his songwriting, and he embarked on a tour to support it. This tour was cut short due to illness that developed into pneumonia, and this affected sales of the album and his profile, which suffered as a result.

Jepson spent a long while out of the spotlight, during which time he moved to Bristol. He earned a living working as a supporting actor on various productions (including Gladiator, Sleepy Hollow, The Visitors, Angela's Ashes, Highlander: Endgame and Steven Spielberg's Band of Brothers amongst others) and busying himself with various projects – including writing and recording, although he was not releasing records at the time.

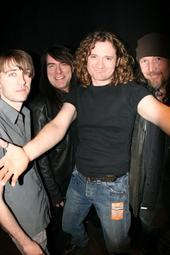

He returned to the public eye in late 2001 and announced a short club tour with a new band (but using his own name). He toured the UK through the start of 2002, and released the Refresh EP over the Internet and at gigs to showcase the new material he had been working on. A re-issue of Ignorance Is Bliss was also made available at this time. As a premium membership feature of his website, he launched the "MP3 Club" in which subscribers would receive exclusive recordings delivered straight to their inbox via email every month.

Jepson and his band continued writing and recording when they got off the road, and then toured again in 2002–2003. Around this time work commenced on Twisted Rhapsodies, a double-disc collection of live material, demos and rare recordings. Before its release, however, Jepson announced over his website that it was likely that this was to be his final output, as the venture was rapidly becoming unfeasible financially.

In November 2005, Jepson surfaced again to tour with Thunder. He toured twice in the UK during 2006: the first tour supporting Thunder, and the second headlining during September. This new tour premiered new songs to his fanbase.

In March 2007, Jepson released the first of three EPs titled "Guitar, Bass and Drums", and immediately began touring to promote them. In addition to headlining his own shows, he was a special guest to former Deep Purple bassist and vocalist Glenn Hughes, at a date in Shepherd's Bush, London. "EP 2" was released in September 2007. More tour dates followed and the new material was performed live.

=== Fastway, Gun and production career ===
In May 2007, Jepson was invited to be the lead singer of the reformed Fastway, led by former Motörhead guitarist "Fast" Eddie Clarke, and featuring British music agent Steve Strange on drums and former Mama's Boys bass player John McManus. This took Jepson on a tour of some of Europe's largest festival dates including Download and as part of the 'Hyde Park Calling' series of events. The band reconvened in 2010 to record their first album for 15 years. Jepson sang lead vocals, played bass, and produced Eat Dog Eat, which was released in 2011.

January 2008 saw Jepson perform solo and as a guest vocalist for Gun, at a charity gig in Glasgow, promoted by Rockradio. During the Gun set, Jepson appeared on stage wearing a kilt, and in April 2008 he was announced as their full-time singer. In November 2009, Gun released an EP entitled Popkiller, which was a very different departure to Jepson's solo work. In 2010 Jepson continued to tour with Gun until 28 June, when he announced he was stepping down as Gun's singer due to other commitments. The statement was reproduced on the official GUN website the same day with an additional statement by Jools and Dante Gizzi confirming Jepson's departure.

In addition to work as a singer-songwriter, Jepson has begun a career as a music producer. In 2008 he was introduced to Macclesfield rock act The Virginmarys, and went on to produce their debut mini album Cast the First Stone. This relationship has since developed and Jepson produced the band's first full album, which was set to be released in 2013. Jepson owns and operates a small studio facility in his home town of Scarborough called The Strangeplace, where the majority of his productions begin, although the Chapel Studios in Louth has become a base for the major recording aspects.

In late 2010, Jepson announced he was to co-produce Saxon with singer Biff Byford. Work began once again in Chapel Studios in December 2010 and was completed in Brighton and Los Angeles, where the American mix engineer Mike Plotnikoff mixed the album in February 2011. The album, Call To Arms, was released worldwide in June 2011, prompting many reviews to state the record as a return to form for the band.

In 2010 the final EP in the 'guitar, bass and drums' trilogy was completed by Jepson and released on 6 December through Townsend Records. Jepson then went on tour with UK band SKIN where the EP was on sale. Unusually for an EP, the collection contained 11 original songs (two of which had been available as free downloads through his official website – "The Chosen One" and "Hurts"). The release marked the end to a three-year wait by the fans. Jepson apologised to fans via his site for the wait putting it down to demand for his services elsewhere.

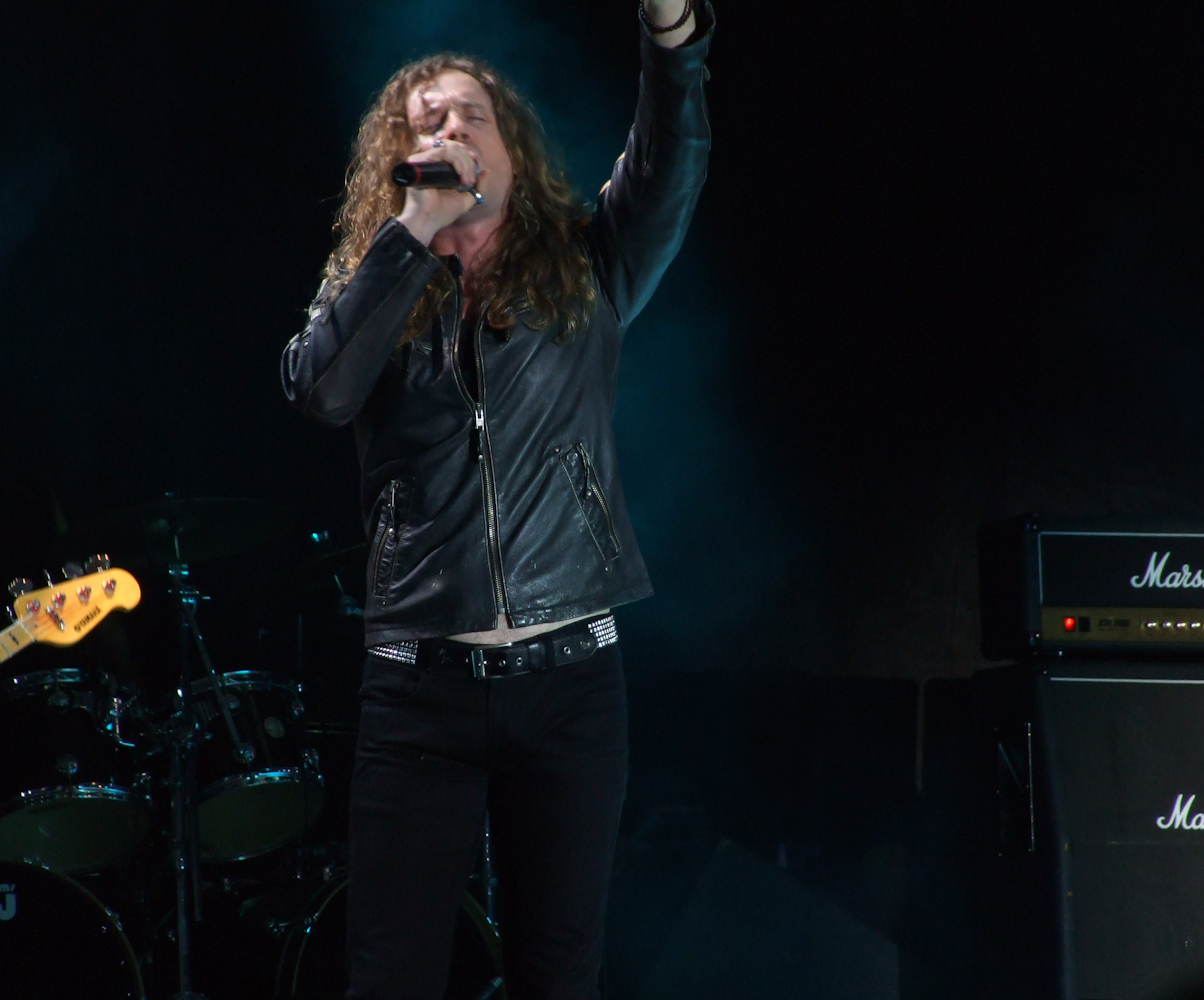
Toby Jepson performing with the tribute formation DIO Disciples at Kavarna Rock Fest 2012.

It was around this time also that Jepson met Wendy Dio at the Classic Rock Award ceremony in London and joined many who wished to express sympathy and condolences for the untimely death of her husband Ronnie James Dio, of whom he had been a lifelong fan. Around New Year he was approached by Niji Entertainment, Wendy Dio's company and the base for all of RJD's operations, through his long-time agent and close friend, Steve Strange, to be one of two singers who would front a band consisting of Ronnie James Dio's band members, Craig Goldy, Simon Wright, Scott Warren, one time Megadeth bass player James Lomenzo and metal singer Tim 'Ripper' Owens. It was to be a celebration of Dio's career after his death the year before from cancer. The project was named Dio's Disciples and was allied to a foundation set up to raise money and awareness for cancer sufferers. The foundation was called 'Stand up and Shout' after a song on Ronnie James Dio's first solo record, Holy Diver. After rehearsals in Los Angeles, the project's live début was in Moscow as part of a European wide tour that included performances at Finnish festival 'Sauna open air', UK's Download and Belgium Festival 'Graspop' as well as dates in clubs. The tour also featured The Rods – which features Dave 'Rock' Feinstein, RJD's cousin and one time 'ELF' member as well as the Canadian heavy metal outfit Anvil in support. The Spanish dates also featured Doro Pesch as a replacement vocalist for Ripper Owens due to his returning to the US to attend his eldest daughter's wedding. The tour finished on 3 July 2011 with a US, South American and Japanese tours planned for later in the year.

Upon his return from the tour, Jepson immediately went back into production work with the Virginmarys and Chrome Molly, another band whom he had begun producing just prior to setting off on tour with Dio.

Little Angels reformed to play Download 2012, with the full Jam line-up performing. Two tours followed, before the band bowed out again, playing their final show at The Isle Of Wight festival in 2013.

=== Wayward Sons and further solo activity ===
In 2017, Jepson returned on the live circuit with his new band, Wayward Sons. Their debut album Ghosts Of Yet To Come was released on Frontiers Records on 15 September 2017. This was followed in 2019 by a second album, The Truth Ain't What It Used to Be, and a third, Even Up the Score, in 2021. An EP, "Score Settled", was released in 2022.

In 2018, he released a live acoustic CD recorded on his 2013 Raising My Own Hell tour, and featuring a collection of solo tracks and Little Angels songs. The CD was initially limited to 100 copies, and was only available at a handful of gigs but the demand was so great that it was later released online.

During the Covid-19 pandemic, Jepson hosted an almost weekly show from his kitchen on Facebook, playing an assortment of acoustic Little Angels and solo songs. These were recorded and released as CDs via his website.

Since January 2023, Jepson has presented a two-hour radio show on Planet Rock on Sundays (repeated on Thursdays).

== Discography ==
=== Mr. Thrud ===
- "Mr. Thrud" (EP) (1986)

=== Little Angels ===
- "87" (EP) (1987)
- Too Posh to Mosh (1988)
- Don't Prey for Me (1989)
- "Big Bad EP" (EP) (1991) – UK No. 74
- Young Gods (1991) – UK No. 17
- Jam (1993) – UK No. 1
- Little of the Past (1994) – UK No. 20
- Too Posh to Mosh, Too Good to Last! (1994) – UK No. 18
- "Big Bad & Back" (EP) (2026)

=== Toby and the Whole Truth ===
- Ignorance Is Bliss (1995)
- Look Out (2025)

=== Fastway ===
- Eat Dog Eat (2011)

=== Solo ===
- Refresh (EP) (2001)
- MP3 Club (internet only subscription releases) (2003)
- Twisted Rhapsodies (2003)
- Guitar, Bass and Drums EP1 (2007)
- Guitar, Bass and Drums EP2 (2007)
- Guitar, Bass and Drums EP3 (2011)
- Raising My Own Hell (EP) (2013)
- Live Acoustic (2018)
- Kitchen Up Busk (The 2020 Lockdown Sessions) (compilation) (2020)
- Viewfinder (compilation) (2021)
- Digital Busker – Return to the Kitchen (compilation) (2021)
- Sticks and Stones (2022)
- Little Angels Live Rarities (2024)
- Live Studio Acoustic Rarities Volume One (2024)
- Little Angels Rarities 2 (2024)
- Flavours (compilation) (2025)

=== Gun ===
- Popkiller (EP) (2009)

=== Wayward Sons ===
- Ghosts Of Yet To Come (2017) – UK No. 71
- The Truth Ain't What It Used To Be (2019) – UK No. 69
- Even Up The Score (2021) – UK No. 98
- "Score Settled" (EP) (2022)
