= All Hell Breaks Loose (Black Star Riders album) =

Studio album by Black Star Riders
- Released: May 21, 2013
- Recorded: January 8–20, 2013; Los Angeles, California, U.S.
- Genre: Hard rock
- Length: 45:54
- Label: Nuclear Blast
- Producer: Kevin Shirley

Black Star Riders chronology
All Hell Breaks Loose (2013)	The Killer Instinct (2015)

Singles from All Hell Breaks Loose
- 1. "Bound for Glory" Released: March 24, 2013; 2. "Hey Judas" Released: June 13, 2013 (promo only); 3. "Kingdom of the Lost" Released: November 12, 2013 (promo only)

All Hell Breaks Loose is the debut studio album by hard rock band Black Star Riders, released in May 2013. Black Star Riders evolved from the touring version of Thin Lizzy, assembled by guitarist Scott Gorham after the death of Thin Lizzy's leader Phil Lynott.

== Background ==
Black Star Riders formed in December 2012, when members of the most recent line-up of Thin Lizzy decided to record new material, but chose not to release it under the Thin Lizzy name. In May 2010, Gorham announced the latest incarnation of the group, which had toured sporadically with various line-ups since 1996, after Lynott died in 1986. As the band toured throughout 2011 and 2012, they composed new material for possible release as a Thin Lizzy studio album, and demos were recorded in June 2012.

In October 2012, it was announced that the new material would not be recorded under the Thin Lizzy name, and that a new band name would be used for the new songs. According to Gorham, this was "out of respect to Phil Lynott and the legacy he created", though he confirmed that the new material would feature the classic Thin Lizzy sound. He later confirmed that the decision was taken by himself and Thin Lizzy drummer Brian Downey, with the support of the other members of the band, and that the Thin Lizzy estate (controlled by Lynott's widow Caroline) had also been uncomfortable about new Thin Lizzy studio recordings. Vocalist Ricky Warwick acknowledged that a portion of Thin Lizzy fans were also against the idea of Thin Lizzy studio recordings without Lynott.

== Recording ==
With a line-up consisting of Gorham, Warwick, other Thin Lizzy touring members Damon Johnson (lead guitar) and Marco Mendoza (bass guitar), and experienced drummer Jimmy DeGrasso, Black Star Riders recorded their debut album during January 2013 with producer Kevin Shirley. Fifteen songs were recorded, composed mostly by Johnson with Warwick providing the lyrics, with input from Gorham, Mendoza and Thin Lizzy keyboard player Darren Wharton. Twelve tracks were ultimately used for the album, including one bonus track for a special edition CD. This special edition CD also includes a DVD outlining the process of making the album. Recording was completed on 20 January, and the photography for the album and promotional material was also completed at that time, with American music photographer Robert John. Shirley mixed the album in February 2013.

Warwick confirmed that the recording process was very simple, with very few overdubs (mostly harmony guitars and backing vocals), minimal use of Pro Tools and no use of Auto-Tune. The lead vocals were recorded along with the band using a 'live-in-the-studio' method.

Regarding the title of the album, Warwick revealed: "I was watching a documentary about World War II bombers and saw the name painted on the side of one of the aircraft. The name just resonated with me and it seem to encapsulate the turmoil that we, as a society, are currently experiencing. The past few years have been such a wild ride and now with the release of the album, it sounded like a bad-ass album title that summed up what Black Star Riders is all about." The cover art features a painting of a girl by Gil Elvgren.

=== "Bound for Glory" ===
The first single was "Bound for Glory", which received its first airplay on 21 March, on Ken Bruce's mid-morning show on BBC Radio 2 in the UK. The single was released on 24 March, with Gorham stating: "When it came time to pick one of these songs as a single, we had a really hard time. There are so many really great tracks here and everyone had their favourites. But in the end, we all agreed that "Bound for Glory" is the perfect choice and represents what Black Star Riders is all about." Warwick added that Gorham was initially not keen on the song as he thought it sounded too much like Thin Lizzy, and that it had not been demoed with the full band. During recording, Gorham and Johnson came up with the harmony guitar line that features in the song. He also explained that the character 'Johnny Wong' in the song was named after the proprietor of a Chinese restaurant in Plymouth visited by Gorham and Mendoza. The girl named 'Mary' in the second verse was based upon an ex-girlfriend of Warwick's (actually named 'Mandy'), who had a poster of Phil Lynott on her wall. Warwick initially intended the line "Elvis in the backroom and Jesus on the wall" to mention Lynott, but Gorham asked him to change it.

== Reception ==
Professional ratings
Review scores
Source	Rating
AllMusic	3.5/5 stars
The Guardian	3/5 stars
New Noise Magazine	4.5/5 stars
Sputnikmusic	3.5/5

The album met mostly positive reviews, with AllMusic critic Thom Jurek praising its "classic hard rock attack" and the "trademark twin guitar sound of" Thin Lizzy. He cited it as an album filled "naturally with creativity, heft, and inspiration". New Noise Magazine critic Brandon Ringo noted that the name change suited the band, however "[it's] so good, it doesn’t matter what they call it, it’s a fantastic rock n’ roll record".

Sputnikmusic and The Guardian's Michael Hann were less enthusiastic in their reviews, with the former claiming it "isn't fantastic" and sounds "generic" in places, and the latter stating the songs were "not always scaling the heights".

Scott Gorham won the Riff Lord Award at the 2013 Metal Hammer Golden Gods Awards ceremony for his work on the album.

== Track listing ==
No.	Title	Writer(s)	Length
1.	"All Hell Breaks Loose"	Ricky Warwick, Damon Johnson, Scott Gorham, Marco Mendoza, Darren Wharton	4:15
2.	"Bound for Glory"	Warwick, Johnson	4:08
3.	"Kingdom of the Lost"	Warwick, Johnson	4:43
4.	"Bloodshot"	Gorham, Warwick, Johnson	4:02
5.	"Kissin' the Ground"	Warwick, Johnson, Marti Frederiksen	3:06
6.	"Hey Judas"	Warwick, Johnson, Gorham	4:11
7.	"Hoodoo Voodoo"	Warwick, Johnson	4:15
8.	"Valley of the Stones"	Warwick, Johnson, Gorham	4:15
9.	"Someday Salvation"	Warwick, Johnson	3:05
10.	"Before the War"	Warwick, Johnson	3:39
11.	"Blues Ain't So Bad"	Gorham, Warwick, Johnson, Mendoza, Wharton	6:15
Total length:			45:54

Special edition digipak bonus track
No.	Title	Writer(s)	Length
12.	"Right to Be Wrong"	Warwick, Johnson, Gorham	3:35

== Personnel ==
- Ricky Warwick – vocals, guitar
- Scott Gorham – lead guitar, rhythm guitar
- Damon Johnson – lead guitar, rhythm guitar
- Marco Mendoza – bass guitar
- Jimmy DeGrasso – drums, percussion

== Charts ==
Chart (2013)	Peak position
Belgian Albums (Ultratop Wallonia)	107
Finnish Albums (Suomen virallinen lista)	38
French Albums (SNEP)	182
German Albums (Offizielle Top 100)	29
Irish Albums (IRMA)	64
Irish Indie Albums Chart	7
Scottish Albums (OCC)	17
Swedish Albums (Sverigetopplistan)	15
Swiss Albums (Schweizer Hitparade)	63
UK Albums (OCC)	25
UK Independent Albums (OCC)	6
UK Rock & Metal Albums (OCC)	2
US Hard Rock Chart	15
