= Scott Gorham =

American guitarist (born 1951)

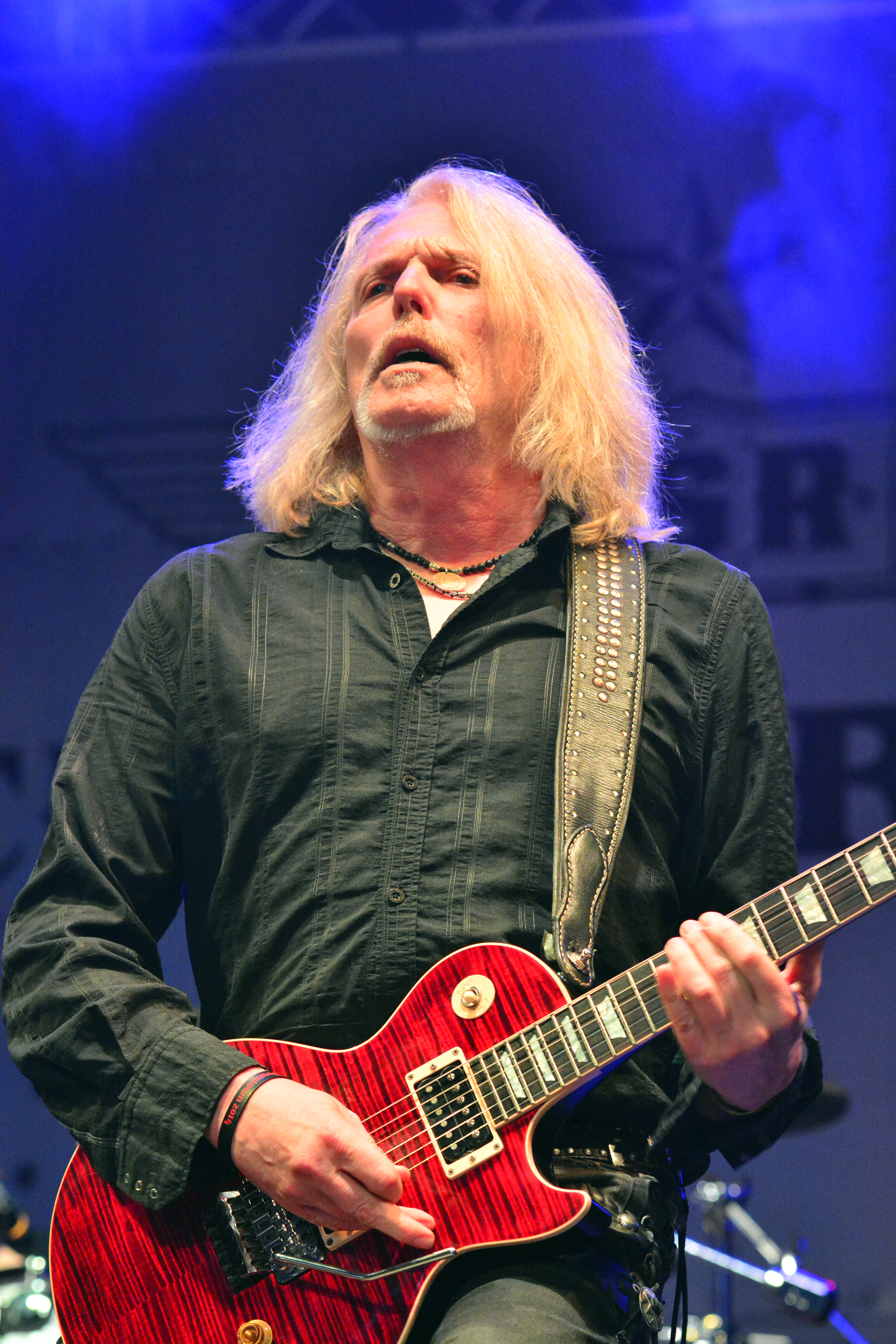
- Gorham performing with Black Star Riders in 2014

Background information
- Born: William Scott Gorham; March 17, 1951 (age 75); Glendale, California, US
- Genres: Rock; blues rock; hard rock; heavy metal; progressive rock
- Occupations: Musician, songwriter
- Instrument: Guitar
- Years active: 1974–present
- Website: scottgorhamworld.com

William Scott Gorham (born March 17, 1951) is an American guitarist and songwriter who is one of the "twin lead guitarists" for the Irish rock band Thin Lizzy. Although not a founding member of Thin Lizzy, he served as a continuous member after passing an audition in 1974, joining the band at a time when its future was in doubt following the departures of original guitarist Eric Bell and his brief replacement Gary Moore. Gorham remained with Thin Lizzy until the band's breakup in 1983. He and guitarist Brian Robertson, both hired at the same time, marked the beginning of the band's most critically successful period, and together developed Thin Lizzy's twin lead guitar style while contributing dual backing vocals as well. Gorham is the band member with the longest membership after founders Brian Downey (drummer) and frontman and bass guitarist, Phil Lynott.

Since 1996, Gorham has continued to perform with Thin Lizzy on guitar and backing vocals, having assembled various lineups after the death of band leader Lynott in 1986. In 2012, Gorham co-founded the Thin Lizzy spin-off band Black Star Riders to showcase new material. He left Black Star Riders in 2021 in order to concentrate on Thin Lizzy.

== Career ==
=== Early years ===
Scott Gorham was born in Glendale, California and began his musical career at 13, learning to play the bass guitar, and joining several local teenage bands including The Jesters, Mudd and The Ilford Subway, the latter recording a single, "The 3rd Prophecy" in October 1967. He switched instruments when a close friend of his, a guitarist in his then-current band, 18-year-old Steve Schrage, died in a motorcycle crash in Glendale in 1968. Gorham's friend (and bandmate in a number of bands) Bob Siebenberg later recalled, "That incident devastated Scott. He decided the very day that he heard about the accident to take this kid's place, to try to get to where this kid would have eventually gotten to. Scott stunned everybody by dropping the bass, which he was very proficient at, and switching to guitar." Gorham subsequently joined Redeye in 1969 with Siebenberg, and the two joined Benbecula in 1970 before Siebenberg moved to England in 1971.

In 1973 Siebenberg, by then also Gorham's brother-in-law and drummer with Supertramp, convinced Gorham to join him in England, with hope of playing in the same outfit. Gorham was unable to find work with his friend, so he started playing with a number of bands in pubs around London, before starting his own band, Fast Buck. In 1974 a musician acquaintance, Ruan O'Lochlainn, suggested he attend auditions being held by Phil Lynott, Thin Lizzy's primary songwriter, and one of the founders of the band. Thin Lizzy were at the time in a state of flux and reorganization, and while the drummer and bassist remained, two new guitarists were wanted. Brian Robertson, at age seventeen, had already been chosen before Gorham auditioned and joined. The two guitarists shared lead guitar roles, and harmonized with one another, as well as alternately playing rhythm and lead, which led to Thin Lizzy having what was considered a unique sound.

=== Thin Lizzy ===
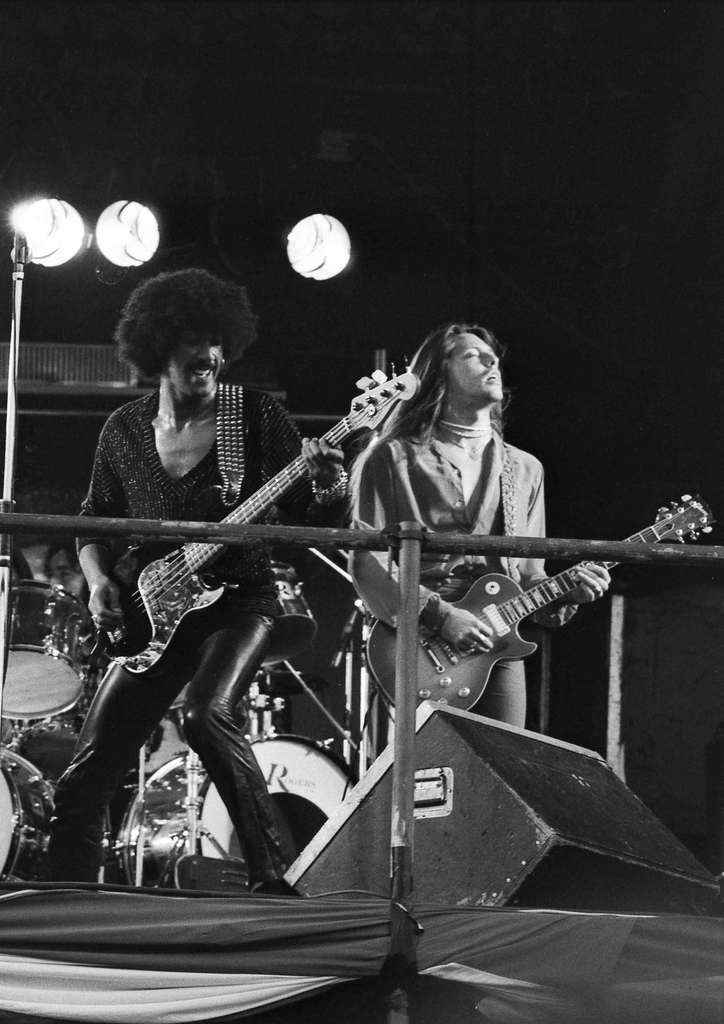
L to R: Phil Lynott with Gorham in a 1978 performance with Thin Lizzy at Pinkpop Festival, The Netherlands

Upon joining Thin Lizzy, Gorham took on a songwriting role as well as that of a guitarist. "She Knows", the opening track of his first album with the band, Nightlife, began a long songwriting partnership with Lynott. They co-wrote two songs for Gorham's next album with the band, Fighting, and Gorham contributed one of his own, "Ballad of a Hard Man". This was to be the only Thin Lizzy song that was credited solely to Gorham. He also co-wrote "Warriors" and "Emerald" on Jailbreak, Lizzy's breakthrough album. Gorham's role in the band remained consistent until the recording of 1977's Bad Reputation album, for which Brian Robertson was largely absent. Gorham played all the lead guitar parts for the majority of the songs, including the hit single "Dancing in the Moonlight (It's Caught Me in Its Spotlight)", though he convinced Lynott to bring back Robertson and have him record the solos for the songs "Killer Without a Cause" and "Opium Trail".

When Gary Moore returned to the band, replacing Robertson in 1979 for the album Black Rose: A Rock Legend, Gorham took the new arrival as an impetus to improve his own playing, as he did with all his subsequent guitar partners in the band. At the same time however, drug use became more prevalent within the band, and Gorham and Lynott both became addicted to heroin. Gorham was unable to rid himself of the habit until 1985, after the band had split up. 1980 introduced another co-lead guitarist in Snowy White, culminating in the album Chinatown for which Gorham co-wrote two songs. His songwriting contributions increased on the band's next effort, as he was credited with co-writing almost half the songs on the 1981 album Renegade. Thin Lizzy split up in 1983 after finishing a tour in support of Thunder and Lightning.

=== The Western Front, Phenomena II and 21 Guns ===
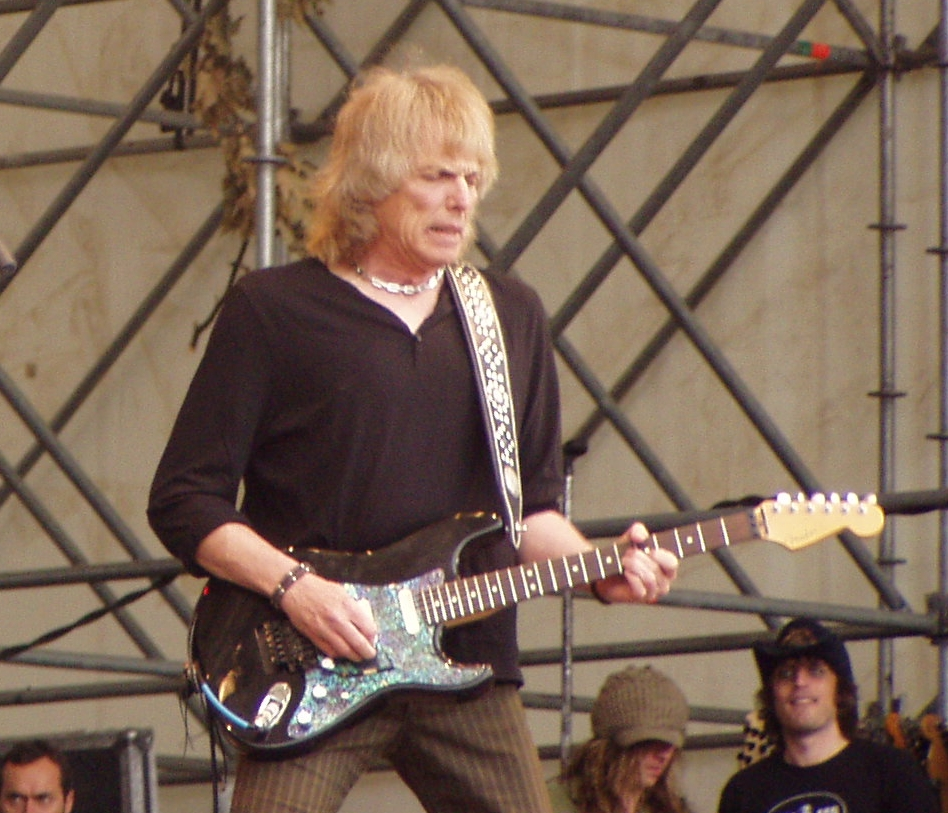
Gorham with Thin Lizzy; Monsters of Rock Festival, Milan, Italy 2007

After Thin Lizzy broke up, Gorham recorded an album as a member of The Western Front in 1983–84, with Marty Walsh, Darrell Verdusco, Richard "Moon" Calhoun, Derek Bergmann and Dennis O'Donnell. The album, Eureka, was unreleased at the time and the band members went their separate ways, but the twelve-track album was finally be released on July 10, 2026.

Gorham subsequently joined Phenomena II, where he met Leif Johansen (ex-A-ha and Far Corporation) with whom he formed 21 Guns, releasing three albums. He has also played with Asia, the Rollins Band, and Supertramp. Gorham's sister Vicki married Supertramp's drummer Bob Siebenberg.

In 1997, he played guest guitars on the track "I'm Alive" from Psycho Motel's album, Welcome to the World.

=== Reformation of Thin Lizzy ===
Gorham reformed Thin Lizzy in 1996 with former band members, playing various tours in tribute to founding singer, songwriter, and bassist Phil Lynott, who died in 1986. The tour was named the 20/20 tour – 20 dates for 20 years. After John Sykes' departure in 2009, Brian Downey, Darren Wharton, and Marco Mendoza rejoined the band. New to the lineup were Def Leppard guitarist Vivian Campbell and former The Almighty vocalist Ricky Warwick. After months of pre-production and two weeks of rehearsals in Los Angeles in November 2010, this version of Thin Lizzy started a world tour in January 2011. Touring continued throughout the year and into 2012, with Campbell eventually being replaced permanently by Damon Johnson.

To coincide with the fortieth anniversary of the release of the Thin Lizzy album Jailbreak, there was a selection of special Thin Lizzy shows in 2016–17. The band consisted of Gorham, Ricky Warwick, Damon Johnson, Darren Wharton, Scott Travis and Tom Hamilton.

=== Black Star Riders ===
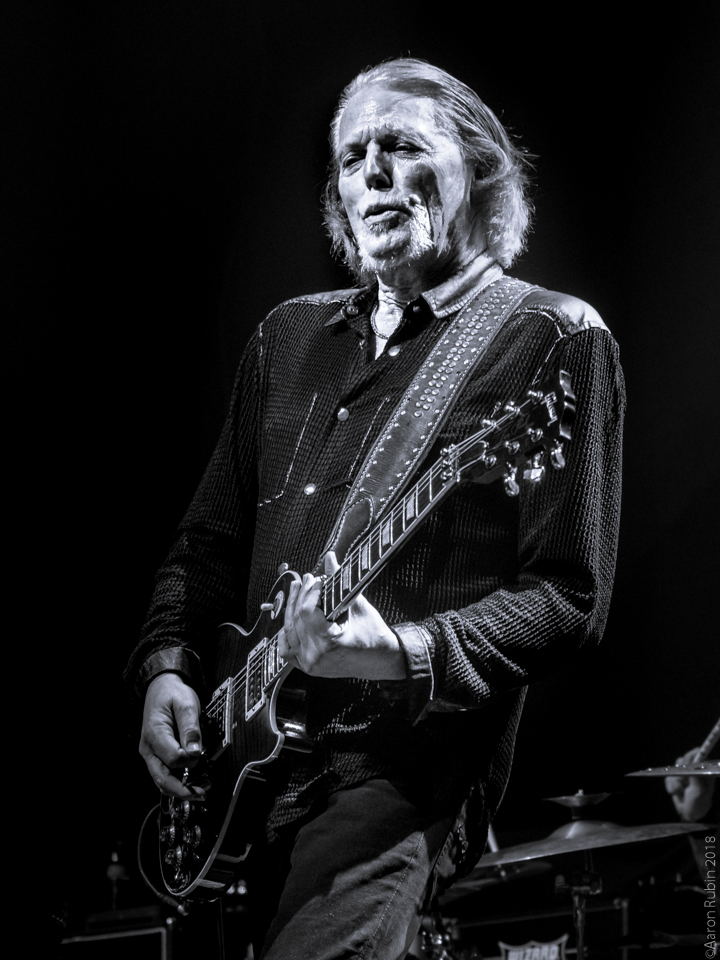
Scott Gorham playing with Black Star Riders at The Warfield Theater in San Francisco 4-19-2018

After Johnson joined the band, Gorham stated that the band members were considering recording new material, which would be the first new Thin Lizzy studio recordings since 1983. In December 2012, he co-founded the Thin Lizzy spin-off band Black Star Riders as a vehicle for the new material, rather than release it under the Thin Lizzy name. Black Star Riders' first album All Hell Breaks Loose was released in May 2013. In June 2013, he won the "Riff Lord Award" at the Metal Hammer Golden Gods Awards for his work on the album.

A second Black Star Riders album, The Killer Instinct, was released in 2015, followed by touring throughout the UK and Europe during the remainder of the year. Gorham concentrated on a small number of Thin Lizzy festival appearances during 2016, and also began work on the third Black Star Riders album. Heavy Fire was released in February 2017, and Gorham confirmed his desire to create new music rather than simply continue to play material from his past, stating, "I think it's important if you are a musician, or at least a serious one, that you want to start breaking new ground and not doing the same thing over and over. It's important to keep dipping into that songwriting well."

In September 2021, Gorham announced his departure from Black Star Riders in order to focus on Thin Lizzy.

He rejoined the band in 2023 for the 10 year anniversary tour.

== Guitar and equipment ==
When he joined Thin Lizzy, Gorham was playing a Japanese Les Paul copy, which was quickly deemed not up to standard. He is often associated with a Gibson Les Paul Deluxe guitar with mini humbuckers. This guitar was purchased at the same time as his bandmate Brian Robertson's Deluxe guitar. The two guitars could be distinguished by the fact that Gorham's guitar had a redder finish and lacked a pick-guard. In 1978 he began playing a Les Paul Standard, which became his main guitar until Thin Lizzy broke up in 1983. He can be seen using a Schecter with a Lynott style mirror scratchplate on later videos. Gorham uses only Gibson Axcess Guitars which are lighter and thinner in body width than regular Les Paul guitars, with 100-watt 1970's modded Marshall Amplifiers. Even before Thin Lizzy split up, Gorham started using Fender Stratocasters, but reverted to his Gibson Les Paul in 2006. For the Thin Lizzy 2011 tour of the UK, Gorham said that he would be returning to usage of a Gibson Les Paul, this time using a Les Paul Axcess as his main tour guitar. In an interview with Guitarist magazine he said that he had made contact with Gibson Custom Shop and had used it during rehearsals. The Axcess is different from normal Les Pauls in the fact that it makes use of a Floyd Rose tremolo and also has a thinner body among other features. Gorham's Axcess has a thinner neck than the normal models as well as a 500T pickup in the bridge position.

From 2007, Gorham was an endorsee of the German amp company, ENGL. His setup was either two or four E650 Ritchie Blackmore Signature heads, his modified Marshall, and four standard ENGL cabinets. In an interview for the August 2010 edition of Guitarist magazine, Gorham was quoted as saying that he would be using the ENGL Fireball head for the January 2011 tour of the UK with Thin Lizzy.

Early in 2016 Gorham returned to Marshall Amplification, playing through DSL100 heads and 1960BX cabs.

== Artwork ==
In April 2024, Gorham held the first exhibition of his artwork, which he had been working on in secret for over forty years, stretching back to his career with Thin Lizzy. He had not even told his wife about his drawings, and it was not until she found a folder of his artwork at home that he admitted the secret. With encouragement from his wife, he started to make his artwork public from 2021. He later said, "In all the time I travelled with the guys in Thin Lizzy, nobody ever said anything about art. I thought that if I started pulling this stuff out they'd razz me to death. And if they ridiculed me, then I'd probably stop drawing, which I didn't want to do, so I kept it as my thing. I suppose I do wonder what Phil might have thought."

Thin Lizzy cover artist Jim Fitzpatrick has praised Gorham's work, saying, "When I saw the images I was gobsmacked. I still don't think Scott believes that I like them, but I honestly do. He draws very well indeed. His work can be quite disturbing. 'The Fanatic' is extraordinary, and 'Pain' reminds me of Scott himself on stage. God alone knows what's going through his mind when he draws." Of his style, Gorham has said, "All I can say is the way that I draw is complicated."

He has also stated that he will continue to play guitar alongside showcasing his artwork: "I want to try to make it fifty / fifty; fifty percent art, fifty percent music. I don't think I can ever really actually put the guitar down."

== Personal life ==
Gorham is married, to Christine, and lives in London. His nephew Jesse Siebenberg is a professional guitarist currently performing with Lissie. His sister, Vickie, married close friend and Supertramp drummer Bob Siebenberg.

== Discography ==
=== Thin Lizzy ===
- Nightlife (1974)
- Fighting (1975)
- Jailbreak (1976)
- Johnny the Fox (1976)
- Bad Reputation (1977)
- Live and Dangerous (1978)
- Black Rose: A Rock Legend (1979)
- Chinatown (1980)
- Renegade (1981)
- Thunder and Lightning (1983)
- Life (1983)
- One Night Only (2000)

=== 21 Guns ===
- Salute (1992)
- Nothing's Real (1997)
- Demolition (2002)

=== Black Star Riders ===
- All Hell Breaks Loose (2013)
- The Killer Instinct (2015)
- Heavy Fire (2017)
- Another State of Grace (2019)

=== Other albums ===
- Pat Travers – Putting It Straight (1977)
- Phil Lynott – Solo in Soho (1980)
- Phil Lynott – The Philip Lynott Album (1982)
- Siebenberg – Giants in Our Own Room (1985)
- Supertramp – Brother Where You Bound (1985)
- Phenomena – Phenomena II: Dream Runner (1987)
- Fisc – Handle with Care (1988)
- Heads Up – The Long Shot (1989)
- Air Pavilion – Kaizoku (1989)
- Asia – Then & Now (1990)
- Lea Hart – Trapped (1992)
- True Brits – Ready to Rumble (1992)
- Phenomena – Phenomena III: Innervision (1993)
- Far Corporation – Solitude (1994)
- Max Bacon – The Higher You Climb (1995)
- Psycho Motel – Welcome to the World (1997)
- Rollins Band – Get Some Go Again (2000)
- Steevi Jaimz – Damned if I Do... Damned if I Don't (2001)
- Max Bacon – From the Banks of the River Irwell (2002)
- Ricky Warwick – Tattoos & Alibis (2003)
- The Western Front – Eureka (2026 – recorded 1983–84)
