= Gun (band) =

Scottish rock band

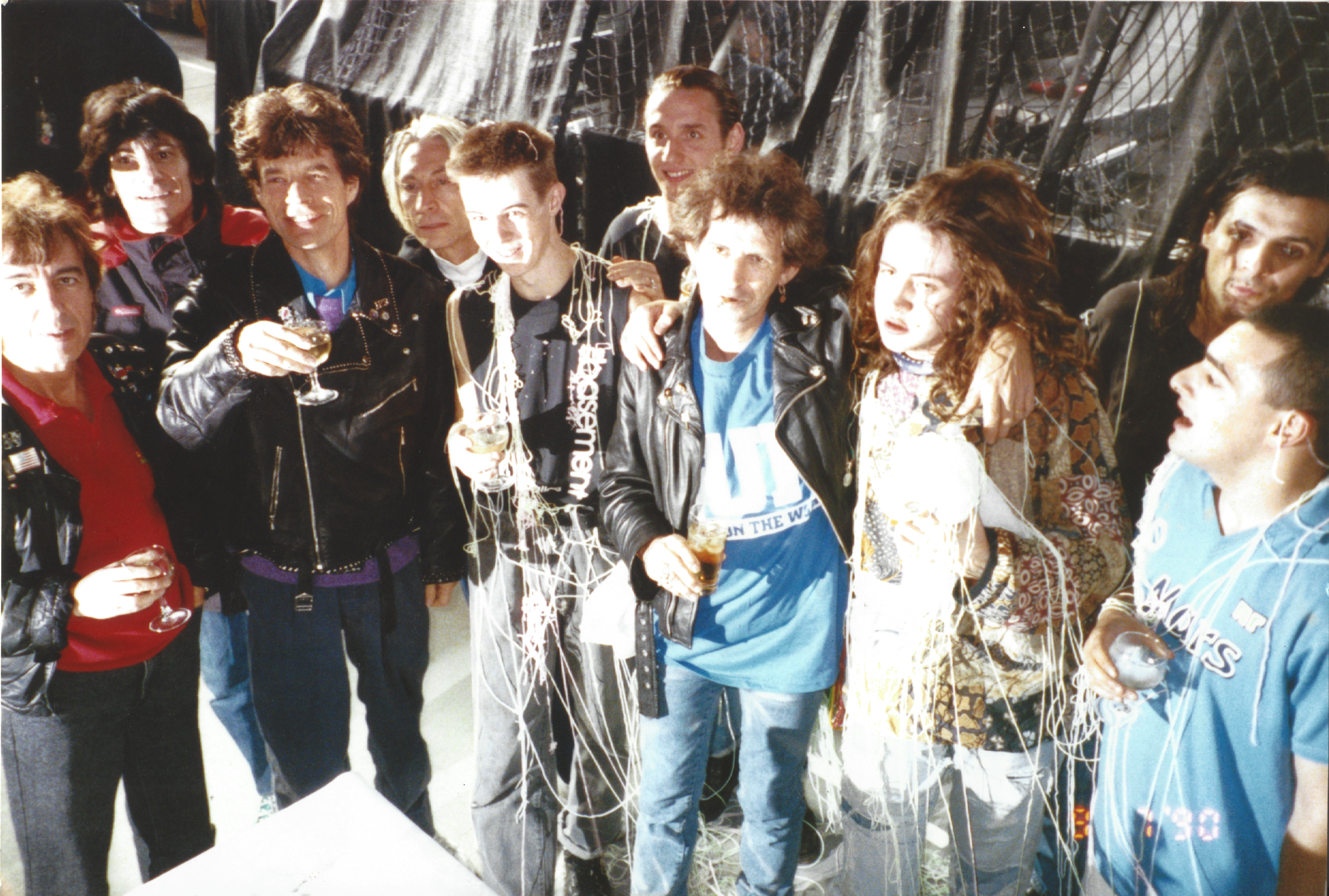
- Gun with the Rolling Stones during the Steel Wheels/Urban Jungle Tour (1989–1990)

Background information
- Also known as: G.U.N.
- Origin: Glasgow, Scotland
- Genre: Hard rock
- Years active: 1987–1997, 2008–present
- Labels: A&M, Polydor, Cooking Vinyl
- Members: Giuliano "Jools" Gizzi; Dante Gizzi; Paul McManus; Andy Carr; Ruaraidh MacFarlane
- Past members: Mark Rankin; Alan Thornton; Cami Morlotti; Greg Barnes; Derek Brown; Michael McDaid; Tommy Gentry; David Aitken; Scott Shields; Baby Stafford; Jim McDermott; Mark Kerr; Irvin Duguid; Stuart Kerr; Toby Jepson; Gordon McNeil; Johnny McGlynn; Alex Dickson; Ian G. Murray (Pre-signing)
- Website: gunofficial.co.uk

Gun are a Scottish hard rock band formed by guitarist Giuliano Gizzi. The band's music has charted across Europe. In the UK, the band has had 4 UK top-20 albums and 8 UK top-40 singles, including a cover of Cameo's "Word Up" that reached the UK top 10. Gun has toured extensively, most notably with the Rolling Stones on their Steel Wheels/Urban Jungle Tour of 1989–1990.

The band's latest album, Hombres, reached the UK top 10 and Number 1 in their homeland, Scotland. Two tracks from the album were used in the Samuel L. Jackson film Damaged.

The current lineup has two of the original members, Dante Gizzi (vocals) and Giuliano Gizzi (guitar), along with Paul McManus (drums), Andy Carr (bass), and Ruaraidh MacFarlane (guitar). The band continue to tour through 2024 with their European and UK tours.

== History ==
=== Formation and early years ===
Gun was formed in 1987 in Glasgow, Scotland, initially named Blind Allez and briefly known as Phobia. The founding members were Giuliano Gizzi (guitar), Cami Morlotti (bass), Mark Rankin (vocals), Alan Thornton (drums), and David Aitken (guitar). In 1988, the band signed with A&M Records. The lineup changed soon after with the departure of Thornton, Morlotti, and Aitken, and the addition of Dante Gizzi (bass), Scott Shields (drums), and Baby Stafford (guitar). Jim McDermott contributed drums for their early albums.

=== Breakthrough ===
Gun released their debut album, Taking On the World, in July 1989. The album was produced by Kenny MacDonald, known for his work with Texas, Del Amitri, Love and Money, Bourgie Bourgie, Wet Wet Wet and Slide. It featured a mix of hard rock and melodic elements, which set it apart from other rock albums of that era.

The lead single, "Better Days", charted within the Top 40 of the UK Singles Chart and led to the band's first appearance on Top of the Pops. Other notable tracks from the album include "Shame on You" and "Money (Everybody Loves Her)," known for their catchy hooks and robust guitar riffs.

Taking On the World received critical acclaim for its energetic delivery and solid songwriting, with international success in both singles and album charts. The album's success helped Gun get support slots with major acts like the Rolling Stones.

=== Touring and second album ===
In late 1989, Gun supported the Rolling Stones on their Steel Wheels/Urban Jungle Tour in Europe. This tour was a significant milestone for the band, allowing them to perform in massive stadiums and arenas, including venues like Wembley Stadium in London, the Olympic Stadium in Berlin, and Estadio Vicente Calderón in Madrid.

Following their extensive touring schedule, Gun recorded their second album, Gallus, with producer Kenny MacDonald. Released in 1992, the album featured the single "Steal Your Fire," which achieved chart success. Sharleen Spiteri and Alan Thornton contributed backing vocals. Gallus showcased the band's growth as musicians and songwriters, further cementing their place in the rock music landscape.

In 1992, Gun supported Def Leppard on the UK dates of their Adrenalize World Tour.

=== Swagger ===
Before the release of their third album, Swagger, both Dickson and Shields left the band. Dickson made uncredited appearances on the album before joining Bruce Dickinson's solo band in 1994 and touring with Robbie Williams extensively, leaving Giuliano Gizzi to handle all guitar duties. Mark Kerr, brother of Simple Minds' lead singer Jim Kerr, replaced Shields on drums.

Swagger became Gun's most successful album, driven by their cover of "Word Up!" which became a Top-10 hit in the UK Singles Chart, charted internationally, featured in the movie Barb Wire and won an MTV EMA award for Best Cover Version. The single "Don't Say It's Over" also achieved notable success. Gun appeared at the first T in the Park festival, showcasing their new album.

In 1996, Gun supported Bon Jovi on their These Days Tour, further solidifying their reputation as a powerful live act. Gun performed alongside Bon Jovi with tour dates across the UK.

=== 0141 632 6326 and departure of Mark Rankin ===
After a three-year break, Gun returned with new drummer Stuart Kerr (formerly of Texas) and keyboard player Irvin Duguid. They rebranded as G.U.N. to distance themselves from the Dunblane shooting incident. Their new album, 0141 632 6326, produced by INXS keyboard player Andrew Farriss, was released but did not match the success of Swagger, peaking at No. 32 in the UK Albums Chart. The band split in 1997, reuniting briefly for gigs in 1998 and 1999.

=== Dante Gizzi and Break the Silence ===
After a reunion at T in the Park 2008 as well as a further tour with Rock Radio featuring band alumni Al Thornton, Gordon McNeil, Scott Shields, and guest singer Toby Jepson, in July 2010, Gun announced that Dante Gizzi would move from bass to lead vocals. Derek Brown was confirmed as the new bass player, and Paul McManus joined as the new drummer. Gun's first gigs with the new lineup took place in early 2011 at the ABC2 in Glasgow. In December 2011, the band introduced new guitarist Johnny McGlynn and previewed tracks from their upcoming album.

Gun released their fifth album, Break the Silence, on 9 July 2012. The album marked a new era for the band, featuring a fresh lineup and a rejuvenated sound. They played at the Download Festival the same year. Break the Silence received positive reviews and helped reestablish Gun in the rock music scene.

=== Continued success and Favourite Pleasures ===
In October 2014, a 25th-anniversary edition of Taking on the World was released, featuring b-sides, live tracks, and other songs. To celebrate, the band played three sold-out nights at King Tut's Wah Wah Hut in Glasgow, performing their albums Taking on the World, Gallus, and Swagger in full.

On 23 March 2015 Gun released Frantic and toured the UK, Ireland, and Europe. They released a charity cover of Hot Chocolate's "Every 1's a Winner" with proceeds going to Macmillan Cancer Nurses, and also featured in the soundtrack and trailer for I, Tonya. The Frantic tour concluded with a sold-out show at Glasgow's Barrowlands.

Gun's seventh studio album, Favourite Pleasures, was released on 15 September 2017, and became their first top-20 album since 1994, reaching number 16 on the UK album charts.

In November 2019, to celebrate their 30th anniversary, Gun released a best-of album, R3L0ADED, and embarked on "The Big 3-0 Tour" with FM and the Dan Reed Network, playing Taking on the World in full.

=== The Calton Songs and new directions ===
On 18 May 2022 Gun announced a new album, The Calton Songs, featuring acoustic versions of their songs spanning their career. The album aimed to offer a fresh perspective on their classic tracks, bringing a more intimate and stripped-back sound. Along with the announcement, they released the single "Backstreet Brothers," which highlighted the band's continued evolution and adaptability.

The release of The Calton Songs was accompanied by a series of intimate gigs and acoustic sessions, further showcasing the band's versatility and connection with their audience. The album was well received by fans and critics alike, appreciating the new renditions of beloved songs and the band's ability to reinterpret their own work.

=== Hombres and renewed chart success ===
Gun's ninth studio album, Hombres, was released on 12 April 2024. The album reached number 10 on the UK charts and Number 1 spot in Scotland. Three versions of Hombres reached the top 10 on iTunes, including one reaching Number 1. The first single from the album is "All Fired Up".

One reviewer in Metal Talk said it was "a real celebration and a genuine contender for Album of the Year", giving it a perfect 5-star review.

The album was recorded and produced with Simon Bloor (Trevor Horn) and mixed by Darrell Thorpe (Foo Fighters).

The tracks "Pride" and "Lucky Guy" were used in the Samuel L. Jackson film Damaged, leading to a special edition release of Hombres. This period marked a significant resurgence for Gun.

== Discography ==
=== Studio albums ===
Year	Album details	Peak chart positions							Certifications
Year	Album details	UK	GER	NLD	NLD	NZ	SWE	ES	Certifications
1989	Taking on the World: Release date: 5 July 1989; Label: A&M, Caroline (2014 reissue only)	44	—	—	26	—	—	—	BPI: Silver
1992	Gallus: Release date: 31 March 1992; Label: A&M	14	—	—	—	41	—	—	
1994	Swagger: Release date: 1 July 1994; Label: A&M	5	37	14	—	17	32	—	BPI: Silver
1997	0141 632 6326: Release date: 5 May 1997; Label: A&M, Polydor	32	—	—	—	—	—	—	
2012	Break the Silence: Release date: 15 June 2012; Label: Ear Music	—	—	—	—	—	—	—	
2015	Frantic: Release date: 8 March 2015; Label: Caroline	50	—	—	—	—	—	—	
2017	Favourite Pleasures: Release date: 15 September 2017; Label: Caroline, Cloburn	16	—	—	—	—	—	—	
2022	The Calton Songs: Release date: 14 October 2022; Label: Cherry Red Records	52	—	—	—	—	—	—	
2024	Hombres: Release date: 12 April 2024; Label: Cooking Vinyl	10	—	—	—	—	—	54	
"—" denotes releases that did not chart or were not released in that territory.

=== Extended plays ===
Year	Album
2009	Popkiller: Release date: 6 December 2009; Label: Townsend
2015	East End EP: Release date: 1 July 2015; Label: Caroline

=== Compilation albums ===
Year	Album
2003	The Collection: Release date: 3 March 2003; Label: Spectrum
2006	The River Sessions: Release date: 4 April 2006; Label: River
2019	R3L0ADED: The Best of Gun: Release date: 29 November 2019; Label: Silver Lining

=== Singles ===
Year	Single	Peak positions								Album
Year	Single	UK	IRE	FRA	NLD	BEL (FL)	GER	NZ	US Rock	Album
1989	"Better Days"	33	—	—	—	—	—	7	19	Taking on the World
1989	"Money (Everybody Loves Her)"	73	—	—	—	—	—	—	—	Taking on the World
1989	"Inside Out"	57	—	—	—	—	—	—	—	Taking on the World
1990	"Taking on the World"	50	—	—	—	—	—	—	—	Taking on the World
1990	"Shame On You"	33	—	—	—	—	—	—	—	Taking on the World
1992	"Steal Your Fire"	24	—	—	—	—	—	—	—	Gallus
1992	"Higher Ground"	48	—	—	—	—	—	—	—	Gallus
1992	"Welcome To The Real World"	43	—	—	—	—	—	—	—	Gallus
1994	"Word Up!"	8	17	46	14	41	32	39	—	Swagger
1994	"Don't Say It's Over"	19	—	—	—	—	—	—	—	Swagger
1995	"The Only One"	29	—	—	—	—	—	—	—	Swagger
1995	"Something Worthwhile"	39	—	—	—	—	—	—	—	Swagger
1995	"Seems Like I'm Losing You"	—	—	—	—	—	—	—	—	Swagger
1997	"Crazy You"	21	—	—	—	—	—	—	—	0141 632 6326
1997	"My Sweet Jane"	51	—	—	—	—	—	—	—	0141 632 6326
2012	"Break the Silence"	—	—	—	—	—	—	—	—	Break the Silence
2015	"Take Me to Church"	—	—	—	—	—	—	—	—	Non-album single
2015	"Frantic"	—	—	—	—	—	—	—	—	Frantic
2015	"Labour of Life"	—	—	—	—	—	—	—	—	Frantic
2015	"Every 1's a Winner"	—	—	—	—	—	—	—	—	Frantic
2015	"Hold Your Head Up"	—	—	—	—	—	—	—	—	Frantic
2016	"Everybody Knows"	—	—	—	—	—	—	—	—	East End EP
2017	"Favourite Pleasures"	—	—	—	—	—	—	—	—	Favourite Pleasures
2017	"Silent Lovers"	—	—	—	—	—	—	—	—	Favourite Pleasures
2017	"The Boy Who Fooled the World"	—	—	—	—	—	—	—	—	Favourite Pleasures
2018	"Take Me Down"	—	—	—	—	—	—	—	—	Favourite Pleasures
2019	"Superstition"	—	—	—	—	—	—	—	—	R3l0aded
2021	"Whiskey And A Prayer"	—	—	—	—	—	—	—	—	Non-album single
2021	"Better Days 2021"	—	—	—	—	—	—	—	—	The Calton Songs
2022	"Steal Your Fire 2022"	—	—	—	—	—	—	—	—	The Calton Songs
2022	"Backstreet Brothers"	—	—	—	—	—	—	—	—	The Calton Songs
2022	"Word Up 2022"	—	—	—	—	—	—	—	—	The Calton Songs
2022	"Higher Ground 2022"	—	—	—	—	—	—	—	—	The Calton Songs
2022	"Inside Out 2022"	—	—	—	—	—	—	—	—	The Calton Songs
2022	"Coming Home 2022"	—	—	—	—	—	—	—	—	The Calton Songs
2023	"All Fired Up"	—	—	—	—	—	—	—	—	Hombres
2024	"Take Me Back Home"	—	—	—	—	—	—	—	—	Hombres
2024	"Boys Don't Cry"	—	—	—	—	—	—	—	—	Hombres
2024	"Lucky Guy"	—	—	—	—	—	—	—	—	Hombres
2024	"Falling"	—	—	—	—	—	—	—	—	Hombres
2024	"You Are What I Need"	—	—	—	—	—	—	—	—	Hombres
2024	"Pride"	—	—	—	—	—	—	—	—	Hombres Damaged Edition
"—" denotes releases that did not chart or were not released.
