= Reef discography =

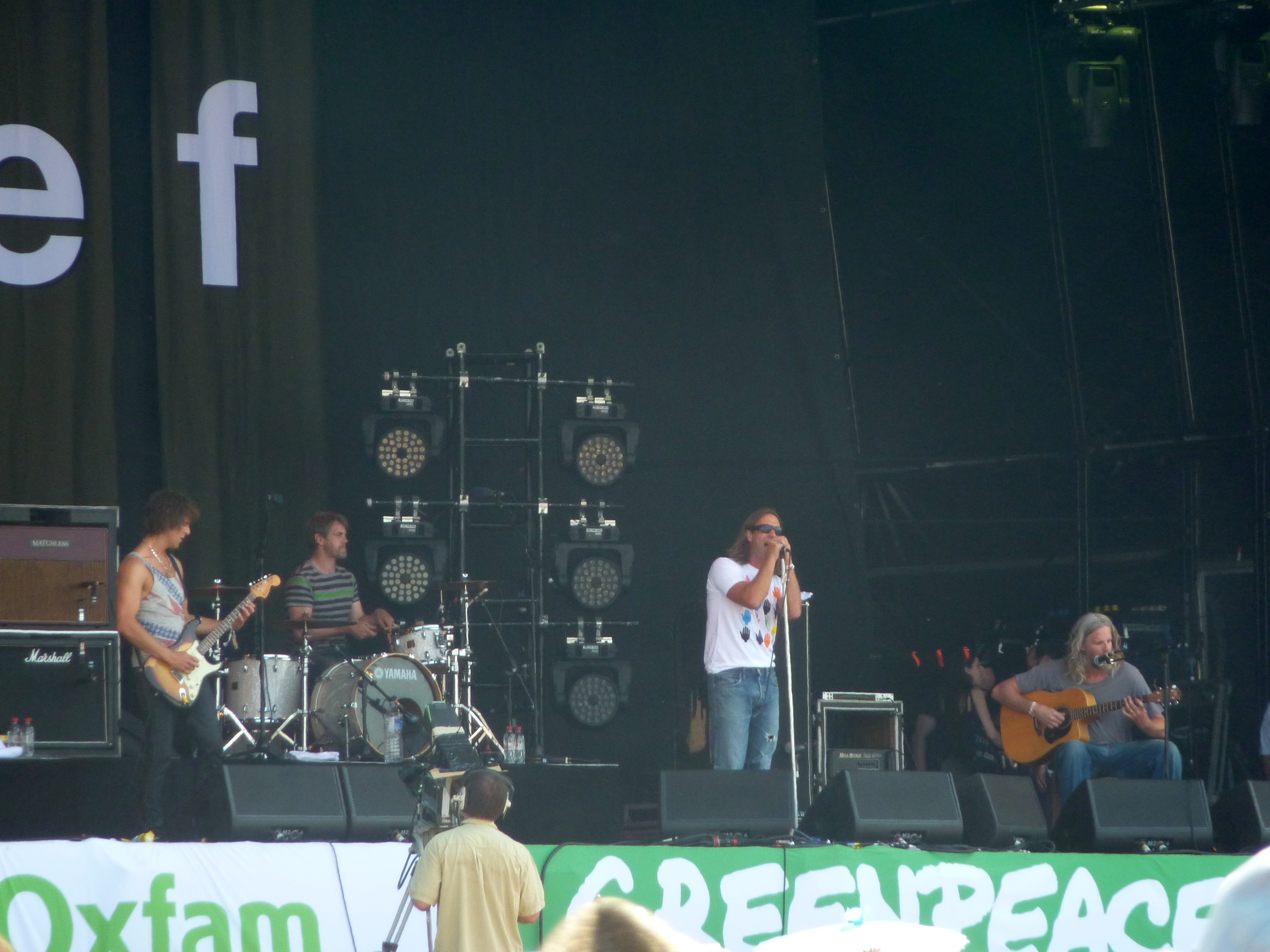
- Studio albums: 6
- Live albums: 3
- Compilation albums: 4
- Singles: 19
- Video albums: 1
- Music videos: 1

The discography of Reef, a British rock band, consists of six studio albums, four compilation albums, three live albums, one video album and nineteen singles.

== Albums ==
=== Studio albums ===
Title	Album details	Peak chart positions						Certifications (sales thresholds)
Title	Album details	UK	AUS	FIN	JPN	NED	NZ	Certifications (sales thresholds)
Replenish	Released: 19 June 1995; Label: Sony Soho Square (#480698); Formats: CD, CS, LP, MD	9	80	—	—	—	—	BPI: Gold
Glow	Released: 27 January 1997; Label: Sony Soho Square (#486940); Formats: CD, CS, LP, MD	1	18	38	84	74	12	BPI: Platinum; ARIA: Gold
Rides	Released: 12 April 1999; Label: Sony Soho Square (492882 2); Format: CD	3	39	—	56	—	36	BPI: Silver
Getaway	Released: 18 August 2000; Label: Sony Soho Square (498891 2); Format: CD	15	63	—	81	—	—	
Revelation	Released: 4 May 2018; Label: earMUSIC; Format: CD, DL	26	—	—	—	—	—	
Shoot Me Your Ace	Released: 29 April 2022; Label: Raging Sea; Format: CD, DL	20	—	—	—	—	—	
"—" denotes a release that did not chart or was not issued in that region.

=== Compilation albums ===
Title	Album details	Charts	
Title	Album details	UK	JPN
Together, The Best Of...	Released: 27 January 2003; Label: Sony Soho Square (509435 2); Format: CD	52	97
The Best Of...	Released: 24 March 2008; Label: Sony (88697 24923 2); Format: CD	—	—
The Collection	Released: 28 September 2009; Label: Sony (88697 55395 2); Format: CD	—	—
93/03	Released: 26 March 2012; Label: Metropolis; Format: 9CD+DVD	—	—
"—" denotes a release that did not chart or was not issued in that region.

=== Live albums ===
Title	Album details
Live From Metropolis Studios	Released: 16 December 2013; Label: Metropolis; Format: Digital download
Live at St. Ives	Released: 11 March 2016; Label: Reefband; Format: CD, LP, digital download
In Motion: Live from Hammersmith	Released: 22 February 2019; Label: earMUSIC; Format: CD/Blu-ray, LP/Blu-ray, digital download

=== Video albums ===
Title	Album details
Reef Live	Released: 18 August 2003; Label: Snapper (SMADVD 019); Format: DVD

== Singles ==
Year	Song	Peak chart positions					Certifications	Album
Year	Song	UK	AUS	NED	NZ	US Main.	Certifications	Album
1995	"Good Feeling"	24	—	—	—	—		Replenish
1995	"Naked"	11	—	—	—	—		Replenish
1995	"Weird"	19	—	—	—	—		Non-album single
1996	"Place Your Hands"	6	28	85	21	29	BPI: Platinum; RMNZ: Platinum	Glow
1997	"Come Back Brighter"	8	—	—	—	—		Glow
1997	"Consideration"	13	—	—	—	—		Glow
1997	"Yer Old"	21	—	—	—	—		Glow
1999	"I've Got Something to Say"	15	—	—	—	—		Rides
1999	"Sweety"	46	—	—	—	—		Rides
1999	"New Bird"	73	—	—	—	—		Rides
2000	"Set the Record Straight"	19	—	88	—	—		Getaway
2000	"Superhero"	55	—	—	—	—		Getaway
2001	"All I Want"	51	—	—	—	—		Getaway
2003	"Give Me Your Love"	44	—	—	—	—		Together, The Best Of...
2003	"Waster"	56	—	—	—	—		Non-album single
2014	"Barking At Trees"	—	—	—	—	—		Non-album single
2016	"How I Got Over"	—	—	—	—	—		Revelation
2018	"My Sweet Love" (feat. Sheryl Crow)	—	—	—	—	—		Revelation
2018	"Revelation"	—	—	—	—	—		Revelation
2021	"Shoot Me Your Ace"	—	—	—	—	—		Shoot Me Your Ace
2022	"Wolfman" / "Right On"	—	—	—	—	—		Shoot Me Your Ace
2022	"Best of Me"	—	—	—	—	—		Shoot Me Your Ace
"—" denotes a release that did not chart or was not issued in that region.
