= List of UK Rock & Metal Albums Chart number ones of 1999 =

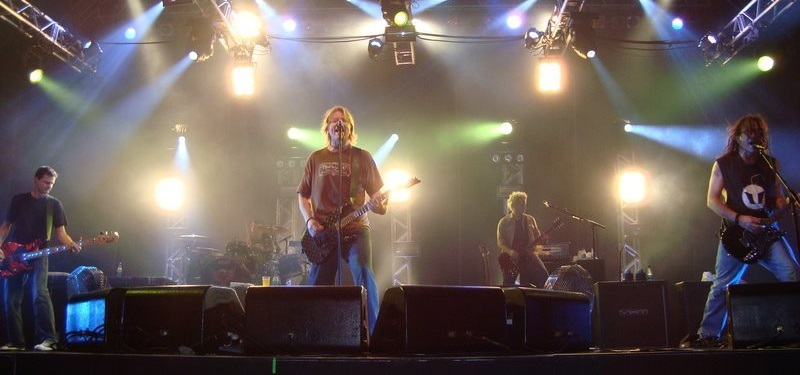
Americana by The Offspring was the longest-running UK Rock & Metal Albums Chart number-one album of 1999, spending 17 weeks atop the chart.

The UK Rock & Metal Albums Chart is a record chart which ranks the best-selling rock and heavy metal albums in the United Kingdom. Compiled and published by the Official Charts Company, the data is based on each album's weekly physical sales, digital downloads and streams. In 1999, there were 19 albums that topped the 52 published charts. The first number-one album of the year was Metallica's covers album Garage Inc., which remained at number one for the opening week of the year at the end of a five-week run which began in the week ending 5 December 1998. The final number-one album of the year was Live Era '87–'93, the first live album by American hard rock band Guns N' Roses, which spent the last three weeks of the year (and the first one of 2000) at number one.

The most successful album on the UK Rock & Metal Albums Chart in 1999 was The Offspring's fourth studio album Americana, which spent a total of 17 weeks at number one over six spells, including a run of ten consecutive weeks between January and March. Americana was the best-selling rock and metal album of the year, ranking 50th in the UK End of Year Albums Chart. The Matrix: Music from the Motion Picture spent six weeks at number one, Blood Sugar Sex Magik by Red Hot Chili Peppers was number one for four weeks in 1999, the self-titled debut album by Garbage topped the chart for three weeks, and five albums – Rides, Nevermind, The Burning Red, Experience Hendrix: The Best of Jimi Hendrix and The Battle of Los Angeles – each spent two weeks at number one on the chart in 1999.

== Chart history ==
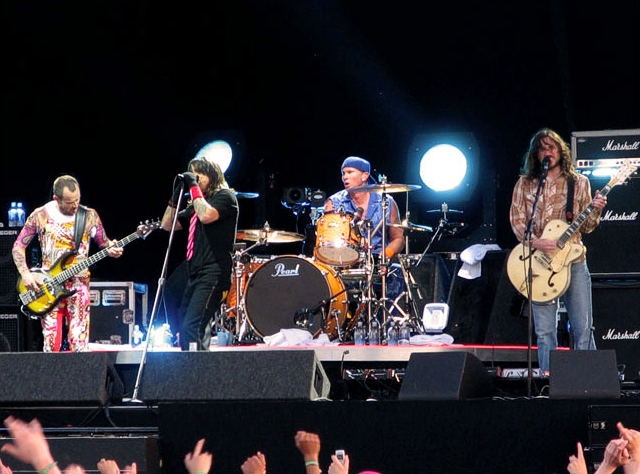
Red Hot Chili Peppers spent four weeks at number one in 1999 with their 1991 release Blood Sugar Sex Magik.

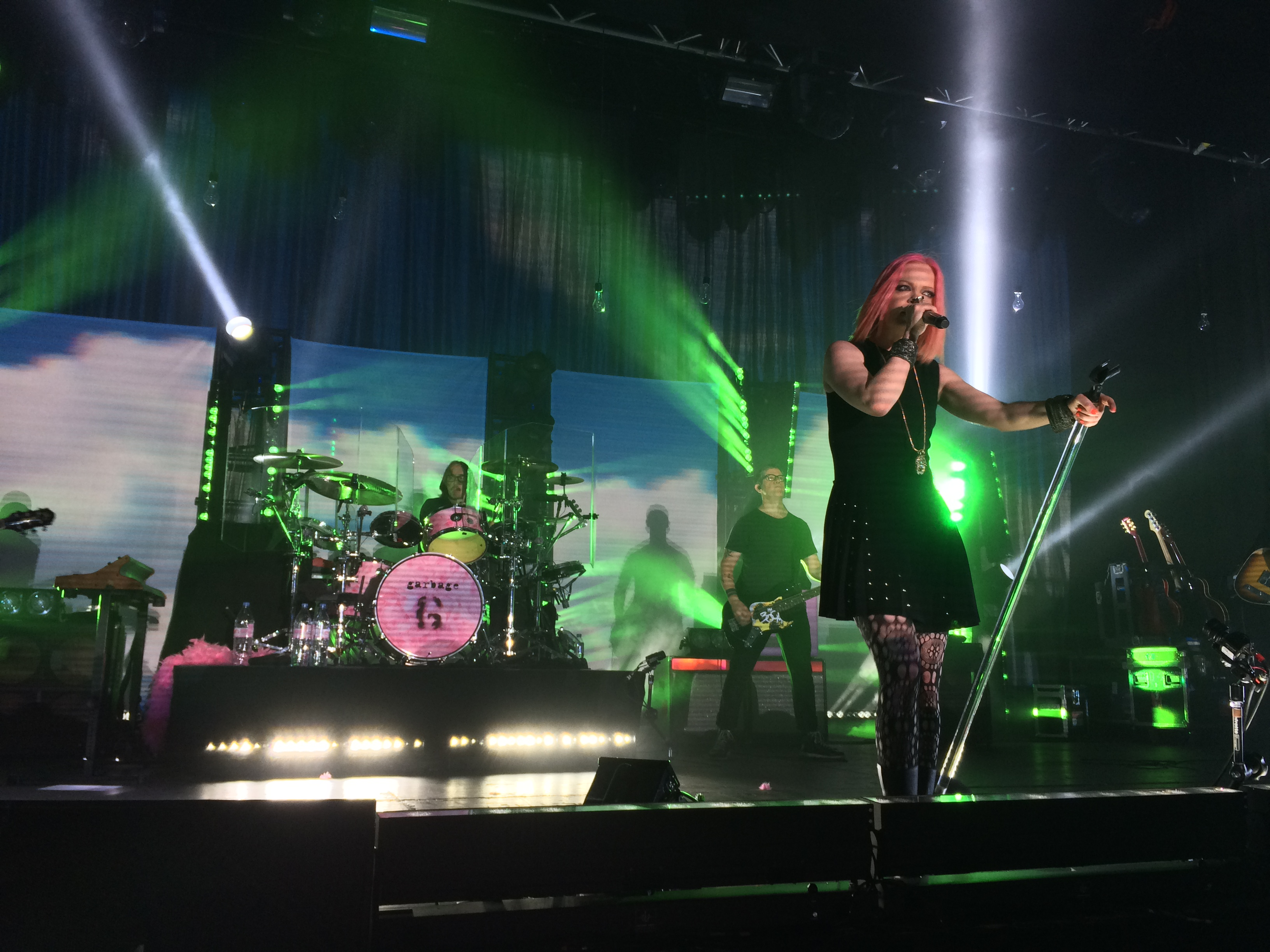
Garbage's self-titled debut album spent three weeks at number one in 1999.

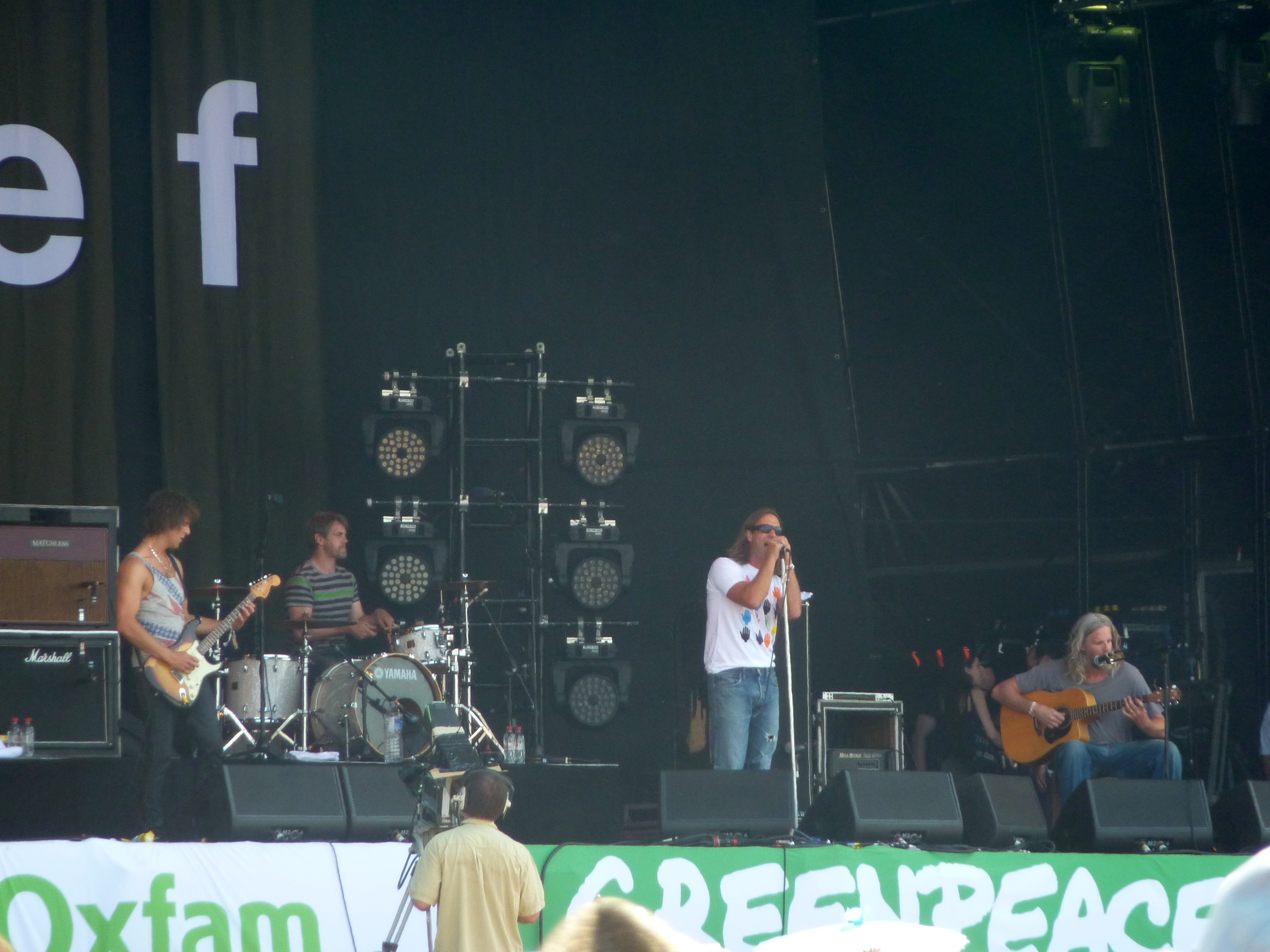
Reef's third studio album Rides was number one for two weeks in 1999.

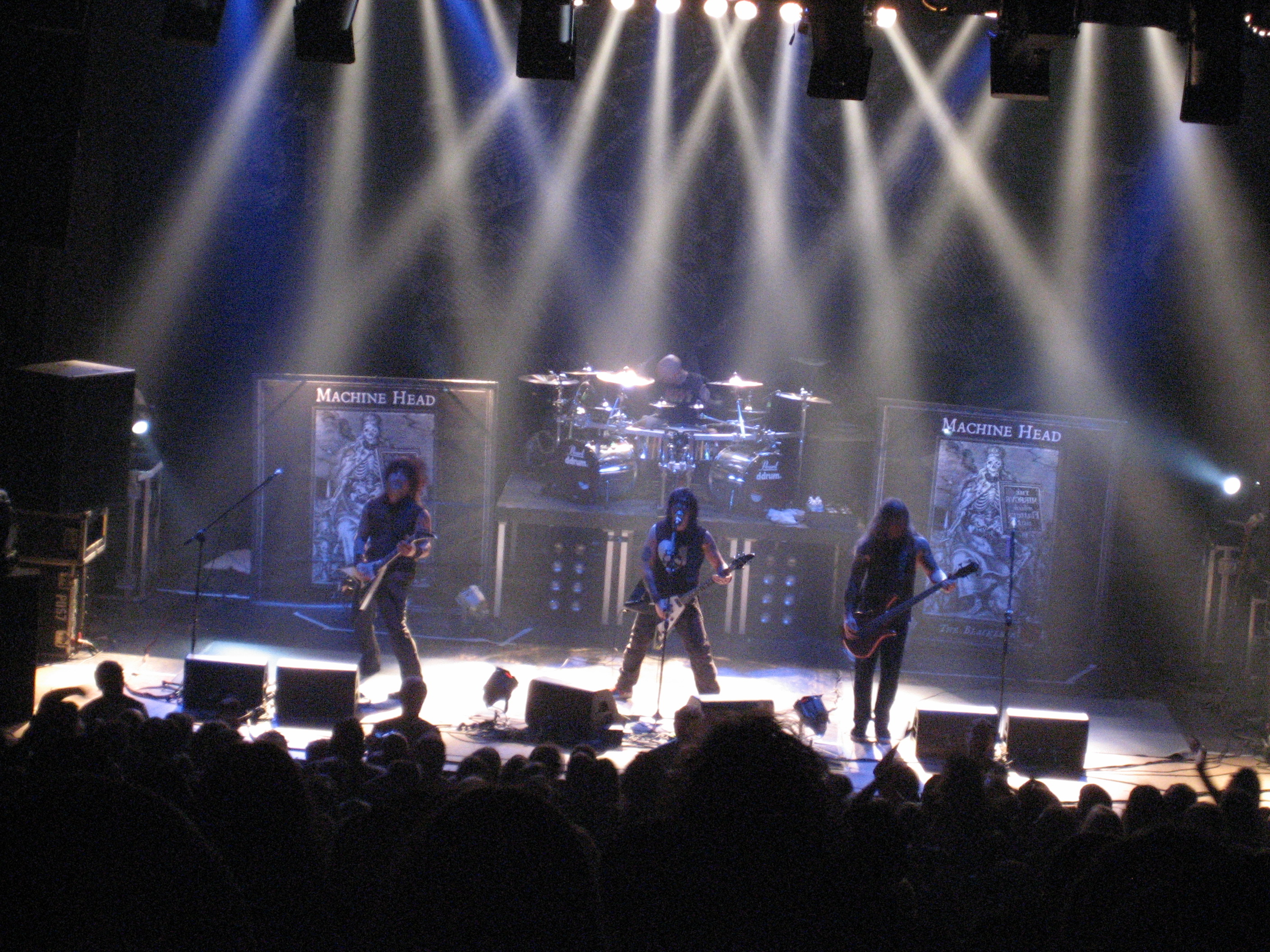
Machine Head achieved their first number one with The Burning Red.

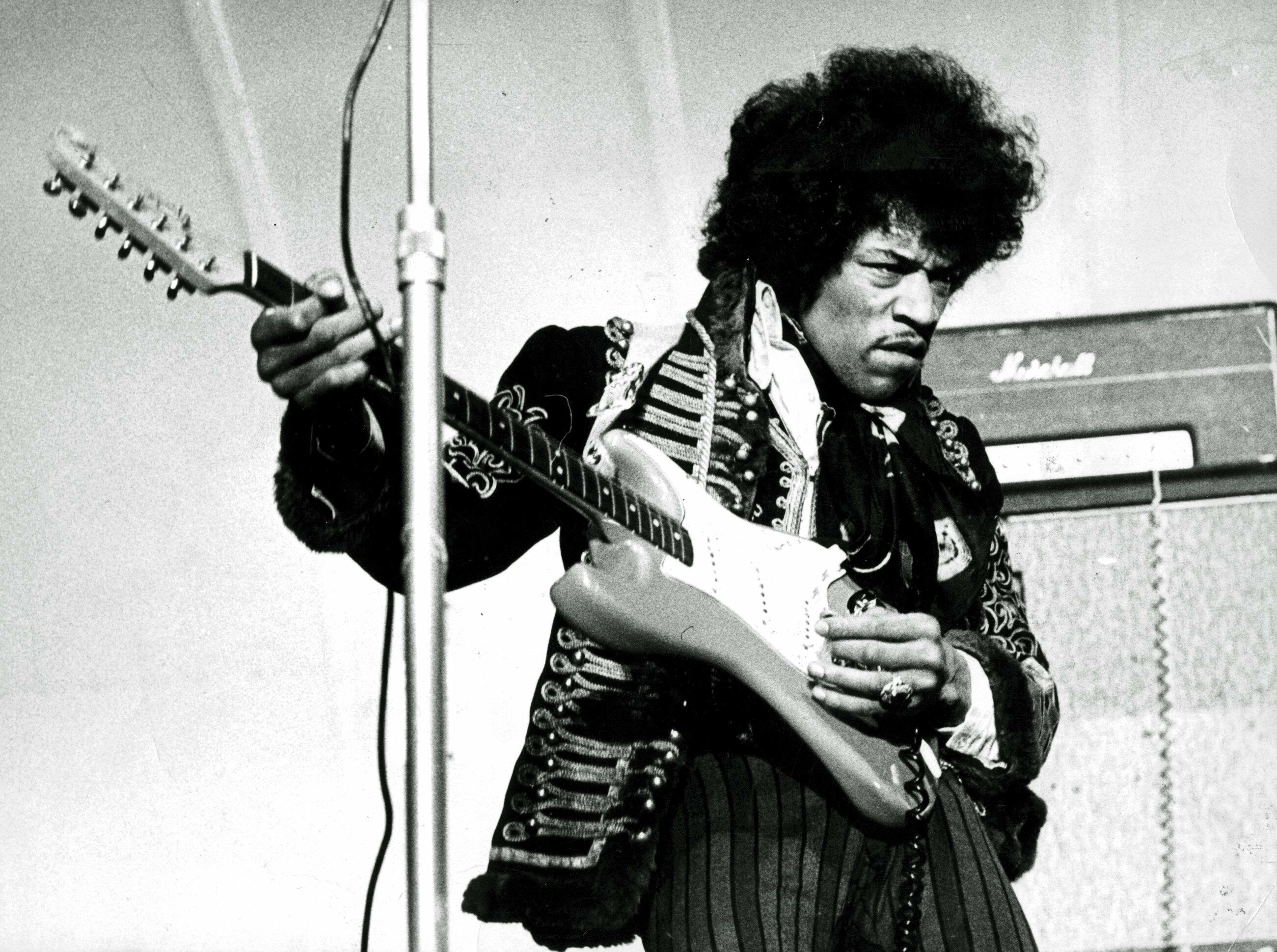
Jimi Hendrix compilation Experience Hendrix: The Best of Jimi Hendrix spent two weeks at number one in 1999.

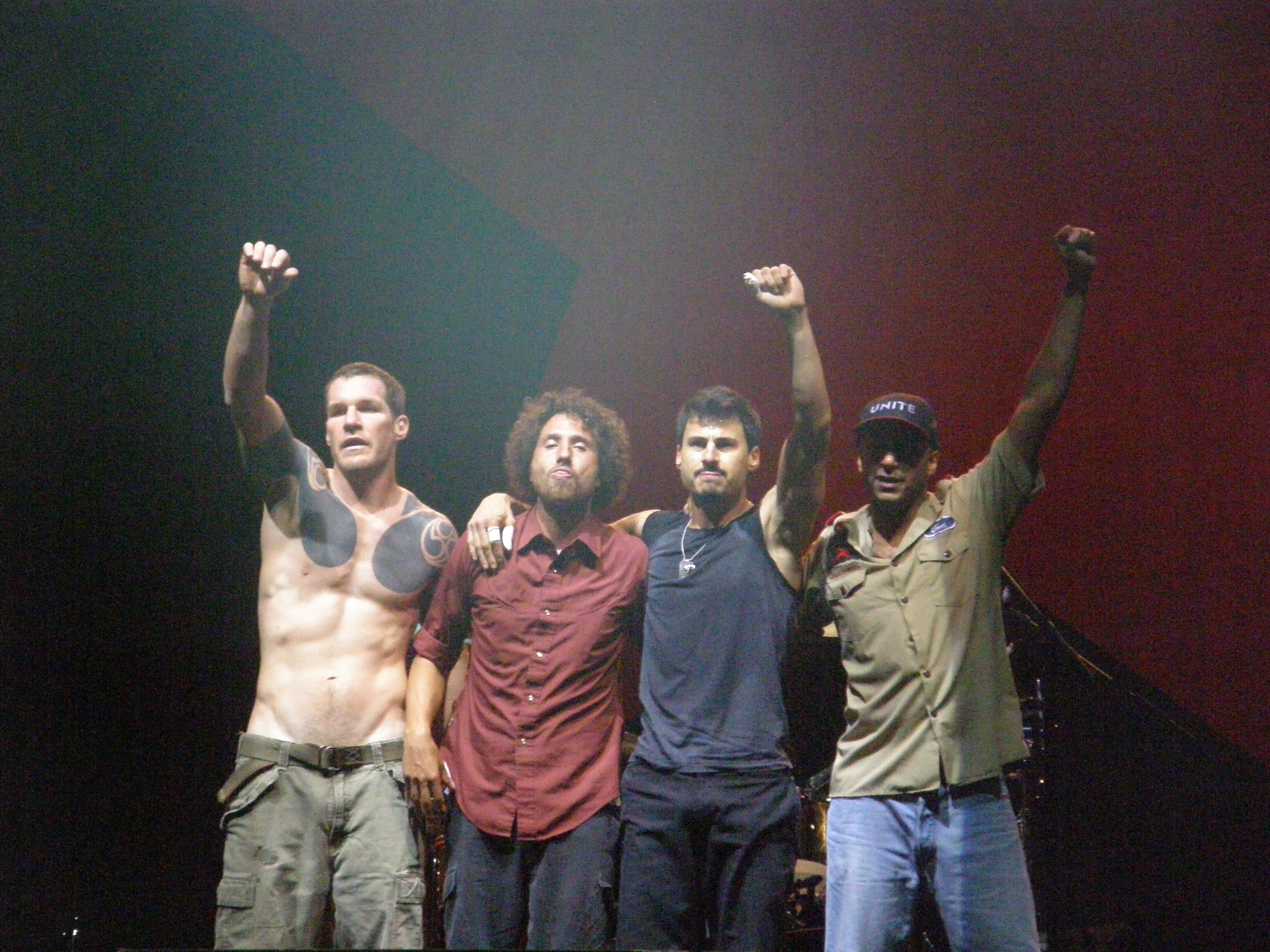
Rage Against the Machine's third studio album The Battle of Los Angeles was number one for two weeks.

Key
†	Indicates best-selling rock album of 1999

Issue date	Album	Artist(s)	Record label(s)	Ref.
2 January	Garage Inc.	Metallica	Vertigo	
9 January	Nevermind	Nirvana	Geffen	
16 January	Americana †	The Offspring	Columbia	
23 January	Americana †	The Offspring	Columbia	
30 January	Americana †	The Offspring	Columbia	
6 February	Americana †	The Offspring	Columbia	
13 February	Americana †	The Offspring	Columbia	
20 February	Americana †	The Offspring	Columbia	
27 February	Americana †	The Offspring	Columbia	
6 March	Americana †	The Offspring	Columbia	
13 March	Americana †	The Offspring	Columbia	
20 March	Americana †	The Offspring	Columbia	
27 March	Neon Ballroom	Silverchair	Columbia	
3 April	Post Orgasmic Chill	Skunk Anansie	Virgin	
10 April	Under the Influence	Status Quo	Eagle	
17 April	Blood Sugar Sex Magik	Red Hot Chili Peppers	Warner Bros.	
24 April	Americana †	The Offspring	Columbia	
1 May	Rides	Reef	Sony S2	
8 May	Rides	Reef	Sony S2	
15 May	Americana †	The Offspring	Columbia	
22 May	Americana †	The Offspring	Columbia	
29 May	Americana †	The Offspring	Columbia	
5 June	Garbage	Garbage	Mushroom	
12 June	Garbage	Garbage	Mushroom	
19 June	Experience Hendrix: The Best of Jimi Hendrix	Jimi Hendrix	Telstar	
26 June	Euphoria	Def Leppard	Bludgeon Riffola	
3 July	The Matrix: Music from the Motion Picture	Various artists	Maverick	
10 July	The Matrix: Music from the Motion Picture	Various artists	Maverick	
17 July	The Matrix: Music from the Motion Picture	Various artists	Maverick	
24 July	The Matrix: Music from the Motion Picture	Various artists	Maverick	
31 July	Nevermind	Nirvana	Geffen	
7 August	The Matrix: Music from the Motion Picture	Various artists	Maverick	
14 August	The Matrix: Music from the Motion Picture	Various artists	Maverick	
21 August	The Burning Red	Machine Head	Roadrunner	
28 August	The Burning Red	Machine Head	Roadrunner	
4 September	Garbage	Garbage	Mushroom	
11 September	Americana †	The Offspring	Columbia	
18 September	Chamber Music	Coal Chamber	Roadrunner	
25 September	Americana †	The Offspring	Columbia	
2 October	World Coming Down	Type O Negative	Roadrunner	
9 October	Experience Hendrix: The Best of Jimi Hendrix	Jimi Hendrix	Telstar	
16 October	Blood Sugar Sex Magik	Red Hot Chili Peppers	Warner Bros.	
23 October	Blood Sugar Sex Magik	Red Hot Chili Peppers	Warner Bros.	
30 October	Blood Sugar Sex Magik	Red Hot Chili Peppers	Warner Bros.	
6 November	The Science of Things	Bush	Trauma/Polydor	
13 November	The Battle of Los Angeles	Rage Against the Machine	Epic	
20 November	The Battle of Los Angeles	Rage Against the Machine	Epic	
27 November	Issues	Korn	Epic	
4 December	Americana †	The Offspring	Columbia	
11 December	Live Era '87–'93	Guns N' Roses	Geffen	
18 December	Live Era '87–'93	Guns N' Roses	Geffen	
25 December	Live Era '87–'93	Guns N' Roses	Geffen	

== See also ==
- 1999 in British music
- List of UK Rock & Metal Singles Chart number ones of 1999
