= Together (Reef album) =

Compilation album by Reef
- Released: 2003
- Length: 46.74
- Label: Sony

Reef chronology
Getaway (2000)	Together (2003)	The Best Of Reef (2008)

Professional ratings
Review scores
Source	Rating
Allmusic	4/5 stars

Together is a greatest hits album by Reef released in 2003. It contains most of the band's singles and some non-LP tracks. Track 14 is a cover of Mickey Newbury's "Just Dropped In (To See What Condition My Condition Was In)".

== Track listing ==
1. "Give Me Your Love" – 3:53
2. "Good Feeling" – 3:47
3. "Naked" – 3:12
4. "Weird" – 2:54
5. "Place Your Hands" – 3:38
6. "Come Back Brighter" – 3:33
7. "Consideration" – 3:34
8. "Yer Old" – 3:12
9. "I've Got Something to Say" – 4:06
10. "Set the Record Straight" – 3:55
11. "Lucky Number" – 3:28
12. "Stone For Your Love" – 2:32
13. "Talk to Me" – 3:05
14. "Just Dropped In (To See What Condition My Condition Was In)" – 2:52
