= Carbon/Silicon =

Rock music duo

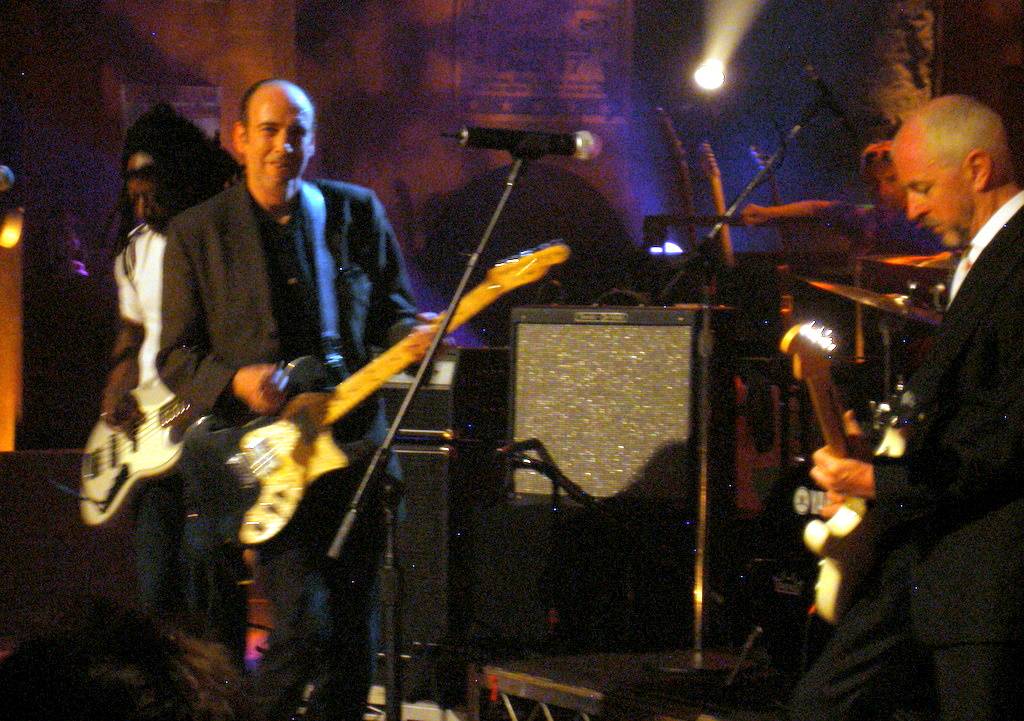
- Carbon/Silicon performing in 2008

Background information
- Origin: London, England
- Genres: Garage rock; alternative rock
- Years active: 2002–present
- Labels: Carbon-Silicon; Caroline
- Members: Mick Jones; Tony James; Dominic Greensmith; Jesse Wood
- Past members: William Blake; Danny The Red; Leo "Eazykill" Williams
- Website: carbonsilicon.com

Carbon/Silicon were an English rock music duo consisting of Mick Jones (formerly of The Clash and Big Audio Dynamite) and Tony James (formerly of Generation X and Sigue Sigue Sputnik). The band formed around 2002.

== Career ==
Similar in many respects to Jones' earlier work in Big Audio Dynamite, Carbon/Silicon aims to break the traditional approach to rock and roll. The band was described by critic Alan McGee as "...the Stones jamming with a laptop," as they initially made extensive use of samples in their recordings and live shows but have given up that practice in recent years. The formation of the band was catalyzed by the internet and file sharing. The first song written by Jones and James was entitled "MPFree," in which they expressed their willingness to embrace the technology of the internet and file sharing, in the interest of spreading music, rather than profit. The band still makes live bootlegs and recordings freely available through their own website, and the fansite.

Carbon/Silicon recorded four demo CDs: Sample This, Peace; Dope Factory Boogie; The Grand Delusion and The Homecoming. The band's first officially released album, A.T.O.M (A Twist of Modern) debuted on the band's website on 28 July 2006. The next album Western Front followed soon after on 14 October 2006 and included re-recorded versions of their earlier songs. The group's third album, The Crackup Suite was released in March 2007. The same month it was announced that Leo "Eazykill" Williams, former bandmate of Jones with BAD would play bass for the group, and that Dominic Greensmith formerly of Reef would take up the drum slot. The band further released two EP's plus another album The Last Post and toured, including the Isle of Wight Festival and dates in the USA. In 2008, in collaboration with Callicore Studio, Carbon/Silicon released an animated video for "The News", a song from the album The Last Post.

In January 2008, in what is seen as a return to their roots, the band played seven weekly concerts at a tiny venue Inn on the Green in Ladbroke Grove, London. At the first gig, Topper Headon (Jones's bandmate in The Clash) got up and played with the band for two songs. Jones' daughter, Lauren, sang with the band at Carbon Casino 3 and 4 in sets that were highlighted by Hitsville UK. At the final gig, Carbon Casino 7, the Alabama Three took to the stage with Jones and James to perform the theme from US TV series, The Sopranos. Throughout the run, support was provided by West London bands Taurus Trakker, The Rotten Hill Gang, and The Self, songwriter John Byrne, icons Pete Wylie, Glen Matlock, James Dean-Bradfield, John Cooper Clarke, and new young bands including West London's The Dirty Curtains, North London band The Usual Suspects and the Savage Nomads.

In 2009 the band released The Carbon Bubble - their fourth full-length digital album release - free of charge at their official web site.

2010 has seen a further line-up change, with Jesse Wood replacing Leo Williams on bass, and the band has performed a number of festival dates at international venues, including the Neapolis festival (Naples) and Arthur's Day (Dublin).

Later in 2010, their four free digital release albums were removed from their site and released commercially on iTunes and Amazon. The Crackup Suite was retitled The Crackup Suite Parts 1 and 2 and had six additional tracks added to it (four of which were previously unreleased) and Carbon Bubble had two previously unreleased tracks added to it. Since then, Carbon/Silicon has not been active besides a few scattered tours. In early 2013, they commercially released one additional song for download titled Big Surprise (with an accompanying video on YouTube) causing fans to briefly hope that more was to come, but it was only an outtake from their earlier recordings and it appears that nothing else is in the works at the moment.

== Band members ==
=== Current members ===
- Mick Jones - lead vocals, guitar (2002–present)
- Tony James - guitar (2002–present)

With:

- Dominic Greensmith - drums, percussion (2007–present)
- Jesse Wood - bass (2010–present)

=== Former members ===
- William Blake - bass (2004–2005)
- Danny The Red - drums (2004–2005)
- Leo "Eazykill" Williams - bass (2007–2010)

== Discography ==
=== Demo recordings ===
- Sample This, Peace (2003)
- Dope Factory Boogie (2003)
- The Grand Delusion (2004)
- The Homecoming (2004)

=== Free digital releases ===
- Value What Is Necessary EP (2006)
- The Global War on Culture EP (2006)
- The News 12" single (2006)
- Experimental! EP (2006)
- Oil Well EP (2006)
- A.T.O.M (2006)
- The Magic Suitcase EP (2006)
- The Gangs Of England EP (2006)
- Why Do Men Fight EP (2006)
- Western Front (2006)
- The Crackup Suite (2007)
- Maybe Thats the Meaning of Life (2007)
- The Carbon Bubble (2009)

=== Commercial digital releases ===
- A.T.O.M (2010)
- Western Front (2010)
- The Crackup Suite Parts 1 and 2 (2010)
- The Carbon Bubble (2010)
- Big Surprise (2013)

=== Physical releases ===
- The News EP (2007) No. 59 UK Singles Chart
- The Magic Suitcase EP (2007) No. 7 UK Indie Chart
- The Last Post (2007)
- Carbon Casino (2007, live album)
- Why Do Men Fight? (2008, single)
