= Last Post (disambiguation) =

Last Post is a ceremonial musical call.

Last Post or The Last Post may also refer to:

- Last Post (poem), a 2009 poem by Carol Ann Duffy
- Last Post (novel), a 1928 novel by Ford Madox Ford
- Last Post, a 2008 novel by Robert Barnard
- The Last Post (film), a 1929 British silent film
- The Last Post (short film), a 2001 short film about the Falkland War
- The Last Post (album), a 2007 album by Carbon/Silicon
- The Last Post (TV series), a 2017 BBC TV series about British involvement in North Yemen Civil War and the Aden Emergency
- The Last Post, a podcast offshoot of The Bugle

== See also ==
- First post (disambiguation)
