= The Last Post (album) =

Studio album by Carbon/Silicon
- Released: October 9, 2007
- Recorded: circa. 2006–2007
- Genre: Rock
- Length: 61:15
- Label: Carbon Silicon Records
- Producer: Bill Price/Mick Jones

Carbon/Silicon chronology
The Magic Suitcase EP (2007)	The Last Post (2007)

Professional ratings
Review scores
Source	Rating
AllMusic	4/5 stars

The Last Post is the first physical (CD) album released by Carbon/Silicon, preceded by the EPs The News and The Magic Suitcase. Released in 2007, the album consists of one new track and new Bill Price mixes of older tracks from previous download only releases A.T.O.M and Western Front.

A subsequent 2008 French version, with new artwork, added two further tracks ("Ignore Alien Orders" and "I Loved You") and a second disc featuring the live set Live At Carbon Casino VII.

== Track listing ==
All songs by Tony James and Mick Jones

1. "The News" - 5:39
2. "Magic Suitcase" - 4:26
3. "The Whole Truth" - 4:42
4. "Caesars Palace" - 5:28
5. "Tell It Like It Is" - 5:09
6. "War on Culture" - 6:03
7. "What the Fuck" - 3:14
8. "Acton Zulus" - 4:42
9. "National Anthem" - 5:10
10. "Really the Blues" - 5:30
11. "Oilwell" - 5:55
12. "Why Do Men Fight?" - 5:17
13. "Ignore Alien Orders" - 5:41 (French version only)
14. "I Loved You" - 4:30 (French version only)

== Personnel ==
- Mick Jones - vocals, guitar
- Tony James - guitar, producer
- Leo "E-ezy Kill" Williams - bass
- Dominic Greensmith - drums
- Tim Young - mastering
- Neil Tucker - assistant
- Tim Roe - assistant
- Declan Gaffney - assistant
- Zoe Smith - assistant
- James "Famous" Jones - design
- Chris Page - promoter
