= King's House School =

Coordinates: 51°27′34″N 0°17′35″W

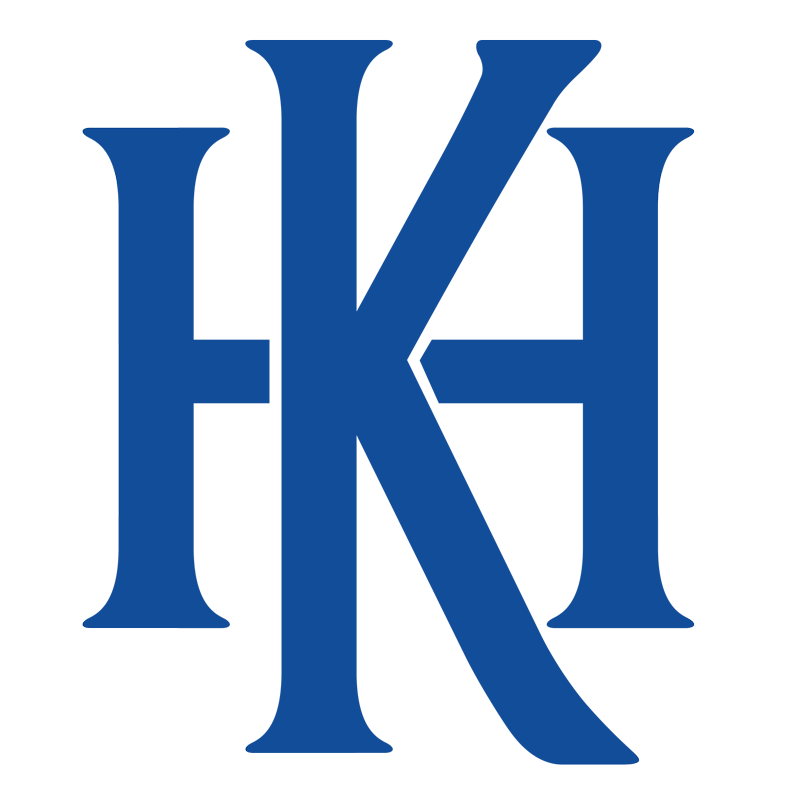

Location
- Kings Road; Richmond, London, TW10 6ES; England

Information
- Type: Private school Preparatory school
- Established: 1946
- Head: Mark Turner
- Staff: 86
- Gender: Boys
- Age: 3 to 13
- Enrolment: 450
- Colours: Blue & White
- Website: www.kingshouseschool.org

King's House School is a private day preparatory school in Richmond, London. Founded in 1946, it has 450 pupils aged between 3 and 13.

== Present school ==
The school is currently split into three parts:

- King's House Nursery School (ages 3–4)
- King's House Junior School (ages 4–8)
- King's House Senior School (ages 9–13)

== Facilities ==
- 35-acre sports ground and club house
- State-of-art theatre
- Music and Mac suite
- Gymnasium
- Astroturf
- Science laboratories
- Theatre
- Two ICT suites

== Sport ==
The school specialises in the three sports of rugby, cricket and football. Football operates at the beginning of the year until the winter term, when rugby comes in play. Cricket follows in the summer term. Sports lessons take place at King's House Sports Ground in nearby Chiswick.

The school also supports athletics, basketball, cross-country, fitness training, gymnastics, judo and swimming.

== Choir ==
In the late 1970s, the school's choir was involved in West End performances, supplying a chorus for the Andrew Lloyd Webber stage musical, Evita. In 1989, a new generation of singers provided vocals on Mike + The Mechanics' chart-topping single "The Living Years".

== Major achievements ==
- Exterior featured in the 1995 children's television series Julia Jekyll and Harriet Hyde
- 2006 National IAPS General Knowledge Award
- 2015 u14 National Rugby champions

== Historical case of child abuse ==
Former teacher Michael Porteous was sentenced in 2014 to two-and-a-half years in prison for sexually abusing a pupil at the school in the 1970s. The school issued a statement, saying: "We are shocked that a former teacher of the school abused his position of trust in this way and committed a deplorable crime against a pupil in his care."

== Alumni ==
- Lawrence Dallaglio, former England rugby captain
- Zac Goldsmith, former Conservative MP for Richmond Park
- Nigel Planer, actor, comedian, novelist and playwright
- Jesse Wood, son of Ronnie Wood
- Louis Lynagh, Italian international rugby player
- Tom Lynagh, Australian international rugby player
