= First post =

First post may refer to:

- Firstpost, an Indian news website
- The First Post, a British daily online news magazine
- First post, an Internet meme written by an internet user to indicate their discovery of an until-then uncommented entry
- A British Army bugle call signalling start of sentry-post inspections, ending in Last Post

== See also ==
- Last Post (disambiguation)
- First-past-the-post voting
