= Lawrence Dallaglio =

British Lions & England international rugby union footballer

Lawrence Dallaglio OBE
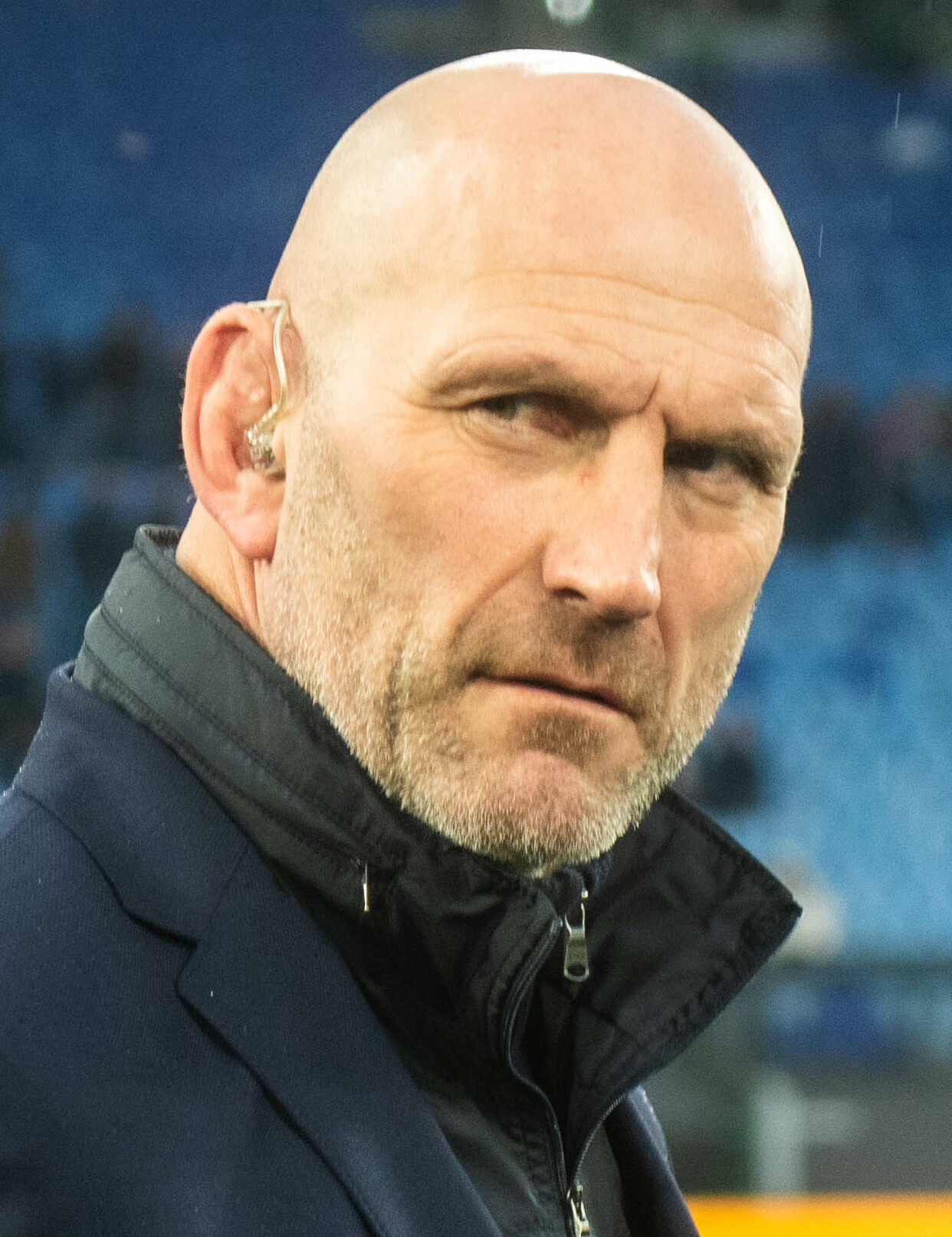
- Dallaglio in 2023
- Born: Lorenzo Bruno Nero Dallaglio; 10 August 1972 (age 54) London, England
- Height: 6 ft 4 in (1.93 m)
- Weight: 247 lb (112 kg)
- School: King's House School; Ampleforth College
- University: Kingston University

Rugby union career
- Position(s): Flanker, Number eight
Senior career
Years	Team	Apps	(Points)
1990–2008	Wasps	326	(163)
International career
Years	Team	Apps	(Points)
1995–2007	England	85	(85)
1997, 2001, 2005	British & Irish Lions	3	(0)
National sevens team
Years	Team		Comps
1993	England		RWC 7s

Lorenzo Bruno Nero Dallaglio OBE (born 10 August 1972) is an English retired rugby union player. He is a former captain of England, and a 2016 inductee of the World Rugby Hall of Fame.

Dallaglio played as a flanker or number eight for London Wasps and never played for another club, having arrived at Sudbury as a teenager. Playing in all three positions in the back row, he played 85 caps for England, and was part of the team that won the 2003 World Cup. He is one of a very small number of players to have won both the Rugby World Cup and Sevens World Cup. He went on three tours with the British & Irish Lions, winning three caps.

Dallaglio now regularly works as a pundit on television rugby coverage and on radio.

== Early life ==
Dallaglio was born in Shepherd's Bush, London. He was educated at King's House School in Richmond and boarded at Ampleforth College where he was nicknamed "Del Boy". He attained his A-levels at The Oxford School of Learning, and studied Property Development at Kingston University. His sister Francesca, a 19-year-old student ballerina, died in the Marchioness disaster in 1989.

In 1985, as a 12-year-old chorister in the King's House School choir, Dallaglio and 20 other choristers sang backing vocals on the song "We Don't Need Another Hero" by Tina Turner. This only became known in 2005, when the Musicians' Union, having realised that the choristers had not been paid royalties on the record, attempted to track them down. As part of the same choir, Dallaglio sang at the wedding of composer Andrew Lloyd Webber.

Because Dallaglio's father, Vincenzo, is Italian, and his English-born mother, Eileen, was of Irish descent he was eligible to play for both Italy and Ireland, as well as England, and in the early 1990s he turned down an invitation to play for Ireland.

== Club career ==
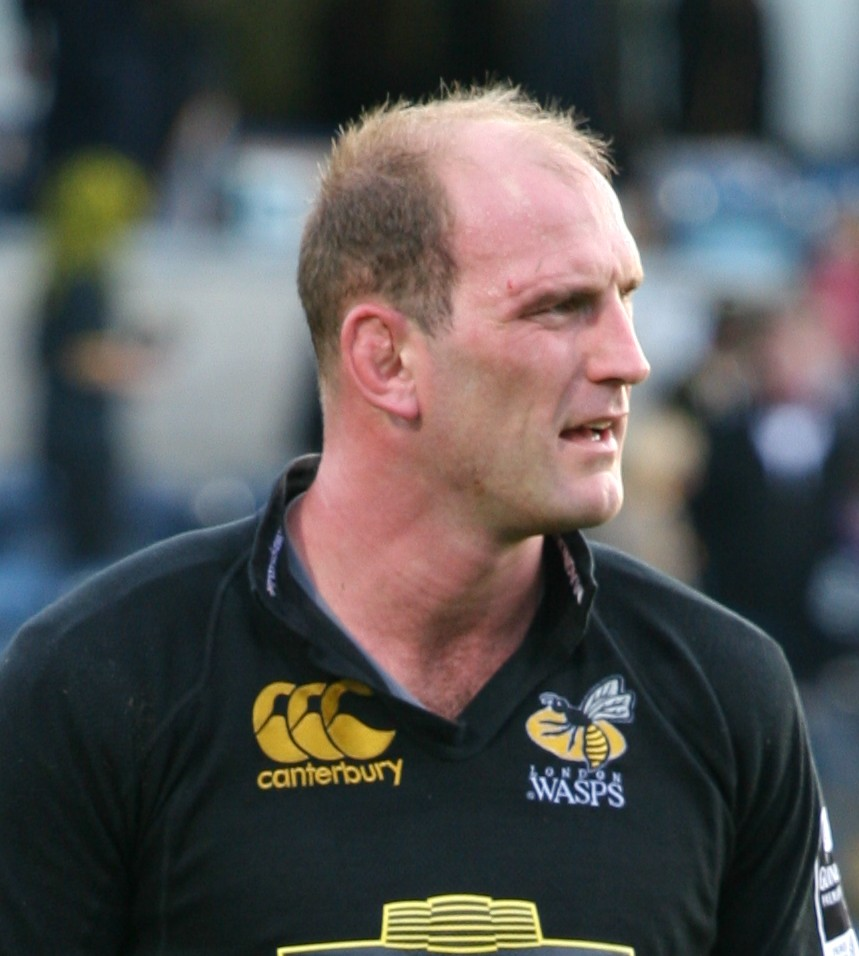
Dallaglio in 2006

Dallaglio had a good season in 1999–2000, when he regained the club captaincy. Although Wasps' league form was disappointing, he led them to the quarter-finals of the Heineken Cup and to a second successive Tetley's Bitter Cup victory.

Dallaglio returned from an ankle injury early in the 2006–07 domestic season to reclaim the club captaincy at Wasps, but an indifferent Guinness Premiership season ended with them failing to qualify for the play-offs for the first time since the introduction of the knockout system. Dallaglio and his teammates saved their best performances for the Heineken Cup; he led the club to its second European championship win on 20 May 2007. The final, played at Twickenham, set a world record for the highest attendance figure for a club rugby match (at around 82,000). Wasps' opponents, Leicester Tigers had already won the EDF Energy Cup and the Guinness Premiership trophies and were favourites to achieve an unprecedented Treble, especially as they had beaten Wasps 40–26 at Welford Road less than a month earlier, but Wasps won the game, 25–9.

In the following season he joined London Wasps late because of the Rugby World Cup. He returned to find London Wasps struggling near the bottom of the Guinness Premiership. Wasps' fortunes quickly changed; they made it through the group in the EDF Cup, and started climbing up the table. they narrowly failed to make it out of their Heineken Cup group. They lost out to Munster, the eventual winners, but could have qualified if they had beaten them away in their final pool game.

They soon hit top form in the Premiership; they reached the play-offs and drew a home match against Bath. They won the game 21-6, but lost rising star Danny Cipriani to an injury. Leicester Tigers beat Gloucester to qualify for the Premiership final. This match was to be Dallaglio's last match, and it was to be played in front of a capacity crowd of 81,600 at Twickenham. They were made to fight, but eventually won 26-16. Dallaglio later said it was Wasps' greatest Premiership title, noting the damaging effect the Rugby World Cup had on their squad. In the 67th minute of the Premiership final, Dallaglio was substituted, and received a standing ovation from the crowd.

Dallaglio made a sly appearance, at blindside flanker, for London Wasps "A" Team in the Guinness A League on 8 September 2008. He was getting game time before he captained an England XV for the Help For Heroes game at Twickenham on 20 September later that month.

== International career ==
Dallaglio was a member of the inaugural World Cup Sevens-winning squad with England in 1993.

He was then a surprise choice for the 1994 England tour to South Africa. Yet the following winter he was not guaranteed a place in Wasps' back-row. He made his debut for England in November 1995 as a substitute against the Springboks and toured South Africa as a member of the 1997 British & Irish Lions squad. He was given the England captaincy in the autumn of 1997 by new coach Clive Woodward, taking over from Phil de Glanville. The other candidate for the job, Martin Johnson, had led the Lions tour, but Dallaglio was preferred.

=== 2003 Rugby World Cup ===
After another strong season in 2000–01, he was selected for his second Lions tour, but an injury in the last game of the domestic season, against Bath, meant he was doubtful for the trip to Australia. The Lions passed him fit but the knee gave way in a mid-week match, cutting short his tour and forcing him to undergo reconstructive surgery.

Dallaglio was a key member of England's 2003 Grand Slam and World Cup-winning side, being the only player to play in every minute of England's World Cup campaign. With the World Cup win, he became one of the two players – the other being England scrum half Matt Dawson – to have won the World Cup in both the 15- and 7-a-side competitions.

Dallaglio was re-appointed as captain after Martin Johnson retired. In August 2004, Dallaglio announced his retirement from the national team due to "the brutal demands of international rugby" but after being selected for the 2005 British & Irish Lions tour to New Zealand he changed his mind and made himself available for international selection again.

He regained the captaincy in 2004 after Johnson's retirement from international rugby, but without Johnson the team played poorly, and Dallaglio announced his retirement from international rugby on 31 August 2004.

Despite his international retirement, Dallaglio was called up for his third Lions tour in 2005 but he fractured his ankle during the first tour match, against Bay of Plenty on 4 June, and did not play again during the tour.

=== 2007 Rugby World Cup ===
At the end of 2005, Dallaglio announced that he was making himself available again for England selection and he was included in the squad for the 2006 Six Nations Championship. He was named on the bench for England's opening match of the tournament against Wales on 4 February at Twickenham. He was a blood replacement for clubmate Joe Worsley after 13 minutes and on 64 minutes was a replacement for Martin Corry, touching down with a clinically executed charge from the back of the scrum on 70 minutes. He gained three more caps off the bench during the tournament, but did not play in the last game of the championship, when England lost 28–24 to Ireland.

Dallaglio continued to play for England, especially in the number eight position, forming – with Neil Back and Richard Hill – the Hill, Back, Dallaglio back-row trio affectionately nicknamed the Holy Trinity.

On 15 June 2007, Dallaglio was one of 47 players chosen by England coach Brian Ashton to attend a pre-World Cup training camp and he was later named in the 30-man World Cup squad, alongside Joe Worsley and Jason Robinson, who were also veterans of England's 2003 Rugby World Cup success. Dallaglio said "The fans can expect this England team to give absolutely everything and play with an enormous amount of passion and pride."

England started poorly in the tournament, with an unconvincing 28–10 victory over the United States and a 36–0 loss to eventual champions South Africa. Dallaglio started the first game at number eight, but was dropped for the South Africa match in favour of Nick Easter, who became first choice for the rest of the tournament. Following the loss to South Africa, England began to improve steadily and, against most expectations, reached the final, where they lost a closely fought game. The improvement in performance was credited to the influence of a number of senior players, including Dallaglio (who made a number of appearances off the bench) and Mike Catt.

Soon after the World Cup tournament, Dallaglio and Catt each published an autobiography that was serialised in a major newspaper. Both players were highly critical of coach Brian Ashton's performance. Many commentators questioned the wisdom of making public criticisms so soon after the tournament and Dallaglio later issued a clarification and partial apology.

== Captaincy ==
Warren Gatland has said that Dallaglio was "The best captain that I’ve ever been involved with."

== Retirement ==
On 3 January 2008, Dallaglio announced that he was retiring from international rugby with immediate effect and from domestic rugby at the end of the current season; he also stated that he would like to take up coaching in the future. At the end to his career, Wasps won the 2008 Premiership Final on 31 May 2008 in front of a capacity crowd of 81,600 at Twickenham, then a world rugby union record attendance for a club match.

== Drugs scandal ==
On 24 May 1999 Dallaglio resigned as England's rugby union captain following allegations in the News of the World that he had used and been a dealer in hard drugs, including cocaine and ecstasy. The newspaper also reported that Dallaglio had boasted about taking drugs at a party during the Lions tour to South Africa, in 1997.

Dallaglio "categorically denied" the newspaper's claim that he had dealt in drugs and said he had been the victim of "an elaborate set-up". In response, News of the World editor Phil Hall said: "We stand by our story. Lawrence Dallaglio is damned in his own words and, frankly, we are amazed at his denial."

England coach Clive Woodward, who was one of a panel of senior Rugby Football Union (RFU) officials who met Dallaglio to investigate the matter, said he was "bitterly disappointed" for the player and his family but was confident he would be "proved innocent". The RFU undertook their own investigation to assess the veracity of the claims and Leicester lock and British & Irish Lions skipper Martin Johnson was appointed to replace Dallaglio as England captain. Dallaglio was later fined £15,000 plus costs by the RFU for the incident.

== Post-retirement ==
Dallaglio was an analyst for ITV's coverage of the 2011 Rugby World Cup. He co-commentated with Nick Mullins in the semi-final between Australia and New Zealand. He followed this up with a similar role in 2015.

== Charitable work ==
Dallaglio captained the Help for Heroes XV at a charity match in Twickenham. The side, which included former England Internationals Will Greenwood, Jason Robinson and former England Team Manager Martin Johnson, defeated the International XV led by former Wales captain Scott Gibbs. Dallaglio ended the match by kicking the final conversion, bringing the score to 29–10. In front of a 52,254-strong crowd at Twickenham the game raised approximately £1.3 million for Help for Heroes.

Following the success of his testimonial year, Dallaglio set himself the challenge of raising half a million pounds for charity, and with help and support from colleagues, friends and family the total ended up being over a million pounds, which was contributed to various charitable causes.

In summer 2008, he cycled 933 km across the Pyrenees as part of a team of 30 cyclists, raising £435,000 for Bliss, the special care baby charity. Starting out in Biarritz and finishing in Banyuls, he was joined by former rugby union footballer Damian Hopley and ski expert Warren Smith.

After his mother Eileen died of cancer in 2008, Lawrence set up Dallaglio RugbyWorks in 2009.

Rugbyworks' inaugural event 8 Rocks 2009 raised over £600,000. The charity expanded significantly and made close to £10 million in total by 2013. In 2011 Dallaglio wanted to redefine the focus of the charity, and created a social inclusion programme. Dallaglio RugbyWorks is an intensive, long-term skills development programme based on rugby, through which the aim is to get teenagers who have been excluded from mainstream education into sustained education, employment or training.

In February 2010, Dallaglio embarked on a bicycle ride from Rome to Edinburgh during the RBS 6 Nations Championship to raise money for Sport Relief and Dallaglio RugbyWorks. The Dallaglio Cycle Slam took place over the course of a month, seeing a team, including former Arsenal FC and England football international Lee Dixon cycling through all of the RBS 6 Nations countries, taking in each of the international rugby stadia along the way. The aim was to raise £1 million, net proceeds of which were split equally between Sport Relief and the newly formed Dallaglio RugbyWorks, whose beneficiaries include Cancer Research UK, DebRA, Leukaemia Research, Help for Heroes and the RPA Benevolent Fund.

In 2012, Dallaglio joined forces with former England cricketer Andrew Flintoff for the Dallaglio Flintoff Cycle Slam 2012. They were joined by former footballers Lee Dixon and Graeme Le Saux, and a number of other celebrities and members of the public in a bid to cycle from Olympia in Greece, covering 521 km to the Olympic stadium in Stratford, London. The Dallaglio Flintoff Cycle Slam 2012 raised over two million pounds for Cancer Research UK and Great Ormond Street Hospital via Dallaglio RugbyWorks and the AF Foundation with a portion of the money raised going to Virgin Unite, Virgin’s non-profit arm.

In 2014, Dallaglio led the third Dallaglio Cycle Slam from Treviso in Italy cycling over 2,300 km to Twickenham Stadium. The challenge raised over £650,000 for Dallaglio RugbyWorks and Teenage Cancer Trust.

In 2016, Dallaglio was joined by 160 riders from San Sebastien to Andorra, Barcelona, Majorca and Ibiza, over 2,000 km. The event raised over £1 million for Dallaglio RugbyWorks.

In 2018, 300 cyclists including rugby player Austin Healey, Andrew Ridgeley from Wham! and actor John Hannah also participated in the Dallaglio Cycle Slam.

== Personal life ==
Dallaglio married his long-time girlfriend, Alice, in 2005. They have two daughters, Ella and Josie, and a son, Enzo. Alice is the daughter of Lydia Corbett, formerly known as Sylvette David, a famous model of Pablo Picasso.

Appointed a Member of the Order of the British Empire (MBE) in the 2004 New Year Honours for services to rugby union, he was promoted to Officer of the Order of the British Empire (OBE) in the 2008 Birthday Honours for services to rugby and to charity.

He has also received an Honorary Doctorate from Buckinghamshire New University for services to sport. The Doctorate was conferred on 12 September 2008.

In September 2026, it was reported that Dallaglio had divorced, and been declared bankrupt. As a result of his financial problems, Dallaglio put memorabilia from his career up for auction.

== Honours ==
Wasps

- Premiership 1996–97, 2002–03, 2003–04, 2004–05, 2007–08
- Powergen Cup 1998–99, 1999–00, 2005–06
- Heineken Cup 2003–04, 2006–07
- Parker Pen Challenge Cup 2002–03

England

- Six Nations Championship:
  - Winner (4): 1996, 2000, 2001, 2003
- Grand Slam:
  - Winner (1): 2003
- Triple Crown:
  - Winner (5): 1996, 1997, 1998, 2002, 2003
- World Cup:
  - Winner (1): 2003
- World Cup Sevens:
  - Winner (1): 1993

Lions

- South Africa 1997
- Australia 2001
- New Zealand 2005

World Rugby Hall of Fame

- Inducted in 2016

== See also ==
- List of top English points scorers and try scorers

== Bibliography ==
- Dallaglio, Lawrence (2007). It's in the Blood: My Life. Headline. ISBN 978-0-7553-1573-4.
- Dallaglio, Lawrence (1998). Dallaglio on Rugby: Know the Modern Game. Hodder & Stoughton. ISBN 0-340-71839-0.

Sporting positions
Preceded by Phil de Glanville	England national rugby union team captain Nov 1997-Apr 1998	Succeeded by Tony Diprose
Preceded by Martin Johnson	England national rugby union team captain Nov 1998-Apr 1999	Succeeded by Martin Johnson
Preceded by Martin Johnson	England national rugby union team captain Feb-Jun 2004	Succeeded by Jason Robinson
