= The Savage Nomads =

British indie rock band

The Savage Nomads are a British five piece indie rock band from South London, consisting of Cole Salewicz (lead vocals) Josh Miles (guitar, vocals and production), Benjy Miles (guitar), Tom Williams (bass guitar and vocals) and Louis Lacoste (drums and vocals). Q magazine described them as "one of the most glorious bands to come out of South London." The band have received acclaim for their exploratory sound and energetic live shows.

== History ==
=== Beginnings and What The Angel Said ===
Formed in 2008, the band's first shows were with Mick Jones of The Clash at his Carbon Casino. They played with other bands such as Alabama 3, Kitty, Daisy & Lewis, The Rotten Hill Gang, Carbon/Silicon, John Cooper Clarke, Pete Wylie and James Dean Bradfield of The Manic Street Preachers. Singer Cole Salewicz has stated that these "early shows were a vital catalyst that cemented our confidence"; following a further four shows with Carbon Casino, the band started a residency at Denmark Street's 12 Bar. The original lineup consisted of Cole Salewicz (guitar and vocals), Joe Gilick (guitar), Josh Miles (Bass) and Billy Boone (Drums).

After two years on the London gigging circuit, the band were signed to Alaska Sounds in 2010 and soon after released their debut EP What The Angel Said in October of that year. The EP was produced by Pat Collier formerly of The Vibrators and received airplay from Gideon Coe and Don Letts on BBC Radio 6 Music, and Gary Crowley on BBC London.

=== Coloured Clutter ===
In 2011, prior to the release of their debut album the band supported Mick Jones' Big Audio Dynamite on their comeback tour. Coloured Clutter was released by Alaska Sounds in 2011, it was called by Artrocker magazine, a long-standing supporter of the band, "the best debut album from a British band this year". It received positive reviews with Q magazine describing the band as "defining experimental. The Savage Nomads are named after one of the most notorious street gangs ever to come out of the Bronx area of NYC - they are also one of the most glorious bands to come out of South London." In support of the album the band would later team up with Jones, Pete Wylie and Primal Scream, opening up for them on The Justice Tonight Tour - a benefit for the Hillsborough football disaster in 1989 and also opened up for The Members and Rat Scabies as well as The Jim Jones Revue on several tour dates.

=== Tension In The Middle ===
The band released Tension In The Middle on 27 May 2012. It received regular airplay on BBC Radio 6 Music and was called by BBC Introducing's Tom Robinson as "the most astonishing single of the year so far". The video was directed by Jarrad Templeton which also received praise: "Stunning photography, rich colours and a slowly unfolding narrative". The band were in residence at Alan McGee's former club night Death2Disco at The Notting Hill Arts Club in West London for a series of shows throughout 2012.

=== New line-up and Jaded Edges ===
Following a prolonged hiatus, it was announced Gilick was leaving The Savage Nomads, with Miles moving onto play guitar, and following younger brother Benjy joining playing guitar. Salewicz and the Miles brothers worked on writing new material, resulting in 25 new songs. Rory 'Tyrone' Jones joined the band having met Salewicz at an Only Real gig at The Shackelwell Arms. Following auditions, Petr Matousek replaced Boone, moving to England having completed university in Prague to commit full-time to the band. With a comeback show at The Hoxton Bar & Kitchen in June as part of The Artrocker New Blood Festival, the band released their come back single Jaded Edges in September 2013, announced as the first of a new series of singles to be released over the next year. Following a series of further London shows, the band released the single along with a video on YouTube, again directed by Templeton. The single received critical acclaim with Tom Robinson playlisting the track on his Fresh On The Net blog, Gary Crowley announcing it his 'Crowley Cracker' on his Amazing Radio show and Artrocker magazine calling it "possibly the strongest indie pop of the year". Radio One have also played the single with Jen Long calling it 'Big Indie'. BBC Introducing included Jaded Edges in their best of 2013 hour on BBC London The band are planning upcoming shows and future releases for early 2014.

== Discography ==
=== Albums ===
- Coloured Clutter (July 2011)

=== EPs ===
- What The Angel Said (October 2010)
- Tension In The Middle (May 2012)

=== Singles ===
- "The Magic Eye" (May 2011)
- "What The Angel Said" (October 2011)
- "Jaded Edges" (September 2013)
