= List of UK Rock & Metal Singles Chart number ones of 1999 =

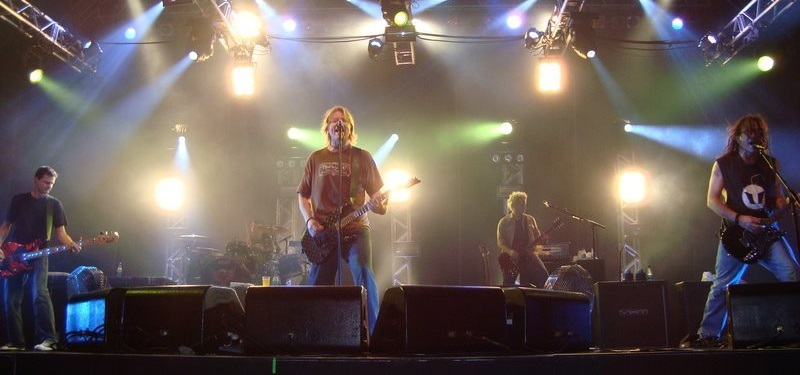
"Why Don't You Get a Job?" by The Offspring was the longest-running number one of 1999, spending eleven weeks atop the chart. The band also spent three weeks at number one with "She's Got Issues".

The UK Rock & Metal Singles Chart is a record chart which ranks the best-selling rock and heavy metal songs in the United Kingdom. Compiled and published by the Official Charts Company, the data is based on each track's weekly physical sales, digital downloads and streams. In 1999, there were 14 singles that topped the 52 published charts. The first number-one of the year was Resurrection, an extended play by American industrial metal band Fear Factory, which spent the last two weeks of 1998 and the first week of 1999 at number one. The final number-one single of the year was "She's Got Issues" by American pop punk band The Offspring.

The most successful song on the UK Rock & Metal Singles Chart in 1999 was "Why Don't You Get a Job?" by The Offspring, which spent a total of eleven weeks at number one. The band also topped the chart for four weeks with "She's Got Issues". "Why Does It Always Rain on Me?" by Travis spent ten weeks at number one, while "November Rain" by Guns N' Roses was number one for six weeks over two three-week spells. Def Leppard were number one for five weeks in 1999 with "Promises" (three weeks) and "Goodbye" (two weeks); Skunk Anansie's "Charlie Big Potato" and Rage Against the Machine's "Guerrilla Radio" spent four weeks each at number one; Bon Jovi's "Real Life" was number one for three weeks; and Metallica spent three weeks at number one with "The Unforgiven II" (one week) and "Whiskey in the Jar" (two weeks).

== Chart history ==
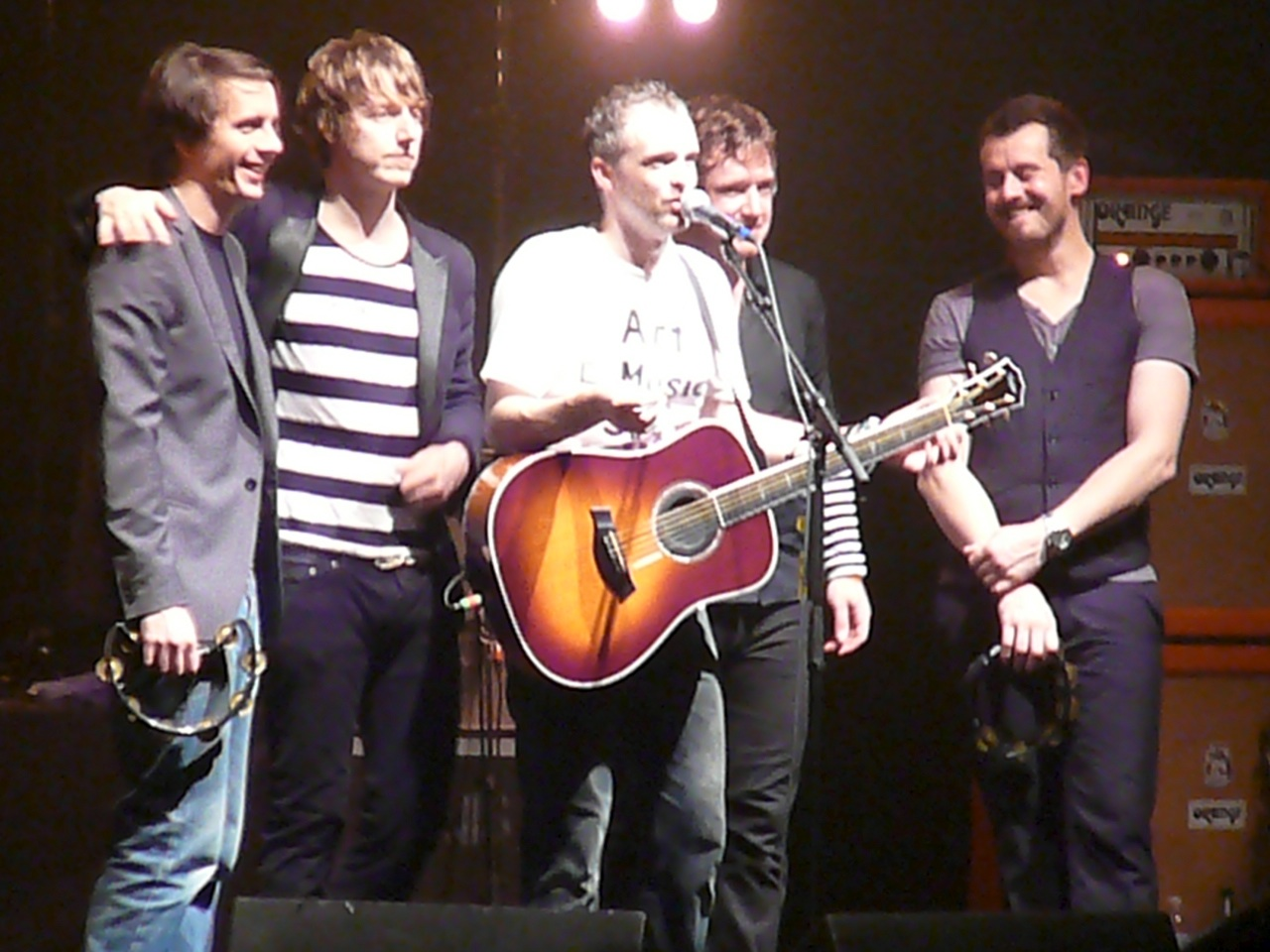
Travis spent ten weeks at number one with "Why Does It Always Rain on Me?"

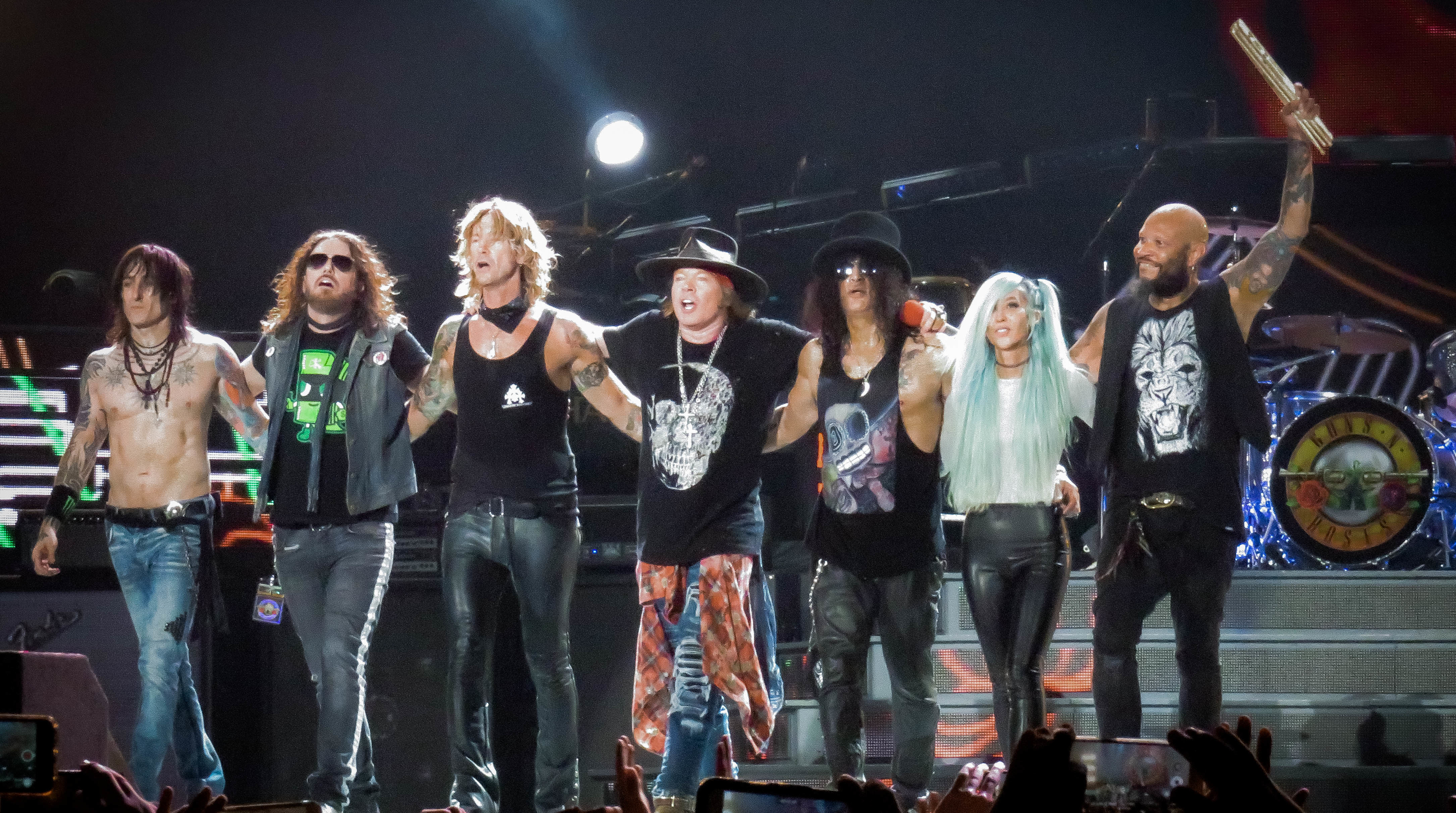
"November Rain" by Guns N' Roses was number one for six weeks in 1999.

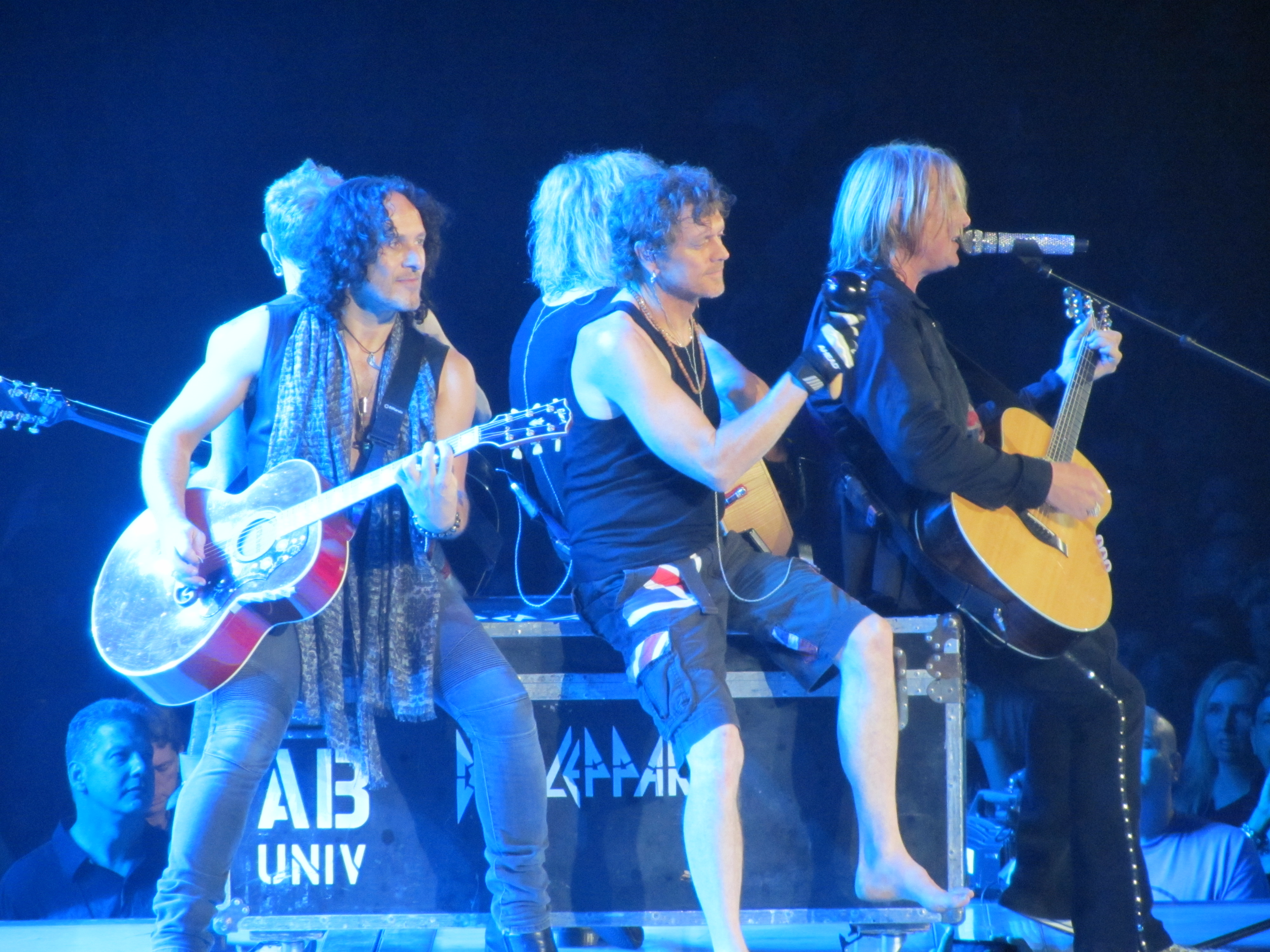
Def Leppard topped the chart with "Promises" and "Goodbye" in 1999.

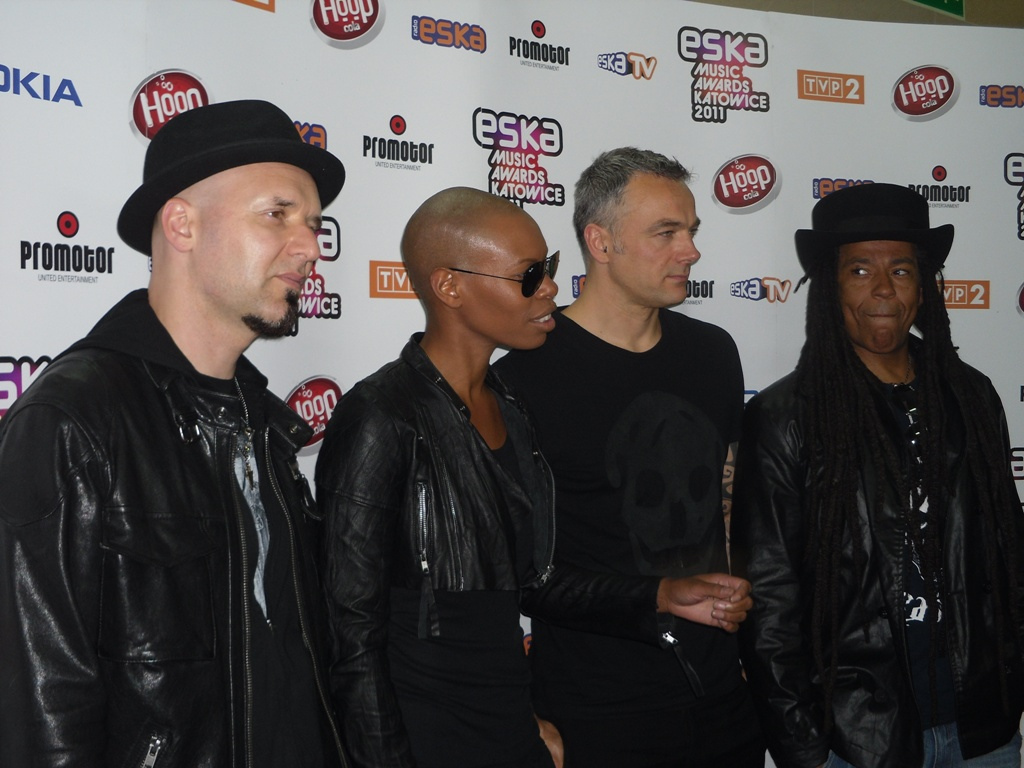
Skunk Anansie spent four weeks at number one with "Charlie Big Potato".

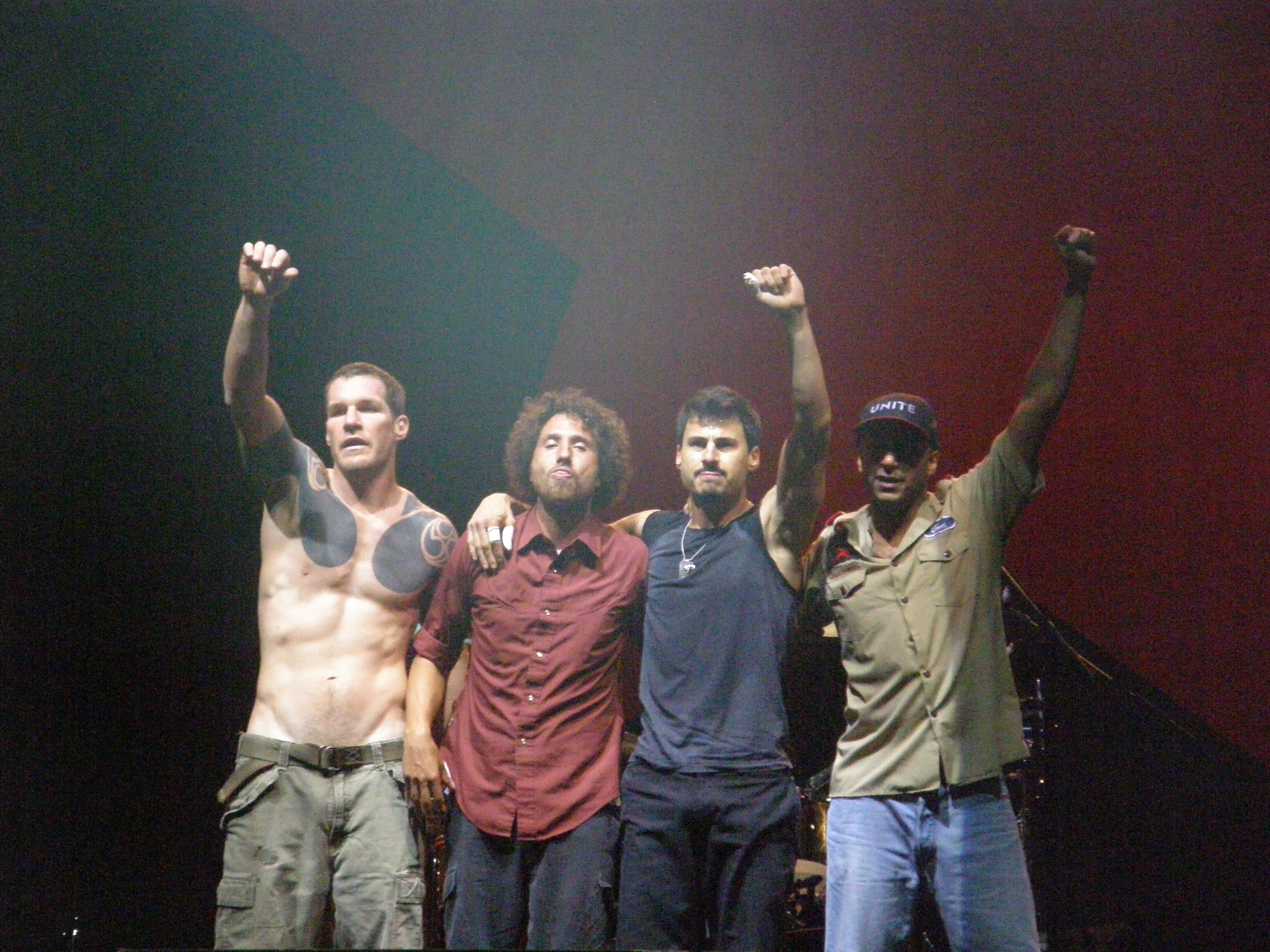
Rage Against the Machine's "Guerrilla Radio" was number one for four weeks.

Issue date	Single	Artist(s)	Record label(s)	Ref.
2 January	"Resurrection"	Fear Factory	Roadrunner	
9 January	"November Rain"	Guns N' Roses	Geffen	
16 January	"November Rain"	Guns N' Roses	Geffen	
23 January	"November Rain"	Guns N' Roses	Geffen	
30 January	"The Unforgiven II"	Metallica	Vertigo	
6 February	"November Rain"	Guns N' Roses	Geffen	
13 February	"November Rain"	Guns N' Roses	Geffen	
20 February	"November Rain"	Guns N' Roses	Geffen	
27 February	"Whiskey in the Jar"	Metallica	Vertigo	
6 March	"Whiskey in the Jar"	Metallica	Vertigo	
13 March	"Charlie Big Potato"	Skunk Anansie	Virgin	
20 March	"Charlie Big Potato"	Skunk Anansie	Virgin	
27 March	"Charlie Big Potato"	Skunk Anansie	Virgin	
3 April	"Charlie Big Potato"	Skunk Anansie	Virgin	
10 April	"Real Life"	Bon Jovi	Reprise	
17 April	"Real Life"	Bon Jovi	Reprise	
24 April	"Real Life"	Bon Jovi	Reprise	
1 May	"Baby Britain"	Elliott Smith	DreamWorks	
8 May	"Why Don't You Get a Job?"	The Offspring	Columbia	
15 May	"Why Don't You Get a Job?"	The Offspring	Columbia	
22 May	"Why Don't You Get a Job?"	The Offspring	Columbia	
29 May	"Why Don't You Get a Job?"	The Offspring	Columbia	
5 June	"Why Don't You Get a Job?"	The Offspring	Columbia	
12 June	"Why Don't You Get a Job?"	The Offspring	Columbia	
19 June	"Why Don't You Get a Job?"	The Offspring	Columbia	
26 June	"Why Don't You Get a Job?"	The Offspring	Columbia	
3 July	"Why Don't You Get a Job?"	The Offspring	Columbia	
10 July	"Why Don't You Get a Job?"	The Offspring	Columbia	
17 July	"Why Don't You Get a Job?"	The Offspring	Columbia	
24 July	"Promises"	Def Leppard	Bludgeon Riffola	
31 July	"Promises"	Def Leppard	Bludgeon Riffola	
7 August	"Promises"	Def Leppard	Bludgeon Riffola	
14 August	"Why Does It Always Rain on Me?"	Travis	Independiente	
21 August	"Why Does It Always Rain on Me?"	Travis	Independiente	
28 August	"Why Does It Always Rain on Me?"	Travis	Independiente	
4 September	"Why Does It Always Rain on Me?"	Travis	Independiente	
11 September	"Why Does It Always Rain on Me?"	Travis	Independiente	
18 September	"Why Does It Always Rain on Me?"	Travis	Independiente	
25 September	"Why Does It Always Rain on Me?"	Travis	Independiente	
2 October	"Why Does It Always Rain on Me?"	Travis	Independiente	
9 October	"Goodbye"	Def Leppard	Bludgeon Riffola	
16 October	"Goodbye"	Def Leppard	Bludgeon Riffola	
23 October	"Why Does It Always Rain on Me?"	Travis	Independiente	
30 October	"Why Does It Always Rain on Me?"	Travis	Independiente	
6 November	"Guerrilla Radio"	Rage Against the Machine	Epic	
13 November	"Guerrilla Radio"	Rage Against the Machine	Epic	
20 November	"Guerrilla Radio"	Rage Against the Machine	Epic	
27 November	"Guerrilla Radio"	Rage Against the Machine	Epic	
4 December	"She's Got Issues"	The Offspring	Columbia	
11 December	"She's Got Issues"	The Offspring	Columbia	
18 December	"From This Day"	Machine Head	Roadrunner	
25 December	"She's Got Issues"	The Offspring	Columbia	

== See also ==
- 1999 in British music
- List of UK Rock & Metal Albums Chart number ones of 1999
