= Jesse Wood =

American-born British musician (born 1976)

- Born: Jesse James Wood; 30 October 1976 (age 49); Malibu, California, U.S.
- Origin: London, England
- Genres: Alternative rock, electronic rock, indie rock
- Occupations: Musician, songwriter
- Instruments: Guitar, bass guitar
- Years active: 1988–present
- Labels: Dissention Records, Artist Management
- Formerly of: RedRacer, Reef, The Leah Wood Band, Glyda, The Ronnie Wood Band, Willis and Willing, The Black Swan Effect
- Spouse(s): Tilly Wood (m. 2003, divorced) Fearne Cotton (m. 2014; sep. 2024)

Jesse James Wood (born 30 October 1976) is an American-born British musician. He plays guitar and bass guitar.

Wood is the son of The Rolling Stones musician Ronnie Wood and Krissy Findlay, who died of an accidental drug overdose in June 2005. He attended King's House School and Ibstock Place School in Roehampton, south-west London.

Wood has previously played with Glyda, The Leah Wood Band, The Ronnie Wood Band, Wills and the Willing, HOGG, and The Black Swan Effect. He joined the band Carbon/Silicon in June 2010. In 2014, Wood joined two friends, John Hogg and Sean Genockey, in the band RedRacer. He joined Reef in April 2014.

Wood is also a model. His work includes a Yohji Yamamoto fragrance campaign and Liam Gallagher's Pretty Green clothing label. In December 2014, Wood was featured in British GQ "My Style" page.

Wood has been married twice. He has two children from his first marriage to Tilly Wood, whom he married in 2003.

Wood began dating TV presenter Fearne Cotton in 2011. On 21 February 2013, Cotton gave birth to a son. The couple were engaged in December that year and married on 4 July 2014. On 9 September 2015 it was announced that Cotton had given birth to their daughter. On 13 December 2024, Cotton announced she and Wood were separating.

He lives in Richmond, London.
