= Glow (Reef album) =

Studio album by Reef
- Released: 27 January 1997
- Genres: Britpop, indie rock, alternative rock
- Length: 50:35
- Label: Sony Soho Square
- Producers: George Drakoulias, Reef

Reef chronology
Replenish (1995)	Glow (1997)	Rides (1999)

Singles from Glow
- 1. "Place Your Hands" Released: 21 October 1996; 2. "Come Back Brighter" Released: 13 January 1997; 3. "Consideration" Released: 24 March 1997; 4. "Yer Old" Released: 21 July 1997

Glow is the second studio album by English rock band Reef. Produced by the band and George Drakoulias, the album was released on 27 January 1997 through Sony Soho Square and supported by the singles "Place Your Hands", "Come Back Brighter", "Consideration" and "Yer Old". Glow reached number one on the UK Albums Chart.

== Recording ==
Glow was produced by George Drakoulias and the band; Jim Scott handled recording for nearly every track bar "Don't You Like It?", "Higher Vibration" and "Yer Old", which were done by Richard Digby Smith. Scott mixed almost every songs, except for "Don't You Like It?" (which was done by Sylvia Massy) and "Yer Old" (done by Smith). Stephen Marcussen then mastered the album at Precision Mastering.

== Reception ==
Professional ratings
Review scores
Source	Rating
AllMusic	4/5 stars
NME	7/10

In a retrospective assessment, Stephen Thomas Erlewine of music website AllMusic claimed that the album was "more focused and better than its predecessor [Replenish]" and describing it as "inspired" and "terrific". Rock music magazine Kerrang! ranked the album third on their 1997 "Albums of the Year" list.

== Track listing ==
All songs by Reef, all lyrics by Gary Stringer.

No.	Title	Length
1.	"Place Your Hands"	3:37
2.	"I Would Have Left You"	4:23
3.	"Summer's in Bloom"	3:46
4.	"Lately Stomping"	2:44
5.	"Consideration"	5:42
6.	"Don't You Like It?"	4:14
7.	"Come Back Brighter"	3:31
8.	"Higher Vibration"	3:52
9.	"I'm Not Scared"	5:03
10.	"Robot Riff"	7:12
11.	"Yer Old"	3:18
12.	"Lullaby"	3:13

Enhanced edition (Epic EK 67971)
No.	Title	Length
13.	"Naked" (music video)
14.	"Place Your Hands" (music video)
15.	"Consideration" (music video)
16.	"Come Back Brighter" (music video)

Deluxe edition bonus disc (486940 6)
No.	Title	Length
1.	"Place Your Hands" (live)	3:44
2.	"Summer's in Bloom" (live)	3:44
3.	"Lately Stomping" (live)	3:06
4.	"Yer Old" (live)	3:20
5.	"Yer Old" (music video)	3:18
6.	"Place Your Hands" (live video)	3:44
7.	"Summer's in Bloom" (live video)	3:44
8.	"Lately Stomping" (live video)	3:06
Total length:		27:46

== Personnel ==
Personnel per booklet.

Reef

- Jack Bessant – bass
- Dominic Greensmith – drums
- Kenwyn House – guitar
- Gary Stringer – vocals

Additional musicians

- Benmont Tench – keyboards
- Chris Trujillo – percussion

Production and design

- George Drakoulias – producer
- Reef – producer
- Brett Finn - R & A
- Jim Scott – recording (all except tracks 6, 8 and 11), mixing (all except tracks 6 and 11)
- Richard Digby Smith – recording (tracks 6, 8 and 11), mixing (track 11)
- Sylvia Massy – mixing (track 6)
- Stephen Marcussen – mastering
- Paul Cohen – photography

== Charts ==
Chart performance for Glow
Chart (1997)	Peak position
Australian Albums (ARIA)	18
Dutch Albums (Album Top 100)	74
Finnish Albums (Suomen virallinen lista)	38
New Zealand Albums (RMNZ)	12
UK Albums (Official Charts)	1

== Certifications ==
Region	Certification	Certified units/sales
Australia (ARIA)	Gold	35,000^{^}
United Kingdom (BPI)	Platinum	300,000^{*}
^{*} Sales figures based on certification alone.^{^} Shipments figures based on certification alone.
