= Replenish (album) =

Studio album by Reef
- Released: 19 June 1995
- Genre: Alternative rock, funk rock, blues rock
- Length: 40:49
- Label: Sony Soho Square
- Producer: Reef, Clive Martin

Reef chronology
Replenish (1995)	Glow (1997)

Singles from Replenish
- 1. "Good Feeling" Released: 3 April 1995; 2. "Naked" Released: 22 May 1995

Replenish is the debut studio album by British alternative rock band Reef. Produced by the band and Clive Martin, the album was released on 19 June 1995 supported by the singles "Good Feeling" and "Naked". Replenish peaked at number nine on the UK Albums Chart.

== Reception ==
Professional ratings
Review scores
Source	Rating
AllMusic	3/5 stars
NME	6/10
Select	3/5 medals

AllMusic gave the album three out of five stars, while rock magazine Kerrang! ranked the album tenth on their 1995 "Albums of the Year" list.

== Track listing ==
All lyrics are written by Gary Stringer ("Choose to Live" lyrics co-written by Jack Bessant); all music is composed by Reef.

No.	Title	Length
1.	"Feed Me"	3:44
2.	"Naked"	3:10
3.	"Good Feeling"	3:47
4.	"Repulsive"	5:12
5.	"Mellow"	3:05
6.	"Together"	3:57
7.	"Replenish"	3:43
8.	"Choose to Live"	6:32
9.	"Comfort"	3:12
10.	"Loose"	2:56
11.	"End (lasts 1:31, followed by hidden track "Reprise")"	4:16

== Personnel ==
Reef personnel

- Gary Stringer – vocals
- Kenwyn House – guitar
- Jack Bessant – bass, acoustic guitar, backing vocals
- Dominic Greensmith– drums

Additional personnel

- Clive Martin – production, mixing
- Paul Cohen – design, photography

== Charts ==
Chart performance for Replenish
Chart (1995–1996)	Peak position
Australian Albums (ARIA)	80
UK Albums (OCC)	9

== Certifications ==
Region	Certification	Certified units/sales
United Kingdom (BPI)	Gold	100,000^{*}
^{*} Sales figures based on certification alone.
