= Getaway (Reef album) =

Studio album by Reef
- Released: 18 August 2000
- Studios: ICP Recording Studios, Brussels; The Church, Crouch End, London
- Genre: Rock
- Length: 42:24
- Label: Sony
- Producer: Alistair Clay

Reef chronology
Rides (1999)	Getaway (2000)	Together (2003)

Singles from Getaway
- 1. "Set the Record Straight" Released: 31 July 2000; 2. "Superhero" Released: 4 December 2000; 3. "All I Want" Released: 7 May 2001

Professional ratings
Review scores
Source	Rating
Yahoo!	3.5/5 stars
NME	7/10

Getaway is the fourth album by English rock band Reef, released in 2000.

== Track listing ==
All music composed by Reef; all lyrics composed by Gary Stringer, except where noted.

1. "Set the Record Straight" – 3:55
2. "Superhero" – 3:07
3. "Getaway" – 3:49
4. "Solid" – 3:53
5. "All I Want" (lyrics: Dominic Greensmith) – 4:18
6. "Hold On" – 3:11
7. "Saturday" – 4:05
8. "Won't You Listen?" – 3:52
9. "Levels" – 5:09
10. "Pretenders" – 3:48
11. "I Do Not Know What They Will Do" – 3:12

== Singles ==
- "Set The Record Straight" #19 UK
- "Superhero" #55 UK
- "All I Want" #51 UK

== Personnel ==
=== Reef ===
- Gary Stringer – vocals, guitar
- Kenwyn House – guitar
- Jack Bessant – bass
- Dominic Greensmith – drums

=== Other personnel ===
- Alistair Clay – producer, engineer, mixing
- Delores Lewis – additional vocals, keyboards
- Jason Knight – keyboards
- Christopher Allan – cello
- Ben Castle – saxophone
- Matthew Ward – violin
- Nell Catchpole – violin
- Duncan McKay, Paul Newton, Jerry Hey – trumpet
- Nichol Thomson – trombone
- Alex Clark – Pro Tools engineering
- Rick Guest – photography
- David Sims – portrait photography

== Charts ==
Chart performance for Getaway
Chart (2000)	Peak position
Australian Albums (ARIA)	63
UK Albums (Official Charts)	15
