= Place Your Hands =

1996 single by Reef

Single by Reef

from the album Glow
- Released: 21 October 1996
- Length: 3:37
- Label: Sony Soho Square
- Songwriter: Reef
- Producers: Reef, George Drakoulias

Reef singles chronology
"Weird" (1995)	"Place Your Hands" (1996)	"Come Back Brighter" (1997)

"Place Your Hands" is a song recorded by British band Reef. It was released on 21 October 1996 by Sony Soho Square, as the first single from the band's second album, Glow (1997). The song peaked at number six on the UK Singles Chart and is Reef’s most successful single to date, and also their best known hit. The accompanying music video was directed by David Mould.

== Background ==
The song explains the grief that vocalist Gary Stringer felt following the death of his grandfather, and easing the pain of death.

It established the band's popularity, appealing both to the then-current tendency for "laddishness" and to older rock fans. In the USA, it owed much of its success to young cable music channel M2, which played the video heavily and led to it becoming a "Buzz Clip" on the main MTV channel. In turn, the song provided a major boost for their second album Glow, which entered the UK Albums Chart at number one.

== Critical reception ==
Larry Flick from Billboard magazine wrote, "What really draws you into this song is the initial guitar and bass intro, which is quite catchy. The lyrics, however, seem a bit rough and choppy. An interesting facet of the song is the gospel-like repetitive chorus, which seems to fit the track remarkably well, soothing the listener a bit from the tough solo vocals." Kevin Courtney from Irish Times complimented it as a "bright, brash tune". British magazine Music Week gave it top score with five out of five and named it Single of the Week, adding, "A fantastic comeback single from the rockers who have been recording with producer George Drakoulias to create a really funky rock sound. Deserves to be huge." David Sinclair from The Times noted the "infectious feel" of "Place Your Hands".

== Music video ==
The accompanying music video for "Place Your Hands", directed by David Mould, features the band members on pulleys and wires to create an energetic aerial display. It was later made available by Vevo on YouTube in 2011 and had generated almost six million views as of October 2023.

== Charts ==
Chart (1996–1997)	Peak position
Australia (ARIA)	28
Canada Top Singles (RPM)	83
Europe (Eurochart Hot 100)	37
Netherlands (Single Top 100)	85
New Zealand (Recorded Music NZ)	21
Scottish Singles Sales (Official Charts)	4
UK Singles (Official Charts)	6
US Mainstream Rock Tracks (Billboard)	30

== Certifications ==
Region	Certification	Certified units/sales
New Zealand (RMNZ)	Platinum	30,000^{‡}
United Kingdom (BPI)	Platinum	600,000^{‡}
^{‡} Sales+streaming figures based on certification alone.
