= Rides (album) =

Studio album by Reef
- Released: 19 April 1999
- Genre: Rock
- Length: 53:58
- Label: Sony
- Producer: George Drakoulias

Reef chronology
Glow (1997)	Rides (1999)	Getaway (2000)

Singles from Rides
- 1. "I've Got Something to Say" Released: 26 March 1999; 2. "Sweety" Released: 24 May 1999; 3. "New Bird" Released: 30 August 1999

Professional ratings
Review scores
Source	Rating
The Encyclopedia of Popular Music	3/5 stars
The Evening Post	3.5/5 stars

Rides is the third album by the Somerset rock group Reef, released in 1999.

The album peaked at No. 3 on the UK Albums Chart.

== Production ==
Recorded in California, the album was produced by George Drakoulias.

== Critical reception ==
The Guardian deemed the album "a characteristic mixture of bluesy riffs and shrieking, with passages of quasi-metal played off against nearly-ballads with acoustic guitars for added 'sensitivity'." The Sun Herald thought that "Drakoulias's production is workmanlike but it's a frill-free style that sits comfortably with the band's meat 'n' potatoes arrangements."

== Track listing ==
All music composed by Reef; all lyrics composed by Gary Stringer; except where noted.

1. "New Bird" – 2:33
2. "I've Got Something to Say" – 4:03
3. "Wandering" – 4:28
4. "Metro" – 3:24
5. "Hiding" – 5:27
6. "Sweety" – 3:39
7. "Locked Inside" (lyrics: Jack Bessant, Gary Stringer) – 2:59
8. "Back in My Place" – 4:11
9. "Undone and Sober" – 3:59
10. "Who You Are" – 2:51
11. "Love Feeder" – 3:38
12. "Moaner Snap" – 4:02
13. "Funny Feeling" – 6:10
14. "Electric Sunday" – 2:29

== Singles ==
- "I've Got Something to Say" #15 UK
- "Sweety" #46 UK
- "New Bird" #73 UK

== Personnel ==
Reef

- Gary Stringer – lead vocals, acoustic guitar
- Kenwyn House – electric guitar, acoustic guitar, bass
- Jack Bessant – bass, backing vocals, acoustic guitar, Nord Lead keyboard, organ, Taurus Moog foot pedals; lead vocals on "Locked Inside"
- Dominic Greensmith – drums, backing vocals, tambourine, marching bells, Chamberlain organ, acoustic guitar

Additional members

- George Drakoulias – tubular bells, backing vocals, theremin
- Benmont Tench – Chamberlain organ, piano, organ, electric piano
- Chris Trujillo – percussion
- David Campbell – orchestral arrangements
- Oren Waters – backing vocals
- Maxine Waters – backing vocals
- Julia Waters – backing vocals

== Charts ==
Chart performance for Rides
Chart (1999)	Peak position
Australian Albums (ARIA)	36
New Zealand Albums (RMNZ)	39
UK Albums (OCC)	3

== Certifications ==
Region	Certification	Certified units/sales
United Kingdom (BPI)	Silver	60,000^{*}
^{*} Sales figures based on certification alone.
