= Reef (band) =

English rock band

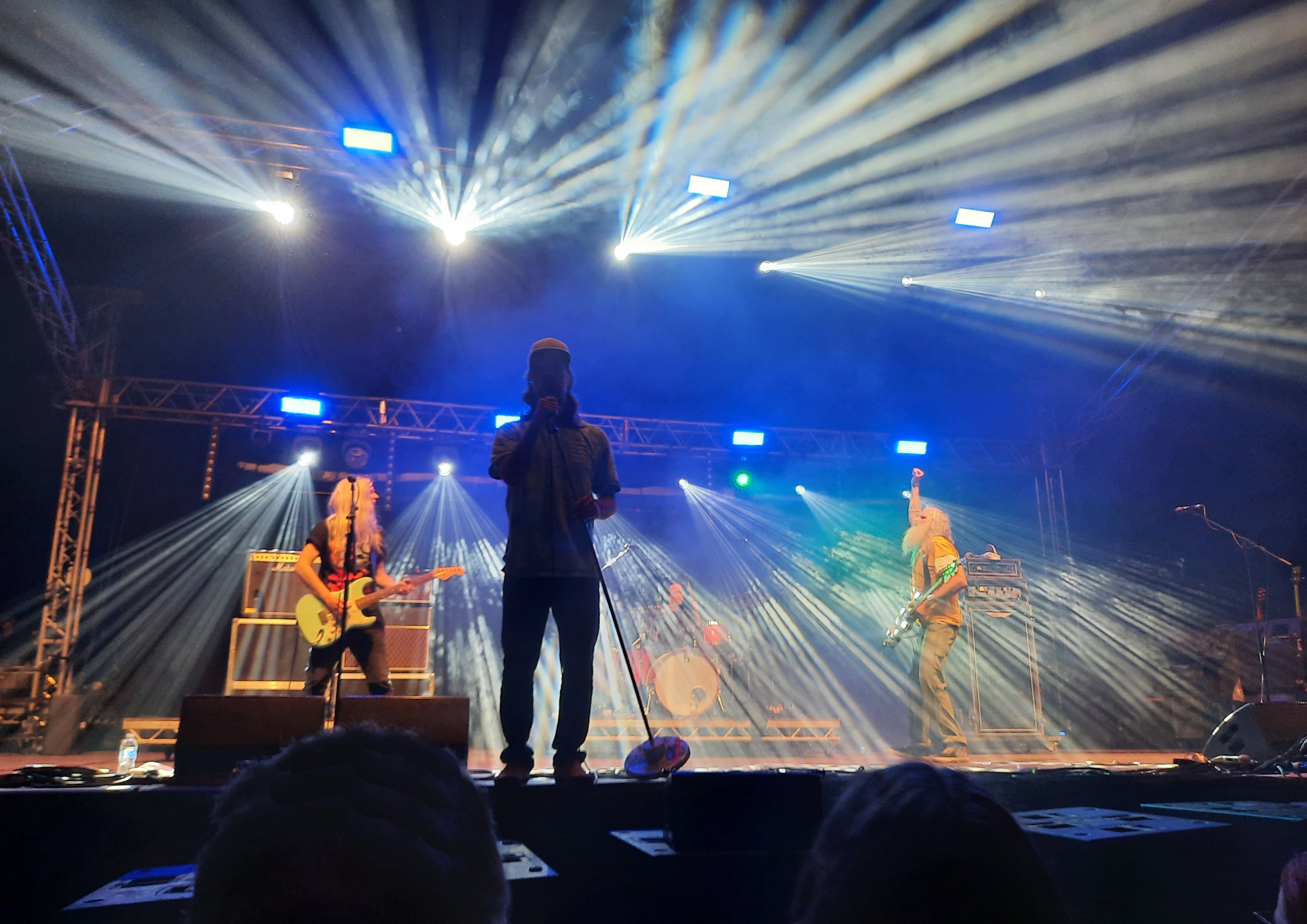
- Reef performing in 2023

Background information
- Origin: South West, England
- Genres: Indie rock; alternative rock; blues rock; hard rock; Britpop; funk rock
- Years active: 1993–2003, 2010–present
- Labels: Sony BMG; S2; Sony Soho Square; earMUSIC
- Members: Gary Stringer; Jack Bessant; Luke Bullen; Amy Newton
- Past members: Dominic Greensmith; Kenwyn House; Jesse Wood; Nathan "Tugg" Curran
- Website: reeftheband.com

Reef are an English rock band from Glastonbury whose members include Gary Stringer on vocals, Amy Newton on guitar, Jack Bessant on bass, and Luke Bullen on drums.

== Career ==
In 1993, Bessant and Stringer were looking for band members while Kenwyn House met Dominic Greensmith (from Barnstaple, Devon), and discussed forming a band. The foursome got together, producing the extremely rare "Purple Tape" demo.

After recording several tracks, the band spent much of 1994 touring and building up a fan base. They signed to S2, an offshoot of Sony. Their first single "Good Feeling" was released on an independent label, but financed by Sony, then as an official Sony S2 release in early 1995. This paved the way for "Naked", which was used in a TV advert for the Sony MiniDisc in which a record company executive hears the track on MiniDisc and throws it out of the window disapprovingly. It is picked up by a young man outside, who listens to it and likes it (demonstrating the format's durability).

=== Commercial success (1994–1999) ===
During 1994 and 1995, Reef supported Paul Weller, the Rolling Stones and Soundgarden, amongst others.

Both the "Good Feeling" and "Naked" singles came from Reef's 1995 release, their now gold debut album Replenish. The album was recorded in the remote Cornish Sawmills recording studio and in a studio in Bath.

In mid-1995 they released a four-track single release: "Weird". It was non-commercial and the band had said it was aimed at fans. "Sunrise Shakers", one of the B-sides to "Weird", was later included in snowboarding film Day Tripper, by independent film maker Christian Stevenson who later directed a promotional video for the band's 1999 single, "Sweety".

The follow-up to Replenish was 1997's Glow, with the band using more varied instruments and was produced by the Black Crowes' record producer, George Drakoulious and engineered by Jim Scott, in Los Angeles. It spawned the singles "Place Your Hands", "Come Back Brighter", "Consideration" and "Yer Old". On the week of its release, Glow went straight to number one on the UK Albums Chart. "Place Your Hands", released on 21 October 1996, was Reef's most successful single to date, reaching number 6 on the UK Singles Chart. Its video, directed by David Mould, features the band members on pulleys and wires to create an energetic aerial display. During their touring in late 1996, the band were supported by Feeder, who were relatively new.

In early 1999, they released their third album, Rides, recorded at Ocean Way Studios in Los Angeles, used by the Beach Boys for Pet Sounds and Michael Jackson for Thriller. They swapped instruments on some tracks, with Stringer and Greensmith playing guitar and Bessant singing on one song. Working again with Glow producer George Drakoulias, the band also enlisted the skills of David Campbell (father of American artist Beck) for the string arrangements. Rose Stone of Sly and the Family Stone fame acts as a backing singer. Jack told NME magazine that the album was showing a more mature side to Reef but they were still having fun, using slide guitars, and trying to achieve a "filmic" feel to some tracks. The album was well received by critics but did not match the earlier success of its predecessor, Glow.

=== Getaway (2000–2003) ===
The fourth album and most commercial work yet, Getaway was released by Sony in 2000, and was produced by Al Clay, who has also produced for the Pixies and Stereophonics. "Set The Record Straight" was the highlight of the album, and this track was also used as the theme tune for the BBC Television drama series Red Cap, starring Tamzin Outhwaite.

The "Superhero" single released in the same year, features a video of an impromptu gig held at Bessant's Hoxton Square flat, in London, in the summer of that year. Bessant was vacating the property and used the opportunity to hold a small gig with a select guest list, predominantly from the music industry. One notable guest was Andrea Corr, whilst also in attendance were BBC Radio 1, plus Kerrang! and NME magazines.

The third and final release from Getaway was "All I Want", a ballad, and substantially different from the first two releases. Despite good airplay on BBC Radio 2, the single only peaked at number 51 in the UK chart. The video features the members of the band stranded in a drifting lifeboat, drawing straws for who would sacrifice themselves to save the others.

Late 2000 saw Reef facing legal action from the U.S. company South Cone Inc. for infringement of their trademark, Reef Brazil (as found on sandals and footwear), on the basis that T-shirts, and other merchandising such as stickers, caps and keyrings could cause confusion in the marketplace. The South Cone action failed on account of their mark actually being REEF BRAZIL rather than REEF, and because their primary business and reputation was with the sale of sandals and footwear. Also important to the outcome was the fact that Reef (the band) were using the T-shirts and other items as marketing for the band rather than trying to promote the T-shirts (or any other clothing, including footwear) as a commodity in themselves. Reef (the band) were awarded £1000.

During 2001, after a low key tour supporting Texas, they took a long summer break, in North Devon, to write new material for their fifth album. The self-financed sessions were deliberately performed at arm's length from their record label and the music industry in general, and Reef enjoyed the opportunity to return to their earlier, more basic approach to making music. In an interview to the BBC, Bessant said "It's a harder sound, like when we first came out – a deep sound, heavy, I really like that." Whilst they had a lot of new material, Sony forced Reef to only use around a third of this material as part of a greatest hits offering entitled Together – The Best of Reef released in January 2003. Jack Bessant denounced the complete lack of support from Sony and Kenwyn House called the release "a kiss of death". Many fans felt the new material had been some of their best work for some time.

At the end of 2001 Reef played the Surfers Against Sewage Christmas Ball, in Bournemouth. They had previously played the SAS summer ball in 1995 in Newquay. In January 2003, their drummer Greensmith quit the band on the eve of a major UK tour, and as the greatest hits were released. He was replaced by the relatively unknown Nathan Curran. Curran had also drummed for Basement Jaxx, Lady Sovereign and Gorgon City. It was on this tour that the Live DVD was recorded at Bristol's Carling Academy. Around this time Reef also appeared on the BBC's re:covered programme covering Black Sabbath's "War Pigs", which appeared as a B-side to "Waster", Reef's last single, and their only single on the Snapper Music record label.

Headlining the Falmouth Regatta Week, on 15 August 2003, was to be the final live Reef appearance, before the band split up. In total they have had seven UK Top 20 singles.

"Place Your Hands" remains a party and compilation favourite. Reef played a small parody of this for Chris Evans TFI Friday show in the late nineties, for a feature called 'It's Your Letters'. Evans claimed that the band had contacted him to stop playing the clip, as fans were apparently singing along at gigs, but these allegations were largely unfounded. However Evans later denied the claims stating he was misquoted. Indeed, the band had written to Evans, however Gary Stringer explained it differently, "We don't want people to think that's all we're about" and went on "... he's gone on telly and said we storm offstage whenever someone in the crowd sings that version of it. But no-one ever does sing that version. I think he thinks his influence and power is a lot more widespread than it actually is."

They also played at the Reading Festival in 1999 and have had several appearances at Glastonbury Festival, and its local offshoot the Pilton Party held every year in September for local residents.

=== Change of direction (2004–2015) ===
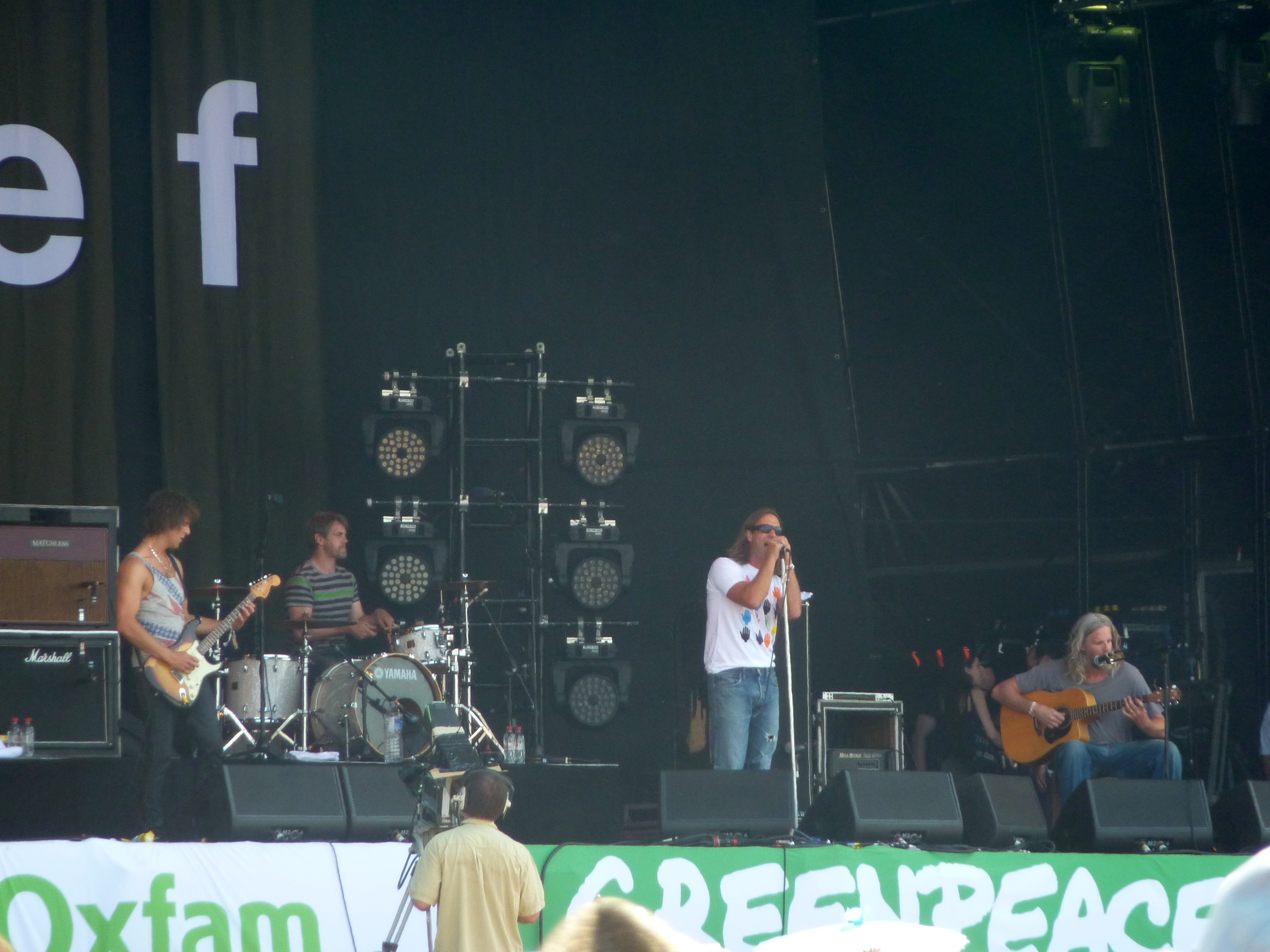
Reef playing at Glastonbury 2010

Reef took a long break from their constant touring. Stringer appeared at the Bristol Academy as a guest DJ on 28 February 2004.

On 3 April 2006, Martin Gilks, their former manager and The Wonder Stuff drummer, was killed in a motorcycle accident. He died aged 41, from internal injuries at St George's Hospital, Tooting, London. Gilks managed Reef with his brother Tank, alongside other bands, through their management company Furtive Mass Transit Systems. The original Reef line-up reformed to play three songs at the memorial in April 2006.

Stringer and Bessant formed a new band, Them Is Me. Other members include Jonas Jalhay on guitar (other bands: Lady Sovereign, Imma) and Nathan "Tugg" Curran on drums (ex-Reef, Basement Jaxx, Kano). Stringer and Bessant continue with their original roles as singer and bass player respectively. Having rehearsed in London over the summer, they played their first gig at the Sandsifter bar in Gwithian near Hayle, Cornwall, on 14 September 2007. After several low-key venues in Cornwall, they recorded some demo tracks at a recording studio in Monmouth. Stringer and Bessant have an acoustic project called "StringerBessant" with both musicians playing acoustic guitars. Their debut album Yard was released on "Xtra Mile Recordings" on 12 July 2010.

In April 2010, Reef had a reunion tour consisting of six UK concerts. The warm-up appearance at The Monto Water Rats in London, was their first in seven years. The band also performed at the 2010 Isle of Wight Festival, Cornbury Festival and Glastonbury Festival. They were supported on that tour by Irish band Young Aviators.

On 7 August 2011, Reef played before the Community Shield final between Manchester City and Manchester United.

In May 2012, they played at Lakefest festival. and on 29 July, Reef headlined the annual Steelhouse Festival in Ebbw Vale, Wales.

On 10 April 2014, Kenwyn House announced he would be leaving Reef to concentrate on working with his new band Goldray, and that his last appearance with Reef would be on 20 April. On 7 May 2014 Jesse Wood, Guitarist for The Ronnie Wood Band and son of Ronnie Wood was hired to replace Kenwyn House.

In 2014, Gary Stringer and Jack Bessant (as part of their StringerBessant project) did a song with Czech pop-singer Anna K.

From 21 August to 9 October that year, Reef undertook a UK tour, culminating in a sold-out gig at the Guildhall in St. Ives, Cornwall. This last performance was recorded in preparation for a new live album and DVD. For several numbers, the band brought in a backing choir from The Academy of Music and Theatre Arts (AMATA) at Falmouth University. Glow producer George Drakoulias and Gary Stringer spoke to BBC Radio Cornwall about the tour for a spot on David White's morning show.

=== Later work (2016–present) ===
In February 2016, the band went on tour joined by keyboardist Andy Wallace and in March 2016 the band released the single "How I Got Over", debuting the song on The Chris Evans Breakfast Show on BBC Radio 2. The single features a gospel choir recorded in Los Angeles and the video shows the band surfing in Cornwall. Various backing singers are used on each subsequent tour.

In April 2016, the band were announced as the opening act for two of the Coldplay concerts in June 2016 at Wembley Stadium. In April and May 2018, the group went go on a tour of the UK. On 4 May, the group released their fifth album, Revelation. On 27 June 2018, Greensmith announced his retirement from the band, via a post on Instagram, and was replaced live by Guillaume Charreau.

At the end of 2021, Reef announced that they had been working with former Duran Duran guitarist Andy Taylor on a new album, and that the record would be issued in April 2022 with the name Shoot Me Your Ace.

In April 2022 Reef went on a UK tour in support of their album Shoot Me Your Ace, along with special guests 'A'

In 2025, the band will embark on a winter UK tour to celebrate the 30th anniversary of their album, Replenish.

== Festival appearances ==
July 2026 Reef performed at the Haslemere Fringe Festival in Surrey, drawing in a crowd of fans old and new. Reef performed at the Reading Festival in 1995, 1996 and 1999 and at Glastonbury in w 1995, 1997, 2000 and 2010. They also played Australia's The Fall's Festival in 2000.

In May 2012, they played at Lakefest Festival. Reef also appeared at Triumph Live on 31 August that year.

In 2013, Reef played at five UK summer festivals and also did a "20th Anniversary UK Tour" in November this year, they played six shows in London, Birmingham, Glasgow, Manchester, Bristol and Cornwall.

Reef played The Isle of Wight Festival, Vicar's Picnic in Yalding, Kent, and headlined the Lindisfarne Festival near Holy Island in Northumberland in 2016.

In February 2017, Reef were named as being the Sunday night headliner for the inaugural Amplified Festival taking place on the weekend of 21–23 July 2017 at Quarrydowns, between Northleach and Aldsworth, in Gloucestershire. Reef played a full set at the British Grand Prix at Silverstone, on 15 July 2017. They played the "Ramblin Man" Fair in Maidstone, Kent on 29 July 2017. They then played on 9 September at The Beano Festival on Hastings Pier, in East Sussex, followed by the Wheels and Fins festival in Joss Bay, Kent, on 10 September, where they headlined the Sunday. A subsequent intimate gig (for approximately 250 people) at O'Neill's Flamingo Bar in Soho's Wardour Street, saw good reactions from ardent fans (Laners).

Reef played at Camp Bestival on 1 August 2021, and the Newbury Real Ale Festival on 11 September 2021.

At Glastonbury Festival in 2022, Reef were last minute replacements for The Damned, who were forced to pull out due to Covid, playing a headline set on The Field of Avalon Stage.

In 2023 Reef played the Northern Kin festival.

In 2024 Reef played the Norfolk Gone Wild festival with around 12,000 in attendance.

On 8th July 2026, Reef performed at the Celebration of Speed Festival at Lympstone Manor in Devon.

== Band members ==
Present

- Gary Stringer – lead vocals, acoustic guitar, tambourine (1993–2003, 2010–present)
- Jack Bessant – bass guitar, acoustic guitar, keyboards, backing vocals (1993–2003, 2010–present)
- Luke Bullen – drums (2020–present)
- Amy Newton – guitars (2023–present)

Live musicians

- Andy Wallace – keyboards (2016–present)
- Guillaume Charreau – drums (2018–2019)
- Andy Taylor – lead guitar (2019–present)
- Arya Goggin – drums (2019–2020)

Former

- Jesse Wood – guitar (2014–2023)
- Dominic Greensmith – drums (1993–2003, 2010–2018)
- Kenwyn House – guitar (1993–2003, 2010–2014)
- Nathan "Tugg" Curran – drums (2003)

Timeline

== Discography ==
Studio albums

- Replenish (1995)
- Glow (1997)
- Rides (1999)
- Getaway (2000)
- Revelation (2018)
- Shoot Me Your Ace (2022)
