= Monsters of Rock =

Former heavy metal music festival

Coordinates: 52.8444°N 1.3377°W

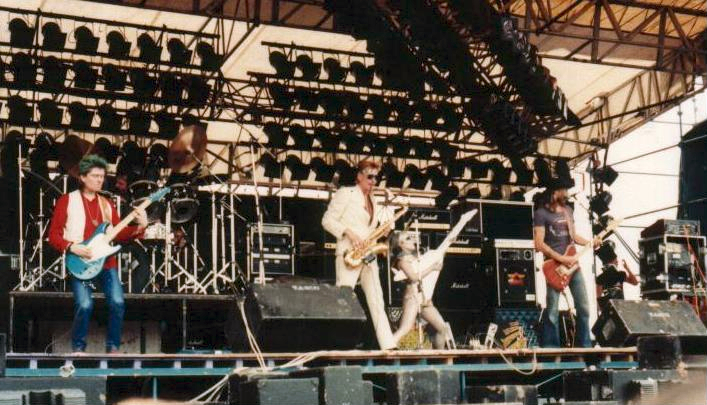
- Hawkwind playing Donington in 1982
- Genre: Hard rock, heavy metal
- Locations: Castle Donington, England (1980–1996)
- Years active: 1980–1988; 1990–1992; 1994–2000; 2002; 2004–2008; 2013; 2015–2017; 2023
- Founders: Paul Loasby and Maurice Jones
- Website: www.themonstersofrock.com

Monsters of Rock was a hard rock and heavy metal music festival. It was originally held annually in Castle Donington, England, from 1980 to 1996, taking place every year except 1989 and 1993. It later branched into other locations such as the Netherlands, Poland, Spain, Italy, Germany, France, Sweden, Argentina, Brazil, Chile, Colombia, the United States and Russia.

== History ==
In 1980, promoter Paul Loasby, along with Maurice Jones, planned a one-day festival dedicated specifically for bands within the hard rock and heavy metal genre. Loasby was an established and successful promoter working that year on the Rainbow UK tour and penned the festival as the final show of the tour for the band to headline. Jones knew the owner of the Donington Park race track, Tom Wheatcroft, located next to the village of Castle Donington in Leicestershire, England, and the site was chosen to host the event.

(A year earlier, promoter Bill Graham’s July 1979 Day on the Green Festival at Oakland Coliseum in California was also dubbed "The Monsters of Rock" show. This concert featured Aerosmith, Ted Nugent and AC/DC.)

Donington Park was unknown as a major location but its location in the East Midlands next to the M1 and A42 allowed for better transportation to the site from around the country. Additionally, the site ground level sloped which allowed for a better viewing for the audience throughout the site.

The first Monsters of Rock line-up consisted of a mix of British and international bands. The event was a success with 35,000 heavy metal fans attending. Although only conceived as a one-off event, it was mentioned on the day the idea that the festival will return the following year and the first edition birthed what would become a regular festival for the next 15 years, becoming synonymous as a Mecca for fans of the genre and further establishing the Midlands as the home of heavy metal.

Over the years, the attendance continued to grow, reaching 107,000 in 1988–where two fans died during the Guns N' Roses set. The blame was initially accounted to the large size of the crowd and a rush forward during the band's set. But it was officially declared that the cause was laid on the weather, causing muddy and wet conditions on the sloping ground. As a result, the festival did not take place in 1989, and it was replaced that year by a two-day festival similar to Monsters of Rock, the Moscow Music Peace Festival in Soviet Union, which included performances by several Monsters of Rock veterans Bon Jovi, Ozzy Osbourne, Mötley Crüe and Scorpions. Monsters of Rock returned the year after with a limitation to the crowd of 75,000.

The festival had been held in parallel in West Germany from 1983 to 1991. In 1984 and 1986 the festival branched into Sweden. In 1988, the festival occurred for the first time in France, Italy, Spain and the Netherlands. It was held as a one-time event in 1991 in Russia (one of the largest concerts of all time, with an estimated audience of over 1.6 million), Poland, Belgium, Hungary. In 1994, the festival was exported overseas to Chile, Argentina and Brazil.

In 1993 the Monsters of Rock radio show debuted in the United States with host Harlan Hendrickson. Guests on the show include everyone from AC/DC, Kiss, Van Halen, Judas Priest, Motörhead, Cinderella, Ozzy Osbourne, Bon Jovi, Cheap Trick, Mötley Crüe, Ratt, Dio, Y&T, Guns N' Roses, Slayer and Poison.

The Monsters of Rock festival continued on as the premier hard rock and heavy metal event in Great Britain in the 1990s but started to fall upon hard times as heavy metal became less popular, with another cancellation in 1993 due to being unable to find a strong enough headliner. In 1995 the festival found itself in a similar situation until Metallica agreed to play with the condition of the band having control over the event and naming it "Escape from the Studio". In 1996 Ozzy Osbourne and Kiss co-headlined the festival and although there were plans to extend the festival into a two-day event in 1997, the promoters once again found themselves in a struggle for headliners and the event was cancelled and discontinued.

Donington Park remained event-less until 2001 when the Rock and Blues Festival and Stereophonics held events at the site. In 2002 the Ozzfest tour returned to the UK using Donington Park as their only British event and the following year Live Nation picked up the reins as Monsters of Rock's successor in the name of Download Festival. An outstanding success from the offset, the festival continues to this day having increased to a three-day event with five stages, though as of 2008 the event has been relegated outside of the track.

On the 16th of November, 2002, Monsters of Rock was held in Wembley Arena as a one-day 'festival' and featured The Quireboys, The Dogs D'Amour, Alice Cooper, and Thunder.

In 2006, the Monsters of Rock name was revived and held at the National Bowl in Milton Keynes, England, for a one-off event headlined by Deep Purple and with Alice Cooper as a special guest.

In 2012 Harlan Hendrickson & Monsters of Rock Worldwide partnered with Larry Morand and Mike London to launch the inaugural Monsters Of Rock Cruise.

== Line-ups ==
(Note: Line-ups in this section are for the events held in the United Kingdom. They are listed with the headlining band first, followed by the reverse order of appearance by the other bands.)

=== 1980 ===
16 August 1980 (attendance: 35,000)

- Rainbow
- Judas Priest
- Scorpions
- April Wine
- Saxon (released as the semi-official live album Donington: The Live Tracks [sic]. "I still meet people," noted Biff Byford, "that come up and tell me about their own little twist on the day: 'Just as you started 747 (Strangers In The Night), a plane came over.' Of course, we wrote a song about [the event]: And the Bands Played On.")
- Riot
- Touch
- Neal Kay (DJ)

=== 1981 ===
22 August 1981 (attendance: 65,000)

- AC/DC
- Whitesnake
- Blue Öyster Cult
- Slade
- Blackfoot
- More
- Tommy Vance (DJ)

=== 1982 ===
21 August 1982 (attendance: 35,000)

- Status Quo
- Gillan
- Saxon (the first band to appear twice)
- Hawkwind
- Uriah Heep
- Anvil
- Tommy Vance (DJ)

=== 1983 ===
20 August 1983 (attendance: 35,000)

- Whitesnake
- Meat Loaf
- ZZ Top
- Twisted Sister (Police asked Dee Snider to limit his F-word usage to sixteen. Asked subsequently why he exceeded that limit, he explained he "hadn't realised that 'motherfuckers' would be included".)
- Dio
- Diamond Head
- Tommy Vance (DJ)

=== 1984 ===
18 August 1984 (attendance: 65,000)

- AC/DC (first band to headline twice)
- Van Halen (David Lee Roth's final appearance with Van Halen in the UK)
- Ozzy Osbourne
- Gary Moore
- Y&T (not at Karlsruhe)
- Accept
- Mötley Crüe
- Tommy Vance (DJ)

=== 1985 ===
17 August 1985 (attendance: 50,000)

- ZZ Top
- Marillion
- Bon Jovi
- Metallica
- Ratt
- Magnum
- Tommy Vance (DJ)

=== 1986 ===
16 August 1986 (attendance: 40,000)

- Ozzy Osbourne
- Scorpions
- Def Leppard (drummer Rick Allen's first major concert appearance after the 1984 car accident that resulted in the loss of his arm.)
- Motörhead
- Bad News
- Warlock (first time a woman performed at the festival)

=== 1987 ===
22 August 1987 (attendance: 65,000)

- Bon Jovi
- Dio
- Metallica
- Anthrax
- W.A.S.P.
- Cinderella
- The Bailey Brothers (DJs)

=== 1988 ===
20 August 1988 (attendance: 107,000)

- Iron Maiden (Released as part of Eddie's Archive, this was the loudest set in the festival's history.)
- Kiss ("It wasn't Kiss at its very best," recalled Paul Stanley. "We were on during the day, and we didn't even have our standard show at that point when we were out of makeup. But, in some ways, Donington is a great type of boot camp, because you can't depend upon anything other than guts and glory to make something work.")
- David Lee Roth
- Megadeth
- Guns N' Roses (Two fans were trampled to death during "It's So Easy", hence giving them the title of "The Most Dangerous Band In The World.")
- Helloween

=== 1990 ===
18 August 1990 (attendance: 72,000) The entire 1990 festival was simultaneously broadcast live on BBC Radio 1, which had previously recorded festivals for later broadcast.

- Whitesnake (recorded as Live at Donington 1990)
- Aerosmith (Jimmy Page performed Train Kept a-Rollin' with Aerosmith)
- Poison
- Quireboys
- Thunder

=== 1991 ===
17 August 1991 (attendance: 65,000)

- AC/DC (their portion released as Live at Donington)
- Metallica
- Mötley Crüe
- Queensrÿche
- The Black Crowes

Attendance: 65,000

=== 1992 ===
22 August 1992 (this was also broadcast live on Radio 1) (attendance: 56,000)

- Iron Maiden (recorded as Live at Donington)
- Skid Row
- Thunder
- Slayer
- W.A.S.P.
- The Almighty (recorded as a bonus disk on Powertrippin')

=== 1994 ===
4 June 1994 (another festival broadcast live; highlights were transmitted in 1995 and 1996) (attendance: 56,000). This was the first year that two stages were used. Readers of Kerrang! magazine were invited to vote on bands to appear at the festival. Extreme easily won their place on the bill but were bottled for much of their set.

Main stage:

- Aerosmith
- Extreme
- Pantera
- Sepultura
- Therapy?
- Pride & Glory

Second Stage:

- The Wildhearts
- Terrorvision
- Skin
- Biohazard
- Cry of Love
- Headswim

=== 1995 ===
26 August 1995 (attendance: 60,000) 1995 was not billed as 'Monsters of Rock' but as 'Escape from the Studio', owing to Metallica headlining on a break from recording the Load album – making them the first band to play the festival four times (while Therapy? became the first to play in consecutive years). Prior to the show, reverend Brian Whitehead held a special service at the Castle Donington village's St Edward church, to combat the "occult forces" that he feared would be unleashed by the event, especially White Zombie.

- Metallica (Their fourth appearance and only appearance as headliner)
- Therapy?
- Skid Row
- Slayer
- Slash's Snakepit
- White Zombie
- Machine Head
- Warrior Soul
- Corrosion of Conformity

=== 1996 ===
17 August 1996. Ozzy Osbourne and Kiss co-headlined, with Kiss being the final band on stage. (attendance: 50,000)

Main stage:

- Kiss and Ozzy Osbourne
- Sepultura performed as a three-piece; frontman Max Cavalera was absent owing to the death of his stepson.
- Biohazard
- Dog Eat Dog
- Paradise Lost
- Fear Factory

Kerrang! Stage:

- Korn
- Type O Negative
- Everclear
- 3 Colours Red
- Honeycrack
- Cecil

=== 2006 ===
3 June 2006 – Milton Keynes Bowl

- Deep Purple
- Alice Cooper
- Thunder
- Queensrÿche
- Journey
- Ted Nugent
- Roadstar

== International events ==
=== 1983 West Germany Tour ===
West Germany: Dortmund, Westfalenhallen – 2 September 1983 Kaiserslautern, Waldstadion am Erbsenberg – 3 September 1983 Nürnberg, Zeppelinfeld – 4 September 1983

- Whitesnake
- Blue Öyster Cult
- Thin Lizzy
- Saxon
- Meat Loaf
- Motörhead
- Twisted Sister

=== 1984 North European Tour ===
Sweden: Stockholm, Råsunda Stadium – 25 August 1984

- AC/DC
- Van Halen
- Mötley Crüe

West Germany: Karlsruhe, Wildparkstadion – 1 September 1984
West Germany: Nuremberg, Zeppelinfeld – 2 September 1984

- AC/DC
- Van Halen
- Ozzy Osbourne
- Dio
- Gary Moore
- Accept
- Mötley Crüe

=== 1986 North European Tour ===
Sweden Stockholm, Råsunda Stadium – 23 August 1986

- Scorpions
- Ozzy Osbourne
- Def Leppard
- Zero Nine

West Germany: Nuremberg, Zeppelinfeld – 30 August 1986
West Germany: Mannheim, Maimarktgelände – 31 August 1986

- Scorpions
- Ozzy Osbourne
- M.S.G. (McAuley Schenker Group)
- Def Leppard
- Bon Jovi
- Warlock

=== 1987 European Tour ===
Italy: Reggio Emilia, Aeroporto di Reggio Emilia – 26 August 1987

- Dio
- Helloween
- Skanners
- Black Swan
- Gow

West Germany: Nuremberg, Messegelände – 29 August 1987
West Germany: Pforzheim, Stadion im Brötzinger Tal – 30 August 1987

- Deep Purple
- Dio
- Metallica
- Ratt
- Cinderella
- Helloween
- Pretty Maids (Due to technical reasons, their show in Pforzheim was cancelled)

=== 1988 USA & Europe Tour ===
USA: 23 May – 30 July

- Van Halen
- Scorpions
- Dokken
- Metallica
- Kingdom Come

West Germany: Schweinfurt, Mainwiesen Gelände – 27 August 1988
West Germany: Bochum, Ruhrland Stadion – 28 August 1988

- Iron Maiden
- Kiss
- David Lee Roth
- Anthrax
- Testament (Megadeth cancelled)
- Great White
- Treat (did not play in Bochum)

Netherlands: Tilburg, Willem II Stadion – 4 September 1988

- Iron Maiden
- David Lee Roth
- Kiss
- Anthrax
- Helloween
- Great White

Italy: Modena, Festa de l'Unità – 10 September 1988

- Iron Maiden
- Kiss
- Anthrax
- Helloween
- Kings of the Sun
- R.A.F.

Spain: Pamplona, Plaza de Toros – 17 September 1988
Spain: Madrid, Casa de Campo – 18 September 1988
Spain: Barcelona, Plaza de Toros – 22 September 1988

- Iron Maiden
- Metallica
- Anthrax
- Helloween
- Manzano

France: Paris, Palais Omnisports de Paris-Bercy – 24 & 25 September 1988

- Iron Maiden
- Trust – The live album Paris by night was recorded on 25 September
- Anthrax
- Helloween

=== 1990 European Tour ===
Sweden: Stockholm, Stockholm Globe Arena – 21 August 1990

- Whitesnake
- Poison
- The Quireboys

West Germany: West Berlin, Waldbühne – 23 August 1990

- Whitesnake
- Aerosmith
- Poison

West Germany: Dortmund, Westfalenhallen – 25 August 1990

- Whitesnake
- Aerosmith
- Dio
- Poison
- Vixen
- The Front

Netherlands: Utrecht, Stadion Galgenwaard – 26 August 1990

- Whitesnake
- Aerosmith
- Poison
- Quireboys

Italy: Bologna, Arena Parco Nord – 30 August 1990

- Whitesnake
- Aerosmith
- Poison
- The Quireboys
- Faith No More
- Vixen
- The Front

West Germany: Mannheim, Maimarktgelände – 1 September 1990

- Whitesnake
- Aerosmith
- Dio
- Poison
- Vixen
- The Front
- Cold Sweat

Note: This particular show was promoted as "Super Rock 1990".

France: Paris, Hippodrome de Vincennes – 3 September 1990

- Whitesnake
- Aerosmith
- Poison
- The Front
- Faith No More
- Face to Face
- Quireboys

Note: Face to Face was a French band related to Trust. Faith No More was not on the ticket list but was present to the show.

=== 1991 European Tour ===
Denmark: Copenhagen, Gentofte Stadion – 10 August 1991

- AC/DC
- Metallica
- Queensrÿche
- The Black Crowes

Poland: Chorzów, Śląski Stadion – 13 August 1991

- AC/DC
- Metallica
- Queensrÿche

Hungary: Budapest, Népstadion – 22 August 1991

- AC/DC
- Metallica
- Mötley Crüe
- Queensrÿche

Germany: München, Galopprennbahn München Riem, 24 August 1991

- AC/DC
- Metallica
- Mötley Crüe
- Queensrÿche
- The Black Crowes

Switzerland: Basel, St. Jakobs Stadium, 25 August 1991

- AC/DC
- Metallica
- Mötley Crüe
- Queensrÿche
- The Black Crowes

Belgium: Hasselt, Belgium, Domein Kiewit – 30 August 1991

- AC/DC
- Metallica
- Mötley Crüe
- Queensrÿche

Germany: Hannover, Germany, Niedersachsenstadion – 31 August 1991

- AC/DC
- Metallica
- Mötley Crüe
- Queensrÿche
- The Black Crowes

Netherlands: Nijmegen, Goffert Stadion – 1 September 1991

- AC/DC
- Metallica
- Queensrÿche
- The Black Crowes

Germany: Mainz, Finthen Army Airfield – 7 September 1991

- AC/DC
- Metallica
- Mötley Crüe
- Queensrÿche
- The Black Crowes

Austria: Graz, Liebenauer Stadion – 11 September 1991

- AC/DC
- Metallica
- Queensrÿche

Italy: Modena, Festa dell'Unità – 14 September 1991

- AC/DC
- Metallica
- Queensrÿche
- The Black Crowes
- Negazione

France: Paris, Hippodrome de Vincennes – 21 September 1991

- AC/DC
- Metallica
- Queensrÿche
- The Black Crowes
- Patrick Rondat

Spain: Barcelona, Estadio Olímpico Lluís Companys – 24 September 1991

- AC/DC
- Metallica
- Tesla
- Legion

Soviet Union: Moscow, Tushino Airfield – 28 September 1991

- AC/DC
- Metallica
- Pantera
- The Black Crowes
- E.S.T. (Russian heavy metal band)

Attendance was estimated to be between six hundred thousand to well over one million people at this free event, ranking as one of the largest rock concerts in history. Several documentaries have been made about this show or include this show in the content.

Partially released as For Those About to Rock, Monsters in Moscow. The versions of "Whole Lotta Rosie" and "The Jack" that AC/DC performed at this concert, were released on two of AC/DC's live albums, AC/DC Live and AC/DC Live: 2 CD Collector's Edition. Metallica's performances of "Harvester of Sorrow" and "Creeping Death" from this show were used as B-sides for the "Sad but True" single in different regional editions. Pantera's "Cowboys from Hell" performance is featured as a playable song in the video games Guitar Hero Smash Hits and Rock Band 4. Tushino Airfield was recreated as a virtual venue in Guitar Hero Metallica.

=== 1992 South European tour ===
Italy: Reggio Emilia, Arena Festa Nazionale Dell'Unita' – 12 September 1992

- Iron Maiden – the song "Heaven Can Wait" of A Real Live One album was recorded there
- Black Sabbath
- Megadeth
- Pantera
- Testament
- Warrant
- Pino Scotto

The bands Danzig and Gun both canceled their appearances at the festival. They are featured on the poster for the event.

Spain: Barcelona, Plaza de Toros – 14 September 1992
Spain: San Sebastián, Velódromo de Anoeta – 17 September 1992
Spain: Madrid, Las Arenas Plaza de Toros – 18 September 1992
Spain: Zaragoza, Municipal Tent – 19 September 1992

- Iron Maiden
- Megadeth
- Pantera
- Gun

=== 1994 South American Tour ===
Brazil: São Paulo, Estádio do Pacaembu – 27 August 1994

- KISS
- Slayer
- Black Sabbath (with Tony Martin on vocals)
- Suicidal Tendencies
- Angra
- Viper
- Raimundos
- Dr. Sin

Chile: Santiago, Estación Mapocho – 1 September 1994

- Kiss
- Black Sabbath (with Tony Martin on vocals)
- Slayer
- Tumulto

Argentina: Buenos Aires, River Plate Stadium – 3 September 1994

- KISS (Headliner)
- Black Sabbath (with Tony Martin on vocals)
- Slayer
- Hermética (Manowar was announced but never got to play)
- Gatos Sucios

=== 1995 South American Tour ===
Brazil: São Paulo, Estádio do Pacaembu – September 1995

2nd

- Ozzy Osbourne
- Alice Cooper
- Faith No More
- Megadeth
- Therapy?
- Paradise Lost
- Virna Lisi
- Rata Blanca
- Clawfinger

Chile: Santiago, Teatro Caupolicán – September 1995

8th

- Alice Cooper
- Megadeth
- Clawfinger
- Therapy?

9th

- Ozzy Osbourne
- Faith No More
- Paradise Lost

Argentina: Buenos Aires, Ferro Carril Oeste Stadium – September 1995

9th

- Alice Cooper
- Megadeth
- Clawfinger
- Therapy?
- Rata Blanca

10th

- Ozzy Osbourne
- Faith No More
- Paradise Lost
- Logos
- Malón

=== 1996 Brazil ===
Brazil: São Paulo, Estádio do Pacaembu – 24 August 1996

- Iron Maiden
- Skid Row
- Motörhead
- Biohazard
- Raimundos
- Helloween
- King Diamond
- Mercyful Fate
- Héroes del Silencio

This event marked the last performance of the original lineup of Skid Row, before parting with singer Sebastian Bach and drummer Rob Affuso.

=== 1997 Argentina ===
Argentina: Buenos Aires, Ferro Carril Oeste Stadium – 13 December 1997

- Whitesnake (Headliner)
- Megadeth
- Pantera
- Queensrÿche
- Riff (Argentine band)
- Halógena

=== 1998 South American Tour ===
Brazil: São Paulo - Estádio Ícaro de Castro Melo - near Ibirapuera Park – 26 September 1998

- Slayer
- Megadeth
- Manowar
- Dream Theater
- Saxon
- Savatage
- Glenn Hughes
- Korzus
- Dorsal Atlântica

Van Halen was supposed to be the headliner, but it never materialized.

Chile: Santiago, Velódromo Estadio Nacional – 10 December 1998

- Slayer
- Anthrax
- Helloween
- Criminal
- Panzer

Iron Maiden was going to appear at the festival as a headliner, but they were forced to cancel due to the arrest of Augusto Pinochet in London.

Argentina: Buenos Aires, Vélez Sársfield Stadium – 12 December 1998

- Iron Maiden
- Slayer
- Soulfly
- Helloween
- Angra
- O'Connor

=== 1999 Argentina ===
Argentina: Buenos Aires, River Plate Stadium – 14 May 1999

- Metallica
- Sepultura
- Catupecu Machu
- Almafuerte

Marilyn Manson was going to appear at the festival, but they were forced to cancel due to the Columbine High School massacre

=== 2004 Italy ===
Italy: Como, Stadio Sinigaglia – 13 July 2004

- Deep Purple
- Status Quo
- Cheap Trick
- Settevite

=== 2005 South American Tour ===
Argentina: Buenos Aires, Ferro Carril Oeste Stadium – 11 September 2005

- Judas Priest
- Whitesnake
- Rata Blanca
- Tristemente Celebres
- Lörihen

Chile: Santiago, Pista Atlética Estadio Nacional – 13 September 2005

- Whitesnake
- Judas Priest
- Rata Blanca
- Dorso
- Fiskales Ad-Hok

=== 2006 Spain ===
Spain: Zaragoza, Feria de Zaragoza – 18 June 2006

- Primal Fear
- Saxon
- Apocalyptica
- W.A.S.P.
- Whitesnake
- Scorpions

=== 2007 Spain ===
Spain: Zaragoza, Feria de Zaragoza – June 2007

22nd

- Ozzy Osbourne
- Children of Bodom
- Megadeth
- Mägo de Oz
- Black Label Society
- Brujeria

23rd

- Motörhead
- Slayer
- Dream Theater
- Blind Guardian
- Pretty Maids
- Kamelot
- Mastodon
- Riverside

=== 2008 Chile & Spain ===
Chile: Santiago, Pista Atlética Estadio Nacional – 1 April 2008

- Ozzy Osbourne (Headliner)
- Korn
- Black Label Society

Spain: Zaragoza, Feria de Zaragoza – July 2008

11th

- Deep Purple (Cancelled)
- Thin Lizzy
- Twisted Sister (Cancelled)
- Ted Nugent
- Saxon (Cancelled)
- Pretty Maids
- Candlemass
- Rage

12th (Cancelled due to rain)

- Iron Maiden
- Slayer
- Avantasia
- Iced Earth
- Avenged Sevenfold
- Lauren Harris
- Rose Tattoo
- Baron Rojo
- Leyenda
- Jobis Bay

=== 2013 Brazil ===
Brazil: São Paulo, Anhembi Convention Center – October 2013

19th

- Slipknot
- Korn
- Limp Bizkit
- Killswitch Engage
- Hatebreed
- Gojira
- Project46

20th

- Aerosmith
- Whitesnake
- Ratt
- Geoff Tate's Queensrÿche
- Buckcherry
- Dokken

=== 2015 South American Tour ===
Brazil: São Paulo, Anhembi Convention Center – April 2015

25th

- Ozzy Osbourne
- Judas Priest
- Motörhead (Due to illness, Lemmy Kilmister couldn't perform. Remaining members Phil Campbell and Mikkey Dee jammed a few Motörhead songs with musicians from Sepultura).
- Black Veil Brides
- Rival Sons
- Coal Chamber
- Primal Fear

26th

- Kiss
- Judas Priest
- Manowar
- Accept
- Unisonic
- Yngwie Malmsteen
- Steel Panther

- Attend/Capacity/Gross Sales: 72,337 / 76,428 / $6,365,540 (1 sellout)

Brazil: Curitiba, Pedreira Paulo Leminski – 28 April 2015

- Ozzy Osbourne
- Judas Priest
- Motörhead

- Attend/Capacity/Gross Sales: 12,820 / 20,000 / $1,038,600

Brazil: Porto Alegre, Estádio Passo d'Areia – 30 April 2015

- Ozzy Osbourne
- Judas Priest
- Motörhead
- Zerodoze

- Attend/Capacity/Gross Sales: 14,199 / 19,600 / $997,006

Argentina: Buenos Aires, Ciudad del Rock – 2 May 2015

- Ozzy Osbourne
- Judas Priest
- Motörhead
- Carajo
- Malón
- Plan 4
- El Buen Salvaje

- Attend/Capacity/Gross Sales: 26,354 / 35,000 / $1,304,240

=== 2016 Germany ===
Germany: Sankt Goarshausen, Loreley Freilichtbühne – 17 June 2016; Bietigheim-Bissingen, Festplatz am Viadukt - 18 June 2016

- Rainbow
- Manfred Mann's Earth Band
- Thin Lizzy

=== 2017 Argentina ===
Argentina: Buenos Aires, Tecnopolis – 4 November 2017

- Megadeth
- Rata Blanca
- Anthrax
- Vimic
- Plan 4

=== 2023 Colombia ===
Colombia: Bogotá, Estadio El Campín – 15 April 2023

- Kiss
- Scorpions
- Deep Purple
- Helloween
- Angra

=== 2023 Brazil ===
Brazil: São Paulo, Allianz Parque – 22 April 2023

- Kiss
- Scorpions
- Deep Purple
- Helloween
- Candlemass
- Symphony X
- Doro

=== 2025 Brazil ===
Brazil: São Paulo, Allianz Parque – 19 April 2025

- Scorpions
- Judas Priest
- Europe
- Savatage
- Queensrÿche
- Opeth
- Stratovarius

=== 2025 Colombia ===
Colombia: Bogotá, Coliseo MedPlus – 30 April 2025

- Scorpions
- Judas Priest
- Europe
- Opeth
- Darkness(banda)
- Krönös

=== 2026 Brazil ===
Brazil: São Paulo, Allianz Parque – 04 April 2026

- Guns N' Roses
- Lynyrd Skynyrd
- Extreme (band)
- Halestorm
- Yngwie Malmsteen
- Dirty Honey
- JAYLER

== In popular culture ==
Saxon wrote the song "And the Bands Played On" about their appearance at the 1980 festival.

The 1986 appearance by Bad News was featured in the TV mockumentary More Bad News.

In 1993, the Monsters of Rock radio show debuted. Harlan Hendrickson, host and creator of the Monsters of Rock, broadcasts from the rock radio station WRIF in Detroit. The Monsters of Rock is currently syndicated nationally/internationally through United Stations Radio Networks where it currently airs in over 60 markets in the United States alone. The program currently holds the number-one or number-two slots among males 25–54 on the majority of stations that carry it. Guests on the show have included of AC/DC, Kiss, Van Halen, Slayer, Motörhead, Cinderella, Ozzy Osbourne, Bon Jovi, Cheap Trick, Mötley Crüe, Ratt and Poison.

In 1994, Beavis and Butt-Head episode "Take a Number", Beavis and Butt-Head attempt to get tickets to Creatures of Rock which is a parody of Monsters of Rock

In the 2005 Half Man Half Biscuit song "Mate of the Bloke" on their album Achtung Bono, the protagonist sings of legal action taken against him by More O'Ferrall for spraying the legend "in church hall if wet" onto a billboard for Monsters of Rock.

In 2012, Harlan Hendrickson teamed up with Larry Morand and Mike London to launch the "Monsters of Rock Cruise", which is a multi day music cruise celebrating the Castle Donington festival. Artists such as Saxon, UFO, Cinderella, Tesla, The Quireboys and others from the original festival have been featured on the cruise.

== See also ==
- List of Donington Park Festivals
- Download Festival
