= Belfast Confetti =

Belfast Confetti may refer to:

- Belfast Confetti (poem), a poem by Ciaran Carson
- Belfast Confetti (album), an album by Ricky Warwick
