= Crank (The Almighty album) =

Studio album by the Almighty
- Released: October 1994
- Recorded: Spring 1994
- Studio: The Manor Studio, Kidlington; Ridge Farm Studio, Rusper; The Church, Crouch End
- Genre: Hard rock, heavy metal
- Length: 44:29
- Label: Chrysalis
- Producer: Chris Sheldon

The Almighty chronology
Powertrippin' (1993)	Crank (1994)	Just Add Life (1996)

Professional ratings
Review scores
Source	Rating
AllMusic	4.5/5 stars

Crank is the fourth studio album released by Scottish rock band the Almighty. Two singles, "Jonestown Mind" and "Wrench", were released from the album in multiple parts in the United Kingdom. Music videos were made for both singles. Crank peaked at No. 15 in the UK albums chart. The cover artwork, showing an angel throwing a Molotov cocktail at a planet (earth) made out of money was created by noted British artist and anarchist Jamie Reid, who also designed the famous ransom note cover for the Sex Pistols album, Never Mind the Bollocks, Here's the Sex Pistols.

The album was remastered and re-released only in Japan under the Victor Entertainment label including all the studio b-sides from singles released from the album.

Andy Cairns, frontman of the rock band Therapy?, contributed vocals to several tracks.

== Track listing ==
All songs written by Ricky Warwick except as indicated

1. "Ultraviolent" – 3:25
2. "Wrench" – 4:13
3. "The Unreal Thing" – 4:02
4. "Jonestown Mind" (Warwick, Friesen) – 3:42
5. "Move Right In" (Friesen, Warwick) – 3:08
6. "Crank and Deceit" (Warwick, Friesen, Del James) – 2:32
7. "United State of Apathy" – 3:27
8. "Welcome to Defiance" (Warwick, Friesen) – 3:39
9. "Way Beyond Belief" (Friesen, Warwick, London, Munroe) – 5:00
10. "Crackdown" – 2:57
11. "Sorry for Nothing" (Warwick, Friesen) – 3:15
12. "Cheat" – 2:40
13. "Shitzophrenic" (London) – 2:36
  - hidden track; instrumental

=== 1998 Japan remastered bonus tracks ===
14. "Knocking on Joe" – 3:57
15. "Thanks Again, Again" (Warwick, James) – 4:11
16. "Do Anything You Wanna Do" (Ed Hollis, Graeme Douglas) – 3:37
  - Eddie & the Hot Rods cover
17. "State of Emergency" (Jake Burns) – 2:29
  - Stiff Little Fingers cover
18. "Give Me Fire" (Colin Abrahall, Colin Blyth, Ross Lomas, Andrew Williams) – 3:03
  - Charged GBH cover
19. "Hellelujah" – 3:40
20. "Jonestown Mind (Ruts Mix)" (Warwick, Friesen) – 5:24
  - Remixed by Glen David "Dave" Ruffy & John "Segs" Jennings (The Ruts)

== Personnel ==
As listed in liner notes.

The Almighty

- Ricky Warwick – vocals, guitars
- Pete Friesen – guitars
- Floyd London – bass guitar, vocals
- Stump Munroe – drums

Additional musicians

- Andy Cairns – additional vocals
- Eileen Rose – additional vocals & spoken intro to "United State of Apathy"

Production

- Lorraine Frances – assistant engineer, The Manor
- Chris Sheldon – producer
- Matt Sime – assistant mixer, The Church, Crouch End [summer 1994]
- Phil Woods – assistant engineer, Ridge Farm Studio, Rusper (overdubs)
- Darren Allison – engineer, mixer, The Church Crouch End (bonus tracks 14,15,16 &18)

Mastered by Andy Van Dett at Masterdisk, New York
