= Just Add Life =

Studio album by The Almighty
- Released: March 1996
- Recorded: at Great Linford Manor, The Townhouse and Ridge Farm Studio
- Genre: Hard rock, heavy metal
- Length: 40:59
- Label: Chrysalis
- Producer: Chris Sheldon

The Almighty chronology
| Crank (1994) | Just Add Life (1996) | The Almighty (2000) |

Professional ratings
Review scores
| Source | Rating |
|---|---|
| Allmusic | 3/5 stars |

Just Add Life is a 1996 album by Scottish rock band The Almighty; it was the band's fifth studio album and the last released until 2000's self-titled album during which time the band split up. Two singles, "All Sussed Out" and "Do You Understand" were released from the album in multiple parts in the United Kingdom and both were made into music videos. The song "Coalition Star" was co-written with members of punk band The Ruts, of which Warwick was a fan. The album was also issued as a two disc set including the bonus studio track "Misery Guts" and a 17-track live disc known as Just Add Live.

== Track listing ==
All songs written by Ricky Warwick except as indicated:

1. "Ongoing & Total" – 4:16
2. "Do You Understand" – 3:16
3. "All Sussed Out" (Ricky Warwick, Pete Friesen) – 3:17
4. "How Real is Real for You" – 2:33
5. "Dead Happy" – 3:16
6. "Some Kind of Anything" – 2:26
  - Floyd London on lead vocals
7. "Coalition Star" (Warwick, Paul Fox, Dave Ruffy, John "Segs" Jennings) – 4:42
8. "8 Day Depression" – 3:05
9. "Look What Happened Tomorrow" – 3:07
10. "360" – 3:27
11. "Feed the Need" – 3:32
12. "Afraid of Flying" – 0:43
13. "Independent Deterrent" (Warwick, Friesen) – 3:28

== B-Sides ==
1. "Misery Guts" – 3:12
2. "Superpower" – 3:16
3. "DSS (Desperately Seeking Something)" – 2:03
4. "Tense Nervous Headshake" – 1:42
5. "Canned Jesus" (Friesen) – 3:09
6. "Everybody's Burning"
7. "I Fought the Law (Live)" – 3:18
8. "Do You Understand (I.L.R. Radio Session)" – 3:18

== Personnel ==
As listed in liner notes.

The Almighty

- Ricky Warwick – vocals, guitars
- Pete Friesen – guitars
- Floyd London – bass, vocals
- Stump Munroe – drums

Additional musicians

- Mark Feltham – harmonica on "Independent Deterrent"
- James Taylor – Hammond B3 organ on "8 Day Depression" and "Feed the Need"

'Kick Horns' on "All Sussed Out"

- Simon Clarke – baritone and alto saxophone
- Roddy Lorimer – trumpet
- Tim Sanders – tenor saxophone

Production

- Pom & Phil Luff – assistant engineers, Ridge Farm Studio, Rusper
- John Rodd – assistant engineer, Great Linford Manor
- Chris Sheldon – producer
- Mark Warner – mixer and assistant engineer, The Townhouse

Mastered by Andy Van Dett at Masterdisk, New York
