= Soul Destruction =

Studio album by The Almighty
- Released: 30 March 1991
- Recorded: At Trident II Studios, London SWI December 1990/January 1991
- Genre: Hard rock, heavy metal
- Length: 58:34
- Label: Polydor
- Producer: Andy Taylor

The Almighty chronology
Blood, Fire & Live (1990)	Soul Destruction (1991)	Powertrippin' (1993)

Professional ratings
Review scores
Source	Rating
AllMusic	2/5 stars
Sounds	4/5 stars

Soul Destruction is the second studio album (third overall) released by Scottish rock band The Almighty. It was released by Polydor Records in the United Kingdom in 1991. According to frontman Ricky Warwick, the album's songs centered on four subjects:

The Album is about four basic things – hate, love, religion and sex. All those subjects fascinate me, especially sex... I spent a lot of time in bed with my wife researching new lyrics for the album. ~Ricky Warwick, 1991

It was The Almighty's last album with founding guitarist Tantrum who would be replaced by Alice Cooper guitarist Pete Friesen before the recording of their next album, Powertrippin'. Upon release the album peaked at number 22 on the British album charts.

Three singles were released from the album in multiple formats in 1991. "Free 'n' Easy" (promo CD, 12" vinyl, 7" vinyl, cassette), "Devil's Toy" (promo CD, 7" & 12" vinyl) and "Little Lost Sometimes" (promo CD, 12" & 7" vinyl).

The Japanese release of Soul Destruction included two bonus tracks, "Bodies", a Sex Pistols cover and an acoustic version of "Hell to Pay". Both of these tracks previously appeared as B-sides to various "Free 'n' Easy" singles in the UK.

The album was re-released by Spinefarm Records as a "Deluxe Edition" in 2015, including a second disc containing all of the single b-sides.

== Track listing ==
1. "Crucify" (Ricky Warwick) – 4:42
2. "Free 'N' Easy" (Floyd London, Warwick) – 4:24
3. "Joy Bang One Time" (London, Tantrum, Warwick) – 3:33
4. "Love Religion" (Del James, London, Warwick) – 4:41
5. "Bandaged Knees" (James, Warwick) – 6:11
6. "Praying to the Red Light" (Tantrum, Warwick) – 4:49
7. "Sin Against the Light" (Warwick) – 4:59
8. "Little Lost Sometimes" (Tantrum, Warwick) – 7:01
9. "Devil's Toy" (Warwick) – 5:23
10. "What More Do You Want" (James, Warwick) – 4:32
11. "Hell to Pay" (Warwick) – 4:47
12. "Loaded" (Warwick) – 3:32

=== Deluxe edition disc 2: Bonus tracks ===
1. "Free 'N' Easy" (7" Edit) – 4:22
2. "Bodies" (Sex Pistols cover) – 2:55
3. "Hell to Pay" (Acoustic Version) – 4:43
4. "Devil's Toy" (7" Edit) – 4:34
5. "Bad Temptation" – 4:32
6. "Loaded" (Live UK 1991) – 3:36
7. "Little Lost Sometimes" (Radio Edit) – 4:53
8. "Wild Road to Satisfaction" – 3:50
9. "Crucify" (Live UK 1991) – 4:56
10. "Detroit" (Live UK 1991) – 3:23
