= Mark Eddinger =

American musical artist (born 1958)

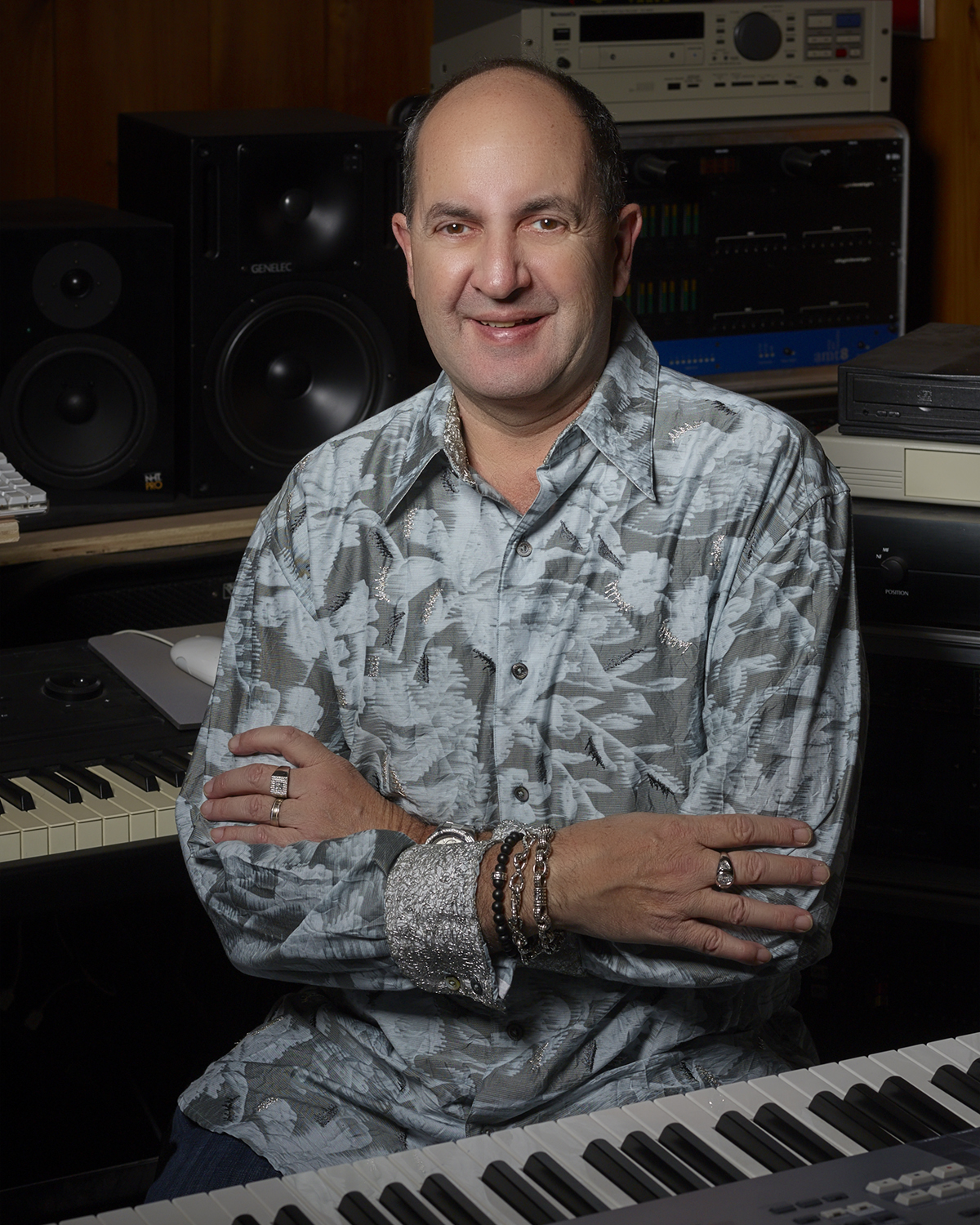
- Eddinger in his studio, 2017

Background information
- Born: December 11, 1958 (age 67); Santa Rosa, California, U.S.
- Genres: Rock, pop, jazz, R&B
- Occupations: Musician, producer, music executive
- Instruments: Piano, keyboards, synthesizers
- Years active: 1977–present
- Labels: Chrysalis Records, Warner Bros Records, InVision Records

Mark Eddinger is an American keyboardist, composer, arranger, music producer, record company executive, and music and entertainment industry consultant. Eddinger is also involved as an executive and consultant in other business sectors unrelated to the entertainment industry.

== Early years ==
Mark Eddinger was born in Santa Rosa, California on December 11, 1958. He began studying classical piano at the age of five under Frances Kelly, a student of classical composer Sergei Prokofiev. He continued his studies and competed in several young pianists competitions. Although unpopular in the strict classical music circles, Eddinger became interested in rock music and in particular analog synthesizers. While still studying under Kelly, and later with Sonoma County pianist Norma Brown, he began studying analog synthesizer programming with analog synthesizer pioneer Patrick Gleeson. In the summer of 1975 while traveling in England with a close friend, he met Peter Bardens of the band Camel and producer Alan Tarney, both of whom he would work with in later years.

== Business activities ==
While living in Las Vegas in 1977 and again in 1980 and 1981, Eddinger worked primarily as a musician and producer. He performed live with acts including Lola Falana and Sadler and Young, recorded with artists including Sam Butera and Doc Severinsen, and worked with producers including Brooks Arthur and George Richey. The bulk of his recording and production work during this period took place at Las Vegas Recording Studio, a facility owned by Hank Castro, Chips Davis (a pioneer of Live End – Dead End (LEDE) acoustic technology), and Mel and Sheila Godfrey. Eddinger was working at this studio during the time that Las Vegas Recording Studio was being developed into the Live End-Dead End prototype studio, and therefore was one of the first people to produce and record using this acoustic technology.

In early 1980, Eddinger co-founded Worldwide Entertainment, one of the premier independent promotion companies in the music industry. During his tenure with Worldwide, Eddinger created and directed regional promotional campaigns for over 30 artists including Aretha Franklin, Fleetwood Mac, Toto, Van Halen, David Bowie, Grateful Dead, Journey, AC/DC and Heart. The company was sold to WEA in the Fall of 1981, and Eddinger was retained by WEA as a consultant following the sale. He also worked briefly for Warner Bros. Records in 1982 and for Columbia Records in 1984. Eddinger moved to New York City late in 1984. Eddinger has served as president of two independent record labels, AudioTone Records from 1986 to 1988 and InVision Records in 2000. During his tenure with InVision, Eddinger signed Ray Charles to a multi-record deal. Eddinger has provided consulting services to a wide variety of companies in the music and entertainment industries including Sony Music, BMG, Warner Bros. Records, Universal Music Group, MCA Records, Warner/Chappell Music, ASCAP, and the RIAA, and has been a trusted advisor and consultant to many music industry executives, managers, attorneys and recording artists. He is a voting member of National Academy of Recording Arts and Sciences, a founding member of Digital Audio Consortium and a member of the Audio Engineering Society. He has conducted master classes at Berklee College of Music and the Juilliard School, and has taught graduate courses and seminars relating to the music industry at Brigham Young University, UCLA and NYU.

== Production, technology and live performance ==
Eddinger's original synthesizer programs have been used on thousands of recordings by artists including Michael Jackson, Celine Dion, Elton John, Stevie Wonder, Peter Gabriel, Herbie Hancock, Bryan Ferry, and Oasis. Over the past four plus decades his programs and samples have resided in keyboards and synthesizers manufactured by companies including New England Digital (Synclavier II), Moog, Oberheim, Kurzweil, Yamaha, ARP, and Roland. He has also made several contributions to the development of digital audio technology, including authoring algorithms, designing operating systems and consulting for companies including Akai, HHB Communications, Panasonic and Microboards.

Eddinger has played on more than 1,000 recordings by artists including Blues Traveler, Londonbeat, Butthole Surfers, Luciano Pavarotti, Bakers Pink, and Bill Champlin. Eddinger created original synth sounds, played keyboards and performed live percussion on the Butthole Surfers track "Pepper" from the album Electriclarryland which reached #1 on the Billboard Modern Rock Tracks chart in 1996. He has also performed on several U.S. and World tours with artists including Diana Ross, Sammy Davis Jr., Cliff Richard, Chaka Khan, Be-Bop Deluxe and Nazareth. He has produced over 35 albums, has written over 1,000 songs, and his music and productions have appeared on soundtracks for films including Silverado, Empire of the Sun and Celebrity. For his contributions as a musician, producer, arranger, programmer and industry executive, Eddinger has been the recipient of RIAA Gold and Platinum Awards commemorating the sales of over 50 million albums.

Since the mid 1980s, Eddinger has also spent considerable time developing and producing independent artists, many of whom have gone on to have regional or national success, including Sin River (featuring Russell Allen of Symphony X), Mobius Strip, Seventh Proof, The Apostle Ensemble, The Ben Shippee Band, and California surf band Aloha Radio in the Spring of 2011.

In 1987, Eddinger founded Star West Entertainment, and through this company has channeled his activities in consulting, publishing, licensing and artist development.

== 1990 to 2000 ==
During the 1990s, Eddinger consulted on behalf of labels of all sizes in global licensing and distribution of CD product, specializing in fostering legitimate distribution in Eastern Europe, former Soviet republics including Ukraine, Estonia, Latvia and Lithuania, and other markets in South and Central America and Asia where piracy was rampant. Eddinger was successful in negotiating licenses and creating new distribution chains for labels including Sony Music, BMG and Universal Music Group.

From 1991 to 1992, Eddinger hosted approximately 35 V.I.P. parties in a private room at New York City's China Club at its original location in the basement of the Beacon Theatre. These parties were regularly attended by celebrities of the music, film, television and sports world, and were followed by New York reporters including Joanna Molloy, Richard Johnson, and Flo Anthony. Artists who performed at the Beacon Theatre upstairs would often attend the parties following their performances.

== 2000 to present ==
Eddinger has played an active role in the creation, analysis and "re-tooling" of numerous digital music and digital media distribution models. Eddinger has consulted for major and independent labels, music publishers, motion picture companies, digital and physical content distributors, attorneys, government agencies, and public and private companies. Eddinger is also known for his expertise in worldwide licensing and has been responsible for licensing numerous recordings and music catalogs that have been marketed in the U.S. and in over 50 other countries.

In 2008, Eddinger co-produced the Bill Champlin CD ¨No Place Left To Fall¨. The record was released by JVC/Victor in Japan on November 5, 2008, along with a companion DVD documentary, was released in Europe by Zinc Music on December 10, 2008, and was released in the U.S. on August 4, 2009.

In May 2010, Eddinger assumed the role of North American business manager for the U.K. based dance and pop music production company Soulshaker and its related companies and production teams under the umbrella of Galactic Media. In April 2011, Eddinger accepted the position as Director of North American Operations for AudiofreaksMusic, a London-based music company specializing in promotion, management, production, publishing and licensing. Mark is also North American Business Affairs Manager for GoMusicSolutions, a highly successful Galactic Media Company specializing in International promotion and licensing campaigns for new and established artists in the pop, dance and club music genres.

In light of his wide range of experience and influence in the music industry, Eddinger has crossed paths with and been affiliated with many of the most successful artists in the history of modern music in genres ranging from jazz to pop and rock. Mark maintains close personal friendships with many of these artists.

Eddinger attended Santa Rosa Junior College, Fresno State University and Stanford University.

== Personal life ==
While on a consulting trip to Venezuela in 1994, Eddinger met his future wife Lena Brandwijk. They were married on September 14, 2001. Brandwijk graduated in 1994 with a master's degree in Organic Chemistry from Universidad Simon Bolivar in Caracas, Venezuela. Lena died on August 3, 2012.

On November 1, 2014, Eddinger married Kacey Lynn Seratt in a private ceremony in Central Park in New York City. On April 2, 2015, Eddinger and his wife Kacey welcomed the birth of Oliver Jack Eddinger, Eddinger's first child. Eddinger is stepfather to his wife Kacey's children Malik, Kadric and Landin.
