= List of festivals at Donington Park =

Since 1980, Donington Park has played host to many rock festivals. The venue, located near Castle Donington in central England has built itself a reputation as the 'spiritual home of British hard rock'. Though other festivals have taken place there, the two most notable were annual offerings of Monsters of Rock and Download Festival.

== History ==
=== Monsters of Rock: 1980 to 1996 ===
Monsters of Rock was the first major festival event at Donington Park. It was regular, with few cancellations throughout its run. In 1988, due to poor conditions, two fans were killed after being crushed to death during Guns N' Roses set. This led to the festival's first cancellation in 1989. Cancellation happened again in 1993, and in 1997. Plans for expanding the one-day festival into three days had been set out for 1997 before its cancellation.

After huge success in the 1980s, the early 1990s saw the festival face a slow decline. Difficulty to find a powerful headline act was the reason for the 1993 cancellation. In 1995, without a major act willing to play the festival was on the verge of being cancelled again. Metallica were persuaded to play, but the festival was to be called 'Escape from the Studio '95', with major contributions to the organisation by the band in exchange for their services.

==== Metallica Escape from the Studio '95 ====
Taking the place of a Monsters of Rock 1995 was a Metallica organised festival as part of their 'Escape from the Studio '95' tour. The show was considered the official Monsters of Rock 1995 show by bands playing, including Metallica. If the organisers of Monsters of Rock had not been struggling to find a headliner for the festival, they would not have allowed Metallica to present the festival as its own and controlled the event so much. In 1996, Monsters of Rock would return - for the last time. Their 'Escape from the Studio '06' festival tour also covered the venue, arriving at the Download Festival though this was not a Metallica organised festival.

=== One Step Beyond (1992) ===
In July 1992 the dance organization Fantazia held a legal rave at the park. Official figures state 25,000 in attendance, though it is known by authorities that several thousand more gained entrance, making it the largest event of its kind in the UK. With a stage decorated as a castle, One Step Beyond hosted over 60 DJ's producing several live albums and an official live DVD.

=== A Day at the Races (2001) ===
To promote their new album, Just Enough Education to Perform, Stereophonics staged a two-day festival called "A Day at the Races" with the first day at Donington and the second at Cardiff's Millennium Stadium. The concerts were supported by Ash, Black Crowes, Proud Mary and The Crocketts with the latter venue performance being released on DVD.

=== Rock and Blues Festival (2001) ===
A two-day event was held in 2001 featuring blues rock bands for the most part. It was aimed at an older audience who would have been around during the genre's heyday which had ended at the dawn of the 1990s. The Saturday saw Hawkwind playing with Meat Loaf, Eddie and the Hot Rods and Stone while the Sunday saw UFO and Uli Jon Roth playing with Wishbone Ash, Company Of Snakes (a band featuring ex-members of Whitesnake), and Deborah Bonham (sister of the late Led Zeppelin drummer John Bonham).

=== Ozzfest 2002 ===
The largely America-based tour, organized by Ozzy Osbourne and wife, Sharon Osbourne, first brought the festival to the UK in 1998 but it was not until 2002 that the event was held at Donington featuring two stages on one day. The main stage was located in the traditional position inside the circuit with the second stage being located inside the exhibition hall. Ozzfest 2002 was headlined by Ozzy but did not return to Donington until 2005 when the festival cooperated with Live Nation UK to make the Download Festival a three-day event, which saw Ozzy once again headline this time with Black Sabbath.

=== Download Festival 2003 to present ===
After the decline of British hard rock music in the early 90s in the face of grunge rock, and with the late 90s rise of synthetic pop music further hampering the genre, Monsters of Rock had been forced to stop. Promoters were wary of booking two large rock festivals, fearing customers would be spread between Donington and the Ozzfest. When proposed Ozzfests were cancelled to continue their more lucrative US run, fans were left with nothing. By 2003 however, hard rock was growing again and Live Nation decided to resurrect the Monsters of Rock of old, under a new name - Download Festival. The festival was a runaway success, and lasted followed 1997's plans to extend Monsters of Rock to two days rather than the single day Monsters of Rock always had. The festival continues to this day.

In 2005, when the Ozzfest tour decided to perform at Donington it picked a Saturday in the middle of Download Festival. Following this, Download has always been a three-day event. See notes on Ozzfest below.

== 1980s ==
| Year | Date | Event | Days | Stages | Acts | Attendance | Recordings |
|---|---|---|---|---|---|---|---|
| 1980 | 16 August | Monsters of Rock | 1 day | 1 stage | 8 bands | 36,000 | Judas Priest - Donington '80; Rainbow - Monsters of Rock; Saxon - Donnington: The Live Tracks |
| 1981 | 22 August | Monsters of Rock | 1 day | 1 stage | 6 bands | 65,000 | Blackfoot - "Dry County/Hard To Handle" (Single) |
| 1982 | 21 August | Monsters of Rock | 1 day | 1 stage | 6 bands | 34,000 | |
| 1983 | 20 August | Monsters of Rock | 1 day | 1 stage | 6 bands | 40,000 | Dio - At Donington UK: Live 1983 & 1987; Whitesnake - Live in Donington 1983 (DVD) |
| 1984 | 18 August | Monsters of Rock | 1 day | 1 stage | 7 bands | 65,000 | |
| 1985 | 17 August | ZZ Top: Rocking the Castle | 1 day | 1 stage | 6 bands | 50,000 | |
| 1986 | 16 August | Monsters of Rock | 1 day | 1 stage | 6 bands | 40,000 | Motörhead - Rock 'n' Roll (2006 reissue) |
| 1987 | 22 August | Monsters of Rock | 1 day | 1 stage | 6 bands | 66,000 | Anthrax - Caught in a Mosh: BBC Live in Concert; Dio - At Donington UK: Live 1983 & 1987 |
| 1988 | 20 August | Monsters of Rock | 1 day | 1 stage | 6 bands | 107,000 | Guns N' Roses - Paradise City (video); Iron Maiden - The Clairvoyant (single), BBC Archives |

== 1990s ==
| Year | Date | Event | Days | Stages | Acts | Attendance | Recordings |
|---|---|---|---|---|---|---|---|
| 1990 | 18 August | Monsters of Rock | 1 day | 1 stage | 5 bands | 72,500 | Thunder - Live at Donington: Monsters of Rock 1990; Whitesnake - Live at Donington 1990 |
| 1991 | 17 August | Monsters of Rock | 1 day | 1 stage | 5 bands | 72,500 | AC/DC - Live at Donington (DVD) |
| 1992 | 25–26 July | One Step Beyond | 24 hours | 1 stage | 60+ DJ's | 28,000 | |
| 1992 | 22 August | Monsters of Rock | 1 day | 1 stage | 6 bands | 68,500 | Iron Maiden - Live at Donington; The Almighty - Powertrippin'; W.A.S.P. - The Crimson Idol (1998 reissue) |
| 1994 | 4 June | Monsters of Rock | 1 day | 2 stages | 12 bands | 55,000 | |
| 1995 | 26 August | Metallica: Escape from the Studio | 1 day | 1 stage | 9 bands | 65,000 | Metallica - Until It Sleeps (single) |
| 1996 | 17 August | Monsters of Rock | 1 day | 2 stages | 13 bands | 50,000 | KISS - Off the Soundboard: Live at Donington 1996 |

== 2000s ==
| Year | Date | Event | Days | Stages | Acts | Attendance | Recordings |
|---|---|---|---|---|---|---|---|
| 2001 | 23 June | Rock & Blues Festival | 2 days | 1 stage | 6 bands | | Uli Jon Roth - Legends of Rock at Castle Donington |
| 2001 | 14 July | A Day at the Races | 1 day | 1 stage | 5 bands | | |
| 2002 | 25 May | Ozzfest 2002 | 1 day | 2 stages | 24 bands | | |
| 2003 | 31 May - 1 June | Download Festival ft. Deconstruction Festival | 2 days | 2 stages | 57 bands | | Metallica - Frantic (single) |
| 2004 | 5–6 June | Download Festival | 2 days | 3 stages | 73 bands | | |
| 2005 | 10–12 June | Download Festival with Ozzfest | 3 days | 3 stages | 99 bands | | |
| 2006 | 9–11 June | Download Festival | 3 days | 4 stages | 106 bands | | |
| 2007 | 8–10 June | Download Festival | 3 days | 3 stages | 101 bands | | Lamb of God - Walk with Me in Hell |
| 2008 | 13–15 June | Download Festival | 3 days | 3 stages | 100 bands | | |
| 2009 | 14–16 June | Download Festival | 3 days | 4 stages | 132 bands. | 80,000 | Slipknot - (sic)nesses (DVD) |

== 2010s ==
| Year | Date | Event | Days | Stages | Acts | Attendance | Recordings |
|---|---|---|---|---|---|---|---|
| 2010 | 11–13 June | Download Festival | 3 days | 5 stages (+ AC/DC stage) | 100+ | | |
| 2011 | 10–12 June | Download Festival | 3 days | 5 stages | 100+ | | |
| 2012 | 8–10 June | Download Festival | 3 days | 5 stages | 100+ | | |
| 2013 | 14–16 June | Download Festival | 3 days | 5 stages | 100+ | | |
| 2014 | 13-15 June | Download Festival | 3 days | 5 stages | 100+ | | Rocks Donington |
| 2015 | 12-14 June | Download Festival | 3 days | 5 stages | 100+ | | |
| 2016 | 10-12 June | Download Festival | 3 days | 4 stages | 100+ | | |
| 2017 | 9-11 June | Download Festival | 3 days | 4 Stages | 100+ | | |
| 2018 | 8-10 June | Download Festival | 3 days | 4 Stages | 100+ | | |
| 2019 | 14-16 June | Download Festival | 3 days | 4 Stages | 100+ | | |
| 2020 | 12-14 June | Download Festival | 3 days | 4 Stages | 100+ | | |

== 2020s ==
| Year | Date | Event | Days | Stages | Acts | Attendance | Recordings | Notes |
|---|---|---|---|---|---|---|---|---|
| 2020 | 12–14 June | Download Festival | 3 days | 5 stages | 100+ | | | Cancelled due to the COVID-19 pandemic |
| 2021 | 4–6 June | Download Festival | 3 Days | 5 stages | 100+ | | | Cancelled due to the COVID-19 pandemic |
| 2022 | 10–12 June | Download Festival | 3 Days | 5 stages | 100+ | | | |
| 2023 | 8-11 June | Download Festival | 4 Days | 5 stages | 100+ | 100,000+ | | Metallica headlined two nights as part of their M72 World Tour |
| 2024 | 14-16 June | Download Festival | 3 Days | 5 stages | 100+ | | | |
| 2025 | 13-15 June | Download Festival | 3 Days | 5 stages | 100+ | 75,000+ | | First time headlined by Korn, and by Sleep Token |

== See also ==
- Download Festival
- Monsters of Rock
- Ozzfest 2002
