= The Almighty (album) =

Studio album by The Almighty
- Released: June 2000
- Recorded: 2000 at Foel Studios, Wales
- Genre: hard rock, heavy metal
- Length: 44:55
- Label: Sanctuary Records Group
- Producer: Ronan McHugh and The Almighty

The Almighty chronology
Just Add Life (1996)	The Almighty (2000)	Psycho-Narco (2001)

Professional ratings
Review scores
Source	Rating
AllMusic	0/5 stars

The Almighty is the self-titled sixth studio album by Scottish rock band The Almighty. The cover art was designed by "Koot". Floyd London contributed the bass guitar parts on this recording, even though he had left the band some time previously.

== Track listing ==
All songs written by Ricky Warwick except as indicated

1. "Broken Machine" (Parsons) – 4:01
2. "I'm In Love (With Revenge)" – 3:42
3. "La Chispa de la Muerte" – 3:51
4. "Big Black Automatic" – 4:00
5. "For Fuck's Sake" – 4:48
6. "Poison Eyes" – 3:21
7. "White Anger Comedown" (Warwick/D. James) – 3:19
8. "TNT" (Parsons) – 3:09
9. "Stop" (Parsons) – 2:52
10. "USAK-47" – 3:30
11. "Alright" (Warwick/Parsons) – 3:25
12. "Barfly" (Parsons) – 2:13
13. "Fat Chance" (Warwick/Parsons) – 2:44

== Personnel ==
The Almighty

- Ricky Warwick – vocals, guitars
- Nick Parsons – guitars
- Stump Munroe – drums, percussion, vocals
- Floyd London – bass guitar, vocals

Production

- Ronan McHugh and The Almighty – producer
- Recorded at Foel Studios, Wales
- Mixed at Joe's Garage, Dublin, Ireland
- Mastered by Simon Heyworth at Chop 'em Out, London, England
