= Blood, Fire & Live =

Live album by The Almighty
- Released: 8 October 1990
- Recorded: July 1990 in Edinburgh and Nottingham
- Genre: Hard rock
- Length: 35:58
- Label: Polydor
- Producer: John Cornfield and The Almighty

The Almighty chronology
Blood, Fire & Love (1989)	Blood, Fire & Live (1990)	Soul Destruction (1991)

Blood, Fire & Live is the first live album by Scottish rock band The Almighty, recorded on their "Wild and Wonderful" tour in July 1990 and released in October that year. The title, and defaced album cover itself, is a pun on their first album which immediately preceded it (Blood, Fire & Love). All of the tracks, except "You Ain't Seen Nothin' Yet" which is a cover of a Bachman–Turner Overdrive song, appeared on that first album too. The album was re-released by Spinefarm Records in 2015 as the second disc in a three-disc deluxe edition of Blood, Fire & Love.

== Track listing ==
All songs written by Ricky Warwick, except as indicated.

1. "Full Force Lovin' Machine" (London, Warwick, Munroe, Tantrum) – 3:51
2. "You've Gone Wild" – 4:01
3. "Lay Down the Law" (Warwick, Tantrum) – 4:15
4. "Blood, Fire and Love" – 4:52
5. "Destroyed" – 3:50
6. "Wild and Wonderful" (London, Warwick) – 7:53
7. "Resurrection Mutha" (Warwick, Tantrum) – 3:36
8. "You Ain't Seen Nothin' Yet" (Randy Bachman) – 3:40 (Bachman–Turner Overdrive cover)

== Personnel ==
The Almighty

- Ricky Warwick – vocals, guitars
- Tantrum – guitars
- Stump Munroe – drums, percussion, vocals
- Floyd London – bass

Production

- Co-produced, engineered, mixed by, recorded by – John Cornfield
- Mastered by – Arun Chakraverty
- Live sound mixed by – Martin Walker
- Co-producer – The Almighty
- Recorded by [assistants] – Alan Stone, Ian Bridges
