= Blood, Fire & Love =

Studio album by The Almighty
- Released: 1989
- Recorded: April and July 1989 at Abbey Road 2 (London, Sawmills), Cornwall and A.I.R. (London)
- Genre: Hard rock
- Length: 45:14
- Label: Polydor
- Producer: John Williams

The Almighty chronology
Blood, Fire & Love (1989)	Blood, Fire & Live (1991)

Professional ratings
Review scores
Source	Rating
AllMusic	2/5 stars

Blood, Fire & Love is the first studio album by Scottish rock band The Almighty, released in 1989. A three-disc deluxe edition was released by Spinefarm Records in 2015, including the Blood, Fire & Live album on the second disc, and all of the B-sides from the various singles on disc three.

== Track listing ==
1. "Resurrection Mutha" – 4:56
2. "Destroyed" – 3:43
3. "Wild & Wonderful" – 4:58
4. "Blood, Fire & Love" – 5:46
5. "Gift Horse" – 3:38
6. "You've Gone Wild" – 3:59
7. "Lay Down the Law" – 4:01
8. "Power" – 3:58
9. "Full Force Lovin' Machine" – 3:45
10. "Detroit" – 3:23
11. "New Love Sensation" – 3:03

=== 2014 deluxe edition disc 2: Blood, Fire & Live ===
1. "Full Force Lovin' Machine"
2. "You've Gone Wild"
3. "Lay Down the Law"
4. "Blood, Fire & Love"
5. "Destroyed"
6. "Wild & Wonderful"
7. "Resurrection Mutha"
8. "You Ain't Seen Nothin' Yet"

=== 2014 deluxe edition disc 3: Bonus tracks ===
1. "Destroyed (Demo)"
2. "Lay Down the Law (Demo)"
3. "Full Force Lovin' Machine (Demo)"
4. "Destroyed (Radio Version)"
5. "Love Me to Death"
6. "Blood, Fire & Love (Metal Version)"
7. "Wild & Wonderful (Live)"
8. "Lay Down the Law (Live)"
9. "Power (Killer Watt Mix)"
10. "Power (Live)"
11. "Power (Dub Mix)"
12. "Thunderbird"
13. "Good God Almighty"
14. "Power (Friday Night Rock Show)"
15. "Wild & Wonderful (Friday Night Rock Show)"
16. "Destroyed (Friday Night Rock Show)"
17. "Thunderbird (Friday Night Rock Show)"

== Personnel ==
The Almighty

- Ricky Warwick – lead vocals, rhythm and acoustic guitars
- Tantrum – lead and rhythm guitars, backing vocals
- Stump Munroe – drums, backing vocals, percussion
- Floyd London – bass, backing vocals, acoustic guitar

Guest musicians

- James Taylor – Hammond organ on "Wild & Wonderful" and "Detroit", piano on "Blood, Fire & Love"
- Adam Peters – organ on "Resurrection Mutha"
- Anne Dudley – string arrangement on "Blood, Fire & Love"
