= The Front (band) =

American rock band

- The Front

Background information
- Origin: Kansas City, Missouri United States
- Genres: Rock; hard rock; alternative rock
- Years active: 1984–1992
- Label: Columbia
- Spinoffs: Bakers Pink; Michael Moon
- Past members: Michael Anthony Franano; Bobby Franano; Mike Greene; Randy Jordan; Shane Miller
- Website: http://thefrontband.net

The Front was an American rock band, originally formed in 1984 in Kansas City, Missouri, who enjoyed a brief popularity in the late 1980s and early 1990s.

Although originally offered a recording contract in 1987 with Sire/Warner Brothers Records, The Front signed an exclusive management contract with Scott and Doc McGhee of McGhee Entertainment, the team behind Bon Jovi, Mötley Crüe, Scorpions and Skid Row. A bidding war began with The Front ultimately signing with CBS Records in 1989. They released one eponymous, full-length album on Columbia Records, produced by Grammy Award-winning music studio engineer Andy Wallace with two singles released: "Fire" and "Le Motion".

Their first release, "Fire", peaked at No. 29 on The Billboard Rock chart in 1990 and was a minor radio hit, and the corresponding video was in stress rotation on MTV by January 1990. The Front toured the U.S. with many acts of the period including Bang Tango, Jason Bonham, Enuff Z'nuff and Alice Cooper. In the spring of 1990, The Front toured Europe with Lenny Kravitz and headlined dates in Berlin and Düsseldorf, Germany when Lenny returned to the states with throat problems. The Front ended 1990 returning to Europe as a featured artist on the Monsters of Rock Tour with notable headlining acts Aerosmith and Whitesnake. Dates included August 25, 1990 at Dortmund, Westfalenhalle, and September 1, 1990 in Mannheim, Maimarktgelände Eisstadion.

The Front was the first act to be a featured artist on both MTV's Headbangers Ball and 120 Minutes on the same weekend—essentially the template for alternative rock that would be huge a couple of years later. The Front is also the last major artist to release a vinyl 45 RPM record on Columbia Records.

In 1992, The Front and CBS split ways; the band and management believed that The Front were no longer a priority for the label. CBS agreed to let the band move to their sister label, Epic Records, keeping the group in the Sony family. The Front recorded their next record with producer Mark Dodson, which was released under the name Bakers Pink, a name change requested by Epic Records.

== Band members ==
- Michael Anthony Franano – lead vocals, guitar
- Mike Greene – lead & rhythm guitars
- Randy Jordan – bass guitar, backing vocals (died 1998)
- Bobby Franano – keyboards
- Shane Miller – drums

== Discography ==
The Front, The Front

=== Albums ===
The Front (1989, Columbia Records)

- US chart peak: 118

Label: CBS – CK 45260, Columbia – CK 45260
Format: CD, cassette, vinyl LP
Country: US
Released: 1989
Genre: Rock
International: CBS 466143 1 (LP) and 466143 2 (CD)

The Front - Live In New York City 1990 (2012)
Format: CD, digital download
Country: US
Released: 2012
Genre: Rock/Alternative

=== Singles ===
- "Fire" (1989, Columbia Records)
  US chart peak: 29
- "Le Motion" (1990, Columbia Records)

== See also ==
- Michael Moon
