= Michael Anthony Franano =

American singer-songwriter

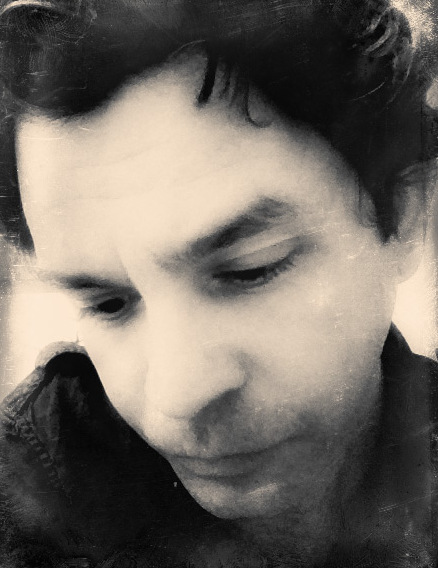
- Michael Anthony Franano

Background information
- Origin: Kansas City, Missouri, New York City
- Genres: Singer-songwriter, Rock, alternative rock, acoustic, pop rock
- Years active: 1984–present
- Labels: Columbia, Epic, Mutiny

Michael Anthony Franano (born 1964) is an American rock singer/songwriter and musician known for his work in the hard rock and alternative genres.

== History ==
In 1989–90, Michael Anthony Franano achieved commercial success as singer/songwriter of The Front, a band originally from Kansas City, Missouri. After the CBS release of their self-titled album, and single, Fire reached number 29 on the Billboard Rock charts. He has since released two more albums. The first was after The Front changed their name to Bakers Pink and released a self-titled album on Epic Records in 1993. He released a solo album in 1998 on Mutiny Records under the name Michael Moon. The Michael Moon Band (credited as Michael Moon/El Flamingo Band) had a cameo appearance in the Woody Allen / Miramax film, Celebrity, performing the single Chanel No. 5 in a club scene while Kenneth Branagh dances with Charlize Theron. Michael is also credited for writing, composing and performing the music on Lynn's Wake, an independent film and Winner of the Best Short Screenplay in the Atlantic City Film Festival in 1999, as well as writing songs featured in the television shows Party of Five and Melrose Place.

== Discography ==
=== Studio albums ===
Year	Album (artist)	US	RIAA certification
1989	The Front (The Front)	118	
1993	Bakers Pink (Bakers Pink)	–	–
1998	You (Michael Moon)	–	–
2012	The Front Live in New York City 1990 (The Front)	–	–

=== Singles ===
Year	Single (artist)	Chart positions		
Year	Single (artist)	US Hot 100	US Main Rock	UK
1989	Fire (The Front)	–	29	–
1990	Le Motion (The Front)	–	–	–
1993	Watercolours (Bakers Pink)	–	–	–
1998	Chanel No. 5 (Michael Moon)	–	–	–
