= Belfast Confetti (album) =

Studio album by Ricky Warwick
- Released: May 2009
- Recorded: Echo Park Music and Sound, Los Angeles
- Genre: Folk rock, Heartland rock, Americana
- Length: 46:13
- Label: DR2 Records
- Producer: Ricky Warwick, Tim Boland, Tom Vitorino

Ricky Warwick chronology
Love Many, Trust Few (2005)	Belfast Confetti (2009)

Belfast Confetti is the third solo studio album by Ricky Warwick, the frontman for The Almighty and Black Star Riders. It was released in May 2009 on DR2 Records, and was produced by Warwick, Tim Boland and Tom Vitorino. It takes its name from the slang term "Belfast confetti", referring to the large screws, bolts, and metal shop scrap used by rioters.

== Writing ==
Warwick began writing Belfast Confetti following the release of the "Love Owes" EP which saw Warwick's style begin to transition from an electric guitar blend of rock and Americana to a much more acoustic guitar based approach.

All tracks on Belfast Confetti were written by Warwick with additional help of Irish singer-songwriter Kieran Goss on Born Fightin' and Can't Hurt a Fool.

== Recording ==
The album was recorded Echo Park Music and Sound, Los Angeles, with additional recording taking place at Homebound and Doghouse Studios, Co Antrim.

== Track listing ==
- All tracks written by Ricky Warwick and Tom Vitorino, except where stated.
1. "Can't Wait for Tomorrow" (Warwick, Frankie Lee Drennen) – 3:04
2. "The Arms of Belfast Town" (Warwick) – 3:10
3. "Throwin' Dirt" – 4:32
4. "Thousands Are Leaving" – 4:10
5. "Hanks Blues" – 2:50
6. "Belfast Confetti" – 4:53
7. "Angel of Guile" – 4:13
8. "Punchin' Thunder" – 4:00
9. "Born Fightin'" (Warwick, Kieran Goss) – 4:28
10. "Can't Hurt a Fool" (Warwick, Goss) – 3:59
11. "If You're Gonna Bleed (Wear Black)" – 6:52

== Personnel ==
- Ricky Warwick – lead vocals, guitar, bass guitar, mandolin, harmonica
- Tom Vitorino – piano, guitar, harmonica, backing vocals
- Frankie Lee Drennen – mandolin, harmonica, backing vocals
- Gary Sullivan – drums, percussion
- Kieran Goss – acoustic guitar
- Luke Halpin – fiddle, mandolin
- Martin Crossan – uilleann pipes, tin whistles
- Chris Logan – 5-string banjo
- Ian 'Buck' Murdock – backing vocals

=== Production ===
- Mastering – Mark Chalecki at Little Red Book Mastering, Los Angeles
- Photography – Mark Hylands
- Artwork – Alex Galloway
- Graphics and layout – Michael Surtees

== Additional information ==
Several months prior to the release of Belfast Confetti, the record's first single "The Arms Of Belfast Town" was performed live in November 2008 by Warwick at half-time during an international football game between his home country Northern Ireland and Hungary. The song was then endorsed by the Irish Football Association in 2009 and later in the same year adopted by Warwick's favourite team, Glentoran, as their music played before the team take to the field. "The Arms Of Belfast Town" received considerable radio airplay in Northern Ireland.

After playing a full supporting solo tour of acoustic performances, Warwick joined fellow Irishmen Therapy? as main support act on their Crooked Timber tour where Warwick continued to perform and promote Belfast Confetti.
