= Michael Moon (band) =

- Michael Moon

Background information
- Origin: New York, New York, United States
- Genres: Rock, pop rock, alternative rock
- Years active: 1997–present
- Labels: Mutiny Records, Warner Bros. Records, Sire Records
- Spinoff of: The Front, Bakers Pink

The Michael Moon Band was an American, New York–based alternative rock group, active in the late 1990s. Michael Moon was the stage name for Michael Anthony Franano. Franano, formerly from the bands The Front and Bakers Pink and The Michael Moon Band released one pop album in 1998 titled, You. The Michael Moon Band made a cameo appearance under the name Michael Moon/El Flamingo Band in the Woody Allen / Miramax film, Celebrity, performing the single "Chanel No. 5" in a club scene while Kenneth Branagh dances with Charlize Theron. Franano was also credited for writing, composing and performing the music on Lynn's Wake, an independent film and winner of the Best Short Screenplay in the Atlantic City Film Festival in 1999.

== Band members ==
- Michael Moon (Franano) – Vocals, Guitars, drum programming
- Murphy Occhino – Drums, Vocals

=== Additional personnel ===
- Mark Eddinger – Piano, Keyboards
- Andy Burton – Keyboards
- Chris DeLisa – Drums

== Discography ==
You, Michael Moon

=== Albums ===
- You, (1998, Mutiny Records)

Release Date: Nov 03, 1998
Format: CD
Record Label: Mutiny Records
UPC: 600238001925
Genre: Rock
