= Psycho-Narco =

Studio album by The Almighty
- Released: 24 Jun 2001
- Recorded: 2001 at Parkgate Studios, Sussex
- Genre: Hard rock, heavy metal
- Length: 45:40
- Label: Sanctuary Records Group
- Producer: Daniel Rey

The Almighty chronology
The Almighty (2000)	Psycho-Narco (2001)

Professional ratings
Review scores
Source	Rating
AllMusic	0/5 stars

Psycho-Narco is the seventh studio album by Scottish rock band The Almighty. It peaked at number 35 on the UK Rock Chart in November 2001.

== Track listing ==
All songs written by Ricky Warwick except as indicated

1. "Galvanise" – 3:31
2. "427 Freak Horsepower" – 3:52
3. "Ruse" – 4:30
4. "Soul on a Roll" (Parsons) – 3:11
5. "Begging" (Warwick/James) – 2:59
6. "Hate the World" (Parsons) – 3:00
7. "Waiting for Earthquakes" – 4:58
8. "If I Knew What I Wanted" – 2:43
9. "7x" – 3:27
10. "Big Idea Idiot" (Parsons) – 1:56
11. "Mondo Balordo" – 3:40
12. "Blowout Kit (For the Underdog)" (Parsons) – 2:31
13. "Witness Relocation Programme" – 3:01
14. "Million Times Nothing" – 2:21

== Personnel ==
The Almighty

- Ricky Warwick – vocals, guitars
- Nick Parsons – guitars
- Stump Munroe – drums, percussion, vocals
- Gav Gray – bass

Additional musicians

- Dan Turner – additional vocals
- Andy Cairns – additional vocals
- Joe Elliott – additional vocals

Production

- Produced and engineered by Daniel Rey
- Recorded at Parkgate Studios, Sussex
- Mixed by Daniel Rey at Greene Street Studios, New York City
- Mastered by Howie Weinberg at Masterdisk, New York City
