= Ricky Warwick =

Northern Irish singer and guitarist

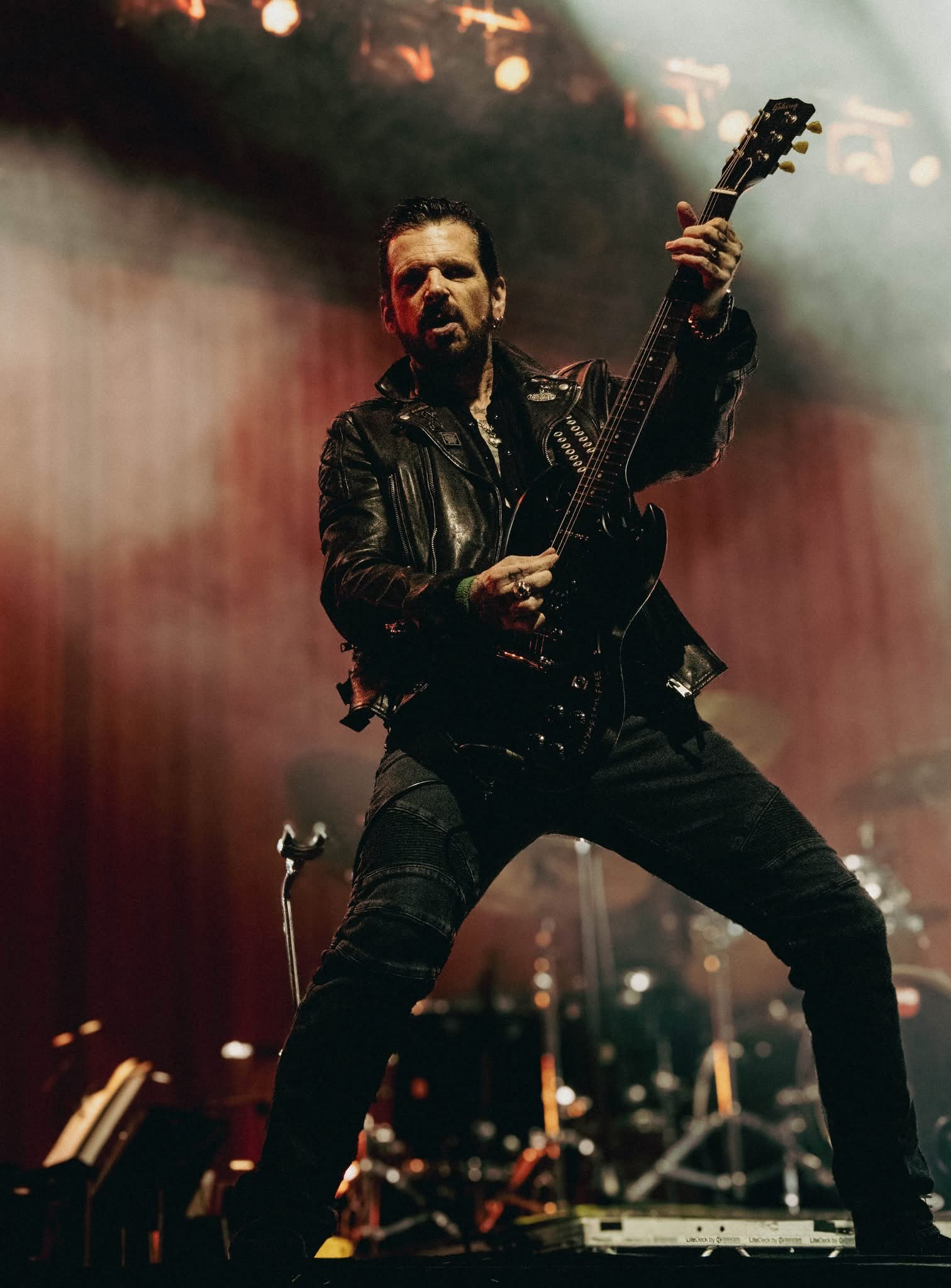
- Warwick performing in 2026

Background information
- Born: 11 July 1966 (age 60); Newtownards, County Down, Northern Ireland
- Genres: Hard rock, heavy metal
- Occupations: Musician, songwriter
- Instruments: Vocals, guitar
- Years active: 1988–present
- Label: Earache Records · Nuclear Blast
- Member of: The Almighty · Thin Lizzy · Black Star Riders · Ricky Warwick & The Fighting Hearts
- Formerly of: Circus Diablo
- Website: www.rickywarwick.com

Ricky Warwick (born 11 July 1966) is a Northern Irish musician and the lead singer of the rock bands Black Star Riders and Thin Lizzy. He is also the frontman for the Scottish hard rock band The Almighty, with whom he achieved chart success in the UK throughout the 1990s. Warwick has released several solo albums, performed with a variety of other bands and artists, and fronts his own band, The Fighting Hearts, to showcase his solo material.

== Early life ==
Warwick was born in Newtownards, County Down, where he spent his formative years, and got his first guitar at 14 years old. He was soon playing along to songs by various rock and country acts such as Bruce Springsteen, Bob Dylan and Johnny Cash. Warwick quickly migrated to the music of more harder-edged acts such as Motörhead, MC5, Stiff Little Fingers and The Clash. He later reminisced that "Those artists gave me a voice", adding that "...when no one would listen to a fourteen year old boy, they gave me something important to say." A year after, he moved with his family to Strathaven in Scotland. He first met his future bandmates Stump Monroe and Floyd London at his new school in Scotland.

== Career ==
Warwick got his first break in the late 1980s, when he was invited to join New Model Army as a rhythm guitarist on their The Ghost of Cain album world tour. He states that he learnt a great deal about songwriting and stagecraft during his time with the band. Warwick then left New Model Army and formed The Almighty in 1988 with guitarist Andy 'Tantrum' McCafferty and Warwick's former school-friends, drummer Stump Monroe and bass guitarist Floyd London. Warwick was the lead vocalist and played guitar in various formats of the band. Although all four founding members had a strong background in punk rock music, The Almighty took a more heavy metal/hard rock orientated musical direction.

The early 1990s saw The Almighty tour extensively throughout the UK and Europe as support to major rock acts such as Motörhead, Megadeth, Alice Cooper, Iron Maiden and Metallica. The band also later toured as headliners in their own right. Five studio albums and one live album were released by The Almighty during this time, which were well received by rock fans throughout the UK and in Europe. They were, however, unable to break through in the United States despite touring there in 1993. That same year, Warwick also performed with The Stiff Little Fingers at a gig at the Barrowlands in Glasgow. A live album showcasing that gig from March 1993, Pure Fingers, was released in 1995.

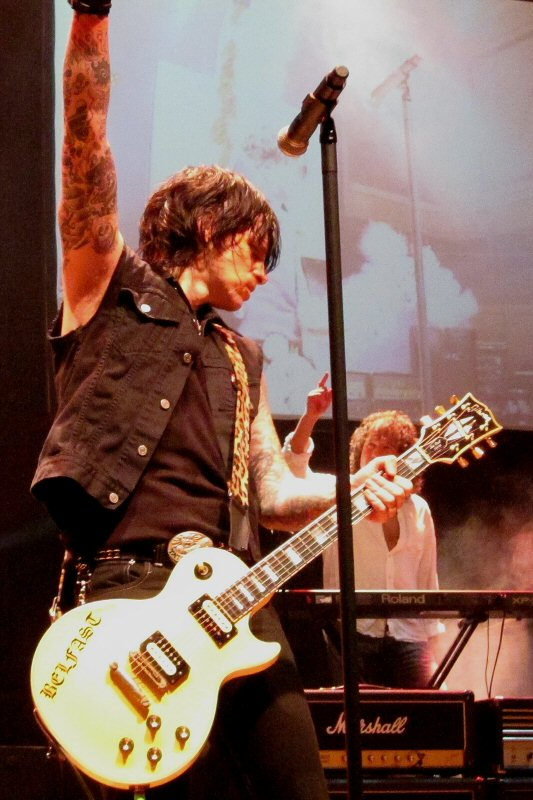
Warwick in 2011

In 1996, disillusioned with the direction The Almighty were taking Warwick moved to Dublin where he formed a new band called (sic) with Ciaran McGoldrick (bass) and Gary Sullivan (drums). The band's one record, I Feel So Lonely I Could Die, was only released in Japan, although a four-track EP came out in the UK. (sic) broke up in 1999 and then Warwick returned to The Almighty. The Almighty then released two further albums before again disbanding in 2001.

After the second break-up of The Almighty, Warwick admits he felt like quitting performing altogether. Instead, he went on tour in 2002 as a solo artist and, taking on board his fondness for country music and Americana, he played acoustically. The tour reinvigorated Warwick's love of music, and he began writing songs for a new album.

Warwick's first solo album, Tattoos & Alibis, was released in October 2003. Almost entirely acoustic, it was a marked departure from the raucous hard rock of The Almighty. A follow-up album was released in January 2006, Love Many Trust Few, which was similar in style to his solo debut although slightly more hard-rock orientated.

In January 2006 The Almighty reformed with their 'classic' line-up of Warwick, Stump, Floyd and Pete for benefit shows. Later in the year, they appeared as headliners at the 2006 Bulldog Bash and then undertook a 5 show tour of the UK in December 2006. During the same year, Warwick also joined the band Circus Diablo, along with Billy Duffy (of The Cult). The band recorded one album and performed at Ozzfest during 2007, but are no longer active.

He has in the past toured the British Isles and throughout Europe supporting Bob Dylan, Sheryl Crow and Mina Caputo.

Warwick will make his acting debut in an independent film written and directed by Bobby Field. Entitled The Bridge, filming is set to begin in mid 2017. The cast features several other rock musicians including Joe Elliott, Al Jourgensen (Ministry) and Joey Santiago (The Pixies).

In April 2009, Warwick released his third solo album, Belfast Confetti, continuing in the largely acoustic guitar based approach of his previous two solo albums.

Metalriot.com's Morgan Y. Evans wrote of Warwick's 2021 solo single "You're My Rock'N'Roll" that it ,"...is an infectious yet street-wise song that feels like what it means to live for rock, a punk-tinged power anthem that brings to mind working class, scab knuckled hands wiping down the bar to start all over again. It's the sort of song that would make the Social Distortions and Rose Tattoos of the world proud, a fine tribute to the many faces known and unknown behind the genre's glory and ongoing legacy."

=== Thin Lizzy and Black Star Riders ===
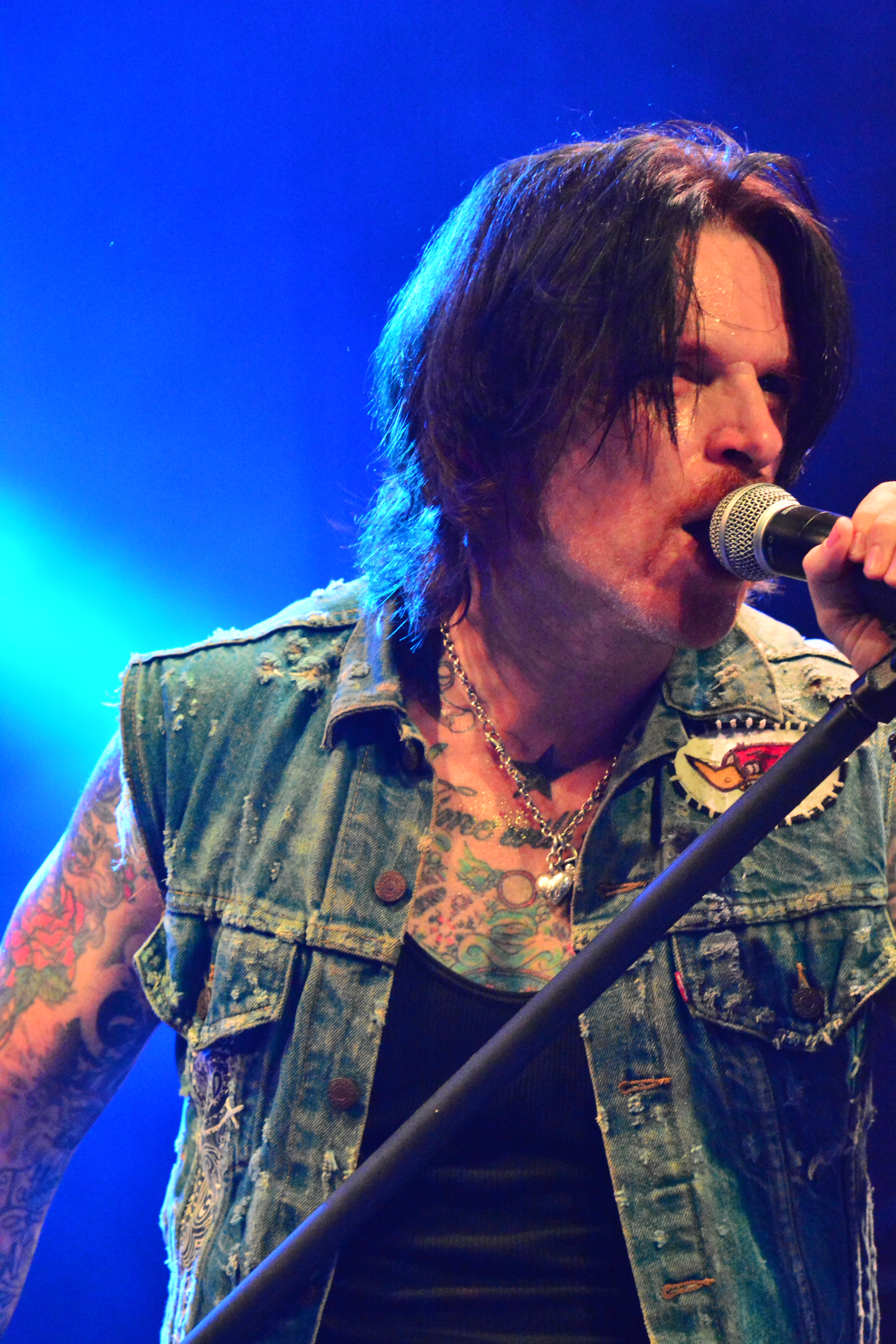
Warwick performing in 2014

In September 2009, Warwick was invited to join the latest lineup of Thin Lizzy and joined them as lead vocalist and guitarist. Warwick took part in Thin Lizzy's 2011 European tour commemorating 25 years since the death of original frontman Phil Lynott. In December 2012, he co-founded the Thin Lizzy spin-off band, Black Star Riders in order to release new material largely composed by Warwick with guitarist Damon Johnson. Black Star Riders' first album All Hell Breaks Loose was released in May 2013.

In 2014, Warwick recorded a second album with the Black Star Riders. Titled The Killer Instinct, the album was released on 20 February 2015. Alongside his touring commitments with Black Star Riders in 2015, Warwick toured the UK with his bandmate Damon Johnson, performing acoustic sets of Thin Lizzy and Black Star Riders songs, plus various covers and selections of Almighty and solo material. He also recorded an album of covers titled Stairwell Troubadour, again through PledgeMusic.

During 2016 and early 2017, Warwick and Thin Lizzy performed a small number of shows to commemorate the 40th anniversary of the band's breakthrough hit album, Jailbreak and the 30th anniversary of Phil Lynott's death. Black Star Riders' third album, Heavy Fire, was released on 3 February 2017 and reached No. 6 in the UK album charts.

=== The Fighting Hearts ===
In February 2014, Warwick launched a campaign through PledgeMusic to launch two albums later in the year, one comprising acoustic songs with the other being a hard rock record. The two albums, Hearts on Trees and When Patsy Cline Was Crazy (And Guy Mitchell Sang The Blues), were released at the end of 2014 to those who contributed to the PledgeMusic campaign, and on general release as a double album in February 2016 on the Nuclear Blast label. Guest musicians on these recordings include Damon Johnson, Joe Elliott, Andy Cairns, Billy Morrison, Nathan Connolly, Ginger Wildheart, Richard Fortus and Jake Burns. Warwick assembled a band named The Fighting Hearts to tour behind the album, featuring Gary Sullivan on drums, Black Star Riders bassist Robbie Crane, and ex-Mission guitarist Mark Gemini Thwaite. Ricky Warwick and The Fighting Hearts supported Stiff Little Fingers on a full UK tour throughout late February and March 2016.

The Fighting Hearts undertook a second UK tour in November 2016, supported by Vice Squad. Filling the bass guitar role on this tour was Richard Vernon.

Ricky headlined the very first WinterStorm festival in Troon in 2016.

In 2022, Warwick reactivated The Fighting Hearts for a month-long tour of the UK and Ireland in March. Retaining bass guitarist Richard Vernon, Warwick also recruited guitarist Ben Christo (The Sisters of Mercy) and drummer Jack Taylor (Tax the Heat). Further shows followed in May, with Christo replaced temporarily by Sam Wood (Wayward Sons), and in August, two shows in Dublin and Belfast, again supporting Stiff Little Fingers.

== Personal life ==
Warwick met Vanessa Young, presenter of MTV show Headbangers Ball, in 1989, during his time with The Almighty. They married in 1991 and divorced in 1995.

Warwick is friends with singer Joe Elliott, having performed backing vocals on Def Leppard albums, whilst Elliott has returned the favour recording on and producing Warwick's solo albums. Warwick was Elliott's Best man at his wedding in 2004.

Warwick is a fan of Northern Ireland football club Glentoran, and in 2010 he released a three track DVD in aid of the Spirit of 41 campaign to save Glentoran from extinction. In December 2014, he performed an acoustic benefit show in Dundonald (a town east of Belfast) to raise funds for the Glentoran Community Trust. Warwick wore a specially commissioned one-off Glentoran football strip for the show. It featured the logos of all his bands, including The Almighty and Thin Lizzy, and was auctioned to help raise further funds for the Trust.

== Discography ==
=== Solo albums ===
- Tattoos & Alibis (2003)
- Love Many Trust Few (2005)
- "Love Owes" EP (2007)
- Belfast Confetti (2009)
- Hearts on Trees (2014)
- When Patsy Cline Was Crazy (And Guy Mitchell Sang the Blues) (2014)
- Stairwell Troubadour (2015)
- When Patsy Cline Was Crazy (And Guy Mitchell Sang the Blues) / Hearts on Trees (double album 2016)
- When Life Was Hard and Fast (2021) UK No. 66
- Blood Ties (2025) UK No. 25
- Fire & Vengeance (2026) UK No. 28

=== The Almighty ===
- Blood, Fire & Love (1989)
- Blood, Fire & Live (1990) UK No. 62
- Soul Destruction (1991) UK No. 22
- Powertrippin' (1993) UK No. 5
- Crank (1994) UK No. 15
- Crank and Deceit: Live in Japan [Japan only release] (1995)
- Just Add Life (1996) UK No. 34
- The Almighty (2000)
- Psycho-Narco (2001)
- Wild and Wonderful – compilation (2002)
- Anth'f**ing'ology – compilation (2007)
- All Proud, All Live, All Mighty – live (2008)
- The All Fuckin B-Sides Vol 1 – compilation (2008)

=== Stiff Little Fingers ===
- Pure Fingers – live (1995)

=== (sic) ===
- I Feel So Lonely I Could Die [Japan only release] (1997)
- Eyeball Kicks EP [1997]

=== Circus Diablo ===
- Circus Diablo (2007)

=== Black Star Riders ===
- All Hell Breaks Loose (2013) UK No. 25
- The Killer Instinct (2015) UK No. 13
- Heavy Fire (2017) UK No. 6
- Another State of Grace (2019) UK No. 14
- Wrong Side of Paradise (2023) UK No. 6
