= Bakers Pink =

- Bakers Pink

Background information
- Origin: New York, United States
- Genres: Rock, hard rock, alternative rock
- Years active: 1992–1995
- Label: Epic Records
- Spinoffs: Michael Moon
- Spinoff of: The Front
- Members: Michael Anthony Franano; Mike Greene; Randy Jordan; Shane

Bakers Pink was an American alternative rock band from New York, formed in the early 1990s

Originally known as the Front, from Kansas City, Missouri, the band changed its name when it joined Epic Records. Officially the band name change occurred because the band had changed their sound significantly and wanted to distance itself from its former incarnation, however, according to the front man, Michael Anthony Franano, it was at the behest of the record company.

Bakers Pink was a title of a demo Franano had recorded while cutting basic tracks at Electric Lady Studios. The name stuck and when pressed to come up with a new name, after many suggestions, the band decided on this new moniker. Bakers Pink released one self-titled album in 1993, with Franano writing the majority of the songs. He co-wrote the song "Untouched" which appears on Bakers Pink, with David Werner, who penned "Cradle of Love" a hit for Billy Idol. The album was produced by Mark Dodson, with co-production by Doug Gordon, Franano and Mark Eddinger; the first single, "Watercolours", was re-mixed by Ron Saint Germain. One video, "Watercolours", was released to promote the record. The band toured the U.S. opening for Great White in support of the record.

== Band members ==
- Michael Anthony Franano – Lead Vocals, Guitar
- Mike Greene – Lead/Rhythm Guitars
- Randy Jordan – Bass Guitar/Backing Vocals
- Shane Miller - Drums

=== Additional personnel ===
- Doug Gordan – Guitars/Slide Guitar
- Tom Toons, Tova, Wrecia Ford – Backing Vocals
- Mark Eddinger – Keyboards (additional)
- Bobby Franano – Keyboards
- Gary Corbett - Fender Rhodes (electric piano)
- Matt Chamberlain - Drums
- Brad Hauser - Upright Bass
- Producers: Mark Dodson, Doug Gordon, Michael Anthony Franano, Mark Eddinger,
- Engineers: Mark Dodson, Shannon Carr, Danny Wojnar, Guido Toledo

== Discography ==
Bakers Pink (1993 Epic Records)

=== Albums ===
- Bakers Pink (1993, Epic Records)

Label: Epic – 472227 2
Format: CD, Album
Country: US
Released: February 2, 1993
Genre: Alternative Rock
Recorded at Electric Lady Studios and Hit Factory Studios
In Europe: CBS 466143 1 (LP) and 466143 2 (CD)

=== Singles ===
- "Watercolours" (1993, Epic Records)
