= Belfast Confetti (poem) =

Poem by Ciarán Carson

Belfast Confetti is a poem about the aftermath of a sectarian riot in Belfast by Northern Irish poet and translator Ciarán Carson. The name of the poem derives from the nickname for the large shipbuilding rivets and other scrap metal that were used as missiles by Protestant shipyard workers during anti-Catholic riots in Belfast.

The poem won the Irish Times' Irish Literature Prize for Poetry.
