= Plan 4 =

Argentine metal band

- Origin: Buenos Aires, Argentina
- Genres: Groove metal, metalcore
- Years active: 2003–present
- Members: Javier "Knario" Compiano; Gonzalo Espejo; Pehuén Berdún; Juan Ignacio De Abreu
- Website: plancuatro.com.ar

Plan 4 (sometimes also Plan Cuatro) is an Argentine heavy metal band from Buenos Aires that formed in 2003.

== History ==
After the dissolution of Raiz, three of its members, singer Javier Compiano, drummer Gonzalo Espejo and guitarist Leandro Zunni joined Diego Oviedo (former Hentai) to form Plan 4. The band released their first EP, La Música Es Tu Mejor Arma. The EP contains a live versions "Destino" and "Libre" as well as the videoclip for "Destino"

Plan 4 took part on the first ever Latin American tribute to Black Sabbath, titled "Sabbath Crosses" contributing the song "TV Crimes". They have also recorded "Somebody Put Something in My Drink" for a double CD tribute to The Ramones

In August 2005, Plan 4 released their first album, titled "Cambio De Piel" (Change of Skin), produced by Heaven Records and Dias De Garage. The CD has 14 tracks and was recorded, mixed and mastered at Estudios Abismo. The band promoted the album throughout Argentina with their "Cambio De Piel Tour 2005" and during 2006 as well.

== Discography ==
=== EP ===
Released in 2004

1. Destino (Destiny)
2. Libre (Free)
3. El Principio O El Fin (The Beginning Or The End)
4. Destino (live) (Destiny)
5. El Principio O El Fin (live) (The Beginning Or The End)
6. Videoclip for Destino

=== Cambio De Piel ===
Released in 2005

1. Latidos (Heartbeats)
2. Entre La Vida Y La Muerte (Between Life And Death)
3. Alma, Cuerpo Y Mente (Soul, Body And Mind)
4. Destino (Destiny)
5. Nuevo Amanecer (New Dawn)
6. Reaccion En Cadena (Chain Reaction)
7. Donde Estes (Wherever You Are)
8. El Principio O El Fin (The Beginning Or The End)
9. Cambio Mi Piel (I Change My Skin)
10. La Fuerza (The Force)
11. Libre (Free)
12. Semillas (Seeds)
13. Pppp (Pppp)
14. Basta, Se Acabo! (Enough, It's Over!)

=== Dos Caras ===
Edited in 2007

1. Radiochaos
2. El Mundo Gira (Igual)
3. Ella
4. La Jaula
5. Señor de la Guerra
6. En el Olvido
7. Refugio
8. Dos Caras
9. Ardientes Corazones
10. Más Allá de la Razón
11. Condena
12. El Sobreviviente
13. La Ira de Dios
14. Mi Religion

=== EXTRACHAOS Vol. 1 ===
Edited in 2008

1. T.V Crimes (Black Sabbath)
2. Somebody put something in my drink (Ramones)
3. Skin o my teeth (Megadeath)
4. Armas (Massacre)
5. Supera el dolor
6. Dos caras **
7. Más alla de la razón **
8. El principio o el fin **
9. Entre la vida y la muerte **
10. Destino **

** In Live

=== Tributes and compilations ===
- Sabbath Crosses - Tribute to Black Sabbath, released in 2004

- TV Crimes

- Todos Somos Ramones (We Are All Ramones) - Homage to The Ramones, released in 2004

- Somebody Put Something in My Drink

- Hangar De Almas (Hangar of Souls) - Tribute to Megadeth, released in 2005

- Skin o' My Teeth
