= Powertrippin' =

Studio album by The Almighty
- Released: 5 April 1993
- Recorded: 1993 at Ridge Farm Studios, Capel, Surrey, England; Demoed 1992 at Sawmills Studios, Golant, Cornwall, England
- Genre: Hard rock, grunge, heavy metal
- Length: 58:27
- Label: Polydor
- Producer: Mark Dodson

The Almighty chronology
Soul Destruction (1991)	Powertrippin' (1993)	Crank (1994)

Professional ratings
Review scores
Source	Rating
AllMusic	2/5 stars
Music Week	4/5 stars

Powertrippin' is the third studio album by Scottish rock band The Almighty. It was released in the United Kingdom in 1993 by Polydor Records and was the band's final studio album for that label. It was the band's first album to feature guitarist Pete Friesen, who replaced founding guitarist Tantrum. Friesen contributed to the songwriting and was a major part of the new sound presented on this album, introducing a heavier, riff-based grunge sound compared to the punk leanings of earlier efforts. The subject of the cover art is taken from the artwork Jet Age Man by Ralph Morse, which featured on the cover of Life magazine in December 1954.

Three singles were released from the album in multiple formats in 1993. "Addiction" (CD, 12" vinyl), "Out of Season" (2-CD, 7" vinyl & 12" vinyl) and "Over the Edge" (CD, cassette, 12" & 7" vinyl). The album was re-released in the United Kingdom and later in Japan with a bonus disc which contained a live show from August 22, 1992 at Donington Park. An EP that was released in Japan only includes four live track from the band's 1993 European tour supporting Iron Maiden. The EP, called "Liveblood", also has two studio tracks, "Fuckin' Up" a Neil Young cover and "In a Rut" a cover of the Ruts song. These studio tracks were put out on the "Out of Season" singles.

== Track listing ==
All lyrics by Ricky Warwick except as indicated. All music by Warwick and Pete Friesen except tracks 3 & 4 (Warwick), 8 (Warwick, Floyd London & Stump Munroe) and 10 (Friesen, London)

1. "Addiction" – 5:40
2. "Possession" – 4:27
3. "Over the Edge" (Warwick, Del James) – 4:36
4. "Jesus Loves You... But I Don't" – 6:01
5. "Sick and Wired" – 4:48
6. "Powertrippin'" – 2:50
7. "Takin' Hold" – 5:15
8. "Out of Season" – 5:35
9. "Lifeblood" – 5:27
10. "Instinct" (Warwick, James) – 5:16
11. "Meathook" – 4:40
12. "Eye to Eye" (Warwick, Friesen) – 4:01

=== Bonus disc: Live from Donington '92 ===
1. "Crucify" – 4:57
2. "Full Force Lovin' Machine" – 3:41
3. "Love Religion" – 5:06
4. "Addiction" – 6:21
5. "Sin Against the Light" – 5:00
6. "Free N' Easy" – 5:12
7. "Wild and Wonderful" – 7:35

== B-Sides ==
1. "Soul Destruction (1989 Demo)" – 5:49
2. "Blind" (Warwick, Friesen) – 6:40
3. "In a Rut"
  - The Ruts cover
4. "Insomnia"
5. "Wild & Wonderful (Demo)"
6. "Free 'n' Easy (Demo)"
7. "Fuckin' Up" – 4:33
  - Neil Young cover
8. "Keep On Rockin' in the Free World" – 4:40
  - Neil Young cover

== Personnel ==
As listed in liner notes.

The Almighty

- Ricky Warwick – lead vocals, rhythm, acoustic guitar and 12-string guitar
- Pete Friesen – guitars
- Floyd London – bass, vocals
- Stump Monroe – drums, percussion, sand pipe

Additional musicians

- Blaze Bayley – additional backing vocals on "Jesus Loves You..."
- Mark Dodson – additional guitar on "Taking Hold"
- James Taylor – piano on "Jesus Loves You...", Hammond organ on "Instinct", "Sick and Wired" and "Out of Season".
- Additional backing vocals by The Crazy Gang

Production

- Steve Bray – assistant engineer
- Mark Dodson – producer, engineering and mixing
- Ian Huffam – engineering and mixing
- Dave Taylor – assistant engineer
- Phil Woods – assistant engineer

Mastered by Greg Calbi at Sterling Sound, New York
