= The Almighty (band) =

Scottish rock band

- The Almighty circa 1992. L-R: Pete Friesen, Floyd London, Stump Munroe, Ricky Warwick

Background information
- Origin: Glasgow, Scotland
- Genres: Hard rock; heavy metal
- Years active: 1988–1996; 1999–2002; 2006–2009; 2023–present
- Labels: Polydor; Chrysalis; Castle; Sanctuary; Pony Canyon
- Members: Ricky Warwick; Tantrum; Floyd London; Stump Monroe
- Past members: Pete Friesen; Nick Parsons; Gav Gray

The Almighty are a Scottish hard rock/heavy metal band from Glasgow formed in 1988. After disbanding for the first time in 1996, they were reunited from 1999 to 2002, again from 2006 to 2009 and reformed for the third time in 2023. Three of the founding members, Ricky Warwick, Stump Monroe and Floyd London were friends who met at school. Although the band members musical roots were in punk, the Almighty adopted a more heavy metal/hard rock oriented musical direction in their early years. Later albums saw the band's musical style move towards the band members' original punk roots. They have released seven studio albums, two anthologies and three live albums.

== History ==
=== 1988–1993 ===
The Almighty were formed in Strathaven on 19 January 1988. Most of the musicians came from a punk background. Lead singer Ricky Warwick had previously done some session and tour work with New Model Army, although not on any of their recordings. Ricky, drummer Stump Monroe and bass guitarist Floyd London were friends at school and had previously played together in a local band called Rough Charm. The three were joined by guitarist Andy "Tantrum" McCafferty to complete the band line-up. Despite the band members largely punk rock roots, the Almighty followed a more heavy metal/hard rock oriented musical direction, and recorded an eight-track demo to help promote their early gigs.

They were signed by Polydor in March 1989 and recorded their first album, Blood, Fire & Love which was released in October to generally positive reviews. The band were also signed to a long-term songwriting agreement to Chrysalis Music, having been scouted by Dave Massey. In the same year they were voted in third place on the Kerrang! readers poll for Best New Act.

In 1990 they toured the UK and also embarked upon a short US tour in an attempt to break into the American market. However, a more extensive follow up tour of the US did not go ahead, although they did embark on a European club tour. The band's hard rock sound was compared favourably with the likes of the Cult, AC/DC and Motörhead in press reviews of their live shows. A live album, Blood, Fire & Live, was released on 8 October 1990, having been recorded at July gigs in Edinburgh and Nottingham. The track list featured songs from Blood, Fire & Love, plus a cover of Bachman–Turner Overdrive's "You Ain't Seen Nothing Yet".

Recording of the Almighty's second studio album, Soul Destruction, began in December 1990 with Duran Duran guitarist Andy Taylor as producer. The album was released in March 1991 along with the lead single "Free'n'Easy". In February and March the band toured the UK supporting Motörhead and Megadeth. In June 1991 they embarked on a headline UK tour. The concert at the Town and Country club in London was filmed and released later that year on VHS as Soul Destruction – Live. Later in the year they supported Alice Cooper on a European tour.

In March 1992 internal differences within the band came to a head causing guitarist Tantrum to leave the band. He was replaced by Canadian Pete Friesen who had previously played for Alice Cooper, and had met the Almighty when they played support for him the previous year. In the spring the band were invited to tour Australia in support of the Screaming Jets, who had just released the Living in England EP and wanted a British band for the support on their tour. That summer the band were the opening act at the Donington Monsters of Rock festival, and during their set played a new song entitled "Addiction". Towards the end of the year they began preparing material for a third album.

In April 1993 Powertrippin', their third album, was released, charting at Number 5. The album displayed grunge influences, with Alice in Chains being a regular comparison in reviews. The Almighty embarked upon a European tour supporting Iron Maiden, their longest tour to date. This was followed with a support slot at that year's Milton Keynes Bowl festival, which substituted for Donington as the Monsters of Rock festival was not staged in 1993. In Autumn 1993 they finally toured America, but failed to make the hoped-for impact. On their return they started a headline European tour, but had to abandon it after the first two London dates due to poor health. In November, the Almighty parted from manager Tommy Tee and moved to Sanctuary Records. At the same time they left Polydor and signed with Chrysalis. They were able to perform some replacement UK shows the same month, but were not able to tour Europe as planned.

=== 1994–1996 ===
Their fourth album, Crank, was released on Chrysalis in late 1994. The album saw the Almighty's musical style shift towards the band members original punk roots. They appeared on Top of the Pops in support of the first single, "Wrench", which reached Number 26 in the UK singles chart. The second single from the album, "Jonestown Mind", also reached Number 26. In the autumn they toured the UK in support of the album and spent seven weeks in Europe supporting Pantera. The band returned to tour Europe as headliners in early 1995. In May they recorded four tracks for a proposed EP. However, the band decided that the tracks were good enough to form the basis for a fifth album. They therefore decided to arrange two more recording sessions during 1995, recording four tracks each time, so that they would have enough for an album release in 1996.

Their fifth album, Just Add Life, was released in 1996, with the lead single "All Sussed Out" reaching Number 28 in the UK singles chart. However, various record company issues and frustrations with the music industry in general saw the band disband later that year.

=== 1999–2002 ===
The band reformed in 1999 and released the self-titled album The Almighty in the following year, replacing guitarist Pete Friesen with Nick Parsons. A second album followed in 2001, Psycho-Narco, with a new bass player Gav Gray who replaced longtime bassist Floyd London. The band disbanded again with vocalist Ricky Warwick pursuing a solo career.

In 2002 a compilation album, Wild and Wonderful was released, which included material from their three Polydor albums, along with covers of "Bodies", by the Sex Pistols, "You Ain't Seen Nuthin Yet" from Blood Fire & Live and "Keep on Rocking in the Free World" by Neil Young.

=== 2006–2022 ===
The classic lineup (Ricky, Stump, Floyd and Pete) reformed for benefit shows in January 2006 and then appeared at the 2006 Bulldog Bash. They undertook a short five show tour at the end of December 2006. In 2007, the band released their second compilation album, Anth F***in'Ology – the Gospel According to The Almighty, covering their entire career and including a DVD of all their promo videos to date.

A lengthier UK tour took place in January 2008 to mark the band's twentieth anniversary. It was announced on 17 January that the band would be recording footage with multiple cameras at various shows on the upcoming tour for a 20th Anniversary DVD. Ricky Warwick announced in an interview with Komodo Rock that there were plans to record a new album following the band's UK Tour. He said "I would like to. ... I'm inspired again though, and I feel to me it might be time to turn round and make that definitive Almighty Album."

In November 2008, Floyd announced on the band's forum and MySpace pages that he had decided to leave the band. The Almighty had been on hiatus since then, aside from a one-off benefit gig in June 2009 for the family of former manager Tommy Tee who had died in December 2008. It was announced in December 2014 that the band's first two studio albums, Blood, Fire & Love and Soul Destruction were to be re-released in early 2015 with additional tracks and live recordings. Ricky Warwick commented about any possible future reunion, saying "I certainly would be open to the idea of doing a few shows. I don't know how the others feel about it. I love the guys and I love the songs. I would like to play them one day again because life is short and you just get one shot at it".

In late 2020, Warwick announced the impending release of a box-set comprising the band's back catalogue from 1994 onwards, as well as demos and other material. He also stated that he was still in regular contact with Stumpy Munroe and Tantrum, but had not spoken with Pete Friesen or Floyd London for six years – making any potential band reunion highly unlikely, particularly given Warwick's ongoing role as frontman of the Black Star Riders and his own solo career. The box-set was released in March 2021; seven discs comprising the four albums released between 1994–2001, as well as B-sides, remixes, live recordings and demo tracks.

=== 2023–present ===
On 1 January 2023, Warwick teased a potential reunion of The Almighty with the words "Never say never" displayed in front of the band's logo. At a press conference at The Karma Sanctum Soho Hotel in London on 27 February 2023, Monroe, London, McCafferty and Warwick confirmed they would reunite for three winter shows along with the news that a new boxset featuring their first four albums, would be released at the end of 2023. Warwick said: "It's nice to reconnect, and to have something in common and to be able to get out and play together again. It's brilliant." When asked if The Almighty had a new album in the works, Warwick said, "I'll go with 'never say never'. Sorry if it's cheesy, but we've all got so much going on in our lives at the moment that I really can't look past the first show."

The Almighty continued their reunion with a trio of UK shows, titled "Three 'N' Easy", in 2024 and 2025 in celebration of Saint Andrew's Day, as well as live dates with Wolfsbane. In addition, the band headlined one date at the Steelhouse Festival in July 2024, played their first shows in Japan in more than three decades in January 2025, and played at Knebworth Park on 11 July 2026 by opening for Iron Maiden as part of the latter's Run for Your Lives World Tour. They have also discussed the possibility of writing new material.

In 2025, The Almighty recorded a cover of Metallica's "The Four Horsemen" as part of the tribute album No Life 'Til Leather - A Tribute to Metallica's Kill 'Em All; the track was released as the album's first single and the band also recorded a video. In the album's liner notes, Ricky Warwick stated that this was the first time the band's original lineup had been in the studio together since 1991.

== Members ==
Current lineup

- Ricky Warwick – vocals, guitar (1988–2002, 2006–2009, 2023–present)
- Stump Munroe – drums, backing vocals (1988–2002, 2006–2009, 2023–present)
- Floyd London – bass, backing vocals (1988–2000, 2006–2008, 2009, 2023–present)
- Tantrum – guitar, backing vocals (1988–1991, 2023–present)

Former members

- Pete Friesen – guitar (1991–1996, 2006–2009)
- Nick Parsons – guitar (1999–2002)
- Gav Gray – bass (2001–2002)

Timeline

== Discography ==
=== Studio albums ===
- Blood, Fire & Love (1989)
- Soul Destruction (1991) UK No. 22
- Powertrippin' (1993) UK No. 5
- Crank (1994) UK No. 15
- Just Add Life (1996) UK No. 34
- The Almighty (2000) UK No. 154
- Psycho-Narco (2001)

=== Live albums ===
- Blood, Fire & Live (1990) UK No. 62
- Crank and Deceit: Live in Japan [Japan only release] (1995)
- All Proud, All Live, All Mighty (2008)

=== Compilation albums ===
- Wild and Wonderful (2002)
- Anth'f**ing'ology (2007) UK No. 165
- The All Fuckin B-Sides Vol 1 (2008)

=== VHS/DVDs ===
- Soul Destruction Live (VHS) – (1991)
- Official Bootleg – Live at Glasgow Garage (DVD) – (2007)
- All Proud, All Live, All Mighty (DVD) – (2008)

=== Singles ===
- 1989 "Destroyed"
- 1989 "Power" UK No. 82
- 1990 "Wild and Wonderful" UK No. 50
- 1991 "Free 'n' Easy" UK No. 35
- 1991 "Devils Toy" UK No. 36
- 1991 "Little Lost Sometimes" UK No. 42
- 1993 "Addiction" UK No. 38
- 1993 "Over the Edge" UK No. 38
- 1993 "Out of Season" UK No. 41
- 1994 "Wrench" UK No. 26
- 1995 "Jonestown Mind" UK No. 26
- 1996 "All Sussed Out" UK No. 28
- 1996 "Do You Understand" UK No. 38

=== Soundtrack contributions ===
- Saw V Original Motion Picture Soundtrack – (2008)
- The track "Bandaged Knees" was used in the end credits of Shameless [Mad dogs and Englishmen] (1995)
