= Celebrity (1998 film) =

1998 film by Woody Allen

- Theatrical release poster
- Directed by: Woody Allen
- Written by: Woody Allen
- Produced by: Letty Aronson; Richard Brick; J.E. Beaucaire; Jean Doumanian; Charles H. Joffe; Jack Rollins
- Starring: Hank Azaria; Kenneth Branagh; Judy Davis; Leonardo DiCaprio; Melanie Griffith; Famke Janssen; Michael Lerner; Joe Mantegna; Bebe Neuwirth; Winona Ryder; Charlize Theron
- Cinematography: Sven Nykvist
- Edited by: Susan E. Morse
- Production companies: Sweetland Films; Magnolia Productions
- Distributed by: Miramax Films
- Release date: November 20, 1998
- Running time: 113 minutes
- Country: United States
- Language: English
- Budget: $12 million
- Box office: $5.1 million

Celebrity is a 1998 American comedy-drama film written and directed by Woody Allen, starring Kenneth Branagh, and featuring Judy Davis and an ensemble cast. The screenplay describes the divergent paths taken by a couple following their divorce.

The film received lukewarm reviews from critics and was a commercial disappointment.

== Plot ==
In New York City, Lee Simon is an unsuccessful novelist turned fame-seeking celebrity journalist. Interviewing movie star Nicole Oliver on the set of her latest film, Lee flirts with Nola, a young background extra. Nicole takes the amorous Lee to visit her childhood home, where she offers him oral sex, and he pitches her on a screenplay he has written. At a fashion show, Lee's 1967 Aston Martin catches the eye of an orgasmically sensitive supermodel. She invites him home after a night on the town, but storms off after he distractedly drives into a store window.

Lee's ex-wife Robin, a former English teacher, is still reeling from their divorce after sixteen years of marriage and attends a Catholic retreat. At a plastic surgery consultation, she meets television producer Tony Gardella and reluctantly accompanies him to a film premiere. Robin causes a scene after running into Lee, who tells his date Bonnie how a midlife crisis at his high school reunion inspired him to pursue his new life. Bonnie, a well-connected editor, encourages Lee to finish his next novel, but he collapses from embarrassment at a literary party.

Robin begins a romance with Tony, who hires her to schedule guests for a tabloid talk show, and she meets his boisterous extended family. Lee spends a wild day with volatile young movie star Brandon Darrow, who is nearly arrested after a hotel room fracas. Interested in his screenplay, Brandon invites Lee to join him in group sex, but is too distracted to perform sex with Brandon and his partner in the same bed. Robin visits a sex worker for oral sex tips, and is forced to save her from choking on a banana.

Completing his novel, Lee crosses paths with Nola, who invites him to meet her that night. He lies to Bonnie and slips away to see Nola, comparing her to the love interests about whom he has written, and they have sex at her apartment. In the morning, as Bonnie is moving in with Lee, he admits he has met someone else, and she leaves with the only copy of his novel. Chasing her to the pier, he is forced to watch as she boards a ferry and tosses his manuscript in the water.

Robin has traded her neuroses for a makeover and her own celebrity interview program, and prepares to marry Tony. She runs away from the ceremony, but after an impromptu session with a psychic, she decides to go through with the wedding and embrace a happier life. Meanwhile, Lee's insecurities hurt his relationship with Nola. At the premiere of Nicole Oliver's movie, the successful, happily married, and newly pregnant Robin runs into the struggling Lee, who continues to question his own happiness.

== Cast ==
- Hank Azaria as David
- Kenneth Branagh as Lee Simon
- Judy Davis as Robin Simon
- Leonardo DiCaprio as Brandon Darrow
- Melanie Griffith as Nicole Oliver
- Famke Janssen as Bonnie
- Michael Lerner as Dr. Lupus
- Joe Mantegna as Tony Gardella
- Bebe Neuwirth as Nina
- Winona Ryder as Nola
- Charlize Theron as Supermodel
- Dylan Baker as Catholic Retreat Priest
- Kate Burton as Cheryl
- Patti D'Arbanville as Iris
- Karen Duffy as TV Reporter
- Ned Eisenberg as Elaine's Book Party Guest
- André Gregory as John Papadakis
- Allison Janney as Evelyn Isaacs
- Debra Messing as TV Reporter
- Isaac Mizrahi as Bruce Bishop
- Gretchen Mol as Vicky
- Greg Mottola as Director
- Larry Pine as Philip Datloff
- Sam Rockwell as Darrow Entourage member
- Aida Turturro as Olga
- Celia Weston as Dee Bartholemew
- Jeffrey Wright as Greg
- Douglas McGrath as Bill Gaines
- J. K. Simmons as Souvenir Hawker
- Anthony Mason as Himself
- Gerry Becker as Jay Tepper
- Ileen Getz as Reunion Announcer, Glenwood High Alumni
- David Margulies as Counselor Adelman
- Tony Sirico as Lou DeMarco
- Adrian Grenier as Darrow Entourage member
- John Doumanian as Darrow Entourage member
- Lorri Bagley as Gina, Chekhov-style Writer
- Tony Darrow as Moving Man in Loft
- Celia Weston as Dee Bartholomew
- Donald Trump as Himself
- Michael Moon as Himself (Vocals/Guitar), El Flamingo Band

== Production ==
The film was shot in black-and-white on location in New York City by cinematographer Sven Nykvist. Celebrity was the last of four films shot by Nykvist for Allen. It also marks the end of Allen's long collaboration with editor Susan E. Morse, who had edited the previous twenty Allen films, beginning with Manhattan (1979).

== Release ==
The film premiered at the Venice Film Festival and was shown at the New York Film Festival before going into general release in the US on November 20, 1998. It opened on 493 screens, grossing $1,588,013 and ranked #10 in its opening weekend. It eventually earned $5,078,660 in the US.

== Critical reception ==
On Rotten Tomatoes, the film has 43% rating, based on reviews from 42 critics. The site's consensus calls it "entertaining, but too scattered". On Metacritic, it has a score of 42%, based on reviews from 25 critics, indicating "mixed or average" reviews. Audiences polled by CinemaScore gave the film an average grade of "C+" on an A+ to F scale.

Janet Maslin of The New York Times observed, "Lee Simon is one of the filmmaker's wearier creations, in ways that deny Celebrity the bracing audacity of recent, better Allen films like Deconstructing Harry and Everyone Says I Love You. And even with Branagh as his younger alter ego, Allen finds no way to revitalize the character's predictable worries about advancing his career and chasing beautiful women ... Though Celebrity is filled with beautiful and famous faces, it has plenty of opportunity to bog down between star turns, and some of the episodes about the Simons are astonishingly flat."

Roger Ebert of the Chicago Sun-Times said the film "plays oddly like the loose ends and unused inspirations of other Woody Allen movies; it's sort of a revue format in which a lot of famous people appear onscreen, perform in the sketch Woody devises for them and disappear. Some of the moments are very funny. More are only smile material, and a few don't work at all. Like all of Allen's films, it's smart and quirky enough that we're not bored, but we're not much delighted, either ... Branagh has all the Allen vocal mannerisms and the body language of comic uncertainty. He does Allen so carefully, indeed, that you wonder why Allen didn't just play the character himself."

Peter Travers of Rolling Stone felt the film "suffers from lulls and lapses and one lulu of a casting gaffe, but this keenly observant spoof of the fame game is hardly the work of a burnout. At sixty-two, the Woodman can still mine caustic laughter from the darkest corners of his psyche. In Celebrity, he cracks his ringmaster's whip on a circus of rude, cathartic fun ... Branagh, whether by his choice or his director's, plays Lee like a Woody impressionist, down to the nervous gestures and the stuttering whine ... Lee should emerge as flawed but real in a world of gorgeous poseurs. Instead, Branagh's party-trick performance keeps audiences at a distance. What saves the day is the steady march of scintillating cameos from actors who bring out the best in Allen's barbed dialogue."

Edward Guthmann of the San Francisco Chronicle stated, "Branagh stammers, bobs his head and runs the gamut of other established Woody tics and mannerisms – delivering nervous shtick where a performance would have sufficed. His novelty act belongs in the same bin with his hammy histrionics in Mary Shelley's Frankenstein ... The irony of Celebrity is that so much of it is admirably acted, written and directed. Despite his one-note obsessions, Allen is a fine director whose stories clip along, whose dialogue sparkles and whose actors look grateful for the luxury of his words."

Todd McCarthy of Variety called the film "a once-over-lightly rehash of mostly stale Allen themes and motifs", and added, "The spectacle of Kenneth Branagh and Judy Davis doing over-the-top Woody Allen impersonations creates a neurotic energy meltdown ... Branagh is simply embarrassing as he flails, stammers and gesticulates in a manner that suggests a direct imitation of Allen himself ... For her part, Davis was brilliant in Husbands and Wives and has appeared effectively in other Allen films, but she not only overdoes the neurotic posturing this time but is essentially miscast ... Annoyingly mannered in performance as well as tiresomely familiar in the way it trots out its angst-ridden urban characters' problems, [the picture] has a hastily conceived, patchwork feel that is occasionally leavened by some lively supporting turns and the presence of so many attractive people onscreen."

Neil Norman of the London Evening Standard noted that "many scenes, and indeed personalities, lack the credence of similar shots in Annie Hall, Manhattan or even Stardust Memories. Judy Davis's doorstepping television interviews in the Jean-Georges restaurant where she encounters several well-heeled New Yorkers, including Donald Trump (who is planning to buy St Patrick's Cathedral and knock it down) are frankly risible; a rehearsal scene in the Ziegfeld Theatre where [Winona Ryder] is being coached in the art of seducing a woman (gasp!) smacks of old-fashioned prurience. Fashion designer Isaac Mizrahi's turn as a lionised New York artist complaining at his opening at the Serge Sorokko Gallery in SoHo that fame will ruin him, is simply banal. Even the opening shot, of a film crew on the streets attempting to catch a reaction shot of Melanie Griffith' walking from a limo, is peopled with a veteran film-maker's notion of what young hip film-makers are like (shavenheaded, natch) rather than an identifiable reality."

The film drew comparisons to Federico Fellini's film La Dolce Vita. Lisa Schwarzbaum of Entertainment Weekly graded the film "B−" and called it a "big, muddled, contemporary variation on La Dolce Vita". She added, "[I]n every minute of DiCaprio's participation ... he juices Celebrity with a power surge that subsides as soon as he exits."

== Soundtrack ==
- "You Oughta Be in Pictures" (1934) – Music by Dana Suesse – Lyrics by Edward Heyman – Performed by Jack Little
- "Symphony No.5 in C Minor, Op.67" (1809) – Written by Ludwig van Beethoven – Performed by The Royal Philharmonic Orchestra
- "Tangerine" (1942) – Music by Victor Schertzinger – Lyrics by Johnny Mercer – Performed by the Dave Brubeck Quartet
- "Kumbayah" – Performed by Janet Marlow
- "Chanel No. 5" (1998) – Written by Michael Anthony Franano from the Michael Moon
- "Did I Remember (To Tell You I Adore You)" (1936) – Music by Walter Donaldson – Lyrics by Harold Adamson – Performed by Billie Holiday
- "Fascination" (1932) – Music by Fermo Dante Marchetti – Lyrics by Maurice de Féraudy – Performed by Liberace
- "Truckin'" (1970) – Music by Bob Weir, Jerry Garcia and Phil Lesh – Lyrics by Robert Hunter
- "The Impossible Dream (The Quest)" (1965) – Music by Mitch Leigh – Lyrics by Joe Darion
- "American Pie" (1972) – Written by Don McLean – Performed by The High School Reunion Band
- "All Hail to You, Glenwood High" – Written by Eddy Davis – Performed by the High School Reunion Band
- "I Got Rhythm" (1930) – Music by George Gershwin – Lyrics by Ira Gershwin – Performed by Teddy Wilson
- "That Old Feeling" (1937) – Music by Sammy Fain – Lyrics by Lew Brown – Performed by Stan Getz and Gerry Mulligan
- "Will You Still Be Mine" (1941) – Music by Matt Dennis- Lyrics by Tom Adair – Performed by Erroll Garner
- "Lullaby of Birdland" (1952) – Music by George Shearing – Lyrics by George David Weiss – Performed by Erroll Garner
- "On a Slow Boat to China" (1948) – Written by Frank Loesser – Performed by Jackie Gleason
- "Cocktails for Two" (1934) – Music by Arthur Johnston – Lyrics by Sam Coslow – Performed by Carmen Cavallaro
- "Soon" (1930) – Music by George Gershwin – Lyrics by Ira Gershwin – Performed by Ray Cohen
- "Bridal Chorus" (1850) – Written by Richard Wagner – Performed by Ray Cohen
- "For All We Know" (1934) – Music by J. Fred Coots – Lyrics by Sam Lewis – Performed by Ray Cohen
