= Pete Friesen =

Canadian guitarist

- Also known as: Pete Freezin'
- Born: November 19, 1965 (age 60); Saskatoon, Saskatchewan, Canada
- Genres: Rock; hard rock; heavy metal
- Occupation: Guitarist
- Years active: 1989 - present
- Formerly of: The Almighty
- Website: https://www.petefriesenguitar.com/

Pete Friesen (born Peter Menno Friesen; November 19, 1965) is a Canadian guitarist who has toured with such acts as Alice Cooper, The Almighty and Iron Maiden vocalist Bruce Dickinson.

== Biography ==
Pete Friesen was born in Saskatoon, Saskatchewan. While still playing under the name "Pete Freezin'", he was a member of VO5 with a pre-Skid Row Sebastian Bach. He was a member of Alice Cooper's band from 1989–1991, 1998–2000 and 2002. He played on both the Trash and Hey Stoopid tours, and also appears in the film Wayne's World alongside Cooper, where he memorably asked the question "In fact, isn't Milwaukee an Indian name?"

Friesen left Cooper's band in 1992 and moved to the UK to join Scottish rock band The Almighty. He recorded and toured with the band from 1992 until 1996. The band recorded the top 5 album Powertrippin for Polydor, and Crank and Just Add Life for Chrysalis/EMI records. They opened up Donington festival in 1992 and the following year supported Metallica at Milton Keynes Bowl. They did several headline tours through the UK, as well as tours in Europe, Japan, Australia, U.S.A., and South America. They disbanded in 1996, but the lineup featuring Friesen reformed in January 2006 to play two shows to raise money for leukemia research. These were followed by a couple of short UK tours in 2007 and 2008. A live DVD of the London show from the 2008 and tour has been released.

In 2002, Friesen also did a short stint playing guitar for Iron Maiden's vocalist Bruce Dickinson's solo band; they did a string of summer festival dates throughout Europe. Pete has recorded library music for London based company Brilliant Music. From 2014 to 2016 Pete played guitar in the Ray Davies/Kinks musical "Sunny Afternoon", which ran at the Harold Pinter Theatre in London's West End.
