= Lists of UK Chart number ones =

This is a list of lists of UK Chart number ones.

== Albums Chart ==
- List of UK Albums Chart number ones of the 1950s
- List of UK Albums Chart number ones of the 1960s
- List of UK Albums Chart number ones of the 1970s
- List of UK Albums Chart number ones of the 1980s
- List of UK Albums Chart number ones of the 1990s
- List of UK Albums Chart number ones of the 2000s
- List of UK Albums Chart number ones of the 2010s
- List of UK Albums Chart number ones of the 2020s
- List of UK Albums Chart Christmas number ones

== Album Downloads Chart ==
- List of UK Album Downloads Chart number ones of the 2000s
- List of UK Album Downloads Chart number ones of the 2010s
- List of UK Album Downloads Chart number ones of the 2020s

== Compilation Chart ==
- List of UK Compilation Chart number-one albums of the 1980s
- List of UK Compilation Chart number-one albums of the 1990s
- List of UK Compilation Chart number-one albums of the 2000s
- List of UK Compilation Chart number-one albums of the 2010s
- List of UK Compilation Chart number-one albums of the 2020s
- List of Classical Compilation Albums Chart number ones

== Country Albums Chart ==
- 2000s: 2006
- 2007
- 2008
- 2009
- 2010s: 2010
- 2011
- 2012
- 2013
- 2014
- 2015
- 2016
- 2017
- 2018
- 2019
- 2020s: 2020
- 2021
- 2022
- 2023
- 2024
- 2025
- 2026

== Dance Albums Chart ==
- 2000s: 2005
- 2006
- 2007
- 2008
- 2009
- 2010s: 2010
- 2011
- 2012
- 2013
- 2014
- 2015
- 2016
- 2017
- 2018
- 2019
- 2020s: 2020
- 2021
- 2022
- 2023
- 2024
- 2025
- 2026

== Dance Singles Chart ==
- Before 2000: 1987
- 1988
- 1994
- 1995
- 1996
- 1997
- 1998
- 1999
- 2000s: 2000
- 2001
- 2002
- 2003
- 2004
- 2005
- 2006
- 2007
- 2008
- 2009
- 2010s: 2010
- 2011
- 2012
- 2013
- 2014
- 2015
- 2016
- 2017
- 2018
- 2019
- 2020s: 2020
- 2021
- 2022
- 2023
- 2024
- 2025
- 2026

== Independent Albums Chart ==
- 2000s: 2005
- 2006
- 2007
- 2008
- 2009
- 2010s: 2010
- 2011
- 2012
- 2013
- 2014
- 2015
- 2016
- 2017
- 2018
- 2019
- 2020s: 2020
- 2021
- 2022
- 2023
- 2024
- 2025
- 2026

== Independent Singles and Albums Breakers Chart ==
- List of UK Independent Album Breakers Chart number ones of the 2000s
- List of UK Independent Album Breakers Chart number ones of the 2010s
- List of UK Independent Album Breakers Chart number ones of the 2020s
- List of UK Independent Singles Breakers Chart number ones of the 2000s
- List of UK Independent Singles Breakers Chart number ones of the 2010s
- List of UK Independent Singles Breakers Chart number ones of the 2020s

== Independent Singles Chart ==
- List of UK Independent Singles Chart number ones of the 1980s
- 1990s: 1990
- 1991
- 1992
- 1993
- 1994
- 1995
- 1996
- 1997
- 1998
- 1999
- 2000s: 2000
- 2001
- 2002
- 2003
- 2004
- 2005
- 2006
- 2007
- 2008
- 2009
- 2010s: 2010
- 2011
- 2012
- 2013
- 2014
- 2015
- 2016
- 2017
- 2018
- 2019
- 2020s: 2020
- 2021
- 2022
- 2023
- 2024
- 2025
- 2026

== Jazz & Blues Albums Chart ==
- 1990s: 1994
- 1995
- 1996
- 1997
- 1998
- 1999
- 1996
- 1997
- 1998
- 1999
- 2000s: 2000
- 2001
- 2002
- 2003
- 2004
- 2005
- 2006
- 2007
- 2008
- 2009
- 2010s: 2010
- 2011
- 2012
- 2013
- 2014
- 2015
- 2016
- 2017
- 2018
- 2019
- 2020s: 2020
- 2021
- 2022
- 2023
- 2024
- 2025

== R&B Albums Chart ==
- 1990s: 1994
- 1995
- 1996
- 1997
- 1998
- 1999
- 2000s: 2000
- 2001
- 2002
- 2003
- 2004
- 2005
- 2006
- 2007
- 2008
- 2009
- 2010s: 2010
- 2011
- 2012
- 2013
- 2014
- 2015
- 2016
- 2017
- 2018
- 2019
- 2020s: 2020
- 2021
- 2022
- 2023
- 2024
- 2025
- 2026

== R&B Singles Chart ==
- 1990s: 1994
- 1995
- 1996
- 1997
- 1998
- 1999
- 2000s: 2000
- 2001
- 2002
- 2003
- 2004
- 2005
- 2006
- 2007
- 2008
- 2009
- 2010s: 2010
- 2011
- 2012
- 2013
- 2014
- 2015
- 2016
- 2017
- 2018
- 2019
- 2020s: 2020
- 2021
- 2022
- 2023
- 2024
- 2025
- 2026

== Rock & Metal Singles and Albums Charts ==
=== Singles ===
- 1980s: 1986
- 1987
- 1988
- 1990s: 1990
- 1993
- 1994
- 1995
- 1996
- 1997
- 1998
- 1999
- 2000s: 2000
- 2001
- 2002
- 2003
- 2004
- 2005
- 2006
- 2007
- 2008
- 2009
- 2010s: 2010
- 2011
- 2012
- 2013
- 2014
- 2015
- 2016
- 2017
- 2018
- 2019
- 2020s: 2020
- 2021
- 2022
- 2023
- 2024
- 2025
- 2026

=== Albums ===
- 1990s: 1993
- 1994
- 1995
- 1996
- 1997
- 1998
- 1999
- 2000s: 2000
- 2001
- 2002
- 2003
- 2004
- 2005
- 2006
- 2007
- 2008
- 2009
- 2010s: 2010
- 2011
- 2012
- 2013
- 2014
- 2015
- 2016
- 2017
- 2018
- 2019
- 2020s: 2020
- 2021
- 2022
- 2023
- 2024
- 2025
- 2026

== Singles Chart ==
- List of UK singles chart number ones of the 1950s
- List of UK singles chart number ones of the 1960s
- List of UK singles chart number ones of the 1970s
- List of UK singles chart number ones of the 1980s
- List of UK singles chart number ones of the 1990s
- List of UK singles chart number ones of the 2000s
- List of UK singles chart number ones of the 2010s
- List of UK singles chart number ones of the 2020s
- List of UK singles chart Christmas number ones

== Singles Downloads Chart ==
- List of UK Singles Downloads Chart number ones of the 2000s
- List of UK Singles Downloads Chart number ones of the 2010s
- List of UK Singles Downloads Chart number ones of the 2020s

== Subscription Plays Chart ==
- List of Official Subscription Plays Chart number-one songs of the 2000s
- List of Official Subscription Plays Chart number-one songs of the 2010s
