= List of UK R&B Singles Chart number ones of 1994 =

The UK R&B Chart is a weekly chart that ranks the 40 biggest-selling singles and albums that are classified in the R&B genre in the United Kingdom. The chart is compiled by the Official Charts Company, and is based on physical and other physical formats. This is a list of the UK's biggest R&B hits of 1994.

== Number ones ==
Key
†	Best-selling R&B single of the year

Issue date	Single	Artist
9 October	"Sweetness"	Michelle Gayle
16 October	"She's Got That Vibe"	R. Kelly
23 October	"She's Got That Vibe"	R. Kelly
30 October	"Oh Baby I..."	Eternal
6 November	"Let Me Be Your Fantasy"	Baby D
13 November	"Sight for Sore Eyes"	M People
20 November	"Half the Man"	Jamiroquai
27 November	"All I Want For Christmas Is You"	Mariah Carey
4 December	"All I Want For Christmas Is You"	Mariah Carey
11 December	"All I Want For Christmas Is You"	Mariah Carey
18 December	"All I Want For Christmas Is You"	Mariah Carey
25 December	"All I Want For Christmas Is You"	Mariah Carey

== See also ==
- List of UK Dance Singles Chart number ones of 1994
- List of UK Independent Singles Chart number ones of 1994
- List of UK Rock & Metal Singles Chart number ones of 1994
- List of UK R&B Albums Chart number ones of 1994
