= List of UK Country Albums Chart number ones of 2008 =

These are the Official Charts Company's UK Country Albums Chart number ones of 2008. The chart week runs from Friday to Thursday with the chart-date given as the following Thursday. Chart positions are based the multi-metric consumption of country music in the United Kingdom, blending traditional album sales, track equivalent albums, and streaming equivalent albums. The chart contains 20 positions.

In the iteration of the chart dated 6 January, Long Road Out of Eden by the Eagles spent its tenth consecutive week at number one, and held the top spot for the first twenty three weeks of 2008 before being placed by Dolly Parton's six-week spell at number one with Backwoods Barbie. Long Road Out of Eden would return to the chart peak for two multi-week stints, spending a total of thirty one weeks atop the chart. Meet Glen Campbell held number one for five non-consecutive weeks. Country Boy by Daniel O'Donnell debuted on 2 November and stayed at the top spot for the remaining nine weeks of 2008.

== Chart history ==
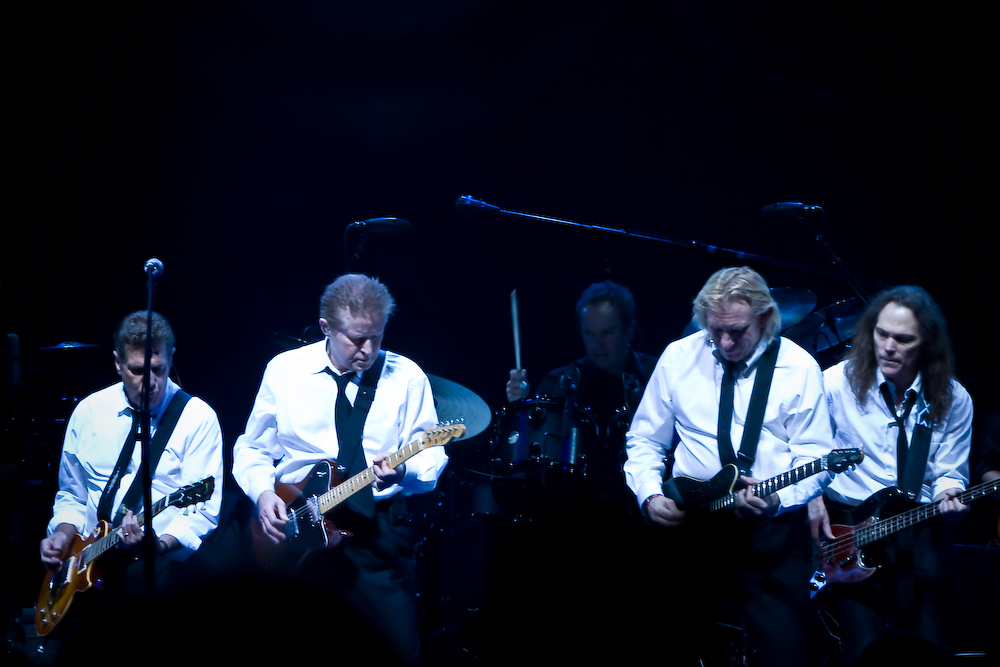
The Eagles' final studio release Long Road Out of Eden spent 31 weeks at number one.

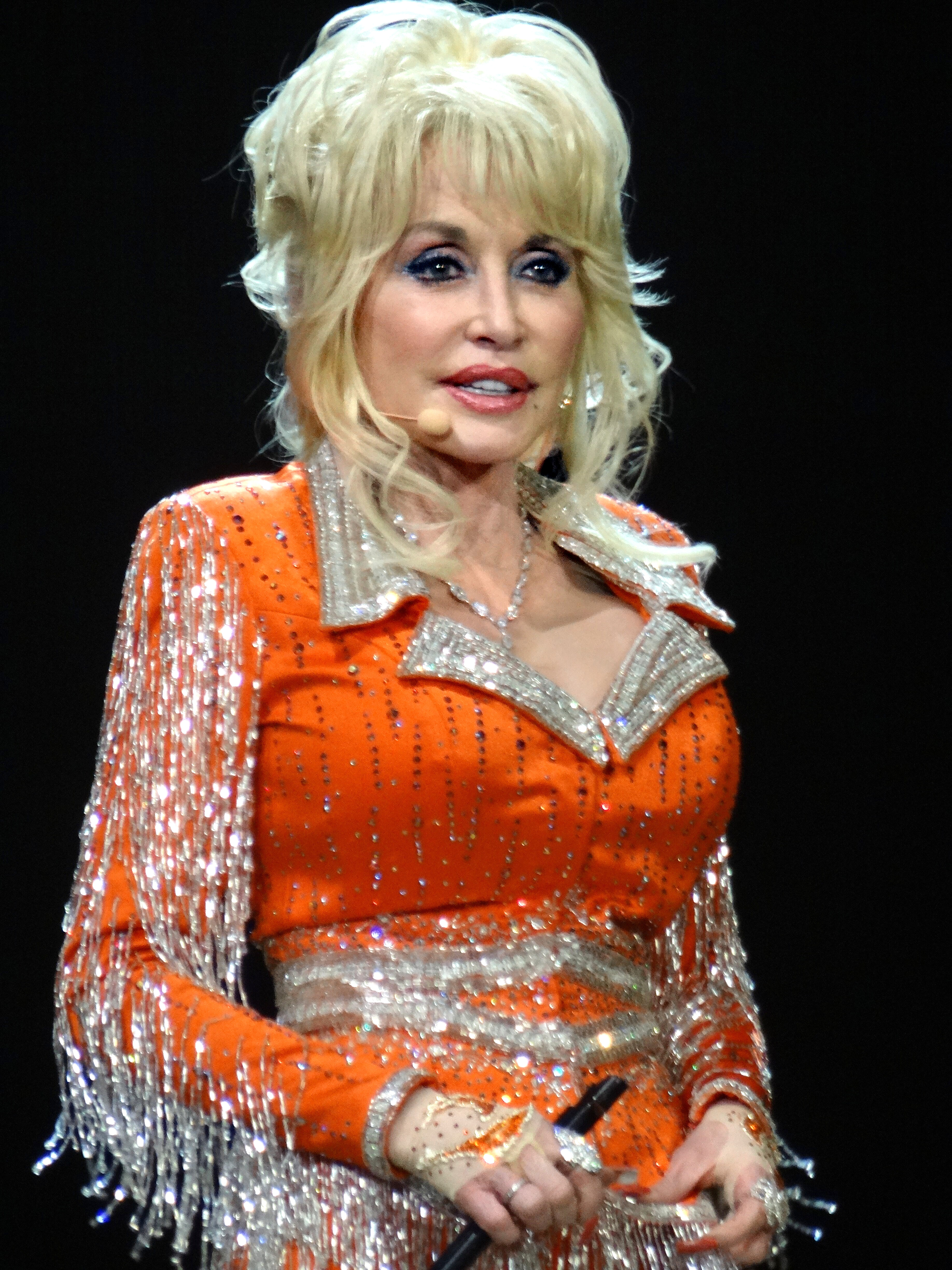
Dolly Parton's Backwoods Barbie held the top spot for 6 weeks.

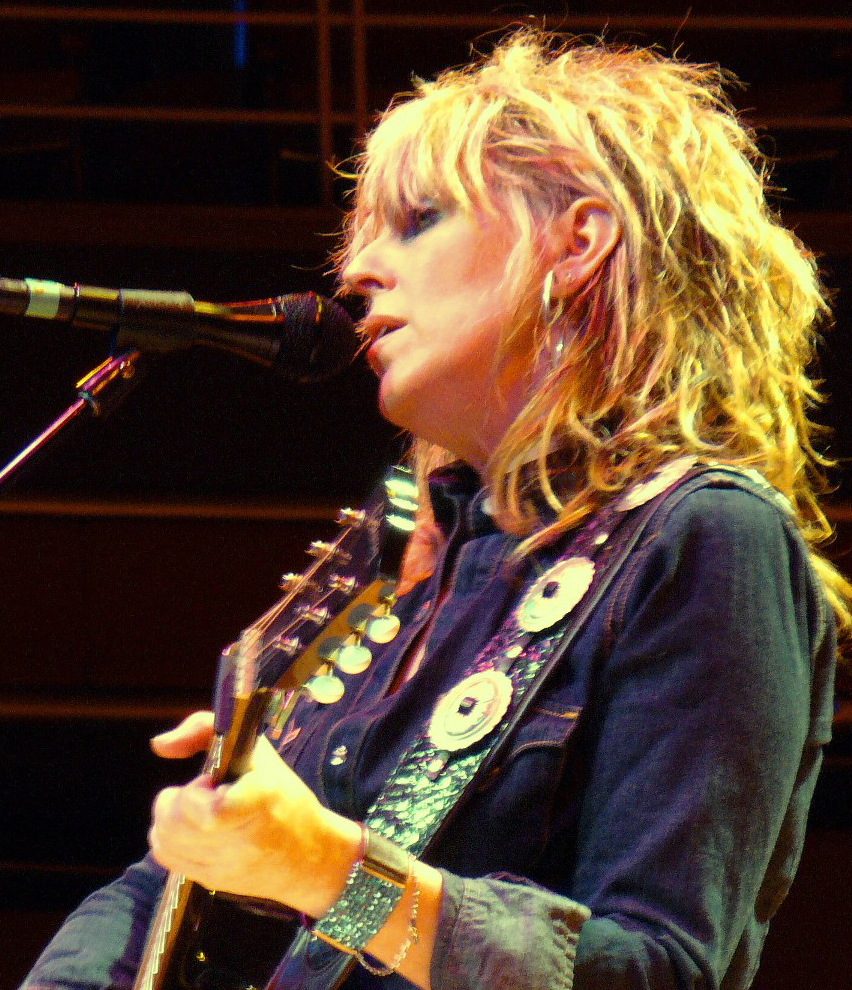
Lucinda Williams achieved her first UK number one album with Little Honey.

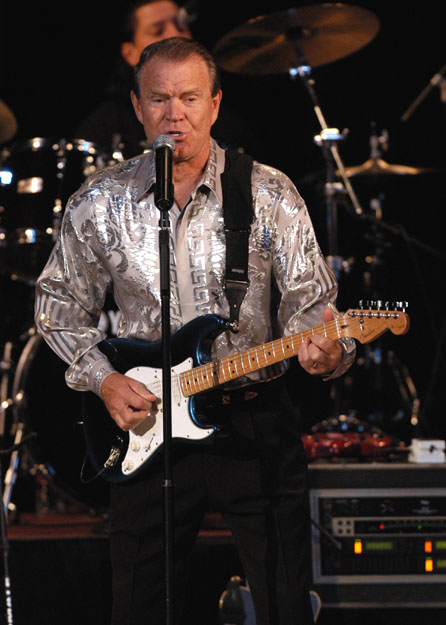
Meet Glen Campbell was number one for 5 weeks.

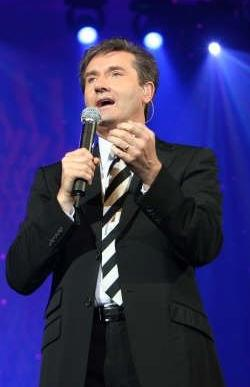
Country Boy by Daniel O'Donnell was number one for 9 consecutive weeks.

Issue date	Album	Artist(s)	Record label	Ref.
6 January	Long Road Out of Eden	Eagles	Polydor	
13 January	Long Road Out of Eden	Eagles	Polydor	
20 January	Long Road Out of Eden	Eagles	Polydor	
27 January	Long Road Out of Eden	Eagles	Polydor	
3 February	Long Road Out of Eden	Eagles	Polydor	
10 February	Long Road Out of Eden	Eagles	Polydor	
17 February	Long Road Out of Eden	Eagles	Polydor	
24 February	Long Road Out of Eden	Eagles	Polydor	
2 March	Long Road Out of Eden	Eagles	Polydor	
9 March	Long Road Out of Eden	Eagles	Polydor	
16 March	Long Road Out of Eden	Eagles	Polydor	
23 March	Long Road Out of Eden	Eagles	Polydor	
30 March	Long Road Out of Eden	Eagles	Polydor	
6 April	Long Road Out of Eden	Eagles	Polydor	
13 April	Long Road Out of Eden	Eagles	Polydor	
20 April	Long Road Out of Eden	Eagles	Polydor	
27 April	Long Road Out of Eden	Eagles	Polydor	
4 May	Long Road Out of Eden	Eagles	Polydor	
11 May	Long Road Out of Eden	Eagles	Polydor	
18 May	Long Road Out of Eden	Eagles	Polydor	
25 May	Long Road Out of Eden	Eagles	Polydor	
1 June	Long Road Out of Eden	Eagles	Polydor	
8 June	Long Road Out of Eden	Eagles	Polydor	
15 June	Backwoods Barbie	Dolly Parton	Universal	
22 June	Backwoods Barbie	Dolly Parton	Universal	
29 June	Backwoods Barbie	Dolly Parton	Universal	
6 July	Backwoods Barbie	Dolly Parton	Universal	
13 July	Backwoods Barbie	Dolly Parton	Universal	
20 July	Backwoods Barbie	Dolly Parton	Universal	
27 July	Long Road Out of Eden	Eagles	Polydor	
3 August	Long Road Out of Eden	Eagles	Polydor	
10 August	Long Road Out of Eden	Eagles	Polydor	
17 August	Long Road Out of Eden	Eagles	Polydor	
24 August	Long Road Out of Eden	Eagles	Polydor	
31 August	Meet Glen Campbell	Glen Campbell	Capitol	
7 September	Meet Glen Campbell	Glen Campbell	Capitol	
14 September	Meet Glen Campbell	Glen Campbell	Capitol	
21 September	Long Road Out of Eden	Eagles	Polydor	
28 September	Long Road Out of Eden	Eagles	Polydor	
5 October	Long Road Out of Eden	Eagles	Polydor	
12 October	Meet Glen Campbell	Glen Campbell	Capitol	
19 October	Little Honey	Lucinda Williams	Lost Highway	
26 October	Meet Glen Campbell	Glen Campbell	Capitol	
2 November	Country Boy	Daniel O'Donnell	DMG TV	
9 November	Country Boy	Daniel O'Donnell	DMG TV	
16 November	Country Boy	Daniel O'Donnell	DMG TV	
23 November	Country Boy	Daniel O'Donnell	DMG TV	
30 November	Country Boy	Daniel O'Donnell	DMG TV	
7 December	Country Boy	Daniel O'Donnell	DMG TV	
14 December	Country Boy	Daniel O'Donnell	DMG TV	
21 December	Country Boy	Daniel O'Donnell	DMG TV	
28 December	Country Boy	Daniel O'Donnell	DMG TV	

== Most weeks at number one ==
Weeks at number one	Artist
31	Eagles
9	Daniel O'Donnell
6	Dolly Parton
5	Glen Campbell

== See also ==
- List of UK Albums Chart number ones of 2008
- List of UK Dance Singles Chart number ones of 2008
- List of UK Album Downloads Chart number ones of 2008
- List of UK Independent Albums Chart number ones of 2008
- List of UK R&B Albums Chart number ones of 2008
- List of UK Rock & Metal Albums Chart number ones of 2008
- List of UK Compilation Chart number ones of the 2000s
