= List of UK Jazz & Blues Albums Chart number ones of 2013 =

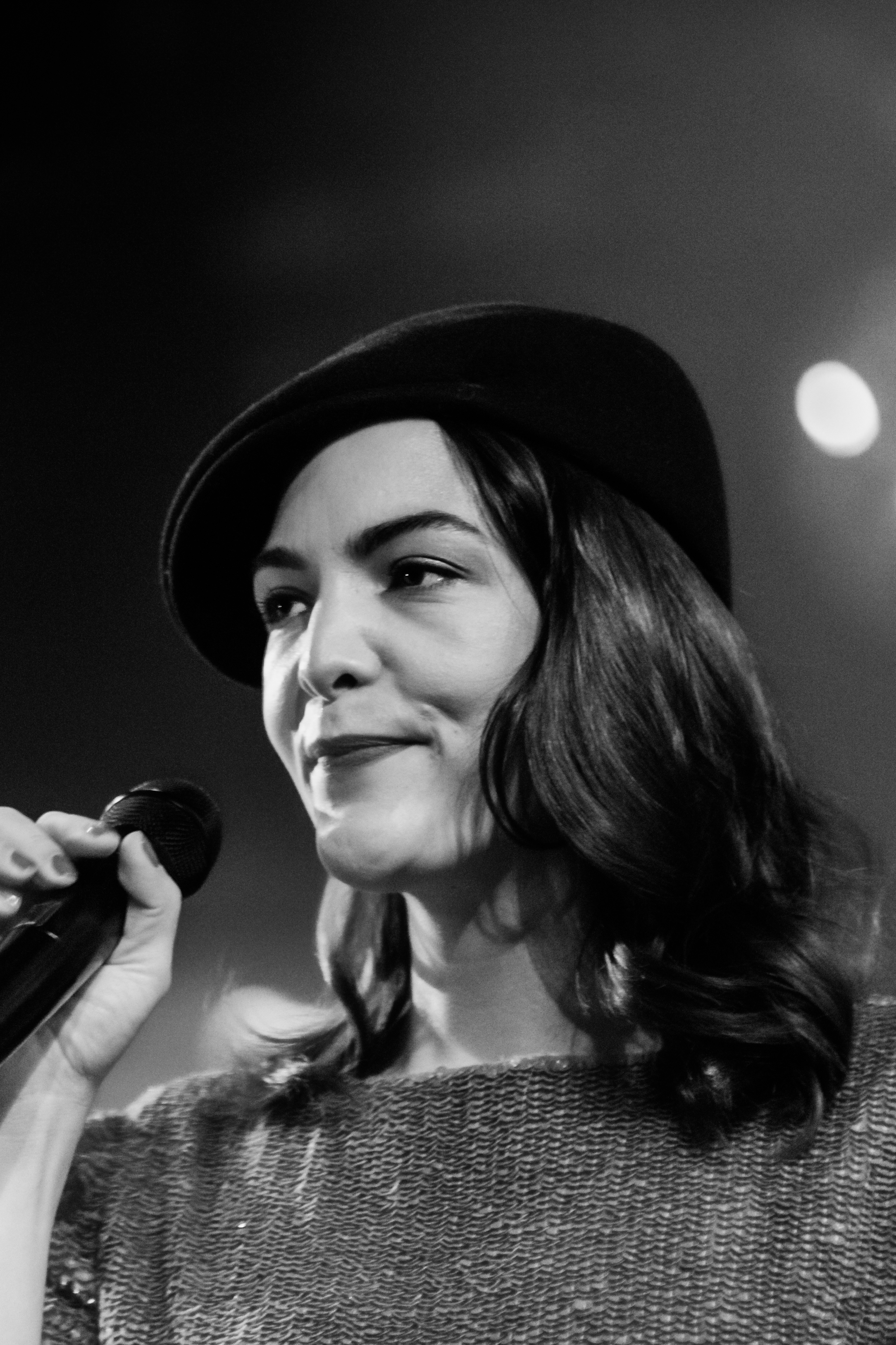
Caro Emerald's second album The Shocking Miss Emerald spent a total of 32 weeks at number one on the UK Jazz & Blues Albums Chart in 2013, including a run of 18 consecutive weeks.

The UK Jazz & Blues Albums Chart is a record chart which ranks the best-selling jazz and blues albums in the United Kingdom. Compiled and published by the Official Charts Company, the data is based on each album's weekly physical sales, digital downloads and streams. In 2013, 52 charts were published with seven albums at number one. The first number-one album of the year was The Golden Age of Song by Jools Holland, which spent the first 12 weeks of the year at the top of the chart. The last number-one album of the year was Caro Emerald's second album The Shocking Miss Emerald, which spent eight consecutive weeks from November until the end of the year at number one.

The most successful album on the UK Jazz & Blues Albums Chart in 2013 was The Shocking Miss Emerald, which spent a total of 32 weeks at number one over three separate spells of 18, six and eight weeks. Emerald also spent three weeks atop the chart with her debut album, Deleted Scenes from the Cutting Room Floor. Seasick Steve spent two weeks atop the chart in 2013, one each for Hubcap Music and Walkin' Man: The Best of Seasick Steve. The Golden Age of Song was the second most successful album on the chart during 2013, topping the chart for a total of 13 weeks. The Shocking Miss Emerald finished 2013 as the 46th best-selling album of the year in the UK.

== Chart history ==
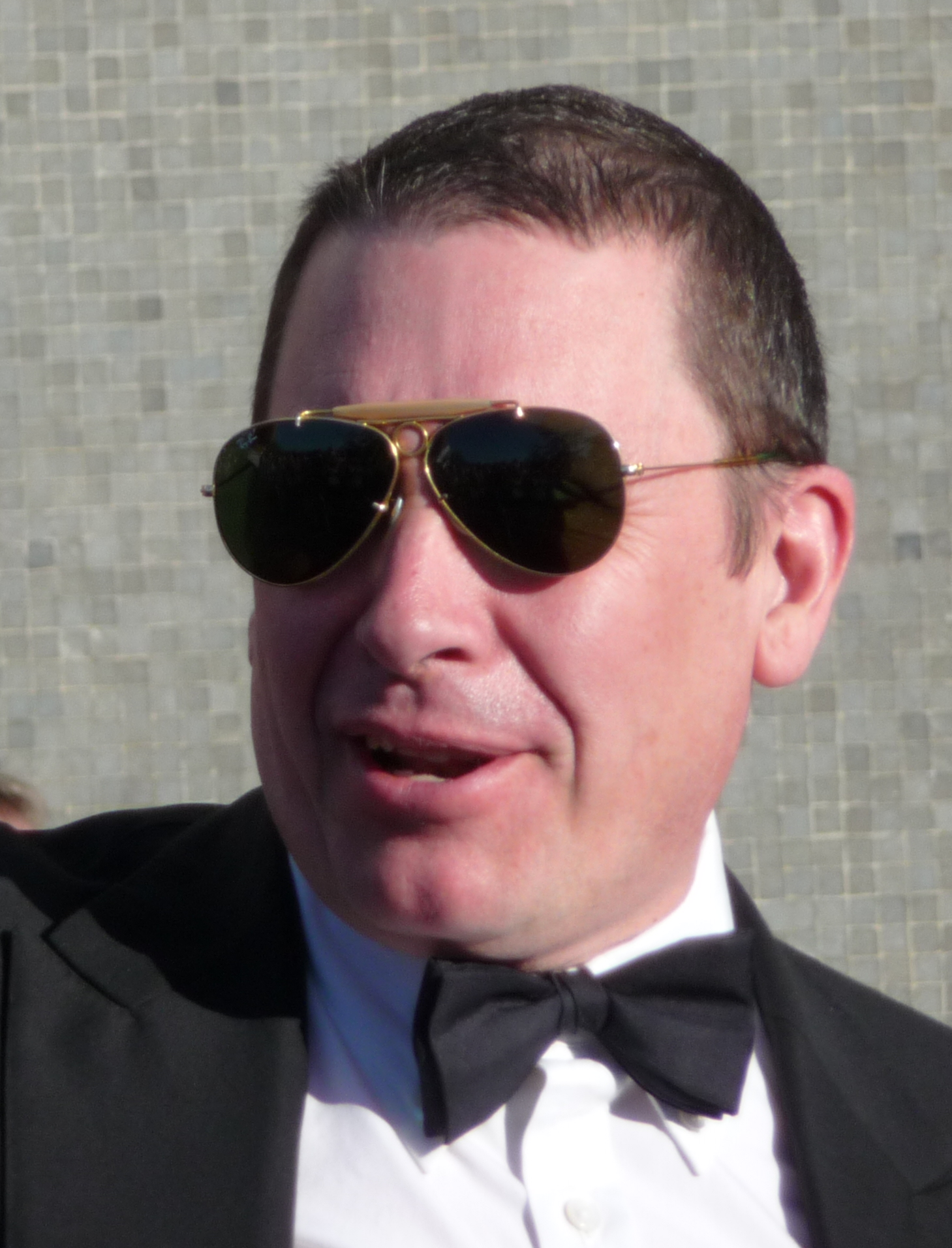
Jools Holland spent 13 weeks at number one during 2013, including the first 12 weeks of the year, with the album The Golden Age of Song.

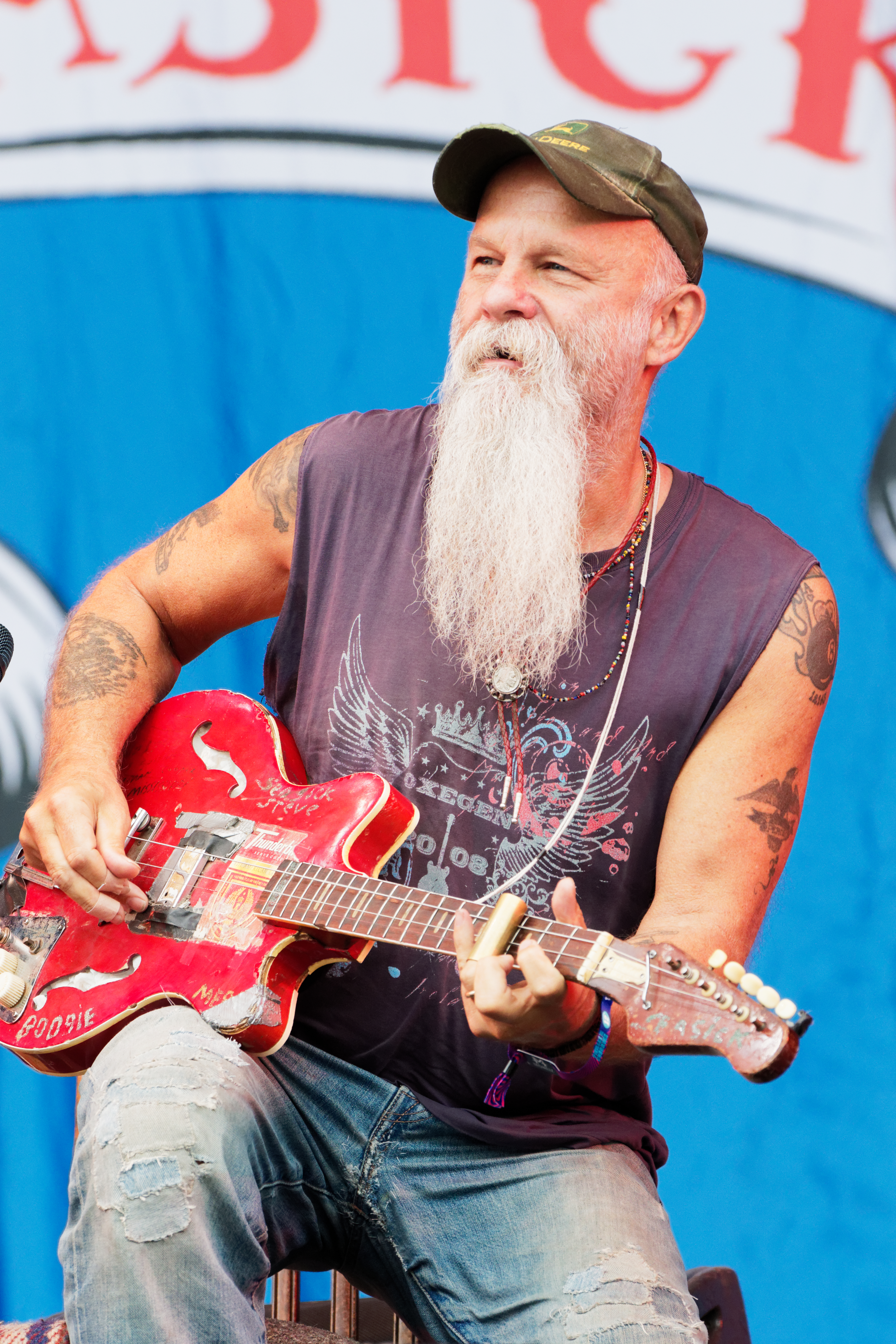
Seasick Steve spent two weeks atop the UK Jazz & Blues Albums Chart in 2013 with two separate releases: Hubcap Music and Walkin' Man: The Best Of.

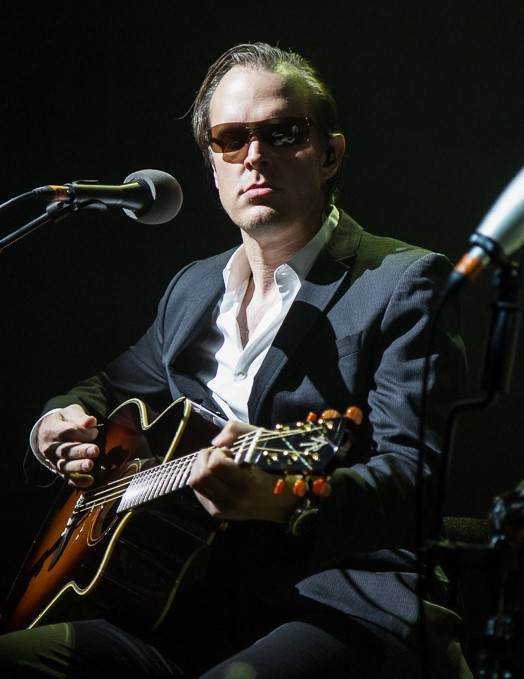
Joe Bonamassa spent one week at number one in 2013 with An Acoustic Evening at the Vienna Opera House.

Key
†	Indicates best-selling jazz/blues album of 2013

Issue date	Album	Artist(s)	Record label(s)	Ref.
6 January	The Golden Age of Song	Jools Holland	Rhino	
13 January	The Golden Age of Song	Jools Holland	Rhino	
20 January	The Golden Age of Song	Jools Holland	Rhino	
27 January	The Golden Age of Song	Jools Holland	Rhino	
3 February	The Golden Age of Song	Jools Holland	Rhino	
10 February	The Golden Age of Song	Jools Holland	Rhino	
17 February	The Golden Age of Song	Jools Holland	Rhino	
24 February	The Golden Age of Song	Jools Holland	Rhino	
3 March	The Golden Age of Song	Jools Holland	Rhino	
10 March	The Golden Age of Song	Jools Holland	Rhino	
17 March	The Golden Age of Song	Jools Holland	Rhino	
24 March	The Golden Age of Song	Jools Holland	Rhino	
31 March	An Acoustic Evening at the Vienna Opera House	Joe Bonamassa	Provogue	
7 April	The Golden Age of Song	Jools Holland	Rhino	
14 April	Deleted Scenes from the Cutting Room Floor	Caro Emerald	Dramatico	
21 April	Deleted Scenes from the Cutting Room Floor	Caro Emerald	Dramatico	
28 April	Deleted Scenes from the Cutting Room Floor	Caro Emerald	Dramatico	
5 May	Hubcap Music	Seasick Steve	Fiction	
12 May	The Shocking Miss Emerald †	Caro Emerald	Dramatico/Grandmono	
19 May	The Shocking Miss Emerald †	Caro Emerald	Dramatico/Grandmono	
26 May	The Shocking Miss Emerald †	Caro Emerald	Dramatico/Grandmono	
2 June	The Shocking Miss Emerald †	Caro Emerald	Dramatico/Grandmono	
9 June	The Shocking Miss Emerald †	Caro Emerald	Dramatico/Grandmono	
16 June	The Shocking Miss Emerald †	Caro Emerald	Dramatico/Grandmono	
23 June	The Shocking Miss Emerald †	Caro Emerald	Dramatico/Grandmono	
30 June	The Shocking Miss Emerald †	Caro Emerald	Dramatico/Grandmono	
7 July	The Shocking Miss Emerald †	Caro Emerald	Dramatico/Grandmono	
14 July	The Shocking Miss Emerald †	Caro Emerald	Dramatico/Grandmono	
21 July	The Shocking Miss Emerald †	Caro Emerald	Dramatico/Grandmono	
28 July	The Shocking Miss Emerald †	Caro Emerald	Dramatico/Grandmono	
4 August	The Shocking Miss Emerald †	Caro Emerald	Dramatico/Grandmono	
11 August	The Shocking Miss Emerald †	Caro Emerald	Dramatico/Grandmono	
18 August	The Shocking Miss Emerald †	Caro Emerald	Dramatico/Grandmono	
25 August	The Shocking Miss Emerald †	Caro Emerald	Dramatico/Grandmono	
1 September	The Shocking Miss Emerald †	Caro Emerald	Dramatico/Grandmono	
8 September	The Shocking Miss Emerald †	Caro Emerald	Dramatico/Grandmono	
15 September	Liquid Spirit	Gregory Porter	Blue Note	
22 September	The Shocking Miss Emerald †	Caro Emerald	Dramatico/Grandmono	
29 September	The Shocking Miss Emerald †	Caro Emerald	Dramatico/Grandmono	
6 October	The Shocking Miss Emerald †	Caro Emerald	Dramatico/Grandmono	
13 October	The Shocking Miss Emerald †	Caro Emerald	Dramatico/Grandmono	
20 October	The Shocking Miss Emerald †	Caro Emerald	Dramatico/Grandmono	
27 October	The Shocking Miss Emerald †	Caro Emerald	Dramatico/Grandmono	
3 November	Walkin' Man: The Best of Seasick Steve	Seasick Steve	Rhino	
10 November	The Shocking Miss Emerald †	Caro Emerald	Dramatico/Grandmono	
17 November	The Shocking Miss Emerald †	Caro Emerald	Dramatico/Grandmono	
24 November	The Shocking Miss Emerald †	Caro Emerald	Dramatico/Grandmono	
1 December	The Shocking Miss Emerald †	Caro Emerald	Dramatico/Grandmono	
8 December	The Shocking Miss Emerald †	Caro Emerald	Dramatico/Grandmono	
15 December	The Shocking Miss Emerald †	Caro Emerald	Dramatico/Grandmono	
22 December	The Shocking Miss Emerald †	Caro Emerald	Dramatico/Grandmono	
29 December	The Shocking Miss Emerald †	Caro Emerald	Dramatico/Grandmono	

== See also ==
- 2013 in British music
