= List of UK Compilation Chart number-one albums of the 1980s =

This is the list of the number-one albums of the UK Compilation Chart during the 1980s. A total of 15 different albums reached number one on the chart during the decade. From 14 January 1989, sales of Various Artists albums were excluded from the main UK Album Chart and used instead to compile the new Compilation Albums Chart.

== Number-one albums ==
Key
| † | Best-selling compilation album of the year |

| No. | Artist (Note: The artist, album, date of reaching number one and number of weeks at number one are those given by the Official Charts Company.) | Album | Record label | Reached number one (for the week ending) | Weeks at number one |
1989
| 1 | Various artists | Now That's What I Call Music XIII | EMI/Virgin Records/Polygram | 14 January 1989 | 1 |
| 2 | Various artists | The Premiere Collection: The Best of Andrew Lloyd Webber | Really Useful Group/Polydor | 21 January 1989 | 2 |
| 3 | Various artists | The Marquee – Thirty Legendary Years | Polydor | 4 February 1989 | 4 |
| 4 | Various artists | The Awards | Telstar | 4 March 1989 | 1 |
| re | Various artists | The Premiere Collection: The Best of Andrew Lloyd Webber | Really Useful Group/Polydor | 11 March 1989 | 1 |
| 5 | Various artists | Deep Heat | Telstar | 18 March 1989 | 1 |
| 6 | Various artists | Unforgettable 2 | EMI | 25 March 1989 | 1 |
| 7 | Various artists | Now That's What I Call Music 14 | EMI/Virgin Records/Polygram | 1 April 1989 | 7 |
| 8 | Various artists | Nite Flite 2 | CBS | 20 May 1989 | 2 |
| 9 | Various artists | The Hits Album 10 | CBS/BMG/WEA | 3 June 1989 | 6 |
| 10 | Various artists | Now! Dance '89 | EMI/Virgin | 15 July 1989 | 6 |
| 11 | Various artists | Now That's What I Call Music 15 | EMI/Virgin Records/Polygram | 26 August 1989 | 5 |
| 12 | Various artists | Deep Heat 4 – Play with Fire | Telstar | 30 September 1989 | 5 |
| 13 | Various artists | Smash Hits Party '89 | Dover | 4 November 1989 | 3 |
| 14 | Various artists | The 80s – The Album of the Decade | EMI | 25 November 1989 | 1 |
| 15 | Various artists | Now That's What I Call Music 16 | EMI/Virgin Records/Polygram | 2 December 1989 | 7 |
