= List of UK Jazz & Blues Albums Chart number ones of 2000 =

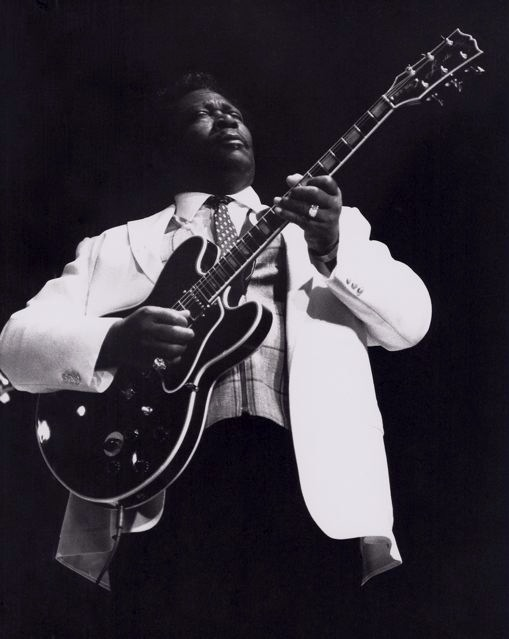
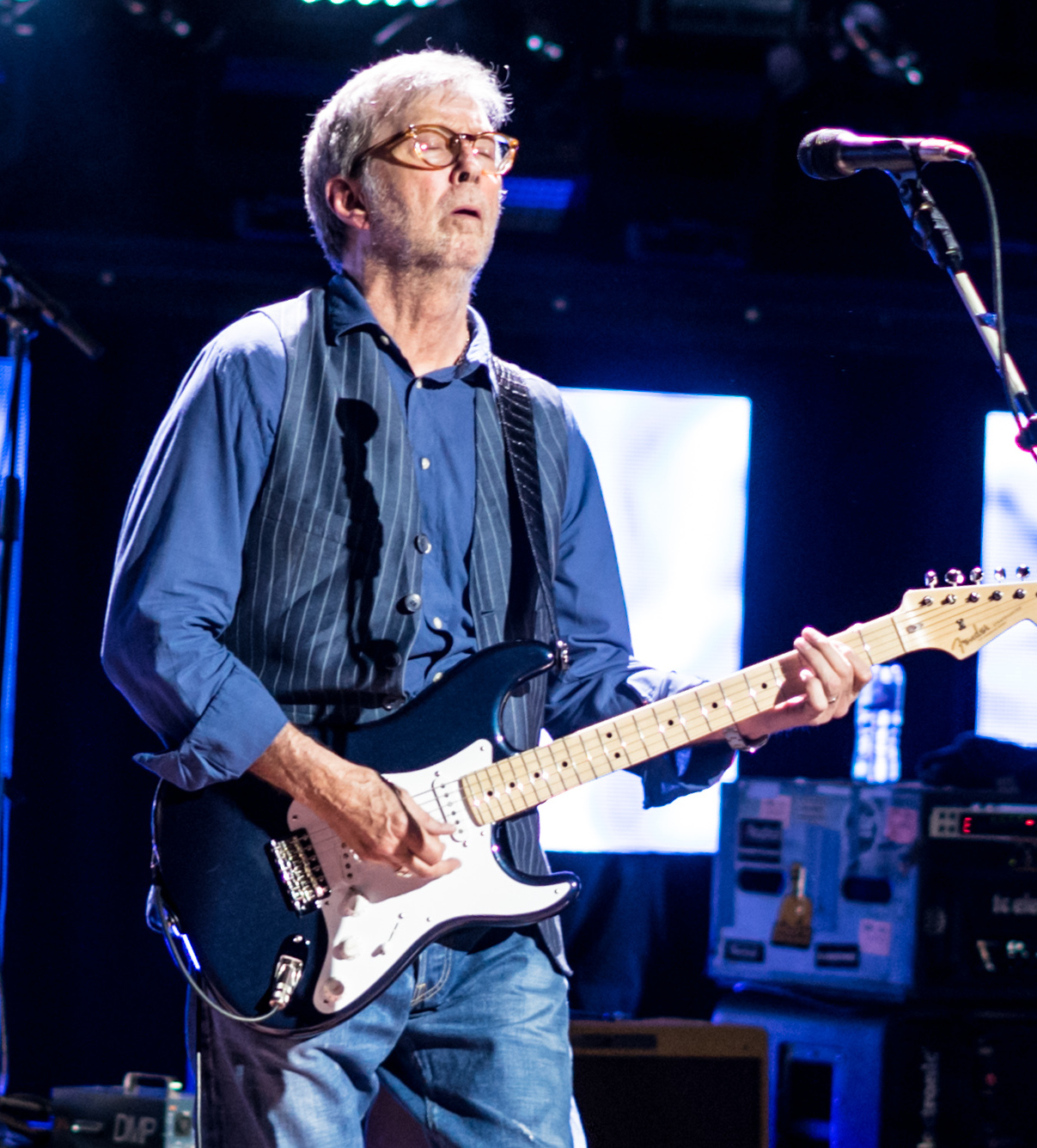
Riding with the King, a collaboration between B. B. King and Eric Clapton, spent 29 consecutive weeks at number one on the UK Jazz & Blues Albums Chart from 18 June 2000 to the end of the year.

The UK Jazz & Blues Albums Chart is a record chart which ranks the best-selling jazz and blues albums in the United Kingdom. Compiled and published by the Official Charts Company, the data is based on each album's weekly physical sales, digital downloads and streams. In 2000, 53 charts were published with nine albums at number one. The first number-one album of the year was the 1959 album Kind of Blue by Miles Davis, which spent the first five weeks of the year atop the chart. The last number-one album of the year was Riding with the King, a collaboration between B. B. King and Eric Clapton, which topped the chart from June until the end of the year.

The most successful album on the UK Jazz & Blues Albums Chart in 2000 was Riding with the King, which spent 29 consecutive weeks at number one from June onwards. Kind of Blue by Miles Davis spent six weeks at number one, as did the Jazz FM various artists compilation The Very Best of Smooth Jazz. Virgin/EMI's compilation The Best Jazz Album in the World... Ever! spent five weeks at number one. The only two other releases to spend more than a single week atop the chart in 2000 were Tourist by St Germain and Absolute Benson by George Benson. Riding with the King finished 2000 as the 142nd best-selling album of the year in the UK.

== Chart history ==
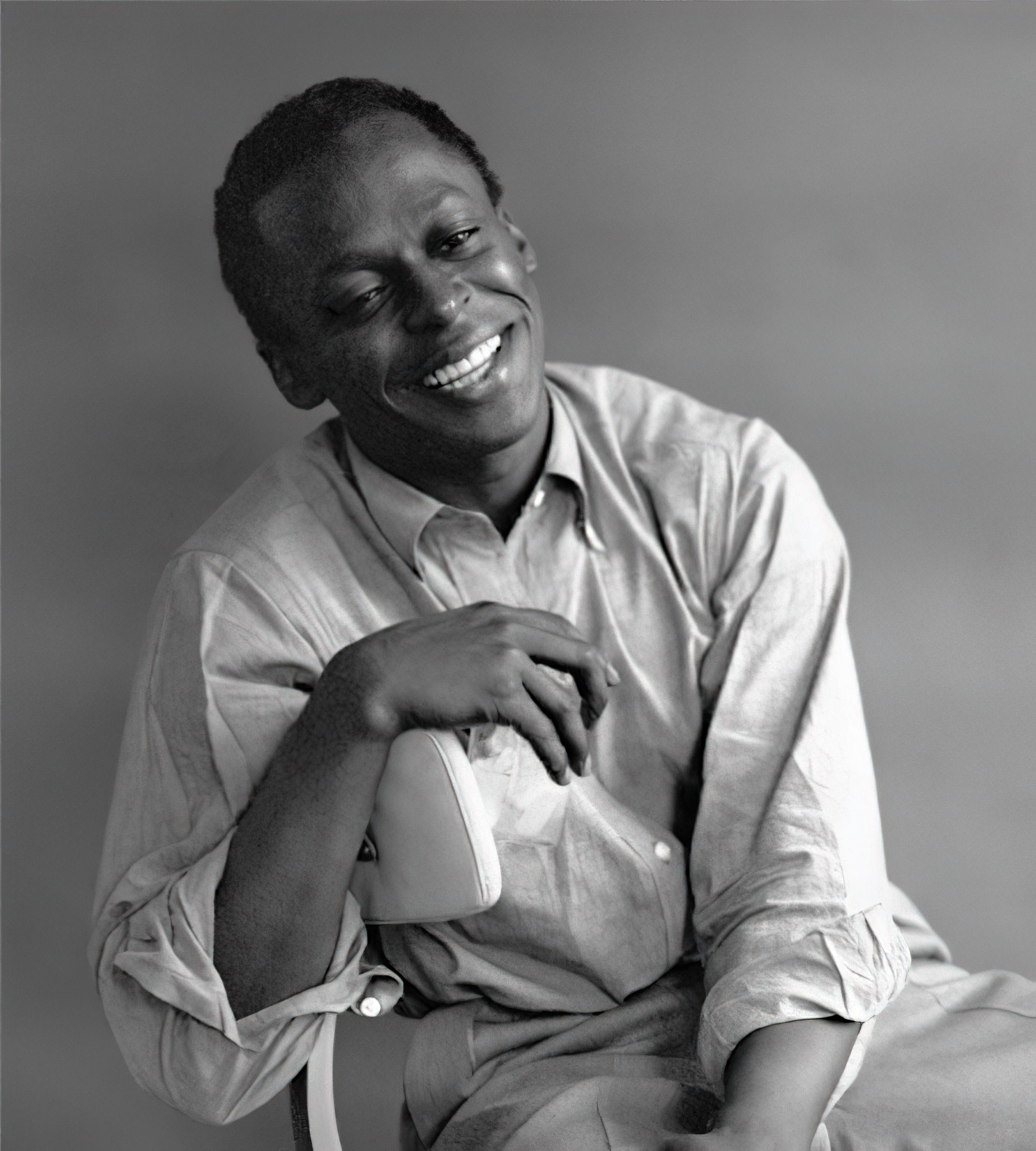
Kind of Blue by Miles Davis spent a total of six weeks (including a run of five consecutive weeks) at number one on the UK Jazz & Blues Albums Chart in 2000.

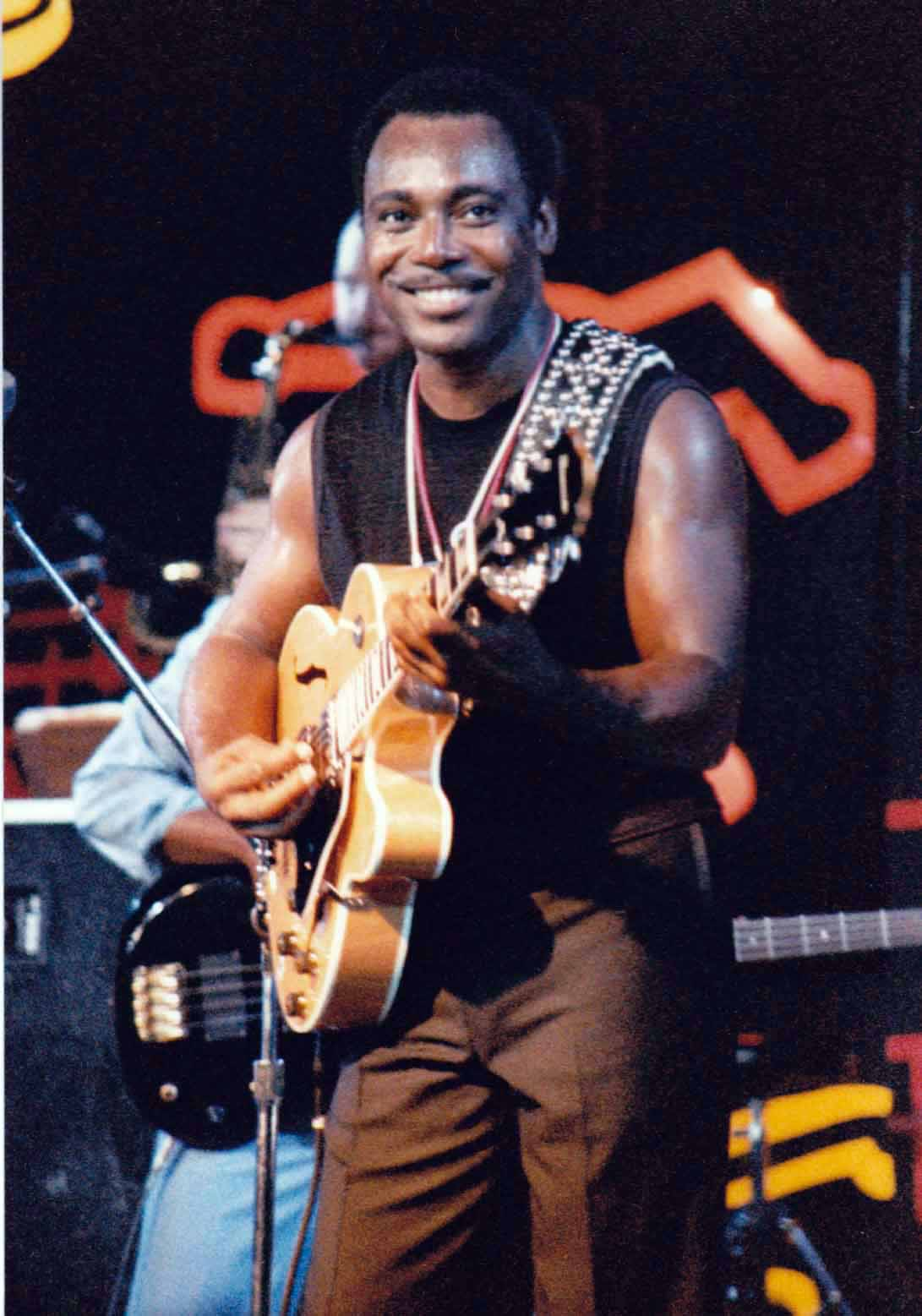
George Benson spent two weeks at number one in May/June 2000 with Absolute Benson.

Key
| † | Indicates best-selling jazz/blues album of 2000 |

| Issue date | Album | Artist(s) | Record label(s) | Ref. |
|---|---|---|---|---|
| 2 January | Kind of Blue | Miles Davis | Columbia | |
| 9 January | Kind of Blue | Miles Davis | Columbia | |
| 16 January | Kind of Blue | Miles Davis | Columbia | |
| 23 January | Kind of Blue | Miles Davis | Columbia | |
| 30 January | Kind of Blue | Miles Davis | Columbia | |
| 6 February | The Very Best of Smooth Jazz | various artists | Jazz FM | |
| 13 February | The Very Best of Smooth Jazz | various artists | Jazz FM | |
| 20 February | The Very Best of Smooth Jazz | various artists | Jazz FM | |
| 27 February | The Very Best of Smooth Jazz | various artists | Jazz FM | |
| 5 March | The Very Best of Smooth Jazz | various artists | Jazz FM | |
| 12 March | The Very Best of Smooth Jazz | various artists | Jazz FM | |
| 19 March | Come by Me | Harry Connick Jr. | Columbia | |
| 26 March | The Best of Paolo Conte | Paolo Conte | Nonesuch | |
| 2 April | Kind of Blue | Miles Davis | Columbia | |
| 9 April | The Best Jazz Album in the World... Ever! | various artists | Virgin/EMI | |
| 16 April | The Best Jazz Album in the World... Ever! | various artists | Virgin/EMI | |
| 23 April | The Best Jazz Album in the World... Ever! | various artists | Virgin/EMI | |
| 30 April | The Best Jazz Album in the World... Ever! | various artists | Virgin/EMI | |
| 7 May | The Best Jazz Album in the World... Ever! | various artists | Virgin/EMI | |
| 14 May | Tourist | St Germain | Blue Note | |
| 21 May | Groovin' | Bill Wyman's Rhythm Kings | Papillon | |
| 28 May | Absolute Benson | George Benson | GRP | |
| 4 June | Absolute Benson | George Benson | GRP | |
| 11 June | Tourist | St Germain | Blue Note | |
| 18 June | Riding with the King † | B. B. King, Eric Clapton | Reprise | |
| 25 June | Riding with the King † | B. B. King, Eric Clapton | Reprise | |
| 2 July | Riding with the King † | B. B. King, Eric Clapton | Reprise | |
| 9 July | Riding with the King † | B. B. King, Eric Clapton | Reprise | |
| 16 July | Riding with the King † | B. B. King, Eric Clapton | Reprise | |
| 23 July | Riding with the King † | B. B. King, Eric Clapton | Reprise | |
| 30 July | Riding with the King † | B. B. King, Eric Clapton | Reprise | |
| 6 August | Riding with the King † | B. B. King, Eric Clapton | Reprise | |
| 13 August | Riding with the King † | B. B. King, Eric Clapton | Reprise | |
| 20 August | Riding with the King † | B. B. King, Eric Clapton | Reprise | |
| 27 August | Riding with the King † | B. B. King, Eric Clapton | Reprise | |
| 3 September | Riding with the King † | B. B. King, Eric Clapton | Reprise | |
| 10 September | Riding with the King † | B. B. King, Eric Clapton | Reprise | |
| 17 September | Riding with the King † | B. B. King, Eric Clapton | Reprise | |
| 24 September | Riding with the King † | B. B. King, Eric Clapton | Reprise | |
| 1 October | Riding with the King † | B. B. King, Eric Clapton | Reprise | |
| 8 October | Riding with the King † | B. B. King, Eric Clapton | Reprise | |
| 15 October | Riding with the King † | B. B. King, Eric Clapton | Reprise | |
| 22 October | Riding with the King † | B. B. King, Eric Clapton | Reprise | |
| 29 October | Riding with the King † | B. B. King, Eric Clapton | Reprise | |
| 5 November | Riding with the King † | B. B. King, Eric Clapton | Reprise | |
| 12 November | Riding with the King † | B. B. King, Eric Clapton | Reprise | |
| 19 November | Riding with the King † | B. B. King, Eric Clapton | Reprise | |
| 26 November | Riding with the King † | B. B. King, Eric Clapton | Reprise | |
| 3 December | Riding with the King † | B. B. King, Eric Clapton | Reprise | |
| 10 December | Riding with the King † | B. B. King, Eric Clapton | Reprise | |
| 17 December | Riding with the King † | B. B. King, Eric Clapton | Reprise | |
| 24 December | Riding with the King † | B. B. King, Eric Clapton | Reprise | |
| 31 December | Riding with the King † | B. B. King, Eric Clapton | Reprise | |

== See also ==
- 2000 in British music
