= List of UK Independent Singles Breakers Chart number ones of the 2000s =

This is the list of the number ones on the UK Independent Singles Breakers Chart during the 2000s.

== Number ones ==
Key
No.	nth single to top the UK Independent Singles Breakers Chart
re	Return of a single to number one

Contents
- 2009
- 2010s →

No.	Artist (Note: The artist, single, record label, date of reaching number one and number of weeks at number one are those given by the Official Charts Company.)	Single	Record label	Reached number one	Weeks at number one
2009
1	Lazee featuring Neverstore	"Hold On"	Hard2Beat	4 July 2009	2
2	Master Shortie	"Dead End"	Odd One Out	18 July 2009	2
3	Friendly Fires	"Jump in the Pool"	XL	1 August 2009	1
4	Sub Focus	"Rock It" / "Follow the Light"	RAM	8 August 2009	2
5	The Temper Trap	"Sweet Disposition"	Infectious	22 August 2009	4
6	Friendly Fires	"Kiss of Life"	XL	19 September 2009	1
re	Sub Focus	"Rock It" / "Follow the Light"	RAM	26 September 2009	2
7	All Time Low	"Weightless"	Hopeless	10 October 2009	1
8	The Big Pink	"Dominos"	4AD	17 October 2009	3
9	Duck Sauce	"aNYway"	Data	7 November 2009	2
10	Chartjackers	"I've Got Nothing"	Swinging Mantis	21 November 2009	1
11	Taken by Trees	"Sweet Child o' Mine"	Rough Trade	28 November 2009	4
12	Sir Terry Wogan and Aled Jones	"Silver Bells" / "Me and My Teddy Bear"	Bandaged	26 December 2009	1
