= List of UK Jazz & Blues Albums Chart number ones of 2001 =

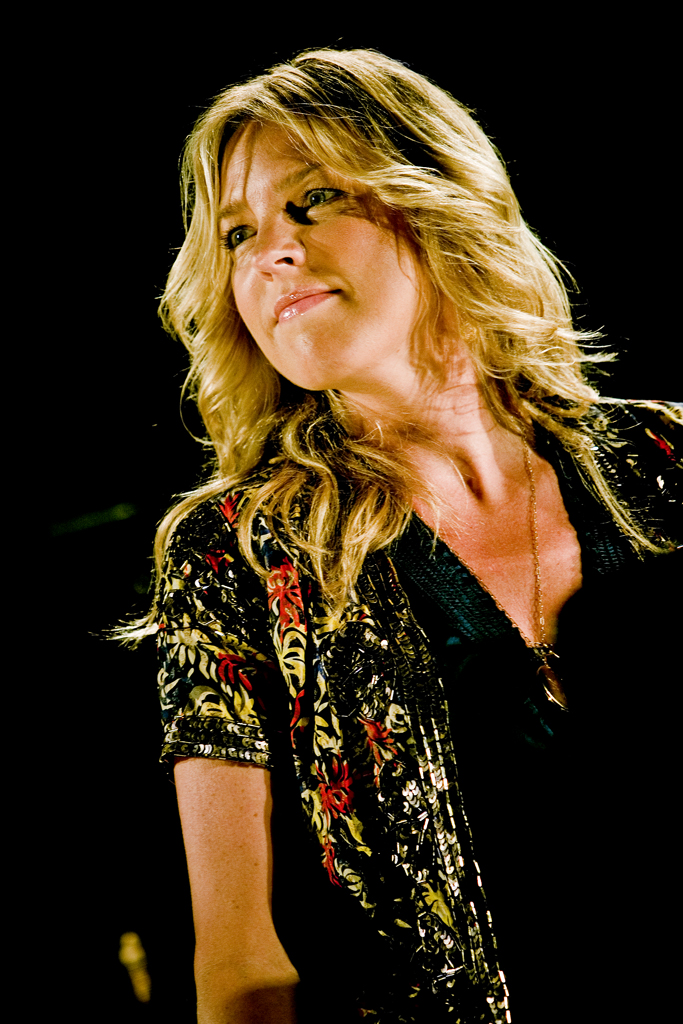
Diana Krall spent 14 weeks in 2001 at number one on the UK Jazz & Blues Albums Chart with her sixth studio album The Look of Love.

The UK Jazz & Blues Albums Chart is a record chart which ranks the best-selling jazz and blues albums in the United Kingdom. Compiled and published by the Official Charts Company, the data is based on each album's weekly physical sales, digital downloads and streams. In 2001, 52 charts were published with 11 albums at number one. The first number-one album of the year was Riding with the King by B. B. King and Eric Clapton, which spent the first four weeks atop the chart at the end of a record 33-week run starting in June 2000. The last number one of the year was The Look of Love, the sixth studio album by Diana Krall, which spent the last six weeks of the year at number one.

The most successful album on the UK Jazz & Blues Albums Chart in 2001 was The Look of Love, which spent a total of 14 weeks at number one over two spells of eight and six weeks between September and December. St Germain's third studio album Tourist was number one for 11 weeks over the course of the year, with its longest run of four weeks taking place in February. Miles Davis topped the chart for nine weeks with his 1959 album Kind of Blue, while Riding with the King by B. B. King and Eric Clapton spent four weeks at the top of the chart. Universal Music TV's compilations The Natural Blues Album and Sunshine spent four and three weeks respectively at the top of the chart.

== Chart history ==
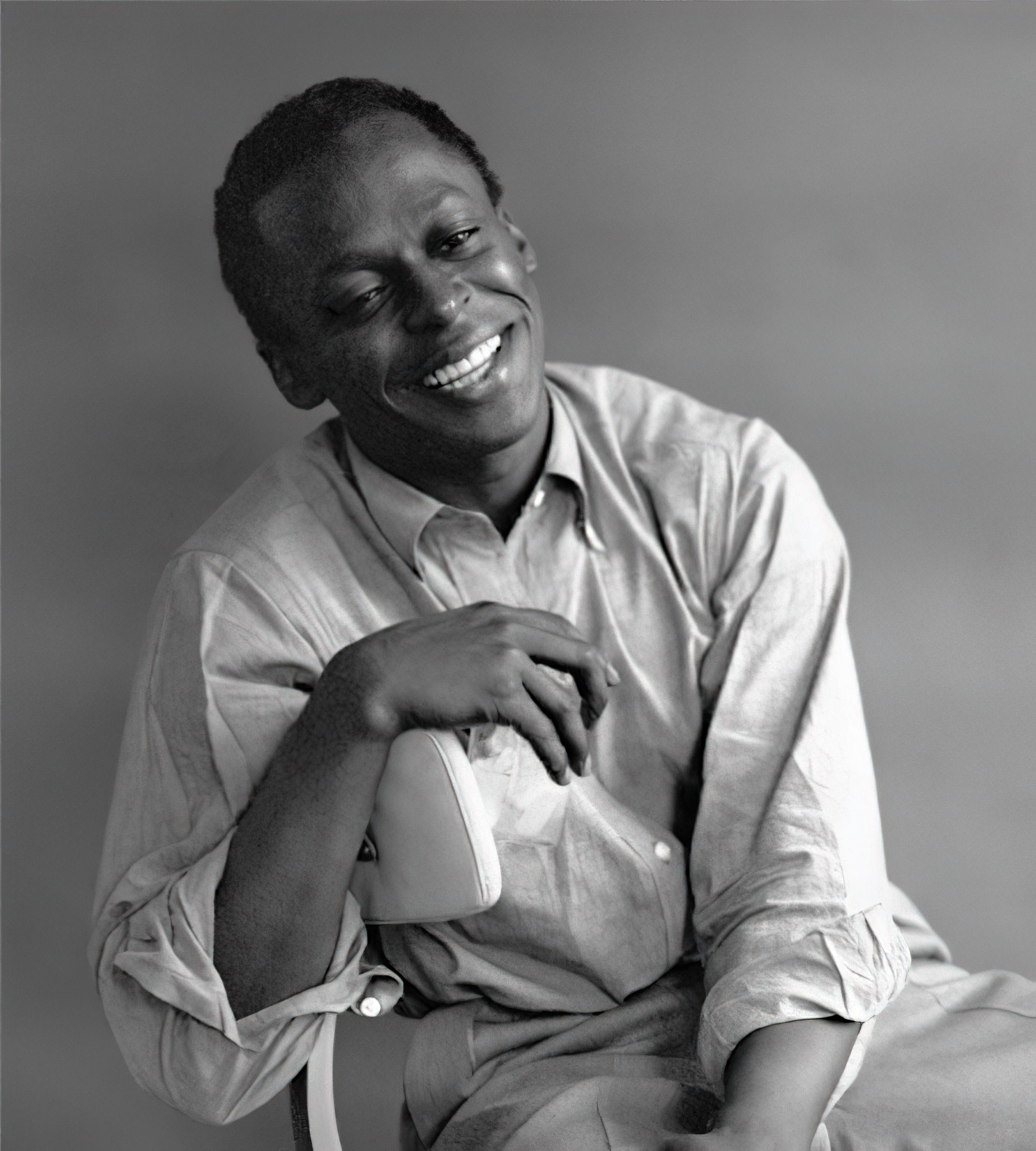
Kind of Blue by Miles Davis spent a total of nine weeks (including a run of four consecutive weeks) at number one on the UK Jazz & Blues Albums Chart in 2001.

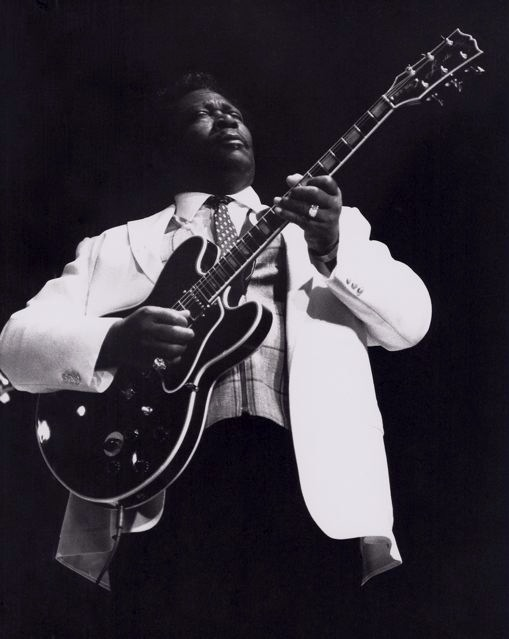
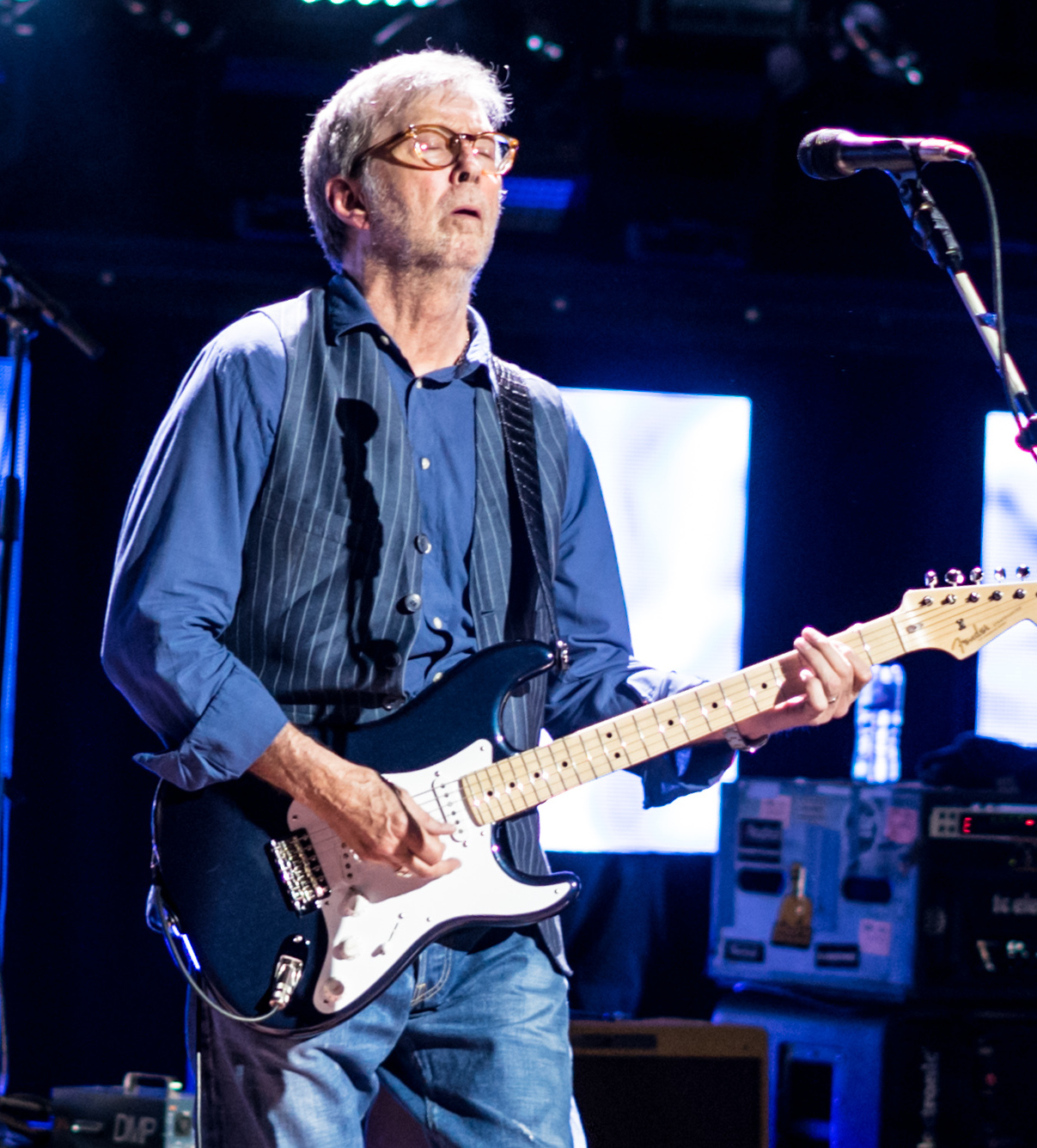
Riding with the King, a collaboration between B. B. King and Eric Clapton, spent the first four weeks of 2001 atop the chart, marking the end of the album's record 33-week run at number one.

Issue date	Album	Artist(s)	Record label(s)	Ref.
7 January	Riding with the King	B. B. King, Eric Clapton	Reprise	
14 January	Riding with the King	B. B. King, Eric Clapton	Reprise	
21 January	Riding with the King	B. B. King, Eric Clapton	Reprise	
28 January	Riding with the King	B. B. King, Eric Clapton	Reprise	
4 February	Tourist	St Germain	Blue Note	
11 February	Tourist	St Germain	Blue Note	
18 February	Tourist	St Germain	Blue Note	
25 February	Tourist	St Germain	Blue Note	
4 March	The Natural Blues Album	various artists	UMTV	
11 March	The Natural Blues Album	various artists	UMTV	
18 March	The Natural Blues Album	various artists	UMTV	
25 March	The Natural Blues Album	various artists	UMTV	
1 April	Kind of Blue	Miles Davis	Columbia	
8 April	Kind of Blue	Miles Davis	Columbia	
15 April	Kind of Blue	Miles Davis	Columbia	
22 April	Kind of Blue	Miles Davis	Columbia	
29 April	Double Bill	Bill Wyman's Rhythm Kings	Papillon	
6 May	Kind of Blue	Miles Davis	Columbia	
13 May	Tourist	St Germain	Blue Note	
20 May	Kind of Blue	Miles Davis	Columbia	
27 May	Tourist	St Germain	Blue Note	
3 June	Driftin'	various artists	Jazz FM	
10 June	Driftin'	various artists	Jazz FM	
17 June	Tourist	St Germain	Blue Note	
24 June	Tourist	St Germain	Blue Note	
1 July	Kind of Blue	Miles Davis	Columbia	
8 July	Sunshine	various artists	UMTV	
15 July	Sunshine	various artists	UMTV	
22 July	Sunshine	various artists	UMTV	
29 July	Kind of Blue	Miles Davis	Columbia	
5 August	Tourist	St Germain	Blue Note	
12 August	Tourist	St Germain	Blue Note	
19 August	Kind of Blue	Miles Davis	Columbia	
26 August	Baduizm	Erykah Badu	MCA	
2 September	Tourist	St Germain	Blue Note	
9 September	Breezin'	various artists	Jazz FM	
16 September	Breezin'	various artists	Jazz FM	
23 September	The Look of Love	Diana Krall	Verve	
30 September	The Look of Love	Diana Krall	Verve	
7 October	The Look of Love	Diana Krall	Verve	
14 October	The Look of Love	Diana Krall	Verve	
21 October	The Look of Love	Diana Krall	Verve	
28 October	The Look of Love	Diana Krall	Verve	
4 November	The Look of Love	Diana Krall	Verve	
11 November	The Look of Love	Diana Krall	Verve	
18 November	Playin' with My Friends: Bennett Sings the Blues	Tony Bennett	Columbia	
25 November	The Look of Love	Diana Krall	Verve	
2 December	The Look of Love	Diana Krall	Verve	
9 December	The Look of Love	Diana Krall	Verve	
16 December	The Look of Love	Diana Krall	Verve	
23 December	The Look of Love	Diana Krall	Verve	
30 December	The Look of Love	Diana Krall	Verve	

== See also ==
- 2001 in British music
