= List of Official Subscription Plays Chart number-one songs of the 2000s =

This is the list of the number ones of the Official Subscription Plays Chart during the 2000s. The first song to top the chart was "I Kissed a Girl" by Katy Perry.

== Number ones ==
Artist (Note: The artist, song, date of reaching number one and number of weeks at number one are those given by the Official Charts Company.)	Song	Record label (Note: The record labels are those given by the Official Charts Company.)	Reached number one (for the week ending)	Weeks at number one
2009
David Guetta featuring Akon	"Sexy Chick"	Positiva/Virgin	3 October 2009	2
The Black Eyed Peas	"I Gotta Feeling"	Interscope	17 October 2009	1
Shakira	"She Wolf"	Epic	24 October 2009	1
Alexandra Burke featuring Flo Rida	"Bad Boys"	Syco	31 October 2009	1
Cheryl Cole	"Fight for This Love"	Fascination	7 November 2009	3
The Black Eyed Peas	"Meet Me Halfway"	Interscope	28 November 2009	1
Cheryl Cole	"Fight for This Love"	Fascination	5 December 2009	1
The Black Eyed Peas	"Meet Me Halfway"	Interscope	12 December 2009	1
Lady Gaga	"Bad Romance"	Interscope	19 December 2009	2
