= List of UK Independent Album Breakers Chart number ones of the 2000s =

This is the list of the number-one albums of the UK Indie Breakers Chart during the 2000s.

== Number-one albums ==
Key
No.	nth album to top the UK Independent Album Breakers Chart
re	Return of an album to number one

Contents
2009 • 2010s →

No.	Artist (Note: The artist, album, date of reaching number one and number of weeks at number one are those given by the Official Charts Company.)	Album	Record label (Note: The record labels are those given by the Official Charts Company.)	Reached number one	Weeks at number one
2009
1	Friendly Fires	Friendly Fires	XL	4 July 2009	2
2	The Duckworth Lewis Method	Duckworth Lewis	Divine Comedy	18 July 2009	1
re	Friendly Fires	Friendly Fires	XL	25 July 2009	4
3	The Temper Trap	Conditions	Infectious	22 August 2009	1
4	The xx	xx	Young Turks	29 August 2009	2
re	Friendly Fires	Friendly Fires	XL	12 September 2009	3
5	Monsters of Folk	Monsters of Folk	Rough Trade	27 September 2009	1
re	The xx	xx	Young Turks	4 October 2009	1
6	Cerys Matthews	Don't Look Down	Rainbow City	11 October 2009	1
7	Sub Focus	Sub Focus	Ram Records	18 October 2009	2
8	Pink Martini	Splendor in the Grass	Wrasse	1 November 2009	1
9	Julian Casablancas	Phrazes for the Young	Rough Trade	8 November 2009	1
10	Flight of the Conchords	I Told You I Was Freaky	Sub Pop	15 November 2009	1
11	The Big Pink	A Brief History of Love	4AD	22 November 2009	2
12	Jace Everett	Red Revelations	Hump Head	12 December 2009	1
re	The xx	xx	Young Turks	19 December 2009	3
