= List of UK Jazz & Blues Albums Chart number ones of 1998 =

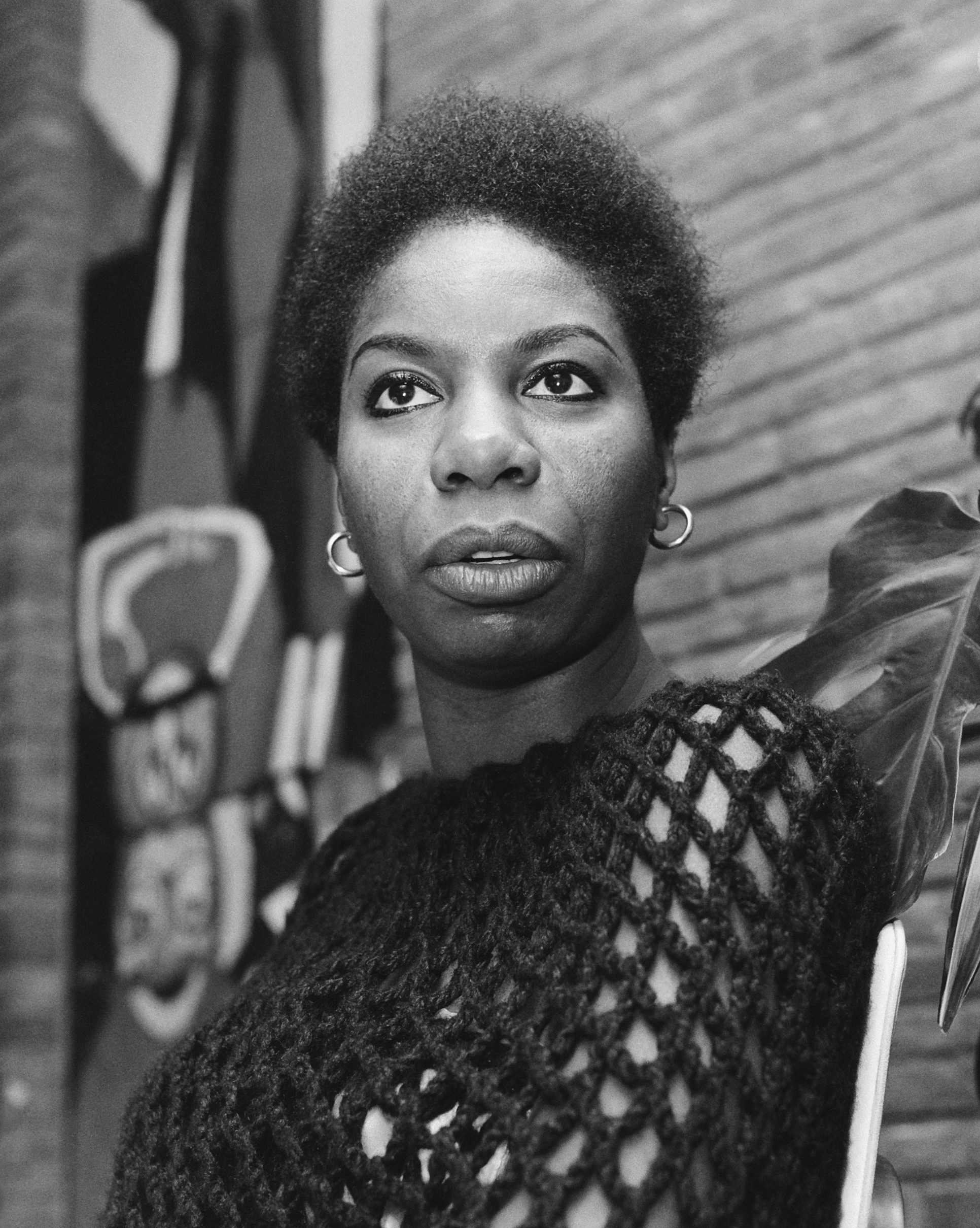
The Nina Simone greatest hits collection Blue for You: The Very Best of Nina Simone spent the most weeks atop the UK Jazz & Blues Albums Chart in 1998, with 15 weeks at number one.

The UK Jazz & Blues Albums Chart is a record chart which ranks the best-selling jazz and blues albums in the United Kingdom. Compiled and published by the Official Charts Company, the data is based on each album's weekly physical sales, digital downloads and streams. In 1998, 52 charts were published with 13 albums at number one. The first number-one album of the year was Kenny G's second greatest hits album Greatest Hits, which topped the first two charts of January. The last number-one album of the year was the Global Television various artists compilation The Very Best of Jazz After Dark, which was number one for four weeks.

The most successful album on the UK Jazz & Blues Albums Chart in 1998 was Blue for You: The Very Best of Nina Simone by Nina Simone, which spent a total of 15 weeks at number one across two spells. Blues on the Bayou by B. B. King was the second most successful single-artist album, spending three weeks at number one. Many of the rest of the published charts during 1998 were topped by various artists compilations, including The Very Best of Latin Jazz (12 weeks), The Very Best of Jazz After Dark (five weeks), and The Very Best of Jazz Moods (four weeks). Blue for You: The Very Best of Nina Simone finished 1998 as the 148th best-selling album of the year in the UK.

== Chart history ==
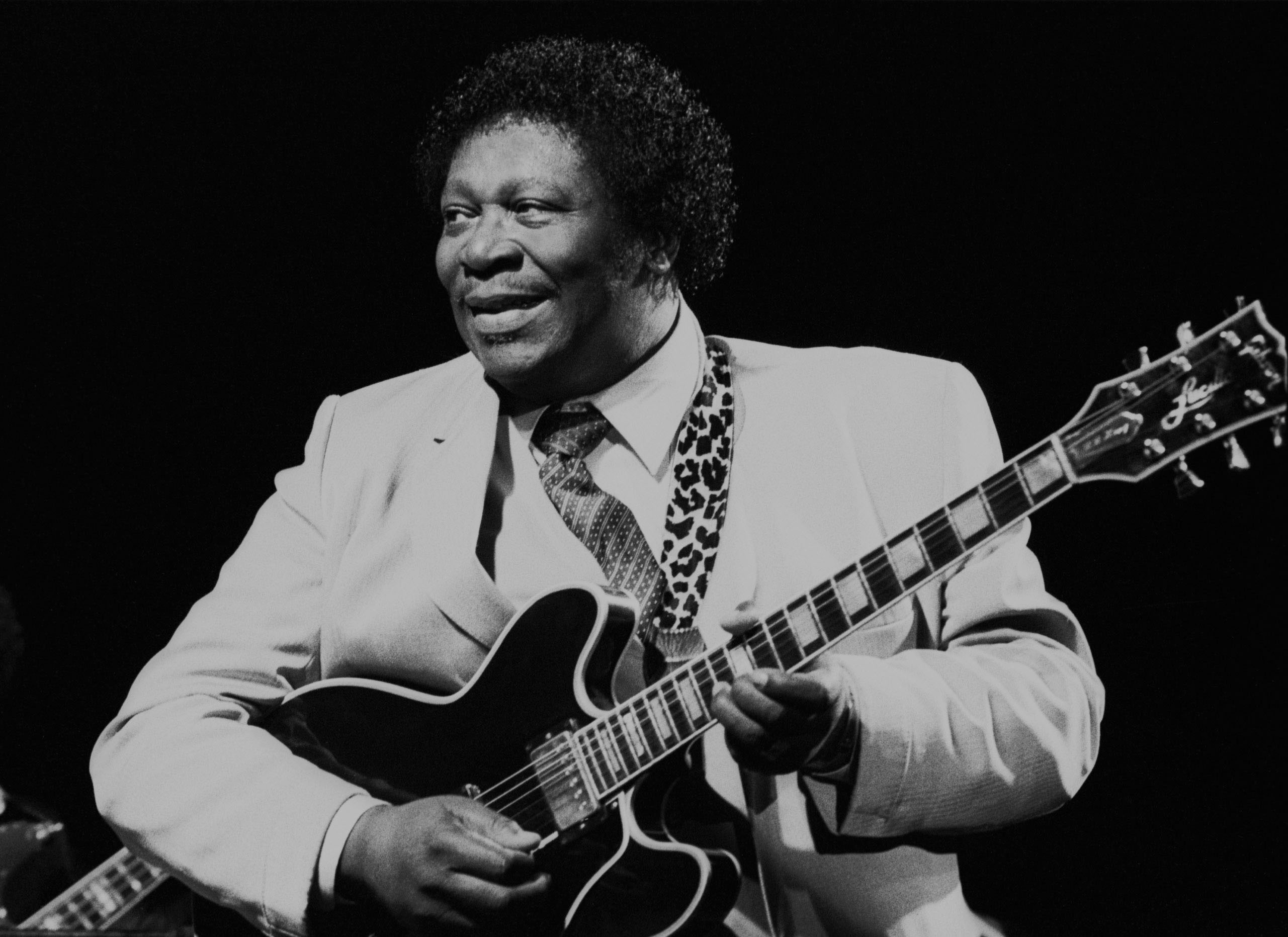
B. B. King's Blues on the Bayou was the second most successful single-artist album on the UK Jazz & Blues Albums Chart in 1998, spending three weeks at number one.

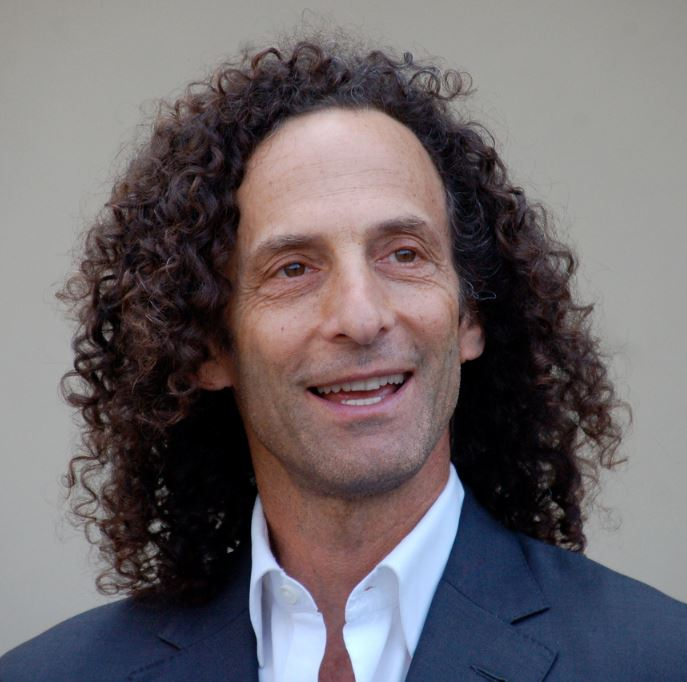
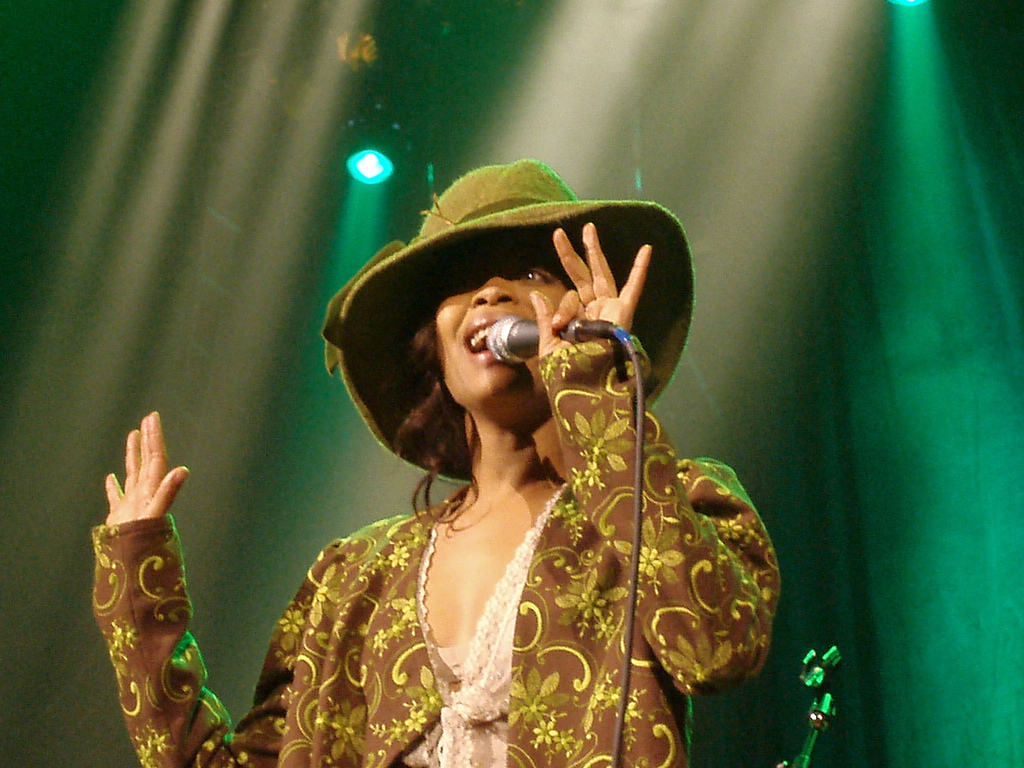
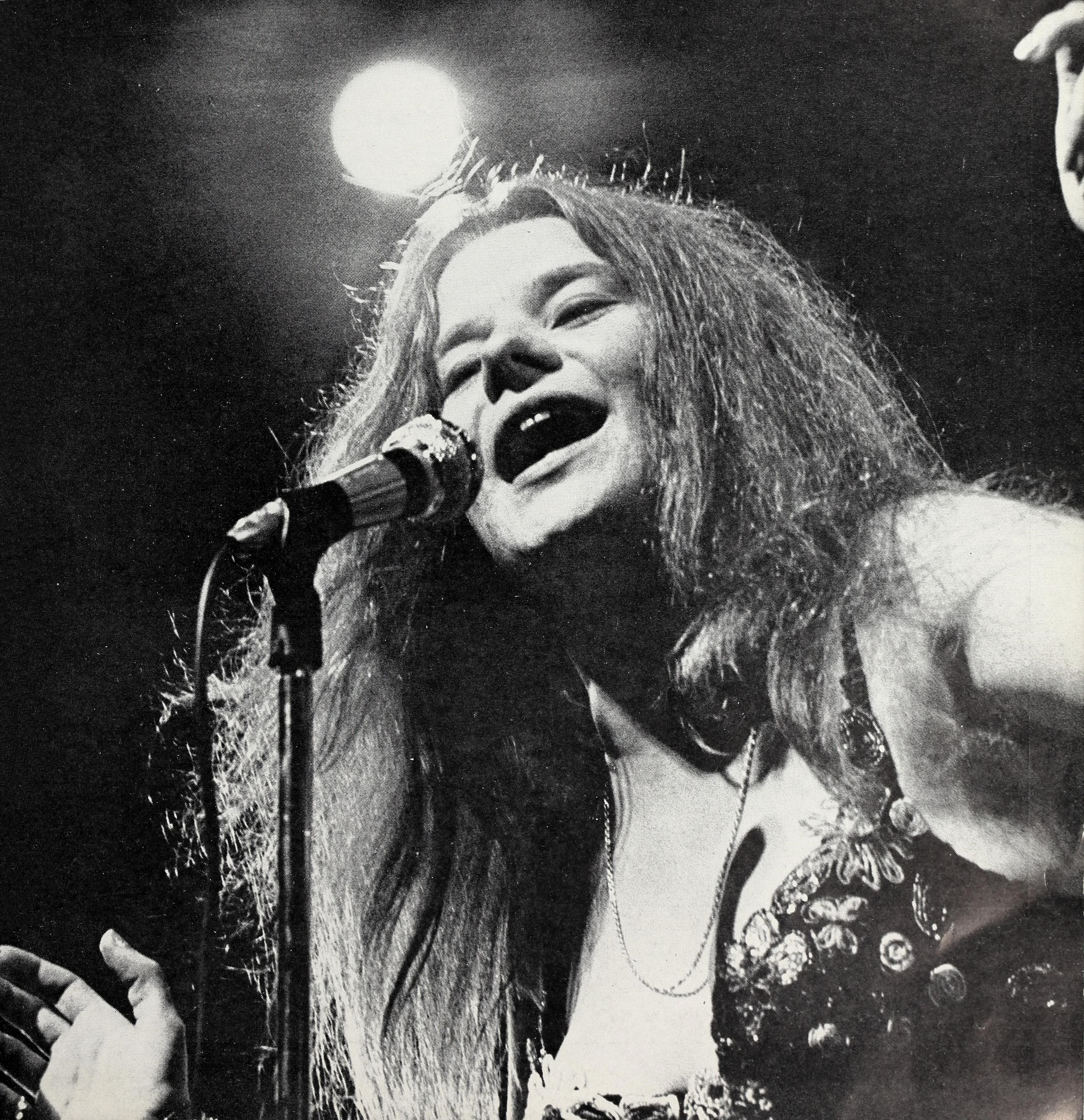
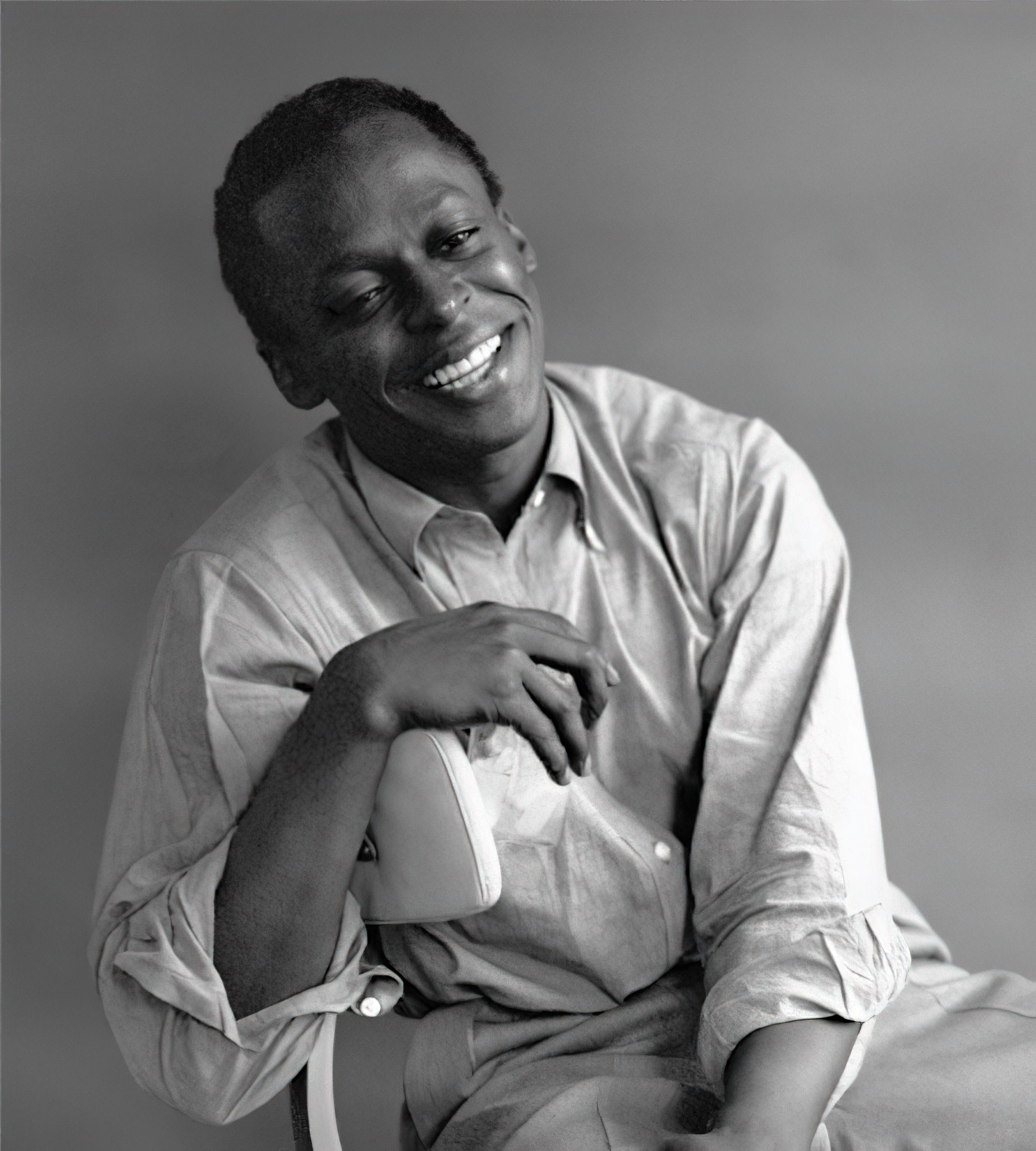
Greatest Hits by Kenny G (top), Baduizm by Erykah Badu (second from top), The Ultimate Collection by Janis Joplin (third from top) and Kind of Blue by Miles Davis (bottom) each spent two weeks atop the UK Jazz & Blues Albums Chart in 1998.

Key
†	Indicates best-selling jazz/blues album of 1998

Issue date	Album	Artist(s)	Record label(s)	Ref.
4 January	Greatest Hits	Kenny G	Arista	
11 January	Greatest Hits	Kenny G	Arista	
18 January	Baduizm	Erykah Badu	MCA	
25 January	Baduizm	Erykah Badu	MCA	
1 February	Blue for You: The Very Best of Nina Simone †	Nina Simone	Global Television	
8 February	Blue for You: The Very Best of Nina Simone †	Nina Simone	Global Television	
15 February	Blue for You: The Very Best of Nina Simone †	Nina Simone	Global Television	
22 February	Blue for You: The Very Best of Nina Simone †	Nina Simone	Global Television	
1 March	Blue for You: The Very Best of Nina Simone †	Nina Simone	Global Television	
8 March	Blue for You: The Very Best of Nina Simone †	Nina Simone	Global Television	
15 March	Blue for You: The Very Best of Nina Simone †	Nina Simone	Global Television	
22 March	Blue for You: The Very Best of Nina Simone †	Nina Simone	Global Television	
29 March	Blue for You: The Very Best of Nina Simone †	Nina Simone	Global Television	
5 April	Blue for You: The Very Best of Nina Simone †	Nina Simone	Global Television	
12 April	Fundamental	Bonnie Raitt	Capitol	
19 April	Blue for You: The Very Best of Nina Simone †	Nina Simone	Global Television	
26 April	Blue for You: The Very Best of Nina Simone †	Nina Simone	Global Television	
3 May	Blue for You: The Very Best of Nina Simone †	Nina Simone	Global Television	
10 May	Blue for You: The Very Best of Nina Simone †	Nina Simone	Global Television	
17 May	Blue for You: The Very Best of Nina Simone †	Nina Simone	Global Television	
24 May	The Robert Johnson Songbook	Peter Green, Nigel Watson	Artisan	
31 May	The Very Best of Latin Jazz	various artists	Global Television	
7 June	The Very Best of Latin Jazz	various artists	Global Television	
14 June	The Very Best of Latin Jazz	various artists	Global Television	
21 June	The Very Best of Latin Jazz	various artists	Global Television	
28 June	The Very Best of Latin Jazz	various artists	Global Television	
5 July	The Very Best of Latin Jazz	various artists	Global Television	
12 July	The Very Best of Latin Jazz	various artists	Global Television	
19 July	The Very Best of Latin Jazz	various artists	Global Television	
26 July	The Very Best of Latin Jazz	various artists	Global Television	
2 August	The Very Best of Latin Jazz	various artists	Global Television	
9 August	The Very Best of Latin Jazz	various artists	Global Television	
16 August	The Very Best of Latin Jazz	various artists	Global Television	
23 August	The Ultimate Collection	Janis Joplin	Columbia	
30 August	The Ultimate Collection	Janis Joplin	Columbia	
6 September	The Very Best of Jazz Moods	various artists	Telstar	
13 September	The Very Best of Jazz Moods	various artists	Telstar	
20 September	The Very Best of Jazz Moods	various artists	Telstar	
27 September	The Very Best of Jazz Moods	various artists	Telstar	
4 October	Kind of Blue	Miles Davis	Columbia	
11 October	Kind of Blue	Miles Davis	Columbia	
18 October	Rites	Jan Garbarek	ECM	
25 October	Blues on the Bayou	B. B. King	MCA	
1 November	Blues on the Bayou	B. B. King	MCA	
8 November	Blues on the Bayou	B. B. King	MCA	
15 November	Swing! The Ultimate Big Band Album	various artists	RCA Victor	
22 November	Swing! The Ultimate Big Band Album	various artists	RCA Victor	
29 November	The Very Best of Jazz After Dark	various artists	Global Television	
6 December	The Very Best of Jazz After Dark	various artists	Global Television	
13 December	The Very Best of Jazz After Dark	various artists	Global Television	
20 December	The Very Best of Jazz After Dark	various artists	Global Television	
27 December	The Very Best of Jazz After Dark	various artists	Global Television	

== See also ==
- 1998 in British music
