= List of UK R&B Singles Chart number ones of 2006 =

The UK R&B Chart is a weekly chart that ranks the 40 biggest-selling singles and albums that are classified in the R&B genre in the United Kingdom. The chart is compiled by the Official Charts Company, and is based on both physical and digital sales. This is a list of the UK's biggest R&B hits of 2006.

== Number ones ==
Key
†	Best-selling R&B single of the year

Issue date	Single	Artist
1 January	"When I'm Gone	Eminem
8 January	"When I'm Gone	Eminem
15 January	"When I'm Gone	Eminem
22 January	"Nasty Girl"	The Notorious B.I.G. featuring Diddy, Jagged Edge, Nelly, and Avery Storm
29 January	"Nasty Girl"	The Notorious B.I.G. featuring Diddy, Jagged Edge, Nelly, and Avery Storm
5 February	"Run It!"	Chris Brown featuring Juelz Santana
12 February	"Nasty Girl"	The Notorious B.I.G. featuring Diddy, Jagged Edge, Nelly and Avery Storm
19 February	"Nasty Girl"	The Notorious B.I.G. featuring Diddy, Jagged Edge, Nelly and Avery Storm
26 February	"Put Your Records On"	Corinne Bailey Rae
5 March	"Beep"	The Pussycat Dolls featuring Will.I.Am
12 March	"Beep"	The Pussycat Dolls featuring Will.I.Am
19 March	"Pump It"	The Black Eyed Peas
26 March	"So Sick"	Ne-Yo
2 April	"So Sick"	Ne-Yo
9 April	"Crazy" †	Gnarls Barkley
16 April	"Crazy" †	Gnarls Barkley
23 April	"Crazy" †	Gnarls Barkley
30 April	"Crazy" †	Gnarls Barkley
7 May	"Crazy" †	Gnarls Barkley
14 May	"Crazy" †	Gnarls Barkley
21 May	"Crazy" †	Gnarls Barkley
28 May	"Crazy" †	Gnarls Barkley
4 June	"Crazy" †	Gnarls Barkley
11 June	"Crazy" †	Gnarls Barkley
18 June	"Hips Don't Lie"	Shakira featuring Wyclef Jean
25 June	"Hips Don't Lie"	Shakira featuring Wyclef Jean
2 July	"Hips Don't Lie"	Shakira featuring Wyclef Jean
9 July	"Hips Don't Lie"	Shakira featuring Wyclef Jean
16 July	"Hips Don't Lie"	Shakira featuring Wyclef Jean
23 July	"Unfaithful"	Rihanna
30 July	"Ain't No Other Man"	Christina Aguilera
6 August	"Hips Don't Lie"	Shakira featuring Wyclef Jean
13 August	"Hips Don't Lie"	Shakira featuring Wyclef Jean
20 August	"Ridin'"	Chamillionaire featuring Krayzie Bone
27 August	"Déjà Vu"	Beyoncé featuring Jay-Z
3 September	"SexyBack"	Justin Timberlake
10 September	"SexyBack"	Justin Timberlake
17 September	"SexyBack"	Justin Timberlake
24 September	"SexyBack"	Justin Timberlake
1 October	"I Don't Need a Man"	The Pussycat Dolls
8 October	"Come to Me"	P. Diddy featuring Nicole Scherzinger
15 October	"Come to Me"	P. Diddy featuring Nicole Scherzinger
22 October	"If You Got the Money"	Jamie T
29 October	"Irreplaceable"	Beyoncé
5 November	"Irreplaceable"	Beyoncé
12 November	"Irreplaceable"	Beyoncé
19 November	"Smack That"	Akon featuring Eminem
26 November	"Smack That"	Akon featuring Eminem
3 December	"Smack That"	Akon featuring Eminem
10 December	"Smack That"	Akon featuring Eminem
17 December	"Tell Me"	P. Diddy featuring Christina Aguilera
24 December	"Smack That"	Akon featuring Eminem
31 December	"Tell Me"	P. Diddy featuring Christina Aguilera

== See also ==
- List of UK Dance Singles Chart number ones of 2006
- List of UK Independent Singles Chart number ones of 2006
- List of UK Singles Downloads Chart number ones of the 2000s
- List of UK Rock & Metal Singles Chart number ones of 2006
- List of UK R&B Albums Chart number ones of 2006
