= List of UK Jazz & Blues Albums Chart number ones of 1995 =

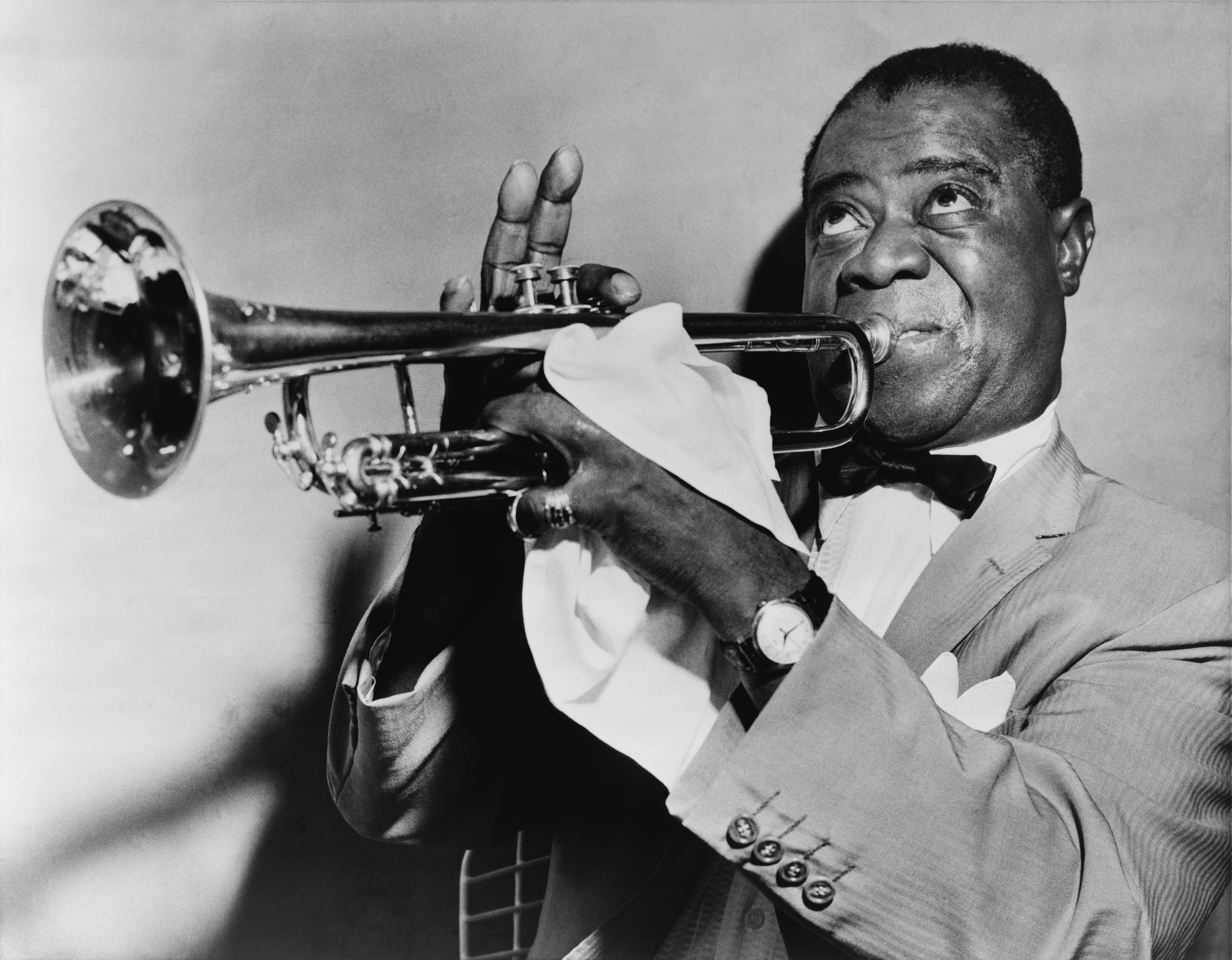
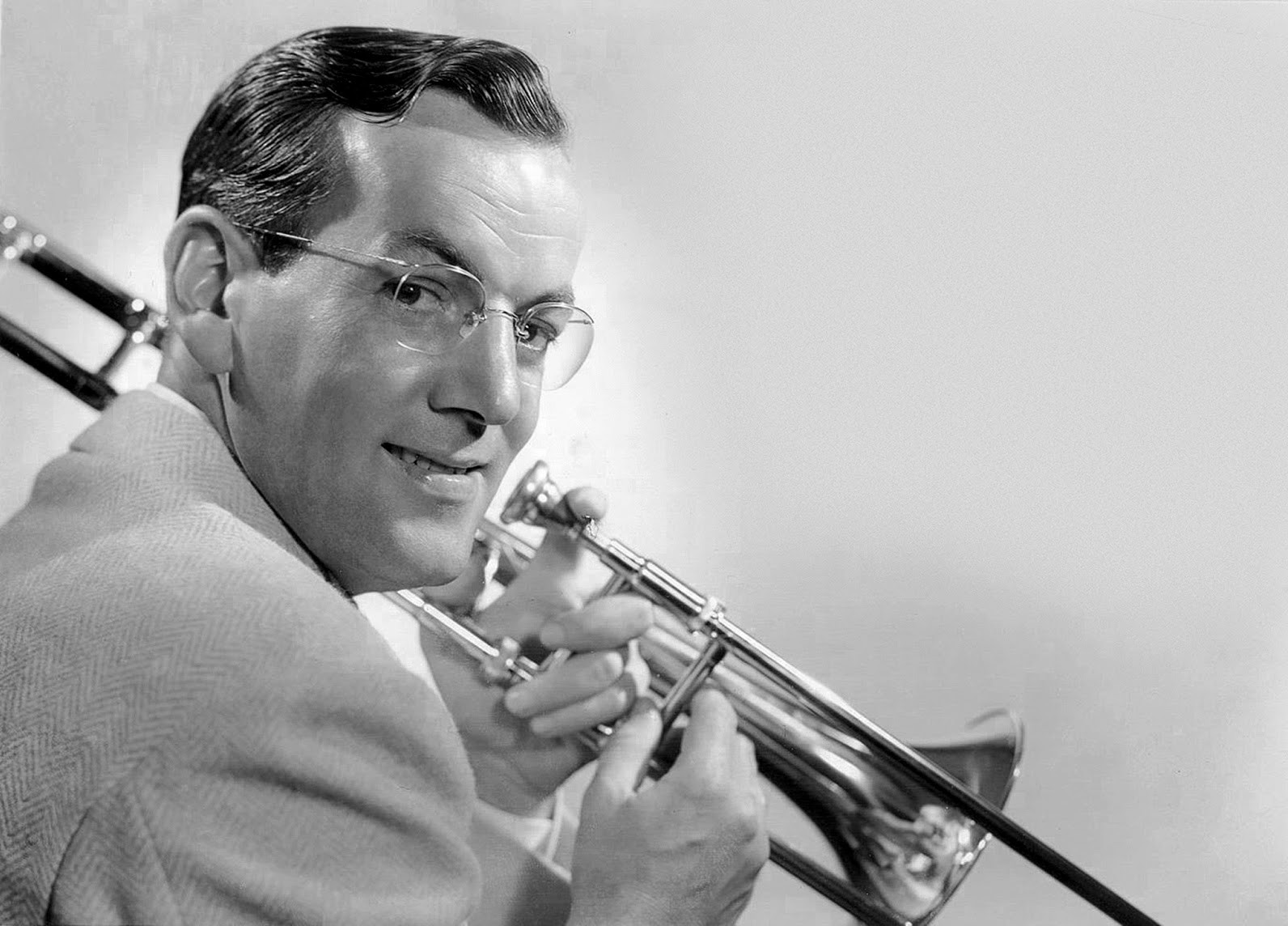
We Have All the Time in the World by Louis Armstrong (top) and The Lost Recordings by Glenn Miller (bottom) were the most successful single-artist albums on the UK Jazz & Blues Albums Chart in 1995, each spending seven weeks at number one.

The UK Jazz & Blues Albums Chart is a record chart which ranks the best-selling jazz and blues albums in the United Kingdom. Compiled and published by the Official Charts Company, the data is based on each album's weekly physical sales, digital downloads and streams. In 1995, 53 charts were published with 15 albums at number one. The first number-one album of the year was We Have All the Time in the World, a compilation by Louis Armstrong, which spent the first seven weeks of 1995 atop the chart. The last number-one of the year was the EMI various artists compilation That's Jazz, which topped the chart from 19 November until the end of the year – also a period of seven weeks.

The most successful album on the UK Jazz & Blues Albums Chart in 1995 was the Columbia various artists compilation Mundo Latino, which spent eight weeks atop the chart between June and August. The seven-week spells of We Have All the Time in the World and That's Jazz were matched by Glenn Miller's The Lost Recordings, which topped the chart on four separate occasions during 1995, first reaching number one on 19 February. The Blue Note collection Best of Blue Note Sampler spent five weeks at number one during 1995. Gary Moore spent six weeks at number one, with two different releases topping the chart for three weeks each – Ballads & Blues 1982–1994 and Blues for Greeny.

== Chart history ==
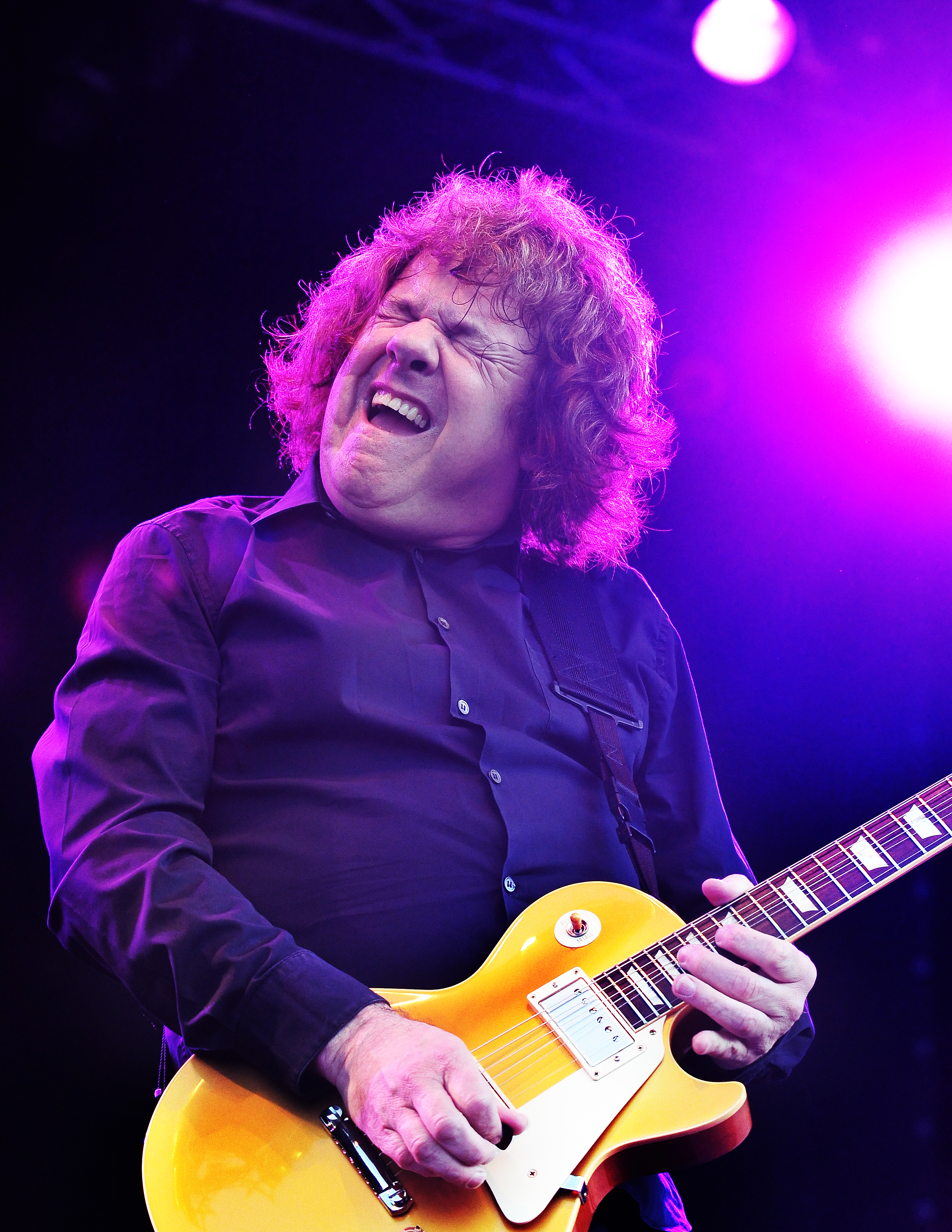
Blues guitarist Gary Moore spent six weeks at number one on the UK Jazz & Blues Albums Chart in 1995, with the albums Ballads & Blues 1982–1994 and Blues for Greeny each topping the chart for three consecutive weeks.

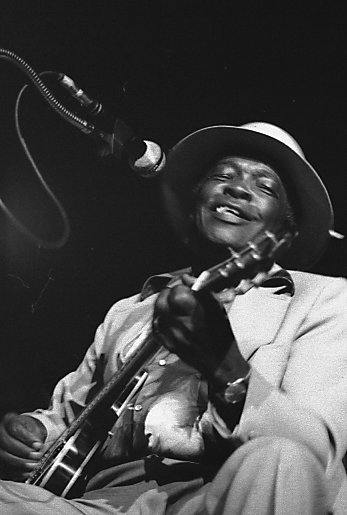
John Lee Hooker's penultimate studio album Chill Out was number one on the UK Jazz & Blues Albums Chart for three weeks between February and March 1995.

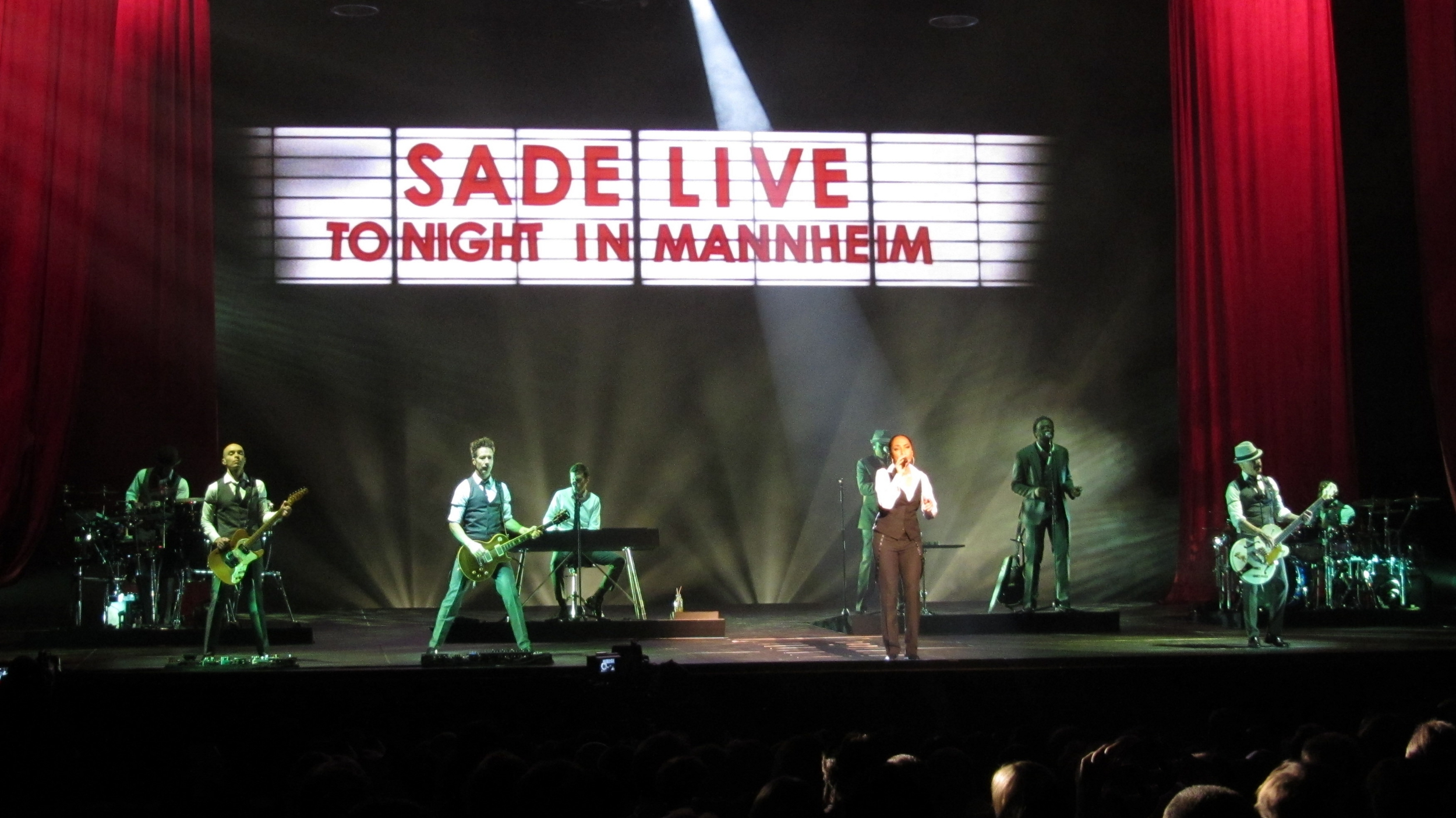
Soul band Sade spent two weeks at number one on the UK Jazz & Blues Albums Chart in 1995 with their third album, Stronger Than Pride.

Issue date	Album	Artist(s)	Record label(s)	Ref.
1 January	We Have All the Time in the World	Louis Armstrong	EMI	
8 January	We Have All the Time in the World	Louis Armstrong	EMI	
15 January	We Have All the Time in the World	Louis Armstrong	EMI	
22 January	We Have All the Time in the World	Louis Armstrong	EMI	
29 January	We Have All the Time in the World	Louis Armstrong	EMI	
5 February	We Have All the Time in the World	Louis Armstrong	EMI	
12 February	We Have All the Time in the World	Louis Armstrong	EMI	
19 February	The Lost Recordings	Glenn Miller	Happy Days	
26 February	Chill Out	John Lee Hooker	Virgin	
5 March	Chill Out	John Lee Hooker	Virgin	
12 March	Chill Out	John Lee Hooker	Virgin	
19 March	The Lost Recordings	Glenn Miller	Happy Days	
26 March	The Lost Recordings	Glenn Miller	Happy Days	
2 April	The Lost Recordings	Glenn Miller	Happy Days	
9 April	In the Mood	Glenn Miller Orchestra	Start	
16 April	Ballads & Blues 1982–1994	Gary Moore	Virgin	
23 April	Ballads & Blues 1982–1994	Gary Moore	Virgin	
30 April	Ballads & Blues 1982–1994	Gary Moore	Virgin	
7 May	The Lost Recordings	Glenn Miller	Happy Days	
14 May	Some Rainy Morning	Robert Cray	Mercury	
21 May	The Lost Recordings	Glenn Miller	Happy Days	
28 May	The Lost Recordings	Glenn Miller	Happy Days	
4 June	Blues for Greeny	Gary Moore	Virgin	
11 June	Blues for Greeny	Gary Moore	Virgin	
18 June	Blues for Greeny	Gary Moore	Virgin	
25 June	Mundo Latino	various artists	Columbia	
2 July	Mundo Latino	various artists	Columbia	
9 July	The Blues Album	various artists	Virgin	
16 July	The Blues Album	various artists	Virgin	
23 July	Mundo Latino	various artists	Columbia	
30 July	Mundo Latino	various artists	Columbia	
6 August	Mundo Latino	various artists	Columbia	
13 August	Mundo Latino	various artists	Columbia	
20 August	Mundo Latino	various artists	Columbia	
27 August	Mundo Latino	various artists	Columbia	
3 September	Jazz Moods	various artists	Telstar	
10 September	Jazz Moods	various artists	Telstar	
17 September	Songs from the Harp	Rupert Parker	Mabley Street	
24 September	Stronger Than Pride	Sade	Epic	
1 October	Stronger Than Pride	Sade	Epic	
8 October	Breathless	Kenny G	Arista	
15 October	Best of Blue Note Sampler	various artists	Blue Note	
22 October	Best of Blue Note Sampler	various artists	Blue Note	
29 October	Best of Blue Note Sampler	various artists	Blue Note	
5 November	Best of Blue Note Sampler	various artists	Blue Note	
12 November	Best of Blue Note Sampler	various artists	Blue Note	
19 November	That's Jazz	various artists	EMI	
26 November	That's Jazz	various artists	EMI	
3 December	That's Jazz	various artists	EMI	
10 December	That's Jazz	various artists	EMI	
17 December	That's Jazz	various artists	EMI	
24 December	That's Jazz	various artists	EMI	
31 December	That's Jazz	various artists	EMI	

== See also ==
- 1995 in British music
