= List of UK Jazz & Blues Albums Chart number ones of 2004 =

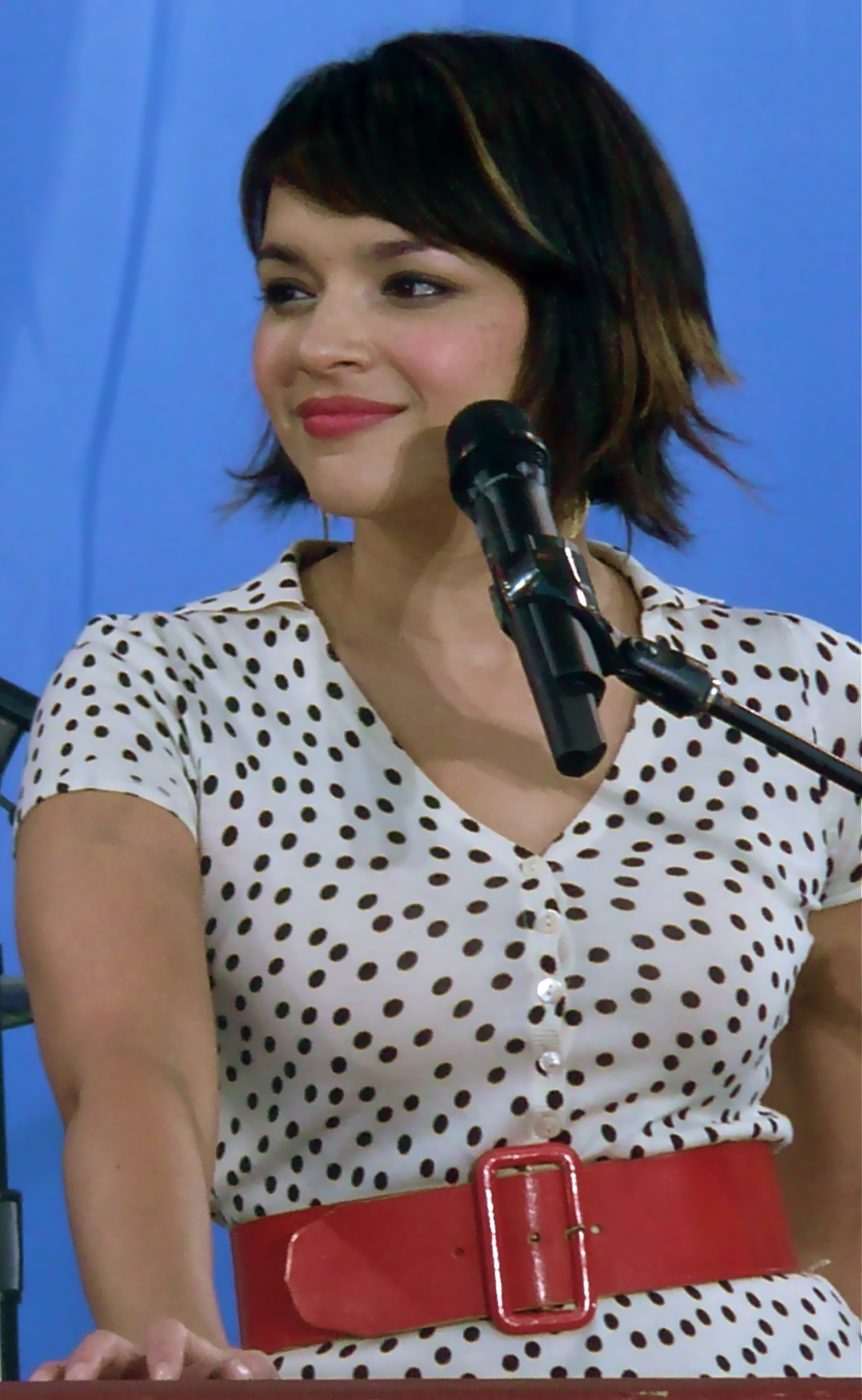
Norah Jones spent 26 weeks at number one on the UK Jazz & Blues Albums Chart in 2004 – 24 with her second album Feels Like Home and two with its predecessor, Come Away with Me.

The UK Jazz & Blues Albums Chart is a record chart which ranks the best-selling jazz and blues albums in the United Kingdom. Compiled and published by the Official Charts Company, the data is based on each album's weekly physical sales, digital downloads and streams. In 2004, 52 charts were published with ten albums at number one. Jamie Cullum's third studio album Twentysomething was both the first and last number-one album of the year, spending the first week and the last six weeks atop the chart.

The most successful album on the UK Jazz & Blues Albums Chart in 2004 was Feels Like Home, the second studio album by Norah Jones, which spent a total of 24 weeks at number one over two spells of nine and 15 weeks. Jones also spent an additional two weeks at number one with her debut album Come Away with Me in October. Jamie Cullum's Twentysomething spent seven weeks at number one, while Katie Melua's debut studio album Call Off the Search and Ray Charles' final studio album Genius Loves Company each held the number-one spot for five weeks in 2004. Call Off the Search finished 2004 as the fifth best-selling album of the year in the UK.

== Chart history ==
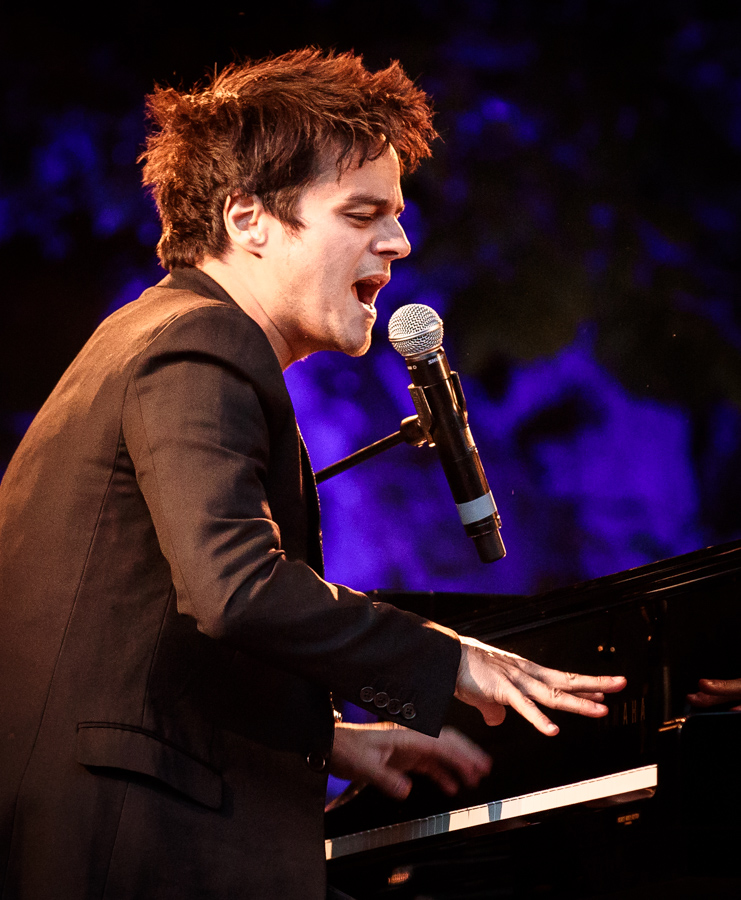
Jamie Cullum's third album Twentysomething was number one on the UK Jazz & Blues Albums Chart for the first week and the last six weeks of 2004.

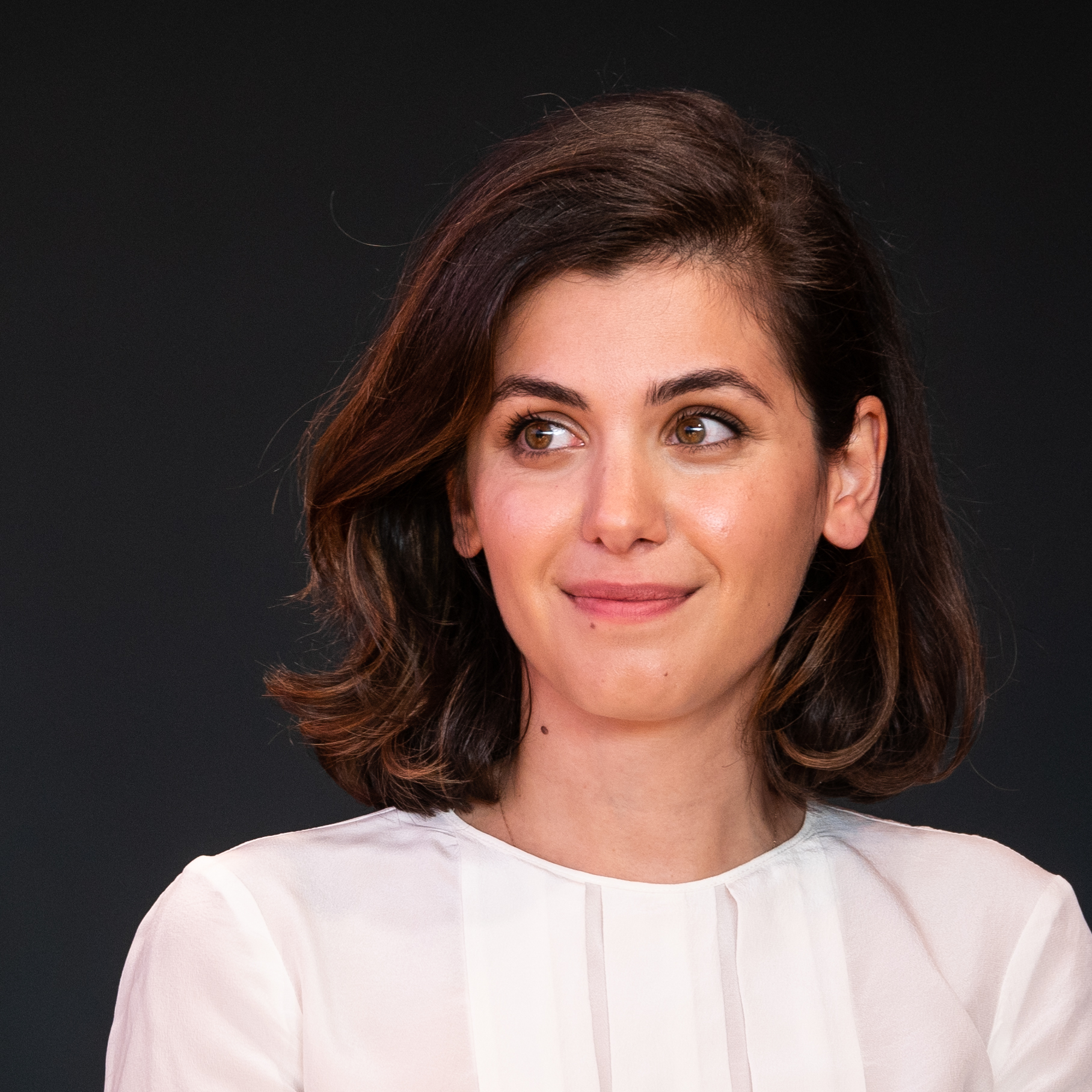
Katie Melua's debut studio album Call Off the Search spent five weeks at number one at the beginning of the year.

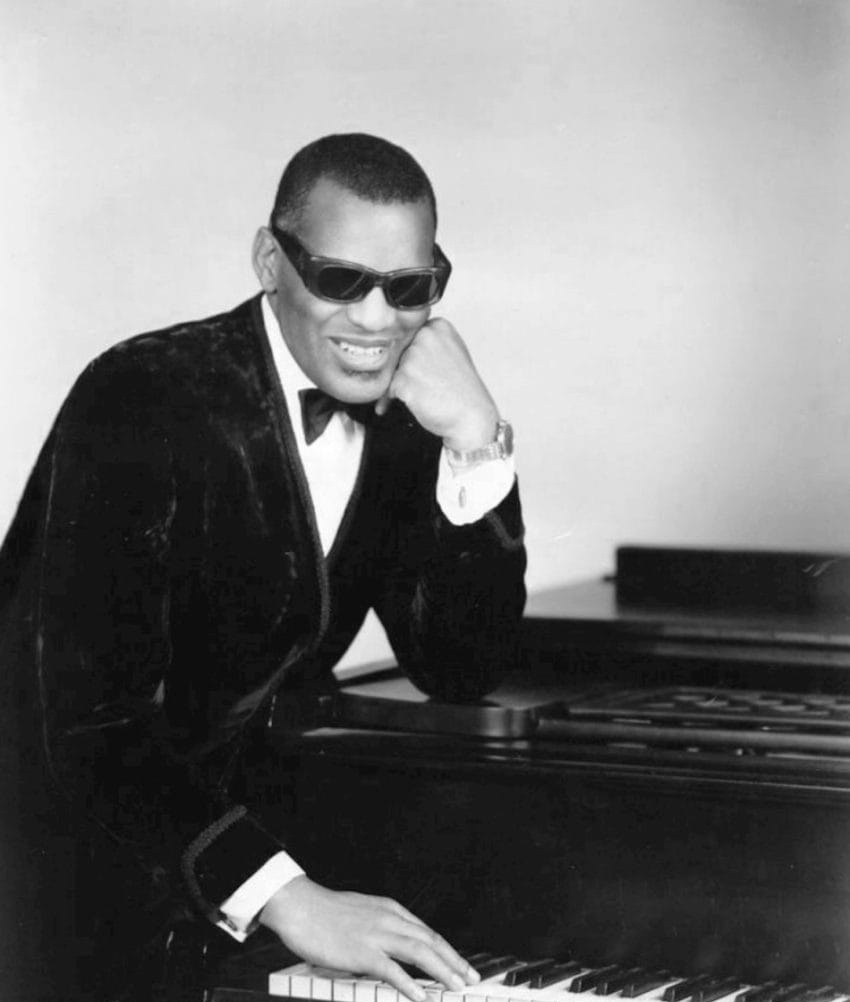
Following his death in June, Ray Charles reached number one on the UK Jazz & Blues Albums Chart with his final studio album Genius Loves Company, which was released posthumously.

Key
†	Indicates best-selling jazz/blues album of 2004

Issue date	Album	Artist(s)	Record label(s)	Ref.
4 January	Twentysomething	Jamie Cullum	UCJ	
11 January	Call Off the Search †	Katie Melua	Dramatico	
18 January	Call Off the Search †	Katie Melua	Dramatico	
25 January	Call Off the Search †	Katie Melua	Dramatico	
1 February	Call Off the Search †	Katie Melua	Dramatico	
8 February	Call Off the Search †	Katie Melua	Dramatico	
15 February	Feels Like Home	Norah Jones	Blue Note	
22 February	Feels Like Home	Norah Jones	Blue Note	
29 February	Feels Like Home	Norah Jones	Blue Note	
7 March	Feels Like Home	Norah Jones	Blue Note	
14 March	Feels Like Home	Norah Jones	Blue Note	
21 March	Feels Like Home	Norah Jones	Blue Note	
28 March	Feels Like Home	Norah Jones	Blue Note	
4 April	Feels Like Home	Norah Jones	Blue Note	
11 April	Feels Like Home	Norah Jones	Blue Note	
18 April	The Girl in the Other Room	Diana Krall	Verve	
25 April	Feels Like Home	Norah Jones	Blue Note	
2 May	Feels Like Home	Norah Jones	Blue Note	
9 May	Feels Like Home	Norah Jones	Blue Note	
16 May	Feels Like Home	Norah Jones	Blue Note	
23 May	Feels Like Home	Norah Jones	Blue Note	
30 May	Feels Like Home	Norah Jones	Blue Note	
6 June	Feels Like Home	Norah Jones	Blue Note	
13 June	Feels Like Home	Norah Jones	Blue Note	
20 June	Feels Like Home	Norah Jones	Blue Note	
27 June	Feels Like Home	Norah Jones	Blue Note	
4 July	Feels Like Home	Norah Jones	Blue Note	
11 July	Feels Like Home	Norah Jones	Blue Note	
18 July	Feels Like Home	Norah Jones	Blue Note	
25 July	Feels Like Home	Norah Jones	Blue Note	
1 August	Feels Like Home	Norah Jones	Blue Note	
8 August	Songbird: The Ultimate Collection	Kenny G	Arista	
15 August	Songbird: The Ultimate Collection	Kenny G	Arista	
22 August	The Number One Swing Album 2004	various artists	Virgin/EMI/UCJ	
29 August	The Number One Swing Album 2004	various artists	Virgin/EMI/UCJ	
5 September	Genius Loves Company	Ray Charles	Liberty	
12 September	Genius Loves Company	Ray Charles	Liberty	
19 September	Genius Loves Company	Ray Charles	Liberty	
26 September	Genius Loves Company	Ray Charles	Liberty	
3 October	Genius Loves Company	Ray Charles	Liberty	
10 October	Come Away with Me	Norah Jones	Parlophone	
17 October	Come Away with Me	Norah Jones	Parlophone	
24 October	Don't Talk	Clare Teal	Columbia	
31 October	Don't Talk	Clare Teal	Columbia	
7 November	Don't Talk	Clare Teal	Columbia	
14 November	Michael Bublé	Michael Bublé	Reprise	
21 November	Twentysomething	Jamie Cullum	UCJ	
28 November	Twentysomething	Jamie Cullum	UCJ	
5 December	Twentysomething	Jamie Cullum	UCJ	
12 December	Twentysomething	Jamie Cullum	UCJ	
19 December	Twentysomething	Jamie Cullum	UCJ	
26 December	Twentysomething	Jamie Cullum	UCJ	

== See also ==
- 2004 in British music
