= List of UK Dance Singles Chart number ones of 1994 =

These are the Official Charts Company UK Dance Singles Chart number one hits of 1994. The archive on the Official Charts Company website lists the top 40 dance singles from 3 July 1994, the beginning of the first charting week. The dates listed in the menus below represent the Saturday after the Sunday the chart was announced, as per the way the dates are given in chart publications such as the ones produced by Billboard.

Issue date	Song	Artist
9 July	"Everybody Gonfi-Gon"	Two Cowboys
16 July	"Feenin'"	Jodeci
23 July	"U Girls"	Nush
30 July	"Rock 2 House/Hip Housin'"	X-Press 2 featuring Lo-Pro
6 August	"Girls + Boys"	Hed Boys
13 August	"Two Fatt Guitars"	Direckt
20 August	"Eighteen Strings"	Tinman
27 August	"On Ya Way '94"	Helicopter
3 September	"Dreamer"	Livin' Joy
10 September	"Dreamer"	Livin' Joy
17 September	"Kickin' in the Beat"	Pamela Fernandez
24 September	"Break 4 Love"	Raze
1 October	"Get Off Your High Horse"	Rollo Goes Camping
8 October	"All Over Me"	Suzi Carr
15 October	"Cantgetaman, Cantgetajob (Life's a Bitch)"	Sister Bliss
22 October	"La Luna"	Movin Melodies Production
29 October	"Hot Dog"	Key Aura
5 November	"Dred Bass"	Dead Dred
12 November	"Melody of Love (Wanna Be Loved)"	Donna Summer
19 November	"Let Me Be Your Fantasy"	Baby D
26 November	"Let Me Be Your Fantasy"	Baby D
3 December	"Let Me Be Your Fantasy"	Baby D
10 December	"Happy Bizzness/Wild Luv"	Roach Motel
17 December	"I Need a Man"	Li Kwan
24 December	"U Sure Do"	Strike
31 December	"U Sure Do"	Strike

== See also ==
- 1994 in music
