= List of UK R&B Albums Chart number ones of 1994 =

The logo of the Official Charts Company, responsible for compiling all of the official music charts in the United Kingdom, including the R&B albums chart.

The UK R&B Chart is a weekly chart, first introduced in October 1994, that ranks the 40 biggest-selling singles and albums that are classified in the R&B genre in the United Kingdom. The chart is compiled by the Official Charts Company, and is based on sales of CDs, downloads, vinyl and other formats over the previous seven days.

The following are the number-one albums of 1994.

== Number-one albums ==
| Issue date | Album | Artist(s) | Record label | Ref. |
|---|---|---|---|---|
| 9 October | Songs | Luther Vandross | Epic | |
| 16 October | Music Box | Mariah Carey | Columbia | |
| 23 October | The Return of the Space Cowboy | Jamiroquai | Sony Soho Square | |
| 30 October | The Return of the Space Cowboy | Jamiroquai | Sony Soho Square | |
| 6 November | The Best of Sade | Sade | Epic | |
| 13 November | The Best of Sade | Sade | Epic | |
| 20 November | The Best of Sade | Sade | Epic | |
| 27 November | The Best of Sade | Sade | Epic | |
| 4 December | Always & Forever | Eternal | EMI | |
| 11 December | Always & Forever | Eternal | EMI | |
| 18 December | Always & Forever | Eternal | EMI | |
| 25 December | Always & Forever | Eternal | EMI | |

== See also ==
- List of UK Albums Chart number ones of 1994
