= List of UK Country Albums Chart number ones of 2011 =

These are the Official Charts Company's UK Country Albums Chart number ones of 2011. The chart week runs from Friday to Thursday with the chart-date given as the following Thursday. Chart positions are based the multi-metric consumption of country music in the United Kingdom, blending traditional album sales, track equivalent albums, and streaming equivalent albums. The chart contains 20 positions.

In the iteration of the chart dated 2 January, Mary Chapin Carpenter's The Age of Miracles spent its fifth week at number one, retaining its position from the final year of 2010. The album would hold at the top spot for the first four weeks of the year before being displaced by 34 Number Ones, a compilation album by country legend Alan Jackson. After a second week at number one, the album was overtaken by Sugarland's The Incredible Machine, which spent a total of five nonconsecutive weeks at the chart peak. On 26 February, Need You Now by Lady Antebellum spent its twenty-sixth total week at number one. The band's following album, Own the Night later spent thirteen consecutive weeks at number one after debuting on the chart on 9 October. Paper Airplane by bluegrass star Alison Krauss and her band Union Station spent two initial weeks at the chart summit in April immediately after its release, and would return to number one several times throughout the year, occupying the top spot for a total of fourteen weeks. Beginning on 4 September, Dolly Parton's Better Day held at number one for five weeks. The only others artists to spend multiple weeks at number one in 2011 were Josh T. Pearson and his album Last of the Country Gentlemen, which spent two consecutive weeks, and Neil Young's live album A Treasure, which remained for three weeks. The final number one of the year was Own the Night by Lady Antebellum.

== Chart history ==
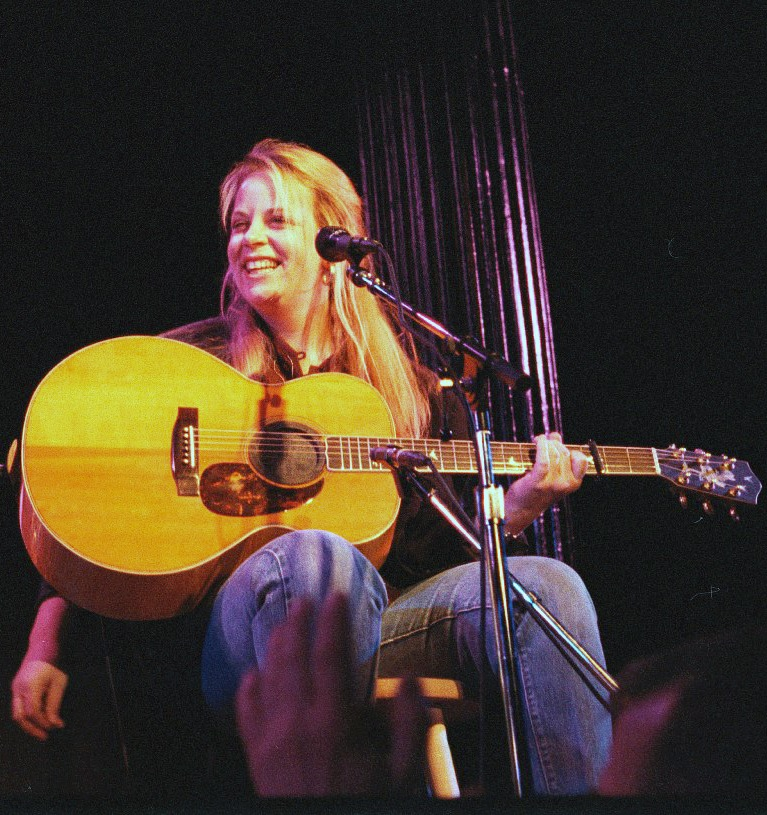
Mary Chapin Carpenter earned her third UK number one with The Age of Miracles.

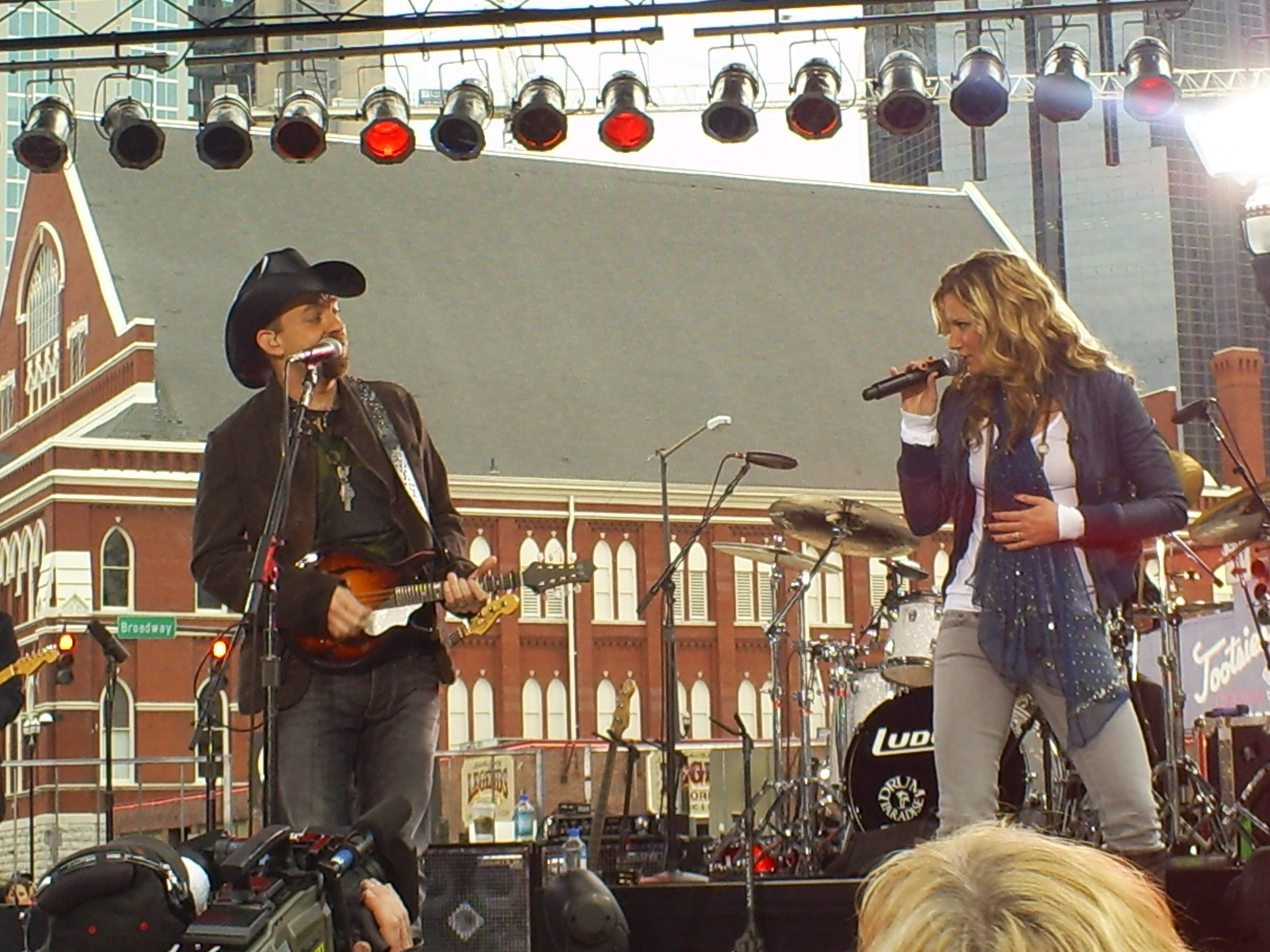
Sugarland's The Incredible Machine was number one for five weeks.

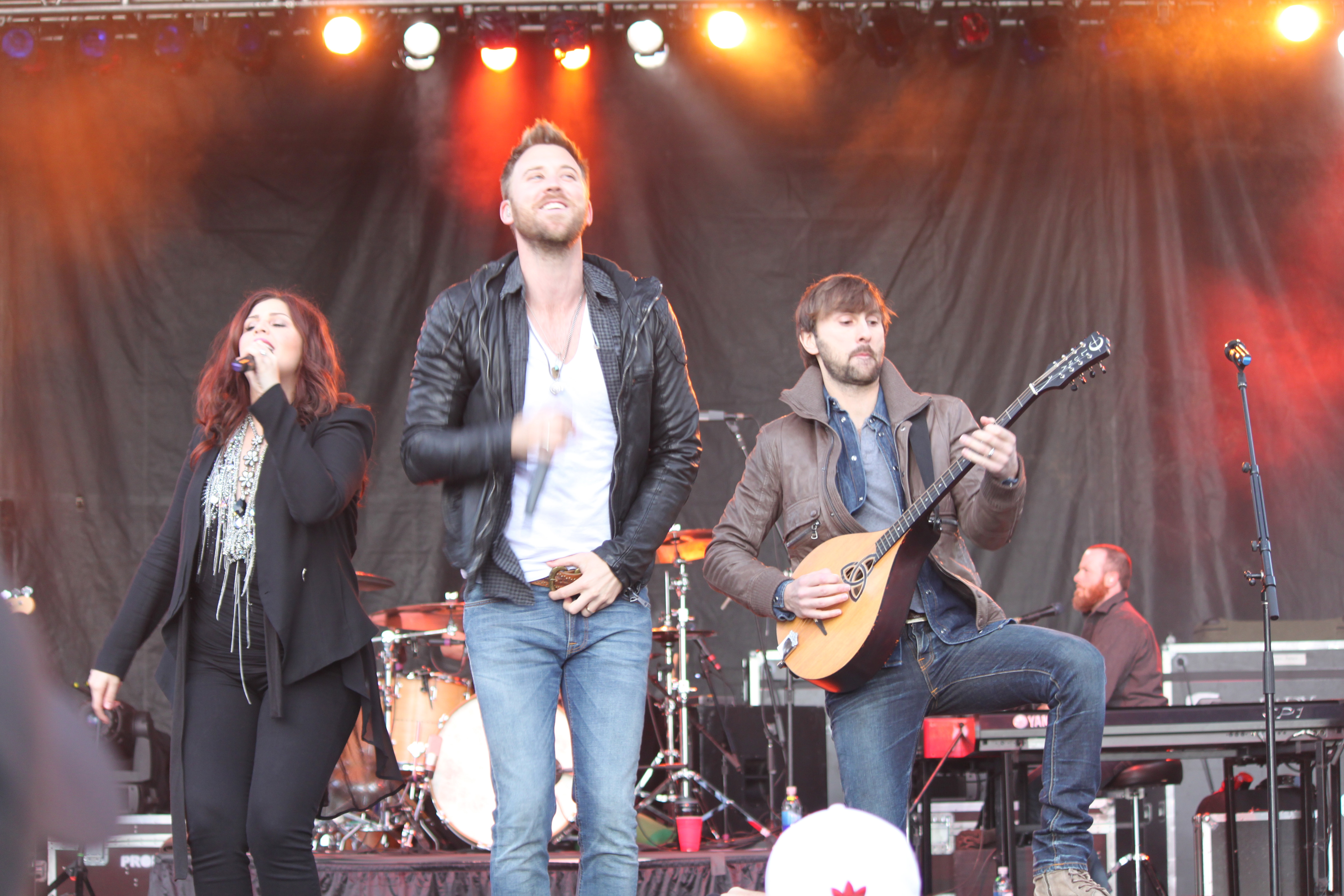
Lady Antebellum spent thirteen weeks at number one with their two albums Need You Now and Own the Night.

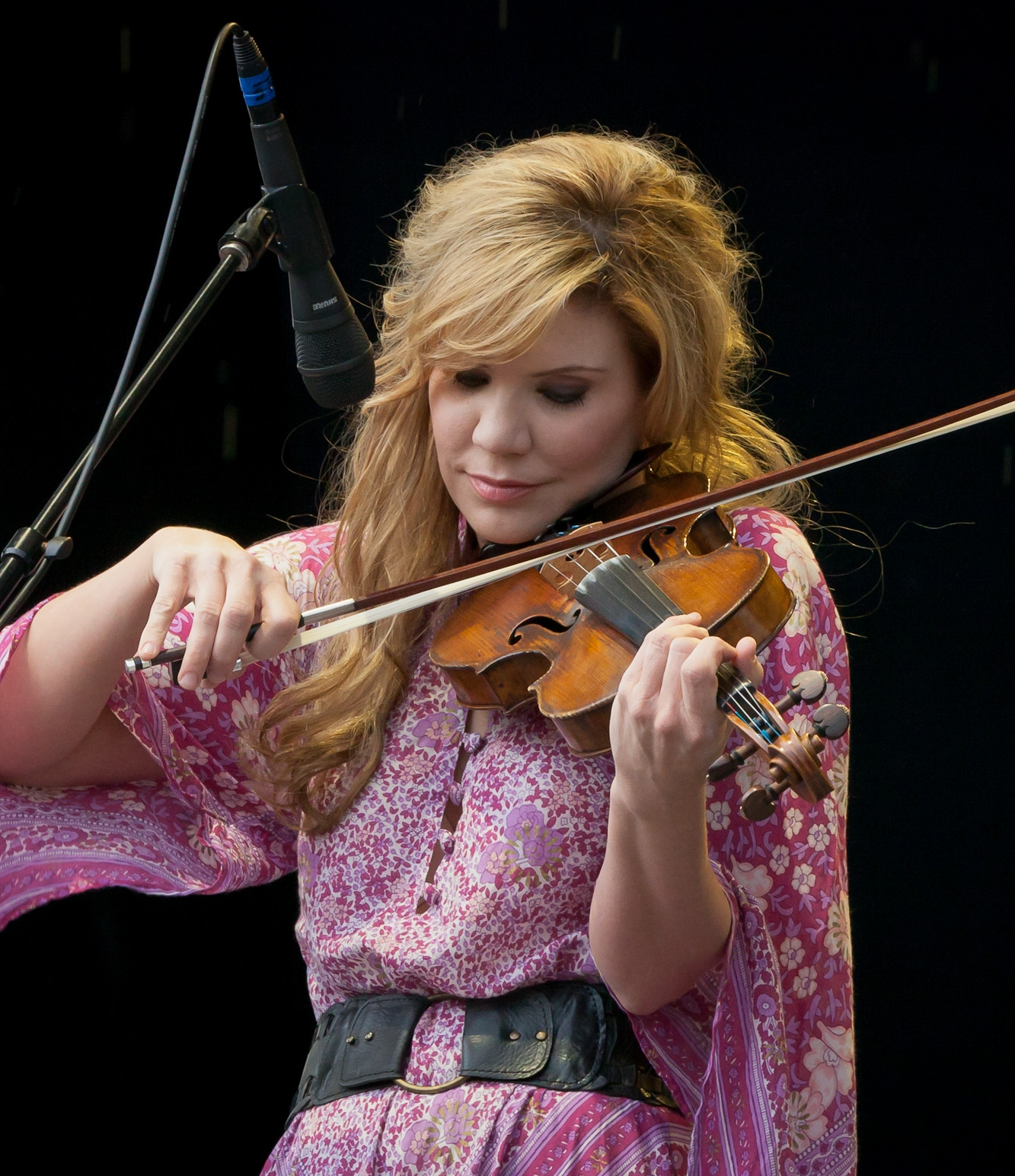
Alison Krauss & Union Station spent a leading fourteen weeks at the chart summit with Paper Airplane.

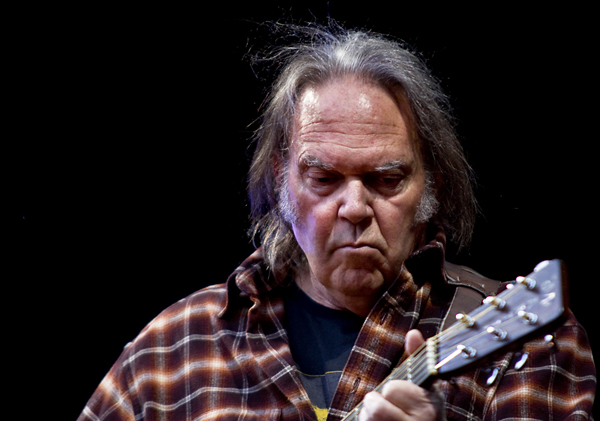
A Treasure by Neil Young was number one for three weeks.

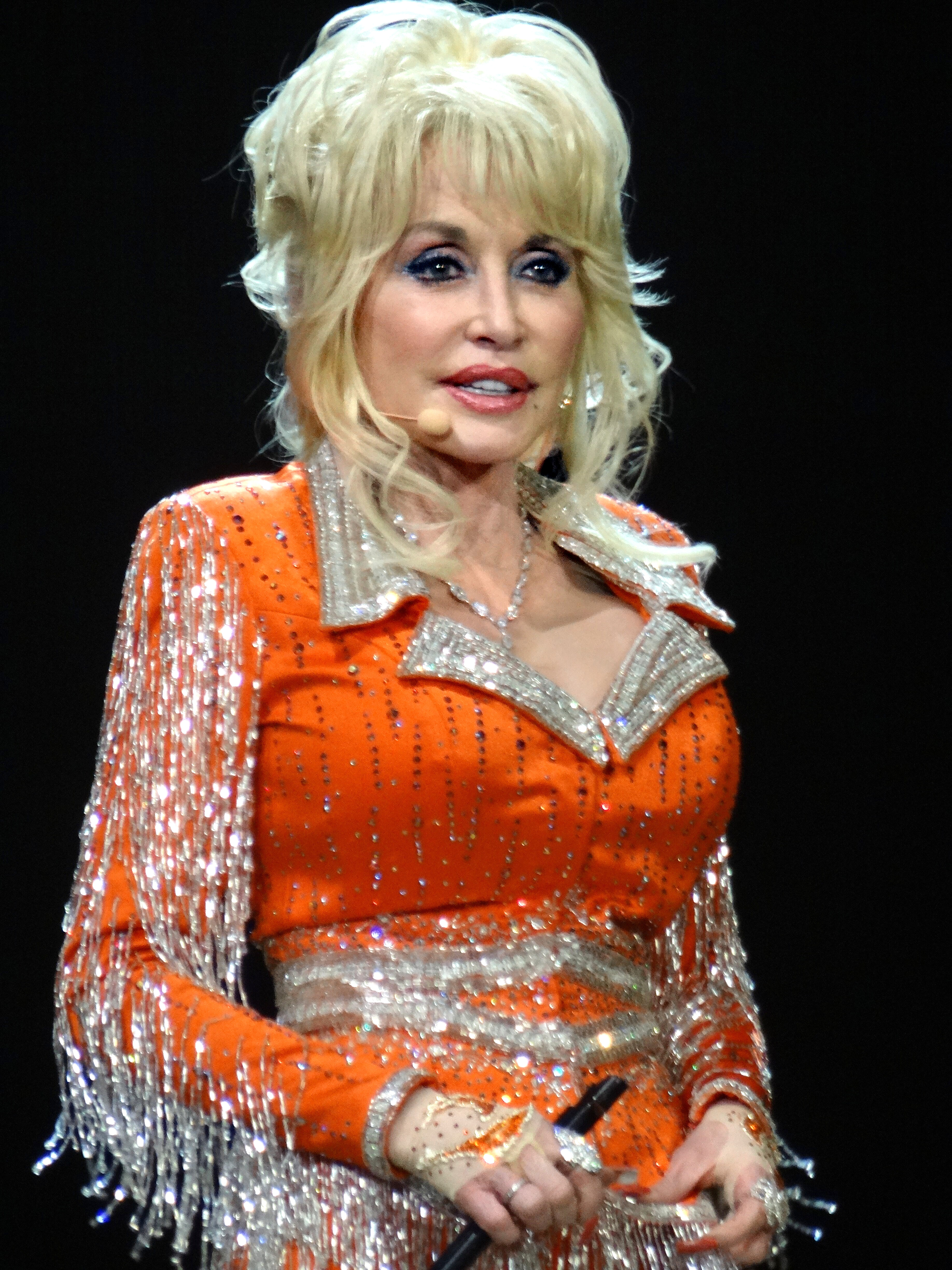
Dolly Parton's Better Day spent five consecutive weeks at the top spot.

Issue date	Album	Artist(s)	Record label	Ref.
2 January	The Age of Miracles	Mary Chapin Carpenter	Decca/Rounder	
9 January	The Age of Miracles	Mary Chapin Carpenter	Decca/Rounder	
16 January	The Age of Miracles	Mary Chapin Carpenter	Decca/Rounder	
23 January	The Age of Miracles	Mary Chapin Carpenter	Decca/Rounder	
30 January	34 Number Ones	Alan Jackson	Sony	
6 February	34 Number Ones	Alan Jackson	Sony	
13 February	The Incredible Machine	Sugarland	Decca	
20 February	The Incredible Machine	Sugarland	Decca	
27 February	Need You Now	Lady Antebellum	Capitol	
6 March	The Incredible Machine	Sugarland	Decca	
13 March	Low Country Blues	Gregg Allman	Rounder	
20 March	Last of the Country Gentlemen	Josh T. Pearson	Mute	
27 March	Last of the Country Gentlemen	Josh T. Pearson	Mute	
3 April	The Incredible Machine	Sugarland	Decca	
10 April	The Incredible Machine	Sugarland	Decca	
17 April	Paper Airplane	Alison Krauss & Union Station	Rounder	
24 April	Paper Airplane	Alison Krauss & Union Station	Rounder	
1 May	I'll Never Get Out of This World Alive	Steve Earle	New West	
8 May	Paper Airplane	Alison Krauss & Union Station	Rounder	
15 May	Paper Airplane	Alison Krauss & Union Station	Rounder	
22 May	Paper Airplane	Alison Krauss & Union Station	Rounder	
29 May	Paper Airplane	Alison Krauss & Union Station	Rounder	
5 June	Paper Airplane	Alison Krauss & Union Station	Rounder	
12 June	Paper Airplane	Alison Krauss & Union Station	Rounder	
19 June	A Treasure	Neil Young	Reprise	
26 June	A Treasure	Neil Young	Reprise	
3 July	A Treasure	Neil Young	Reprise	
10 July	Rare Bird Alert	Steve Martin & Steep Canyon Rangers	Rounder	
17 July	Paper Airplane	Alison Krauss & Union Station	Rounder	
24 July	Paper Airplane	Alison Krauss & Union Station	Rounder	
31 July	Paper Airplane	Alison Krauss & Union Station	Rounder	
7 August	Paper Airplane	Alison Krauss & Union Station	Rounder	
14 August	Paper Airplane	Alison Krauss & Union Station	Rounder	
21 August	Charleston, SC 1966	Darius Rucker	Humphead	
28 August	Paper Airplane	Alison Krauss & Union Station	Rounder	
4 September	Better Day	Dolly Parton	Sony	
11 September	Better Day	Dolly Parton	Sony	
18 September	Better Day	Dolly Parton	Sony	
25 September	Better Day	Dolly Parton	Sony	
2 October	Better Day	Dolly Parton	Sony	
9 October	Own the Night	Lady Antebellum	Capitol	
16 October	Own the Night	Lady Antebellum	Capitol	
23 October	Own the Night	Lady Antebellum	Capitol	
30 October	Own the Night	Lady Antebellum	Capitol	
6 November	Own the Night	Lady Antebellum	Capitol	
13 November	Own the Night	Lady Antebellum	Capitol	
20 November	Own the Night	Lady Antebellum	Capitol	
27 November	Own the Night	Lady Antebellum	Capitol	
4 December	Own the Night	Lady Antebellum	Capitol	
11 December	Own the Night	Lady Antebellum	Capitol	
18 December	Own the Night	Lady Antebellum	Capitol	
25 December	Own the Night	Lady Antebellum	Capitol	

== Most weeks at number one ==
Weeks at number one	Artist
14	Alison Krauss & Union Station
13	Lady Antebellum
5	Dolly Parton
5	Sugarland
4	Mary Chapin Carpenter
3	Neil Young
2	Alan Jackson
2	Josh T. Pearson

== See also ==
- List of UK Albums Chart number ones of 2011
- List of UK Dance Singles Chart number ones of 2011
- List of UK Album Downloads Chart number ones of 2011
- List of UK Independent Albums Chart number ones of 2011
- List of UK R&B Albums Chart number ones of 2011
- List of UK Rock & Metal Albums Chart number ones of 2011
- List of UK Compilation Chart number ones of the 2010s
