= List of UK Independent Albums Chart number ones of 2011 =

These are the Official Charts Company's UK Indie Chart number-one albums of 2011.

Singer Adele is by far and far away the most successful artist of 2011 on the chart, spending 46 weeks atop the chart, out of 52 weeks, with her two albums, 19 topped the first four weeks on the chart, and then 21 topped for another forty-two non-consecutive weeks, leading it as the best selling Indie album of the year, and making 21 as the longest-running album at the top spot on the chart since it has started.

== Chart history ==
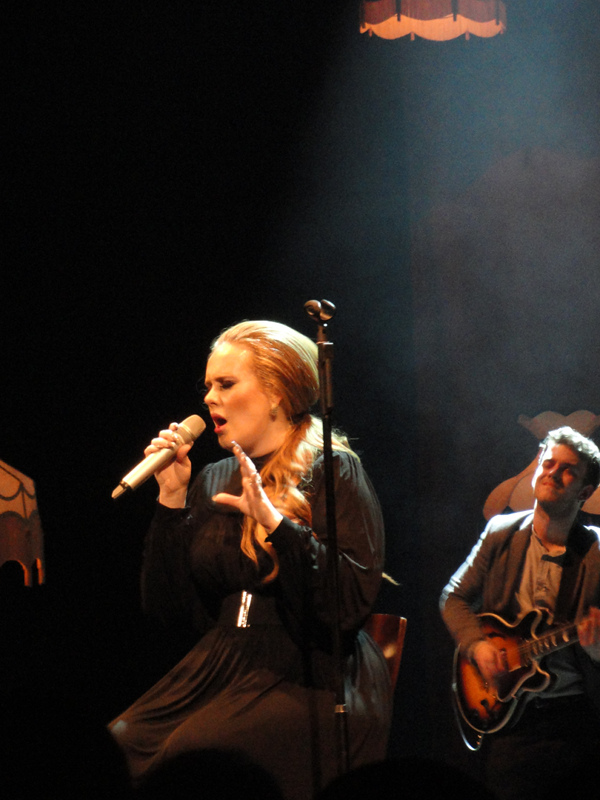
Adele topped the indie chart for 46 weeks this year.

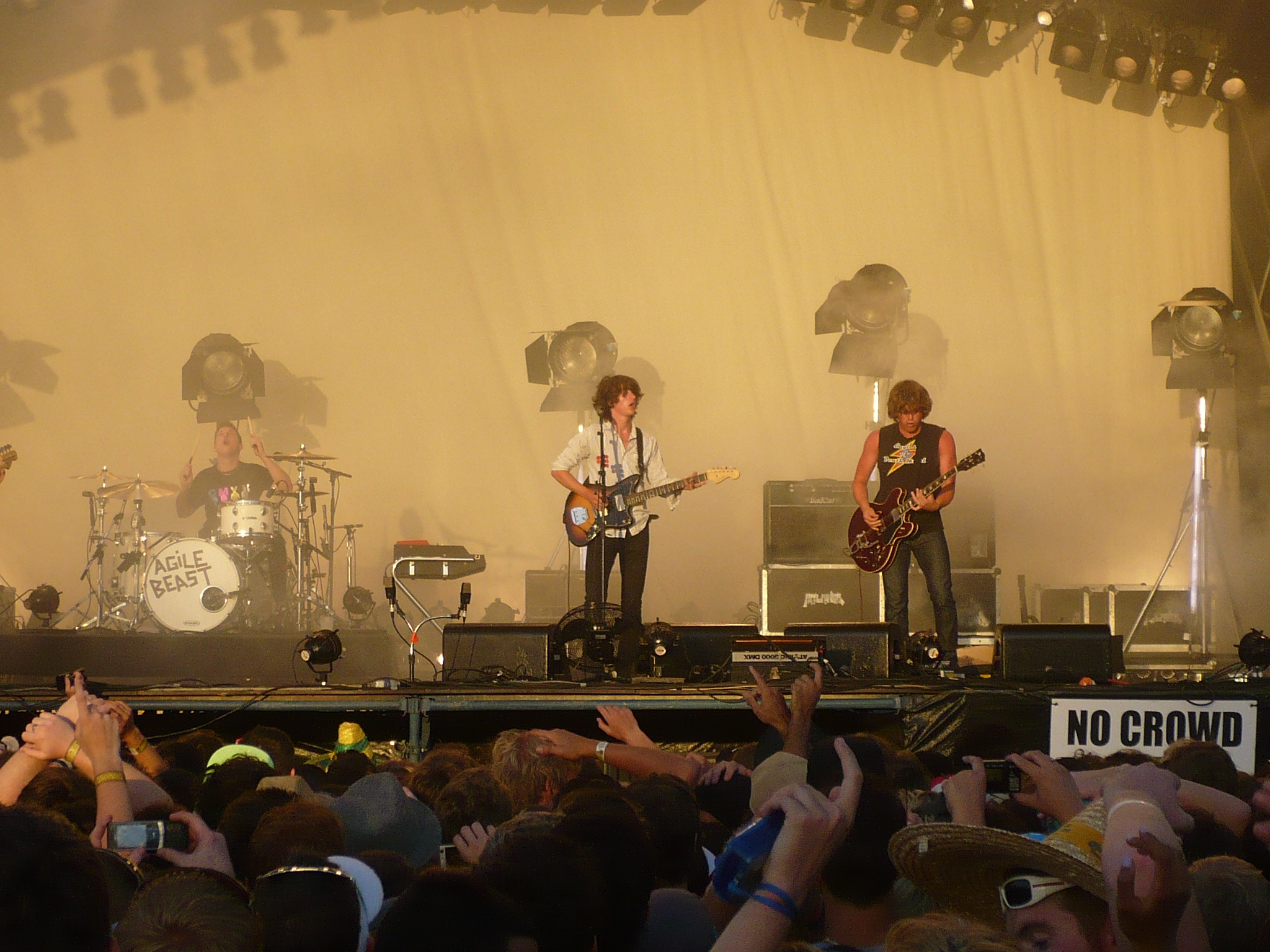
Arctic Monkeys spent a week at number one with Suck It and See.

Example reached the top of the UK Indie Chart with Playing in the Shadows.

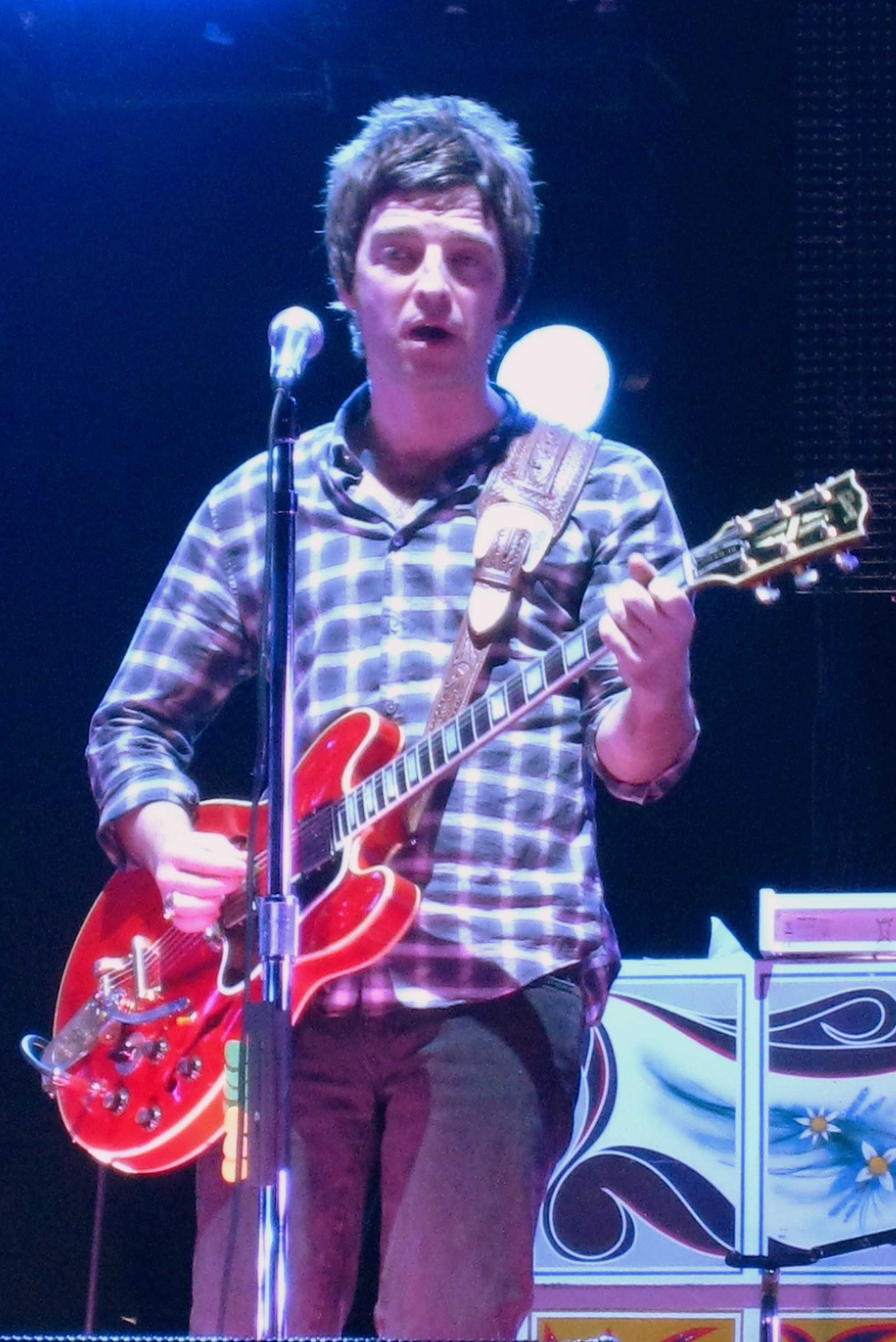
Noel Gallagher topped the chart with his new band Noel Gallagher's High Flying Birds.

Key
†	Best-selling indie album of the year

Issue date	Album	Artist(s)	Record label	Ref.
2 January	19	Adele	XL	
9 January	19	Adele	XL	
16 January	19	Adele	XL	
23 January	19	Adele	XL	
30 January	21 †	Adele	XL	
6 February	21 †	Adele	XL	
13 February	21 †	Adele	XL	
20 February	21 †	Adele	XL	
27 February	21 †	Adele	XL	
6 March	21 †	Adele	XL	
13 March	21 †	Adele	XL	
20 March	21 †	Adele	XL	
27 March	21 †	Adele	XL	
3 April	21 †	Adele	XL	
10 April	21 †	Adele	XL	
17 April	21 †	Adele	XL	
24 April	21 †	Adele	XL	
1 May	21 †	Adele	XL	
8 May	21 †	Adele	XL	
15 May	21 †	Adele	XL	
22 May	21 †	Adele	XL	
29 May	21 †	Adele	XL	
5 June	21 †	Adele	XL	
12 June	Suck It and See	Arctic Monkeys	Domino	
19 June	21 †	Adele	XL	
26 June	21 †	Adele	XL	
3 July	21 †	Adele	XL	
10 July	21 †	Adele	XL	
17 July	21 †	Adele	XL	
24 July	21 †	Adele	XL	
31 July	21 †	Adele	XL	
7 August	21 †	Adele	XL	
14 August	21 †	Adele	XL	
21 August	21 †	Adele	XL	
28 August	21 †	Adele	XL	
4 September	21 †	Adele	XL	
11 September	Playing in the Shadows	Example	Ministry of Sound	
18 September	21 †	Adele	XL	
25 September	21 †	Adele	XL	
2 October	21 †	Adele	XL	
9 October	21 †	Adele	XL	
16 October	21 †	Adele	XL	
23 October	Noel Gallagher's High Flying Birds	Noel Gallagher's High Flying Birds	Sour Mash	
30 October	Noel Gallagher's High Flying Birds	Noel Gallagher's High Flying Birds	Sour Mash	
6 November	Noel Gallagher's High Flying Birds	Noel Gallagher's High Flying Birds	Sour Mash	
13 November	Noel Gallagher's High Flying Birds	Noel Gallagher's High Flying Birds	Sour Mash	
20 November	21 †	Adele	XL	
27 November	21 †	Adele	XL	
4 December	21 †	Adele	XL	
11 December	21 †	Adele	XL	
18 December	21 †	Adele	XL	
25 December	21 †	Adele	XL	

== See also ==
- List of UK Albums Chart number ones of the 2010s
- List of UK Dance Albums Chart number ones of 2011
- List of UK Album Downloads Chart number ones of the 2010s
- List of UK Independent Singles Chart number ones of 2011
- List of UK R&B Albums Chart number ones of 2011
