= List of UK Dance Albums Chart number ones of 2011 =

These are the Official Charts Company's UK Dance Chart number-one albums of 2011. The dates listed in the menus below represent the Saturday after the Sunday the chart was announced, as per the way the dates are given in chart publications such as the ones produced by Billboard, Guinness, and Virgin.

== Chart history ==
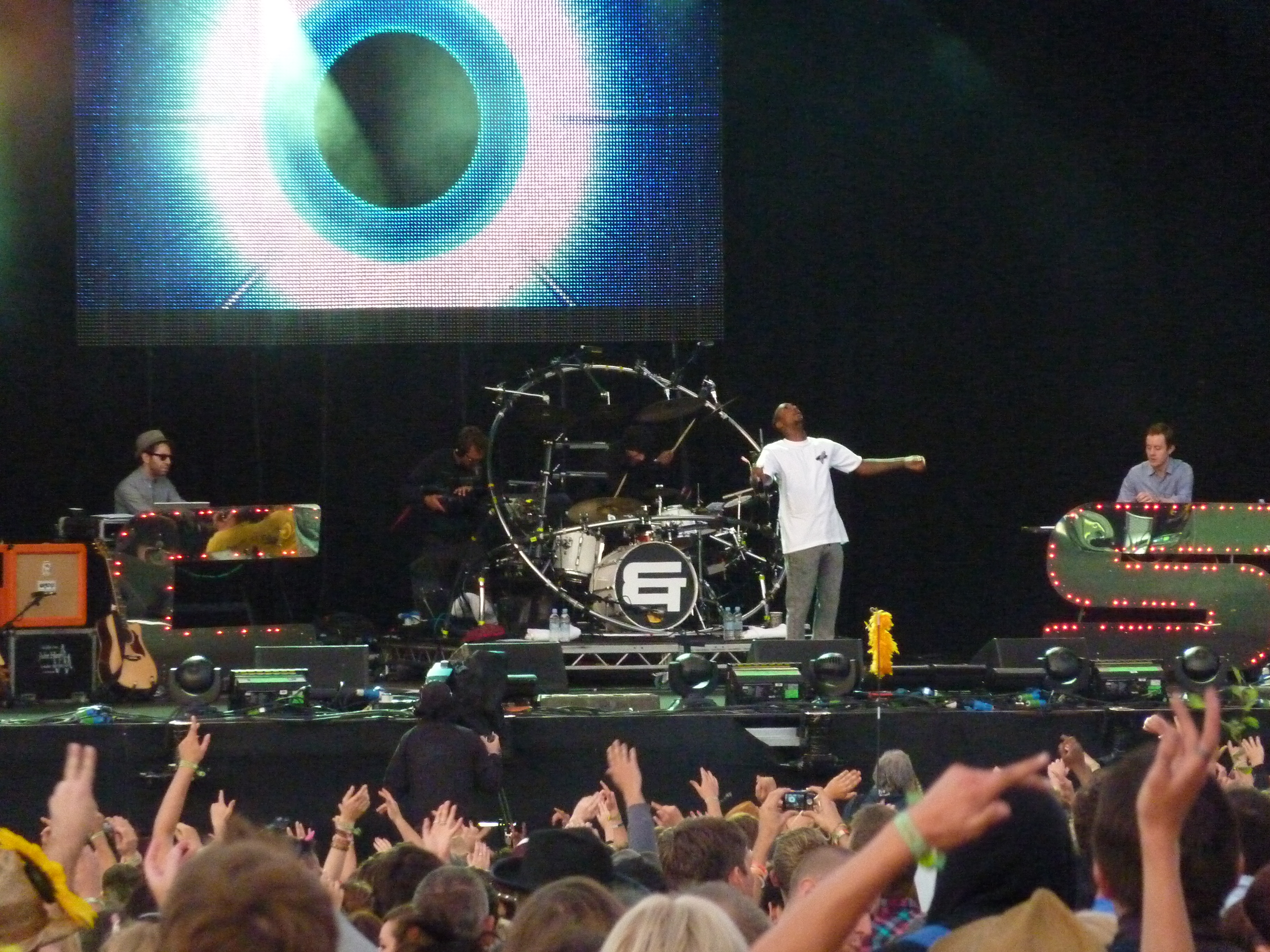
Chase & Status reached number one with No More Idols.

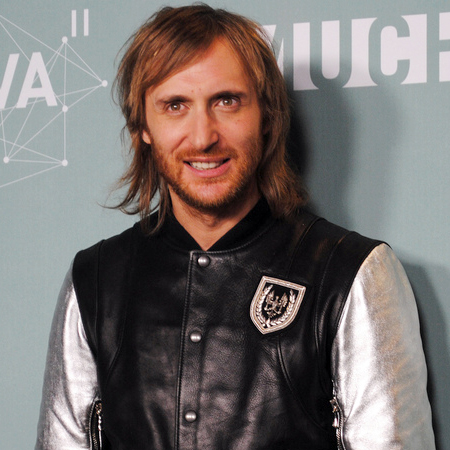
David Guetta topped the dance chart with two albums during 2011.

Example reached the top of the UK Dance Chart with Playing in the Shadows.

Issue date	Album	Artist(s)	Record label	Ref.
1 January	Tron: Legacy	Daft Punk	Walt Disney	
8 January	The Beginning	The Black Eyed Peas	Interscope	
15 January	Running Trax 2	Various artists	Ministry of Sound	
22 January	Running Trax 2	Various artists	Ministry of Sound	
29 January	Running Trax 2	Various artists	Ministry of Sound	
5 February	Cream Chilled Electronic	Various artists	One More Tune	
12 February	No More Idols	Chase & Status	Mercury	
19 February	No More Idols	Chase & Status	Mercury	
26 February	No More Idols	Chase & Status	Mercury	
5 March	No More Idols	Chase & Status	Mercury	
12 March	No More Idols	Chase & Status	Mercury	
19 March	No More Idols	Chase & Status	Mercury	
26 March	No More Idols	Chase & Status	Mercury	
2 April	No More Idols	Chase & Status	Mercury	
9 April	Back to the Old Skool	Various artists	Ministry of Sound	
16 April	On a Mission	Katy B	Rinse	
23 April	Ultimate Floorfillers	Various artists	AATW/EMI TV/UMTV	
30 April	Ultimate Floorfillers	Various artists	AATW/EMI TV/UMTV	
7 May	No More Idols	Chase & Status	Mercury	
14 May	No More Idols	Chase & Status	Mercury	
21 May	No More Idols	Chase & Status	Mercury	
28 May	No More Idols	Chase & Status	Mercury	
4 June	World's on Fire	The Prodigy	Take me to the hospital	
11 June	No More Idols	Chase & Status	Mercury	
18 June	Hot	Inna	3 Beat/AATW	
25 June	No More Idols	Chase & Status	Mercury	
2 July	No More Idols	Chase & Status	Mercury	
9 July	Clubland 19	Various artists	AATW/UMTV	
16 July	Clubland 19	Various artists	AATW/UMTV	
23 July	Running Trax 3	Various artists	Ministry of Sound	
30 July	One Love	David Guetta	Positiva/Virgin	
6 August	No More Idols	Chase & Status	Mercury	
13 August	Back to Life – 90's Soul Groove & Club	Various artists	EMI TV/UMTV	
20 August	Hed Kandi Ibiza 2011	Various artists	HedKandi	
27 August	Welcome Reality	Nero	MTA	
3 September	Welcome Reality	Nero	MTA	
10 September	Nothing but the Beat	David Guetta	Positiva/Virgin	
17 September	Playing in the Shadows	Example	Ministry of Sound	
24 September	Playing in the Shadows	Example	Ministry of Sound	
1 October	Nothing but the Beat	David Guetta	Positiva/Virgin	
8 October	Nothing but the Beat	David Guetta	Positiva/Virgin	
15 October	Nothing but the Beat	David Guetta	Positiva/Virgin	
22 October	Addicted to Bass Classics	Various artists	Ministry of Sound	
29 October	Nothing but the Beat	David Guetta	Positiva/Virgin	
5 November	Playing in the Shadows	Example	Ministry of Sound	
12 November	Playing in the Shadows	Example	Ministry of Sound	
19 November	Playing in the Shadows	Example	Ministry of Sound	
26 November	Playing in the Shadows	Example	Ministry of Sound	
3 December	Playing in the Shadows	Example	Ministry of Sound	
10 December	Xx Twenty Years	Various artists	Ministry of Sound	
17 December	Xx Twenty Years	Various artists	Ministry of Sound	
24 December	Xx Twenty Years	Various artists	Ministry of Sound	
31 December	Xx Twenty Years	Various artists	Ministry of Sound	

== See also ==
- List of UK Albums Chart number ones of the 2010s
- List of UK Dance Singles Chart number ones of 2011
- List of UK Album Downloads Chart number ones of the 2010s
- List of UK Independent Singles Chart number ones of 2011
- List of UK Independent Singles Chart number ones of 2011
- List of UK R&B Albums Chart number ones of 2011
