= List of UK R&B Singles Chart number ones of 2011 =

The UK R&B Chart is a weekly chart that ranks the biggest-selling singles that are classified in the R&B genre in the United Kingdom. The chart is compiled by the Official Charts Company, and is based on both physical and digital single sales.

== Summary ==
2011 opened with international artist Rihanna's collaboration with Young Money-member Drake, "What's My Name?" continuing its reign at the peak. Having first reached the peak on 19 December 2010 the single has spent a total of five consecutive weeks at number-one (two in 2010, the other three in 2011).

Rihanna's reign at the peak of the chart was ended when Sean Combs' latest group Diddy-Dirty Money debuted at number-one on 23 January 2011 with "Coming Home", which also featured singer-songwriter Skylar Grey. Having spent an equal number of weeks at the peak, three; the single was knocked from the peak on 13 February by British rapper Chipmunk and his collaboration with American R&B artist Chris Brown, "Champion". The single spent two weeks at the peak of the chart before being toppled by Rihanna, who claimed her second R&B number-one of 2011 with "S&M" on 27 February. After five consecutive weeks at number-one, "S&M" was knocked down to number two in favour of Jennifer Lopez and her comeback collaboration with Pitbull, "On the Floor".

After three consecutive weeks at the peak, "On the Floor" was dethroned by Wretch 32 on 24 April, with second single "Unorthodox"; a collaboration with rapper Example. The following week saw Bruno Mars climb to the top spot with third single "The Lazy Song". The appearance marked the singer's third R&B number-one single, following collaborations with B.o.B and Travie McCoy – "Nothin' On You" (2010) and "Billionaire" (2010). On its third week at the peak, the single also topped the UK Singles Chart – the fourth number-one for Mars.

Having spent five weeks at the peak, Bruno Mars was toppled from the number-one spot on 4 June by American singer Aloe Blacc with breakthrough single "I Need a Dollar". The single spent two consecutive weeks at the summit before the Tinchy Stryder and Dappy (of N-Dubz) collaboration "Spaceship" debuted at number-one on 19 June. The following week Jason Derülo claimed the number-one single, when "Don't Wanna Go Home" debuted on the chart. The single also topped the UK chart and marked Derülo's fourth number-one single on the chart – the others being "Whatcha Say" (2009), "In My Head" (2010) and "Ridin' Solo" (2010).

Spending only two weeks at the peak, Derülo was shortly replaced by Loick Essien with the breakthrough single "How We Roll", which featured guest vocals from Tanya Lacey. The following week saw R&B-legend Beyoncé claim another number-one single with "Best Thing I Never Had". The single marks the third R&B number-one single for the singer, the others being "If I Were a Boy" (2008) and "Single Ladies (Put a Ring on It)" (2009). Following two weeks at the number-one spot, Beyoncé was replaced by British boyband JLS with the Dev-assisted single "She Makes Me Wanna". The single, which also debuted at number-one on the singles chart, marks the fourth R&B number-one single for the group; with the remaining singles being: "Beat Again" (2009), "Everybody in Love" (2009) and "The Club Is Alive" (2010).

Following the three-week reign of JLS, Wretch 32 claimed a second R&B number-one single on 21 August with Josh Kumra-assisted single "Don't Go". The single, which also topped the singles chart spent two weeks at the peak before singer/songwriter Ed Sheeran claimed a first number-one single with "You Need Me, I Don't Need You". 18 September saw Sean Kingston claim his first number-one single on the year. "Party All Night (Sleep All Day)" rose to success following prominent usage in the 2011 comedy The Inbetweeners Movie which topped the Box Office. After two weeks at the summit, Kingston was dethroned by N-Dubz member-gone solo Dappy with the debut single "No Regrets". The single, which also topped the singles chart, spent three weeks at the summit; bringing Dappy's total to four weeks at the peak in 2011 alone.

On 16 October, Gym Class Heroes debuted at number-one with the Adam Levine (of Maroon 5) assisted "Stereo Hearts". The single, which spent two weeks at the summit, also reached number-three on the singles chart. The track was pushed down to number-two on 30 October when British rapper Professor Green claimed both his first number-one single and first R&B number-one single. The single "Read All About It", which featured vocals from Emeli Sandé, sold more than 153,000 copies and appears on the album, At Your Inconvenience (2011). JLS then claimed a fifth R&B number-one single in November 2011 with "Take a Chance on Me", preventing Green from achieving a third consecutive week at the summit.

20 November saw rapper Flo Rida debut at number-one with the Etta James-sampled "Good Feeling". The track, which reached number two in the singles chart, spent three consecutive weeks at the summit; marking his second number-one single after "Right Round" featuring Ke$ha (2009). The final number-one single of the year came from Lloyd and André 3000's collaborative single "Dedication to My Ex (Miss That)", also credited to narrator Lil Wayne. The single topped the charts on 11 December, also peaking at number three on the singles chart.

== Number-one singles ==
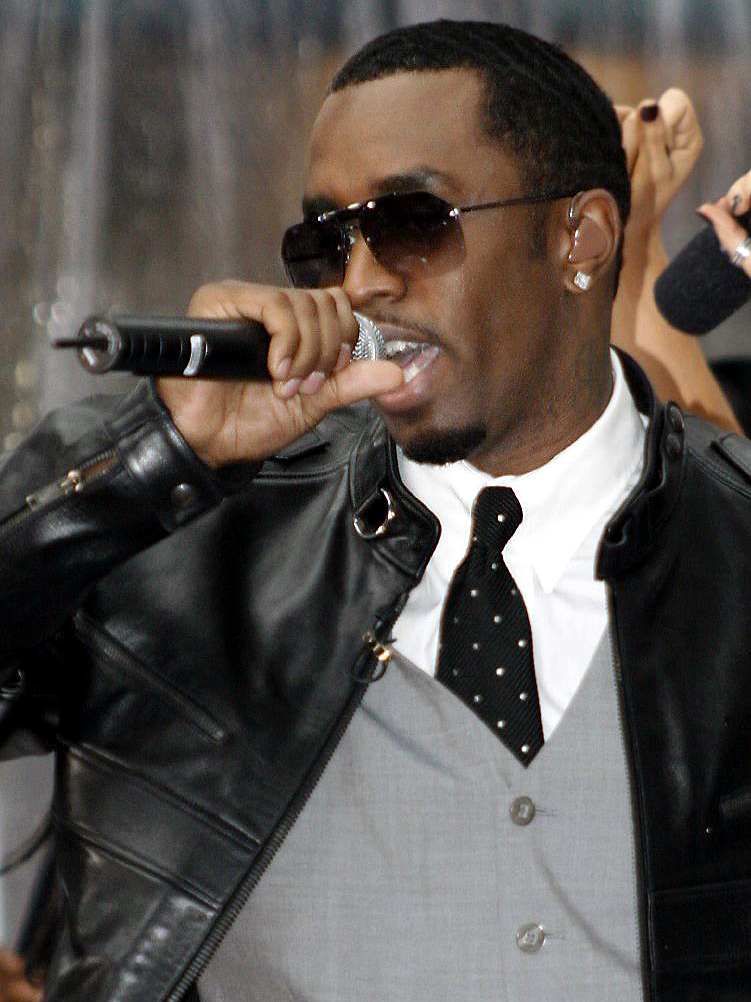
Rapper Sean Combs reached the number-one spot in January 2011 alongside group Diddy-Dirty Money with the number-four single "Coming Home" which also featured singer Skylar Grey.

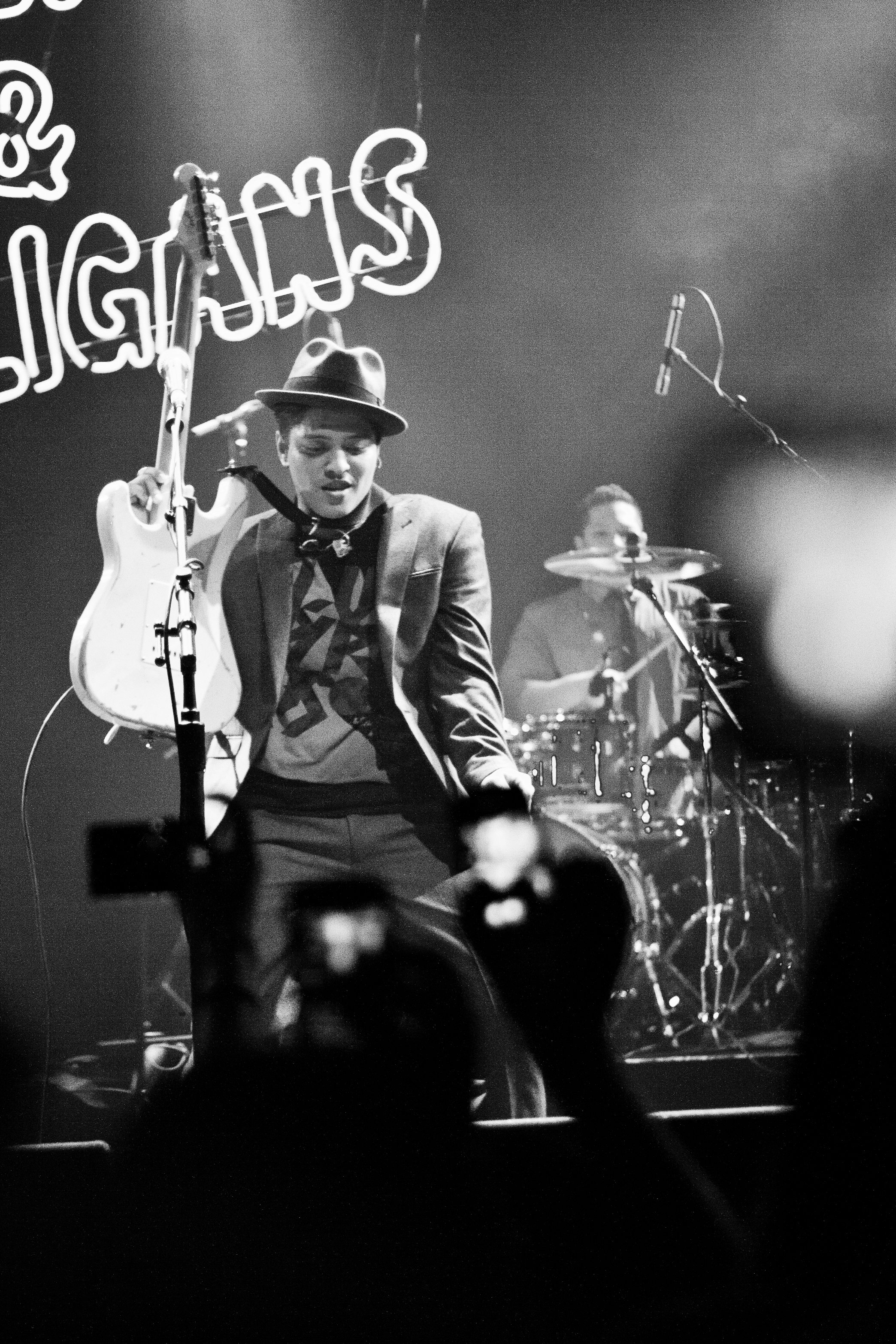
Bruno Mars spent five consecutive weeks at number-one with third single "The Lazy Song" in May 2011.

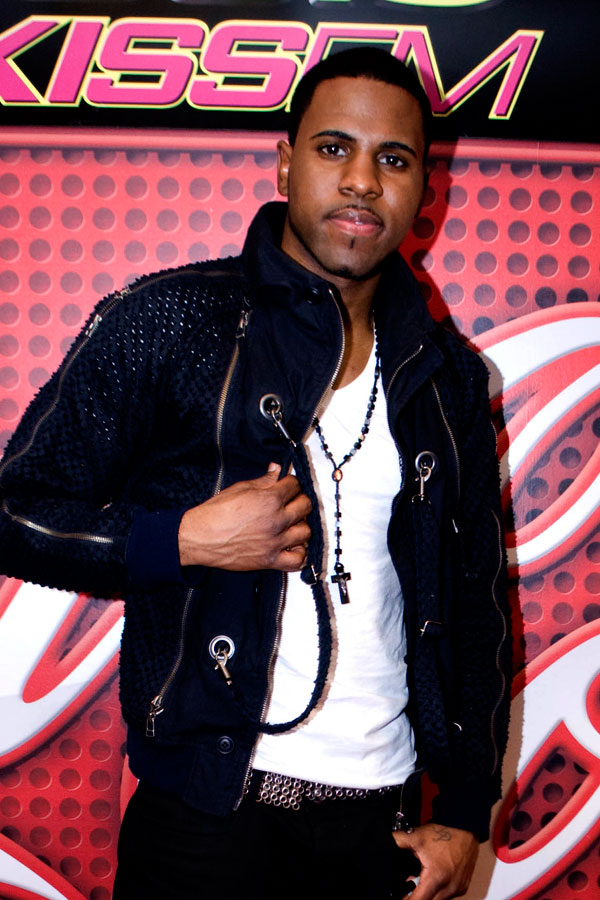
Jason Derülo scored his fourth number-one single in June 2011, when lead single from Future History, "Don't Wanna Go Home" topped both the chart and the UK Singles Chart.

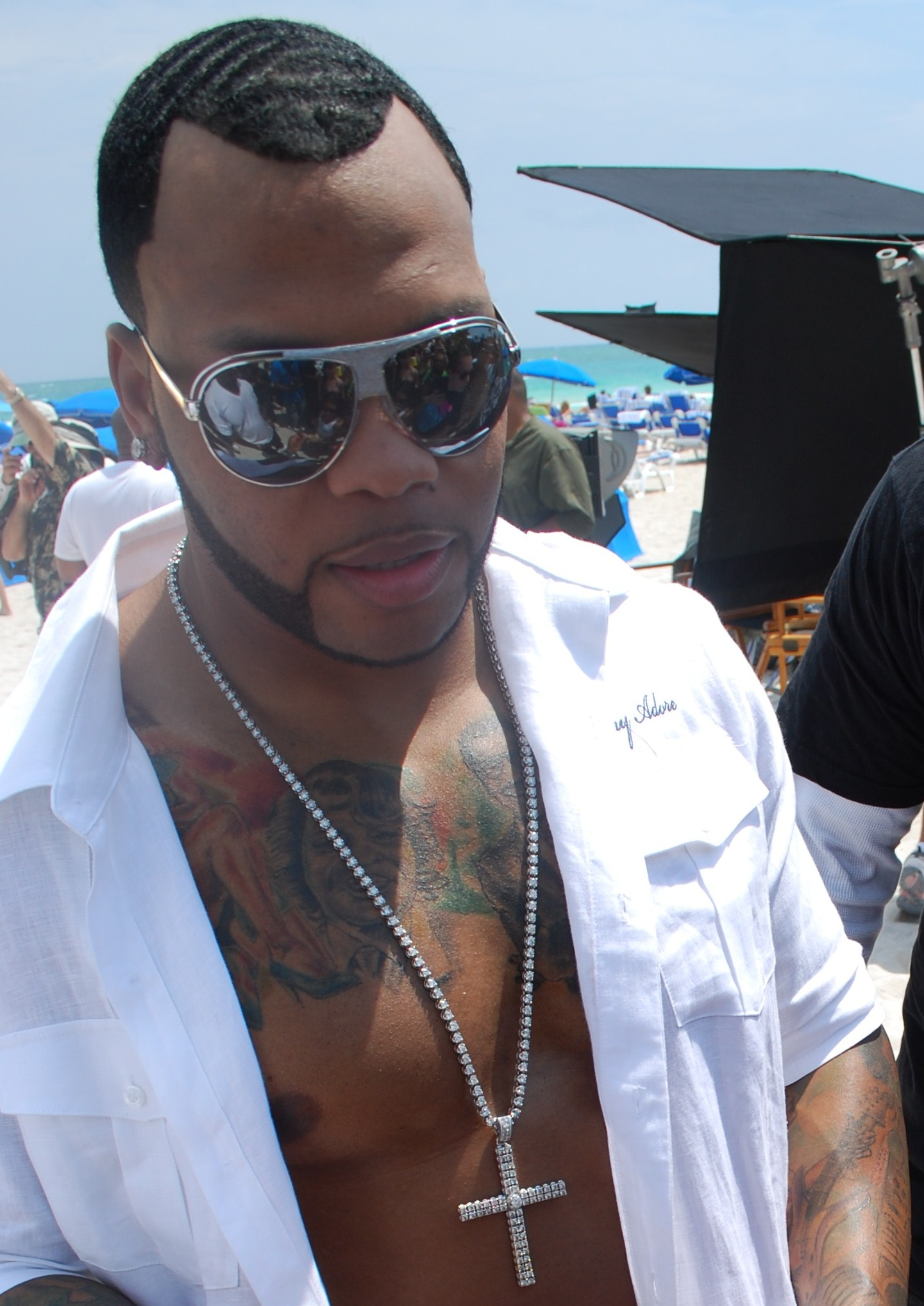
Flo Rida scored a second number-one single in November 2011 with Etta James-sampled "Good Feeling".

Key
†	Best-selling R&B single of the year

Issue date	Single	Artist	Ref.
1 January ^{[b]}	"What's My Name?"	Rihanna featuring Drake	
8 January ^{[b]}	"What's My Name?"	Rihanna featuring Drake	
15 January ^{[a]} ^{[b]}	"What's My Name?"	Rihanna featuring Drake	
22 January ^{[b]}	"What's My Name?"	Rihanna featuring Drake	
29 January	"Coming Home"	Diddy-Dirty Money featuring Skylar Grey	
5 February	"Coming Home"	Diddy-Dirty Money featuring Skylar Grey	
12 February	"Coming Home"	Diddy-Dirty Money featuring Skylar Grey	
19 February	"Champion"	Chipmunk featuring Chris Brown	
26 February	"Champion"	Chipmunk featuring Chris Brown	
5 March ^{[b]}	"S&M"	Rihanna	
12 March ^{[b]}	"S&M"	Rihanna	
19 March ^{[b]}	"S&M"	Rihanna	
26 March ^{[b]}	"S&M"	Rihanna	
2 April	"S&M"	Rihanna	
9 April ^{[a]}	"On the Floor" †	Jennifer Lopez featuring Pitbull	
16 April ^{[a]}	"On the Floor" †	Jennifer Lopez featuring Pitbull	
23 April	"On the Floor" †	Jennifer Lopez featuring Pitbull	
30 April	"Unorthodox"	Wretch 32 featuring Example	
7 May	"The Lazy Song"	Bruno Mars	
14 May	"The Lazy Song"	Bruno Mars	
21 May ^{[a]}	"The Lazy Song"	Bruno Mars	
28 May	"The Lazy Song"	Bruno Mars	
4 June	"The Lazy Song"	Bruno Mars	
11 June	"I Need A Dollar"	Aloe Blacc	
18 June	"I Need A Dollar"	Aloe Blacc	
25 June	"Spaceship"	Tinchy Stryder & Dappy	
2 July ^{[a]}	"Don't Wanna Go Home"	Jason Derülo	
9 July ^{[a]}	"Don't Wanna Go Home"	Jason Derülo	
16 July	"How We Roll"	Loick Essien featuring Tanya Lacey	
23 July ^{[b]}	"Best Thing I Never Had"	Beyoncé	
30 July ^{[b]}	"Best Thing I Never Had"	Beyoncé	
6 August ^{[a]}	"She Makes Me Wanna"	JLS featuring Dev	
13 August	"She Makes Me Wanna"	JLS featuring Dev	
20 August	"She Makes Me Wanna"	JLS featuring Dev	
27 August ^{[a]}	"Don't Go"	Wretch 32 featuring Josh Kumra	
3 September	"Don't Go"	Wretch 32 featuring Josh Kumra	
10 September	"You Need Me, I Don't Need You"	Ed Sheeran	
17 September	"Party All Night (Sleep All Day)"	Sean Kingston	
24 September	"Party All Night (Sleep All Day)"	Sean Kingston	
1 October ^{[a]}	"No Regrets"	Dappy	
8 October	"No Regrets"	Dappy	
15 October	"No Regrets"	Dappy	
22 October	"Stereo Hearts"	Gym Class Heroes featuring Adam Levine	
29 October	"Stereo Hearts"	Gym Class Heroes featuring Adam Levine	
5 November ^{[a]}	"Read All About It"	Professor Green featuring Emeli Sandé	
12 November ^{[a]} ^{[b]}	"Read All About It"	Professor Green featuring Emeli Sandé	
19 November	"Take a Chance on Me"	JLS	
26 November	"Good Feeling"	Flo Rida	
3 December	"Good Feeling"	Flo Rida	
10 December	"Good Feeling"	Flo Rida	
17 December	"Dedication to My Ex (Miss That)"	Lloyd featuring André 3000	
24 December	"Dedication to My Ex (Miss That)"	Lloyd featuring André 3000	
31 December	"Good Feeling"	Flo Rida	

== Notes ==
- ^{a} – The album was simultaneously number-one on the UK Singles Chart.
- ^{b} – The artist was simultaneously number-one on the R&B albums chart.

== Number-one artists ==
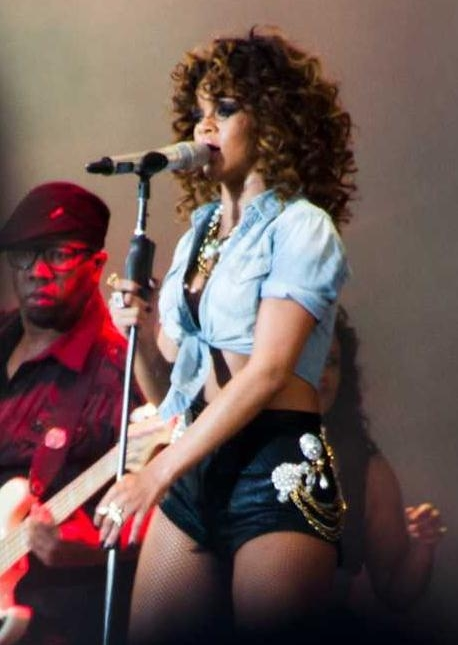
Rihanna holds the title for most weeks at the number-one spot, spending a total of eight weeks at the peak with singles "What's My Name?" and "S&M".

Position	Artist	Weeks at number one
1	Rihanna	9
2	Bruno Mars	5
3	Dappy	4
3	Flo Rida	4
3	JLS	4
4	Jennifer Lopez	3
4	Pitbull	3
4	Diddy-Dirty Money	3
5	Professor Green	2

== See also ==
- List of UK Singles Chart number ones of the 2010s
- List of UK Dance Singles Chart number ones of 2011
- List of UK Independent Singles Chart number ones of 2011
- List of UK Singles Downloads Chart number ones of the 2000s
- List of UK Rock & Metal Singles Chart number ones of 2011
- List of UK R&B Albums Chart number ones of 2011
