= Lift to Experience =

American indie rock band

- Origin: Denton, Texas, United States
- Genres: Indie rock, shoegaze, post-rock
- Years active: 1996 – 2001, 2016 – 2018
- Labels: Bella Union, Mute
- Members: Josh "The Bear" Browning; Josh T. Pearson; Andy "The Boy" Young

Lift to Experience is an American indie rock band from Denton, Texas, that formed in 1996 with vocalist and guitarist Josh T. Pearson, drummer Andy "The Boy" Young, and bassist Josh "The Bear" Browning. The band has thus far released only one studio album, The Texas-Jerusalem Crossroads (2001), which has earned critical acclaim and a cult following.

== Background ==
When the band performed at the South by Southwest festival in 2000, they impressed Simon Raymonde and Robin Guthrie so much that the duo decided to sign the band to their record label, Bella Union, that same day.

The band's characteristic sound comes from a solo guitar with heavy use of effects pedals and a modified Leslie speaker. The band's major work, the double-disc concept album The Texas-Jerusalem Crossroads, was released in 2001. The album's lyrics are replete with Biblical Christian imagery relating to the Second Coming of Christ and a professed love of Texas and the United States. The music features a multilayered Wall of Sound and feedback-driven aesthetic. The band performed three times on the John Peel BBC Radio 1 show.

The band was not active for a long period. Pearson has pursued a solo career, while Young formed Western Arms, a project with Elbow frontman Guy Garvey. Young now has a band, The Flowers of God, which released a four-song EP in September 2010. As of late 2011, Browning plays bass in Fort Worth, Texas-based shoegaze band Year of the Bear.

In June 2016, Lift to Experience performed a reunion show at London's Royal Festival Hall as part of the Guy Garvey-curated Meltdown Festival. It was preceded by three warm-up gigs in Texas.

Following the release of Josh T. Pearson's Last Of The Country Gentlemen, the band released a brand-new edition of The Texas-Jerusalem Crossroads through Mute Records. Released in February 2017, the original straight-to-tape recordings were remixed by the band and Matt Pence at the original studio where they had been made 15 years previously—"remixing the album the way it should have been mixed originally. As God intended".

Lift To Experience performed at the Green Man Festival in Wales in August 2017.

== Discography ==
- Lift To Experience (1997) – EP
- Callin' Out to Jesus in the Middle of the Night (2000) – split 7-inch with The Autumns ("White Nights")
- The Texas-Jerusalem Crossroads (2001) – double album
- These Are the Days (2001) – CD single
- The Texas-Jerusalem Crossroads 15th Anniversary Edition (2017) - double album / CD

== See also ==
- List of musicians from Denton, Texas
