= List of UK Independent Singles Chart number ones of 2011 =

The UK Indie Chart is a weekly chart that ranks the biggest-selling singles that are released on independent record labels in the United Kingdom. The chart is compiled by the Official Charts Company, and is based on both physical and digital single sales. In 2011, eleven different singles have topped the chart – with singer Adele and musician Example each claiming three of them.

== Summary ==
2011 opened with British-singer Adele continuing her reign at the top of the chart. Having first reached the peak on 3 October 2010; the cover of "Make You Feel My Love" spent a total of 10 weeks at the peak – 8 during the course of 2010, on four non-consecutive runs.

Adele's reign was then ended when Sound of 2011 nominee Nero reached number-one on the chart with their single "Me & You"; although after one week Adele had returned to the peak. Adele then replaced herself at the top of the chart with the lead single from second studio album 21, entitled "Rolling in the Deep"; which also debuted at number 2 on the UK Singles Chart. The single spent a total of four consecutive weeks at the peak before again being replaced by another single by herself, this time with the second single from 21, "Someone Like You"; which following from a performance at the 2011 Brit Awards climbed to number-one on the UK Singles Chart, marking Adele's first number-one.

After an incredible nine consecutive weeks at the peak, "Someone Like You" was dethroned on 24 April by Wretch 32 and Example's collaborative single "Unorthodox" – which having peaked at number 2 on the singles chart remained at the top spot for three consecutive weeks. On 15 May, Iranian singer Yasmin debuted at number-one on the chart with second single "Finish Line", although its time at the peak was short lived when Adele's "Someone Like You" returned to the number-one spot to continue a non-consecutive run currently totalling seventeen weeks.

Adele was then dethroned for a third time during 2011 when French DJ Alex Gaudino topped the chart with Kelly Rowland-collaborated "What a Feeling" on 4 June. The following week, rapper Example scored a number-one single with "Changed the Way You Kiss Me" – which also topped the singles and dance chart. The single marked the second number-one single from the musician in 2011 alone, having already claimed number-one singles with "Won't Go Quietly" (2010) and "Kickstarts" (2010). Having spent four consecutive weeks at the peak, Example was dethroned on 10 July by Ministry of Sound artist DJ Fresh with the Sian Evans-assisted "Louder" – which also topped the singles chart.

Following on from an impressive six weeks at the peak, 21 August saw Wretch 32 claim a second number-one single with the Josh Kumra-assisted "Don't Go" – which, much like the predecessor, topped the singles chart. The single spent two weeks at the number-one spot before musician Example claimed a third number-one single of the year with "Stay Awake" – marking his fifth number-one single overall.

== Number-one singles ==
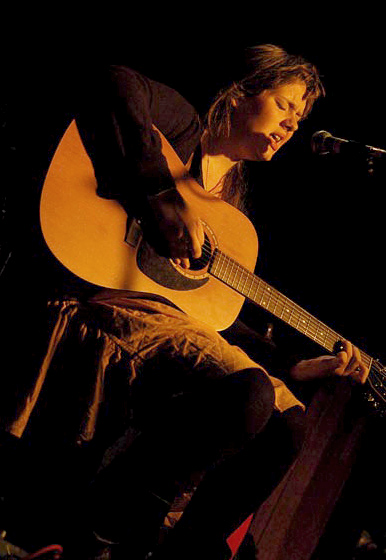
Singer Adele dominated early 2011; spending a total of sixteen weeks at the peak, firstly with her 2010 peaking "Make You Feel My Love" then with "Rolling in the Deep" and "Someone Like You".

Example earned a further three number-one singles in 2011 with "Changed the Way You Kiss Me", "Stay Awake" and the Wretch 32 collaboration "Unorthodox".

Key
†	Best-selling indie single of the year

Issue date	Single	Artist	Ref.
2 January	"Make You Feel My Love"	Adele	
9 January	"Me and You"	Nero	
16 January	"Make You Feel My Love"	Adele	
23 January	"Rolling in the Deep"	Adele	
30 January	"Rolling in the Deep"	Adele	
6 February	"Rolling in the Deep"	Adele	
13 February	"Rolling in the Deep"	Adele	
20 February ^{[A]}	"Someone Like You" †	Adele	
27 February ^{[A]}	"Someone Like You" †	Adele	
6 March ^{[A]}	"Someone Like You" †	Adele	
13 March ^{[A]}	"Someone Like You" †	Adele	
20 March	"Someone Like You" †	Adele	
27 March ^{[A]}	"Someone Like You" †	Adele	
3 April	"Someone Like You" †	Adele	
10 April	"Someone Like You" †	Adele	
17 April	"Someone Like You" †	Adele	
24 April	"Unorthodox"	Wretch 32 featuring Example	
1 May	"Unorthodox"	Wretch 32 featuring Example	
8 May	"Unorthodox"	Wretch 32 featuring Example	
15 May	"Finish Line"	Yasmin	
22 May	"Someone Like You" †	Adele	
29 May	"Someone Like You" †	Adele	
4 June	"What a Feeling"	Alex Gaudino featuring Kelly Rowland	
11 June ^{[A]}	"Changed the Way; You Kiss Me"	Example	
18 June ^{[A]}	"Changed the Way; You Kiss Me"	Example	
26 June	"Changed the Way; You Kiss Me"	Example	
3 July	"Changed the Way; You Kiss Me"	Example	
10 July ^{[A]}	"Louder"	DJ Fresh featuring Sian Evans	
17 July	"Louder"	DJ Fresh featuring Sian Evans	
24 July	"Louder"	DJ Fresh featuring Sian Evans	
31 July	"Louder"	DJ Fresh featuring Sian Evans	
7 August	"Louder"	DJ Fresh featuring Sian Evans	
14 August	"Louder"	DJ Fresh featuring Sian Evans	
21 August ^{[A]}	"Don't Go"	Wretch 32 featuring Josh Kumra	
28 August	"Don't Go"	Wretch 32 featuring Josh Kumra	
4 September ^{[A]}	"Stay Awake"	Example	
11 September	"Stay Awake"	Example	
18 September	"Stay Awake"	Example	
25 September	"Stay Awake"	Example	
2 October	"Stay Awake"	Example	
9 October	"Wherever You Will Go"	Charlene Soraia	
16 October	"Wherever You Will Go"	Charlene Soraia	
23 October	"Wherever You Will Go"	Charlene Soraia	
30 October	"Wherever You Will Go"	Charlene Soraia	
6 November	"Wherever You Will Go"	Charlene Soraia	
13 November	"Wherever You Will Go"	Charlene Soraia	
20 November	"Wherever You Will Go"	Charlene Soraia	
27 November	"Wherever You Will Go"	Charlene Soraia	
4 December	"Wherever You Will Go"	Charlene Soraia	
11 December	"Midnight Run"	Example	
18 December	"Midnight Run"	Example	
25 December	"Dominick the Donkey"	Lou Monte	

- ^{A} – The single was simultaneously number-one on the Singles Chart.

== Number-one artists ==
Position	Artist	Weeks at number one
1	Adele	17
2	Example	15
3	Charlene Soraia	9
4	DJ Fresh	6
5	Wretch 32	5
6	Alex Gaudino	1
6	Lou Monte	1
6	Nero	1
6	Yasmin	1

== See also ==
- List of UK Dance Singles Chart number ones of 2011
- List of UK Independent Albums Chart number ones of 2011
- List of UK Singles Downloads Chart number ones of the 2000s
- List of UK Rock & Metal Singles Chart number ones of 2011
- List of UK R&B Singles Chart number ones of 2011
