= List of UK Dance Singles Chart number ones of 2011 =

The UK Dance Chart is a chart that ranks the biggest-selling singles that are released in the United Kingdom. The chart is compiled by the Official Charts Company, and is based on both physical and digital single sales. The dates listed in the menus below represent the Saturday after the Sunday the chart was announced, as per the way the dates are given in chart publications such as the ones produced by Billboard, Guinness, and Virgin.

== Number-ones ==
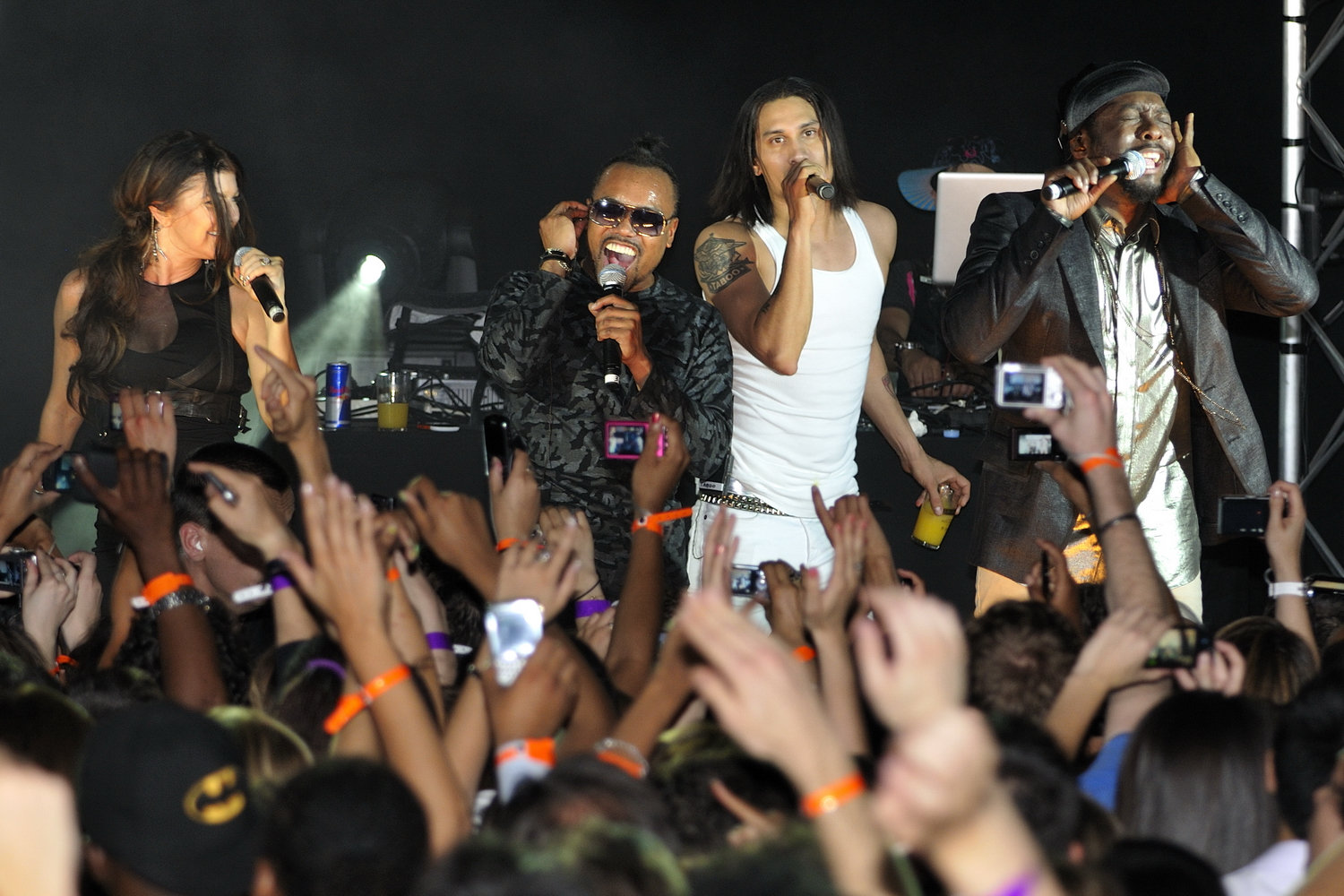
The Black Eyed Peas held off competition in early 2011 with lead single from The Beginning, "The Time" continuing its reign at number-one. The hit's successor, "Just Can't Get Enough" also saw success when it reached the peak.

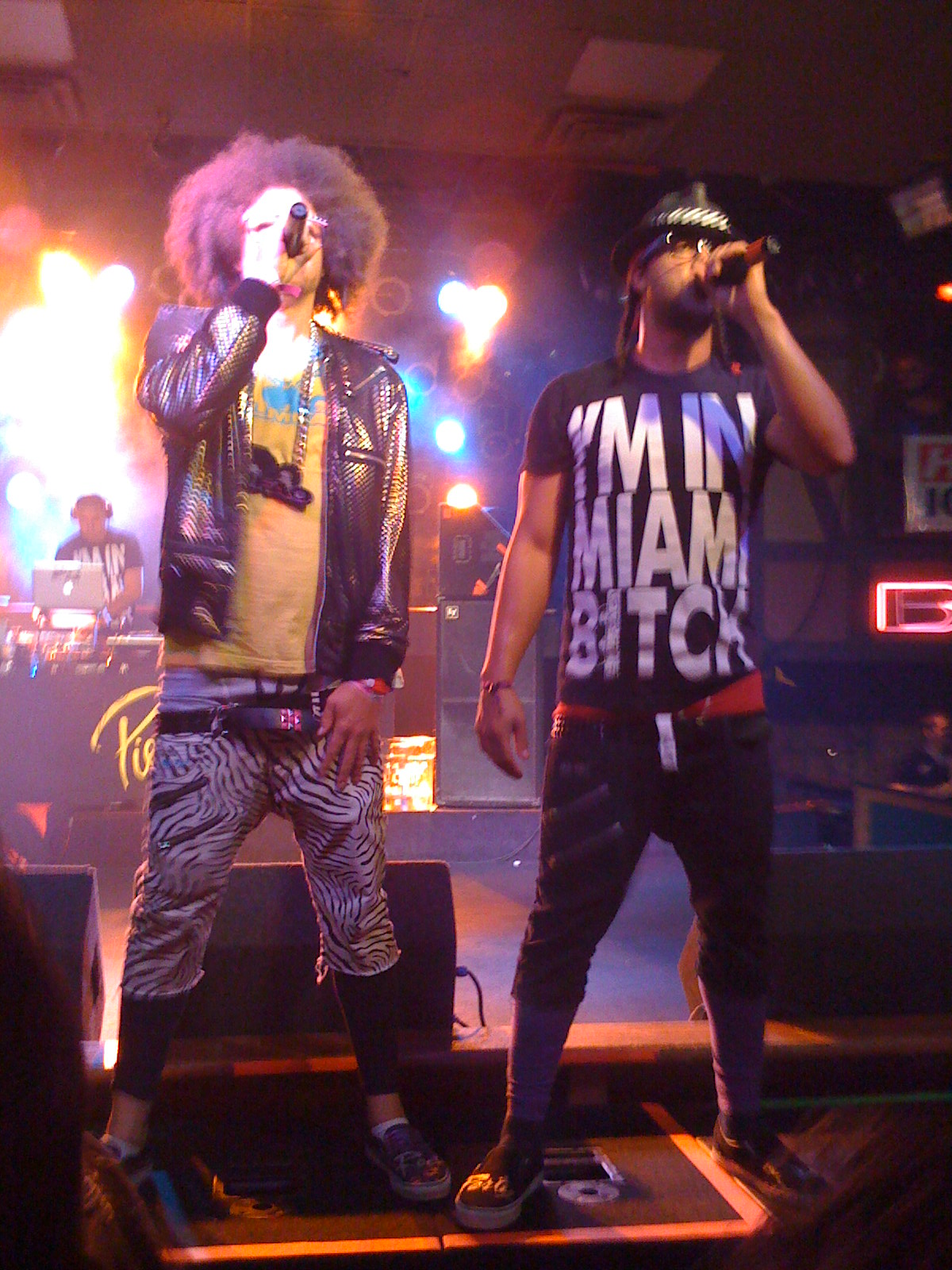
LMFAO reached new success in 2011, when international hit "Party Rock Anthem" spent nine weeks atop the chart; also spending four weeks at the summit on the singles chart.

Example achieved two number-one singles in 2011 – the first in May with "Changed the Way You Kiss Me" and the second in September with "Stay Awake".

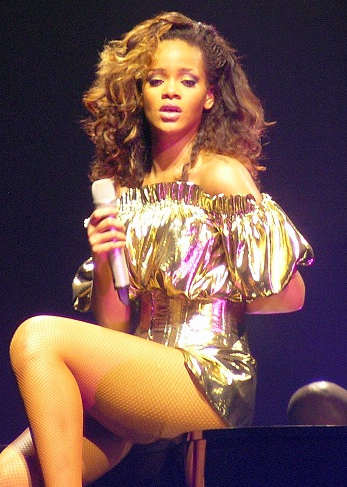
Popstar Rihanna dominated late 2011 with the Calvin Harris produced "We Found Love". The track spent eleven consecutive weeks at the summit, also spending six non-consecutive weeks at the number-one spot on the singles chart.

Key
†	Best-selling dance single of the year

Date	Single	Artist(s)	Ref.
1 January	"The Time (Dirty Bit)"	The Black Eyed Peas	
8 January	"The Time (Dirty Bit)"	The Black Eyed Peas	
15 January	"The Time (Dirty Bit)"	The Black Eyed Peas	
22 January	"Who's That Chick?"	David Guetta featuring Rihanna	
29 January	"Who's That Chick?"	David Guetta featuring Rihanna	
5 February	"Blind Faith"	Chase & Status featuring Liam Bailey	
12 February	"Blind Faith"	Chase & Status featuring Liam Bailey	
19 February	"Blind Faith"	Chase & Status featuring Liam Bailey	
26 February	"Who's That Chick?"	David Guetta featuring Rihanna	
5 March	"Who's That Chick?"	David Guetta featuring Rihanna	
12 March	"C'mon (Catch 'em by Surprise)"	Tiësto vs. Diplo featuring Busta Rhymes	
19 March	"C'mon (Catch 'em by Surprise)"	Tiësto vs. Diplo featuring Busta Rhymes	
26 March	"Just Can't Get Enough"	The Black Eyed Peas	
2 April	"Just Can't Get Enough"	The Black Eyed Peas	
9 April	"Party Rock Anthem" †	LMFAO featuring Lauren Bennett & GoonRock	
16 April	"Party Rock Anthem" †	LMFAO featuring Lauren Bennett & GoonRock	
23 April ^{[a]}	"Party Rock Anthem" †	LMFAO featuring Lauren Bennett & GoonRock	
30 April ^{[a]}	"Party Rock Anthem" †	LMFAO featuring Lauren Bennett & GoonRock	
7 May ^{[a]}	"Party Rock Anthem" †	LMFAO featuring Lauren Bennett & GoonRock	
14 May ^{[a]}	"Party Rock Anthem" †	LMFAO featuring Lauren Bennett & GoonRock	
21 May	"Party Rock Anthem" †	LMFAO featuring Lauren Bennett & GoonRock	
28 May	"Party Rock Anthem" †	LMFAO featuring Lauren Bennett & GoonRock	
4 June	"Party Rock Anthem" †	LMFAO featuring Lauren Bennett & GoonRock	
11 June	"Mr. Saxobeat"	Alexandra Stan	
18 June ^{[a]}	"Changed the Way; You Kiss Me"	Example	
25 June ^{[a]}	"Changed the Way; You Kiss Me"	Example	
2 July	"Changed the Way; You Kiss Me"	Example	
9 July	"Changed the Way; You Kiss Me"	Example	
16 July ^{[a]}	"Louder"	DJ Fresh featuring Sian Evans	
23 July	"Louder"	DJ Fresh featuring Sian Evans	
30 July	"Louder"	DJ Fresh featuring Sian Evans	
6 August	"Louder"	DJ Fresh featuring Sian Evans	
13 August	"Louder"	DJ Fresh featuring Sian Evans	
20 August ^{[a]}	"Promises"	Nero	
27 August	"Heaven"	Emeli Sandé	
3 September	"Feel So Close"	Calvin Harris	
10 September ^{[a]}	"Stay Awake"	Example	
17 September	"Stay Awake"	Example	
24 September	"Stay Awake"	Example	
1 October	"Feel So Close"	Calvin Harris	
8 October ^{[a]}	"Loca People"	Sak Noel	
15 October ^{[a]}	"We Found Love"	Rihanna featuring Calvin Harris	
22 October ^{[a]}	"We Found Love"	Rihanna featuring Calvin Harris	
29 October ^{[a]}	"We Found Love"	Rihanna featuring Calvin Harris	
5 November	"We Found Love"	Rihanna featuring Calvin Harris	
12 November	"We Found Love"	Rihanna featuring Calvin Harris	
19 November ^{[a]}	"We Found Love"	Rihanna featuring Calvin Harris	
26 November ^{[a]}	"We Found Love"	Rihanna featuring Calvin Harris	
3 December ^{[a]}	"We Found Love"	Rihanna featuring Calvin Harris	
10 December	"We Found Love"	Rihanna featuring Calvin Harris	
17 December	"We Found Love"	Rihanna featuring Calvin Harris	
24 December	"We Found Love"	Rihanna featuring Calvin Harris	
31 December	"Levels"	Avicii	

== Notes ==
- ^{a} – The single was simultaneously number-one on the singles chart.

== See also ==
- List of UK Singles Chart number ones of the 2010s
- List of UK Dance Albums Chart number ones of 2011
- List of UK Independent Singles Chart number ones of 2011
- List of UK Singles Downloads Chart number ones of the 2000s
- List of UK Rock & Metal Singles Chart number ones of 2011
- List of UK R&B Singles Chart number ones of 2011
