= The Texas-Jerusalem Crossroads =

Studio album by Lift to Experience
- Released: June 26, 2001
- Recorded: 1999
- Studio: 70hrtz Studio, Argyle, Texas
- Genre: Indie rock, shoegaze, post-rock
- Length: 93:22
- Label: Bella Union
- Producer: Josh T. Pearson

Singles from The Texas-Jerusalem Crossroads
- 1. "These Are the Days" Released: December 3, 2001

Professional ratings
Review scores
Source	Rating
AllMusic	4/5 stars
The Austin Chronicle	4.5/5 stars
Clash	8/10
Drowned in Sound	10/10
The Guardian	2/5 stars
The Irish Times	4/5 stars
The Line of Best Fit	8.5/10
NME	3.5/5 stars
Pitchfork	7.8/10
Uncut	4.5/5 stars

The Texas-Jerusalem Crossroads is the only studio album from Denton, Texas-based indie rock trio Lift to Experience. The double album was released on June 26, 2001, and is thus far the only full-length recording from the band. A concept album about the Second Coming of Jesus Christ that "casts Texas as the Promised Land", it was produced by guitarist/vocalist Josh T. Pearson, and mixing was handled by Simon Raymonde and Robin Guthrie, both of Cocteau Twins fame. The album was released on Guthrie and Raymonde's record label Bella Union. Receiving very little attention upon release, the album gradually found an audience via the internet and has developed a minor cult following.

The Texas-Jerusalem Crossroads was described by AllMusic reviewer Tim DiGravina as "blend[ing] My Bloody Valentine's sonic feedback with Kitchens of Distinction's swirling atmosphere and the grace of Jeff Buckley", with DiGravina adding, "What could have been a tiresome exploration of awkward religious theories is instead a spellbinding journey into the heart of human emotion and guitar dynamics". Kitty Empire described the debut as extraordinary, noted that it follows a narrative centered on spiritual searching and redemption, and praised its emotional intensity. She also pointed out the album's occasional use of humor and self-awareness. Overall, she characterized it as a challenging yet compelling work. Although Lift to Experience never officially announced a disbandment, the band splintered shortly after the album's release, with Pearson re-emerging as a solo artist in the 2010s.

The album was remastered and reissued for its 15-year anniversary by Mute Records on February 3, 2017. The album was reissued across three separate formats, all featuring revised artwork: a 2-CD set; a double vinyl LP set pressed on blue and red colored vinyl; and a deluxe 4-LP box set including the band's first demo EP and live recordings. The reissue coincides with the band's reunion and performance at Meltdown Festival 2016 curated by Elbow frontman Guy Garvey.

== Track listing ==
All tracks are written by Josh T. Pearson (words) and Lift to Experience (music).

Part one: Texas
No.	Title	Length
1.	"Just as Was Told"	6:43
2.	"Down Came the Angels"	5:40
3.	"Falling from Cloud 9"	4:33
4.	"With Crippled Wings"	9:58
5.	"Waiting to Hit"	5:20
6.	"The Ground So Soft"	7:06

Part two: Jerusalem
No.	Title	Length
7.	"These Are the Days"	8:41
8.	"When We Shall Touch"	4:20
9.	"Down with the Prophets"	6:41
10.	"To Guard and to Guide You"	5:24
11.	"Into the Storm"	10:14
12.	"The Hidden Song" (Included as a hidden track following 14:06 of silence after "Into the Storm" on CD editions; "Into the Storm" lasts 28:56 in total)	4:45

== Credits ==
Musicians

- Josh T. Pearson – guitar, vocals
- Josh Browning – bass
- Andy Young – drums, cymbals
- Scott Danbom – fiddle

Production

- Josh T. Pearson – producer
- Dave Willingham – engineer, recording, mastering
- Simon Raymonde – mixing (at September Sound)
- Robin Guthrie – additional mixing (at September Sound)
- Breanne Trammell – photography
- Karen Raymonde – sleeve design (from an original concept by Lift to Experience)

Remaster credits

- Mixed by Matt Pence at Echo Lab, Argyle, Texas
- Additional engineering by Dan Williams at Studio Mute, London, England
- Mastered by Dave McNair at Dave McNair Mastering, Winston-Salem, North Carolina
- Vinyl cut by Jeff Powell at Take Out Vinyl, Memphis, Tennessee
- Reissue design by Louise Hendy
- Art direction by Josh T. Pearson with Paul A. Taylor
