= Josh T. Pearson =

American singer-songwriter

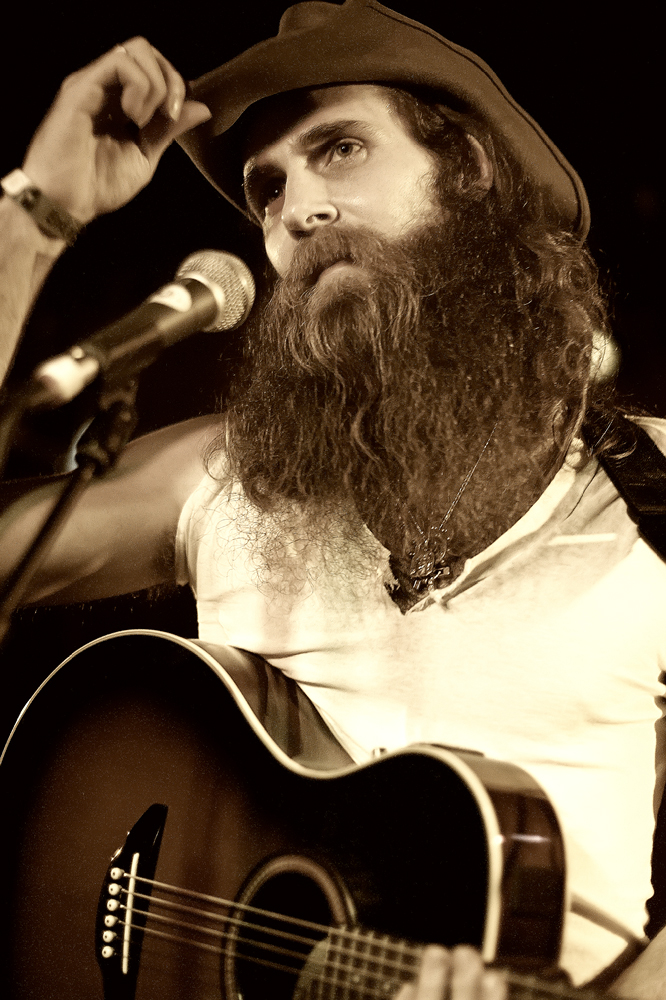

Background information
- Instrument: Guitar
- Labels: Mute, Bella Union

Josh T. Pearson is an American musician from Texas, United States. He is known for his work with the band Lift to Experience and his subsequent solo career.

== Lift to Experience ==
In 1996, Pearson formed the short-lived, but critically acclaimed band Lift to Experience, who released one double album, The Texas-Jerusalem Crossroads on Bella Union in 2001, before splitting up soon after.

Lift to Experience reformed in 2016 to perform a one-off show at London's Royal Festival Hall. The band subsequently remixed The Texas-Jerusalem Crossroads and went on to play at the Green Man Festival in Wales in August 2017.

== Wilderness years ==
After Lift to Experience disbanded, Pearson retreated to Limestone County, Texas, doing odd jobs to get by while he continued playing and writing music. Eventually, he left Texas for Europe, where he lived in Berlin and Paris while playing live to support himself. He also toured with Dirty Three, Archie Bronson Outfit, 65daysofstatic and notably performed at the All Tomorrow's Parties festival several times including those curated by Dirty Three (2007) and My Bloody Valentine (2009).

His only studio recording during this time is a cover of Hank Williams' song "I'm So Lonesome I Could Cry", which was released on 7-inch split single also featuring Dirty Three, and appearance on West Country Night - Session One compilation album. He also provided guitar and backing vocals on two songs, "Seal Jubilee" and "Trophy", on Bat for Lashes' 2006 Mercury Music Prize-nominated album Fur and Gold.

In 2005, Pearson released the CD-R live album To Hull and Back, recorded at Hull's The New Adelphi Club. Featuring songs he toured until 2008 such as "The Clash", "Devil Is On The Run" and "Sins Of The Father", it is available on YouTube with the artist's permission.

== Solo career ==
In January 2010, Pearson recorded an album of acoustic ballads at Klangbild Studios in Berlin. During album recording sessions, he also did a session with Berlin-based pianist and composer Dustin O'Halloran (two songs from this session were later released in support of Record Store Day 2011) and later that year took part in Yann Tiersen's project Dust Lane Inc.

In November 2010, Mute Records announced the signing of Josh T. Pearson and release of his debut solo album Last of the Country Gentlemen in March 2011.

Pearson spent most of 2011–12 promoting the album and touring extensively in its support, playing many solo shows including South by Southwest Music Conference in Austin and sold-out nights at Union Chapel, Islington and Barbican Centre in London, festivals including Primavera Sound Festival, Latitude Festival, Green Man Festival and End of the Road Festival, while also sharing stage with likes of Fleet Foxes and Joanna Newsom. He made his TV debut on the BBC Two show, Later... with Jools Holland, in April 2011.

Last of the Country Gentlemen was named Rough Trade's "Album of the Year 2011" and nominated in two categories, Best Album and "Breakthrough Act, at the 2011 Mojo Awards and shortlisted for the 2011 Uncut Music Award. Uncut placed the album at number 5, while Mojo ranked it number 7, Rolling Stone number 33 and Q number 42 in their "Top 50 Albums of 2011". In December 2013 Uncut included Last of the Country Gentlemen in their pick of the top 50 Greatest Singer/Songwriter Albums of All Time list.

In October 2011, Pearson took part in "A Room for London – Sounds from a Room" art project, in which leading artists of all disciplines used a one-bedroom Joseph Conrad's book Heart of Darkness influenced architectural installation, in the form of a riverboat perched on a rooftop of Queen Elizabeth Hall at Southbank Centre in London as a workspace. During his two-day residency, Pearson recorded 10 gospel songs followed by a live webcast.

Pearson played and appeared in the 2002 French experimental film by Philippe Grandrieux entitled, La Vie nouvelle. Pearson's song "Country Dumb" appears in the 2012 Martin McDonagh-directed motion picture Seven Psychopaths and "Woman, When I've Raised Hell" in the 2013 Ridley Scott thriller film written by Cormac McCarthy, The Counselor.

In April 2018, Pearson released his second solo studio album The Straight Hits!, again on Mute Records.

Mark Lanegan called Pearson "a one of a kind artist", while Guy Garvey of Elbow called him "the greatest male vocalist of our time".

== Discography ==
=== Albums ===
- Last of the Country Gentlemen (Mute, 2011)
- The Straight Hits! (Mute, 2018)

=== Singles / EPs ===
- "I'm So Lonesome I Could Cry" (Bella Union, 2006) – split 7-inch single w/ Dirty Three
- "Country Dumb" (Mute, 2011) – single
- "Sweetheart I Ain't Your Christ / Country Dumb" (Mute, 2011) – 12-inch Record Store Day release (limited edition of 250)
- "Woman, When I've Raised Hell" (Mute, 2011) – single
- "Sorry with a Song" (Mute, 2011) – single
- Rough Trade Christmas Bonus (Mute, 2011) – limited edition EP for Rough Trade Shops

=== Live bootlegs ===
- To Hull and Back (self-released, 2005) – CD-R album, Recorded live at The New Adelphi Club in Hull, England
- The King Is Dead (Mute Czechoslovakia, 2011) – 12-inch album (limited edition of 1000). Recorded live at Union Chapel in London, England
