= Last of the Country Gentlemen =

Studio album by Josh T. Pearson
- Released: March 14, 2011
- Genres: Folk, alternative country
- Length: 58:50
- Label: Mute
- Producer: Peter Sasala

Josh T. Pearson chronology
Last of the Country Gentlemen (2011)	The Straight Hits! (2018)

Last of the Country Gentlemen is the debut studio album by Texan musician Josh T. Pearson. It was released in March 2011 by Mute Records.

The album was recorded in Berlin in two nights, freshly written and committed to tape after Pearson saw how the songs affected audiences when he played them live.

== History ==
The songs on the new album (the first since 2001) are all new, according to Josh T. Pearson. "The last couple of years I got sober and started working again with a little more discipline. Before I was writing all the time but never finishing," he told Q magazine. If there was any pressure at first for a new material, in a couple of years it was gone:

I disappeared for a while, I needed to get out of Texas, get on the road, see some of the world. I don't like being told what to do, I guess. People kept telling me I had to put out an album. I only want to put out a good record and if you put out a good record it comes with a cost. It'll demand more things from you than you're willing to give. I haven't seen a dime from the Lift... records in eight years at least, so it wasn't like a constant reminder that people were still interested.

The album, recorded in "cold, cold Berlin", came as a result of a relationship he described as "pretty heartbreaking" and was difficult to create. "I went grey overnight... It was one of the most painful times of my life. I can't listen to it. I haven't listened to it since we've finished it", he said. For a while Pearson thought the album shouldn't be released at all, so painful was the feel. "It's why people go to a priest - so no one else hears you. But playing songs live seemed to help people. I don't know if it's a big mistake, but it's coming out now. Maybe it can do some good," he said.

== Reception ==
Professional ratings
Aggregate scores
Source	Rating
AnyDecentMusic?	8.0/10
Metacritic	77/100
Review scores
Source	Rating
AllMusic	4/5 stars
The Daily Telegraph	3/5 stars
Financial Times	4/5 stars
The Guardian	3/5 stars
Mojo	4/5 stars
Pitchfork	4.0/10
Q	4/5 stars
Record Collector	4/5 stars
Rolling Stone	4/5 stars
Uncut	5/5 stars

Uncut placed the album at number 5 on its list of "Top 50 albums of 2011", while Mojo, Rolling Stone, and Q ranked it 7, 33, and 42, respectively.

David Edwards of Drowned in Sound gave the album a rare 10/10 review and lauded its emotional power, stating "We share and revere in his redemption, rarely has something so physically fragile sounded so mighty in its emotional resonance. A truly magnificent record".

== Track listing ==
=== CD edition ===
The songs on the standard CD version of the album are:

1. "Thou Art Loosed" – 3:14
2. "Sweetheart I Ain't Your Christ" – 11:45
3. "Woman, When I've Raised Hell" – 7:00
4. "Honeymoon's Great! Wish You Were Her" – 13:01
5. "Sorry with a Song" – 10:50
6. "Country Dumb" – 10:13
7. "Drive Her Out" – 2:33

=== LP edition ===
The songs on the vinyl LP version of the album are:

1. "Thou Art Loosed" – 3:14
2. "Sweetheart I Ain't Your Christ" – 11:45
3. "Woman, When I've Raised Hell" – 7:00
4. "Honeymoon's Great! Wish You Were Her" – 13:01
5. "Sorry with a Song" – 10:50
6. "Country Dumb" – 10:13
7. "Last of the Country Gentlemen" – 8:06
8. "Drive Her Out" – 2:33

=== Rough Trade Shops edition ===
The songs on the exclusive version of the album available only at Rough Trade Shops are:

Disc one

1. "Thou Art Loosed" – 3:14
2. "Sweetheart I Ain't Your Christ" – 11:45
3. "Woman, When I've Raised Hell" – 7:00
4. "Honeymoon's Great! Wish You Were Her" – 13:01
5. "Sorry with a Song" – 10:50
6. "Country Dumb" – 10:13
7. "Drive Her Out" – 2:33

Disc two

1. "Sweetheart I Ain't Your Christ" (electric version) – 4:35
2. "Woman, When I've Raised Hell" (electric version) – 4:25
3. "Sorry with a Song" (alternative version) – 4:21
4. "Sweetheart I Ain't Your Christ" (electric instrumental version) – 6:07
5. "Woman, When I've Raised Hell" (electric instrumental version) – 3:28

== Personnel ==
- Written and performed by Josh T. Pearson
- Published by Mute Song Ltd.
- Produced by Peter Sasala
- Recorded by Martin J. Fiedler at Klangbild Studios, Berlin
- Mixed by Gareth Jones at Mute Studio, London; assisted by Neil Quinlan (except "Sweetheart I Ain't Your Christ" mixed by Martin J. Fiedler at Klangbild Studios, Berlin)
- Additional recording and mixing by David "Saxon" Greenep at Mute Studio, London
- Strings arranged and performed by Mike Siddell (3, 6), Warren Ellis (3, 4), Will Calderbank (3), and SixToes (4).

== Chart performance ==
Chart (2011)	Peak position
US Billboard Top Country Albums	74
