= List of UK R&B Albums Chart number ones of 2011 =

The logo of the Official Charts Company, responsible for compiling all of the official music charts in the United Kingdom, including the R&B albums chart.

The UK R&B Chart is a weekly chart, first introduced in October 1994, that ranks the 40 biggest-selling singles and albums that are classified in the R&B genre in the United Kingdom. The chart is compiled by the Official Charts Company, and is based on sales of CDs, downloads, vinyl and other formats over the previous seven days.

The following are the number-one albums of 2011.

== Number-one albums ==
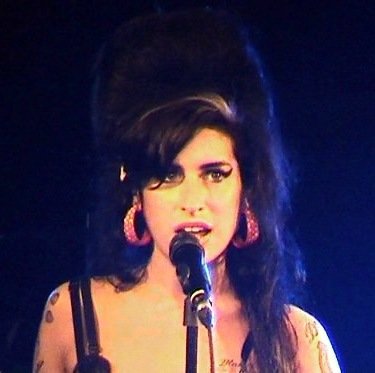
Following her death in late July, Amy Winehouse's 5× Grammy winning Back to Black reached the number one spot for three non-consecutive weeks in 2011.

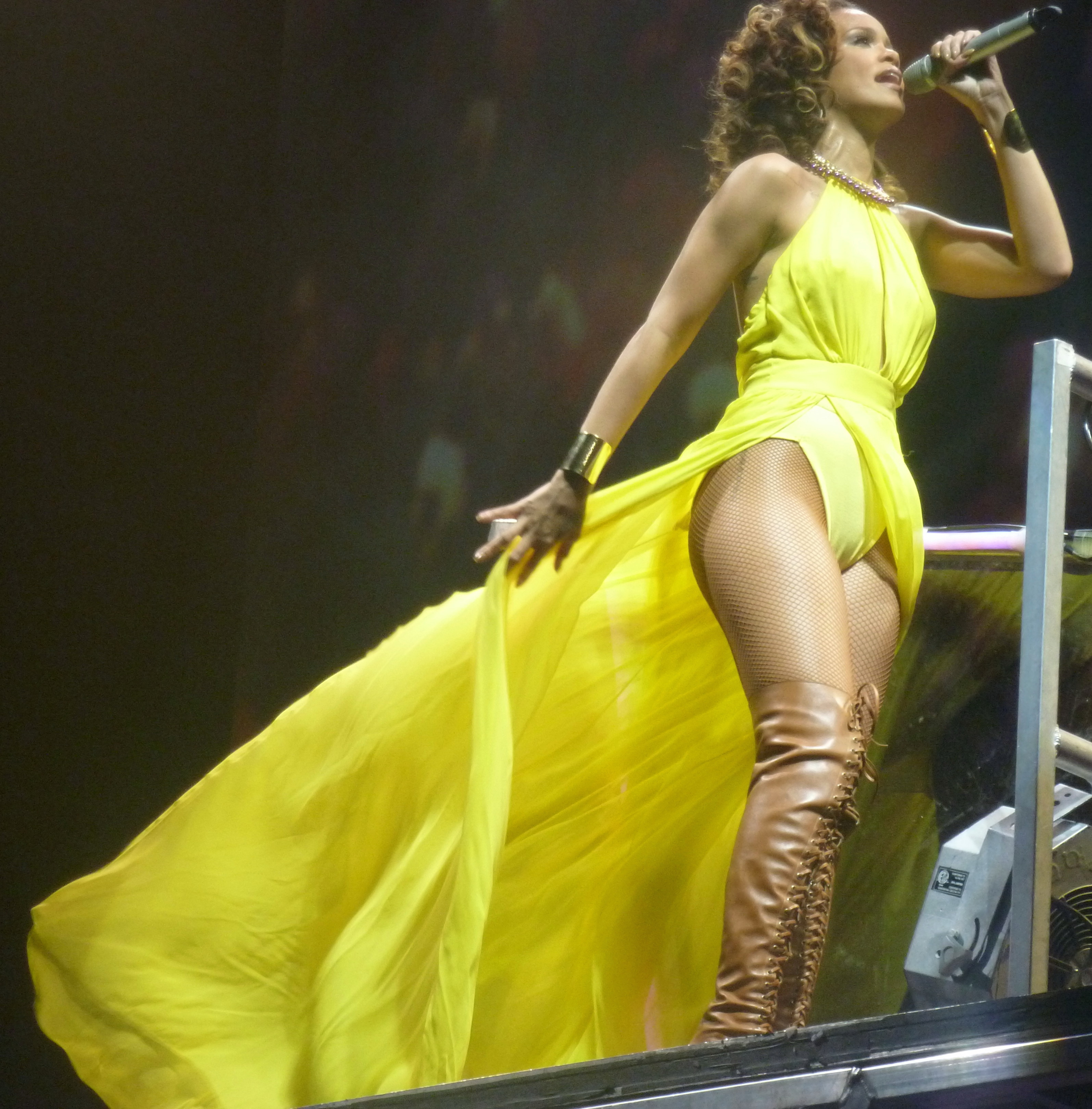
Loud by Rihanna clocked 26 weeks at number one across six separate runs throughout the year, with an additional three weeks in 2010 bringing its total to 29 weeks. It has since earned a 6× Platinum BPI certification, denoting sales of more than 1.8 million copies.

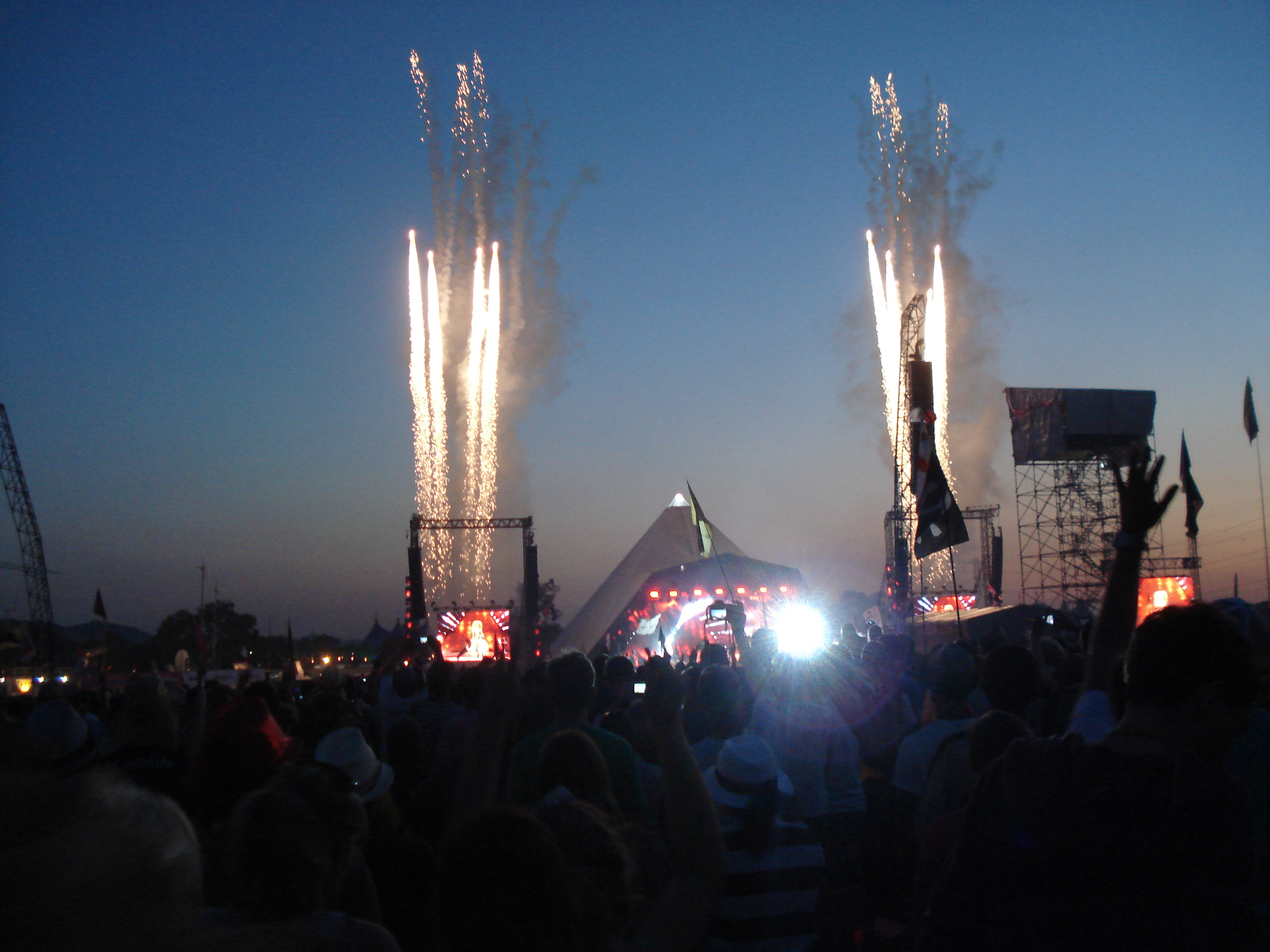
Beyoncé's 4 saw four weeks at the top of the chart, following her performance at the 2011 Glastonbury Festival (pictured), which gained record TV viewing figures of 2.6 million in the UK.

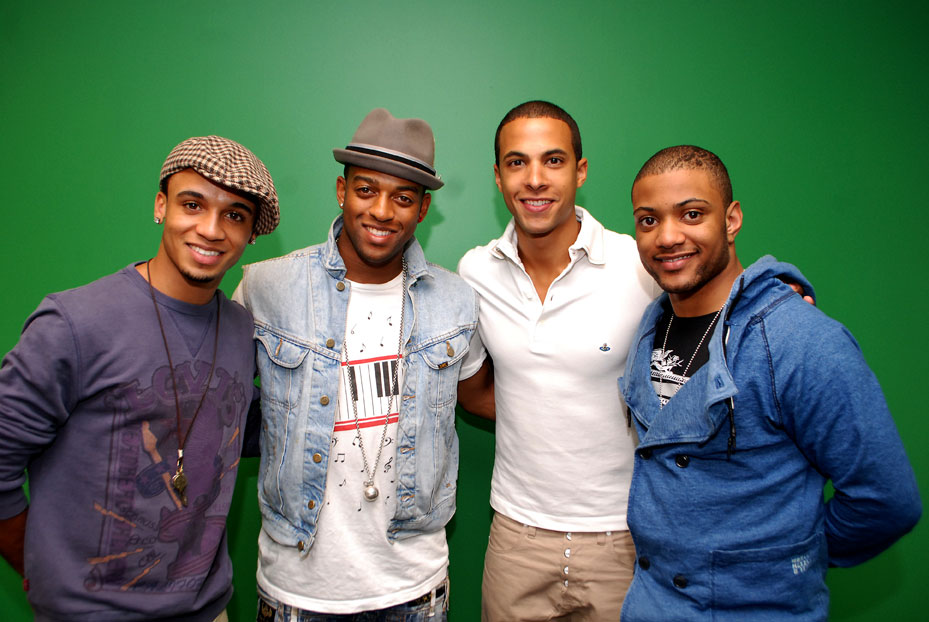
Jukebox marks the third number-one R&B album by JLS in three years, and their third platinum certified album as well.

Issue date	Album	Artist	Record label	Ref.
1 January ^{[b]}	Loud	Rihanna	Def Jam/SRP	
8 January ^{[a]}^{[b]}	Loud	Rihanna	Def Jam/SRP	
15 January ^{[a]}^{[b]}	Loud	Rihanna	Def Jam/SRP	
23 January ^{[a]}^{[b]}	Loud	Rihanna	Def Jam/SRP	
29 January	Loud	Rihanna	Def Jam/SRP	
5 February	Loud	Rihanna	Def Jam/SRP	
12 February	Loud	Rihanna	Def Jam/SRP	
19 February	Loud	Rihanna	Def Jam/SRP	
26 February	Loud	Rihanna	Def Jam/SRP	
5 March ^{[b]}	Loud	Rihanna	Def Jam/SRP	
12 March ^{[b]}	Loud	Rihanna	Def Jam/SRP	
19 March ^{[b]}	Loud	Rihanna	Def Jam/SRP	
26 March ^{[b]}	Loud	Rihanna	Def Jam/SRP	
2 April	F.A.M.E	Chris Brown	Jive	
9 April	Loud	Rihanna	Def Jam/SRP	
16 April	Loud	Rihanna	Def Jam/SRP	
23 April	Loud	Rihanna	Def Jam/SRP	
30 April	Loud	Rihanna	Def Jam/SRP	
7 May	Loud	Rihanna	Def Jam/SRP	
14 May	Hot Sauce Committee Part Two	Beastie Boys	Capitol	
21 May	Loud	Rihanna	Def Jam/SRP	
28 May	Loud	Rihanna	Def Jam/SRP	
4 June	The Lady Killer	Cee Lo Green	Elektra	
11 June	Loud	Rihanna	Def Jam/SRP	
18 June	Loud	Rihanna	Def Jam/SRP	
25 June	Hell: The Sequel	Bad Meets Evil	Interscope/Shady	
2 July	Planet Pit	Pitbull	Polo Grounds/J/Mr. 305/Sony	
9 July ^{[a]}	4	Beyoncé	Parkwood/Columbia	
16 July ^{[a]}	4	Beyoncé	Parkwood/Columbia	
23 July ^{[b]}	4	Beyoncé	Parkwood/Columbia	
30 July ^{[b]}	4	Beyoncé	Parkwood/Columbia	
6 August ^{[a]}	Back to Black	Amy Winehouse	Island	
13 August ^{[a]}	Back to Black	Amy Winehouse	Island	
20 August ^{[a]}	Watch the Throne	Jay-Z and Kanye West	Roc-A-Fella/Roc Nation/ Def Jam	
27 August	Watch the Throne	Jay-Z and Kanye West	Roc-A-Fella/Roc Nation/ Def Jam	
3 September	Black and White	Wretch 32	Ministry of Sound	
10 September	Tha Carter 4	Lil Wayne	Young Money/Cash Money/ Universal Republic	
17 September	Tha Carter 4	Lil Wayne	Young Money/Cash Money/ Universal Republic	
24 September	Loud	Rihanna	Def Jam/SRP	
1 October	Loud	Rihanna	Def Jam/SRP	
8 October	Back to Black	Amy Winehouse	Island	
15 October	The Lady Killer	Cee Lo Green	Elektra	
22 October	Future History	Jason Derulo	Beluga Heights/Warner Bros.	
29 October	Loud	Rihanna	Def Jam/SRP	
5 November	Loud	Rihanna	Def Jam/SRP	
12 November ^{[b]}	At Your Inconvenience	Professor Green	Virgin	
19 November	At Your Inconvenience	Professor Green	Virgin	
26 November	Jukebox	JLS	Epic/Sony	
3 December ^{[a]}	Talk That Talk	Rihanna	Def Jam/SRP	
10 December	Talk That Talk	Rihanna	Def Jam/SRP	
17 December	Talk That Talk	Rihanna	Def Jam/SRP	
24 December	Talk That Talk	Rihanna	Def Jam/SRP	
31 December	Talk That Talk	Rihanna	Def Jam/SRP	

== Notes ==
- ^{a} - The album was simultaneously number-one on the UK Albums Chart.
- ^{b} - The artist was simultaneously number-one on the R&B Singles Chart.

== See also ==
- List of UK Albums Chart number ones of 2011
- List of UK R&B Chart number-one singles of 2011
