= List of UK Rock & Metal Singles Chart number ones of 2011 =

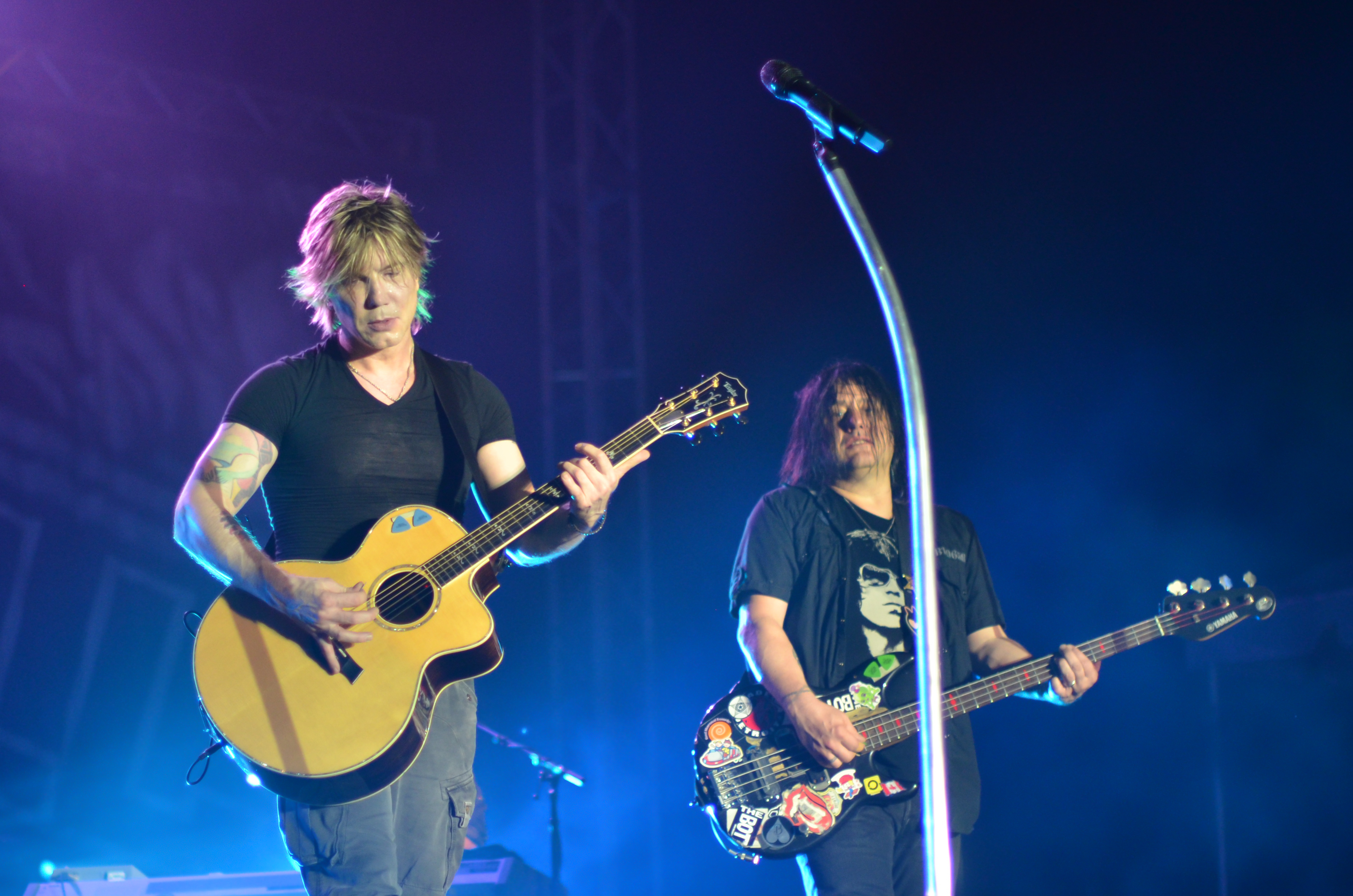
"Iris" by Goo Goo Dolls was the longest-running number-one of 2011, spending ten weeks atop the chart.

The UK Rock & Metal Singles Chart is a record chart which ranks the best-selling rock and heavy metal songs in the United Kingdom. Compiled and published by the Official Charts Company, the data is based on each track's weekly physical sales, digital downloads and streams. In 2011, there were 20 singles that topped the 53 published charts. The first number-one single of the year was 2003's "Christmas Time (Don't Let the Bells End)" by The Darkness, which topped the chart published on Boxing Day 2010. "Christmas Time (Don't Let the Bells End)" was also the final number-one single of the year, topping the final chart of the year published on Christmas Day.

The most successful song on the UK Rock & Metal Singles Chart in 2011 was "Iris" by Goo Goo Dolls, which spent ten weeks at number one across three different spells. "Bring Me to Life" by Evanescence was number one for five weeks in 2011, while the band also topped the chart with "My Immortal" (two weeks) and "What You Want" (one week). Muse spent seven weeks at number one with "Feeling Good", as did Foo Fighters with "Walk" (three weeks), "Best of You" and "Arlandria" (two weeks each). My Chemical Romance were number one for five weeks in 2011, four of which were with "Sing". "Sweet Child o' Mine" by Guns N' Roses was also number one for four weeks, while Nickelback's "When We Stand Together" was number one for three. "Christmas Time (Don't Let the Bells End)" spent two weeks at number one during 2011.

== Chart history ==
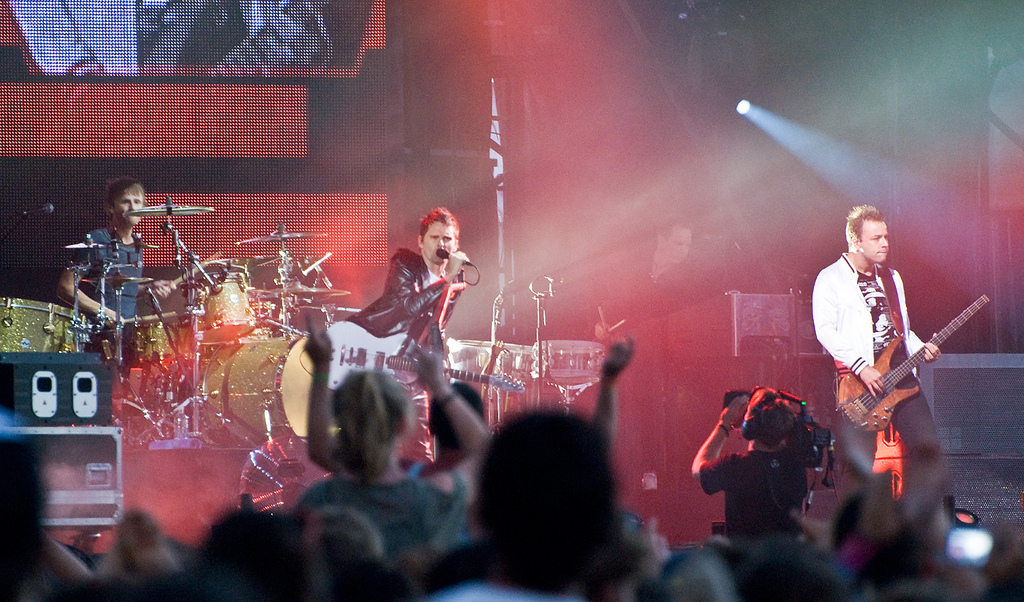
Muse spent seven weeks atop the UK Rock & Metal Singles Chart in 2011 with their cover of "Feeling Good".

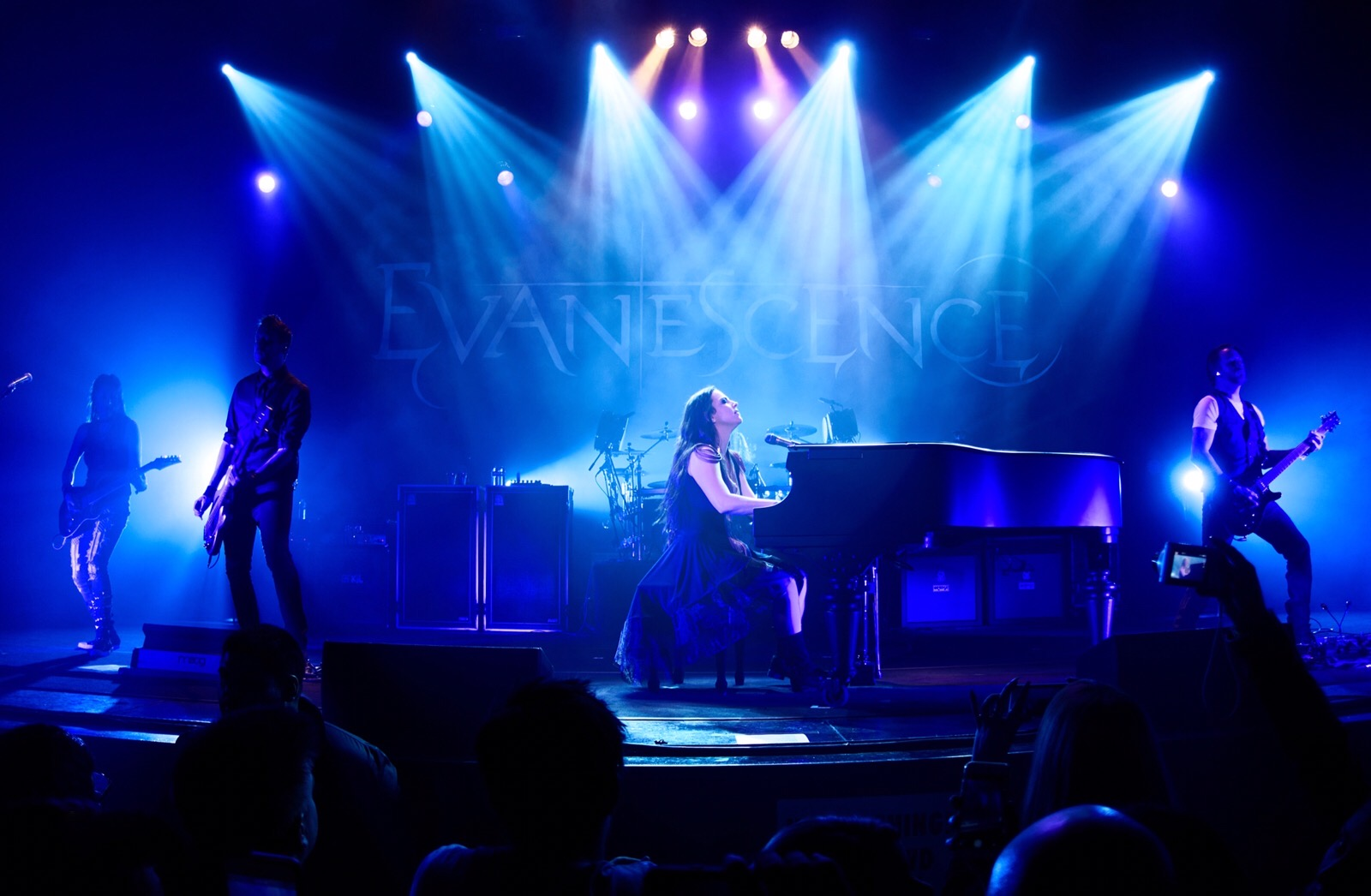
Evanescence were number one for seven weeks in 2011 with three songs: "Bring Me to Life", "My Immortal" and "What You Want".

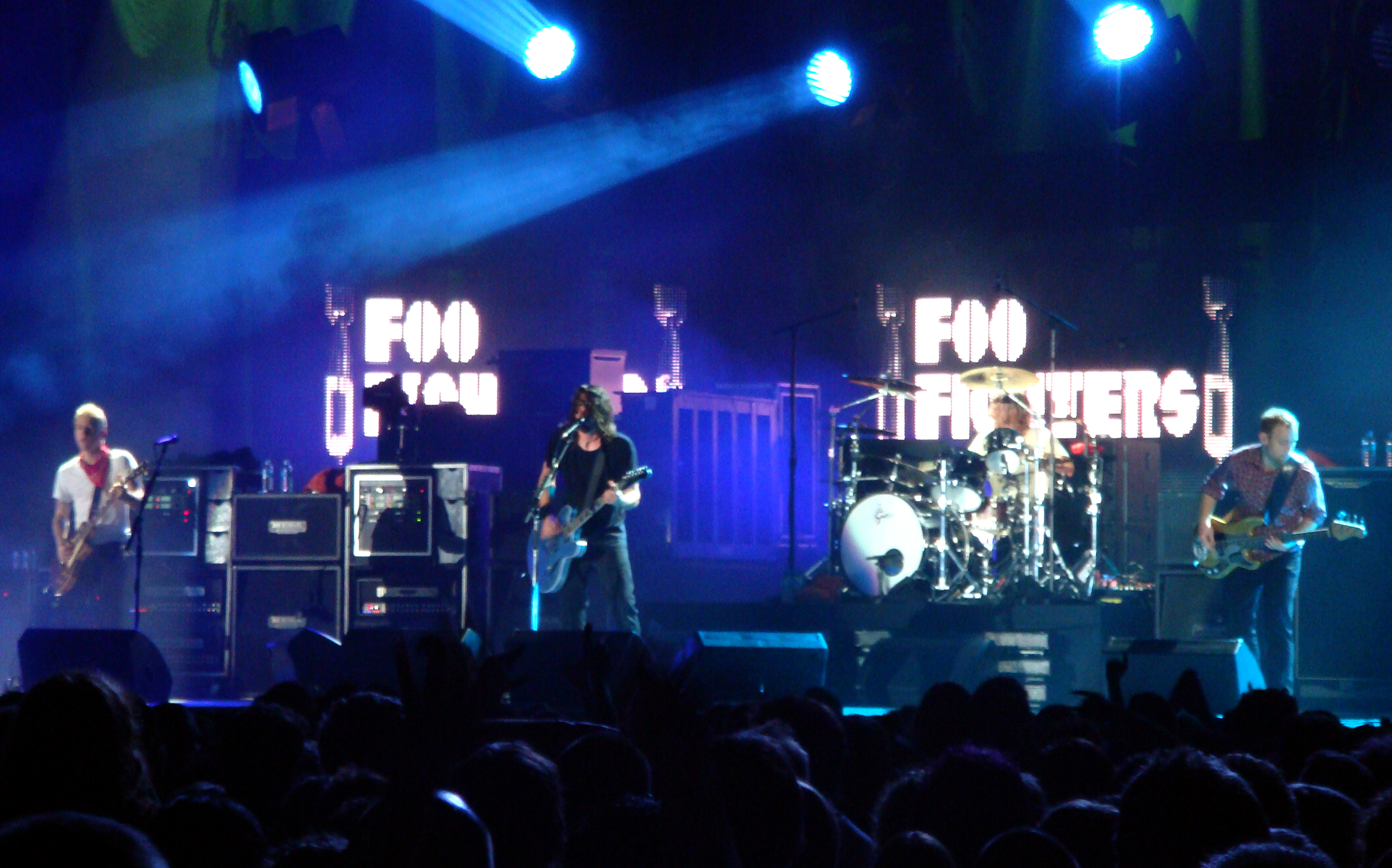
Foo Fighters also spent seven weeks at number one on the chart in 2011, with "Walk" (three weeks), "Best of You" and "Arlandria" (two weeks each).

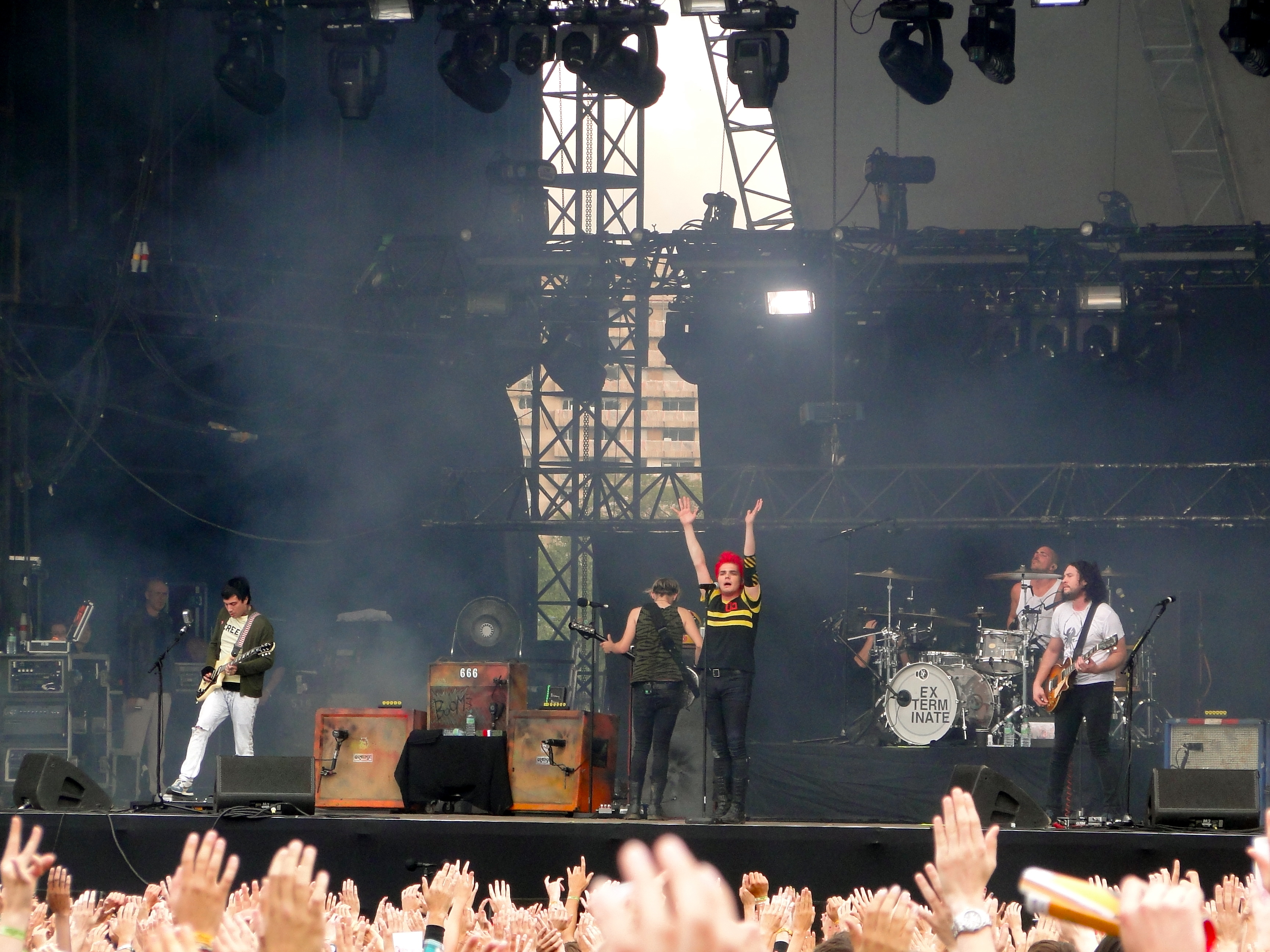
My Chemical Romance topped the chart with two releases in 2011, including four weeks with "Sing".

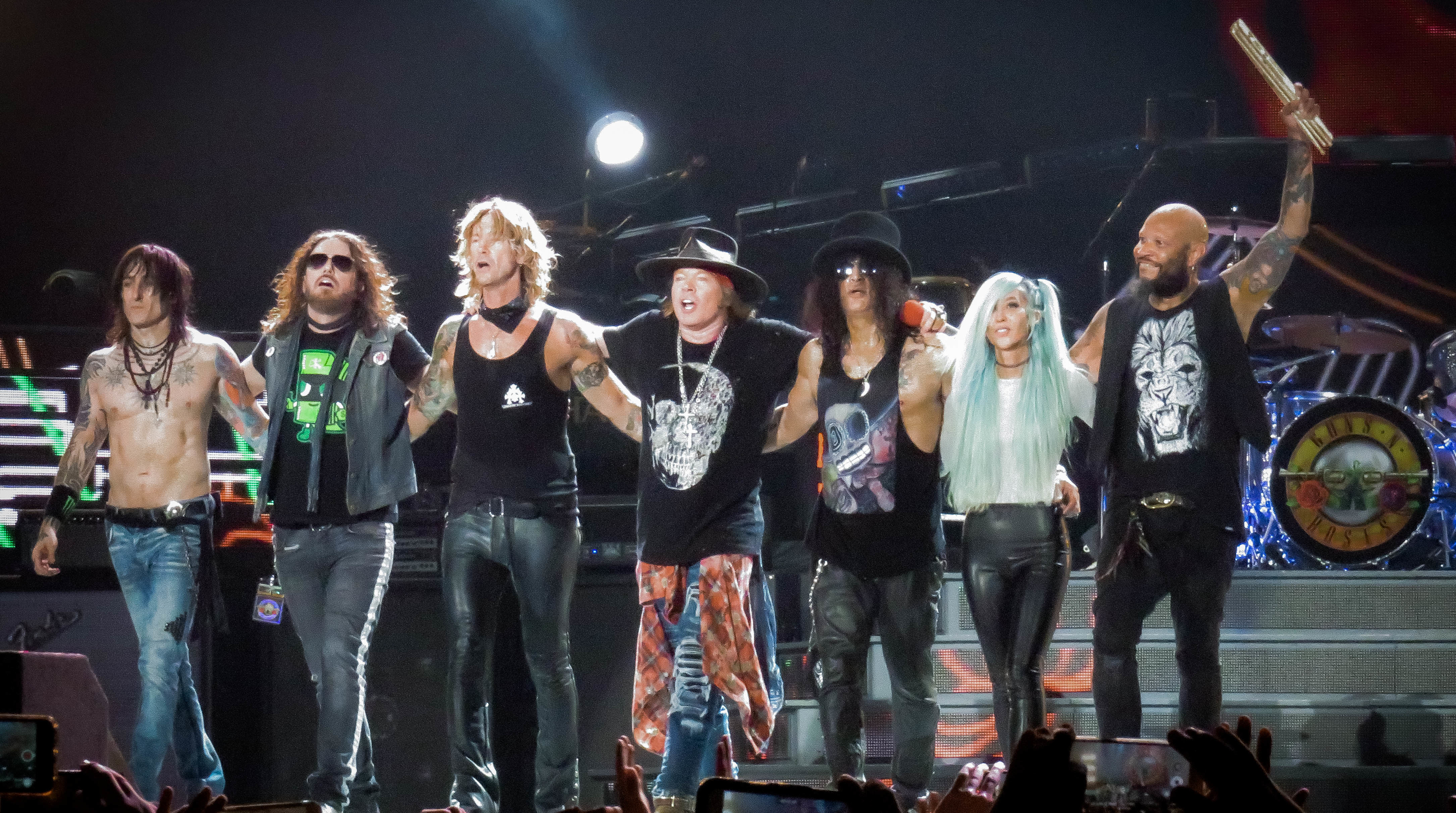
Guns N' Roses spent four weeks at number one with "Sweet Child o' Mine".

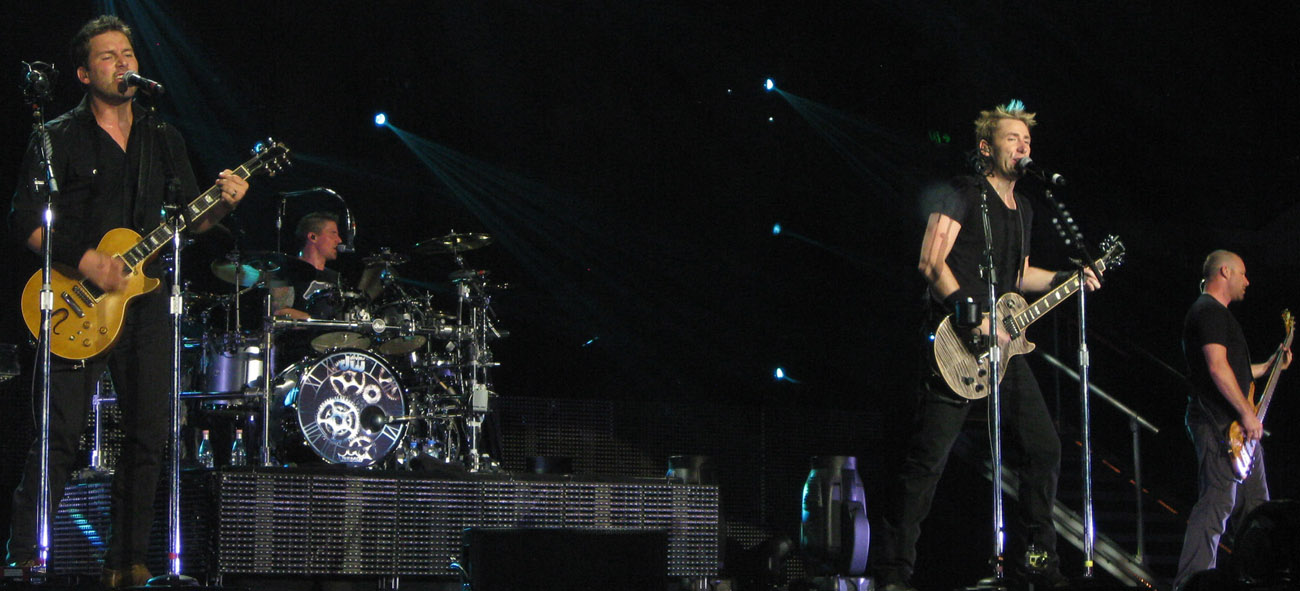
"When We Stand Together" by Nickelback was number one for three weeks in December 2011.

Issue date	Single	Artist(s)	Record label(s)	Ref.
1 January	"Christmas Time (Don't Let the Bells End)"	The Darkness	Must Destroy	
8 January	"Livin' on a Prayer"	Bon Jovi	Mercury	
15 January	"Feeling Good"	Muse	A&E	
22 January	"Feeling Good"	Muse	A&E	
29 January	"The Only Exception"	Paramore	Atlantic	
5 February	"Feeling Good"	Muse	A&E	
12 February	"Feeling Good"	Muse	A&E	
19 February	"Feeling Good"	Muse	A&E	
26 February	"Feeling Good"	Muse	A&E	
5 March	"Feeling Good"	Muse	A&E	
12 March	"Sweet Child o' Mine"	Guns N' Roses	Geffen	
19 March	"Sweet Child o' Mine"	Guns N' Roses	Geffen	
26 March	"Sweet Child o' Mine"	Guns N' Roses	Geffen	
2 April	"Sweet Child o' Mine"	Guns N' Roses	Geffen	
9 April	"Planetary (Go!)"	My Chemical Romance	Reprise	
16 April	"Sing"	My Chemical Romance	Reprise	
23 April	"Sing"	My Chemical Romance	Reprise	
30 April	"Sing"	My Chemical Romance	Reprise	
7 May	"Sing"	My Chemical Romance	Reprise	
14 May	"Not Ready to Die"	Avenged Sevenfold	Warner Bros.	
21 May	"Iris"	Goo Goo Dolls	Warner Bros.	
28 May	"Best of You"	Foo Fighters	RCA	
4 June	"Tribute"	Tenacious D	Sony	
11 June	"Bring Me to Life"	Evanescence	Epic	
18 June	"Bring Me to Life"	Evanescence	Epic	
25 June	"Walk"	Foo Fighters	RCA	
2 July	"Walk"	Foo Fighters	RCA	
9 July	"Walk"	Foo Fighters	RCA	
16 July	"Rolling in the Deep" (live)	Linkin Park	Warner Bros.	
23 July	"Bring Me to Life"	Evanescence	Epic	
30 July	"Bring Me to Life"	Evanescence	Epic	
6 August	"Bring Me to Life"	Evanescence	Epic	
13 August	"Best of You"	Foo Fighters	RCA	
20 August	"Ace of Spades"	Motörhead	Castle	
27 August	"My Immortal"	Evanescence	Virgin/Wind-up	
3 September	"What You Want"	Evanescence	Virgin/Wind-up	
10 September	"My Immortal"	Evanescence	Virgin/Wind-up	
17 September	"Arlandria"	Foo Fighters	RCA	
24 September	"Arlandria"	Foo Fighters	RCA	
1 October	"Sssnakepit"	Enter Shikari	Ambush Reality	
8 October	"Iris"	Goo Goo Dolls	Warner Bros.	
15 October	"Iris"	Goo Goo Dolls	Warner Bros.	
22 October	"Iris"	Goo Goo Dolls	Warner Bros.	
29 October	"Iris"	Goo Goo Dolls	Warner Bros.	
5 November	"Iris"	Goo Goo Dolls	Warner Bros.	
12 November	"Iris"	Goo Goo Dolls	Warner Bros.	
19 November	"Iris"	Goo Goo Dolls	Warner Bros.	
26 November	"Iris"	Goo Goo Dolls	Warner Bros.	
3 December	"When We Stand Together"	Nickelback	Roadrunner	
10 December	"When We Stand Together"	Nickelback	Roadrunner	
17 December	"When We Stand Together"	Nickelback	Roadrunner	
24 December	"Iris"	Goo Goo Dolls	Warner Bros.	
31 December	"Christmas Time (Don't Let the Bells End)"	The Darkness	Must Destroy	

== See also ==
- 2011 in British music
- List of UK Rock & Metal Albums Chart number ones of 2011
