= List of UK Jazz & Blues Albums Chart number ones of 2025 =

The UK Jazz & Blues Albums Chart is a record chart which ranks the best-selling jazz and blues albums in the United Kingdom. Compiled and published by the Official Charts Company, the data is based on each album's weekly physical sales, digital downloads and streams. As of the chart published 11 April 2025, 15 charts have been published with five albums at number one. The first number-one album of the year was Dance, No One's Watching by Ezra Collective, which spent the first four weeks of the year at number one.

== Chart history ==
Issue date	Album	Artist(s)	Record label(s)	Ref.
3 January	Dance, No One's Watching	Ezra Collective	Partisan	
10 January	Dance, No One's Watching	Ezra Collective	Partisan	
17 January	Dance, No One's Watching	Ezra Collective	Partisan	
24 January	Dance, No One's Watching	Ezra Collective	Partisan	
31 January	Meanwhile	Eric Clapton	Surfdog	
7 February	Meanwhile	Eric Clapton	Surfdog	
14 February	The Invisible Bluesman	Andy Fairweather Low	The Last Music Company	
21 February	Cowboys in Pinstriped Suits	Black Eyed Sons	Off Yer Rocka	
28 February	Dance, No One's Watching	Ezra Collective	Partisan	
7 March	Dance, No One's Watching	Ezra Collective	Partisan	
14 March	Dance, No One's Watching	Ezra Collective	Partisan	
21 March	Dance, No One's Watching	Ezra Collective	Partisan	
28 March	Dance, No One's Watching	Ezra Collective	Partisan	
4 April	Dance, No One's Watching	Ezra Collective	Partisan	
11 April	The Fork	Oscar Jerome	New Soil	

== See also ==
- 2025 in British music
