= List of UK Jazz & Blues Albums Chart number ones of 2002 =

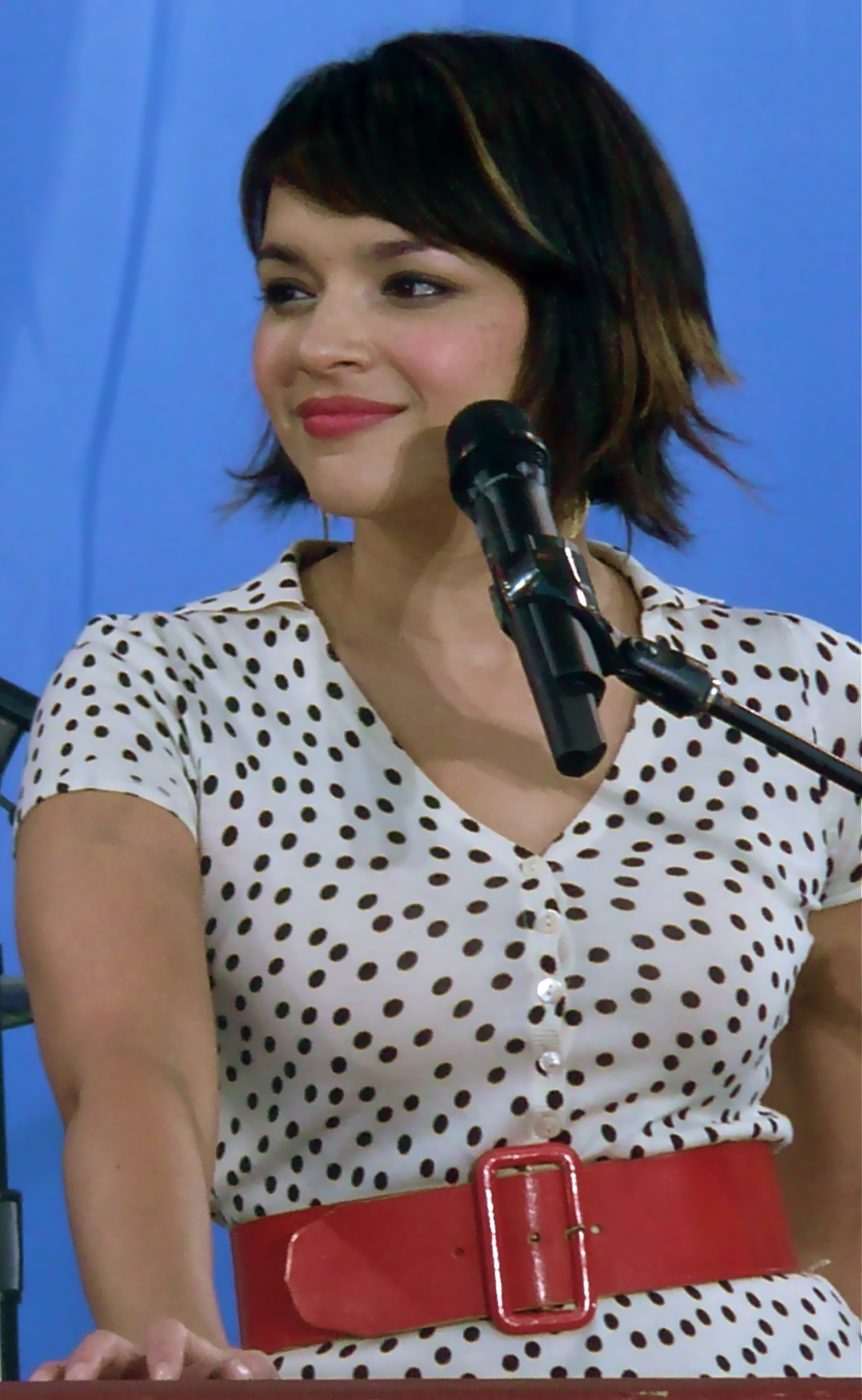
Norah Jones spent a record 36 weeks at number one on the UK Jazz & Blues Albums Chart in 2002 with her debut album Come Away with Me, including a run of 23 consecutive weeks from July to December.

The UK Jazz & Blues Albums Chart is a record chart which ranks the best-selling jazz and blues albums in the United Kingdom. Compiled and published by the Official Charts Company, the data is based on each album's weekly physical sales, digital downloads and streams. In 2002, 52 charts were published with seven albums at number one. The first number-one album of the year was The Look of Love, the sixth studio album by Diana Krall, which spent the first three weeks of the year at number one. The last number one of the year was Come Away with Me, the debut album by singer-songwriter Norah Jones, which spent 23 consecutive weeks atop the chart from July to the end of 2002.

The most successful album on the UK Jazz & Blues Albums Chart in 2002 was Come Away with Me, which spent a total of 36 weeks at number one over three spells. St Germain's third studio album Tourist was number one for seven weeks over the course of the year, including a run of five consecutive weeks during March and April. The Look of Love by Diana Krall was number one for four weeks over two spells, while the Jazz FM various artists compilation Dreamin' was the only other release to spend more than a single week at number one on the UK Jazz & Blues Albums Chart during 2002. Come Away with Me finished 2002 as the 11th best-selling album of the year in the UK.

== Chart history ==
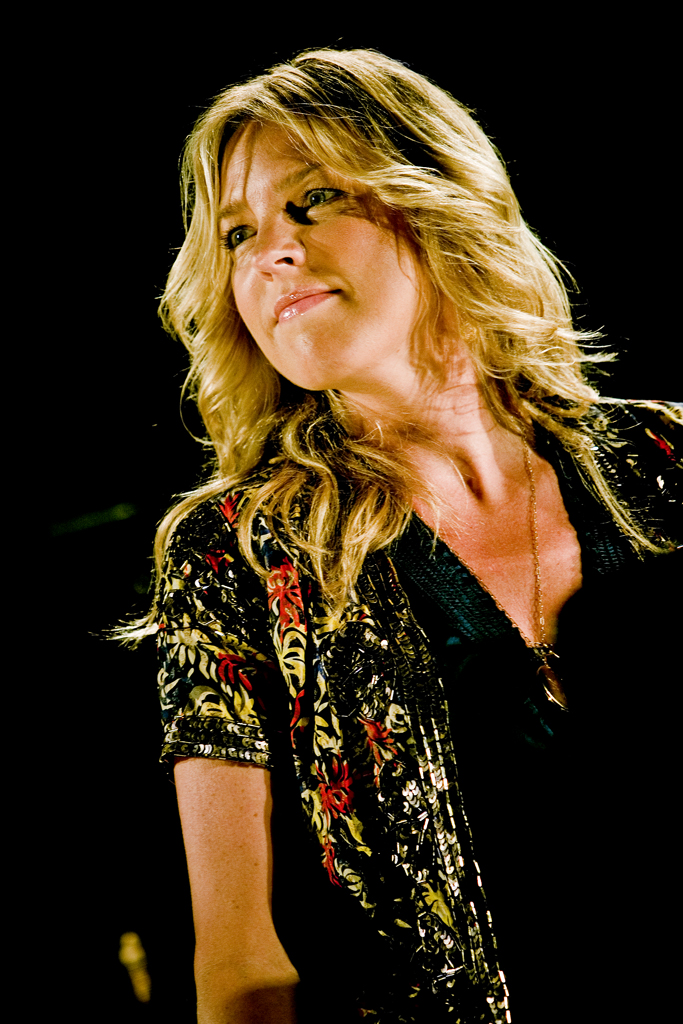
Diana Krall spent the first three weeks of 2002, plus another in February, at number one on the UK Jazz & Blues Albums Chart with her sixth studio album The Look of Love.

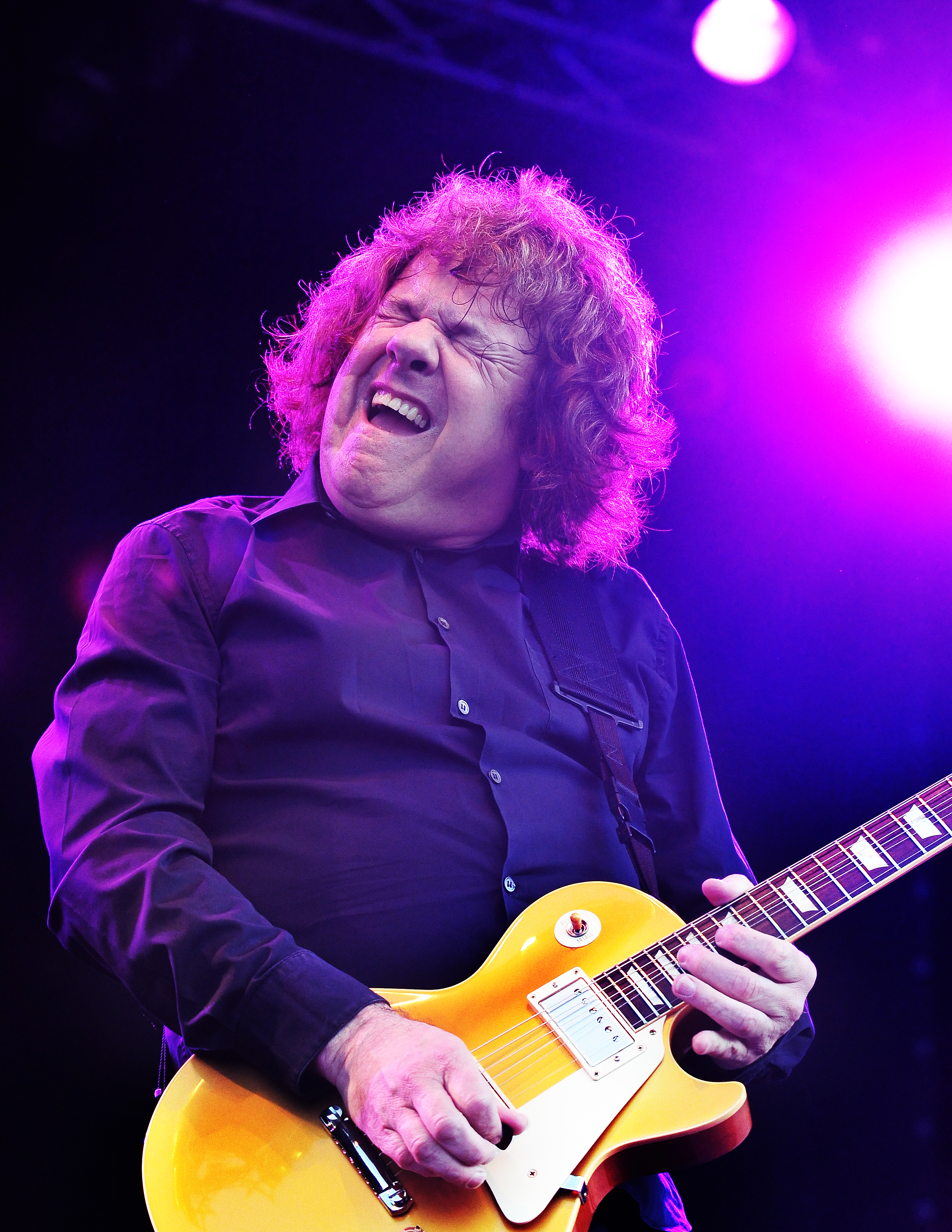
Guitarist Gary Moore reached number one in February with the greatest hits collection The Best of the Blues.

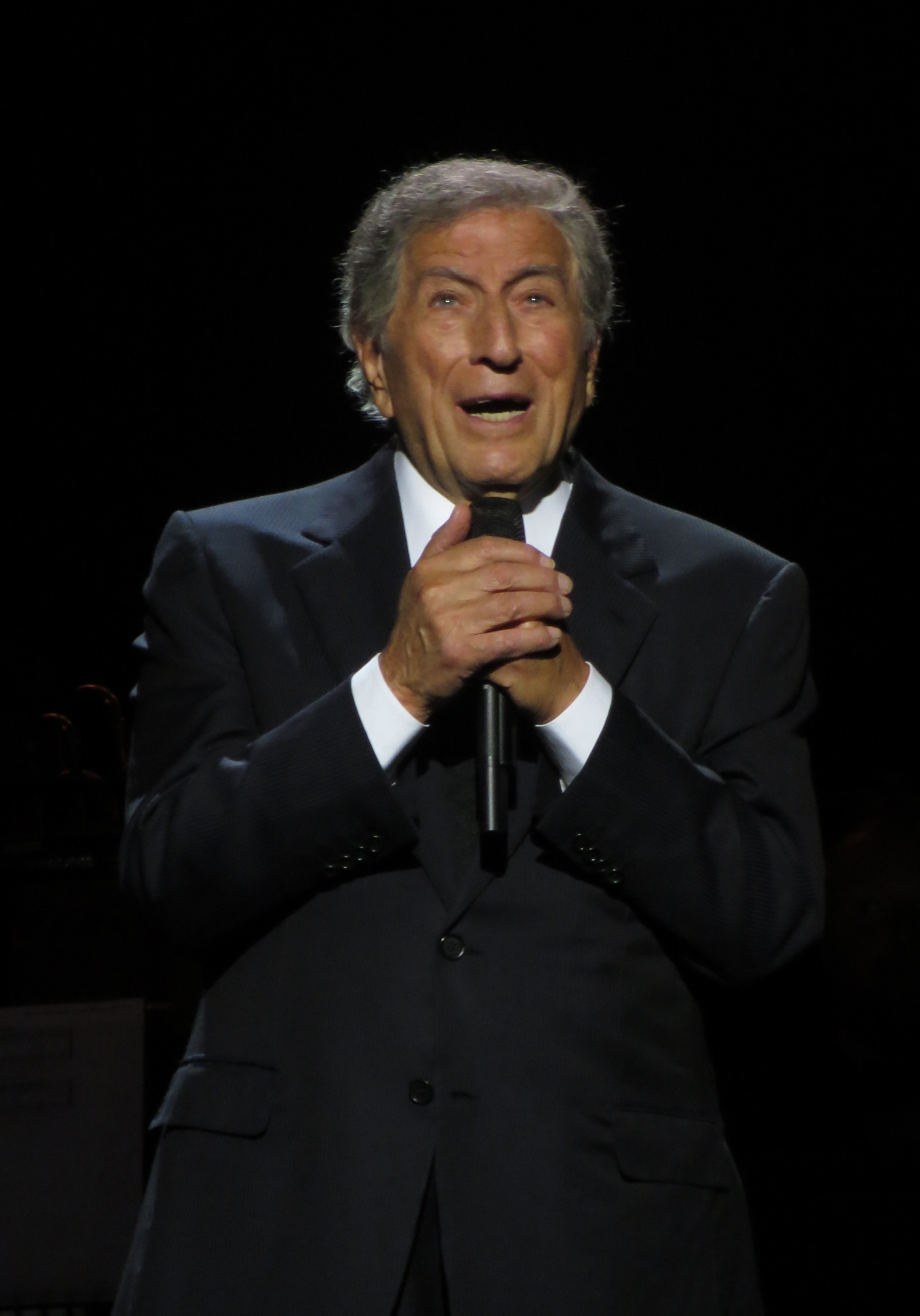
Playin' with My Friends: Bennett Sings the Blues by Tony Bennett returned to the top of the chart for a week in April 2002.

Key
†	Indicates best-selling jazz/blues album of 2002

Issue date	Album	Artist(s)	Record label(s)	Ref.
6 January	The Look of Love	Diana Krall	Verve	
13 January	The Look of Love	Diana Krall	Verve	
20 January	The Look of Love	Diana Krall	Verve	
27 January	Tourist	St Germain	Blue Note	
3 February	Tourist	St Germain	Blue Note	
10 February	The Best of the Blues	Gary Moore	Virgin	
17 February	The Look of Love	Diana Krall	Verve	
24 February	Dreamin'	various artists	Jazz FM	
3 March	Dreamin'	various artists	Jazz FM	
10 March	Come Away with Me †	Norah Jones	Parlophone	
17 March	Come Away with Me †	Norah Jones	Parlophone	
24 March	Tourist	St Germain	Blue Note	
31 March	Tourist	St Germain	Blue Note	
7 April	Tourist	St Germain	Blue Note	
14 April	Tourist	St Germain	Blue Note	
21 April	Tourist	St Germain	Blue Note	
28 April	Playin' with My Friends: Bennett Sings the Blues	Tony Bennett	Columbia	
5 May	Come Away with Me †	Norah Jones	Parlophone	
12 May	Come Away with Me †	Norah Jones	Parlophone	
19 May	Come Away with Me †	Norah Jones	Parlophone	
26 May	Come Away with Me †	Norah Jones	Parlophone	
2 June	Come Away with Me †	Norah Jones	Parlophone	
9 June	Come Away with Me †	Norah Jones	Parlophone	
16 June	Come Away with Me †	Norah Jones	Parlophone	
23 June	Come Away with Me †	Norah Jones	Parlophone	
30 June	Come Away with Me †	Norah Jones	Parlophone	
7 July	Come Away with Me †	Norah Jones	Parlophone	
14 July	Come Away with Me †	Norah Jones	Parlophone	
21 July	The Very Best of Smooth Jazz	various artists	Jazz FM	
28 July	Come Away with Me †	Norah Jones	Parlophone	
4 August	Come Away with Me †	Norah Jones	Parlophone	
11 August	Come Away with Me †	Norah Jones	Parlophone	
18 August	Come Away with Me †	Norah Jones	Parlophone	
25 August	Come Away with Me †	Norah Jones	Parlophone	
1 September	Come Away with Me †	Norah Jones	Parlophone	
8 September	Come Away with Me †	Norah Jones	Parlophone	
15 September	Come Away with Me †	Norah Jones	Parlophone	
22 September	Come Away with Me †	Norah Jones	Parlophone	
29 September	Come Away with Me †	Norah Jones	Parlophone	
6 October	Come Away with Me †	Norah Jones	Parlophone	
13 October	Come Away with Me †	Norah Jones	Parlophone	
20 October	Come Away with Me †	Norah Jones	Parlophone	
27 October	Come Away with Me †	Norah Jones	Parlophone	
3 November	Come Away with Me †	Norah Jones	Parlophone	
10 November	Come Away with Me †	Norah Jones	Parlophone	
17 November	Come Away with Me †	Norah Jones	Parlophone	
24 November	Come Away with Me †	Norah Jones	Parlophone	
1 December	Come Away with Me †	Norah Jones	Parlophone	
8 December	Come Away with Me †	Norah Jones	Parlophone	
15 December	Come Away with Me †	Norah Jones	Parlophone	
22 December	Come Away with Me †	Norah Jones	Parlophone	
29 December	Come Away with Me †	Norah Jones	Parlophone	

== See also ==
- 2002 in British music
