= List of UK Jazz & Blues Albums Chart number ones of 2007 =

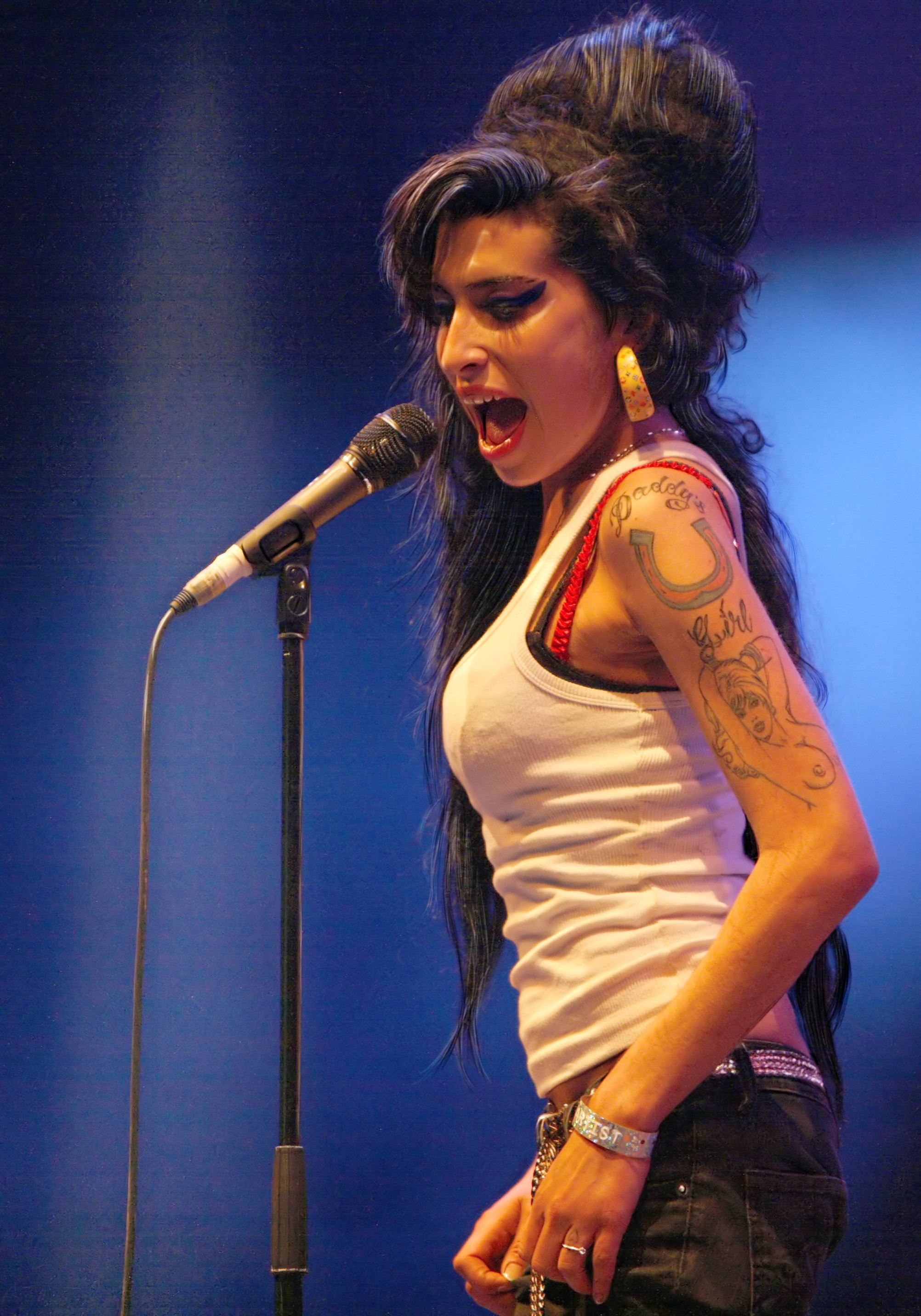
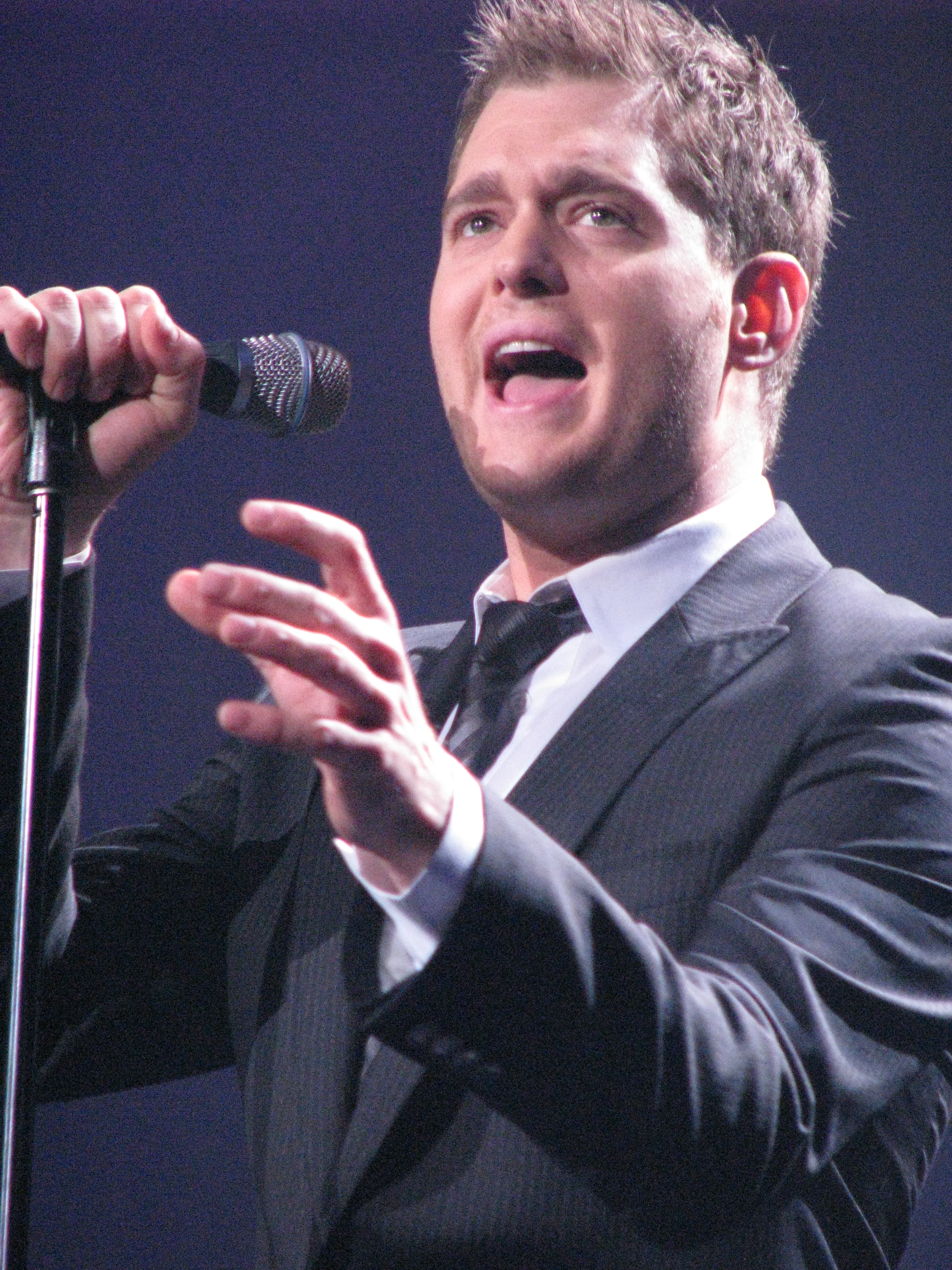
Amy Winehouse (top) and Michael Bublé (bottom) each spent 18 weeks at number one on the UK Jazz & Blues Albums Chart in 2007, with the albums Frank and Call Me Irresponsible, respectively.

The UK Jazz & Blues Albums Chart is a record chart which ranks the best-selling jazz and blues albums in the United Kingdom. Compiled and published by the Official Charts Company, the data is based on each album's weekly physical sales, digital downloads and streams. In 2007, 52 charts were published with seven albums at number one. Frank, the debut album by Amy Winehouse, was the first number-one album of the year, having reached the top spot for the first time in the last week of 2006. Michael Bublé's fifth album Call Me Irresponsible was the last number-one album of the year, spending the last two months of the year atop the chart.

Frank and Call Me Irresponsible were the most successful albums on the UK Jazz & Blues Albums Chart in 2007 – they each spent 18 weeks at number one, with the former's longest run of 12 weeks and the latter spending two spells of eight weeks each. Norah Jones spent seven weeks atop the chart in 2007 with her third release, Not Too Late. Madeline Peyroux also spent another three weeks atop the chart with her fourth studio album, Half the Perfect World, which was matched by the various artists compilation The Very Best of Latin Jazz. Call Me Irresponsible finished 2007 as the 18th and 66th best-selling albums of the year in the UK.

== Chart history ==
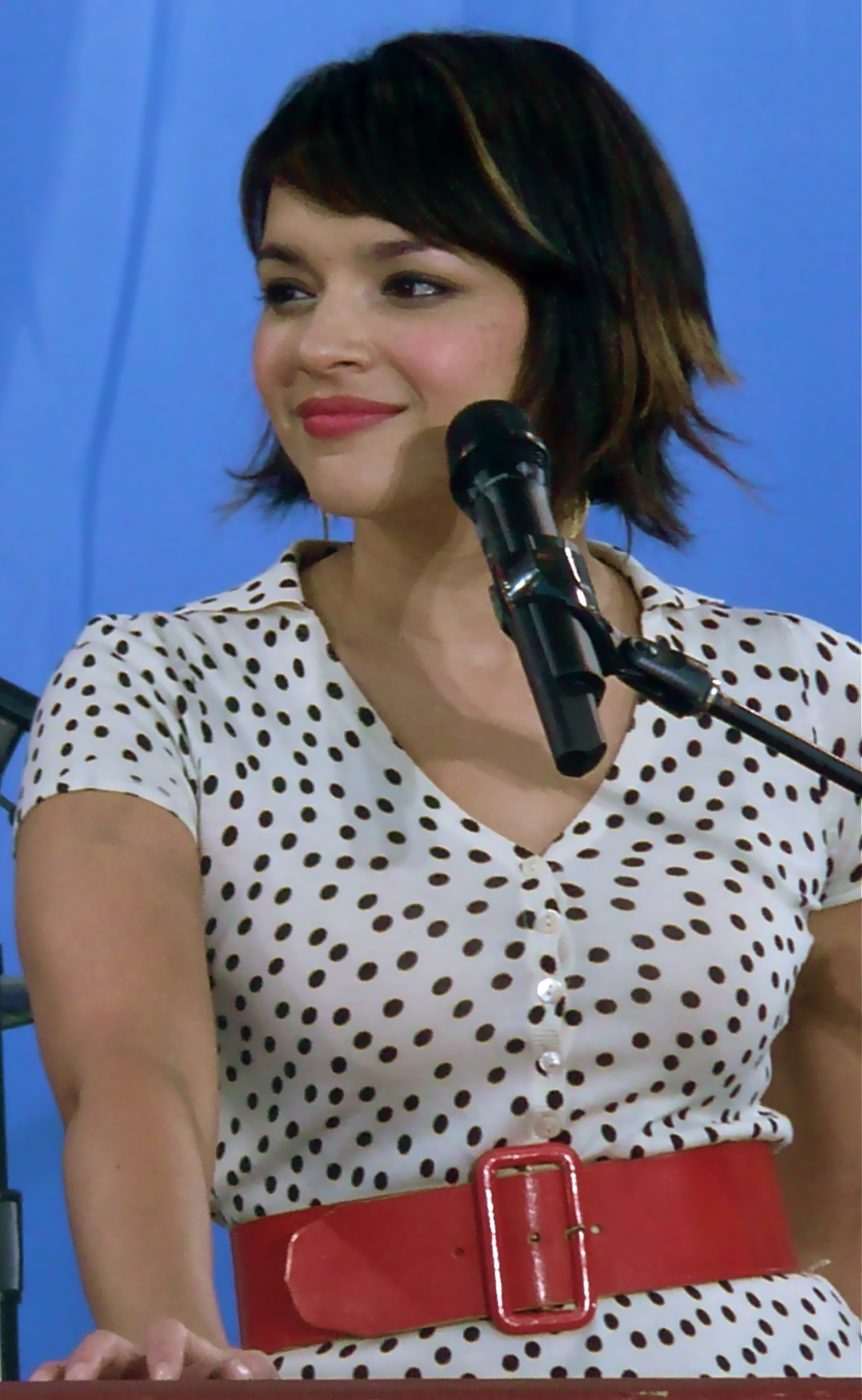
After her first two albums had also reached number one, Norah Jones spent seven weeks atop the UK Jazz & Blues Albums Chart with Not Too Late.

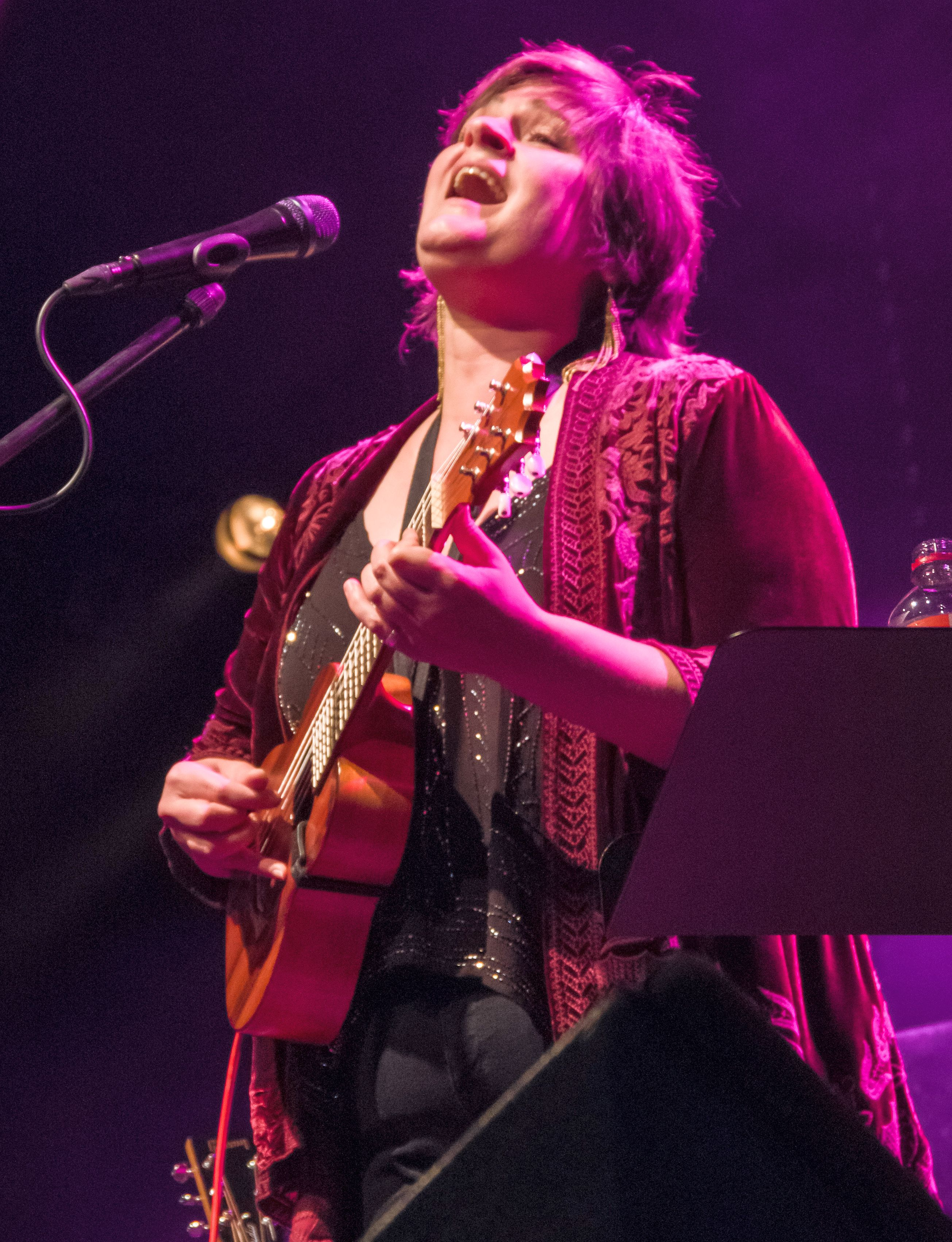
Madeline Peyroux spent another three weeks at number one in 2007 with her fourth album, Half the Perfect World.

Key
†	Indicates best-selling jazz/blues album of 2007

Issue date	Album	Artist(s)	Record label(s)	Ref.
7 January	Frank	Amy Winehouse	Island	
14 January	Half the Perfect World	Madeleine Peyroux	Rounder	
21 January	Half the Perfect World	Madeleine Peyroux	Rounder	
28 January	Half the Perfect World	Madeleine Peyroux	Rounder	
4 February	Not Too Late	Norah Jones	Blue Note	
11 February	Not Too Late	Norah Jones	Blue Note	
18 February	Not Too Late	Norah Jones	Blue Note	
25 February	Not Too Late	Norah Jones	Blue Note	
4 March	Frank	Amy Winehouse	Island	
11 March	Not Too Late	Norah Jones	Blue Note	
18 March	Not Too Late	Norah Jones	Blue Note	
25 March	Not Too Late	Norah Jones	Blue Note	
1 April	Frank	Amy Winehouse	Island	
8 April	Frank	Amy Winehouse	Island	
15 April	Frank	Amy Winehouse	Island	
22 April	Frank	Amy Winehouse	Island	
29 April	Forever Ella	Ella Fitzgerald	UCJ	
6 May	Call Me Irresponsible †	Michael Bublé	Reprise	
13 May	Call Me Irresponsible †	Michael Bublé	Reprise	
20 May	Call Me Irresponsible †	Michael Bublé	Reprise	
27 May	Call Me Irresponsible †	Michael Bublé	Reprise	
3 June	Call Me Irresponsible †	Michael Bublé	Reprise	
10 June	Call Me Irresponsible †	Michael Bublé	Reprise	
17 June	Call Me Irresponsible †	Michael Bublé	Reprise	
24 June	Call Me Irresponsible †	Michael Bublé	Reprise	
1 July	The Very Best of Latin Jazz	various artists	Global Television	
8 July	The Very Best of Latin Jazz	various artists	Global Television	
15 July	The Very Best of Latin Jazz	various artists	Global Television	
22 July	Frank	Amy Winehouse	Island	
29 July	Frank	Amy Winehouse	Island	
5 August	Frank	Amy Winehouse	Island	
12 August	Frank	Amy Winehouse	Island	
19 August	Frank	Amy Winehouse	Island	
26 August	Frank	Amy Winehouse	Island	
2 September	Frank	Amy Winehouse	Island	
9 September	Frank	Amy Winehouse	Island	
16 September	Frank	Amy Winehouse	Island	
23 September	Frank	Amy Winehouse	Island	
30 September	Frank	Amy Winehouse	Island	
7 October	Frank	Amy Winehouse	Island	
14 October	Call Me Irresponsible †	Michael Bublé	Reprise	
21 October	Classic Songs, My Way	Paul Anka	UMTV	
28 October	Classic Songs, My Way	Paul Anka	UMTV	
4 November	Call Me Irresponsible †	Michael Bublé	Reprise	
11 November	Call Me Irresponsible †	Michael Bublé	Reprise	
18 November	Call Me Irresponsible †	Michael Bublé	Reprise	
25 November	Call Me Irresponsible †	Michael Bublé	Reprise	
2 December	Call Me Irresponsible †	Michael Bublé	Reprise	
9 December	Call Me Irresponsible †	Michael Bublé	Reprise	
16 December	Call Me Irresponsible †	Michael Bublé	Reprise	
23 December	Call Me Irresponsible †	Michael Bublé	Reprise	
30 December	Call Me Irresponsible †	Michael Bublé	Reprise	

== See also ==
- 2007 in British music
