= List of UK Jazz & Blues Albums Chart number ones of 1997 =

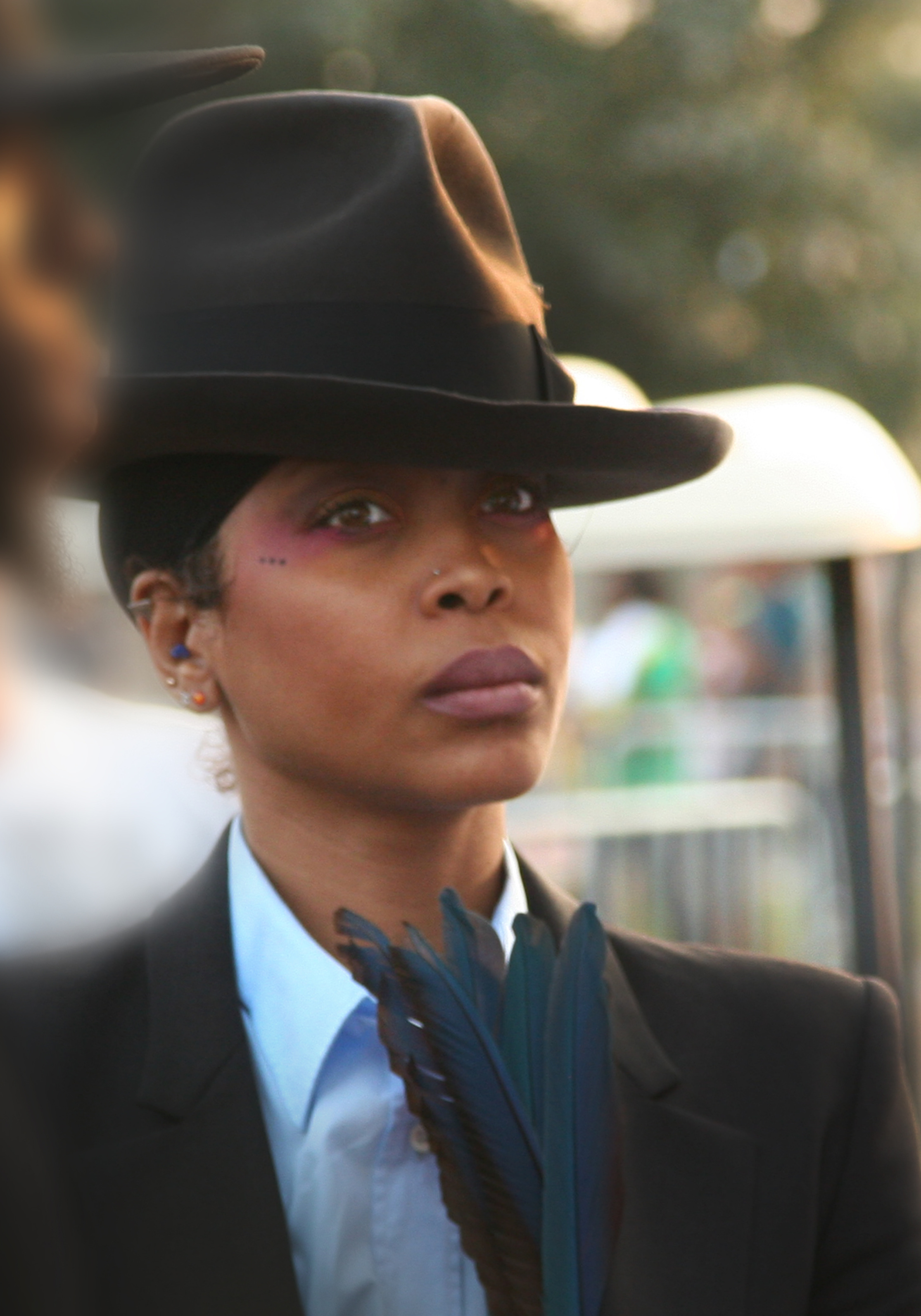
Erykah Badu spent a new record of 29 weeks at number one on the UK Jazz & Blues Albums Chart in 1997 with her debut album, Baduizm. This total also included a then-record spell of 25 consecutive weeks from March to August.

The UK Jazz & Blues Albums Chart is a record chart which ranks the best-selling jazz and blues albums in the United Kingdom. Compiled and published by the Official Charts Company, the data is based on each album's weekly physical sales, digital downloads and streams. In 1997, 52 charts were published with ten albums at number one. The first number-one album of the year was Kenny G's tenth studio album The Moment, which spent the first two weeks of the year atop the chart, at the end of a 12-week run starting the previous October. Kenny G also had the last number-one album of the year, spending four weeks atop the chart with Greatest Hits.

The most successful album on the UK Jazz & Blues Albums Chart in 1997 was Baduizm, the debut album by Erykah Badu, which spent a total of 29 weeks at number one. The PolyGram various artists compilation The No. 1 Jazz Album spent seven weeks at number one between 14 September and 1 November, while Kenny G spent a total of six non-consecutive weeks atop the chart with The Moment (two weeks) and Greatest Hits (four weeks). Releases from the Pat Metheny Group, Nuyorican Soul, Billie Holiday and B. B. King were each number one for two weeks. Baduizm finished 1997 as the 94th best-selling album of the year in the UK.

== Chart history ==
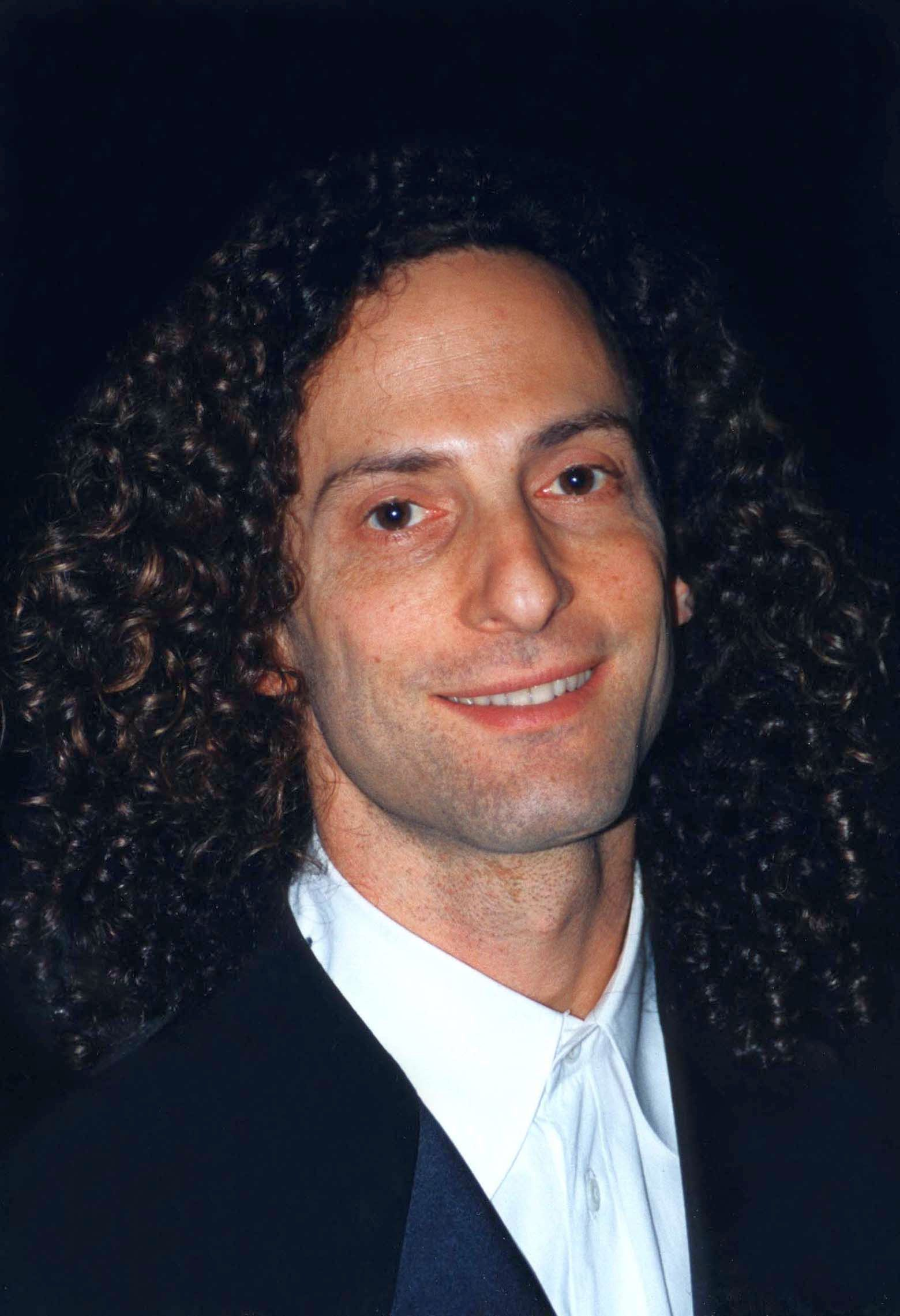
Kenny G spent six weeks atop the UK Jazz & Blues Albums Chart in 1997: the first two weeks of the year with studio album The Moment and the last four weeks of the year with compilation Greatest Hits.

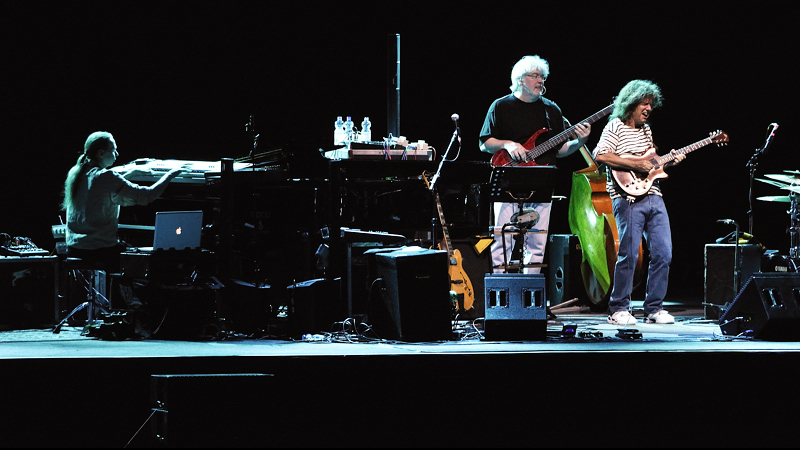
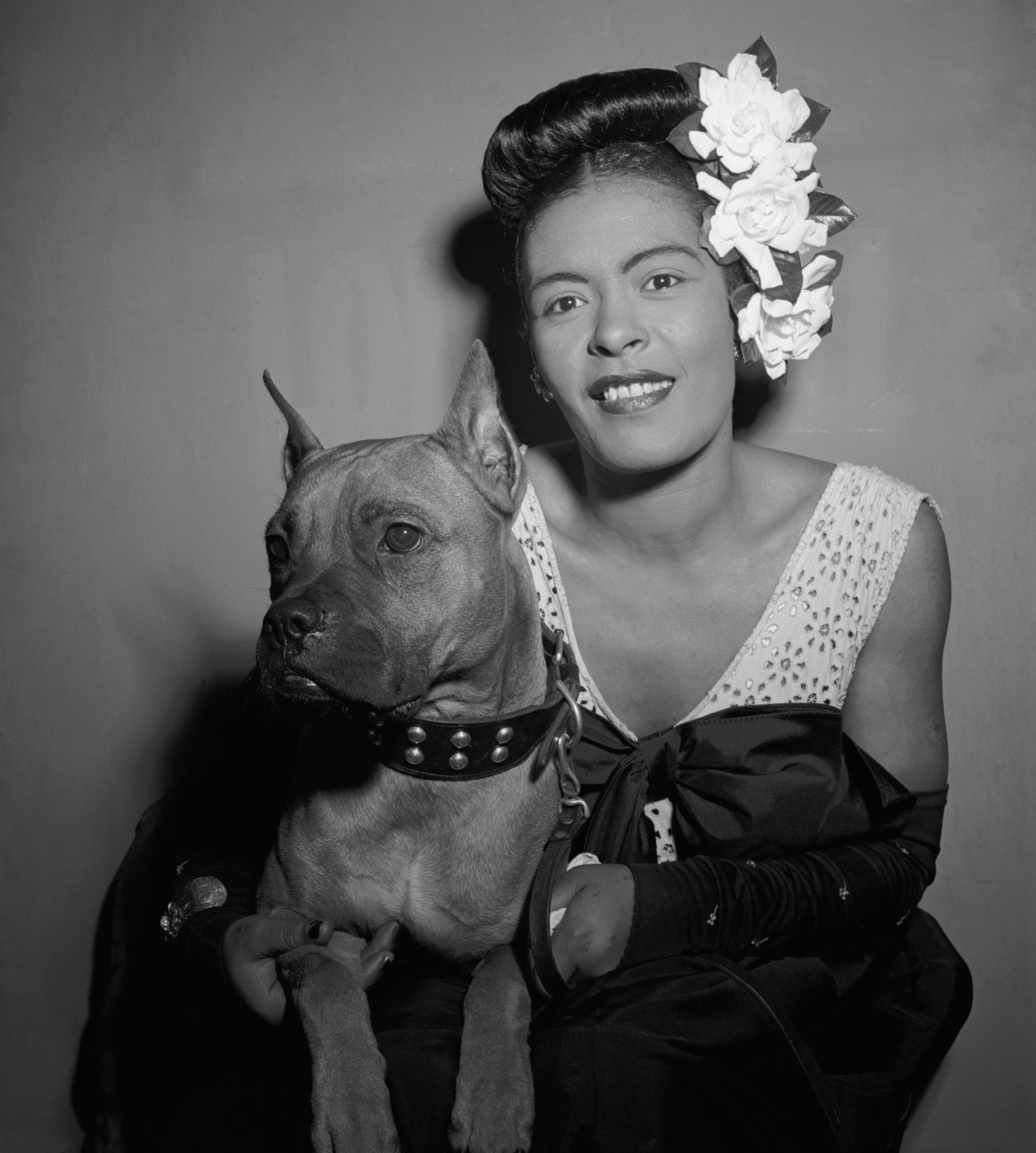
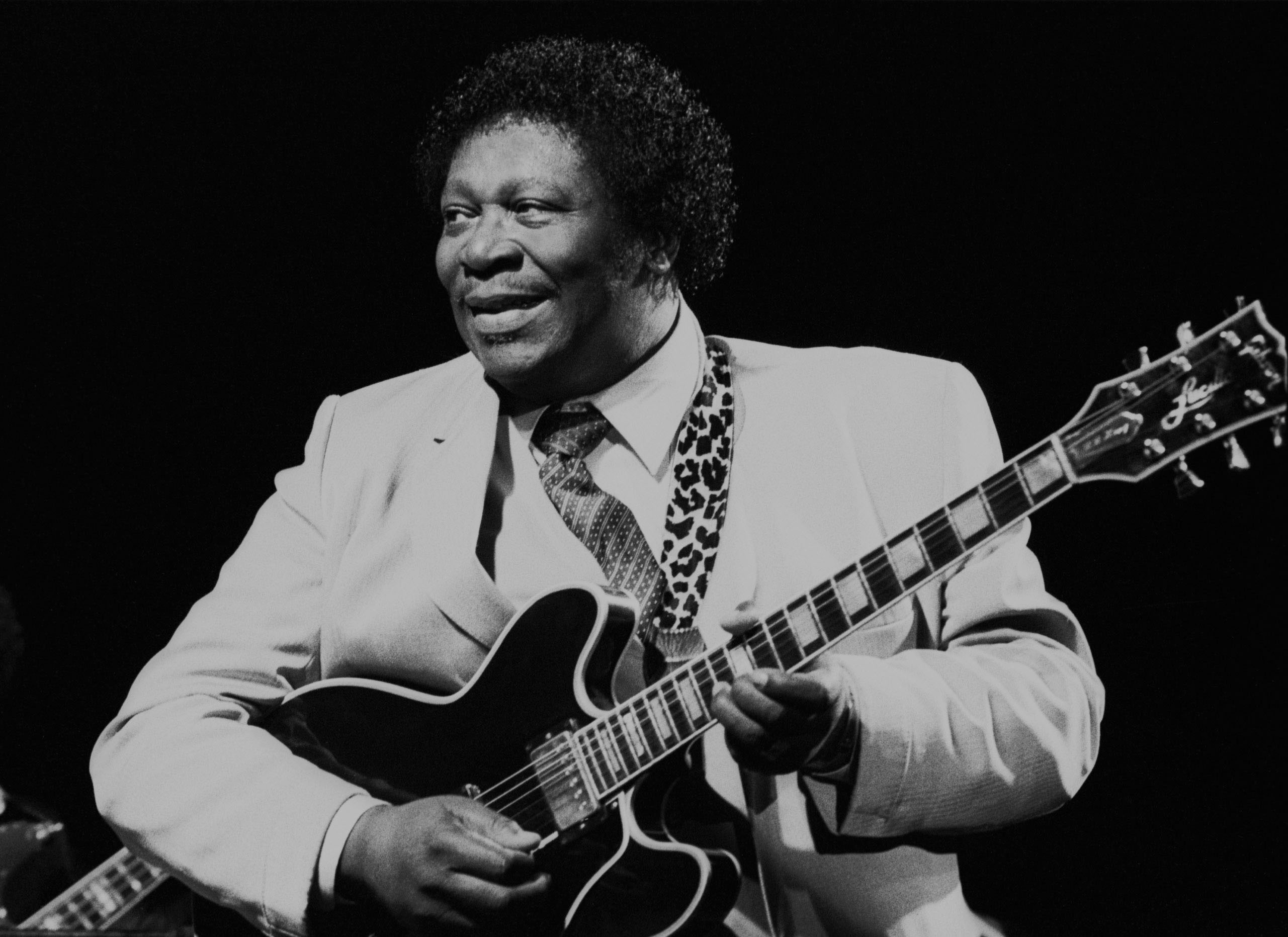
Quartet by the Pat Metheny Group (top), Lady Day: The Very Best of Billie Holiday by Billie Holiday (middle) and Deuces Wild by B. B. King (bottom) each spent two weeks at number one on the UK Jazz & Blues Albums Chart in 1997.

Key
†	Indicates best-selling jazz/blues album of 1997

Issue date	Album	Artist(s)	Record label(s)	Ref.
5 January	The Moment	Kenny G	Arista	
12 January	The Moment	Kenny G	Arista	
19 January	Quartet	Pat Metheny Group	Geffen	
26 January	Quartet	Pat Metheny Group	Geffen	
2 February	The Blues Album	various artists	Virgin	
9 February	Feeling Good: The Very Best of Nina Simone	Nina Simone	Verve/PolyGram	
16 February	Baduizm †	Erykah Badu	MCA	
23 February	Nuyorican Soul	Nuyorican Soul	Talkin' Loud	
2 March	Nuyorican Soul	Nuyorican Soul	Talkin' Loud	
9 March	Baduizm †	Erykah Badu	MCA	
16 March	Baduizm †	Erykah Badu	MCA	
23 March	Baduizm †	Erykah Badu	MCA	
30 March	Baduizm †	Erykah Badu	MCA	
6 April	Baduizm †	Erykah Badu	MCA	
13 April	Baduizm †	Erykah Badu	MCA	
20 April	Baduizm †	Erykah Badu	MCA	
27 April	Baduizm †	Erykah Badu	MCA	
4 May	Baduizm †	Erykah Badu	MCA	
11 May	Baduizm †	Erykah Badu	MCA	
18 May	Baduizm †	Erykah Badu	MCA	
25 May	Baduizm †	Erykah Badu	MCA	
1 June	Baduizm †	Erykah Badu	MCA	
8 June	Baduizm †	Erykah Badu	MCA	
15 June	Baduizm †	Erykah Badu	MCA	
22 June	Baduizm †	Erykah Badu	MCA	
29 June	Baduizm †	Erykah Badu	MCA	
6 July	Baduizm †	Erykah Badu	MCA	
13 July	Baduizm †	Erykah Badu	MCA	
20 July	Baduizm †	Erykah Badu	MCA	
27 July	Baduizm †	Erykah Badu	MCA	
3 August	Baduizm †	Erykah Badu	MCA	
10 August	Baduizm †	Erykah Badu	MCA	
17 August	Baduizm †	Erykah Badu	MCA	
24 August	Baduizm †	Erykah Badu	MCA	
31 August	Lady Day: The Very Best of Billie Holiday	Billie Holiday	Sony/Universal	
7 September	Lady Day: The Very Best of Billie Holiday	Billie Holiday	Sony/Universal	
14 September	The No. 1 Jazz Album	various artists	PolyGram	
21 September	The No. 1 Jazz Album	various artists	PolyGram	
28 September	The No. 1 Jazz Album	various artists	PolyGram	
5 October	The No. 1 Jazz Album	various artists	PolyGram	
12 October	The No. 1 Jazz Album	various artists	PolyGram	
19 October	The No. 1 Jazz Album	various artists	PolyGram	
26 October	The No. 1 Jazz Album	various artists	PolyGram	
2 November	Baduizm †	Erykah Badu	MCA	
9 November	Deuces Wild	B. B. King	Universal	
16 November	Deuces Wild	B. B. King	Universal	
23 November	Baduizm †	Erykah Badu	MCA	
30 November	Baduizm †	Erykah Badu	MCA	
7 December	Greatest Hits	Kenny G	Arista	
14 December	Greatest Hits	Kenny G	Arista	
21 December	Greatest Hits	Kenny G	Arista	
28 December	Greatest Hits	Kenny G	Arista	

== See also ==
- 1997 in British music
