= List of UK Jazz & Blues Albums Chart number ones of 2015 =

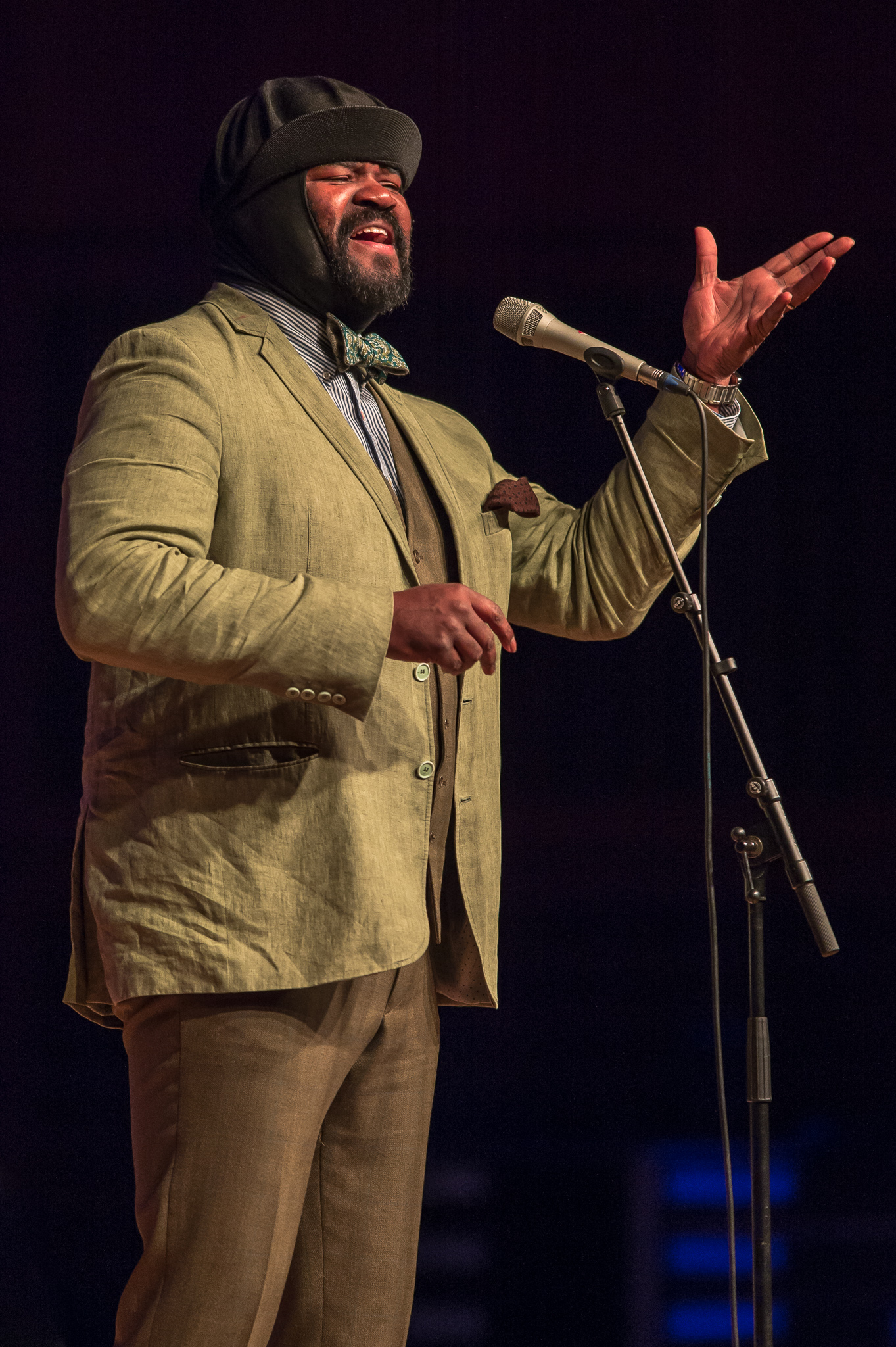
Gregory Porter's third album Liquid Spirit spent a total of 22 weeks atop the UK Jazz & Blues Albums Chart in 2015, including the first 12 weeks of the year.

The UK Jazz & Blues Albums Chart is a record chart which ranks the best-selling jazz and blues albums in the United Kingdom. Compiled and published by the Official Charts Company, the data is based on each album's weekly physical sales, digital downloads and streams. In 2015, 52 charts were published with six albums at number one. The first number-one album of the year was Gregory Porter's third album Liquid Spirit, which spent most of the first three months of the year atop the chart, completing a run of 15 consecutive weeks starting in December 2014. Liquid Spirit was also the last number-one album of the year, returning to the top spot for the final week of 2015.

The most successful album on the UK Jazz & Blues Albums Chart in 2015 was Liquid Spirit, which spent a total of 22 weeks at number one over seven separate spells, the longest of which was the first 12 weeks of the year. Seasick Steve's compilation Walkin' Man: The Best of Seasick Steve spent 11 weeks atop the chart, while the musician spent a further four weeks at number one with his seventh studio album, Sonic Soul Surfer. The self-titled debut album by Nathaniel Rateliff & the Night Sweats was number one for nine weeks, while The Very Best of Glenn Miller was number one for four weeks. Liquid Spirit finished 2015 as the 37th best-selling album of the year in the UK.

== Chart history ==
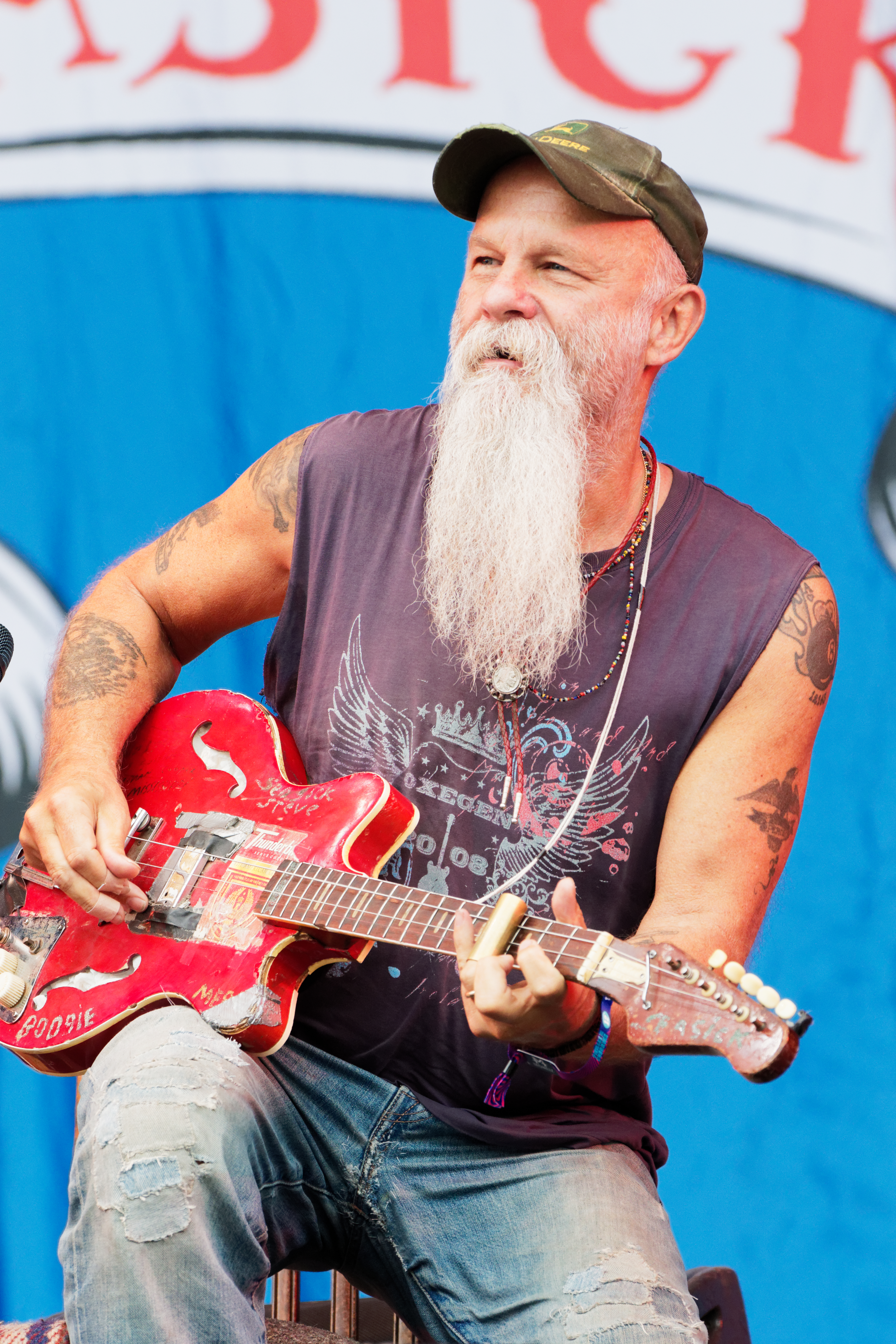
Seasick Steve spent a total of 15 weeks atop the chart in 2015 – 11 weeks with Walkin' Man: The Best of Seasick Steve and four with Sonic Soul Surfer.

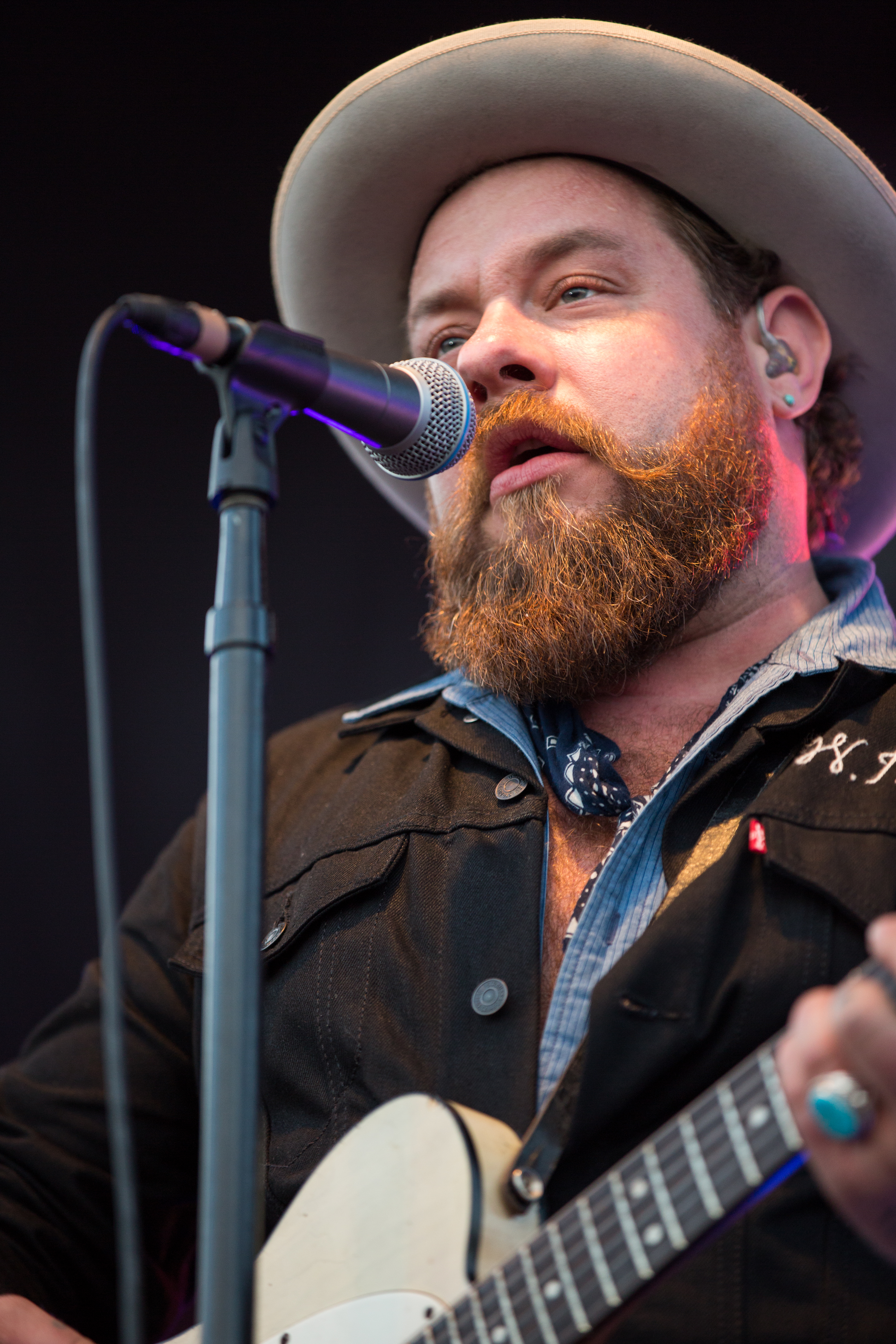
Nathaniel Rateliff spent nine weeks at number one with the first album credited to his band the Night Sweats, Nathaniel Rateliff & the Night Sweats.

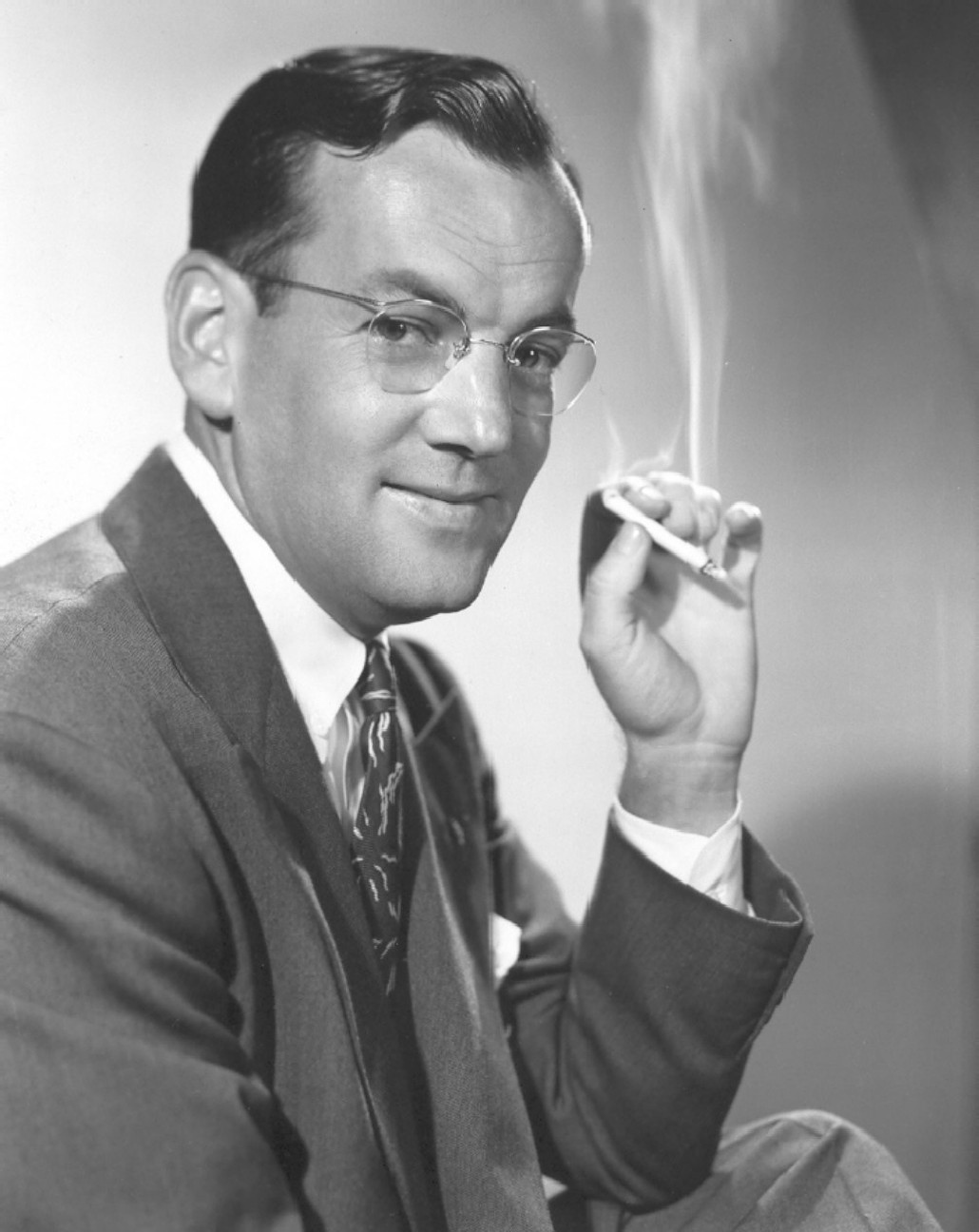
The Glenn Miller compilation The Very Best Of returned to the number-one spot for five weeks in the summer of 2015.

Key
†	Indicates best-selling jazz/blues album of 2015

Issue date	Album	Artist(s)	Record label(s)	Ref.
4 January	Liquid Spirit †	Gregory Porter	Blue Note	
11 January	Liquid Spirit †	Gregory Porter	Blue Note	
18 January	Liquid Spirit †	Gregory Porter	Blue Note	
25 January	Liquid Spirit †	Gregory Porter	Blue Note	
1 February	Liquid Spirit †	Gregory Porter	Blue Note	
8 February	Liquid Spirit †	Gregory Porter	Blue Note	
15 February	Liquid Spirit †	Gregory Porter	Blue Note	
22 February	Liquid Spirit †	Gregory Porter	Blue Note	
1 March	Liquid Spirit †	Gregory Porter	Blue Note	
8 March	Liquid Spirit †	Gregory Porter	Blue Note	
15 March	Liquid Spirit †	Gregory Porter	Blue Note	
22 March	Liquid Spirit †	Gregory Porter	Blue Note	
29 March	Sonic Soul Surfer	Seasick Steve	Caroline	
5 April	Sonic Soul Surfer	Seasick Steve	Caroline	
12 April	Sonic Soul Surfer	Seasick Steve	Caroline	
19 April	Sonic Soul Surfer	Seasick Steve	Caroline	
26 April	Walkin' Man: The Best of Seasick Steve	Seasick Steve	Rhino	
3 May	Walkin' Man: The Best of Seasick Steve	Seasick Steve	Rhino	
10 May	Walkin' Man: The Best of Seasick Steve	Seasick Steve	Rhino	
17 May	Liquid Spirit †	Gregory Porter	Blue Note	
24 May	Walkin' Man: The Best of Seasick Steve	Seasick Steve	Rhino	
31 May	Liquid Spirit †	Gregory Porter	Blue Note	
7 June	Liquid Spirit †	Gregory Porter	Blue Note	
14 June	The Very Best of Glenn Miller	Glenn Miller	Sony	
21 June	The Very Best of Glenn Miller	Glenn Miller	Sony	
28 June	The Very Best of Glenn Miller	Glenn Miller	Sony	
5 July	The Very Best of Glenn Miller	Glenn Miller	Sony	
10 July	The Very Best of Glenn Miller	Glenn Miller	Sony	
17 July	Liquid Spirit †	Gregory Porter	Blue Note	
24 July	Walkin' Man: The Best of Seasick Steve	Seasick Steve	Rhino	
31 July	Walkin' Man: The Best of Seasick Steve	Seasick Steve	Rhino	
7 August	Walkin' Man: The Best of Seasick Steve	Seasick Steve	Rhino	
14 August	Walkin' Man: The Best of Seasick Steve	Seasick Steve	Rhino	
21 August	Walkin' Man: The Best of Seasick Steve	Seasick Steve	Rhino	
28 August	Walkin' Man: The Best of Seasick Steve	Seasick Steve	Rhino	
4 September	Walkin' Man: The Best of Seasick Steve	Seasick Steve	Rhino	
11 September	Liquid Spirit †	Gregory Porter	Blue Note	
18 September	Liquid Spirit †	Gregory Porter	Blue Note	
25 September	Liquid Spirit †	Gregory Porter	Blue Note	
2 October	Nathaniel Rateliff & the Night Sweats	Nathaniel Rateliff & the Night Sweats	Concord	
9 October	Nathaniel Rateliff & the Night Sweats	Nathaniel Rateliff & the Night Sweats	Concord	
16 October	Nathaniel Rateliff & the Night Sweats	Nathaniel Rateliff & the Night Sweats	Concord	
23 October	Nathaniel Rateliff & the Night Sweats	Nathaniel Rateliff & the Night Sweats	Concord	
30 October	Battle Scars	Walter Trout	Provogue	
6 November	Nathaniel Rateliff & the Night Sweats	Nathaniel Rateliff & the Night Sweats	Concord	
13 November	Nathaniel Rateliff & the Night Sweats	Nathaniel Rateliff & the Night Sweats	Concord	
20 November	Nathaniel Rateliff & the Night Sweats	Nathaniel Rateliff & the Night Sweats	Concord	
27 November	Liquid Spirit †	Gregory Porter	Blue Note	
4 December	Liquid Spirit †	Gregory Porter	Blue Note	
11 December	Nathaniel Rateliff & the Night Sweats	Nathaniel Rateliff & the Night Sweats	Concord	
18 December	Nathaniel Rateliff & the Night Sweats	Nathaniel Rateliff & the Night Sweats	Concord	
25 December	Liquid Spirit †	Gregory Porter	Blue Note	

== See also ==
- 2015 in British music
