= List of UK Jazz & Blues Albums Chart number ones of 1996 =

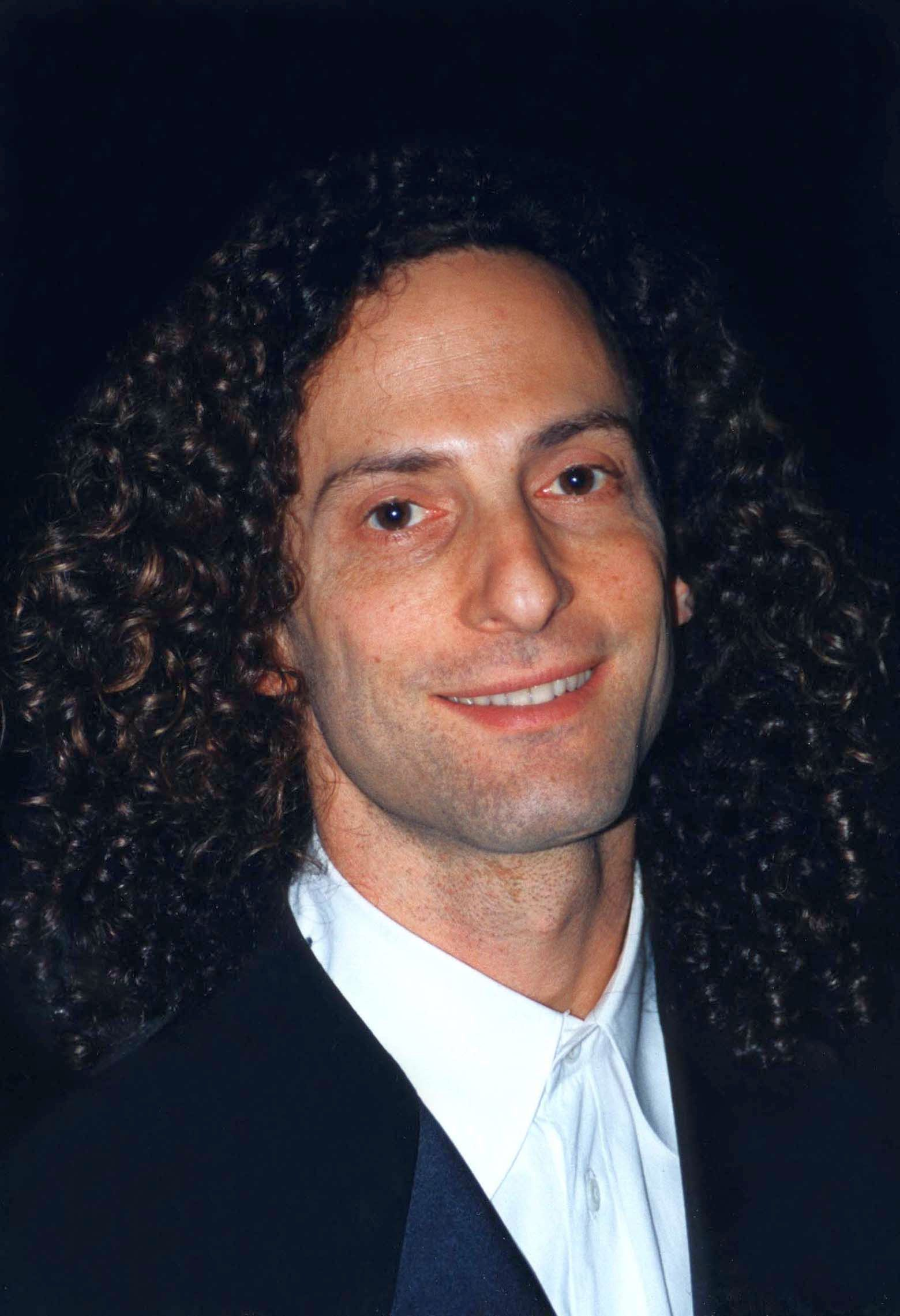
Kenny G's tenth studio album The Moment was the most successful album on the UK Jazz & Blues Albums Chart in 1996, spending the last 12 weeks of the year (and the first two of 1997) at number one.

The UK Jazz & Blues Albums Chart is a record chart which ranks the best-selling jazz and blues albums in the United Kingdom. Compiled and published by the Official Charts Company, the data is based on each album's weekly physical sales, digital downloads and streams. In 1996, 52 charts were published with 13 albums at number one. The first number-one album of the year was That's Jazz, a compilation of songs by various artists released by EMI, which spent the first three weeks of the year atop the chart. The last number-one of the year was Kenny G's tenth studio album The Moment, which topped the chart from 13 October until the end of the year – a period of 12 consecutive weeks.

The most successful album on the UK Jazz & Blues Albums Chart in 1996 was The Moment, which spent the last 12 weeks of the year at number one. American jazz singer Ella Fitzgerald, who died on 15 June 1996, was the most successful artist of the year on the UK Jazz & Blues Albums Chart, spending 13 combined weeks at number one with three different compilations: The Best of Ella Fitzgerald (one week), Forever Ella (seven weeks) and Essential Ella (five weeks). Jan Garbarek spent four consecutive weeks at number one with Visible World, while Courtney Pine and Sade were number one for three weeks each with Modern Day Jazz Stories and Diamond Life, respectively.

== Chart history ==
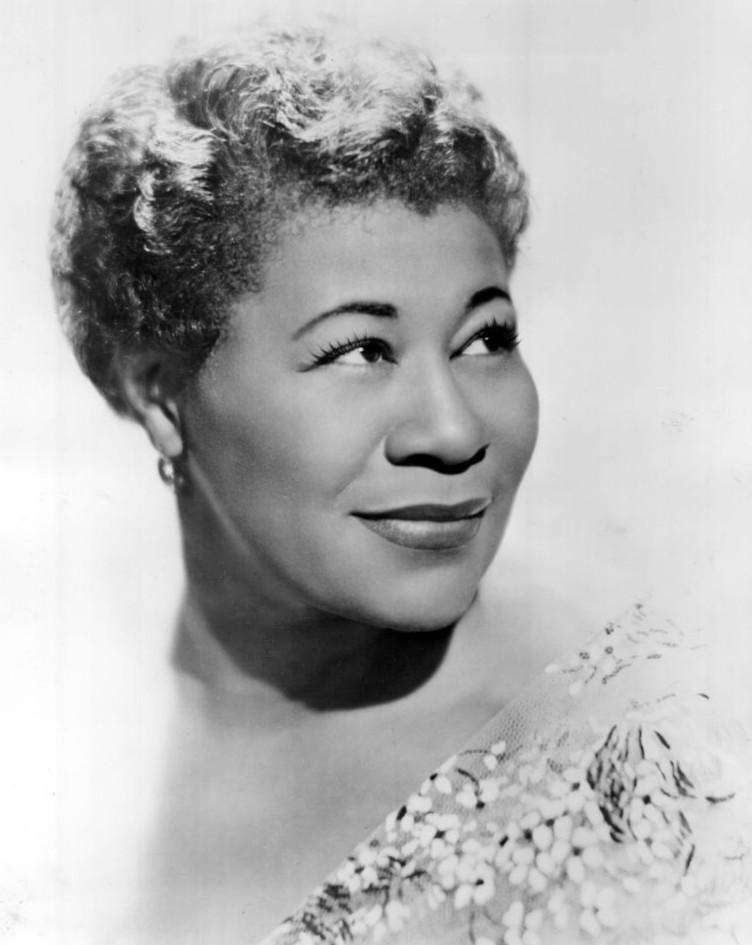
Ella Fitzgerald, who died in June, spent a total of 13 weeks at number one on the UK Jazz & Blues Albums Chart with three different greatest hits albums.

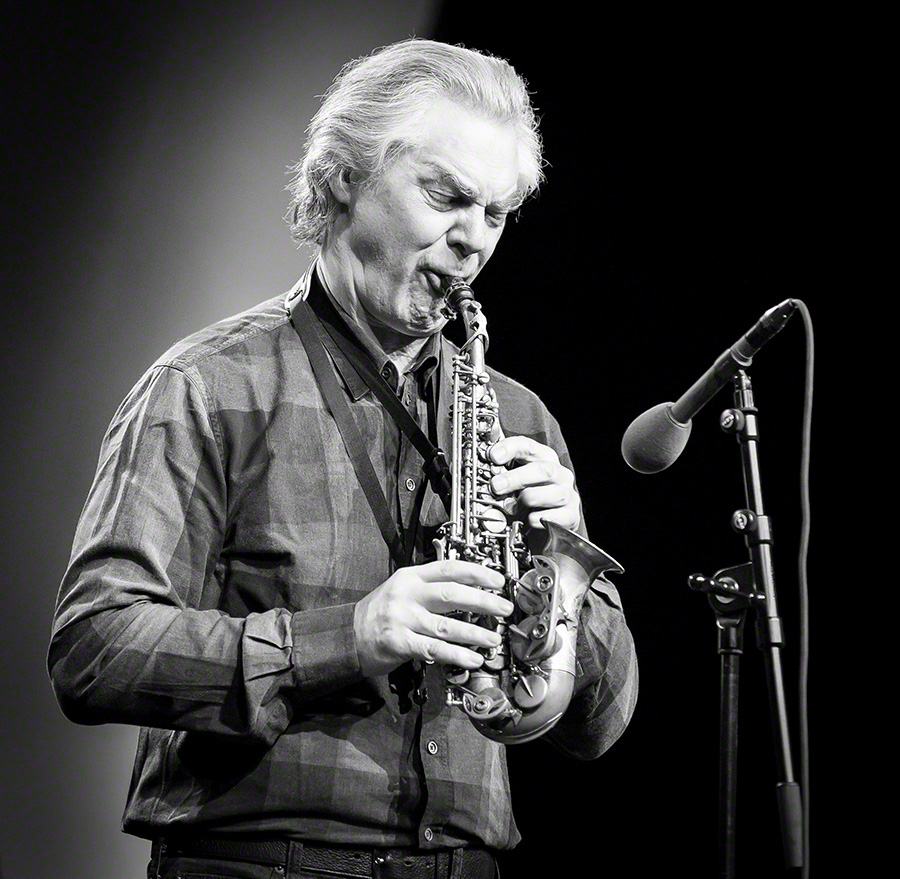
Visible World by Norwegian musician Jan Garbarek spent four consecutive weeks at number one during May 1996.

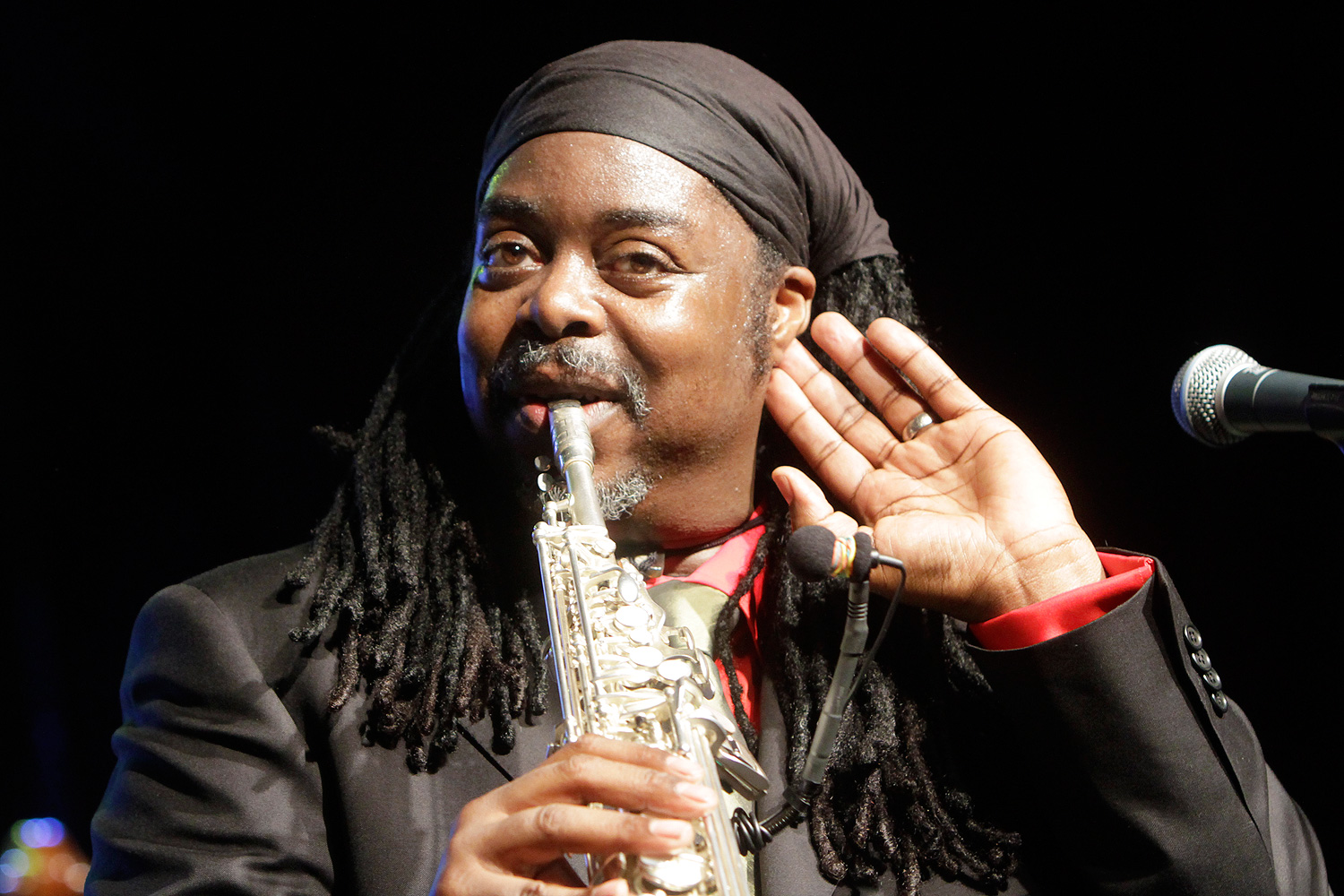
Courtney Pine was number one for three weeks in February 1996 with the album Modern Day Jazz Stories.

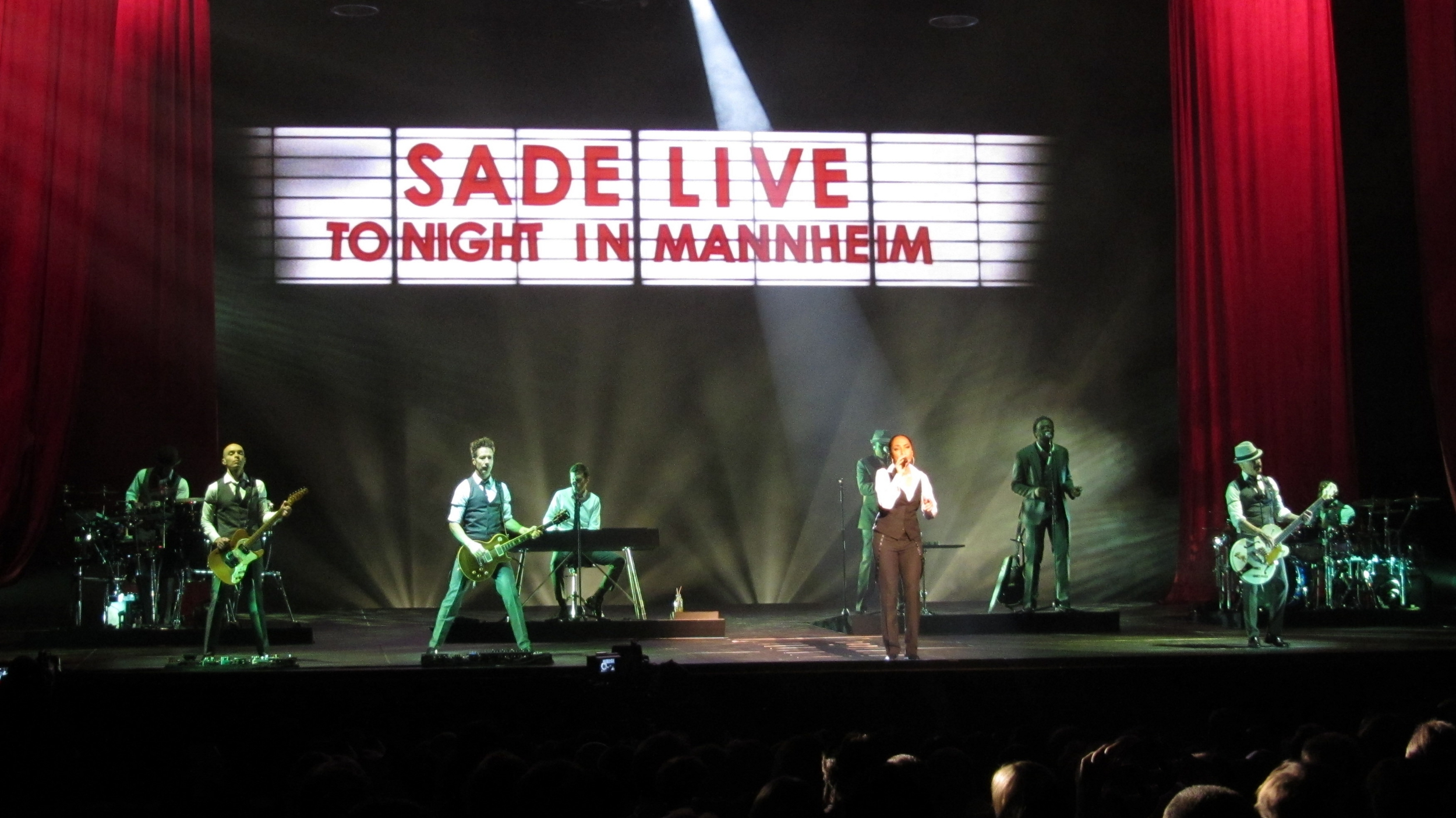
Soul band Sade spent three weeks at number one on the UK Jazz & Blues Albums Chart in 1995 with their 1984 debut album, Diamond Life.

Issue date	Album	Artist(s)	Record label(s)	Ref.
7 January	That's Jazz	various artists	EMI	
14 January	That's Jazz	various artists	EMI	
21 January	That's Jazz	various artists	EMI	
28 January	The Best of Ella Fitzgerald	Ella Fitzgerald	MCA	
4 February	Modern Day Jazz Stories	Courtney Pine	Talkin' Loud	
11 February	Modern Day Jazz Stories	Courtney Pine	Talkin' Loud	
18 February	Modern Day Jazz Stories	Courtney Pine	Talkin' Loud	
25 February	Diamond Life	Sade	Epic	
3 March	Diamond Life	Sade	Epic	
10 March	Diamond Life	Sade	Epic	
17 March	Forever Ella	Ella Fitzgerald	Verve/PolyGram	
24 March	Forever Ella	Ella Fitzgerald	Verve/PolyGram	
31 March	Forever Ella	Ella Fitzgerald	Verve/PolyGram	
7 April	Forever Ella	Ella Fitzgerald	Verve/PolyGram	
14 April	Forever Ella	Ella Fitzgerald	Verve/PolyGram	
21 April	Forever Ella	Ella Fitzgerald	Verve/PolyGram	
28 April	Forever Ella	Ella Fitzgerald	Verve/PolyGram	
5 May	Visible World	Jan Garbarek	ECM	
12 May	Visible World	Jan Garbarek	ECM	
19 May	Visible World	Jan Garbarek	ECM	
26 May	Visible World	Jan Garbarek	ECM	
2 June	Blues Alive	Gary Moore	Virgin	
9 June	Still Got the Blues	Gary Moore	Virgin	
16 June	Pure Jazz Moods	various artists	Dino	
23 June	Pure Jazz Moods	various artists	Dino	
30 June	Pure Jazz Moods	various artists	Dino	
7 July	Essential Ella	Ella Fitzgerald	Verve	
14 July	Essential Ella	Ella Fitzgerald	Verve	
21 July	Essential Ella	Ella Fitzgerald	Verve	
28 July	Essential Ella	Ella Fitzgerald	Verve	
4 August	Essential Ella	Ella Fitzgerald	Verve	
11 August	The Best Jazz... Ever!	various artists	Virgin	
18 August	The Best Jazz... Ever!	various artists	Virgin	
25 August	The Best Jazz... Ever!	various artists	Virgin	
1 September	The Best Jazz... Ever!	various artists	Virgin	
8 September	The Best Jazz... Ever!	various artists	Virgin	
15 September	The Best Jazz... Ever!	various artists	Virgin	
22 September	The Best Jazz... Ever!	various artists	Virgin	
29 September	The Very Best of Miles Davis	Miles Davis	Columbia	
6 October	The Very Best of Miles Davis	Miles Davis	Columbia	
13 October	The Moment	Kenny G	Arista	
20 October	The Moment	Kenny G	Arista	
27 October	The Moment	Kenny G	Arista	
3 November	The Moment	Kenny G	Arista	
10 November	The Moment	Kenny G	Arista	
17 November	The Moment	Kenny G	Arista	
24 November	The Moment	Kenny G	Arista	
1 December	The Moment	Kenny G	Arista	
8 December	The Moment	Kenny G	Arista	
15 December	The Moment	Kenny G	Arista	
22 December	The Moment	Kenny G	Arista	
29 December	The Moment	Kenny G	Arista	

== See also ==
- 1996 in British music
