= List of UK Jazz & Blues Albums Chart number ones =

UK record chart published by the Official Charts Company

The UK Jazz & Blues Albums Chart is a record chart compiled in the United Kingdom by the Official Charts Company (OCC) to determine the 30 most popular albums in the jazz and blues genres. The chart is compiled by the OCC from digital downloads, physical record sales and audio streams in UK retail outlets. The chart has been published on the official OCC website since 1994.

== Number ones ==
- List of UK Jazz & Blues Albums Chart number ones of 1994
- List of UK Jazz & Blues Albums Chart number ones of 1995
- List of UK Jazz & Blues Albums Chart number ones of 1996
- List of UK Jazz & Blues Albums Chart number ones of 1997
- List of UK Jazz & Blues Albums Chart number ones of 1998
- List of UK Jazz & Blues Albums Chart number ones of 1999
- List of UK Jazz & Blues Albums Chart number ones of 1996
- List of UK Jazz & Blues Albums Chart number ones of 1997
- List of UK Jazz & Blues Albums Chart number ones of 1998
- List of UK Jazz & Blues Albums Chart number ones of 1999
- List of UK Jazz & Blues Albums Chart number ones of 2000
- List of UK Jazz & Blues Albums Chart number ones of 2001
- List of UK Jazz & Blues Albums Chart number ones of 2002
- List of UK Jazz & Blues Albums Chart number ones of 2003
- List of UK Jazz & Blues Albums Chart number ones of 2004
- List of UK Jazz & Blues Albums Chart number ones of 2005
- List of UK Jazz & Blues Albums Chart number ones of 2006
- List of UK Jazz & Blues Albums Chart number ones of 2007
- List of UK Jazz & Blues Albums Chart number ones of 2008
- List of UK Jazz & Blues Albums Chart number ones of 2009
- List of UK Jazz & Blues Albums Chart number ones of 2010
- List of UK Jazz & Blues Albums Chart number ones of 2011
- List of UK Jazz & Blues Albums Chart number ones of 2012
- List of UK Jazz & Blues Albums Chart number ones of 2013
- List of UK Jazz & Blues Albums Chart number ones of 2014
- List of UK Jazz & Blues Albums Chart number ones of 2015
- List of UK Jazz & Blues Albums Chart number ones of 2016
- List of UK Jazz & Blues Albums Chart number ones of 2017
- List of UK Jazz & Blues Albums Chart number ones of 2018
- List of UK Jazz & Blues Albums Chart number ones of 2019
- List of UK Jazz & Blues Albums Chart number ones of 2020
- List of UK Jazz & Blues Albums Chart number ones of 2021
- List of UK Jazz & Blues Albums Chart number ones of 2022
- List of UK Jazz & Blues Albums Chart number ones of 2023
- List of UK Jazz & Blues Albums Chart number ones of 2024
- List of UK Jazz & Blues Albums Chart number ones of 2025

== Records ==
=== Artists by most number-one albums ===
Artists with the most number-one albums
Rank	Artist	Number-one albums	Weeks at number one
1	Joe Bonamassa	19	46
2	Seasick Steve	11	67
3	Diana Krall	9	32
4	Gary Moore	8	14
5	Norah Jones	7	116
5	Walter Trout	7	9
7	Rory Gallagher	6	22
7	Joanne Shaw Taylor	6	8
9	Michael Bublé	5	124
9	Miles Davis	5	67
9	Eric Clapton	5	49
9	Nina Simone	5	47
9	Madeleine Peyroux	5	22
9	Ella Fitzgerald	5	521

=== Artists by total weeks at number one ===
Artists with the most total weeks at number one
Rank	Artist	Weeks at number one	Number-one albums
1	Michael Bublé	124	5
2	Norah Jones	116	7
3	Gregory Porter	93	4
4	Caro Emerald	76	2
5	Seasick Steve	67	11
5	Miles Davis	67	5
7	Eric Clapton	49	5
8	Nina Simone	47	5
9	Joe Bonamassa	46	19
10	B. B. King	42	4

=== Albums by total weeks at number one ===
Albums with the most total weeks at number one
Rank	Album	Artist	Weeks at number one
1	Come Away with Me	Norah Jones	75
2	Call Me Irresponsible	Michael Bublé	72
3	Kind of Blue	Miles Davis	62
3	Liquid Spirit	Gregory Porter	62
5	The Shocking Miss Emerald	Caro Emerald	39
6	Deleted Scenes from the Cutting Room Floor	Caro Emerald	37
7	Frank	Amy Winehouse	35
8	Riding with the King	B. B. King, Eric Clapton	34
9	Baduizm	Erykah Badu	32
9	It's Time	Michael Bublé	32
9	Blue & Lonesome	The Rolling Stones	32

=== Albums by longest spells at number one ===
Albums with the longest spells at number one
Rank	Album	Artist	Length of spell (weeks)	First week of spell
1	Riding with the King	B. B. King, Eric Clapton	33	18 June 2000
2	Come Away with Me	Norah Jones	28	28 July 2002
3	Call Me Irresponsible	Michael Bublé	27	4 November 2007
4	Baduizm	Erykah Badu	25	9 March 1997
5	I Started Out with Nothin and I Still Got Most of It Left	Seasick Steve	24	5 October 2008
6	The Very Best of Nina Simone	Nina Simone	23	7 May 2006
7	Blue & Lonesome	The Rolling Stones	21	9 December 2016
8	Come Away with Me	Norah Jones	19	16 February 2003
8	Liquid Spirit	Gregory Porter	19	18 May 2014
10	The Shocking Miss Emerald	Caro Emerald	18	12 May 2013

== See also ==
- List of artists by number of UK Jazz & Blues Albums Chart number ones
