= List of UK Jazz & Blues Albums Chart number ones of 1999 =

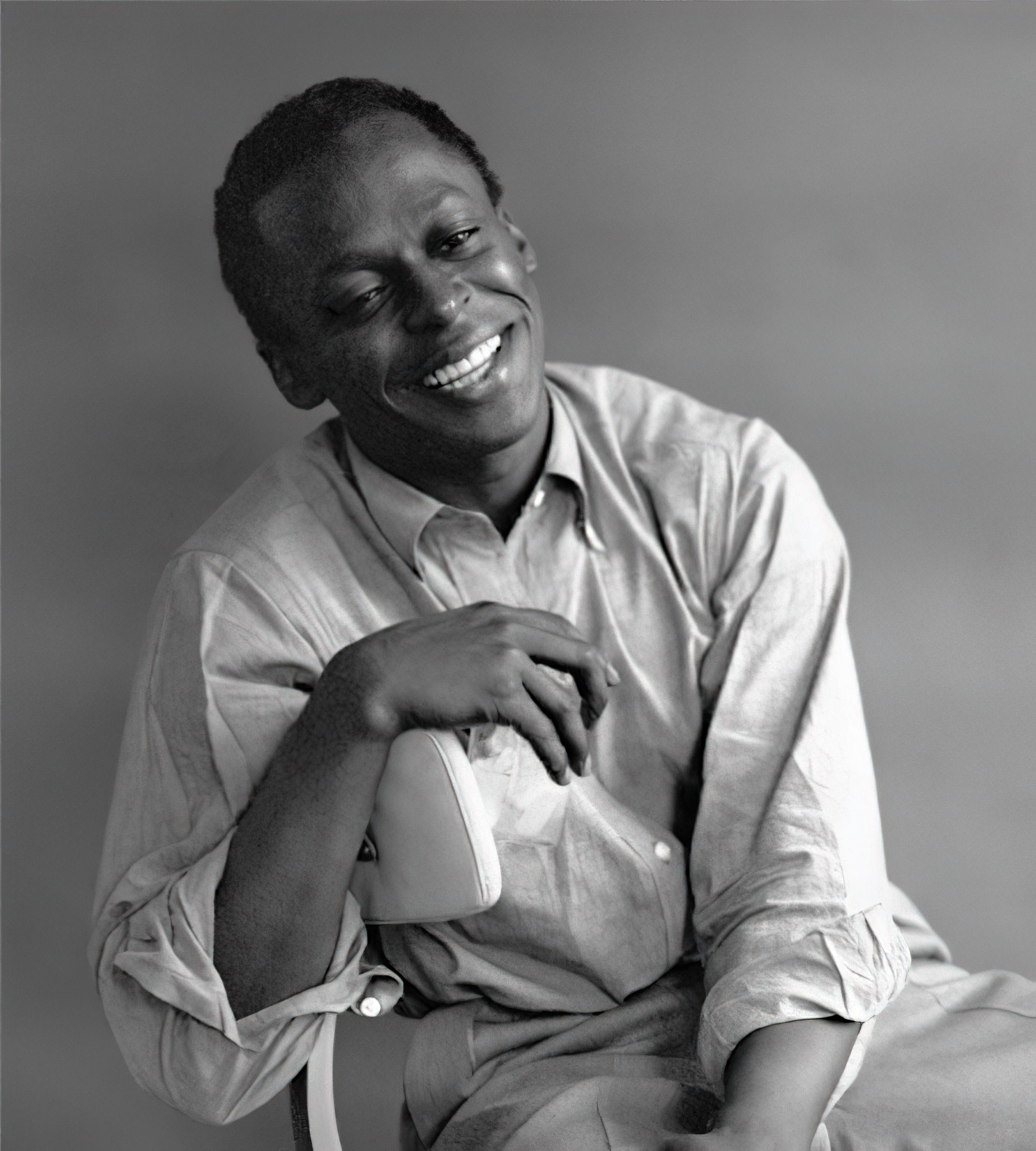
Kind of Blue by Miles Davis was the most successful album on the UK Jazz & Blues Albums Chart in 1999, spending a total of 19 weeks at number one.

The UK Jazz & Blues Albums Chart is a record chart which ranks the best-selling jazz and blues albums in the United Kingdom. Compiled and published by the Official Charts Company, the data is based on each album's weekly physical sales, digital downloads and streams. In 1999, 52 charts were published with 14 albums at number one. The first number-one album of the year was the 1959 album Kind of Blue by American jazz trumpeter Miles Davis, which spent the first six weeks of the year atop the chart. The last number-one album of the year was The Only Jazz Album You'll Ever Need, a compilation of songs by various artists released by RCA Victor, which spent the last three weeks of the year atop the chart.

The most successful album on the UK Jazz & Blues Albums Chart in 1999 was Kind of Blue, which spent a total of 19 weeks at number one across six different spells, the longest of which was six weeks across January and February. Global Television's Salsa Fever! compilation was number one for eight consecutive weeks in the summer, while Eric Clapton's compilation Blues was the second most successful single-artist album of the year, with four weeks at number one. Four more albums spent three weeks each at number one in 1999: His Definitive Greatest Hits by B. B. King, When I Look in Your Eyes by Diana Krall, and the compilations The Very Best of Latin Jazz 2 and The Only Jazz Album You'll Ever Need.

== Chart history ==
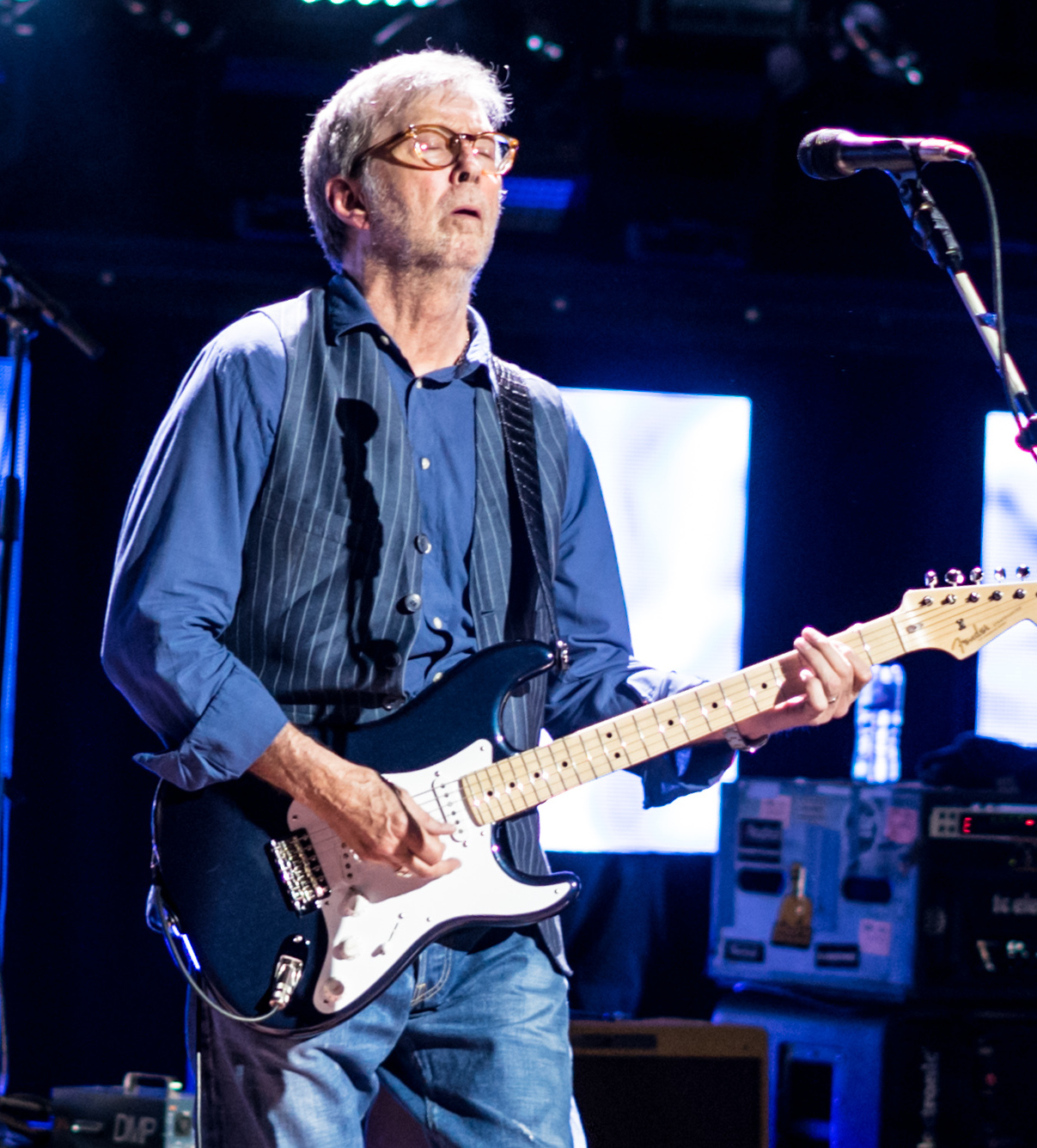
Eric Clapton spent four weeks at number one on the UK Jazz & Blues Albums Chart in 1999 with Blues.

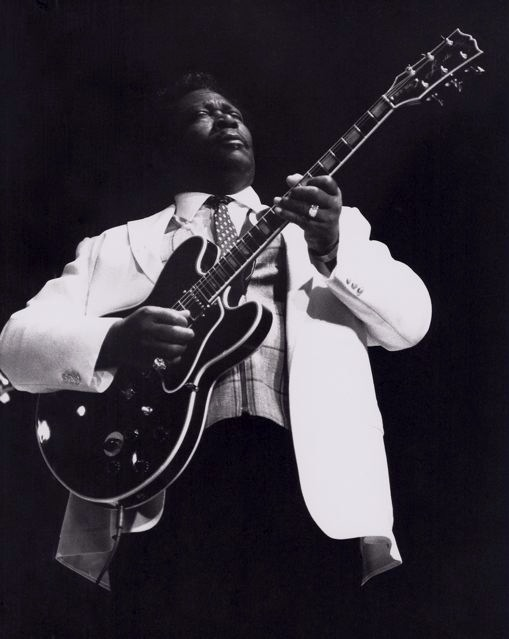
His Definitive Greatest Hits by B. B. King spent three consecutive weeks atop the chart between 25 April and 15 May.

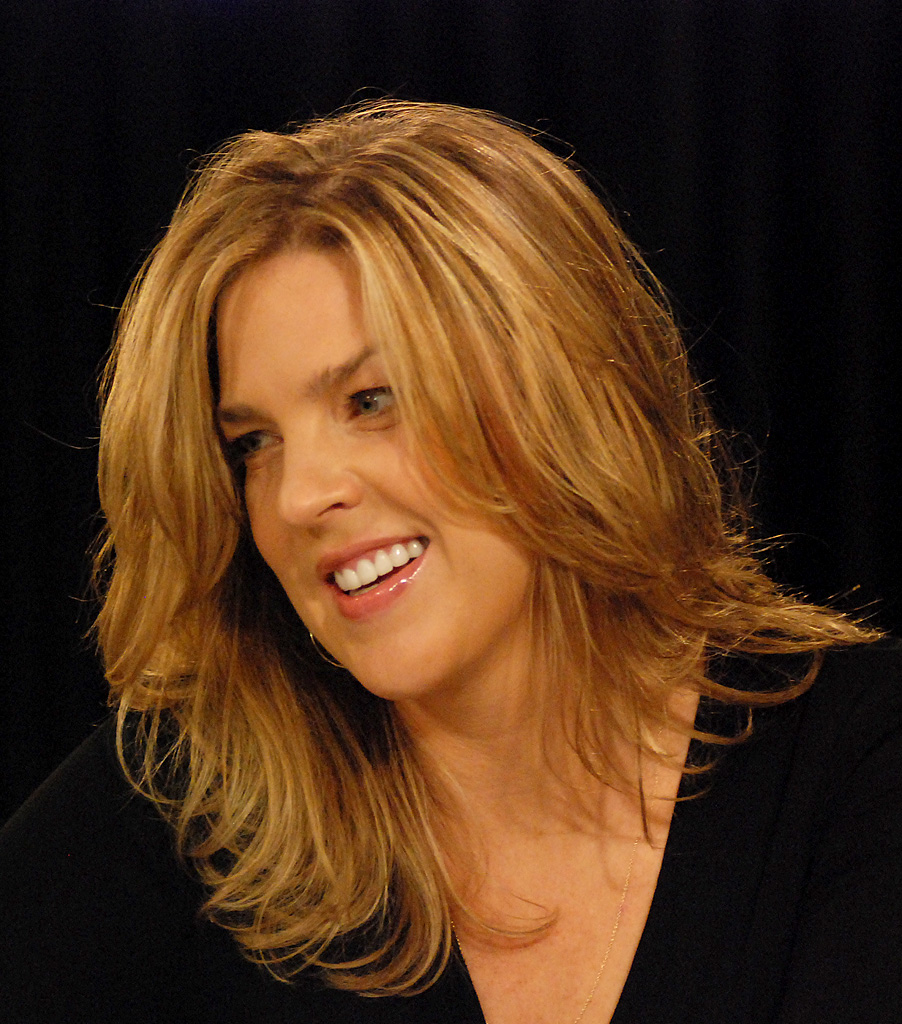
Diana Krall's fifth studio album When I Look in Your Eyes was number one for three weeks in 1999.

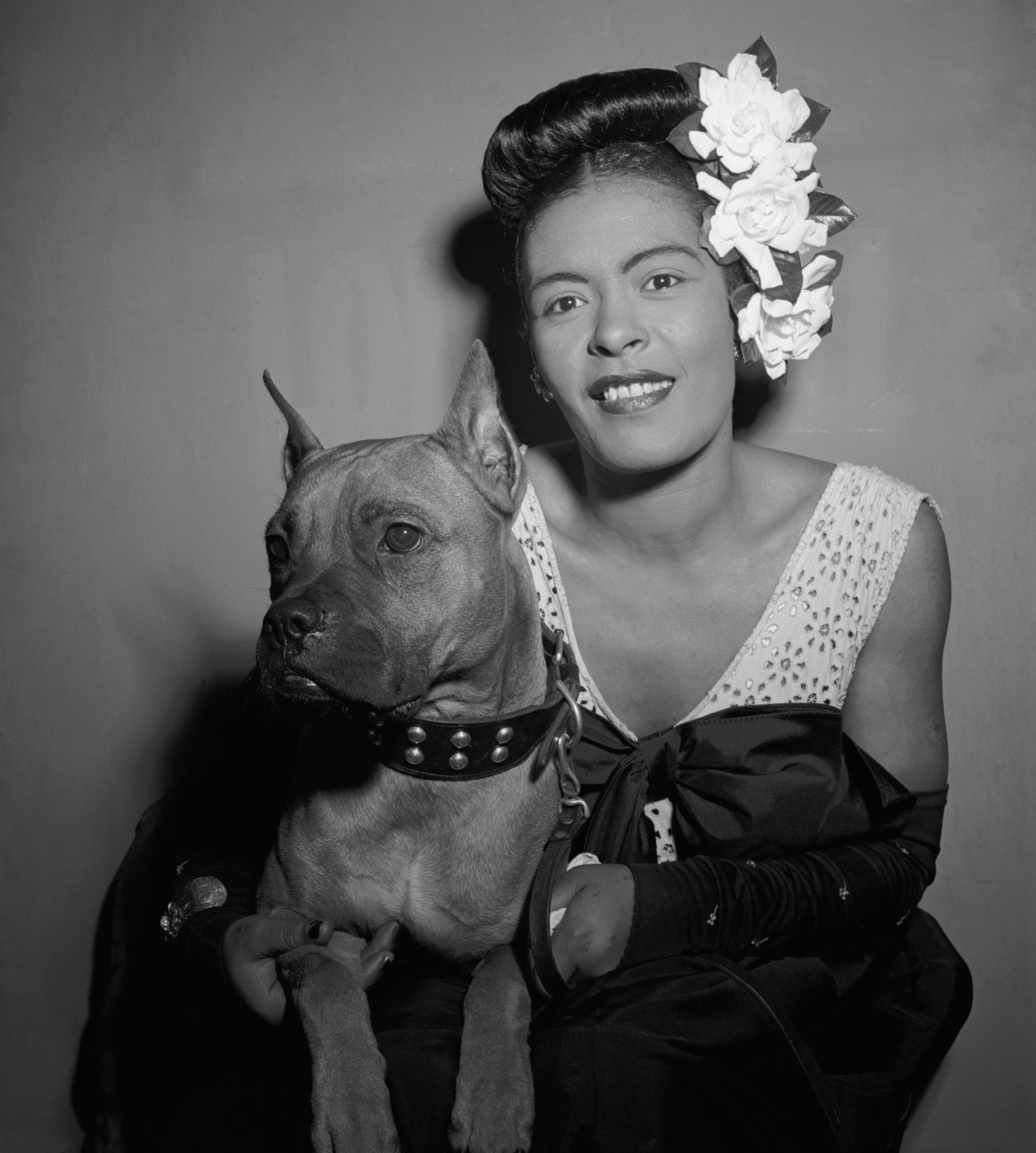
Billie Holiday's greatest hits album The Very Best of Billie Holiday spent two weeks at number one during October 1999.

| Issue date | Album | Artist(s) | Record label(s) | Ref. |
|---|---|---|---|---|
| 3 January | Kind of Blue | Miles Davis | Columbia | |
| 10 January | Kind of Blue | Miles Davis | Columbia | |
| 17 January | Kind of Blue | Miles Davis | Columbia | |
| 24 January | Kind of Blue | Miles Davis | Columbia | |
| 31 January | Kind of Blue | Miles Davis | Columbia | |
| 7 February | Kind of Blue | Miles Davis | Columbia | |
| 14 February | Talkin' Verve: Soundwaves Series Sampler 1 | various artists | Verve | |
| 21 February | Talkin' Verve: Soundwaves Series Sampler 1 | various artists | Verve | |
| 28 February | Blues Blues Blues | Jimmy Rogers | Atlantic | |
| 7 March | Kind of Blue | Miles Davis | Columbia | |
| 14 March | The Very Best of Latin Jazz | various artists | Global Television | |
| 21 March | Kind of Blue | Miles Davis | Columbia | |
| 28 March | Traveling Miles | Cassandra Wilson | Blue Note | |
| 4 April | Kind of Blue | Miles Davis | Columbia | |
| 11 April | Kind of Blue | Miles Davis | Columbia | |
| 18 April | Kind of Blue | Miles Davis | Columbia | |
| 25 April | His Definitive Greatest Hits | B. B. King | UMTV | |
| 2 May | His Definitive Greatest Hits | B. B. King | UMTV | |
| 9 May | His Definitive Greatest Hits | B. B. King | UMTV | |
| 16 May | The Very Best of Latin Jazz 2 | various artists | Global Television | |
| 23 May | The Very Best of Latin Jazz 2 | various artists | Global Television | |
| 30 May | The Very Best of Latin Jazz 2 | various artists | Global Television | |
| 6 June | When I Look in Your Eyes | Diana Krall | Verve | |
| 13 June | The Very Best of Jazz Funk | various artists | Global Television | |
| 20 June | Blues | Eric Clapton | Polydor | |
| 27 June | Blues | Eric Clapton | Polydor | |
| 4 July | Blues | Eric Clapton | Polydor | |
| 11 July | Mundo Latino | various artists | Columbia | |
| 18 July | Blues | Eric Clapton | Polydor | |
| 25 July | Salsa Fever! | various artists | Global Television | |
| 1 August | Salsa Fever! | various artists | Global Television | |
| 8 August | Salsa Fever! | various artists | Global Television | |
| 15 August | Salsa Fever! | various artists | Global Television | |
| 22 August | Salsa Fever! | various artists | Global Television | |
| 29 August | Salsa Fever! | various artists | Global Television | |
| 5 September | Salsa Fever! | various artists | Global Television | |
| 12 September | Salsa Fever! | various artists | Global Television | |
| 19 September | Kind of Blue | Miles Davis | Columbia | |
| 26 September | Kind of Blue | Miles Davis | Columbia | |
| 3 October | The Very Best of Billie Holiday | Billie Holiday | Verve | |
| 10 October | The Very Best of Billie Holiday | Billie Holiday | Verve | |
| 17 October | Kind of Blue | Miles Davis | Columbia | |
| 24 October | Kind of Blue | Miles Davis | Columbia | |
| 31 October | Kind of Blue | Miles Davis | Columbia | |
| 7 November | Kind of Blue | Miles Davis | Columbia | |
| 14 November | Kind of Blue | Miles Davis | Columbia | |
| 21 November | Kind of Blue | Miles Davis | Columbia | |
| 28 November | The Only Jazz Album You'll Ever Need | various artists | RCA Victor | |
| 5 December | The Only Jazz Album You'll Ever Need | various artists | RCA Victor | |
| 12 December | When I Look in Your Eyes | Diana Krall | Verve | |
| 19 December | When I Look in Your Eyes | Diana Krall | Verve | |
| 26 December | The Only Jazz Album You'll Ever Need | various artists | RCA Victor | |

== See also ==
- 1999 in British music
