= List of UK Jazz & Blues Albums Chart number ones of 2008 =

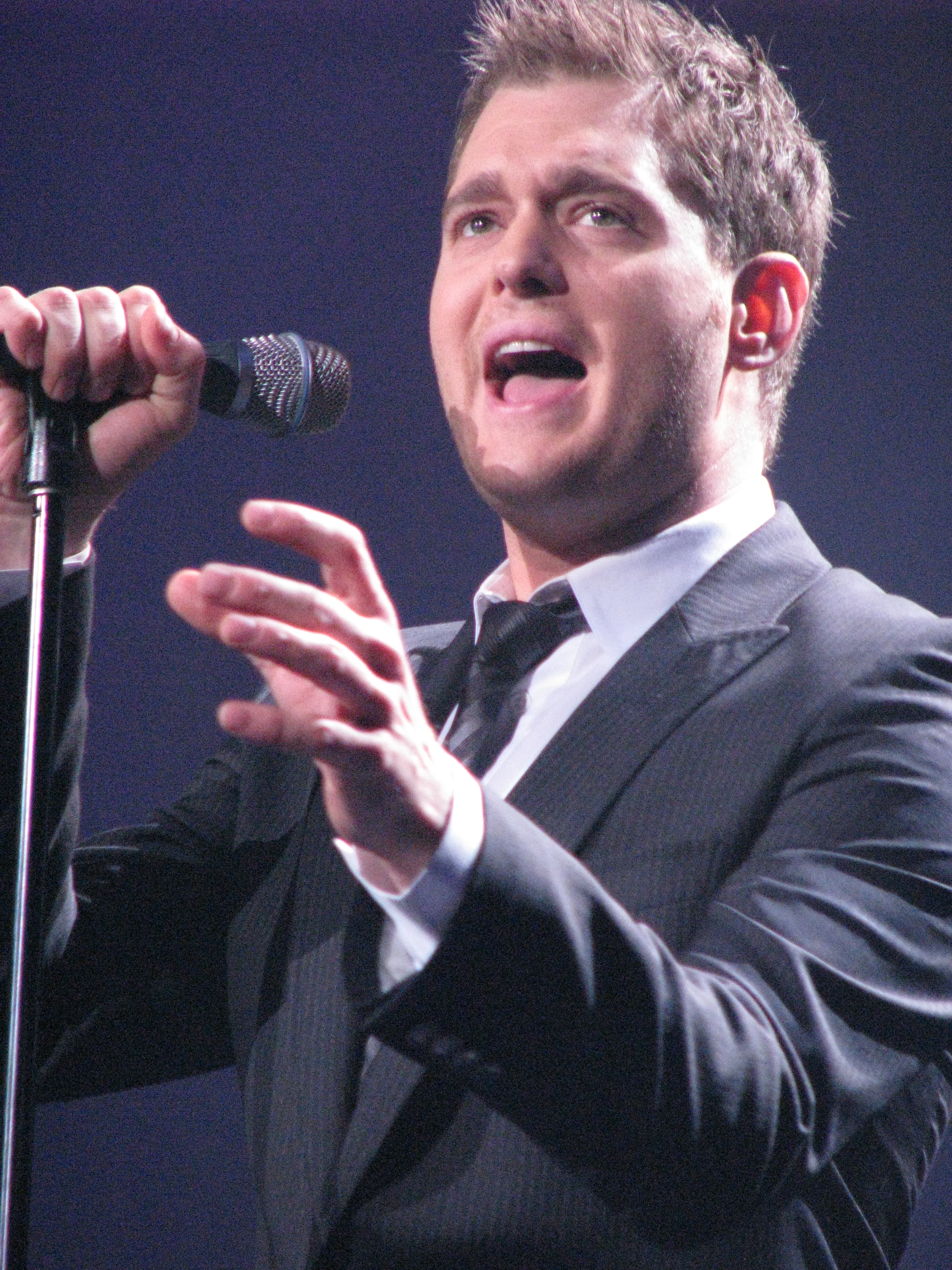
Michael Bublé's fifth studio album Call Me Irresponsible spent 28 weeks at number one on the UK Jazz & Blues Albums Chart in 2008, including the first 18 weeks of the year.

The UK Jazz & Blues Albums Chart is a record chart which ranks the best-selling jazz and blues albums in the United Kingdom. Compiled and published by the Official Charts Company, the data is based on each album's weekly physical sales, digital downloads and streams. In 2008, 52 charts were published with five albums at number one. Michael Bublé's fifth studio album Call Me Irresponsible was the first number-one album of the year, spending the first 18 weeks atop the chart in the second half of a 36-week run. Seasick Steve's major label debut I Started Out with Nothin and I Still Got Most of It Left was the last number-one album of the year, topping the final 13 charts of 2008.

The most successful album on the UK Jazz & Blues Albums Chart in 2008 was Call Me Irresponsible, which spent a total of 28 weeks at the top of the chart. I Started Out with Nothin and I Still Got Most of It Left was the second most successful of the year with 13 weeks at number one, while Amy Winehouse's debut album Frank spent seven weeks at the top of the chart over three separate spells. The Jazz FM various artists compilation The Very Best of Smooth Jazz was the only other release to spend more than a single week at number one, with three weeks in the summer at number one. Call Me Irresponsible finished 2008 as the 27th best-selling album of the year in the UK.

== Chart history ==
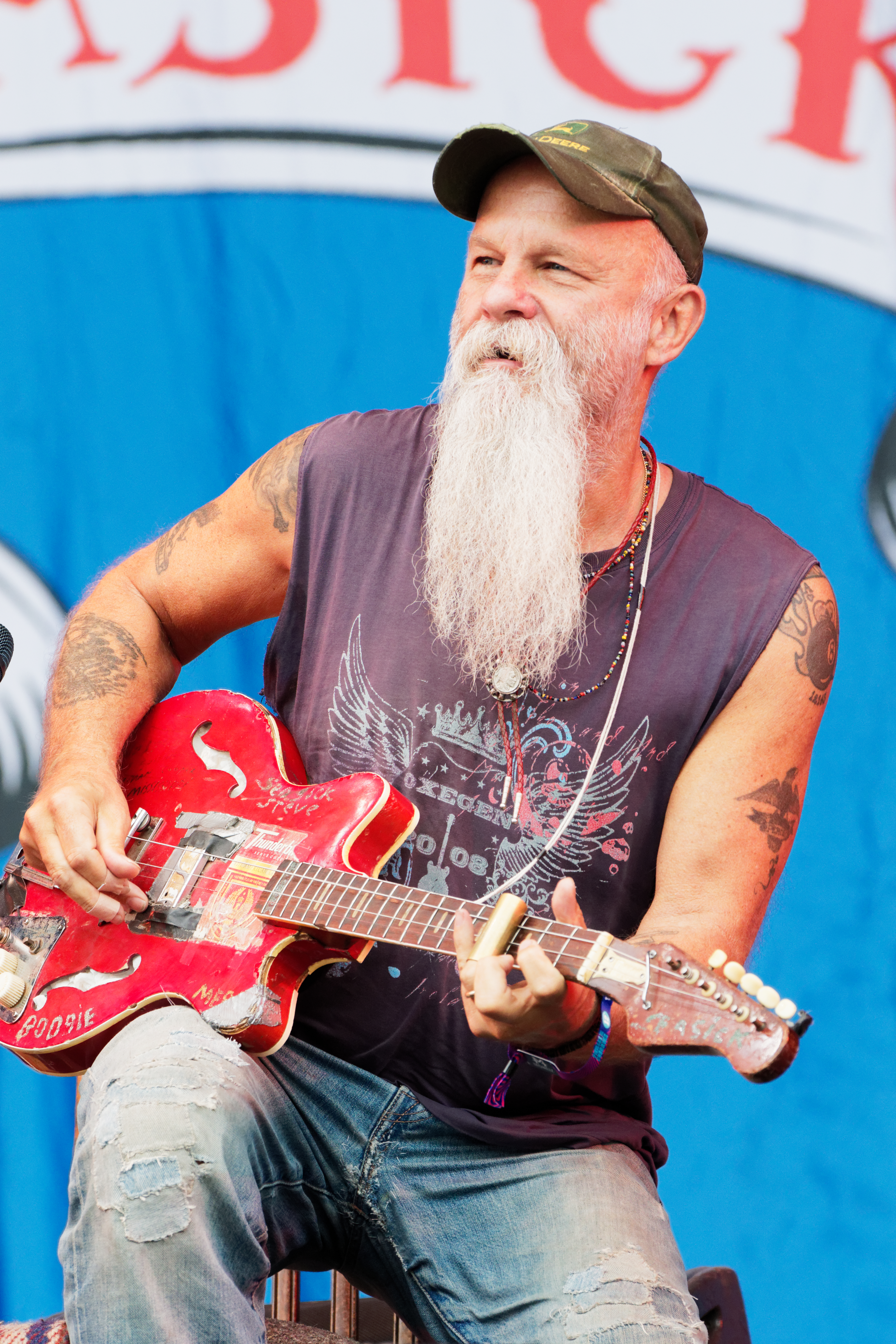
Seasick Steve spent the last 13 weeks of 2008 at number one on the UK Jazz & Blues Albums Chart with his major label debut, I Started Out with Nothin and I Still Got Most of It Left.

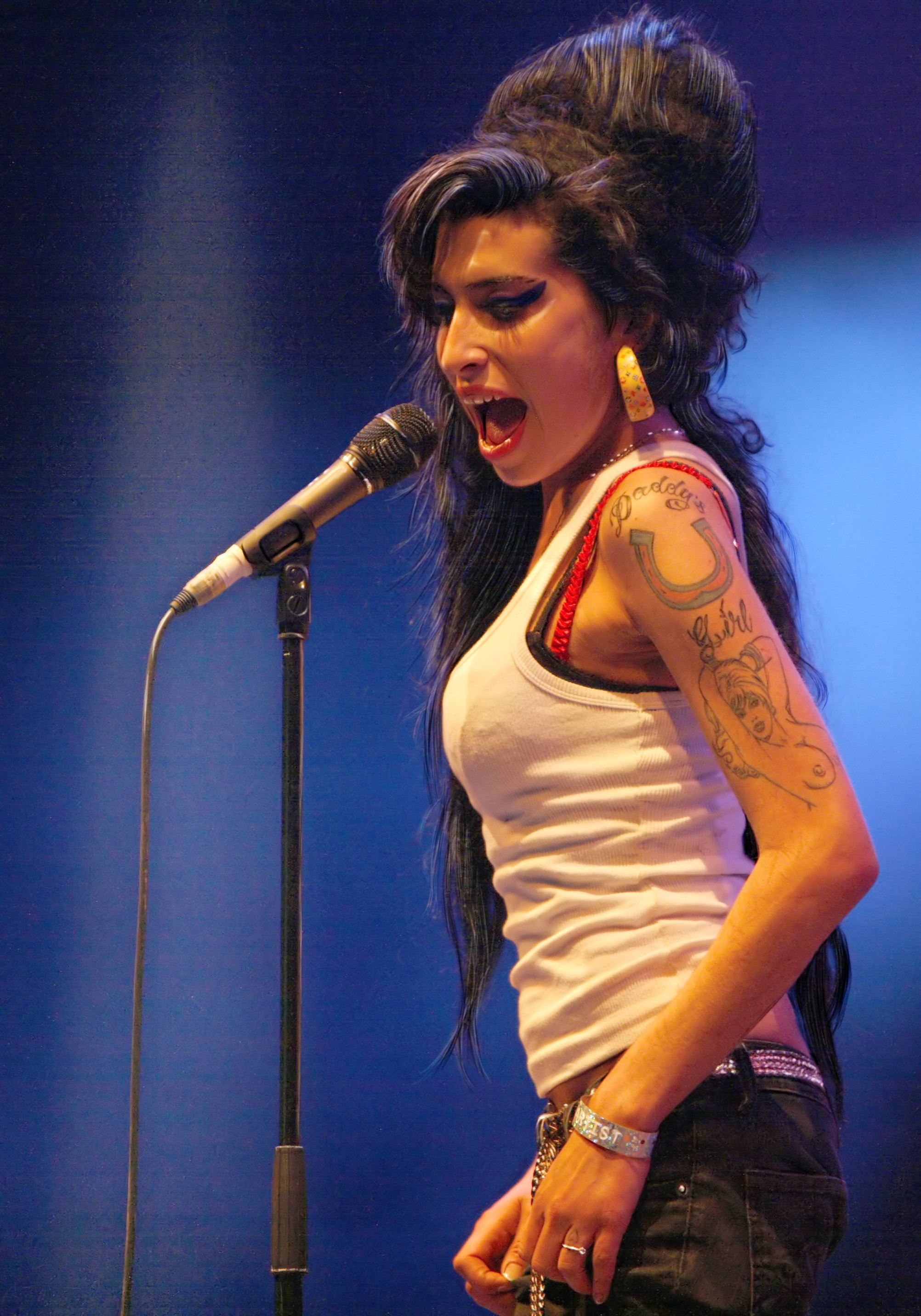
Frank by Amy Winehouse returned to the top spot on three occasions in 2008, spending a total of seven weeks at number one during the year.

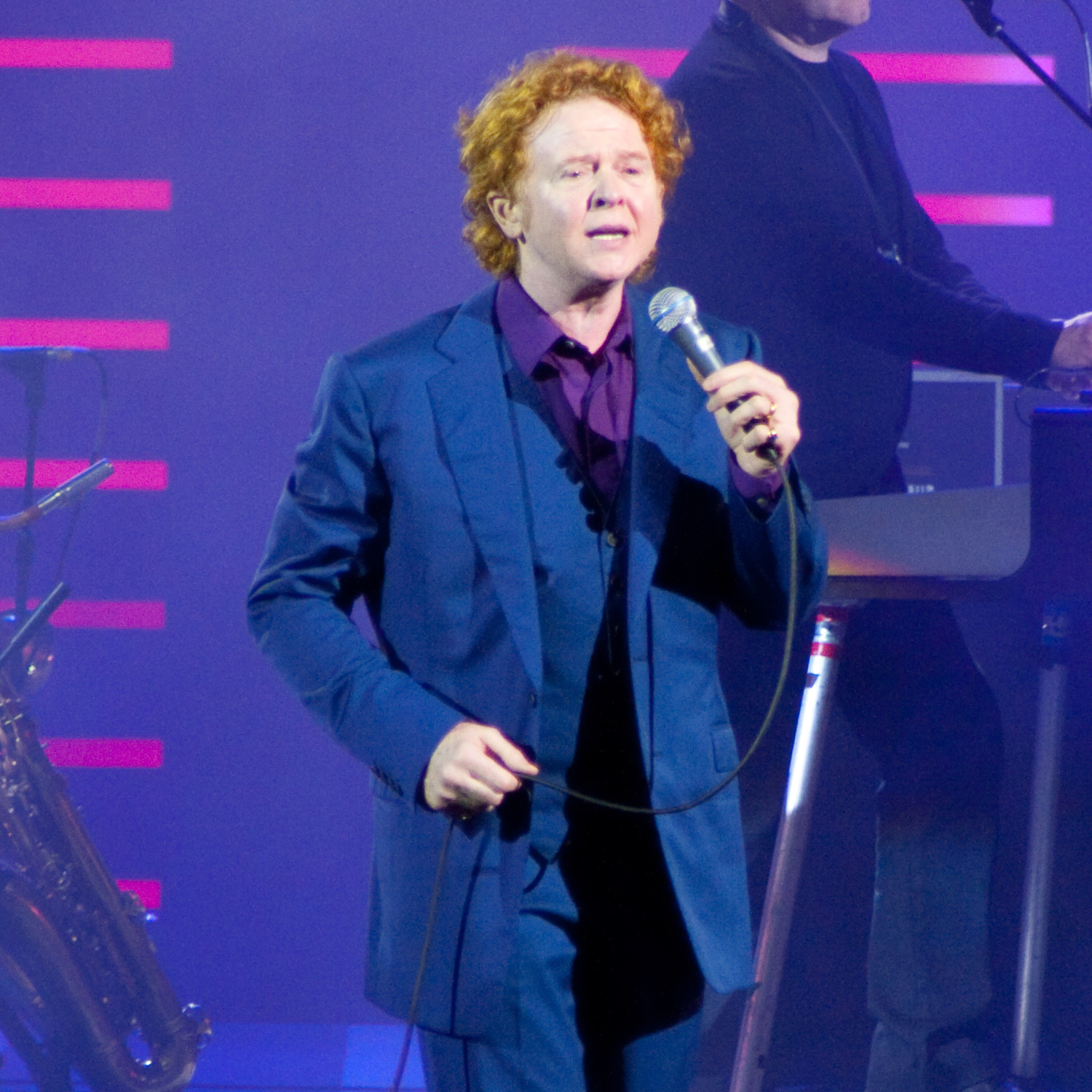
Simply Red frontman Mick Hucknall was the only other artist to top the chart in 2008, spending one week at number one with his solo debut, Tribute to Bobby.

Key
†	Indicates best-selling jazz/blues album of 2008

Issue date	Album	Artist(s)	Record label(s)	Ref.
6 January	Call Me Irresponsible †	Michael Bublé	Reprise	
13 January	Call Me Irresponsible †	Michael Bublé	Reprise	
20 January	Call Me Irresponsible †	Michael Bublé	Reprise	
27 January	Call Me Irresponsible †	Michael Bublé	Reprise	
3 February	Call Me Irresponsible †	Michael Bublé	Reprise	
10 February	Call Me Irresponsible †	Michael Bublé	Reprise	
17 February	Call Me Irresponsible †	Michael Bublé	Reprise	
24 February	Call Me Irresponsible †	Michael Bublé	Reprise	
2 March	Call Me Irresponsible †	Michael Bublé	Reprise	
9 March	Call Me Irresponsible †	Michael Bublé	Reprise	
16 March	Call Me Irresponsible †	Michael Bublé	Reprise	
23 March	Call Me Irresponsible †	Michael Bublé	Reprise	
30 March	Call Me Irresponsible †	Michael Bublé	Reprise	
6 April	Call Me Irresponsible †	Michael Bublé	Reprise	
13 April	Call Me Irresponsible †	Michael Bublé	Reprise	
20 April	Call Me Irresponsible †	Michael Bublé	Reprise	
27 April	Call Me Irresponsible †	Michael Bublé	Reprise	
4 May	Call Me Irresponsible †	Michael Bublé	Reprise	
11 May	Frank	Amy Winehouse	Island	
18 May	Frank	Amy Winehouse	Island	
25 May	Tribute to Bobby	Mick Hucknall	SimplyRed.com	
1 June	Frank	Amy Winehouse	Island	
8 June	Frank	Amy Winehouse	Island	
15 June	Frank	Amy Winehouse	Island	
22 June	Frank	Amy Winehouse	Island	
29 June	The Very Best of Smooth Jazz	various artists	Jazz FM	
6 July	The Very Best of Smooth Jazz	various artists	Jazz FM	
13 July	The Very Best of Smooth Jazz	various artists	Jazz FM	
20 July	Frank	Amy Winehouse	Island	
27 July	Call Me Irresponsible †	Michael Bublé	Reprise	
3 August	Call Me Irresponsible †	Michael Bublé	Reprise	
10 August	Call Me Irresponsible †	Michael Bublé	Reprise	
17 August	Call Me Irresponsible †	Michael Bublé	Reprise	
24 August	Call Me Irresponsible †	Michael Bublé	Reprise	
31 August	Call Me Irresponsible †	Michael Bublé	Reprise	
7 September	Call Me Irresponsible †	Michael Bublé	Reprise	
14 September	Call Me Irresponsible †	Michael Bublé	Reprise	
21 September	Call Me Irresponsible †	Michael Bublé	Reprise	
28 September	Call Me Irresponsible †	Michael Bublé	Reprise	
5 October	I Started Out with Nothin and I Still Got Most of It Left	Seasick Steve	Warner Bros.	
12 October	I Started Out with Nothin and I Still Got Most of It Left	Seasick Steve	Warner Bros.	
19 October	I Started Out with Nothin and I Still Got Most of It Left	Seasick Steve	Warner Bros.	
26 October	I Started Out with Nothin and I Still Got Most of It Left	Seasick Steve	Warner Bros.	
2 November	I Started Out with Nothin and I Still Got Most of It Left	Seasick Steve	Warner Bros.	
9 November	I Started Out with Nothin and I Still Got Most of It Left	Seasick Steve	Warner Bros.	
16 November	I Started Out with Nothin and I Still Got Most of It Left	Seasick Steve	Warner Bros.	
23 November	I Started Out with Nothin and I Still Got Most of It Left	Seasick Steve	Warner Bros.	
30 November	I Started Out with Nothin and I Still Got Most of It Left	Seasick Steve	Warner Bros.	
7 December	I Started Out with Nothin and I Still Got Most of It Left	Seasick Steve	Warner Bros.	
14 December	I Started Out with Nothin and I Still Got Most of It Left	Seasick Steve	Warner Bros.	
21 December	I Started Out with Nothin and I Still Got Most of It Left	Seasick Steve	Warner Bros.	
28 December	I Started Out with Nothin and I Still Got Most of It Left	Seasick Steve	Warner Bros.	

== See also ==
- 2008 in British music
