= List of UK Country Albums Chart number ones of 2012 =

These are the Official Charts Company's UK Country Albums Chart number ones of 2012. The chart week runs from Friday to Thursday with the chart-date given as the following Thursday. Chart positions are based the multi-metric consumption of country music in the United Kingdom, blending traditional album sales, track equivalent albums, and streaming equivalent albums. The chart contains 20 positions.

In the iteration of the chart dated 1 January, Need You Now by Lady Antebellum spent its twenty-eighth week at number one. In fact, Lady Antebellum spent a total of thirty-three weeks in the top spot with Need You Now and their follow-up album Own the Night, including occupying the chart peak every week from 22 July until the end of the year on 30 December. Gretchen Peters spent five nonconsecutive weeks at number one with Hello Cruel World, while Nanci Griffith earned her third and final UK Country number one with Intersection, the last album she released before her death in 2021. In addition to Griffith, four other artists spent two consecutive weeks in the top spot: The Band Perry with their self-titled debut album, And So It Goes by Don Williams, Carrie Underwood's Blown Away, and Mary Chapin Carpenter's Ashes and Roses, which became her fourth UK chart topper. The final number one of the year was Need You Now by Lady Antebellum.

== Chart history ==
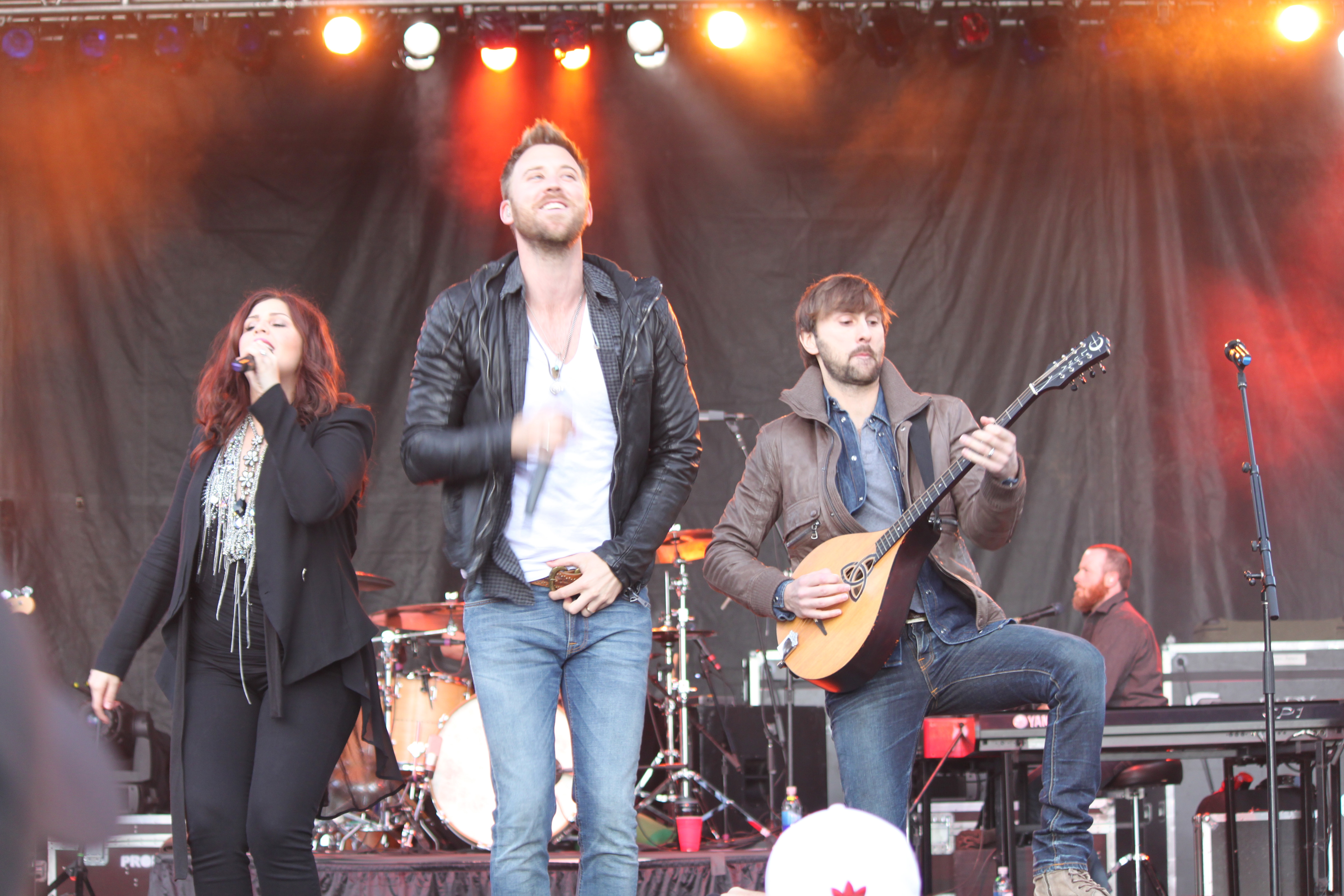
Lady Antebellum spent a leading thirty-three weeks at number one with their two albums Need You Now and Own the Night.

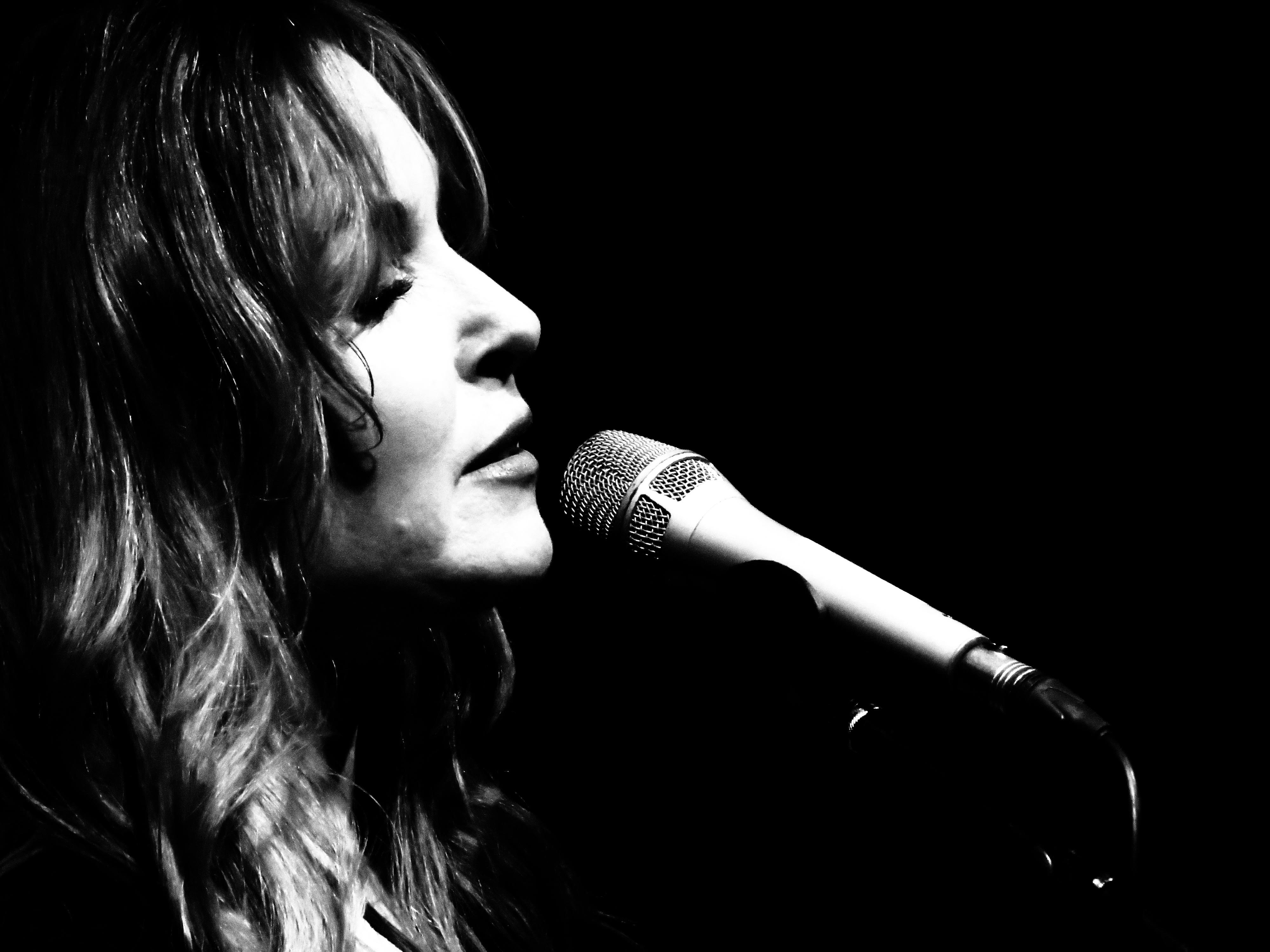
Hello Cruel World by Gretchen Peters spent five weeks at the chart peak.

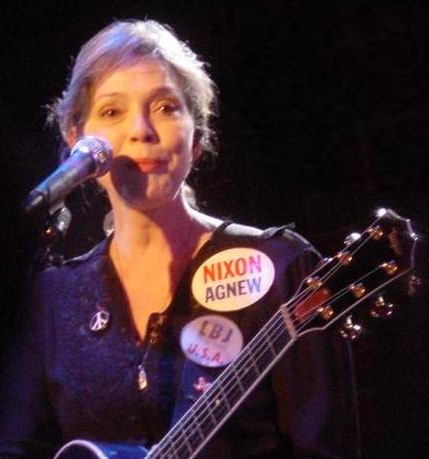
Nanci Griffith's Intersection became her third and final number one before her death in 2021.

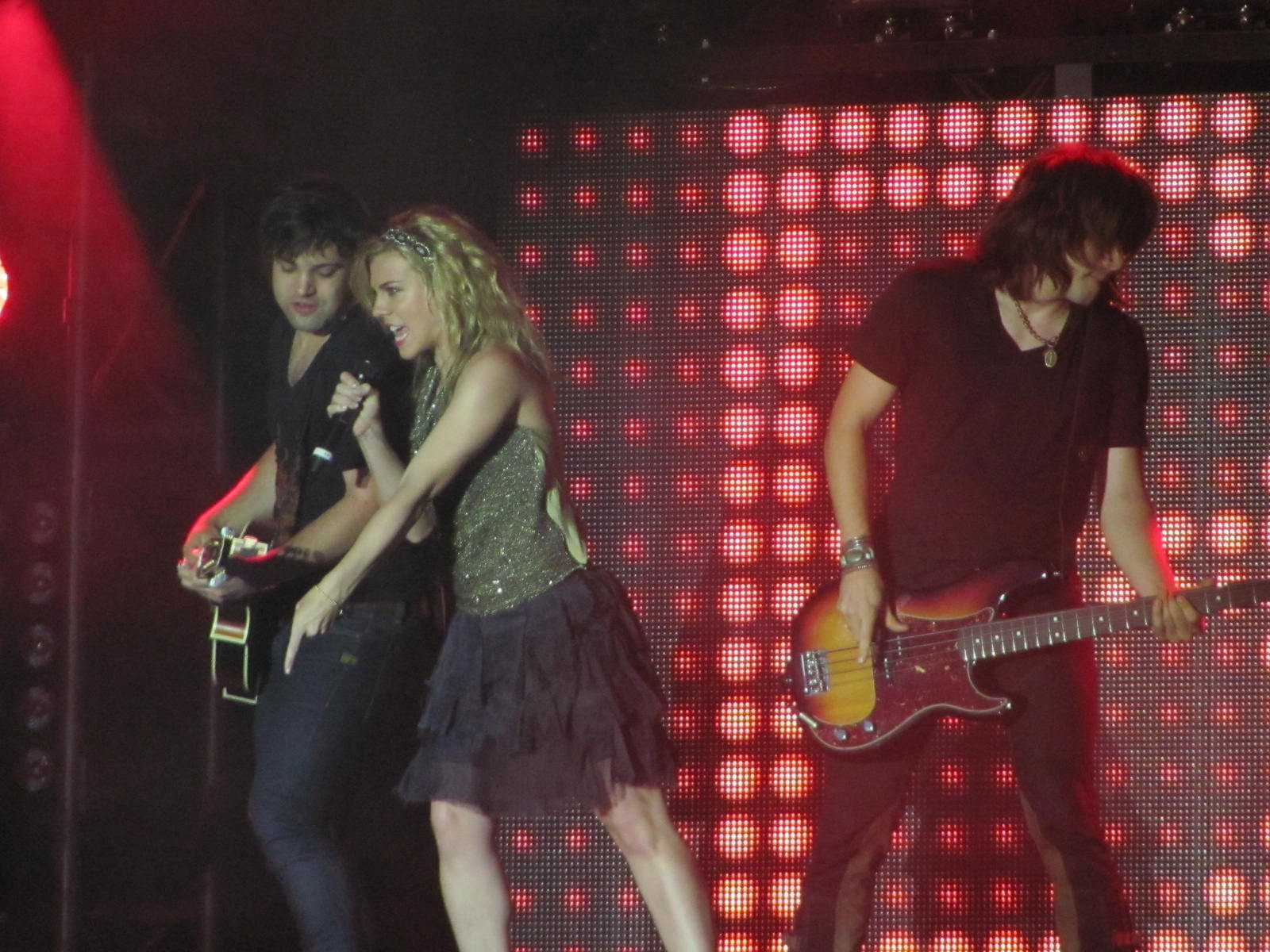
The Band Perry's debut album was number one for two consecutive weeks.

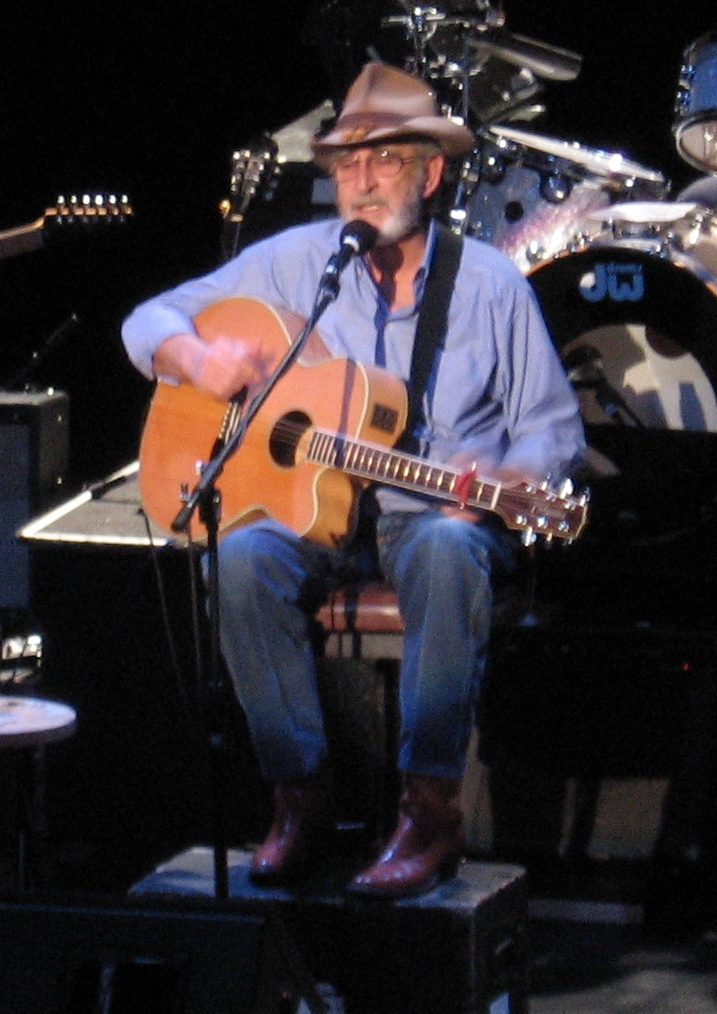
Veteran artist Don Williams achieved his first ever number one with And So It Goes.

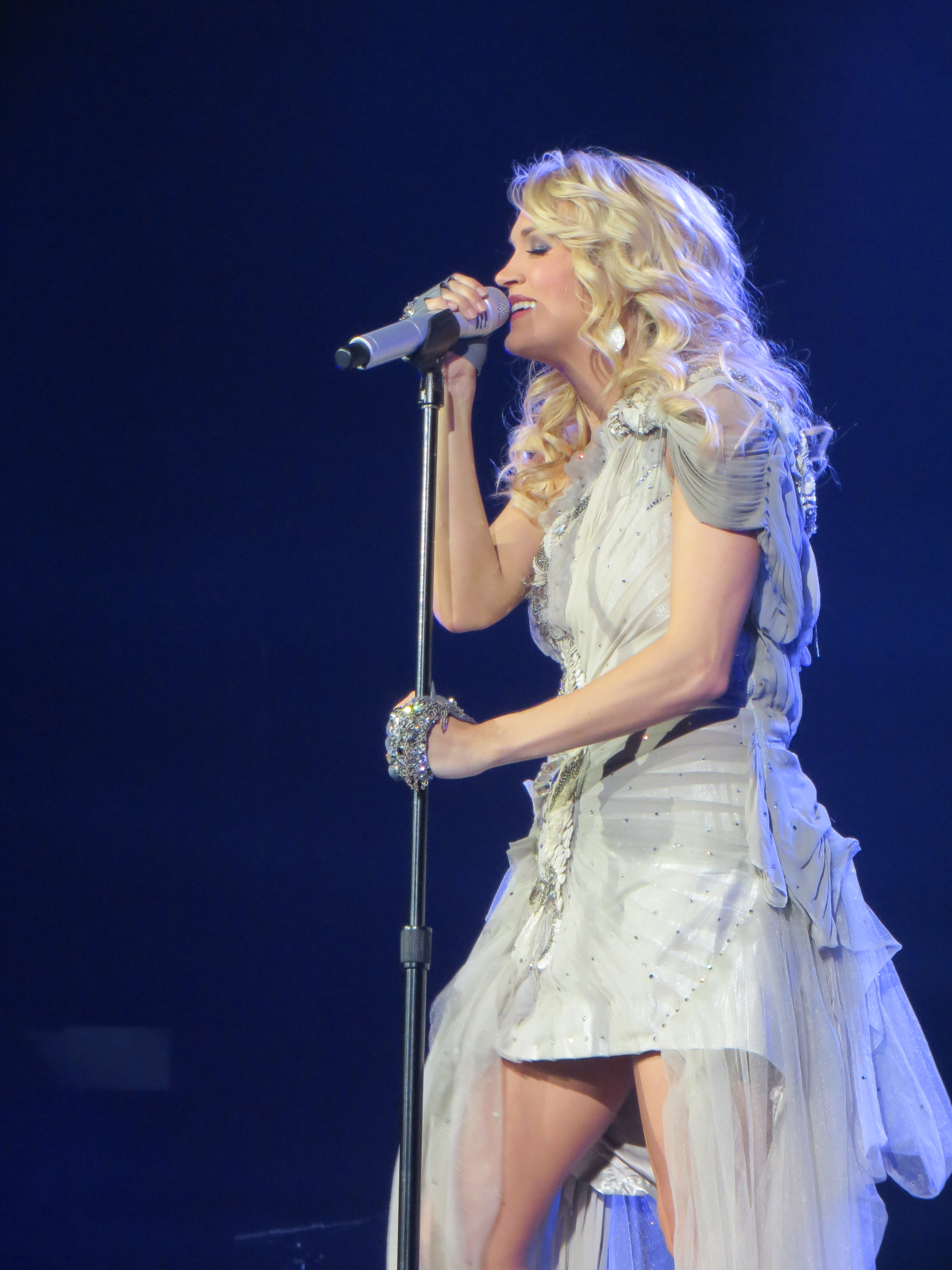
Blown Away became Carrie Underwood's second UK number one, and held the top spot for two weeks.

Issue date	Album	Artist(s)	Record label	Ref.
1 January	Need You Now	Lady Antebellum	Capitol	
8 January	Middle of Everywhere	Pokey LaFarge	Continental Song	
15 January	For the Good Times	The Little Willies	Parlophone	
22 January	Need You Now	Lady Antebellum	Capitol	
29 January	Ghost on the Canvas	Glen Campbell	Surfdog	
5 February	Hello Cruel World	Gretchen Peters	Proper	
12 February	Hello Cruel World	Gretchen Peters	Proper	
19 February	Hello Cruel World	Gretchen Peters	Proper	
26 February	Intersection	Nanci Griffith	Proper	
4 March	Intersection	Nanci Griffith	Proper	
11 March	Hello Cruel World	Gretchen Peters	Proper	
18 March	Hello Cruel World	Gretchen Peters	Proper	
25 March	The Band Perry	The Band Perry	Mercury Nashville	
1 April	The Band Perry	The Band Perry	Mercury Nashville	
8 April	Own the Night	Lady Antebellum	Capitol	
15 April	Own the Night	Lady Antebellum	Capitol	
22 April	Own the Night	Lady Antebellum	Capitol	
26 April	Own the Night	Lady Antebellum	Capitol	
6 May	And So It Goes	Don Williams	Sugar Hill	
13 May	And So It Goes	Don Williams	Sugar Hill	
20 May	Heroes	Willie Nelson	Sony	
27 May	Own the Night	Lady Antebellum	Capitol	
3 June	Own the Night	Lady Antebellum	Capitol	
10 June	Need You Now	Lady Antebellum	Capitol	
17 June	The Classics	Johnny Cash	Sony	
24 June	Blown Away	Carrie Underwood	Arista Nashville	
1 July	Blown Away	Carrie Underwood	Arista Nashville	
8 July	Ashes and Roses	Mary Chapin Carpenter	Rounder	
15 July	Ashes and Roses	Mary Chapin Carpenter	Rounder	
22 July	Own the Night	Lady Antebellum	Capitol	
29 July	Own the Night	Lady Antebellum	Capitol	
5 August	Own the Night	Lady Antebellum	Capitol	
12 August	Own the Night	Lady Antebellum	Capitol	
19 August	Own the Night	Lady Antebellum	Capitol	
26 August	Own the Night	Lady Antebellum	Capitol	
2 September	Own the Night	Lady Antebellum	Capitol	
9 September	Own the Night	Lady Antebellum	Capitol	
16 September	Own the Night	Lady Antebellum	Capitol	
23 September	Own the Night	Lady Antebellum	Capitol	
30 September	Own the Night	Lady Antebellum	Capitol	
7 October	Own the Night	Lady Antebellum	Capitol	
14 October	Own the Night	Lady Antebellum	Capitol	
21 October	Own the Night	Lady Antebellum	Capitol	
28 October	Own the Night	Lady Antebellum	Capitol	
4 November	Own the Night	Lady Antebellum	Capitol	
11 November	Own the Night	Lady Antebellum	Capitol	
18 November	Own the Night	Lady Antebellum	Capitol	
25 November	Need You Now/Own the Night	Lady Antebellum	Capitol	
2 December	Need You Now/Own the Night	Lady Antebellum	Capitol	
9 December	Need You Now	Lady Antebellum	Capitol	
16 December	Need You Now	Lady Antebellum	Capitol	
23 December	Need You Now	Lady Antebellum	Capitol	
30 December	Need You Now	Lady Antebellum	Capitol	

== Most weeks at number one ==
Weeks at number one	Artist
33	Lady Antebellum
5	Gretchen Peters
2	Carrie Underwood
2	Don Williams
2	Mary Chapin Carpenter
2	Nanci Griffith
2	The Band Perry

== See also ==
- List of UK Albums Chart number ones of 2012
- List of UK Dance Singles Chart number ones of 2012
- List of UK Album Downloads Chart number ones of 2012
- List of UK Independent Albums Chart number ones of 2012
- List of UK R&B Albums Chart number ones of 2012
- List of UK Rock & Metal Albums Chart number ones of 2012
- List of UK Compilation Chart number ones of the 2010s
