= List of UK Independent Albums Chart number ones of 2012 =

These are the Official Charts Company's UK Indie Chart number-one albums of 2012.

== Chart history ==
Key
†	Best-selling indie album of the year

Issue date	Album	Artist(s)	Record label	Ref.
1 January	21 †	Adele	XL	
8 January	21 †	Adele	XL	
15 January	21 †	Adele	XL	
22 January	21 †	Adele	XL	
29 January	21 †	Adele	XL	
5 February	21 †	Adele	XL	
12 February	21 †	Adele	XL	
19 February	21 †	Adele	XL	
26 February	21 †	Adele	XL	
4 March	21 †	Adele	XL	
11 March	21 †	Adele	XL	
18 March	21 †	Adele	XL	
25 March	21 †	Adele	XL	
1 April	21 †	Adele	XL	
8 April	21 †	Adele	XL	
15 April	21 †	Adele	XL	
22 April	21 †	Adele	XL	
29 April	Blunderbuss	Jack White	XL	
6 May	Blunderbuss	Jack White	XL	
13 May	21 †	Adele	XL	
20 May	21 †	Adele	XL	
27 May	Driving Towards the Daylight	Joe Bonamassa	Provogue	
3 June	21 †	Adele	XL	
10 June	21 †	Adele	XL	
17 June	21 †	Adele	XL	
24 June	21 †	Adele	XL	
1 July	21 †	Adele	XL	
8 July	21 †	Adele	XL	
15 July	Cheeky for a Reason	The View	Cooking Vinyl	
22 July	21 †	Adele	XL	
29 July	21 †	Adele	XL	
5 August	21 †	Adele	XL	
12 August	21 †	Adele	XL	
19 August	Total Madness	Madness	Union Square	
26 August	Hot Cakes	The Darkness	PIAS	
2 September	21 †	Adele	XL	
9 September	21 †	Adele	XL	
16 September	Coexist	The xx	Young Turks	
23 September	Coexist	The xx	Young Turks	
30 September	Coexist	The xx	Young Turks	
7 October	Coexist	The xx	Young Turks	
14 October	Long Wave	Jeff Lynne	Frontiers	
21 October	Broadside	Bellowhead	Navigator	
28 October	Songs from the Movies and More	Daniel O'Donnell	DMG TV	
4 November	The Fire	Matt Cardle	SO What?	
11 November	An Awesome Wave	Alt-J	Infectious	
18 November	The Best of Eva Cassidy	Eva Cassidy	Blix Street Records	
25 November	The Evolution of Man	Example	Ministry of Sound	
2 December	The Best Of	Eva Cassidy	Blix Street	
9 December	The Best Of	Eva Cassidy	Blix Street	
16 December	The Best Of	Eva Cassidy	Blix Street	
23 December	The Best Of	Eva Cassidy	Blix Street	
30 December	Coexist	The xx	Young Turks	

== See also ==
- List of UK Albums Chart number ones of the 2010s
- List of UK Dance Albums Chart number ones of 2012
- List of UK Album Downloads Chart number ones of the 2010s
- List of UK Independent Singles Chart number ones of 2012
- List of UK Independent Singles Chart number ones of 2012
- List of UK R&B Albums Chart number ones of 2012
