= List of UK Dance Albums Chart number ones of 2012 =

These are the Official Charts Company's UK Dance Chart number-one albums of 2012. The dates listed in the menus below represent the Saturday after the Sunday the chart was announced, as per the way the dates are given in chart publications such as the ones produced by Billboard, Guinness, and Virgin.

== Chart history ==
Issue date	Album	Artist(s)	Record label	Ref.
7 January	Xx Twenty Years	Various artists	Ministry of Sound	
14 January	Running Trax Gold	Various artists	Ministry of Sound	
21 January	Bangarang	Skrillex	Asylum	
28 January	The Workout Mix 2012	Various artists	AATW/UMTV	
4 February	Nothing but the Beat	David Guetta	Positiva/Virgin	
11 February	Nothing but the Beat	David Guetta	Positiva/Virgin	
18 February	Nothing but the Beat	David Guetta	Positiva/Virgin	
25 February	Nothing but the Beat	David Guetta	Positiva/Virgin	
3 March	Nothing but the Beat	David Guetta	Positiva/Virgin	
10 March	Nothing but the Beat	David Guetta	Positiva/Virgin	
17 March	Nothing but the Beat	David Guetta	Positiva/Virgin	
24 March	Nothing but the Beat	David Guetta	Positiva/Virgin	
31 March	Nothing but the Beat	David Guetta	Positiva/Virgin	
7 April	Nothing but the Beat	David Guetta	Positiva/Virgin	
14 April	Ultimate Clubland	Various artists	AATW/UMTV	
21 April	Ultimate Clubland	Various artists	AATW/UMTV	
28 April	Ultimate Clubland	Various artists	AATW/UMTV	
5 May	Back to the Old Skool Garage Classics	Various artists	Ministry of Sound	
12 May	Back to the Old Skool Garage Classics	Various artists	Ministry of Sound	
19 May	Back to the Old Skool Garage Classics	Various artists	Ministry of Sound	
26 May	Back to the Old Skool Garage Classics	Various artists	Ministry of Sound	
2 June	Back to the Old Skool Garage Classics	Various artists	Ministry of Sound	
9 June	Back to the Old Skool Garage Classics	Various artists	Ministry of Sound	
16 June	Pacha Ibiza Dance Anthems	Various artists	New State	
23 June	In Our Heads	Hot Chip	Domino	
30 June	In Our Heads	Hot Chip	Domino	
7 July	Clubland 21	Various artists	AATW/UMTV	
14 July	Hed Kandi: Ibiza 10 Years	Various artists	HedKandi	
21 July	The Workout Mix Our Greatest Team	Various artists	AATW/UMTV	
28 July	The Workout Mix Our Greatest Team	Various artists	AATW/UMTV	
4 August	Nothing but the Beat	David Guetta	Positiva/Virgin	
11 August	Godskitchen Ibiza Trance Anthems 2012	Various artists	New State	
18 August	Nothing but the Beat	David Guetta	Positiva/Virgin	
25 August	Ibiza Annual 2012	Various artists	Ministry of Sound	
1 September	Ibiza Annual 2012	Various artists	Ministry of Sound	
8 September	Ibiza Annual 2012	Various artists	Ministry of Sound	
15 September	Ibiza Annual 2012	Various artists	Ministry of Sound	
22 September	Nothing but the Beat 2.0	David Guetta	Positiva/Virgin	
29 September	Nothing but the Beat 2.0	David Guetta	Positiva/Virgin	
6 October	Album Title Goes Here	deadmau5	Mau5trap/Parlophone	
13 October	Nextlevelism	DJ Fresh	Ministry of Sound	
20 October	Addicted to Bass – Winter 2012	Various artists	Ministry of Sound	
27 October	Euphoria: Electronic Dance Music	Various artists	Ministry of Sound	
3 November	Until Now – Swedish House Mafia	Various artists	Virgin	
10 November	18 Months	Calvin Harris	Columbia	
17 November	18 Months	Calvin Harris	Columbia	
24 November	18 Months	Calvin Harris	Columbia	
1 December	The Evolution of Man	Example	Ministry of Sound	
8 December	Anthems 90s	Various artists	Ministry of Sound	
15 December	Anthems 90s	Various artists	Ministry of Sound	
22 December	Anthems 90s	Various artists	Ministry of Sound	
29 December	Anthems 90s	Various artists	Ministry of Sound	

== See also ==
- List of UK Albums Chart number ones of the 2010s
- List of UK Dance Singles Chart number ones of 2012
- List of UK Album Downloads Chart number ones of the 2010s
- List of UK Independent Singles Chart number ones of 2012
- List of UK Independent Singles Chart number ones of 2012
- List of UK R&B Albums Chart number ones of 2012
