= List of UK Dance Singles Chart number ones of 2012 =

The UK Dance Chart is a chart that ranks the biggest-selling singles which are released in the United Kingdom. The chart is compiled by the Official Charts Company and is based on both physical and digital sales of tracks, classified as 'electronic dance'. The dates listed in the menus below represent the Saturday after the Sunday the chart was announced, as per the way the dates are given in chart publications such as the ones produced by Billboard, Guinness, and Virgin.

== Number-ones ==
Key
†	Best-selling dance single of the year

Issue date	Single	Artist(s)	Ref.
7 January	"We Found Love"	Rihanna featuring Calvin Harris	
14 January	"Levels"	Avicii	
21 January	"Levels"	Avicii	
28 January	"Titanium" †	David Guetta featuring Sia	
4 February	"Titanium" †	David Guetta featuring Sia	
11 February ^{[a]}	"Titanium" †	David Guetta featuring Sia	
18 February	"Titanium" †	David Guetta featuring Sia	
25 February ^{[a]}	"Hot Right Now"	DJ Fresh featuring Rita Ora	
3 March	"Hot Right Now"	DJ Fresh featuring Rita Ora	
10 March	"Hot Right Now"	DJ Fresh featuring Rita Ora	
17 March	"Hot Right Now"	DJ Fresh featuring Rita Ora	
24 March	"Elephant"	Alexandra Burke featuring Erick Morillo	
31 March	"Titanium" †	David Guetta featuring Sia	
7 April	"Titanium" †	David Guetta featuring Sia	
14 April	"Titanium" †	David Guetta featuring Sia	
21 April	"Titanium" †	David Guetta featuring Sia	
28 April	"Titanium" †	David Guetta featuring Sia	
5 May	"Let's Go"	Calvin Harris featuring Ne-Yo	
12 May	"Let's Go"	Calvin Harris featuring Ne-Yo	
19 May	"Where Have You Been"	Rihanna	
26 May	"Where Have You Been"	Rihanna	
2 June	"Where Have You Been"	Rihanna	
9 June ^{[a]}	"Feel the Love"	Rudimental featuring John Newman	
16 June	"Feel the Love"	Rudimental featuring John Newman	
23 June	"Feel the Love"	Rudimental featuring John Newman	
30 June	"Feel the Love"	Rudimental featuring John Newman	
7 July	"Feel the Love"	Rudimental featuring John Newman	
14 July	"Feel the Love"	Rudimental featuring John Newman	
21 July	"Feel the Love"	Rudimental featuring John Newman	
28 July	"Feel the Love"	Rudimental featuring John Newman	
4 August	"Feel the Love"	Rudimental featuring John Newman	
11 August ^{[a]}	"Heatwave"	Wiley featuring Ms D	
18 August ^{[a]}	"Heatwave"	Wiley featuring Ms D	
25 August	"Heatwave"	Wiley featuring Ms D	
1 September ^{[a]}	"Bom Bom"	Sam and the Womp	
8 September	"Bom Bom"	Sam and the Womp	
15 September	"Bom Bom"	Sam and the Womp	
22 September	"Bom Bom"	Sam and the Womp	
29 September	"Say Nothing"	Example	
6 October	"Say Nothing"	Example	
13 October	"She Wolf (Falling to Pieces)"	David Guetta featuring Sia	
20 October ^{[a]}	"Don't You Worry Child"	Swedish House Mafia featuring John Martin	
27 October ^{[a]}	"Sweet Nothing"	Calvin Harris featuring Florence Welch	
3 November	"Don't You Worry Child"	Swedish House Mafia featuring John Martin	
10 November	"Can You Hear Me? (Ayayaya)"	Wiley featuring Skepta, JME & Ms D	
17 November	"Don't You Worry Child"	Swedish House Mafia featuring John Martin	
24 November	"Don't You Worry Child"	Swedish House Mafia featuring John Martin	
1 December	"Not Giving In"	Rudimental featuring John Newman & Alex Clare	
8 December	"Don't You Worry Child"	Swedish House Mafia featuring John Martin	
15 December	"Don't You Worry Child"	Swedish House Mafia featuring John Martin	
22 December	"Don't You Worry Child"	Swedish House Mafia featuring John Martin	
29 December	"Don't You Worry Child"	Swedish House Mafia featuring John Martin	

- ^{a} – the single was simultaneously number-one on the singles chart.

== See also ==
- List of UK Singles Chart number ones of the 2010s
- List of UK Dance Albums Chart number ones of 2012
- List of UK Independent Singles Chart number ones of 2012
- List of UK Singles Downloads Chart number ones of the 2000s
- List of UK Rock & Metal Singles Chart number ones of 2012
- List of UK R&B Singles Chart number ones of 2012
