= List of UK Independent Singles Chart number ones of 2012 =

The UK Indie Chart is a chart that ranks the biggest-selling singles which are released in the United Kingdom on independent labels. The Official Charts Company compiled the chart and is based on physical and digital sales of tracks, released independently of any major record labels.

== Summary ==
The year opened to British singer Adele resuming her reign atop the independent releases chart with the number-one single, "Someone Like You" (2011). The song previously topped the chart for eleven non-consecutive weeks in 2011, including a nine-week run from February to April. Marking her twelfth week atop the chart with "Someone Like You," Adele was then dethroned by singer James Vincent McMorrow and his cover of the Steve Winwood song "Higher Love," which rose to success following its inclusion on the 2011/2 LoveFilm advertisement. 15 January saw American singer Lana Del Rey climb to the chart summit with "Video Games," although it was limited to a week at the summit following its exclusion from the independent releases chart. On 22 January, Charlene Soraia returned to the chart summit with her rendition of The Calling's "Wherever You Will Go," having previously spent nine consecutive weeks at the top with the track. The track spent four weeks at the summit, bringing its total to thirteen, before DJ Fresh and the Rita Ora-assisted "Hot Right Now" debuted at number-one on the chart, UK Singles Chart and UK Dance Chart - having sold an incredible 127,998 copies in the seven-day period.

== Chart history ==
Key
†	Best-selling indie single of the year

Issue date	Single	Artist(s)	Sales	Ref.
1 January	"Someone Like You"	Adele	19,015	
8 January	"Higher Love"	James Vincent McMorrow	14,209	
15 January	"Video Games"	Lana Del Rey	17,959	
22 January	"Wherever You Will Go"	Charlene Soraia	—N/a	
29 January	"Wherever You Will Go"	Charlene Soraia	—N/a	
5 February	"Wherever You Will Go"	Charlene Soraia	—N/a	
12 February	"Wherever You Will Go"	Charlene Soraia	—N/a	
19 February ^{[a]}	"Hot Right Now"	DJ Fresh (featuring Rita Ora)	127,998	
26 February	"Hot Right Now"	DJ Fresh (featuring Rita Ora)	61,726	
4 March	"Hot Right Now"	DJ Fresh (featuring Rita Ora)	—N/a	
11 March	"Hot Right Now"	DJ Fresh (featuring Rita Ora)	—N/a	
18 March	"Hot Right Now"	DJ Fresh (featuring Rita Ora)	—N/a	
25 March	"Hot Right Now"	DJ Fresh (featuring Rita Ora)	—N/a	
1 April	"Hot Right Now"	DJ Fresh (featuring Rita Ora)	—N/a	
8 April	"Lady Godiva"	Alex Day	—N/a	
15 April	"Blackout"	Breathe Carolina	—N/a	
22 April	"Hot Right Now"	DJ Fresh (featuring Rita Ora)	—N/a	
29 April	"Hot Right Now"	DJ Fresh (featuring Rita Ora)	—N/a	
6 May	"Hot Right Now"	DJ Fresh (featuring Rita Ora)	—N/a	
13 May	"Higher Love"	James Vincent McMorrow	—N/a	
20 May	"Sweet Disposition"	The Temper Trap	—N/a	
27 May	"Hush Little Baby"	Wretch 32 (featuring Ed Sheeran)	—N/a	
3 June	"Hush Little Baby"	Wretch 32 (featuring Ed Sheeran)	—N/a	
10 June	"The Power"	DJ Fresh (featuring Dizzee Rascal)	—N/a	
17 June	"The Power"	DJ Fresh (featuring Dizzee Rascal)	—N/a	
24 June	"The Power"	DJ Fresh (featuring Dizzee Rascal)	—N/a	
1 July	"The Power"	DJ Fresh (featuring Dizzee Rascal)	—N/a	
8 July	"The Power"	DJ Fresh (featuring Dizzee Rascal)	—N/a	
15 July	"The Power"	DJ Fresh (featuring Dizzee Rascal)	—N/a	
22 July	"Welcome Home"	Radical Face	—N/a	
29 July	Harder Than You Think	Public Enemy	—N/a	
5 August	"Through the Night"	Drumsound & Bassline Smith	—N/a	
12 August	"Through the Night"	Drumsound & Bassline Smith	—N/a	
19 August	"Language"	Porter Robinson	—N/a	
26 August	"Harder Than You Think"	Public Enemy	—N/a	
2 September	"Harder Than You Think"	Public Enemy	—N/a	
9 September	"Harder Than You Think"	Public Enemy	—N/a	
16 September	"Harder Than You Think"	Public Enemy	—N/a	
23 September	"Say Nothing"	Example	—N/a	
30 September	"Say Nothing"	Example	—N/a	
6 October	"Say Nothing"	Example	—N/a	
13 October	"Skyfall" †	Adele		
20 October	"Skyfall" †	Adele		
27 October	"Skyfall" †	Adele		
3 November	"Skyfall" †	Adele		
10 November	"Skyfall" †	Adele		
17 November	"Skyfall" †	Adele		
24 November	"Skyfall" †	Adele		
1 December	"Skyfall" †	Adele		
8 December	"Skyfall" †	Adele		
15 December	"Skyfall" †	Adele		
22 December	"Skyfall" †	Adele		
29 December ^{[a]}	"He Ain't Heavy, He's My Brother"	Justice Collective	—N/a	

== See also ==
- List of UK Singles Chart number ones of the 2010s
- List of UK Dance Singles Chart number ones of 2012
- List of UK Independent Albums Chart number ones of 2012
- List of UK Singles Downloads Chart number ones of the 2000s
- List of UK Rock & Metal Singles Chart number ones of 2012
- List of UK R&B Singles Chart number ones of 2012

== Notes ==
- ^{a} – The single was simultaneously number-one on the singles chart.

== Number-one artists ==
Position	Artist	Weeks at number one
1	DJ Fresh	15
2	Adele	12
3	Public Enemy	5
4	Charlene Soraia	4
5	Example	3
6	Drumsound & Bassline Smith	2
6	James Vincent McMorrow	2
6	Wretch 32	2
7	Alex Day	1
7	Breathe Carolina	1
7	Justice Collective	1
7	Lana Del Rey	1
7	Porter Robinson	1
7	Radical Face	1
7	The Temper Trap	1
