= List of UK Rock & Metal Albums Chart number ones of 2012 =

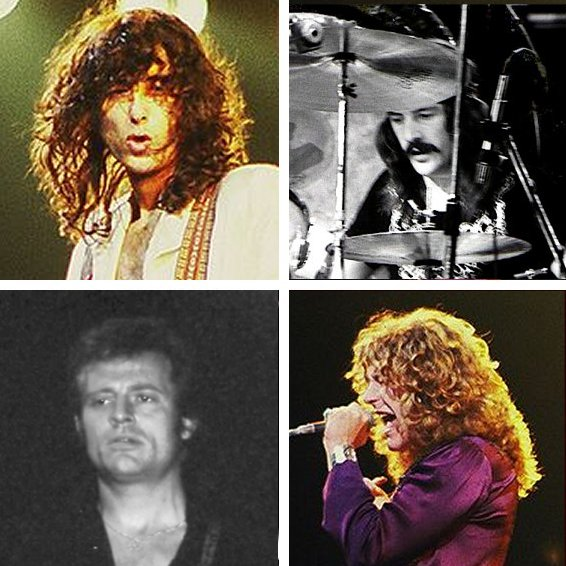
Led Zeppelin's Celebration Day was the longest-running UK Rock & Metal Albums Chart number one of 2012, spending the last five weeks of the year atop the chart.

The UK Rock & Metal Albums Chart is a record chart which ranks the best-selling rock and heavy metal albums in the United Kingdom. Compiled and published by the Official Charts Company, the data is based on each album's weekly physical sales, digital downloads and streams. In 2012, there were 32 albums that topped the 52 published charts. The first number-one album of the year was Wasting Light, the seventh studio album by Foo Fighters, which was released the previous year. The first new number-one album of the year was A Flash Flood of Colour, the third studio album by Enter Shikari. The final number-one album of the year was Led Zeppelin's live album Celebration Day, which reached number one for the week ending 1 December and remained there for five consecutive weeks until the end of the year.

The most successful album on the UK Rock & Metal Albums Chart in 2012 was Led Zeppelin's Celebration Day, which spent the last five weeks of the year at number one. Muse's sixth studio album The 2nd Law spent four weeks at number one and was the best-selling rock and metal album of the year, ranking 32nd in the UK End of Year Albums Chart. Linkin Park's fifth studio album Living Things also spent four weeks at number one in 2012, while three albums – Wasting Light and Greatest Hits by Foo Fighters, and The Gaslight Anthem's fourth studio album Handwritten – were number one for three weeks in 2012. An additional four albums – A Different Kind of Truth by Van Halen, Weapons by Lostprophets, Born Villain by Marilyn Manson and Rize of the Fenix by Tenacious D – each spent two weeks at number one in 2012.

== Chart history ==
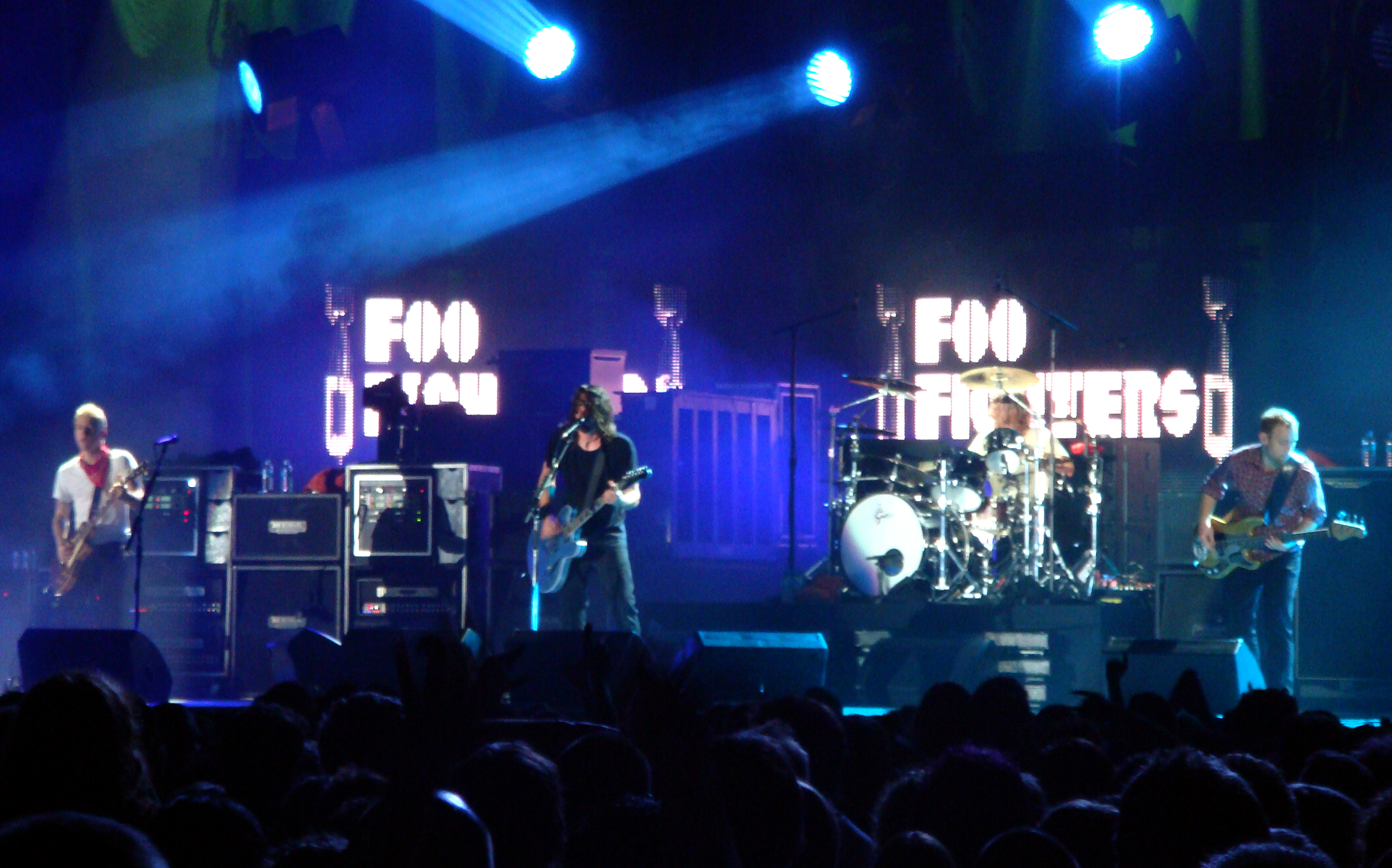
Foo Fighters spent a total of six weeks at number one on the UK Rock & Metal Albums Chart in 2012: both Wasting Light and Greatest Hits spent three weeks atop the chart during the year.

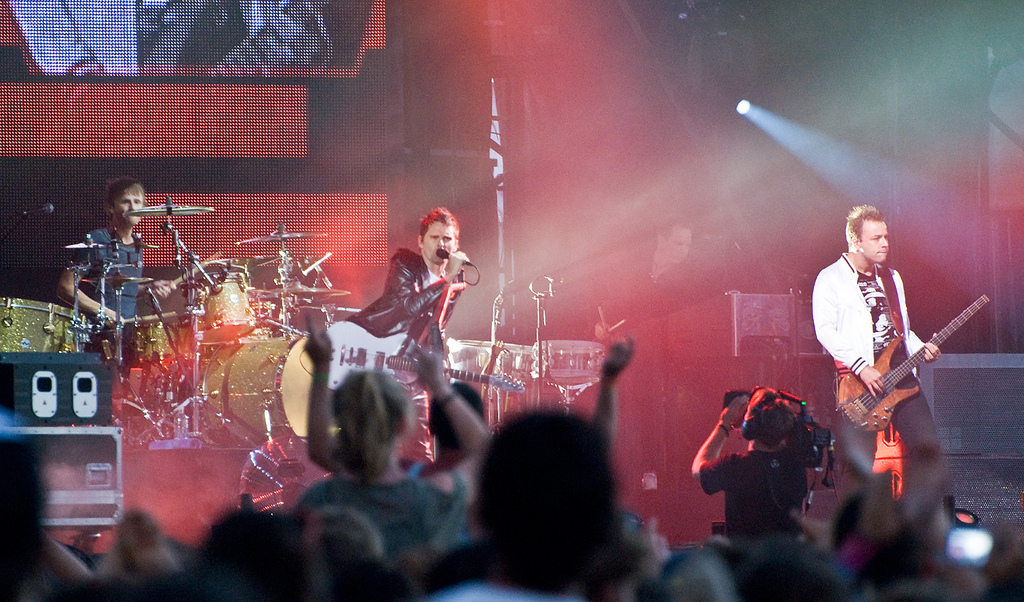
Muse's sixth studio album The 2nd Law spent four weeks at number one in 2012, and was the best-selling rock and metal album of the year in the UK.

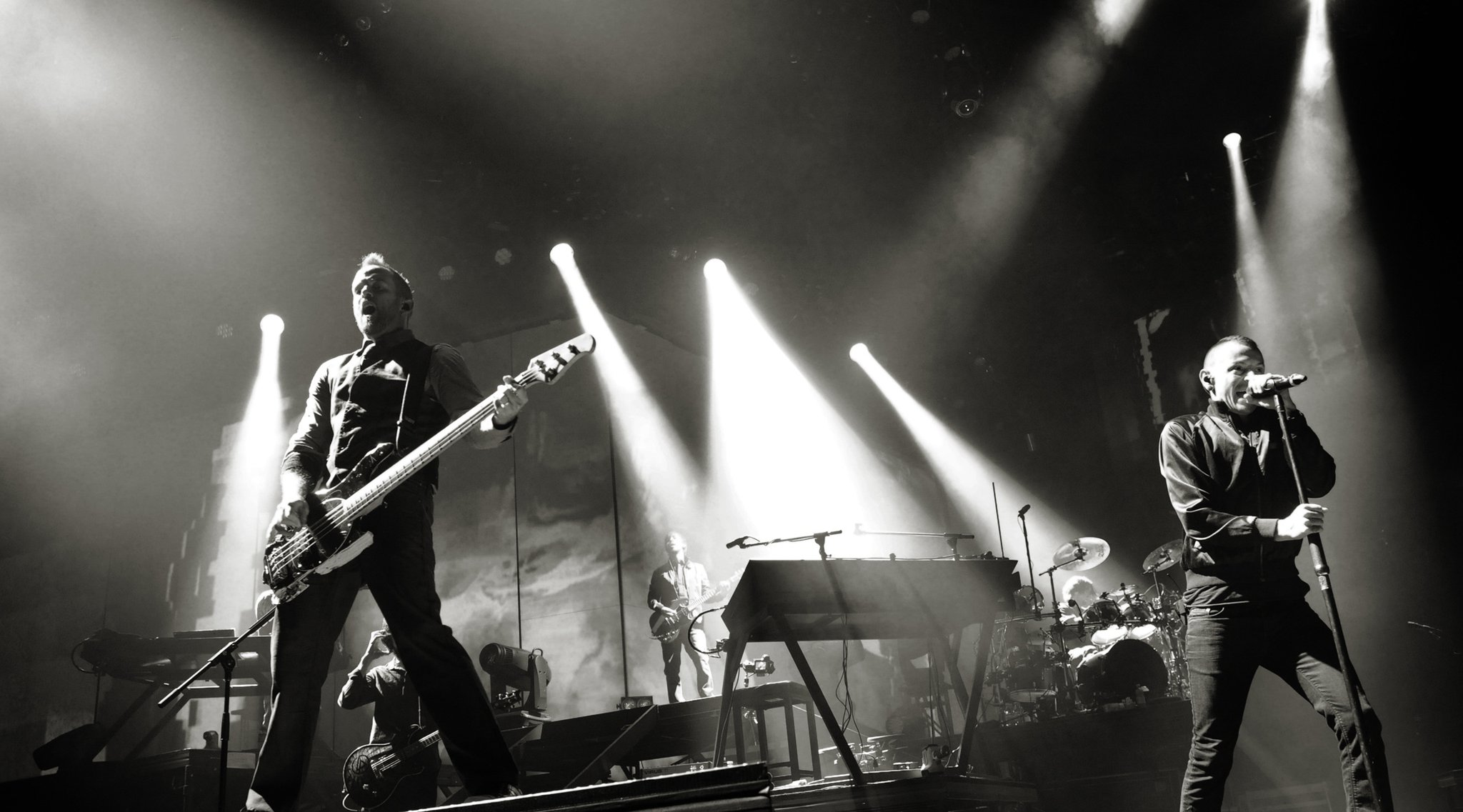
Linkin Park spent four consecutive weeks at number one in 2012 with their fifth studio album Living Things.

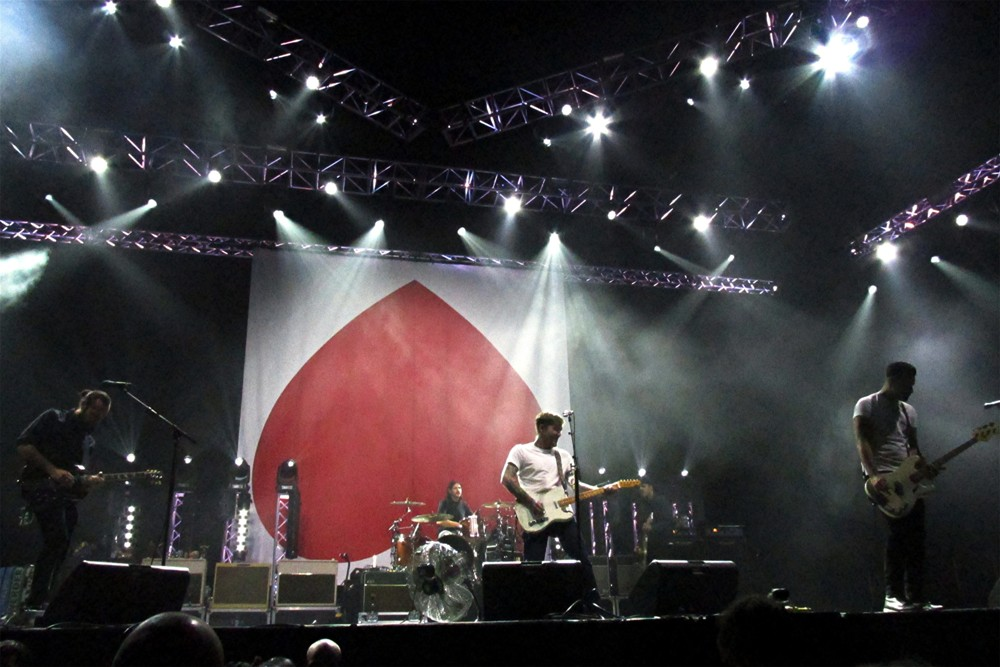
The Gaslight Anthem's fourth studio album Handwritten spent three weeks at number one in August 2012.

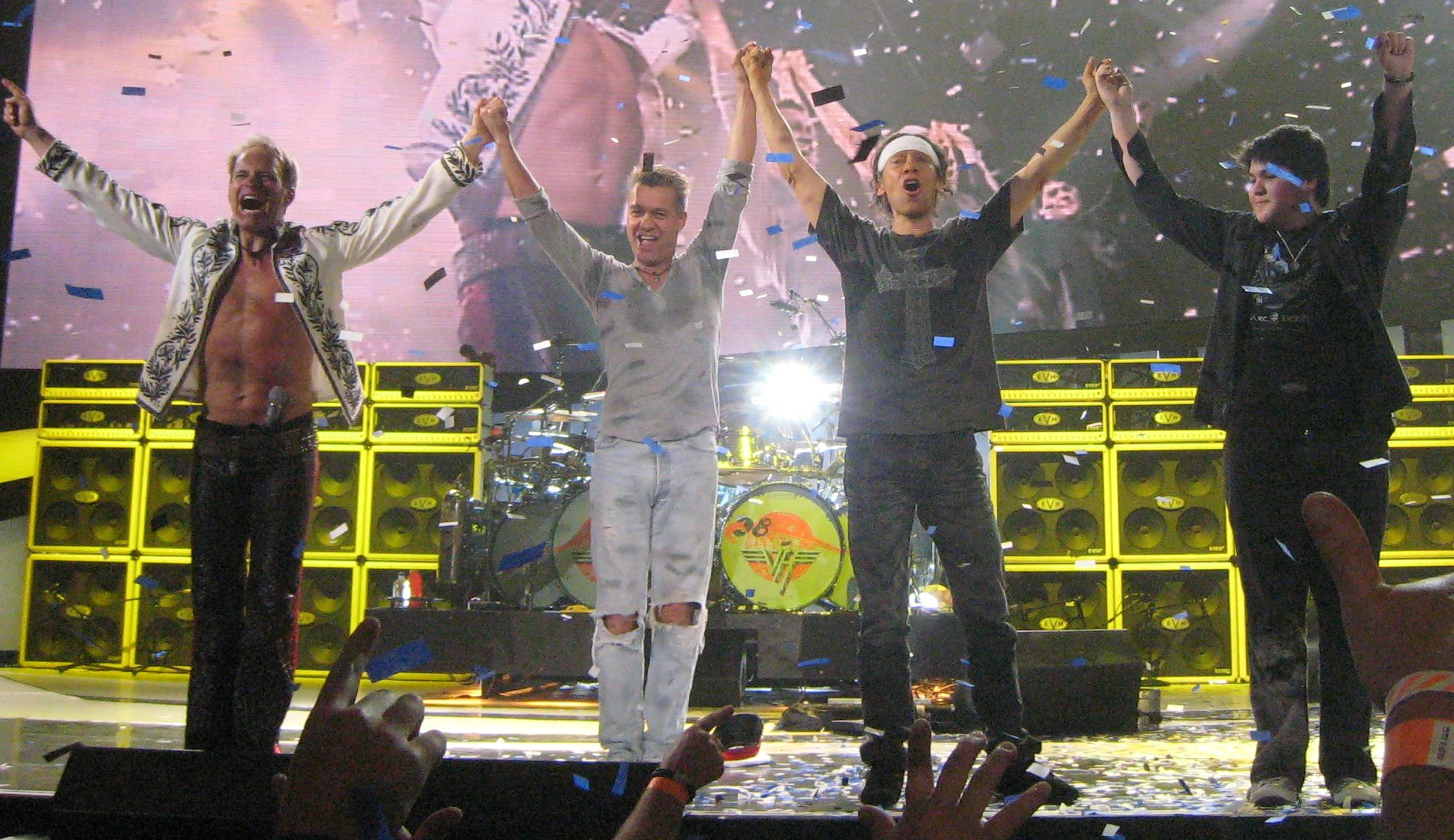
Van Halen spent three weeks at number one in 2012 with the band's twelfth studio album A Different Kind of Truth.

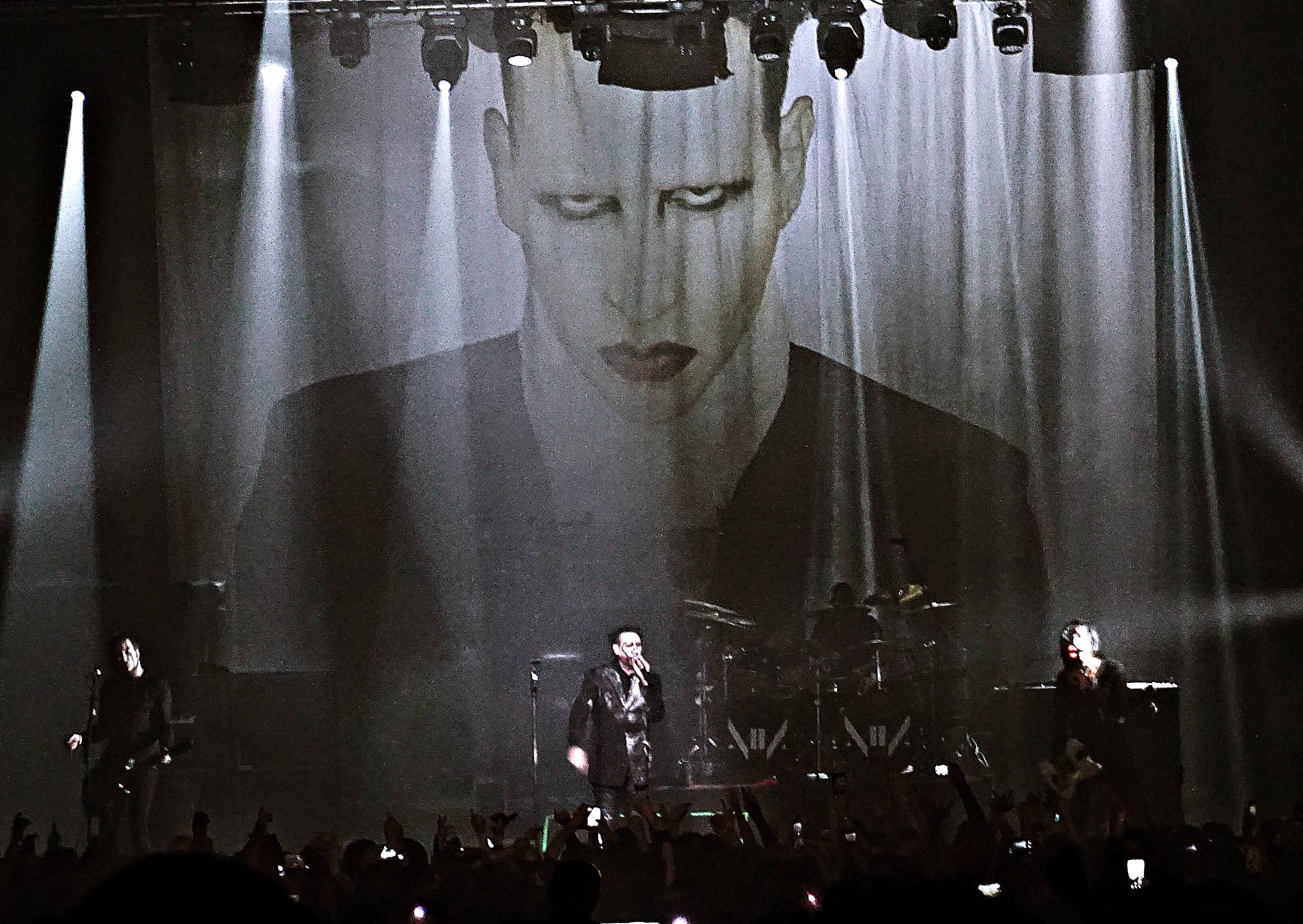
Marilyn Manson's eighth studio album Born Villain reached number one on the UK rock chart for three weeks.

Key
†	Indicates best-selling rock album of 2012

Issue date	Album	Artist(s)	Record label(s)	Ref.
7 January	Wasting Light	Foo Fighters	RCA	
14 January	Greatest Hits	Foo Fighters	RCA	
21 January	Wasting Light	Foo Fighters	RCA	
28 January	A Flash Flood of Colour	Enter Shikari	Ambush Reality	
4 February	Resolution	Lamb of God	Roadrunner	
11 February	Beyond Magnetic	Metallica	Vertigo	
18 February	A Different Kind of Truth	Van Halen	Interscope	
25 February	A Different Kind of Truth	Van Halen	Interscope	
3 March	Wasting Light	Foo Fighters	RCA	
10 March	Seven Deadly	UFO	Steamhammer	
17 March	Ex Lives	Every Time I Die	Epitaph	
24 March	Enslaved	Soulfly	Roadrunner	
31 March	Sinners Never Sleep	You Me at Six	Virgin	
7 April	Amaryllis	Shinedown	Roadrunner	
14 April	Weapons	Lostprophets	Epic	
21 April	Weapons	Lostprophets	Epic	
28 April	The Power Within	DragonForce	Electric Generation	
5 May	Free	Twin Atlantic	Red Bull	
12 May	Born Villain	Marilyn Manson	Cooking Vinyl	
19 May	Born Villain	Marilyn Manson	Cooking Vinyl	
26 May	Rize of the Fenix	Tenacious D	Columbia	
2 June	Choice of Weapon	The Cult	Cooking Vinyl	
9 June	Daybreaker	Architects	Century Media	
16 June	Rize of the Fenix	Tenacious D	Columbia	
23 June	Iron Man: The Best of Black Sabbath	Black Sabbath	Universal	
30 June	Apocalyptic Love	Slash; Myles Kennedy; The Conspirators	Roadrunner	
7 July	Living Things	Linkin Park	Warner Bros.	
14 July	Living Things	Linkin Park	Warner Bros.	
21 July	Living Things	Linkin Park	Warner Bros.	
28 July	Living Things	Linkin Park	Warner Bros.	
4 August	Handwritten	The Gaslight Anthem	Mercury	
11 August	Handwritten	The Gaslight Anthem	Mercury	
18 August	Handwritten	The Gaslight Anthem	Mercury	
25 August	Priorities	Don Broco	Search and Destroy	
1 September	Hot Cakes	The Darkness	PIAS	
8 September	Greatest Hits	Foo Fighters	RCA	
15 September	Greatest Hits	Foo Fighters	RCA	
22 September	Dead Silence	Billy Talent	Atlantic	
29 September	Head Down	Rival Sons	Earache	
6 October	¡Uno!	Green Day	Reprise	
13 October	The 2nd Law †	Muse	Helium 3/Warner Bros.	
20 October	The 2nd Law †	Muse	Helium 3/Warner Bros.	
27 October	The 2nd Law †	Muse	Helium 3/Warner Bros.	
3 November	House of Gold & Bones – Part 1	Stone Sour	Roadrunner	
10 November	The 2nd Law †	Muse	Helium 3/Warner Bros.	
17 November	Music from Another Dimension!	Aerosmith	Columbia	
24 November	¡Dos!	Green Day	Reprise	
1 December	Celebration Day	Led Zeppelin	Atlantic/Rhino/Swan Song	
8 December	Celebration Day	Led Zeppelin	Atlantic/Rhino/Swan Song	
15 December	Celebration Day	Led Zeppelin	Atlantic/Rhino/Swan Song	
22 December	Celebration Day	Led Zeppelin	Atlantic/Rhino/Swan Song	
29 December	Celebration Day	Led Zeppelin	Atlantic/Rhino/Swan Song	

== See also ==
- 2012 in British music
- List of UK Rock & Metal Singles Chart number ones of 2012
