= List of UK Rock & Metal Singles Chart number ones of 2012 =

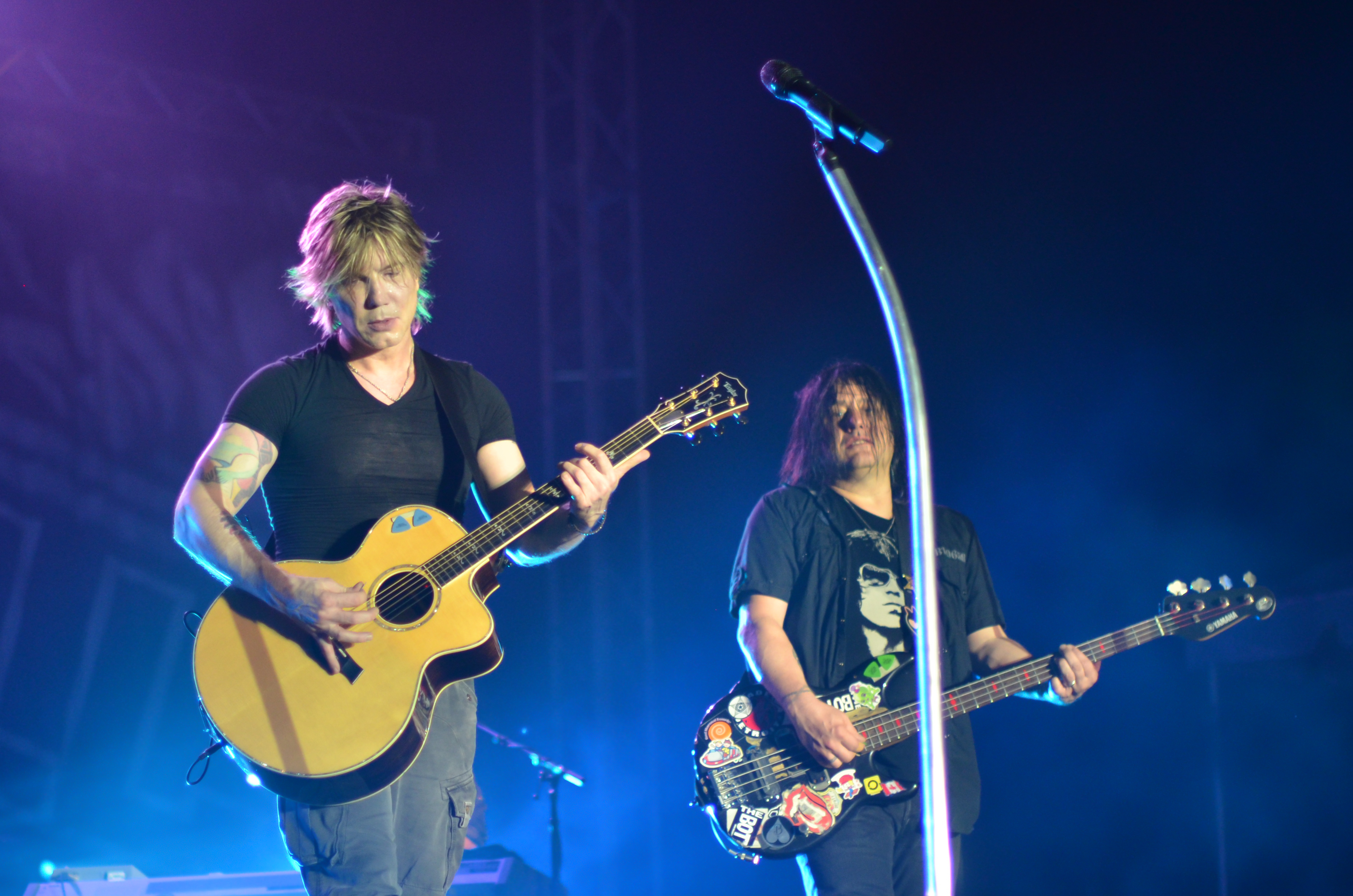
"Iris" by Goo Goo Dolls was the longest-running number-one of 2012, spending 23 weeks atop the chart.

The UK Rock & Metal Singles Chart is a record chart which ranks the best-selling rock and heavy metal songs in the United Kingdom. Compiled and published by the Official Charts Company, the data is based on each track's weekly physical sales, digital downloads and streams. In 2012, there were 14 singles that topped the 52 published charts. The first number-one single of the year was "Iris" by Goo Goo Dolls, which spent the first nine weeks of the year atop the chart. The final number-one single of the year was "The World Is Ugly", the third release from My Chemical Romance's compilation Conventional Weapons.

The most successful song on the UK Rock & Metal Singles Chart in 2012 was "Iris" by Goo Goo Dolls, which spent 23 weeks at number one across ten different spells. Linkin Park spent nine weeks at number one with "Burn It Down" (seven weeks) and "What I've Done" (two weeks), while You Me at Six were number one for five weeks with "The Swarm" (four weeks) and "Reckless" (one week). "Back in Black" by AC/DC was number one for four consecutive weeks in 2012, "Bring Me to Life" by Evanescence spent three weeks atop the chart in two spells, and "45" by The Gaslight Anthem was number one for two weeks in 2012.

== Chart history ==
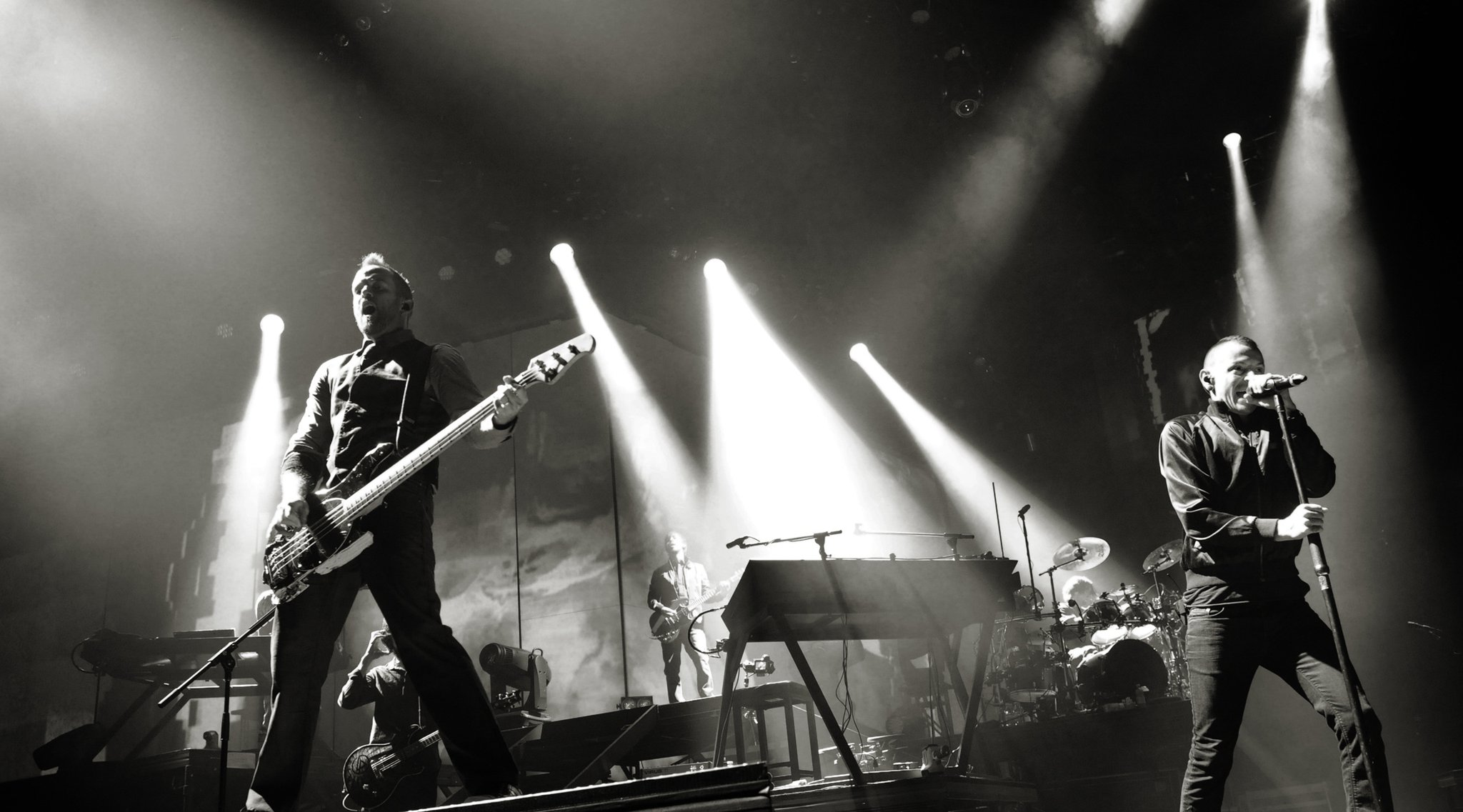
Linkin Park topped the UK Rock & Metal Singles Chart with two singles in 2012: "Burn It Down" (seven weeks) and "What I've Done" (two weeks).

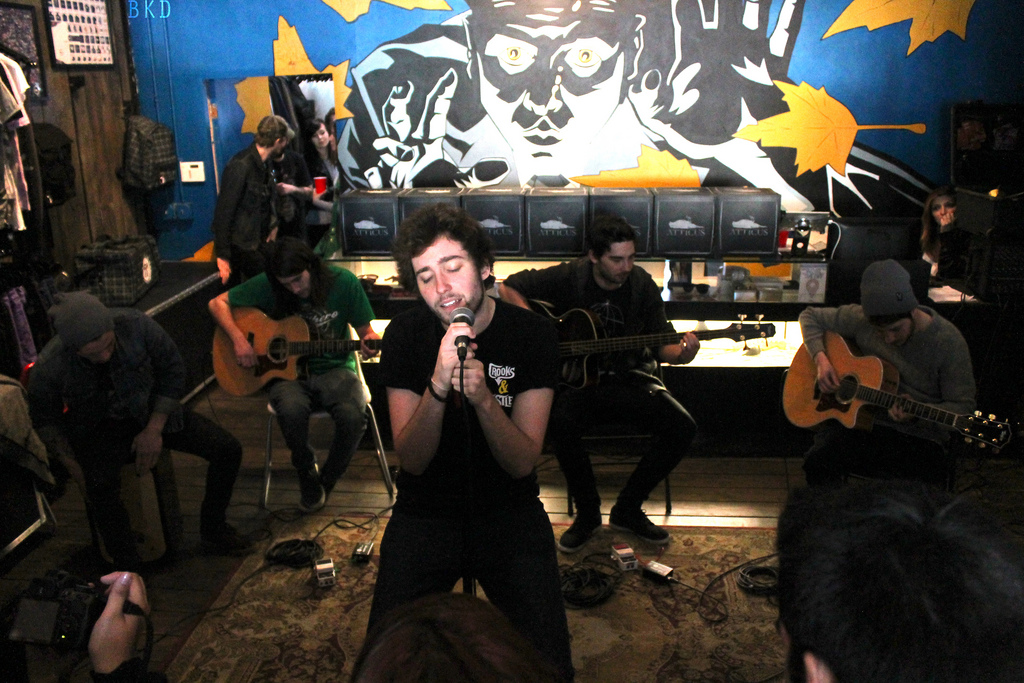
You Me at Six spent five weeks at number one in 2012 – four with "The Swarm" and one with "Reckless".

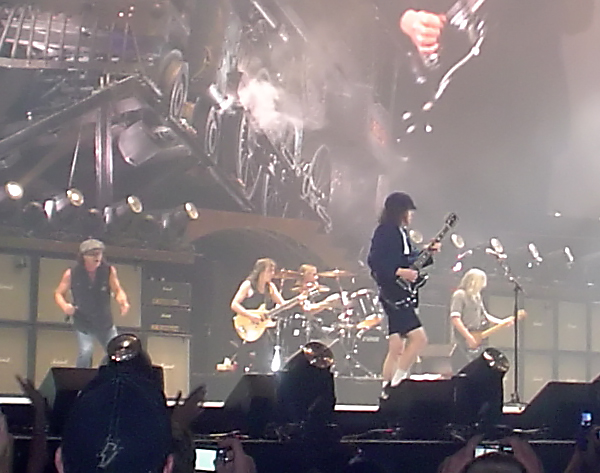
AC/DC topped the chart with "Back in Black" in December, which remained at number one for four weeks.

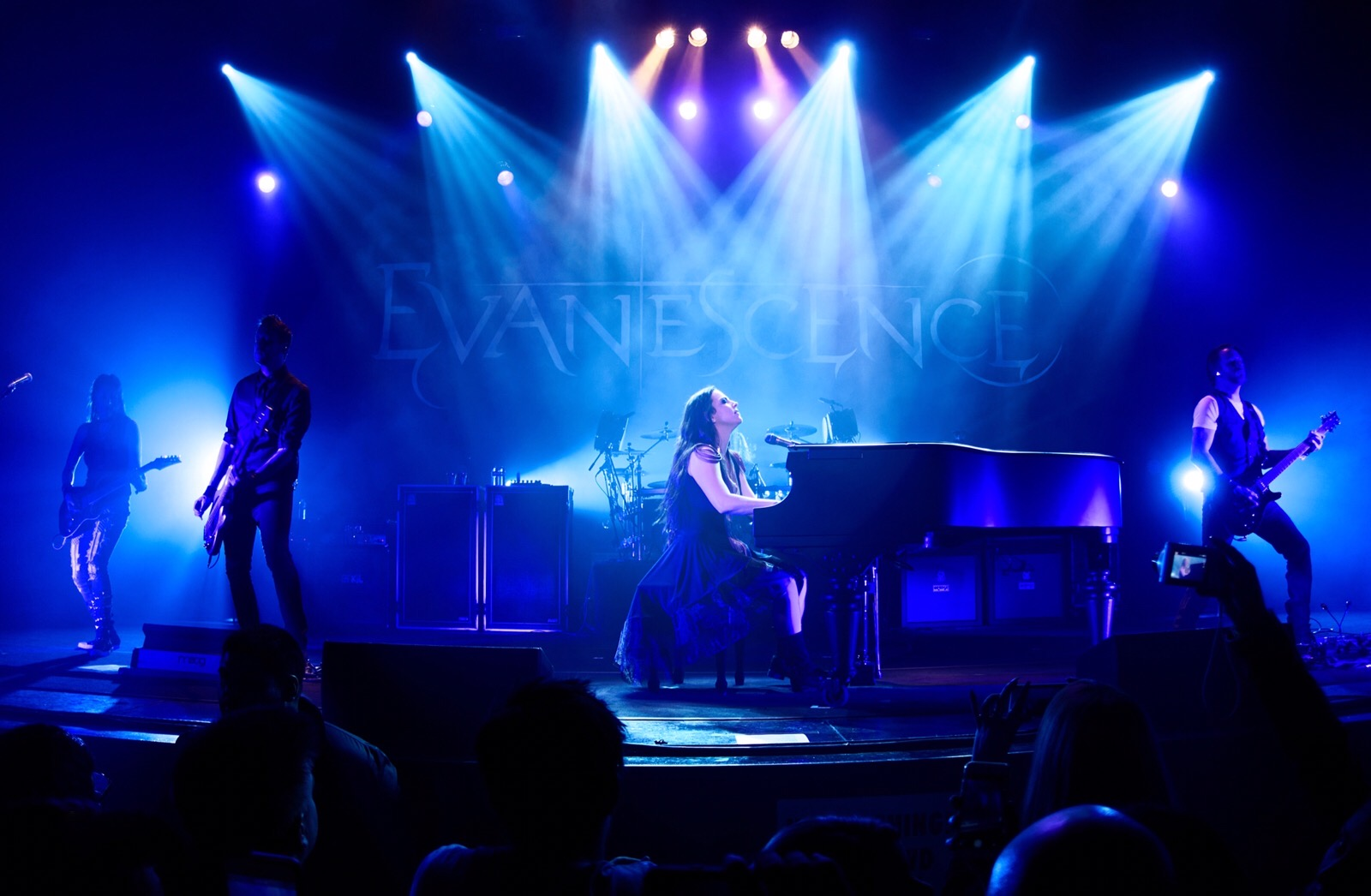
Evanescence's "Bring Me to Life" spent three weeks atop the UK Rock & Metal Singles Chart in 2012.

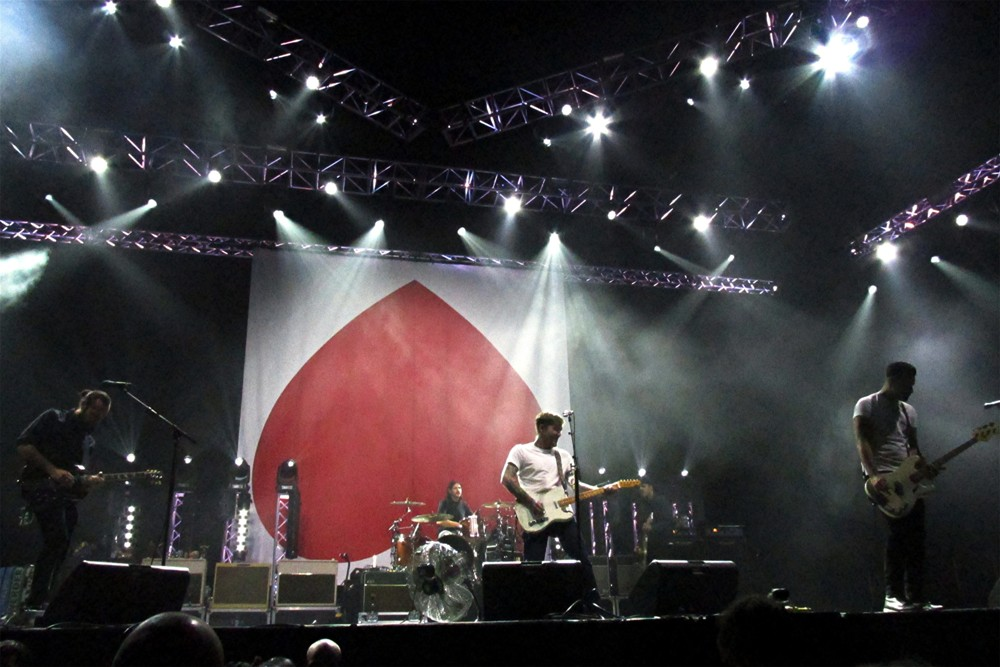
The Gaslight Anthem topped the chart for two weeks in 2012 with "45".

Issue date	Single	Artist(s)	Record label(s)	Ref.
7 January	"Iris"	Goo Goo Dolls	Warner Bros.	
14 January	"Iris"	Goo Goo Dolls	Warner Bros.	
21 January	"Iris"	Goo Goo Dolls	Warner Bros.	
28 January	"Iris"	Goo Goo Dolls	Warner Bros.	
4 February	"Iris"	Goo Goo Dolls	Warner Bros.	
11 February	"Iris"	Goo Goo Dolls	Warner Bros.	
18 February	"Iris"	Goo Goo Dolls	Warner Bros.	
25 February	"Iris"	Goo Goo Dolls	Warner Bros.	
3 March	"Iris"	Goo Goo Dolls	Warner Bros.	
10 March	"Bring Me to Life"	Evanescence	Epic	
17 March	"Iris"	Goo Goo Dolls	Warner Bros.	
24 March	"Livin' on a Prayer"	Bon Jovi	Mercury	
31 March	"The Swarm"	You Me at Six	Virgin	
7 April	"The Swarm"	You Me at Six	Virgin	
14 April	"The Swarm"	You Me at Six	Virgin	
21 April	"The Swarm"	You Me at Six	Virgin	
28 April	"Burn It Down"	Linkin Park	Warner Bros.	
5 May	"Burn It Down"	Linkin Park	Warner Bros.	
12 May	"Burn It Down"	Linkin Park	Warner Bros.	
19 May	"Iris"	Goo Goo Dolls	Warner Bros.	
26 May	"Iris"	Goo Goo Dolls	Warner Bros.	
2 June	"Burn It Down"	Linkin Park	Warner Bros.	
9 June	"Burn It Down"	Linkin Park	Warner Bros.	
16 June	"Iris"	Goo Goo Dolls	Warner Bros.	
23 June	"What I've Done"	Linkin Park	Warner Bros.	
30 June	"What I've Done"	Linkin Park	Warner Bros.	
7 July	"Burn It Down"	Linkin Park	Warner Bros.	
14 July	"Burn It Down"	Linkin Park	Warner Bros.	
21 July	"Iris"	Goo Goo Dolls	Warner Bros.	
28 July	"Iris"	Goo Goo Dolls	Warner Bros.	
4 August	"45"	The Gaslight Anthem	Vertigo	
11 August	"45"	The Gaslight Anthem	Vertigo	
18 August	"Iris"	Goo Goo Dolls	Warner Bros.	
25 August	"Bohemian Rhapsody"	Queen	Island	
1 September	"Iris"	Goo Goo Dolls	Warner Bros.	
8 September	"Paradise City"	Guns N' Roses	Polydor	
15 September	"Iris"	Goo Goo Dolls	Warner Bros.	
22 September	"Iris"	Goo Goo Dolls	Warner Bros.	
29 September	"Somewhere in Neverland"	All Time Low	Hopeless	
6 October	"I Lie Lonely"	Joseph Whelan	Rok	
13 October	"Iris"	Goo Goo Dolls	Warner Bros.	
20 October	"Iris"	Goo Goo Dolls	Warner Bros.	
27 October	"Reckless"	You Me at Six	Virgin	
3 November	"Bring Me to Life"	Evanescence	Epic	
10 November	"Bring Me to Life"	Evanescence	Epic	
17 November	"Iris"	Goo Goo Dolls	Warner Bros.	
24 November	"Iris"	Goo Goo Dolls	Warner Bros.	
1 December	"Back in Black"	AC/DC	Epic	
8 December	"Back in Black"	AC/DC	Epic	
15 December	"Back in Black"	AC/DC	Epic	
22 December	"Back in Black"	AC/DC	Epic	
29 December	"The World Is Ugly"	My Chemical Romance	Reprise	

== See also ==
- 2012 in British music
- List of UK Rock & Metal Albums Chart number ones of 2012
