= List of UK R&B Singles Chart number ones of 2012 =

The logo of the Official Charts Company, responsible for compiling all of the official music charts in the United Kingdom, including the R&B singles chart.

The UK R&B Chart is a weekly chart that ranks the 40 biggest-selling singles and albums that are classified in the R&B genre in the United Kingdom. The chart is compiled by the Official Charts Company, and is based on both physical and digital sales. The following are the number-one singles of 2012.

== Number-one singles ==
Key
†	Best-selling R&B single of the year

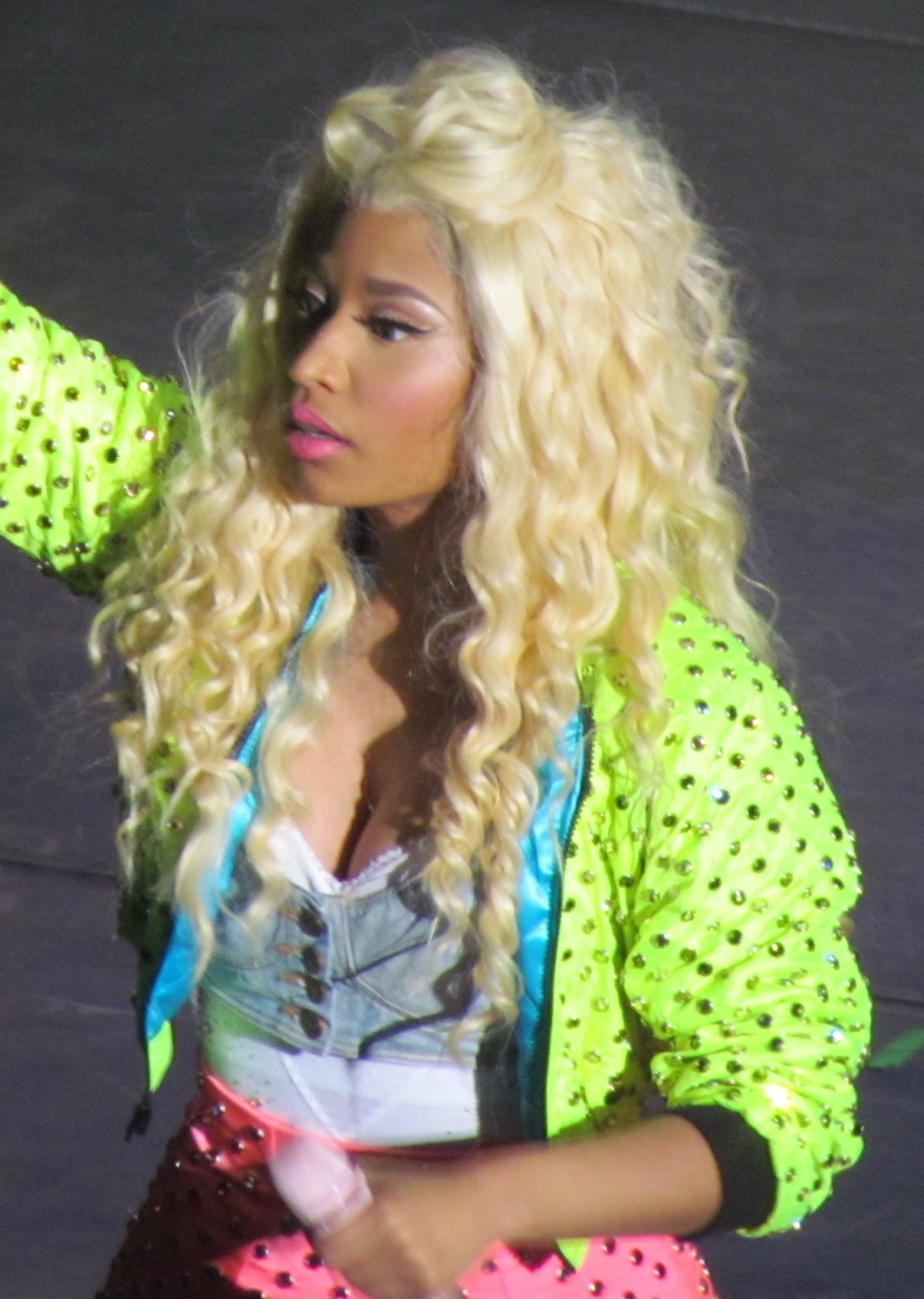
Rapper Nicki Minaj's Starships was the best performing song of 2012.

Issue date	Single	Artist(s)	Ref.
7 January	"Good Feeling"	Flo Rida	
14 January ^{[a]}	"Good Feeling"	Flo Rida	
21 January	"Good Feeling"	Flo Rida	
28 January	"Mama Do the Hump"	Rizzle Kicks	
4 February ^{[b]}	"Mama Do the Hump"	Rizzle Kicks	
11 February	"Wild Ones"	Flo Rida (featuring Sia)	
18 February	"T.H.E. (The Hardest Ever)"	will.i.am (featuring Jennifer Lopez & Mick Jagger)	
25 February	"Wild Ones"	Flo Rida (featuring Sia)	
3 March	"Wild Ones"	Flo Rida (featuring Sia)	
10 March	"Rockstar"	Dappy (featuring Brian May)	
17 March	"Starships" †	Nicki Minaj	
24 March	"Starships" †	Nicki Minaj	
31 March	"Last Time"	Labrinth	
7 April ^{[a]}	"Turn Up the Music"	Chris Brown	
14 April ^{[b]}	"Starships" †	Nicki Minaj	
21 April	"Climax"	Usher	
28 April	"Ordinary People"	John Legend	
5 May	"So Good"	B.o.B	
12 May ^{[b]}	"Starships" †	Nicki Minaj	
19 May ^{[a]}	"R.I.P."	Rita Ora (featuring Tinie Tempah)	
26 May ^{[a]}	"R.I.P."	Rita Ora (featuring Tinie Tempah)	
2 June	"R.I.P."	Rita Ora (featuring Tinie Tempah)	
9 June	"R.I.P."	Rita Ora (featuring Tinie Tempah)	
16 June	"Whistle"	Flo Rida	
23 June	"Whistle"	Flo Rida	
30 June	"Whistle"	Flo Rida	
7 July	"Whistle"	Flo Rida	
14 July	"Whistle"	Flo Rida	
21 July	"Whistle"	Flo Rida	
28 July	"Whistle"	Flo Rida	
4 August	"Whistle"	Flo Rida	
11 August	"Whistle"	Flo Rida	
18 August	"Wonderful"	Angel	
25 August	"Simply Amazing"	Trey Songz	
1 September	"Wonderful"	Angel	
8 September	"Harder Than You Think"	Public Enemy	
15 September ^{[a]}	"Let Me Love You"	Ne-Yo	
22 September	"Let Me Love You"	Ne-Yo	
29 September	"Let Me Love You"	Ne-Yo	
6 October	"I Cry"	Flo Rida	
13 October ^{[a]}	"Diamonds"	Rihanna	
20 October	"Diamonds"	Rihanna	
27 October	"Diamonds"	Rihanna	
3 November ^{[a]}	"Beneath Your Beautiful"	Labrinth (featuring Emeli Sandé)	
10 November	"Beneath Your Beautiful"	Labrinth (featuring Emeli Sandé)	
17 November	"Beneath Your Beautiful"	Labrinth (featuring Emeli Sandé)	
24 November	"Beneath Your Beautiful"	Labrinth (featuring Emeli Sandé)	
1 December	"Beneath Your Beautiful"	Labrinth (featuring Emeli Sandé)	
8 December	"Diamonds"	Rihanna	
15 December	"Beneath Your Beautiful"	Labrinth (featuring Emeli Sandé)	
22 December	"Scream & Shout"	will.i.am (featuring Britney Spears)	
29 December	"Scream & Shout"	will.i.am (featuring Britney Spears)	

== Notes ==
- ^{a} - The album was simultaneously number-one on the UK singles chart.
- ^{b} - The artist was simultaneously number-one on the R&B albums chart.

== See also ==
- List of UK Singles Chart number ones of 2012
- List of UK R&B Albums Chart number ones of 2012
