= List of UK R&B Albums Chart number ones of 2012 =

The logo of the Official Charts Company, responsible for compiling all of the official music charts in the United Kingdom, including the R&B albums chart.

The UK R&B Chart is a weekly chart, first introduced in October 1994, that ranks the 40 biggest-selling singles and albums that are classified in the R&B genre in the United Kingdom. The chart is compiled by the Official Charts Company, and is based on sales of CDs, downloads, vinyl and other formats over the previous seven days.

The following are the number-one albums of 2012.

== Number-one albums ==
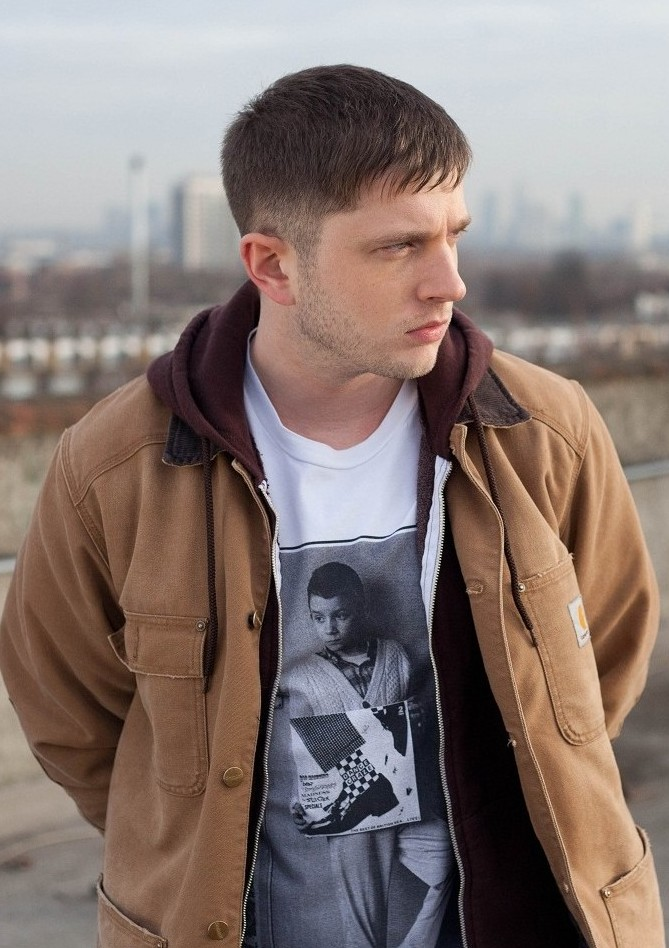
Ben Drew, also known as British rapper Plan B, clocked up 11 non-consecutive weeks at number one with his sophomore effort, ill Manors, including an eight-week consecutive streak stretching from the beginning of September through to early November.

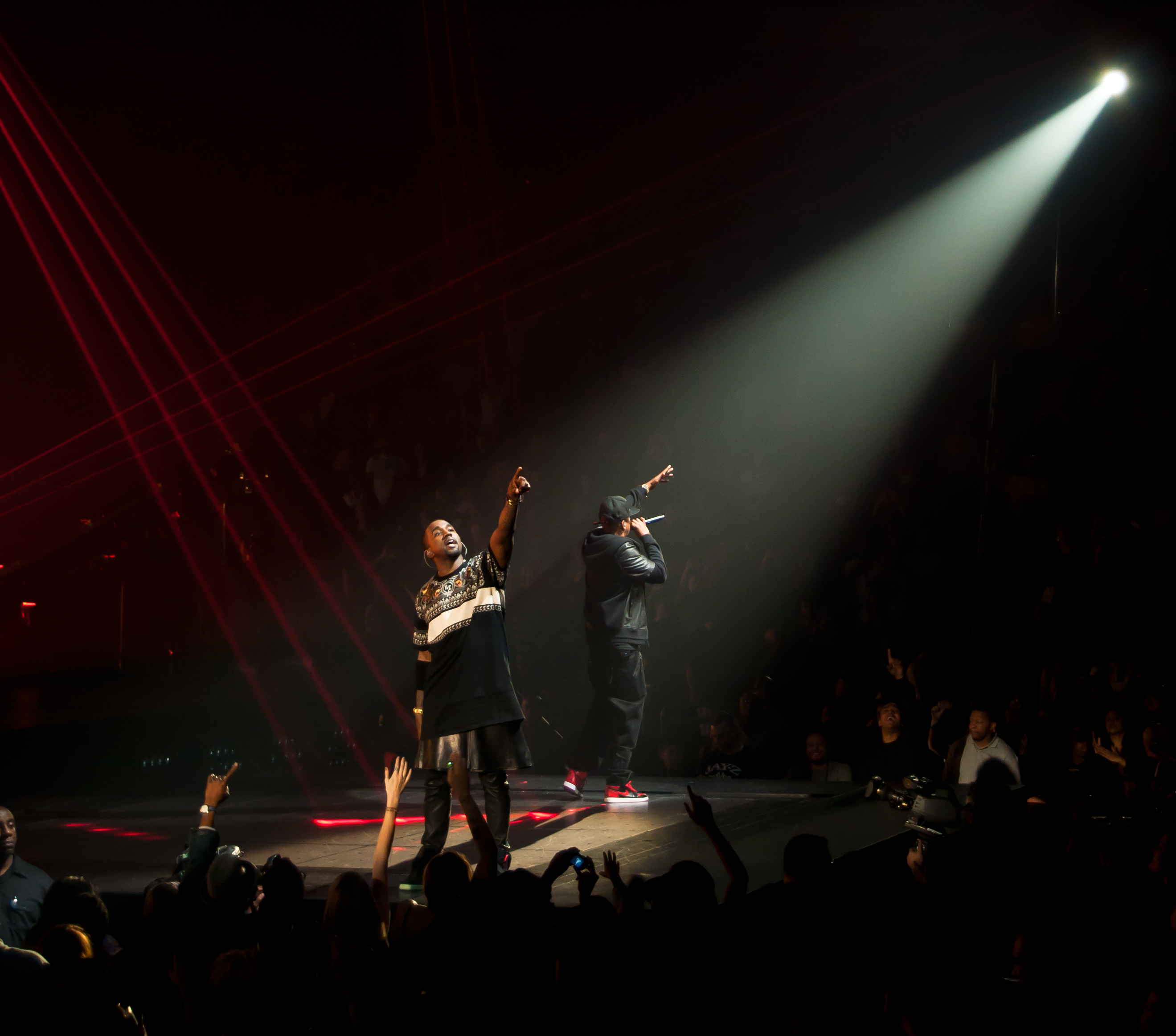
Watch the Throne by Jay-Z and Kanye West enjoyed a total of six non-consecutive weeks at the top spot in 2012. Paired with the two weeks they spent at number-one in 2011, this gives the album a total of eight weeks atop the UK R&B albums chart.

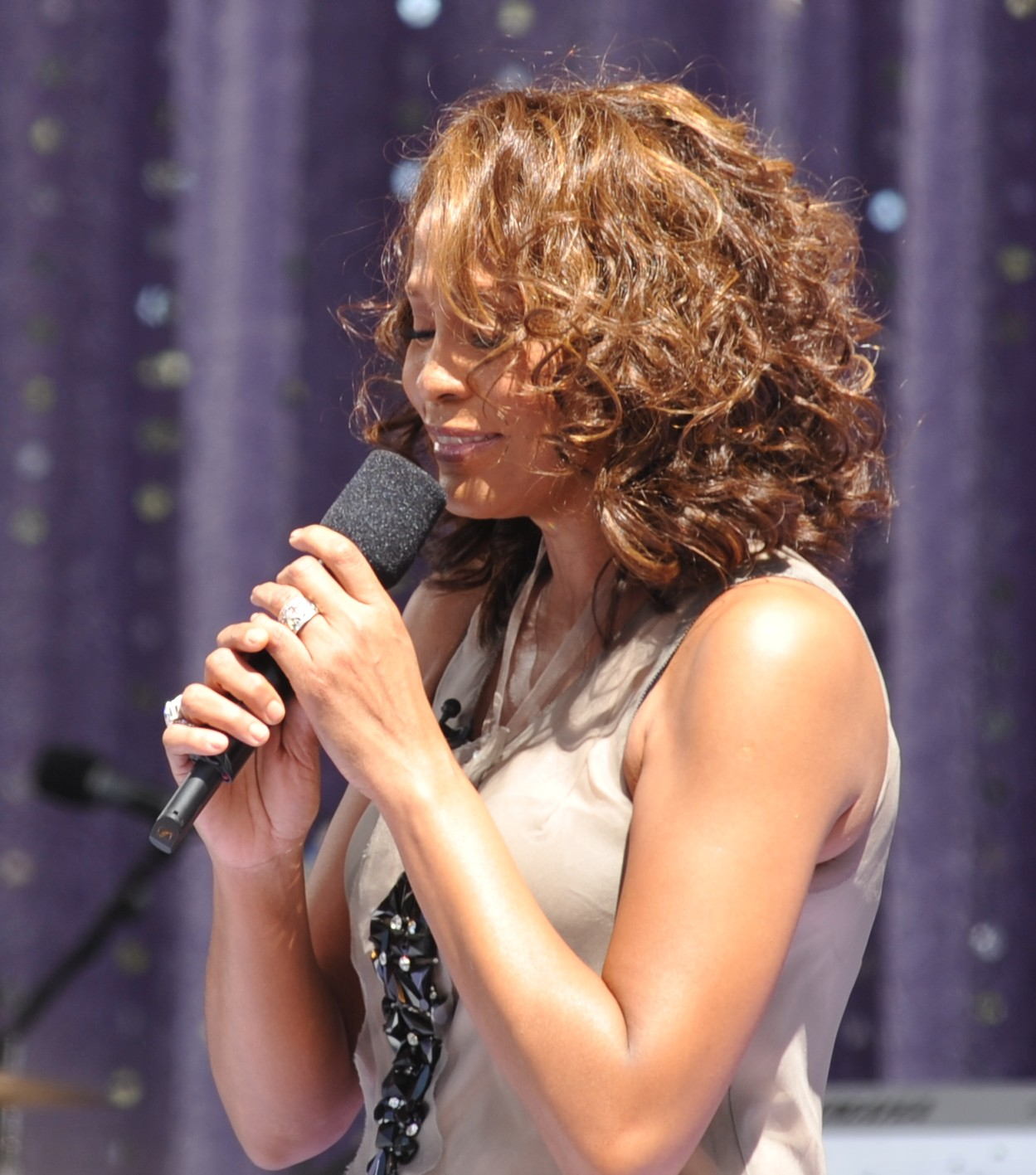
Whitney Houston's compilation album, The Ultimate Collection, held the number-one spot for two weeks following her death in February.

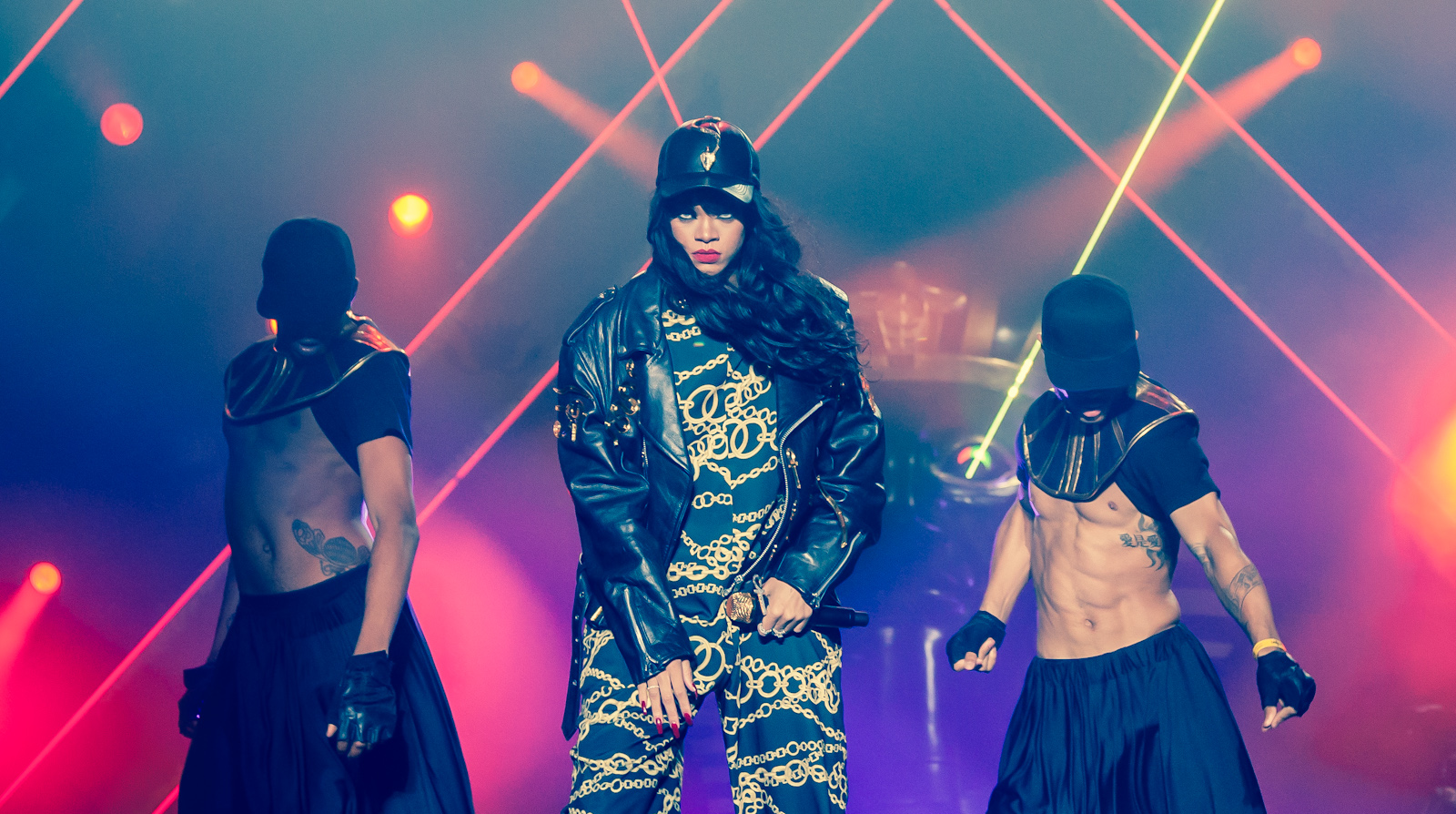
Rihanna's two number-one albums this year, Talk That Talk and Unapologetic held the top spot for a total of nine weeks, making her the female with the most weeks at number-one in 2012.

| Issue Date | Album | Artist | Record label | Ref. |
|---|---|---|---|---|
| 7 January | Talk That Talk | Rihanna | Def Jam/SRP | |
| 14 January | 4 | Beyoncé | Parkwood/Columbia | |
| 21 January | 4 | Beyoncé | Parkwood/Columbia | |
| 28 January | 4 | Beyoncé | Parkwood/Columbia | |
| 4 February ^{[b]} | Stereo Typical | Rizzle Kicks | Island | |
| 11 February | Stereo Typical | Rizzle Kicks | Island | |
| 18 February | Stereo Typical | Rizzle Kicks | Island | |
| 25 February | The Ultimate Collection | Whitney Houston | Arista | |
| 3 March | The Ultimate Collection | Whitney Houston | Arista | |
| 10 March | Watch the Throne | Jay-Z & Kanye West | Roc-A-Fella / Roc Nation / Def Jam | |
| 17 March | Watch the Throne | Jay-Z & Kanye West | Roc-A-Fella / Roc Nation / Def Jam | |
| 24 March | One R&B | Various Artists | Ministry of Sound | |
| 31 March | Watch the Throne | Jay-Z & Kanye West | Roc-A-Fella / Roc Nation / Def Jam | |
| 7 April | Talk That Talk | Rihanna | Def Jam/SRP | |
| 14 April ^{[a]}^{[b]} | Pink Friday: Roman Reloaded | Nicki Minaj | Young Money Entertainment / Cash Money / Universal Republic | |
| 21 April | Pink Friday: Roman Reloaded | Nicki Minaj | Young Money Entertainment / Cash Money / Universal Republic | |
| 28 April | Pink Friday: Roman Reloaded | Nicki Minaj | Young Money Entertainment / Cash Money / Universal Republic | |
| 5 May | Pink Friday: Roman Reloaded | Nicki Minaj | Young Money Entertainment / Cash Money / Universal Republic | |
| 12 May ^{[b]} | Pink Friday: Roman Reloaded | Nicki Minaj | Young Money Entertainment / Cash Money / Universal Republic | |
| 19 May | Strange Clouds | B.o.B | Grand Hustle / Rebel Rock / Atlantic | |
| 26 May | Talk That Talk | Rihanna | Def Jam/SRP | |
| 2 June | Watch The Throne | Jay-Z & Kanye West | Roc-A-Fella / Roc Nation / Def Jam | |
| 9 June | Watch The Throne | Jay-Z & Kanye West | Roc-A-Fella / Roc Nation / Def Jam | |
| 16 June | Talk That Talk | Rihanna | Def Jam/SRP | |
| 23 June | Looking 4 Myself | Usher | RCA | |
| 30 June | Looking 4 Myself | Usher | RCA | |
| 7 July | Watch the Throne | Jay-Z & Kanye West | Roc-A-Fella / Roc Nation / Def Jam | |
| 14 July ^{[a]} | Fortune | Chris Brown | RCA | |
| 21 July | channel ORANGE | Frank Ocean | Def Jam | |
| 28 July | channel ORANGE | Frank Ocean | Def Jam | |
| 4 August ^{[a]} | ill Manors | Plan B | Atlantic | |
| 11 August | ill Manors | Plan B | Atlantic | |
| 18 August | R&B Summerjamz | Various Artists | Universal Music TV | |
| 25 August | ill Manors | Plan B | Atlantic | |
| 1 September | Chapter V | Trey Songz | Songbook / Atlantic | |
| 8 September | ill Manors | Plan B | Atlantic | |
| 15 September | ill Manors | Plan B | Atlantic | |
| 22 September | ill Manors | Plan B | Atlantic | |
| 29 September | ill Manors | Plan B | Atlantic | |
| 6 October | ill Manors | Plan B | Atlantic | |
| 13 October | ill Manors | Plan B | Atlantic | |
| 20 October | ill Manors | Plan B | Atlantic | |
| 27 October | ill Manors | Plan B | Atlantic | |
| 3 November | Bad Intentions | Dappy | Takeover / Island | |
| 10 November | Electronic Earth | Labrinth | Syco Music | |
| 17 November | Evolution | JLS | RCA | |
| 24 November | Evolution | JLS | RCA | |
| 1 December ^{[a]} | Unapologetic | Rihanna | Def Jam/SRP | |
| 8 December ^{[b]} | Unapologetic | Rihanna | Def Jam/SRP | |
| 15 December | Unapologetic | Rihanna | Def Jam/SRP | |
| 22 December | Unapologetic | Rihanna | Def Jam/SRP | |
| 29 December | Unapologetic | Rihanna | Def Jam/SRP | |

== Notes ==
- ^{a} - The album was simultaneously number-one on the UK albums chart.
- ^{b} - The artist was simultaneously number-one on the R&B singles chart.

== See also ==
- List of UK Albums Chart number ones of 2012
- List of UK R&B Chart number-one singles of 2012
