= You Me at Six discography =

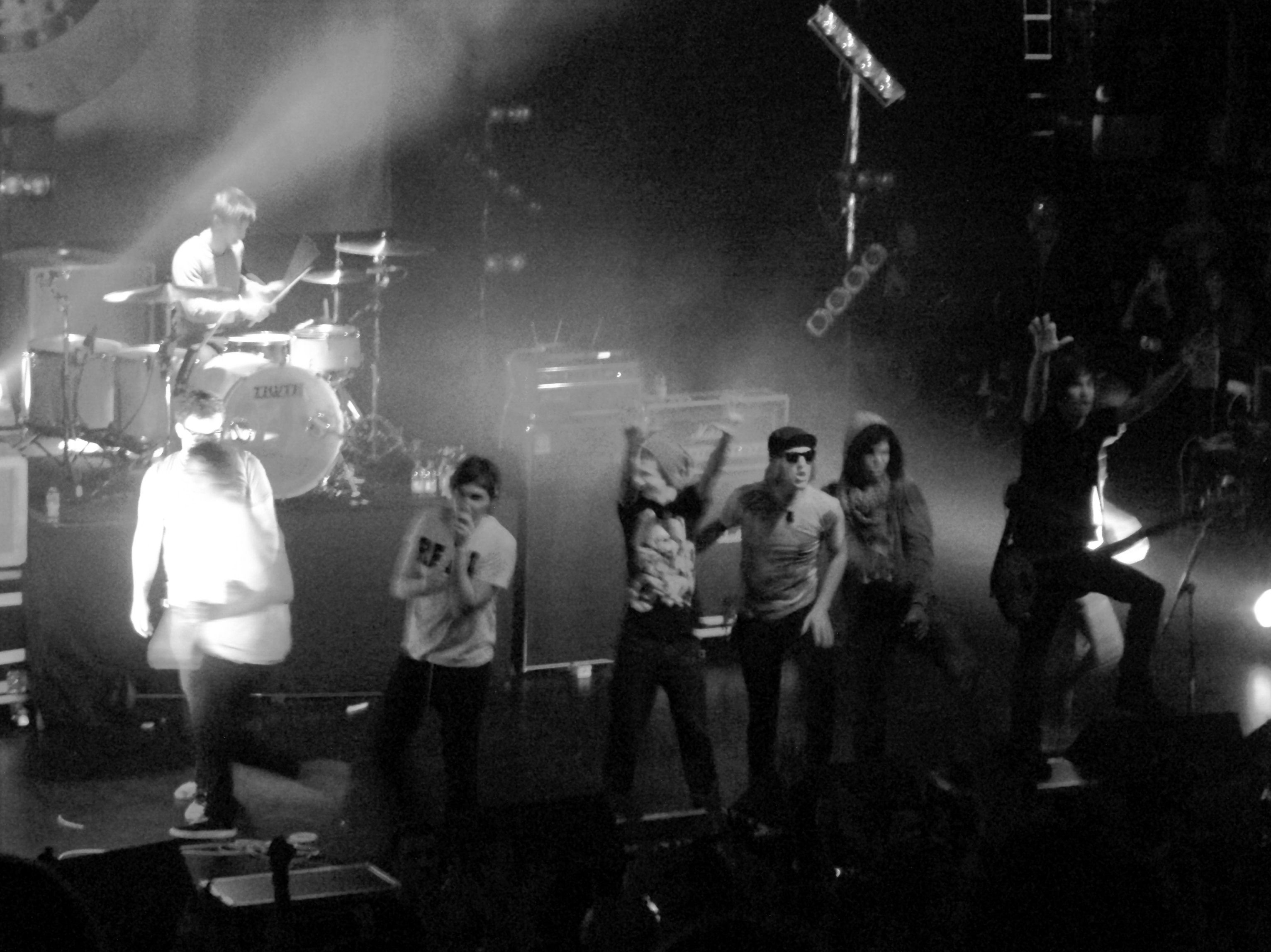
- Studio albums: 8
- Extended plays: 7
- Live albums: 1
- Singles: 43
- Music videos: 32

The discography of You Me at Six, an English rock band, consists of eight studio albums, one live album, seven extended plays, forty-three singles and thirty-two music videos.

== Albums ==
=== Studio albums ===
List of albums, with chart positions and certifications
Title	Album details	Peak chart positions						Certifications
Title	Album details	UK	AUS	GER	IRE	SCO	US	Certifications
Take Off Your Colours	Released: 6 October 2008; Label: Slam Dunk (SLAMD005); Format: CD, DL, LP	25	—	—	—	—	—	BPI: Gold
Hold Me Down	Released: 11 January 2010; Label: Virgin (V3071); Format: CD, DL	5	—	—	24	5	—	BPI: Gold
Sinners Never Sleep	Released: 3 October 2011; Label: Virgin (V3093); Format: CD, CD+DVD-V, DL, LP	3	28	—	39	2	—	BPI: Gold
Cavalier Youth	Released: 27 January 2014; Label: BMG (538012062); Format: CD, CD+DVD-V, DL, LP	1	14	85	27	1	124	BPI: Gold
Night People	Released: 6 January 2017; Label: Infectious (INFECT345); Format: CD, CS, DL, LP	3	20	—	—	3	—	
VI	Released: 5 October 2018; Label: Underdog, AWAL; Format: CD, CS, DL, LP	6	73	—	—	8	—	
Suckapunch	Released: 15 January 2021; Label: Underdog, AWAL; Format: CD, CS, DL, LP	1	—	54	—	1	—	
Truth Decay	Released: 10 February 2023; Label: Underdog, AWAL, Rise; Format: CD, CS, DL, LP	4	—	—	—	2	—	
"—" denotes album that did not chart or was not released

=== Live albums ===
Title	Album details
The Final Night of Sin at Wembley Arena	Released: 25 March 2013; Label: Virgin; Format: CD+DVD-V, DL

=== Extended plays ===
Title	EP details
We Know What It Means to Be Alone	Released: 2006; Label: Self-released; Format: CD, DL
Untitled	Released: 2007; Label: Self-released; Format: CD, DL
Kiss and Tell EP	Released: 2009; Label: Slam Dunk; Format: CD, DL
Liquid Confidence	Released: 2010; Label: Virgin; Format: CD, DL
Live from Gunnersville	Released: 2021; Label: Underdog, AWAL; Format: CD
heartLESS	Released: 2022; Label: Underdog, AWAL; Format: DL
Live from Alexandra Palace	Released: 18 August 2023; Label: Underdog, AWAL, Rise; Format: DL

== Singles ==
List of singles, with chart positions, showing year released and album name
Single	Year	Peak chart positions						Certifications	Album
Single	Year	UK	UK Rock	IRE	SCO	US Alt.	US Main.	Certifications	Album
"Save It for the Bedroom"	2007	—	2	—	—	—	—		Non-album single
"If I Were in Your Shoes"	2008	—	3	—	—	—	—		Take Off Your Colours
"Gossip"	2008	—	—	—	—	—	—		Take Off Your Colours
"Jealous Minds Think Alike"	2008	100	2	—	—	—	—		Take Off Your Colours
"Save It for the Bedroom"	2009	145	—	—	—	—	—		Take Off Your Colours
"Finders Keepers"	2009	33	—	—	—	—	—		Take Off Your Colours
"Kiss and Tell"	2009	42	—	—	—	—	—		Take Off Your Colours
"Underdog"	2010	49	—	—	35	—	—	BPI: Gold	Hold Me Down
"Liquid Confidence"	2010	86	—	—	—	—	—		Hold Me Down
"Stay with Me"	2010	52	2	—	—	—	—	BPI: Silver	Hold Me Down
"Rescue Me" (featuring Chiddy)	2011	21	—	50	16	—	—		Breakfast
"Loverboy"	2011	39	2	—	31	—	—		Sinners Never Sleep
"Bite My Tongue" (featuring Oliver Sykes)	2011	124	4	—	—	—	—	BPI: Silver	Sinners Never Sleep
"The Swarm"	2012	23	1	—	—	—	—		Non-album single
"No One Does It Better"	2012	92	—	—	—	—	—		Sinners Never Sleep
"Reckless"	2012	131	1	—	—	—	—		Sinners Never Sleep
"Lived a Lie"	2013	11	1	84	9	—	—		Cavalier Youth
"Fresh Start Fever"	2013	46	1	—	—	—	—		Cavalier Youth
"Cold Night"	2014	171	2	—	—	—	—		Cavalier Youth
"Room to Breathe"	2014	182	4	—	—	40	4		Cavalier Youth
"Forgive and Forget"	2014	—	32	—	—	—	—		Cavalier Youth
"Win Some, Lose Some"	2015	—	—	—	—	—	—		Cavalier Youth
"Night People"	2016	—	4	—	—	—	—		Night People
"Plus One"	2016	—	24	—	—	—	—		Night People
"Give"	2016	—	5	—	—	—	—		Night People
"Swear"	2016	—	19	—	—	—	—		Night People
"Heavy Soul"	2016	—	17	—	—	—	—		Night People
"Take on the World"	2017	—	1	—	—	—	—	BPI: Silver	Night People
"Fast Forward"	2018	—	—	—	—	—	—		VI
"3AM"	2018	—	—	—	—	—	—		VI
"I O U"	2018	—	19	—	—	—	—		VI
"Back Again"	2018	—	—	—	—	—	—		VI
"Straight to My Head"	2018	—	—	—	—	—	—		VI
"What's It Like"	2019	—	—	—	—	—	—		Suckapunch
"Make Me Feel Alive"	2020	—	—	—	—	—	—		Suckapunch
"Beautiful Way"	2020	—	—	—	—	—	—		Suckapunch
"Suckapunch"	2020	—	—	—	—	—	—		Suckapunch
"Adrenaline"	2020	—	—	—	—	—	—		Suckapunch
"Deep Cuts"	2022	—	—	—	—	—	—		Truth Decay
"No Future? Yeah Right" (featuring Rou Reynolds)	2022	—	—	—	—	—	—		Truth Decay
"Mixed Emotions (I Didn't Know How to Tell You What I Was Going Through)"	2022	—	—	—	—	—	—		Truth Decay
"Heartless"	2022	—	—	—	—	—	—		Truth Decay
"My Dopamine"	2023	—	—	—	—	—	—		Truth Decay
"God Bless the 90s Kids"	2023	—	—	—	—	—	—		Truth Decay
"—" denotes single that did not chart or was not released in that territory.

== Other charted songs ==
Song	Year	Peak	Album
Song	Year	UK	Album
"Starry Eyed"	2010	104	"Stay with Me"
"Knew It Was You"	2011	154	"Rescue Me"
"Takes One to Know One"	2011	192	Sinners Never Sleep
"Hope for the Best"	2013	75	Cavalier Youth

== Other appearances ==
Title	Year	Album
"Loverboy" (live from Kerrang! Radio)	2011	The Hottest Rock Tracks of 2011
"Are We the Waiting" (Green Day cover)	2014	Kerrang! Does Green Day's American Idiot
"Kings and Queens" (Thirty Seconds to Mars cover)	2015	Rock Sound Worship and Tributes

== Music videos ==
Year	Title	Director
2007	"Save It for the Bedroom" (original release)	Lawrence Hardy
2008	"If I Were in Your Shoes"	Lawrence Hardy
2008	"Gossip"	Greg Allan
2008	"Jealous Minds Think Alike"	Shane Davey
2009	"Save It for the Bedroom" (re-release)	Shane Davey
2009	"Finders Keepers"	Nick Bartlett
2009	"Kiss and Tell"	James Copeman
2010	"The Consequence"	Lawrence Hardy
2010	"Underdog"	Nick Bartlett
2010	"Liquid Confidence"	Adam Powell
2010	"Stay with Me"	Frank Borin
2011	"Rescue Me" (feat. Chiddy Bang)	James Lees
2011	"Loverboy"	Tim Mattia
2011	"Bite My Tongue" (featuring Oliver Sykes)	Tim Mattia
2012	"No One Does It Better"	Tim Mattia
2012	"Reckless"	-
2013	"Lived a Lie"	Remy Dance
2013	"Fresh Start Fever"	Rollo
2014	"Room to Breathe"	Tom Welsh
2014	"Cold Night"	-
2016	"Night People"	Ryan Vernava, Liam Achaibu
2016	"Swear"	-
2017	"Give"	-
2018	"3AM"	Daniel James Broadley
2018	"Back Again"	Daniel James Broadley
2019	"I O U"	-
2019	"What It's Like"	-
2020	"Make Me Feel Alive"	-
2020	"Beautiful Way"	Cass Virdee
2020	"Suckapunch"	Cass Virdee
2022	"Deep Cuts"	Static Dress
2022	"Heartless"	
