= Final Nights of Six =

2024–25 concert tour by You Me at Six

The Final Nights of Six
- World tour by You Me at Six
- Promotional poster for the tour
- Location: Europe; North America; Oceania
- Start date: 9 October 2024
- End date: 4 April 2025
- Legs: 3
- No. of shows: 81
- Supporting acts: Boston Manor; Champ Kind; Daytime TV; Dead Pony; Enter Shikari (Note: Billed as a co-headliner for North American dates.); Fastlane; Heights; Hevenshe; Holding Absence; Kid Kapichi; Mallory Knox; Mouth Culture; NOISY; Not Advised; Snake Eyes; The Blackout; The Skints; The Xcerts; Yours Truly

You Me at Six concert chronology
- Celebrating 10 Years of Cavalier Youth (2022); The Final Nights of Six (2024–25)

The Final Nights of Six was the final concert tour by English rock band You Me at Six, billed as the 20th anniversary of the band. The tour began on 9 October 2024 in Dallas, Texas, and concluded on 4 April 2025 in London, England.

== Background and announcement ==
In early 2024, the band announced their decision to disband after two decades together. Frontman Josh Franceschi explained that reaching the 20-year milestone felt like the appropriate time to conclude their journey, stating, "We feel like on the eve of our 20th anniversary as a band, now is a good time to call time."

In May 2024, the band unveiled the UK and Ireland leg of their farewell tour, set to begin on 15 February, 2025, in Brighton and concluding with a final show at the OVO Arena Wembley in London on 4 April, 2025. Franceschi expressed the band's desire to celebrate with as many fans as possible, noting, "We’ve put in the work for two decades and I want this band to be remembered for being one of the good ones that came in, did their fucking thing, and fucked off before they got kicked out."

== Set list ==
The following set list was performed in London, England on the last show of the tour, it does not represent all dates of the tour.

1. "Room to Breathe"
2. "Loverboy"
3. "Stay with Me"
4. "Save It for the Bedroom"
5. "Take Off Your Colours"
6. "Give"
7. "Night People"
8. "Fresh Start Fever"
9. "Straight to My Head"
10. "Lived a Lie"
11. "No One Does It Better"
12. "SUCKAPUNCH"
13. "Jealous Minds Think Alike"
14. "The Swarm"
15. "No Future? Yeah Right"
16. "Mixed Emotions (I Didn’t Know How To Tell You What I Was Going Through)"
17. "Fireworks"
18. "I Miss You" (Blink-182 cover)
19. "Liquid Confidence"
20. "Take On the World"
21. "Beautiful Way"
  Encore
22. "Bite My Tongue"
23. "Reckless"
24. "Underdog"

== Tour dates ==
List of 2024 concerts, showing date, city, country, venue, and opening act(s).
Date	City	Country	Venue	Opening acts
9 October	Dallas	United States	South Side Music Hall	Enter Shikari (Note: Billed as a co-headliner.); Yours Truly
10 October	Austin	United States	Empire Garage	Enter Shikari; Yours Truly
12 October	Houston	United States	Warehouse Live	Enter Shikari; Yours Truly
14 October	Orlando	United States	Beacham Theatre	Enter Shikari; Yours Truly
16 October	Washington, D.C.	United States	Howard Theatre	Enter Shikari; Yours Truly
17 October	Philadelphia	United States	Union Transfer	Enter Shikari; Yours Truly
18 October	Boston	United States	Paradise Rock Club	Enter Shikari; Yours Truly
19 October	New York City	United States	Palladium Times Square	Enter Shikari; Yours Truly
21 October	Montreal	Canada	Théâtre Beanfield	Enter Shikari; Yours Truly
23 October	Toronto	Canada	Danforth Music Hall	Enter Shikari; Yours Truly
24 October	Chicago	United States	Metro Chicago	Enter Shikari; Yours Truly
25 October	Minneapolis	United States	First Avenue	Enter Shikari; Yours Truly
26 October	Davenport	United States	Capitol Theatre	Enter Shikari; Yours Truly
27 October	St. Louis	United States	Red Flag	Enter Shikari; Yours Truly
29 October	Englewood	United States	Gothic Theatre	Enter Shikari; Yours Truly
30 October	Salt Lake City	United States	The Grand @ The Complex	Enter Shikari; Yours Truly
1 November	Spokane	United States	Knitting Factory	Enter Shikari; Yours Truly
2 November	Vancouver	Canada	Commodore Ballroom	Enter Shikari; Yours Truly
3 November	Portland	United States	Wonder Ballroom	Enter Shikari; Yours Truly
4 November	Seattle	United States	The Showbox	Enter Shikari; Yours Truly
6 November	Sacramento	United States	Ace of Spades	Enter Shikari; Yours Truly
7 November	San Francisco	United States	August Hall	Enter Shikari; Yours Truly
8 November	San Diego	United States	House of Blues	Enter Shikari; Yours Truly
9 November	Los Angeles	United States	Belasco Theater	Enter Shikari; Yours Truly
15 November	Paris	France	Le Bataclan	The Xcerts; Mouth Culture
17 November	Hamburg	Germany	Docks	The Xcerts; Mouth Culture
18 November	Copenhagen	Denmark	Pumpehuset	The Xcerts; Mouth Culture
19 November	Berlin	Germany	Astra Kulturhaus	The Xcerts; Mouth Culture
20 November	Warsaw	Poland	Palladium	The Xcerts; Mouth Culture
22 November	Prague	Czechia	ARCHA+	The Xcerts; Mouth Culture
23 November	Hanover	Germany	Kulturzentrum Faust	The Xcerts; Mouth Culture
24 November	Frankfurt	Germany	Batschkapp	The Xcerts; Mouth Culture
26 November	Vienna	Austria	SIMM City	The Xcerts; Mouth Culture
27 November	Milan	Italy	Magazzini Generali	The Xcerts; Mouth Culture
28 November	Zurich	Switzerland	X-TRA	The Xcerts; Mouth Culture
30 November	Cologne	Germany	Carlswerk Victoria	The Xcerts; Mouth Culture
1 December	Stuttgart	Germany	LKA Longhorn	The Xcerts; Mouth Culture
2 December	Eindhoven	Netherlands	Effenaar Grote Zaal	The Xcerts; Mouth Culture
4 December	Amsterdam	Netherlands	Melkweg	The Xcerts; Mouth Culture
5 December	Saint-Josse-ten-Noode	Belgium	Le Botanique	The Xcerts; Mouth Culture
6 December	Ghent	Belgium	Wintercircus	The Xcerts; Mouth Culture

List of 2025 concerts, showing date, city, country, venue, and opening act(s).
Date	City	Country	Venue	Opening acts
24 January	Brisbane	Australia	The Tivoli	Holding Absence; Hevenshe
26 January	Sydney	Australia	Enmore Theatre	Holding Absence; Hevenshe
27 January	Melbourne	Australia	Forum Theatre	Holding Absence; Hevenshe
29 January	Adelaide	Australia	Governor Hindmarsh Hotel	Holding Absence; Hevenshe
31 January	Perth	Australia	Astor Theatre	Holding Absence; Hevenshe
15 February	Brighton	England	Brighton Dome	Heights; NOISY
16 February	Portsmouth	England	Portsmouth Guildhall	Boston Manor; NOISY
17 February	Plymouth	England	Plymouth Pavilions	NOISY; Snake Eyes
19 February	Bristol	England	Bristol Beacon	NOISY; Snake Eyes
21 February	Edinburgh	Scotland	O_{2} Academy	The Xcerts; Dead Pony
22 February	Manchester	England	O_{2} Apollo	The Xcerts; Heights
23 February	Leeds	England	O_{2} Academy	The Xcerts; Champ Kind
25 February	Norwich	England	UEA	The Xcerts
26 February	Norwich	England	UEA	Champ Kind
27 February	Leicester	England	O_{2} Academy	The Skints
1 March	Nottingham	England	Rock City	Mallory Knox; Daytime TV
2 March	Liverpool	England	Eventim Apollo	Mallory Knox; Daytime TV
3 March	Sheffield	England	Octagon Centre	Mallory Knox; Daytime TV
4 March	Newcastle upon Tyne	England	NX	Mallory Knox; Daytime TV
6 March	Dublin	Ireland	3Olympia	The Xcerts
7 March	Dublin	Ireland	3Olympia	The Xcerts
8 March	Belfast	Northern Ireland	Telegraph Building	The Xcerts
10 March	Exeter	England	Great Hall	NOISY
11 March	Cardiff	Wales	Students' Union Great Hall	NOISY
13 March	Cardiff	Wales	Students' Union Great Hall	Dead Pony; The Blackout
14 March	Cardiff	Wales	Students' Union Great Hall	Kid Kapichi
15 March	Southampton	England	O_{2} Guildhall	Kid Kapichi; Not Advised
17 March	Nottingham	England	Rock City	Kid Kapichi
18 March	Nottingham	England	Rock City	Kid Kapichi; Fastlane
20 March	Newcastle upon Tyne	England	NX	Kid Kapichi
21 March	Glasgow	Scotland	Barrowland Ballroom	Kid Kapichi; Dead Pony
22 March	Glasgow	Scotland	Barrowland Ballroom	The Xcerts
23 March	Glasgow	Scotland	Barrowland Ballroom	The Xcerts; Keep Quiet
25 March	Leeds	England	O_{2} Academy	Kid Kapichi
26 March	Leeds	England	O_{2} Academy	Kid Kapichi
28 March	Manchester	England	O_{2} Apollo	Mouth Culture
29 March	Manchester	England	O_{2} Apollo	Kid Kapichi
30 March	Birmingham	England	O_{2} Academy	Mouth Culture
31 March	Birmingham	England	O_{2} Academy	Kid Kapichi
2 April	London	England	O_{2} Academy Brixton	The Blackout; Kid Kapichi
3 April	London	England	OVO Arena Wembley	Holding Absence; Boston Manor
4 April	London	England	OVO Arena Wembley	The Xcerts; Kid Kapichi
