= Dan Austin =

English record producer

Dan Austin is a sound engineer and music producer and mixer working in the United Kingdom. Austin also performs as a bassist.

== Early life ==
Austin attended The George Ward School and Lowbourne Junior School in Wiltshire. While in school he formed a band called Four Parts Water, towards the end of his time studying at The George Ward School he began working part-time at Moles Studio in Bath, Somerset.

== Career ==
In 2004, Austin played bass with the band the Cooper Temple Clause. He also produced a number of recordings with the group. He produced the band Cherry Ghost album, A Thirst For Romance and the follow-up albums Beneath this Burning Shoreline and Herd Runners. In 2008 a song he produced for this band won the Ivor Novello award.

Austin has contributed to the Doves' Kingdom Of Rust and new tracks on the Best Of release which he produced. Austin has also produced an album for US act Evaline, and he has also mixed tracks for Morning Parade and Young Rebel Set.

In 2010 Austin was producing and recording at the Moles Studio in Bath. He produced the debut album for Airship, as well as two EPs for this group.

Austin was shortlisted for a Music Producers Guild Award in 2013.

Since 2013 Austin has worked with Gil Norton on albums by Twin Atlantic, Futures, Pulled Apart By Horses and Maxïmo Park as well as tracks by The People the Poet and You Me At Six. Austin and Gil finished the debut album '‘Anthems’' for Pure Love, the new band from ex-Gallows frontman Frank Carter and in 2014 Austin produced an album with the band Arcane Roots.

== Production, mixing and engineering credits ==
- The Luka State (Producer, Mixer) More Than This Album
- Del Amitri (Producer, Engineer & Mixer) Fatal Mistakes Album
- You Me At Six (Producer, Engineer & Mixer) Suckapunch Album
- Doves (Producer, Engineer & Mixer) The Universal Want Album
- You Me At Six (Engineer & Producer) VI Album
- Twin Atlantic (Producer, Engineer & Mixerr) Power
- Guide Dog (Mixer) Lovely Domestic Bliss Album
- LOA State (Mixer) Forthcoming Album
- Soundhorn (Mixer) Extended Mixes for Shadowlark
- Lisbon (Mixer) Forthcoming tracks
- Everyone You Know (Mixer) Forthcoming EP
- She Makes War (Producer & Mixer) Brace for Impact Album
- Fine Creatures (Producer, Engineer & Mixer) Electric La La Land EP
- The Ninth Wave (Producer & Engineer) Never Crave Attention Album
- Pretty Vicious (Producer & Mixer) Beauty of Youth
- Shadowlark (Mixer) Forthcoming tracks
- SheMakesWar (Engineer & Mixer) Forthcoming tracks
- The Ninth Wave (Producer & Mixer) Forthcoming EP
- MOSES (Producer & Mixer) Forthcoming track “Kingsize”
- Shadowlark (Producer & Mixer) Forthcoming tracks
- SoShe (Co-producer & Mixer) Forthcoming EP
- Love Amongst Ruin (Producer) Forthcoming track
- Guidedog (Producer & Mixer) Forthcoming album
- Sløtface (Producer, Engineer & Mixer) Try Not to Freak Out
- SoShe Feat. Cadet (Additional Producer & Mixer) "Showed Up" track
- Mallory Knox (Producer & Mixer) Wired Album
- Young Legionnaire (Mixer) Zero Worship Album
- Lisbon (Producer & Mixer) "Vice", "Shark" + forthcoming track
- Gallery Circus (Producer & Mixer) "Holland on Fire" * "Club House Killer" tracks
- Sløtface (Producer, Engineer & Mixer) "Sponge State" and "Empire Records" EPs
- Love Amongst Ruin (Producer & Mixer) Lose Your Way Album
- Monarks (Producer & Mixer) "You Were My Fire", "Amorous" tracks + forthcoming EP
- Daisy Victoria (Producer & Mixer) Animal Lover EP
- Losers (Mixer) How To Ruin Other People’s Futures Album
- Leaders of Men (Engineer) Forthcoming tracks
- She Makes War (Mixer) Disarm: 15 EP
- Army of Bones (Engineer) Army of Bones Album
- Benji Wild (Engineer & Mixer) Watch and Learn track and forthcoming tracks
- HEN (Mixer) Forthcoming album
- Pleasure Beach (Mixer) Dreamer to the Dawn EP
- Club Kuru (Producer, Engineer & Mixer) Layla EP & forthcoming tracks
- Monarks (Mixer) The End EP
- Britain (Producer & Engineer) Forthcoming tracks
- JAWS (Engineer) Simplicity Album
- The Enemy (Mixer) It’s Automatic album
- Ollie Smith (Producer) Forthcoming tracks
- Jimi Goodwin (Producer) Forthcoming album
- Young Guns (Engineer) Ones and Zeros Album
- Club Kuru (Producer, Engineer & Mixer) All the Days EP
- Kid Wave (Producer, Engineer & Mixer) Wonderlust album
- Bad Breeding (Producer & Mixer) "Chains" and other tracks
- Pixies (Engineer & Mixer) Indie Cindy Album
- Cherry Ghost (Mixer) Herd Runners Album
- Club Kuru (Producer & Mixer) “All the Days” and “Seesaw” tracks
- Arcane Roots (Producer & Mixer) “Over and Over” track
- Mallory Knox (Engineer & Mixer) Asymmetry Album
- Jimi Goodwin (Producer, Engineer & Mixer) Odludek Album
- Sonny's Burning (Writer, Producer & Mixer) Forthcoming album
- I AM IN LOVE (Mixer) “Proposal” and “Mirrors & Smoke” tracks
- Twin Atlantic (Engineer) Great Divide Album
- AFI (Engineer) Burials Album
- Six. By Seven (Producer & Mixer) Love and Peace and Sympathy Album
- Pixies (Engineer & Mixer)EP1, EP2, & EP3 EPs
- Arcane Roots (Producer) Blood & Chemistry Album
- Pure Love (Engineer & Mixer) Anthems Album
- Surfer Blood (Engineer) Pythons Album
- You Me At Six (Engineer & Mixer) “The Swarm” track
- Maximo Park (Engineer & Mixer) The National Health Album
- Pulled Apart by Horses (Engineer & Mixer) “Sing” & “Molly Drove Me Away” tracks
- Futures (Engineer & Mixer) The Karma Album
- Twin Atlantic (Engineer & Mixer) Free Album
- Airship (Producer & Mixer) Stuck In This Ocean Album
- Young Rebel Set (Producer & Mixer) Curse Our Love Album track
- Bayside (Engineer) Killing Time Album
- The Winchell Riots (Producer & Mixer) Figure 8’s EP
- Doves (Mixer) The Places Between: The Best of Doves Album
- Doves (co-producer) “Andalucia” and tracks from The Places Between: The Best of Doves Album
- Cherry Ghost (Producer & Mixer) Beneath This Burning Shoreline Album
- Morning Parade (Producer & Mixer) “Marble Attic,” “Youth,” & “Seaside” Tracks
- Evaline (Producer & Mixer) Woven Material Album
- Massive Attack (Programmer) Heligoland Album
- Doves (Co-Producer & Mixer) Kingdom of Rust Album
- Doves (Engineer) Some Cities Album
- The Hours (Engineer) See the Light Album
- People in Planes (Producer) Beyond the Horizon Album
- Starsailor (Engineer) Boy In Waiting EP
- Cherry Ghost (Producer, Engineer, & Mixer) Thirst For Romance Album
- B52s (Engineer) Funplex Album
- ILikeTrains (Producer & Engineer) “Terra Nova” Track
- Massive Attack (Engineer & Programmer) Battle In Seattle OST Album Tracks
- Cooper Temple Clause (Producer) Make This Your Own Album Tracks
- Massive Attack (Producer & Mixer) Collected Album track
- People In Planes (Producer & Mixer) “Instantly Gratified” track and As Far As The Eye Can See Album tracks
- Massive Attack (Programmer) Various Adverts
- Fell City Girl (Producer & Mixer) Swim EP
- Queens of the Stone Age (Producer & Mixer) Over The Years & Through The Woods Live DVD
- Oceansize (Producer & Engineer) Everyone Into Position Album
- KT Tunstall (Engineer) “Under the Weather” track
- Cooper Temple Claus (Producer & Mixer) Kick Up The Fire And Let The Flames Break Loose Album
- Motion Picture Soundtrack (Producer & Mixer) “When All The Lights Go Out” tracks
- Biffy Clyro (Engineer & Programmer) A Blackened Sky Album
- Snuff (Engineer & Programmer) Disposable Income Album
- Cooper Temple Clause (Engineer & Programmer) See This Through and Leave Album
- Reef (Engineer) “Steal Away” Single
- Placebo (Engineer & Programmer) Live in Paris DVD
- My Vitriol (Live Engineer) Live Tracks
- Mansun (Assistant Engineer) “I Can Only Disappoint You” Track
- Robert Plant (Assistant Engineer) Dream Land Album
- Elevator Suite (Assistant Engineer) Barefoot & Shitfaced Album
- Medium 21 (Assistant Engineer) Killings from the Dial Album
