= Suckapunch (album) =

Studio album by You Me at Six
- Released: 15 January 2021
- Recorded: November 2018, October–November 2019
- Studio: VADA, Alcester; Bluebell Hill, Kent; Karma Sound, Bang Saray, Thailand
- Genre: Rock
- Length: 43:04
- Label: Underdog; AWAL
- Producer: Dan Austin

You Me at Six chronology
VI (2018)	Suckapunch (2021)	Truth Decay (2023)

Singles from Suckapunch
- 1. "What's It Like" Released: 16 August 2019; 2. "Make Me Feel Alive" Released: 21 August 2020; 3. "Beautiful Way" Released: 22 September 2020; 4. "Suckapunch" Released: 26 November 2020; 5. "Adrenaline" Released: 4 January 2021

Suckapunch is the seventh studio album by English rock band You Me at Six. It was released on 15 January 2021, through the band's own label Underdog Records and AWAL. Within a month of releasing their sixth studio album VI, they had recorded "What's It Like" at VADA Studios in Alcester in November 2018. The touring circle for that album continued into mid-2019, when they started recording a new album with Dan Austin in October and November 2019 at Karma Sound Studios in Bang Saray, Thailand. Suckapunch is a rock album with electronic, hip hop and R&B influences.

Suckapunch received generally favourable reviews from music critics, many of whom complimented the songwriting and the album's aggressive tone. The album topped the album charts in both Scotland and the United Kingdom, in addition to charting in Germany. "What's It Like" was released as a single in August 2019; promotion for the album did not start until "Make Me Feel Alive" was released as a single in August 2020. "Suckapunch" and "Adrenaline" followed as singles in November 2020 and January 2021, respectively. Between May and July 2021, the band went toured the UK twice; they went on a short tour in September 2021, prior to a supporting slot for Bring Me the Horizon on their arena tour. Kerrang! included the album on their list for the 50 best releases of the year.

== Background ==
You Me at Six released their sixth studio album VI in October 2018, reaching number six on the UK Albums Chart. Initial promotion consisted of a two-month tour of the United Kingdom in November and December 2018. While the tour was intended to promote VI, the band used the stint to celebrate the 10th anniversary of their debut studio album Take Off Your Colours (2008). You Me at Six rehearsed for the tour at VADA Studios in Alcester in November 2018, where they had recorded VI; as the band had new song ideas, they ended up recording them, one of which was "What's It Like". By July 2019, the band were in the planning stages for their next album.

On 16 August 2019, "What's It Like" was released as a single; around this time, the band appeared at the Reading and Leeds Festivals. The following month, the band concluded the touring cycle for VI with a headlining slot at Gunnersville festival. In the months leading up to it, three of the band members went through break-ups. Following the show, the members were in discussion about moving out of London, and going travelling. They wanted to return to the studio as soon as possible, with their management being hesitant about this as they felt the band did not have enough material for an album at this point. The band did pre-production at drummer Dan Flint's home studio, dubbed The Boneyard.

== Recording ==
You Me at Six had planned to use VADA for the main album sessions, but when working out the budget, it was proposed working in Thailand. The band's guitarist, Max Helyer, said it was a friend that suggested the country, while Barnes said it was his idea, with the latter saying their other options were either in Wales or Belgium. In October and November 2019, the band went to Bang Saray, Thailand to recorded at Karma Sound Studios with producer Dan Austin. Austin previously produced VI; as the band became more comfortable with him, he helped to push their boundaries. Before arriving, the band had written five complete songs, and had ideas for 20 more; they eventually recorded there for five weeks total. Bang Saray is a fishing village on the country's Eastern side, close to the city Pattaya. Flint said the country was "a way for us to block out the noise, escape the outside world ... I'm not saying we went to Thailand to find ourselves, but being locked in this blissful bubble gave us clarity."

"Kill the Mood" was partially recorded in Los Angeles, California over a two-hour session and Bluebell Hill Studio in Kent, before being finished in Thailand. With the members having flown to Thailand, they could only take a limited amount of equipment with them. Bassist Matt Barnes took two Marshall amplifiers, the JCM800 model for distorted parts and the JTM45 model for clean parts. He used the Peavey 5150 and 6505 models of amplifier heads that the studio had. Helyer took his pedalboard and an Audio Kitchen Little Chopper amplifier head with him and found that the studio had a Fender Twin amplifier, which he found to have a similar sound to his own equipment. He mainly used that, but would occasionally use a Kemper amplifier to achieve a "little bit more of a clearer sound".

== Composition and lyrics ==
Musically, Suckapunch has been described as rock, incorporating electronic flourishes. Vocalist Josh Franceschi said VI "felt like we were sparring with the idea of the next step for the band", while Suckapunch "feels like we're there". He explained that the band was more comfortable utilizing elements of hip hop and R&B into their sound, without it coming across as contrived. The band wrote the majority of the tracks alone, but employed additional writers on a few tracks: Nick Hodgson on "Beautiful Way"; Julian Emery and Jim Irvin on "Suckapunch"; Mark Jackson and Ian Scott on "Kill the Mood"; and Corey Sanders and Jon Maguire on "Adrenaline". Sanders had been a long-term fan of the band, having met them a decade prior and told them he would eventually write a song with them. Some of the songs originated while the band was touring their fifth studio album Night People (2017), which were intentionally left off VI. Discussing the album's title, said Franceschi: "We're coming back here, no fear, we're just gonna go for it [...] You Me at Six making music with zero fear with the handbrake off".

The opening track, "Nice to Me", is an industrial rock and garage rock song that sets the tone for the rest of the album, complete with glitchy percussion and synthesizer work. The song was one of the last songs done during the demoing phase prior to visiting Thailand; the demo was made at Helyer's home studio and consisted of ideas for an intro, verse and chorus sections. Despite its incomplete state, Franceschi said it felt like an opener to an album. The title phrase originates from one of the staff members at Karma Sound, when answering a question would say "only if you're nice to me". Franceschi came up with a number of the lyrics when he was swimming in a pool; when they were recording guitars for it, Franceschi spent 15–20 minutes working on the rest of the words, after having watched The People v. O. J. Simpson: American Crime Story (2016). "Make Me Feel Alive", which was almost titled "A/S/L", talks about having control, losing it, and then eventually reclaiming it. It dates back to June–July 2019 when Franceschi was at Flint's residence and the latter showed the former an early version of the track that he worked on with Helyer. The guitars and drums were recorded with varispeed, which can make instruments sound like they have been sampled. It is the band's heaviest song since "Bite My Tongue" on their third studio album Sinners Never Sleep (2011), and is driven by Flint's breakbeats.

"Beautiful Way" is about the relationship one has with themselves, getting older, and accepting flaws. Franceschi and Helyer spent two days writing the song; when Helyer started playing an arpeggio, Franceschi thought it sounded like "Mr. Brightside" (2003) by the Killers and encouraged him to continue working on it. They initially came up with a chorus section in half-time, but Franceschi felt that it hampered the song. He said the chorus should match the intensity of the lyrics, to which Helyer said he had been listening to drum and bass. Barnes and Helyer had gotten into that style of music, and felt it would give the song more energy. "WYDRN", short for What You Doing Right Now, was written in Toronto, Canada, and sees the band make R&B-indebted rock. The song's creation was a result of Flint and Franceschi talking about music, going into their separate rooms to work on ideas and merged them together. Franceschi said they wanted to do their own take on emo rap without appearing as if they were following a trend.

"Suckapunch" sees the band move into dance-rock and electro territory, and is about finding one's self. It evolved out of a 90-second voicenote that had Franceschi mumbling and Helyer playing piano. Guitarist Chris Miller said it reminded him of music from The Matrix (1999) and the work of Rage Against the Machine. Franceschi had song's riff for a few years and would occasionally play it to the band acoustically. The riff was then played electronically akin to 1990s dance from Ibiza. "Kill the Mood" was written in Los Angeles, California; the band wanted it to be a "Kendrick Lamar [track] with guitars". Helyer had come up with the chord progression while in Birmingham when promoting Night People. When in Los Angeles, Franceschi remembered the chord progression and suggested they incorporate it into the song. Alongside this, Helyer used other guitar parts, such as a "sludgy down progression" recalling the "swaggy rock and roll" of Oasis, merging it with a West Coast hip hop sound.

The ballad "Glasgow" discusses the loss of a loved one and coming to terms with it. Describing the lyrics, Franceschi said: "[Y]ou can either grow to resent that person, or grow to accept and respect how they feel and move on". Franceschi came up with rough ideas for the melody while in his basement, and later showed it to the rest of the band during a rehearsal. They expanded on it and finished it after three further jam sessions; Flint said the city of the same name was one of their favourite locations to perform. "Adrenaline" talks about having split personalities, and relying on co-dependency, which was something Franceschi realised he struggled with. It was written in a studio north of Alexandra Palace in London around the November–December 2018 UK tour, while the middle eight was later done in Thailand. According to Helyer, "Voicenotes" was influenced by Igor's Theme" (2019) by Tyler, the Creator. Barnes said the guitars in it acts in a call-and-response manner and panned differently. The guitar part that Helyer had demoed was a single-note riff that featured throughout the track. When they tried recording it, he thought it "sounds a bit crap"; Barnes then thought that the riff should be played on a bass and the guitars should be enhanced by a DigiTech Whammy pedal.

Franceschi wrote the penultimate song "Finish What I Started" about an instance where he nearly took his own life; it was written while touring Night People in Germany in 2017. The band worked on the song further when they were recording VI. The closing track, "What's It Like", is an electronic rock song with influence from hip hop, recalling Amo (2019)-era Bring Me the Horizon. Discussing the song, Franceschi said he "sort of poke[s] fun at those who are libertines or self-serving [...] Life's not a competition, but people have a tendency to play it out that way". The idea for the song originated from Flint while he was in a session with Barnes and Miller.

== Release ==
"Our House (The Mess We Made)" was released as a non-album single in February 2020, with funds going to an Australian bushfire relief. "Make Me Feel Alive" was released as a single on 21 August 2020; the song's music video is done in a split screen point-of-view style, and features a cameo from Leigh Gill. A lyric video was released for it on 8 September, with footage of Flint skydiving. On 21 September, Suckapunch was announced for release early next year. Alongside this, the album's track listing and artwork were revealed, and "Beautiful Way" was released as a single. A remixed version of "Make Me Feel Alive", done by Flint; according to Rock Sound, it took the "heated aggression of the original track and add[ed] some guttural breakbeats, pumping bass and industrial atmosphere, it completely changes the tone of the track from devastating to euphoric". "Suckapunch" was released as a single on 26 November 2020; the song's music video was directed by Cass Virdee. "Adrenaline" was released as a single on 4 January 2021. Five days later, the band released a making-of documentary on the recording of the album. Suckapunch was released on 15 January 2021, through the band's own label Underdog Records and AWAL. The Japanese edition included a live version of "What's It Like" recorded at Gunnersville Festival.

An orchestral version of "Glasgow" was released in February 2021. On 6 May 2021, a music video was released for "WYDRN", consisting of footage from their fans. In May and July 2021, the band embarked on a UK tour, bookending an appearance at the Isle of Wight Festival in June. Coinciding with this, a deluxe version of the album was released on 2 July 2021, featuring new songs "Read My Mind", "Headshot" and "Serotonin Szn", alongside alternate versions of "Beautiful Way" and "Voicenotes", and the orchestral version of "Glasgow". Discussing the decision to reissue the album, Franceschi explained that "amidst the ongoing pandemic we found ourselves in an interesting place, we can’t tour, but don’t feel ready to start a new project. We remembered there were a bunch of songs we’d made in Thailand that were kind of half completed". "Ready My Mine" was posted online three days ahead of the re-release. Following an appearance at the Reading and Leeds Festivals, the band went on a short UK tour in September 2021, with support from Saint Phnx and Noisy, leading into a supporting slot on Bring Me the Horizon's arena tour.

== Reception ==
Professional ratings
Aggregate scores
Source	Rating
AnyDecentMusic?	7.5/10
Metacritic	79/100
Review scores
Source	Rating
Clash	7/10
DIY	3.5/5 stars
Dork	4/5 stars
Gigwise	8/10 stars
Kerrang!	4/5
NME	4/5 stars

Suckapunch was met with generally favourable reviews from music critics. At Metacritic, the album received an average score of 79, based on 5 reviews. AnyDecentMusic? gave it an average score of 7.5, based on seven reviews.

Gigwise writer Harrison Smith said the band were "manoeuvering amongst the timely lyrical themes of damaging relationships, heartbreak and prominent middle fingers to all those who have doubted the band previously." Ali Shuter of NME noted that few of the lyrics could be "read like they were written by an angsty teen wearing a 'normal people scare me' badge, but the raw passion of Franceschi's soaring delivery ... feel empowering." He added that it was "rare for a rock record to feel this exciting," with every song on the album coming across as "inspired in some way." Kerrang!'s Jake Richardson praised the band's experimentation with different genres, though it was not "flawless", citing the closing track as a misstep. He added the at album was a "win for You Me At Six. It jabs with style, and demonstrates that, far from running out of ideas, this band remain intent on staying at the cutting edge of modern British rock."

Dork writer Stephen Ackroyd said the band were "sharpening up their edges ... You Me At Six are back at full volume." Lucy Toole at Hot Press found it to be the band's "most expansive, genre-defying sound to date", with the "raw passion at the centre of their approach, as they face up to the reality of adulthood in their songwriting." Suh Fell of Clash wrote that the band "have managed to craft a hard hitting and forward thinking record that fuses more traditionalist elements of rock with sounds from genres currently dominating cultural conversation." DIY reviewer Sarah Jamieson said the album "arrives with a more aggressive edge" than their past albums, "throw[ing] caution to the wind". She referred to it as a "melting pot of the band's real-life influences ... this is a version of You Me At Six we've never seen before, and it's certainly bold."

Suckapunch topped the chart in Scotland and the UK, and reached number 54 in Germany. Kerrang! ranked the album at number 46 on their list of the year's 50 best releases.

== Track listing ==
Writing credits per booklet.

Suckapunch track listing
No.	Title	Writer(s)	Length
1.	"Nice to Me"	You Me at Six	4:27
2.	"Make Me Feel Alive"	You Me at Six	2:08
3.	"Beautiful Way"	You Me at Six; Nick Hodgson (add.)	3:45
4.	"WYDRN"	You Me at Six	3:29
5.	"Suckapunch"	You Me at Six; Julian Emery (add.); Jim Irvin (add.)	4:59
6.	"Kill the Mood"	You Me at Six; Mark Jackson (add.); Ian Scott (add.)	3:08
7.	"Glasgow"	You Me at Six	5:39
8.	"Adrenaline"	You Me at Six; Corey Sanders (add.); Jon Maguire (add.)	3:30
9.	"Voicenotes"	You Me at Six	4:01
10.	"Finish What I Started"	You Me at Six	4:28
11.	"What's It Like"	You Me at Six	3:27
Total length:			43:04

Japanese edition bonus track
No.	Title	Length
12.	"What's It Like" (Gunnersville Festival 2019)	4:47
Total length:		47:58

== Personnel ==
Personnel per booklet.

You Me at Six

- Josh Franceschi – lead vocals
- Max Helyer – rhythm guitar
- Chris Miller – lead guitar
- Matt Barnes – bass guitar
- Dan Flint – drums

Production and design

- Dan Austin – producer
- Henry Watkins – engineer
- Giles Smith – album artwork photo
- Mark James – album design

== Charts ==
Chart performance for Suckapunch
Chart (2021)	Peak position
German Albums (Offizielle Top 100)	54
Scottish Albums (OCC)	1
UK Albums (OCC)	1
UK Rock & Metal Albums (OCC)	1
