= Truth Decay (You Me at Six album) =

Studio album by You Me at Six
- Released: 10 February 2023
- Studio: Black Rock (Santorini); Otterhead (Rugby); The Boneyard
- Length: 45:37
- Label: AWAL; Rise; Underdog
- Producer: Dan Austin

You Me at Six chronology
Suckapunch (2021)	Truth Decay (2023)	Live from Alexandra Place - EP (2023)

Singles from Truth Decay
- 1. "Deep Cuts" Released: 22 July 2022; 2. "No Future? Yeah Right" Released: 13 September 2022; 3. "Mixed Emotions (I Didn't Know How To Tell You What I Was Going Through)" Released: 21 October 2022; 4. "Heartless" Released: 8 December 2022; 5. "Mydopamine" Released: 14 January 2023

Professional ratings
Aggregate scores
Source	Rating
Metacritic	81/100
Review scores
Source	Rating
Clash	7/10
DIY	4.5/5 stars
God Is in the TV	7/10
Kerrang!	4/5 stars
The Line of Best Fit	7/10
Upset	4/5 stars

Truth Decay is the eighth and final studio album by English rock band You Me at Six. It was released on 10 February 2023, through the band's own recording label Underdog Records and AWAL in association with Rise Records.

== Background ==
On 22 July 2022, You Me at Six announced the release of their eighth studio album, along with the first single "Deep Cuts". You Me at Six frontman Josh Franceschi said of the single: "Deep Cuts is about being on the outside looking in on people in your circle who are going through pain or a bad moment by being with the wrong person. Suffering because they're holding onto someone or something that they could let go of."

On 5 September 2022, it was announced You Me at Six would be releasing their second single "No Future? Yeah Right" with Enter Shikari's vocalist Rou Reynolds. The single was released a week later on 13 September 2022. The third single "Mixed Emotions (I Didn't Know How To Tell You What I Was Going Through)" was released on 21 October 2022.

You Me at Six released their fourth single "Heartless" on 8 December 2022. Of the single, Franceschi said: "It's a song about feeling insecure and yet accepting of whatever may come. I wrote this song about someone close to me in the middle ground of a break up and falling in love."

On 14 January 2023, the band announced they were moving the release date of the album from 27 January 2023 to 10 February 2023 due to vinyl production issues; they also released their fifth single "My Dopamine".

== Critical reception ==
Truth Decay was met with "universal acclaim" reviews from critics. At Metacritic, which assigns a weighted average rating out of 100 to reviews from mainstream publications, this release received an average score of 81, based on 5 reviews.

Writing for DIY, Sarah Jamieson wrote: "the band find themselves taking the more experimental turns of its predecessor, and melding them with the brand of emo-rock that they honed so well across their early career."

Truth Decay reached number 4 in the UK, number 2 in Scotland, and number 1 on the UK Rock Chart.

== Track listing ==
All tracks are written by You Me at Six (Matthew Barnes, Daniel Flint, Josh Franceschi, Max Helyer, and Christopher Miller). Additional writers are noted below.

Truth Decay track listing
No.	Title	Writer(s)	Length
1.	"Deep Cuts"		4:13
2.	"Mixed Emotions (I Didn't Know How to Tell You What I Was Going Through)"		4:09
3.	"God Bless the 90s Kids"		3:23
4.	"After Love in the After Hours"	Barnes; Flint; Franceschi; Helyer; Miller; Nick Bradley; Ellis Lawrie	3:59
5.	"No Future? Yeah Right" (featuring Rou Reynolds)	Barnes; Flint; Franceschi; Helyer; Miller; Rou Reynolds	3:16
6.	"Heartless"		3:27
7.	"Who Needs Revenge When I've Got Ellen Rae"		2:53
8.	"Breakdown"	Barnes; Flint; Franceschi; Helyer; Miller; Ed Thomas	3:09
9.	"Traumatic Iconic"		2:46
10.	"Mydopamine"		3:33
11.	"A Smile to Make You Weak(er) at the Knees"		2:46
12.	"Ultraviolence"		3:46
13.	"A Love Letter to Those Who Feel Lost" (featuring Cody Frost)	Barnes; Flint; Franceschi; Helyer; Miller; Carey Willetts	4:10

== Personnel ==
You Me at Six

- Matt Barnes – bass guitar
- Dan Flint – drums
- Josh Franceschi – vocals
- Max Helyer – guitar
- Chris Miller – guitar

Additional contributors

- Dan Austin – production (all tracks), mixing (tracks 6, 8, 12, 13)
- Kolton Lee – mixing (1–5, 7, 9–11)
- John Davis – mastering
- Rou Reynolds – additional vocal production (5)
- Mike Lythgoe – creative direction
- Tonia Arapovic – creative production
- Freddie Stisted – photography
- Robbie – set design
- Mel Hamilton – styling

== Charts ==
Chart performance for Truth Decay
Chart (2023)	Peak position
Belgian Albums (Ultratop Wallonia)	163
Scottish Albums (OCC)	2
UK Albums (OCC)	4
UK Independent Albums (OCC)	1
UK Rock & Metal Albums (OCC)	1
