= Heathside School =

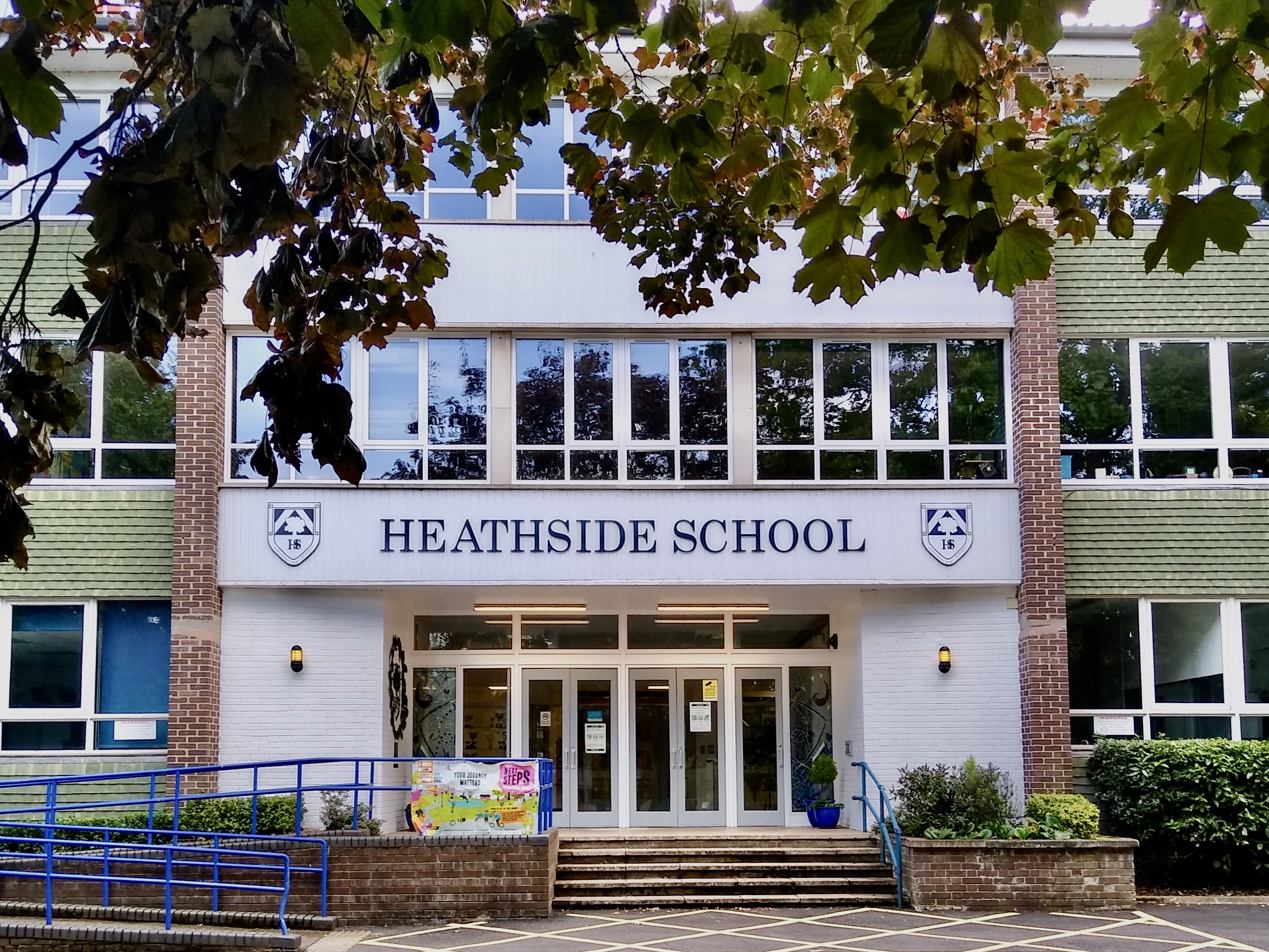

Location
- Brooklands Lane; Weybridge, Surrey, KT13 8UZ; England; 51.36466°N 0.46518°W

Information
- Type: Academy
- Motto: Endeavour, Respect and Trust
- Established: 1966 (Caretaker at opening Colin Johnson)
- School board: ElmWey Learning Trust
- Local authority: Surrey
- Department for Education URN: 142314 Tables
- Ofsted: Reports
- Executive headteacher: Anne Cullum
- Head of School: Gareth Lewis
- Gender: Coeducational
- Age: 11 to 18
- Enrolment: 1260
- Houses: CPSU, CCP, NSDP, WPK
- Colours: Navy blue and white
- Website: www.heathside.surrey.sch.uk

Heathside School is a co-educational secondary school for students aged 11–18 situated in Brooklands Lane, Weybridge, Surrey, England. The Executive Principal is Anne Cullum.

The school used to be a Foundation Community Technology College in affiliation with the Diocese of Guildford. The school is also affiliated with the Specialist Schools and Academies Trust.

The Good School Guide described the school as a "Winning combination of committed staff and eager students – state education as it should be". In its 2018 report Ofsted described the school as a Good School.

In September 2022 Heathside School will be opening a sister school, Heathside, Walton-on-Thames, to be built on greenbelt land. On 4 June 2020, Elmbridge Borough Council approved the plans with local MP Dominic Raab describing it as "an important step towards a great new local school".

== Academic ==
Over the past few years, Heathside has produced GCSE grades in the top 10% of the country. In summer 2019, 39% of GCSE grades were awarded a grade 9-7 with an overall pass rate of 99.9% and 39% of A-Levels were graded A - A* with 36 students achieving two or more A or A*.

== Sixth Form ==
The Sixth Form at Heathside consists of 202 pupils.

== Notable pupils ==
- Amanda Dowler – abducted
- Louis Cole — YouTuber
- Josh Franceschi — musician
