= VI (You Me at Six album) =

Studio album by You Me at Six
- Released: 5 October 2018
- Recorded: May 2018
- Studio: VADA, Alcester
- Genre: Pop; rock
- Length: 33:49
- Label: Underdog; AWAL
- Producer: Dan Austin; You Me at Six; Joel Pott; Eg White

You Me at Six chronology
Night People (2017)	VI (2018)	Suckapunch (2021)

Singles from VI
- 1. "3AM"/"Fast Forward" Released: 6 June 2018; 2. "I O U" Released: 10 August 2018; 3. "Back Again" Released: 21 August 2018

VI is the sixth studio album by English rock band You Me at Six, released on 5 October 2018 through Underdog Records and AWAL. Within months of releasing their fifth studio album Night People in early 2017, the members expressed a disliking for it and were already working on its follow-up by September 2017. They went on residential studio writing retreats in Reading, Berkshire and Bury St Edmunds, and subsequently met with various producers. Dan Austin was then enlisted, and the band recorded their next album at VADA Studios in Alcester in May 2018. VI is a pop and rock album that incorporates electronic influences, which guitarist Max Helyer attributed to the works of Jess Glynne, Two Door Cinema Club and the Weeknd.

VI received generally favourable reviews from music critics, many of whom complimented the change in You Me at Six's sound. The album peaked at number six in the United Kingdom and number eight in Scotland, as well as charting in Australia and the United States. "3AM" and "Fast Forward" were released as a double A-side lead single in June 2018, followed by "I O U" in August 2018. You Me at Six promoted the album with a headlining UK tour at the end of the year; they opened 2019 with a tour of mainland Europe. They then went on a US tour, and then an Australian tour supporting Bring Me the Horizon. Rock Sound ranked the album within the top 30 of their 50 best releases of the year list.

== Background ==
You Me at Six released their fifth album Night People in January 2017. Despite reaching number three in the UK, it received a mixed reception from both their fans and critics. Within a week of the album coming out, the band fired their management and found themselves stuck in private legal battles, where they would spend more time with their respective lawyers than being on tour. The band were initially ecstatic about the album at its release, however, by August 2017 they expressed disdain for it. On a number of occasions while making the album, the members felt complacent when trying to be creative and self-motivating. In addition, they were around people that didn't help stimulate their creativity.

In September 2017, guitarist Max Helyer and vocalist Josh Franceschi revealed they were working on new music at drummer Dan Flint's home studio. The members had conversations whether to revisit the sound of their most successful record Cavalier Youth (2014). Eventually, it reached a point where Franceschi and Flint were content with breaking up the band if they were unable to move forward musically. Sometime afterwards, they went on residential studio writing retreats to The Doghouse in Reading, Berkshire and Monkey Puzzle in Bury St Edmunds. The group then made demos piece-by-piece with loops. Whenever a member came up with an interesting idea, they attempted it before working on another idea. They did not move on to a new song until the current one they were working on was roughly 50–60% complete.

== Production ==
You Me at Six had discussions with various producers, who wanted to record in locations such as Los Angeles, New York City and the south of France. When the group made it clear that they wanted to record in the UK, a number of them were no longer interested. They made some test tracks with two different people before eventually settling on Dan Austin. The band had worked with Austin previously as he engineered the session that resulted in their non-album single "The Swarm" in 2012. Franceschi said they decided to test him with a demo of "I O U", where they wanted him to marry the "Red Hot Chilli Peppers rocky sort of groove" during the verse section with the "hip-hop, Dr Dre sounding" chorus section. Sessions took place at VADA Studios, a residential studio in Alcester, UK; a location chosen as it was far away from everyday distractions of the members' lives. The band co-produced the sessions with Austin. Austin, who shared similar music tastes with the members, understood the band's direction for the album.

While Night People was made akin to a 9–5 job, the band made VI working 14-hour days, pausing only to sleep. They didn't track on a song-by-song basis, opting to work on all of the songs at the same time. The band and Austin used the Weeknd's albums as reference points, especially the low-end sound and the textures on his vocals. If a member wasn't tracking their part, they were able to take a walk around the lakes close by or watch the local football matches. Flint used a lot of his spare time finding loops and particular instrument sounds on his laptop to help expand the songs. They used a number of Telefunken microphones, and mainly a U47 microphone for vocals. A C-12 microphone was used as an overhead for the drums.

Franceschi said Austin felt like a sixth member of band in the way he was hard working and highly enthusiastic about pushing the band. He also mentioned that other producers would have led the band down a musical route that they had already explored. The band and Austin produced all of the songs bar "Pray for Me" (which was produced by Pott) and "Losing You" (which was produced by White). White did additional production on "Fast Forward", while Pott did the same on "Back Again" and "3AM". During the mixing process, the band worked collectively to decide what worked best. Flint built a close friendship with mixing engineer Cenzo Townsend, who Flint would often relay the band's thoughts to. The recordings were then mastered by John Davis at Metropolis Studios. On 25 May 2018, the band announced they had finished working on VI.

== Composition ==
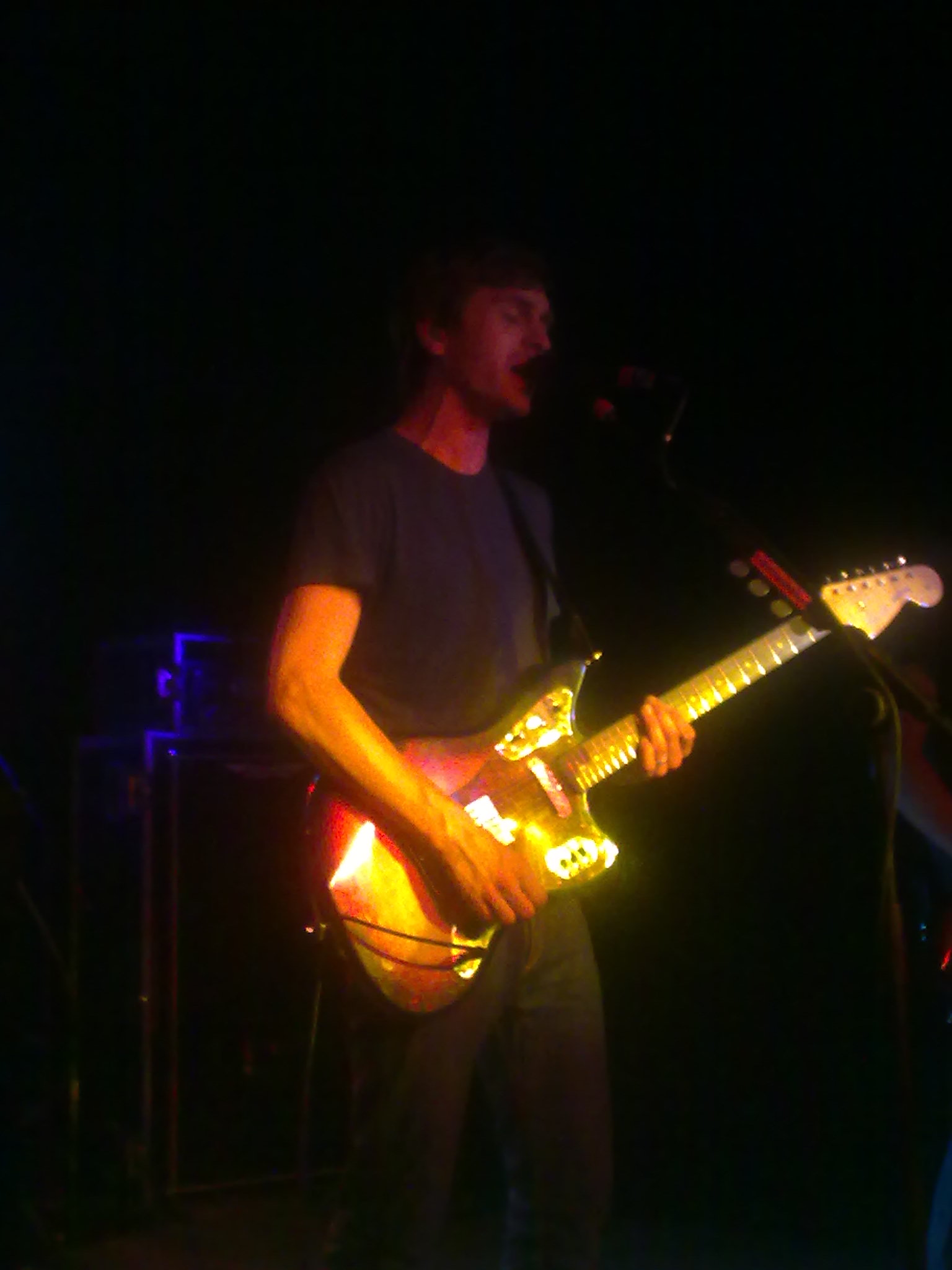
You Me at Six worked with Eg White and Joel Pott (pictured), the latter of whom did additional writing on "Back Again", "3AM" and "Pray for Me".

Discussing the album's name VI, Franceschi explained: "There's a feeling within us that we already have our identity, so we don't need to create new one." He said the record featured more hip hop and R&B elements, something that the band had difficulty incorporating successfully with their previous albums. While on their song writing retreats, the members collaborated with acclaimed songwriters Eg White and Joel Pott, and were encouraged to bring their individual influences into the songs.

All of songs on VI were written by the band, with lyrics by Franceschi. Additional writing was done to "Fast Forward" and "Losing You" by White, and to "Back Again", "3AM" and "Pray for Me" by Pott. Musically, VI has been classed as pop and rock, incorporating electronic influences. According to Helyer, the album was influenced by the Weeknd, Two Door Cinema Club and Jess Glynne. Franceschi said Helyer's love of Justin Timberlake and Pharrell Williams gave it a sense of positivity.

The opening track "Fast Forward" is an alternative rock song that opens with a synthesizer part, before switching to guitars and drums in the vein of Royal Blood. Franceschi claimed the song "really shaped" the album and said it was a self-assessment of his personal life during the Night People cycle. The stadium rock song "Straight to My Head" is followed by the disco-indebted "Back Again", which discusses recovery from being lost within yourself. Franceschi said the song was stylistic departure for the band, as they wanted to "soundtrack people's weekends." Helyer started the song, and "after four or five bottles of wine one night" he "nailed it" with Franceschi.

"Miracle in the Mourning" features R&B drums and post-punk keyboard work, and is followed by the pop song "3AM", which recalls the works of Beck. Franceschi said the latter was directly inspired by "Electric Feel" (2008) by MGMT. The bass-led "I O U" mixed R&B vibes with influence from hip hop musicians that the band enjoyed. The garage rock song "Predictable" evolved from a jam into a song while Franceschi was intoxicated at 3am and began spit balling lyrics. It went through a few different style changes, from reggae to hip hop to rock, incorporating the dark parts of their third studio album Sinners Never Sleep (2011). The closing track "Losing You" features synthesizers and distorted vocals evoked the work of Coldplay.

== Release ==
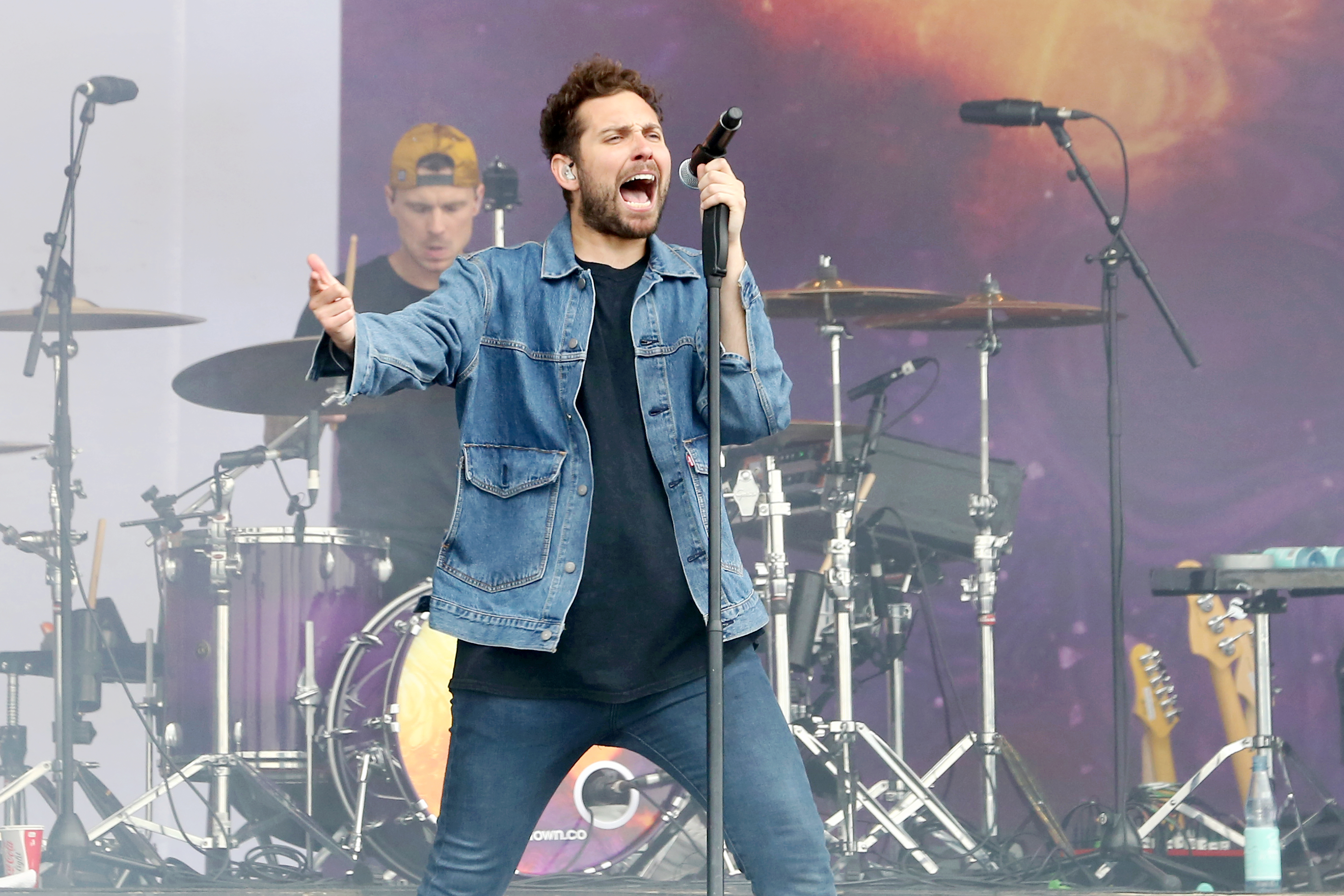
You Me at Six performing at a festival.

On 5 June 2018, You Me at Six's website was altered to include a big countdown clock. The following day, VI was announced for release in October. The album's track listing and artwork were revealed. In addition, "3AM" and "Fast Forward" were released as a double A-side single. The band originally planned to solely release "3AM", but added "Fast Forward" for the band's rock fans. Around this time, the band performed at the Download and Community festivals. On 1 August, a music video was released for "3AM". It was directed by Dan Broadley and filmed at The Mildmay Club in London. The video sees the band going on a night out to three different places and features the band doing a full dance routine at the end. The concept for the video came out after the band watched The Wolf of Wall Street (2013). Specifically, the scene where actor Leonardo DiCaprio lives through a split reality while being under the influence. Broadley loved a scene from the while where DiCaprio arrives from home while on drugs, before later revealing the true events that aspired. Broadley adapted it into a scenario where Franceschi performs as an alter-ego of himself. Franceschi worked with Broadley closely to help him boost his confidence in his role in the video. The group struggled with the dance routine, unable to keep in time; the version that appears in the video was edited together from the various takes they filmed.

"I O U" was made available for streaming on 6 August 2018, and released as a single four days later. "Back Again" was made available for streaming on 20 August following a premiere on BBC Radio 1. It was released as a single the following day. VI was released on 5 October 2018 through the band's own label Underdog Records and AWAL. Some copies included a bonus CD, titled The VI Sessions, that featured demos of "Predictable" and "Danger", and acoustic versions of "Back Again" and "Fast Forward". The Japanese edition featured the two acoustic versions as bonus tracks. Franceschi explained that the main reason behind starting Underdog Records was the end-goal of using it as a vehicle to sign artists from different genres. Franceschi said AWAL, a subsidiary of Kobalt, "embodied the spirit" of what the group were trying to do with their Underdog label. On the same day, a music video was released for "Back Again", directed by Broadley. Broadley's treatment for the clip was to pay homage to a cult classic film, namely The Big Lebowski (1998). It features a rumble at a bowling alley and Franceschi's dog getting kidnapped.

To promote the album's release, the band performed a series of in-store signings and performances. In November and December, the group went on a headlining UK tour with support from Marmozets and the Xcerts. At some of the shows, the band celebrated the anniversary of their debut album Take Off Your Colours (2008). The band took a break for the Christmas period, with the members opting to travel abroad. On 11 December, a lyric video was released for "Straight to My Head", directed by Peter Reever, and done in the animated style of Rick and Morty. In January and February 2019, the band embarked on a headlining tour of mainland European. On 22 February, the band released an acoustic version of "Back Again". In February and March, the band embarked on a US tour, dubbed Back Again Tour, with Dreamers and Machineheart. It was followed by three shows supporting Bring Me the Horizon on their Australian tour. In July and August, the band appeared at the 2000trees, Truck and Reading and Leeds Festivals. In September, they headlined Gunnersville festival, where they exclusively played their singles.

== Reception ==
Professional ratings
Aggregate scores
Source	Rating
Metacritic	74/100
Review scores
Source	Rating
The Arts Desk	3/5 stars
Belfast Telegraph	7/10
Dead Press!	7/10 stars
DIY	4/5 stars
Gigwise	7/10 stars
idobi	6/10
Kerrang!	4/5
The Music	4/5 stars
NME	4/5 stars
The Skinny	3/5 stars

VI was met with generally favourable reviews from music critics. At Metacritic, which assigns a normalized rating out of 100 to reviews from mainstream publications, the album received an average score of 74, based on six reviews.

Gigwise writer Anna Smith called VI a "risky jump towards sleek, glossy pop," merging the "best of their past and all the promise of their future". The Music's Emily Blackburn praised the album for its "fearless attitude and you can tell the band have just done whatever they’ve wanted, with no boundaries to bind them as they explore various tones and styles". Dead Press! editor Jacob Eynon wrote that "it seems as if another change in sound is exactly what they needed to launch themselves back to the top", adding that the album "proves You Me At Six had plenty to salvage, and that they don’t have to stick to past glories to keep doing what they do best". Ben Tipple of DIY called it a "reaffirmation of You Me At Six as a band, and a deliberate effort to reclaim their own sound", highlighting "Fast Forward" and "3AM" as "showcas[ing] two of the three sides You Me At Six have either honed or adopted" for the album.

Belfast Telegraph's Anna Reid wrote that the album was "versatile, with singles IOU and 3AM already proving their popularity". Kerrang! reviewer John Longbottom said it was a "compelling album that experiments with the YMAS sound more than ever before", suggesting that the "ability to shape-shift [is what] keeps the record interesting as it navigates from sound to sound". David Symth of Evening Standard said here was a "mix of styles here that not everything will appeal even to long-term fans but it suggests possible directions for album number seven". Dork Jasleen Dhindsa writer saw it as the band's "most genre-defying release yet," as it plays on their "distinctive ability to write unforgettable pop hooks, presented in a new territory of indie swagger and dance-driven synths".

Tara Garman NME writer said it was a "pleasure to see them testing the limits of their sonic template, and impressive that they’re continuing to do so on their sixth album". The Arts Desk's Thomas H Green said the album's sole "flaw – if it is one – is the pop ease of its sound", otherwise he found Franceschi's vocals to be "likeable, avoiding annoying contemporary vocal tics". Harriet Willis of The Skinny referred to the album as "undoubtedly You Me At Six's poppiest effort yet complete with funky, melodic beats and synths along with relatable themes of relationships, feelings and late night adventures". idobi reviewer Sam Devotta wrote that the album was "bold and loud but it doesn’t entirely hit the right marks for me", explaining that a "poppier album it’s not bad but it doesn’t feel distinctive enough to stand out from the crowd of other bands who have already established a similar sound".

VI reached number six in the UK, number eight in Scotland, number 19 on the US Billboard Top Heatseekers and number 73 in Australia. As of November 2018, the album has sold 11,559 copies in the UK. "I O U" peaked at number 19 on the UK Rock & Metal Singles Chart. Rock Sound ranked the album at number 23 on their list of the top 50 best releases from 2018. In 2021, Franceschi ranked VI as his third favourite You Me at Six album, stating that it "really felt like a renaissance of sorts for the band. We tried a lot of different things on this album sonically and even the way we approached the song writing".

== Track listing ==
All lyrics by Josh Franceschi. All songs written by You Me at Six. Additional writing on "Fast Forward and "Losing You" by Eg White, and on "Back Again", "3AM" and "Pray for Me" by Joel Pott.

No.	Title	Producer	Length
1.	"Fast Forward"	Dan Austin; You Me at Six; Eg White (add.)	3:14
2.	"Straight to My Head"	Austin; You Me at Six	3:37
3.	"Back Again"	Austin; You Me at Six; Joel Pott (add.)	2:56
4.	"Miracle in the Mourning"	Austin; You Me at Six	3:15
5.	"3AM"	Austin; You Me at Six; Pott (add.)	3:34
6.	"I O U"	Austin; You Me at Six	3:31
7.	"Pray for Me"	Pott	3:05
8.	"Predictable"	Austin; You Me at Six	3:56
9.	"Danger"	Austin; You Me at Six	3:11
10.	"Losing You"	White	3:30
Total length:			33:49

== Personnel ==
Personnel per booklet.

You Me at Six

- Josh Franceschi – lead vocals
- Max Helyer – rhythm guitar
- Chris Miller – lead guitar
- Matt Barnes – bass guitar
- Dan Flint – drums

Production and design

- Dan Austin – producer (all tracks except 7 and 10)
- You Me at Six – producer (all tracks except 7 and 10)
- Eg White – producer (track 10), additional production (track 1)
- Joel Pott – producer (track 7), additional production (tracks 3 and 5)
- Cenzo Townsend – mixing
- John Davis – mastering
- Drew Catmull – artwork, design

== Charts ==
Chart performance for VI
Chart (2018)	Peak position
Australian Albums (ARIA)	73
Scottish Albums (OCC)	8
UK Albums (OCC)	6
UK Independent Albums (OCC)	1
US Heatseekers Albums (Billboard)	19
