= Jealous Minds Think Alike =

Single by You Me at Six

from the album Take Off Your Colours
- B-side: "Blue Eyes Don't Lie"
- Released: 29 September 2008
- Genre: Pop punk
- Length: 7:12
- Songwriter(s): Matt Barnes, Dan Flint, Josh Franceschi, Max Helyer, Chris Miller
- Producer(s): Matt O'Grady, John Mitchell

You Me at Six singles chronology
"Gossip" (2008)	"Jealous Minds Think Alike" (2008)	"'Save It for the Bedroom" (2009)

"Jealous Minds Think Alike" is the fourth single by You Me at Six, and the third from their debut album Take Off Your Colours. As their first charting single, it charted at no. 100 in the UK Singles Chart. It was released on 29 September 2008.

== Track listing ==
1. "Jealous Minds Think Alike" - 3:38
2. "Blue Eyes Don't Lie" - 3:33

== Personnel ==
- Josh Franceschi - Lead Vocals
- Max Helyer - Rhythm Guitar
- Chris Miller - Lead Guitar
- Matt Barnes - Bass
- Dan Flint - Drums / Percussion
