= Save It for the Bedroom =

Single by You Me at Six

from the album Take Off Your Colours
- Released: 22 October 2007; 9 March 2009 (re-release)
- Genre: Pop punk, Emo
- Length: 4:06
- Label: Slam Dunk
- Songwriters: Matt Barnes, Dan Flint, Josh Franceschi, Max Helyer, Chris Miller
- Producers: Matt O'Grady, John Mitchell

You Me at Six singles chronology
"Save It for the Bedroom" (2007)	"If I Were in Your Shoes" (2008)

You Me at Six singles chronology
"Jealous Minds Think Alike" (2008)	"Save It for the Bedroom" (2009)	"Finders Keepers" (2009)

"Save It for the Bedroom" is the debut single by British rock band You Me at Six, originally released in 2007. A re-recorded version was released in March 2009. The original recording was produced by Jason Wilson at Stakeout Studios in Hampton. Wilson recorded all of their early work, helping develop the band's songwriting and performances from the age of 14.

The song is about how couples can tell abnormal behavioural styles of their partner leading to suspicion and then finally realising what has troubled them. In this case, sussing out that a partner has cheated on him/her (as the lyrics suggest). However, there is a mixed story when including the title as it shows a continuation of the relationship, "We'll save it for the bedroom".

The re-recorded version was featured on the soundtrack of Colin McRae: Dirt 2.

== Music video ==
In the music video, the band members are in a Jeremy Kyle type talk show, dressing up as anti-social teenagers and disgruntled members of the public and couples which leads into a fight near the end, that started by the lead singer.

=== 2007 original video ===
The original music video contains video excerpts of the band on tour, filmed all by a video camera of one of the band members. It features all band members and some touring crew partying and in some scenes has the band on stage playing the song live on separate tour dates. It is believed the footage is from their support tours with Angels & Airwaves, New Found Glory and the Audition.

== Track listing ==
2007 original recording track listing

1. "Save It for the Bedroom" – 4:06
2. "You've Made Your Bed" – 4:30

2009 re-recorded version track listing

1. "Save It for the Bedroom" – 4:14
2. "Sweet Feet" – 3:40

== Personnel ==
- Josh Franceschi - lead vocals
- Chris Miller - lead guitar
- Max Helyer - rhythm guitar / backing vocals
- Matt Barnes - bass
- Dan Flint - drums / percussion
