= Night People (You Me at Six album) =

Studio album by You Me at Six
- Released: 6 January 2017
- Recorded: February and June 2016
- Studios: Black Bird, Nashville, Tennessee
- Genres: Pop rock; alternative rock; hard rock
- Length: 35:23
- Label: Infectious
- Producer: Jacquire King

You Me at Six chronology
Cavalier Youth (2014)	Night People (2017)	VI (2018)

Singles from Night People
- 1. "Night People" Released: 23 August 2016; 2. "Plus One" Released: 3 October 2016; 3. "Give" Released: 4 November 2016; 4. "Swear" Released: 23 November 2016; 5. "Heavy Soul" Released: 21 December 2016; 6. "Take on the World" Released: 24 March 2017

Night People is the fifth studio album by English rock band You Me at Six. Following an 18-month touring cycle for Cavalier Youth, the group took a break. In the autumn, the group worked on new music at drummer Dan Flint's house, and subsequently tracked demos with Ross Orton. Reconvening in January 2016, the group were in discussions with several different producers before being approached by Jacquire King. The group then went to Nashville, Tennessee to record their new album with King in February. Majority of the album was recorded live-in-the-studio, an approach the group hadn't attempted before. The group returned home to write more material before returning to the studio. Recording subsequently wrapped up in June. Night People was announced in August, followed by the single release of the title-track.

Preceded by the single release of "Plus One", the group went on a UK tour in October. In November, the group released two singles ("Give" and "Swear") before embarking on a European tour. Before the end of the year, "Heavy Soul" was released as a single. Night People released on 6 January 2017 through Infectious Music. It charted at number 3 in the UK, as well as charting in Australia, Belgium and New Zealand. Eight of its ten tracks charted on the UK Rock & Metal Singles Chart. Following its release, "Take on the World" was released as a single in March, and the group went on a tour of the UK. Over the summer, the group went on a tour of the US, performed at BBC Radio 1's Big Weekend, the Reading and Leeds Festivals and Sundown festival.

== Background ==
You Me at Six released their fourth studio album Cavalier Youth in January 2014. The group supported it with an 18-month long touring cycle, which included the band's first arena tour, and ended with an appearance at the Isle of Wight Festival in June 2015. Following this, the band's social media accounts went inactive. After the preceding ten years of constant touring, the band members went on a break, which vocalist Josh Franceschi considered to be "necessary to appreciate the things we had, to get off the ride for a little bit." During the break, the band members refrained from listening to the radio or rock albums, instead consuming hip hop, UK grime, soul and funk music.

In an interview with Kerrang! in May 2015, guitarist Max Helyer revealed that the band would be meeting up in the summer to work on new ideas. Franceschi said that due to the touring schedule for Cavalier Youth they did not write any new material between 2013 and 2015. Around this time, drummer Dan Flint said the band were intending to release their next album with Korda Marshall and his label Infectious Music. In the autumn, the band built a personal studio at Flint's house, which would allow them to work whenever they wished. The band visited Flint's studio as often as three or four times a week to write new material; the group ended up writing 50–60 new songs. Following demoing sessions in Sheffield with Ross Orton, the vision for the group's next album began to form, as Franceschi explains: "Out of that process we knew that we were necessarily going down the right route—musically, mentally, everything."

== Production ==
You Me at Six reconvened in January 2016 with no immediate plans to record a new album, nor any idea of who might produce it. After having discussions with several different producers, the group were approached by Jacquire King in early February. King offered the band the chance to record in Nashville, Tennessee, and "literally three days later", according to Franceschi, the band boarded a plane to Nashville. The group was so eager to record that they flew before their management had been able to figure out accommodation in the city. In the past, the group had "screaming matches with some of our producers", according to Franceschi; to avoid stressing out King or themselves, the band's management recommended they took a meditation class prior to recording. Recording for Night People took place at Black Bird Studios with King producing the sessions.

The group entered the studio with six to eight songs, and planned to record for three weeks. King wanted to record a rock album with the band, something he had not done since Kings of Leon's Only by the Night in 2008. According to Franceschi, King's "attitude was very much, ‘I can’t have you make a record with me unless it’s your best record, and I want it to be the best rock record I’ve made.’" The group had wanted to work with King for Cavalier Youth but they "didn’t think he’d even return our phone call." King asked the group if they had recorded live-in-the-studio before, to which they replied they hadn't. After attempting it, King was instantly impressed with how well the group worked as a cohesive unit: "I've not seen a band play like that in a long, long fucking time. I can tell you guys know each inside out."

They recorded the songs one-by-one instead of layering instruments, which Flint said aided in their creativity. After finishing eight songs, they went home to write more material, before returning to Black Bird in June. They completed four more tracks, and then recorded overdubs. Working in Nashville, the band were "so focused and determined at the same [time]", according to Franceschi. He added that the process was different from when they recorded Sinners Never Sleep (2011) and Cavalier Youth "in California, where we were socializing and partying ... We put a lot of time, a lot of dedication into [Night People]". Flint used a variety of drum kits as the studio had a room full of equipment. Franceschi later said the band felt complacent when trying to be creative and self-motivating, in addition to being around people that were not stimulating the band creatively. On one occasion, Franceschi found himself emailing his lyrics to four-to-five for approval. Andrew Scheps mixed the recordings, while Eric Boulanger mastered them.

== Composition ==
All of the songs on the album, apart from "Plus One", "Take on the World" and "Can't Hold Back", were written by the band. "Plus One" and "Can't Hold Back" were written by the band and former Longpigs frontman Crispin Hunt, while "Take on the World" was written by the band and Iain Archer. Franceschi wrote all of the songs' lyrics, and attempted to give them "its own character, its own sort of perspective." Discussing the album's title, Franceschi explained: "Most bands have a kinda 4pm to 4am existence, ... so it seemed like an appropriate title for a rock record." The album's sound has been described as pop rock, alternative rock, and hard rock. Rock groups such as Led Zeppelin, the Rolling Stones, the Beatles, the Who, Muse, the Strokes and the Killers have been cited as influencing Night People. Six months after the album's releases, Franceschi counted that they were "focused so much on trying to make a body of work and trying to get them to work together that we might have overlooked if they were standout songs on their own".

The blues rock title-track "Night People" was one of the first songs the group wrote for the record. Flint worked on the song by using Pro-Tools; he attempted to make a rock song with influence from hip hop. With the idea of playing it in a live setting, he wanted to find a way where his drums would build upon the patterns he came up with. "Plus One" was written while Franceschi was playing an acoustic guitar during the group's first recording session at Black Bird Studios. The group worked on it as a full-band song at Flint's home studio. Franceschi described the song's lyrics as being about the "pursuit of someone you've wanted for a long time." The song is a grunge track that opens with a feedback introduction, and was compared to Nirvana. "Heavy Soul" was put together during a rehearsal which Franceschi could not attend due to being ill. Flint sent a demo of the song to Franceschi, who exclaimed, "Fucking hell, lads, this is good!" Its chorus section recalled the Foo Fighters; Franceschi said the song's lyrics talk about the "heartbreak when you’re no longer in love with the idea of being a musician and what that might mean." "Take on the World" is a Snow Patrol and Coldplay-esque ballad that the band knew would be a "big anthem."

"Brand New" came about from Helyer when he was playing a guitar part during band practice. He said he wrote the pre-chorus and chorus sections after listening to Bruce Springsteen and the Who. The song's lyrics were partially written on behalf of people in Franceschi's life and talks about "not letting the past dictate your future." The track takes influence from shoegaze and 1980s synth-pop. "Swear" was the first song written for the album, shortly after the group's performance at the Isle of Wight Festival. With it, the group wanted a song that was reminiscent of "Loverboy" in the bass and drums, as well as being "more in line with what we are listening to now", according to Helyer. The song initially started out as a verse and evolved into a fully finished song in an hour; it was reminiscent of the work of Royal Blood. According to Franceschi, the group wanted the bassline to "almost be offensive, and make people feel like they're being attacked." The song's lyrics are partially "where you’re pursuing someone not necessarily for a confrontation, but for an answer, or an apology, perhaps", according to Franceschi. Franceschi wanted the lyrics to complement the "intensity of the music."

Franceschi considered the middle eight of "Make Your Move" to be the "heaviest piece of music" on the album, "almost flirt[ing] with a Limp Bizkit kind of vibe." While working in Flint's studio, Franceschi tracked a demo of "Can't Hold Back" consisting solely of a guitar riff and a middle eight. The group later altered the structure of the song, according to Franceschi "a hundred times" and almost abandoned it. The lyrics to it were influenced by the Arctic Monkeys' "Fake Tales of San Francisco". Arctic Monkeys frontman Alex Turner has "always been really good in setting scenes with his lyrics, and I was kinda trying to do something similar here", according to Franceschi. With "Spell It Out", Franceschi attempted to write a song that could "almost fit as a sync to a movie trailer or some Game Of Thrones battle scene." While performing at an Australian festival, Franceschi spotted Sticky Fingers, who have "one song that had a slow tempo but was really euphoric", which inspired Franceschi to write "Give". Franceschi would frequently play the guitar riff to it during rehearsals. Within an hour, the group had the finished song. Heyler said that when the group heard Franceschi's melody for the chorus, "we all knew that it was a special song straight away."

== Release ==
On 10 August 2016, the band hosted a livestream on their Twitter account. The livestream lasted an hour, revealing the hashtag "#NIGHTPEOPLE" and a logo. This led to speculation of a new album, which was later revealed to be titled Night People. The following day, the band posted an image with the phrase "Raise a glass to tomorrow's blues" over it. On 22 August, Night People was announced for release, and the album's artwork and track listing was revealed. A day later, "Night People" was released as a single. On 8 September, a music video was released for the title-track, directed by Ryan Vernava and Liam Achaibu. "Plus One" was released as a single on 3 October. In October, the band went a tour of the UK with support from VANT. The following month, the band went on a tour of Europe with support from Lower Than Atlantis. "Give" was released as a single on 4 November. A Vaults remix of "Night People" was released as a single on 18 November.

"Swear" was released as a single on 23 November. Heyler said the group did not want to release it as a single as it sounded too much "like a You Me at Six-sounding song" since "Night People" displayed a different sound for them. A day later, a music video was released for the song, film during the band's performance at the Shepherd's Bush Empire in London. "Heavy Soul" was released as a single on 21 December. Night People was initially planned for release on 13 January 2017; bassist Matt Barnes said the band picked this as they wanted toshow that they were "all anti-superstitious". It was instead released on 6 January 2017 through Infectious Music. Franceschi said the group had discussed releasing the album before Christmas, however, "sometimes if you put your record out towards the end of the year, it feels like last year’s music". He added that they went with a January 2017 release "because we wanted it to be the rock record of 2017". They released it on cassette tape as guitarist Chris Miller had an old BMW car with a cassette player built in and toyed with the idea of listening to the album on that format. The Japanese edition of the album included live versions of "Night People", "Plus One" and "Swear", recorded at Shepherd's Bush Empire, as bonus tracks.

On 7 February, a music video was released for "Give", also filmed at Shepherd's Bush Empire. Franceschi said that the video wasn't originally meant to have live performance footage. Instead, it would have been "footage [of the band] and the content for that song". The group's label however thought the performance would work as a video. "Take on the World" was released as a single on 24 March. The band went on a tour of the UK in April with support from Tonight Alive and Black Foxxes. Following this, Spotify Live was released, featuring versions of "Swear", "Take on the World", "Give", and "Night People". An AlunaGeorge remix of "Take on the World" was released as a single on 28 April. In early May, released a video for "Take on the World", filmed during a performance at Alexandra Palace in London. Later in the month, the band went on a tour of the US and performed at BBC Radio 1's Big Weekend festival. In late August, the band performed at the Reading and Leeds Festivals, followed by headlining Sundown festival in early September. On 8 September, an acoustic EP, titled Acoustic in Amsterdam, was released an included versions of "Take on the World", "Brand New", "Night People" and "Give". Following this, the group performed a few shows in Australia.

== Reception ==
Professional ratings
Aggregate scores
Source	Rating
AnyDecentMusic?	5.4/10
Metacritic	67/100
Review scores
Source	Rating
Clash	4/10
DIY	4/5 stars
The Guardian	3/5 stars
The Independent	3/5 stars
Kerrang!	4/5
London Evening Standard	3/5 stars
The Observer	2/5 stars
Rock Sound	8/10
Rolling Stone Australia	3/5 stars
Ultimate Guitar	7/10

Night People was met with generally favourable reviews from music critics.At Metacritic, which assigns a normalized rating out of 100 to reviews from mainstream publications, the album received an average score of 67, based on nine reviews. AnyDecentMusic? gave it an average score of 5.4, based on ten reviews.

DIY reviewer Sarah Jamieson called it "[c]onfident and self-assured," based around the "feeling than the ... riffs and sugary highs" of their past work, with the live energy providing a "a depth they've never quite managed to nail before." Rock Sound writer Rob Sayce noted that the band "opted for a grittier, more stripped back approach" than the bigger sound of Cavalier Youth. He added that it was "[c]rammed with skyscraping melodies and moments of spine-tingling poignancy" that could give them "best possible stead for packing out stadiums and headlining festivals in the near future." Ultimate Guitar staff member Sam Mendez wrote that "as opposed to their previous album's pop rock initiative stuck on crafting rousing arena rock ballads," Night People performed better "than its predecessor, pulling inspiration from more sources in order to make an album that showcases a more interesting array of styles and moods." The Guardian's Kate Hutchinson said that against the band's peers "peddling the same generic chart angst ... YMAS attempt to suggest they might have gonads behind the guitars."

Andre Paine of the London Evening Standard wrote that the "vaguely over-familiar hard rock might be fine in concert," however, "on record diminishing returns soon set in.". Rolling Stone Australia writer Rod Yates said that the band had been unable to have chart success out of the UK, and Night People "will likely not change that." The Independent music correspondent Roisin O'Connor said the songs were "loaded with anguished and often clichéd lyrics about ruined relationships, but sometimes that’s what you need to hear." She called Night People a "painfully disjointed album that shows a band at an impasse, unsure about which direction they want to go in." The Observer reviewer Emily Mackay said the album would "cement their success among fans of Foo Fighters and Biffy Clyro. Unlike those bands, however, You Me at Six still seem to have little originality or depth to offer."

Night People charted at number 3 in the UK, after selling 14,318 copies in its first week. It charted at number 3 in Scotland, number 20 in Australia and number 84 in Belgium. It also charted at number 1 on the New Zealand Heatseekers Albums chart. Most of the tracks on the album charted on the UK Rock & Metal Singles Chart: "Night People" at number 4, "Plus One" at number 24, "Heavy Soul" at number 17, "Take on the World" at number 1, "Brand New" at number 21, "Swear" at number 19, "Spell It Out" at number 32 and "Give" at number 5. "Take on the World" was certified silver by the British Phonographic Industry (BPI) in October 2022. As early as August 2017, Franceschi said the band were unhappy with how they made it. Helyer, meanwhile, said he did not "look at that record with bad memories; we had a great experience". In 2021, Franceschi ranked Night People as his fifth favourite You Me at Six album, admiring Blackbird as he "could never have of imagined us making a record in Nashville but it was incredible".

== Track listing ==
All songs written by You Me at Six, except where noted. All lyrics by Josh Franceschi.

No.	Title	Writer(s)	Length
1.	"Night People"		3:03
2.	"Plus One"	You Me at Six; Crispin Hunt	2:34
3.	"Heavy Soul"		3:54
4.	"Take On the World"	You Me at Six; Iain Archer	4:31
5.	"Brand New"		3:20
6.	"Swear"		2:45
7.	"Make Your Move"		3:40
8.	"Can't Hold Back"	You Me at Six; Hunt	3:53
9.	"Spell It Out"		4:27
10.	"Give"		3:16
Total length:			35:23

== Personnel ==
Personnel per booklet.

You Me at Six

- Josh Franceschi – lead vocals
- Chris Miller – lead guitar
- Max Helyer – rhythm guitar
- Matt Barnes – bass guitar
- Dan Flint – drums

Production

- Jacquire King – production, programming
- Andrew Scheps – mixing
- Eric Boulanger – mastering
- Studio Juice – art direction
- Alex Page – photography
- David East – photography
- Max Fairlough – photography
- Matt Salacuse – photography

== Charts ==
Chart performance for Night People
Chart (2017)	Peak position
Australian Albums (ARIA)	20
Belgian Albums (Ultratop Flanders)	84
Dutch Albums (Album Top 100)	172
New Zealand Heatseekers Albums (RMNZ)	1
Scottish Albums (Official Charts)	3
UK Albums (Official Charts)	3
UK Independent Albums (Official Charts)	1
UK Rock & Metal Albums (Official Charts)	1
