= Kiss and Tell (You Me at Six song) =

Single by You Me At Six

from the album Kiss and Tell EP and Take Off Your Colours
- Released: 7 September 2009
- Genre: Pop punk
- Length: 3:19
- Label: Virgin

You Me At Six singles chronology
"Finders Keepers" (2009)	"Kiss and Tell" (2009)	"Underdog" (2010)

"Kiss and Tell" is a song by You Me at Six, released as a single on 7 September 2009 through Virgin. The single was released on CD, digital download and 7" vinyl, with the former two having an additional track, a cover of Lady Gaga's "Poker Face". It would later feature on the deluxe edition of Take Off Your Colours. The song is a first person narrative about a girl that everybody wants, and how she has a promiscuous nature and "Kisses and Tells". The song received considerable airplay across Radio 1 as well as topping both the Kerrang! and NME charts. In support of the single, the band played a short five date headline tour in intimate venues, including the London Camden Underworld, as well as two in-store shows. It also gained much media coverage. "Kiss and Tell" peaked at number 42 in the UK charts.

== Music video ==
The music video features the band at a house party performing with various shots of people partying.

== Track listing ==
CD version
No.	Title	Length
1.	"Kiss and Tell"	3:23
2.	"Poker Face" (Lady Gaga cover)	3:14

7" vinyl and digital versions
No.	Title	Length
1.	"Kiss and Tell"	3:23
2.	"Kiss and Tell" (acoustic)	3:58

iTunes EP
No.	Title	Length
1.	"Kiss and Tell"	3:23
2.	"Poker Face" (Lady Gaga cover)	3:14
3.	"Kiss and Tell" (acoustic)	3:58

== Chart performance ==
Chart (2009)	Peak Position
UK Singles (OCC)	42

== Personnel ==
- Josh Franceschi - Lead vocals
- Chris Miller - Lead guitar
- Max Heyler - Rhythm Guitar
- Matt Barnes - Bass
- Dan Flint - Drums / Percussion
