= Take Off Your Colours =

Studio album by You Me at Six
- Released: 6 October 2008
- Recorded: March – May 2008
- Studios: Outhouse, Reading, England; Masterlink, Guildford, England
- Genres: Pop-punk; emo pop
- Length: 51:09
- Label: Slam Dunk
- Producers: Matt O'Grady; John Mitchell

You Me at Six chronology
| Untitled EP (2007) | Take Off Your Colours (2008) | Hold Me Down (2010) |

Singles from Take Off Your Colours
- 1. "If I Were in Your Shoes" Released: 17 March 2008; 2. "Gossip" Released: 28 July 2008; 3. "Jealous Minds Think Alike" Released: 29 September 2008; 4. "Save It for the Bedroom" Released: 9 March 2009

Singles from Take Off Your Colours (US edition)
- 1. "Finders Keepers" Released: 25 May 2009; 2. "Kiss and Tell" Released: 7 September 2009

Take Off Your Colours is the debut studio album by English rock band You Me at Six, originally released on 6 October 2008 through Slam Dunk Records. After forming in 2004, they released an EP titled We Know What It Means to Be Alone in 2006, and went on a tour with Elliot Minor in support of the release. After releasing "Save It for the Bedroom" as a single to promote their tour, the band gained attention from both independent and major record labels.

Following their tour with Elliot Minor, the writing process for the new album began. Although all the music's writing was credited to the entire band, vocalist Josh Franceschi and guitarist Max Helyer were usually the biggest creative forces among the group, being responsible for songs' concepts. The album was recorded in two weeks at Outhouse Studios in Reading, Berkshire with producers Matt O'Grady and John Mitchell. The band's work resulted in Take Off Your Colours displaying a sound that most critics associated with pop-punk, though this result was unintended. Specifically, the record was noted to sound similar to the work of Fall Out Boy, New Found Glory, and Panic! at the Disco.

"If I Were In Your Shoes", "Gossip", and "Jealous Minds Think Alike" were released as singles to promote the album, the latter of which became the band's first charting song. During the album's recording sessions, "Save It for the Bedroom" was re-recorded, and this version became the album's fourth single. Two more singles, "Finders Keepers" and "Kiss and Tell", later appeared on re-releases of the album. The latter four singles managed to chart, and the album itself peaked at number 25 on the UK Albums Chart. Take Off Your Colours was certified gold in the UK for shipments of 100,000 copies in July 2012.

== Background ==
Guitarists Josh Franceschi and Max Helyer previously played in a short-lived band at school, prior to You Me at Six. After Franceschi wanted to become a vocalist, him and Helyer jammed for a few months, until bassist and college friend Matt Barnes began playing with them. Franceschi knew of Barnes from the local music scene; the three of them decided to form a band. Guitarist Chris Miller, who lived on the same street as Barnes, was brought into the fold, followed by drummer Joe Philips. This marked the formation of You Me at Six in 2004, basing themselves in Weybridge, Surrey. For their early shows, the gigs would be booked solely on the amount of screaming they could coax from the audiences. As their local scene leaned on heavy-sounding music, the band had to push themselves to win over the crowds, eventually earning a notable reputation amongst their peers. Despite some of the members still attending college, the band became their main priority. They rehearsed three to four times a week, accumulating enough songs for their debut album. With the money from their shows, they self-released their debut EP, We Know What It Means to Be Alone, on New Year's Day 2007.

You Me at Six had a heavy focus on performing in Surrey and parts of London. They traveled to these shows, which had been planned through the Myspace platform, by travelling via MegaBus. In April 2007, they appeared at a showcase of up-and-coming artists at the Camden Underworld in London, and by the following month, they supported Saosin in Leeds. These performances attracted attention from Kerrang! and NME. At the end of May 2007, they opened the Slam Dunk Festival, which allowed them to grow their fan base outside of their regional scene. Phillips left the band amidst creative differences on their direction. Dan Flint, another college friend, was initially asked to fill in on drums for a tour. He ended up becoming Phillips' permanent replacement after Slam Dunk. Ben Ray, who ran the festival, was interested in managing the band and putting out their music. They played another show at the Camden Underworld in June 2007; by this point, they had acquired a press agent and were starting to attract attention from people in the music industry.

Over the next two months, they played support slots for one-off shows with Paramore and Furthest Drive, and joined This Is Goodbye on their national tour. Around this time, You Me at Six self-released an untitled EP. Preceded by a show supporting Fightstar, You Me at Six went on tour with Elliot Minor, during which both bands released singles. "Save It for the Bedroom" was released on 22 October 2007 through Slam Dunk Records, a label co-founded by the band with help from their manager and fans. The single featured "You've Made Your Bed (So Sleep in It)" as the B-side, and both tracks would later appear on Take Off Your Colours. A music video for "Save It for the Bedroom" had been released a few days prior and was directed by Lawrence Hardy. The band's release sold more copies than Elliot Minor's single, which was released through a major label. This situation made it clear to the band that, according to Franceschi, "major labels are good but over the years they have totally lost touch of what sells." By this time, the group was in discussion with a range of independent and major labels.

== Writing and recording ==
Following the Elliot Minor tour, You Me at Six began writing material for their debut album. In late November and early December 2007, the band went on their first headlining tour of the UK, with support from Flood of Red. During the latter month, the band wrote further material. Typically, Helyer or Franceschi would have an idea that the band would then flesh out together. Occasionally, the band would record demos and change sections of them. By this point, Franceschi dropped out of college while Helyer and Miller continued their studies. In February and March 2008, they went on a UK tour with the Audition. Prior to going into a studio, You Me at Six had finished seven-to-eight completed songs. The band recorded their debut album over the course of two weeks, between March and May 2008 at Outhouse Studios in Reading, Berkshire.

Matt O'Grady and John Mitchell handled producer duties, with Mitchell also mixing the proceedings, while Tim Turan mastered the album. The band were in awe of O'Grady as they were fans of his former band Fastlane, Author Neil Daniels, in his book You Me at Six – Never Hold an Underdog Down (2015) said O'Grady's past experience made him the "perfect guy" to be their engineer. O'Grady encouraged Franceschi's vocal performance, as Flint explained: "Getting into the studio was very daunting for all of us, and Matt gave him the confidence to express how he felt, to know that he really could sing." Helyer said as they only used one amplifier, the guitar tone remained the same throughout the album. "Save It for the Bedroom" and "You've Made Your Bed (So Sleep in It)", which were initially released as a single in 2007, were re-recorded during the album's studio sessions. Franceschi's sister Elissa provided additional vocals on "Always Attract".

== Composition and lyrics ==
The album's sound has been described by critics as pop-punk and emo pop. Daniels said it displayed a "promising young band making a collection of competent, perhaps quite Americanised songs", and as such, noted influences from All Time Low, Blink-182 and Four Year Strong. He added that You Me at Six "felt like they needed to push themselves ... to make more complicated and diverse [guitar] riffs". The group did not intentionally compose a pop-punk album but "it just sort of came [out] like that," according to Barnes. The band's sound was an attempt to emulate the sound of popular pop-punk groups such as Fall Out Boy and Panic! at the Disco, which was noted by a reviewer. By contrast, the We Know What It Means to Be Alone EP was compared to the sound of the Academy Is..., Paramore and other acts on the record label Fueled by Ramen, while Untitled incorporated influences from Incubus, Jimmy Eat World and Taking Back Sunday. At the time, the group was listening to bands such as Blink-182, New Found Glory, and, according to Barnes, "all that sort of Drive-Thru scene." One of the members described it as "a mixture of genres. Some songs are pop-punk and some are rockier and heavier."

The title, Take Off Your Colours, is a quote from a line by the orphan leader in the film The Warriors (1979). Daniels said it features gangs in New York City that would be "distinguished from one another by the colours they wear". The specific scene that informed the name is where children at an orphanage tell one gang to remove their colours, in order to "lose its identity as a collective force whilst as individuals the gang members would also lose their identity". He added that the band members acted as themselves and expected as much from their peers "so the title is not about gangs but rather the concept of personal identity". Flint said Franceschi sung about attending house parties, being young and flirting with girls.

The album opens with "The Truth Is a Terrible Thing", which recalled the sound New Found Glory. Daniels said it begins with a "nifty lead riff" that the rest of the band use to "spring into action". "Call That a Comeback" is an anthemic pop-punk song, and is followed by "Jealous Minds Think Alike", the chorus section of which was compared to the work of Panic! at the Disco. "Save It for the Bedroom" is about couples that find how one of them is cheating through behavioural patterns. "You've Made Your Bed (So Sleep in It)" discusses a breakup, and is followed by "If You Run", which displays Francheschi's skills as a vocalist. "Tigers and Sharks" evoked the early work of Taking Back Sunday, and features shoegaze guitar riffs. "Always Attract" is an acoustic ballad, with vocal harmonies from Franceschi and his sister Elissa, which are done in the vein of Brand New. Preceded by the emo song "Nasty Habits", the album closes with "The Rumour", which has Latin-like rhythms. One of the bonus tracks, "Kiss and Tell", discusses boys wanting to kiss a girl they find attractive.

== Release and touring ==
A music video was released for "If I Were in Your Shoes" on 14 February 2008, while it was officially announced as single on 17 March through Slam Dunk, with "Taste" as the B-side. By June 2008, they started working with the press relations company Chuff Media and Mark Ngui from management company Primary Talent International. On 26 June, it was announced the band had signed a one-album contract with Slam Dunk. Franceschi explained that if the group wished to move to a bigger label, they "can easily move on [or] if we are happy we [will] stay [on Slam Dunk]". "Gossip" was released as the second single, with "All Your Fault" as the B-side, on 28 July 2008. A music video for the song was also released. On 11 August of the same year, the band released "If You Run" as a free download from their website.

On 11 September 2008, a music video was released for "Jealous Minds Think Alike", which was directed by Shane Davey. The song was released as a single on 29 September, with "Blue Eyes Don't Lie" as the B-side. It was the band's first single to chart, peaking at number 100 on the UK Singles Chart in November. The album, Take Off Your Colours was released on 6 October 2008 through Slam Dunk. In December 2008, they signed to management company Raw Power Management, who would help gain then a deal in the United States with independent label Epitaph Records. On 19 February 2009, the band released a second music video for "Save It for the Bedroom", which was directed by Davey. It sees the band appearing as guests on the fictional Lazarus Ironside show, eventually leading into a fight similar to those seen on The Jeremy Kyle Show and Jerry Springer. The video was directly inspired by the former, while the show's host was played by actor Joerg Stadler. "Save It for the Bedroom" was released as a single on 9 March.

The band's signing to Epitaph Records was made public on 10 March 2009. The band were excited about working with the label, as they knew Epitaph for helping other acts reach the main stage of Warped Tour and be able to tour internationally. Franceschi later recounted that they "never really saw any of that, they practically did nothing for us, fucking nothing whatsoever," concluding that he never even met the label's founder Brett Gurewitz. Following a premier on BBC Radio 1 on April 6, "Finders Keepers" was released as a single to precede the album on 25 May. Epitaph made Take Off Your Colours available for streaming on 16 July, ahead of its US release five days later. In addition to the studio and acoustic versions of "Finders Keepers", this version featured several bonus tracks: an acoustic version of "Save It for the Bedroom", the B-sides to "Gossip", "Jealous Minds Think Alike", and the album version of "Save It for the Bedroom". The US iTunes version of Take Off Your Colours also includes "Kiss and Tell", a song which would later be released as a single to promote a UK limited edition of the album.

"Kiss and Tell" was released as a single on 7 September 2009; the song's music video features a house party. The track was issued a week before the limited edition of Take Off Your Colours was released in the UK. In addition to "Kiss and Tell", it features the original album on one disc and another disc of additional songs: "Finders Keepers", and B-sides to the "Gossip", "Jealous Minds Think Alike", and re-recorded "Save It for the Bedroom" singles. In 2021, Franceschi ranked Take Off Your Colours as his least favourite You Me at Six album, stating that it had a "lot of heart and teen angst on that album which I don’t think we could truly do again even if we tried".

=== Tenth anniversary ===
To celebrate the album's tenth anniversary, the band added three shows to their 2018 UK tour in support of their sixth album VI. The band announced they would perform Take Off Your Colours in its entirety after the initial show at a given venue for VI on select dates. They played these special performances on 24 November at Manchester's Victoria Warehouse, 28 November at Glasgow's Barrowland Ballroom, and 2 December at London's O2 Brixton Academy. While promoting these shows and celebrating the record's tenth anniversary, they were also featured on the November issue of Rock Sound; included with its special edition were poster prints that were hand-signed by the band, a 16-page photo collection from the Take Off Your Colours era, and other bonus material. Prior to these anniversary shows, "Call That a Comeback" had never been performed live. "Gossip" and "Nasty Habits" had also been among the first of the band's songs to be retired from their setlists. By November 2009, Franceschi described playing the material live as having "become suffocated almost and we've really overplayed some of them". Prior to Slam Dunk Festival 2015, there were rumours that the band was going to perform Take Off Your Colours in its entirety. Franceschi later explained the band would be "extensively paying homage to that with songs" from the album.

== Touring ==
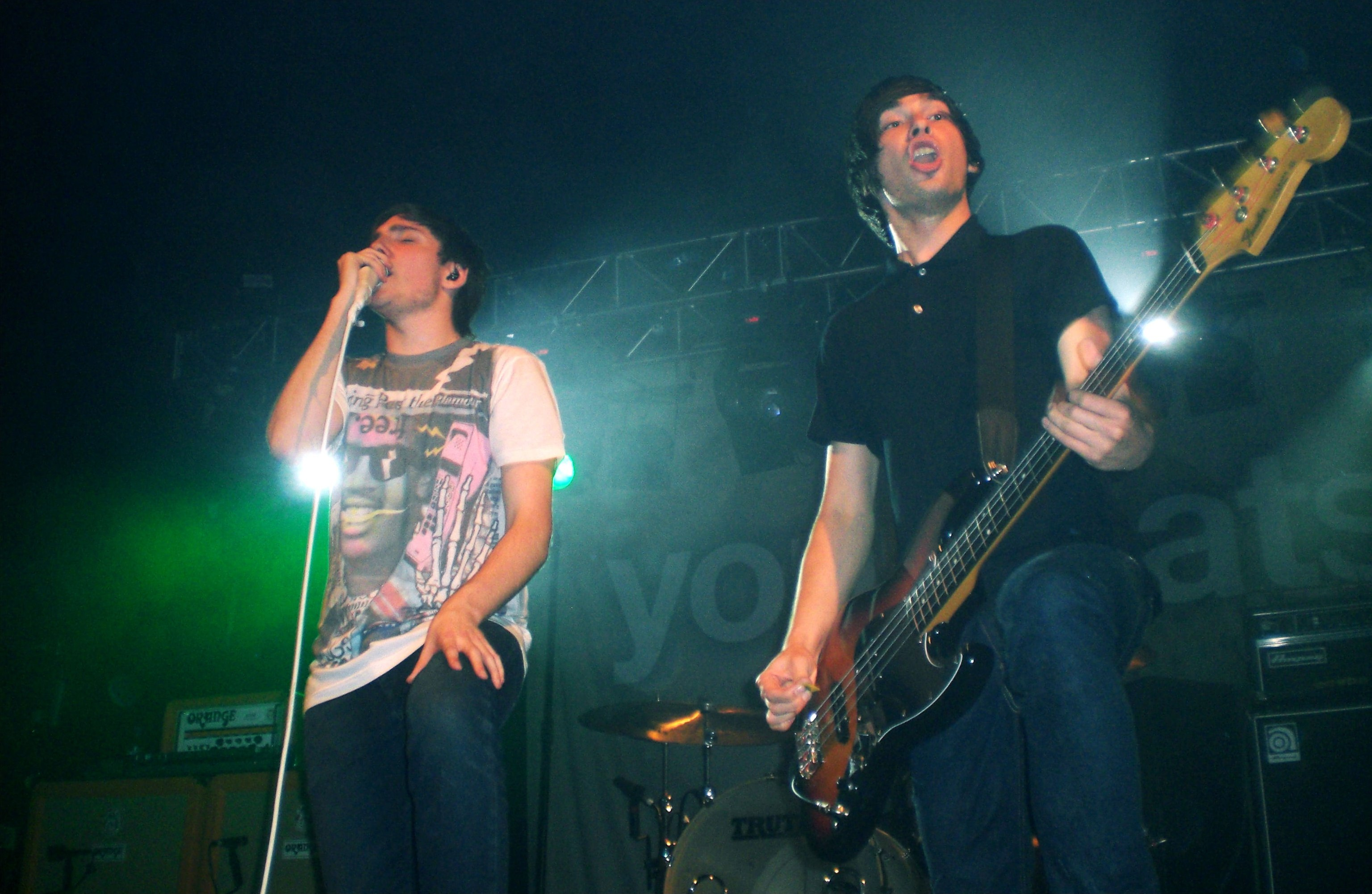
Vocalist Josh Franceschi (left) and bassist Matt Barnes (right) performing in October 2008.

You Me at Six supported Angels & Airwaves for a one-off show, and then embarked on a headlining tour in smaller venues in June 2008, with support from This Is Goodbye. They performed at Reading Festival 2008, and the audience was larger than their tent's capacity. The band did a series of in-store performances to help promote the release of Take Off Your Colours in October 2008. Later in the month, the band toured in the UK, with support from Houston Calls and Farewell. In March 2009, You Me at Six embarked on a UK, named the 777 Tour, with support from the Spill Canvas and Emarosa. Later in the month, they performed at the South by Southwest music conference in the US.

You Me at Six headlined the Slam Dunk Festival in May 2009, and embarked on a UK tour in June 2009, with support from Not Advised and Me Vs Hero. In between dates, You Me at Six performed at the Download and GuilFest festivals. In August 2009, You Me at Six went on the Warped Tour, playing to crowds of 600-to-700. During their stint on it, they sold 2,000 copies of their debut. They gave themselves the goal of selling $1,000 worth of t-shirts each day of the trek, and ultimately made $3,200 on the first day alone. Returning to the UK, they performed at the Reading and Leeds Festivals. In early September, the band did some small, intimate club shows in the UK.

== Reception ==
Professional ratings
Review scores
| Source | Rating |
|---|---|
| AllMusic | 2.5/5 stars |
| Alternative Addiction | 2.5/5 stars |
| Alternative Press | 3/5 stars |
| Alter the Press! | 3/5 |
| Big Cheese | 5/5 stars |
| God Is in the TV | 3.5/5 |
| Kerrang! | 4/5 stars |
| Rock Sound | 7/10 |
| Strange Glue | 7/10 |
| The Observer | 4/5 stars |

=== Critical reception ===
Reviews for the album were generally positive. Alter the Press! reviewer Sean Reid said the album showed the band had "potential to reach the level of success as bands such as Fall Out Boy and Panic At The Disco." Jen Walker of Big Cheese called the album "a refreshing English pop punk debut", which contained "clear musical influences" from New Found Glory, Panic! at the Disco, and Brand New. Strange Glue reviewer Aidan Williamson praised the album's hooks. The Observer described the band's sound to be "the UK's answer to Fall Out Boy," with reviewer Emma Johnston choosing "Jealous Minds Think Alike" as a highlight.

In a lukewarm review, Alternative Addiction described the album as such: "Think Fallout Boy [sic] meets New Found Glory and you won’t be far off getting what makes You Me At Six tick. ‘Gossip’ and opener ‘The Truth Is A Terrible Thing’ all echo the aforementioned bands, however there is a rough edge that separates You Me At Six from their glossy luminaries." They praised the simple production on the record which retained their distinctly British sound, and concluded, "A happy medium has been reached with an Americanized sound that retains some of the bands gritty origins." Evan Lucy of Alternative Press also gave the album a mixed review, commenting that "some songs feel ripped from Fall Out Boy's Take This to Your Grave," but praised songs which were less adherent to pop punk, namely "Tigers and Sharks" and "Always Attract".

Thrash Hits reviewer Mischa Pearlman heavily criticised the album, calling the music on the record "a series of badly phrased platitudes set to irritating tunes", and attacking the band as "most definitely a product of their times [...] You Me At Six are the perfect poster boys for their so-called scene." AllMusic reviewer Jon O'Brien also criticised the album's sound, describing it as an album which was more mature than a Busted record, but not as heavy as Fightstar's music. O'Brien stated that the band followed a "well-worn formula" of emo pop on Take Off Your Colours. However, another AllMusic reviewer, Jason Birchmeier, later regarded Take Off Your Colours as an "impressive debut album" which cemented the group "as one of England's hottest up-and-coming rock bands".

=== Commercial performance and legacy ===
The album peaked on the UK Albums Chart at number 25, and the deluxe edition re-entered the chart, peaking at number 61. While "If I Were In Your Shoes" and "Gossip" failed to chart, "Jealous Minds Think Alike" peaked at number 100 and "Save It For the Bedroom" peaked at number 146. While promoting the deluxe version of the album, "Finders Keepers" and "Kiss and Tell" reached number 33 and 42, respectively. In March 2012, the album was certified silver in the UK, and four months later, it was certified gold. Rock Sound ranked it at number 36 on their list of the year's best albums. One of the magazine's writers, Rob Sayce, said the album's "unprecedented success helped open doors for other rising bands" in the UK, such as Deaf Havana and Young Guns. Valerie Magan of The Line of Best Fit wrote that the album pushed the band to the "helm of a new wave of pop-punk that transcended continents, and solidified the band into a household name for alt-rockers everywhere".

== Track listing ==
All songs written and arranged by You Me at Six.

| No. | Title | Length |
|---|---|---|
| 1. | "The Truth Is a Terrible Thing" | 2:51 |
| 2. | "Gossip" | 2:57 |
| 3. | "Call That a Comeback" | 3:26 |
| 4. | "Jealous Minds Think Alike" | 3:36 |
| 5. | "Save It for the Bedroom" | 3:58 |
| 6. | "Take Off Your Colours" | 3:16 |
| 7. | "You've Made Your Bed (So Sleep in It)" | 4:19 |
| 8. | "If You Run" | 3:57 |
| 9. | "Tigers and Sharks" | 4:27 |
| 10. | "If I Were in Your Shoes" | 3:00 |
| 11. | "Always Attract" | 6:05 |
| 12. | "Nasty Habits" | 3:51 |
| 13. | "The Rumour" | 5:15 |
| Total length: | | 50:58 |

US edition
| No. | Title | Length |
|---|---|---|
| 1. | "The Truth Is a Terrible Thing" | 2:51 |
| 2. | "Gossip" | 2:57 |
| 3. | "Finders Keepers" | 3:13 |
| 4. | "Call That a Comeback" | 3:26 |
| 5. | "Jealous Minds Think Alike" | 3:36 |
| 6. | "Save It for the Bedroom" | 3:58 |
| 7. | "Take Off Your Colours" | 3:16 |
| 8. | "You've Made Your Bed (So Sleep in It)" | 4:19 |
| 9. | "If You Run" | 3:57 |
| 10. | "Tigers and Sharks" | 4:27 |
| 11. | "If I Were in Your Shoes" | 3:00 |
| 12. | "Always Attract" | 6:05 |
| 13. | "Nasty Habits" | 3:51 |
| 14. | "The Rumour" | 5:15 |
| 15. | "Sweet Feet" | 3:35 |
| 16. | "All Your Fault" | 4:26 |
| 17. | "Blue Eyes Don't Lie" | 3:30 |
| 18. | "Save It for the Bedroom" (acoustic) | 4:05 |
| 19. | "Finders Keepers" (acoustic) | 3:16 |
| 20. | "Kiss and Tell" | 3:21 |
| Total length: | | 76:24 |

UK limited edition bonus CD
| No. | Title | Length |
|---|---|---|
| 1. | "Kiss and Tell" | 3:19 |
| 2. | "Finders Keepers" | 3:13 |
| 3. | "Sweet Feet" | 3:35 |
| 4. | "All Your Fault" | 4:26 |
| 5. | "Blue Eyes Don't Lie" | 3:30 |
| Total length: | | 69:01 |

== Personnel ==
Personnel per booklet.

You Me at Six

- Josh Franceschi – lead vocals
- Chris Miller – guitar
- Max Helyer – guitar
- Matt Barnes – bass guitar
- Dan Flint – drums, percussion

Additional musicians

- Elissa Franceschi – guest vocals on "Always Attract"

Production

- Matt O'Grady – producer
- John Mitchell – co-producer, mixing
- Tim Turan – mastering
- Tom Barnes – photography
- John Latham – artwork, design
- Ben Ray – A&R
- Alistair Tant – A&R

== Chart positions ==
=== Peak positions ===
Original release

| Chart (2008) | Peak position |
|---|---|
| UK Albums Chart | 25 |

Reissue

| Chart (2009) | Peak position |
|---|---|
| UK Albums Chart | 61 |

== Certifications ==
| Region | Certification | Certified units/sales |
|---|---|---|
| United Kingdom (BPI) | Gold | 100,000^{^} |
^{^} Shipments figures based on certification alone.
