= Gallery Circus =

- Origin: Tyne and Wear, England
- Genres: Indie
- Years active: 2010-present
- Members: Daniel Ross; Graeme Ross
- Website: gallerycircus.co.uk

Gallery Circus are an English rock duo composed of twin brothers Daniel and Graeme Ross from Boldon, Tyne and Wear. They are described as having an intense blues rock sound with a live set that oozes power, intensity and raw passion.

== Career ==
In 2010, the brothers relocated to Wicker Park, Chicago, United States, to write music together and create a musical buzz in the city. Playing shows on rooftops, in illegal makeshift venues and on public landmarks helped the Ross brothers become part of a new emerging rock scene in the iconic city.

Having returned to Newcastle upon Tyne, on 20 January 2014 the band self released their debut single "Supercell". The track was selected as BBC Introducing track of the week for the week commencing 7 July 2014 and received praise from BBC Radio 1 DJs Huw Stephens, Annie Mac and Greg James, all of whom played the song on their respective shows. The brothers were asked to play the BBC Introducing Stage at Glastonbury Festival in June 2014 and their performance was selected for the BBC's 'Best of Sunday' Highlights.

In October and November 2014, Gallery Circus toured the UK with Little Comets and Kill it kid. In February 2015 the brothers supported King Charles on his UK tour and Hanni El Khatib on his European tour in March 2015. They released their second single "Hollywood Drip" on 3 March 2015.

== Discography ==
=== Singles ===
Year	Title	UK Chart position
2014	"Supercell": Released 20 January 2014	
2015	"Hollywood Drip": Released 3 March 2015	

== Members ==
Current members

- Daniel Ross – lead vocals, guitar, bass, piano (2010–present)
- Graeme Ross – drums, backing vocals (2010–present)
