= Finders Keepers (You Me at Six song) =

Single by You Me at Six

from the album Take Off Your Colours
- Released: 25 May 2009
- Genre: Pop punk
- Length: 3:11
- Songwriter(s): Matt Barnes, Dan Flint, Josh Franceschi, Max Helyer, Chris Miller

You Me at Six singles chronology
"Save It for the Bedroom" (2008)	"Finders Keepers" (2009)	"Kiss and Tell" (2009)

Finders Keepers is a song by You Me At Six which was released as a single on 25 May 2009. The song was released on their Myspace account on 8 April. A music video was released for the song on 22 April 2009. It was later featured on the deluxe edition of their Take Off Your Colours album along with their next single, "Kiss and Tell", and three B-sides. The song reached #1 in the Kerrang Rock Top 40, and peaked at #33 on the UK Singles Chart on the 31 May 2009. This was their first and only entry to date in the Top 40 Singles Chart until "Rescue Me" in 2011.

In October, the band supported Fall Out Boy for three dates. While rehearsing, the band thought of adding a section of "Sugar, We're Goin Down" during one of their songs. The band's management heard the song and proceeded to suggest the band covering it, to which they agreed.

== Track listing ==
1. "Finders Keepers"
2. "Sugar, We're Goin Down" (Fall Out Boy cover)
