= Underdog (You Me at Six song) =

Single by You Me at Six

from the album Hold Me Down
- Released: 8 February 2010 (Digital); 9 February 2010 (Physical)
- Recorded: 2009
- Genre: Pop punk
- Length: 2:23
- Label: Virgin
- Songwriter(s): Sam Moss
- Producer(s): Matt O'Grady, John Mitchell

You Me at Six singles chronology
"Kiss and Tell" (2009)	"Underdog" (2010)	"Liquid Confidence (Nothing to Lose)" (2010)

"Underdog" is the second single by English rock band You Me at Six written by Sam Moss, to be released from their second album: Hold Me Down. "Underdog" was released on 8 February 2010 and charted at a peak of #49 on the UK Singles Chart, marking the band's sixth most successful single to date. The single was added to BBC Radio 1's A Playlist during January 2010.

== Music video ==
The music video for Underdog was shot at Brixton Academy in December 2009 and was directed by Nick Bartlett.

The music video is a mix of performance shots and a storyline where a ballerina is cheated on by her boyfriend with someone else. The ballerina then performs a routine. When she returns she kisses her boyfriend in front of the one he cheated with, who leaves. The ballerina then walks away, leaving him with no girl.

== Track listing ==
No.	Title	Length
1.	"Underdog"	2:25
2.	"Underdog (acoustic)"	2:34
3.	"Fact-Tastic"	2:47

== Charts ==
"Underdog" debuted on the UK Singles Chart at number 49 on 14 February 2010, marking the band's third most successful single behind "Finders Keepers" and "Kiss And Tell" which peaked at number 33 and 42 in May and September 2009 respectively. "Underdog" also marks the bands' fifth Top 10 single to date. On its second week in the chart, the single fell 41 places to number 90, before falling out the following week.

Chart (2010)	Peak Position
UK Singles (OCC)	49

== Certifications ==
Region	Certification	Certified units/sales
United Kingdom (BPI)	Gold	400,000^{‡}
^{‡} Sales+streaming figures based on certification alone.

== In popular culture ==
The song is featured in the soundtrack of Horrid Henry: The Movie, released in 2011, and was also used briefly in the movie when Henry traps Moody Margaret with a water balloon and his yo-yo.
