= Bite My Tongue =

Single by You Me at Six featuring Oliver Sykes

from the album Sinners Never Sleep
- Released: 4 December 2011
- Recorded: 2011
- Studio: Sunset Sound, The Sound Factory; EastWest Studios, Los Angeles, California
- Genre: Alternative rock; post-hardcore
- Length: 3:42
- Label: Virgin; Polydor
- Songwriter: Josh Franceschi
- Producer: Garth Richardson

You Me at Six singles chronology
"Loverboy" (2011)	"Bite My Tongue" (2011)	"The Swarm" (2012)

"Bite My Tongue" is the second single from You Me at Six's third studio album Sinners Never Sleep, released on 4 December 2011 as a digital download in the United Kingdom. The single reached number 124 on the UK Singles Chart and number 10 on the UK Rock & Metal Singles Chart. The song features guest vocals from Oliver Sykes of Bring Me the Horizon.

== Music video ==
A music video to accompany the release of "Bite My Tongue" was first released onto YouTube on 6 November 2011 with a total length of three minutes and forty-five seconds.

== Track listing ==
Digital download
No.	Title	Length
1.	"Bite My Tongue" (featuring Oliver Sykes)	3:42
2.	"Brother"	3:17
3.	"Foo Fighters [medley]" (Foo Fighters covers ("Bridge Burning", "All My Life", "Best of You"))	6:24

== Promotional CD ==
CD
No.	Title	Length
1.	"Bite My Tongue [clean]" (featuring Oliver Sykes)	3:42
2.	"Bite My Tongue [explicit]" (featuring Oliver Sykes)	3:42
3.	"Bite My Tongue [instrumental]"	3:55

== Charts ==
Chart (2011)	Peak position
UK Singles (OCC)	124
UK Rock & Metal (OCC)	10

== Certifications ==
Region	Certification	Certified units/sales
United Kingdom (BPI)	Silver	200,000^{‡}
^{‡} Sales+streaming figures based on certification alone.

== Release history ==
Region	Date	Format	Label
United Kingdom	4 December 2011	CD; digital download	Virgin; Polydor
