= You Me at Six =

English rock band

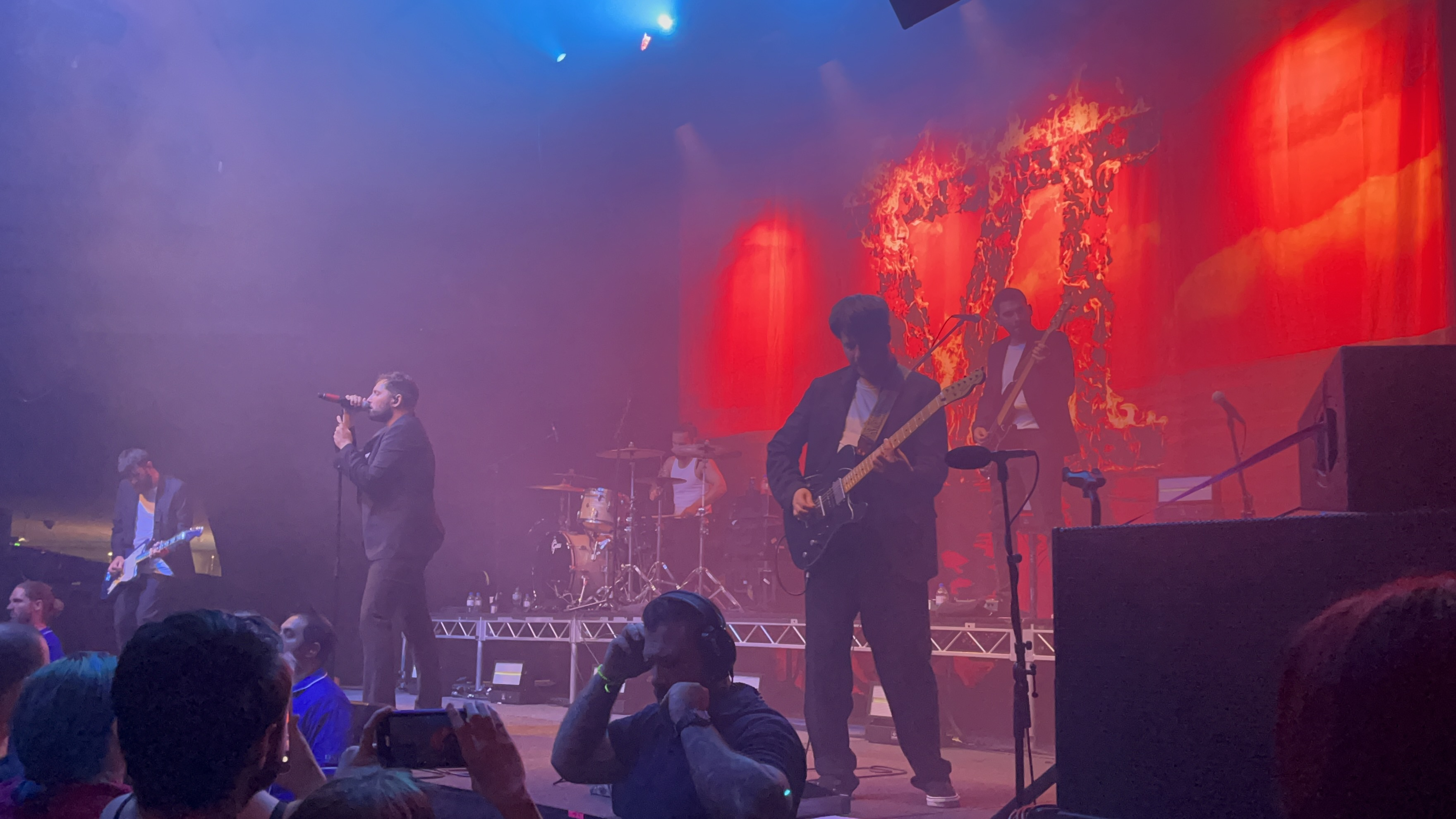
- You Me at Six performing in Sydney, Australia in July 2023.

Background information
- Origin: Weybridge, Surrey, England
- Genres: Pop-punk; alternative rock; pop rock; post-hardcore
- Years active: 2004–2025
- Labels: Slam Dunk; Virgin; BMG; Infectious; Underdog; AWAL; Rise
- Past members: Joe Phillips; Matt Barnes; Josh Franceschi; Max Helyer; Chris Miller; Dan Flint

You Me at Six were an English rock band from Weybridge, Surrey. The band consisted of lead singer Josh Franceschi, guitarists Max Helyer and Chris Miller, bassist Matt Barnes and drummer Daniel Flint. Formed in 2004, the name for the group originated as an abbreviation for the group making Friday night plans after a concert. The band released eight studio albums and one live album.

The group achieved initial success in 2008 with the release of their debut album, Take Off Your Colours, which included the singles "Save It for the Bedroom", "Finders Keepers" and "Kiss and Tell", with the latter two peaking at number 33 and number 42 respectively in the UK Singles Chart. Their second album, Hold Me Down (2010), debuted at number five in the UK, while their third album, Sinners Never Sleep (2011), peaked at number 3, was certified Gold, and spawned the band's fifth top-50 single "Loverboy". Their fourth album, Cavalier Youth (2014), debuted at number one and featured the singles "Lived a Lie" and "Room to Breathe". Their fifth album, Night People, released to mixed reviews in 2017. Their next album, VI, was released in 2018, followed by their seventh studio album, Suckapunch, which gave the band their second number-one album in March 2021. In 2023, their eighth album, Truth Decay, was released.

You Me at Six toured extensively, with appearances on Warped Tour, Soundwave, and has toured with Thirty Seconds to Mars, Paramore, Fall Out Boy, All Time Low and Bring Me the Horizon, among others. You Me at Six won the award for Best British Band at the Kerrang! Awards in 2011. The band's influences include American rock bands Blink-182, Incubus, Thrice and British rock band Arctic Monkeys. In February 2024, the band announced on social media that they would be splitting up after their 2025 tour.

== History ==
=== We Know What It Means to Be Alone EP (2004–2007) ===
You Me at Six formed in Weybridge, Surrey in 2004. The band's line-up consisted of vocalist Josh Franceschi, guitarists Max Helyer and Chris Miller, bassist Matt Barnes, and drummer Joe Phillips. The group released an EP, We Know What It Means to Be Alone in 2006, after which, Phillips left the band. He was replaced by Dan Flint, who the band had gone to college with, following the band's appearance at Slam Dunk Festival 2007. Flint was initially asked to fill in on drums for a tour, before being asked to join the band.

=== Take Off Your Colours (2007–2008) ===
The band released another EP later in 2007. During summer 2007, the owner of Drive-Thru, Richard Reines, had arranged a meeting with the band. The band were ecstatic about the prospect and proceeded to wait in London for three hours, only for Reines to fail to show up.

Their debut album, Take Off Your Colours, came out in October 2008 on Slam Dunk Records. Six singles were released from the album: "Save It for the Bedroom", "If I Were in Your Shoes", "Gossip", "Jealous Minds Think Alike", "Finders Keepers" and "Kiss and Tell". Take off Your Colours was re-released as a "deluxe" version, with added tracks, and the band supported Fall Out Boy in late 2008. They were nominated for "Best British Band" at the 2008 and 2009 Kerrang! Awards, but lost both times to Bullet for My Valentine.

=== Hold Me Down (2009–2010) ===
The band released second album, Hold Me Down, on Virgin Records in January 2010. The album was preceded by a free digital download of song "The Consequence". Recorded at Outhouse Studios in Reading, produced and engineered by Matt O'Grady and mixed by John Mitchell, Hold Me Down, debuted at No. 5 in the UK album charts. They have completed their third sell-out headline tour in support of their second album, Hold Me Down. They were joined by Sean Smith and Elissa Franceschi on selected dates. In Belfast, Matt told GiggingNI.com how it was "exciting to see how much you've grown from a year and a half ago". Follow-up singles, the Underdog EP and "Stay With Me", were also released. You Me at Six again lost out to Bullet for My Valentine in the "Best British Band" category at the 2010 Kerrang! Awards and collaborated with American rap duo Chiddy Bang on a track titled "Rescue Me" that was released in February 2011.

On 18 May 2010, You Me at Six visited BBC Radio One's Live Lounge for the second time, presented by Fearne Cotton. Aside from being interviewed they played a version of "Liquid Confidence" and a cover of Ellie Goulding's "Starry Eyed" at Maida Vale, in London live on air. You Me at Six kicked off their year playing a launch show in Kingston – originally intended to be an instore gig at Banquet Records, it was quickly upgraded to the new Hippodrome – in support of their new album Hold Me Down on 11 January. They played 3 dates, including, also, an HMV instore and an HMV event headline promoting new British music at the Relentless Garage London. They announced that they would be playing several festivals including Punkspring in Japan, the whole Vans Warped Tour; and supported Paramore on all Soundwave dates, as well as on Paramore's tour.

=== Sinners Never Sleep (2011–2014) ===
You Me at Six recorded a third album, Sinners Never Sleep, at The Sound Factory studio in Los Angeles, California. The record was released in October 2011, and peaked at No. 3 in the UK Album Charts. A single, "Bite My Tongue", featuring Oliver Sykes was released two months later, and the group finally won the "Best British Band" award at the Kerrang! Awards. A further single, "No One Does It Better", was released in 2012, as was a song specially recorded for The Swarm, a ride at Thorpe Park. On 16 April 2011, Blink-182 announced that their headlining tour would be delayed till 2012 due to the fact that they have not finished recording for the new album yet. As a result, You Me at Six will not be touring with them. Upcoming tour dates for the UK in September will be released on 15 June, and the band have announced that they will be touring Australia with We the Kings in late August–early September. On 29 August 2011, the fourth track of the Sinners Never Sleep, "This Is the First Thing" was leaked online by one of the inside recording team member back in Los Angeles while the band was tracking their vocals. On 1 September 2011, a 30-second snippet of the track from the record "Bite My Tongue" featuring Oli Sykes was leaked on the internet as well. It was removed 30 minutes later due to infringement and copyrighted issues. The band's next UK tours started in March 2012. The first two tour dates, which were supposed to be played in Belfast and Dublin were postponed due to Josh Franceschi contracting tonsillitis and being unable to perform. You Me at Six played the entire Warped Tour 2012.

"The Swarm" was released as a non-album single for the launch of the roller coaster of the same name; it peaked at number 23.

On 8 December 2012, You Me at Six played their largest head line show to date, the Final Night of Sin selling out the Wembley Arena. The live concert' was recorded and released on CD and DVD through Virgin Records.

=== Cavalier Youth (2014–2017) ===
Following their headline show at Wembley arena in December, the band parted ways with their record label Virgin Records. In February 2013, they began working on their fourth album, Cavalier Youth. They spent five weeks doing pre-production at The Doghouse Studio in Henley-on-Thames. The following month, the group were writing their new album at The Boathouse in Henley-on-Thames, which was owned by a friend of theirs. They wrote a portion of the album here over two–three weeks.

In 2013 the band returned to Los Angeles to record with producer Neal Avron. The resulting album, Cavalier Youth, was released in January 2014, with single Lived A Lie trailing the full-length in September 2013. Cavalier Youth was the band's first number one album, selling over 32,000 copies and debuting at number one on the UK album chart. You Me at Six also released a documentary about their album making process, titled Oceans Away.

You Me at Six toured extensively, including a co-head-lining tour of the UK with American rock band All Time Low, with the tour announced after Alex Gaskarth joined the band on stage during their performance at their Reading concert as a part of the 2012 Reading and Leeds festival.

=== Night People (2017–2018) ===
Their fifth album, Night People was released on 13 January 2017. The single Take on the World was used in the Vampire Diaries series finale.

=== VI (2018–2020) ===
Within a week of Night People releasing, You Me at Six had no management and found themselves stuck in private legal battles. Despite initial enthusiasm for the album and its success, by August 2017 the band has expressed disdain for the album. Following on from these mixed reviews for Night People, You Me at Six released their sixth album, VI, on 5 October 2018 to much more positive reviews. The album debuted and peaked at number six on the UK album charts.

Following the 2019–20 Australian Bushfires, You Me at Six released a charity single Our House (The Mess We Made), raising money for the WIRES foundation. Franceschi described the single as a standalone song and the dance track doesn't reflect the sound that the band is heading in.

=== Suckapunch (2021–2022) ===
The band released their seventh studio album Suckapunch on 15 January 2021. Debuting at number one on the UK album charts, it was the band's second number one album. The album spawned the singles "Makemefeelalive", "Beautiful Way", "Suckapunch" and "Adrenaline".

=== Truth Decay, The Final Nights of Six, and break-up (2023–2025) ===
The band's eighth and final studio album, Truth Decay, was released on 10 February 2023.

On 18 August 2023, the band released their seventh EP, Live from Alexandra Palace.

On 31 January 2024, You Me at Six announced a farewell tour titled The Final Nights of Six, scheduled to begin in 2024 and conclude in 2025. The tour was organised in celebration of the band’s 20th anniversary and served as their final series of live performances prior to their disbandment in 2025.

== Musical style ==
You Me at Six's musical style has been described as pop-punk, alternative rock, pop rock, post-hardcore, emo pop, and screamo. Kerrang! categorized them as a "Myspace band" due to their popularity on Myspace early in their career, despite stylistic disimilarities with other bands the publication associated with the term, such as Suicide Silence and Job for a Cowboy.

== Band members ==
Final line-up

- Matt Barnes – bass guitar, backing vocals (2004–2025)
- Josh Franceschi – lead vocals (2004–2025)
- Max Helyer – rhythm guitar, backing vocals (2004–2025)
- Chris Miller – lead guitar (2004–2025)
- Dan Flint – drums, percussion, sampling (2007–2025)

Touring

- Luke Rendell – additional guitar, backing vocals (2008–2025)

Former

- Joe Phillips – drums, percussion (2004–2007)

== Discography ==
Studio albums

- Take Off Your Colours (2008)
- Hold Me Down (2010)
- Sinners Never Sleep (2011)
- Cavalier Youth (2014)
- Night People (2017)
- VI (2018)
- Suckapunch (2021)
- Truth Decay (2023)
