= The Swarm (song) =

Single by You Me at Six
- Released: 18 March 2012
- Recorded: 2011
- Genre: Alternative rock
- Length: 4:01
- Label: Virgin

You Me at Six singles chronology
"Bite My Tongue" (2011)	"The Swarm" (2012)	"No One Does It Better" (2012)

"The Swarm" is a single by British band You Me at Six. The single was released on 18 March 2012 as a digital download in the United Kingdom. The single peaked at number 23 on the UK Singles Chart and number 1 on the UK Rock Chart.

== Background ==
In March 2012, Thorpe Park announced they contacted You Me at Six to create the world's first roller coaster single for the launch of The Swarm. The song was released to iTunes on 18 March 2012, a few days after the opening of the coaster.

== Track listing ==
Digital download
No.	Title	Length
1.	"The Swarm"	4:01

== Chart performance ==
Chart (2012)	Peak position
UK Singles (OCC)	23

== Release history ==
Region	Date	Format	Label
United Kingdom	18 March 2012	Digital Download	Virgin Records
