= Josh Franceschi =

English singer-songwriter

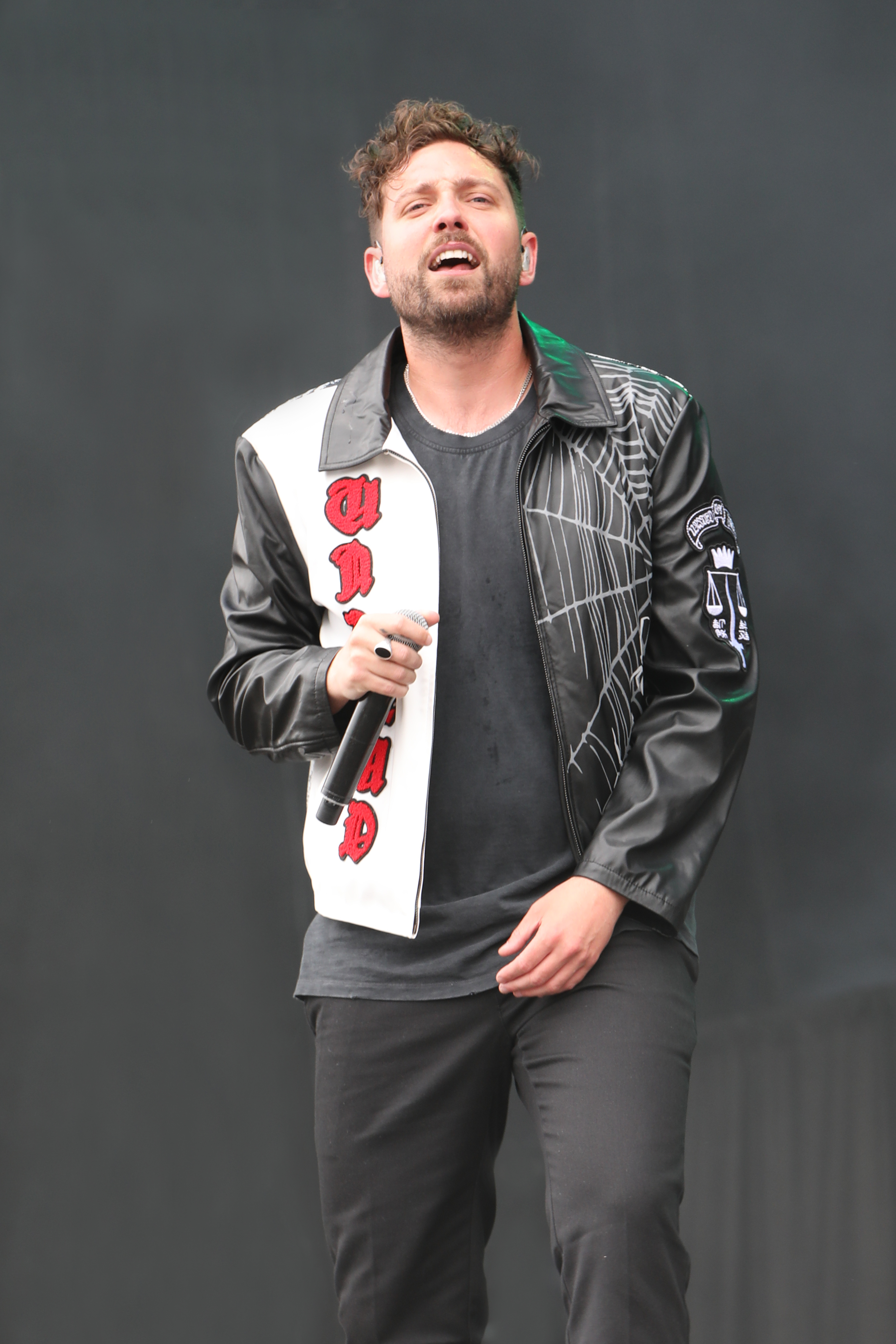
- Franceschi performing with You Me at Six at Rock im Park in 2022.

Background information
- Born: Joshua James Alphonse Franceschi; 7 August 1990 (age 35); Weybridge, Surrey, England
- Genres: Alternative rock; pop rock; pop punk; post-hardcore
- Occupations: Singer; songwriter
- Instruments: Vocals; piano; guitar
- Years active: 2004–present
- Website: youmeatsix.co.uk

Joshua James Alphonse Franceschi (born 7 August 1990) is an English singer and songwriter. He was the lead vocalist of rock band You Me at Six.

== Early life ==
Franceschi was born to parents Anne Franceschi and Christian Franceschi in Weybridge, Surrey. He is of Corsican-French (paternal) descent. He has one sister, Elissa Franceschi, who is also a vocalist. He lived in Cyprus in his early childhood, but later moved to Twickenham to live with his grandmother. At the age of 9, he moved back to Weybridge. He attended Heathside School until he was 16, and then moved to Godalming College before dropping out to attend Esher College, where he studied A-Levels in politics, history and film studies. He currently lives in Brighton.

== Public image ==
=== Ticket touts ===
In 2016, Franceschi criticised the reselling of tickets for extortionate prices, claiming there are consequences for both musicians and fans. He joined other musicians and industry figures under the Fanfair Alliance to combat ticket touting. Franceschi spoke against the rising issue along with Ian McAndrew and Annabella Coldrick in Parliament. Many MPs backed the argument, agreeing the importance of addressing the issue.

=== Personal life ===
Franceschi is vegan. The band organised a pop-up vegan kebab shop following the release of their album VI. He is an Arsenal fan. In 2021, Franceschi tweeted that he is the cousin of McFly bassist, Dougie Poynter.

== Discography ==
=== Guest appearances ===
- "Salt" (with Elissa Franceschi)
- "This is Why We Can't Have Nice Things (I Don't Care)" (with The Blackout)
- "Fuck" (with Bring Me the Horizon)
- "A Decade Drifting" (with Your Demise)
- "Not Alone" (with Kid Arkade)
- "24" (with Hellions)
- "Outlines" (with All Time Low on Straight to DVD II: Past, Present and Future Hearts)
- "Lose My Mind" (with James Arthur)
- "Hallucinate" (with Yours Truly)
- "Air Hostess" (with Busted)
