= Live at the Heineken Music Hall =

Live album by Caro Emerald with The Grandmono Orchestra
- Released: May 2011
- Recorded: December 2010
- Genre: Pop, jazz
- Label: Grandmono
- Producer: David Schreurs, Jan van Wieringen

Caro Emerald albums chronology
Deleted Scenes from the Cutting Room Floor (2010)	Live at the Heineken Music Hall (2011)	The Shocking Miss Emerald (2013)

Live at the Heineken Music Hall is the debut live album by Dutch singer Caro Emerald with The Grandmono Orchestra. The album was recorded in December 2010 and released in May 2011.

== Background ==
In December 2010 Emerald with a 16-piece Orchestra including strings, horns and percussion played three sold out shows at the Heineken Music Hall in Amsterdam, Netherlands.

== Track listing ==
CD/DVD

1. "Intro Greg Shapiro"
2. "Zoot Suit Theme"
3. "Absolutely Me"
4. "Just One Dance"
5. "You Don't Love Me"
6. "Muchos Besos"
7. "Back It Up"
8. "The Other Woman"
9. "Close to Me"
10. "Riviera Life"
11. "Dr. Wanna Do"
12. "Caro's Lament"
13. "I Know That He's Mine"
14. "The Lipstick On His Collar"
15. "Bad Romance"
16. "That Man"
17. "A Night like This"
18. "Two Hearts"
19. "Stuck"

== Charts ==
Chart (2011–12)	Peak position
Dutch Albums Chart	51
Dutch DVD Chart	1
