= List of UK Independent Albums Chart number ones of 2013 =

These are the Official Charts Company's UK Indie Chart number-one albums of 2013.

== Chart history ==
Key
†	Best-selling indie album of the year

Issue date	Album	Artist(s)	Record label	Ref.
6 January	Coexist	The xx	Young Turks	
13 January	An Awesome Wave	Alt-J	Infectious	
20 January	An Awesome Wave	Alt-J	Infectious	
27 January	Oui Oui Si Si Ja Ja Da Da	Madness	Cooking Vinyl	
3 February	An Awesome Wave	Alt-J	Infectious	
10 February	An Awesome Wave	Alt-J	Infectious	
17 February	The Best of Eva Cassidy	Eva Cassidy	Blix Street Records	
24 February	Electric	Richard Thompson	Proper Records	
3 March	Push the Sky Away	Nick Cave and the Bad Seeds	Bad Seed LTD	
10 March	Amok	Atoms for Peace	XL	
17 March	Graffiti on the Train	Stereophonics	Ignition	
24 March	Graffiti on the Train	Stereophonics	Ignition	
31 March	Graffiti on the Train	Stereophonics	Ignition	
7 April	Comedown Machine	The Strokes	RCA	
14 April	Graffiti on the Train	Stereophonics	Stylus Records	
21 April	English Electric	Orchestral Manoeuvres in the Dark	100% Records	
28 April	Deleted Scenes from the Cutting Room Floor	Caro Emerald	Grandmono	
5 May	Graffiti on the Train	Stereophonics	Stylus Records	
12 May	All the Little Lights	Passenger	Nettwerk	
19 May	The Shocking Miss Emerald	Caro Emerald	Grandmono	
26 May	Modern Vampires of the City	Vampire Weekend	XL	
2 June	Trouble Will Find Me	The National	4AD	
9 June	All the Little Lights	Passenger	Nettwerk	
16 June	...Like Clockwork	Queens of the Stone Age	Malador	
23 June	Tomorrow's Harvest	Boards of Canada	Warp	
30 June	All the Little Lights	Passenger	Nettwerk	
7 July	All the Little Lights	Passenger	Nettwerk	
14 July	The Weight of Your Love	Editors	PIAS	
21 July	All the Little Lights	Passenger	Nettwerk	
28 July	Electric	Pet Shop Boys	x2	
4 August	All the Little Lights	Passenger	Nettwerk	
11 August	All the Little Lights	Passenger	Nettwerk	
18 August	All the Little Lights	Passenger	Nettwerk	
25 August	All the Little Lights	Passenger	Nettwerk	
1 September	Where You Stand	Travis	Red Telephone Box	
8 September	Right Thoughts, Right Words, Right Action	Franz Ferdinand	Domino	
15 September	All the Little Lights	Passenger	Nettwerk	
22 September	AM †	Arctic Monkeys	Domino Records	
29 September	AM †	Arctic Monkeys	Domino Records	
6 October	AM †	Arctic Monkeys	Domino Records	
13 October	AM †	Arctic Monkeys	Domino Records	
20 October	AM †	Arctic Monkeys	Domino Records	
27 October	AM †	Arctic Monkeys	Domino Records	
3 November	AM †	Arctic Monkeys	Domino Records	
10 November	AM †	Arctic Monkeys	Domino Records	
17 November	A Picture of You	Daniel O'Donnell	Ritz	
24 November	AM †	Arctic Monkeys	Domino Records	
1 December	AM †	Arctic Monkeys	Domino Records	
8 December	AM †	Arctic Monkeys	Domino Records	
15 December	AM †	Arctic Monkeys	Domino Records	
22 December	AM †	Arctic Monkeys	Domino Records	
29 December	AM †	Arctic Monkeys	Domino Records	

== See also ==
- List of UK Albums Chart number ones of the 2010s
- List of UK Dance Albums Chart number ones of 2013
- List of UK Album Downloads Chart number ones of the 2010s
- List of UK Independent Singles Chart number ones of 2013
- List of UK R&B Albums Chart number ones of 2013
- List of UK Independent Singles Chart number ones of 2013
