= List of UK Country Albums Chart number ones of 2013 =

These are the Official Charts Company's UK Country Albums Chart number ones of 2013. The chart week runs from Friday to Thursday with the chart-date given as the following Thursday. Chart positions are based the multi-metric consumption of country music in the United Kingdom, blending traditional album sales, track equivalent albums, and streaming equivalent albums. The chart contains 20 positions.

In the iteration of the chart dated 6 January, Lady Antebellum's Need You Now held at number one, after returning to the top spot for the last four weeks of 2012. The album remained there for the first three weeks of 2013, being displaced by Glen Campbell's Ghost on the Canvas, before returning to the peak the following week and again on 7 April, spending its thirty ninth total week at number one. Campbell would also return to the top of the charts, spending three weeks there with See You There, for a total of four weeks at number one across both albums. The Mavericks also held the top spot for four weeks with their seventh studio album In Time, their fourth UK chart topper. Kacey Musgraves' debut album Same Trailer Different Park spent nine nonconsecutive weeks at number one following its release in March 2013. Lady Antebellum returned to the charts in May with the release of Golden, which held the top spot for nine consecutive weeks and then another four consecutive weeks, with these streaks being separated by Changed from Rascal Flatts. Other albums which spent multiple weeks at number one included Tim McGraw, whose Two Lanes of Freedom held the top spot for three weeks, Hoodoo from Tony Joe White, which spent four weeks at the summit, and Steve Earle's The Low Highway which peaked twice. Foreverly, a collaborative album between Billie Joe Armstrong and Norah Jones, debuted on 1 December, and remained at number one for the remaining four weeks of the year.

== Chart history ==
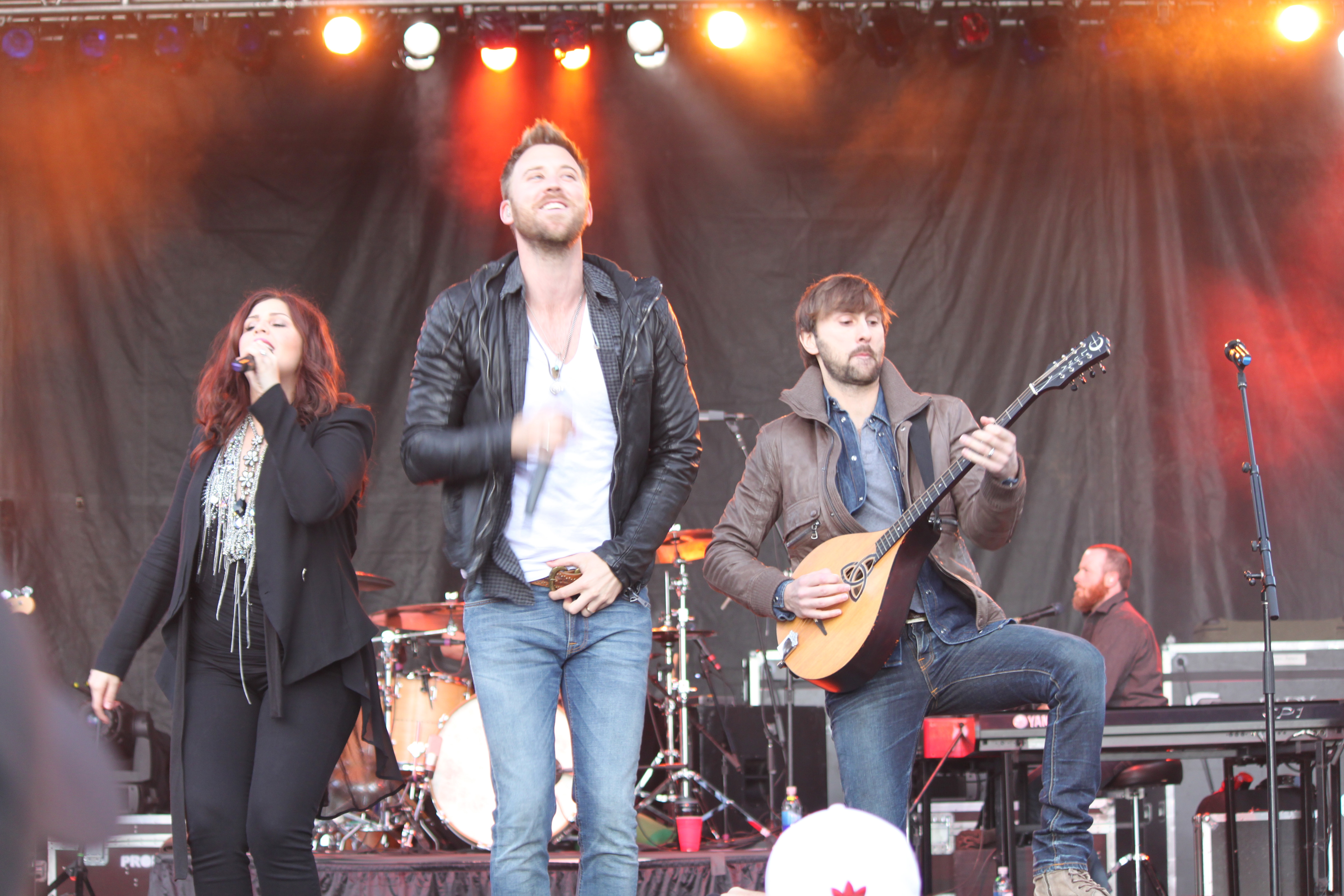
Lady Antebellum spent a leading eighteen weeks at number one with their two albums Need You Now and Golden.

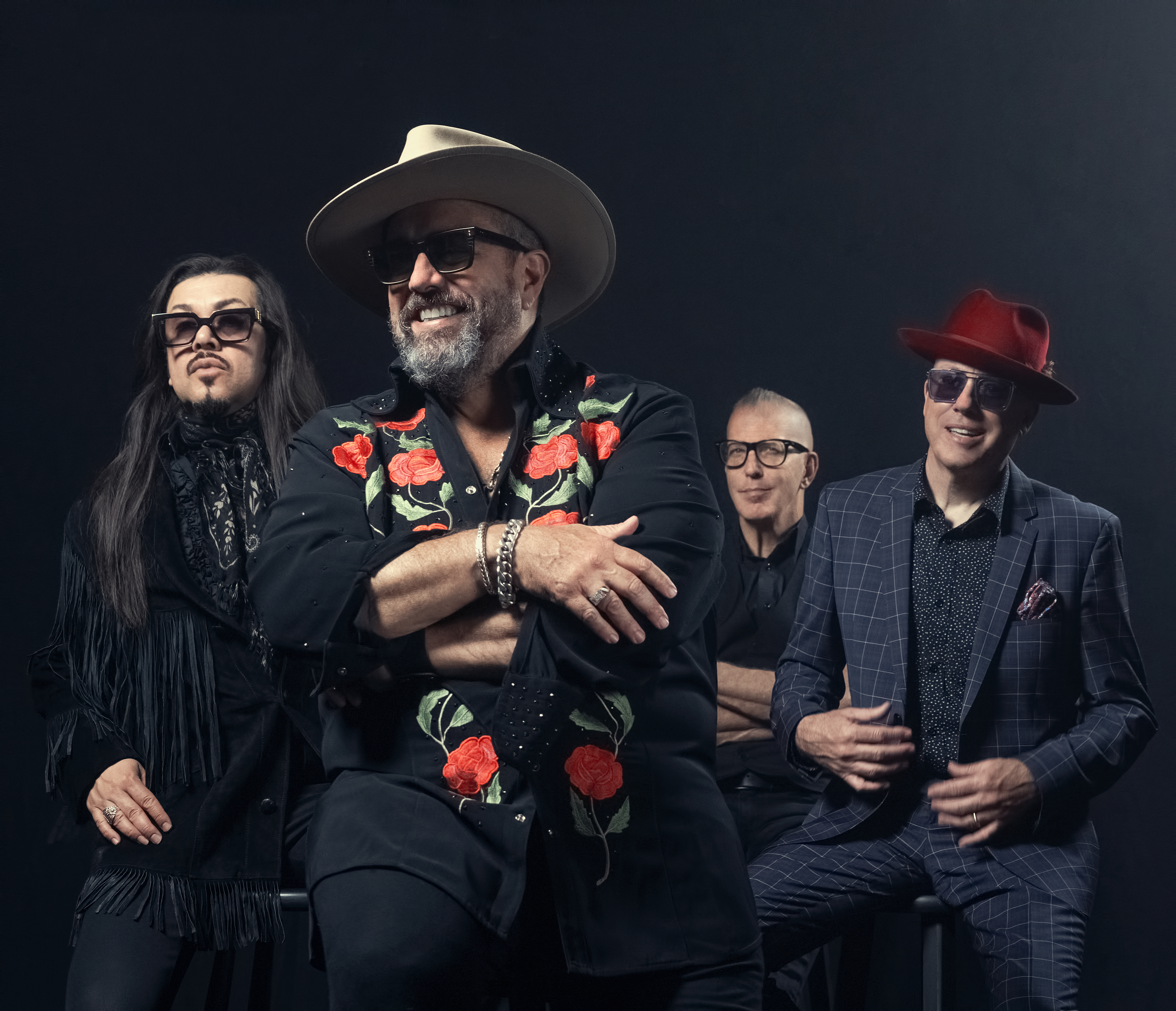
In Time became the fourth UK number one by The Mavericks, and spent four consecutive weeks at the chart peak.

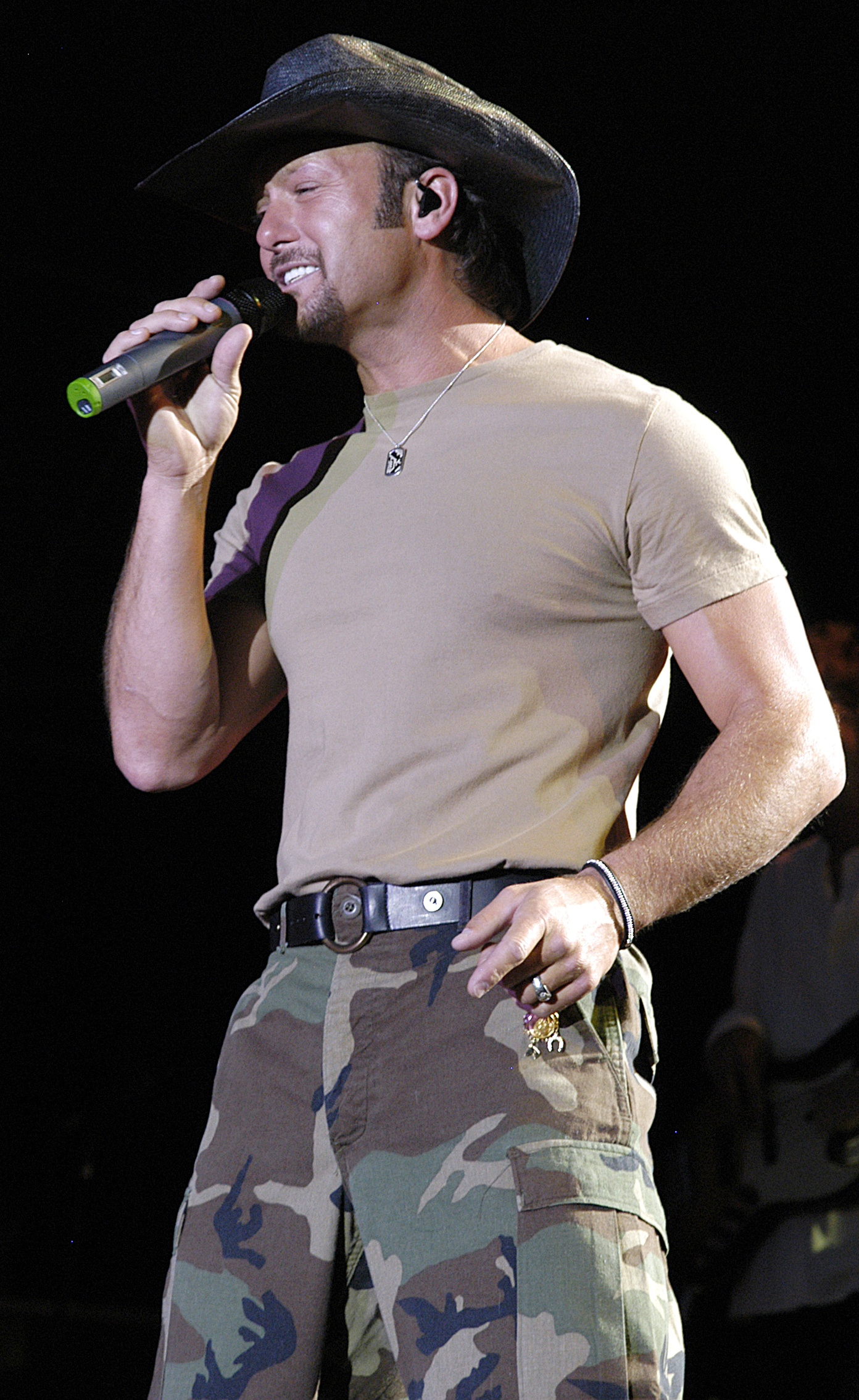
Two Lanes of Freedom by Tim McGraw held the top spot for three weeks, and became the veteran artist's first ever number one in the UK.

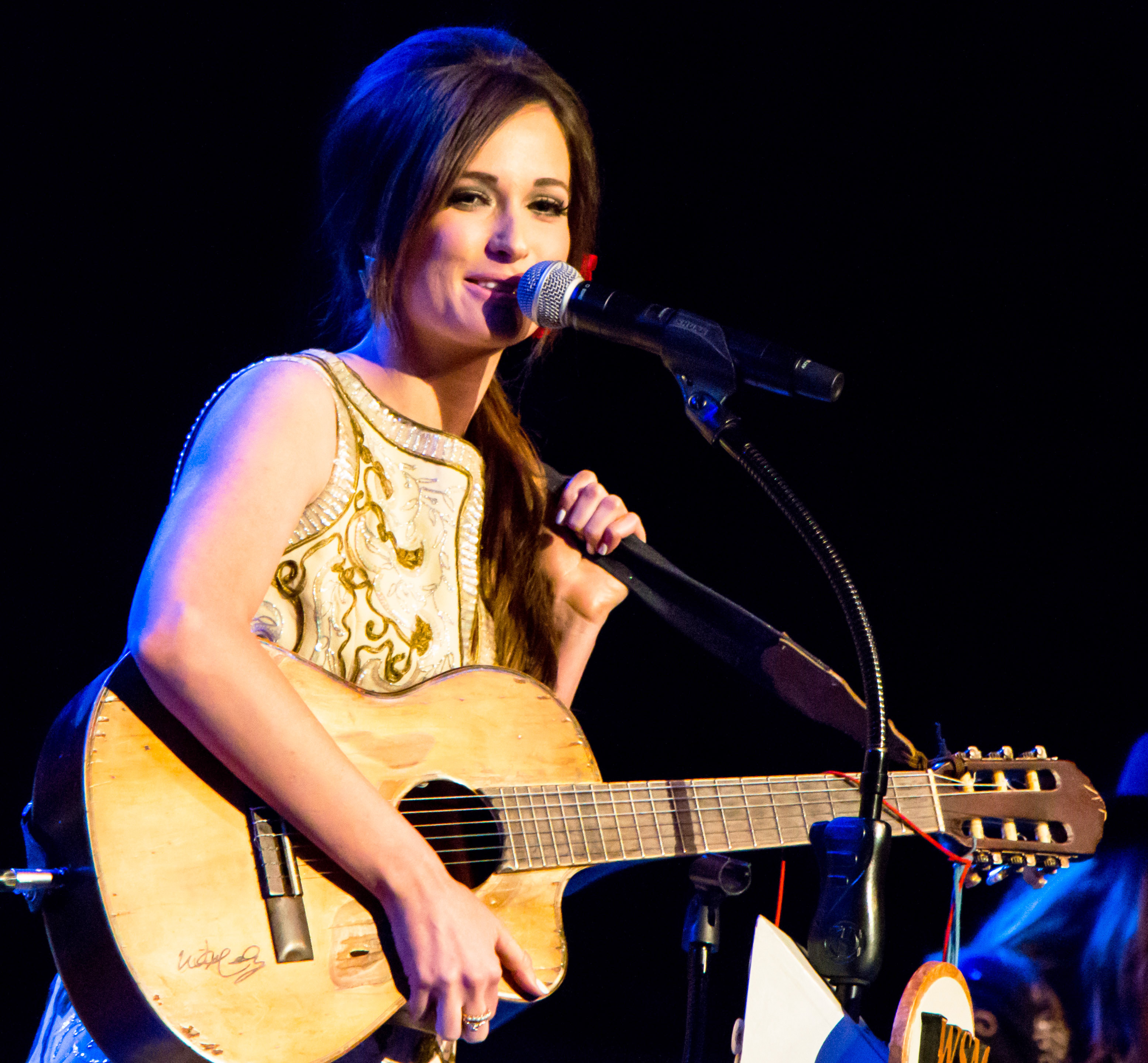
Kacey Musgraves spent nine total weeks at number one with her debut album Same Trailer Different Park.

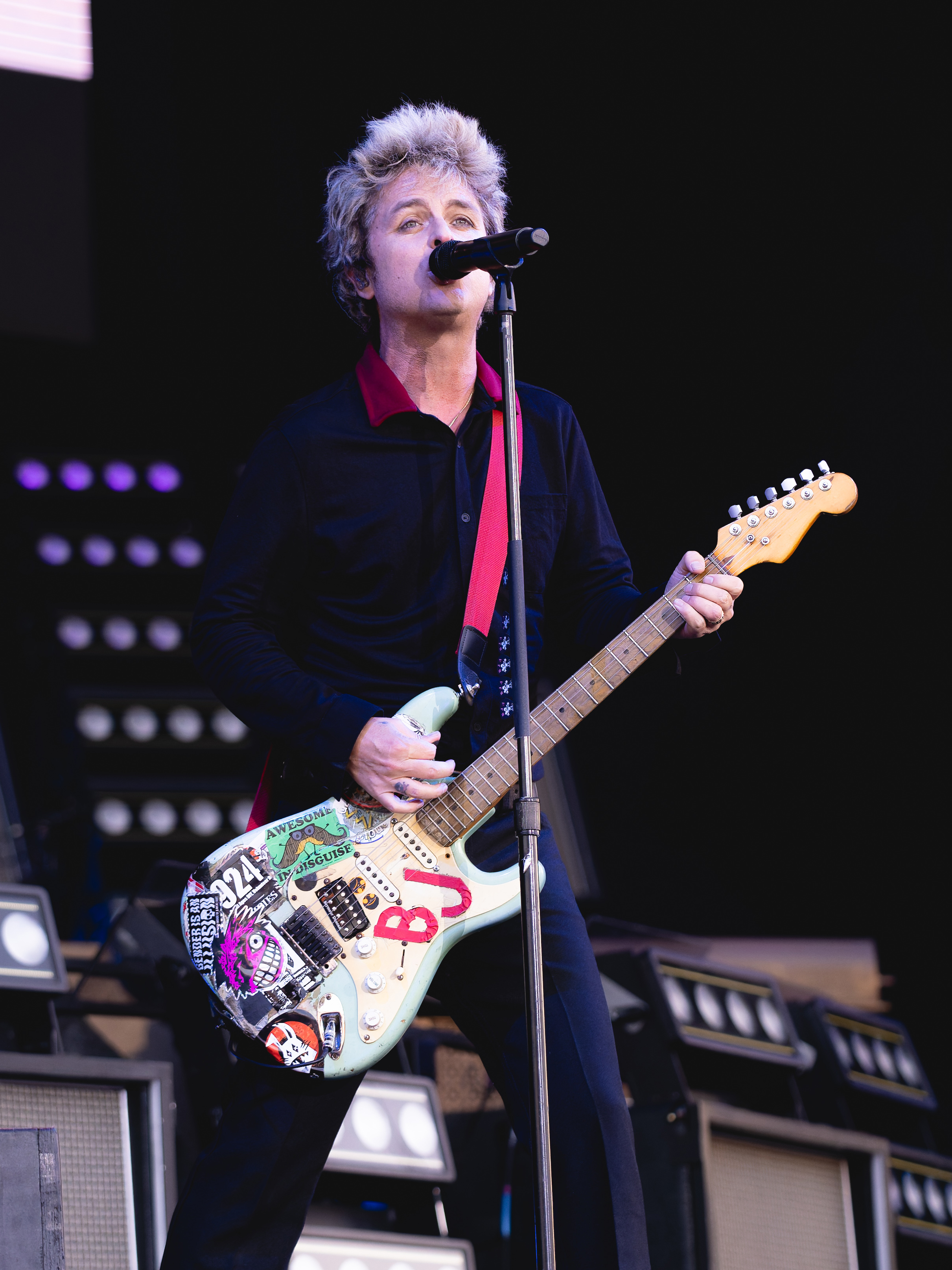
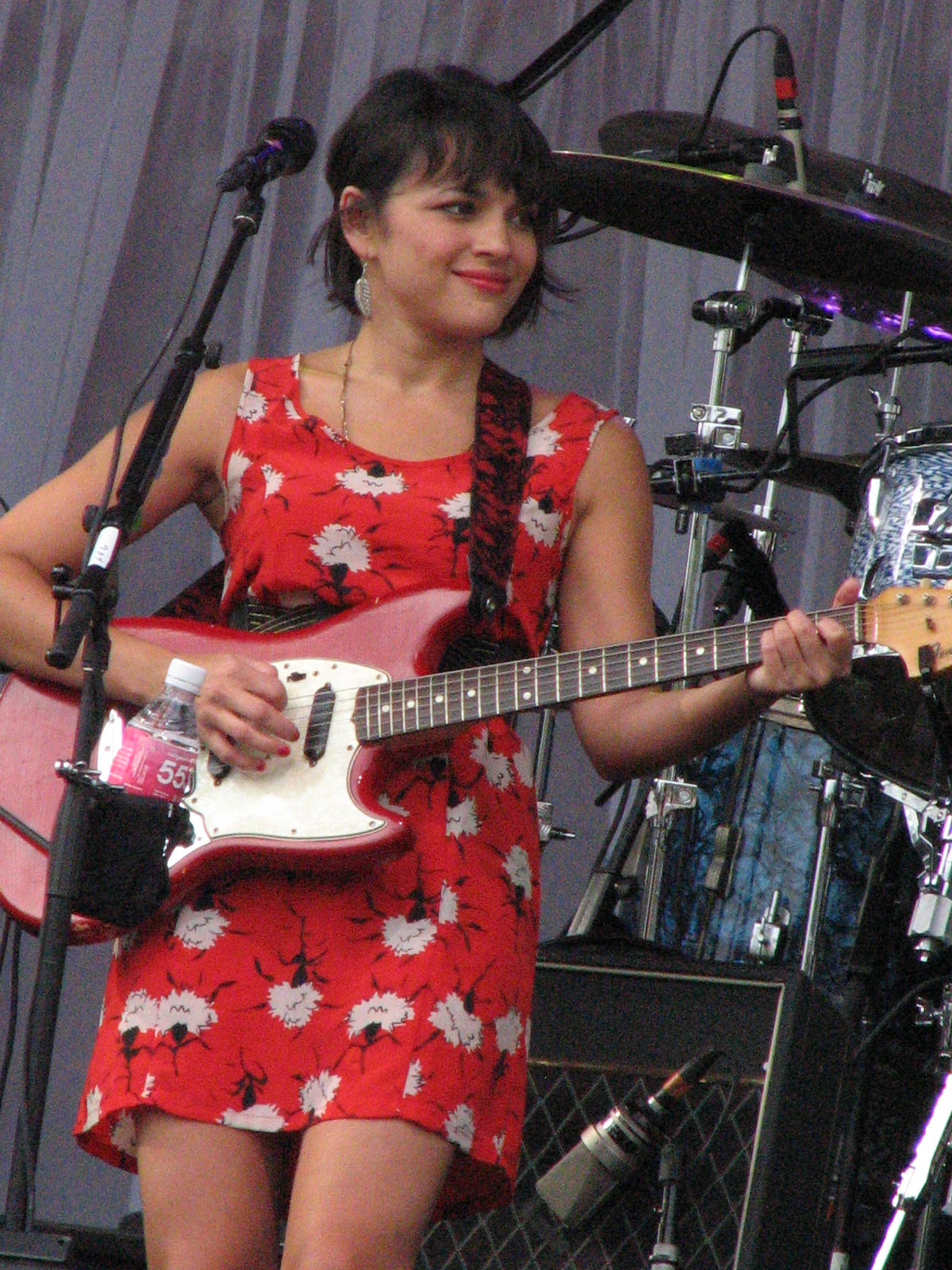
Billie Joe Armstrong and Norah Jones were number one for five consecutive weeks with their collaborative project Foreverly.

| Issue date | Album | Artist(s) | Record label | Ref. |
|---|---|---|---|---|
| 6 January | Need You Now | Lady Antebellum | Capitol | |
| 13 January | Need You Now | Lady Antebellum | Capitol | |
| 20 January | Need You Now | Lady Antebellum | Capitol | |
| 27 January | Ghost on the Canvas | Glen Campbell | Surfdog | |
| 3 February | Need You Now | Lady Antebellum | Capitol | |
| 10 February | In Time | The Mavericks | Valory | |
| 17 February | In Time | The Mavericks | Valory | |
| 24 February | In Time | The Mavericks | Valory | |
| 3 March | In Time | The Mavericks | Valory | |
| 10 March | Old Yellow Moon | Emmylou Harris and Rodney Crowell | Nonesuch | |
| 17 March | Two Lanes of Freedom | Tim McGraw | Big Machine | |
| 24 March | Two Lanes of Freedom | Tim McGraw | Big Machine | |
| 31 March | Two Lanes of Freedom | Tim McGraw | Big Machine | |
| 7 April | Need You Now | Lady Antebellum | Capitol | |
| 14 April | Wheelhouse | Brad Paisley | Arista Nashville | |
| 21 April | The Low Highway | Steve Earle | New West | |
| 28 April | Same Trailer Different Park | Kacey Musgraves | Decca | |
| 5 May | The Low Highway | Steve Earle | New West | |
| 12 May | Golden | Lady Antebellum | Decca | |
| 19 May | Golden | Lady Antebellum | Decca | |
| 26 May | Golden | Lady Antebellum | Decca | |
| 2 June | Golden | Lady Antebellum | Decca | |
| 9 June | Golden | Lady Antebellum | Decca | |
| 16 June | Golden | Lady Antebellum | Decca | |
| 23 June | Golden | Lady Antebellum | Decca | |
| 30 June | Golden | Lady Antebellum | Decca | |
| 7 July | Golden | Lady Antebellum | Decca | |
| 14 July | Changed | Rascal Flatts | Big Machine | |
| 21 July | Golden | Lady Antebellum | Decca | |
| 28 July | Golden | Lady Antebellum | Decca | |
| 14 August | Golden | Lady Antebellum | Decca | |
| 11 August | Golden | Lady Antebellum | Decca | |
| 18 August | See You There | Glen Campbell | Surfdog | |
| 25 August | See You There | Glen Campbell | Surfdog | |
| 1 September | See You There | Glen Campbell | Surfdog | |
| 8 September | Same Trailer Different Park | Kacey Musgraves | Decca | |
| 15 September | Same Trailer Different Park | Kacey Musgraves | Decca | |
| 22 September | Hoodoo | Tony Joe White | Yep Roc | |
| 29 September | Hoodoo | Tony Joe White | Yep Roc | |
| 6 October | Hoodoo | Tony Joe White | Yep Roc | |
| 13 October | Same Trailer Different Park | Kacey Musgraves | Decca | |
| 20 October | To All the Girls... | Willie Nelson | Sony | |
| 27 October | Same Trailer Different Park | Kacey Musgraves | Decca | |
| 3 November | Same Trailer Different Park | Kacey Musgraves | Decca | |
| 10 November | Same Trailer Different Park | Kacey Musgraves | Decca | |
| 17 November | Same Trailer Different Park | Kacey Musgraves | Decca | |
| 24 November | Same Trailer Different Park | Kacey Musgraves | Decca | |
| 1 December | Foreverly | Billie Joe Armstrong and Norah Jones | Warner Bros. | |
| 8 December | Foreverly | Billie Joe Armstrong and Norah Jones | Warner Bros. | |
| 15 December | Foreverly | Billie Joe Armstrong and Norah Jones | Warner Bros. | |
| 22 December | Foreverly | Billie Joe Armstrong and Norah Jones | Warner Bros. | |
| 29 December | Foreverly | Billie Joe Armstrong and Norah Jones | Warner Bros. | |

== Most weeks at number one ==
| Weeks at number one | Artist |
|---|---|
| 18 | Lady Antebellum |
| 9 | Kacey Musgraves |
| 5 | Billie Joe Armstrong and Norah Jones |
| 4 | Glen Campbell |
| 4 | The Mavericks |
| 3 | Tim McGraw |
| 3 | Tony Joe White |
| 2 | Steve Earle |

== See also ==
- List of UK Albums Chart number ones of 2013
- List of UK Dance Singles Chart number ones of 2013
- List of UK Album Downloads Chart number ones of 2013
- List of UK Independent Albums Chart number ones of 2013
- List of UK R&B Albums Chart number ones of 2013
- List of UK Rock & Metal Albums Chart number ones of 2013
- List of UK Compilation Chart number ones of the 2010s
