= Quicksand (disambiguation) =

Quicksand is loose, water-logged sand which yields easily to weight or pressure.

Quicksand or Quicksands may also refer to:

- Dry quicksand, loose sand which yields easily to weight or pressure

== Places ==
- Quicksand, Kentucky, a town in the United States

== Arts, entertainment, and media ==
=== Films ===
- Quicksands (1913 film), directed by Allan Dwan
- The Quicksands, a 1914 film starring Lillian Gish
- Quicksand (1918 film), starring Henry A. Barrows
- Quicksands (1923 film)
- Quicksand (1950 film), starring Mickey Rooney and Peter Lorre
- Quicksand (2002 film), starring Michael Dudikoff
- Quicksand (2003 film), starring Michael Caine and Michael Keaton

=== Literature ===
- Quicksand (Larsen novel), a 1928 novel by Nella Larsen
- Quicksand (Tanizaki novel), a 1928 novel by Junichiro Tanizaki
- Quicksand, a 1967 novel by John Brunner
- Quicksand, a 2015 novel by Steve Toltz
- Quicksand (Persson Giolito novel), a 2016 novel by Malin Persson Giolito

=== Music ===
- Quicksand (American band), a post-hardcore band formed in 1990
- Quicksand (Welsh band) a band that released an album on Dawn Records in 1973

==== Albums ====
- Quicksands (album), a 1990 album by Karel Kryl
- Quicksand (Noah23 album), a 2002 album by Noah23
- Quicksand (Ted Curson album), a 1976 album by jazz trumpeter Ted Curson
- Störst av allt (album), by Carola Häggkvist

==== Songs ====
- "Quicksand" (Caro Emerald song), 2015
- "Quicksand" (David Bowie song), 1971
- "Quicksand" (La Roux song), 2008
- "Quicksand" (Martha and the Vandellas song), 1963
- "Quicksand" (Morray song), 2020
- "Quicksand" (Tom Chaplin song), 2016
- "Quicksand", 2015 song by Björk from Vulnicura
- "Quicksand", 2012 song by Bridget Mendler from Hello My Name Is...
- "Quicksand", 2008 song by Britney Spears from Circus
- "Quicksand", 2009 song by Keri Hilson from In a Perfect World...
- "Quicksand", 1999 song by Lit from A Place in the Sun
- "Quicksand", 1996 song by Silkworm from Firewater
- "Quicksand", 2017 song by SZA from Insecure (Music from the HBO Original Series)
- "Quicksand", 2011 song by The Story So Far from Under Soil and Dirt
- "Quicksand", 2017 song by Tech N9ne from Strange Reign
- "Quicksand", 2020 song by Theory of a Deadman from Say Nothing
- "Quicksand", 2003 song by Travis from 12 Memories
- "Quicksand", 2019 song by X Ambassadors from Orion

=== Other art, entertainment, and media ===
- Quicksand (board game), a 1989 Parker Brothers board game
- Quicksand (comics), a Marvel Comics supervillain

=== Television ===
- "Quicksand", a 1956 episode of Cheyenne
- Quicksand (TV series), a Swedish crime drama based on the book of the same name by Malin Persson Giolito

== See also ==
- Quicklund
