= List of UK Dance Albums Chart number ones of 2013 =

These are the Official Charts Company's UK Dance Chart number-one albums of 2013. The dates listed in the menus below represent the Saturday after the Sunday the chart was announced, as per the way the dates are given in chart publications such as the ones produced by Billboard, Guinness, and Virgin.

== Chart history ==
Issue date	Album	Artist(s)	Record label	Ref.
5 January	18 Months	Calvin Harris	Columbia	
12 January	18 Months	Calvin Harris	Columbia	
19 January	18 Months	Calvin Harris	Columbia	
26 January	18 Months	Calvin Harris	Columbia	
2 February	18 Months	Calvin Harris	Columbia	
9 February	18 Months	Calvin Harris	Columbia	
16 February	18 Months	Calvin Harris	Columbia	
23 February	Evolution Theory	Modestep	A&M	
2 March	Danny Howard presents Clubbers' Guide 2013	Various Artists	Ministry of Sound	
9 March	18 Months	Calvin Harris	Columbia	
16 March	Saturday Night Club Classics	Various Artists	Ministry of Sound	
23 March	18 Months	Calvin Harris	Columbia	
30 March	Involver 3	Sasha	Ministry of Sound	
6 April	Wideboys present Addicted To Bass 2013	Various Artists	Ministry of Sound	
13 April	Wideboys present Addicted To Bass 2013	Various Artists	Ministry of Sound	
20 April	Floorfillers: Club Anthems	Various Artists	Ministry of Sound	
27 April	Cream Club Anthems 2013	Various Artists	New State	
4 May	18 Months	Calvin Harris	Columbia	
11 May	Home	Rudimental	Asylum	
18 May	Home	Rudimental	Asylum	
25 May	Home	Rudimental	Asylum	
1 June	Home	Rudimental	Asylum	
8 June	Home	Rudimental	Asylum	
15 June	Settle	Disclosure	PMR, Island	
22 June	Settle	Disclosure	PMR, Island	
29 June	Marbella Sessions 2013	Various Artists	Ministry of Sound	
6 July	Marbella Sessions 2013	Various Artists	Ministry of Sound	
13 July	Superstar DJs	Various Artists	Ministry of Sound	
20 July	Holiday Anthems	Various Artists	Ministry of Sound	
27 July	Holiday Anthems	Various Artists	Ministry of Sound	
3 August	Nothing but the Beat	David Guetta	Virgin EMI	
10 August	Mash Up Mix: Ibiza	Various Artists	Ministry of Sound	
17 August	Mash Up Mix: Ibiza	Various Artists	Ministry of Sound	
24 August	Home	Rudimental	Asylum	
31 August	Home	Rudimental	Asylum	
7 September	Home	Rudimental	Asylum	
14 September	Ibiza Annual 2013	Various Artists	Ministry of Sound	
21 September	Ibiza Annual 2013	Various Artists	Ministry of Sound	
28 September	True	Avicii	PRMD, Island	
5 October	True	Avicii	PRMD, Island	
12 October	Torus	Sub Focus	RAM Records, Mercury, Virgin EMI	
19 October	Brand New Machine	Chase & Status	RAM Records, Mercury, MTA Records, Vertigo	
26 October	Brand New Machine	Chase & Status	RAM Records, Mercury, MTA Records, Vertigo	
2 November	Home	Rudimental	Asylum	
9 November	Recharged	Linkin Park	Warner Bros., Machine Shop	
16 November	The Pete Tong Collection	Various Artists	Sony	
23 November	The Pete Tong Collection	Various Artists	Sony	
30 November	The Annual 2014	Various Artists	Ministry of Sound	
7 December	The Annual 2014	Various Artists	Ministry of Sound	
14 December	The Annual 2014	Various Artists	Ministry of Sound	
21 December	The Annual 2014	Various Artists	Ministry of Sound	
28 December	True	Avicii	PRMD, Island	

== See also ==
- List of UK Albums Chart number ones of the 2010s
- List of UK Dance Singles Chart number ones of 2013
- List of UK Album Downloads Chart number ones of the 2010s
- List of UK Independent Singles Chart number ones of 2013
- List of UK R&B Albums Chart number ones of 2013
- List of UK Independent Singles Chart number ones of 2013
