= Liquid lunch =

Liquid lunch may refer to:

- "Liquid Lunch", a 2013 song by Caro Emerald
- "Liquid Lunch", an episode of Archer (season 7)

== See also ==
- Drunkorexia, a colloquialism for self-imposed starvation or binge eating/purging combined with alcohol abuse
- Soup, a primarily liquid food
- Liquid diet
- Three-martini lunch, a leisurely, indulgent lunch enjoyed by businesspeople or lawyers
