= One Day (Caro Emerald song) =

Single by Caro Emerald

from the album The Shocking Miss Emerald
- Released: 13 September 2013
- Recorded: 2012
- Genre: Pop, Jazz, Swing
- Length: 3:36
- Label: Grandmono
- Songwriter(s): Schreurs, DeGiorgio
- Producer(s): David Schreurs, Jan Van Wieringen

Caro Emerald singles chronology
| " Liquid Lunch" (2013) | "One Day" (2013) | "I Belong to You" (2013) |

One Day is a song by Caro Emerald. The song was released as a Digital download on 13 September 2013 in the Benelux as third single from the album The Shocking Miss Emerald. The single was on BBC Radio 2's playlist in the 'A' list. In Flanders (Belgium) the single peaked No25 in Ultratop 50 tipparade. In South Korea the single peaked No152 in the weekly chart (Gaon chart).

== Track listing ==
Digital download
| No. | Title | Length |
|---|---|---|
| 1. | "One Day" (Radio Edit) | 3:36 |
| 2. | "One Day" | 4:23 |
| 3. | "One Day" (Instrumental) | 4:23 |
| 4. | "One Day" (Swing Republic Remix) | 3:36 |

== Charts ==
| Chart (2013) | Peak position |
|---|---|
| Belgium (Ultratip Bubbling Under Flanders) | 25 |
| South Korea (Gaon Chart) | 152 |

== Release history ==
| Region | Date | Format | Label |
|---|---|---|---|
| Netherlands | 13 September 2013 | Digital download | Grandmono |
| United Kingdom | 3 February 2014 | Digital download | Grandmono |
