= I Belong to You (Caro Emerald song) =

Single by Caro Emerald

from the album The Shocking Miss Emerald
- Released: 25 October 2013
- Recorded: 2012
- Genre: Pop, Jazz
- Length: 3:27
- Label: Grandmono
- Songwriter(s): Schreurs, DeGiorgio, Carl Sigman, Bert Kaempfert, Herbert Rehbein
- Producer(s): David Schreurs, Jan Van Wieringen

Caro Emerald singles chronology
"One Day" (2013)	"I Belong to You" (2013)	"Ne Me Quitte Pas" (2014)

I Belong To You is the tenth single of the Dutch singer Caro Emerald, from the album The Shocking Miss Emerald. 'I Belong To You' was released in the Benelux on October 25, 2013. The single was released in Italy on November 8 and released in Switzerland on November 22. The single hasn't been released in the UK yet. The video was filmed at Overtoun House in Milton, Dumbarton outside Glasgow, during a UK tour.

== Track listing ==
Digital download
No.	Title	Length
1.	"I Belong To You" (Radio Edit)	3:06
2.	"I Belong To You" (Instrumental)	3:26

== Charts ==
Chart (2013)	Peak position
Belgium (Ultratip Bubbling Under Flanders)	81
Netherlands (Single Top 100)	99
The Netherlands (Top 40)	48
