= List of UK Independent Singles Chart number ones of 2013 =

These are the Official Charts Company's UK Indie Chart number-one singles of 2013.

== Chart history ==
Key
†	Best-selling indie single of the year

Issue date	Single	Artist(s)	Record label	Ref.
5 January	"He Ain't Heavy, He's My Brother"	Justice Collective	Metropolis	
12 January	"Skyfall"	Adele	XL	
19 January	"Not a Saint"	Vato Gonzalez vs. Lethal Bizzle & Donae'o	New State Music	
26 January	"Skyfall"	Adele	XL	
2 February ^{[a]}	"Get Up (Rattle)"	Bingo Players featuring Far East Movement	Ministry of Sound	
9 February ^{[a]}	"Get Up (Rattle)"	Bingo Players featuring Far East Movement	Ministry of Sound	
16 February ^{[a]}	"Thrift Shop"	Macklemore and Ryan Lewis featuring Wanz	Macklemore LLC	
23 February	"Thrift Shop"	Macklemore and Ryan Lewis featuring Wanz	Macklemore LLC	
2 March	"Thrift Shop"	Macklemore and Ryan Lewis featuring Wanz	Macklemore LLC	
9 March	"Thrift Shop"	Macklemore and Ryan Lewis featuring Wanz	Macklemore LLC	
16 March	"Thrift Shop"	Macklemore and Ryan Lewis featuring Wanz	Macklemore LLC	
23 March	"Thrift Shop"	Macklemore and Ryan Lewis featuring Wanz	Macklemore LLC	
30 March	"Thrift Shop"	Macklemore and Ryan Lewis featuring Wanz	Macklemore LLC	
6 April ^{[a]}	"Let's Get Ready to Rhumble"	Ant & Dec	Sony BMG	
13 April ^{[a]}	"Need U (100%)"	Duke Dumont featuring A*M*E	Ministry of Sound	
20 April ^{[a]}	"Need U (100%)"	Duke Dumont featuring A*M*E	Ministry of Sound	
27 April	"Need U (100%)"	Duke Dumont featuring A*M*E	Ministry of Sound	
4 May	"Can't Hold Us"	Macklemore and Ryan Lewis featuring Ray Dalton	Macklemore LLC	
11 May	"Can't Hold Us"	Macklemore and Ryan Lewis featuring Ray Dalton	Macklemore LLC	
18 May	"So Good to Me"	Chris Malinchak	French Express Records	
25 May	"Let Her Go" †	Passenger	Embassy of Music	
1 June	"Let Her Go" †	Passenger	Embassy of Music	
8 June	"Let Her Go" †	Passenger	Embassy of Music	
15 June	"Let Her Go" †	Passenger	Embassy of Music	
22 June	"Let Her Go" †	Passenger	Embassy of Music	
29 June	"Let Her Go" †	Passenger	Embassy of Music	
6 July	"Let Her Go" †	Passenger	Embassy of Music	
13 July	"Let Her Go" †	Passenger	Embassy of Music	
20 July	"Let Her Go" †	Passenger	Embassy of Music	
27 July	"Let Her Go" †	Passenger	Embassy of Music	
3 August	"Let Her Go" †	Passenger	Embassy of Music	
10 August	"Let Her Go" †	Passenger	Embassy of Music	
17 August	"Let Her Go" †	Passenger	Embassy of Music	
24 August	"Why'd You Only Call Me When You're High?"	Arctic Monkeys	Domino	
31 August	"Earthquake"	DJ Fresh vs. Diplo featuring Dominique Young Unique	Ministry of Sound	
7 September	"Earthquake"	DJ Fresh vs. Diplo featuring Dominique Young Unique	Ministry of Sound	
14 September	"Earthquake"	DJ Fresh vs. Diplo featuring Dominique Young Unique	Ministry of Sound	
21 September	"Same Love"	Macklemore & Ryan Lewis featuring Mary Lambert	Macklemore LLC	
28 September	"Same Love"	Macklemore & Ryan Lewis featuring Mary Lambert	Macklemore LLC	
5 October	"Same Love"	Macklemore & Ryan Lewis featuring Mary Lambert	Macklemore LLC	
12 October	"Same Love"	Macklemore & Ryan Lewis featuring Mary Lambert	Macklemore LLC	
19 October	"Same Love"	Macklemore & Ryan Lewis featuring Mary Lambert	Macklemore LLC	
26 October	"Same Love"	Macklemore & Ryan Lewis featuring Mary Lambert	Macklemore LLC	
2 November	"Same Love"	Macklemore & Ryan Lewis featuring Mary Lambert	Macklemore LLC	
9 November	"Eat, Sleep, Rave, Repeat"	Fatboy Slim With Riva Starr featuring Beardyman	Skint	
16 November ^{[a]}	"Look Right Through"	Storm Queen	Ministry of Sound	
23 November	"Look Right Through"	Storm Queen	Ministry of Sound	
30 November	"Look Right Through"	Storm Queen	Ministry of Sound	
7 December	"Love Is on the Radio"	Mcfly	Super	
14 December	"Look Right Through"	Storm Queen	Ministry of Sound	
21 December	"Happy"	Pharrell Williams	Back Lot Music	
28 December	"Sail"	Awolnation	Red Bull	

== Notes ==
- ^{a} – The single was simultaneously number-one on the singles chart.

== Number-one artists ==
Position	Artist	Weeks at number one
1	Macklemore & Ryan Lewis	16
2	Passenger	13
3	Storm Queen	4
4	Diplo	3
4	DJ Fresh	3
4	Duke Dumont	3
5	Adele	2
5	Bingo Players	2
6	Ant & Dec	1
6	Arctic Monkeys	1
6	Awolnation	1
6	Chris Malinchak	1
6	Fatboy Slim	1
6	Justice Collective	1
6	McFly	1
6	Pharrell Williams	1
6	Vato Gonzalez	1

== See also ==
- List of UK Singles Chart number ones of the 2010s
- List of UK Dance Singles Chart number ones of 2013
- List of UK Singles Downloads Chart number ones of the 2000s
- List of UK Independent Albums Chart number ones of 2013
- List of UK R&B Singles Chart number ones of 2013
- List of UK Rock & Metal Singles Chart number ones of 2013
