= Coming Back as a Man =

"Coming Back As a Man"

Single by Caro Emerald

from the album The Shocking Miss Emerald
- Released: 10 April 2014
- Recorded: 2012
- Genre: Pop, Jazz, Jazz Fusion
- Length: 3:07
- Label: Grandmono Records
- Songwriter(s): Van Wieringen, Veldman, Hoogendorp, Degiorgio, Schreurs
- Producer(s): David Schreurs, Jan Van Wieringen

Caro Emerald singles chronology
"Ne Me Quitte Pas" (2014)	"Coming Back As a Man" (2014)	"Quicksand" (2015)

Coming Back As a Man is a song by Caro Emerald. It was released as a Digital download on 10 April 2014 in the Benelux as 5th single from the album The Shocking Miss Emerald. It was added to the 'A' list on BBC Radio 2.

== Track listing ==
Digital download
No.	Title	Length
1.	"Coming Back As a Man" (Radio Edit)	3:07
2.	"Coming Back As a Man" (New Mix)	3:37
3.	"Coming Back As a Man" (Instrumental)	3:37

== Release history ==
Region	Date	Format	Label
Benelux	10 April 2014	Digital download	Grandmono Records
