= Tangled Up (Caro Emerald song) =

Single by Caro Emerald

from the album The Shocking Miss Emerald
- Released: 18 February 2013
- Recorded: 2012
- Genre: Pop, Jazz, Tango
- Length: 3:17
- Label: Grandmono
- Songwriters: David Schreurs, Vincent Degiorgio, Guy Chambers
- Producers: David Schreurs, Jan van Wieringen

Caro Emerald singles chronology
"Dr. Wanna Do" (2012)	"Tangled Up" (2013)	"Liquid Lunch" (2013)

"Tangled Up" is a song by Caro Emerald. The song was released as a Digital download on 18 February 2013 as the lead single from the album The Shocking Miss Emerald (2013). The song peaked at number 6 in the Netherlands, and has so far peaked at No77 in the UK single chart after being BBC Radio 2's playlist in the 'A' List.

The single was also certified gold by the Federation of the Italian Music Industry.

Italian gymnast Vanessa Ferrari used an instrumental version of the song as her floor exercise routine music during the 2013 World Artistic Gymnastics Championships in Antwerp, Belgium, where she won a silver medal in the floor final

== Music video ==
A music video to accompany the release of "Tangled Up" was first released onto YouTube on 8 March 2013 at a total length of three minutes and twenty-three seconds.

== Track listing ==
Digital download
No.	Title	Length
1.	"Tangled Up"	3:17
2.	"Tangled Up" (Instrumental)	2:17
3.	"Tangled Up" (Vocals)	2:57

== Chart performance ==
=== Weekly charts ===
Weekly chart performance for "Tangled Up"
Chart (2013)	Peak position
Belgium (Ultratip Bubbling Under Flanders)	12
Czech Republic Airplay (ČNS IFPI)	9
Germany (GfK)	81
Italy (FIMI)	23
Netherlands (Dutch Top 40)	16
Netherlands (Single Top 100)	6
UK Singles (OCC)	77

=== Year-end charts ===
Annual chart rankings for "Tangled Up"
Chart (2013)	Position
Italy (FIMI)	94
Netherlands (Dutch Top 40)	73
Netherlands (NPO 3FM)	80

== Certifications ==
Region	Certification	Certified units/sales
Italy (FIMI)	Gold	15,000^{*}
^{*} Sales figures based on certification alone.

== Release history ==
Region	Date	Format	Label
Netherlands	18 February 2013	Digital download	Grandmono
United Kingdom	25 February 2013	Digital download	Grandmono
