= Quicksands (album) =

Tekuté písky

Studio album by Karel Kryl
- Released: 1990
- Recorded: 1989–1990
- Studio: Martin Kratochvíl Studio
- Genre: Folk
- Label: Bonton
- Producer: Jiří Černý

Tekuté písky (Quicksands) is a folk album by Karel Kryl, issued in Czechoslovakia by Bonton in 1990.

Songs for the album were selected by Jiří Černý, who previously worked with Kryl on his most successful album Close the Gate, Little Brother (1969). The album was recorded in the studio of Martin Kratochvíl.

The lyrics to the title track opener Quicksands is adaptation of the poem Wedding Song by Jaroslav Seifert. The lyrics to closer Velvet Spring is Kryl's reflection on the Velvet Revolution.

== Track listing ==
1. Tekuté písky (Quicksands)
2. Ignác (Ignatius)
3. Dvacet (Twenty)
4. Ukolébavka (The Lullaby)
5. Irena (Irene)
6. Vůně (The Scent)
7. Blátivá stráň (Slushy Hillside)
8. Kyselý sníh (Acid Snow)
9. Září (September)
10. Sametové jaro (Velvet Spring)

== Trivia ==
- In 1993, the songs Quicksands and Velvet Spring were included on the compilation The Best (To nejlepší). "The Best Is Yet to Come!" was Kryl's protest of the selected album title (according to an interview for the Czech edition of Playboy.)
