= List of UK Dance Singles Chart number ones of 2013 =

These are the Official Charts Company's UK Dance Chart number-one singles of 2013. The dates listed in the menus below represent the Saturday after the Sunday the chart was announced, as per the way the dates are given in chart publications such as the ones produced by Billboard, Guinness, and Virgin.

== Chart history ==
Key
†	Best-selling dance single of the year

Issue date	Single	Artist(s)	Ref.
5 January	"Don't You Worry Child"	Swedish House Mafia featuring John Martin	
12 January	"Don't You Worry Child"	Swedish House Mafia featuring John Martin	
19 January	"Drinking from the Bottle"	Calvin Harris featuring Tinie Tempah	
26 January	"Drinking from the Bottle"	Calvin Harris featuring Tinie Tempah	
2 February ^{[a]}	"Get Up (Rattle)"	Bingo Players featuring Far East Movement	
9 February ^{[a]}	"Get Up (Rattle)"	Bingo Players featuring Far East Movement	
16 February	"White Noise"	Disclosure featuring AlunaGeorge	
23 February ^{[a]}	"I Could Be The One"	Avicii vs. Nicky Romero	
2 March	"Harlem Shake"	Baauer	
9 March	"I Could Be The One"	Avicii vs. Nicky Romero	
16 March	"I Could Be The One"	Avicii vs. Nicky Romero	
23 March	"I Could Be The One"	Avicii vs. Nicky Romero	
30 March	"White Noise"	Disclosure featuring AlunaGeorge	
6 April	"Feel This Moment"	Pitbull featuring Christina Aguilera	
13 April ^{[a]}	"Need U (100%)"	Duke Dumont featuring A*M*E	
20 April ^{[a]}	"Need U (100%)"	Duke Dumont featuring A*M*E	
27 April ^{[a]}	"Waiting All Night"	Rudimental featuring Ella Eyre	
4 May ^{[a]}	"Get Lucky" †	Daft Punk featuring Pharrell Williams and Nile Rodgers	
11 May ^{[a]}	"Get Lucky" †	Daft Punk featuring Pharrell Williams and Nile Rodgers	
18 May ^{[a]}	"Get Lucky" †	Daft Punk featuring Pharrell Williams and Nile Rodgers	
25 May ^{[a]}	"Get Lucky" †	Daft Punk featuring Pharrell Williams and Nile Rodgers	
1 June ^{[a]}	"La La La"	Naughty Boy featuring Sam Smith	
8 June	"La La La"	Naughty Boy featuring Sam Smith	
15 June	"La La La"	Naughty Boy featuring Sam Smith	
22 June	"La La La"	Naughty Boy featuring Sam Smith	
29 June	"La La La"	Naughty Boy featuring Sam Smith	
6 July	"La La La"	Naughty Boy featuring Sam Smith	
13 July	"La La La"	Naughty Boy featuring Sam Smith	
20 July	"Reload"	Sebastian Ingrosso and Tommy Trash featuring John Martin	
27 July ^{[a]}	"Wake Me Up!"	Avicii	
3 August ^{[a]}	"Wake Me Up!"	Avicii	
10 August ^{[a]}	"Wake Me Up!"	Avicii	
17 August	"Wake Me Up!"	Avicii	
24 August	"Wake Me Up!"	Avicii	
31 August	"Wake Me Up!"	Avicii	
7 September	"Wake Me Up!"	Avicii	
14 September	"Wake Me Up!"	Avicii	
21 September	"Wake Me Up!"	Avicii	
28 September	"You Make Me"	Avicii	
5 October	"You Make Me"	Avicii	
12 October	"Count on Me"	Chase & Status featuring Moko	
19 October	"Count on Me"	Chase & Status featuring Moko	
26 October	"Afterglow"	Wilkinson	
2 November	"Booyah"	Showtek and We Are Loud featuring Sonny Wilson	
9 November	"Eat, Sleep, Rave, Repeat"	Fatboy Slim and Riva Starr featuring Beardyman vs. Calvin Harris	
16 November ^{[a]}	"Look Right Through"	Storm Queen	
23 November ^{[a]}	"Animals"	Martin Garrix	
30 November	"Animals"	Martin Garrix	
7 December ^{[a]}	"Under Control"	Calvin Harris and Alesso featuring Hurts	
14 December	"Under Control"	Calvin Harris and Alesso featuring Hurts	
21 December	"Hey Brother"	Avicii	
28 December	"Hey Brother"	Avicii	

- ^{a} – the single was simultaneously number-one on the singles chart.

== Number-one Dance artists ==
Position	Artist	Weeks at number one
1	Avicii	18
2	Naughty Boy	7
3	Calvin Harris	5
4	Daft Punk	4
4	Nicky Romero	4
6	Duke Dumont	2
6	Chase & Status	2
6	Disclosure	2
6	Martin Garrix	2
6	Bingo Players	2
6	Alesso	2
7	Rudimental	1
7	Storm Queen	1
7	Baauer	1
7	We Are Loud	1
7	Pitbull	1
7	Wilkinson	1
7	Fatboy Slim	1
7	Showtek	1
7	Tommy Trash	1
7	Sebastian Ingrosso	1
7	Swedish House Mafia	1

== See also ==
- List of UK Singles Chart number ones of the 2010s
- List of UK Dance Albums Chart number ones of 2013
- List of UK Singles Downloads Chart number ones of the 2000s
- List of UK Independent Singles Chart number ones of 2013
- List of UK R&B Singles Chart number ones of 2013
- List of UK Rock & Metal Singles Chart number ones of 2013
