= Karel Kryl =

Czechoslovak poet, singer, and songwriter (1944–1994)

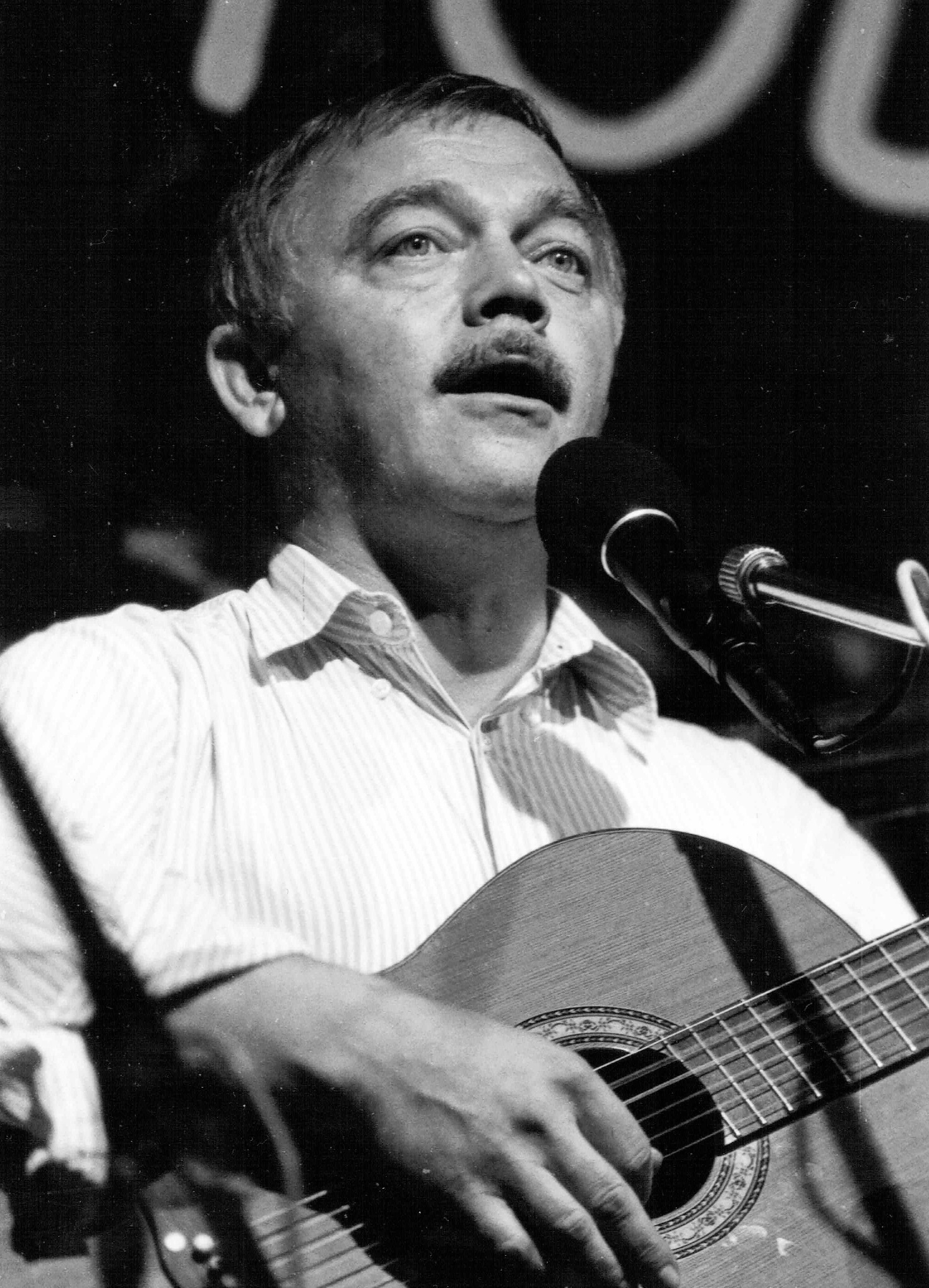

Background information
- Born: 12 April 1944; Kroměříž, Protectorate of Bohemia and Moravia
- Died: 3 March 1994 (aged 49) Munich, Germany
- Genres: folk, Protest song
- Occupations: poet, singer-songwriter, musician, graphic artist
- Instruments: Guitar
- Years active: 1968–1994
- Labels: Supraphon, Primaphon, Caston, Bonton, And the End Records

Karel Kryl (12 April 1944 – 3 March 1994) was a Czechoslovak poet, singer-songwriter and author of many hit protest songs in which he explicitly criticized the Communist (and later also the post-communist) regimes in his home country for their hypocrisy and inhumanity.

The lyrics of Kryl's songs are highly poetic and sophisticated, with perfect rhyming and a frequent use of metaphors and historical allusions. The sparse sounds of his guitar served to underscore the natural flow of the lyrics themselves. Kryl has been compared with the young Bob Dylan, because of the complexity of his lyrics, his accompaniment by a single acoustic guitar, and his great popularity.

Having lived for twenty years in forced exile, he was initially keen on the collapse of communism in his country, but very quickly he became bitterly and uncompromisingly critical of the new regime and its protagonists as well, including Václav Havel, and especially of those who were responsible for the dissolution of Czechoslovakia in 1992.

== Biography ==
Kryl was born on 12 April 1944 in Kroměříž, in the Nazi occupied Protectorate of Bohemia and Moravia, however his family had roots in Nový Jičín, where they later moved to. The Kryl family owned a printing business, which was confiscated from them after the communist takeover in 1948. Kryl planned to be a potter and studied at an industrial secondary school in Bechyně where he specialized in ceramics. He graduated in 1962.

Kryl moved to Prague in 1968 as an assistant at Czechoslovak Television. In his spare time he performed his romantic and satiric folk songs in numerous small clubs. When the Warsaw Pact armies occupied Czechoslovakia on 21 August 1968 to suppress the Prague Spring reform movement, Kryl released his first album. The title song Bratříčku zavírej vrátka (Keep the Gate Closed, Little Brother) was composed spontaneously on 22 August 1968 as an immediate reaction to the occupation. The album described his perception of the inhumanity of the regime and his views on life under communist rule. The album, released in early 1969, was banned and removed from shelves shortly after, but this could not prevent the songs from getting around the audience and becoming cult hits.

Kryl left Czechoslovakia in 1969 to attend a music festival at Waldeck Castle in West Germany. Faced with certainty of imprisonment in his homeland, he decided to apply for political asylum and stay abroad. His second album, Rakovina (meaning "Cancer" in Czech) was banned in Czechoslovakia; however, copies were smuggled into the country and circulated widely. The title song, and other songs on the album, reflected on the paralysis that brought the nation of the Prague Spring on its knees and into a new subjugation; they reference the self-sacrifice of Jan Palach as well as the brutal suppression by the Czechoslovak police of peaceful protests on the first anniversary of the 1968 invasion. Kryl attained a second, German, graduation in 1973 and went on to study art history and journalism at LMU Munich, though he never attained a title. For the majority of his time in exile, Kryl worked for Radio Free Europe and released numerous albums during this period. Though his albums were banned in Czechoslovakia and not played on government-controlled radio stations, many of his songs became iconic back in his homeland, where listening to his records or singing his songs became a major component of underground protest. Kryl went on several tours across Scandinavia, North America and Australia. During this time, he composed songs not only in his native Czech, but also in Polish and German.

In the enthusiastic November days of 1989, during the Velvet Revolution, Kryl returned to Czechoslovakia to attend his mother's funeral. At first, he was thrilled with the end of totalitarianism, but he soon became openly disappointed with the course of transformation of the politics and society. He continued to write protest songs (e.g. Demokracie, "Democracy") criticising politicians and others responsible for the failure of the country's transition to an authentic democracy, especially those who left the Communist party in or after 1989 and suddenly became 'democrats'. Kryl also attacked those who sought to manipulate the Czech and Slovak citizens by nationalist catchphrases and lies about economic transformation. Due to the conditions in the country that he considered unbearable, he decided to leave for Germany again. On 3 March 1994, just a month before his fiftieth birthday, Karel Kryl died of a heart attack in a Munich hospital.

=== Awards ===
- 1989 – the Jan Zahradníček award for Czech Poetry, from the Czechoslovak Literature Club in Los Angeles

in memoriam:

- 1994 – a silver memorial medal from the Charles University for contributions to the spiritual development and the moral support of the nation
- 1995 – František Kriegl award
- 1995 – the Czech Grammy
- 1995 – Medal of Merit II. class from president Václav Havel

=== Bibliography ===
- Hraje a zpívá Karel Kryl
- Kníška Karla Kryla
- Sedm básniček na zrcadlo
- Pochyby
- 17 kryptogramů na dívčí jména
- (Zpod stolu) sebrané spisy
- Slovíčka
- Amoresky
- Z mého plíživota
- Zbraně pro Erató
- LOT
- Sněhurka v hadřících
- POD GRAFIKU
- Půlkacíř
- Texty písní
- Básně
- Krylogie+Půlkacíř
- Rozhovory
- Demokracie, aneb s malou vadou na kráse…

== Discography ==
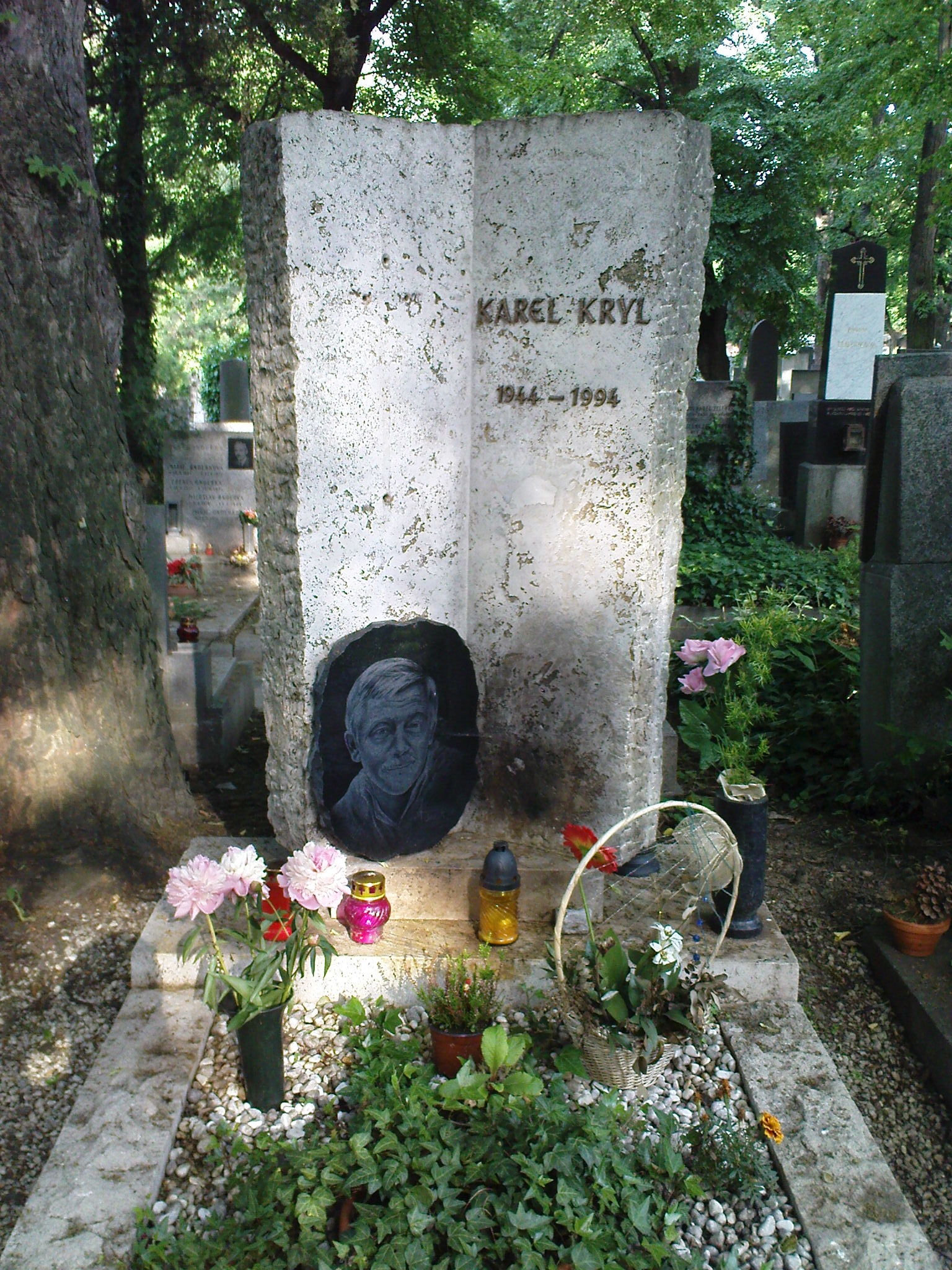
Kryl's grave at the Břevnov cemetery at St. Margaret in Prague

Karel Kryl only released one album in Czechoslovakia (Bratříčku, zavírej vrátka), but he released many albums while in exile, a prominent example would be Tekuté písky.

- Bratříčku, zavírej vrátka (1969, LP, Panton, ČSSR)
- Rakovina (1969, LP, Primaphon, Germany)
- Maškary (1970, LP, Caston, Germany)
- Carmina Resurrectionis (1974, EP, Caston, Germany)
- Karavana mraků (1979, LP, Šafrán 78, Sweden)
- Plaváček (1983)
- Ocelárna (1984, EP)
- Dopisy (1988, MC)
- Tekuté písky (1990, LP, MC, CD, Bonton, Czechoslovakia)
- Dvě půle lunety aneb rebelant o lásce (1992, recitation poems of Karel Kryl)
- Monology (1992, LP, CD, MC Janez, Czechoslovakia)
- To nejlepší 1 (1993, CD, MC, Bonton, Czech Republic)
- Děkuji (1995)
- Jedůfky (1996)
- To nejlepší 2 (1998)
