= Emerald Island (EP) =

EP by Caro Emerald
- Released: 6 March 2017
- Genre: Exotica
- Length: 17:51
- Label: Grandmono
- Producer: David Schreurs; Jan van Wieringen

Caro Emerald chronology
The Shocking Miss Emerald (2013)	Emerald Island (2017)

Emerald Island is an extended play (EP) by Dutch singer Caro Emerald. It was released by Grandmono Records on 6 March 2017 at the start of Emerald’s largest tour to date, the Emerald Island Tour. The EP was produced by David Schreurs and Jan van Wieringen, and written by David Schreurs, Vincent DeGiorgio and Guy Chambers. The EP was inspired by the exotica genre of music, popular in the 50/60's.

== Track listing ==
No.	Title	Length
1.	"Tahitian Skies"	3:44
2.	"The Ghost of You"	3:43
3.	"Never Ever"	3:36
4.	"Exotic Flu"	1:10
5.	"Whatchugot"	3:17
6.	"The Dark"	2:21
Total length:		17:51

== Release history ==
Region	Date	Label	Ref.
Benelux	6 March 2017	Grandmono	
Worldwide	24 March 2017	Grandmono	
