= Quicklund =

Quicklund is a Swedish language surname.

== List of people with the surname ==
- Carl Quicklund (born 1992), Swedish cross-country skier
- Saila Quicklund (born 1961), Swedish politician

== See also ==
- Lund
- Quicksand (disambiguation)
