= The Shocking Miss Emerald =

Studio album by Caro Emerald
- Released: 3 May 2013
- Recorded: 2011–12
- Genres: Jazz; pop; tango
- Length: 48:44
- Labels: Grandmono; Dramatico
- Producers: David Schreurs; Jan van Wieringen

Caro Emerald chronology
Live at the Heineken Music Hall (2011)	The Shocking Miss Emerald (2013)	Emerald Island (2017)

Singles from The Shocking Miss Emerald
- 1. "Tangled Up" Released: 18 February 2013; 2. "Liquid Lunch" Released: 21 May 2013; 3. "One Day" Released: 13 September 2013; 4. "I Belong to You" Released: 25 October 2013; 5. "Coming Back as a Man" Released: 10 April 2014

The Shocking Miss Emerald is the second studio album by Caro Emerald. The album was written and produced by David Schreurs, Vincent Degiorgio, Jan van Wieringen and Emerald, with contributions from Wieger Hoogendorp, Robin Veldman and Guy Chambers and released on 3 May 2013 on Grandmono Records. In the UK, the album was released by Dramatico. The album includes singles "Tangled Up" and "Liquid Lunch".

In the UK, Emerald performed tracks from the album at BBC Radio Theatre, which was broadcast on BBC Radio 2 and on the BBC Red Button. The Shocking Miss Emerald debuted atop the UK Albums Chart with 34,246 copies sold in its first week, becoming Emerald's first UK number-one album.

== Singles ==
"Tangled Up" written by Schreurs, Degiorgio and Guy Chambers was released as the lead single from the album on 18 February 2013. The song reached number sixteen on the Dutch Top 40, number seventy-seven on the UK Singles Chart, it has also been a Top 20 hit in New Zealand.

"Liquid Lunch" was released as the second single from the album on 21 May 2013. It was BBC Radio 2's Record of the Week and joined their playlist in mid-May 2013; it was 'A' listed, just as "Tangled Up" had been. As of Sunday 2 June it had reached No. 10 on the UK Indie Chart.

== Critical reception ==
The album received generally positive reviews from music critics. Simon Price of The Independent gave the album a positive review stating, "The danger facing this Dutch diva as she follows up the multi-platinum Deleted Scenes… in a marketplace packed with similarly retro-styled chanteuses is that she'll sound like a redundant cabaret turn. What saves TSME is its often-inspired mix of vintage jazz and modern hip hop. Her secret weapon, in this respect, is producer David Schreurs, who rescues Emerald’s second album from turning into one long perfume ad, albeit a charming one." Stephen Unwin of the Daily Express said, "it is stylish and jazz-age infused. The stakes are high as Caro's breakthrough album sold like a crazy thing but those stakes needn't have worried. Sassy, smouldering and quite possibly the soundtrack to your summer."

== Track listing ==
Standard listing
No.	Title	Writer(s)	Producer(s)	Length
1.	"Miss Emerald: Intro"	Jules Buckley		0:39
2.	"One Day"	David Schreurs, Vincent DeGiorgio		4:32
3.	"Coming Back as a Man"	Schreurs, DeGiorgio, Jan Van Wieringen, Robin Veldman, Wieger Hoogendorp		3:34
4.	"Tangled Up"	Schreurs, DeGiorgio, Guy Chambers	Jan Van Wieringen, David Schreurs	3:17
5.	"Completely"	Caroline Van Der Leeuw, Schreurs, DeGiorgio, Hoogendorp		2:29
6.	"Black Valentine"	Schreurs, DeGiorgio, Van Wieringen, Veldman, Hoogendorp,		5:03
7.	"Pack Up the Louie"	Schreurs, DeGiorgio		3:33
8.	"I Belong to You"	Schreurs, DeGiorgio, Carl Sigman, Bert Kaempfert, Herbert Rehbein		3:27
9.	"The Maestro"	Van Der Leeuw, Schreurs, DeGiorgio, Van Wieringen, Daan Herweg		2:37
10.	"Liquid Lunch"	Schreurs, DeGiorgio, Van Wieringen, Veldman, Hoogendorp		3:59
11.	"Excuse My French"	Schreurs, DeGiorgio		3:52
12.	"Paris"	Van Der Leeuw, Schreurs, DeGiorgio, Hoogendorp		4:47
13.	"My 2 Cents"	Van Der Leeuw, Schreurs, DeGiorgio		3:45
14.	"The Wonderful in You"	Van Der Leeuw, DeGiorgio, Hoogendorp		3:10
15.	"Tell Me How Long (hidden bonus track)"			2:29

Deluxe Edition bonus tracks
No.	Title	Writer(s)	Length
16.	"No Charge"	Schreurs, DeGiorgio	2:33
17.	"The Bullet"	Chambers, Degiorgio, Schreurs	2:30

== Charts ==
=== Weekly charts ===
Chart (2013)	Peak position
Australian Albums (ARIA)	69
Austrian Albums (Ö3 Austria)	3
Belgian Albums (Ultratop Flanders)	31
Belgian Albums (Ultratop Wallonia)	77
Dutch Albums (Album Top 100)	1
French Albums (SNEP)	166
German Albums (Offizielle Top 100)	3
Hungarian Albums (MAHASZ)	22
Irish Albums (IRMA)	71
Italian Albums (FIMI)	22
Polish Albums (ZPAV)	17
Scottish Albums (Official Charts)	1
Slovenian Albums Chart	27
Swiss Albums (Schweizer Hitparade)	3
UK Albums (Official Charts)	1
UK Indie Albums (OCC)	1
UK Jazz & Blues Albums (OCC)	1

=== Year-end charts ===
Chart (2013)	Position
Belgian Albums (Ultratop Flanders)	131
Dutch Albums (Album Top 100)	3
UK Albums (OCC)	46
Chart (2014)	Position
Dutch Albums (Album Top 100)	45

== Certifications ==
Region	Certification	Certified units/sales
Netherlands (NVPI)	Platinum	50,000^{^}
United Kingdom (BPI)	Gold	100,000^{^}
^{^} Shipments figures based on certification alone.

== Release history ==
Region	Date	Label	Format
Netherlands	3 May 2013	Grandmono Records	CD, digital download
United Kingdom	6 May 2013	Grandmono Records, Dramatico	CD, digital download
