= Quicksand (Caro Emerald song) =

Single by Caro Emerald
- Released: April 24, 2015 (The Netherlands)
- Recorded: 2015
- Genre: Pop
- Length: 3:30
- Label: Grandmono Records
- Songwriters: Robin Veldman, Wieger Hoogendorp, Jan van Wieringen, Vince Degiorgio, Caroline van der Leeuw
- Producers: David Schreurs, Jan Van Wieringen

Caro Emerald singles chronology
"Coming Back as a Man" (2014)	"Quicksand" (2015)	"Whatchugot" (2017)

"Quicksand" is the thirteenth single by Dutch singer Caro Emerald. It was released as a Digital download on April 24, 2015, in the Netherlands as the planned lead single from her third studio album. It was added to the 'B' list on BBC Radio Two. The song eventually didn't end up on any album.

== Track listing ==
Digital download
No.	Title	Length
1.	"Quicksand"	3:30
2.	"Quicksand" (Instrumental version)	3:30
3.	"Quicksand" (Acapella)	3:30

== Charts ==
=== Weekly charts ===
Chart (2015)	Peak position
Hungary (Single Top 40)	10
The Netherlands (Megacharts)	103
The Netherlands (Top 40)	53

=== Year-end charts ===
Chart (2015)	Position
Hungary (Single Top 40)	99
