= Riviera Life =

Single by Caro Emerald

from the album Deleted Scenes from the Cutting Room Floor
- Released: 15 April 2011
- Genre: Jazz, pop
- Length: 3:30
- Label: Grandmono
- Songwriters: David Schreurs, Vincent DeGiorgio, Jan van Wieringen
- Producers: David Schreurs, Jan Van Wieringen

Caro Emerald singles chronology
"Stuck" (2010)	"Riviera Life" (2011)	"You're All I Want For Christmas" (2011)

"Riviera Life" is the fifth single by Dutch jazz singer Caro Emerald from her debut album Deleted Scenes from the Cutting Room Floor. It was released on 15 April 2011 as a Digital download in the Netherlands. Written by David Schreurs and Vincent Degiorgio, the song is based on a scene in Hitchcock's 1955 movie To Catch A Thief.

== Track listing ==
Riviera Life - EP

1. "Riviera Life" – 3:28
2. "Close to Me / Riviera Life" (Live @ The Heineken Music Hall) - 5:40
3. "Riviera Life" (Instrumental) - 3:30
4. "Riviera Life" (Acapella) - 3:10

== Chart performance ==
=== Weekly charts ===
Chart (2011)	Peak position
Netherlands (Dutch Top 40)	18
Netherlands (Single Top 100)	70

=== Year-end charts ===
Chart (2011)	Position
Netherlands (Dutch Top 40)	86

== Release history ==
Country	Date	Format	Label
Netherlands	15 April 2011	Digital download	Grandmono
Italy	3 June 2011	Digital download	Grandmono
