= Back It Up (Caro Emerald song) =

Single by Caro Emerald

from the album Deleted Scenes from the Cutting Room Floor
- Released: 6 July 2009
- Genre: Hip hop, R&B, jazz
- Length: 3:52 (Album Version); 3:34 (Radio Edit); 3:34 (Madcon Radio Edit)
- Label: Grandmono
- Songwriters: Degiorgio, Schreurs, van Wieringen, Veldman

Caro Emerald singles chronology
"Back It Up" (2009)	"A Night like This" (2009)

"Back It Up" is the debut single by Caro Emerald taken from the debut album Deleted Scenes from the Cutting Room Floor. It was released on 6 July 2009. The single was certified gold by the Federation of the Italian Music Industry.

== Background ==
Emerald was originally hired as the demo singer for the song in 2007, by producers Jan van Wieringen and David Schreurs who had written the song with Robin Veldman and Vincent DeGiorgio. Caro's jazzy vocal style was considered a "perfect match", but the song remained unused until 2008, when Caro asked if she could add the song to her live repertoire. The immediate reaction inspired van Wieringen, Schreurs, Degiorgio and Emerald to write and produce the album Deleted Scenes from the Cutting Room Floor, starring Caro Emerald.

== Music video ==
In 2008, a music video was directed by Eva Zanen and edited by Jurjen van Blokland and was shot in Café Schiller, Amsterdam. The video features Caro Emerald as barmaid and several old men, presumably guests. While polishing the glasses and serving her guests, Caro Emerald sings and dances together with the old men. There are several scenes that show alcoholic beverages with references to the lyrics of the song as well as gramophones and instruments such as trombones and contrabasses. The video is sepia toned. On July 8 an alternative, 'international', music video premiered. This video features Caro Emerald in a black & white performance, an old newspaper and a black & white film. After the initial success of the song, a new high budget video was shot and released in April 2010.

== Track listing ==
Back It Up – EP

1. "Back It Up" – 3:52
2. "Back It Up" (radio edit) – 3:34
3. "Back It Up" (instrumental) – 3:51
4. "Back It Up" (a cappella) – 3:25

Back It Up (Kraak & Smaak Remix) - Single

1. "Back It Up" (Kraak & Smaak remix) – 5:26

Back It Up (Hitmeister D Remix)

1. "Back It Up" (Hitmeister D remix) – 4:29

== Charts ==
=== Weekly charts ===
Chart (2009–2010)	Peak position
Belgium (Ultratop 50 Flanders)	33
Belgium (Ultratip Bubbling Under Wallonia)	2
Germany (GfK)	70
Italy (FIMI)	17
Italy Airplay (EarOne)	1
Netherlands (Dutch Top 40)	12
Netherlands (Single Top 100)	13

=== Year-end charts ===
Chart (2009)	Position
Netherlands (Dutch Top 40)	67
Netherlands (Single Top 100)	61

Chart (2010)	Position
Italy (FIMI)	100
Italy Airplay (EarOne)	18
Netherlands (Single Top 100)	100

== Certifications ==
Region	Certification	Certified units/sales
Italy (FIMI)	Gold	15,000^{*}
^{*} Sales figures based on certification alone.
