= That Man (song) =

Single by Caro Emerald

from the album Deleted Scenes from the Cutting Room Floor
- Released: 14 May 2010 (The Netherlands)
- Genre: Jazz, swing
- Length: 3:52
- Label: Grandmono
- Songwriters: David Schreurs, Vincent Degiorgio
- Producers: David Schreurs, Jan Van Wieringen

Caro Emerald singles chronology
| "A Night like This" (2009) | "That Man" (2010) | "Stuck" (2010) |

"That Man" is a single by Dutch jazz and pop-swing singer Caro Emerald. It was released on 14 May 2010 as a digital download as the third single from the album Deleted Scenes from the Cutting Room Floor in the Netherlands, while it was released on 2 December 2011 as a CD single and as a digital download as the fourth single from the album in Germany. The song was featured in the opening scene of Marvel's Agent Carter, Season 1, Episode 1.

== Music video ==
A music video to accompany the release of "That Man" was first released onto YouTube on 1 July 2010 at a total length of three minutes and fifty-one seconds.

== Track listing ==
That Man – Single

1. "That Man" – 3:52
2. "That Man" (Radio Edit) – 3:19
3. "That Man" (Instrumental) – 3:47

== Chart performance ==
| Chart (2010) | Peak position |
|---|---|
| Netherlands (Dutch Top 40) | 22 |
| Netherlands (Single Top 100) | 29 |
| UK Singles (Official Charts) | 84 |
| UK Indie (Official Charts) | 9 |

== Release history ==
| Country | Date | Format | Label |
|---|---|---|---|
| Netherlands | 14 May 2010 | Digital download | Grandmono |
| Germany | 2 December 2011 | Digital download | Grandmono |
| Germany | 2 December 2011 | CD single | Grandmono |

In January 2015, the song was used in the pilot episode of the American TV series Agent Carter. The song was also used in the season three The Vampire Diaries episode "Do Not Go Gentle" and in the Disneynature film Chimpanzee.
