= A Night like This (song) =

Single by Caro Emerald

from the album Deleted Scenes from the Cutting Room Floor
- Released: 18 December 2009 (The Netherlands)
- Genre: Jazz pop
- Length: 3:47
- Label: Grandmono
- Songwriters: David Schreurs, Vince Degiorgio, Jan van Wieringen
- Producers: David Schreurs, Jan van Wieringen

Caro Emerald singles chronology
"Back It Up" (2009)	"A Night like This" (2009)	"That Man" (2010)

"A Night like This" is the second single by Caro Emerald, taken from the album Deleted Scenes from the Cutting Room Floor. It was released on 11 December 2009 in the Netherlands after it was first presented in an online Martini commercial on 16 October. Being released in 2010 in Europe, including the UK where it peaked at Number 65 in the UK Singles Chart. It was added to the 'A' list on BBC Radio One.

== Writing and recording ==
The song was written by David Schreurs and Vince Degiorgio. Schreurs told HitQuarters he created the track for "A Night like This" while Degiorgio packed his bags to leave for his hometown Toronto, and then the two "sat down for an hour and knocked out the song". The lyrics are based on a specific scene in the 1967 Bond movie Casino Royale. "A Night Like This" was arranged by Schreurs and produced by Schreurs and Jan van Wieringen. A video for the song was shot in Amsterdam and Opatija, Lovran and Rijeka in Croatia.

The song has been used in the sixth episode of season 3 of Pretty Little Liars, "Remains of the 'A'" and episode 16 of The Secret Circle, "Lucky". In season one of the TV series Go On, it was used as the opening theme in one of the episodes. The song has also been used in advertising campaigns for Martini, Wrigley, Nestlé amongst others.

== Track listing ==
A Night like This – EP

1. "A Night like This" – 3:46
2. "A Night like This" (instrumental) – 3:46
3. "A Night like This" (a cappella) – 3:36
4. "Back It Up" (feat. Madcon) – 3:51

A Night like This – Single (Tom Trago remix)

1. "A Night like This" (Tom Trago remix) – 3:51

== Charts ==
=== Weekly charts ===
Chart (2010)	Peak position
Italy Airplay (EarOne)	1
Netherlands (Dutch Top 40)	2
Netherlands (Single Top 100)	1
Poland Airplay (ZPAV)	2
Poland (Polish Airplay New)	1
Chart (2011)	Peak position
Austria (Ö3 Austria Top 40)	1
Germany (GfK)	4
Germany (Airplay Chart)	7
Italy (FIMI)	10
Romania (UPFR)	1
Romania Airplay (Media Forest)	1
Switzerland (Schweizer Hitparade)	9
UK Singles (Official Charts)	65
UK Indie (Official Charts)	6

=== Year-end charts ===
Chart (2010)	Position
Italy Airplay (EarOne)	86
Netherlands (Dutch Top 40)	5
Netherlands (Single Top 100)	3
Chart (2011)	Position
Austria (Ö3 Austria Top 40)	15
Germany (Official German Charts)	14
Italy (Musica e dischi)	66
Romania (Romanian Top 100)	45
Switzerland (Schweizer Hitparade)	57

== Certifications ==
Region	Certification	Certified units/sales
Austria (IFPI Austria)	Gold	15,000^{*}
Germany (BVMI)	Platinum	300,000^{^}
Italy (FIMI)	Gold	15,000^{*}
Switzerland (IFPI Switzerland)	Platinum	30,000^{^}
^{*} Sales figures based on certification alone.^{^} Shipments figures based on certification alone.

== See also ==
- List of Romanian Top 100 number ones of the 2010s
