= Deleted Scenes from the Cutting Room Floor =

Studio album by Caro Emerald
- Released: 29 January 2010
- Recorded: 2009
- Genre: Jazz pop
- Length: 47:00
- Label: Grandmono
- Producer: David Schreurs, Jan van Wieringen

Caro Emerald chronology
Deleted Scenes from the Cutting Room Floor (2010)	Live at the Heineken Music Hall (2011)

Singles from Deleted Scenes from the Cutting Room Floor
- 1. "Back It Up" Released: 6 July 2009; 2. "A Night Like This" Released: 11 December 2009; 3. "That Man" Released: 14 May 2010; 4. "Stuck" Released: 26 October 2010; 5. "Riviera Life" Released: 15 April 2011

Platinum Edition
- 2010 Platinum Edition

Professional ratings
Review scores
Source	Rating
Allmusic	3.5/5 stars
BBC	(positive)
MusicOMH	4/5 stars

Deleted Scenes from the Cutting Room Floor is the debut album by Dutch singer Caro Emerald. The album was conceived, written and produced as a studio project by David Schreurs, Vincent Degiorgio, Jan van Wieringen and Caroline van der Leeuw, and released in the Netherlands with Emerald as the starring artist on 29 January 2010 on their own label Grandmono.

The album was preceded by the hit singles "Back It Up", officially released in the Netherlands on 6 July 2009, and "A Night Like This", released on 11 December 2009.

On 28 June 2011, a new version of the album has been released in Italy, featuring a DVD, three bonus tracks recorded live, and a duet with Italian singer Giuliano Palma in the song "(Vivere) Riviera Life".

== Background ==
The title refers to a figurative term in the film industry. Scenes were cut in the so-called cutting room, where the deleted and therefore unused scenes fell to the cutting room floor. In accordance with the movie theme, David Schreurs and Vincent Degiorgio are credited as creative directors for creating the visual and conceptual world around the music, like artwork and videos. Each song also has an individual synopsis, written by Degiorgio and added as liner notes to the album artwork.

== Chart performance ==
The album debuted at number one in the Dutch Albums Chart. Between 6 February 2010 and 28 August 2010, the album left the top spot for two weeks only, in April and in June, replaced by Jan Smit's Leef and Alain Clark's Colorblind, respectively. On 20 August 2010, Deleted Scenes from the Cutting Room Floor spent its 27th non-consecutive week at number one and became the longest running number-one album in the Netherlands, beating Michael Jackson's Thriller, which held the top spot for 26 weeks in 1983. The album later returned to #1, spending a total of 30 non-consecutive weeks on top of the Dutch Albums Chart.

Moreover, as of September 2011, Deleted Scenes from the Cutting Room Floor spent a total of 77 weeks in the Dutch Top 10, tying with Michael Jackson's Thriller as the longest ever running album there.

In October 2010, the album was released by Dramatico Records in the United Kingdom and in several other European countries. It later reached the Top 5 in Germany (#5), Poland and Austria (#3). In May 2011, the album also reached the Top 10 in the UK Albums Chart, jumping from number 140 during its fourth week in the chart. In July 2011, Deleted Scenes from the Cutting Room Floor peaked at number 4 on the UK Albums Chart. As of May 2013, the album has sold 410,000 copies in the UK. The album was certified Platinum in 2011 by IFPI for sales of over million units in Europe.

== Track listing ==
No.	Title	Writer(s)	Length
1.	"That Man"	David Schreurs, Vincent Degiorgio	3:51
2.	"Just One Dance"	David Schreurs, Vincent Degiorgio	4:01
3.	"Riviera Life"	David Schreurs, Vincent Degiorgio	3:29
4.	"Back It Up"	David Schreurs, Vincent Degiorgio, Jan van Wieringen, Robin Veldman	3:53
5.	"The Other Woman"	David Schreurs, Jan van Wieringen, Caroline Esmeralda van der Leeuw, Vincent Degiorgio	5:33
6.	"Absolutely Me"	David Schreurs, Vincent Degiorgio	2:46
7.	"You Don't Love Me"	David Schreurs, Vincent Degiorgio, van der Leeuw	3:54
8.	"Dr. Wanna Do"	Daan Herweg, van Wieringen, van der Leeuw, Vincent Degiorgio, David Schreurs	3:02
9.	"Stuck"	David Schreurs, Vincent Degiorgio	4:33
10.	"I Know That He's Mine"	David Schreurs, van der Leeuw, Vincent Degiorgio	4:17
11.	"A Night like This"	David Schreurs, Vincent Degiorgio	3:47
12.	"The Lipstick on His Collar"	David Schreurs, Rozeboom, Vincent Degiorgio	3:37
Total length:			47:00

Deluxe Edition bonus tracks
No.	Title	Writer(s)	Length
13.	"That Man" (Palov Remix feat. A. Angelidis)	Schreurs, Degiorgio	3:54
14.	"Stuck" (KiNK Remix)	Schreurs, Degiorgio	6:14
15.	"Bad Romance" (Caro Emerald feat. The Grandmono Orchestra)	Stefani Germanotta, Nadir Khayat	3:52

German Deluxe Edition bonus tracks
No.	Title	Writer(s)	Length
13.	"A Night Like This" (Dorian White Remix)	Schreurs, van Wieringen, Degiorgio	5:09
14.	"A Night Like This" (Art Alec Remix)	Schreurs, van Wieringen, Degiorgio	6:06
15.	"Back It Up" (Madcon Radio Edit)	Schreurs, van Wieringen, Robin Veldman, Degiorgio	3:35

=== Italian Platinum Edition ===
No.	Title	Writer(s)	Length
1.	"That Man"	David Schreurs, Vincent Degiorgio	3:51
2.	"Just One Dance"	Schreurs, Jan van Wieringen, Degiorgio	4:01
3.	"(Vivere) Riviera Life" (feat. Giuliano Palma)	Schreurs, van Wieringen, Sander Rozeboom, Degiorgio	3:29
4.	"Back It Up"	Schreurs, van Wieringen, Robin Veldman, Degiorgio	3:53
5.	"The Other Woman"	Schreurs, van Wieringen, Caroline Esmeralda van der Leeuw, Degiorgio	5:33
6.	"Absolutely Me"	Schreurs, Degiorgio	2:46
7.	"You Don't Love Me"	Schreurs, van der Leeuw, Degiorgio	3:54
8.	"Dr. Wanna Do"	Daan Herweg, Schreurs, van Wieringen, van der Leeuw, Degiorgio	3:02
9.	"Stuck"	Schreurs, Degiorgio	4:33
10.	"I Know That He's Mine"	Schreurs, van der Leeuw, Degiorgio	4:17
11.	"A Night like This"	Schreurs, Degiorgio, van Wieringen	3:47
12.	"The Lipstick on His Collar"	Schreurs, Rozeboom, Degiorgio	3:37
13.	"Riviera Life"	Schreurs, van Wieringen, Sander Rozeboom, Degiorgio	3:29
14.	"Back It Up" (Live in Rome)	Schreurs, van Wieringen, Robin Veldman, Degiorgio	3:35
15.	"A Night Like This" (Live in Rome)	Schreurs, van Wieringen, Degiorgio	5:07
16.	"The Lipstick On His Collar" (Live in Rome)	Schreurs, Rozeboom, Degiorgio	5:32
Total length:			64:07

== Charts ==
=== Charts ===
Weekly chart performance for Deleted Scenes from the Cutting Room Floor
Chart (2010–2011)	Peak position
Austrian Albums (Ö3 Austria)	3
Belgian Albums (Ultratop Flanders)	32
Dutch Albums (Album Top 100)	1
French Albums (SNEP)	79
German Albums (Offizielle Top 100)	5
Greek Albums (IFPI Greece)	27
Italian Albums (FIMI)	14
Polish Albums (ZPAV)	3
Scottish Albums (OCC)	5
Swiss Albums (Schweizer Hitparade)	10
UK Albums (OCC)	4

=== Year-end charts ===
2010 year-end performance for Deleted Scenes from the Cutting Room Floor
Chart (2010)	Position
Dutch Albums (Album Top 100)	1

2011 year-end performance for Deleted Scenes from the Cutting Room Floor
Chart (2011)	Position
Austrian Albums (Ö3 Austria)	24
Dutch Albums (Album Top 100)	4
German Albums (Offizielle Top 100)	18
Polish Albums (ZPAV)	26
Swiss Albums (Schweizer Hitparade)	55
UK Albums (OCC)	35

2012 year-end performance for Deleted Scenes from the Cutting Room Floor
Chart (2012)	Position
Dutch Albums (Album Top 100)	77

2013 year-end performance for Deleted Scenes from the Cutting Room Floor
Chart (2013)	Position
Dutch Albums (Album Top 100)	81

== Certifications ==
Region	Certification	Certified units/sales
Austria (IFPI Austria)	Gold	10,000^{*}
Germany (BVMI)	Platinum	200,000^{^}
Netherlands (NVPI)	6× Platinum	300,000^{^}
Poland (ZPAV)	3× Platinum	60,000^{*}
Switzerland (IFPI Switzerland)	Gold	15,000^{^}
United Kingdom (BPI)	Platinum	300,000^{^}
Summaries
Europe (IFPI)	Platinum	1,000,000^{*}
^{*} Sales figures based on certification alone.^{^} Shipments figures based on certification alone.
