= Bratříčku, zavírej vrátka =

Studio album by Karel Kryl
- Released: 24 March 1969
- Recorded: 1967–1968
- Genre: Folk music
- Length: 45:23
- Label: Panton
- Producer: Jiří Černý

Karel Kryl chronology
Bratříčku, zavírej vrátka (1969)	Rakovina (1969)

Bratříčku, zavírej vrátka (English: Close the Gate, Little Brother) is the debut album by Karel Kryl, issued in Czechoslovakia by Panton in 1969. The album was recorded in Ostrava between 1967 and 1968. It was produced by Jiří Černý, who also wrote the liner notes. The cover features photography by Josef Koudelka.

== Track listing ==
1. "Bratříčku, zavírej vrátka" – 2:15
2. "Král a klaun" – 4:15 (The King and the Clown)
3. "Salome" – 2:50
4. "Veličenstvo kat" – 4:50 (His Majesty, the Executioner)
5. "Důchodce" – 1:45 (The Pensioner)
6. "Anděl" – 3:05 (The Angel)
7. "Morituri te salutant" – 3:15
8. "Pieta" – 3:25 (The Pieta)
9. "Podivná ruleta" – 4:40 (Weird Roulette)
10. "Znamení doby" – 2:40 (Sign of the Times)
11. "Píseň Neznámého vojína" – 2:45 (Written by an Unknown Soldier)
12. "Nevidomá dívka" – 4:30 (Blind Girl)
13. "Jeřabiny" – 1:45 (Rowanberries)
14. "Pasážová revolta" – 2:45 (Passage Revolt)
