= Caroline van der Leeuw =

Dutch pop and jazz singer

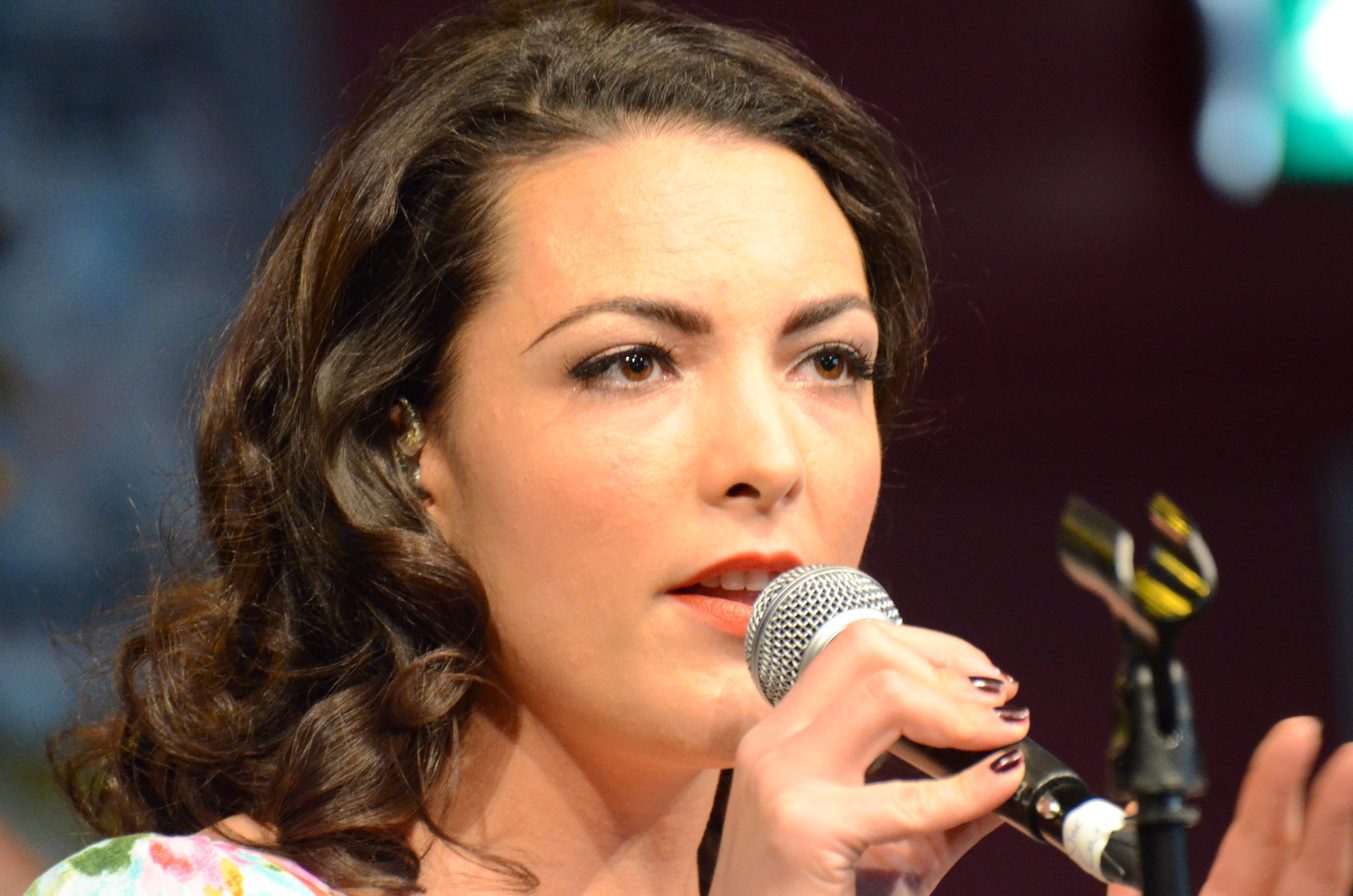
- Van der Leeuw performing in Hilversum, 2013

Background information
- Also known as: Caro Emerald
- Born: Caroline Esmeralda van der Leeuw; 26 April 1981 (age 45); Amsterdam, Netherlands
- Genres: Jazz; pop; swing; electro swing
- Occupation: Singer
- Instrument: Vocals
- Years active: 2007–present
- Label: Grandmono Records
- Member of: The Jordan
- Website: www.caroemerald.com www.thejordanmusic.com www.caromusicofficial.com

Caroline Esmeralda van der Leeuw (born 26 April 1981), formerly known as Caro Emerald and The Jordan, currently under the name Caro, is a Dutch pop and jazz singer who mainly performs in English. Active since 2007, she rose to prominence in 2009 with debut single, "Back It Up". Follow-up single "A Night Like This" topped charts in several countries, including her native Netherlands.

Her debut album, Deleted Scenes from the Cutting Room Floor, was released on 29 January 2010. By August 2010, the album had spent its 30th week at number one in the Dutch album charts, setting an all-time record and beating Michael Jackson's Thriller by one week. On 3 October 2010, Emerald was awarded the Dutch music prize Edison Award for Best Female Artist. In 2013 a second studio album was released titled The Shocking Miss Emerald. The album entered at number one in the Dutch and United Kingdom album charts.

== Early and personal life ==
Caroline Esmeralda van der Leeuw was born on 26 April 1981 in Amsterdam to a Dutch father and an Aruban mother. She started singing lessons at age 12 with James Gilloffo in Amsterdam and joined a girl vocal group, Les Elles, under his guidance. Following high school, she trained as a jazz vocalist at the Amsterdam Conservatory, graduating in 2005.

In March 2014, Van der Leeuw gave birth to her first daughter. She gave birth to a second daughter in August 2017.

== Career ==
=== 2007–2008: Career beginnings ===
In early 2007, Dutch producer Jan van Wieringen invited Van der Leeuw to sing the vocal on a track he was producing with producer/songwriter David Schreurs. The song, "Back It Up", had been written by Schreurs and Canadian songwriter Vince Degiorgio and was based around a hip-hop beat created by Robin Veldman and Jan van Wieringen. Van der Leeuw's jazzy vocal was considered a "perfect match" for the new song.

The demo was pitched to various publishers and labels but without result. The demo then reached public notice around the world online and radio stations started playing the song.

Degiorgio, Schreurs, van Wieringen and Van der Leeuw realised their sound had potential and started working on a conceptual studio album with Van der Leeuw as "starring artist". Writing began in the summer of 2008 using the mix of "Back It Up", 1940s to 1950s jazz, easy listening, orchestral Latin, combined with infectious beats as a model. Adopting a sample based approach but with live instrumentation, the writing sessions drew from a wide range of influences including jazz organist Jackie Davis, exotica composer Martin Denny, mambo king Perez Prado, 1920s to 1930s jazz, and Van der Leeuw's own vocal inspirations of The Andrews Sisters, Billie Holiday and Sarah Vaughan. Their usual method would be for Schreurs to create the ideas and backing tracks, and then get together with top line writer and lyricist Degiorgio to write the songs. Van der Leeuw co-wrote several songs on the album, and van Wieringen co-created the tracks for "The Other Woman" and "Dr Wanna Do". Schreurs and Degiorgio are credited as "Creative Directors".

=== 2009–2012: Deleted Scenes from the Cutting Room Floor ===
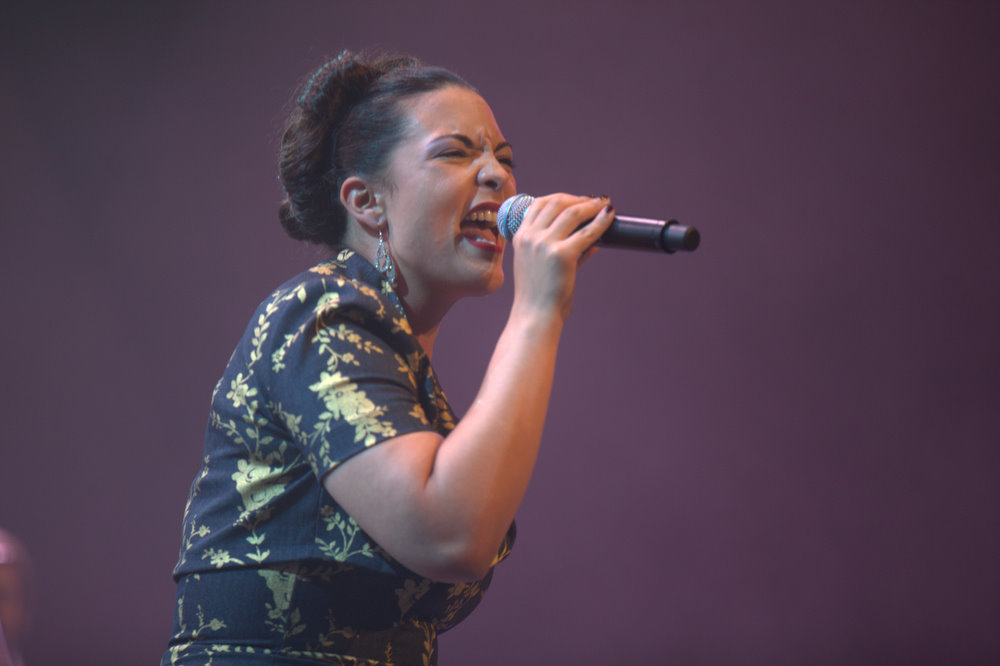
Emerald singing in Rotterdam, Netherlands on 9 July 2010

After record labels either refused or failed to sign the project, Schreurs set up their own label, Grandmono. "Back It Up" was released as debut single on 6 July 2009. The song gained airplay and popularity overnight and listed in the Dutch Top 40 for 12 weeks, peaking at No. 12. It became the most played song on 3FM in 2009.

Emerald's debut album, Deleted Scenes from the Cutting Room Floor, was released on 28 January 2010 in The Netherlands by Grandmono. It entered at #1 in the Album Charts and stayed there for weeks. By August 2010, the album had been #1 for 27 weeks, beating Michael Jackson's chart record for Thriller (26 weeks #1 in 1983). The album returned to #1, spending a total of 30 non-consecutive weeks on top spot of the Dutch Albums Chart.

The album reached double platinum (>100,000 copies) status in the Netherlands on 5 July 2010. It reached triple platinum in August 2010, four times platinum (200,000) in November 2010, and sextuple platinum (>300,000 copies) in December 2011. Deleted Scenes from the Cutting Room Floor was removed from the Dutch charts after 104 weeks due to a rule providing albums can't spend >2 years on the charts. Upon re-entry, the album climbed back to #8.

The album's second single, "A Night Like This", was released in December 2009. It was listed in the Dutch Charts for 26 weeks peaking at #1 in January 2010. It was the most played song in The Netherlands in 2010.

In 2011, Deleted Scenes from the Cutting Room Floor was released throughout Europe with great commercial success. It became a hit in the UK (1× platinum with sales exceeding 360,000, 8 weeks top 10 peaking at No. 4), Germany (1× platinum with sales exceeding 280,000, peaking at No. 5 and Platinum single for "A Night Like This" with sales exceeding 340,000), Poland (6× platinum with sales exceeding 60,000), Italy (Gold Single for "Back it Up"), and Austria (No. 1 with "A Night Like This"). In the UK, all six singles and the entire album were A-listed by BBC Radio 2. Over 1,400,000 albums have been sold in Europe.

The cinematic sound of the project resulted in frequent use in TV series, movies and advertising. Selected credits include The Playboy Club, a brand campaign by Martini, 2 Days in New York, The Secret Circle, Wind Mobile, Strictly Come Dancing, Dancing with the Stars, The Vampire Diaries, Agent Carter, Nestlé, Ferrero Rocher, Wrigley and Disney Nature film Chimpanzee.

Due to its exceptional success, the album was included in an episode of the Dutch version of Classic Albums in April 2012.

On New Year's Eve 2011, Caro appeared on Jools Holland's Hootenanny.

In January 2011, Emerald won the Popprijs 2010 for Best Dutch Pop Act of 2010. In early 2012, Emerald won a Goldene Kamera for Best Musik International and an Echo Award for Best Newcomer International.

=== 2013–2014: The Shocking Miss Emerald ===
In April 2013, the second Caro Emerald studio album The Shocking Miss Emerald was released. It included the singles "Tangled Up" and "Liquid Lunch". The album went to #1 in the UK album chart. She performed in the UK at The BBC Radio Theatre; it was broadcast on BBC Radio 2 and BBC Red Button.

On 29 June 2014, she played the opening music set on the pyramid stage at the Glastonbury Festival 2014.

=== 2015–2020: Emerald Island ===
In April 2015, Emerald released a single, "Quicksand".

In March 2017, Emerald released an exotica inspired EP, Emerald Island. It was released to accompany the Emerald Island Tour.

In June 2020, Emerald released "Wake Up Romeo," her first single in three years.

=== 2022–2025: The Jordan ===
On 23 August 2022, Van der Leeuw was revealed as the voice behind new act "The Jordan". Her debut album, Nowhere Near the Sky, was released on February 10, 2023 via Cooking Vinyl. The first three singles from the album are "You Don't Even Know Me", "Dancing Naked in the Sun", and "The Room". According to the official Caro Emerald website, "As of 2022, the Caro Emerald project and live act are dormant and no longer active."

=== 2026-present: Caro ===
On 18 February 2026 Van der Leeuw announced her return on her social media accounts and that she will release a new album. On 27 February 2026 she released the song "I Can't Win" under the name "Caro". Her YouTube account has been renamed from "The Jordan" to "Caro".

== Awards ==
- 11 April 2010: 3FM Serious Talent Award
- 15 April 2010: Schaal van Rigter
- 26 April 2010: De Eerste Prijs
- 3 October 2010: Edison Award, Best Female Singer
- MTV Europe Music Award, Best Dutch and Belgian Act
- 12 January 2011: European Border Breakers Award 2011
- 15 January 2011: 3FM Mega Award 2010
- 15 January 2011: Popprijs 2010
- 3 March 2011: Zilveren Harp 2010
- 3 March 2011: Het Beste Nederlandse lied 2010 (Best Song of the Year 2010)
- 14 March 2011: NPO 3FM, Best Album and Best Female Singer
- 12 June 2011: TMF Award for Best Female Singer
- 4 February 2012: Goldene Kamera 2012, Best Music International
- March 2012: Echo Music Prize, Best International Newcomer

== Discography ==
=== Studio albums ===
Title	Details	Peak chart positions											Certifications
Title	Details	NL	AUS	AUT	BEL (FLA)	FRA	GER	ITA	IRE	POL	SWI	UK	Certifications
Deleted Scenes from the Cutting Room Floor	Release date: 29 January 2010; Label: Grandmono	1	—	3	23	79	5	14	39	3	10	4	BPI: Platinum; BVMI: Platinum; IFPI SWI: Gold; NVPI: 6× Platinum; ZPAV: 3× Platinum
The Shocking Miss Emerald	Release date: 3 May 2013; Label: Grandmono	1	69	3	31	166	3	21	71	17	3	1	BPI: Gold; NVPI: Platinum
"—" denotes album that did not chart or was not released.

=== Live albums ===
Title	Details	Peak chart positions		
Title	Details	NL	AUT	POL
Live at the Heineken Music Hall (with the Grandmono Orchestra)	Release date: 20 May 2011; Label: Grandmono; Genre: Jazz, pop, hip hop	51	65	34

=== Extended plays ===
Title	Details	Peak chart positions
Title	Details	NL
Emerald Island	Release date: 6 March 2017; Label: Grandmono	40
MO x Caro Emerald By Grandmono	with Metropole Orkest; Release date: 4 December 2017; Label: Grandmono	52

=== Singles ===
List of singles as lead artist, with selected chart positions, showing year released and album name
Title	Year	Peak chart positions													Certifications	Album
Title	Year	NL	ITA	BEL	FRA	GER	AUT	POL	SK	ROM	SWI	UK	CZ	ZK	Certifications	Album
"Back It Up"	2009	13	11	33	—	70	—	—	53	—	—	190	—	—	ITA: Gold	Deleted Scenes from the Cutting Room Floor
"A Night Like This"	2009	1	10	52	—	4	1	2	—	1	9	65	—	—	ITA: Gold; SWI: Gold; GER: Platinum	Deleted Scenes from the Cutting Room Floor
"That Man"	2010	29	99	—	—	—	—	—	—	—	—	84	—	—		Deleted Scenes from the Cutting Room Floor
"Stuck"	2010	28	18	—	—	41	42	—	48	—	—	—	—	—	ITA: Gold	Deleted Scenes from the Cutting Room Floor
"Riviera Life"	2011	70	25	—	—	—	—	—	—	—	—	—	—	—		Deleted Scenes from the Cutting Room Floor
"You're All I Want For Christmas" (with Brook Benton)	2011	26	—	—	—	—	—	—	—	—	—	—	—	—		Non-album single
"Tangled Up"	2013	6	13	62	—	81	—	—	—	53	—	77	9	—	ITA: Gold	The Shocking Miss Emerald
"Liquid Lunch"	2013	—	—	64	182	—	—	—	—	—	—	70	—	89		The Shocking Miss Emerald
"One Day"	2013	—	—	75	—	—	—	—	—	—	—	—	—	152		The Shocking Miss Emerald
"I Belong to You"	2013	99	—	131	—	—	—	—	—	—	—	—	—	—		The Shocking Miss Emerald
"Ne Me Quitte Pas"	2014	—	—	—	—	—	—	—	—	—	—	—	—	—		Non-album single
"Coming Back as a Man"	2014	—	—	—	—	—	—	—	—	—	—	—	—	—		The Shocking Miss Emerald
"Quicksand"	2015	103	—	—	—	—	—	—	—	—	—	—	—	—		Non-album single
"Whatchugot"	2017	—	—	—	—	—	—	—	—	—	—	—	—	—		Emerald Island
"Wake Up Romeo"	2020	—	—	—	—	—	—	—	—	—	—	—	—	—		
"—" denotes single that did not chart or was not released.
