= Liquid Lunch =

Single by Caro Emerald

from the album The Shocking Miss Emerald
- Released: 21 May 2013
- Recorded: 2012
- Genre: Pop; jazz
- Length: 3:59
- Label: Grandmono
- Songwriters: Vincent DeGiorgio, Jan Van Wieringen, Robin Veldman, Wieger Hoogendorp, David Schreurs
- Producers: Jan Van Wieringen, David Schreurs

Caro Emerald singles chronology
"Tangled Up" (2013)	"Liquid Lunch" (2013)	"One Day" (2013)

"Liquid Lunch" is a song by Caro Emerald. The song was released as a digital download on 21 May 2013 as the second single from the album The Shocking Miss Emerald (2013). The song peaked at number 70 on the UK single chart, largely due to featuring in BBC Radio 2's Playlist 'A' List. The song was written by David Schreurs, Vincent DeGiorgio, Jan Van Wieringen, Robin Veldman, Wieger Hoogendorp.

== Music video ==
=== Lyrics video ===
A lyrics video to accompany the release of "Liquid Lunch" was first released onto YouTube on 27 May 2013 at a total length of four minutes and one second.

== Track listing ==
Digital download
No.	Title	Length
1.	"Liquid Lunch" (Radio Edit)	3:42
2.	"Liquid Lunch" (Radio Edit) (Instrumental)	3:42
3.	"Liquid Lunch"	3:59

== Chart performance ==
=== Weekly charts ===
Chart (2013)	Peak position
Belgium (Ultratip Bubbling Under Flanders)	14
Belgium (Ultratip Wollonia)	43
France (Les Charts)	182
Slovenia (SloTop50)	44
South Korea (Gaon Chart)	89
United Kingdom (Official Charts Company)	70

== Release history ==
Region	Date	Format	Label
Netherlands	21 May 2013	Digital download	Grandmono Records
United Kingdom	3 June 2013	Digital download	Grandmono Records
