= Stuck (Caro Emerald song) =

Single by Caro Emerald

from the album Deleted Scenes from the Cutting Room Floor
- Released: 15 October 2010 (The Netherlands)
- Genre: Pop
- Length: 3:51
- Label: Grandmono
- Songwriters: Vince DeGiorgio, David Schreurs
- Producers: David Schreurs, Jan Van Wieringen

Caro Emerald singles chronology
"That Man" (2010)	"Stuck" (2010)	"Riviera Life" (2011)

"Stuck" is the fourth single by Caro Emerald taken from the album Deleted Scenes from the Cutting Room Floor. It was released on 15 October 2010 as a Digital download in the Netherlands. The single was certified gold by the Federation of the Italian Music Industry, denoting digital sales in excess of 15,000 copies in Italy.

== Music video ==
A music video to accompany the release of "Stuck" was first released onto YouTube on 26 October 2010.

== Track listing ==
Stuck – EP

1. "Stuck" (Radio Mix) – 3:51
2. "Stuck" (KiNK Remix) – 6:15
3. "Stuck" (KiNK Remix) [Radio Edit] – 3:54
4. "Stuck" (Radio Mix) [Instrumental] – 3:52
5. "Stuck" (Radio Mix) [Acapella] - 3:25

Stuck Deluxe - EP

1. "Stuck" (Radio Mix) - 3:52
2. "Stuck" - 4:29
3. "Stuck" (Live @ Edison Awards 2010) - 3:9
4. "Stuck" (Live @ North Sea Jazz 2010) - 7:04
5. "Stuck" (KiNK Mix) [Radio Edit] - 3:55
6. "Stuck" (KiNK Mix) [Original] - 6:17

== Chart performance ==
=== Weekly charts ===
Weekly chart performance for "Stuck"
Chart (2010–11)	Peak position
Austria (Ö3 Austria Top 40)	42
Germany (GfK)	41
Italy (FIMI)	18
Netherlands (Dutch Top 40)	6
Netherlands (Single Top 100)	28

=== Year-end charts ===
Annual chart rankings for "Stuck"
Chart (2011)	Position
Italy (Musica e dischi)	89
Netherlands (Dutch Top 40)	44

== Certifications ==
Certifications and sales for "Stuck"
Region	Certification	Certified units/sales
Italy (FIMI)	Gold	15,000^{*}
^{*} Sales figures based on certification alone.

== Release history ==
Street dates for "Stuck"
Country	Date	Format	Label
Netherlands	15 October 2010	Digital download	Grandmono Records
