= List of UK R&B Singles Chart number ones of 2013 =

The logo of the Official Charts Company, responsible for compiling all of the official music charts in the United Kingdom, including the R&B singles chart.

The UK R&B Chart is a weekly chart that ranks the 40 biggest-selling singles and albums that are classified in the R&B genre in the United Kingdom. The chart is compiled by the Official Charts Company, and is based on both physical and digital sales. The following are the number-one singles of 2013.

== Number-one singles ==
Key
†	Best-selling R&B single of the year

Issue date (week ending)	Single	Artist(s)	Ref.
5 January	"Scream & Shout"	will.i.am featuring Britney Spears	
12 January	"Scream & Shout"	will.i.am featuring Britney Spears	
19 January ^{[a]}	"Scream & Shout"	will.i.am featuring Britney Spears	
26 January ^{[a]}	"Scream & Shout"	will.i.am featuring Britney Spears	
2 February	"Scream & Shout"	will.i.am featuring Britney Spears	
9 February	"Thrift Shop" †	Macklemore & Ryan Lewis featuring Wanz	
16 February ^{[a]}	"Thrift Shop" †	Macklemore & Ryan Lewis featuring Wanz	
23 February	"Thrift Shop" †	Macklemore & Ryan Lewis featuring Wanz	
2 March	"Thrift Shop" †	Macklemore & Ryan Lewis featuring Wanz	
9 March ^{[a]}	"Mirrors"	Justin Timberlake	
16 March ^{[a]}	"Mirrors"	Justin Timberlake	
23 March ^{[a]}	"Mirrors"	Justin Timberlake	
30 March ^{[b]}	"Mirrors"	Justin Timberlake	
6 April ^{[b]}	"Mirrors"	Justin Timberlake	
13 April ^{[b]}	"Mirrors"	Justin Timberlake	
20 April ^{[b]}	"Mirrors"	Justin Timberlake	
27 April	"#thatPOWER"	will.i.am featuring Justin Bieber	
4 May	"#thatPOWER"	will.i.am featuring Justin Bieber	
11 May	"Can't Hold Us"	Macklemore & Ryan Lewis featuring Ray Dalton	
18 May	"Can't Hold Us"	Macklemore & Ryan Lewis featuring Ray Dalton	
25 May ^{[b]}	"Can't Hold Us"	Macklemore & Ryan Lewis featuring Ray Dalton	
1 June ^{[b]}	"Can't Hold Us"	Macklemore & Ryan Lewis featuring Ray Dalton	
8 June ^{[b]}	"Can't Hold Us"	Macklemore & Ryan Lewis featuring Ray Dalton	
15 June ^{[b]}	"Can't Hold Us"	Macklemore & Ryan Lewis featuring Ray Dalton	
22 June	"I Will Survive"	Leah McFall	
29 June	"The Other Side"	Jason Derulo	
6 July	"Bang Bang"	will.i.am	
13 July	"Bang Bang"	will.i.am	
20 July	"Bang Bang"	will.i.am	
27 July	"Bang Bang"	will.i.am	
3 August	"Bang Bang"	will.i.am	
10 August	"Bang Bang"	will.i.am	
17 August ^{[b]}	"Holy Grail"	Jay-Z featuring Justin Timberlake	
24 August ^{[b]}	"Holy Grail"	Jay-Z featuring Justin Timberlake	
31 August	"Other Side of Love"	Sean Paul	
7 September	"Lost Generation"	Rizzle Kicks	
14 September	"Lost Generation"	Rizzle Kicks	
21 September	"Same Love"	Macklemore & Ryan Lewis featuring Mary Lambert	
28 September ^{[a]}	"Talk Dirty"	Jason Derulo featuring 2 Chainz	
5 October ^{[a]}	"Talk Dirty"	Jason Derulo featuring 2 Chainz	
12 October	"Talk Dirty"	Jason Derulo featuring 2 Chainz	
19 October	"Berzerk"	Eminem	
26 October	"Rap God"	Eminem	
2 November	"Talk Dirty"	Jason Derulo featuring 2 Chainz	
9 November ^{[a]}	"The Monster"	Eminem featuring Rihanna	
16 November ^{[b]}	"The Monster"	Eminem featuring Rihanna	
23 November ^{[b]}	"The Monster"	Eminem featuring Rihanna	
30 November ^{[b]}	"The Monster"	Eminem featuring Rihanna	
7 December ^{[b]}	"The Monster"	Eminem featuring Rihanna	
14 December ^{[b]}	"The Monster"	Eminem featuring Rihanna	
21 December	"Trumpets"	Jason Derulo	
28 December	"Trumpets"	Jason Derulo	

== Notes ==
- ^{a} – The album was simultaneously number-one on the UK Singles Chart.
- ^{b} – The artist was simultaneously number-one on the R&B albums chart.

== See also ==
- List of UK Singles Chart number ones of 2013
- List of UK R&B Albums Chart number ones of 2013
