= List of UK R&B Albums Chart number ones of 2013 =

The logo of the Official Charts Company, responsible for compiling all of the official music charts in the United Kingdom, including the R&B albums chart.

The UK R&B Chart is a weekly chart, first introduced in October 1994, that ranks the 40 biggest-selling singles and albums that are classified in the R&B genre in the United Kingdom. The chart is compiled by the Official Charts Company, and is based on sales of CDs, downloads, vinyl and other formats over the previous seven days.

The following are the number-one albums of 2013.

== Number-one albums ==
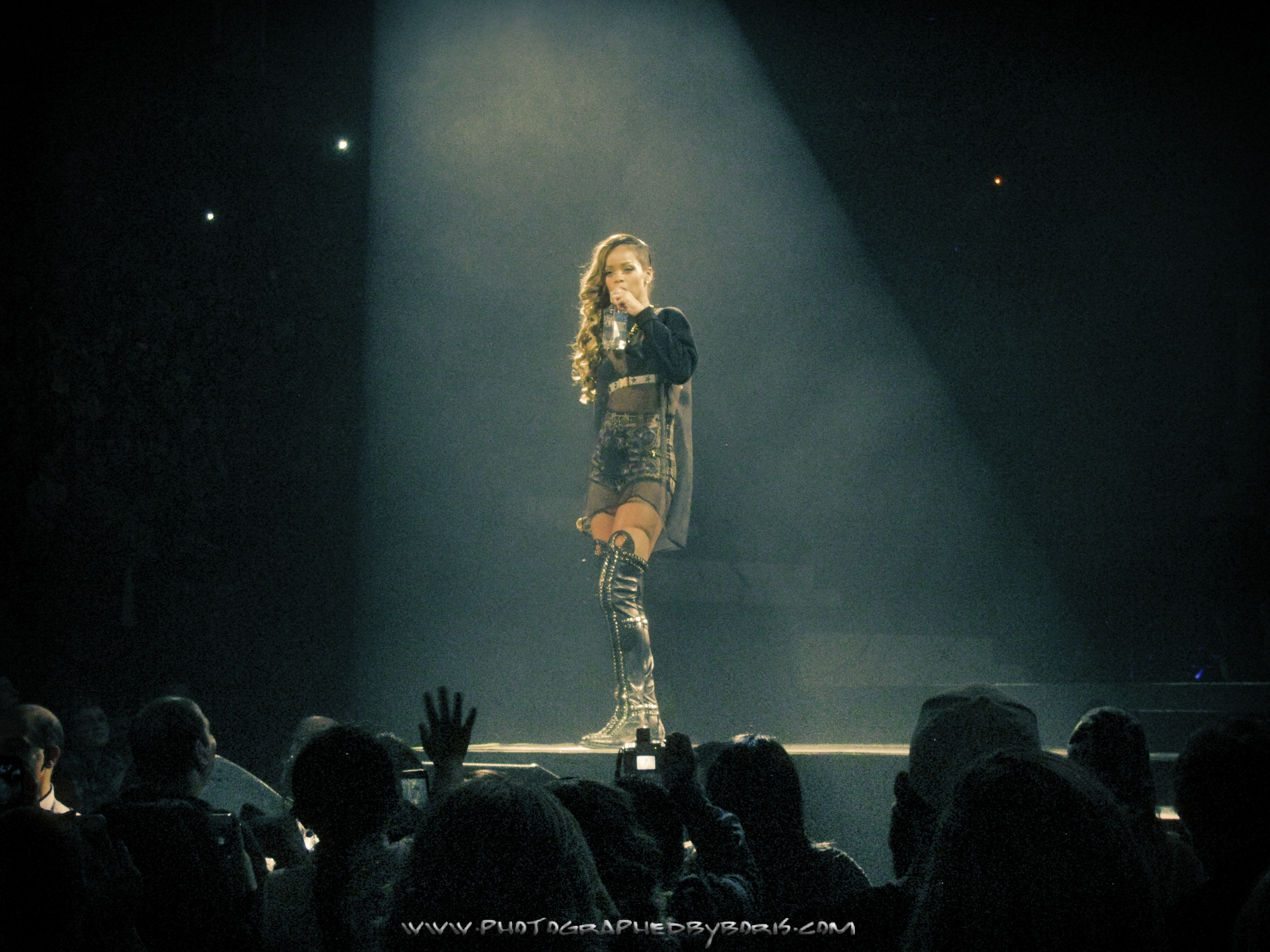
Unapologetic reaching number one at the beginning of the year marks the fourth consecutive calendar year that Rihanna has topped the UK R&B albums chart. Its eight weeks at number one also makes it the longest running number-one album of the 2013 chart.

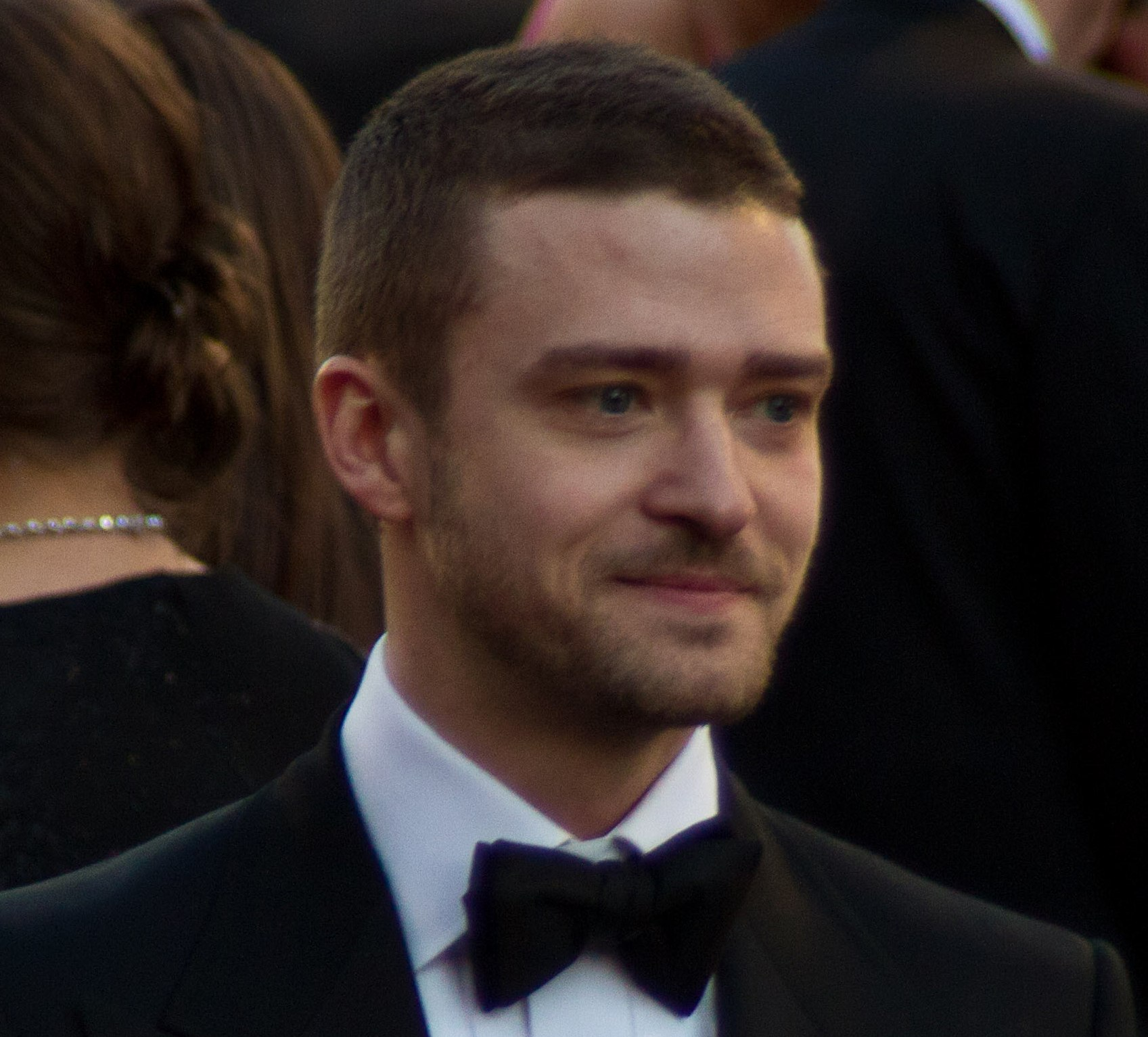
Justin Timberlake became the first male in the history of the chart to have two number-one albums in a calendar year, when The 20/20 Experience and The 20/20 Experience - 2 of 2 reached the top spot in May and October respectively.

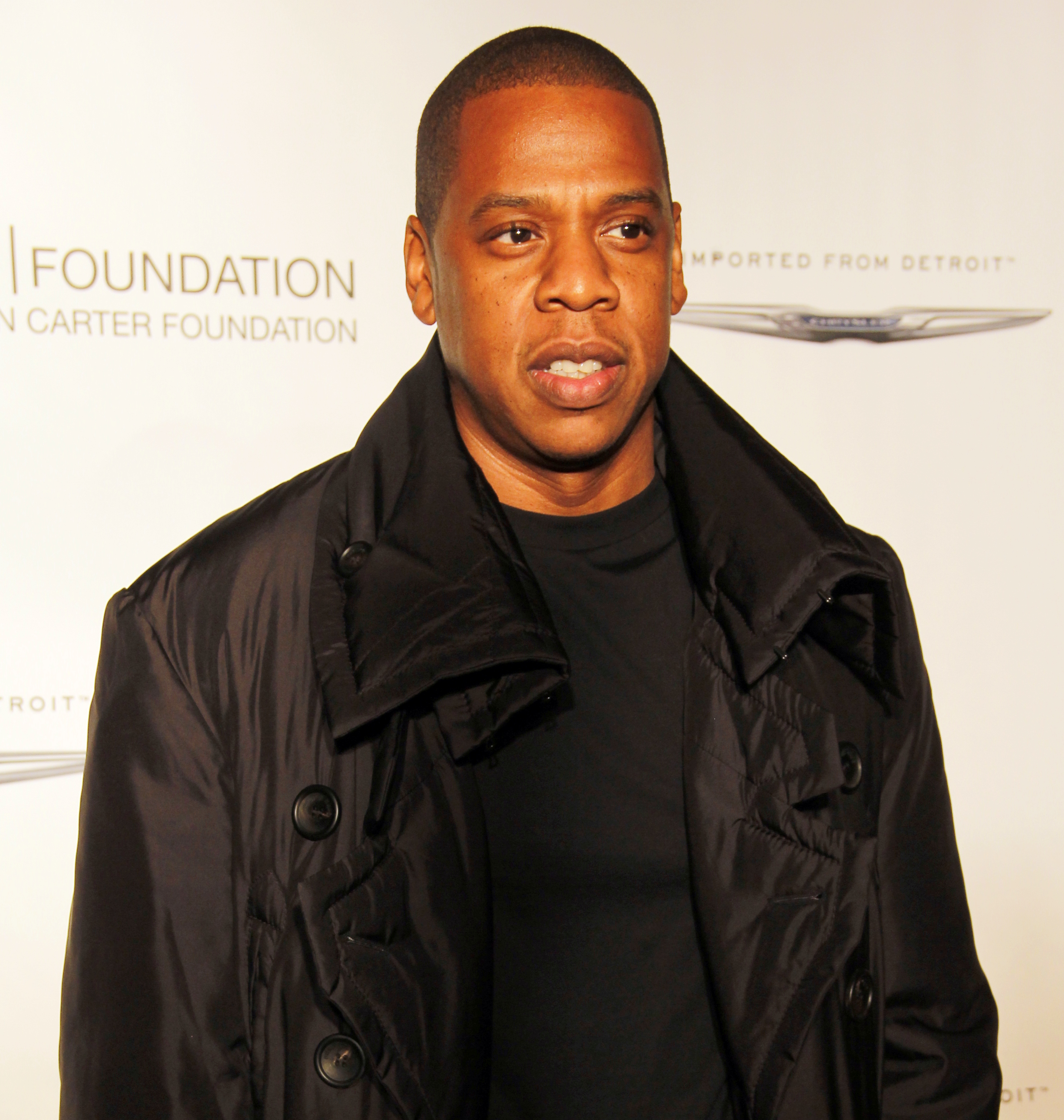
The seven weeks Magna Carta... Holy Grail by Jay-Z spent at the top of the chart in 2013 makes it the longest running male number-one album of the year.

Issue date	Album	Artist(s)	Record label	Ref.
5 January	Unapologetic	Rihanna	Def Jam/SRP	
12 January	Unapologetic	Rihanna	Def Jam/SRP	
19 January	Unapologetic	Rihanna	Def Jam/SRP	
26 January	Long. Live. ASAP	ASAP Rocky	ASAP Worldwide/Polo Grounds/RCA	
2 February	Unapologetic	Rihanna	Def Jam/SRP	
9 February	Unapologetic	Rihanna	Def Jam/SRP	
16 February	Unapologetic	Rihanna	Def Jam/SRP	
23 February	Unapologetic	Rihanna	Def Jam/SRP	
2 March	channel ORANGE	Frank Ocean	Def Jam	
9 March	channel ORANGE	Frank Ocean	Def Jam	
16 March	Sing to the Moon	Laura Mvula	RCA	
23 March	Sing to the Moon	Laura Mvula	RCA	
30 March ^{[a]}^{[b]}	The 20/20 Experience	Justin Timberlake	RCA	
6 April ^{[a]}^{[b]}	The 20/20 Experience	Justin Timberlake	RCA	
13 April ^{[a]}^{[b]}	The 20/20 Experience	Justin Timberlake	RCA	
20 April ^{[b]}	The 20/20 Experience	Justin Timberlake	RCA	
27 April	The 20/20 Experience	Justin Timberlake	RCA	
4 May ^{[b]}	#willpower	will.i.am	will.i.am/Interscope	
11 May	#willpower	will.i.am	will.i.am/Interscope	
18 May	The 20/20 Experience	Justin Timberlake	RCA	
25 May ^{[b]}	The Heist	Macklemore and Ryan Lewis	Macklemore LLC	
1 June ^{[b]}	The Heist	Macklemore and Ryan Lewis	Macklemore LLC	
8 June ^{[b]}	The Heist	Macklemore and Ryan Lewis	Macklemore LLC	
15 June ^{[b]}	The Heist	Macklemore and Ryan Lewis	Macklemore LLC	
22 June	Unapologetic	Rihanna	Def Jam/SRP	
29 June ^{[a]}	Yeezus	Kanye West	Def Jam	
6 July	Yeezus	Kanye West	Def Jam	
13 July	Yeezus	Kanye West	Def Jam	
20 July ^{[a]}	Magna Carta... Holy Grail	Jay-Z	Roc-A-Fella/Roc Nation/Universal	
27 July	Magna Carta... Holy Grail	Jay-Z	Roc-A-Fella/Roc Nation/Universal	
3 August	Magna Carta... Holy Grail	Jay-Z	Roc-A-Fella/Roc Nation/Universal	
10 August	Magna Carta... Holy Grail	Jay-Z	Roc-A-Fella/Roc Nation/Universal	
17 August ^{[b]}	Magna Carta... Holy Grail	Jay-Z	Roc-A-Fella/Roc Nation/Universal	
24 August ^{[b]}	Magna Carta... Holy Grail	Jay-Z	Roc-A-Fella/Roc Nation/Universal	
31 August	Doris	Earl Sweatshirt	Tan Cressida/Columbia	
7 September	Magna Carta... Holy Grail	Jay-Z	Roc-A-Fella/Roc Nation/Universal	
14 September ^{[b]}	Roaring 20s	Rizzle Kicks	Island	
21 September	Kiss Land	The Weeknd	Republic	
28 September	The Heist	Macklemore and Ryan Lewis	Macklemore LLC	
5 October	Nothing Was the Same	Drake	Young Money/Cash Money/Republic	
12 October	The 20/20 Experience - 2 of 2	Justin Timberlake	RCA	
19 October	Nothing Was the Same	Drake	Young Money/Cash Money/Republic	
26 October	Nothing Was the Same	Drake	Young Money/Cash Money/Republic	
2 November	Nothing Was the Same	Drake	Young Money/Cash Money/Republic	
9 November	Nothing Was the Same	Drake	Young Money/Cash Money/Republic	
16 November ^{[a]}^{[b]}	The Marshall Mathers LP 2	Eminem	Aftermath/Shady/Interscope	
23 November ^{[b]}	The Marshall Mathers LP 2	Eminem	Aftermath/Shady/Interscope	
30 November ^{[b]}	The Marshall Mathers LP 2	Eminem	Aftermath/Shady/Interscope	
7 December ^{[b]}	The Marshall Mathers LP 2	Eminem	Aftermath/Shady/Interscope	
14 December ^{[b]}	The Marshall Mathers LP 2	Eminem	Aftermath/Shady/Interscope	
21 December	The Marshall Mathers LP 2	Eminem	Aftermath/Shady/Interscope	
28 December	Beyoncé	Beyoncé	Parkwood/Columbia	

== Notes ==
- ^{a} - The album was simultaneously number-one on the UK albums chart.
- ^{b} - The artist was simultaneously number-one on the R&B singles chart.

== See also ==
- List of UK Albums Chart number ones of 2013
- List of UK R&B Chart number-one singles of 2013
