= List of UK Rock & Metal Albums Chart number ones of 2013 =

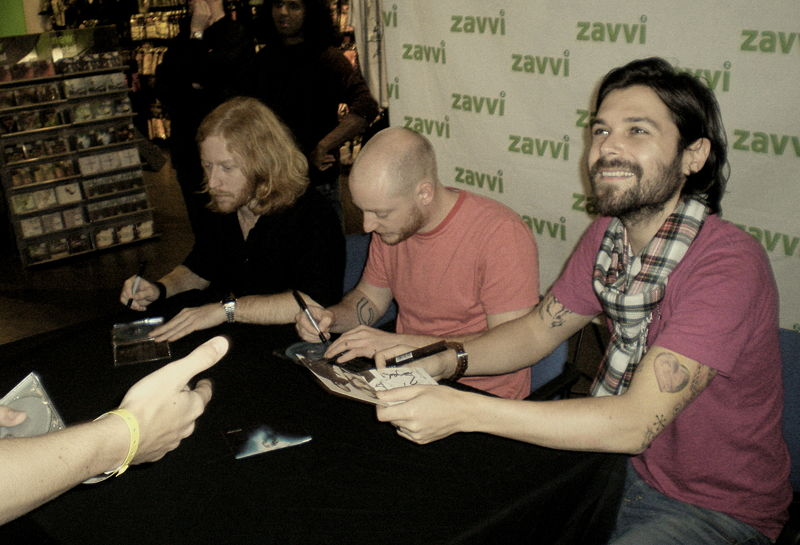
Biffy Clyro's sixth studio album Opposites spent six weeks at number one in 2013 and was the best-selling rock and metal album of the year in the UK.

The UK Rock & Metal Albums Chart is a record chart which ranks the best-selling rock and heavy metal albums in the United Kingdom. Compiled and published by the Official Charts Company, the data is based on each album's weekly physical sales, digital downloads and streams. In 2013, there were 29 albums that topped the 52 published charts. The first number-one album of the year was Muse's sixth studio album The 2nd Law, which was released the previous year. The first new number-one album of the year was Wretched and Divine: The Story of the Wild Ones, the third studio album by Black Veil Brides. Muse also had the final number-one UK Rock & Metal Albums Chart number one of the year with the live album Live at Rome Olympic Stadium, which spent three weeks at number one in December.

The most successful albums on the UK Rock & Metal Albums Chart in 2013 were Biffy Clyro's sixth studio album Opposites and the self-titled fourth studio album by Paramore, both of which spent a total of six weeks at number one during the year. Opposites was the best-selling rock and metal album of the year, ranking 35th in the UK End of Year Albums Chart, while Paramore ranked 76th. Queens of the Stone Age's sixth studio album ...Like Clockwork spent four weeks at number one, while four albums – Black Sabbath's 13, the Teenage Dirtbags compilation, Pearl Jam's Lightning Bolt and Muse's Live at Rome Olympic Stadium – were number one for three weeks in 2013. Two further albums – Muse's The 2nd Law and the Nickelback compilation The Best of Nickelback Volume 1 – each spent two weeks at number one in 2013.

== Chart history ==
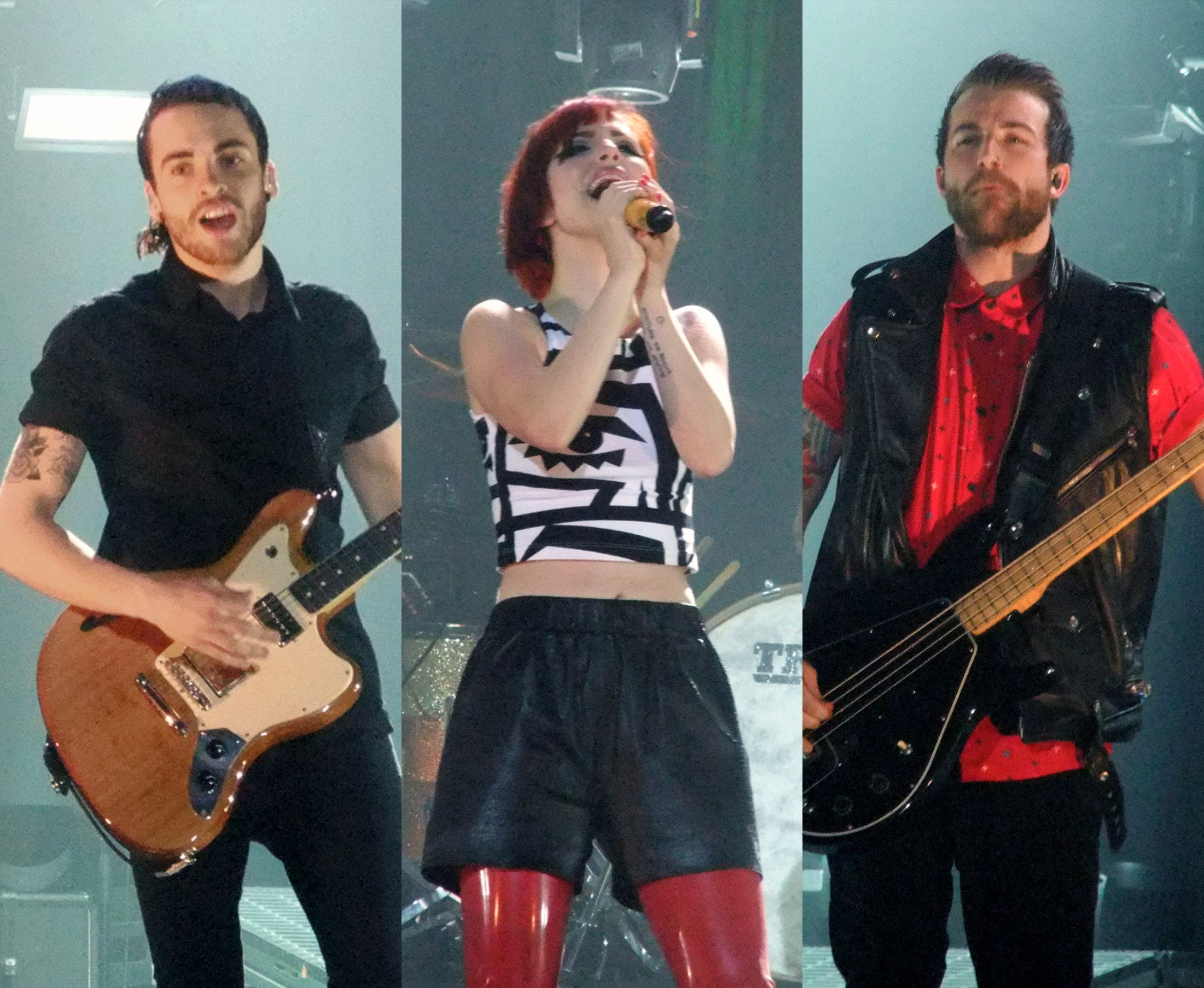
Paramore's self-titled fourth studio album spent six weeks at number one in 2013, over three separate spells.

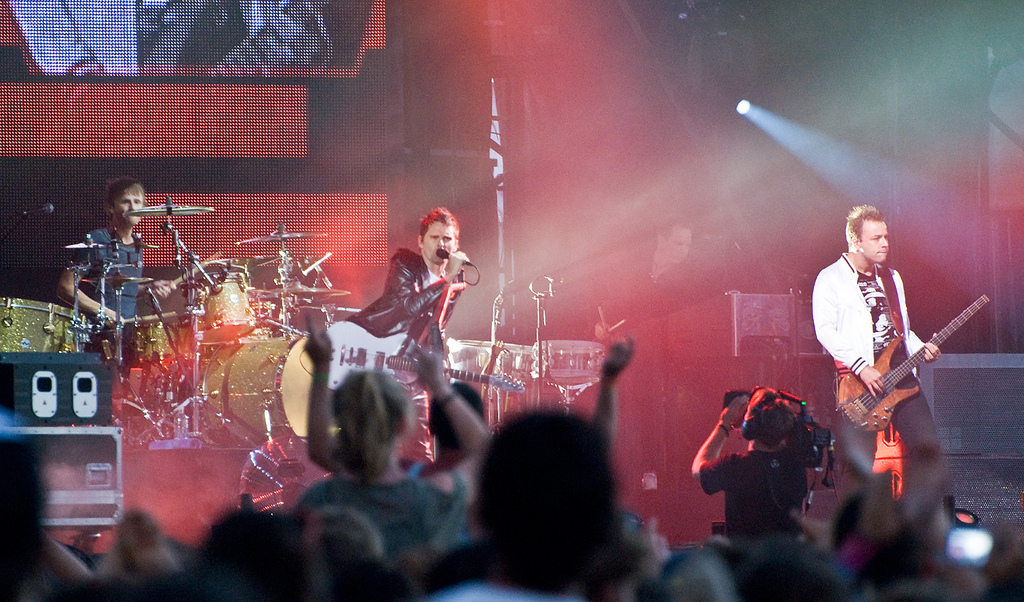
Muse spent a total of five weeks at number one on the UK Rock & Metal Albums Chart in 2013: The 2nd Law, released in 2012, spent the first two weeks of the year atop the chart, while the live album Live at Rome Olympic Stadium was number one for the last three weeks.

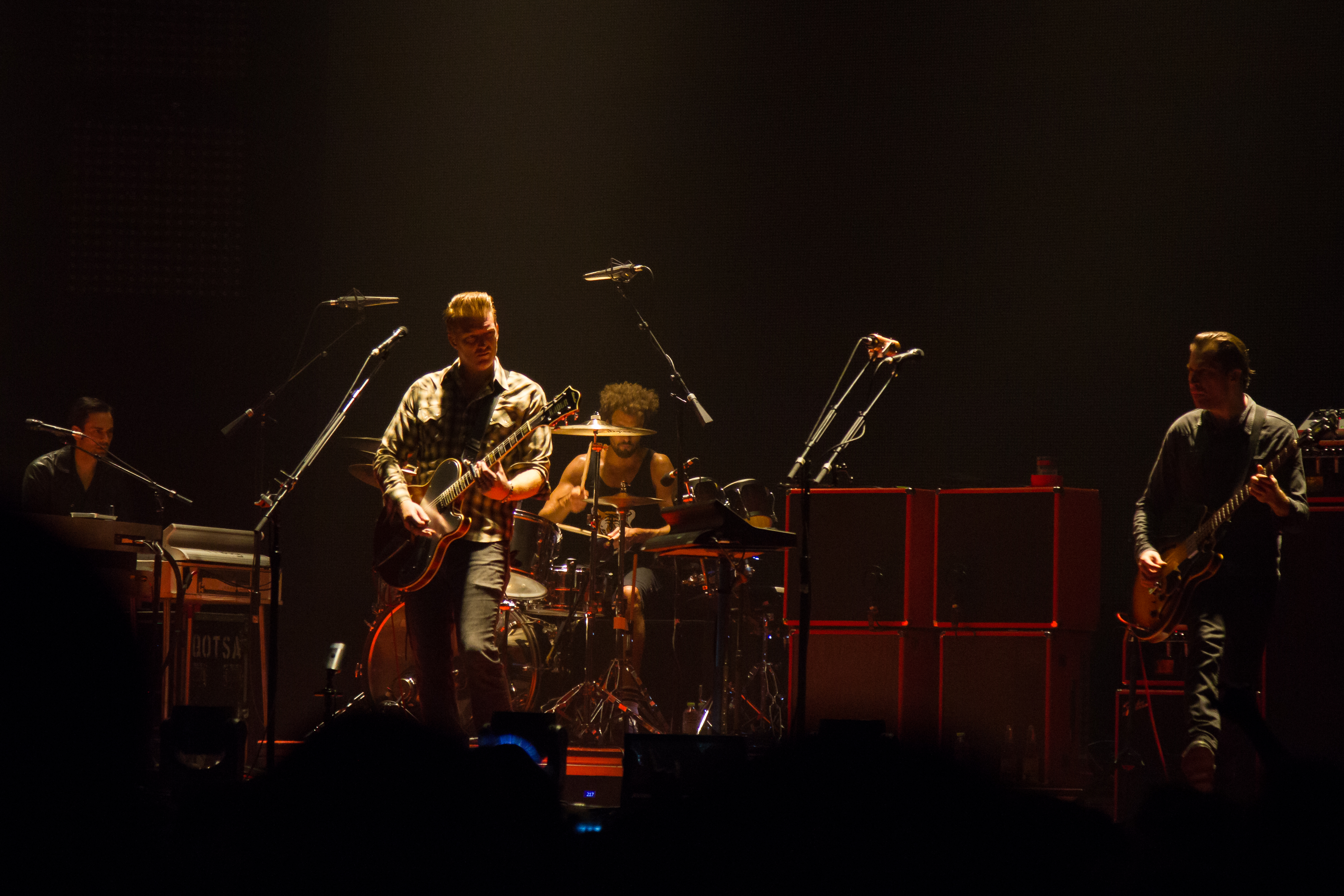
...Like Clockwork, the sixth studio album by Queens of the Stone Age, spent four weeks at number one in 2013.

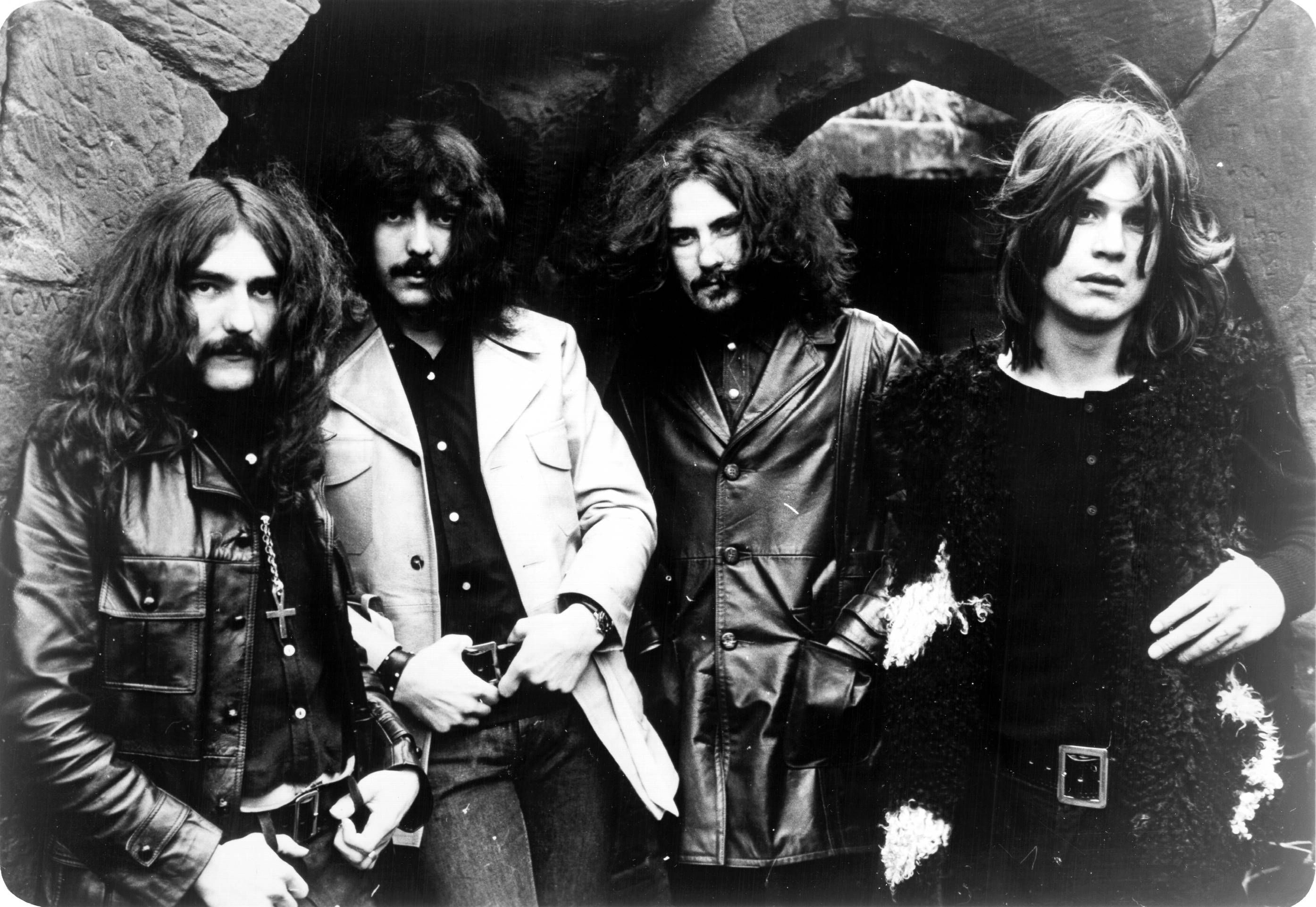
Black Sabbath topped the UK Rock & Metal Albums Chart for three consecutive weeks in mid-2013 with 13.

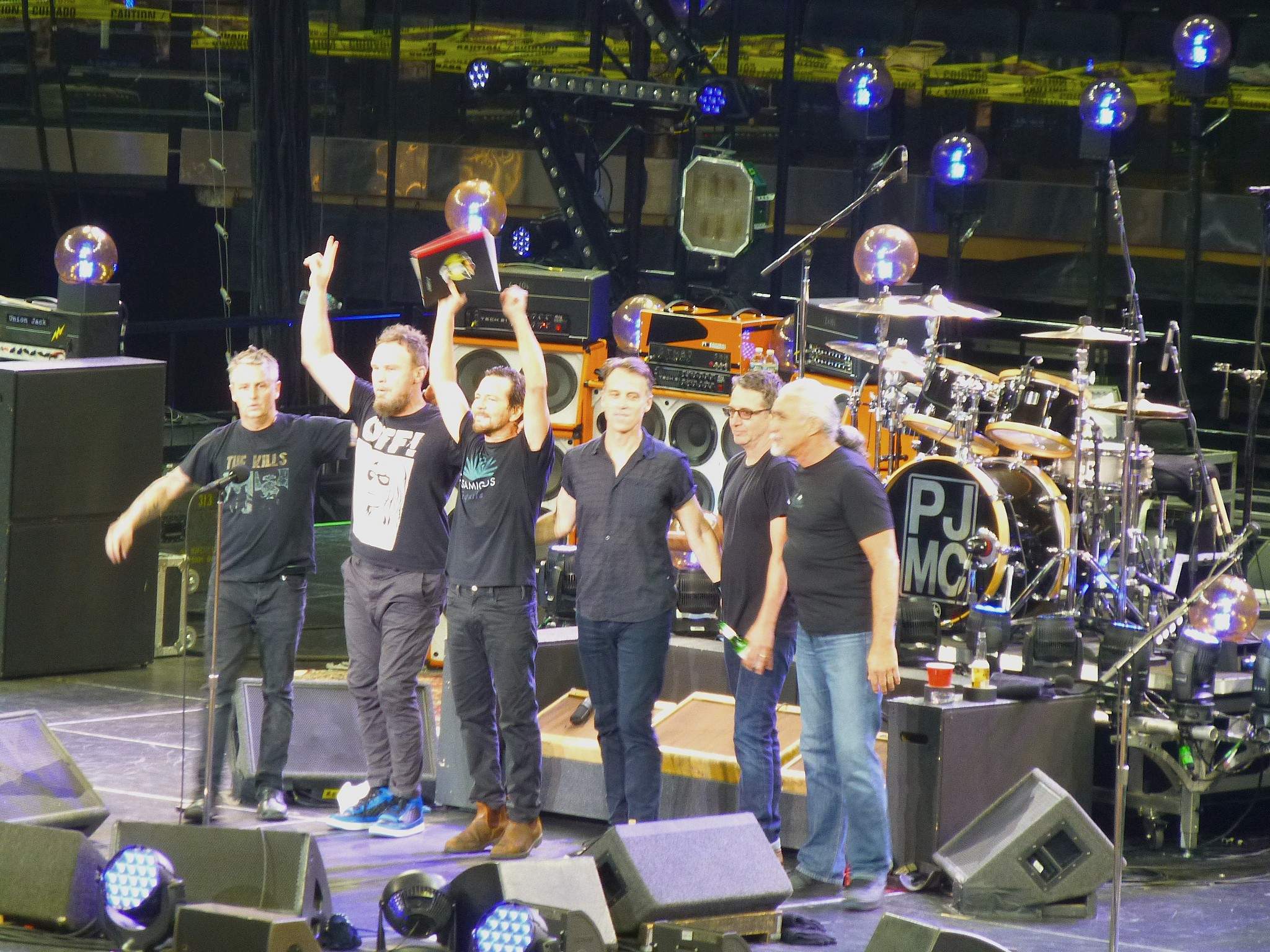
Pearl Jam registered their fourth number one on the UK Rock & Metal Albums Chart with Lightning Bolt.

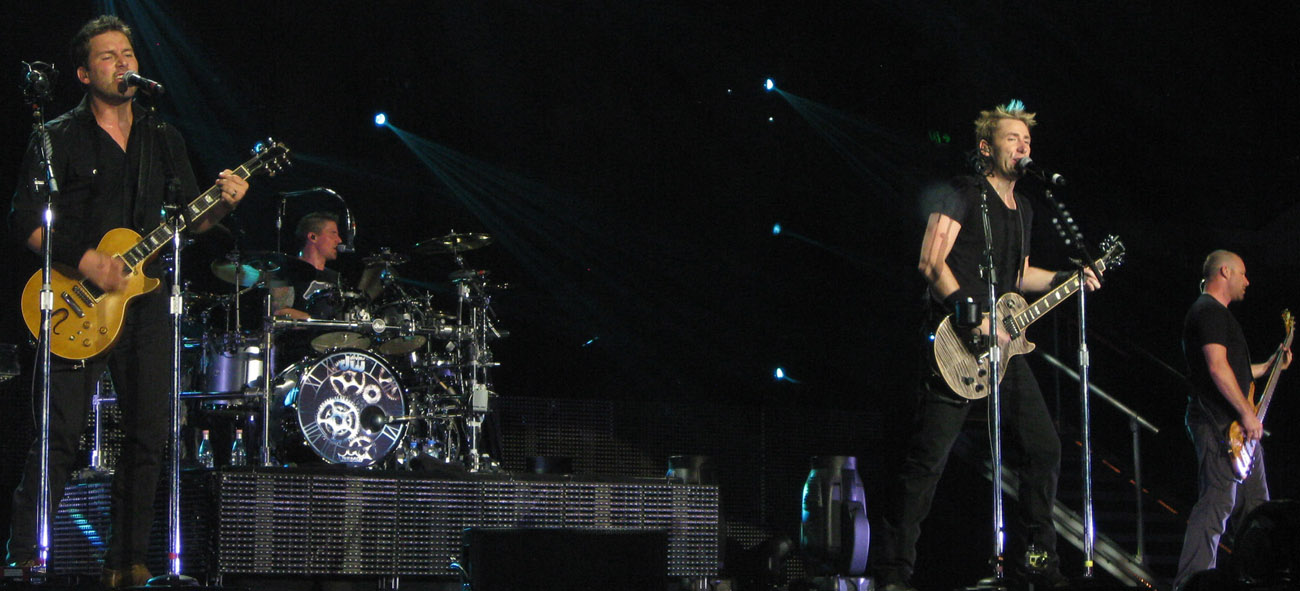
The Best of Nickelback Volume 1 spent two weeks at number one in 2013.

Key
†	Indicates best-selling rock album of 2013

Issue date	Album	Artist(s)	Record label(s)	Ref.
5 January	The 2nd Law	Muse	Helium 3/Warner Bros.	
12 January	The 2nd Law	Muse	Helium 3/Warner Bros.	
19 January	Wretched and Divine: The Story of the Wild Ones	Black Veil Brides	Island	
26 January	Greatest Hits	Foo Fighters	RCA	
2 February	Signals	Mallory Knox	A Wolf at Your Door	
9 February	Opposites †	Biffy Clyro	14th Floor	
16 February	Opposites †	Biffy Clyro	14th Floor	
23 February	Temper Temper	Bullet for My Valentine	RCA	
2 March	Opposites †	Biffy Clyro	14th Floor	
9 March	The Raven That Refused to Sing (And Other Stories)	Steven Wilson	Kscope	
16 March	Opposites †	Biffy Clyro	14th Floor	
23 March	Sound City: Real to Reel	Various artists	Columbia	
30 March	Opposites†	Biffy Clyro	14th Floor	
6 April	Opposites†	Biffy Clyro	14th Floor	
13 April	Sempiternal	Bring Me the Horizon	RCA	
20 April	Paramore	Paramore	Atlantic/Fueled by Ramen	
27 April	Paramore	Paramore	Atlantic/Fueled by Ramen	
4 May	Paramore	Paramore	Atlantic/Fueled by Ramen	
11 May	Now What?!	Deep Purple	earMusic	
18 May	Paramore	Paramore	Atlantic/Fueled by Ramen	
25 May	Paramore	Paramore	Atlantic/Fueled by Ramen	
1 June	Love, Lust, Faith and Dreams	Thirty Seconds to Mars	Polydor	
8 June	The Devil Put Dinosaurs Here	Alice in Chains	Virgin	
15 June	...Like Clockwork	Queens of the Stone Age	Matador	
22 June	13	Black Sabbath	Vertigo	
29 June	13	Black Sabbath	Vertigo	
6 July	13	Black Sabbath	Vertigo	
13 July	...Like Clockwork	Queens of the Stone Age	Matador	
20 July	...Like Clockwork	Queens of the Stone Age	Matador	
27 July	...Like Clockwork	Queens of the Stone Age	Matador	
3 August	Hey! Hello!	Hey! Hello!	Round	
10 August	The Wrong Side of Heaven and the Righteous Side of Hell, Volume 1	Five Finger Death Punch	Eleven Seven	
17 August	From Death to Destiny	Asking Alexandria	Sumerian	
24 August	Paramore	Paramore	Atlantic/Fueled by Ramen	
31 August	Teenage Dirtbags	Various artists	Universal Music TV	
7 September	Hail to the King	Avenged Sevenfold	Warner Bros.	
14 September	Teenage Dirtbags	Various artists	Universal Music TV	
21 September	Teenage Dirtbags	Various artists	Universal Music TV	
28 September	Old Souls	Deaf Havana	BMG	
5 October	Dream Theater	Dream Theater	Roadrunner	
12 October	Fortress	Alter Bridge	Roadrunner	
19 October	The Paradigm Shift	Korn	Spinefarm	
26 October	Lightning Bolt	Pearl Jam	EMI	
2 November	Lightning Bolt	Pearl Jam	EMI	
9 November	Lightning Bolt	Pearl Jam	EMI	
16 November	The Best of Nickelback Volume 1	Nickelback	Roadrunner	
23 November	The Best of Nickelback Volume 1	Nickelback	Roadrunner	
30 November	The Wrong Side of Heaven and the Righteous Side of Hell, Volume 2	Five Finger Death Punch	Eleven Seven	
7 December	Common Courtesy	A Day to Remember	ADTR	
14 December	Live at Rome Olympic Stadium	Muse	Helium 3/Warner Bros.	
21 December	Live at Rome Olympic Stadium	Muse	Helium 3/Warner Bros.	
28 December	Live at Rome Olympic Stadium	Muse	Helium 3/Warner Bros.	

== See also ==
- 2013 in British music
- List of UK Rock & Metal Singles Chart number ones of 2013
