= List of UK Rock & Metal Albums Chart number ones of 2011 =

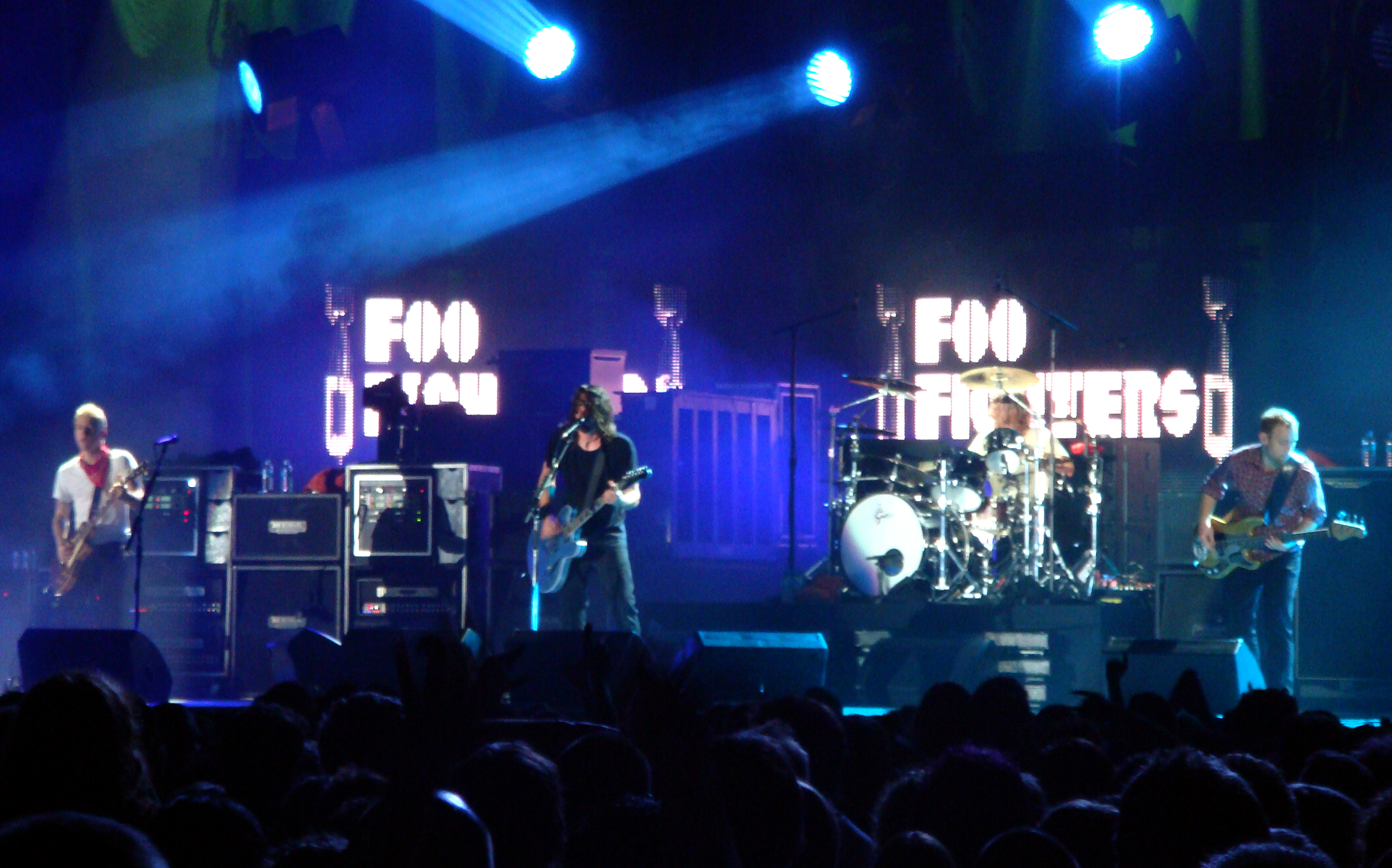
Foo Fighters spent a total of 18 weeks at number one on the UK Rock & Metal Albums Chart in 2011. The band's seventh studio album Wasting Light spent 13 weeks at number one and was the best-selling rock and metal album of the year.

The UK Rock & Metal Albums Chart is a record chart which ranks the best-selling rock and heavy metal albums in the United Kingdom. Compiled and published by the Official Charts Company, the data is based on each album's weekly physical sales, digital downloads and streams. In 2011, there were 25 albums that topped the 52 published charts. The first number-one album of the year was the Led Zeppelin compilation Mothership, which was released in 2007. The first new number-one album of the year was The Wörld Is Yours, the twentieth studio album by Motörhead. The final number-one album of the year was Here and Now, the seventh studio album by Canadian band Nickelback, which reached number one for the week ending 3 December and remained there for five consecutive weeks until the end of the year.

The most successful album on the UK Rock & Metal Albums Chart in 2011 was Wasting Light, the seventh studio album by American alternative rock band Foo Fighters, which spent a total of 13 weeks at number one. This included a single run of seven consecutive weeks from 23 April to 4 June and another four-week stint between 16 July and 6 August. Wasting Light was the best-selling rock and metal release of the year, ranking 24th in the UK End of Year Albums Chart. Linkin Park's fourth studio album A Thousand Suns, the 2009 Foo Fighters Greatest Hits compilation and Nickelback's Here and Now each spent five weeks at number one, while the self-titled third studio album by Evanescence was number one for four weeks in 2011. One album, Mothership by Led Zeppelin, spent two weeks at number one on the chart in 2011.

== Chart history ==
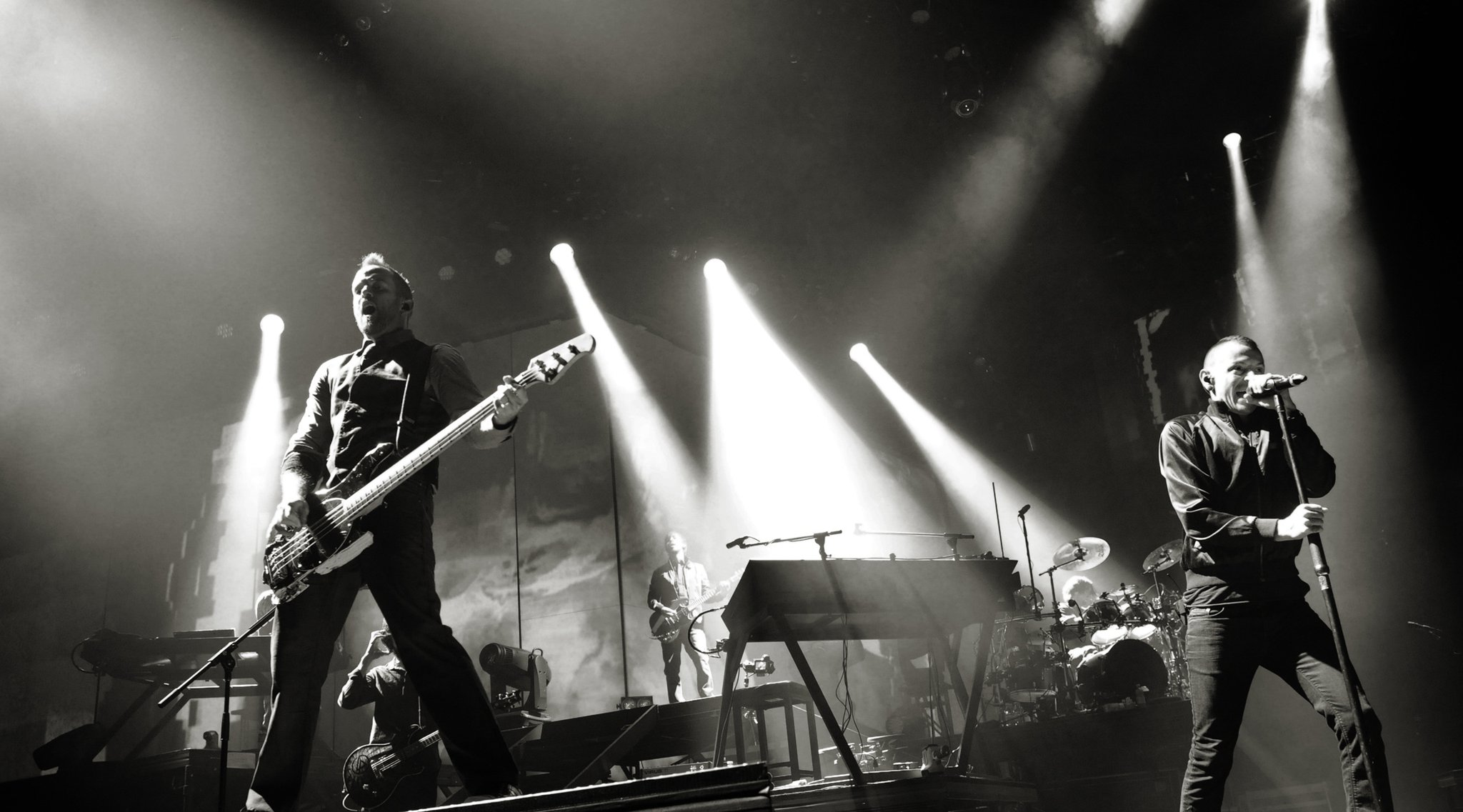
Linkin Park spent five weeks at number one across two spells in 2011 with their fourth studio album A Thousand Suns.

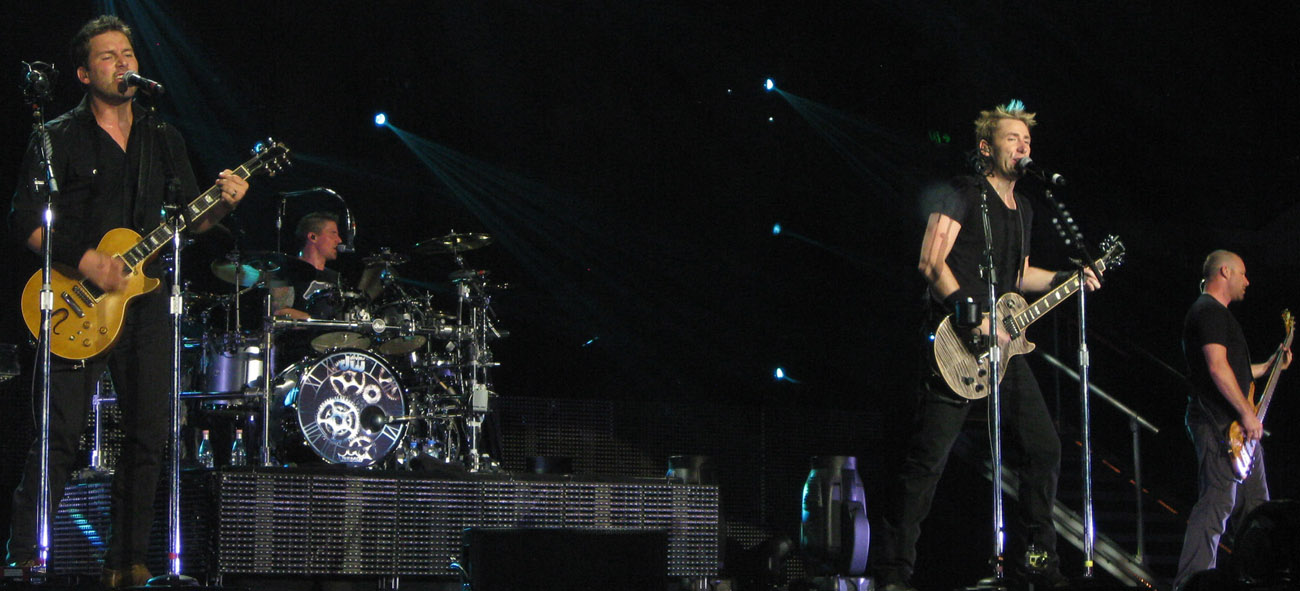
Nickelback's seventh studio album Here and Now spent the last five weeks of the year at number one.

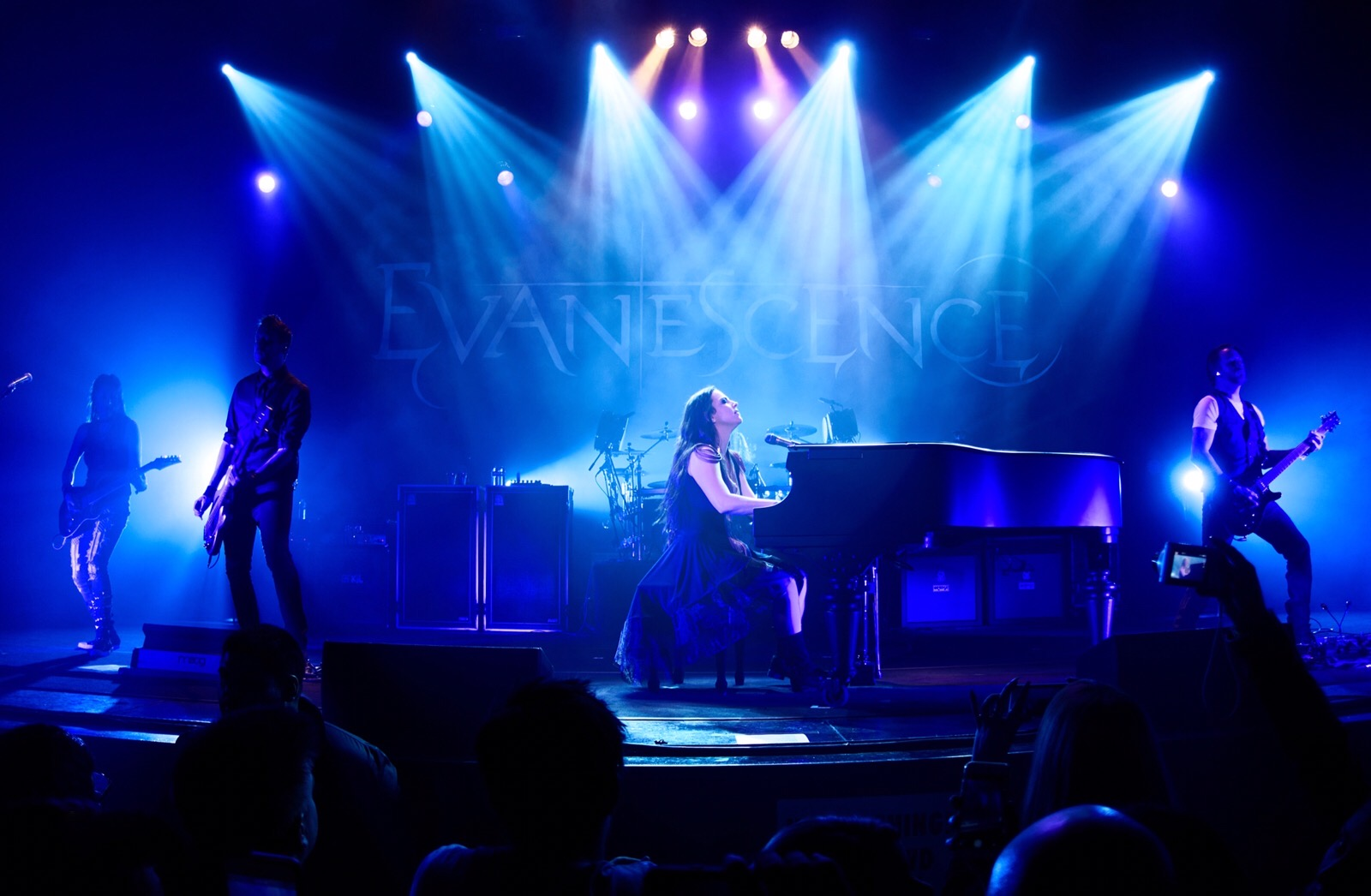
Evanescence topped the UK Rock & Metal Albums Chart for four weeks in 2011 with their self-titled third studio album.

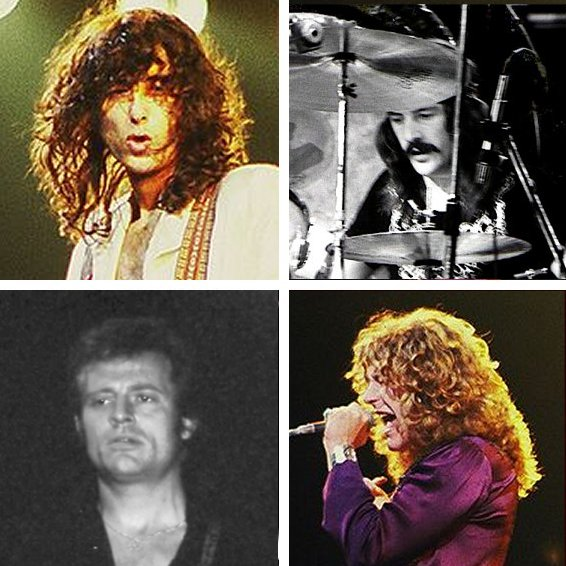
Led Zeppelin's Mothership was number one on the chart for two weeks in 2011.

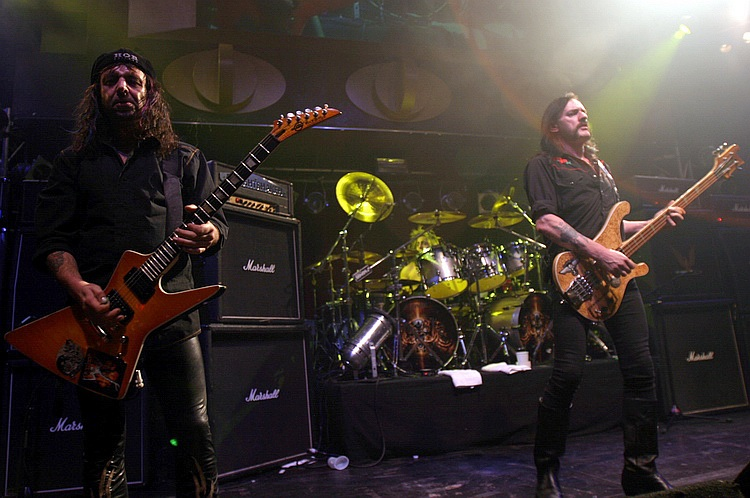
Motörhead's twentieth studio album The Wörld Is Yours was the first new release to top the chart in 2011.

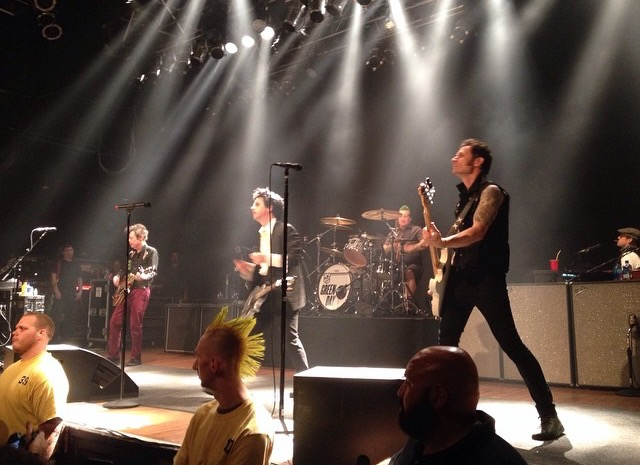
Green Day registered a record ninth UK Rock & Metal Albums Chart number one in 2011 with Awesome as Fuck.

Key
†	Indicates best-selling rock album of 2011

Issue date	Album	Artist(s)	Record label(s)	Ref.
1 January	Mothership	Led Zeppelin	Atlantic	
8 January	A Thousand Suns	Linkin Park	Warner Bros.	
15 January	A Thousand Suns	Linkin Park	Warner Bros.	
22 January	A Thousand Suns	Linkin Park	Warner Bros.	
29 January	The Wörld Is Yours	Motörhead	UDR	
5 February	The Here and Now	Architects	Century Media	
12 February	A Thousand Suns	Linkin Park	Warner Bros.	
19 February	A Thousand Suns	Linkin Park	Warner Bros.	
26 February	Mothership	Led Zeppelin	Atlantic	
5 March	Beast	DevilDriver	Roadrunner	
12 March	Greatest Hits	Foo Fighters	RCA	
19 March	Queens of the Stone Age	Queens of the Stone Age	Rekords	
26 March	Endgame	Rise Against	Interscope	
2 April	Awesome as Fuck	Green Day	Reprise	
9 April	The Unforgiving	Within Temptation	Roadrunner	
16 April	Hope	The Blackout	Cooking Vinyl	
23 April	Wasting Light †	Foo Fighters	RCA	
30 April	Wasting Light †	Foo Fighters	RCA	
7 May	Wasting Light †	Foo Fighters	RCA	
14 May	Wasting Light †	Foo Fighters	RCA	
21 May	Wasting Light †	Foo Fighters	RCA	
28 May	Wasting Light †	Foo Fighters	RCA	
4 June	Wasting Light †	Foo Fighters	RCA	
11 June	Between the Devil & the Deep Blue Sea	Black Stone Cherry	Roadrunner	
18 June	Wasting Light †	Foo Fighters	RCA	
25 June	Black Country Communion 2	Black Country Communion	Mascot	
2 July	Wasting Light †	Foo Fighters	RCA	
9 July	Revolutions: Live at Wembley	Biffy Clyro	14th Floor	
16 July	Wasting Light †	Foo Fighters	RCA	
23 July	Wasting Light †	Foo Fighters	RCA	
30 July	Wasting Light †	Foo Fighters	RCA	
6 August	Wasting Light †	Foo Fighters	RCA	
13 August	Greatest Hits	Foo Fighters	RCA	
20 August	In Waves	Trivium	Roadrunner	
27 August	In Gold Blood	Kids in Glass Houses	Roadrunner	
3 September	Greatest Hits	Foo Fighters	RCA	
10 September	Greatest Hits	Foo Fighters	RCA	
17 September	Greatest Hits	Foo Fighters	RCA	
24 September	A Dramatic Turn of Events	Dream Theater	Roadrunner	
1 October	Heritage	Opeth	Roadrunner	
8 October	Neighborhoods	Blink-182	Island	
15 October	Sinners Never Sleep	You Me at Six	Virgin	
22 October	Evanescence	Evanescence	Virgin/Wind-up	
29 October	Evanescence	Evanescence	Virgin/Wind-up	
5 November	Evanescence	Evanescence	Virgin/Wind-up	
12 November	Thirteen	Megadeth	Roadrunner	
19 November	Fools and Worthless Liars	Deaf Havana	Easy Life	
26 November	Evanescence	Evanescence	Virgin/Wind-up	
3 December	Here and Now	Nickelback	Roadrunner	
10 December	Here and Now	Nickelback	Roadrunner	
17 December	Here and Now	Nickelback	Roadrunner	
24 December	Here and Now	Nickelback	Roadrunner	
31 December	Here and Now	Nickelback	Roadrunner	

== See also ==
- 2011 in British music
- List of UK Rock & Metal Singles Chart number ones of 2011
