= List of UK Rock & Metal Singles Chart number ones of 2013 =

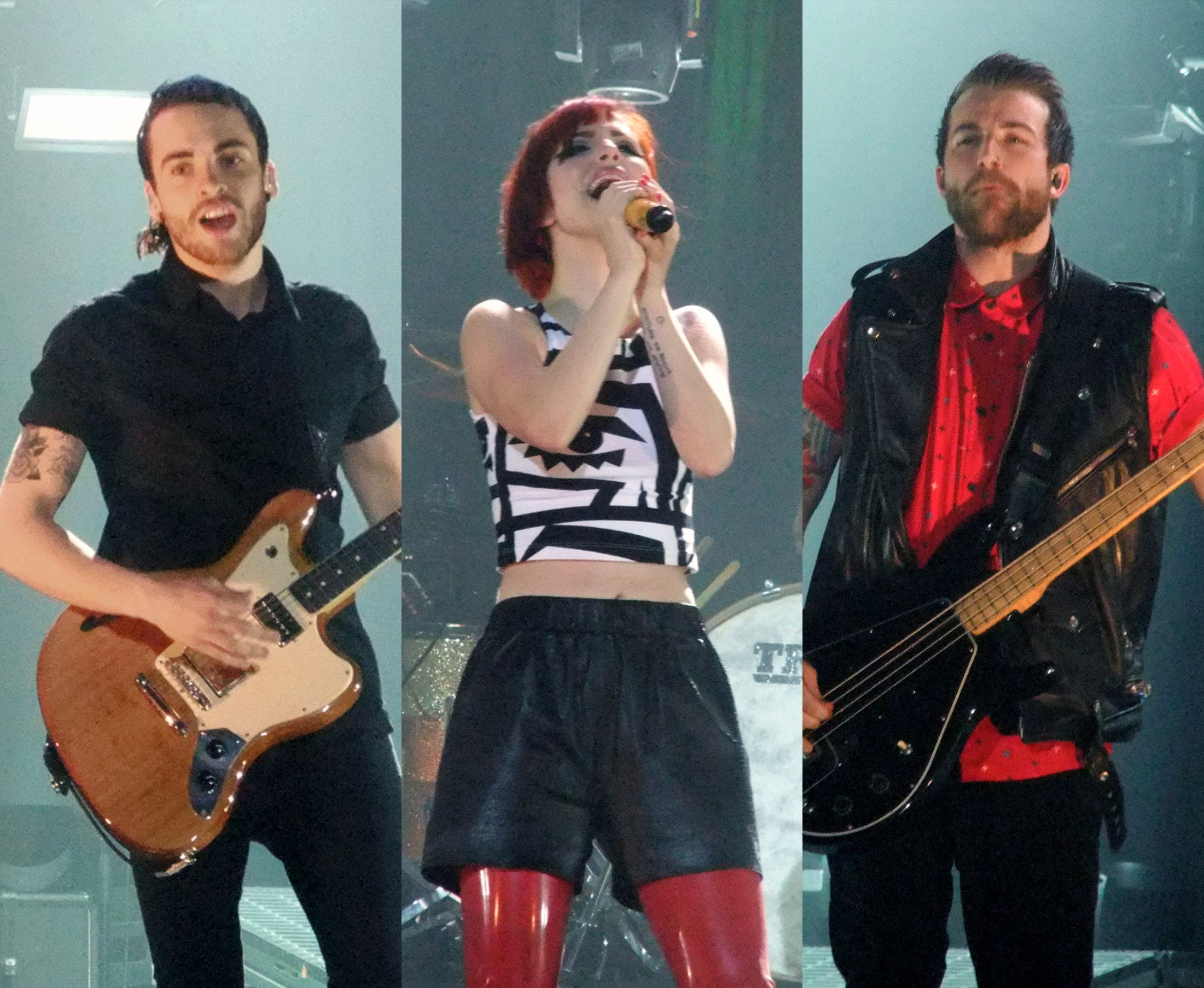
Paramore's "Still Into You" was the longest-running number one of 2013, spending 17 weeks atop the chart.

The UK Rock & Metal Singles Chart is a record chart which ranks the best-selling rock and heavy metal songs in the United Kingdom. Compiled and published by the Official Charts Company, the data is based on each track's weekly physical sales, digital downloads and streams. In 2013, there were 15 singles that topped the 52 published charts. The first number-one single of the year was "Back in Black" by Australian hard rock band AC/DC, which spent the first two weeks of the year atop the chart. AC/DC also had the final number-one single of the year, "Highway to Hell", which topped the chart in the final week of 2013 and the first of 2014.

The most successful song on the UK Rock & Metal Singles Chart in 2013 was "Still Into You", the second single from Paramore's self-titled fourth studio album Paramore, which spent a total of seventeen weeks at number one during the year, including a single run of seven consecutive weeks. Fall Out Boy spent sixteen weeks at number one with four singles: "My Songs Know What You Did in the Dark (Light Em Up)", "The Phoenix", "Alone Together" and "Young Volcanoes". You Me at Six were number one for five weeks during the year, three of which were with "Lived a Lie" and two of which were for "Fresh Start Fever". "Iris" by Goo Goo Dolls was number one for four weeks, while Biffy Clyro spent four weeks at number one with two releases: "Black Chandelier" and "Opposite". AC/DC spent three weeks atop the chart in 2013.

== Chart history ==
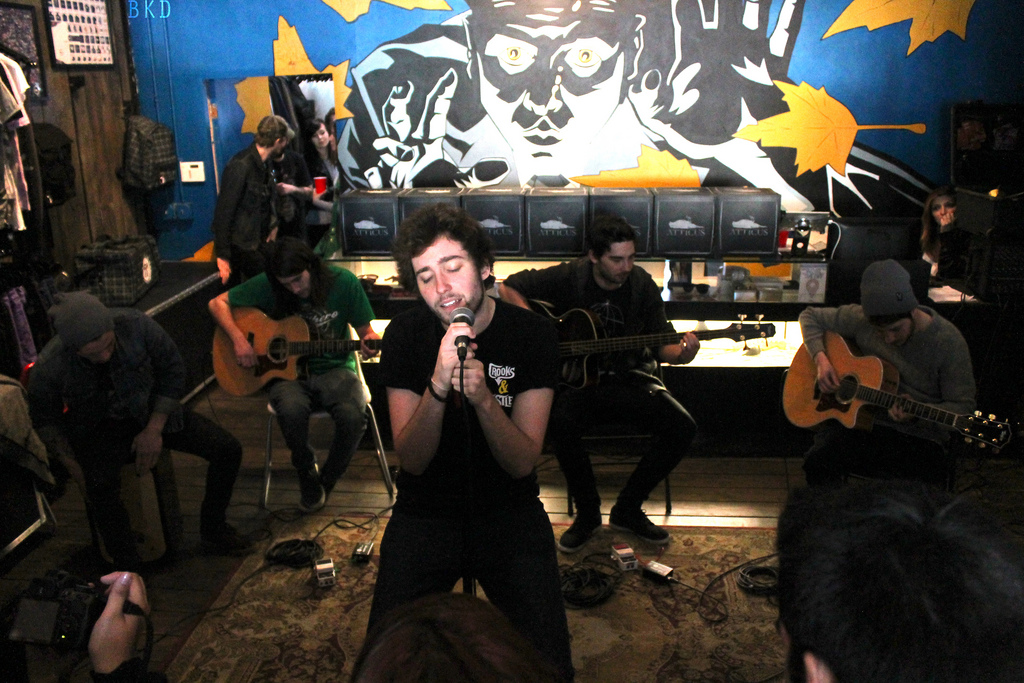
Two singles by You Me at Six reached number one: "Lived a Lie" (three weeks) and "Fresh Start Fever" (two weeks).

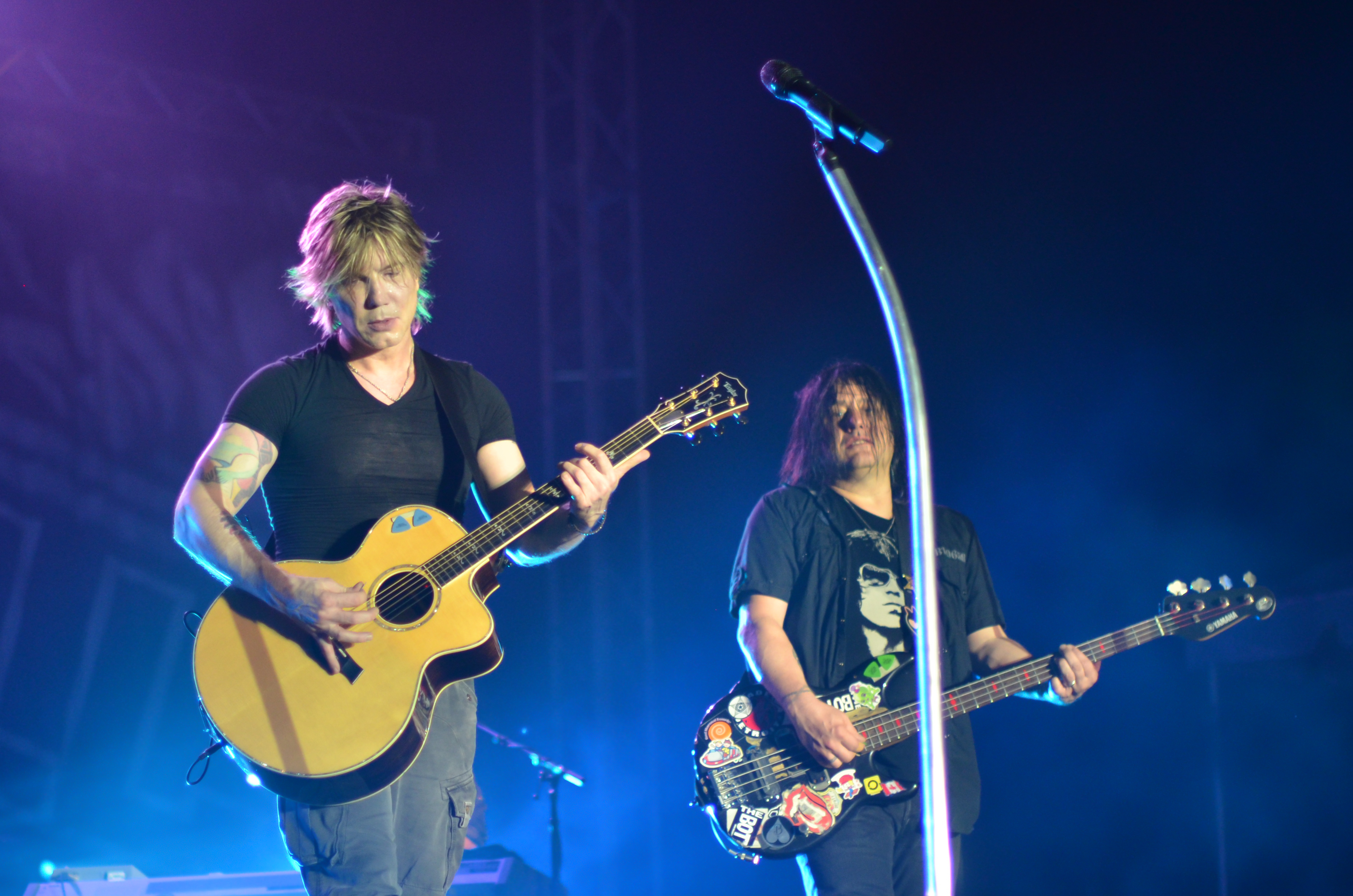
"Iris" by the Goo Goo Dolls spent four weeks at number one in 2013.

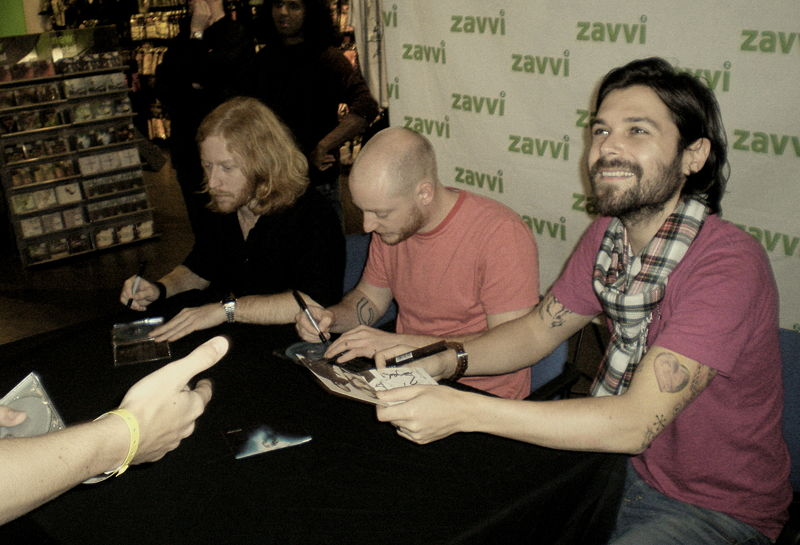
Biffy Clyro topped the chart twice in 2013 with "Black Chandelier" (three weeks) and "Opposite" (one week).

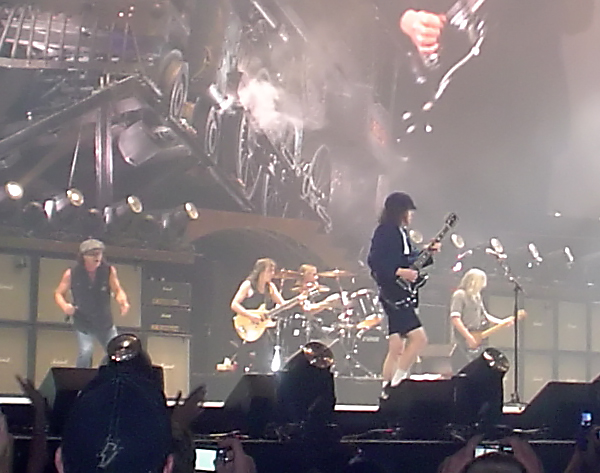
AC/DC were number one during the first two weeks and the last week of the year, with "Back in Black" and "Highway to Hell", respectively.

Issue date	Single	Artist(s)	Record label(s)	Ref.
5 January	"Back in Black"	AC/DC	Epic	
12 January	"Back in Black"	AC/DC	Epic	
19 January	"Kiss the Ring"	My Chemical Romance	Reprise	
26 January	"Black Chandelier"	Biffy Clyro	14th Floor	
2 February	"Black Chandelier"	Biffy Clyro	14th Floor	
9 February	"Black Chandelier"	Biffy Clyro	14th Floor	
16 February	"My Songs Know What You; Did in the Dark (Light Em Up)"	Fall Out Boy	Def Jam	
23 February	"My Songs Know What You; Did in the Dark (Light Em Up)"	Fall Out Boy	Def Jam	
2 March	"My Songs Know What You; Did in the Dark (Light Em Up)"	Fall Out Boy	Def Jam	
9 March	"My Songs Know What You; Did in the Dark (Light Em Up)"	Fall Out Boy	Def Jam	
16 March	"My Songs Know What You; Did in the Dark (Light Em Up)"	Fall Out Boy	Def Jam	
23 March	"My Songs Know What You; Did in the Dark (Light Em Up)"	Fall Out Boy	Def Jam	
30 March	"My Songs Know What You; Did in the Dark (Light Em Up)"	Fall Out Boy	Def Jam	
6 April	"My Songs Know What You; Did in the Dark (Light Em Up)"	Fall Out Boy	Def Jam	
13 April	"The Phoenix"	Fall Out Boy	Def Jam	
20 April	"Still Into You"	Paramore	Decaydance/Fueled by Ramen	
27 April	"Still Into You"	Paramore	Decaydance/Fueled by Ramen	
4 May	"Still Into You"	Paramore	Decaydance/Fueled by Ramen	
11 May	"Iris"	Goo Goo Dolls	Warner Bros.	
18 May	"Still Into You"	Paramore	Decaydance/Fueled by Ramen	
25 May	"Still Into You"	Paramore	Decaydance/Fueled by Ramen	
1 June	"Still Into You"	Paramore	Decaydance/Fueled by Ramen	
8 June	"Still Into You"	Paramore	Decaydance/Fueled by Ramen	
15 June	"Still Into You"	Paramore	Decaydance/Fueled by Ramen	
22 June	"Still Into You"	Paramore	Decaydance/Fueled by Ramen	
29 June	"Still Into You"	Paramore	Decaydance/Fueled by Ramen	
6 July	"My Immortal"	Evanescence	Virgin/Wind-up	
13 July	"Opposite"	Biffy Clyro	14th Floor	
20 July	"Still Into You"	Paramore	Decaydance/Fueled by Ramen	
27 July	"Still Into You"	Paramore	Decaydance/Fueled by Ramen	
3 August	"Still Into You"	Paramore	Decaydance/Fueled by Ramen	
10 August	"Still Into You"	Paramore	Decaydance/Fueled by Ramen	
17 August	"Still Into You"	Paramore	Decaydance/Fueled by Ramen	
24 August	"Still Into You"	Paramore	Decaydance/Fueled by Ramen	
31 August	"Alone Together"	Fall Out Boy	Def Jam	
7 September	"Alone Together"	Fall Out Boy	Def Jam	
14 September	"Lived a Lie"	You Me at Six	BMG Rights	
21 September	"Lived a Lie"	You Me at Six	BMG Rights	
28 September	"Still Into You"	Paramore	Decaydance/Fueled by Ramen	
5 October	"Iris"	Goo Goo Dolls	Warner Bros.	
12 October	"Iris"	Goo Goo Dolls	Warner Bros.	
19 October	"Iris"	Goo Goo Dolls	Warner Bros.	
26 October	"You Wanna Know"	Don Broco	Search and Destroy	
2 November	"Lived a Lie"	You Me at Six	BMG Rights	
9 November	"Young Volcanoes"	Fall Out Boy	Def Jam	
16 November	"Young Volcanoes"	Fall Out Boy	Def Jam	
23 November	"Young Volcanoes"	Fall Out Boy	Def Jam	
30 November	"Young Volcanoes"	Fall Out Boy	Def Jam	
7 December	"Young Volcanoes"	Fall Out Boy	Def Jam	
14 December	"Fresh Start Fever"	You Me at Six	BMG Rights	
21 December	"Fresh Start Fever"	You Me at Six	BMG Rights	
28 December	"Highway to Hell"	AC/DC	Columbia	

== See also ==
- 2013 in British music
- List of UK Rock & Metal Albums Chart number ones of 2013
