= It's Called the Easy Life =

EP by Deaf Havana
- Released: 6 October 2008
- Genre: Post-hardcore
- Label: A Wolf at Your Door Records
- Producer: Jonny Renshaw, Matt O'Grady

Deaf Havana chronology
Love by the Riverside EP (2008)	It's Called the Easy Life (2008)	Meet Me Halfway, At Least (2009)

Singles from It's Called the Easy Life
- 1. "Oh Howard, You Crack Me Up" Released: 3 February 2009

It's Called the Easy Life is an EP by the English rock band Deaf Havana, released in 2008.

== Track listing ==
No.	Title	Length
1.	"This Afternoon Was a Total Disaster"	3:39
2.	"They Call It the Easy Life"	3:20
3.	"Keepin' It Sunny Side Up"	2:44
4.	"The Tune of ID (So She Doesn't Know It's About Her)"	5:04
5.	"Love by the Riverside"	2:25
6.	"Oh Howard, You Crack Me Up"	3:39

== Personnel ==
- Ryan Mellor – lead vocals
- James Veck-Gilodi – guitar, clean vocals
- Chris Pennells – guitar
- Lee Wilson – bass
- Tom Ogden – drums, percussion
