= All These Countless Nights =

Studio album by Deaf Havana
- Released: 27 January 2017
- Recorded: 2016
- Genre: Alternative rock
- Length: 45:07
- Label: So Recordings

Deaf Havana chronology
Old Souls (2013)	All These Countless Nights (2017)

Singles from All These Countless Nights
- 1. "Sing" Released: 11 July 2016; 2. "Trigger" Released: 14 October 2016

All These Countless Nights is the fourth studio album from English band Deaf Havana. It was released on 27 January 2017 through So Recordings. The album was re-released along with the "reworked" versions of the album's tracks and one bonus track on 27 October 2017.

== Releases ==
The first single was "Sing". It received its debut radio play on 10 July 2016 on the BBC Radio 1 Rock Show. It was released on 11 July 2016.

The second single was "Trigger", which was released on 14 October 2016.

== Track listing ==
No.	Title	Length
1.	"Ashes, Ashes"	3:54
2.	"Trigger"	3:00
3.	"L.O.V.E"	4:46
4.	"Happiness"	3:51
5.	"Fever"	3:34
6.	"Like A Ghost"	3:24
7.	"Pretty Low"	3:54
8.	"England"	3:09
9.	"Seattle"	4:02
10.	"St. Paul's"	3:57
11.	"Sing"	3:44
12.	"Pensacola, 2013"	3:47

Bonus tracks

Deluxe Edition bonus tracks
No.	Title	Length
13.	"Cassiopeia"	4:18
14.	"Anemophobia, Pt. 2"	5:07

All These Countless Nights (Reworked)

Disc 1 bonus track
No.	Title	Length
15.	"Sickago"	3:15

Disc 2
No.	Title	Length
1.	"Ashes, Ashes (Reworked)"	3:44
2.	"Trigger (Reworked)"	3:10
3.	"L.O.V.E (Reworked)"	3:31
4.	"Happiness (Reworked)"	3:54
5.	"Fever (Reworked)"	3:26
6.	"Like A Ghost (Reworked)"	2:31
7.	"Pretty Low (Reworked)"	3:16
8.	"England (Reworked)"	3:27
9.	"Seattle (Reworked)"	3:43
10.	"St. Paul's (Reworked)"	3:32
11.	"Sing (Reworked)"	2:47
12.	"Pensacola, 2013 (Reworked)"	4:02

== Chart performance ==
The album debuted on the UK Albums Chart at number 5, and topped the UK Independent Albums Chart.

Chart (2017)	Peak position
UK Independent Albums (OCC)	1
Scottish Albums (OCC)	2
UK Albums (OCC)	5
