= Cavalier Youth =

Studio album by You Me at Six
- Released: 27 January 2014
- Recorded: July–August 2013
- Studios: NRG (Los Angeles); La Casita (Los Angeles)
- Genres: Alternative rock; pop rock
- Length: 41:10
- Label: BMG
- Producer: Neal Avron

You Me at Six chronology
| Sinners Never Sleep (2011) | Cavalier Youth (2014) | Night People (2017) |

Singles from Cavalier Youth
- 1. "Lived a Lie" Released: 2 September 2013; 2. "Fresh Start Fever" Released: 3 December 2013; 3. "Room to Breathe" Released: 18 March 2014; 4. "Cold Night" Released: 27 April 2014 (EP); 5. "Forgive and Forget" Released: 9 December 2014

Cavalier Youth is the fourth studio album by English rock band You Me at Six, released on 27 January 2014 through BMG. A few months after the release of their third studio album Sinners Never Sleep, the band had started writing new material in early 2012. By the end of that year, they left their label Virgin Records and management; pre-production and further writing followed into early 2013. Neal Avron was enlisted to produce the band's next album, which was recorded in July and August 2013 at NRG Studio and Avron's home studio La Casita, both in Los Angeles, California. Cavalier Youth is an alternative rock and pop rock album, which saw input from the rest of the band members on the lyrics.

"Lived a Lie" was released as the lead single in September 2013, which was promoted with a headlining US tour, and then a support slot for Thirty Seconds to Mars in the United Kingdom. "Fresh Start Fever" was released as the album's second single in December 2013. "Room to Breathe" was released as the album's third single in March 2014, while the Cold Night EP appeared the next month. Both of these coincided with a tour of mainland Europe and the UK. "Forgive and Forget" was released as the album's fifth single December 2014, which was then followed with a co-headlining UK arena tour with All Time Low. They then toured Australia and appeared at the Slam Dunk and Isle of Wight Festivals.

Cavalier Youth received generally favourable reviews from music critics, some highlighting its arena sound, while others felt that the songs were uninspired. The album topped the Scottish and UK Albums Chart, as well as reaching the top 40 in Australia, Ireland and Sweden. Alongside this, it peaked at number 124 on the US Billboard 200. "Lived a Lie" charted at number 11 in the UK, while "Hope for the Best" and "Fresh Start Fever" reached lower positions. "Room to Breathe" charted at number 40 on the US Billboard Alternative Airplay chart. Cavalier Youth was ranked within the top 20 on Kerrang! and Rock Sound's lists for the top 50 albums of the year. "Fresh Start Fever" won the Best Single Award at the 2014 Kerrang! Awards.

== Background ==
You Me at Six released their third studio album Sinners Never Sleep in October 2011, which reached number three on the UK Albums Chart. Out of its four singles, "Loverboy" reached the highest position, peaking at number 39 in the UK. The album was certified silver by the British Phonographic Industry (BPI) by the year's end. Guitarist Max Helyer said the person that had signed them to Virgin in the first place had been replaced by its release. He added that they felt "like we got a bit lost because we lost our key person" at the label. In January 2012, vocalist Josh Franceschi said that he and Helyer had been writing new material, but estimated that they would not be working on another album for at least a year.

In March 2012, the band released "The Swarm" as single. Helyer revealed that while they were recording it, they also worked on ideas for new songs. Following a headlining show at Wembley arena in December 2012, the band parted ways with their record label Virgin Records and their management. Helyer, who thought the relationship with the label was fine, explained their departure: "I think for them it wasn't enough for what they were putting in to it ... we kind of got dropped a little bit and we had to fight for things we didn't have to usually fight for". He mentioned that they found it difficult to have the same connection with someone new as they had with their predecessor.

== Writing and Avron ==
In the lead up to the Wembley event, guitarist Chris Miller said they have some ideas for the next album, and by February 2013, they began working on Cavalier Youth. They spent five weeks doing pre-production at The Doghouse Studio in Henley-on-Thames, which was home studio that Flint built for the band to use for writing. The following month, the group were writing their new album at The Boathouse in Henley-on-Thames, which was owned by a friend of theirs. They wrote a portion of the album here over two–three weeks. In April and May 2013, the band supported Pierce the Veil and All Time Low in North America on the Spring Fever tour. You Me at Six compiled a wish list of producers, popular and obscure, that they loved.

You Me at Six met with some producers while on the Spring Fever tour, one of which being Neal Avron. Avron stood out to the band out of all the ones they met as he seemed to understand the group the most. They liked his previous work with Fall Out Boy, Linkin Park and Yellowcard. Further pre-production took place in June with Avron. They felt at ease with him present when playing and discussing the songs. Avron had the band pick three–four acts from any genre that they thought were enjoyable and felt they could take inspiration from. They subsequently picked him as producer for the next album due to being comfortable and the previous albums he's worked on.

== Production ==
Sessions took place in July and August 2013 in Los Angeles, California. They were initially against recording in this city because of the Sinners Never Sleep sessions that they promised not to record there again, requiring Avron to convince them. They stayed at a house with their respective girlfriends in Griffith Park. Avron handled recording with Erich Talaba. Drum tracks were done at NRG Studio, with assistance from Kris Giddens. The group spent a lot of time on figuring out a good drum sound. According to drummer Dan Flint, Avron "tor[e] apart our songs" and on occasion suggest additional fills to play. Recording then moved to La Casita, Spanish for "little house", a converted outhouse at Avron's residence. Miller said working here increased their morale "walk[ing] into a nice, sunny room in the morning." While the band didn't enjoy recording Sinners Never Sleep (2011), they found working with Avron a much more better experience. At Casita, they were assisted by Scott Skrzynski. In the past, the group tracked with people who were focused on vintage recording equipment. When walking into Avron's studio, he was surprised to see modern Krank and Vox amplifiers; the sole piece of vintage equipment being a Marshall amplifier. He thought "everything seemed very tame" to start with, but eventually "it all sounded really sweet."

Helyer brought in a Fender Deluxe Reverb amplifier, while Miller brought in an Audio Kitchen amplifier. In addition, Audio Kitchen's Big Chopper amplifier was also used. Miller used Gibson Les Paul Custom, ES-335 and SG guitars. He purchased a newer version of the ES-335 and was impressed with how different it sounded to his other ES-335 and subsequently used it on half of the album. Helyer mainly used a Fender Custom Strat guitar, alongside his Ibanez and Fender Jazzmaster. The pair also used Avron's Fender Telecaster and Danelectro Baritone guitars. They varied guitar tones from Vox and Marshall to Orange and Krank amplifiers. The pair used the Big Trees, Boss DD-20, Ibanez AD-80 and Roland Space Echo pedals. Towards the end of tracking, Avron was unsure about Franceschi's vocal on a calm song. Avron suggested that since it was a relaxing song, Franceschi should be relaxed. He remarked, "Yeah why don’t I go sit by the pool, and you bring out a microphone?" They went outside and tracked in the garden with Franceschi sat in a chair. They recorded four-to-five vocal performances and picked the best. Avron mixed the recordings at NRG, before they were mastered by Ted Jensen at Sterling Sound in New York.

== Composition and lyrics ==
Musically, the album's sound has been classified as alternative rock, pop rock, and rock. Flint attributed the change of sound to the extra time they had to write the material. They wanted to make a guitar-centric album to display their skills with said instrument. As such, when Helyer was watching a Parkway Drive DVD, he noticed the crowd singing a riff. "Room to Breathe", "Cold Night" and "Hope for the Best" were written with this in mind. Helyer said he would "almost start from the idea of humming it to myself and then put it on the guitar." Cavalier Youth marked the first time Franceschi asked for his bandmates' input on his lyrics. For two songs, he completely re-wrote the melody and lyrics. Avron contributed programming and keyboards to the recordings. "Too Young to Feel This Old" talks about moving on with your life despite hardship and finding your own identity. "Lived a Lie" discusses people who felt the group would not make it to arena-playing status. It ends with a gang vocal chant of "We are believers".

"Fresh Start Fever" displays Franceschi's vocal prowess, receiving comparisons to Infinity on High (2007)-era Fall Out Boy in the process, especially on that group's track "Thnks fr th Mmrs". It was written by Helyer and Miller while the rest of the band went on a night out. Franceschi mentioned that Avron's experience with programming gave the track its added texture. The chanting part of the verse sections was influenced by hip hop music. "Room to Breathe" talks about fighting to remain strong and breaking free. The song's riff was the first thing composed for the album. Helyer played it for the rest of the band and "an hour-and-a-half later" the track was written. It showcased Franceschi's vocal ability, and drew a comparison to the Foo Fighters. Some of the drum tracks for "Win Some, Lose Some" were recorded through an iPhone in a basement to acquire a certain distorted sound. The riff in "Cold Night" came about from Helyer playing with his Roland Space Echo pedal; the track was compared to Jimmy Eat World. The drum parts for it were influenced by Stewart Copeland of the Police, a drummer that Flint admires. The folk-pop track "Be Who You Are" is the shortest song on the album, clocking in under two minutes. "Wild Ones" is a slow-building track, compared to "Forever Young" (1984) by Alphaville.

== Release ==
On 2 September 2013, a music video was released for "Lived a Lie". In addition, it was mentioned that the group's next album would be titled Cavalier Youth. On the same day, "Lived a Lie" was released as a single, after a premier on BBC Radio 1. On 13 November 2013, Cavalier Youth was announced for release in two months' time. In addition, its track listing and artwork was revealed. Two days later, "Hope for the Best" was made available for streaming. After a premier on BBC Radio 1 on 3 December, "Fresh Start Fever" was released as a single the following day. A music video was also released. Cavalier Youth was released on 27 January 2014 through major label BMG. A mutual friend of BMG witnessed the band at Reading Festival in 2012. Subsequently, an A&R representative was adamant about signing the vans to the point he flew out to Los Angeles while they were recording. BMG allowed them to have the support of a major label while retaining the atmosphere of an independent label.

The album was released the following day in North America through Prospect Park. The CD/DVD version included a making-of documentary, titled Oceans Away, filmed during the recording process. The iTunes Store edition included the documentary, as well as "Champagne Wishes" and the music video for "Lived a Lie". Prospect Park Records president Jeremy Summers had previously worked with BMG on releases with Backstreet Boys and Five Finger Death Punch; Dave Wallace from You Me at Six's management called Summers to congratulate him on the success of those two acts. Summers said the label had been aware of You Me at Six's success in the UK, with some members of staff seeing them live, being impressed by the performance. Following this, he decided to sign them.

Franceschi recounted that their albums had lacklustre support in the US previously, explaining that they had never met people from Epitaph Records, who handled Take Off Your Colours or Virgin Records, who handled Hold Me Down (2010) and Sinners Never Sleep. He was adamant about the band making a push at US radio, "because it is obscene that we can have the number one selling rock single in Australia and in the UK and then not even have that song played on radio in America". To promote the release, the band did a series of in-store acoustic performances and signing events. On 17 March, a US mix of "Room to Breathe" premiered through USA Today, before being released as a single the following day. According to Franceschi, Avron made the mix exclusively as a "unique introduction to American audiences." Summers said they picked it out of four possible choices, say it had the "makings of a great rock song - big guitars, soaring vocals and lyrics that everyone can identify with".

A music video was released for "Room to Breathe" on 31 March, directed by Tom Welsh. It features tour footage from their previous tours. The song was released to US alternative radio on 8 April. "Cold Night" was released as an EP, which included live radio performances of "Lived a Lie", "Fresh Start Fever" and a cover of the Beatles' "Come Together" on 27 April. The following day, a music video was released for "Cold Night". "Room to Breathe" was released as a single on 28 July. The following day, another music video was released for the track. Video were released for acoustic versions "Lived a Lie" and "Room to Breathe" on 7 October and 23 October, respectively. On 27 October, a special edition of the album was released. It featured five acoustic versions of album tracks and a DVD. The acoustic versions were recorded with producer Stephen Street. "Forgive and Forget" was released as a single on 9 December.

== Touring ==
In September and October 2013, the group went on a headlining US tour with support from Cute Is What We Aim For, Conditions, Tonight Alive and Dinosaur Pile-Up. Following this, the band supported Thirty Seconds to Mars on their headlining tour of mainland Europe, followed by a stint in the UK through to November 2013. In January 2014, the group supported Paramore on their headlining Australian tour. In March, the group went on a mainland European tour, followed by a number of UK shows running into April 2014. They were supported by Don Broco and Young Kato. In May, the band performed at BBC Radio 1's Big Weekend. In August, the band appeared at the Reading and Leeds Festivals. In September, the group played a one-off show in Singapore, and then went on a co-headlining Australian tour with Tonight Alive. They were supported by Call the Shots, With Confidence, Masketta Fall and Day Break.

Between September and November 2014, You Me at Six went on a headlining US tour, with support from Young Guns and Stars in Stereo. It was initially meant to take place in April and May, but was postponed due to Franceschi suffering from vocal exhaustion. It was meant to last two weeks, before being expanded into 37 shows. In early 2015, the band played one-off shows in Guildford and Hoxton, London as part of Independent Venue Week and Passport: Back To The Bars, respectively. In February 2015, the group went on a co-headlining UK arena tour with All Time Low, with support from Walk the Moon. In April and May, the band played in Australia with Luca Brasi supporting, around their appearance at the Groovin' the Moo festival. Later in May, the group headlined the Slam Dunk Festival, and performed at the Isle of Wight Festival the following month.

== Reception ==
=== Critical reception ===
Professional ratings
Aggregate scores
| Source | Rating |
|---|---|
| AnyDecentMusic? | 5.7/10 |
| Metacritic | 66/100 |
Review scores
| Source | Rating |
| AllMusic | 2.5/5 stars |
| Alternative Press | 3/5 stars |
| Digital Spy | 3.5/5 stars |
| Dead Press! | 8/10 stars |
| The Guardian | 3/5 stars |
| MusicRadar | 4/5 |
| The Observer | 1/5 stars |
| Sputnikmusic | 3.2/5 |
| This Is Fake DIY | 3/5 stars |
| Thrash Hits | 2/6 |

Cavalier Youth was met with generally favourable reviews from music critics. At Metacritic, which assigns a normalized rating out of 100 to reviews from mainstream publications, the album received an average score of 66, based on nine reviews. AnyDecentMusic? gave it an average score of 5.7, based on seven reviews.

Lewis Corner of Digital Spy wrote that the band had a "slightly more mature outlook on life, while still connecting with an audience submerged in adolescent angst". This Is Fake DIY's Sarah Jamieson write that the band offered an "array of songs that will undoubtedly allow them access to the upper echelons of arena pop-rock that have already been calling". Dead Press! writer Michael Heath felt that the band "returned with a more widely appreciated tone", scaling back the "dark sinister nature" of the previous album. He said it was "arena style music for a band with arena sized expectations and this is the best album they could have released to take them to where they want to be". The Guardian critic Caroline Sullivan wrote that the tracks "aren't subtle or overly innovative, but they hit their target", as the album was "consistently tuneful, yet also pile-driving and monolithic" MusicRadar's David Hands shared a similar sentiment, stating that the "yearning melodies make these songs feel instantly familiar and the personal emotion resonates".

AllMusic reviewer Scott Kerr despite the three years between albums, Cavalier Youth does not "show much appetite to push the boundaries" of their sound. He added it was "unsurprising that this album is filled to the brim of arena-sized singalong choruses [...] but unfortunately, they sound all too familiar". Sputnikmusic staff writer DaveyBoy said apart from the opening three songs, the rest of the album was "very much a mixed bag, failing to hit the target more often than it succeeds". Alternative Press writer Evan Lucy said the album was "brimming with the kind of rafter-reaching rock that’s tailor made for filling Wembley Arena". He viewed this as a negative, stating that the "whole thing feels a bit sterile and focus-grouped to death". Tom Doyle of Thrash Hits referred to it as the "most blatant attempt yet from the band to grow up", seeing it as a "bit boring". The Observer subeditor Paul Mardles was highly critical, saying that the album was full of "formulaic riffs, festival-friendly choruses and timeworn sentiments", discarding it as "corporate alt-rock at its most pedestrian".

=== Commercial performance and accolades ===
Cavalier Youth topped the UK Albums Chart, selling 32,000 copies in the first week. Franceschi considered it "a big moment" for the band and "the start of something incredible for the [album] cycle". It ranked at number 97 on the UK year-end chart. It was certified Silver by the BPI in July 2014 and Gold in June 2018. Outside of this territory, it reached number one in Scotland, number 14 in Australia, number 23 in Sweden, number 27 in Ireland, number 75 in Switzerland, number 85 in Germany and number 105 in the Flanders region of Belgium. In the US, it peaked at number 124 on the Billboard 200. In addition to this, it topped Top Heatseekers, and appeared at number 22 on Top Alternative Albums, number 24 on Independent Albums and number 35 on Top Rock Albums.

"Lived a Lie" charted at number 11 in the UK and number 84 in Ireland. "Hope for the Best" charted at number 75 in the UK. "Room to Breathe" charted at number 40 on the US Billboard Alternative Airplay chart. "Fresh Start Fever" charted at number 46 in the UK.

Cavalier Youth was included at number 7 on Rock Sound's "Top 50 Albums of the Year" list. The album was included at number 15 on Kerrang!'s "The Top 50 Rock Albums Of 2014" list. "Fresh Start Fever" was nominated for Best Single, and Cavalier Youth for Best Album, at the 2014 Kerrang! Awards; "Fresh Start Fever" won, but Cavalier Youth lost to Lost Forever // Lost Together (2014) by Architects. In 2021, Franceschi ranked Cavalier Youth as his second favourite You Me at Six album, stating that the "overall experience of making this album is why it sits so highly for me [...] In terms of life experiences, it's right up there for me in what we’ve done as a band".

== Track listing ==
All songs written by You Me at Six.

1. "Too Young to Feel This Old" – 4:11
2. "Lived a Lie" – 3:23
3. "Fresh Start Fever" – 3:36
4. "Forgive and Forget" – 4:00
5. "Room to Breathe" – 3:59
6. "Win Some, Lose Some" – 3:56
7. "Cold Night" – 4:05
8. "Hope for the Best" – 2:50
9. "Love Me Like You Used To" – 3:04
10. "Be Who You Are" – 1:48
11. "Carpe Diem" – 3:14
12. "Wild Ones" – 5:02

== Personnel ==
Personnel per booklet.

You Me at Six

- Josh Franceschi – vocals
- Max Helyer – guitar
- Chris Miller – guitar
- Matt Barnes – bass guitar
- Dan Flint – drums

Additional musicians

- Neal Avron – keyboards, programming

Production and design

- Neal Avron – producer, recording, mixing
- Erich Talaba – recording engineer
- Scott Skrzynski – recording assistant
- Kris Giddens – recording assistant
- Ted Jensen – mastering
- Shane MacCauley – cover photograph
- Tom Welsh – additional photography
- Studio Juice – artwork

== Charts ==
=== Weekly charts ===
Chart performance for Cavalier Youth
| Chart (2014) | Peak position |
|---|---|
| Australian Albums (ARIA) | 14 |
| Belgian Albums (Ultratop Flanders) | 107 |
| German Albums (Offizielle Top 100) | 85 |
| Irish Albums (IRMA) | 27 |
| Scottish Albums (Official Charts) | 1 |
| Swedish Albums (Sverigetopplistan) | 23 |
| Swiss Albums (Schweizer Hitparade) | 75 |
| UK Albums (Official Charts) | 1 |
| UK Rock & Metal Albums (Official Charts) | 1 |
| US Billboard 200 | 124 |
| US Heatseekers Albums (Billboard) | 1 |
| US Independent Albums (Billboard) | 24 |
| US Top Alternative Albums (Billboard) | 22 |
| US Top Rock Albums (Billboard) | 35 |

=== Year-end charts ===
Year-end chart performance for Cavalier Youth
| Chart (2014) | Position |
|---|---|
| UK Albums (OCC) | 97 |

== Certifications ==
Certifications for Cavalier Youth
| Region | Certification | Certified units/sales |
|---|---|---|
| United Kingdom (BPI) | Gold | 100,000^{‡} |
^{‡} Sales+streaming figures based on certification alone.
