= Meet Me Halfway, at Least =

Studio album by Deaf Havana
- Released: October 5, 2009
- Genre: Post-hardcore, alternative rock
- Label: A Wolf at Your Door Records
- Producer: Matt O'Grady

Deaf Havana chronology
| It's Called the Easy Life (2008) | Meet Me Halfway, at Least (2009) | Fools and Worthless Liars (2011) |

Singles from Meet Me Halfway, at Least
- 1. "Friends Like These" Released: 1 January 2009; 2. "Nicotine and Alcohol Saved My Life" Released: 15 March 2010

Meet Me Halfway, at Least is the debut album from English rock band Deaf Havana. It was produced by Matt O'Grady and was released on 5 October 2009, through Wolf At Your Door Records. It was their second release via Wolf At Your Door following the EP It's Called the Easy Life. Music videos for the songs "Friends Like These" and "Nicotine and Alcohol Saved My Life" gained them regular airtime on UK music channels Kerrang!, Scuzz and Lava. Following the release of the album, they toured UK and Europe, leading them to playing many popular UK festivals towards the second half of 2010 and a sellout tour of the UK in November 2010, which they co-headlined with American band There for Tomorrow.

The release turned out to be the last release featuring screamer and co-founding member Ryan Mellor.

== Track listing ==
| No. | Title | Length |
|---|---|---|
| 1. | "This Town Is Ours" | 4:03 |
| 2. | "Friends Like These" | 2:51 |
| 3. | "3 Cheers for the Easy Life" (featuring Gustav Wood of Young Guns) | 3:47 |
| 4. | "Nicotine and Alcohol Saved My Life" | 4:40 |
| 5. | "Another Day in This House" | 4:35 |
| 6. | "Waves" | 5:10 |
| 7. | "Ice Doesn't Help the Uncoordinated" | 2:58 |
| 8. | "You Are Beautiful" | 4:02 |
| 9. | "Right Now, I'm Anyone's" | 3:10 |
| 10. | "I Guess I'll Be Leaving Soon" | 4:06 |
| 11. | "In Desperate Need of Adventure" | 6:28 |

== Personnel ==
- Ryan Mellor – screamed vocals
- James Veck-Gilodi – guitar, clean vocals
- Chris Pennells – guitar
- Lee Wilson – bass
- Tom Ogden – drums, percussion
