= Teenage Dirtbags =

Compilation album by various artists
- Released: August 19, 2013
- Genre: Pop punk; alternative rock; punk rock; power pop; skate punk; ska punk
- Length: 69:52 (CD 1); 72:40 (CD 2)
- Label: UMTV
- Producer: UMTV

Teenage Dirtbags chronology
Teenage Dirtbags (2013)	Teenage Dirtbags 2 (2014)

Teenage Dirtbags is a double-disc compilation album that was released in the United Kingdom on August 19, 2013, on CD and downloadable formats. Teenage Dirtbags is the first compilation album of the Teenage Dirtbags series. The album takes its name from the Wheatus song "Teenage Dirtbag", which is also included on the compilation album. It features popular charted songs from the pop punk era of the late 1990s and early 2000s, from such artists as Blink-182, Sum 41, the Bloodhound Gang, +44 and Less Than Jake.

Professional ratings
Review scores
Source	Rating
Allmusic	3/5 stars
rateyourmusic	2.5/5 stars
Alternative Vision	4/5 stars
Drowned in Sound	0/10 stars

== Track list ==
=== CD 1 ===
No.	Title	Artist	Length
1.	"Teenage Dirtbag"	Wheatus	4:03
2.	"All the Small Things"	Blink-182	2:49
3.	"In Too Deep"	Sum 41	3:26
4.	"My Own Worst Enemy"	Lit	2:51
5.	"My Friends Over You"	New Found Glory	3:41
6.	"Girl All the Bad Guys Want"	Bowling For Soup	3:18
7.	"Smooth Criminal"	Alien Ant Farm	3:27
8.	"Stacy's Mom"	Fountains Of Wayne	3:17
9.	"Bohemian Like You"	The Dandy Warhols	3:31
10.	"She Hates Me"	Puddle Of Mudd	3:37
11.	"All Star"	Smash Mouth	3:19
12.	"Heaven Is A Halfpipe"	OPM	4:17
13.	"Steal My Sunshine"	Len	3:30
14.	"Every Morning"	Sugar Ray	3:39
15.	"The Reason"	Hoobastank	3:54
16.	"Butterfly"	Crazy Town	3:35
17.	"Sell Out"	Reel Big Fish	3:47
18.	"Santeria"	Sublime	3:05
19.	"She's Gonna Break Soon"	Less Than Jake	3:14
20.	"Superman"	Goldfinger	3:05
21.	"Flavor of the Weak"	American Hi-Fi	3:07
22.	"Try Honesty"	Billy Talent	4:15
Total length:			1:09:52

=== CD 2 ===
No.	Title	Artist	Length
1.	"Buddy Holly"	Weezer	2:39
2.	"No One Knows"	Queens of the Stone Age	4:14
3.	"The Bad Touch"	The Bloodhound Gang	3:19
4.	"Last Resort"	Papa Roach	3:19
5.	"Dance, Dance"	Fall Out Boy	3:00
6.	"Celebrity Skin"	Hole	2:42
7.	"Tainted Love"	Marilyn Manson	3:20
8.	"In the Shadows"	The Rasmus	4:16
9.	"Bring Me To Life"	Evanescence	3:57
10.	"Party Hard"	Andrew W.K.	3:05
11.	"Alive"	P.O.D.	3:23
12.	"Shake It"	Metro Station	2:59
13.	"I Feel So"	Box Car Racer	4:29
14.	"Get Over It"	Ok Go	3:16
15.	"Ocean Avenue"	Yellowcard	3:15
16.	"Juneau"	Funeral For A Friend	3:36
17.	"Nothing"	A	3:41
18.	"Beating Heart Baby"	Head Automatica	3:24
19.	"Used For Glue"	Rival Schools	3:18
20.	"Silver"	Hundred Reasons	3:18
21.	"Face Down"	The Red Jumpsuit Apparatus	3:10
22.	"The Boys of Summer"	The Ataris	4:20
Total length:			1:12:40
