= Fresh Start Fever =

Single by You Me at Six

from the album Cavalier Youth
- Released: 3 December 2013
- Recorded: 2013
- Genre: Alternative rock, pop punk, pop rock
- Length: 3:36
- Label: Virgin, Prospect Park
- Songwriter(s): Matt Barnes, Dan Flint, Josh Franceschi, Max Helyer, Chris Miller
- Producer(s): Neal Avron

You Me at Six singles chronology
"Lived a Lie" (2013)	"Fresh Start Fever" (2013)	"Room to Breathe" (2014)

Fresh Start Fever is a song by English rock band You Me At Six, released on 3 December 2013 as the second single from their fourth album, Cavalier Youth (2014).

In an interview with Kerrang!, vocalist Josh Franceschi explained, "When we started writing in the cottage we rented in Henley, Oxfordshire, we discussed how the album didn't yet have a song that represented what our band had been about until that point. We wanted to write a big pop-rock song, with exaggerated verses and a jump-up-and-down chorus." He further said, "Neal Avron brought all of his expertise of programmed drums and strings and horns, which gave the song a more layered texture. There is a group chant thing in the verse as well that was inspired more by hip-hop artists that we were listening to at the time."

"Fresh Start Fever" received the Kerrang! Award for Best Single.

== Personnel ==
You Me at Six

- Josh Franceschi – lead vocals
- Chris Miller – lead guitar
- Max Helyer – rhythm guitar
- Matt Barnes – bass guitar, percussion
- Dan Flint – drums, percussion
