= Fools and Worthless Liars =

Studio album by Deaf Havana
- Released: 7 November 2011
- Genre: Alternative rock, emo-pop, pop punk, folk punk
- Length: 44:09
- Label: A Wolf at Your Door, BMG/Chrysalis
- Producer: Matt O'Grady

Deaf Havana chronology
Meet Me Halfway, at Least (2009)	Fools and Worthless Liars (2011)	Old Souls (2013)

Singles from Fools and Worthless Liars
- 1. "I'm a Bore, Mostly" Released: 9 October 2011; 2. "Leeches" Released: 4 March 2012; 3. "Little White Lies" Released: 28 May 2012; 4. "Hunstanton Pier"

Fools and Worthless Liars is the second album from English band Deaf Havana and the first since the departure of founding member Ryan Mellor. The album marks a departure from the band's earlier post-hardcore style of music. It instead favours a song-orientated power pop approach heavily influenced by bands such as Jimmy Eat World as well as the modern British wave of pop punk, largely due to the band's decision not to replace Mellor, who was a screamer. Critics were generally very supportive of this development.

Fools And Worthless Liars was produced by Matt O'Grady (who has previously worked with You Me at Six) and was released on 7 November 2011. The band's frontman, James Veck-Gilodi, has been quoted as saying he struggled to write the album. Much of the album's lyrics are centred on the themes of youth and nostalgia.

The album charted at No. 49 on the UK album charts; the band's third most successful album release. As a result of the album's success, the band played at larger venues than they had previously and performed at Reading and Leeds Festivals. A deluxe edition of the album wes released on 22 October 2012; this edition included each song performed in a different style alongside the original tracks.

== Background ==
Deaf Havana were originally a five-piece band, incorporating screaming vocals in their music, as demonstrated on their previous work Meet Me Halfway, at Least. Shortly after the release of this album, vocalist and founding member Ryan Mellor left the band, citing personal reasons, leaving the group without a screamer. It was decided that Mellor would not be replaced; clean vocalist James Veck-Gilodi would become the sole vocalist and act as the band's frontman. This led to a change in the musical style of the group; they moved away from post-hardcore which had characterised their earlier releases towards pop punk and power pop. A demo track, titled "My Life Is Average", showcasing their new, lighter sound, was uploaded to the band's Myspace page shortly after Ryan's departure. In an interview, Veck-Gilodi explained, 'We didn't want to announce Ryan had left, and then have months off, for people to wonder what we were doing. We wanted to get a song out there with just me singing... so people could hear our new sound'.

Deaf Havana released a number of other tracks in the period between Meet Me Halfway, At Least and Fools and Worthless Liars, including "Smiles All Round", which was released as a single on 1 November 2010 and debuted on the Daniel P Carter Rock Show on 21 September 2010. It featured on the soundtrack of the video game Dirt 3 but does not appear on Fools and Worthless Liars. Some songs such as "Little White Lies" (then titled "Pop"), "I Will Try", "Filthy Rotten Scoundrel" (then titled "Vines") and "Youth in Retrospect" were frequently played live before the release of Fools and Worthless Liars. "Home Sweet Home" was played live but did not feature on the album. On 20 May 2011, Deaf Havana uploaded a music video, directed by Jon Stone and featuring footage from Hit The Deck Festival, for the track "The World Or Nothing" to YouTube. It was the first song from Fools and Worthless Liars (although the album title had not yet been announced at the time) to be officially released, although it was not released as a single. The title of the album was made public on 23 September 2011.

The album was re-released as a 2-disc 'Deluxe Edition' on 22 October 2012. The second disc includes the album re-recorded, with each song performed in a different style, including acoustic performances. It was recorded at Regal House Studio in Cambridgeshire, and produced by Lee Batiuk, with Chris Pennells and Lee Wilson involved in the recording process unlike the original release, after the band were inspired to experiment with their sound by performing at St Pancras International railway station as part of the Station Sessions. This was the same studio where the drums were recorded for the original release. Speaking about the Station Sessions performance, which was an acoustic 'stripped down' performance, James Veck-Gilodi explained; 'we thought we sounded better than we did as a rock band' and noted that 'it's nice to make music that sounds more like the music I listen to'. The release will feature banjo, mandolin and piano.

== Production ==
Fools and Worthless Liars was Produced and Engineered by Matt O'Grady at his home studios in Woking Surrey, and mixed by John Mitchell. 'Little White Lies', and 'Hunstanton Pier' single and radio edits were mixed by Matt O'Grady.

Despite an 18-month struggle to write the album, the majority of Fools and Worthless Liars was written and demoed in a ten-day period at some point in 2010. Veck-Gilodi has revealed that he initially wrote all the songs on an acoustic guitar before playing them with the full band. Recording began on 19 February 2011 and lasted until the album was completed in late summer 2011. 18 songs were recorded for the album. Several earlier written songs played live prior to the album do not feature on the record, the most notable of which is the absence of intended first single "Smiles All Round".

== Themes ==
We never demoed this song so the vocals you hear on the recording was the first time I had ever sung them, and I can certainly hear the desperation in my voice.

— James Veck-Gilodi, speaking about the song Anemophobia

Frontman James Veck-Gilodi has spoken at length about the themes of each song on the album, describing them as 'very personal and each is a small story that depicts a part of my life'. Much of the album is about nostalgia, underachievement and anxiety, which are all topics which are personal to him as he wrote all the lyrics for the album. The opening track "The Past Six Years", from whose lyrics the album takes its title, is described as 'an ode to... not really achieving as much as we'd have liked'. The lyrics make reference to friends and fellow bands Lower Than Atlantis and Young Guns and how James feels 'a perpetual bitterness and jealousy towards them in terms of their achievements, despite the fact that they are close friends'. "I'm a Bore, Mostly" also deals with the topic of underachievement, with James explaining that the song is about 'the mundane daily routine I had when I was living in London. ...I couldn't deal with city life, I rarely left the house and found myself sinking into this terrible routine. I didn't really appreciate anything at the time and I had no enthusiasm'. He has claimed he wrote the song "Filthy Rotten Scoundrel" about himself; 'I need to learn to be grateful and appreciate the opportunities that I have been given. It's also about my fear of living, dying and never really achieving anything'. "The World or Nothing" continues this trend, with James describing the theme as 'the vicious cycle of feeling lost and resorting to the aid of alcohol while also feeling lost because of alcohol. It talks about how self-destructive a lot of us are and how we enjoy abusing our bodies'. Of "Nelson's County", Veck-Gilodi has said: 'This song is about the county of Norfolk and how a lot of the people who reside there seem to have no real ambition other than working a 9–5, raising a family and living a normal life'.

Norfolk is the home county of Deaf Havana and many of the songs on Fools and Worthless Liars focus on the members childhoods' in the area. "Hunstanton Pier" is about the town of Hunstanton, where James Veck-Gilodi and bassist Lee Wilson went to school. 'It brings me back to the only place I ever really felt at home, and how much I miss it. It's hard for me to sing sometimes because it leads my mind to wander off and think about all the people I used to be so close to and what they are doing now'. "Youth in Retrospect" also deals with nostalgia and is again particularly personal to Veck-Gilodi and Lee Wilson. James has revealed that he is 'constantly battling with the fact that I'm constantly growing older' and how the pair 'wish we could go back to the days where... our biggest worry was whether our maths homework would be in on time'. "Times Change, Friends Leave and Life Doesn't Stop For Anybody" is about former member Ryan Mellor, with whom James has been friends since they were 14. 'This song is just, I suppose, about how much we miss him'.

"I Will Try" is about having a positive outlook on life. James has explained that he has 'a very negative outlook on the world' and that he can 'never really appreciate anything' so the song is a reminder to himself to try and look on the bright side. He continued; 'the line "I've got friends who have lost their fathers and they're much stronger men than me" refers mainly to Chris (Pennells, guitar), Jamie (manager) and my dear friend David Rice who have lost family members and yet still find a smile and appreciate all the upsides of life'. "Little White Lies" is about dishonesty. The song 'covers the way that lies eat away at my brain and cause me to almost lose my mind, yet I still keep making mistakes and bad decisions', according to James. He revealed little about the background of "Leeches", saying only that 'Leeches is about something terrible and unspeakable that happened to someone who once made me very happy'. Speaking about "Anemophobia", he said; 'the title of this song means a fear of wind, which I have, but the song on the whole though is about anxiety. ...This song was written when I was at my lowest point, I genuinely believed I was dying. ...The song is also about how lost I felt and still feel and how most days I don't feel like myself any more'. "Fifty Four" is about James' girlfriend. 'She is my only real sense of normality and I owe her more than I can write down in words for that'.

== Critical reception ==
Professional ratings
Review scores
Source	Rating
Alter the Press!	4.5 / 5
Dead Press!	5/10 stars
Glasswerk	Favourable
Kerrang!	4/5 stars
Ourzone Magazine	9/10 stars
Punktastic	4.5/5 stars
Rock Sound	9/10 stars

Fools and Worthless Liars was generally well received by critics, with many noting that the band had progressed significantly. Ian Winwood, writing for Kerrang!, expressed some reservations about the 'generic' nature of some of the choruses, but also remarked that 'there are also moments when Fools and Worthless Liars is quite superb, and represents a stark stride forward for its creators'. This viewpoint is supported by Andy Ritchie, writing for Rock Sound: 'forget what you know about Deaf Havana. ...everything up until this point has just been a practise run'. He commended the band for writing a 'confident and precise rock record'. Tom Aylott of Punktastic.com lauded the band for producing 'one of the best albums from a UK band this year' and noted that the 'most endearing quality isn't the strength of the standout tracks, it's that it doesn't really seem to have any trouble staying consistent until the end'. He, too, highlighted the progress the band had made, expressing his opinion that the album was 'mature'. The departure of Ryan Mellor and the subsequent transition was also a focal point of a review by Nick Robbins of Alter the Press!, who commented; 'the move away from a pigeonholed sound... has really given Deaf Havana the freedom to explore their sound'. He also praised Veck-Gilodi, describing him as a 'fantastic vocalist, with a large enough range to sound like two different singers'. He concluded; 'delivering on every level, on nearly every track, 'Fools And Worthless Liars' is one of 2011's best albums'. A less favourable review came from Oliver Thompson of Dead Press!. He agreed with many other critics that Fools and Worthless Liars was an opportunity for Deaf Havana to showcase their ability, but felt that 'the band appear dreary and fail to get out of second gear' on the album. He described the flow of the album as 'difficult', highlighting "Hunstanton Pier" as a 'weak filler track', and suggested that 'unless you were a die-hard Deaf Havana fan, you may find this album a tad tedious and eventually boring'. Ourzone Magazine and Glasswerk also gave the album positive reviews.

=== Accolades ===
- Ourzone Magazine – Albums of the Year 2011 – No. 2
- Rock Sound – 50 Best Albums of 2011 – No. 15
- Kerrang! Radio – The Best Album Covers of 2011 – No. 14

== Touring ==
Deaf Havana began playing their new songs live several months before the release of the album. Prior to Slam Dunk Festival, an event which took place in May 2011, vocalist James Veck-Gilodi announced that the band were 'going to play four or five new songs this weekend'. Songs that would later feature on Fools and Worthless Liars were also played live at Hit The Deck Festival, in April 2011, and when the band supported Feeder and You Me at Six in February and October respectively. A headline tour was organised for July 2011, with support coming from Not Advised and The First.

Leading up to the release of the album, Deaf Havana played two specially arranged shows. On 6 November, the day before the album was due to be released, they played Fools and Worthless Liars in its entirety at The Barfly, a small venue in London, alongside an acoustic set. Included in the price of a ticket was a copy of the album and a signed poster. The show was sold out within an hour of tickets going on sale. The following day, the day of the album's release, the band played a hometown show in Norwich.

After the release of the album, Deaf Havana spent a lot of time touring as a support band; they would not play a headline tour until April 2012, 5 months after the release of Fools and Worthless Liars. They began by supporting Skindred on their headline tour across Europe, followed by acting as support, alongside Tek-One, to Architects on their UK tour. Speaking before their April 2012 headline tour, which featured The Swellers and The Dangerous Summer as support, James Veck-Gilodi said: 'We are so excited to finally get out on the road and headline again. We've spent the last year or so writing and recording the album and been lucky enough to have some amazing support shows... but to be able to go out and play songs from Fools and Worthless Liars and headline is going to be great'. The band are due to play another headline tour, at larger venues, in November 2012. Support will come from There For Tomorrow and Canterbury. Deaf Havana had been due to travel to the US to support There For Tomorrow in September 2012, but due to a problem with the arrival of their visas, this did not take place.

Deaf Havana also played slots at a variety of festivals in support of the album; among them were Reading and Leeds, Pukkelpop, Hevy Festival and Takedown Festival. They are scheduled to play at Soundwave Festival, in Australia, in 2013.

== Singles ==
The first single to be taken from the album was "I'm A Bore, Mostly"; it was released on 9 October 2011 featuring the B-Side "We Used To Talk". The video for the single was released on 3 October 2011.

"Leeches" was the second single released from the album, as part of an EP, on 4 March 2012. The music video was released on 6 February 2012.

"Little White Lies" was the next single; it was released on 27 May 2012. The music video was released on 2 May 2012.

The fourth, and final, single from the album is "Hunstanton Pier". The music video for this track was released on 22 August 2012.

=== Track listing ===
I'm a Bore, Mostly – Single
No.	Title	Length
1.	"I'm a Bore, Mostly"	3:19
2.	"We Used to Talk"	4:44

Leeches – EP
No.	Title	Length
1.	"Leeches"	2:55
2.	"R'n'b******t"	2:46
3.	"I'm a Bore, Mostly" (Folk version)	3:49
4.	"Leeches" (Franklin remix)	3:29

Little White Lies – Single
No.	Title	Length
1.	"Little White Lies" (featuring vocals from Portia Conn)	3:17

=== Chart performance ===
"I'm a Bore, Mostly"

- UK Rock Chart – number 26

== Track listing ==
All songs written by James Veck Gilodi and Tom Ogden. All Lyrics written by James Veck Gilodi unless specified.

Fools and Worthless Liars
No.	Title	Length
1.	"The Past Six Years"	2:58
2.	"Youth in Retrospect"	3:22
3.	"I Will Try"	3:44
4.	"Little White Lies" (featuring vocals from Portia Conn)	3:13
5.	"Anemophobia"	4:15
6.	"I'm a Bore, Mostly"	3:20
7.	"Hunstanton Pier"	4:50
8.	"Filthy Rotten Scoundrel" (Lyrics by James Veck Gilodi and Matthew Veck Gilodi)	2:54
9.	"Things Change, Friends Leave and Life Doesn't Stop for Anybody"	3:18
10.	"Leeches"	2:55
11.	"The World or Nothing" (Lyrics by James Veck Gilodi and Matthew Veck Gilodi)	3:37
12.	"Nelson's County"	2:02
13.	"Fifty Four"	3:48
14.	"Cabin Fever" (iTunes bonus track)	2:41

== Personnel ==
The following personnel contributed to Fools And Worthless Liars:

=== Deaf Havana ===
- James Veck-Gilodi – lead vocals, gang vocals, lead, rhythm, slide and acoustic guitars and bass guitar
- Tom Ogden – drums, percussion, backing vocalist, gang vocals

Regular lead guitarist Chris Pennells and bassist Lee Wilson did not perform on the album due to work commitments.

=== Other musicians ===
- Portia Conn – vocals on "Little White Lies"
- Ian Maynard – piano on "Fifty Four" and "We Used To Talk"

=== Technical personnel ===
- Matty O'Grady – production, engineering
- Jon Mitchell – mixing
- Shawn Joseph – mastering
- Tom Barnes – photography
- Jon Barmby – artwork

== Chart performance ==
Chart (2011)	Peak position
UK Album Chart	49
UK Rock Album Chart	1
UK Indie Albums Chart	9

== Certifications ==
Region	Certification	Certified units/sales
United Kingdom (BPI)	Silver	60,000^{‡}
^{‡} Sales+streaming figures based on certification alone.
