= Old Souls (Deaf Havana album) =

Studio album by Deaf Havana
- Released: 16 September 2013
- Recorded: 2013
- Genre: Alternative rock, folk rock, pop rock, heartland rock
- Length: 48:45
- Label: BMG/Chrysalis, Razor & Tie
- Producer: Lee Batiuk

Deaf Havana chronology
Fools and Worthless Liars (2011)	Old Souls (2013)	All These Countless Nights (2017)

Singles from Old Souls
- 1. "Boston Square" Released: 14 May 2013; 2. "Mildred (Lost a Friend)" Released: 8 August 2013; 3. "22" Released: 30 June 2014

Old Souls is the third studio album from English band Deaf Havana. It was released on 16 September 2013 and marked another shift in direction from previous album Fools and Worthless Liars; with this release, they head to a more chorus-driven classic rock style of music. With singles "Boston Square" and "Mildred (Lost a Friend)" receiving international support from BBC Radio 1 DJ Zane Lowe's Hottest Record in the World along with interviews on the show with frontman James and newcomer Matthew Veck-Gilodi, as well as touring with artists such as Bruce Springsteen and Muse, the band have raised the profile of the album and seen a significant rise in their publicity and popularity since their last album release. They toured the album starting October 2013, where they were supported by ex-Busted singer-songwriter Charlie Simpson and Big Sixes. The album was released in the US on 21 January 2014.

== Background ==
After the release of the previous album Fools and Worthless Liars in 2011, the band rose to national attention; the album went to number 1 on the UK Rock Chart. The band played the Main Stages at the Reading and Leeds Festivals for the first time in 2012 and they supported You Me at Six for their Final Night of Sin at Wembley Arena. The band decided to yet again change the sound of their record from the pop-punk/alternative rock sound of their previous release. This change saw the addition to the line-up of frontman James Veck-Gilodi's brother Matthew (who had previously been performing with the band as a touring member) to play guitar and add additional vocals, and Max Britton as a pianist for the group, making the group a six-piece. Deaf Havana began composing new material to be featured on their third album in October 2012. On 25 January 2013, the band announced that the writing process was complete and that they would enter the studio a week later.

== Production and writing ==
The album was produced and engineered by Lee Batiuk and written, in the most part, by James and Matthew Veck-Gilodi. It also features choral vocals on "Caro Padre" by members of the London Youth Gospel Choir. With the lyrics of the previous release being almost entirely about the frontman, James Veck-Gilodi, this album lyrically reaches out to other people involved with his life. In early 2013, the band embarked on their acoustic tour An Evening with Deaf Havana. This tour mainly featured material from the alternative version of Fools and Worthless Liars. This was also the tour the featured the track "Saved" being played for the first time. It was rumoured during this highly successful tour, that the new, yet currently unnamed, album would be released "around September". However, no precise date was set or confirmed at this point. It was later revealed in that the new album would entitled Old Souls and was expected to be released on 16 September 2013.

== Themes ==
"Boston Square" is about a good friend of James Veck-Gilodi's called Phil who committed suicide. He was previously referred in the song "Hunstanton Pier" from their previous release in the lyric: "Back when my hair was long and Phil was still alive."

"Mildred (Lost a Friend)" was Matthew Veck-Gilodi's first song to be written solely by him. It's about a good friend of his from his very early childhood who moved away when they were young boys and the struggles he was facing while missing his friend.

"Saved" is about another friend of James Veck-Gilodi's who got his girlfriend pregnant when they were dating in college. Before the band played this song in the set of An Evening with Deaf Havana, Veck-Gilodi would introduce the song by saying "I love him, but he's a retard...a retard with a child."

"Kings Road Ghosts" is about the hometown of Veck-Gilodi's parents and how much the place has changed since he lived there and he describes the place he once loved has 'faded'. One lyric of the song mentions a recreational ground "that he knew so well" that had been replaced "with worn-out football pitches, tennis courts and empty space."

"Caro Padre" is the first time that James Veck-Gilodi opens up lyrically about his father. "Caro Padre" is the Italian translation for "Dear Father". This song sees Veck-Gilodi describe his father and the relationship they had together.

== Releases ==
The first single was "Boston Square". This was premiered as Zane Lowe's Hottest Record in the World for BBC Radio 1. It was released on 14 May 2013.

The second single was "Mildred (Lost a Friend)". Like the previous release, it was premiered as Zane Lowe's Hottest Record in the World for BBC Radio 1. It was released on 8 August 2013.

The third single to be released off the album was "22". A music video was recorded for it and released on 31 March 2014. The single itself accompanying the video was released on 30 June 2014.

The third release, "Kings Road Ghosts", was not a single. The band expressed that they knew they might "get in trouble" for releasing this but they just wanted to release more music. They released an unofficial video of touring montages.

"Speeding Cars" was leaked on to YouTube but removed shortly after. Through the short time it was available to the public, it did receive positive feedback.

== Track listing ==
All songs written by James Veck-Gilodi and Matthew Veck-Gilodi except "Lights" written by Deaf Havana. All lyrics written by James Veck-Gilodi unless specified.

Old Souls
No.	Title	Length
1.	"Boston Square"	3:34
2.	"Lights" (lyrics by James Veck-Gilodi and Matthew Veck-Gilodi)	4:57
3.	"Everybody's Dancing and I Want To Die"	3:59
4.	"Subterranean Bullshit Blues" (featuring vocals from Grace Barrett)	3:24
5.	"Night Drives" (lyrics by Catharina Davis)	4:19
6.	"22"	3:45
7.	"Speeding Cars"	4:34
8.	"Saved"	2:54
9.	"Mildred (Lost a Friend)" (lyrics by Matthew Veck-Gilodi)	4:16
10.	"Tuesday People"	4:06
11.	"Kings Road Ghosts"	3:18
12.	"Caro Padre"	5:39

== English Hearts ==
The band also released Amazon exclusive signed copies of Old Souls which included a feature-length documentary about the band and its history entitled English Hearts. This documentary covers the story of how Deaf Havana rose to fame and features the stories of how the members met, their first tour, Friends Like These, being the only song that people knew by them, and the addition of Matthew Veck-Gilodi and Max Britton to the band. It features interviews with the band members, their families, the record labels BMG and A Wolf At Your Door and former vocalist Ryan Mellor.

== Chart performance ==
Like its predecessor, the album topped the UK Rock Chart. The album debuted on the UK Albums Chart at number 9, a first top 10 album for the band.
