= Lived a Lie =

Single by You Me at Six

from the album Cavalier Youth
- Released: 3 September 2013
- Recorded: Los Angeles, California, U.S.
- Genre: Pop punk
- Length: 3:24
- Label: BMG Rights Management
- Songwriter: You Me at Six
- Producer: Neal Avron

You Me at Six singles chronology
"Reckless" (2012)	"Lived a Lie" (2013)	"Fresh Start Fever" (2013)

"Lived a Lie" is a single by British rock band You Me at Six. The single was released on 3 September 2013 as a digital download in the United Kingdom. It is the first single from their album Cavalier Youth. Following its release on iTunes, it debuted at Number 1 on the iTunes chart, their only song to do so. However, "Lived A Lie" debuted at Number 11 on the UK Singles Chart on the week ending 14 September 2013 due to lack of sales following from its release, making it their highest chart position in their home country to date.

== Background ==
On 2 September 2013, the band announced and premiered the first single to be off the new record, titled 'Lived a Lie'. The album was also revealed to be titled Cavalier Youth. The album would contain 12 tracks, including an interlude track. The music video to 'Lived a Lie' was made available to the world on the band's Vevo channel and UK fans can download the new track on iTunes shortly after. The song is featured in football video game FIFA 14 and the 2015 video game Guitar Hero Live.

== Track listing ==
Digital download
No.	Title	Length
1.	"Lived a Lie"	3:24

== Chart performance ==
=== Weekly charts ===
Chart (2013)	Peak position
Ireland (IRMA)	84
Scotland Singles (OCC)	9
UK Rock & Metal (OCC)	1
UK Indie (OCC)	2
UK Singles (OCC)	11
