= Deaf Havana =

English alternative rock band

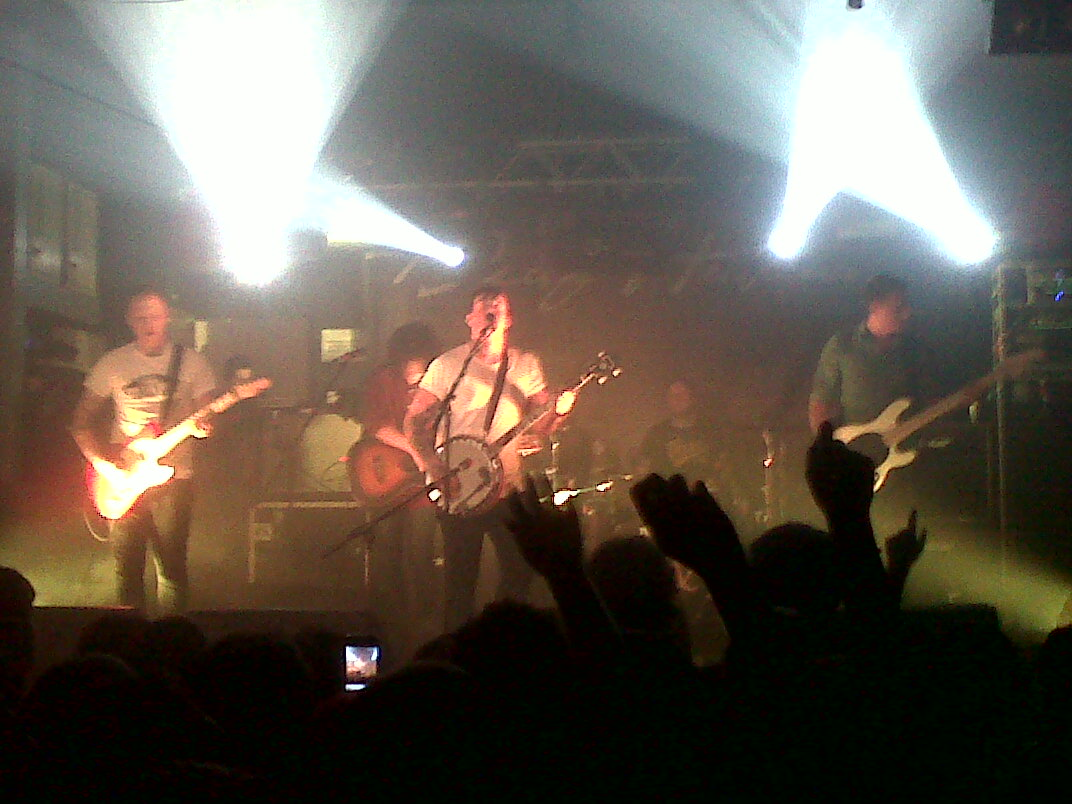
- Deaf Havana in 2012

Background information
- Origin: Hunstanton and King's Lynn, Norfolk, England
- Genres: Alternative rock; folk rock; post-hardcore (early)
- Years active: 2005–present
- Labels: A Wolf at Your Door Records; BMG; Razor & Tie; So Recordings
- Members: James Veck-Gilodi; Matthew Veck-Gilodi
- Past members: Ryan Mellor; Chris Pennells; Sebastian Spitz; Max Britton; Lee Wilson; Tom Ogden
- Website: deafhavana.com

Deaf Havana are an English alternative rock band from Hunstanton and King's Lynn, Norfolk, England. The band was formed in 2005 at the King's Lynn campus of The College of West Anglia.

== Biography ==
=== Early days (2005–2008) ===
Deaf Havana was formed when the original members met at the King's Lynn campus of The College of West Anglia. The band's roots can, however, be traced back much further with Ryan Mellor, James Veck-Gilodi and Lee Wilson all attending Smithdon High School and playing together in various local scene bands. At college, these members were joined by Tom Ogden and Sebastian Spitz. This early lineup saw Veck-Gilodi singing and Mellor taking guitar and vocal duties. The name "Deaf Havana" came from former guitarist Sebastian Spitz, however the name itself has no literal meaning. The band wrote songs and a demo White Lines But No Camera was recorded in August 2006 at The Lodge, Northampton. The band toured this lineup until Chris Pennells replaced Spitz. Pennells was formerly a member of the band Something About Dave. Around the same time, Mellor handed over guitar parts to Veck-Gilodi, and took on the lead role.

In late 2006, the band began writing songs for their debut EP, entitled Evangeline. Two songs were roughly recorded, titled "The Smiles Were Forced" and "Where It Begins", which were uploaded onto the band's Myspace page. The EP was soon recorded, with "The Smiles Were Forced" being dropped from the EP's track listing. Its artwork is by Josh Brown who later had a song dedicated to him by the band called "Josh Brown, Don't Talk to Strangers", which was actually an early demo for the song "They Call It the Easy Life", featured on It's Called the Easy Life. "For Stories Sake" was previously featured on the band's debut digital EP White Lines But No Camera with the slightly altered title "For the Stories Sake". "Tell Me More Georgie Boy" is the only song from any previous release to make it onto Meet Me Halfway, at Least, and is now called "Another Day in This House".

=== Wolf at Your Door Records (2008–2010) ===
==== It's Called the Easy Life ====
Beginning in October 2007, the band began work on new songs, which eventually were released on It's Called the Easy Life. On 21 June 2008, the band announced signing a deal consisting of one EP and two albums with Wolf at Your Door Records owner Kevin 'Wolfie' Horak, as well as the recording date for said debut EP, now titled It's Called the Easy Life. The EP was eventually recorded by Jonny Renshaw from Devil Sold His Soul and was mixed by Matt O'Grady (You Me at Six, Architects) and released in October 2008. The EP received strong reviews from various musical publications, following which the band begin to receive some recognition. January 2009 saw the band complete a UK wide tour with We Are the Ocean and The Urgency, and the release of their first music video for the song "Oh Howard, You Crack Me Up".

==== Meet Me Halfway, at Least ====
On 25 May 2009, the band entered the studio to record their debut studio album, Meet Me Halfway, at Least, with producer Matt O'Grady. The album was released for pre-order from Wolf at Your Door Records on 7 September 2009, and was released on iTunes and shops on 5 October 2009. Two singles have been taken from this album. "Friends Like These" was released, with B-side "Hey Baby, This Is Our Song", on 17 August 2009, for digital download. A video was also released for this single. Their second single, "Nicotine and Alcohol Saved My Life" was released on 15 March 2010, also via digital download. The single contains a remix of "Friends Like These" by Essex band Kenai. Its music video was first shown on music channels and online from 22 February 2010. Before the release of the album, Deaf Havana embarked on the UK Metal Hammer Introducing Tour along with Young Guns and The Casino Brawl. A week after the final date for this tour, Deaf Havana played an album release party show in hometown King's Lynn, with support from Underline the Sky and All Forgotten.

The band embarked several tours across the UK and Europe in 2010, including a headlining UK mini tour with All Forgotten and Francesqa in March, a European tour with Emery from March through to April, as well as a support slot on Emarosa's UK tour in May. Just prior to the mini tour with All Forgotten, the band announced that Mellor would not be embarking on these tours, due to personal circumstances, with Max d'Albiac from Brides replacing him. Mellor left the band on 10 May 2010, due to the same personal problems that caused him to pull out of 2010 tours. Deaf Havana decided to continue as a four piece and a replacement for Mellor was not sought.

=== BMG (2011–2014) ===
==== Fools and Worthless Liars ====
'Fools and Worthless Liars' was again Produced and Engineered by Matt O'Grady at his home studios in Woking, Surrey, and mixed by John Mitchell. 'Hunstanton Pier' and 'Little White Lies' single, video and radio edits were mixed by Matt O'Grady, with the latter having half the vocal takes from a demo version of the track replacing the album vocal takes as both O'Grady and Veck-Gilodi agreed they were better suited to the track.

The band began the follow-up to 2009's Meet Me Halfway, at Least in early 2010. They released a new demo track on Myspace and Facebook, entitled "My Life Is Average". On 29 and 30 May 2010, Deaf Havana played on the Kerrang! Introducing Stage at the Slam Dunk Festival at University of Hertfordshire, Hatfield and University of Leeds, respectively. At these shows, the band opened with an untitled new song. On 13 August 2010, the band released a new demo track through their Facebook page entitled "Home Sweet Home". The band supported You Me at Six, along with Kids in Glass Houses and The Blackout, for a Halloween special at The Regal in Oxford. The band played two new songs on their headline tour in the UK, entitled "Pop" and "I Will Try", and also announced that they had been recording for their new album but have "no idea" when it is to be released, although a 2011 release was said to be likely.

At the band's 17 December 2010 show at the Liverpool Masque Loft, a new song was played, tentatively named "Down Syndrome Pigs". They also played 3 songs at Maida Vale Studios, two of which were "Pop" & "I Will Try". Live videos of many of these new songs, including "Vines" and "Youth in Retrospect", appeared on various media sites. Previously released material such as "The World or Nothing", "I'm A Bore, Mostly", "Home, Sweet Home", "My Life is Average" and "Smiles All Around" were also recorded live by fans, although the latter three did not feature on Fools and Worthless Liars. The band confirmed via Twitter on 19 February 2011, that the recording of their second full-length album was under way and that the album was being recorded with producer/engineer Matt O'Grady (You Me at Six, Fastlane) in Woking, Surrey. Recording was completed in late summer 2011.

On 20 May 2011, the band released the first song, called "The World or Nothing", from their untitled second album. The song was not released as a single, but the song is accompanied by a video made from footage taken at Hit The Deck Festival, directed by Jon Stone. The first single from the album was confirmed to be "I'm A Bore, Mostly" on 30 August 2011. It was played on BBC Radio 1 by Zane Lowe and the following week by Sara Cox. The title of the album, Fools and Worthless Liars was made public on 23 September 2011. Deaf Havana also released a music video for the single on 11 October 2011, which accumulated over 20,000 plays on the day of release. They then supported fellow British rockers You Me at Six on tour that month. Fools and Worthless Liars was released on 7 November 2011, coinciding with London Barfly and Norwich Arts Centre release gigs. The album peaked at number 1 on the UK Rock Album Chart. In late November and early December 2011, the band toured Europe as direct support to Skindred before returning to the UK to support Architects on their tour through mid December. The band performed their own UK headline tour through April 2012, with support from The Swellers and The Dangerous Summer. They also performed another headline tour in November 2012, with support from Canterbury and There For Tomorrow.

The band re-recorded an alternative version of Fools and Worthless Liars which was released on 22 October 2012. The Fools and Worthless Liars Deluxe Edition album reached number 51 in the UK Albums Chart (reaching number 28 mid-week). Lead singer, James-Veck Gilodi, expressed his views about his personal influences in the Fools and Worthless Liars Deluxe Documentary saying that he "wanted to do something that was more musical interesting" and record something that was "truer" to the bands actual influences. After playing the St Pancras Station Festival, from which the band thought "went well" and was "thoroughly enjoyable", the band set about re-recording each song on Fools and Worthless Liars hoping to show off their musicianship that may not have come across on the album by using different instruments, sounds and genres.

==== Old Souls ====
In October 2012, Deaf Havana began composing new material to be featured on their third album. On 25 January 2013, the band announced that the writing process was complete and that they would enter the studio a week later. It was rumoured, during the highly successful An Evening With Deaf Havana – Unplugged that the new, yet currently unnamed, album would be released "around September". However, no precise date was set or confirmed at this point. It was later revealed in 2012 that the new album would be entitled Old Souls and was to be produced by Lee Batiuk. It was announced to be released on 16 September 2013. Moreover, the band created a feature-length documentary, entitled English Hearts, which was released as a CD/DVD combination on the deluxe version of Old Souls. The feature documented the history of the band, in their own words, and was directed by Jon Stone, a director who had previously filmed the band performing "The World or Nothing" at Hit the Deck Festival.

The band received several high-profile radio plays in the lead up to the album release whilst the band also aired several previews through social media such as Facebook and Twitter. The song "Boston Square" was premiered by Radio One DJ Zane Lowe as his Hottest Record in the World on 14 May 2013. This release which was accompanied with an interview with James Veck-Gilodi. The band coincidentally announced their first partnership with YouTube music video service Vevo, and released the corresponding video for "Boston Square". The band followed up the positive feedback by releasing the track "Speeding Cars" on 18 July 2013, and track which also received positive feedback. On 1 August 2013, the band released another track, entitled "Kings Road Ghosts", despite the band acknowledging "they might get into trouble" for releasing the track early. On 8 August 2013, the band were again invited Zane Lowe's Radio 1 show to premiere their new single "Mildred (Lost a Friend)" as the Hottest Record in the World. Matt Veck-Gilodi supplied the interview on the behalf of the band and was interviewed by Radio 1 DJ Huw Stephens, who was deputising for Zane Lowe.

Throughout this period, the band continued to perform live and were reward for recent success with place supporting Bruce Springsteen at the annual Hard Rock Calling Festival and Muse on the German part of their tour. They were also invited to play on the NME/BBC Radio 1 Stage at the 2013 Reading and Leeds Festivals. On an individual level, the band announced their biggest ever headline tour to take place at eight locations across the UK in October 2013 finishing at The Roundhouse in London. It was announced that, on their UK tour, the band will be supported by singer/songwriter Charlie Simpson and Big Sixes, who supported them on their An Evening with Deaf Havana – Unplugged tour. Old Souls was released in the United States on 21 January 2014.

=== So Recordings (2015–present) ===
==== All These Countless Nights ====
Ahead of their UK tour in November 2015, Deaf Havana released the track "Cassiopeia" from their fourth album, which was originally set to be released in 2016.

In July 2016, the band released the single "Sing" and announced that their album would be released in early 2017 on So Recordings. During their set at Reading and Leeds 2016, the band announced that the album is titled All These Countless Nights and announced its release date as 27 January 2017. Shortly after their Reading and Leeds appearance, the band announced their first UK tour in over 2 years.

On 9 October, the second single from the album, "Trigger", premiered on BBC Radio 1 as Daniel P Carter's Rockest Record. The song had originally premiered in 2014 on the band's European tour, at which time the band had planned to record new material but were dropped from their record label, BMG.

==== Rituals ====
Following their top-five album All These Countless Nights, Rituals was written as a challenge taken up by James Veck-Gilodi (vocals) and Phil Gornell (producer) to subvert the band's writing process, and present songs representative of the band in present.

Rituals is the result of throwing out the 'Deaf Havana rulebook': James picked song titles before digitally writing tracks that fit the titles, then had the band come in to play the written parts. Working like this felt backwards to James, who'd previously only written songs on his acoustic guitar, with continuous input from the rest of the band. They set themselves a deadline of April to finish writing, and if any of it was any good, they would make it available by August of that year.

A recurring theme on the album is one of struggle and redemption. The music is in turn with introspective and joyous, with help form the London Contemporary Voice Choir, who feature on five tracks. The band performed with the choir at their intimate show at London's Union Chapel for the War Child charity as part of the Brit Awards gigs.

The theme of redemption ties into the art the band have wrapped into the album cover, a series by the visual artist Wolf James entitled My Love Is Lethal (A personal series dedicated to Letting Go).

==== The Present Is a Foreign Land ====
On 25 November 2021, the band released a statement that while they intended to break up in early 2020, instead James and Matthew will continue on as a duo; Lee Wilson and Tom Ogden left the band.

The Present Is a Foreign Land was announced on 21 January 2022 for a 15 July 2022 release; the album's first single, "Going Clear", releasing the same day.

==== We're Never Getting Out ====
On 8 May 2025, the band announced their new album We're Never Getting Out - along with the release of the album's first single "Lawn Tennis".

== Band members ==
Current

- James Veck-Gilodi – lead vocals, rhythm guitar (2005–present)
- Matthew Veck-Gilodi – lead guitar, backing vocals (2015–present); rhythm guitar, backing vocals (touring 2012; 2013–2015)

Former

- Ryan Mellor – unclean vocals (2005–2010, guest 2011 & 2026)
- Sebastian Spitz – lead guitar (2005)
- Chris Pennells – lead guitar (2006–2015)
- Max Britton – keyboards, piano, backing vocals, acoustic guitar, percussion (touring 2012; 2013–2018)
- Lee Wilson – bass guitar (2005–2021)
- Tom Ogden – drums, percussion, backing vocals (2005–2021)

== Discography ==
=== Albums ===
Year	Title	Peak chart positions	Label
Year	Title	UK	Label
2009	Meet Me Halfway, at Least	—	A Wolf at Your Door Records
2011	Fools and Worthless Liars	49	BMG/Chrysalis
2013	Old Souls	9	BMG/Chrysalis, Razor & Tie
2017	All These Countless Nights	5	So Recordings
2018	Rituals	8	So Recordings
2019	Live at Brixton Academy	—	So Recordings
2022	The Present Is a Foreign Land	23	So Recordings
2023	Deaf Havana – Songs from the Roundhouse	—	So Recordings
2025	We're Never Getting Out	71	So Recordings

=== Extended plays ===
Year	Title	Label
2005	Sweet Sunset	Self-released
2005	Ok, This Time We Mean It	Self-released
2006	White Lines, But No Camera EP	Self-released
2007	Where It Begins	Self-released
2007	Evangeline EP	Self-released
2008	Love by the Riverside EP	Self-released
2008	It's Called the Easy Life	A Wolf at Your Door Records
2012	Leeches EP	BMG/Chrysalis
2025	Tracing Lines	SO Recordings

=== Singles ===
Single	Year	Album
"Oh Howard, You Crack Me Up"	2009	It's Called the Easy Life
"Friends Like These"	2009	Meet Me Halfway, at Least
"Nicotine and Alcohol Saved My Life"	2010	Meet Me Halfway, at Least
"I'm a Bore, Mostly"	2011	Fools and Worthless Liars
"Leeches"	2012	Fools and Worthless Liars
"Little White Lies" (featuring Portia Conn)	2012	Fools and Worthless Liars
"Hunstanton Pier"	2012	Fools and Worthless Liars
"Boston Square"	2013	Old Souls
"Mildred (Lost a Friend)"	2013	Old Souls
"22"	2014	Old Souls
"Sing"	2016	All These Countless Nights
"Trigger"	2017	All These Countless Nights
"Fever"	2017	All These Countless Nights
"Sinner"	2018	Rituals
"Going Clear"	2022	The Present Is a Foreign Land
"Kids"	2022	The Present Is a Foreign Land
"On The Wire"	2022	The Present Is a Foreign Land
"Lawn Tennis"	2025	We're Never Getting Out
"—" denotes a single that did not chart or was not released.

== Music videos ==
List of videos, showing year released and director
Title	Year	Director
"Oh Howard, You Crack Me Up"	2009	
"Friends Like These"	2009	www.sitcomsoldiers.com
"Nicotine and Alcohol Saved My Life"	2010	www.sitcomsoldiers.com
"I'm a Bore, Mostly"	2011	www.sitcomsoldiers.com
"Leeches"	2012	Stuart Birchall
"Little White Lies"	2012	
"Hunstanton Pier"	2012	Duncan Rice
"Boston Square"	2013	Frederick Lloyd
"Mildred (Lost a Friend)"	2013	Frederick Lloyd
"22"	2014	
"Sing"	2016	A.J. Gómez
"Trigger"	2017	A.J. Gómez
"Fever"	2017	A.J. Gómez
"Going Clear"	2022	Anthony Neale
"Kids"	2022	Jon Stone
"On The Wire"	2022	Jon Stone
