= Chiddy Bang discography =

- Studio albums: 1
- Extended plays: 2
- Mixtapes: 3
- Singles: 4
- Music videos: 8

The discography of American alternative hip hop band from Philadelphia, Pennsylvania Chiddy Bang consists of one studio album, four singles.

== Albums ==
=== Studio albums ===
Title	Year	Peak chart positions						
Title	Year	US	US R&B	US Rap	AUS	CAN	SWI	UK
Breakfast	Released: February 21, 2012; Label: Virgin, I.R.S.; Format: CD, digital download	8	2	2	68	51	50	51

=== Mixtapes ===
- The Swelly Express (2009)
- Air Swell (2010)
- Peanut Butter and Swelly (2011)

== Extended plays ==
Title	Details	Peak chart positions			
Title	Details	US	US R&B	US Rap	AUS
Opposite of Adults	Released: May 18, 2010; Label: Parlophone America; Format: CD	—	—	—	—
The Preview	Released: October 1, 2010; Label: Parlophone America; Format: CD	76	17	11	59
"—" denotes a title that did not chart, or was not released in that territory.

== Singles ==
=== As lead artist ===
Title	Year	Peak chart positions										Album
Title	Year	US	AUS	AUT	GER	IRE	JAP	NZ	SCO	SWI	UK	Album
"Opposite of Adults"	2010	90	10	60	81	10	57	8	10	18	12	Chiddy Bang: The Preview
"Truth"	2010	—	—	—	—	—	—	—	—	—	50	Chiddy Bang: The Preview
"Mind Your Manners" (featuring Icona Pop) (Note: "Mind Your Manners" did not enter the Billboard Hot 100, but peaked at number 15 on the Bubbling Under Hot 100 Singles chart, which acts as a 25-song extension to the Hot 100.)	2011	115	11	—	—	33	—	32	—	—	183	Breakfast
"Ray Charles"	2011	—	54	—	88	20	—	—	—	—	13	Breakfast
"—" denotes a title that did not chart, or was not released in that territory.

=== As featured artist ===
Title	Year	Peak chart positions				Album
Title	Year	US	IRE	SCO	UK	Album
"Rescue Me" (You Me at Six featuring Chiddy)	2011	—	50	16	21	Breakfast
"Children" (VV Brown featuring Chiddy)	2011	—	—	—	—	Lollipops & Politics
"Heart Skips a Beat" (Olly Murs featuring Chiddy Bang)	2012	96	6	2	1	Right Place Right Time (US version)
"Shine" (Outasight featuring Chiddy Bang)	2012	—	—	—	—	Nights Like These
"Fame Is For Assholes" (Hoodie Allen featuring Chiddy)	2013	—	—	—	—	Crew Cuts
"—" denotes a title that did not chart, or was not released in that territory.

=== Other charted songs ===
Title	Year	Peak chart positions		Album
Title	Year	US	AUS	Album
"Handclaps & Guitars" (Note: "Handclaps & Guitars" did not enter the Billboard Hot 100, but peaked at number 17 on the Bubbling Under Hot 100 Singles chart, which acts as a 25-song extension to the Hot 100.)	2012	117	—	Breakfast
"Happening"	2012	—	34	Breakfast
"—" denotes a title that did not chart, or was not released in that territory.

=== Promotional singles ===
Song	Year	Album
"The Good Life"	2010	Chiddy Bang: The Preview

== Music videos ==
Song	Year	Director	Reference
"The Opposite of Adults"	2010	Ben Dickinson + Duncan Skiles	
"Truth"	2010	Ben Dickinson + Duncan Skiles	
"Pass Out"	2010	Ben Nicholas + Minka Farthing-Kohl	
"Sooner or Later"	2010	Kristopher Rey-Talley	—N/a
"Dream Chasin'"	2010	Kristopher Rey-Talley	—N/a
"The Good Life"	2010	—N/a	—N/a
"Too Fake" (Big Sean featuring Chiddy Bang)	2011	Mike Carson	
"Ray Charles"	2012	Alan Ferguson	
"By Your Side"	2012	Noah Beresin	
