= Sinners Never Sleep =

2011 studio album by You Me at Six

Studio album by You Me at Six
- Released: 3 October 2011
- Recorded: March–May 2011
- Studios: Sunset Sound; The Sound Factory; EastWest, Los Angeles, California
- Genres: Pop rock; alternative rock
- Length: 47:57
- Label: Virgin
- Producer: Garth Richardson

You Me at Six chronology
Hold Me Down (2010)	Sinners Never Sleep (2011)	Cavalier Youth (2014)

Singles from Sinners Never Sleep
- 1. "Loverboy" Released: 23 September 2011 (EP); 2. "Bite My Tongue" Released: 2 December 2011; 3. "No One Does It Better" Released: 6 April 2012; 4. "Reckless" Released: 22 October 2012

Sinners Never Sleep is the third studio album by English rock band You Me at Six. It was released on 3 October 2011 through Virgin Records. While touring in support of their second studio album Hold Me Down (2010), the band wrote slow-tempo material and heavy-sounding songs. Between March and May 2011, they recorded with producer Garth Richardson at Sunset Sound and The Sound Factory in Los Angeles, California. Partway through the process, vocalist Josh Franceschi suffered a panic attack, which resulted in him being hospitalized and the band losing time in the studio. Described as an pop rock and alternative rock album, Sinners Never Sleep was a departure from the pop punk sound of their previous releases.

The lead single from Sinners Never Sleep, "Loverboy", was released as part an extended play (EP) in September 2011. Bookending the release, You Me at Six went on a co-headlining Australian tour with We the Kings and a headlining tour of the United Kingdom. "Bite My Tongue" was released as the second single from the album in December 2011. Sinners Never Sleep was released in the United States in January 2012, coinciding with a co-headlining US tour with the Swellers. You Me at Six then toured Australia as part of the Soundwave festival, and then the UK. "No One Does It Better" was released as the third single from the album in April 2012, followed by "Reckless" as the fourth in October 2012, which preceded a one-off headlining show at Wembley Arena.

Sinners Never Sleep received generally positive reviews from music critics, some of whom complimented You Me at Six's songwriting and their change in style. The album charted at number three in the UK, number 28 in Australia, and number 39 in Ireland. "Loverboy" and "No One Does It Better" charted at number 39 and 92, respectively, on the UK Singles Chart. Sinners Never Sleep has been certified gold in the UK; by January 2017, it had sold over 160,000 copies in that country. "Bite My Tongue" was certified silver in the UK in March 2024.

== Background and writing ==
You Me at Six's second studio album Hold Me Down, which was released in January 2010, reached number five in the UK Albums Chart – one of the highest chart positions for a rock band that year. Extensive touring led to tensions within the band, as the members became sick of one another. In April 2010, vocalist Josh Franceschi and guitarists Max Helyer and Chris Miller spent time writing new songs together, while bassist Matt Barnes and drummer Dan Flint went to Las Vegas for a break. Following this, the band made their second appearance on Warped Tour; their popularity in the US had grown since their first appearance. While on the trek, Franceschi said their next album would be influenced by acts to whom they were listening, such as the Ghost Inside, A Loss for Words and Parkway Drive. He thought the next release could be "a bit heavier" than their earlier work because they preferred listening to heavy music while on tour. In August 2010, Franceschi announced that You Me at Six would be writing for a new album as early as November, remarking that bands cannot tour for two years straight without new songs. He said some of the material they had up to that point was slow and mixed together the sounds of Brand New, Coldplay and Jimmy Eat World.

By December 2010, You Me at Six had written 12 songs, four of which were complete. In the same month, the band showed their label Virgin Records demos of the new material. They were concerned the label might react negatively to the heavier-sounding songs and halt their recording plans, but the label was very positive about the tracks. They were aiming in a generalized rock direction, in the vein of Foo Fighters and Kings of Leon; Franceschi admired that Jimmy Eat World did that between their Clarity (1999) and Chase This Light (2007) albums while retaining their identity. In February 2011, You Me at Six released "Rescue Me", a collaboration with Chiddy Bang, as a stop-gap release. Rumours began circulating that they would be collaborating with other artists for their next album. In the lead up to recording, Helyer said they corralled 16 songs, but were concerned if they had enough material for their next album. He had stockpiled a handful of guitar riffs from years prior, one of which evolved into "This Is the First Thing".

== Production ==
=== Pre-production and initial tracking ===
Franceschi wished to tour some more, while the remainder of You Me at Six wanted to continue working away. They compromised by agreeing to record their next album and then embark on touring. When the band were seeking producers, Garth Richardson met them at their show at the Hammersmith Apollo in London. They ultimately picked him as Miller was impressed with his work with Rage Against the Machine. After making their previous two albums in their home country, they opted to record in the United States. In an effort to challenge themselves, You Me at Six wanted to record their next album outside the UK. Their label initially suggested a secluded forest location, a proposal that the extroverted band rejected, with Franceschi saying that they would "probably end up killing each other" if they could not interact with other people. The band considered recording in Los Angeles, California, which they thought "wouldn't just be a different recording space and different recording experience, but also a life experience". The band subsequently rented apartments in Hollywood. They did pre-production for the first time with Richardson and performed their songs with him present. Richardson delivered both positive and negative critique of what he heard, and he and the band brainstormed methods of improvement for some of the songs. According to Franceschi, only one track was substantially changed and Richardson suggested minor corrections to others, such as adding another chorus or an additional bar in a verse.

Sessions mainly took place at Sunset Sound and The Sound Factory in Los Angeles, California, from March to May 2011. You Me at Six were scheduled to support Parkway Drive in Australia in May but were forced to pull out because the album was not completed in time. Richardson produced the album, with Ben Kaplan in charge of recording. The band had previously worked with John Mitchell. Franceschi said they were "a very hands-on" band who had "almost recorded [albums] ourselves". Working with Richardson was "slightly different" because he brought in a team of people. Before recording drums, they had two or three technicians setting up the kit and figuring out the drum sounds, which were done analogue tape. Flint played on a Gretsch kit, with which he was impressed. He said he did not need to trigger the drum kit because "it sounded phenomenal by itself". The band's friends visited them during recording and they partied every evening. Though later Helyer grew wary of this, Franceschi reasoned without their friends' visits, the band would hate the recording process; "it was that shit".

=== Franceschi's panic attack and later recording ===
During the third week of recording, Franceschi took a conference call with the band's manager, who told him Richardson was unhappy with the way the sessions were progressing. Their manager said they would send all of the band members except Franceschi home and leave him to record the rest of the parts. Franceschi said he would not be able to carry the weight of the rest of his bandmates and did not need "this lead singer syndrome ego boost". Later that day, Franceschi and O'Grady argued with Richardson and Franceschi received a call saying recording was over and that the band must return to the UK. Following this, Franceschi learned that his tweet about seeing Noel Gallagher in the studio had accidentally leaked the news that a former Oasis member was recording a solo album. He then received the news You Me at Six's upcoming two-tour support slot with Blink-182 was cancelled. All of these events in the span of one day resulted in Franceschi having a panic attack that resulted in his hospitalization. It cost the band 12 days in the studio, before he decided to discharge himself from the hospital. Franceschi's vocal parts were recorded in the following two to three weeks.

Miller later said You Me at Six were unable to work easily with the production team. On occasion, he would go to record his parts and would still be waiting to record six hours later. Helyer expressed similar frustration after returning to their apartment and saying; "Fuck this! We've paid a lot of money to be here and record an album and I'm not getting to do my work." Despite this, Helyer said Richardson had an influence on the material, helping to push him as a guitarist. He gave them suggestions and advice, in addition to aiding the refinement of their sound. Helyer ultimately recorded his parts over three weeks. Pro Tools editing was done by Kaplan, Nick Rowe and Richardson. Geoff Neale and Clint Welander acted as assistant engineers, and additional engineering was done by Matt O'Grady, Rowe, Richardson and Welanders. They brought over O'Grady, who they collaborated with on their first two albums, to assist Franceschi with his vocals.

Strings and brass, which were arranged and conducted by Jeremy Rubolino, were recorded at EastWest Studios in Los Angeles by Jorge Velasco with assistant engineer Jeff Ellis. Kaplan performed keyboards and did programming, while Damian Taylor did programming on "When We Were Younger". Oliver Sykes of Bring Me the Horizon, who recorded his part earlier in April 2011, appears on "Bite My Tongue" and Winston McCall of Parkway Drive appears on "Time Is Money". Franceschi said the band wanted to add "an extra layer of aggression" to both of these tracks, and brought in Sykes and McCall. Some members of You Me at Six had previously stated at Sykes' residence during their early years, while Franceschi also worked with Bring Me the Horizon the previous year on one of their songs. 19 songs were recorded in total, with 12 ultimately making the final album. The recordings were originally mixed by Andy Wallace, but the final versions were mixed by Mitchell and O'Grady at the latter's home studio in Woking, Surrey, before they were mastered by Christian Wright at Abbey Road Studios.

== Composition ==
=== Overview ===
Sinners Never Sleep saw You Me at Six move away from the pop punk sound of their earlier material, exchanging it with pop rock and heavier alternative rock, and integrating elements of heavy metal. Franceschi felt they seemed out of step with the pop punk scene in the UK. Author Neil Daniels, in his book You Me at Six – Never Hold an Underdog Down (2015), wrote that they "wanted to be taken out of the teen-friendly pop-punk scene, quite literally. ... They wanted to go into Foo Fighters territory; it's rock music that's accessible to a broad spectrum of music fans". One member of the band would come up with an idea, such as a guitar riff or a vocal melody, and the rest of the band would develop the idea at practice sessions. During the writing phase, one member might suggest changing the drum or guitar parts. Franceschi said with Hold Me Down, they wanted to make a better-produced version of their debut studio album Take Off Your Colours (2008). With Sinners Never Sleep, the band focussed on showcasing a wide variety of sounds, incorporating new instrumentation such as strings, horns, pianos and samples into their work. According to Franceschi, some of the songs "sound like they could be on a Coldplay or Snow Patrol album". The band members wrote songs that would appeal to both their existing fanbase and a potential new audience.

You Me at Six were originally going to name the album Little Death, based on the track of the same name, until their label and management said it meant "orgasm" in French. One individual said that the name made them think about their own daughter getting abducted. After toying with other names, the band settled on Sinners Never Sleep. They wanted to avoid continuing the American-esque topics that were prevalent on their preceding two albums, alongside the usual themes of parting and going after girls. The first tracks they worked on were "Loverboy", "Bite My Tongue", and "When We Were Younger". Franceschi did not write any lyrics for the songs until they went to America; he focussed and wrote words to the demo recordings while the rest of the members recorded their instruments. This way of working was new for Franceschi, who previously wrote lyrics and melodies while the band were writing the songs.

=== Songs ===
The idea for "Loverboy" came from Barnes; the glam rock track is anchored around his bass parts. The "da da da da" part came from Franceschi, who was inspired by sing-alongs at football games. He said the track served as a bridge between Hold Me Down and where they wanted to explore next musically. "Jaws on the Floor" continues the tempo of the previous track, and showcases the band's heavy sound. Franceschi said "Bite My Tongue" came from "a place of frustration". It is about his relationship with his bandmates and other people when they were making the album, and details a time when the band almost broke-up. Sykes recorded his part of the song in 20 minutes across three takes. The new wave-influenced "This Is the First Thing" was one of the first tracks the band demoed for the album; Flint said it reminded him of casinos. It is reminiscent of some of the songs on Hold Me Down due the track's lyrics on teenage romance. Franceschi said he tried to "make it less teenage angsty and more sophisticated" as he was expanding his creative range during the time. He called "No Ones Does It Better" and "Crash" "pretty chilled-out" and in similar style to the work of Snow Patrol and Coldplay.

Franceschi clarified that "No Ones Does It Better" is about believing in one's self, as fans had mistaken it as being a love song. "Little Death" was inspired by the death of Flint's father, which occurred before the release of Hold Me Down. As the members were comforting Flint, Franceschi suggested writing a song about it. The band had forgotten about the song but rediscovered it late in the recording process for Sinners Never Sleep. The song follows the quiet verse/loud chorus structure; Franceschi's vocals recall those of Nickelback frontman Chad Kroeger. The soft rock track "Crash" features strings and is reminiscent of the music of the Goo Goo Dolls and Stars. Franceschi wanted it to be the "Fireworks" of Sinners Never Sleep, referring to the closing track of Hold Me Down. "Reckless" went through a series of name changes throughout its development. It was originally titled "Don't Hold Your Breath" but was altered when the band realized Nicole Scherzinger has a track with the same title. It was then changed to "The Best You've Never Had" until they realized the Swellers and Beyoncé had songs with similar names. At this point, the song was finally named "Reckless"; Barnes said it has the most resemblance to the material on Hold Me Down.

The riff of "Time Is Money", which had been compared to the work of Pendulum with an From Autumn to Ashes-like breakdown, was written while the band were recording Hold Me Down but was left off at Franceschi's suggestion. While recording the song for Sinners Never Sleep, the song lacked a chorus, which was quickly written while drums were being recorded. After the melody for it had been written, they sent the track to McCall, who was a friend of the band. For his part, Franceschi sent him a note that read "If Boneyards or Carrion was a You Me At Six song". It was almost left off Sinners Never Sleep due to its heavy sound. The Jimmy Eat World-esque ballad "Little Bit of Truth" is about the band's relationship with their fans. Franceschi explained: "I wanted to feel like what I'm doing as a frontman is right". "The Dilemma" takes its name from the film The Dilemma (2011), and was compared to the work of Panic! at the Disco. It harkened back to the emo direction of their debut album. When Franceschi came up with the first verse and showed it to the rest of the band, he suggested they do something theatrical with it. "When We Were Younger" is a slowly building track, and is about Franceschi's relationship with his parents; Barnes said it was their most experimental song.

== Release ==
As part of the marketing, You Me at Six's website featured a timer that counted down across five days, and on 1 August 2011, Sinners Never Sleep was announced for release in two months' time, with its track listing and artwork being revealed. "Loverboy" was made available for streaming on 12 August 2011. Filming for the "Loverboy" music video was postponed due to the London riots, before ultimately commencing in August 2011. The video, directed by Tim Matthia, was released on 30 August 2011; it features each of the band members being manhandled police officers, cut with footage of them performing. The song was released as an extended play (EP) on 23 September with instrumental and acoustic versions of "Loverboy" and "Moon Child" as additional tracks. Sinners Never Sleep was released on 3 October 2011. It was accompanied by the behind-the-scenes documentary Bite My Tongue, which chronicles You Me at Six's history from their first practice session to the recording of Sinners Never Sleep. As they knew they were going to record in Los Angeles, they told their label about wishing to make a documentary, which was also directed by Matthia. The iTunes edition includes the bonus track "Takes One to Know One", and the video for "Loverboy" and Bite My Tongue.

On 3 November 2011, "Little Death" was made available for free download. Three days later, a music video for "Bite My Tongue", which was filmed in New York the previous month, was released. It was directed by Matthia; Franceschi thought of its concept, before showing it to the other members, eventually brainstorming the final version with Matthia. They filmed it in the US on the basis that they thought the filming process in general was better in the States than in the UK. The video stars Franceschi in a control room pulling switches to simulate the other members, who are connected to wires, performing in another room. Sykes is then seen in the control room with Franceschi, who is now connected by wires, joining his bandmates in the other room. "Bite my Tongue" was released as a single on 2 December 2011, with "Brother" and "Moonchild", both of which dated to the Hold Me Down era, as its B-sides.

To coincide with a US tour, Sinners Never Sleep was released in the US on 24 January 2012. According to Franceschi, by having the US release follow its original UK release, Virgin Records had more time to promote it. Franceschi later recounted that they "never met fucking anyone from the label, or received any support [for the album in the US] at all," bar one member of staff that would personally give them stock to sell while touring as the label "had not even thought make sure of that, which obviously made no sense whatsoever". On 5 March 2012, a music video for "No One Does It Better" was released. It opens with the band and their partners riding in a car as it pulls into an abandoned gas station. Franceschi is seen singing the track while the others are exploring the area. The song was released as a single on 6 April 2012 with an acoustic version as an additional track. A live video for "Reckless" composed of tour footage was released on 6 September 2012. The track was released as a single on 22 October 2012.

== Touring ==
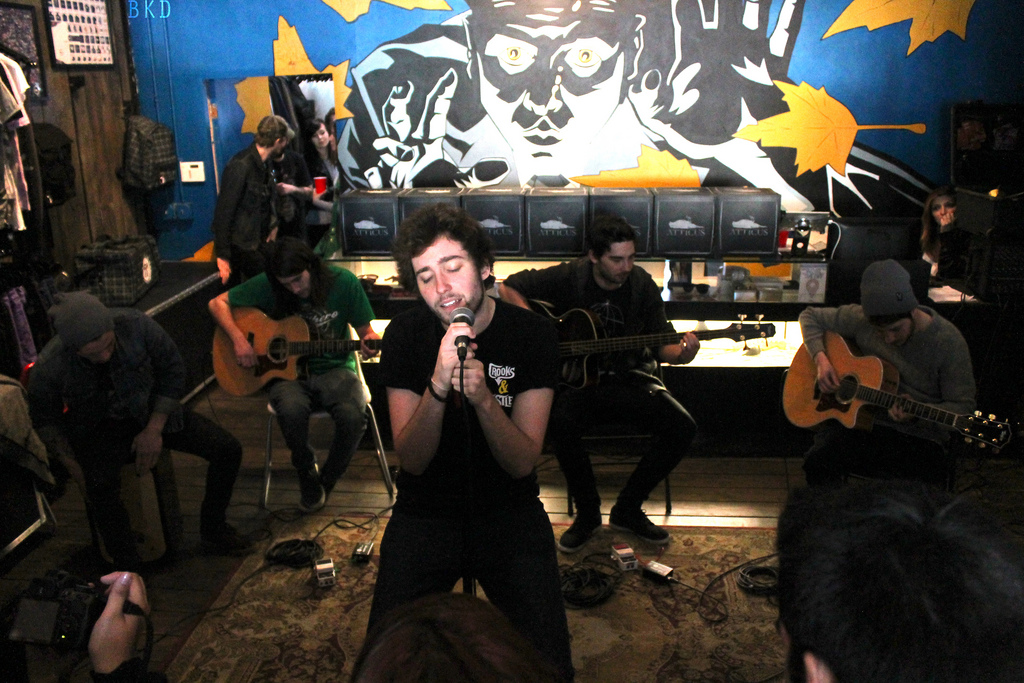
You Me at Six playing an acoustic in-store

In July and August 2011, You Me at Six performed at the Belsonic, Sonisphere, Reading and Leeds, T in the Park, and V Festivals in the UK, and the Live Music Festival in Kraków, Poland, followed by a co-headlining Australian tour with We the Kings, with support from the Mission in Motion. To promote Sinners Never Sleep's release, the band did a series of in-store performances and signing events, and went on a UK tour, with support from Deaf Havana and Lower Than Atlantis. You Me at Six then supported Mayday Parade on their headlining US tour, titled Noise Tour, later in the month. Towards the end of the year, the band played two one-off shows in the UK, one as part of a Q 25th anniversary event and the other for the 40th anniversary of Hard Rock Cafe. The band went on a co-headlining US tour with the Swellers, and were supported by We Are the Ocean and Twin Atlantic, in January and February 2012. The tour was initially planned to be co-headlined with the Dangerous Summer. For the trek, You Me at Six used a tour bus as they found it cheaper than using a van and staying in hotels.

Following this, You Me at Six went on a tour of Indonesia. Around their performances at Soundwave festival in Australia in February and March 2012, You Me at Six played two sideshows with A Day to Remember and the Used. You Me at Six embarked on a headlining UK tour in March and April 2012; the Ireland dates were pushed back as Franceschi suffered from tonsillitis. Mayday Parade and the Skints supported for these rescheduled dates, while Kids in Glass Houses supported the rest of the UK shows. In June 2012, the band performed at the Download Festival in the UK, and joined the Warped Tour in the US until late July 2012. The following month, the band performed at Reading Festival in the UK, and in October 2012, they performed for BBC Radio 1's "Radio One Rocks" event. On 8 December 2012, the band played a one-off show called "The Final Night of Sin" at Wembley Arena, London. The band worked with Abbey Road Studios-affiliated Live Here Now company to record and film the show. They were supported by We Are the Ocean and Deaf Havana. The show was subsequently released as a CD/DVD combo on 25 March 2013.

== Reception ==
Professional ratings
Aggregate scores
Source	Rating
AnyDecentMusic?	5.7/10
Metacritic	68/100
Review scores
Source	Rating
AllMusic	3/5 stars
Big Cheese	4/5
The Boston Phoenix	3/4 stars
Dead Press!	8/10
DIY	7/10
Gigwise	8/10 stars
Punknews.org	3/5 stars

Sinners Never Sleep was met with generally favourable reviews from music critics. At Metacritic, the album received an average score of 68, based on seven reviews. AnyDecentMusic? gave it an average score of 5.6, based on eight reviews. The majority of the responses centred about the album's stylistic change.

The Aquarian Weekly writer Marissa Savino praised the record for being "both catchy and meaningful" with its "twelve relatable tracks, each set to an infectious beat". In a review for Hot Press, Edwin McFee called it the band's best effort that "benefit[s] hugely by adding a little spice to the sugar", referring to the inclusion of Sykes and McCall. Gigwise's Will Lavin commended the band for "stay[ing] consistent through thick and thin", and releasing "both head nodding bangers and thought provoking gems". Dead Press! founder Zach Redrup said the new album was what Hold Me Down "was meant and aspired to be", and lauded the band for "finally" maturing. Redrup also said the release "sounds more determined [...] and they've wandered into places darker than they would've dared tread into before". Gareth O'Malley of DIY said the "more stripped-back" tracks would split opinions but that this form of progression "should be welcomed". The record "has proved that they have enough talent to take even more risks". The Boston Phoenix's Michael Christopher called it a "transitional album, though such efforts rarely bode as well for the future as this does".

Big Cheese reviewer Rob Mair said the band stuck to the "tried and tested" but "succeed in pushing the boundaries at the edges" rather than completely revamping their sound. Punknews.org staff member Sloane Daley called it "a pretty damn good pop rock record" but said it lacks decent lyrics. He applauded the band for "creating such a listenable album so soon after dropping the lead balloon that Hold Me Down was". BBC Music's Alistair Lawrence said the release tries to focus on both the future and the past simultaneously, making it "destined to sound a bit like a (frequently awkward) transition". Despite this, for an album that might have strayed into one particular way, "it manages the neat trick of going in both". AllMusic reviewer Jon O'Brien found the release "much more convincing when it plays to its melodic strengths" rather than "pandering to the Kerrang! masses", and said if the band chose to focus on the record's "more mature mainstream moments" it like would have "turned out to be a more consistent affair".

=== Commercial performance and accolades ===
Sinners Never Sleep reached number one on the UK midweek album chart; it ended up at number three after selling 27,000 copies in the first week of release. It reached number 28 in Australia and number 39 in Ireland. The album was certified silver in the UK by the British Phonographic Industry (BPI) in December 2011, and gold in August 2012. By January 2017, it had sold over 160,000 copies in the UK. "Loverboy" and "No One Does It Better" charted at number 39 and 92, respectively, on the UK Singles Chart. "Bite My Tongue" was certified silver by the BPI in March 2024.

"Bite My Tongue" and "No One Does It Better" were nominated for Best Single (losing to "Rebel Love Song" by Black Veil Brides), and Sinners Never Sleep for Best Album (losing to Set the World on Fire by Black Veil Brides), at the Kerrang! Awards. In 2021, Franceschi ranked Sinners Never Sleep as his favourite You Me at Six album, stating that "primarily as the spirit of that record has lived on in every record we’ve made since". That same year, Kerrang! ranked the album at number 19 on a retrospective list of the 50 best releases from 2011.

== Track listing ==
All music by You Me at Six, all lyrics by Josh Franceschi. All recordings produced by Garth Richardson.

Sinners Never Sleep standard track listing
No.	Title	Length
1.	"Loverboy"	3:16
2.	"Jaws on the Floor"	2:44
3.	"Bite My Tongue" (featuring Oliver Sykes)	3:41
4.	"This Is the First Thing"	3:12
5.	"No One Does It Better"	4:40
6.	"Little Death"	3:10
7.	"Crash"	5:09
8.	"Reckless"	4:29
9.	"Time Is Money" (featuring Winston McCall)	2:54
10.	"Little Bit of Truth"	5:30
11.	"The Dilemma"	2:50
12.	"When We Were Younger"	6:11

iTunes bonus tracks
No.	Title	Length
13.	"Takes One to Know One"	4:33
14.	"Loverboy" (music video)	3:20
15.	"Bite My Tongue" (video; documentary)	42:24

== Personnel ==
Personnel per booklet.

You Me at Six

- Josh Franceschi – vocals
- Chris Miller – lead guitar
- Max Helyer – rhythm guitar
- Matt Barnes – bass guitar
- Dan Flint – drums

Additional musicians

- Oli Sykes – guest vocals (track 3)
- Winston McCall – guest vocals (track 9)
- Ben Kaplan – keys, programming
- Damian Taylor – programming (track 12)
- Jeremy Rubolino – strings and brass conductor, arranger

Production

- Garth Richardson – produced, Pro Tools editor, additional engineer
- John Mitchell – mixing
- Matt O'Grady – mixing, additional engineer
- Ben Kaplan – recording, Pro Tools editor
- Nick Rowe – Pro Tools editor, additional engineer
- Geoff Neale – assistant engineer
- Clint Welander – assistant engineer, additional engineer
- Christian Wright – mastering
- Jorge Velasco – recording
- Jeff Ellis – assistant engineer

Design

- Otis Bell – cover photography, mugshots
- Giles Revell – photofit photography
- Steve Gullick – band photography
- Alex Cowper – art direction, design
- Matt Davey – art direction, commissioning

== Charts ==
=== Weekly charts ===
Chart performance for Sinners Never Sleep
Chart (2011)	Peak position
Australian Albums (ARIA)	28
Irish Albums (IRMA)	39
UK Albums (Official Charts)	3
UK Rock & Metal Albums (Official Charts)	1

=== Year-end charts ===
Year-end chart performance for Sinners Never Sleep
Chart (2011)	Position
UK Albums (OCC)	198
Chart (2012)	Position
UK Albums (OCC)	192

== Certifications ==
Certifications for Sinners Never Sleep
Region	Certification	Certified units/sales
United Kingdom (BPI)	Gold	100,000^{^}
^{^} Shipments figures based on certification alone.

== See also ==
- Lights and Sounds – the 2006 album by Yellowcard, which saw that band also move away from pop punk to alternative rock
