= Rescue Me (You Me at Six song) =

Single by You Me at Six featuring Chiddy

from the album Breakfast
- Released: 13 February 2011
- Recorded: 2010
- Length: 3:17
- Label: Virgin
- Songwriter(s): Eshraque "iSHi" Mughal, Philippe-Marc Anquetil, Chidera "Chiddy" Anamege
- Producer(s): iSHi

You Me at Six singles chronology
"Stay With Me" (2010)	"Rescue Me" (2011)	"Loverboy" (2011)

Chiddy singles chronology
"Truth" (2010)	"Rescue Me" (2011)	"Mind Your Manners" (2012)

"Rescue Me" is a song by British rock band You Me at Six. The song features vocals from Chiddy, one half of the American hip-hop duo Chiddy Bang and was released in the United Kingdom on 13 February 2011; where it debuted at number 21 on the UK Singles Chart and number 50 on the Irish Singles Chart.

Chiddy Bang re-released the song on their 2012 album Breakfast as Chiddy Bang featuring You Me at Six.

== Song creation ==
In an interview with the music magazine Rock Sound in September 2011 Josh Franceschi said that "Rescue Me" was a low point for the band. "We were basically forced to release a song that we didn't want to", he said. According to Franceschi, the band wanted to end the promotional campaign for Hold Me Down with "Fireworks", a ballad which is the last track of the album, but the label wanted a big radio song. "We got drunk during some time off last year and wrote a song that was like "Airplanes" as a joke", the singer recalled. "We sent the track in and two weeks later we got a call from our label saying it was the best You Me At Six song we'd ever written... Soon enough, we get another call – they're shooting a video for the song". Franceschi said he felt like the band had sold out: "I honestly could not believe I was part of something like that... we've worked too hard getting to where we are to throw it all away because someone who sits in an office thinks he knows more about our fans and our band than we do."

== Music video ==
The music video for the single was made available for streaming on the band's official YouTube page on January 20, 2011. The video shows an American black boxer in preparations alongside his coach and mate for the fight scheduled later, the video ends at the start of the fight when the bell has been rung. The entire video however, features neither the band nor Chiddy in it.

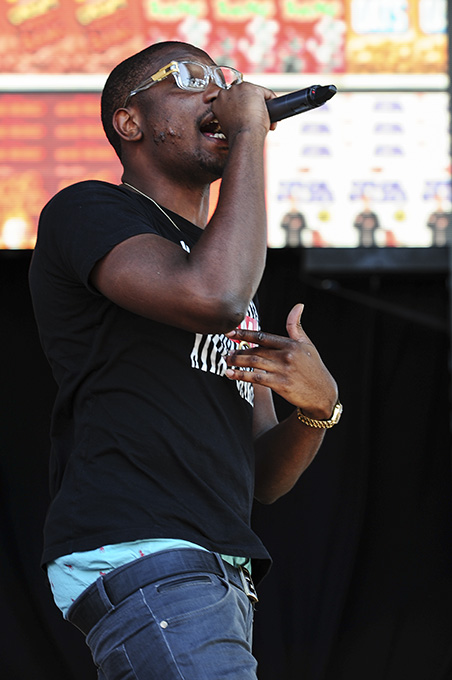
Chiddy Bang features in the video clip

== Track listing ==
Digital download

No.	Title	Length
1.	"Rescue Me"	3:17
2.	"Knew It Was You"	3:24
3.	"Rescue Me" (Instrumental)	3:17

== Chart performance ==
"Rescue Me" first charted on 18 February 2011, where it debuted at number 50 on the Irish Singles Chart; marking the band's first hit in the country. On 20 February, "Rescue Me" made its debut on the UK Singles Chart at number 21, with sales of 18,589 copies. The chart appearance also marked Chiddy Bang's second top 40 hit, after "Opposite of Adults" peaked at number 12 in May 2010.

== Charts ==
Chart (2011)	Peak position
Ireland (IRMA)	50
UK Singles (OCC)	21

== Release history ==
Region	Date	Format
United Kingdom	13 February 2011	Digital download

== Use in the media ==
- An instrumental version of the song was used on the Nine Network's rugby league analysis show 100% Footy.
