= Kerrang! Awards 2010 =

British music awards ceremony

- Sponsored by: Kerrang!
- Date: 29 July 2010
- Location: The Brewery, London
- Country: England
- Hosted by: Scott Ian; Corey Taylor

The Kerrang! Awards 2010 were held in London, England, on 29 July 2010, at The Brewery in Romford and were hosted by Slipknot singer Corey Taylor and Anthrax guitarist Scott Ian.

On 23 June 2010, Kerrang! announced the 2010 nominees. The main categories were dominated by Thirty Seconds to Mars and Paramore with four nominations, followed by You Me at Six and Bullet for My Valentine with three apiece. Bullet for My Valentine was the biggest winner of the night, taking home two awards.

== Nominations ==
Winners are in bold text.

=== Best British Newcomer ===
- Deaf Havana
- General Fiasco
- Out of Sight
- **Rise to Remain**
- Throats

=== Best International Newcomer ===
- Dommin
- Framing Hanley
- Halestorm
- The Swellers
- **Trash Talk**

=== Best British Band ===
- **Bullet for My Valentine**
- Enter Shikari
- The King Blues
- Lostprophets
- You Me at Six

=== Best International Band ===
- **Thirty Seconds to Mars**
- Avenged Sevenfold
- Green Day
- Metallica
- Paramore

=== Best Live Band ===
- Thirty Seconds to Mars
- **Bullet for My Valentine**
- Green Day
- Paramore
- Skindred

=== Best Album ===
- Thirty Seconds to Mars — This Is War
- Biffy Clyro — Only Revolutions
- Bullet for My Valentine — Fever
- **Paramore — Brand New Eyes**
- You Me at Six — Hold Me Down

=== Best Single ===
- Avenged Sevenfold — "Nightmare"
- The Blackout — "Save Ourselves (The Warning)"
- Four Year Strong — "Wasting Time (Eternal Summer)"
- Slipknot — "Snuff"
- **You Me at Six — "Liquid Confidence"**

=== Best Video ===
- Thirty Seconds to Mars — "Kings and Queens"
- **Biffy Clyro — "The Captain"**
- Cancer Bats — "Sabotage"
- Lostprophets — "It's Not the End of the World, But I Can See It from Here"
- Paramore — "Brick by Boring Brick"

=== Classic Songwriter ===
- **Lostprophets**

=== No Half Measures ===
- **Frank Turner**

=== Kerrang! Inspiration ===
- **Rammstein**

=== Kerrang! Services to Metal ===
- **Paul Gray**

=== Kerrang! Icon ===
- **Ronnie James Dio**

=== Kerrang! Hall of Fame ===
- **Mötley Crüe**
