= Stay with Me (You Me at Six song) =

Single by You Me at Six

from the album Hold Me Down
- Released: 5 September 2010
- Genre: Alternative rock, pop punk
- Length: 3:12 (album/single version); 3:00 (UK commercial radio edit)
- Label: Virgin
- Songwriter(s): Josh Franceschi
- Producer(s): Matt O'Grady, John Mitchell

You Me at Six singles chronology
"Liquid Confidence (Nothing to Lose)" (2010)	"Stay with Me" (2010)	"Rescue Me" (2011)

"Stay with Me" is the fourth single by the British rock band You Me at Six, taken from their second studio album, Hold Me Down. The single was released as a digital download on 5 September 2010, with the CD single released the following day on 6 September. The very beginning of the song is edited in a radio version of the song.

== Music video ==
The video is directed by Frank Borin, and shows the band playing in a forest in Chatsworth, California.

== Track listing ==
Digital download

No.	Title	Length
1.	"Stay With Me"	3:18
2.	"Stay With Me" (Acoustic Version)	3:18
3.	"Starry Eyed" (Ellie Goulding cover)	2:29

== Chart performance ==
"Stay With Me" entered the UK Rock Chart on 1 August 2010 at number 37, where it remained for two consecutive weeks. In its third week on the chart, the single rose to number 3 before climbing to number 2 on 22 August 2010. On its fifth week on the chart the single climbed to number 12 and to number 7 on 5 September 2010. On its official release, the single climbed five places to a peak of number 2, behind Linkin Park's "The Catalyst".

The single entered the UK Singles Chart on 5 September 2010 at number 175 before climbing to number 52 upon release the following week. This is the band's fourth most successful single and its sixth Top 100 hit; the third single from Hold Me Down.

=== Charts ===
Chart (2010)	Peak position
UK Singles (OCC)	52
UK Rock (OCC)	2

== Certifications ==
Region	Certification	Certified units/sales
United Kingdom (BPI)	Silver	200,000^{‡}
^{‡} Sales+streaming figures based on certification alone.
