= No One Does It Better (song) =

Single by You Me at Six

from the album Sinners Never Sleep
- Released: 8 April 2012
- Recorded: 2011; Los Angeles, California, U.S.
- Genre: Pop rock, alternative rock, pop punk
- Length: 4:41
- Label: Virgin, Polydor
- Songwriters: Matt Barnes, Dan Flint, Josh Franceschi, Max Helyer, Chris Miller
- Producer: Gggarth

You Me at Six singles chronology
"The Swarm" (2012)	"No One Does It Better" (2012)	"Reckless" (2012)

"No One Does It Better" is the third single from You Me at Six's third studio album Sinners Never Sleep. The single was released on 8 April 2012 as a digital download in the United Kingdom. The single reached No. 92 on the UK Singles Chart, making it the band's ninth top 100 single. Its comparably low chart position could be attributed to another much higher charting single, The Swarm (No. 23), being released during the weeks leading up to the single's release, overshadowing the release of "No One Does It Better".

== Music video ==
A music video to accompany the release of "No One Does It Better" was first released onto YouTube on 5 March 2012 at a total length of four minutes and eighteen seconds.

== Track listing ==
Digital download
No.	Title	Length
1.	"No One Does It Better"	4:41
2.	"No One Does It Better" (Acoustic version)	4:44
3.	"No One Does It Better" (Radio Edit)	4:18

== Chart performance ==
Chart (2012)	Peak position
UK Singles (The Official Charts Company)	92
UK Official Streaming Chart Top 100	84

== Release history ==
Region	Date	Format	Label
United Kingdom	8 April 2012	Digital Download	Virgin Records
