= Loverboy (You Me at Six song) =

Single by You Me at Six

from the album Sinners Never Sleep
- Released: 23 September 2011
- Recorded: 2011; Los Angeles, California, U.S.
- Genre: Alternative rock, hard rock
- Length: 3:17
- Label: Virgin
- Songwriter(s): Josh Franceschi

You Me at Six singles chronology
"Rescue Me" (2011)	"Loverboy" (2011)	"Bite My Tongue" (2011)

"Loverboy" is the first single by British rock band You Me at Six, taken from their third studio album, Sinners Never Sleep. The single was released on 23 September 2011 as a digital download in the United Kingdom. The single reached #39 on the UK Singles Chart, making it the band's third Top-40 UK single.

== Music video ==
A music video to accompany the release of "Loverboy" was first released onto YouTube on 29 August 2011, at a total length of three minutes and twenty-three. The clip, which was shot over 15 hours, sees the Surrey-based rock group under interrogation after being arrested "for being a band". Josh Franceschi said: "The whole concept of our album is being under arrest... whether it be body arrest or not being able to say what you want to say, when you want to say it. Throughout the video we're getting interrogated by these two guys... basically we've been arrested for being a band."

== Track listing ==
Digital download
No.	Title	Length
1.	"Loverboy"	3:17
2.	"Loverboy" (Acoustic Version)	3:06
3.	"Moon Child"	2:43
4.	"Loverboy" (Instrumental)	3:12

== Chart performance ==
Chart (2011)	Peak Position
Scotland (OCC)	31
UK Singles (OCC)	39

== Release history ==
Region	Date	Format	Label
United Kingdom	23 September 2011	Digital Download	Virgin Records
