= Hold Me Down =

Studio album by You Me at Six
- Released: 11 January 2010
- Recorded: April–May 2009, July 2009
- Studios: Outhouse, Reading, Berkshire
- Genres: Alternative rock; pop rock; pop punk
- Length: 40:37
- Label: Virgin
- Producers: John Mitchell, Matt O'Grady

You Me at Six chronology
Take Off Your Colours (2008)	Hold Me Down (2010)	Sinners Never Sleep (2011)

Singles from Hold Me Down
- 1. "Underdog" Released: 5 February 2010; 2. "Liquid Confidence" Released: 16 April 2010; 3. "Stay with Me" Released: 3 September 2010

Hold Me Down is the second studio album by English rock band You Me at Six, released on 11 January 2010 through Virgin Records as the follow-up to 2008's Take Off Your Colours. It is the band's first release on the major label Virgin Records. Like their debut album, the album was once again Centropy produced and engineered by John Mitchell and Matt O'Grady. "The Consequence" was made available for free digital download before the first single, "Underdog" preceded the album's release. Despite receiving mixed reviews, Hold Me Down was a commercial success and debuted at No. 5 on the UK Albums Chart and is certified Gold in the UK for 100,000 shipments of copies.

== Background and production ==
You Me at Six's debut album Take Off Your Colours was released in October 2008, produced by Matt O'Grady and John Mitchell. To promote the album, the band sold out the Astoria and the Roundhouse, both in London. They later supported Fall Out Boy and Paramore separately on their Europe tours. Sometime after this, frontman Josh Franceschi broke up with his long-term girlfriend, which to him was the "biggest thing in the world". Writing for their next album dated back to the month of their debut album's release in late 2008. In April and May 2009, the band recorded the majority of their next album, with additional sessions in July 2009; a UK tour took place in between. In contrast to a few of their peers going to the US to record, the band preferred to record in the UK as it would allow them more studio time to work on getting different production sounds. Sessions were held at Outhouse Studios, located in Reading, Berkshire, Mitchell and O'Grady returning to produce.

Band members stayed in flats located in the town centre close to the studio. They were nearly evicted from the accommodation on multiple occasions due to partying and skateboarding in the premises. O'Grady also acted as engineer, while Mitchell mixed the recordings. Bob Ludwig mastered the album at Gateway Mastering. The band intentionally picked Ludwig as they wanted it to have a bigger sound than their debut. Author Neil Daniels, in his book You Me at Six – Never Hold an Underdog Down (2015) said getting Ludwig meant the band was informing their fanbase that they were "outgrowing their youthful pop-punk roots and maturing". Franceschi stated that the process took around 6–7 weeks, as opposed to the 2 weeks for Take Off Your Colours. The album also features guest vocals from Aled Phillips of Kids in Glass Houses on "There's No Such Thing as Accidental Infidelity" and Sean Smith of The Blackout on "The Consequence". Prior to release the band stated they were very happy that the album "reflects our growth as people and musicians".

== Composition and lyrics ==
Musically, the album has been described as pop punk and pop rock. Daniels noted influences from older 1990s and 2000s acts Incubus, Jimmy Eat World and the Starting Line, in contrast to the peer-influenced direction of their debut album. According to Franceschi, the band evolved their sound, building upon all of the "things we thought were good from Take Off Your Colours". They spent more time writing material, which Franceschi said was "really important, the album like forming the way it did. I think it’s definitely a step in the right direction for our band". Franceschi's lyrical influences during this time consisted of Envy on the Coast, Mayday Parade and rediscovery of Jimmy Eat World. He had ceased listening to some bands, such as the Bled and Senses Fail, in favour of Foo Fighters. Franceschi's lyrics were more introspective than previously, as the result of him and his girlfriend breaking up. He intentionally avoided addressing her directly, preferring to chronicle how the past year informed his life. The pair later reunited, with her saying "to me a couple of times 'Did you have to write that [line]?', but I think she understood". He mentioned that one major topic of the album is about feeling lost, which he experienced during the album's writing process, in addition to pondering the future of further touring.

"The Consequence" is a darker-edged track that opens the album with sound of sirens; the guitar riff in it recalls the one in "Everyday Combat" by Lostprophets. Franceschi's vocal on it has been compared to Silverchair frontman Daniel Johns. "Underdog" with its focus on drums and guitars earned a comparison to "Disloyal Order of Water Buffaloes" (2008) by Fall Out Boy. "Playing the Blame Game" evokes the sound of Paramore and Panic! at the Disco. Portions of "Stay with Me" were reminiscent of the work of the Used. "Safer to Hate Her" is an emo song that is followed by "Take Your Breath Away", which Daniels saw as a "speedy rocker with a lot of anger and frustration" from Franceschi. "Liquid Confidence", like "Underdog" before it, talks about the music industry. "Hard to Swallow" continued the pop punk sound of their debut album. "There's No Such Thing as Accidental Infidelity" is a mid-tempo ballad, which incorporates the band's American influences. The album concludes with the pop punk song "Trophy Eyes" and the pop rock track "Fireworks". Daniels said it displays a "definite progression from Take Off Your Colours with a strong vocal performance, more crafted guitars and decidedly pronounced choruses. A major step forward".

== Release and promotion ==
Between September and November 2009, You Me at Six performed on the AP Fall Ball Tour in the US, with the Academy Is..., Mayday Parade, Set Your Goals and the Secret Handshake. On 11 November 2009, Hold Me Down was announced for release in January 2010. In addition, the album's track listing was revealed. On 25 November, "The Consequence" was released as a free download. In December 2009, the group supported Paramore on their headlining UK tour. "Underdog" premiered on Nick Grimshaw's BBC Radio 1 show on 17 December 2009. The following day, a music video was released for "The Consequence". Over the Christmas period, the members took a break in order to de-stress from one another. "Underdog" was posted on the band's Myspace page on 27 December, as was an acoustic rendition of it. A music video, filmed at Brixton Academy in London in December 2009, was released for the track on 4 January 2010. The video stars a ballerina whose ex-boyfriend cheats on her; she dances for the woman he is cheating with. It concludes with the ballerina walking away from her ex, who stands alone as the woman he was with had also left him.

Hold Me Down was released on 11 January 2010 through Virgin Records. A in-store performance at Banquet Records in London, planned to coincide with the album's release, was moved to the nearby Hippodrome due to the hype surrounding the band. A series of in-store events would follow in February 2010. "Underdog" was released as a single, with "Fact-Tastic" and the acoustic version of "Underdog" as additional tracks, on 5 February 2010. In February and March, the band performed at the Soundwave festival in Australia, and then embarked on a headlining UK tour, with support from Forever the Sickest Kids and We the Kings. Despite suffering from laryngitis, and going against doctor's advice, Franceschi embarked on the trek. On 16 March 2010, the album was released in the US. A music video was released for "Liquid Confidence" on 19 March. It sees the band trying to film and met with a myriad of technical issues. The track was released as an EP, with live versions of "The Consequence" and "Kiss and Tell" recorded at Wembley Arena as additional tracks, on 16 April. In May 2010, they did further in-store events, and performed at BBC Radio 1's Big Weekend to close out the month.

The group supported Bring Me the Horizon for two shows in the US, before embarking on the Warped Tour between late June and early August. A music video was released for "Stay with Me" on 21 July 2010, filmed in a forest in Chatsworth, California. In August the band performed on the main stage at the Reading and Leeds Festivals. "Stay with Me" was released as a single, with a cover of Ellie Goulding's "Starry Eyed" and an acoustic version of "Stay with Me" as additional tracks, on 3 September. The band then went on tours of New Zealand, Australia and Japan. After a Halloween show they went on another UK headlining tour to close out the year in December 2010, with support from the Blackout, Set Your Goals and Canterbury. Due to weather issues, two shows were rescheduled for January 2011. The group then added two extra shows around these rescheduled dates. The band wanted "Fireworks" to be the last single from the album, as they felt a ballad would be a good way to close out the promotional cycle. However, at the insistence of Virgin Records, who wanted a heavy-sounding rock track, they issued the non-album song "Rescue Me" (2011) instead, which was a collaboration with Chiddy Bang. "Knew It Was You", an outtake from Hold Me Down, and an instrumental rendition of "Rescue Me" were included as its B-sides.

In 2021, Franceschi ranked Hold Me Down as his fourth favourite You Me at Six album, stating that it felt as if it was "our first ‘real’ recording of an album. By that I mean we had a longer time to put the record together". That same year the band played a series of celebratory 10th anniversary shows where they performed the album in its entirety.

== Reception ==
Professional ratings
Aggregate scores
Source	Rating
AnyDecentMusic?	4.6/10
Review scores
Source	Rating
AllMusic	3/5 stars
BBC Music	Mixed
The Independent	Unfavorable
In the News	8/10
Kerrang!	KKKK
Metro	3/5 stars
The Observer	Unfavorable
Rock Sound	8/10
The Skinny	2/5 stars
Sputnikmusic	3/5

Hold Me Down received mixed reviews from music critics upon its release. AnyDecentMusic? gave it an average score of 4.6, based on eight reviews. Daniels said even the favourable reviews "still had some stinging criticisms". Few reviewers considered it to be "too clean-cut in its production and execution ... lack[ing] the kind of rawness that punk rock strived for". Additional remarks were levied at the band for coming across as too American, while the other critics noted an evolution since their last release and complimented Franceschi's voice for maturity despite its whiny tonality.

Tim Newbound reviewed the album in Rock Sound, making comparisons with New Found Glory's self-titled album; "the album boasts a glorious sense of youthful exuberance, arguably only bettered by their US peers New Found Glory's 2000 self-titled effort... These boys are far from copycats though. There are way too many melodic rock/pop-punk bands in the world who are happy to ride on the coattails of others; throughout Hold Me Down, You Me at Six have instead pushed themselves to create a record that will delight existing fans and should rightfully attract many more". Kerrang! magazine was ok also favourable. David McLaughlin stated that "this time around You Me at Six have spiked the mix and created a cocktail so sweetly addictive that the faithful might just have to get used to sharing this band with many more". He also complimented the band's progression by adding, "It's not so much that the songs themselves that impress, but rather how much it shows this band are growing".

Joe Barton of The Skinny was less favourable however. He lamented, "any of the dozen tracks of Hold Me Down, despite being flawlessly executed, could just as easily have been knocked out by teen-adored Hoobastank or Taking Back Sunday. That being said, this kind of music has a rabid audience. If they’d only been a few years older, though, they would have the Arctic Monkeys to idolise... you can’t help feeling these kids have been short-changed". More unfavorable reviews also followed from British newspapers; Simon Price of The Independent bemoaned, "From the action-packed band name to the obligatory long song titles, from the witless blare of the vocals to the compressed blandness of the guitar sound, this is bog-standard emo ordinaire". Kitty Empire of The Observer criticized the album's lack of originality; "Polished, punchy Hold Me Down is their second album, replete with bouncy dramas about loyalty, betrayal and other perils of young love. Its sole insight is contained in the song title 'There's No Such Thing As Accidental Infidelity'; not even the most fine-meshed musical sieve could unearth any originality here".

BBC critic Raziq Rauf gave a mixed review, but was ultimately disappointed with Hold Me Down. He summarised his article by stating the album was, "simply a carefully polished and highly competent, nearly retrospective collection of pop-rock songs from a band that, even at a young age, has nothing to say that hasn't been said by others before them (and, unarguably, said better). As 'Fireworks' closes the album, Franceschi moans about a girl who blew her chance; you can’t help but think You Me At Six, in such a privileged position, have done the same". Davey Boy of Sputnikmusic was more favorable. Despite criticizing an "Americanised" sound, the review offered praise to the band's progression; "Josh Franceschi’s vocals have clearly improved from the occasionally whiny attributes of his past, while the music on show has a much fuller sound. Thankfully, the better songs still have a multitude of hooks to keep you singing along and there is nothing downright awful included. It is just hoped that next time around, these strengths can be coupled with greater imagination and ambition". Arwa Haider of Metro stated that while the band have "stuck to a formula", she praised the "assured performances". She wrote, "Admittedly, their angry outbursts (Safer To Hate Her) and cod-American drawling stick to a well-worn formula but it’s one spiced up with ample punch, pop and prettiness".

Ben Brady, journalist for In the News complimented the album's direction; "Debut offering Take Off Your Colours was a good album, with pieces of great, however tracks swayed between pop punk and rock and to listen to the LP in full it didn't always have a clear direction. With their second full studio effort, that direction has been discovered as the heavier elements start to show through, while maintaining the catchy crowd pleasing sing alongs; as an example, the slightly predictable nature of first single 'Underdog' demonstrates there is something here for everyone". Niki Boyle of The List was also more favourable, stating: "Chances are, if you liked YMA6’s first effort Take Off Your Colours, you’ll find plenty to like here. Spiky pop-punk riffs, catchy choruses and guest vocalists from The Blackout and Kids in Glass Houses ensure there’s nothing to disappoint the fans".

After selling over 10,000 copies, the album reached number four in the midweek chart, before eventually charting at number five in the UK chart. It was certified silver by the British Phonographic Industry (BPI) in March 2010 and gold in March 2012. It had sold over 60,000 copies by May 2011. "Stay with Me" was certified silver by the BPI in September 2023. "Liquid Confidence" and Hold Me Down were nominated at the 2010 Kerrang! Awards for Best Single and Best Album respectively. Out of the two, "Liquid Confidence" won Best Single.

== Track listing ==
All music by You Me at Six, all lyrics by Josh Franceschi.

No.	Title	Length
1.	"The Consequence" (featuring Sean Smith)	4:26
2.	"Underdog"	2:22
3.	"Playing the Blame Game"	3:05
4.	"Stay with Me"	3:14
5.	"Safer to Hate Her"	3:17
6.	"Take Your Breath Away"	3:02
7.	"Liquid Confidence"	3:11
8.	"Hard to Swallow"	3:24
9.	"Contagious Chemistry"	3:29
10.	"There's No Such Thing as Accidental Infidelity" (featuring Aled Phillips)	3:46
11.	"Trophy Eyes"	2:50
12.	"Fireworks"	4:19
Total length:		40:37

iTunes bonus track
No.	Title	Length
13.	"My Head's a Prison and Nobody Visits"	3:19

== Personnel ==
Personnel per booklet.

You Me at Six

- Josh Franceschi – vocals
- Chris Miller – lead guitar
- Max Helyer – rhythm guitar
- Matt Barnes – bass guitar
- Dan Flint – drums

Additional musicians

- Sean Smith – guest vocals (track 1)
- Aled Phillips – guest vocals (track 10)

Production

- John Mitchell – producer, mixing
- Matty O'Grady – producer, engineer
- Bob Ludwig – mastering
- Simon Helm – angel painting

== Charts ==
=== Weekly charts ===
Chart (2010)	Peak position
Irish Albums (IRMA)	24
Scottish Albums (OCC)	5
UK Albums (OCC)	5
UK Digital Albums (OCC)	3

=== Year-end charts ===
Chart (2010)	Position
UK Albums (OCC)	187

== Certifications ==
Region	Certification	Certified units/sales
United Kingdom (BPI)	Gold	100,000^{^}
^{^} Shipments figures based on certification alone.
