= Liquid Confidence (Nothing to Lose) =

Single by You Me at Six

from the album Hold Me Down
- Released: 18 April 2010 (digital); 19 April 2010 (physical)
- Recorded: 2009
- Genre: Alternative rock
- Length: 3:12
- Label: Virgin
- Songwriter(s): Josh Franceschi
- Producer(s): Matt O'Grady; John Mitchell

You Me at Six singles chronology
"Underdog" (2010)	"Liquid Confidence" (2010)	"Stay With Me" (2010)

"Liquid Confidence" is the third single by British rock band You Me at Six, taken from their second studio album, Hold Me Down. The single was added to BBC Radio 1's A-list during April 2010. It entered the UK Singles Chart at number 86 upon release on 19 April 2010. On 29 July 2010, "Liquid Confidence" won Best Single at the Kerrang! Awards 2010.

== Music video ==
The video to the single was released by music magazine Kerrang! on 12 March 2010 on YouTube. You Me at Six also released the video to "Liquid Confidence" on 15 March 2010, and was made available to watch through the band's Myspace page.

The video features the band performing at a music video shoot. Despite the song playing throughout, the band are encountered with various problems throughout the video, each of which require a retake. At various points in the video, the camera is zoomed out to display the team behind making the music video. After various retakes, the band then perform to a black backdrop, with bright flashing lights. This scene flickers between itself and one of the band sitting and talking in their dressing room.

== Track listing ==
- Digital download

No.	Title	Length
1.	"Liquid Confidence (Nothing to Lose)"	3:12
2.	"The Consequence (live from Wembley Arena, London)"	2:50
3.	"Kiss and Tell (live from Wembley Arena, London)"	3:57

== Chart performance ==
"Liquid Confidence" debuted on the UK Singles Chart at number 196 on 11 April 2010. Upon physical release, the single climbed into the top 100 at number 86, under the released title of "Liquid Confidence (Nothing to Lose)". On 2 May 2010, the single fell 12 places to number 98, marking its second week within the top 100.

Chart (2010)	Peak position
UK Singles (OCC)	86
