= The Swelly Express =

Mixtape by Chiddy Bang
- Released: October 29, 2009
- Genre: Hip hop, electronica, afrobeat, indie
- Label: EMI

Chiddy Bang chronology
The Swelly Express (2009)	Air Swell (A Mini-Mixtape) (2010)

The Swelly Express is the debut mixtape by American band Chiddy Bang. Consisting of 18 tracks (12 songs, 5 skits, and 1 freestyle), the mixtape was released on October 29, 2009 to positive critical reception.

Professional ratings
Review scores
Source	Rating
RapReviews	(8/10)

== Track listing ==
1. "Get Up in the Morning"
2. "Never"
3. "Danger Zone"
4. "Fresh Like Us"
5. "Now U Know" (featuring Jordan Brown)
6. "Welcome to Major Label Inc" (skit)
7. "Truth" (featuring Passion Pit)
8. "Meet Mike Hoffman" (skit)
9. "Pro’s Freestyle 1.0"
10. "Awesome" (skit)
11. "Dream Chasin’"
12. "Silver Screen"
13. "Slow Down" (featuring Black Thought & ELDee the Don)
14. "Decline"
15. "Call" (skit)
16. "Opposite of Adults"
17. "Voicemail" (skit)
18. "All Things Go"
