= Truth (Chiddy Bang song) =

Single by Chiddy Bang

from the album The Swelly Express and the EP The Preview
- Released: 17 May 2010
- Genre: Rave-rap, pop
- Length: 2:55
- Label: EMI
- Producer(s): Xaphoon Jones

Chiddy Bang singles chronology
"Opposite of Adults" (2010)	"Truth" (2010)	"Mind Your Manners" (2011)

"Truth" is the second single released from American band Chiddy Bang. It was released in the United Kingdom on 17 May 2010 as a Digital Download and the CD Single was released the next day. The single samples Passion Pit's "Better Things" from the Chunk of Change EP that was released in 2008.

== Critical reception ==
Fraser McAlpine of BBC Chart Blog gave the song a positive review stating:

"Is anybody there?" shouts a worried Chiddy, while something slowish - namely Passion Pit's 'Better Things' - plays far too fast in the background, "I mean I hope somebody out there can hear this right here. Just listen..."

It's a curiously insecure way to start an upbeat pop song, donchathink? It's more the sort of thing you'd expect from a guerilla radio station, broadcasting from the middle of the end of the world, or a last transmission from an abandoned spaceship, set to music, because it's in a sci-fi musical. A hip hop sci-fi musical, no less.

And it raises an interesting philosophical question: if a rapper busts rhymes in the forest and there's no-one there to hear him, can he still boast?.

== Track listing ==
Digital Download

1. "Truth" – 2:55

== Chart performance ==
"Truth" debuted on the UK Singles Chart on 23 May 2010 at number 50, despite the success of previous single "Opposite of Adults", as well as entering the UK R&B Chart at number 18. The single's time in the singles chart was short lived as it dropped out of the Top 100 on its second week, and fell to number 33 on the R&B chart.

Chart (2010)	Peak Position
UK Singles (OCC)	50
UK Hip Hop/R&B (OCC)	18

== Release history ==
Region	Date	Format	Label
United Kingdom	17 May 2010	Digital download	EMI
United Kingdom	18 May 2010	CD single	Regal Recordings
