= The Preview (EP) =

EP by Chiddy Bang
- Released: October 1, 2010 (AUS) October 11, 2010 (UK) October 12, 2010 (US)
- Genres: Hip hop, indietronica
- Label: VRA

Chiddy Bang chronology
Air Swell (A Mini-Mixtape) (2010)	The Preview (2010)	Peanut Butter and Swelly (2011)

Singles from The Preview
- 1. "Opposite of Adults" Released: February 21, 2010; 2. "Truth" Released: May 17, 2010; 3. "The Good Life" Released: October 8, 2010

Professional ratings
Review scores
Source	Rating
Allmusic	3.5/5 stars
HipHopDX	3/5 stars
Lost in the Sound	(positive)
musicOMH	4/5 stars
RapReviews	(5.5/10)

The Preview is the second extended play by American hip hop duo Chiddy Bang. It was released in early October 2010 and did very well in sales, ranking at #2 in iTunes sales for the hip-hop/rap category. It also debuted at #76 on the Billboard 200 with 6,000 copies sold in the first week released.

Alongside positive sales figures, The Preview received generally positive reviews from both critics and fans alike, with some dubbing Chiddy Bang as "Philadelphia's Next Big Thing".

== Singles ==
- "Opposite of Adults" was released on 21 February 2010 as the lead single from the EP and samples "Kids" by MGMT. It became a top 10 hit in Australia, Ireland and New Zealand; and became a top 20 hit in Belgium and the UK, as well as a top 40 hit in Switzerland. It was also featured on EA Games Need for Speed Hot Pursuit
- "Truth" is the second single from the EP, released via digital download on 17 May 2010, and samples "Better Things" by Passion Pit. Truth only managed to chart in the United Kingdom, however missed out on the top 40, only managing to peak at 50. However it became a top 20 hit on the UK R&B Chart.
- "The Good Life" is the third single from the EP, released via digital download 8 October 2010. This song was featured in a Taco Bell commercial in 2011.
- "Old Ways" was featured on the soundtrack of the EA Sports Fight Night Champion video game in 2011 and samples "My Old Ways" by Dr. Dog.
- "Here We Go" was featured on the soundtrack for the 2K Sports video game NBA 2K12. It was also featured in The Sims 3: Late Night, recorded in Simlish.

== Track listing ==
1. "The Good Life" (co-produced and co-written by Pharrell) -- 2:56
2. "Truth"—2:53
3. "Opposite of Adults"—3:13
4. "Here We Go" (featuring Q-Tip) -- 3:21
5. "All Things Go"—3:09
6. "Nothing on We"—3:28
7. "Bad Day" (featuring Darwin Deez & Theodore Grams) -- 3:23
8. "Old Ways"—2:31
9. "Neighborhood" (featuring Killer Mike) (iTunes bonus track)

== Charts ==
Chart (2010)	Peak position
Australian Albums (ARIA Charts)	59
US Billboard 200	76
US Top R&B/Hip-Hop Albums	17
US Top Rap Albums	11
UK Albums Chart	168
UK R&B Chart	16

== Personnel ==
Main vocals

- Chidera "Chiddy" Anamege

Guest Vocals

- Q-Tip
- Killer Mike

Technicians and musicians

- Pharrell Williams - Producer & Writer
- Noah "Xaphoon Jones" Beresin - Producer
- Smith Carlson - Engineer
