= Ray Charles (song) =

2011 single by Chiddy Bang

Single by Chiddy Bang

from the album Breakfast
- Released: November 14, 2011
- Genre: Alternative hip hop; soul; R&B
- Length: 3:43
- Label: Virgin; " I.R.S.
- Songwriters: David Katz; Anthony Martini; Sam Hollander; Adam Palin; Chidera Anamege; Noah Beresin
- Producers: Xaphoon Jones; S*A*M and Sluggo

Chiddy Bang singles chronology
"Truth" (2010)	"Ray Charles" (2011)	"Heart Skips a Beat" (2012)

Audio sample
- "Ray Charles": file; help

"Ray Charles" is a song by American rap group Chiddy Bang. It was released in Canada on November 14, 2011, as a digital download as the second single from their debut studio album Breakfast. The song is an homage to the musician of the same name. Outside of the United States, "Ray Charles" was a hit in the British Isles, peaking within the top 20 of the charts in both Ireland and the United Kingdom. In the latter country, the song peaked at number 13 on the UK Singles Chart.

== Music video ==
A music video to accompany the release of "Ray Charles" was first released onto YouTube on January 5, 2012. It was directed by Alan Ferguson. The music video features the duo watching videos on VEVO, including one that features the duo dressed up like Ray Charles. Briefly, "Pass Out" and "So What Cha Want", by Tinie Tempah and the Beastie Boys, respectively, can be heard. The scene in the church towards the end of the video is an homage to The Blues Brothers. After one and week of being on the site the official video had been viewed just over 3.8 million times.

== Critical reception ==
Robert Copsey of Digital Spy gave the song a positive review stating:

It's easy to see how they've come to appreciate the late star as their soul homage not only fully embodies his sound, but also highlights how popular it remains today. Over a vintage piano riff and bouncy jazz section they rap a tribute to the legend that falls somewhere between profound and dangerously tongue-in-cheek ("You're too blind to see it"), but the result nonetheless sounds genuinely heartfelt.

== Track listing ==
Digital Download

1. "Ray Charles" – 3:43

== Charts ==
Chart (2011–2012)	Peak position
Australia (ARIA)	54
Belgium (Ultratip Bubbling Under Flanders)	47
Germany (GfK)	88
Ireland (IRMA)	20
Scotland Singles (Official Charts)	13
UK Singles (Official Charts)	13
UK Hip Hop/R&B (Official Charts)	4

== Release history ==
Region	Date	Format	Label
United States	November 14, 2011	Digital download	EMI
United States	January 24, 2012	Rhythmic radio	Capitol Records
United Kingdom	26 February 2012	Digital download	EMI
