= Mind Your Manners (Chiddy Bang song) =

Single by Chiddy Bang featuring Icona Pop

from the album Breakfast
- Released: July 19, 2011
- Genre: Pop-rap; indietronica
- Length: 3:16
- Label: Virgin; I.R.S.
- Songwriters: Chidera Anamege; Noah Beresin; Caroline Hjelt; Aino Jawo; Sam Hollander
- Producers: Xaphoon Jones; S*A*M and Sluggo

Chiddy Bang singles chronology
"Rescue Me" (2011)	"Mind Your Manners" (2011)	"Ray Charles" (2011)

Icona Pop singles chronology
"Manners" (2011)	"Mind Your Manners" (2011)	"I Love It" (2012)

"Mind Your Manners" is a song by American indie hip hop duo Chiddy Bang, featuring Swedish synth-pop duo Icona Pop. It was released in the United States on July 19, 2011 as a digital download as the lead single from their debut studio album Breakfast. The song takes a sample of "Manners" from the Icona Pop's self-titled debut album. The song did not enter the Billboard Hot 100 but peaked on the Bubbling Under Hot 100 Singles chart at number 15, as well as reaching number 19 on the Top Heatseekers. The official remix features Gym Class Heroes frontman and rapper Travie McCoy. The single is featured in the soundtrack for the EA Sports video game Madden NFL 12.

== Music video ==
On September 15, 2011, a music video of "Mind Your Manners" was uploaded on the duo's VEVO account on YouTube.

== Track listing ==
Digital Download

1. "Mind Your Manners" (feat. Icona Pop) – 3:16

Official Remix

1. "Mind Your Manners" (feat. Travie McCoy & Icona Pop) – 3:58

== Charts ==
=== Weekly charts ===
Chart (2012)	Peak position
Australia (ARIA)	11
Belgium (Ultratip Bubbling Under Flanders)	63
France (SNEP)	199
Ireland (IRMA)	33
New Zealand (Recorded Music NZ)	32

=== Year-end charts ===
Chart (2012)	Position
Australia (ARIA)	81

== Certifications ==
Region	Certification	Certified units/sales
Australia (ARIA)	2× Platinum	140,000^{^}
^{^} Shipments figures based on certification alone.

== Release history ==
Region	Date	Format	Label
Worldwide	19 July 2011	Digital download	EMI
United States	15 May 2012	Mainstream airplay	Capitol
