= Breakfast (Chiddy Bang album) =

Studio album by Chiddy Bang
- Released: February 21, 2012
- Recorded: 2011
- Genre: Hip-hop
- Length: 45:24
- Label: Virgin, I.R.S., Regal
- Producer: Xaphoon Jones, Yuri Beats, iSHi

Chiddy Bang chronology
Peanut Butter and Swelly (2011)	Breakfast (2012)

Singles from Breakfast
- 1. "Mind Your Manners" Released: July 19, 2011; 2. "Ray Charles" Released: November 14, 2011

Professional ratings
Review scores
Source	Rating
AllMusic	3.5/5 stars
BLARE	3/5 stars
Rolling Stone	2/5 stars

Breakfast is the debut studio album by American rap duo Chiddy Bang, released in the United States through I.R.S. Records and Virgin Records on February 21, 2012 and outside the U.S. through Regal Recordings on March 5, 2012. The album includes the singles "Mind Your Manners" and "Ray Charles".

== Singles ==
- "Mind Your Manners" featuring Swedish DJs and duo Icona Pop was released on July 19, 2011 as the album's lead single. The song did not make it to the Billboard Hot 100 but peaked on the Bubbling Under Hot 100 Singles chart at number 15, as well as reaching number 19 on the Top Heatseekers.
- "Ray Charles" was released on November 14, 2011 as the album's second single.
- "Handclaps & Guitars" was the iTunes Single of the Week for the week of February 21 to 28, 2012.

== Commercial performance ==
The album debuted at number 8 on the Billboard 200 with 31,000 copies sold in its first week. As of January 2013, the album has sold 75,000 copies.

== Track listing ==
No.	Title	Length
1.	"Intro"	1:22
2.	"Breakfast"	2:58
3.	"Handclaps & Guitars"	2:48
4.	"Mind Your Manners" (featuring Icona Pop)	3:17
5.	"Ray Charles"	3:43
6.	"Does She Love Me?"	3:41
7.	"Run It Back" (featuring Shirazi)	4:03
8.	"Out 2 Space" (featuring Gordon Voidwell)	3:13
9.	"Whatever We Want"	3:04
10.	"Interlude"	0:44
11.	"Talking to Myself"	4:12
12.	"Happening" (featuring V V Brown)	3:16
13.	"Baby Roulette"	3:42
14.	"4th Quarter"	3:20
15.	"Rescue Me" (UK bonus track) (with You Me at Six)	3:17

== Charts ==
=== Weekly charts ===
Chart (2012)	Peak position
Scottish Albums (OCC)	64
Swiss Albums (Schweizer Hitparade)	50
UK Albums (OCC)	51
US Billboard 200	8
US Top R&B/Hip-Hop Albums (Billboard)	2

=== Year-end charts ===
Chart (2012)	Position
US Top R&B/Hip-Hop Albums (Billboard)	78

== Release history ==
Region	Date	Format	Label
United States	February 21, 2012	Digital download, CD	Virgin Records, I.R.S. Records
Worldwide	March 5, 2012	Digital download, CD	Regal Recordings
