= Peanut Butter and Swelly =

Mixtape by Chiddy Bang
- Released: May 27, 2011 (US)
- Genres: Hip-hop; electronica; Afrobeat; club pop
- Length: 48:07

Chiddy Bang chronology
The Preview (2010)	Peanut Butter and Swelly (2011)	Breakfast (2012)

Peanut Butter and Swelly is a mixtape by the Philadelphia hip-hop duo Chiddy Bang. It was released in May 2011 as a prequel to their debut album Breakfast. The third mixtape released by the group, it consists of 15 tracks featuring several other rappers including Trae tha Truth and Mac Miller. The mixtape contains many references to the Guinness World Record for longest freestyle rap set by the group's rapper Chidera Anamege.

== Track listing ==
1. "Cameras"
2. "The Whistle Song"
3. "Heatwave" (featuring Mac Miller, Casey Veggies and Trae tha Truth)
4. "Too Much Soul"
5. "Baby Roulette" (featuring Train)
6. "Guinness Flow"
7. "I Can't Stop (Freestyle)"
8. "Jacuzzi (Lost in the Vapors)"
9. "High as a Ceiling" (featuring eLDee the Don)
10. "Always (On My Grizzly)" (feat. eLDee the Don)
11. "Y.T.M.O.S.H.? Y.A.S.N. (You Think My Old Shit Hard? You Ain't Seen Nothin')"
12. "Dancing with the DJ" (remix)
13. "Nobody Has It Down"
14. "All Over" (featuring Gordon Voidwell)
15. "When You've Got Music" (featuring the Knocks)
