= Opposite of Adults =

2010 single by Chiddy Bang

Single by Chiddy Bang

from the album The Swelly Express and the EP The Preview
- Released: February 21, 2010
- Genre: Hip hop, indie rock
- Length: 3:11
- Label: Regal
- Songwriters: Ben Goldwasser, Chidera Anamege, Andrew VanWyngarden, Noah Beresin
- Producer: Xaphoon Jones

Chiddy Bang singles chronology
"Opposite of Adults" (2010)	"Truth" (2010)

Music video
- "Opposite of Adults" on YouTube

"Opposite of Adults" is a song by American hip hop duo Chiddy Bang. It was released in the United Kingdom on February 21, 2010. The song contains samples of "Kids" by MGMT. It was released in the United States on April 20, 2010. It was released online to blogs under the name "Kids" approximately one year prior to that. In late 2010, "Opposite of Adults" was featured as the background music for the Need for Speed: Hot Pursuit video game commercial, as well as in the game, in an episode of Rob Dyrdek's Fantasy Factory, and in episode 8 of Friday Night Lights's fifth season. The song was also used in the trailer for 30 Minutes or Less. It was also the goal song for Team North America (World Cup of Hockey 2016).

== Critical reception ==
Fraser McAlpine of BBC Chart Blog awarded the song five stars and gave a positive review, stating:

"Oh now this is the kind of thing we can all get behind, isn't it? Song titles as crossword clues! You don't even have to know that this is largely based on reswizzled chunks of the MGMT song 'Kids', because you can work it out from the title".

== Chart performance ==
On February 28, 2010, "Opposite of Adults" entered the UK Singles Chart at No.12. The following week, the single fell four places to No.16, where it remained for three consecutive weeks. On its fifth week in the chart, the single fell three places to No.19. The following week, the single fell a further two places to No.21. On April 11, 2010, the single fell to No.22 and the following week fell a further eight to No.30, marking the single's eighth week in the UK Singles Chart.

The single also debuted on the Irish Singles Chart on February 25, 2010, at No.49. The following week, the single climbed 17 places to No.32, which was followed by a further 12 places to No.20 the week after. On March 18, 2010, the single climbed four places to No.16 and the following week climbed a further three places to No.13. On April 1, 2010, the single climbed three places to its current peak of No.10, marking Chiddy Bang's first top 10 hit in Ireland. However, on its seventh week in the chart, the single fell five places to No.15. On April 15, 2010, the single fell a further six places to No.21.

The single also managed to debut on the Australian Singles Chart and the New Zealand Singles Chart on April 5, 2010, at a peak of No.36. The following week, the single remained at No.36. In its fourth week in the chart, the single rose 11 places to No.22. It has thus far peaked at No.10 in Australia while in New Zealand, it achieved a top ten peak of No.8.

"Opposite of Adults" debuted at No.90 on the Billboard Hot 100 on Jul. 31 2010 and re-entered at No.100 on Jan. 15 2011.

== Track listing ==
12" vinyl

1. "Opposite of Adults" – 3:15
2. "Chiddy Freestyle" – 2:09
3. "Sooner or Later" – 3:16

Digital download

1. "Opposite of Adults" – 3:15
2. "Chiddy Freestyle" – 2:09
3. "Sooner or Later" – 3:16

7" vinyl

1. "Opposite of Adults" - 3:15
2. "Sooner or Later" - 3:16

== Charts ==
=== Weekly charts ===
Chart (2010)	Peak position
Australia (ARIA)	10
Austria (Ö3 Austria Top 40)	60
Belgium (Ultratip Bubbling Under Flanders)	12
Belgium (Ultratip Bubbling Under Wallonia)	30
Germany (GfK)	81
Ireland (IRMA)	10
Japan Hot 100 (Billboard)	57
New Zealand (Recorded Music NZ)	8
Poland (Polish Airplay New)	5
Scottish Singles Sales (Official Charts)	10
Switzerland (Schweizer Hitparade)	18
UK Singles (Official Charts)	12
US Billboard Hot 100	90
US Heatseekers Songs (Billboard)	7

=== Year-end charts ===
Chart (2010)	Position
Australia (ARIA)	70

== Certifications ==
Region	Certification	Certified units/sales
Australia (ARIA)	Platinum	70,000^{^}
New Zealand (RMNZ)	Gold	7,500^{*}
United Kingdom (BPI)	Gold	400,000^{‡}
^{*} Sales figures based on certification alone.^{^} Shipments figures based on certification alone.^{‡} Sales+streaming figures based on certification alone.

== Release history ==
Region	Date	Format	Label
United Kingdom	February 21, 2010	Digital download	EMI
United Kingdom	February 22, 2010	12" single	Regal Recordings
United Kingdom	April 17, 2010 (Record Store Day)	7-inch single	Regal Recordings
