= Chiddy Bang =

American rapper (born 1987)

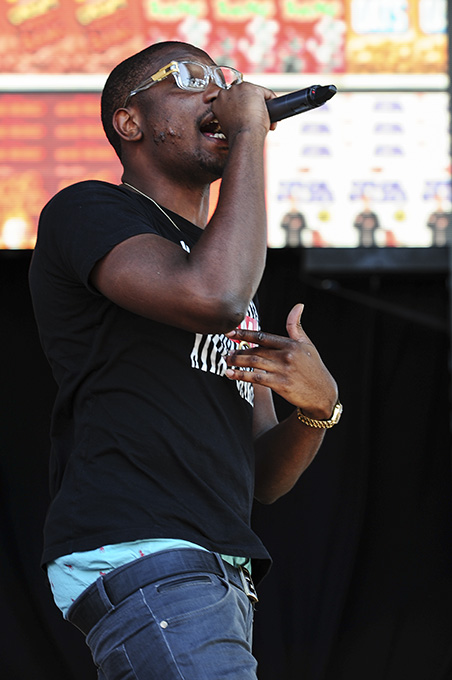
- Chiddy Bang in 2012

Background information
- Born: February 21, 1987 (age 39)
- Origin: Philadelphia, Pennsylvania, U.S.
- Genre: Alternative hip hop
- Years active: 2009–present
- Labels: I.R.S; Parlophone; EMI; Regal
- Members: Chidera Anamege
- Past members: Xaphoon Jones

Chidera Anamege, now known by his stage name Chiddy Bang, is an American rapper from Philadelphia. Prior to its breakup, Chiddy Bang was in an American hip hop duo consisting of Anamege, under the stage name Chiddy, and Noah Beresin, under the stage name Xaphoon Jones. The duo was introduced by former band member Zachary Sewall in late 2008 while the two were studying at Drexel University, in Beresin's hometown of Philadelphia. Anamege's sound is based on the fusion of hip hop and alternative using samples from artists such as Ellie Goulding, Radiohead, Sufjan Stevens, Passion Pit, MGMT, Matt and Kim and Yelle. In 2013, Beresin left the group to focus on producing, and Anamege became a solo artist, with Beresin playing the role as frequent collaborator.

== History ==
=== 2009: Formation and breakthrough ===
In late February 2009, the popular music blog Pretty Much Amazing showcased five songs by the duo that were on their Myspace account. Shortly after, the group gained some following in the underground among music blogs and local colleges playing a notably packed show at Swarthmore College and Middlebury College in April 2009.

Pretty Much Amazing continued to occasionally release new songs from the duo and in November 2009 debuted the group's first free mixtape entitled The Swelly Express. On April 28, 2011 during the first-ever MTV O Music Awards, Anamege broke the Guinness World Record for Longest Freestyle Rap and Longest Marathon Rapping Record by freestyling for 9 hours, 18 minutes, and 22 seconds, stealing the throne from rapper M-Eighty, who originally broke the record in 2009 by rapping for 9 hours, 15 minutes and 15 seconds. Anamege had also beat Canadian rapper D.O. for Longest Marathon Rapping session, the previous record being for 8 hours and 45 minutes.

The duo have had appearances in several video games, such as in the sports game NBA 2K12 with their song "Here We Go" from their EP The Preview, featuring rapper Q-Tip of hip hop group A Tribe Called Quest, as well as in Madden NFL 12 with their song "Mind Your Manners" featuring Swedish electropop duo Icona Pop. Their single "Opposite of Adults" was included in the racing game Need for Speed: Hot Pursuit, in addition to being chosen as the goal song for Team North America in the 2016 World Cup of Hockey as well. The singles "Happening" and "Shine" were included on the soundtracks to the movies Sex Tape and Sisters respectively.

=== 2009–2010: The Swelly Express and Air Swell ===
The Swelly Express was the debut mixtape from the duo. The mixtape quickly gained a music following from its online hit "Opposite of Adults" (which includes a sample from MGMT's song "Kids"). The Swelly Express tells the story of the duo's rise in the music business and their experiences with record labels, it was first released and promoted through the music blog Pretty Much Amazing. The mixtape was praised by fans for the production style, including samples from Passion Pit ("Truth"), Tinie Tempah and Pogo ("Expialidocious"). It also contains a guest appearance from Black Thought of The Roots. The songs "Opposite of Adults", "Truth", "Fresh Like Us", "All Things Go" (including a sample from Sufjan Steven's "Chicago"), and "Dream Chasin'" have been re-released for download via the iTunes Store since the release of the mixtape.

On April 8, 2010, the duo followed up The Swelly Express with the mini-mixtape Air Swell. As the duo had a strong following in the UK, many popular UK artists were featured on the mixtape, including La Roux, Kate Nash, Ellie Goulding, Tinie Tempah and Gorillaz.

The UK-based EMI subsidiary Parlophone had heard about the group through their online following. According to president Miles Leonard, they had been listening to the song "Opposite of Adults" in the office all summer when A&R manager Ollie Slaney said: "As we keep on listening to this maybe we should do something with it." The duo signed to Parlophone/EMI with plans to release a full-length album in 2011.

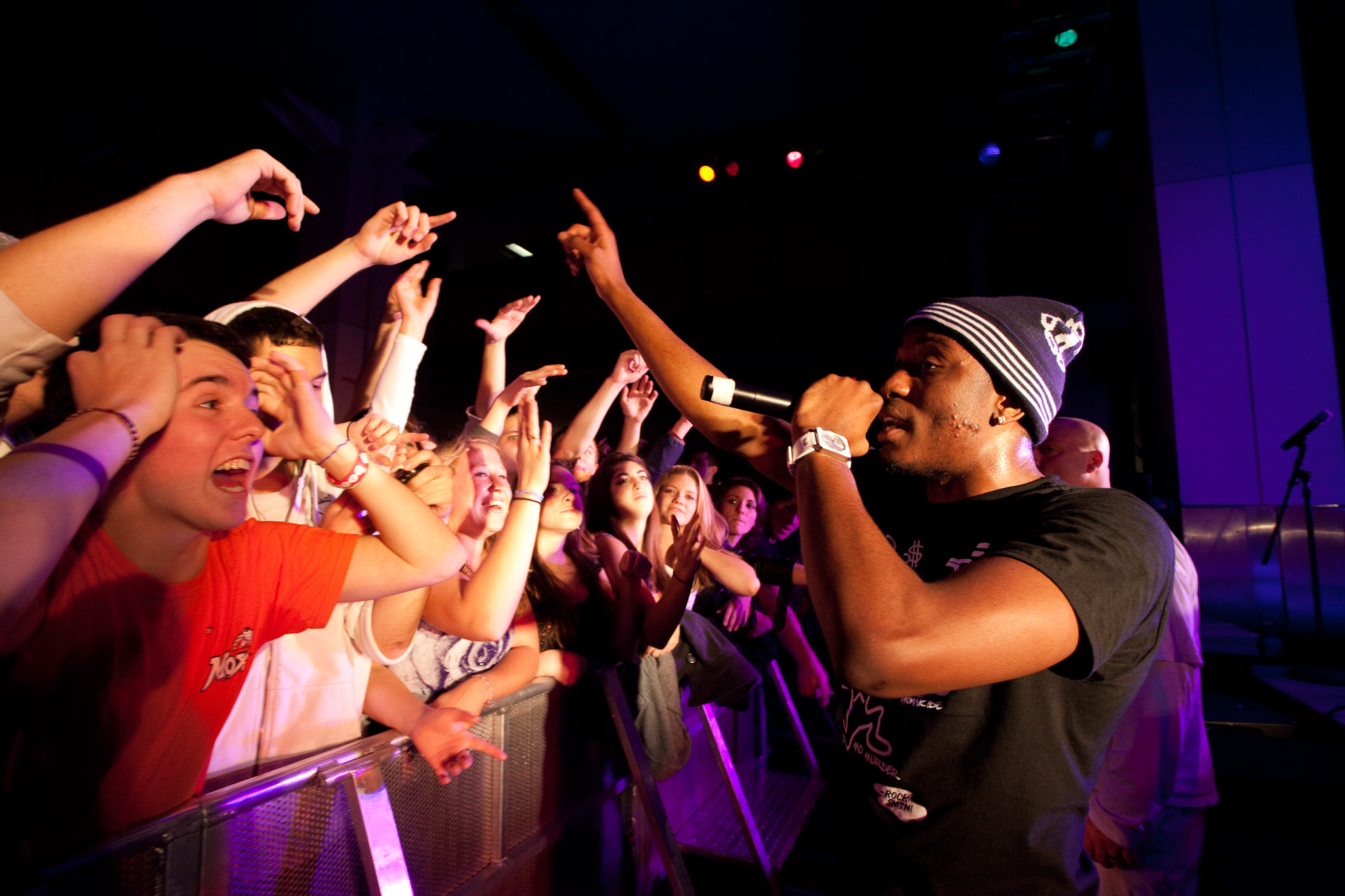
Chiddy Bang performing at Rensselaer Polytechnic Institute on December 4, 2010

That same year the band headlined their first tour, The Swelly Life Tour featuring Donnis and XV. The duo also opened up for Tinie Tempah on his UK Disc-Overy tour. Chiddy Bang have toured extensively throughout colleges nationwide and hit numerous festivals such as Lollapalooza, Austin City Limits, Bamboozle, Bonnaroo, Wireless Festival, Glastonbury and Electric Forest Festival.

=== 2011–2012: Peanut Butter and Swelly and Breakfast ===
Peanut Butter and Swelly is the third mixtape by the duo. It was released on May 27, 2011 as a prequel to their upcoming debut album Breakfast. It consists of 15 tracks featuring fellow rappers including Trae tha Truth, Casey Veggies and Mac Miller as well as singer eLDee the Don and electronic music duo The Knocks. The mixtape contains many references to Anamege's Guinness World Record for Longest Freestyle Rap.

The duo initially planned a late summer release for their debut studio album Breakfast in 2011. This was later changed to November 2011 and again to the following year in February 2012 when they opted to release a single from the album, "Ray Charles", instead. The album was released ahead of schedule on February 22, 2012, at midnight via iTunes and is available in the Google Play Music Store, iTunes, and Walmart. The first single "Mind Your Manners" premiered on June 29, 2011, and includes samples from Swedish pop band Icona Pop. The single is also on the soundtrack for the EA Sports video game Madden NFL 12. On February 8, Chiddy Bang released a snippet of the song "Breakfast" as a teaser for the album. An "Exclusive Spotify Freestyle" was released on February 17 with cover art similar to that of the album Breakfast. A series of "Mind Your Manners" remixes, including one with Travie McCoy, were released later in 2012 in the form of two EPs (one featuring a previously unreleased song titled "Twisted").

=== 2013–2020: Baggage Claim, Noah Beresin's departure, and Adventure Records ===
On June 18, 2014, it was announced that Beresin would be stepping back as an artist and focus on his producing. Anamege announced that he would be releasing a mixtape in late September called Baggage Claim, and released the first single, "Breathe", on August 19, 2013. Anamege released a second single on September 12, 2013, titled "HeartBeat" (featuring Two Guyz). On October 9 Anamege announced via Twitter that Baggage Claim would be released October 11, "Dropping baggage claim on Friday!". It was subsequently pushed back to October 16, 2013, and the release date is now September 2014, he announced this via SKEE radio on the show Another Dirty Night Radio, and also via Twitter saying a mixtape would drop late summer. Anamege ended up delaying the track again, and on February 22, 2015, he confirmed on Instagram that the "album" Baggage Claim will come in the spring of 2015. Also on the same day, Anamege posted on Facebook to say that he was "90 percent done with my album!". He also said that he "even managed to put together a few surprises". However, to this day, Baggage Claim remains unreleased.

In 2015, Anamege either created his own record label, or was signed to one, by the name of 'ADVENTURE RECORDS' in Pennsylvania which was filed at the chamber of commerce as a Domestic Limited-Liability Company on July 21, 2015. This label has been credited as both the copyright and phonographic rights holder for all of Chiddy Bang's releases since then.

However, Chiddy Bang did not release any music in the years 2013-2016 until returning with a trio of singles in 2017: "Been a While", "Same Old Thing" (produced by Russ), and "Came a Long Way" (featuring BeWill). Another trio of singles was released in 2018: "Does it Hurt?", "TLC", and "Ride", but the artist again ceased to release music in either 2019 or 2020.

=== 2021–present: Singles, Lunch, Keep the Change, and Saved by the Swell ===
Two singles titled "Guava" and "Down" came out in 2021, followed by a total of 13 single releases in 2022 leading up to Chiddy Bang's long-awaited sophomore album Lunch in January 2023, followed two and a half months later by Keep the Change on April 7, 2023 and Saved by the Swell in November 2023. Numerous singles were released throughout 2023 along with the trio of albums. Chiddy Bang then started 2024 by adding two more singles to his discography, "Need You" in January and "Back and Forth" in March.

== World Freestyle Record ==
On April 29, 2011, after rapping for 9 hours, 18 minutes, and 22 seconds at MTV's inaugural O Music Awards in Las Vegas, Chidera "Chiddy" Anamege earned himself a place in the Guinness Book of World Records for Longest Freestyle and Longest Continuous Rap, a title previously held by Canadian rapper D. O., in August 2003 at 8 hours and 45 minutes and 23 seconds. He told XXLmag.com that it was "definitely a surreal experience." He also mentioned that to earn the record he had to keep rapping even during the two bathroom breaks he took.

However, this record has subsequently been broken numerous times, including by George Watsky and the current record holder, Japan's PONEY, at 48 hours, 1 minute, and 10 seconds.

== Discography ==
Studio albums

- Breakfast (2012)
- Lunch (2023)
- Keep the Change (2023)
- Saved by the Swell (2023)
- Chiddy (2024)
