= Enter Shikari discography =

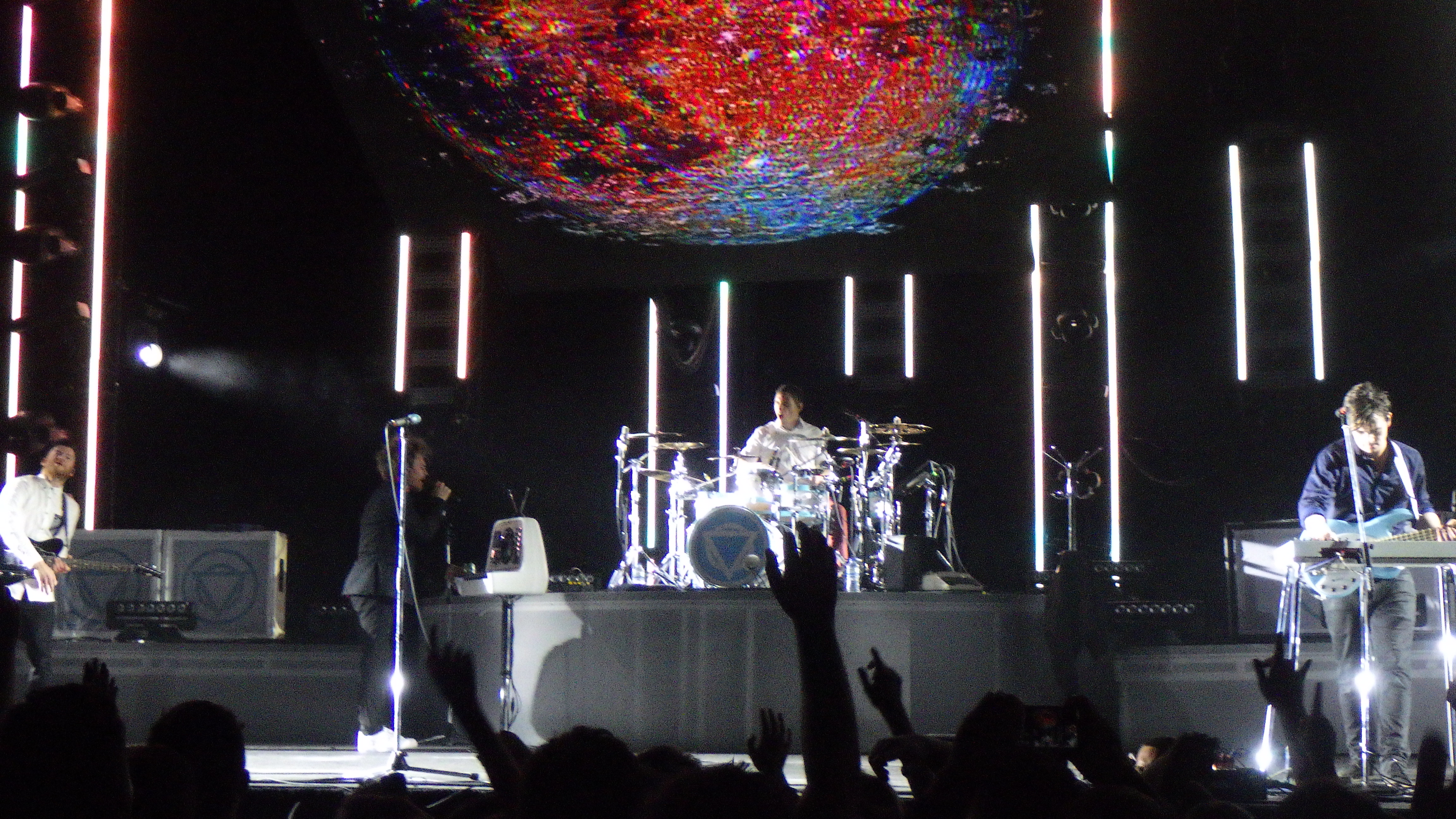
- Enter Shikari performing live in 2017
- Studio albums: 8
- Extended plays: 8
- Live albums: 11
- Compilation albums: 5 (4 + 1 remix album)
- Singles: 41
- Video albums: 7
- Music videos: 34
- Promotional singles: 7

This is the complete discography of English rock band Enter Shikari. They have, released eight studio albums, eleven live albums, eight EPs and 41 singles.

== Albums ==
=== Studio albums ===
| Title | Details | Peak chart positions | | | | | | | | | | Sales | Certifications |
| Title | Details | UK | UK Rock | AUS | BEL | GER | IRL | JPN | NLD | SCO | US | Sales | Certifications |
|---|---|---|---|---|---|---|---|---|---|---|---|---|---|
| Take to the Skies | Released: 19 March 2007; Label: Ambush Reality; Formats: CD, CD+DVD, DL, LP | 4 | 1 | — | 89 | 93 | 26 | 31 | — | 6 | — | | BPI: Gold |
| Common Dreads | Released: 15 June 2009; Label: Ambush Reality; Formats: CD, CD+DVD, DL, LP | 16 | — | 55 | 94 | 96 | — | 77 | — | 22 | — | | BPI: Gold |
| A Flash Flood of Colour | Released: 16 January 2012; Label: Ambush Reality; Formats: CD, CD+DVD, DL, LP | 4 | 1 | 32 | 42 | 23 | 69 | 81 | 74 | 3 | 67 | | BPI: Silver |
| The Mindsweep | Released: 19 January 2015; Label: Ambush Reality; Formats: CD, CD+DVD, CD+DVD+LP, DL, LP | 6 | 2 | 19 | 68 | 17 | 59 | 142 | 26 | 8 | 166 | | BPI: Silver |
| The Spark | Released: 22 September 2017; Label: Ambush Reality, Play It Again Sam; Formats: CD, CS, DL, LP | 5 | 2 | 56 | 68 | 60 | — | — | — | 4 | — | | |
| Nothing Is True & Everything Is Possible | Released: 17 April 2020; Label: Ambush Reality, So, Silva Screen; Formats: CD, CS, DL, LP | 2 | 1 | — | 80 | 35 | — | — | — | 2 | — | | |
| A Kiss for the Whole World | Released: 21 April 2023; Label: Ambush Reality, So; Formats: CD, CS, DL, LP | 1 | 1 | 49 | — | 13 | — | — | — | 3 | — | UK: 13,513 | |
| Lose Your Self | Release: 10 April 2026; Label: So; Formats: CD, CS, DL, LP | 16 | 1 | 45 | — | — | — | — | — | 7 | — | | |
"—" denotes releases that did not chart.

=== Compilation albums ===
| Title | Details | Peak chart positions | | | | | | |
| Title | Details | UK | UK Sales | UK Indie | UK Phys | UK Rock | UK Vinyl | SCO |
|---|---|---|---|---|---|---|---|---|
| The Zone | Released: 12 November 2007; Label: Ambush Reality; Formats: CD, DL | — | — | 4 | — | 3 | — | — |
| Tribalism | Released: 22 February 2010; Label: Ambush Reality; Formats: CD, DL | 63 | — | — | 67 | 3 | — | 64 |
| Moratorium (Broadcasts from the Interruption) | Released: 16 April 2021; Label: So Recordings; Formats: LP, digital, CD | — | 17 | 5 | 15 | — | 7 | 19 |
| Dancing on the Frontline | Released: 5 July 2024; Label: So Recordings; Formats: LP, digital | — | 6 | 3 | 5 | 1 | 3 | 7 |
"—" denotes releases that did not chart.

=== Remix albums ===
| Title | Details | Peak chart positions | | | | | |
| Title | Details | UK | UK Sales | UK Dance | UK Indie | UK Phys | UK Vinyl |
|---|---|---|---|---|---|---|---|
| The Mindsweep: Hospitalised | Released: 30 October 2015; Label: Ambush Reality, Hospital; Formats: CD, DL, LP | 68 | 57 | 10 | 15 | 62 | 8 |

=== Live albums ===
| Title | Details | Peak chart positions | | | | | | |
| Title | Details | UK | UK Sales | UK Indie | UK Phys | UK Rock | UK Vinyl | SCO |
|---|---|---|---|---|---|---|---|---|
| Live at Milton Keynes – Bootleg Series Volume 1 | Released: 15 June 2009; Label: Ambush Reality; Format: CD | — | — | — | — | — | — | — |
| Live at Rock City – Bootleg Series Volume 2 | Released: 22 February 2010; Label: Ambush Reality; Formats: CD, LP | — | — | — | — | 16 | — | — |
| Live from Planet Earth – Bootleg Series Volume 3 | Released: 8 July 2011; Label: Ambush Reality; Formats: CD, CD+DVD, DL | 197 | — | 31 | — | — | — | — |
| Live in London. W6. March 2012. – Bootleg Series Volume 4 | Released: 10 December 2012; Label: Ambush Reality; Formats: LP+DVD, DL | — | — | — | — | — | — | — |
| Live in the Barrowland – Bootleg Series Volume 5 | Released: 7 December 2013; Label: Ambush Reality; Formats: CD+DVD | — | — | — | — | — | — | — |
| Enter Shikari Live at Deezer | Released: 20 April 2016; Label: PIAS; Format: stream | — | — | — | — | — | — | — |
| Live at Alexandra Palace | Released: 18 November 2016; Label: Ambush Reality; Formats: CD, DL, LP | 93 | 73 | 15 | 65 | 6 | 12 | — |
| Live at Alexandra Palace 2 | Released: 15 February 2019; Label: Ambush Reality; Formats: DL, LP | — | 63 | 8 | 62 | 4 | 5 | 62 |
| Take to the Skies: Live in Moscow. May 2017 | Released: 15 February 2019; Label: Ambush Reality; Formats: DL, LP | — | 91 | 16 | 79 | 6 | 11 | 64 |
| Live at Alexandra Palace 3 | Released: 21 April 2023; Label: Ambush Reality, So; Formats: LP | 15 | 6 | 2 | 6 | 3 | 25 | 6 |
| Wembley. London. 17th February 2024 | Released: 11 July 2025; Label: Ambush Reality, So; Format: LP, DL | — | 28 | 13 | 25 | 4 | 9 | 44 |

== Extended plays ==
| Title | Details | Peak chart positions | | | |
| Title | Details | UK Indie | UK Phys | UK Rock | UK Vinyl |
|---|---|---|---|---|---|
| Nodding Acquaintance | Released: 2003; Label: Self-released; Formats: CD | — | — | — | — |
| Sorry You're Not a Winner | Released: 2004; Label: Self-released; Formats: CD | — | — | — | — |
| Anything Can Happen in the Next Half Hour | Released: 2004; Label: Self-released; Formats: CD | — | — | — | — |
| Rout Remixes | Released: 16 January 2012; Label: Ambush Reality; Formats: 7" vinyl | — | — | — | — |
| Live in London NW5 2012. EP | Released: 18 May 2012; Label: Ambush Reality; Formats: DL | — | — | — | — |
| Rat Race EP | Released: 18 May 2013; Label: Ambush Reality; Formats: DL, 12" vinyl | 10 | 5 | 2 | 11 |
| Covers | Released: 5 December 2015; Label: Ambush Reality; Formats: DL, 7" vinyl | — | 10 | — | 5 |
| Live & Acoustic at Alexandra Palace | Released: 1 February 2016; Label: Ambush Reality; Formats: DL | — | — | — | — |
| Live Slow. Die Old. | Released: 22 September 2017; Label: Ambush Reality; Formats: 12" vinyl | 36 | — | — | 20 |

== Singles ==
| Year | Title | Peak chart positions | | | | | | Certifications | Album |
| Year | Title | UK | UK Rock | UK Indie | BEL (FL) | SCO | US Dance Sales | Certifications | Album |
|---|---|---|---|---|---|---|---|---|---|
| 2006 | "Mothership" | 151 | — | 24 | — | — | — | | Non-album single |
| 2006 | "Sorry You're Not a Winner/OK Time for Plan B" | 114 | — | — | — | — | — | BPI: Silver | Take to the Skies |
| 2007 | "Anything Can Happen in the Next Half Hour..." | 27 | 1 | 1 | — | — | — | | Take to the Skies |
| 2007 | "Jonny Sniper" | 75 | 2 | 3 | — | 31 | — | | Take to the Skies |
| 2008 | "We Can Breathe in Space, They Just Don't Want Us to Escape" | 80 | 1 | 3 | — | 22 | — | | Non-album single |
| 2009 | "Juggernauts" | 28 | — | — | — | 9 | — | | Common Dreads |
| 2009 | "No Sleep Tonight" | 63 | 2 | — | — | 4 | — | | Common Dreads |
| 2010 | "Thumper" | — | 7 | — | — | — | — | | Tribalism |
| 2010 | "Destabilise" | 65 | 1 | — | — | 60 | — | | A Flash Flood of Colour (Redux Version) |
| 2011 | "Quelle Surprise" | 113 | 5 | 15 | — | — | — | | A Flash Flood of Colour (Redux Version) |
| 2011 | "Sssnakepit" | 62 | 1 | 11 | — | 62 | — | | A Flash Flood of Colour |
| 2011 | "Gandhi Mate, Gandhi" | 112 | 3 | 10 | — | — | — | | A Flash Flood of Colour |
| 2012 | "Arguing with Thermometers" | — | 9 | 37 | — | — | — | | A Flash Flood of Colour |
| 2012 | "Warm Smiles Do Not Make You Welcome Here" | — (Note: "Warm Smiles Do Not Make You Welcome Here" did not enter the UK Singles Chart, but peaked at number 4 on the UK Physical Singles Chart".) | 17 | 47 | — | — | — | | A Flash Flood of Colour |
| 2013 | "The Paddington Frisk" | 128 | — | 18 | — | — | — | | Rat Race |
| 2013 | "Radiate" | 79 | 3 | 9 | — | 88 | 4 | | Rat Race |
| 2013 | "Rat Race" | 77 | 2 | 10 | — | — | — | | Rat Race |
| 2014 | "The Last Garrison" | — | 9 | 21 | — | — | — | | The Mindsweep |
| 2015 | "Anaesthetist" | — | 9 | 17 | — | — | — | | The Mindsweep |
| 2015 | "Slipshod" | — (Note: "Slipshod" did not enter the UK Singles Chart, but peaked at number 3 on the UK Physical Singles Chart and number 2 on the UK Vinyl Singles Chart".) | 16 | — | — | — | — | | The Mindsweep: Hospitalised |
| 2016 | "Redshift" | — | 14 | 37 | — | — | — | | Live Slow. Die Old. |
| 2016 | "Hoodwinker" | — | 28 | — | — | — | — | | Live Slow. Die Old. |
| 2017 | "Supercharge" (featuring Big Narstie) | — | — | — | — | — | — | | Live Slow. Die Old. |
| 2017 | "Live Outside" | — | 21 | — | — | — | — | | The Spark |
| 2017 | "Rabble Rouser" | — | 40 | — | — | — | — | | The Spark |
| 2017 | "The Sights" | — | — | — | — | — | — | | The Spark |
| 2018 | "Take My Country Back" | — | — | — | — | — | — | | The Spark |
| 2019 | "Undercover Agents" | — | — | — | — | — | — | | The Spark |
| 2019 | "Stop the Clocks" | — (Note: "Stop the Clocks" did not enter the UK Singles Chart, but peaked at number 81 on the UK Physical Singles Chart".) | — | — | — | — | — | | Non-album single |
| 2020 | "The Dreamer's Hotel" | — | 24 | — | — (Note: "The Dreamer's Hotel" did not enter the Flanders Ultratop 50, but entered the Ultratop "Extra Tips".) | — | — | | Nothing Is True & Everything Is Possible |
| 2020 | "The King" | — | — | — | — | — | — | | Nothing Is True & Everything Is Possible |
| 2020 | "T.I.N.A." | — | — | — | — | — | — | | Nothing Is True & Everything Is Possible |
| 2020 | "The Great Unknown" | — | — | — | — | — | — | | Nothing Is True & Everything Is Possible |
| 2022 | "The Void Stares Back" (with Wargasm) | — (Note: "The Void Stares Back/Bull" did not enter the UK Singles Chart, but peaked at number 3 on the UK Singles Sales Chart, number 2 on the UK Physical Singles Chart and number 2 on the UK Vinyl Singles Chart".) | — | — | — | — | — | | Dancing on the Frontline |
| 2022 | "Bull" (featuring Cody Frost) | — (Note: "The Void Stares Back/Bull" did not enter the UK Singles Chart, but peaked at number 3 on the UK Singles Sales Chart, number 2 on the UK Physical Singles Chart and number 2 on the UK Vinyl Singles Chart".) | — | — | — | — | — | | Dancing on the Frontline |
| 2023 | "(Pls) Set Me on Fire" | — | — | — | — | — | — | | A Kiss for the Whole World |
| 2023 | "It Hurts" | — | — | — | — | — | — | | A Kiss for the Whole World |
| 2023 | "Bloodshot" | — | — | — | — | — | — | | A Kiss for the Whole World |
| 2023 | "Strangers" (with Aviva) | — | — | — | — | — | — | | Dancing on the Frontline |
| 2024 | "Losing My Grip" (featuring Jason Aalon Butler of Fever 333) | — | — | — | — | — | — | | Dancing on the Frontline |
| 2024 | "Goldfish" (Shikari Sound System Remix) | — | — | — | — | — | — | | Dancing on the Frontline |
| 2026 | "Higher Ground" | — | — | — | — | — | — | | |
| 2026 | "Lightyears" | — | — | — | — | — | — | | |

=== Promotional singles ===
| Year | Title | Album |
|---|---|---|
| 2007 | "Acid Nation" | Non-album singles |
| 2007 | "Kicking Back on the Surface of Your Cheek/Keep It on Ice" | Non-album singles |
| 2009 | "Antwerpen" | Common Dreads |
| 2009 | "Wall" (Remix) | Non-album singles |
| 2011 | "Motherstep/Mothership" | Non-album singles |
| 2012 | "Pack of Thieves" | A Flash Flood of Colour |
| 2015 | "Torn Apart" | The Mindsweep |

== Remixes ==
There have been numerous remixes of Enter Shikari songs:

| Song | Remix | Appears on |
|---|---|---|
| "Anything Can Happen in the Next Half Hour" | Grayedout Remix | |
| "Anything Can Happen in the Next Half Hour" | Colonopenbracket Remix | |
| "Jonny Sniper" | Ocelot Remix | Jonny Sniper iTunes download |
| "Jonny Sniper" | Emotiquon Remix | Jonny Sniper iTunes download |
| "Adieu" | Routron 5000 Remix | The Zone EP |
| "We Can Breathe in Space" | Grayedout Remix | "We Can Breathe in Space, They Just Don't Want Us to Escape" |
| "We Can Breathe in Space" | Rout Remix | "We Can Breathe in Space, They Just Don't Want Us to Escape" |
| "Sorry, You're Not a Winner" | Rout Remix | "We Can Breathe in Space, They Just Don't Want Us to Escape" |
| "Juggernauts" | Nero Remix | "Juggernauts" |
| "Juggernauts" | Blue Bear's True Tiger Remix | "Juggernauts" |
| "No Sleep Tonight" | The Qemists Remix | "No Sleep Tonight" |
| "No Sleep Tonight" | Rout Remix | "No Sleep Tonight" |
| "No Sleep Tonight" | Mistabishi Remix | "No Sleep Tonight" |
| "No Sleep Tonight" | Lights Go Blue Remix | "No Sleep Tonight" |
| "No Sleep Tonight" | Stenchman Remix | Rout and Stenchman Charity Remixes for MSF |
| "Zzzonked" | Stenchman Remix | Rout and Stenchman Charity Remixes for MSF |
| "Thumper" | Rout Remix | Rout and Stenchman Charity Remixes for MSF |
| "Solidarity" | Rout Remix | |
| "Wall" | Andy Gray Radio Mix | |
| "Wall" | High Contrast Remix | Tribalism |
| "Destabilise" | Rout Remix | "Quelle Surprise" |
| "Destabilise" | Creatures of Love Remix | "Quelle Surprise" |
| "Quelle Surprise" | Rout VIP Remix | A Flash Flood of Colour UK & Ireland iTunes Deluxe Edition |
| "Sssnakepit" | Hamilton Remix | "Sssnakepit" |
| "Sssnakepit" | Rout Remix | "Sssnakepit" |
| "Sssnakepit" | Serial Killaz Remix | "Sssnakepit" |
| "Arguing with Thermometers" | Calvertron Remix | Arguing with Thermometers (Remixes) - EP |
| "Arguing with Thermometers" | Taz Buckfaster Remix | Arguing with Thermometers (Remixes) - EP |
| "Arguing with Thermometers" | Goth-Trad Remix | Arguing with Thermometers (Remixes) - EP |
| "Warm Smiles Do Not Make You Welcome Here" | Mosquito Mix | "A Flash Flood of Colour (Redux Version)" |
| "Warm Smiles Do Not Make You Welcome Here" | Tek-one Mix | "A Flash Flood of Colour (Redux Version)" |
| "Warm Smiles Do Not Make You Welcome Here" | Azura Dub | "A Flash Flood of Colour (Redux Version)" |
| "Warm Smiles Do Not Make You Welcome Here" | Tyler Mae Mix | "A Flash Flood of Colour (Redux Version)" |
| "Warm Smiles Do Not Make You Welcome Here" | Alex Light Remix | "A Flash Flood of Colour (Redux Version)" |
| "Pack of Thieves" | Rory C Mix | "A Flash Flood of Colour (Redux Version)" |
| "Pack of Thieves" | Sgt. Rolfy'd Bell End Remix | "A Flash Flood of Colour (Redux Version)" |
| "Anaesthetist" | Koven Remix | "Anaesthetist" |
| "Anaesthetist" | Reso Remix | The Mindsweep: Hospitalised |
| "The Appeal & The Mindsweep I" | Metrik Remix | The Mindsweep: Hospitalised |
| "The One True Colour" | Keeno Remix | The Mindsweep: Hospitalised |
| "The Last Garrison" | S.P.Y Remix | The Mindsweep: Hospitalised |
| "Never Let Go of the Microscope" | Etherwood Remix | The Mindsweep: Hospitalised |
| "Myopia" | Bop Remix | The Mindsweep: Hospitalised |
| "Torn Apart" | Hugh Hardie Remix | The Mindsweep: Hospitalised |
| "Interlude" | The Erised Remix | The Mindsweep: Hospitalised |
| "The Bank of England" | Lynx Remix | The Mindsweep: Hospitalised |
| "There's a Price on Your Head" | Danny Byrd Remix | The Mindsweep: Hospitalised |
| "Dear Future Historians" | London Elektricity Remix | The Mindsweep: Hospitalised |
| "The Appeal & the Mindsweep II" | Krakota Remix | The Mindsweep: Hospitalised |
| "Slipshod" | Urbandawn Remix | The Mindsweep: Hospitalised |
| "Torn Apart" | Joe Ford Remix | |
| "Live Outside" | Shikari Sound System Remix | |
| "Rabble Rouser" | Dan Le Sac Remix | |
| "Rabble Rouser" | Shikari Sound System Remix | |

== Videography ==
=== Video albums ===
- 2007 – Live at the Astoria (bonus DVD with Take to the Skies)
- 2011 – Live from Planet Earth - Bootleg Series Volume 3
- 2012 – Phenakistiscope (bonus DVD with A Flash Flood of Colour)
- 2012 – Live in London. W6. March 2012. - Bootleg Series Volume 4
- 2013 – Live in the Barrowland - Bootleg Series Volume 5
- 2015 – Live in St. Petersburg, Russia - Bootleg Series Volume 6 (bonus DVD with The Mindsweep)
- 2015 – Live at Woodstock, Poland 2013 + Live at Download Festival, UK 2013 (bonus DVD with The Mindsweep)

=== Music videos ===
| Year | Song | Album | Director | Link |
|---|---|---|---|---|
| 2004 | "Anything Can Happen in the Next Half Hour" | Anything Can Happen in the Next Half Hour EP | ? | |
| 2006 | "Mothership" | Non-album song | Sam Crack^{α} | |
| 2006 | "Sorry You're Not a Winner" | Take to the Skies | Alex Smith^{α} | |
| 2007 | "Anything Can Happen in the Next Half Hour..." | Take to the Skies | Lawrence Hardy^{α} | |
| 2007 | "Johnny Sniper" | Take to the Skies | Gavin Free | |
| 2008 | "We Can Breathe in Space, They Just Don't Want Us to Escape" | Non-album song | Alex Smith^{α} | |
| 2009 | "Juggernauts" | Common Dreads | Shane Davey^{α} | |
| 2009 | "No Sleep Tonight" | Common Dreads | Shane Davey^{α} | |
| 2009 | "Zzzonked" | Common Dreads | Bob Harlow^{α} | |
| 2010 | "Thumper" | Tribalism | Joseph Pierce^{α} | |
| 2010 | "Destabilise" | Non-album song | Lawrence Hardy^{α} | |
| 2011 | "Destabilise"(Jonny & The Snipers Version) | Non-album song | Kode Media^{α} | |
| 2011 | "Quelle Surprise" | Non-album song | Kode Media^{α} | |
| 2011 | "Destabilise" (ROUT Remix) | Non-album song | Lawrence Hardy (edited by Judderman)^{α} | |
| 2011 | "Sssnakepit" | A Flash Flood of Colour | Kode Media^{α} | |
| 2011 | "Sssnakepit" (Hamilton Remix) | Non-album song | Kode Media^{α} | |
| 2012 | "Arguing with Thermometers" | A Flash Flood of Colour | Raul Gonzo^{α} | |
| 2012 | "Warm Smiles Do Not Make You Welcome Here" | A Flash Flood of Colour | Raul Gonzo^{α} | |
| 2012 | "Pack of Thieves" | A Flash Flood of Colour | Raul Gonzo^{α} | |
| 2013 | "Hello Tyrannosaurus, Meet Tyrannicide" | A Flash Flood of Colour | Jonathan Lindley^{α} | |
| 2013 | "The Paddington Frisk" | Non-album song | Jamie Korn | |
| 2013 | "Radiate" | Non-album song | Daniel Broadley^{α} | |
| 2013 | "Rat Race" | Non-album song | Mike Lee Thomas^{α} | |
| 2014 | "The Last Garrison" | The Mindsweep | Oleg Rooz^{α} | |
| 2014 | "Slipshod" | The Mindsweep | Peter MacAdams^{α} | |
| 2015 | "Anaesthesist" | The Mindsweep | Mike Tyler^{α} | |
| 2015 | "Torn Apart" | The Mindsweep | Mike Tyler^{α} | |
| 2015 | "There's a Price on Your Head" | The Mindsweep | Peter MacAdams^{α} | |
| 2015 | "Anaesthetist" (Reso Remix) | The Mindsweep: Hospitalised | Mike Tyler^{α} | |
| 2015 | "There's a Price on Your Head" (Danny Byrd Remix) | The Mindsweep: Hospitalised | Oleg Rooz^{α} | |
| 2015 | "There's a Price on Your Head - Jonny & The Snipers" | Non-album song | Rou Reynolds^{α} | |
| 2016 | "Redshift" | Non-album song | Mike Tyler | |
| 2016 | "Torn Apart" (Joe Ford Remix) | Non-album song | Oleg Rooz^{α} | |
| 2016 | "Hoodwinker" | Non-album song | Matt Farman & Rou Reynolds | |
| 2017 | "Live Outside" | The Spark | Bob Gallagher | |
| 2017 | "Rabble Rouser" | The Spark | Bob Gallagher | |
| 2017 | "The Sights" | The Spark | Kristian Young | |
| 2019 | "Stop the Clocks" | Non-album song | Polygon | |
| 2020 | "The Dreamer's Hotel" | Nothing Is True & Everything Is Possible | Polygon | |
| 2020 | "The Great Unknown" | Nothing Is True & Everything Is Possible | Polygon | |
| 2020 | "T.I.N.A" | Nothing Is True & Everything Is Possible | Matthew Taylor | |
| 2022 | "The Void Stares Back" (feat. Wargasm) | Non-album song | Elliott Gonzo | |
| 2022 | "Bull" (feat. Cody Frost) | Non-album song | Elliott Gonzo | |
| 2023 | "(Pls) Set Me on Fire" | A Kiss for the Whole World | Rou Reynolds | |
| 2023 | "It Hurts" | A Kiss for the Whole World | Rou Reynolds | |
| 2023 | "Bloodshot" | A Kiss for the Whole World | Rou Reynolds | |
| 2023 | "A Kiss for the Whole World x" | A Kiss for the Whole World | Rou Reynolds | |
| 2026 | "Find Out The Hard Way..." | Lose Your Self | Jasper Visuals | [41] |

As featured artist

| Year | Song | Album | Artist | Director | Link |
|---|---|---|---|---|---|
| 2011 | "Take It Back" (featuring Enter Shikari) | Spirit In The System | The Qemists | Stuart Birchall^{β} | |
^β=Are referenced in the description of the given video link.
