= The Spark World Tour =

2017–18 concert tour by Enter Shikari

- Tour by Enter Shikari
- Location: North America; Europe; Asia
- Associated album: The Spark
- Start date: 22 September 2017
- End date: 26 September 2018
- Legs: 4
- No. of shows: 33 in North America; 42 in Europe; 10 in Asia; 85 in total

Enter Shikari concert chronology
- A "Take to the Skies" Ten Year Celebration (2017); The Spark World Tour (2017–18); Stop the Clocks Tour (2018–19)

The Spark World Tour was a concert tour by rock band Enter Shikari, which took place throughout 2017 and 2018, in support of the band's fifth studio album The Spark, released on 22 September 2017. The tour followed the band's 10 year anniversary tour of their debut album Take to the Skies throughout early 2017.

== About ==
Following the band's Take to the Skies 10th anniversary tour, the band announced a UK arena tour with support from Lower than Atlantis and Astroid Boys which included the band's second performance at the famous Alexandra Palace in London. On July 31, 2017, the band played a warmup show at The Borderline in London where they debuted the tracks "Take My Country Back" and "Live Outside."

Following the album's release on 22 September 2017, the band played a series of intimate in-store shows including at HMV Oxford Street, London and Rough Trade NYC, Brooklyn. On October 3 the band announced they would be playing a North American tour in early 2018 with support from Milk Teeth including shows at the Music Hall of Williamsburg in Brooklyn and the El Rey Theatre in Los Angeles.

In April 2018, the band embarked on an Asia tour which included 5 dates in Japan supporting Crossfaith before a series of headline shows in Hong Kong, Thailand, Singapore, Taiwan and China.

== Songs Performed ==
Take to the Skies

- "Mothership"
- "Anything Can Happen in the Next Half Hour"
- "Labyrinth"
- "Sorry, You're Not a Winner" (Note: As part of the Quickfire Round medley)
- "Adieu" (Note: Piano version)

Common Dreads

- "Solidarity"
- "Juggernauts"
- "Zzzonked" (Note: As part of the Quickfire Round medley)
- "Antwerpen" (Note: As part of the Quickfire Round medley)
- "The Jester" (Note: As part of the Quickfire Round medley)

A Flash Flood of Colour

- "...Meltdown" (Note: As part of the Quickfire Round medley)
- "Sssnakepit" (Note: Hamilton Remix as part of the Quickfire Round medley)
- "Arguing with Thermometers"
- "Stalemate" (Note: Rou solo performance)
- "Gandhi Mate, Gandhi" (Note: Intro only)
- "Constellations"

Rat Race EP

- "Rat Race"
- "Radiate"

The Mindsweep

- "Anaesthetist"
- "The Last Garrison
- "Torn Apart"
- "Interlude"

Live Slow, Die Old EP

- "Redshift
- "Hoodwinker"

The Spark

- "The Spark"
- "The Sights"
- "Live Outside"
- "Take My Country Back"
- "Airfield"
- "Rabble Rouser"
- "Undercover Agents"
- "The Embers"

Covers

- "Insomnia" by Faithless
- "Heroes" by David Bowie (Note: Rou solo)
- "All You Need Is Love by The Beatles (Note: Rou solo)
- "Cars" by Gary Numan (Note: Rou solo)
- "Song 2" by Blur

== Setlist ==
Taken from the band's Alexandra Palace show

1. The Spark (from The Spark, 2017)
2. The Sights (from The Spark, 2017)
3. Solidarity (from Common Dreads, 2009)
4. Anything Can Happen in the Next Half Hour (from Take to the Skies, 2007)
5. Take My Country Back (from The Spark, 2017)
6. The Last Garrison (from The Mindsweep, 2015)
7. Radiate (from Rat Race EP, 2013)
8. Undercover Agents (from The Spark, 2017)
9. Arguing with Thermometers (from A Flash Flood of Colour, 2012)
10. Rabble Rouser (from The Spark, 2017)
11. Airfield (from The Spark, 2017)
12. Adieu (from Take to the Skies, 2007)
13. Anaesthetist (from The Mindsweep, 2015)
14. Quickfire Medley (Sorry You're Not a Winner, Sssnakepit (Hamilton Remix), ...Meltdown, Antwerpen)
15. Zzzonked (from Common Dreads, 2009)

Encore

16. "Redshift
17. "Live Outside (from The Spark, 2017)

== Tour dates ==
List of concerts, showing date, city, country, venue and opening acts
Date	City	Country	Venue	Opening acts
In store shows
22 September 2017	London	United Kingdom	HMV Oxford Street	—N/a
23 September 2017	Kingston upon Thames	United Kingdom	Rose Theatre	—N/a
30 September 2017	New York City	United States	Rough Trade NYC	—N/a
Leg 1 – Europe
16 November 2017	Liverpool	United Kingdom	Liverpool Olympia	Lower Than Atlantis; Astroid Boys
17 November 2017	Cardiff	United Kingdom	Motorpoint Arena Cardiff	Lower Than Atlantis; Astroid Boys
18 November 2017	Nottingham	United Kingdom	Motorpoint Arena Nottingham	Lower Than Atlantis; Astroid Boys
19 November 2017	Newcastle	United Kingdom	Metro Radio Arena	Lower Than Atlantis; Astroid Boys
21 November 2017	Manchester	United Kingdom	Victoria Warehouse	Lower Than Atlantis; Astroid Boys
22 November 2017	Brighton	United Kingdom	Brighton Centre	Lower Than Atlantis; Astroid Boys
24 November 2017	Birmingham	United Kingdom	Barclaycard Arena	Lower Than Atlantis; Astroid Boys
25 November 2017	London	United Kingdom	Alexandra Palace	Lower Than Atlantis; Astroid Boys
29 November 2017	Amsterdam	Netherlands	Paradiso	Lower Than Atlantis; Astroid Boys
1 December 2017	Luxembourg	Luxembourg City	Den Atelier	Lower Than Atlantis; Astroid Boys
2 December 2017	Paris	France	Elysee Montmartre	Lower Than Atlantis; Astroid Boys
3 December 2017	Cologne	Germany	Palladium	Lower Than Atlantis; Astroid Boys
5 December 2017	Hamburg	Germany	Mehr! Theater	Lower Than Atlantis; Astroid Boys
6 December 2017	Copenhagen	Denmark	Amager Bio	Lower Than Atlantis; Astroid Boys
7 December 2017	Berlin	Germany	Huxleys	Lower Than Atlantis; Astroid Boys
8 December 2017	Warsaw	Poland	Proxima	Lower Than Atlantis; Astroid Boys
9 December 2017	Prague	Czech Republic	Archa	Lower Than Atlantis; Astroid Boys
9 December 2017	Vienna	Austria	Arena	Lower Than Atlantis; Astroid Boys
9 December 2017	Munich	Germany	Tonhalle	Lower Than Atlantis; Astroid Boys
9 December 2017	Fontaneto d'Agogna	Italy	Phenomenon	Lower Than Atlantis; Astroid Boys
Leg 2 – North America
19 January 2018	Austin	United States	The Mohawk	Milk Teeth; Single Mothers
20 January 2018	Dallas	United States	Tree's	Milk Teeth; Single Mothers
22 January 2018	Orlando	United States	The Social	Milk Teeth; Single Mothers
23 January 2018	Fort Lauderdale	United States	Culture Room	Milk Teeth; Single Mothers
25 January 2018	Atlanta	United States	Terminal West	Milk Teeth; Single Mothers
26 January 2018	Raleigh	United States	Cat's Cradle	Milk Teeth; Single Mothers
27 January 2018	Richmond	United States	Capital Ale House	Milk Teeth; Single Mothers
28 January 2018	Washington, D.C.	United States	9:30 Club	Milk Teeth; Single Mothers
30 January 2018	Boston	United States	The Sinclair	Milk Teeth; Single Mothers
2 February 2018	New York City	United States	Music Hall of Williamsburg	Milk Teeth; Single Mothers
3 February 2018	Philadelphia	United States	Union Transfer	Milk Teeth; Single Mothers
5 February 2018	Montreal	Canada	Théâtre Fairmount	Milk Teeth; Single Mothers
6 February 2018	Toronto	Canada	Lee's Palace	Milk Teeth; Single Mothers
8 February 2018	Columbus	United States	A&R Music Hall	Milk Teeth; Single Mothers
9 February 2018	Chicago	United States	Metro Chicago	Milk Teeth; Single Mothers
10 February 2018	Saint Paul	United States	Amsterdam Hall	Milk Teeth; Single Mothers
11 February 2018	Winnipeg	Canada	The Pyramid Cabaret	Milk Teeth; Single Mothers
13 February 2018	Calgary	Canada	Commonwealth	Milk Teeth; Single Mothers
14 February 2018	Edmonton	Canada	Starlite Ballroom	Milk Teeth; Single Mothers
14 February 2018	Vancouver	Canada	Imperial	Milk Teeth; Single Mothers
17 February 2018	Seattle	United States	Neumo's	Milk Teeth; Single Mothers
18 February 2018	Portland	United States	Hawthorne Theatre	Milk Teeth; Single Mothers
20 February 2018	Santa Cruz	United States	Catalyst Atrium	Milk Teeth; Single Mothers
23 February 2018	Los Angeles	United States	El Rey Theatre	Milk Teeth; Single Mothers
23 February 2018	Santa Ana	United States	The Observatory	Milk Teeth; Single Mothers
25 February 2018	San Diego	United States	The Irenic	Milk Teeth; Single Mothers
27 February 2018	Phoenix	United States	Crescent Ballroom	Milk Teeth; Single Mothers
Supporting Crossfaith
14 April 2018	Kawasaki	Japan	Club Citta	—
15 April 2018	Nagoya	Japan	Diamond Hall	—
17 April 2018	Osaka	Japan	Namba Hatch	—
19 April 2018	Fukuoka	Japan	Drum Logos	—
21 April 2018	Tokyo	Japan	Studio Coast	—
Leg 3 – Asia
24 April 2018	Kowloon	Hong Kong	This Town Needs	Villes
25 March 2018	Bangkok	Thailand	The Rock Pub	—
26 March 2018	Singapore	—	The Substation	Boxchild
28 March 2018 (Note: The concert on 28 March 2018 at Liho Park is part of Heartown Festival.)	Taichung	Taiwan	Liho Park	—
30 March 2018	Guangzhou	China	SD Livehouse	—
Leg 4 – Europe
1 June 2018	Nürburgring	Germany	Rock am Ring	—
2 June 2018	Zeppelinfeld	Germany	Rock im Park	—
17 June 2018	Burgenland	Austria	Nova Rock Festival	—
19 June 2018	London	United Kingdom	The Hope and Anchor	—
22 June 2018	Sofia	Bulgaria	Hippielandia	—
23 June 2018	Kragujevac	Serbia	Arsenal Fest	—
29 June 2018	Ysselsteyn	Netherlands	Jera On Air	—
30 June 2018	Munster	Germany	Vainstream Rockfest	—
4 July 2018	Hradec Králové	Czech Republic	Rock for People	—
8 July 2018	Kyiv	Ukraine	Atlas Weekend	—
13 July 2018	Hatfield	United Kingdom	The Forum Hertfordshire	Eskimo Club; Boston Manor
14 July 2018	Gloucestershire	United Kingdom	Two Thousand Trees Festival	-
28 July 2018	Székesfehérvár	Hungary	Fezen	—
10 August 2018	Southampton	United Kingdom	The Joiners Arms	Haggard Cat
11 August 2018	Winchester	United Kingdom	Boomtown	-
26 September 2018	Brighton	United Kingdom	Concorde 2	Kamikaze Girls
