= The Zone (Enter Shikari album) =

Compilation album by Enter Shikari
- Released: 12 November 2007
- Genre: Hardcore punk; trance
- Length: 40:25
- Label: Ambush Reality
- Producer: Miti Adhikari

Enter Shikari chronology
Take to the Skies (2007)	The Zone (2007)	Common Dreads (2009)

Professional ratings
Review scores
Source	Rating
NME	3/5 stars
Kerrang!	4/5 stars

The Zone is the first compilation album by the English rock band Enter Shikari. It was announced on 1 October 2007 by one of the members of Ambush Reality and was released on 12 November 2007. The compilation features b-sides, demos and a remix by Rou's side-project, Routron 5000. The first few released have 2 hidden tracks, these were put on by mistake. Three tracks are from the BBC Radio 1 Zane Lowe Session performance.

There is also a limited run of The Zone with only four tracks on it.

== Track listing ==
All tracks are written by Enter Shikari.

No.	Title	Length
1.	"The Feast" (demo)	2:52
2.	"Kickin' Back on the Surface of Your Cheek"	3:37
3.	"Keep It on Ice"	2:53
4.	"Adieu" (Routron 5000 remix)	7:22
5.	"Sorry, You're Not a Winner" (Zane Lowe BBC session)	4:23
6.	"Mothership" (demo version)	4:49
7.	"Acid Nation"	3:12
8.	"Enter Shikari" (demo version)	2:57
Total length:		32:45

Hidden tracks
No.	Title	Length
9.	"Return to Energiser" (Zane Lowe BBC session)	5:24
10.	"Keep It on Ice" (Zane Lowe BBC session)	2:56
Total length:		40:25

- Track 1 is from the Sorry You're Not a Winner/OK Time for Plan B single.
- Track 2 was featured on the Kerrang! Awards 2007 CD
- Tracks 2 and 3 are b-sides from the Anything Can Happen in the Next Half Hour single.
- Track 6 is the original download-only version.
- Track 5 (live version) and 7 (b-side) are from the Jonny Sniper single.
- Track 8 is the original free download version released through the Enter Shikari website in 2006, prior to Mothership.
- Track 9 and 10 (Hidden Tracks) are live versions recorded at the same session as track 5.

Some downloaded copies featured the following tracklist:

- The Feast (Demo Version) : 2:54
- Kickin' Back on the Surface of Your Cheek : 3:39
- Keep it On Ice : 2:55
- Adieu (Routron 5000 Remix) : 7:24
- Sorry You're Not A Winner (Zane Lowe BBC Session) : 4:25
- Mothership (2006 Download Festival Version) : 4:51
- Acid Nation : 3:14
- Enter Shikari (Demo Version) : 2:54
- Labyrinth : 3:58
