= Andy Gray (musician) =

British songwriter, composer, and record producer

- Also known as: Amoeba Assassin; Grayed Out
- Born: Andrew Gray-Ling; 1970 (age 55–56)
- Origin: United Kingdom
- Occupations: Producer; mixer; remixer
- Years active: 2000–present
- Website: andygrayproductions.com

Andrew Gray-Ling (born 1970), better known as Andy Gray, is a British songwriter, composer, and record producer. Gray became one half of the Perfecto remix team with Paul Oakenfold to replace Steve Osborne, and they went on to remix Moby's "Natural Blues" and U2's "Beautiful Day" and compose the theme music for Big Brother UK under the name Elementfour.

== Discography ==
=== Film scores ===
- No Way Up (composer)
- Count Me In (2021 documentary/musical) (composer)
- Hunters (composer/ producer)
- Alleycats (composer)
- Mr. Holmes (composer / producer) trailer
- Last Waltz (composer)
- Rapid Intervention (composer)
- TT3D: Closer to the Edge (composer/ producer)
- CSI Miami (composer) original song
- Saab (composer / producer) Saab North America
- The Secret of War (BBC) (composer / producer) UK TV end credits
- Traveler (composer / producer) US pilot TV show
- Ultraviolet (composer / producer) trailer
- I Am Number Four (Disney) (composer / producer) trailer
- Let Me In (composer / producer) trailer
- Toshiba (composer / producer) commercial (Hello Tosh)
- Victims (composer / producer)
- Big Brother (Channel 4 TV UK) (composer / producer) original theme
- Timecop 2: The Berlin Decision (composer / producer)
- Hollywood Homicide (Sony) (composer / producer) original song
- Riders (Miramax) (composer / producer)
- Steal (composer / producer)
- Zoolander (Paramount) (remixer) Song ("Relax")
- The Bourne Identity (composer) Mini Chase
- Stormbreaker – Sync (ready steady Go)
- Collateral -Sync (ready steady Go)
- Swordfish (composer / producer) End Theme
- Get Carter (Warner Bros.) (composer / producer) original track
- Oakenfold & Gray (composer / producer) Toyota commercial ("Gorilla")
- K2 (programmer) Hans Zimmer score

=== Music ===
- Andy Gray /Gary Numan For You (Co-write)
- Tenek-Grayedout What Kind Of Friend
- Viv Ablertine The Vermilion Border (Mix/Add Production)
- Proxies TBC (Record/Mix/Production)
- John Foxx-Grayedout (remix/co-write) Interplay
- John Foxx-Grayedout (remix/co-write) Watching a Building on Fire
- BT (remixer) Emergency
- Kovak (producer) 2nd album (end 2011)
- Hard-Fi (producer) Killer Sounds
- Lonsdale Boys Club (producer) Weekend /Light me up
- Enter Shikari (producer/mix) Common Dreads
- Glenn Morrison (remixer) Tokyo
- Radio Head (remixer) Nude
- Enter Shikari (remixer) "We Can Breathe in Space, They Just Don't Want Us to Escape"
- Kovak (producer) Heroes & High Heels
- Carman Rizzo (remixer) Sirens
- Enter Shikari (remixer) "Anything Can Happen in the Next Half Hour"
- Carman Rizzo (remixer) Traveler in time
- Nizyaz (remixer) Nizyaz
- Tears for Fears (remixer) Mad World
- U2 (remixer) "Beautiful Day"
- Moby (remixer and programmer) "Natural Blues"
- Madonna (remixer) "What It Feels Like for a Girl”
- Korn (remixer) "Did My Time”
- Moody Blues (remixer) "Nights in White Satin”
- Michael Andrews f/ Gary Jules (remixer) "Mad World”
- Gary Numan (keyboards / programming) Jagged
- Syntax (producer) Strange days
- Syntax (producer/writer) Bliss
- Gary Numan (writer / producer) "Hybrid" album
- Natacha Atlas (writer/producer) Something Dangerous
- Dave Matthews Band (remix) Perfecto mix
- Bunkka (writer / producer) Oakenfold Bunkka
- Fluke (Co-writer / producer) "2 bit Pie" album
- Fluke (producer) "Puppy" album
- Gary Numan (remixer) "A Prayer for the Unborn'"
- Joi (remixer) "Deep Asia Vibes”
- Big Brother (writer / producer) Big Brother Theme single
- Quivver (add Prod & mix) "One Last Time"*
- Mansun (remix programmer) "Disappoint You”
- Genelab (remixer) "Out of My Head”
- Ian Brown (remixer) "Golden Gaze”
- Pet Shop Boys (remixer) "Go West" Euro 2000 album
- Natalie Imbruglia (Co-writer) tracks
- New Order (programmer) "Brutal" ('The Beach' OST)
- Georgio Moroder (remixer) "The Chase”
- Skip Raiders (remixer) "Another Day”
- Tori Amos (programmer) tracks
- Elizabeth Fraser (Co-writer/producer) Underwater
- Happy Mondays (programmer) "Boys Are Back in Town'”
- 21st Century Girls (Co-remixer) "21st Century Girls”
- Republica

(co-prod / mix) "Rush Hour" single
(co-prod / mix) "Speed Ballads”

- Rialto

(co-prod / mix) "5.19" single
(co-prod / mix) "When We're Together'"

- Garbage (prog / mix) "Special" remix
- The Aloof

(prog / mix) "Seeking Pleasure'" album
(remixer) "What I Miss Most”
(edit) "One Night Stand”

- Tori Amos

(programmer) songs on From the Choirgirl Hotel
(remix) "Raspberry Swirl" single
(prog / edit) "Cruel" single

- BT

(prog / edit ) ESCM album
(remix) "Love, Peace & Grease" single
(programmer) "Remember'" single
(prog / mix) "MA" album

- Quivver

(programmer) "Blue Lights" single
(programmer) "Falling" single

- Penguin Cafe Orchestra (remixer) "Telephone And Rubber Band"
- Mulu (remixer) "Filmstar" track
- The Human League (programmer) "Octopus" album
- East 17 (programmer) "Thunder'" single
- Amoeba Assassin (writer / artist / prod) "Roller Coaster”
