= Tout peut arriver =

Tout peur arriver may refer to:

- Tout peut arriver (1969 film), a 1969 French film
- Tout peut arriver (television series)
- Tout peut arriver, a 2022 album by Belgian rapper Roméo Elvis

== See also ==
- Anything Can Happen (disambiguation)
