= A Kiss for the Whole World =

Studio album by Enter Shikari
- Released: 21 April 2023
- Genre: Alternative rock; electronic; pop rock; post-hardcore
- Length: 33:52
- Label: SO Recordings
- Producer: Rou Reynolds

Enter Shikari chronology
Moratorium (Broadcasts from the Interruption) (2021)	A Kiss for the Whole World (2023)	Lose Your Self (2026)

A Kiss for the Whole World is the seventh studio album by the English rock band Enter Shikari, released on 21 April 2023 through SO Recordings. It was preceded by the lead single "(Pls) Set Me on Fire" and debuted at number one on the UK Albums Chart, becoming Enter Shikari's first number-one album.

== Recording ==
The album was recorded "using only solar power in a run-down farmhouse", with vocalist and producer Rou Reynolds describing it as "a collection of songs that represent an explosive reconnection with what Enter Shikari is. The beginning of our second act". Reynolds also stated that he "wanted to make a high energy album of bangers".

== Critical reception ==
Professional ratings
Aggregate scores
Source	Rating
Metacritic	79/100
Review scores
Source	Rating
Clash	8/10
Kerrang!	4/5
The Line of Best Fit	8/10
NME	4/5 stars
The Skinny	4/5 stars
Sputnikmusic	2.9/5

A Kiss for the Whole World received a score of 79 out of 100 on review aggregator Metacritic based on six critics' reviews, indicating "generally favorable" reception. Emma Wilkes of NME wrote: "Here, on their seventh album and two decades down the line, Enter Shikari sound perhaps the most joyful they've ever been, and even when they become characteristically philosophical, it still comes from a place of positivity." Wilkes concluded that the record positions "joy as an act of resistance". Dylan Tuck of The Skinny noted it "marks a resurgent and rampant follow-up to the similarly chameleonic soundscape" of the band's previous album, 2020's Nothing Is True & Everything Is Possible, and one can "genuinely feel the life pouring out of the record. It's eccentric, erratic and just the sui generis of what Enter Shikari stand for."

Rishi Shah of Clash described the production as "polished, yet fearless" and the album as "a mission statement of spreading love and optimism, exemplified by some of the most emotive, unified vocals we've heard from Rou to date". Shah concluded that it "carries the intricate soundscapes of The Spark and Nothing Is True... forward". Sam Law of Kerrang! found there to be an "explosive exuberance at the heart" of the album, one that is "fiercely affirmative" and argues there is "still beauty out there on our troubled planet".

Reviewing the album for The Line of Best Fit, Ims Taylor called Enter Shikari "a band who have consistently delivered nothing but fire, politically, socially, sonically, and ambitiously [...] and A Kiss For The Whole World proves it again", opining that they have "reinvent[ed] themselves again, [and] in perhaps the most hopeless times of all, they're seeding their commentary with hope, happiness, and community". A staff writer from Sputnikmusic stated that A Kiss for the Whole World is "eminently-listenable low-calorie fun despite its intermittent slip ups. It is well worth the time of any long-term band-fan, particularly those in need of their, uh, electrosynphonicorepop fix".

== Commercial performance ==
A Kiss for the Whole World debuted atop the UK Albums Chart dated 28 April 2023, becoming Enter Shikari's first number-one album on the chart after five top-10 albums.

== Track listing ==
All lyrics are written by Rou Reynolds; all music is composed by Enter Shikari.

A Kiss for the Whole World track listing
No.	Title	Length
1.	"A Kiss for the Whole World x"	3:31
2.	"(Pls) Set Me on Fire"	3:04
3.	"It Hurts"	3:18
4.	"Leap into the Lightning"	3:04
5.	"Feed Your Soul"	1:18
6.	"Dead Wood"	3:50
7.	"Jailbreak"	3:54
8.	"Bloodshot"	3:24
9.	"Bloodshot (Coda)"	1:17
10.	"Goldfish"	3:20
11.	"Giant Pacific Octopus (I Don't Know You Anymore)"	2:37
12.	"Giant Pacific Octopus Swirling Off into Infinity..."	1:15
Total length:		33:52

iTunes deluxe bonus tracks
No.	Title	Length
13.	"The Void Stares Back" (featuring Wargasm)	3:52
14.	"Bull" (featuring Cody Frost)	3:12
Total length:		40:56

== Personnel ==
Enter Shikari

- Rou Reynolds – vocals, guitar, synthesizer, trumpet, programming, orchestral arrangements, production, mixing
- Rory Clewlow – guitar, backing vocals, engineering, programming
- Chris Batten – bass, synthesiser, vocals
- Rob Rolfe – drums, engineering, programming

Additional musicians

- Mali Clewlow – gang vocals (track 1)
- Jordan Clewlow – gang vocals (track 1)
- Cody Frost – backing vocals (track 3)
- Rick Clark – orchestration
- Paul Campbell – orchestration
- City of Prague Philharmonic Orchestra

Production

- George Perks – engineering
- Dan Lancaster – mixing
- Clint Murphy – mixing
- Prash Mistry – mastering

Additional personnel

- Polygon1993 – cover art
- Stuart Ford – layout

== Charts ==
Chart performance for A Kiss for the Whole World
Chart (2023)	Peak position
Australian Albums (ARIA)	49
German Albums (Offizielle Top 100)	13
Scottish Albums (OCC)	3
UK Albums (OCC)	1
UK Independent Albums (OCC)	1
UK Rock & Metal Albums (OCC)	1
