= Kerrang! Awards 2007 =

British music awards ceremony

- Sponsored by: Kerrang!
- Date: 23 August 2007
- Location: The Brewery, London
- Country: England
- Hosted by: Scott Ian

The Kerrang! Awards 2007 were held in London, England, on 23 August 2007 at The Brewery in Romford and were hosted by Anthrax guitarist Scott Ian.

Kerrang! announced the 2007 nominees on 8 August at the Kerrang! Day of Rock at Virgin Megastores in London. The main categories were dominated by My Chemical Romance and Enter Shikari with four nominations, followed by Fall Out Boy with three. Enter Shikari and Machine Head were the biggest winners of the night, taking home two awards apiece.

== Nominations ==
Winners are in bold text.

=== Best British Newcomer ===
- **Gallows**
- Kids in Glass Houses
- The Ghost of a Thousand
- You Me at Six
- LostAlone

=== Best International Newcomer ===
- Thirty Seconds to Mars
- **Madina Lake**
- Job for a Cowboy
- The Sleeping
- Hellogoodbye

=== Best Live Band ===
- Angels & Airwaves
- Muse
- **Enter Shikari**
- Aiden
- Lostprophets

=== Best Single ===
- **Thirty Seconds to Mars — "The Kill"**
- My Chemical Romance — "Welcome to the Black Parade"
- Funeral for a Friend — "Into Oblivion"
- Enter Shikari — "Sorry You're Not a Winner"
- AFI — "Miss Murder"

=== Best Album ===
- My Chemical Romance — The Black Parade
- **Machine Head — The Blackening**
- Biffy Clyro — Puzzle
- Enter Shikari — Take to the Skies
- Fall Out Boy — Infinity on High

=== Best Video ===
- My Chemical Romance — "Welcome to the Black Parade"
- **Fall Out Boy — "This Ain't a Scene, It's an Arms Race"**
- Hellogoodbye — "Here (In Your Arms)"
- Linkin Park — "What I've Done"
- Paramore — "Misery Business"

=== Best British Band ===
- **Lostprophets**
- Muse
- Enter Shikari
- Biffy Clyro
- Funeral for a Friend

=== Best International Band ===
- **My Chemical Romance**
- Machine Head
- The Used
- Fall Out Boy
- Panic! at the Disco

=== Classic Songwriter ===
- **Deftones**

=== Spirit of Independence ===
- **Enter Shikari**

=== Hard Rock Hero ===
- **Machine Head**

=== Kerrang! Icon ===
- **Nine Inch Nails**

=== Hall of Fame ===
- **Judas Priest**
