= Lose Yourself (disambiguation) =

"Lose Yourself" is a 2002 song by Eminem.

Lose Yourself may also refer to:

- "Lose Yourself" (Entourage), a 2010 episode of Entourage
- "Lose Yourself" (Instant Star), a 2007 episode of Instant Star
- "Lose Yourself", an instrumental by Clint Mansell from Black Swan: Original Motion Picture Soundtrack
- "Lose Yourself" (The Flash), a 2018 episode of The Flash
- Lose Yourself (EP), a 2024 extended play (EP) by Kiss of Life
- "Lose Yourself", a song by the Linda Lindas from No Obligation
- Lose Your Self, a 2026 album by Enter Shikari

== See also ==
- "Lose Yourself to Dance", a 2013 single by Daft Punk featuring Pharrell Williams
