= Anything Can Happen (disambiguation) =

Anything Can Happen is a 1952 comedy-drama film.

Anything Can Happen may also refer to:

- Anything Can Happen (album), by Leon Russell, 1994
- Anything Can Happen, 1945 book by Helen and George Papashvily on which the above film was based
- "Anything Can Happen", a 2019 song by Saint Jhn
- Edhuvum Nadakkum ('Anything Can Happen'), a season of the Tamil TV series Marmadesam

== See also ==
- "Anything Could Happen", a 2012 song by Ellie Goulding
- Anything Might Happen, 1934 British crime film
- Special Effects: Anything Can Happen, a 1996 American documentary film
- "Anything Can Happen on Halloween", a song from the 1986 film The Worst Witch
- Anything Can Happen in the Theatre, a musical revue of works by Maury Yeston
- "The Anything Can Happen Recurrence", an episode of The Big Bang Theory (season 7)
- The Anupam Kher Show - Kucch Bhi Ho Sakta Hai ('The Anupam Kher Show — Anything Can Happen') an Indian TV show
- "Anything Can Happen in the Next Half Hour", or "Anything Can Happen", a 2007 song by Enter Shikari
  - Anything Can Happen in the Next Half Hour (EP), 2004
- Tout peut arriver (disambiguation)
