= Live from Planet Earth =

Live From Planet Earth may refer to:

- Ben Elton Live from Planet Earth, an Australian television series
- Live From Planet Earth (album), a live album produced by UK post hardcore band, Enter Shikari
