= Enter Shikari =

English rock band

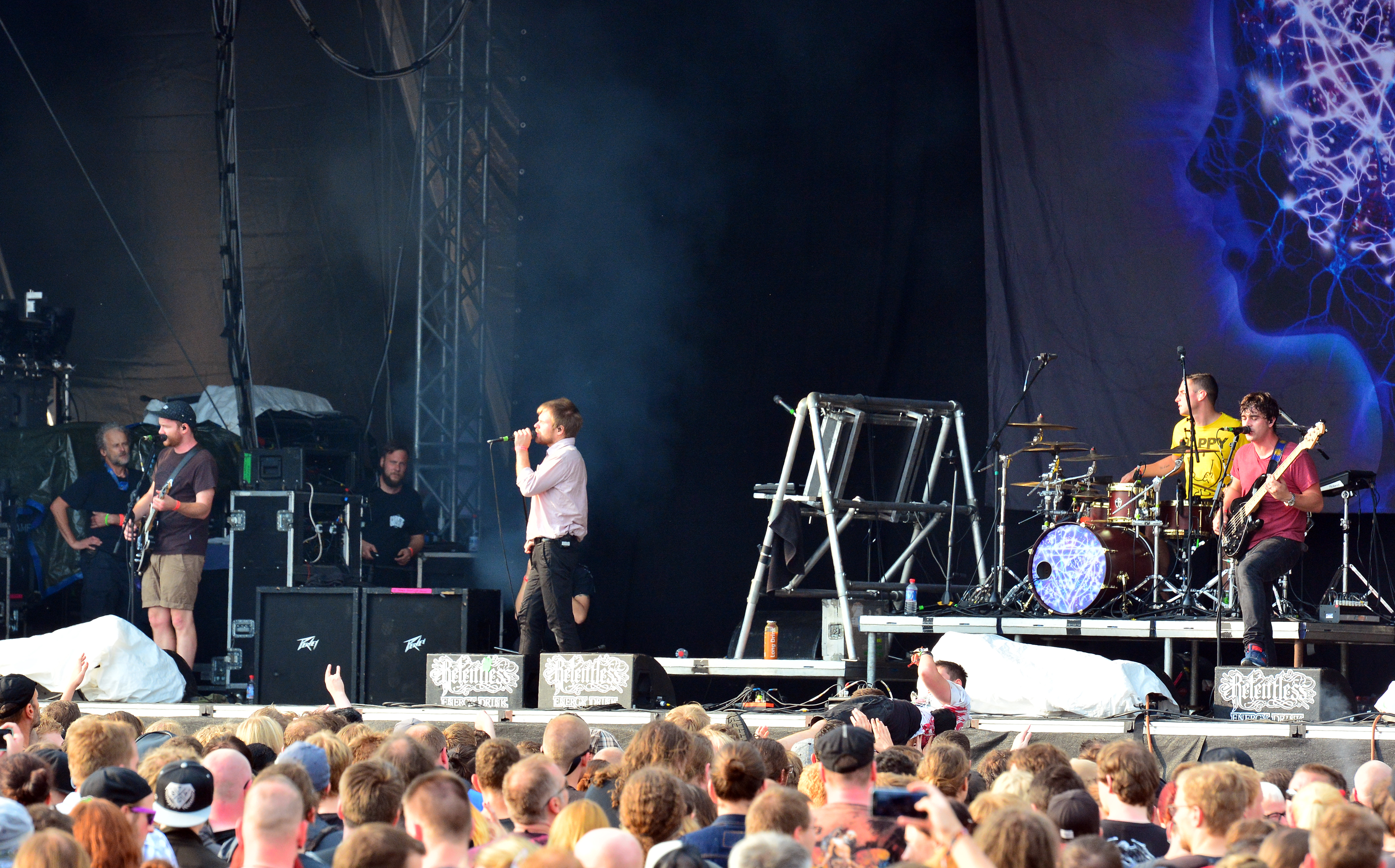
- Enter Shikari performing in 2015. From left to right: Rory Clewlow, Rou Reynolds, Rob Rolfe and Chris Batten.

Background information
- Also known as: Hybryd (1999–2003); Shikari Sound System (DJ alter ego); Jonny and the Snipers
- Origin: St Albans, Hertfordshire, England
- Genres: Alternative rock; electronic rock; post-hardcore; electronicore
- Years active: 1999–present
- Labels: Ambush Reality; PIAS; SO Recordings
- Members: Chris Batten; Rou Reynolds; Rob Rolfe; Rory Clewlow
- Website: entershikari.com

Enter Shikari are an English rock band formed in St Albans, Hertfordshire in 1999 by bassist Chris Batten, lead vocalist and keyboardist Rou Reynolds, and drummer Rob Rolfe. In 2003, guitarist Rory Clewlow joined the band to complete its current line-up, and it adopted its current name.

In 2006, they performed to a growing fanbase at Download Festival as well as a sold-out concert at the London Astoria. Their debut studio album, Take to the Skies, was released on 19 March 2007 and reached number 4 in the Official UK Album Chart, and has since been certified gold in the UK. Their second, Common Dreads, was released on 15 June 2009 and debuted on the UK Albums Chart at number 16; while their third, A Flash Flood of Colour, was released on 16 Jan 2012 and debuted on the chart at number 4. Both have since been certified silver in the UK. The band spent a considerable amount of time supporting the latter release through the A Flash Flood of Colour World Tour, before beginning work on a fourth studio album, The Mindsweep, which was released on 19 Jan 2015. Their fifth studio album The Spark was released on 22 September 2017. Their sixth album Nothing Is True & Everything Is Possible was released on 17 April 2020. Their seventh album, A Kiss for the Whole World, was released on 21 April 2023 and gave the band their first-ever number-one album on the UK charts. Their eighth and most recent album, Lose Your Self, was surprise released on 10 April 2026.

Enter Shikari have their own record label, Ambush Reality, but have also signed distribution deals with several labels to help with worldwide distribution. Their musical style combines influences from rock music and electronic music genres.

== History ==
=== Beginnings (1999–2006) ===
In 1999 a band named Hybryd formed, consisting of Rou Reynolds on guitar and vocals, Chris Batten on bass guitar, and Rob Rolfe on drums. They released an EP called Commit No Nuisance, which featured the tracks "Perfect Pygmalion", "Look Inside", "Torch Song", "Honesty Box" and "Fake". In 2003, with the addition of guitarist Rory Clewlow, Hybryd became Enter Shikari. The band was named after Shikari, a boat belonging to Reynolds' uncle. In a 2011 interview, Rolfe explained that: "Shikari is a Hindi word for hunter." After the band's line-up and name change, Reynolds focused his musical efforts on vocals and electronics instead of guitar.

During 2003 and 2004, the band released three demo EPs (Nodding Acquaintance, Sorry You're Not a Winner and Anything Can Happen in the Next Half Hour) that were available from their gigs and their website, featuring original versions of some songs that were eventually re-recorded for their debut album, Take to the Skies. They would frequently make appearances at their local music venue, The Pioneer Club, where they would play alongside other local bands. They had another demo EP planned for release in 2005 (no such EP materialised, although recordings surfaced online). For this the first versions of "Return To Energiser" and "Labyrinth" were recorded. Early versions of "OK Time for Plan B" and "We Can Breathe in Space" were also recorded around this time but it's unclear if these were destined for the EP. It was at this time that Kerrang! Radio's Alex Baker picked up on the band, and as he didn't have a physical release to play, he streamed "OK Time For Plan B" off the band's Myspace page, straight onto the airwaves.

In August 2006 they released a video of the single "Mothership" which became the single of the week on the iTunes Store. Their first physical single featured re-recorded versions of "Sorry You're Not a Winner/OK Time for Plan B", which had previously been featured on one of the demo EPs. It was released on 30 October 2006. It was limited to 1000 copies of each format and sold out within the first week of release. In mid January 2007, Enter Shikari's first single, "Mothership", entered the UK singles chart for one week at number 151, on Downloads only (despite its physical formats not being eligible for charts [at the band's request]). This was followed a week later by "Sorry You're Not a Winner/OK Time for Plan B", which charted at number 182 on the singles chart (despite its physical formats being ineligible for charts [at the band's request]) and number 146 in the Download Chart. In addition "Sorry You're Not a Winner/OK Time for Plan B" featured on the EA Sports video game titles NHL 08 and Madden 08. Enter Shikari secured a spot on the Gibson/Myspace stage at 2006's Download Festival.

They also had interviews with popular music press such as Kerrang! and Rock Sound. On 4 November 2006, they became only the second unsigned band to ever sell out London Astoria (the first being The Darkness).

They also made the NME's "New Noise 2007", a list of the bands it considers most likely to achieve success in the coming year (previous years lists have included the likes of Arcade Fire, Hot Chip and Bloc Party).

The next single released was "Anything Can Happen in the Next Half Hour", on 5 March 2007. This was the band's second single to be released from their forthcoming debut album. It contained a re-recorded version of the song "Anything Can Happen in the Next Half Hour". It reached 27 in the Official UK chart.

The band released a compilation album titled The Zone just after the debut album, this contained various demo tracks and previously released singles.

=== Take to the Skies (2007–08) ===
The band's debut album, Take to the Skies, was released on 19 March 2007 and on 25 March it reached number 4 in the UK Official Album Charts. It contained re-recordings of many of the songs that had featured on the demo EPs and singles that were released prior to the release of the album.

During the month of March 2007 it was announced they would be playing at Download Festival, Reading and Leeds Festivals, Give it a Name, Glastonbury Festival, Oxegen festival in Ireland and Rock am Ring in Germany. On 30 March 2007, Enter Shikari announced that their next single would be "Jonny Sniper" and would be released on 18 June. The song's video was premiered on 21 May. The single received bad reviews from NME.

Enter Shikari had performed over 500 times by 2007 and played on the Gibson/MySpace stage at 2006's Download Festival. On 14 May 2007, Enter Shikari started their first North America tour. This was followed by three more North American tours.

On 13 May 2008, the band released the first in a series of videos called "Enter Shikari: In the 'Low". The videos, posted on the band's YouTube page, showcased the band as they recorded their new single, "We Can Breathe In Space, They Just Don't Want Us To Escape", and demoed new material. One of the new songs set to feature on the album was "Step Up", which was first performed at Milton Keynes Pitz on 28 June 2008, the warm up show to Projekt Revolution the following day.

=== Common Dreads (2009–2010) ===
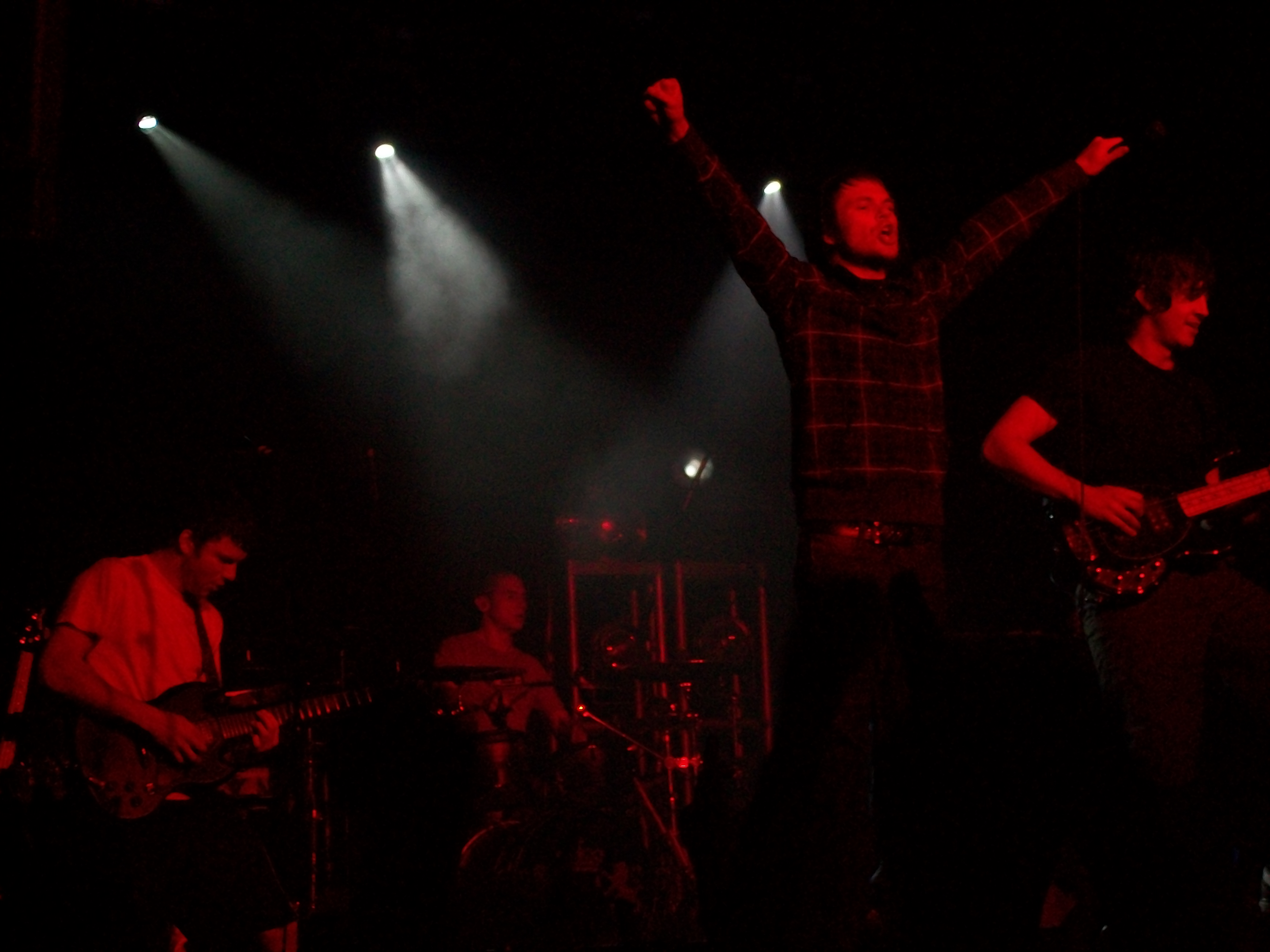
Enter Shikari live at Heaven in London in 2009. From left to right: Clewlow, Rolfe, Reynolds and Batten.

It was confirmed by NME that Enter Shikari had finished working on their second album, Common Dreads, in March 2009 and announced that they would tour the UK and Europe during 2009. They also made available a free download of a new song, "Antwerpen", from their website. On 15 April 2009 "Juggernauts" was played on Radio 1 as Zane Lowe's "Hottest Track in the World" and was released as a single on 1 June 2009 with "All Eyes on the Saint" as its B side. The band also had help from musician Danny Sneddon who helped with the recording of "Juggernauts". On 1 May Kerrang featured their track-by-track of the album. Metal Hammer were the first to review the album online with a track-by-track.

Common Dreads was released through Ambush Reality on 15 June 2009 and debuted at No. 16 on the UK top 40 album chart. The second single to be released from Common Dreads was "No Sleep Tonight". The 7-inch vinyl, CD single and MP3 download was released on 17 August 2009. A slightly modified version of the song "Wall" was released as a radio single, and a video for the song "Zzzonked", made of clips of a live show played at Norwich UEA, was also released.

A 2-disc version of Common Dreads was released in January 2010. Frontman Rou Reynolds announced that "we've got a different artist for each single from Hospital Records to do drum "n" bass remixes so we'll be releasing that as a 12". Then we're doing the same thing with (dubstep label) True Tiger who've done a dubstep remix of each single." However it was later said in a Radio 1 interview that in fact they were only having their main singles remixed.

The single "Thumper" was released on 19 January 2010, on BBC Radio One, as well as the new single "Tribalism", which was first played on Radio 1 on 16 February 2010. These songs come off the new B-sides and remixes album Tribalism, which was released on 22 February 2010.

Throughout February–March 2010, Enter Shikari joined the Australian summer festival Soundwave along with other bands such as A Day to Remember and Architects, playing shows in Brisbane, Sydney, Melbourne, Adelaide and Perth. The band then continued to tour Japan with A Day to Remember and Escape the Fate and in April–May 2010, they served as a support act, along with August Burns Red and Silverstein on A Day to Remember's Toursick.

On 18 and 19 December, Enter Shikari hosted two Christmas Party shows at The Forum in Hatfield, Hertfordshire. Special guest supports included Rolo Tomassi, Young Guns, Dark Stares, Don Broco and The Qemists. The audio from the shows was released via the band's limited edition box-set Live from Planet Earth - Bootleg Series Volume 3.

=== A Flash Flood of Colour (2011–12) ===
On 14 June 2010, Enter Shikari announced that they had returned to the studio to do a "one off new track" called "Destabilise" which was released as a download on 26 October 2010, and a limited edition coloured 7-inch vinyl on 29 November 2010.

In June 2011, the band signed to Hopeless Records in the US, and embarked on the Vans Warped Tour for the second year in a row.

In mid-2011, the band released another one-off single called "Quelle Surprise" before releasing the first single, "Sssnakepit" and "Gandhi Mate, Gandhi" in September and December, respectively, off their third album.

The band released A Flash Flood of Colour on 16 January 2012, and played three album release shows in London, Kingston upon Thames, and Leeds.

At the end of the first week of the album being released, the album reached number four in the U.K charts.

Later that year, the band began their first tour of A Flash Flood of Colour in February by heading out to Tokyo, Japan for one show, before playing Soundwave Festival, including a couple of "sideshows" on their off-days. The band continued their tour across the world, travelling to the United States, South Africa, Europe, Reading and Leeds Festivals, Pukkelpop, FM4 Frequency Festival, Sonisphere in Spain, T in the Park, Rock am Ring and Rock im Park, and many more, ranging from the end of May to the start of September.

In Summer 2012's Kerrang! Awards, the band scooped "Best Live Band" for the second time, along with Rou Reynolds winning 'Hero of the Year.' They were also nominated for best album, but lost out to Mastodon.

In November 2012 the band announced the launch of their own beer "Sssnakepit", a 5% lager brewed in conjunction with Signature Brew, which was launched in Manchester and sold on the "A Flash Flood of Christmas" tour at venues across the UK.

The band were also nominated for Best British Band and Best Live Band at the Kerrang! Awards 2013, but lost out to Bring Me the Horizon and Black Veil Brides respectively.

=== Rat Race EP (2013) ===
In April 2013, the band released a non-album single named "The Paddington Frisk", later announcing that it was part of a then unnamed three track EP due for release later that year (Rat Race EP). On 5 June 2013, the band announced via their official Twitter that they were recording a video for the new single "Radiate", which was first played by Zane Lowe on his Radio 1 show on 10 June. The song was his Single of the Week. 5 months later, "Rat Race" was released, the three tracks were then amalgamated into the Rat Race EP, along with a trance remix of "Radiate" created by Reynolds' side project – Shikari Sound System.

The band headed out on an extensive tour of the UK and Ireland throughout April and May, purposefully playing in towns that don't usually get shows, as a thank you to those fans who usually have to travel to larger cities all the time to see bands. Support for the tour was Hacktivist. This tour was the first time the songs "The Paddington Frisk" was played, as well as "Juggernauts" b-side "All Eyes on the Saint" from 2009

=== The Mindsweep (2014–2016) ===
In late 2012, bassist Chris Batten said that the band would begin working on their fourth studio album after their current touring had finished sometime in 2013. However, Batten also affirmed that the album would not be ready for release in that year.

On 8 October 2014, the band announced that their fourth album would be titled The Mindsweep, and would be released on 19 January 2015. The album was anticipated by singles "The Last Garrison" and "Anaesthetist". In addition, two tracks were also released between November and December 2014: "Never Let Go of the Microscope" and "Slipshod". On 12 January 2015 they put for the streaming on their website the entire new album. In May 2015 they covered System of a Down's Chop Suey! for Rock Sound's compilation Worship and Tributes, while in June they participated at Ultimate Rock Heroes compilation by Kerrang! with a cover of "Know Your Enemy", originally by Rage Against the Machine. On 30 October they released their first remix album, The Mindsweep: Hospitalised, featuring remixes from drum and bass label Hospital Records artists.

On 12 January 2016, a single called "Redshift" premiered on Annie Mac's show on BBC Radio 1. Another new single called "Hoodwinker" premiered on Daniel P. Carter's show on BBC Radio 1 on 9 October 2016.

On 25 August 2016, the band announced a live album for their February 2016 Alexandra Palace show. It was initially due for release on 4 November 2016, however it was delayed until 18 November 2016 due to manufacturing issues.

On 8 November 2016, Enter Shikari were announced as headliners for Slam Dunk Festival 2017.

=== The Spark (2017–2019) ===
On 1 August 2017, Enter Shikari announced their new album The Spark with its lead single "Live Outside". The album was released on 22 September.

To promote the album, the band toured UK, Europe, Japan, and North America on their The Spark World Tour.

On 15 February 2019, the band released a pair of limited edition live albums, Take to the Skies. Live in Moscow. May 2017 and Live at Alexandra Palace 2 both of which were recorded in 2017 on their Take to the Skies 10 Year Anniversary Tour and their The Spark World Tour.

In 2018 the band embarked on an extensive tour of the UK, Europe, and Scandinavia, entitled "Stop the Clocks", during which they performed a new song of the same name. The band released the song as a single on 12 August 2019 shortly before their performances at the 2019 Reading and Leeds Festivals where they played 5 different sets across the weekend. Following this, the band resumed their Stop the Clocks tour with a twelve-date American leg, which singer Rou Reynolds said would "bring the whole "Spark-era" full circle."

=== Nothing Is True and Everything Is Possible (2020–2022) ===
In an interview with Kerrang while the band was in Australia for Good Things Festival, they revealed their next album will be the "most definitive Shikari record to date" and will feature something from every album.

On 10 February 2020, a new single called "The Dreamer's Hotel", stylised as { The Dreamer's Hotel }, premiered on Annie Mac's show on BBC Radio 1. The same day, they announced that their new album would be called Nothing Is True & Everything Is Possible and would release on 17 April 2020. An accompanying music video was released for The Dreamer's Hotel on 5 March 2020, almost a month after the initial release. The video features an unusual use of over-the-top rainbow effects, fitting with the rainbow motif of the album. "The King" was the album's second single, released on 8 March 2020. Frontman Rou described this track as a "lesson in patience and forgiveness" to Kerrang as they have worked on this single song for such a long time. "T.I.N.A." was the third single released on 22 March 2020. The title stands for "there is no alternative". Nothing Is True & Everything Is Possible hit No. 2 on the UK album charts on 30 April 2020, 13 days after its release on 17 April. This was the band's fifth album to reach Top 10 and the third consecutive major album.

On 16 April 2021, they released Moratorium (Broadcasts from the Interruption) without advance notice. It includes songs from their past two albums that have been reworked, re-imagined, recorded live or as acoustic renditions.

On 24 November 2021 through 10 February 2022, Enter Shikari headed out for a brief European tour with a sold-out headline show at Alexandra Palace. On 16 July 2022, the band released their film, Live at Vada, directed by Tom Pullen.

On 17 November 2022, band released a new song named "Bull", recorded in collaboration with Cody Frost. The official music video released the same day.

=== A Kiss for the Whole World (2023–2026) ===
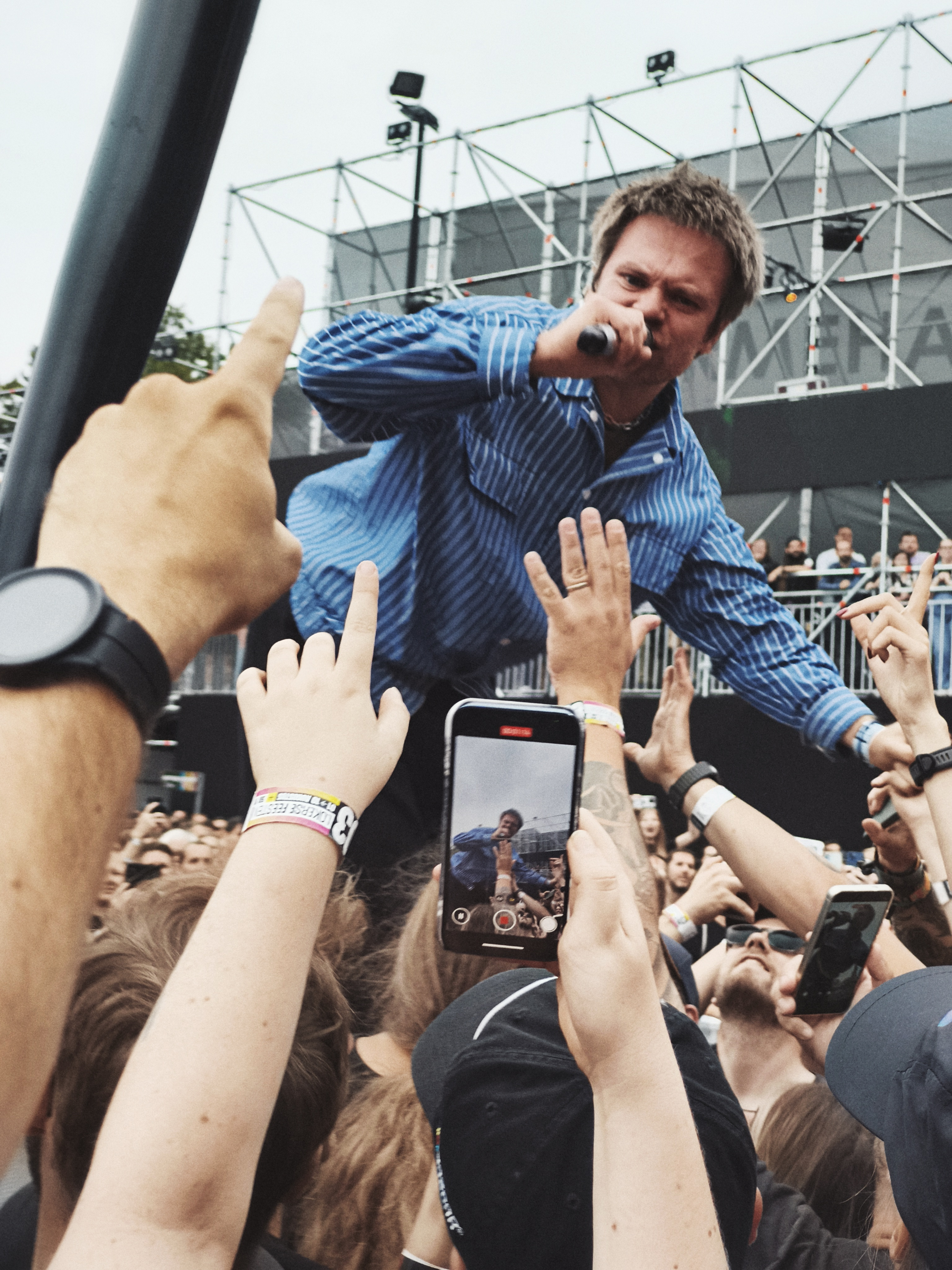
Rou Reynolds performing with Enter Shikari at the Lokerse Feesten 2025.

Simultaneously with the release of the single, "(Pls) Set Me on Fire", the band's seventh album's title was revealed on 12 January 2023 as A Kiss for the Whole World. The album was released on 21 April 2023, and debuted at number one on the UK Albums Chart—their first to do so.

On 26 May 2025, the band announced a Live At Wembley album and an accompanying live film would on July 11, through SO Recordings / Ambush Reality capturing their biggest headline show to date from their 2024 UK arena tour.

=== Lose Your Self (2026–present) ===
On 10 April 2026, Enter Shikari surprise-released their eighth album Lose Your Self on digital streaming services through SO Recordings.

On 1 October 2026, Enter Shikari announced that on 31 December 2027, the band would "fall dormant," citing changes in personal capacity between members as a reason and adding that the dormancy may end with either an eruption back into activity or extinction.

== Musical style, lyrical themes and influences ==
Enter Shikari's musical style has been variously described as alternative rock, electronic rock, post-hardcore, electronicore (which they are considered to have pioneered), experimental rock, post-rock, and on their early releases, metalcore and synth-metal. It is recognisable for combining rock music (especially punk rock and hardcore punk) with elements of various electronic music genres, including drum and bass, dubstep, techno, electronica and trance. It features breakdowns, heavy metal and hardcore-influenced instrumentation, dub-inspired "wobbles", anthemic choruses, drum and bass tempos and an alternation between sung, screamed (or occasionally growled) and rapped vocals, with all members contributing to vocals.

Enter Shikari's lyrics, written by frontman Rou Reynolds, are often politically charged. In a 2015 interview, Kerrang! Magazine wrote: "With Shikari a rare, political voice on the UK rock scene, Rou remains baffled by bands 'labelling themselves as punk that aren't speaking about anything of importance'. 'To us it's second nature,' he says. 'It's what this music is for. If you take out the social commentary, it's not punk, it's just noisy pop.'" At the same time, Reynolds "[doesn't] care if people don't read the lyrics" and only "appreciate Shikari as a noisy pop group". Although not all of the band's lyrics are political, "even when [Enter Shikari write] a love song, [Reynolds wants] to make sure [they] reclaim the love song from all the shit, vapid love songs on the charts." He also stated that the band's general message is that "if we base our lives around love and unity, then that's all that matters."

Political issues that the band have written about in their lyrics include – climate change and the misuse of natural resources, Donald Trump's presidency of the United States, the use of nuclear weapons and the United Kingdom's Trident nuclear programme, the privatisation of the UK's National Health Service, and capitalism.

Enter Shikari's lyrics have also centred around more personal themes throughout their career, such as lead singer Rou Reynolds' anxiety, depression, mental illness, self-pity and the loss of a loved one or idolised celebrity figure. Their album The Spark in particular delves more into personal issues within the band, with Reynolds stating in an interview with The Independent, regarding lyrical themes: "What I was trying to do with this album in marrying the personal and the political is to ensure that human vulnerability is laid bare, and to not be afraid to speak about emotions." He elaborates by stating that "I don't think I could have done it [writing more personal lyrics] before this record. So much happened over those two years [since the release of their previous album], globally and in my personal life, so before. I was kind of comfortable. I have a very finely attuned cringe muscle, I don't like writing about things that have been written about a thousand times. Some of it is maybe even a self-confidence thing, feeling as though I don't have much to offer in terms of art that helps other people. But seeing as 2015 was the year of hell for me, it wasn't just that I wanted to write a more personal record, I had to. There was no way of not doing it".

In an interview following the release of A Flash Flood of Colour, guitarist Rory Clewlow stated that the band's influences are numerous, but include Refused, the Prodigy, At the Drive-In, Sick of It All, Rage Against the Machine, the Beatles, Igor Stravinsky and The Dillinger Escape Plan, and that "most of [their] sound was originally developed through going to see local acts in and around [their] home town."

Rou Reynolds has cited British pop music from the 20th century as being a major influence on his songwriting, particularly on their album The Spark, with The Beatles, The Damned, Joy Division and New Order being key influences on him.

== Ambush Reality ==
Ambush Reality is an independent record label owned by Enter Shikari. Although originally it was exclusively for the release of Enter Shikari's albums and songs, on 21 July 2014 the band announced via Facebook and Twitter they were releasing a song by Nottingham hardcore band Baby Godzilla (now known as Heck). Formed in July 2006, it is co-owned and run by the members of the band and their friends. The band has decided that, to tour in the United States, they had to sign with a major record label in America. On 28 August 2007, Ambush Reality said that Take to the Skies came out in North America in October 2007, with Ambush Reality joining Interscope Records imprint Tiny Evil. Ambush Reality signed a distribution deal with Warner Music to make the album Common Dreads and future releases more accessible outside the UK and also more widely advertised and promoted. As of 8 December 2010 Enter Shikari / Ambush Reality have left distribution through Warner and will distribute throughout UK/Europe/Japan/Australia via PIAS Entertainment Group. As of 21 June 2011, Enter Shikari's releases in North America are via independent record label Hopeless Records.

== Side projects ==
Reynolds has produced music as part of a side project with the name "Rout", which he sometimes performs in small venues and before shows. He previously used the names "Shark & Blitz" and "Routron 5000". The music develops on his penchant for electronics, resulting in a drum and bass/jungle/dubstep sound. Some songs feature samples of Rou and friends fooling around as well as iconic lines from movies or songs. His most recent EP, released for ActionAid, features samples from ActionAid's project work in Ghana.

Rolfe also DJs under the moniker "Sgt. Rolfy", regularly playing slots at the band's aftershow parties. He plays a range of sounds, including trance, drum & bass, dubstep and even classical and parody tunes too.

Clewlow released his first remix, simply as "Rory C", for Don Broco's track "Priorities", from their new record in 2012.

Reynolds has also set up his own clothing company, Step Up Clothing.

On 25 April 2013 the band announced a side project called Shikari Sound System, an alter-ego of the group. The band announced it on their Facebook page straight after they had been announced to play at Reading and Leeds Festival during the summer. Frontman Rou assured fans on his Twitter page that it would be "The same 4 scallywags but playing a live dance set". Shikari Sound System played their debut set at The Reading and Leeds festivals and were joined by members of hardcore band Hacktivist as well as Danny Price who now regularly hosts SSS DJ sets. Shikari Sound System were announced for Slam Dunk Festival on 24 February 2016 and have done regular slots in the UK and Europe.

In 2017, Rou Reynolds released a book named Dear Future Historians, a song-by-song lyrical analysis of the band's work including photos. By popular demand, the book was revisited and expanded in 2019 to include music released since its original publication, and received another strictly limited edition run.

In August 2020, it was announced that Enter Shikari would become the main sponsor of their hometown team, St Albans City Football Club. In 2022, Chris Batten signed on with the football club to play one football match against Dagenham & Redbridge F.C. to raise money to support those affected by the Russian Invasion of Ukraine.

In August 2023, it was announced that Enter Shikari have entered into partnership with The Pioneer Club, the venue where they began performing, and Headliner Group, a music and tech media company, to form Headliner Spaces. Headliner Spaces was set up with the aim to reinstate The Pioneer Club as a touring-circuit grassroots venue and also to have a wider reach into the community. They subsequently auctioned off pieces of Enter Shikari memorabilia such as Reynolds' Kaoss Pad, used most notably on 'Sorry You're Not a Winner' with proceeds going to The Pioneer Club Charity. As part of the partnership, the band also donated £1 from every ticket sold for the 2024 promotional arena tour for their album, A Kiss for the Whole World, to UK-based grassroots venues affected by the economic consequences of the COVID-19 pandemic, the nationwide cost-of-living crisis and gentrification.

== Band members ==
- Rou Reynolds – lead vocals, programming, synthesizer, keyboards, acoustic guitar, rhythm guitar, trumpet, percussion (1999–present)
- Chris Batten – bass, backing vocals, synthesizer, keyboards, percussion (1999–present)
- Rob Rolfe – drums, percussion, backing vocals (1999–present)
- Rory Clewlow – lead guitar, backing vocals, percussion, keyboards, synthesizer (2003–present)
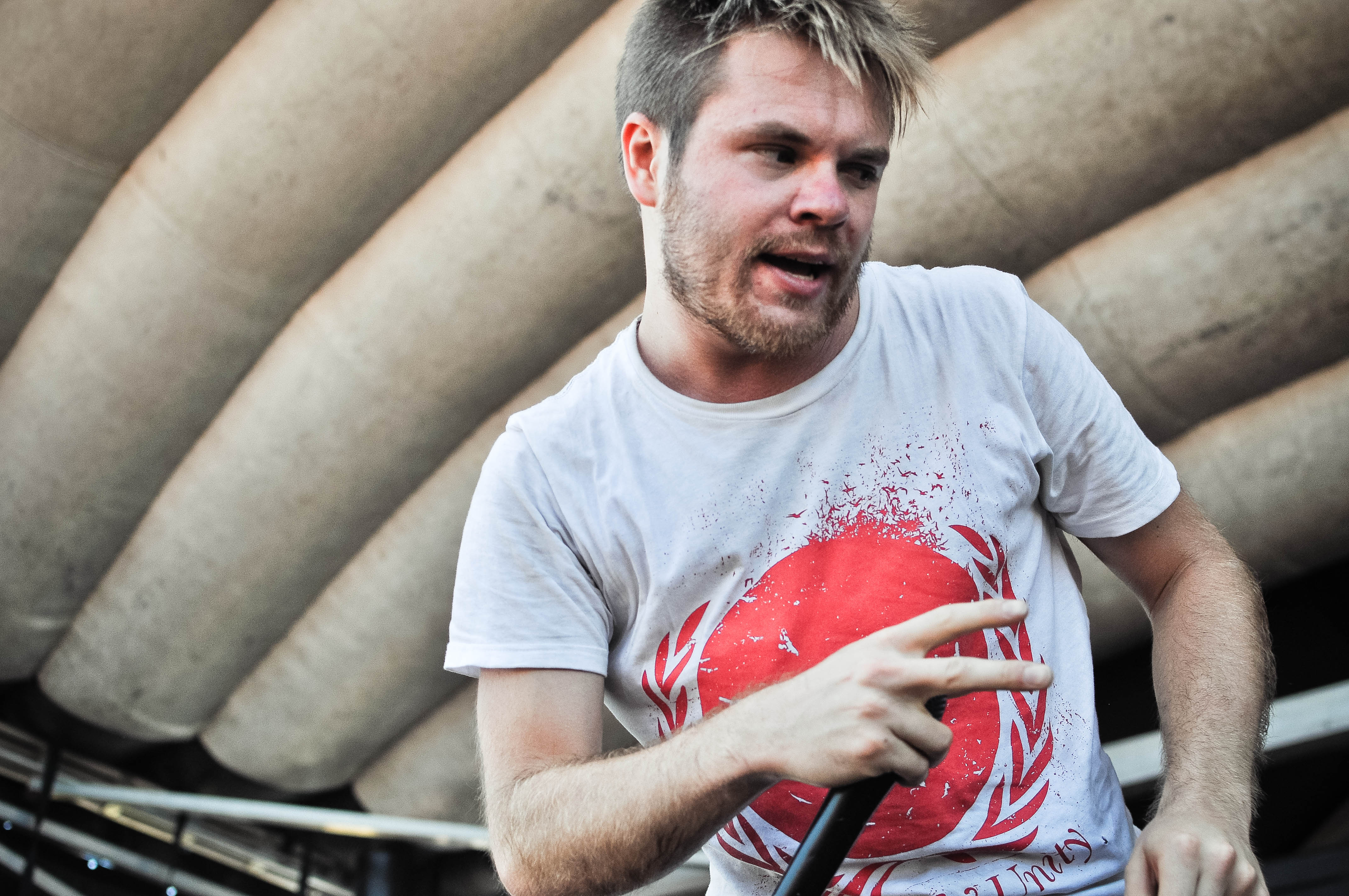
Rou Reynolds

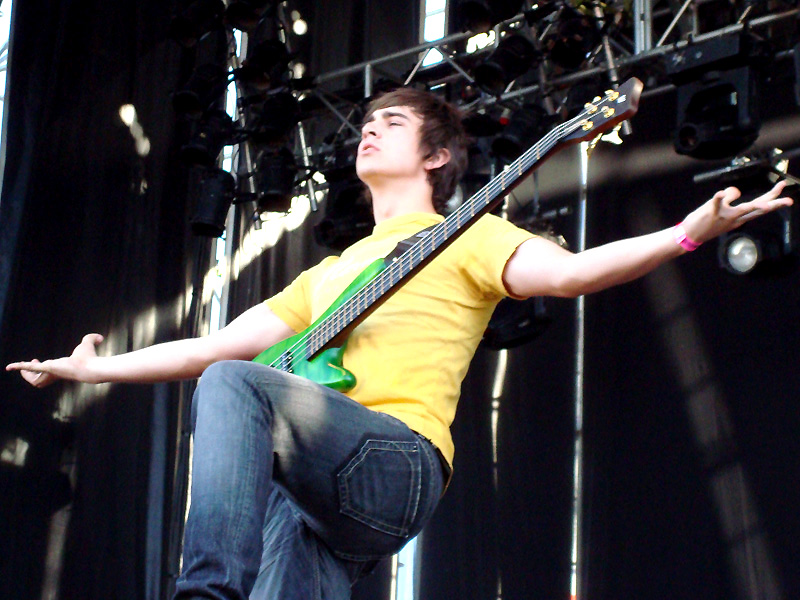
Chris Batten

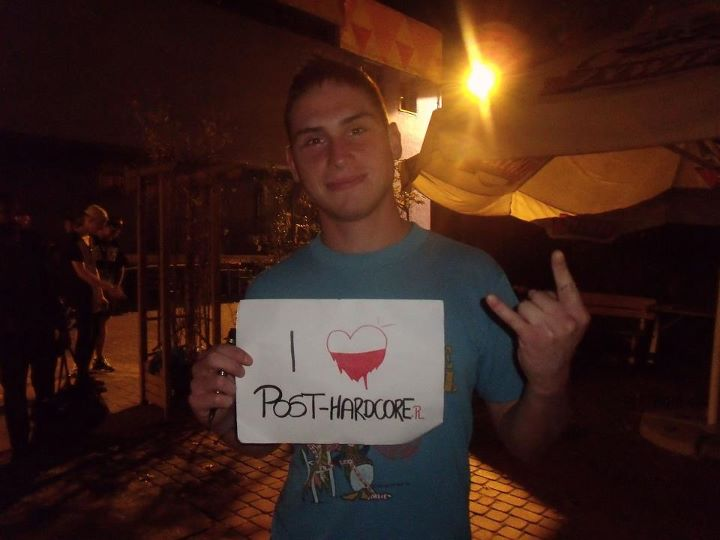
Rob Rolfe

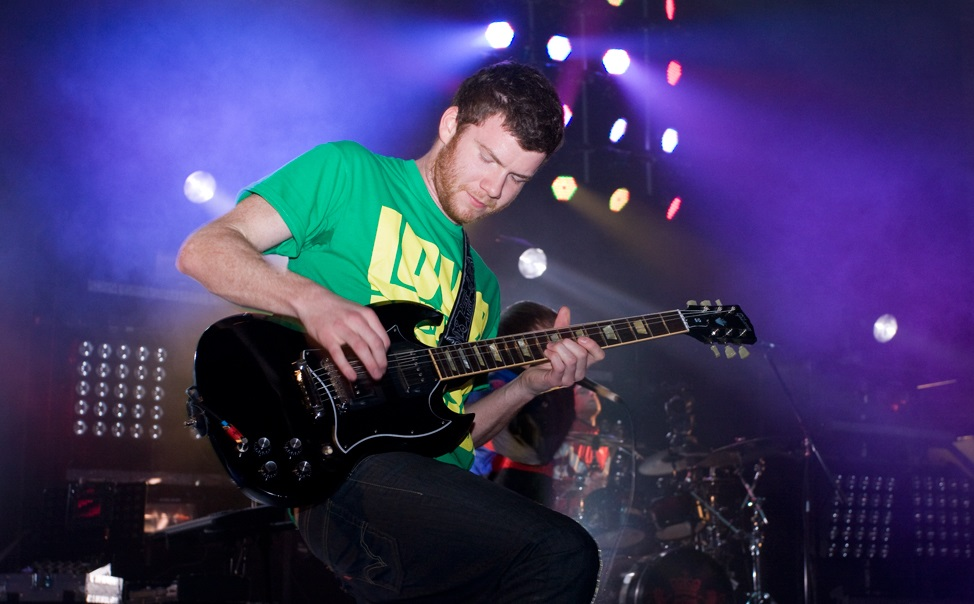
Rory Clewlow

== Discography ==
Studio albums

- Take to the Skies (2007)
- Common Dreads (2009)
- A Flash Flood of Colour (2012)
- The Mindsweep (2015)
- The Spark (2017)
- Nothing Is True & Everything Is Possible (2020)
- A Kiss for the Whole World (2023)
- Lose Your Self (2026)

== Accolades ==
Year	Nominee / work	Award	Result
2006	Enter Shikari	Kerrang! Awards 2006: Best British Newcomer	Nominated
2007	Enter Shikari	NME Awards 2007: John Peel Award for Musical Innovation	Won
2007	Enter Shikari	Kerrang! Awards 2007: Spirit of Independence	Won
2007	Enter Shikari	Kerrang! Awards 2007: Best Live Band	Won
2007	Enter Shikari	Kerrang! Awards 2007: Best British Band	Nominated
2007	"Sorry You're Not a Winner"	Kerrang! Awards 2007: Best Single	Nominated
2007	Take to the Skies	Kerrang! Awards 2007: Best Album	Nominated
2007	Enter Shikari	BT Digital Awards: Breakthrough Artist of the Year	Won
2009	Enter Shikari	Kerrang! Awards 2009: Best Live Band	Nominated
2010	Enter Shikari	Kerrang! Awards 2010: Best British Band	Nominated
2012	Enter Shikari	Kerrang! Awards 2012: Best Live Band	Won
2012	A Flash Flood of Colour	Kerrang! Awards 2012: Best Album	Nominated
2012	Rou Reynolds	Kerrang! Awards 2012: Hero of the Year	Won
2012	Enter Shikari	AIM Awards: Hardest Working Band	Nominated
2012	Enter Shikari	AIM Awards 2012: Best Live Band	Nominated
2012	A Flash Flood of Colour	AIM Awards 2012: Independent Album of the Year	Won
2013	Enter Shikari	AIM Awards 2012: Best Live Band	Won
2013	Enter Shikari	Kerrang! Awards 2013: Best Live Band	Nominated
2013	Enter Shikari	Kerrang! Awards 2013: Best British Band	Nominated
2013	Enter Shikari	NME Awards 2013: Best Fan Community	Nominated
2015	"Anaesthetist"	Kerrang! Awards 2015: Best Single	Won
2015	Enter Shikari	Kerrang! Awards 2015: Best British Band	Nominated
2015	The Mindsweep	AIM Awards 2015: Independent Album of the Year	Won
2016	Enter Shikari	Kerrang! Awards 2016: Best British Band	Nominated
2017	Enter Shikari	Heavy Music Awards 2017: Best Live Band	Won
2018	The Spark	Kerrang! Awards 2018: Best Album	Won

Miscellaneous

- Rock Sound's poll for 'who will make it in 2007'.
- Ourzone Reader's Poll: Best Live Band 2011.
- Ourzone Reader's Poll: Who Will Own 2012.
- NME's User's Poll: Best Act at Reading and Leeds Festivals 2012.
