= Moratorium (Broadcasts from the Interruption) =

Compilation album by Enter Shikari
- Released: 16 April 2021
- Recorded: 2020–2021
- Genre: Alternative rock
- Length: 58:59
- Label: SO Recordings
- Producer: Rou Reynolds

Enter Shikari chronology
Nothing Is True & Everything Is Possible (2020)	Moratorium (Broadcasts from the Interruption) (2021)	A Kiss for the Whole World (2023)

Moratorium (Broadcasts from the Interruption) is the third compilation album by the English rock band Enter Shikari, released on 16 April 2021. Recorded throughout the COVID-19 pandemic, the album consists of remote live and acoustic performances recorded while the band members were separated from one another due to lockdown measures.

== Background and release ==
On 17 April 2020, the band released their sixth studio album Nothing Is True & Everything Is Possible, with the intention of touring it later that year. However, due to the COVID-19 pandemic, tour plans were cancelled due to lockdown measures and ultimately rescheduled to take place at the end of 2021. Under lockdown, the band began trying to work out different ways of performing while they were all locked down away from each other, with lead singer Rou Reynolds stating that "with no live shows, and no real contact with the rest of the band, it was nice to at least be able to do some remote sessions together. It was also interesting to develop acoustic and alternative versions of some of the new tracks. These performances went some way to filling the gaping hole in our lives!"

The album was released on 16 April 2021, accompanied by a book penned by Reynolds titled A Treatise On Possibility: Perspectives On Humanity Hereafter.

== Track listing ==
Moratorium (Broadcasts from the Interruption) track listing
No.	Title	Length
1.	"The Dreamer's Hotel" (acoustic)	3:48
2.	"Rat Race" (at home)	3:25
3.	"Stop the Clocks" (acoustic – at home)	3:42
4.	"Crossing the Rubicon" (at home)	3:18
5.	"Live Outside" (acoustic – at home)	3:21
6.	"Heroes" (acoustic)	4:26
7.	"The Great Unknown" (at home)	3:26
8.	"Satellites" (at home)	3:45
9.	"Stop the Clocks" (at Home)	4:06
10.	"T.I.N.A" (acoustic – at home)	3:46
11.	"Torn Apart" (acoustic – at home)	4:25
12.	"Warm Smiles Do Not Make You Welcome Here" (at home)	4:23
13.	"Live Outside" (solo electric – live from the woods)	3:44
14.	"The Pressure's On" (solo electric – live from the woods)	3:30
15.	"Anaesthetist" (at home)	2:53
16.	"The Dreamer's Hotel" (at home)	2:54
Total length:		59:58

Tracks 5 and 11 are exclusive to the digital edition, and are missing from physical releases (CD and vinyl).

== Personnel ==
Enter Shikari

- Rou Reynolds – vocals, guitar, production
- Rory Clewlow – guitar, backing vocals
- Chris Batten – bass, synthesizer, vocals
- Rob Rolfe – drums, backing vocals

Additional musicians

- Sofia Session Orchestra

== Charts ==
Chart performance for Moratorium (Broadcasts from the Interruption)
Chart (2021)	Peak position
UK Independent Albums (Official Charts)	5
UK Rock & Metal Albums (Official Charts)	6
