= Nothing Is True & Everything Is Possible =

Studio album by Enter Shikari
- Released: 17 April 2020
- Recorded: 2019–2020
- Studio: Vale Studios (Worcestershire, England); Vada Studios (Warwickshire, England); All Access Dallas (Dallas, Texas); Radiate Studios (London, England); Smecky Music Studios (Prague, Czech Republic)
- Genre: Alternative rock; electronic; art rock
- Length: 43:43
- Label: SO Recordings, Ambush Reality
- Producer: Rou Reynolds

Enter Shikari chronology
The Spark (2017)	Nothing Is True & Everything Is Possible (2020)	Moratorium (Broadcasts from the Interruption) (2021)

Singles from Nothing Is True & Everything Is Possible
- 1. "The Dreamer's Hotel" Released: 10 February 2020; 2. "The King" Released: 8 March 2020; 3. "T.I.N.A" Released: 22 March 2020; 4. "The Great Unknown" Released: 10 April 2020; 5. "Satellites" Released: 16 April 2020

Nothing Is True & Everything Is Possible is the sixth studio album by the English rock band Enter Shikari, released on 17 April 2020 through Ambush Reality and SO Recordings.

== Background and production ==
British rock band Enter Shikari released their fifth studio album The Spark on 22 September 2017, via Ambush Reality and PIAS Recordings. The following year, on 26 November 2018, they released a book titled The Spark – Lyrics & Exegesis of Rou Reynolds, which featured all lyrics from The Spark, as well as essays on the album's tracks provided by frontman Rou Reynolds.

In December 2019, following extensive touring in support of their previous record, The Spark, lead singer Rou Reynolds expressed his desire in an interview with Kerrang! to create the "most definitive Shikari record to date", with Reynolds further elaborating that "[this is] the one that a fan would pass to their mate like, 'You don't know Shikari? This is where you start.'"

Following the album's announcement, Reynolds spoke once again to Kerrang! about the themes and sounds on the album, saying, "Possibility is the central theme of the album, lyrically, but it also is musically, too. We've pushed further and asked ourselves, 'Where can we go? Let's fucking go there!' One track is a symphonic orchestral piece, but then there are other tracks that wouldn't sound out of place on our first album, Take to the Skies. I think one thing about this album that's slightly different is that we set out to make something that encapsulates everything that Shikari have done. This album is more broad, and there's more confidence in the songwriting."

Recording for the album took place throughout 2019 and early 2020, with the band documenting the process via a WhatsApp number that fans could follow to receive studio updates directly. Nothing Is True was produced by Reynolds; "it gave us more attention to detail. There are more hours that have been put into this album than any other – a lot more sweat, toil, and crippling indecision!"

When asked about the meaning of the title, Reynolds stated "The 'Nothing Is True' part is a statement of what it feels like to be alive in 2020, it's hard to grasp the truth. There's so much tribalism, bias and ulterior motives everywhere, and it's becoming increasingly difficult to know where to place your trust. And I love the 'Everything Is Possible' part, because the usual phrase is 'Anything Is Possible'. And that's that empowering, motivational, 'You can do anything; anything is possible!' thing. But 'Everything Is Possible' makes it far more sinister. 'Anything' implies choice, but 'Everything' is more daunting, because it takes the focus away from your choice. That, then, is a much better reflection of where we're at, because possibility, traditionally, is a positive thing. But now possibility has become terrifying. The word 'possibility' is shifting to become much more of a layered, deep and scary concept. The title also mirrored the music, and how we keep pushing ourselves."

Although the songs share many lyrical themes in tune with a 2014 book with the identical title, Nothing Is True and Everything Is Possible, the band has not confirmed this is intentional.

== Release ==
On 7 February 2020, the band began posting images across their social media and website featuring a new aesthetic. On 10 February, the band announced the album and premiered its lead single, "The Dreamer's Hotel", on BBC Radio 1 with Annie Mac along with a string of intimate album release shows across Europe and the UK. These shows were later cancelled due to the then-burgeoning COVID-19 pandemic, prompting the band to announce their winter 2020 European and UK tour early, which was later postponed to June 2021.

On 8 March 2020, the second single "The King" was released. This was followed by the release of "T.I.N.A" and "The Great Unknown" on 22 March and 8 April, respectively. The band premiered the song "Satellites" on BBC Radio 1 on 16 April, the eve of the album's release.

Nothing Is True & Everything Is Possible was released worldwide on 17 April 2020 through SO Recordings.

== Critical reception ==
Professional ratings
Aggregate scores
Source	Rating
Metacritic	80/100
Review scores
Source	Rating
AllMusic	4/5 stars
Clash	4/10
Evening Standard	3/5 stars
Gigwise	8/10 stars
Kerrang!	4/5
NME	4/5 stars
Q	4/5 stars
Sputnikmusic	4.2/5
VultureHound	4.5/5 stars

Nothing Is True & Everything Is Possible has an aggregated score of 80/100 based on "generally favorable reviews" on Metacritic, from 7 reviews.

In a 4 out of 5 star review for NME, Ali Shutler wrote: "Nothing is True & Everything is Possible brings together every shape that Enter Shikari have ever pulled and slots them together to create their most definitive album yet. It's a crash course in their unruly genius and all their best tricks – a Greatest Hits waiting for you to learn the words."

Kerrang! was similarly complimentary towards the album, with reviewer Tom Shepherd stating, "despite the band stretching their boundaries wider than ever before and employing a kitchen-sink approach to experimentation, this is the most Enter Shikari sounding record the band have made to date. That they're able to juggle all of this while making something that captures the uncertain mood and feelings of a generation only serves to show off their genius further."

Clash's Josh Gray was markedly more critical in his 4 out of 10 review of the record, stating that "Enter Shikari really do lose something of themselves on Nothing Is True and Everything Is Possible, an album buried under the boundless ambition of its creators," whilst also conceding that the band "have the tools and drive to create something potentially mind-blowing, it's just that they fell well short of the mark on this occasion."

== Track listing ==
Nothing Is True & Everything Is Possible track listing
No.	Title	Length
1.	"The Great Unknown"	3:25
2.	"Crossing the Rubicon"	3:17
3.	"The Dreamer's Hotel"	2:53
4.	"Waltzing Off the Face of the Earth (I. Crescendo)"	3:26
5.	"Modern Living...."	2:52
6.	"Apocaholics Anonymous (Main Theme in B Minor)"	1:36
7.	"The Pressure's On"	2:58
8.	"Reprise 3"	0:46
9.	"T.I.N.A."	3:05
10.	"Elegy for Extinction"	3:49
11.	"Marionettes (I. The Discovery of Strings)"	2:53
12.	"Marionettes (II. The Ascent)"	3:19
13.	"Satellites"	3:46
14.	"The Kĭng"	2:48
15.	"Waltzing Off the Face of the Earth (II. Piangevole)"	2:50
Total length:		43:43

== Personnel ==
Enter Shikari

- Rou Reynolds – lead vocals, keyboards, programming, piano, orchestral arrangements, production, mixing (tracks 6, 10, 15)
- Rory Clewlow – guitar, vocals, engineering
- Chris Batten – bass guitar, vocals
- Rob Rolfe – drums, percussion, drum engineering

Additional musicians

- George Fenton – orchestral arrangements (track 10)
- Julian Kershaw – orchestral arrangements (track 10)
- City of Prague Philharmonic Orchestra (track 10)
- Lucie Švehlová – concertmaster (track 10)
- Adam Klemens – conductor (track 10)
- Pete Fraser – baritone saxophone, tenor saxophone (track 4)
- Mike Kearsy – tuba (track 4)

Production

- Dan Weller – engineering, production assistant
- George Perks – engineering
- Will Flato – engineering
- Vitek Král – engineering (track 10)
- Michal Hradiský – engineering assistant (track 10)
- Dan Lancaster – mixing (tracks 1, 3, 8–9, 14)
- Geoff Swan – mixing (tracks 5, 7)
- Clint Murphy – mixing (tracks 2, 4, 11–13)
- Rhys May – mixing assistant
- Prash 'Engine-Earz' Mistry – mastering
- Lavar Bullard – mastering
- Stuart Hawkes – mastering (vinyl)

Additional personnel

- Ian Johnsen – art direction
- Stuart Ford – layout
- Tom Pullen – photography
- Corinne Cumming – photography assistant

== Charts ==
Chart performance for Nothing Is True & Everything Is Possible
Chart (2020)	Peak position
Austrian Albums (Ö3 Austria)	64
German Albums (Offizielle Top 100)	35
Scottish Albums (OCC)	2
Swiss Albums (Schweizer Hitparade)	50
UK Albums (OCC)	2
UK Independent Albums (OCC)	2
UK Rock & Metal Albums (OCC)	1
