= Common Dreads =

Studio album by Enter Shikari
- Released: 15 June 2009
- Recorded: Late 2008–February 2009
- Studios: Arreton Manor, UK
- Genres: Electronicore; post-hardcore; alternative rock; drum and bass; trance
- Length: 50:27
- Label: Ambush Reality
- Producers: Enter Shikari; Andy Gray; Dan Weller

Enter Shikari chronology
The Zone (2007)	Common Dreads (2009)	Tribalism (2010)

Singles from Common Dreads
- 1. "Juggernauts" Released: 1 June 2009; 2. "No Sleep Tonight" Released: 17 August 2009

Common Dreads is the second studio album by the English rock band Enter Shikari, released on 15 June 2009 and 16 June in the US. Recording of the album took place in late 2008–2009. The album was produced and mixed by Andy Gray at Arreton Manor. Guitar production was carried out by Dan Weller of SikTh.

== Background and recording ==
In late September 2008, the group uploaded themselves performing "Antwerpen". They said the track would be recorded for the next album, which was planned for release in early 2009. Between late September and early November, the group went a club tour in the UK. Towards the end of the tour, the group released a new track, "We Can Breathe in Space, They Just Don't Want Us to Escape", which had been produced by Andy Gray.

Enter Shikari began work on their second album towards the end of 2008 and started demoing songs in "The 'Low" (episodes released on YouTube by Enter Shikari showing their progress.) The new album was recorded in Arreton Manor situated on the Isle of Wight. Recording finished in late February 2009.

== Composition ==
The album has a political motive behind it and references to the current economic climate is a topic that is covered. The album has a distinct stylistic change to Take to the Skies, most notably, more use of clean vocals and a mixture of more electronic music genres, including drum and bass, electro house and dubstep, as well as the trance and electronic hardcore which was explored on their debut album.

There is a drastic lyrical change in the new album. The band formerly wrote lyrics concerning various different subjects and made frequent use of metaphors. In Common Dreads, the band's lyrical subjects concern socio-political topics, like in "Step Up", a song that critiques free world trade. The song "No Sleep Tonight" speaks about the ecological situation of today. The song "Fanfare for the Conscious Man" contains lyrical connotations to the injustice of the various wars the government were engaging in whilst Enter Shikari were writing the album, the line, "Our gracious queen should grasp her crown, and take a good fucking swing at Blair and Brown" confirms the anti-war views of this song. The band expresses further political ideas in the song "Juggernauts" where the closing line is; "The idea of community will be something displayed in a museum", when coupled with the anti-capitalist and hopeless tone of previous lyrics, can be interpreted as a Pro-Collectivist stance. Rou Reynolds told Kerrang! that the song was inspired by the book Tescopoly by Andrew Simms.

== Release ==
On 25 February 2009, "Antwerpen" was released as a free download. In late March, the group performed at a Kerrang!-hosted event at South by Southwest in the US. In late April, the group performed at Give it a Name festival, followed by an appearance at The Bamboozle festival in the US in early May. On 29 April, a music video was released for "Juggernauts". The track was released as a single on 1 June. On 8 June, the album was made available to stream to the public from the NME website for free. On 12 June, the group performed a secret set at Download Festival. Common Dreads was released on 15 June through Ambush Reality. Shortly after this, the band performed at Glastonbury Festival. In July, the band went on a tour of the US with August Burns Red and Blessthefall. In August 2009, the band performed at Summer Sonic Festival in Japan, FM4 Frequency Festival in Austria and the Reading and Leeds Festivals in the UK. It was announced via the Enter Shikari website that the second single from the album would be "No Sleep Tonight", to be released on 17 August 2009.

In September 2009, the band went on a US tour with the Bled, Asking Alexandria, Broadway. Enter Shikari's song "Wall" premièred on Zane Lowe's show on 29 September 2009, but is not scheduled for release as an official single. In late September, the band posted a video on their YouTube channel of "Antwerpen" filmed live in "The 'Low". This track was to become the first track released, made available as a free download, linked from the band's MySpace page. The next official single was "Zzzonked", with the video being released on Ambush Reality/Enter Shikari's official YouTube Channel on 7 October 2009. This was recorded at Norwich on the first leg of their European tour in 2009, The video can be seen here. In October, the group went on a UK tour. In February 2010, went on a brief UK tour, before performing at Soundwave festival in Australia. In June and July 2010, the band performed on Warped Tour, and then appeared at the Reading and Leeds Festivals.

== Reception ==
Professional ratings
Review scores
Source	Rating
AbsolutePunk	(78%)
AllMusic	3.5/5 stars
Digital Spy	3/5 stars
Entertainment.ie	2.5/5 stars
NME	5/10 stars
The Observer	3/5 stars
Planet Sound	5/10 stars
Rock Sound	9/10 stars
The Times	2/5 stars

Common Dreads has polarised critics. Ultimate-Guitar rated the album with an overall rating of 9.3/10. Similarly, music magazines Kerrang! and Metal Hammer gave very positive reviews, Kerrang! rating the album 5/5. The album also has its critics. Digital Spy gave the album 3/5 calling it 'hit and miss'. Pete Paphides of The Times gave the album 2 stars out of 5, describing it as "a titanically inadvisable mash-up between Gallows and John Craven's Newsround." Similarly, Lauren Murphy of entertainment.ie described it as "an overkill of brawn, insufficient brain."

Common Dreads entered the album charts at number 16 selling 15,000 copies in its first week.

== Track listing ==
All lyrics are written by Roughton "Rou" Reynolds; all music is composed by Enter Shikari.

No.	Title	Length
1.	"Common Dreads"	2:08
2.	"Solidarity"	3:16
3.	"Step Up"	4:40
4.	"Juggernauts"	4:44
5.	"Wall"	4:29
6.	"Zzzonked"	3:27
7.	"Havoc A"	1:40
8.	"No Sleep Tonight"	4:16
9.	"Gap in the Fence"	4:07
10.	"Havoc B"	2:52
11.	"Antwerpen"	3:15
12.	"The Jester"	3:55
13.	"Halcyon"	0:42
14.	"Hectic"	3:17
15.	"Fanfare for the Conscious Man"	3:45
Total length:		50:27

iTunes Bonus Tracks
No.	Title	Length
16.	"Enter Shikari" (Live Track)	4:00
17.	"Labyrinth" (Live Track)	3:29
18.	"Return to Energiser" (Live Track)	5:46
Total length:		1:03:02

Japanese bonus tracks
No.	Title	Length
16.	"We Can Breathe in Space, They Just Don't Want Us to Escape (radio edit)"	4:04
17.	"All Eyes on the Saint"	5:53
Total length:		1:01:34

== Personnel ==
Enter Shikari

- Roughton "Rou" Reynolds – lead vocals, additional guitars, lap steel guitar, keyboards, synthesizers, programming, samples, electronics, trumpet, trombone, bongos, piano, church organ, percussion, lyrics
- Chris Batten – bass, backing vocals, co-lead vocals on "Step Up", "Juggernauts", "No Sleep Tonight" and "Hectic"
- Liam "Rory" Clewlow – lead guitar, rhythm guitar, backing bongos, backing vocals, co-lead vocals on "Juggernauts" and "Wall"
- Rob Rolfe – drums, percussion

Additional personnel

- Andy Gray – additional vocals on "Hectic"
- Dan Weller – additional guitars

Production

- Enter Shikari – production
- Andy Gray – production, recording engineer, mixing engineer
- Dan Weller – production
- Tim Young – mastering

== Chart performance ==
Chart (2009)	Peak position
Australian Albums Chart	55
Belgian Albums Chart	94
German Albums Chart	96
Japan Albums Chart	77
UK Albums Chart	16

== Certifications ==
Region	Certification	Certified units/sales
United Kingdom (BPI)	Gold	100,000^{‡}
^{‡} Sales+streaming figures based on certification alone.
