= We Can Breathe in Space, They Just Don't Want Us to Escape =

Single by Enter Shikari
- Released: 2 November 2008
- Recorded: April–May 2008
- Genre: Electronicore
- Length: 5:54
- Label: Ambush Reality
- Songwriters: Chris Batten, Rou Reynolds, Rob Rolfe, Rory Clewlow
- Producers: Enter Shikari, Andy Gray

Enter Shikari singles chronology
"Jonny Sniper" (2007)	"We Can Breathe in Space, They Just Don't Want Us to Escape" (2008)	"Juggernauts" (2009)

"We Can Breathe in Space, They Just Don't Want Us to Escape" is a song by British rock band Enter Shikari. The release of the single is the only release of Enter Shikari in 2008. The single was not released on the band's album, Common Dreads, in 2009, as it was decided by the band that it would be a "go-between" Take to the Skies and Common Dreads.

The song was originally demoed by the band in 2006. The reason of the re-recording was because of many requests from fans to have this song re-recorded. It is also noted that it became popular amongst fans due to P2P and File sharing sites.

The single was released digitally on 2 November 2008, with the physical formats to be released on 3 November 2008. All physical formats are limited to 1000 copies.

== Music video ==
The music video features the band performing the song wrapped up in tinfoil suits. The video was shot on location in The 'Low, St Albans (the back of Chris Batten's house) and was directed by Alex Smith who also directed the video for "Sorry, You're Not A Winner"

== Track listing ==
CD
No.	Title	Length
1.	"We Can Breathe in Space, They Just Don't Want Us to Escape"	5:54
2.	"Insomnia" (Faithless cover; recorded live at Brixton Academy on the 2007 Autumn tour)	4:33
3.	"We Can Breathe in Space, They Just Don't Want Us to Escape" (Rout Mix)	5:16
4.	"Sorry, You're Not a Winner" (Rout Mix)	5:34

White 7" vinyl

Side A
No.	Title	Length
1.	"We Can Breathe in Space, They Just Don't Want Us to Escape"	5:54

Side B
No.	Title	Length
1.	"Insomnia" (Faithless cover; recorded live at Brixton Academy on the 2007 Autumn tour)	4:33

Clear 7" remix vinyl

Side A
No.	Title	Length
1.	"We Can Breathe in Space, They Just Don't Want Us to Escape" (Rout Mix)	5:16

Side B
No.	Title	Length
1.	"Sorry, You're Not a Winner" (Rout Mix)	5:34

Download/Digital bundle
No.	Title	Length
1.	"We Can Breathe in Space, They Just Don't Want Us to Escape"	5:54
2.	"Insomnia" (Faithless cover; recorded live at Brixton Academy on the 2007 Autumn tour)	4:33
3.	"We Can Breathe in Space, They Just Don't Want Us to Escape" (Rout Mix)	5:16
4.	"Sorry, You're Not a Winner" (Rout Mix)	5:34
5.	"We Can Breathe in Space, They Just Don't Want Us to Escape" (Exclusive Andy Gray Mix)	8:53

== Chart performance ==
Chart (2008)	Peak position
UK Singles Chart	80
UK Indie Chart	3
UK Rock Chart	1

== Personnel ==
- Roughton "Rou" Reynolds - Vocals, Electronics and Steel Guitar
- Liam "Rory" Clewlow - Guitar, Backing Vocals
- Chris Batten - Bass, Vocals
- Rob Rolfe - Drums
