= Jonny Sniper =

Single by Enter Shikari

from the album Take to the Skies
- Released: 17 June 2007
- Recorded: The Outhouse, Reading, UK, 2006 - 2007
- Genre: Pop punk; electronicore
- Length: 4:02
- Label: Ambush Reality
- Songwriters: Chris Batten, Rou Reynolds, Rob Rolfe, Rory Clewlow

Enter Shikari singles chronology
"Anything Can Happen in the Next Half Hour..." (2007)	"Jonny Sniper" (2007)	"We Can Breathe in Space, They Just Don't Want Us to Escape" (2008)

"Jonny Sniper" was the third physical single, and fourth overall, by Enter Shikari and the third single to be released from their debut album Take to the Skies. The band have referred to the single as a "double a-side", possibly due to the positive response to "Kickin' Back on the Surface of Your Cheek", the b-side from the previous single.

== Track listing ==
- CD
1. "Jonny Sniper" - 4:02
2. "Acid Nation" - 3:12
3. "Sorry You’re Not A Winner" (Live From Zane Lowe's BBC Radio 1 Session) - 4:23
- 7" vinyl
1. "Jonny Sniper" - 4:02
2. "Acid Nation" - 3:12
- Digital download (7digital and iTunes)
1. "Jonny Sniper" - 4:02
2. "Acid Nation" - 3:12
3. "Sorry You’re Not A Winner" (Live From Zane Lowe's BBC Radio 1 Session) - 4:23
4. "Jonny Sniper" (Emotiquon Remix) - 7:10
5. "Jonny Sniper" (Ocelot Remix) - 4:41 - iTunes pack only

== Music video ==
The video premiered on MTV2 Europe (now MTV Two) on Monday, May 21, 2007. It shows the band going up from a platform to pick up their instruments and play. The video also features special effects throughout the video. At the end, the band's old tour van, dubbed by fans as "The Shikari Ferrari", is blown up by pyrotechnics.

== Meaning ==
"Jonny Sniper" is described by Rou in the March 10th issue of Kerrang! saying this of the song "It's about people having no respect for the earth. The lyrics are about the earth crying out, telling us to behave". This is similar to the description given for the song "No Sssweat" by the band at live shows. They were present in other areas as well when a demo version of the track, less produced, with different lyrics and a slightly different structure, was featured on Enter Shikari's third demo EP 'Anything Can Happen In The Next Half Hour'. The band has claimed that "Johnny Sniper" is the name of the comic figure that appeared in their Key Stage 3 sex education lessons. Furthermore, during many gigs on their 2007 tour, promotional Jonny Sniper condoms were handed out.

== Reception ==
The B-side "Acid Nation" was first aired on BBC Radio 1 on Wednesday, May 30, 2007, at 8:07 PM. The song was available free on iTunes as part of the "Free Single Saturday" campaign. The popular music magazine NME dubbed the single "The worst single ever made by anybody ever", which Chris Batten mocked during the secret BBC Radio Theatre gig, and again by using the quote to introduce the song at the Download Festival 2007.

== Chart performance ==
Chart (2007)	Peak position
UK Singles Chart	75
UK Indie Chart	3
UK Rock Chart	2

== Personnel ==
Enter Shikari

- Roughton "Rou" Reynolds - vocals, piano, electronics
- Chris Batten - bass, backing vocals
- Liam "Rory" Clewlow - guitar, backing vocals
- Rob Rolfe - drums

Production

- Enter Shikari - producer
- John Mitchell - recording
- Ben Humphreys - recording
- Martin Giles - mastering
- Keaton Henson - illustration, design
