= The Spark (album) =

Studio album by Enter Shikari
- Released: 22 September 2017
- Studio: Angelio Studios; Muttley Ranch; Radiate Studios
- Genre: Alternative rock; electronic rock
- Length: 40:36
- Label: Ambush Reality; PIAS Recordings
- Producer: David Kosten, Rou Reynolds

Enter Shikari chronology
The Mindsweep: Hospitalised (2015)	The Spark (2017)	Nothing Is True & Everything Is Possible (2020)

Singles from The Spark
- 1. "Live Outside" Released: 31 July 2017; 2. "Rabble Rouser" Released: 13 September 2017; 3. "The Sights" Released: 15 December 2017

The Spark is the fifth studio album by the English rock band Enter Shikari, released on 22 September 2017 through Ambush Reality and PIAS Recordings. It was recorded in Northamptonshire in early 2017.

== Background and production ==
Following world events in 2016, including Brexit and the election of Donald Trump, leadman Rou Reynolds announced on Twitter that he had been suffering from general anxiety disorder. He declared his frustration and newfound inspiration to write what he intended to be the band's most important work.

Recording for The Spark took place at Angelio Studios and Muttley Ranch in England with David Kosten and Reynolds acting as producers. Sessions were recorded by Kosten and Tim Morris. Additional recording was done by Reynolds at Radiate Studios with assistance from Luke Gibbs. Koston provided additional keyboards and programming to the tracks. In addition, Will Harvey and Augusta Harris contributed violin and cello, respectively. Koston mixed the album, which was mastered for CD and digital download by Bob Ludwig at Gateway Mastering and for vinyl by Stuart Hawken at Metropolis.

== Release ==
On 31 July 2017, the band released a music video for the first single "Live Outside". On 13 September 2017, the second single and the music video for "Rabble Rouser" was released. The album was released on 22 September 2017 through Ambush Reality and PIAS Recordings. In November and December 2017, the band will support the release of the album with an arena tour of the UK and mainland Europe.

== Critical reception ==
Professional ratings
Aggregate scores
Source	Rating
Metacritic	74/100
Review scores
Source	Rating
AllMusic	3.5/5 stars
Alternative Press	4/5 stars
Drowned In Sound	8/10
The Guardian	3/5 stars
The Independent	4/5 stars
Kerrang!	4/5 stars
NME	4/5 stars
Sputnikmusic	3.8/5 stars

The Spark was met with positive reviews from critics. Metacritic gave the album an aggregated score of 74/100, indicating "generally favorable reviews", based on 10 reviews.

Francesca Gosling writing for The Irish Times gave The Spark a positive score of 8/10, summarising that "Those hoping for a return to the earlier sound may be disappointed, but Enter Shikari's unflinching desire to evolve with every release is something very exciting indeed."

The Spark won the Best Album award at the 2018 Kerrang! Awards.

== Track listing ==
All lyrics by Rou Reynolds. All music by Enter Shikari.

No.	Title	Length
1.	"The Spark"	0:47
2.	"The Sights"	3:18
3.	"Live Outside"	3:37
4.	"Take My Country Back"	3:41
5.	"Airfield"	4:46
6.	"Rabble Rouser"	4:22
7.	"Shinrin-yoku"	4:15
8.	"Undercover Agents"	4:24
9.	"The Revolt of the Atoms"	4:42
10.	"An Ode to Lost Jigsaw Pieces (In Two Movements)"	5:55
11.	"The Embers"	0:44

Japanese bonus tracks
No.	Title	Length
12.	"Redshift"	3:58
13.	"Supercharge" (feat. Big Narstie)	3:33

== Personnel ==
Personnel per booklet.

Enter Shikari

- Rou Reynolds – lead vocals, keyboards, programming, piano, guitar, trumpet
- Rory Clewlow – lead guitar, vocals, mbira
- Chris Batten – bass, vocals, organ
- Rob Rolfe – drums, percussion

Additional musicians

- David Kosten – additional keyboards, programming
- Will Harvey – violin
- Augusta Harris – cello
- Julz Baldwin, Eman Kwenortey, Nathan Killham, Jamie Whymark, Alex Cribbs, Jack Goodwin, Lee Jeffrey, Matt Pendell, Arun Chamba, William Tallis, Matt Knowles, Daniel Griffin, Nathan Harlow, Adam Holdsworth, Zac Houili, George Rockett, Ben Gibson, Patrick O'Hanlon, Clementyne Lavender, Danny Price, Jonathan Kogan, Leo Taylor, Hollie Robinson, Zoe London, Lee Burgess, Ian Drayner, James Power, Corinne Cumming, Fraser Woodhouse, Pip Newby – gang vocals

Production

- David Kosten – producer, mixing, recording
- Rou Reynolds – producer, additional recording, art direction
- Tim Morris – recording
- Luke Gibbs – studio assistant
- Bob Ludwig – mastering (CD/digital)
- Stuart Hawkes – mastering (vinyl)
- Richard Littler – design, layout, photo edits
- Ian Johnsen – art direction
- Pip Newby - A&R
- Jennifer McCord – band photo
- Modo – artwork ("machine")
- Agata Wolanska – object photos

== Charts ==
Chart (2017)	Peak position
Australian Albums (ARIA)	56
Austrian Albums (Ö3 Austria)	50
Belgian Albums (Ultratop Flanders)	68
Belgian Albums (Ultratop Wallonia)	173
German Albums (Offizielle Top 100)	60
Scottish Albums (OCC)	4
UK Albums (OCC)	5
UK Independent Albums (OCC)	1
UK Rock & Metal Albums (OCC)	2
