= Lose Your Self =

Studio album by Enter Shikari
- Released: 10 April 2026
- Length: 41:20
- Labels: So; Silva Screen; Enter Shikari Limited
- Producer: Rou Reynolds

Enter Shikari chronology
A Kiss for the Whole World (2023)	Lose Your Self (2026)

Professional ratings
Aggregate scores
Source	Rating
Metacritic	75/100
Review scores
Source	Rating
Clash	8/10
Kerrang!	4/5
Sputnikmusic	3/5

Lose Your Self is the eighth studio album by the English rock band Enter Shikari, released on 10 April 2026 through So Recordings and Silva Screen Recordings. Produced by frontman Rou Reynolds, the album was surprise released with no preceding singles, subsequently reaching number sixteen on the UK Albums Chart.

== Background and production ==
Recording for Lose Your Self was slower than that of previous records. Reynolds first hinted towards new material from the band in October 2024, saying that it was still "early days" and that he would be writing intermittently while touring, and that he planned to focus on writing more in 2025. Interviewed later at Reading Festival in August 2025, he stated that the band was taking their time with their next album and expressed a desire to make sure the record was "interesting and exciting."

The album was ultimately recorded over the course of three years, with Reynolds (the album's sole producer) admitting that the process and his self-described perfectionist tendencies took a toll on his physical and mental health. “We never did the romantic thing of going away to a cottage for a few months, recording the bulk of the album and then just applying finishing touches," Reynolds told Clash in April 2026. "It was this disjointed affair where we recorded it on tour, in all sorts of different studios and at our houses." By the final month of the recording process, Reynolds was "basically just not sleeping" as he co-ordinated mixing and mastering with engineers in New Zealand and Nashville respectively.

== Themes and music ==
The primary theme of Lose Your Self was summed up by Rou Reynolds as the need to "lose the idea of the self and become much more focused on wholeness and oneness," in addition to further themes of anti-capitalism, environmentalism, modern individualism, and division in the modern world. He described the title track as a "command" to humanity to reject individualism, and embrace "community and human connection.”

The band wanted the record to serve as a contrast to their previous album, A Kiss for the Whole World, with the band describing it upon release as "one of our darkest and heaviest albums," whilst still "[preaching] hope and [offering] answers." Reynolds expanded on this in subsequent interviews, clarifying to Kerrang in April 2026 that the record's darker direction didn't mean it was devoid of "moments of lightness and hope, but these things are instinctual. I don’t want to be an optimist or a pessimist, I want to be a realist, but a lot of it is a reflection of the world that we’re experiencing.”

== Release and promotion ==
In January 2026, Enter Shikari announced their largest ever UK headline tour, scheduled for November of that year, alongside a new logo. Ahead of this tour, the band also played an intimate show at Satan's Hollow in Manchester on 9 April 2026, the 20th anniversary of the band's first show in the city. At this show, the band debuted a brand new song "Find Out the Hard Way..." and announced their new album would be released at midnight.

Lose Your Self was subsequently released on 10 April 2026, alongside the announcement of a series of intimate shows throughout April. This was followed by the music video for "Find Out the Hard Way..." on 15 April 2026.

== Track listing ==
All lyrics are written by Rou Reynolds; all music is composed by Enter Shikari.

Lose Your Self track listing
No.	Title	Length
1.	"Lose Your Self"	4:18
2.	"Find Out the Hard Way..."	4:26
3.	"Dead In the Water"	3:08
4.	"Demons"	3:37
5.	"The Flick of a Switch I."	3:32
6.	"I Can't Keep My Hands Clean"	1:28
7.	"It's OK"	4:19
8.	"The Flick of a Switch II."	2:10
9.	"Shipwrecked!"	3:39
10.	"Spaceship Earth (I. Avec Abandon)"	2:56
11.	"Spaceship Earth (II. Angoscioso)"	4:27
12.	"Spaceship Earth (III. Maestoso)"	3:16
Total length:		41:20

== Personnel ==
Adapted from album liner notes.

Enter Shikari

- Rou Reynolds – vocals, guitar, synthesiser, trumpet, orchestral arrangements, production
- Rory Clewlow – guitar, backing vocals
- Chris Batten – bass, synthesiser, vocals
- Rob Rolfe – drums, percussion, backing vocals

Additional musicians

- Rick Clark – orchestration
- Paul Campbell – orchestration
- City of Prague Philharmonic Orchestra

Production

- George Perks – engineering
- Clint Murphy – mixing (tracks 1-3, 5-12)
- Dan Weller – mixing (track 4)
- Ryan Smith – mastering
- Virtual Riot – additional production

== Charts ==
Chart performance for Lose Your Self
Chart (2026)	Peak position
Australian Albums (ARIA)	45
Scottish Albums (Official Charts)	7
UK Albums (Official Charts)	16
UK Rock & Metal Albums (Official Charts)	1
