= Redshift (Enter Shikari song) =

Single by Enter Shikari
- Released: 12 January 2016
- Recorded: November–December 2015
- Genre: Indie rock
- Length: 3:57
- Label: Ambush Reality, PIAS Recordings
- Composer(s): Enter Shikari
- Lyricist(s): Rou Reynolds
- Producer(s): Enter Shikari, Dan Weller

Enter Shikari singles chronology
"Slipshod (Urbandawn Remix)" (2015)	"Redshift" (2016)	"Hoodwinker" (2016)

"Redshift" is a single by British rock band Enter Shikari. The song was first played on BBC Radio 1 on 11 January 2016 and released as a digital single the day after. An official video for the song directed by Mike Tyler was released on YouTube the same day.

== Track listing ==
All lyrics are written by Rou Reynolds; all music is composed by Enter Shikari

No.	Title	Length
1.	"Redshift"	3:57

== Personnel ==
- Roughton "Rou" Reynolds – lead vocals, synthesizer, keyboards, programming
- Chris Batten – bass guitar, vocals
- Liam "Rory" Clewlow – guitar, vocals
- Rob Rolfe – drums, percussion, backing vocals

== Chart performance ==
Chart (2016)	Peak position
UK Rock Chart	14
UK Indie Chart	37
