= Mothership (song) =

Single by Enter Shikari
- Released: 27 August 2006; 11 January 2011 (Motherstep/Mothership)
- Recorded: 2006
- Genre: Post-hardcore; trance; electronicore; metalcore
- Length: 4:50 (demo version); 4:30 (album version); 6:23 (Motherstep version)
- Label: Ambush Reality
- Songwriters: Chris Batten, Rou Reynolds, Rob Rolfe, Rory Clewlow
- Producer: Enter Shikari

Enter Shikari singles chronology
"Mothership" (2006)	"Sorry You're Not a Winner/OK Time for Plan B" (2006)

"Mothership" is the first single by Enter Shikari. It was released as a digital download and a very limited run of 100 CD singles. It was released in August 2006. There was no vinyl released. It was available from their online store and from iTunes. It has been featured as single of the week on the iTunes Store.

A video has been made for this single, which is viewable on the band's website. The song has since been re-recorded and was included on Enter Shikari's debut album, Take to the Skies. When performed live, a set of dubstep intros, collectively known as "Motherstep," is sometimes played along with the song. A single of the "Motherstep" version of "Mothership," recorded in 2010 at the Hammersmith Apollo, was released as a single on 26 January 2011.

== Track listing ==
Mothership single

No.	Title	Length
1.	"Mothership" (Summer 2006 Download Version)	4:50

Motherstep/Mothership single

No.	Title	Length
1.	"Motherstep/Mothership" (live @ Hammersmith Apollo 2010)	6:22

== Video ==
The video for "Mothership" was shot at The Underworld in Camden, London on 2 July 2006 at a live performance and was filmed by overhead cameras, angled from the ceiling.

== Chart performance ==
Chart (2006)	Peak position
UK Singles Chart	151
UK Indie Chart	24

== Personnel ==
- Roughton "Rou" Reynolds – lead vocals, electronics
- Liam "Rory" Clewlow – guitar, backing vocals
- Chris Batten – bass, backing vocals
- Rob Rolfe – drums
