= Anything Can Happen in the Next Half Hour =

"Anything Can Happen in the Next Half Hour..."

Single by Enter Shikari

from the album Take to the Skies
- Released: 18 February 2007
- Recorded: The Outhouse, Reading, UK, 2006 - 2007
- Genre: Trance; metalcore; post-hardcore
- Length: 4:40
- Label: Ambush Reality
- Songwriters: Chris Batten, Rou Reynolds, Rob Rolfe, Rory Clewlow

Enter Shikari singles chronology
"Sorry You're Not a Winner/OK Time for Plan B" (2006)	"Anything Can Happen in the Next Half Hour..." (2007)	"Jonny Sniper" (2007)

"Anything Can Happen in the Next Half Hour..." (often shortened to "Anything Can Happen") is a song by English electronic rock band Enter Shikari, the track was released as the second single from their album Take to the Skies. It was released on 18 February 2007 for digital download and on 5 March 2007 on both CD and 7" vinyl. It is the band's highest charting single, charting at #27 in the UK single chart, and number 1 on the UK indie chart. There are two remixes of the song, Colon Open Bracket Remix and Grayedout Mix. Both are up for download on their official download store.

== Track listing ==
- CD
1. "Anything Can Happen in the Next Half Hour..." (Rou, Enter Shikari) - 4:40
2. "Kickin' Back on the Surface of Your Cheek" (Rou, Enter Shikari) - 3:50
3. "Keep It on Ice" (Rou) - 2:51
- 7"
1. "Anything Can Happen in the Next Half Hour..." (Rou, Enter Shikari) - 4:40
2. "Kickin' Back on the Surface of Your Cheek" (Rou, Enter Shikari) - 3:50

== Original version ==
In the original version of the song, a sample is heard from the introduction of the popular 1960s TV series Stingray in which the character says "Anything can happen in the next half hour". This is, however, not heard in the re-recorded version.

== Chart performance ==
Chart (2007)	Peak position
Japan	173
UK Singles Chart	27
UK Indie Chart	1
UK Rock Chart	1

"Anything Can Happen in the Next Half Hour"
An 26-second audio sample of the song "'Anything Can Happen in the Next Half Hour".

== Personnel ==
Enter Shikari

- Roughton "Rou" Reynolds - vocals, electronics
- Liam "Rory" Clewlow - guitar
- Chris Batten - bass, vocals
- Rob Rolfe - drums

Production

- Enter Shikari - production
- John Mitchell - recording
- Ben Humphreys - recording
- Martin Giles - mastering
- Keaton Henson - illustration, design
