= Take to the Skies =

Studio album by Enter Shikari
- Released: 19 March 2007
- Recorded: 2006–07
- Studios: The Outhouse, Reading, England
- Genres: Post-hardcore; electronicore; metalcore; trance
- Length: 52:43
- Label: Ambush Reality
- Producer: Enter Shikari

Enter Shikari chronology
Anything Can Happen in the Next Half Hour (2004)	Take to the Skies (2007)	The Zone (2007)

Singles from Take to the Skies
- 1. "Sorry You're Not a Winner"/"OK Time for Plan B" Released: 29 October 2006; 2. "Anything Can Happen in the Next Half Hour" Released: 18 February 2007; 3. "Jonny Sniper" Released: 18 June 2007

Take to the Skies is the debut studio album by the English rock band Enter Shikari. It was first published in the United Kingdom on March 19, 2007. In its first week alone, 28,000 copies of the album were sold, allowing it to reach number 4 on the official UK album charts. Furthermore, more than 250,000 copies have been sold worldwide to date. In the UK, it later received Gold Record status for over 100,000 sales. The two songs "Anything Can Happen in the Next Half Hour" and "Jonny Sniper" were released as singles.

== Background and recording ==
Following the demise of Hybryd, Enter Shikari was formed with Rou Reynolds on vocals, Rory Clewlow on guitar, Chris Batten on bass, and Rob Rolfe on drums. In 2003 and 2004, the group self-released three EPs – Nodding Acquaintance (2003), Sorry You're Not a Winner (2004) and Anything Can Happen in the Next Half Hour (2004) – that they sold at shows and used to help grow their fan base. With an increasing touring schedule, the group began using social networking platform Myspace. In August, the band posted a demo version of "Labyrinth", followed by a demo of "OK, Time for Plan B" in September. In mid-2006, the group established their own record label, Ambush Reality, and digitally released the "Mothership" single. Between July and October 2006, the band embarked on their first headlining tour of the United Kingdom. Recording sessions for Take to the Skies took place at The Outhouse in Reading with John Mitchell and Ben Humphreys. The group, Joel De'ath, Ben Shute, Ian Shortshaft and Tim Boardman contributed gang vocals. The group produced the sessions and Martin Giles mastered the recordings at Alchemy Soho in London.

The album contains re-recorded versions of many songs that were featured on demos, singles and EPs released in the years prior to their debut. "Sorry You're Not A Winner" was first on the band's second EP "Sorry You're Not A Winner" in 2003. It was later re-recorded in 2006 along with "OK, Time For Plan B" (which was a previously released demo in 2005) for the band's second single "Sorry You're Not a Winner"/"OK Time for Plan B". "Jonny Sniper" and "Anything Can Happen In The Next Half Hour..." were both on the band's third EP Anything Can Happen in the Next Half Hour in 2004; they were completely re-recorded for the album. A demo version of "Mothership" was previously released for the band's first single in 2006. Also "Enter Shikari", "Labyrinth", and "Return to Energiser" were released as demos from 2005 to 2006.

== Release ==
Take to the Skies was released on 19 March 2007. On the album's physical release, tracks 1, 5, 9, 11, 13 and 17 are untitled. However, the untitled tracks have been given names on the digital versions and other retailer descriptions. Track 1 is universally titled "Stand Your Ground; This Is Ancient Land". In most cases tracks 5, 9, 11 and 13 are all titled "Interlude", sometimes being numbered. Track 17 is typically titled "Closing". On digital versions, tracks 9 and 17 are both titled Reprise 1 and 2, respectively.

The digital version differs from the physical release. It combines 4 of the untitled tracks with album tracks, bringing the total tracks to 13 instead of 17. Also, this version has a slightly different mix. In particular, it's missing song transitions and in some instances sound effects. The song "Sorry, You're Not a Winner" was later included on the soundtrack of EA Sports' NHL 08 video game.

In early June, the group performed at Download Festival. "Jonny Sniper" was released as a single on 18 June. In early August, the group headlined Kerrang!'s Day of Rock event. To promote the Kerrang! Awards, the group played a one-off show in London in late August. After the release of the album in Europe, the band spent a long period of time finding a distributor, which they would need to release the album in North America. Finally they signed to Tiny Evil Records and the album was released on October 30. It has been released as a CD, a CD+DVD edition and vinyl version with an embossed gatefold sleeve. They ended the year with a short West Coast US tour.

On July 18, 2013, the band announced a repressing of the vinyl on a new colourway (green and beige), limited to just 500 copies, coming with a signed artwork print, for official release on August 5. The pressing was down to fans paying high prices on auction sites for original copies, and it sold out within a few hours of going on sale.

== Reception ==
Professional ratings
Review scores
Source	Rating
AbsolutePunk	6.5/10 stars
AllMusic	3/5 stars
BBC Music	3/5 stars
Drowned in Sound	3/5 stars
The Guardian	3/5 stars
NME	(8/10)
Pitchfork	(6.7/10.0)
Spin	3/5 stars

On March 25, 2007, it reached #4 in the Official UK Album Chart selling 28,000 copies in its first week. The album reached worldwide sales of 200,000 copies and was certified Gold in the UK after selling over 100,000 copies. It is also the first album to achieve a significant chart success for a new act operating outside the traditional label system.

== Track listing ==
All lyrics by Rou Reynolds, all music by Enter Shikari.

Physical version
No.	Title	Length
1.	"Stand Your Ground; This Is Ancient Land"	1:08
2.	"Enter Shikari"	2:52
3.	"Mothership"	4:30
4.	"Anything Can Happen in the Next Half Hour..."	4:32
5.	"Interlude 1"	1:01
6.	"Labyrinth"	3:51
7.	"No Sssweat"	3:16
8.	"Today Won’t Go Down in History"	3:34
9.	"Interlude 2"	1:28
10.	"Return to Energiser"	4:35
11.	"Interlude 3"	0:18
12.	"Sorry, You're Not a Winner"	3:52
13.	"Interlude 4"	0:35
14.	"Jonny Sniper"	4:01
15.	"Adieu"	5:40
16.	"OK, Time for Plan B"	4:55
17.	"Closing"	2:44
Total length:		52:43

Digital version
No.	Title	Length
1.	"Enter Shikari"	4:07
2.	"Mothership"	4:37
3.	"Anything Can Happen in the Next Half Hour"	5:43
4.	"Labyrinth"	3:57
5.	"No Sssweat"	3:20
6.	"Today Won't Go Down in History"	3:39
7.	"Reprise 1"	1:33
8.	"Return to Energiser"	4:39
9.	"Sorry You're Not a Winner"	4:15
10.	"Jonny Sniper"	4:36
11.	"Adieu"	5:42
12.	"OK, Time for Plan B"	5:06
13.	"Reprise 2"	2:44

- Track 1 combines Stand Your Ground; This Is Ancient Land and Enter Shikari.
- Track 3 combines Anything Can Happen in the Next Half Hour... and Interlude 1.
- Track 7 is the same as Interlude 2, just re-titled.
- Track 9 combines Interlude 3 and Sorry, You're Not a Winner.
- Track 10 combines Interlude 4 and Jonny Sniper.
- Track 13 is the same as Closing, just re-titled.

Live at the Astoria DVD
No.	Title	Length
1.	"Labyrinth"
2.	"The Feast"
3.	"Sorry You're Not a Winner"

== Charts and certifications ==
=== Weekly charts ===
Chart (2007)	Peak position
Belgian Albums (Ultratop Flanders)	89
German Albums (Offizielle Top 100)	93
Irish Albums (IRMA)	26
Japanese Albums (Oricon)	31
Scottish Albums (Official Charts)	6
UK Albums (Official Charts)	4
UK Rock & Metal Albums (Official Charts)	1

=== Year-end charts ===
Chart (2007)	Position
UK Albums (OCC)	170

=== Certifications ===
Region	Certification	Certified units/sales
United Kingdom (BPI)	Gold	100,000^{^}
^{^} Shipments figures based on certification alone.

== Personnel ==
Personnel per booklet.

Enter Shikari

- Rou Reynolds – lead vocals, electronics, lap steel guitar
- Chris Batten – bass, co-vocals
- Rory Clewlow – lead guitar, backing vocals
- Rob Rolfe – drums

Additional musicians

- Enter Shikari – gang vocals
- Joel De'ath – gang vocals
- Ben Shute – gang vocals
- Ian Shortshaft – gang vocals
- Tim Boardman – gang vocals

Production

- Enter Shikari – producer
- John Mitchell – recording
- Ben Humphreys – recording
- Martin Giles – mastering
- Peter Hill – photo
- Keaton Henson – illustration, design
