= List of UK Country Albums Chart number ones of 2007 =

These are the Official Charts Company's UK Country Albums Chart number ones of 2007. The chart week runs from Friday to Thursday with the chart-date given as the following Thursday. Chart positions are based the multi-metric consumption of country music in the United Kingdom, blending traditional album sales, track equivalent albums, and streaming equivalent albums. The chart contains 20 positions.

In the iteration of the chart dated 7 January, Johnny Cash's 2002 release American IV: The Man Comes Around spent its thirty seventh week at number one, having also held the top spot in the final week of 2006. The album remained there for the first five weeks of 2007, and later returned for a week in May. Cash's seminal live album At San Quentin also spent ten weeks at number one throughout the year. Taking the Long Way by the Dixie Chicks spent a fifth and sixth total week at number one, having previously reached the chart peak the previous year, while Alison Krauss held the top spot for two weeks with her greatest hits collection A Hundred Miles or More. Carrie Underwood's debut album Some Hearts also earned its first and only week at number one on the chart dated 3 June, having debuted in January 2006. Ryan Adams' Easy Tiger spent the most weeks at number one in 2007, holding the top spot for eleven consecutive weeks from July to September before being displaced by Prism by Beth Nielsen Chapman, her second UK number one. LeAnn Rimes achieved her seventh UK number one when her Family album spent three consecutive weeks at number one. It was displaced on 4 November by Long Road Out of Eden, the final studio release by the Eagles, which remained there for the remaining nine weeks of the year.

== Chart history ==
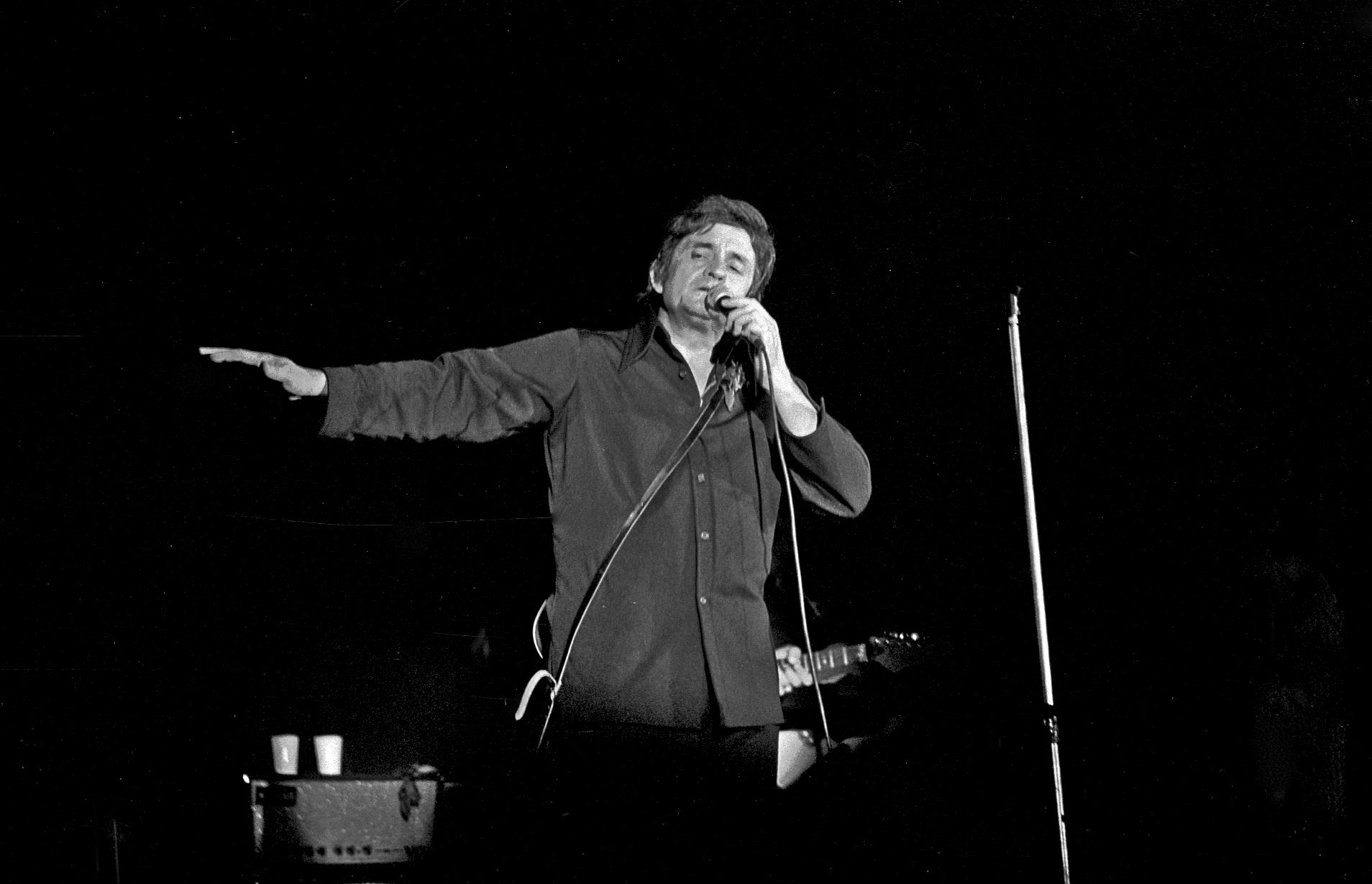
Johnny Cash spent a total of 16 weeks at number one throughout 2007 with his The Man Comes Around and At San Quentin albums.

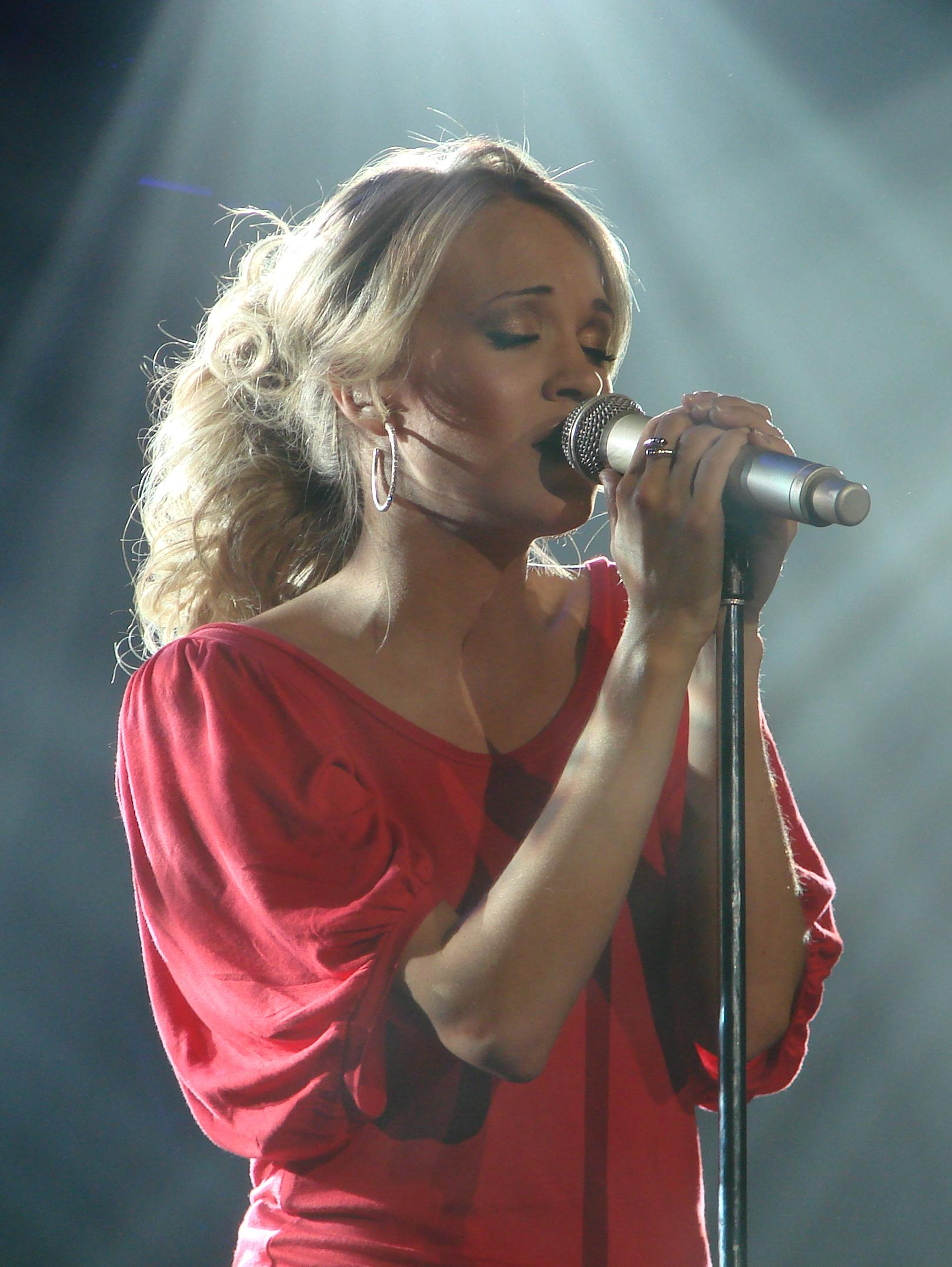
Carrie Underwood achieved her first UK number one when her debut Some Hearts reached the top in June.

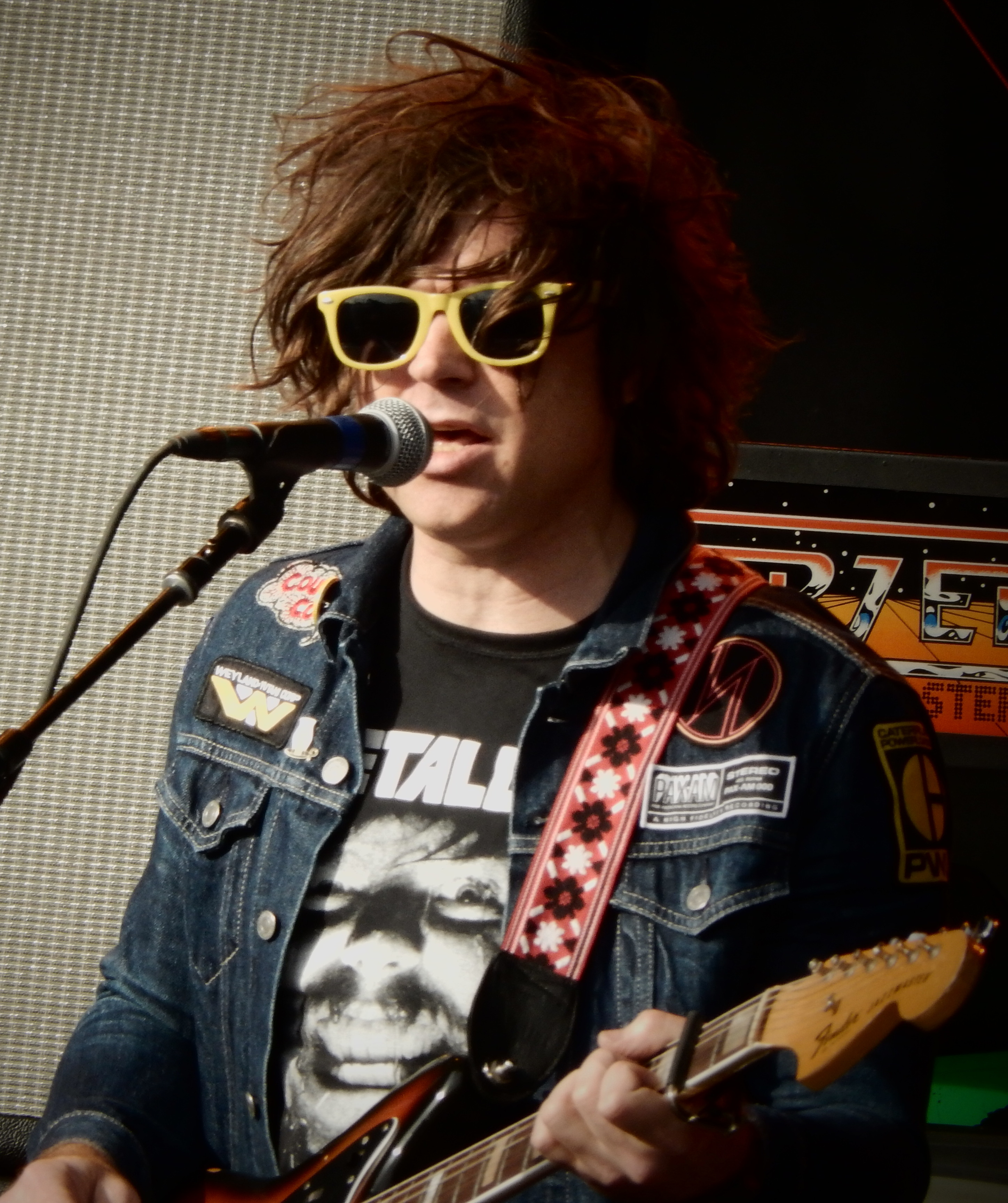
Easy Tiger by Ryan Adams held the top spot for 11 weeks, the most of any album in 2007.

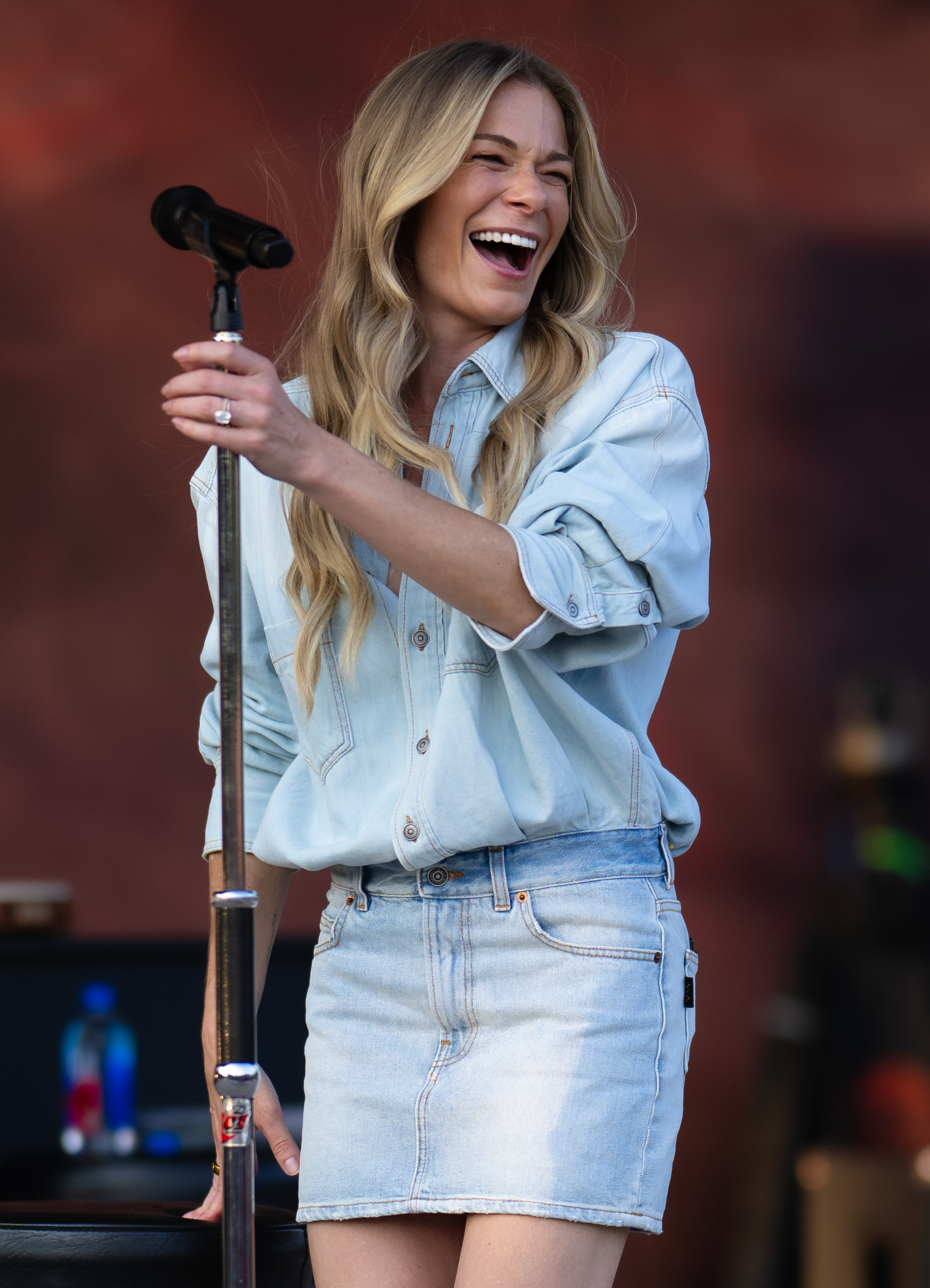
Leann Rimes earned her seventh UK number one album when Family reached the chart peak and stayed for 3 weeks.

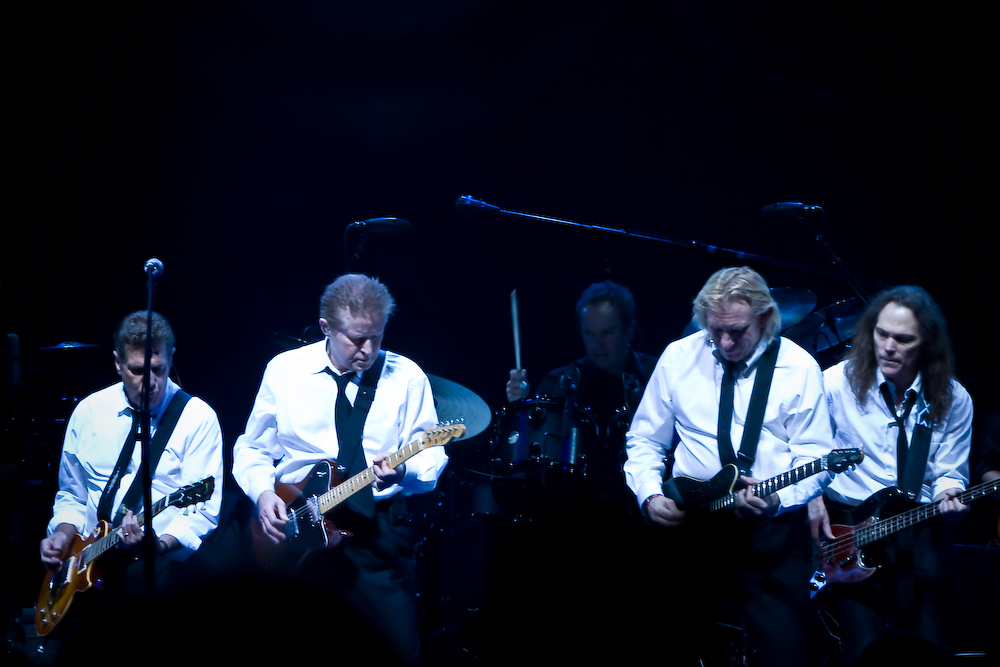
The Eagles' final studio release Long Road Out of Eden spent 9 consecutive weeks at number one.

Issue date	Album	Artist(s)	Record label	Ref.
7 January	American IV: The Man Comes Around	Johnny Cash	American Recordings	
14 January	American IV: The Man Comes Around	Johnny Cash	American Recordings	
21 January	American IV: The Man Comes Around	Johnny Cash	American Recordings	
28 January	American IV: The Man Comes Around	Johnny Cash	American Recordings	
4 February	American IV: The Man Comes Around	Johnny Cash	American Recordings	
11 February	13 Cities	Richmond Fontaine	Decor	
18 February	Taking the Long Way	Dixie Chicks	Open Wide	
25 February	At San Quentin	Johnny Cash	Columbia	
4 March	At San Quentin	Johnny Cash	Columbia	
11 March	At San Quentin	Johnny Cash	Columbia	
18 March	At San Quentin	Johnny Cash	Columbia	
25 March	At San Quentin	Johnny Cash	Columbia	
1 April	At San Quentin	Johnny Cash	Columbia	
8 April	A Hundred Miles or More: A Collection	Alison Krauss	Rounder	
15 April	A Hundred Miles or More: A Collection	Alison Krauss	Rounder	
22 April	Weapons of Grass Destruction	Hayseed Dixie	Cooking Vinyl	
29 April	At San Quentin	Johnny Cash	Columbia	
6 May	At San Quentin	Johnny Cash	Columbia	
13 May	American IV: The Man Comes Around	Johnny Cash	American Recordings	
20 May	At San Quentin	Johnny Cash	Columbia	
27 May	One of the Boys	Gretchen Wilson	Columbia	
3 June	Some Hearts	Carrie Underwood	Arista Nashville	
10 June	Taking the Long Way	Dixie Chicks	Open Wide	
17 June	At San Quentin	Johnny Cash	Columbia	
24 June	Little Amber Bottles	Blanche	Loose	
1 July	Easy Tiger	Ryan Adams	Lost Highway	
8 July	Easy Tiger	Ryan Adams	Lost Highway	
15 July	Easy Tiger	Ryan Adams	Lost Highway	
22 July	Easy Tiger	Ryan Adams	Lost Highway	
29 July	Easy Tiger	Ryan Adams	Lost Highway	
5 August	Easy Tiger	Ryan Adams	Lost Highway	
12 August	Easy Tiger	Ryan Adams	Lost Highway	
19 August	Easy Tiger	Ryan Adams	Lost Highway	
26 August	Easy Tiger	Ryan Adams	Lost Highway	
2 September	Easy Tiger	Ryan Adams	Lost Highway	
9 September	Easy Tiger	Ryan Adams	Lost Highway	
23 September	Prism	Beth Nielsen Chapman	BNC	
30 September	Prism	Beth Nielsen Chapman	BNC	
7 October	Washington Square Serenade	Steve Earle	New West	
14 October	Family	LeAnn Rimes	Curb	
21 October	Family	LeAnn Rimes	Curb	
28 October	Family	LeAnn Rimes	Curb	
4 November	Long Road Out of Eden	Eagles	Polydor	
11 November	Long Road Out of Eden	Eagles	Polydor	
18 November	Long Road Out of Eden	Eagles	Polydor	
25 November	Long Road Out of Eden	Eagles	Polydor	
2 December	Long Road Out of Eden	Eagles	Polydor	
9 December	Long Road Out of Eden	Eagles	Polydor	
16 December	Long Road Out of Eden	Eagles	Polydor	
23 December	Long Road Out of Eden	Eagles	Polydor	
30 December	Long Road Out of Eden	Eagles	Polydor	

== Most weeks at number one ==
Weeks at number one	Artist
16	Johnny Cash
11	Ryan Adams
9	Eagles
3	LeAnn Rimes
2	Alison Krauss
2	Beth Nielsen Chapman
2	Dixie Chicks

== See also ==
- List of UK Albums Chart number ones of 2007
- List of UK Dance Singles Chart number ones of 2007
- List of UK Album Downloads Chart number ones of 2007
- List of UK Independent Albums Chart number ones of 2007
- List of UK R&B Albums Chart number ones of 2007
- List of UK Rock & Metal Albums Chart number ones of 2007
- List of UK Compilation Chart number ones of the 2000s
