= List of UK R&B Singles Chart number ones of 2007 =

The logo of the Official Charts Company, responsible for compiling all of the official music charts in the United Kingdom, including the R&B singles chart.

The UK R&B Chart is a weekly chart that ranks the 40 biggest-selling singles and albums that are classified in the R&B genre in the United Kingdom. The chart is compiled by the Official Charts Company, and is based on both physical and digital sales. This is a list of the UK's biggest R&B hits of 2007.

== Number ones ==
Key
†	Best-selling R&B single of the year

Issue date	Single	Artist
7 January	"Tell Me"	P.Diddy featuring Christina Aguilera
14 January	"You Know I'm No Good"	Amy Winehouse
21 January	"Too Little Too Late"	JoJo
28 January	"Too Little Too Late"	JoJo
4 February	"Too Little Too Late"	JoJo
11 February	"Pac's Life"	2Pac featuring T.I. and Ashanti
18 February	"I Wanna Love You"	Akon featuring Snoop Dogg
25 February	"Lil Star"	Kelis featuring CeeLo Green
4 March	"The Sweet Escape"	Gwen Stefani featuring Akon
11 March	"The Sweet Escape"	Gwen Stefani featuring Akon
18 March	"Last Night"	P.Diddy featuring Keyshia Cole
25 March	"Glamorous"	Fergie
1 April	"Glamorous"	Fergie
8 April	"Like a Boy"	Ciara
15 April	"Give it to Me"	Timbaland featuring Nelly Furtado & Justin Timberlake
22 April	"Beautiful Liar"	Beyoncé and Shakira
29 April	"Beautiful Liar"	Beyoncé and Shakira
6 May	"Beautiful Liar"	Beyoncé and Shakira
13 May	"Don't Matter"	Akon
20 May	"Beautiful Liar"	Beyoncé and Shakira
27 May	"Beautiful Liar"	Beyoncé and Shakira
3 June	"Umbrella"	Rihanna featuring Jay-Z
10 June	"Umbrella"	Rihanna featuring Jay-Z
17 June	"Umbrella"	Rihanna featuring Jay-Z
24 June	"Umbrella"	Rihanna featuring Jay-Z
1 July	"Umbrella"	Rihanna featuring Jay-Z
8 July	"Umbrella"	Rihanna featuring Jay-Z
15 July	"Big Girls Don't Cry"	Fergie
22 July	"Big Girls Don't Cry"	Fergie
29 July	"The Way I Are"	Timbaland featuring Keri Hilson
5 August	"The Way I Are"	Timbaland featuring Keri Hilson
12 August	"The Way I Are"	Timbaland featuring Keri Hilson
19 August	"Stronger"	Kanye West
26 August	"Stronger"	Kanye West
2 September	"Beautiful Girls"	Sean Kingston
9 September	"Beautiful Girls"	Sean Kingston
16 September	"Beautiful Girls"	Sean Kingston
23 September	"Beautiful Girls"	Sean Kingston
30 September	"Ayo Technology"	50 Cent featuring Justin Timberlake & Timbaland
7 October	"About You Now"	Sugababes
14 October	"About You Now"	Sugababes
21 October	"Valerie"	Mark Ronson featuring Amy Winehouse
21 October	"Bleeding Love" †	Leona Lewis
28 October	"Bleeding Love" †	Leona Lewis
4 November	"Bleeding Love" †	Leona Lewis
11 November	"Bleeding Love" †	Leona Lewis
18 November	"Bleeding Love" †	Leona Lewis
25 November	"Bleeding Love" †	Leona Lewis
2 December	"Bleeding Love" †	Leona Lewis
9 December	"Bleeding Love" †	Leona Lewis
16 December	"Bleeding Love" †	Leona Lewis
23 December	"Crank That (Soulja Boy)"	Soulja Boy
30 December	"Crank That (Soulja Boy)"	Soulja Boy

== See also ==
- List of UK Dance Singles Chart number ones of 2007
- List of UK Independent Singles Chart number ones of 2007
- List of UK Singles Downloads Chart number ones of the 2000s
- List of UK Rock & Metal Singles Chart number ones of 2007
- List of UK R&B Albums Chart number ones of 2007
