= List of UK Independent Albums Chart number ones of 2007 =

These are the Official Charts Company's UK Indie Chart number-one albums of 2007.

== Chart history ==
Issue date	Album	Artist(s)	Record label	Ref.
7 January	Down In Albion	Babyshambles	Rough Trade	
14 January	Candylion	Gruff Rhys	Rough Trade	
21 January	Standing in the Way of Control	Gossip	Back Yard	
28 January	Make This Your Own	Cooper Temple Clause	Sequel	
4 February	Standing in the Way of Control	Gossip	Back Yard	
11 February	Standing in the Way of Control	Gossip	Back Yard	
18 February	Reformation Post TLC	The Fall	Slogan	
25 February	Standing in the Way of Control	Gossip	Back Yard	
4 March	Standing in the Way of Control	Gossip	Back Yard	
11 March	Make Another World	Idlewild	Sequel	
18 March	Standing in the Way of Control	Gossip	Back Yard	
25 March	Take to the Skies	Enter Shikari	Ambush Reality	
1 April	Take to the Skies	Enter Shikari	Ambush Reality	
8 April	Our Earthly Pleasures	Maxïmo Park	Warp	
15 April	Our Earthly Pleasures	Maxïmo Park	Warp	
22 April	Elements of Life	Tiësto	Nebula	
29 April	Favourite Worst Nightmare	Arctic Monkeys	Domino	
6 May	Favourite Worst Nightmare	Arctic Monkeys	Domino	
13 May	Favourite Worst Nightmare	Arctic Monkeys	Domino	
20 May	Favourite Worst Nightmare	Arctic Monkeys	Domino	
27 May	Favourite Worst Nightmare	Arctic Monkeys	Domino	
3 June	Wait for Me	Pigeon Detectives	Dance to the Radio	
10 June	Maths + English	Dizzee Rascal	XL	
17 June	Maths + English	Dizzee Rascal	XL	
24 June	Icky Thump	The White Stripes	XL	
1 July	Icky Thump	The White Stripes	XL	
8 July	Icky Thump	The White Stripes	XL	
15 July	Favourite Worst Nightmare	Arctic Monkeys	Domino	
22 July	Favourite Worst Nightmare	Arctic Monkeys	Domino	
29 July	Favourite Worst Nightmare	Arctic Monkeys	Domino	
5 August	Favourite Worst Nightmare	Arctic Monkeys	Domino	
12 August	The Ultimate Collection	The Kinks	Sanctuary	
19 August	Wait for Me	Pigeon Detectives	Dance to the Radio	
26 August	Wait for Me	Pigeon Detectives	Dance to the Radio	
2 September	Wait for Me	Pigeon Detectives	Dance to the Radio	
9 September	Wait for Me	Pigeon Detectives	Dance to the Radio	
16 September	Proof of Youth	The Go! Team	Memphis Industries	
23 September	The State of Things	Reverend and The Makers	Wall of Sound	
30 September	The State of Things	Reverend and The Makers	Wall of Sound	
7 October	Pictures	Katie Melua	Dramatico	
14 October	Matinée	Jack Peñate	XL	
21 October	Pictures	Katie Melua	Dramatico	
28 October	Pictures	Katie Melua	Dramatico	
4 November	Together Again	Daniel O'Donnell & Mary Duff	Rosette	
11 November	Together Again	Daniel O'Donnell & Mary Duff	Rosette	
18 November	Pictures	Katie Melua	Dramatico	
25 November	Pictures	Katie Melua	Dramatico	
2 December	Over the Rainbow	Connie Talbot	Rainbow	
9 December	Over the Rainbow	Connie Talbot	Rainbow	
16 December	Pictures	Katie Melua	Dramatico	
23 December	Pictures	Katie Melua	Dramatico	
30 December	Pictures	Katie Melua	Dramatico	

== See also ==
- List of number-one albums of 2007 (UK)
- List of UK Independent Singles Chart number ones of 2007
- List of UK Rock Chart number-one albums of 2007
- List of UK R&B Albums Chart number ones of 2007
