= Let There Be Rockgrass =

Studio album by Hayseed Dixie
- Released: August 2, 2004
- Genre: Rockgrass
- Label: Cooking Vinyl
- Producer: John Wheeler

Hayseed Dixie chronology
Kiss My Grass: A Hillbilly Tribute to Kiss (2003)	Let There Be Rockgrass (2004)	A Hot Piece of Grass (2005)

Let There Be Rockgrass is the fourth album by American band Hayseed Dixie, released in 2004. The album's title and cover is a play on the AC/DC album Let There Be Rock and continued the theme of adding grass to known phrases for Hayseed Dixie album titles.

== Track listing ==
1. "Dirty Deeds Done Dirt Cheap" (AC/DC cover) (live recording)
2. "Fat Bottomed Girls" (Queen cover)
3. "Whole Lotta Rosie" (AC/DC cover)
4. "You Shook Me All Night Long" (AC/DC cover) (live recording)
5. "I Believe in a Thing Called Love" (The Darkness cover)
6. "Ace of Spades" (Motörhead cover)
7. "Detroit Rock City" (Kiss cover)
8. "Corn Liquor"
9. "Feel Like Makin' Love" (Bad Company cover)
10. "Walk This Way" (Aerosmith cover)
11. "Touch Too Much" (AC/DC cover)
12. "Centerfold" (The J. Geils Band cover)
13. "I'm Keeping Your Poop"
14. "Highway to Hell" (AC/DC cover) (live recording)
15. "Will the Circle Be Unbroken" (live recording)
