= John Wheeler (musician) =

American singer-songwriter (born 1970)

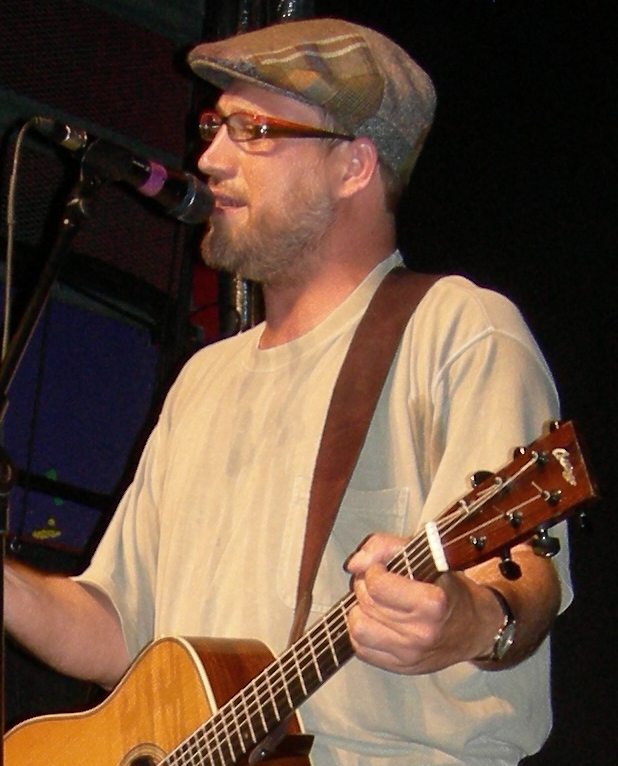
- Wheeler performing solo at the Edinburgh Fringe Festival August 23, 2008

Background information
- Born: John Christopher Wheeler; January 7, 1970 (age 56)
- Origin: Nashville, Tennessee US
- Genres: Folk punk, bluegrass, alternative country
- Occupations: Singer, guitarist, pianist, songwriter, record producer
- Instruments: Vocals, guitar, piano, violin
- Years active: 1995–present
- Labels: Dualtone, Cooking Vinyl, Sony Music, Festival Mushroom, Råtass Records, Koch, Hayseed Dixie Records
- Member of: Hayseed Dixie
- Website: www.johnwheelermusic.com, hayseed-dixie.com

John Wheeler (born January 7, 1970) is an American musician, songwriter and, music producer. While he is best known as the creator and frontman of the internationally-known "rockgrass" band Hayseed Dixie, Wheeler also performs solo and has produced and performed on albums by many other artists. He is the second cousin of bluegrass music pioneer Lester Flatt. An avid motorcycle enthusiast, Wheeler has rode a motorcycle on every tour from 2006 - 2014, logging over 200,000 miles (320,000 kilometers) across Europe and the United States.

== Early life and education ==
Wheeler was born January 7, 1970, in Nashville, Tennessee, the only child of a carpenter and agronomist. Almost entirely self-taught on his instruments, he began playing the piano at the age of 3. His father, having seen him spend hours using a tennis racquet as a pretend guitar, got him an inexpensive Fender acoustic guitar at the age of 7, and he spent much of his childhood teaching himself by playing along to records on his mother's vinyl record player. From 1987-1995 he studied philosophy and history at universities in Tennessee and Wisconsin, paying his way through by playing in several bands which performed on the college music and fraternity party circuits of the time.

== Career ==
Following university, Wheeler returned to Nashville. In 1996, he set up his own recording studio in Nashville where he recorded demos for songwriters and bands as well as his own recording projects. In the summer of 2000, Wheeler had the idea to record an album of AC/DC songs played in a pseudo-bluegrass style. Singing lead and playing fiddle, mandolin and guitar, Wheeler recorded an album originally titled AC/Dixie along with local Nashville bassist Kurt Carrick, dobro player Mike Daly and guitarist Rusty Horn. The unexpected commercial success of this recording on local radio led to a record deal with Nashville-based Dualtone Records, who released the album nationally on April 17, 2001, and to Wheeler forming the band, Hayseed Dixie, in order to perform the project live. The success of the 2001 Hayseed Dixie U.S. tour and the album led to Wheeler continuing with the Hayseed Dixie project through 2018, producing 16 further Hayseed Dixie recordings which have collectively sold over 800,000 copies worldwide and to more than 1,500 live performances in 31 different countries. In March 2003, the band had the unique distinction of having 3 different albums in the top 15 of the bluegrass category of the US Billboard charts at the same time, Wheeler is also the songwriter for the majority of Hayseed Dixie's original songs, including the cult hits "I'm Keeping Your Poop (In a Jar)" and "She Was Skinny When I Met Her."

Currently residing in Cambridge in the UK, Wheeler has recently appeared as a special guest on BBC Radio 2 programs, including The Chris Evans Breakfast Show and Simon Mayo Drivetime. He describes his current musical approach as "acoustic-electric jazz-punk riding on the back of some old-school folk-funk."

Wheeler released a single in November 2012, titled "Deeper in Debt". His first full-length solo album, Un-American Gothic, was released worldwide on February 4, 2013. His second solo album, Difficult #2 Album and containing all original material of a mainly satirical nature, was released on January 29, 2016. An EP of original Southern country-rock drinking songs, titled Daydreams About Night Things was released on January 26, 2018. Wheeler has also since released an album of solo piano renditions of music by Debussy and Satie, as well as an album of piano / vocal versions of AC/DC songs.
