= A Hillbilly Tribute to AC/DC =

Studio album by Hayseed Dixie
- Released: April 17, 2001
- Recorded: 2000
- Genre: Rockgrass
- Label: Dualtone

Hayseed Dixie chronology
A Hillbilly Tribute to AC/DC (2001)	A Hillbilly Tribute to Mountain Love (2002)

Professional ratings
Review scores
Source	Rating
Allmusic	link

A Hillbilly Tribute to AC/DC is the first album by American band Hayseed Dixie, released in 2001 (see 2001 in music). The album consists of cover versions of hard rock AC/DC songs performed in bluegrass style.

== Track listing ==
1. "Highway to Hell" (Bon Scott, Angus Young, Malcolm Young) – 2:27
2. "You Shook Me All Night Long" (Brian Johnson, A. Young, M. Young) – 3:29
3. "Dirty Deeds Done Dirt Cheap" (Scott, A. Young, M. Young) – 2:47
4. "Hell's Bells" (Johnson, A. Young, M. Young) – 3:00
5. "Money Talks" (A. Young, M. Young) – 2:19
6. "Let's Get It Up" (Johnson, A. Young, M. Young) – 3:01
7. "Have a Drink on Me" (Johnson, A. Young, M. Young) – 2:52
8. "T.N.T." (Scott, A. Young, M. Young) – 2:38
9. "Back in Black" (Johnson, A. Young, M. Young) – 3:57
10. "Big Balls" (Scott, A. Young, M. Young) – 2:11

== Charts ==
Chart (2001–03)	Peak position
Australian Albums (ARIA Charts)	59
U.S. Billboard Top Bluegrass Albums	14
U.S. Billboard Top Country Albums	47
