= List of UK Rock & Metal Singles Chart number ones of 2007 =

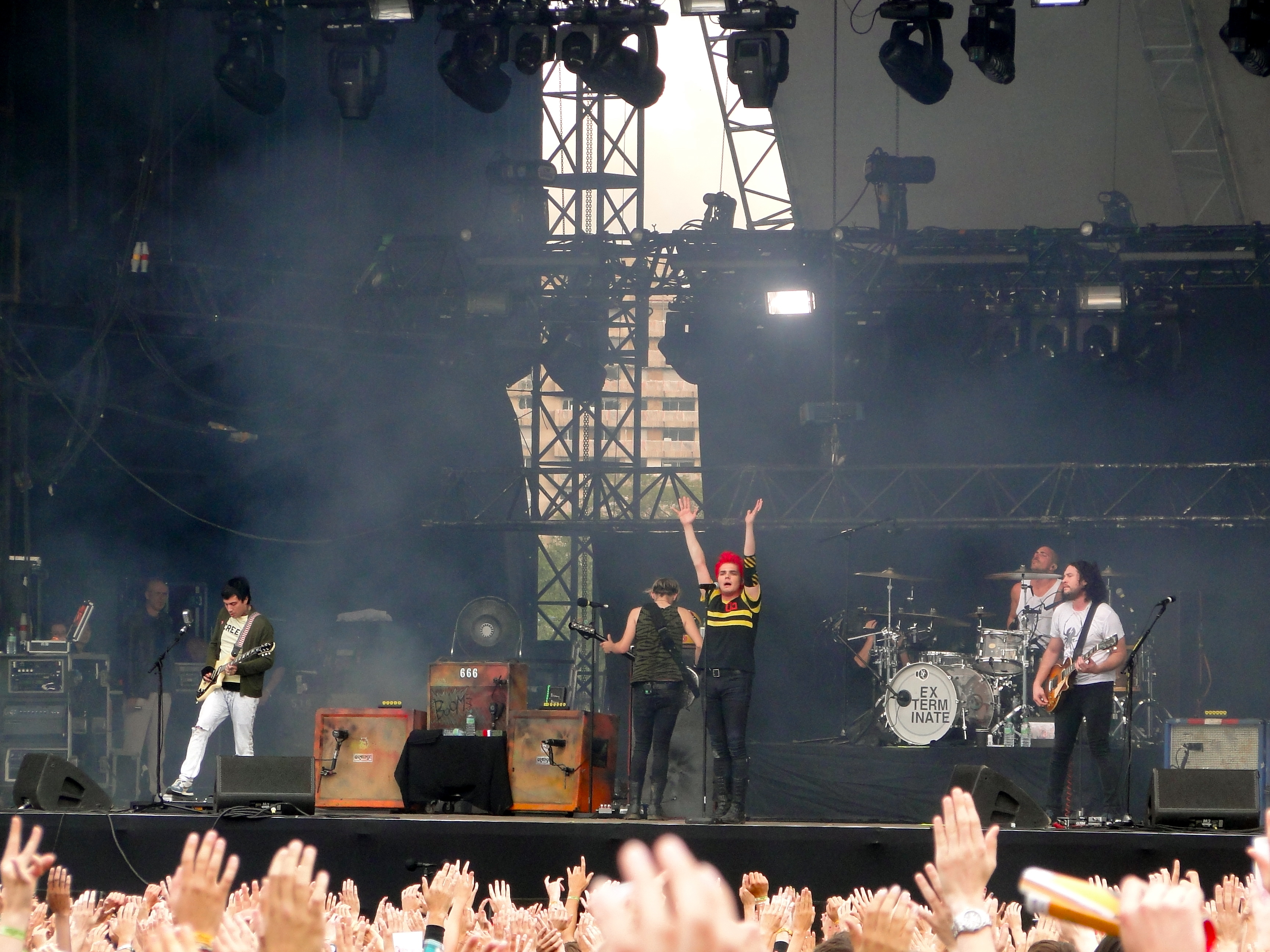
"Famous Last Words" by My Chemical Romance was the longest-running number one of 2007, spending six weeks atop the UK Rock & Metal Singles Chart.

The UK Rock & Metal Singles Chart is a record chart which ranks the best-selling rock and heavy metal songs in the United Kingdom. Compiled and published by the Official Charts Company, the data is based on each track's weekly physical sales, digital downloads and streams. In 2007, there were 22 singles that topped the 52 published charts. The first number-one single of the year was "Different World", the second single from heavy metal band Iron Maiden's 14th studio album A Matter of Life and Death, which spent the first two weeks of the year atop the chart. The final number-one single of the year was "Long Road to Ruin", the second single from American alternative rock band Foo Fighters' sixth studio album Echoes, Silence, Patience & Grace, which spent the last three weeks of 2007 and the first of 2008 at number one.

The most successful song on the UK Rock & Metal Singles Chart in 2007 was "Famous Last Words" by My Chemical Romance, which spent six consecutive weeks at number one early in the year. "Anything Can Happen in the Next Half Hour" by Enter Shikari spent five weeks at number one, while Linkin Park spent a total of five weeks at number one across two releases – "What I've Done" (three weeks) and "Bleed It Out" (two weeks). "Walk Away" by Funeral for a Friend was number one for four weeks, while "Tarantula" by The Smashing Pumpkins, "The Kiss of Dawn" by HIM, "Empty Walls" by Serj Tankian and "Long Road to Ruin" by Foo Fighters were all number one for three weeks. Releases from Iron Maiden, Evanescence, Muse, Lostprophets, Queens of the Stone Age, Nightwish and Gallows each spent two weeks at number one.

== Chart history ==
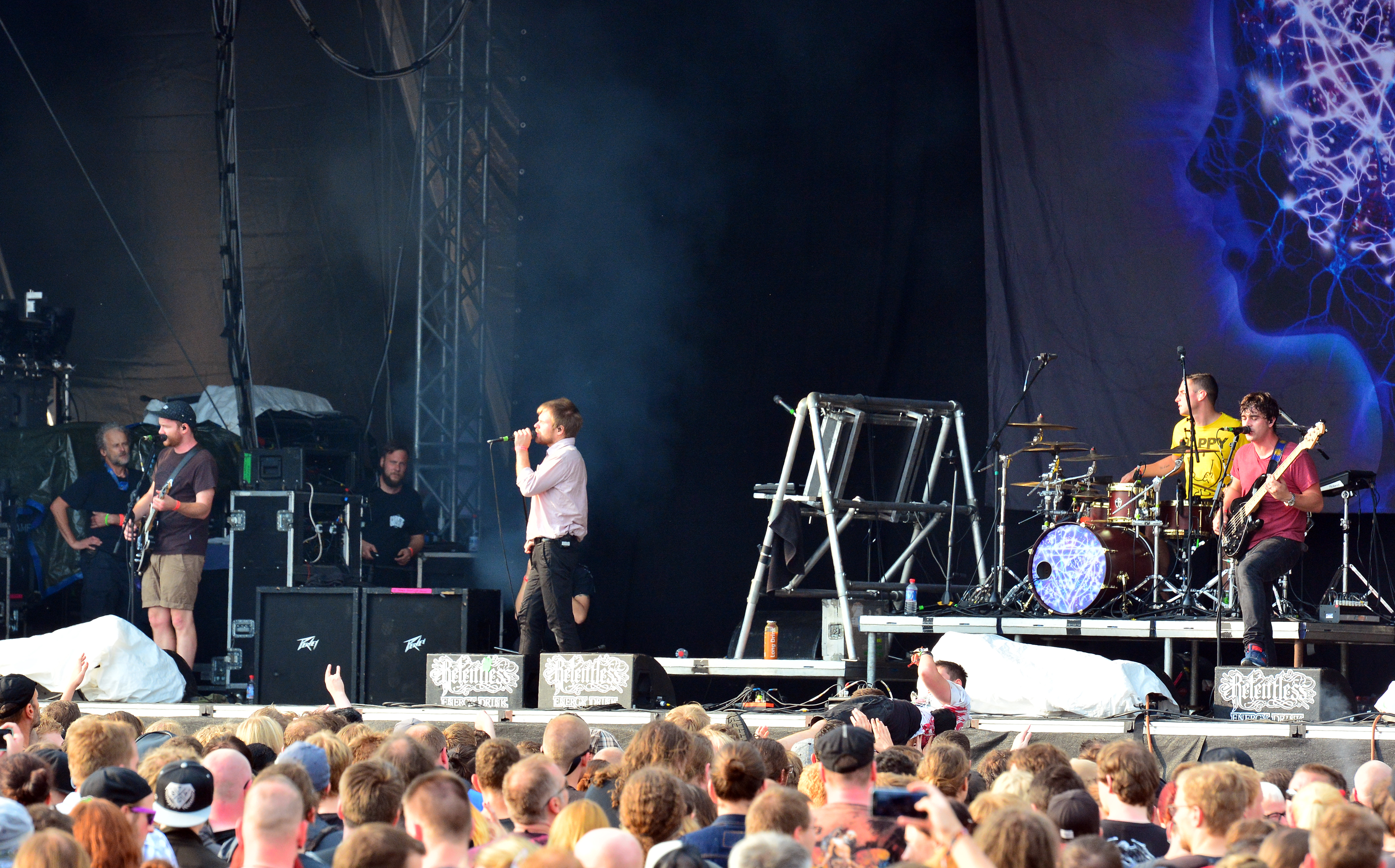
Enter Shikari's "Anything Can Happen in the Next Half Hour" was number one for five consecutive weeks in 2007.

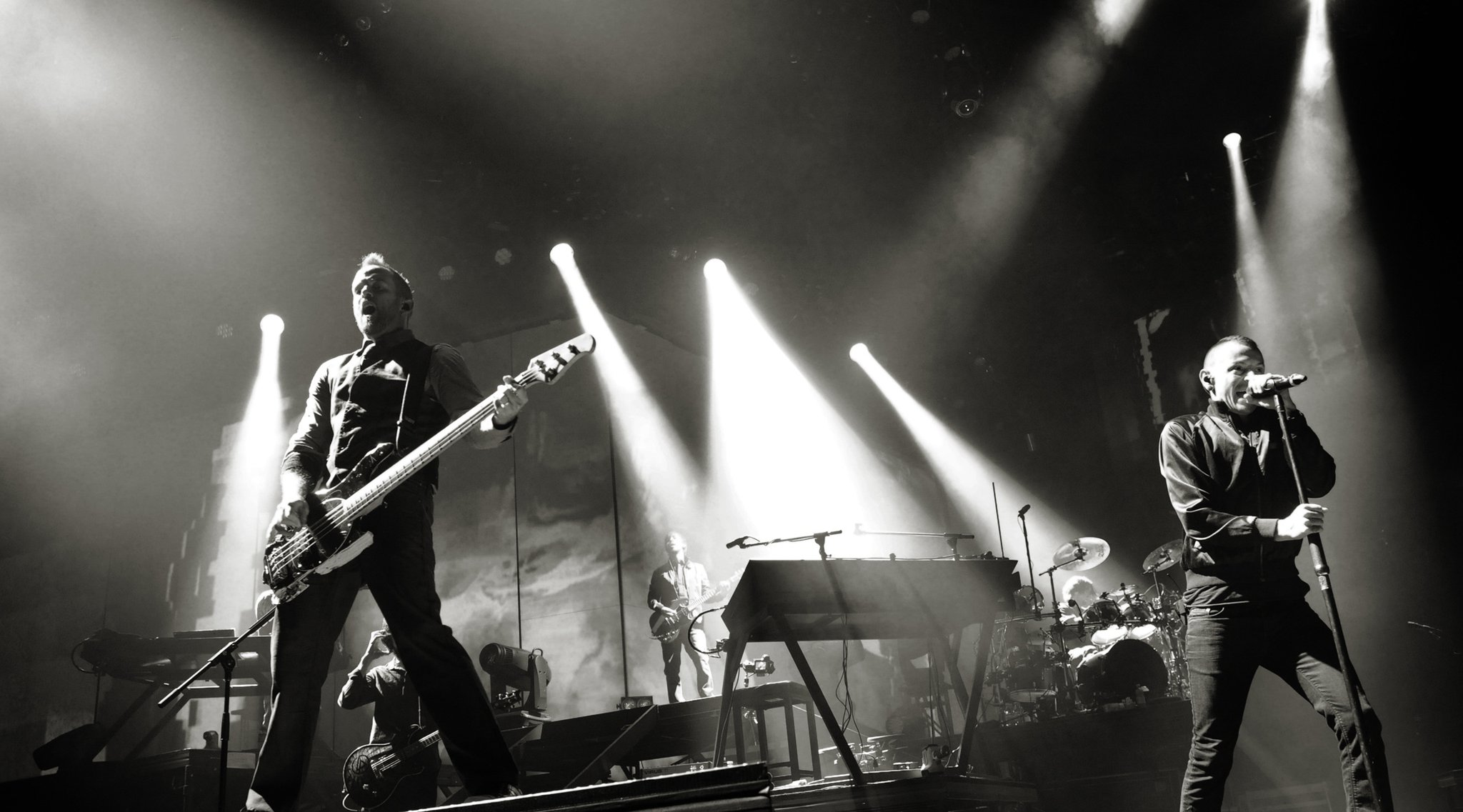
Linkin Park spent five weeks at number one in 2007, topping the chart with "What I've Done" and "Bleed It Out".

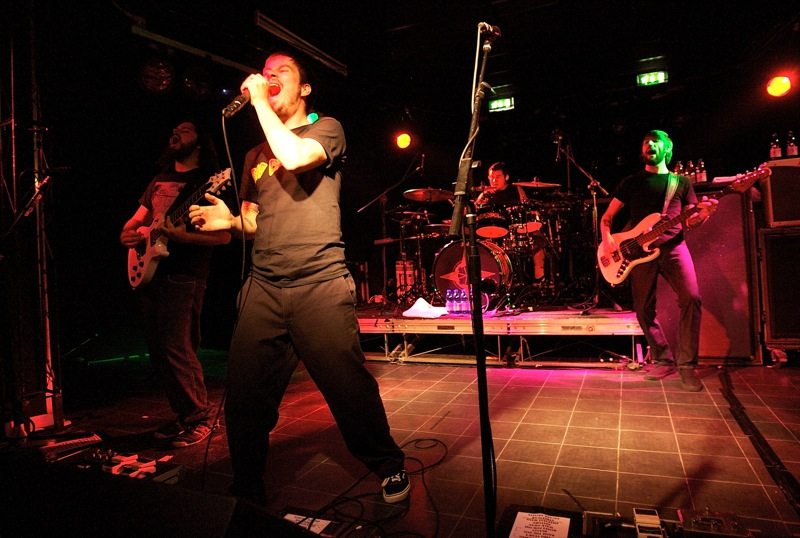
Funeral for a Friend were number one for four weeks with "Walk Away".

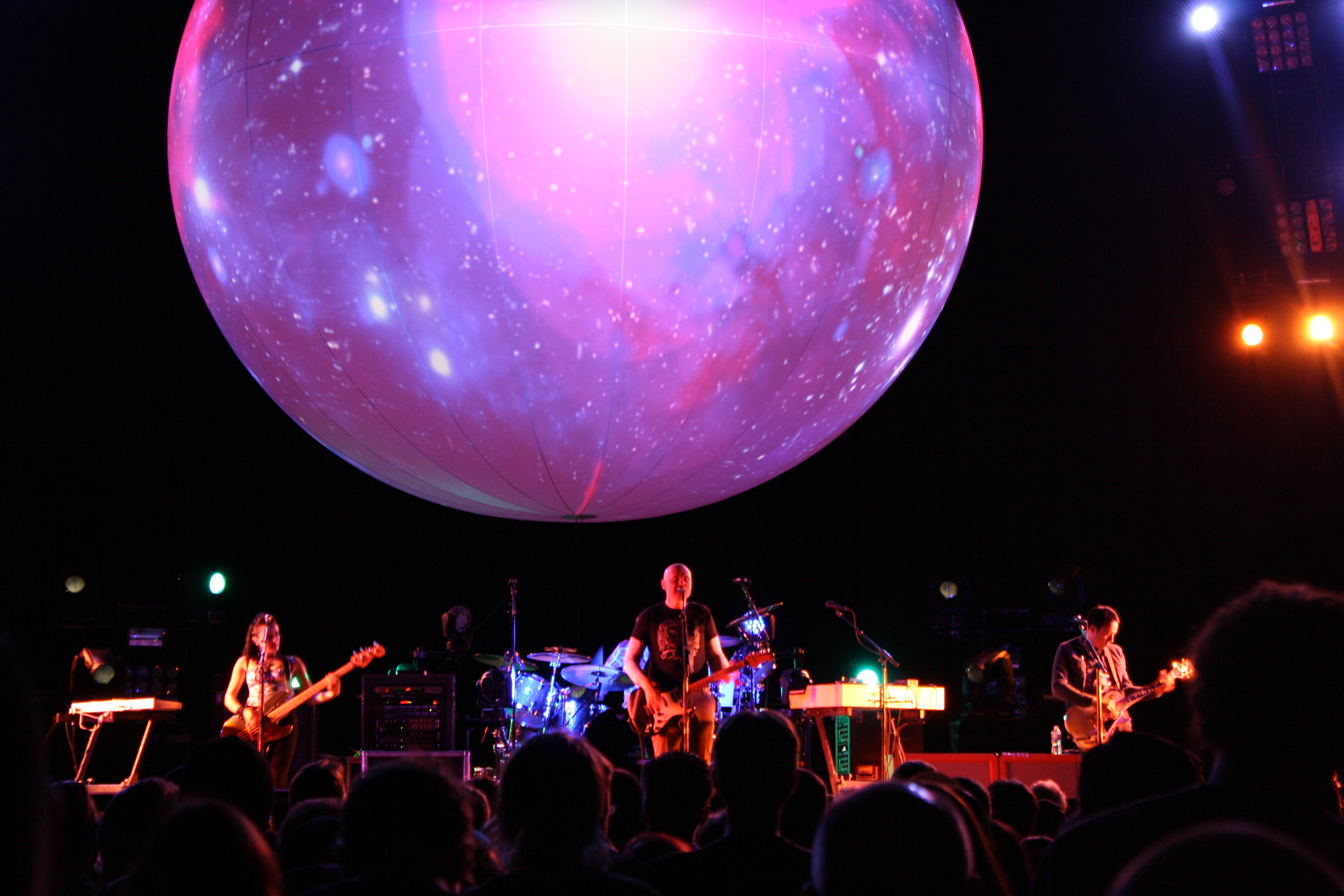
"Tarantula" by The Smashing Pumpkins was number one for three weeks.

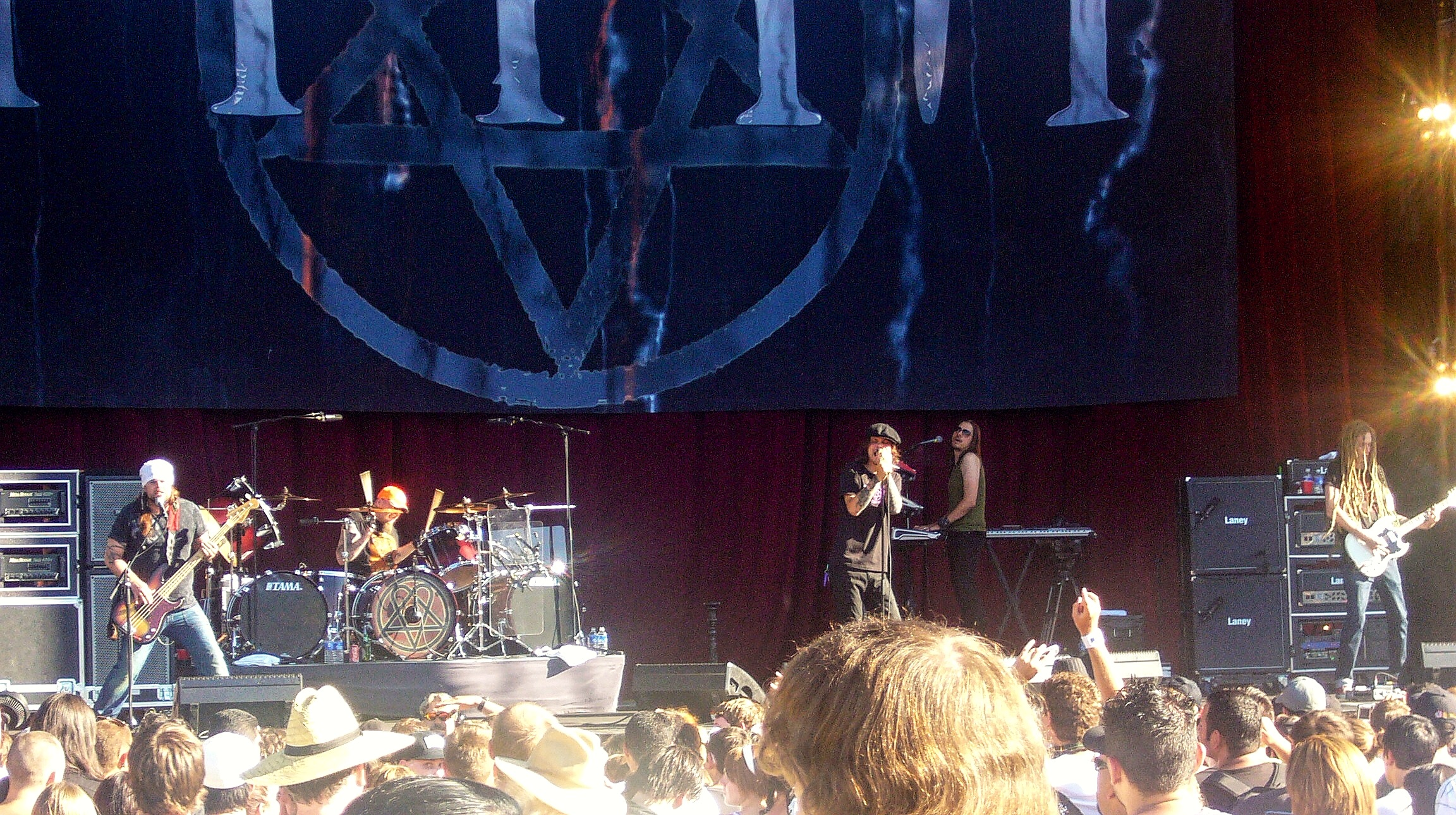
HIM spent three weeks in 2007 at number one with "The Kiss of Dawn".

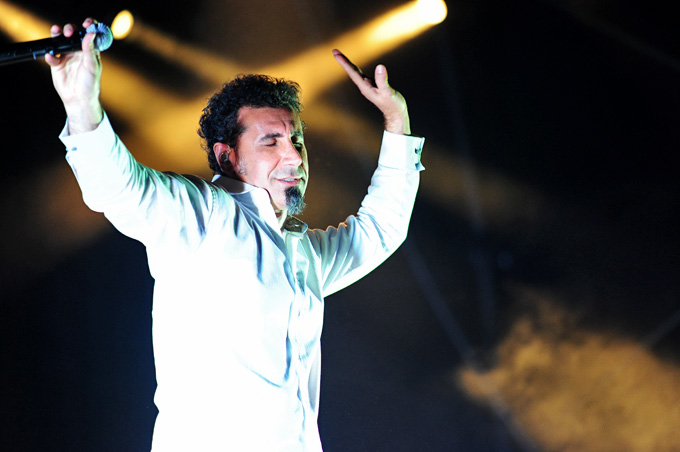
Serj Tankian's "Empty Walls" was number one for three weeks.

| Issue date | Single | Artist(s) | Record label(s) | Ref. |
|---|---|---|---|---|
| 6 January | "Different World" | Iron Maiden | EMI | |
| 13 January | "Different World" | Iron Maiden | EMI | |
| 20 January | "Lithium" | Evanescence | Wind-up | |
| 27 January | "Lithium" | Evanescence | Wind-up | |
| 3 February | "Famous Last Words" | My Chemical Romance | Reprise | |
| 10 February | "Famous Last Words" | My Chemical Romance | Reprise | |
| 17 February | "Famous Last Words" | My Chemical Romance | Reprise | |
| 24 February | "Famous Last Words" | My Chemical Romance | Reprise | |
| 3 March | "Famous Last Words" | My Chemical Romance | Reprise | |
| 10 March | "Famous Last Words" | My Chemical Romance | Reprise | |
| 17 March | "Anything Can Happen in the Next Half Hour" | Enter Shikari | Ambush Reality | |
| 24 March | "Anything Can Happen in the Next Half Hour" | Enter Shikari | Ambush Reality | |
| 31 March | "Anything Can Happen in the Next Half Hour" | Enter Shikari | Ambush Reality | |
| 7 April | "Anything Can Happen in the Next Half Hour" | Enter Shikari | Ambush Reality | |
| 14 April | "Anything Can Happen in the Next Half Hour" | Enter Shikari | Ambush Reality | |
| 21 April | "Invincible" | Muse | Helium 3/Warner Bros. | |
| 28 April | "Invincible" | Muse | Helium 3/Warner Bros. | |
| 5 May | "4:AM Forever" | Lostprophets | Visible Noise | |
| 12 May | "4:AM Forever" | Lostprophets | Visible Noise | |
| 19 May | "What I've Done" | Linkin Park | Warner Bros. | |
| 26 May | "What I've Done" | Linkin Park | Warner Bros. | |
| 2 June | "What I've Done" | Linkin Park | Warner Bros. | |
| 9 June | "Heart-Shaped Glasses (When the Heart; Guides the Hand)" | Marilyn Manson | Interscope | |
| 16 June | "3's & 7's" | Queens of the Stone Age | Interscope | |
| 23 June | "3's & 7's" | Queens of the Stone Age | Interscope | |
| 30 June | "Misery Business" | Paramore | Fueled by Ramen | |
| 7 July | "(You Want to) Make a Memory" | Bon Jovi | Mercury | |
| 14 July | "Tarantula" | The Smashing Pumpkins | Reprise | |
| 21 July | "Tarantula" | The Smashing Pumpkins | Reprise | |
| 28 July | "Tarantula" | The Smashing Pumpkins | Reprise | |
| 4 August | "Walk Away" | Funeral for a Friend | Atlantic | |
| 11 August | "Walk Away" | Funeral for a Friend | Atlantic | |
| 18 August | "Walk Away" | Funeral for a Friend | Atlantic | |
| 25 August | "Walk Away" | Funeral for a Friend | Atlantic | |
| 1 September | "Bleed It Out" | Linkin Park | Warner Bros. | |
| 8 September | "Bleed It Out" | Linkin Park | Warner Bros. | |
| 15 September | "Amaranth" | Nightwish | Nuclear Blast | |
| 22 September | "The Kiss of Dawn" | HIM | Sire | |
| 29 September | "The Kiss of Dawn" | HIM | Sire | |
| 6 October | "Deadly Lethal Ninja Assassin" | Reuben | Hideous | |
| 13 October | "The Kiss of Dawn" | HIM | Sire | |
| 20 October | "Amaranth" | Nightwish | Nuclear Blast | |
| 27 October | "Almost Easy" | Avenged Sevenfold | Warner Bros. | |
| 3 November | "Empty Walls" | Serj Tankian | Reprise | |
| 10 November | "Empty Walls" | Serj Tankian | Reprise | |
| 17 November | "Empty Walls" | Serj Tankian | Reprise | |
| 24 November | "Rockstar" | Nickelback | Roadrunner | |
| 1 December | "Staring at the Rude Bois" | Gallows | Warner Bros. | |
| 8 December | "Staring at the Rude Bois" | Gallows | Warner Bros. | |
| 15 December | "Long Road to Ruin" | Foo Fighters | RCA | |
| 22 December | "Long Road to Ruin" | Foo Fighters | RCA | |
| 29 December | "Long Road to Ruin" | Foo Fighters | RCA | |

== See also ==
- 2007 in British music
- List of UK Rock & Metal Albums Chart number ones of 2007
