= Killer Grass =

Studio album by Hayseed Dixie
- Released: February 2010
- Recorded: Renaissance Recording Studios
- Genre: Bluegrass, comedy rock
- Length: 46 Minutes
- Label: Cooking Vinyl
- Producer: John Wheeler

Hayseed Dixie chronology
| No Covers (2008) | Killer Grass (2010) | Sjt. Munchs Drikkeklubb Band (2011) |

Killer Grass is the 8th full-length studio album by the American band Hayseed Dixie, released in 2010 (see 2010 in music). The CD DVD package contains 7 original compositions along with 6 reinterpretations of previously known songs. The included DVD contains the complete and unedited CD quality individual full resolution (multi-track) audio files for every song on the album, which can be mixed and re-mixed by the user in such computer programs as Garage Band, Logic, Pro Tools, and the like. There is also an additional bonus song, "Love Cabin," which must be mixed by the listener to be heard.

== Track listing ==
1. "Tolerance"
2. "Bohemian Rhapsody" (Queen cover)
3. "Alien Abduction Probe"
4. "Omen" (The Prodigy cover)
5. "In the Backyard"
6. "Eine Kleine Trinkemusik" (Mozart cover)
7. "Norfolk Girl"
8. "She's Just My Type"
9. "Underneath the Bed"
10. "Sabbath Bloody Sabbath" (Black Sabbath cover)
11. "Won't Get Fooled Again" (The Who cover)"
12. "Ramblin' Man" (Hank Williams cover) / "Don't Cry For Me"
