= A Hillbilly Tribute to Mountain Love =

Studio album by Hayseed Dixie
- Released: March 19, 2002
- Genre: Rockgrass
- Label: Dualtone
- Producer: John Wheeler

Hayseed Dixie chronology
A Hillbilly Tribute to AC/DC (2001)	A Hillbilly Tribute to Mountain Love (2002)	Kiss My Grass: A Hillbilly Tribute to Kiss (2003)

Professional ratings
Review scores
Source	Rating
Allmusic	link

A Hillbilly Tribute to Mountain Love is the second album by American band Hayseed Dixie, released in 2002 (see 2002 in music).

== Track listing ==
1. "My Best Friend's Girl" (Ric Ocasek) (The Cars cover) – 2:54
2. "Centerfold" (Seth Justman) (The J. Geils Band cover) – 2:57
3. "Walk This Way" (Joe Perry, Steven Tyler) (Aerosmith cover) – 4:16
4. "Feel Like Making Love" (Mick Ralphs, Paul Rodgers) (Bad Company cover) – 3:45
5. "The Perfect Woman" (Jetton, Wheeler) – 2:53
6. "I Love Rock & Roll" (Jerry Mamberg, Alan Sachs) (Arrows cover) – 2:09
7. "Fat Bottomed Girls" (Brian May) (Queen cover) – 3:07
8. "Big Bottom" (Christopher Guest, Michael McKean, Rob Reiner, Harry Shearer) (Spinal Tap cover) – 3:21
9. "Cat Scratch Fever" (Ted Nugent) (Ted Nugent cover) – 2:43
10. "I'm Keeping Your Poop" (Wheeler) – 2:21

== Personnel ==
- Dale Reno – mandolin
- Don Wayne Reno – banjo
- John Wheeler – bass, violin, acoustic guitar, vocals

== Production ==
- Producer: John Wheeler
- Engineer: John Wheeler
- Design: John Wheeler
- Photography: John Wheeler
- Promoter: Alan Rommelfanger

== Chart performance ==
Chart (2002)	Peak position
U.S. Billboard Top Bluegrass Albums	8
U.S. Billboard Top Country Albums	39
U.S. Billboard Top Heatseekers	38
