= A Hot Piece of Grass =

Studio album by Hayseed Dixie
- Released: June 27, 2005
- Genre: Bluegrass, comedy rock
- Length: 51:53
- Label: Cooking Vinyl
- Producer: John Wheeler

Hayseed Dixie chronology
Let There Be Rockgrass (2004)	A Hot Piece of Grass (2005)	Weapons of Grass Destruction (2007)

Professional ratings
Review scores
Source	Rating
Allmusic	link

A Hot Piece of Grass is the fifth album by American band Hayseed Dixie, released in 2005.

== Track listing ==
1. "Black Dog" (Led Zeppelin cover) – 3:07
2. "War Pigs" (Black Sabbath cover) – 4:27
3. "Holiday" (Green Day cover) – 3:48
4. "Rockin' in the Free World" (Neil Young cover) – 3:39
5. "Whole Lotta Love" (Led Zeppelin cover) – 3:59
6. "Runnin' with the Devil" (Van Halen cover) – 2:44
7. "This Fire" (Franz Ferdinand cover) – 3:24
8. "Roses" (Outkast cover) – 4:35
9. "Blind Beggar Breakdown" – 2:25
10. "Kirby Hill" – 2:25
11. "Uncle Virgil" – 3:00
12. "Mountain Man" – 3:07
13. "Marijuana" (The Reverend Horton Heat cover) – 2:54
14. "Moonshiner's Daughter" – 2:54
15. "Wish I Was You" – 1:59
16. "Dueling Banjos" (Arthur "Guitar Boogie" Smith cover) – 3:13

Many versions also have "Whole Lotta Rosie" (AC/DC cover) and omit "Roses" and "Rockin' In The Free World".
