= Iain Hollingshead =

Iain Hollingshead (born 1980) is a British freelance journalist and novelist.

Iain writes feature articles for a range of publications, The Daily Telegraph in particular. He also wrote a regular column called Loose Ends in Saturday's Guardian. His other work includes fiction, political satire and a musical.

Iain graduated from Cambridge University in 2003 with a first class degree in History. He was runner-up in the Guardian Student Media Awards as Columnist of the Year.

Iain is currently working as a History and Politics teacher at Dulwich College.

== Works ==
His first novel, Twenty Something: The Quarter-life Crisis of Jack Lancaster was published in 2006 by Gerald Duckworth and Company Ltd. The book won him the infamous literary Bad Sex in Fiction Award, which he accepted in person announcing "I hope to win it every year". He is the youngest author to have won the somewhat dubious honour. This book has also been translated into Vietnamese by Le Thu Thuy, under the title "Tung qua tuoi hai muoi tong mui shacs sli now", and was well received by young Vietnamese readers. Overall the novel was well received, drawing critics' comparison with Sue Townsend, Helen Fielding and Tony Parsons.

Iain wrote the book and lyrics for the satirical musical Blair on Broadway, first performed in October 2007 at the Hen and Chickens Theatre in Highbury. The show's critical reception, which included reviews in The Daily Telegraph, The Guardian and The Stage, was mixed, with descriptions ranging from "a show that packs some punch" (The Telegraph) to "toothless spoof" (The Guardian). The show proved popular with audiences, with the initial run selling out.

Iain devised and edited the Telegraph's "Am I Alone in Thinking...?" series of unpublished letters to the editor, which has run for over a decade and sold more than 300,000 copies.

His recent book include Boris Johnson: The Neverending Tory, a well-received spoof published by Penguin in 2022, and a collaboration with Goalhanger on 'The Rest is History', a Sunday Times bestseller published by Bloomsbury in 2024.

== Awards ==
Iain was listed as one of the E.S. Magazine's top '50 Brit Young Things' of 2006.

== See also ==
- Quarter-life crisis
