= Kiss My Grass: A Hillbilly Tribute to Kiss =

Kiss My Grass – A Hillbilly Tribute to Kiss

Studio album by Hayseed Dixie
- Released: February 18, 2003
- Genre: Rockgrass
- Length: 34:31
- Label: Dualtone

Hayseed Dixie chronology
A Hillbilly Tribute to Mountain Love (2002)	Kiss My Grass – A Hillbilly Tribute to Kiss (2003)	Let There Be Rockgrass (2004)

Professional ratings
Review scores
Source	Rating
AllMusic	2.5/5 stars

Kiss My Grass: A Hillbilly Tribute to Kiss is the third album by American band Hayseed Dixie, released in 2003. The album consists entirely of covers of songs by the hard rock band Kiss performed in the bluegrass style.

== Track listing ==
1. "Calling Dr. Love" (Gene Simmons) – 2:54
2. "Detroit Rock City" (Bob Ezrin, Paul Stanley) – 4:10
3. "Christine Sixteen" (Simmons) – 3:10
4. "Cold Gin" (Ace Frehley) – 3:53
5. "Let's Put the X in Sex" (Desmond Child, Stanley) – 3:22
6. "Love Gun" (Stanley) – 3:25
7. "Lick It Up" (Vinnie Vincent, Stanley) – 3:16
8. "I Love It Loud" (Vincent, Simmons) – 3:34
9. "Rock and Roll All Nite" (Simmons, Stanley) – 2:49
10. "Heaven's on Fire" (Child, Stanley) – 3:58

== Charts ==
Album - Billboard (United States)

Year	Chart	Position
2003	Top Country Albums	52
2003	Top Bluegrass Albums	4
