= Hayseed Dixie =

American bluegrass band

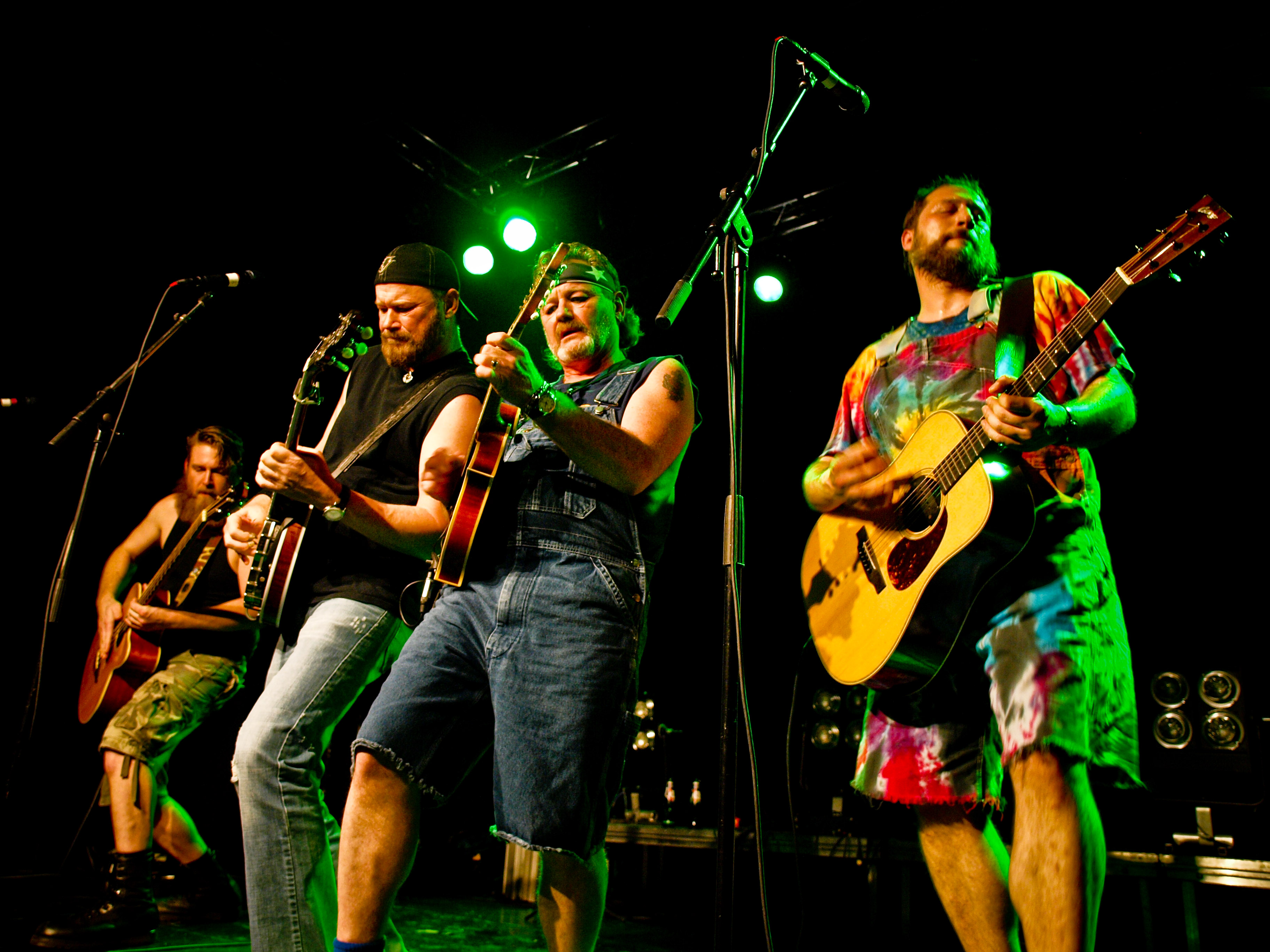
- Hayseed Dixie performing in Stavanger, Norway, 2008

Background information
- Also known as: Kerosene Brothers
- Origin: United States
- Genres: Rockgrass; parody; bluegrass; comedy rock
- Years active: 2001–present
- Labels: Dualtone; Cooking Vinyl; Festival Mushroom; Råtass Records; Cargo Records
- Members: John Wheeler aka Barley Scotch; Jake "Bakesnake" Byers; Hippy Joe Hymas; Tim Carter (on hiatus); Rich Collins
- Past members: Kurt Carrick; Mike Daly; Rusty Horn; Jeff Williams; Chad Mize; Dave Harrison; Nick Buda; Don Wayne Reno; Dale Reno; Jason D Smith
- Website: www.hayseed-dixie.com

Hayseed Dixie is an American band formed in Nashville, Tennessee, in 2000. Their first album was A Hillbilly Tribute to AC/DC. The band performs bluegrass cover versions of hard rock songs and also original songs of a mostly satirical or absurdist nature in a self-created musical genre which the band calls "rockgrass." The band's name is a linguistic play on the name of the band AC/DC.

== Career ==
Hayseed Dixie plays hard rock and bluegrass music on electrified acoustic bluegrass instruments. The band has released 16 studio albums and played over 1,400 live dates in 31 different countries since its inception in 2000.

Upon the release of the debut album, A Hillbilly Tribute to AC/DC, on April 17, 2001, which consisted of acoustic hillbilly-styled reworkings of AC/DC songs, Hayseed Dixie received considerable morning-show radio airplay in the US, selling over 250,000 albums in the US from 2001 to 2003. The band toured the US club and festival circuit extensively during that time. In March 2003, the band had three different albums in the Top 15 in the bluegrass category of the US Billboard charts at the same time. Western Europe, however, has shown the group the most enduring appreciation.

Since 2001, the band has produced 15 further themed albums in the "rockgrass" style, composed of both hillbilly-esque reworkings of classic rock songs and original material which is mainly satirical in nature.

Hayseed Dixie has performed at major European folk and rock music festivals, including an appearance opening the main stage at Glastonbury in 2005. In September 2005 they held their own festival, called Loopallu, in the small coastal town of Ullapool, Scotland, which has since become an annual event, though they are no longer involved with it.

In June 2007 Hayseed Dixie appeared on the opening day of the Download Festival and played at the Roskilde Festival in Denmark in July 2007. In October 2010, the band played a four-night stand called Hayfest: Tour of Glasgow, Scotland performing four consecutive themed nights (drinking, cheating, killing and hell songs respectively) in the Scottish city with no songs repeated, thus playing over eight hours of music in four nights. Hayseed Dixie made a three-consecutive-night appearance at the Wacken Open Air Festival in Germany in 2011, playing three entirely different sets of material each night.

Hayseed Dixie released an album on April 11, 2011, composed almost entirely of songs in the Norwegian language, titled Sjt Munchs Drikkeklubb Band. The group also charted a single in the summer of 2011 in Finland called "Juodaan Viinaa," (a cover version of a song by Finnish musician Hector) which loosely translates to "Let's Drink Booze!" sung entirely in Finnish. Hayseed Dixie have also recorded several songs in German, among them a cover of Rammstein's "Mein Teil" and an original drinking song called "Die Richtige Zeit für Schwarzbier," (English translation: "The Right Time for Black Beer") as well as one song in Spanish. With the exception of the 2006 Halloween EP, You Wanna See Something REALLY Scary? which was recorded in Scotland, all of Hayseed Dixie's albums have been recorded by John Wheeler at Renaissance Recording, Nashville, Tennessee, entirely in the analogue recording format.

BBC Radio 2's Jeremy Vine is a fan of their work and originally championed them at national radio in the UK. The group wrote and recorded the "When you wanna hear great music..." jingle for his daily radio show. They also performed twice in 2005 on the BBC Television show Top of the Pops and on the 2014 Jools Holland's Hootenanny on New Year's Eve.

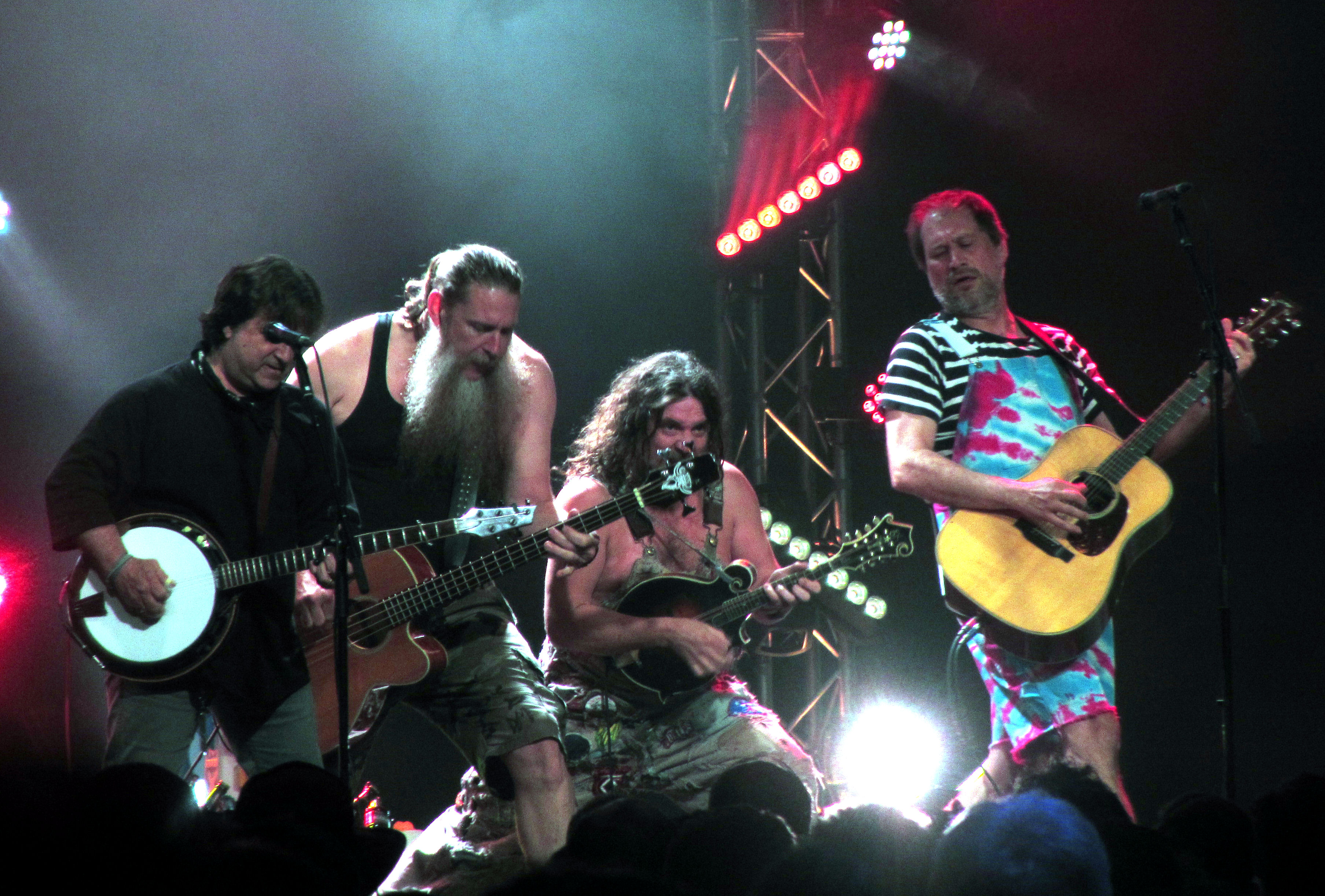
Hayseed Dixie at the Cambridge Folk Festival, 30 July 2017 - left to right: Tim Carter, Jake "Bakesnake" Byers, Hippy Joe Hymas, John Wheeler

Kerosene Brothers was an alter-ego project of the band; they released the album Choose Your Own Title under that name in 2003 on Koch Records. John Wheeler has released two solo albums on the Cooking Vinyl label, the first titled Un-American Gothic, in February 2013, and the second, titled "Difficult #2 Album," in January 2016, as well as an EP of southern rock songs, titled Daydreams About Night Things, in January 2018.

Longtime mainstay members, Dale Reno and Don Wayne Reno, left Hayseed Dixie at the end of 2013 to form a traditional bluegrass group called Reno and Harrell, which released an album called Reno Bound in September 2013. Joining Hayseed Dixie in January 2014 in the roles of banjo and mandolin were Johnny Butten (holder of the Guinness world record title for fastest banjo player) and Hippy Joe Hymas. In 2018, Hymas appeared in the documentary New Town Utopia.

The studio album Hair Down to My Grass was released on January 12, 2015, worldwide and spent three weeks at the number one spot on the UK Country Chart. The band launched the new album in the UK with a performance of "Eye of the Tiger" on Jools' Annual Hootenanny New Year's Eve BBC television show.

A new album, titled Free Your Mind and Your Grass Will Follow was released in April 2017.

In 2020, the band released Blast From the Grassed and in 2021, an album of original, outlaw country oriented songs, Shattered Grass.

== Band members ==
=== Current ===
- John Wheeler (credited as Barley Scotch) – vocals, acoustic guitar, violin, mandolin, piano
- Hippy Joe Hymas – mandolin, acoustic guitar
- Jake "Bakesnake" Byers – acoustic bass guitar
- Richard Collins- banjo

=== Former ===
- Tim Carter - banjo
- Rusty Horn (as Cooter Brown) – acoustic guitar
- Kurt Carrick (as Kletus) – acoustic bass
- Mike Daly (as Wilson Cook) – Dobro
- Jason D Smith – bass
- Jeff Williams – bass
- Chad Mize – bass
- Dave Harrison - percussion
- Nick Buda - percussion
- Don Wayne Reno - banjo
- Dale Reno - mandolin
- Johnny Butten – banjo

== Discography ==
Title	Album details	Peak chart positions				
Title	Album details	US Grass	US Country	US Heat	UK Country	Australia Country
A Hillbilly Tribute to AC/DC	Release date: 17 April 2001; Label: Dualtone Records	1	47	—	—	59
A Hillbilly Tribute to Mountain Love	Release date: 19 March 2002; Label: Dualtone Records	8	39	38	—	—
Kiss My Grass: A Hillbilly Tribute to Kiss	Release date: 18 February 2003; Label: Dualtone Records	4	52	—	—	—
Let There Be Rockgrass	Release date: 2 August 2004; Label: Cooking Vinyl	—	—	—	1	—
A Hot Piece of Grass	Release date: 27 June 2005; Label: Cooking Vinyl	6	—	—	1	—
You Wanna See Something REALLY Scary? (EP)	Release date: 23 October 2006; Label: Cooking Vinyl	—	—	—	—	—
Weapons of Grass Destruction	Release date: 9 April 2007; Label: Cooking Vinyl	—	—	—	1	—
No Covers	Release date: 18 February 2008; Label: Cooking Vinyl	—	—	—	—	—
Killer Grass	Release date: 23 February 2010; Label: Cooking Vinyl	—	—	—	3	—
Sjt. Munchs Drikkeklubb Band	Release date: 15 April 2011; Label: Råtass Records	—	—	—	—	—
Nicotine and Alcohol	Release date: 15 April 2012; Label: Hayseed Dixie Records	—	—	—	—	—
Grasswhoopin' Party Pack, Vol.1	Release date: 12 August 2013; Label: Hayseed Dixie Records	—	—	—	—	—
Grasswhoopin' Party Pack, Vol.2	Release date: 19 August 2013; Label: Hayseed Dixie Records	—	—	—	—	—
Hair Down To My Grass	Release date: 12 January 2015; Label: Hayseed Dixie Records	—	—	—	1	—
Free Your Mind and Your Grass Will Follow	Release date: 14 April 2017; Label: Hayseed Dixie Records / Cargo Records	—	—	—	1	—
Blast From the Grassed	Release date: 14 February 2020; Label: Hayseed Dixie Records / Cargo Records	14	—	—	6	—
Shattered Grass	Release date: 29 October 2021; Label: Hayseed Dixie Records	—	—	—	—	—
Rockgrass Outlaws	Release date: 2026; Label: Hayseed Dixie Records	—	—	—	—	—
"—" denotes releases that did not chart

=== Videography ===
- 2006: No Sleep Till Liverpool (DVD) – A 2005 concert tour to support A Hot Piece of Grass. Includes a cover of AC/DC's "Hells Bells", several music videos and a segment about the origins of the band.

== Other sources ==
- Dave Simpson (2005-07-27). "Southern fried metal". Guardian Unlimited.
- "Hayseed Dixie". The Age. 2005-10-07.
- Troy Carpenter (2003-01-14). "Billboard Bits: Bob Dylan, Hayseed Dixie, Men At Work". Billboard.
