= Blair on Broadway =

2007 musical by Timothy Muller and Iain Hollingshead

- Logo
- Music: Timothy Muller
- Lyrics: Iain Hollingshead
- Book: Iain Hollingshead
- Basis: The political career of Tony Blair
- Productions: 2007 — Hen and Chickens Theatre, Highbury; 2008 — Arts Theatre, West End

Blair on Broadway is a satirical musical based on the political career (from 1997 to 2007) of former British Prime Minister Tony Blair. The words and lyrics were written by journalist and novelist Iain Hollingshead, with music by journalist Timothy Muller.

== Original production ==
Blair on Broadway opened at Highbury's Hen and Chickens Theatre on 25 October 2007. The show's critical reception, which included reviews in The Daily Telegraph, The Guardian and The Stage, was mixed, with descriptions ranging from "a show that packs some punch" (The Telegraph) to "toothless spoof" (The Guardian). The show proved popular with audiences, with the initial run selling out.

On November 18, 2007, a charity gala performance of the show was staged at the Arts Theatre, off Leicester Square in the West End. The evening was hosted by Derek Jacobi in aid of the charity Children of Peace, and featured a brief cameo appearance from journalist Matthew Parris.

== Arts Theatre production ==
The show returned to the Arts Theatre for three weeks in January 2008, in a reduced one-hour format with no interval. The run saw more cameos from well-known politicians and journalists, including MPs Bob Marshall-Andrews and Lembit Opik, former reporter and independent MP Martin Bell, author and broadcaster Melvyn Bragg, human rights activist Peter Tatchell, and journalists Rod Liddle, Polly Toynbee, and Andrew Rawnsley.
