= List of UK Rock & Metal Albums Chart number ones of 2007 =

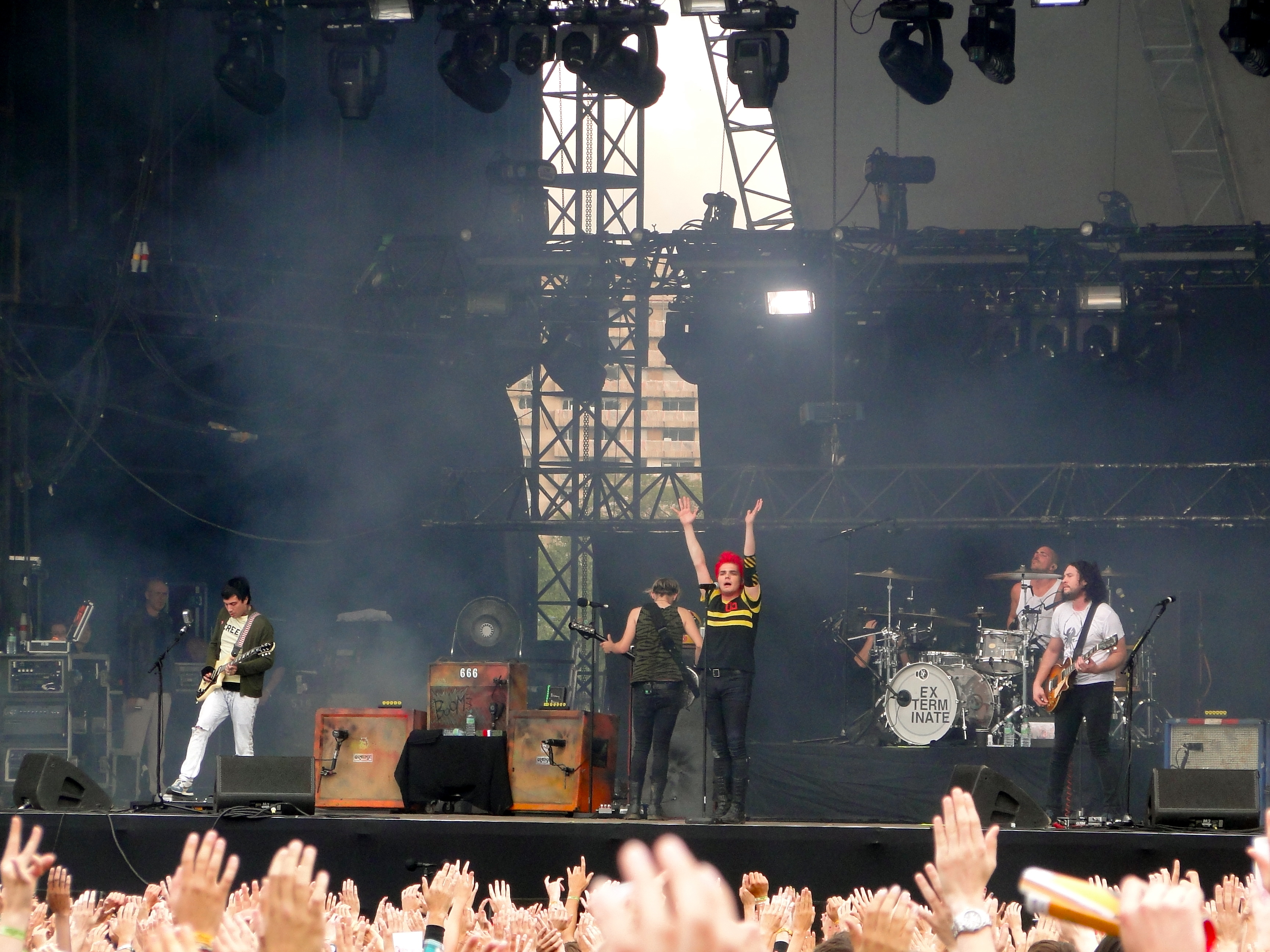
My Chemical Romance's third studio album The Black Parade was the longest-running number-one album of 2007, spending seven weeks atop the chart.

The UK Rock & Metal Albums Chart is a record chart which ranks the best-selling rock and heavy metal albums in the United Kingdom. Compiled and published by the Official Charts Company, the data is based on each album's weekly physical sales, digital downloads and streams. In 2007, there were 21 albums that topped the 52 published charts. The first number-one album of the year was Muse's fourth studio album Black Holes and Revelations, released the previous year, which spent the first three weeks of the year at number one. The first new number-one of the year was Chimaira's fourth studio album Resurrection, in March. The final number-one album of the year was the Led Zeppelin's compilation album Mothership, which spent the last six weeks of 2007 and the first week of 2008 at the top of the chart.

The most successful album on the UK Rock & Metal Albums Chart in 2007 was My Chemical Romance's third studio album The Black Parade, which spent a total of seven weeks at number one over three separate spells. Echoes, Silence, Patience & Grace, the sixth studio album by Foo Fighters, spent six weeks at number one and was the best-selling rock and metal album of the year, ranking 15th in the UK End of Year Albums Chart. Led Zeppelin's Mothership also spent six weeks at number one during the year, while Linkin Park's Minutes to Midnight spent five and Muse's Black Holes and Revelations spent four. Paramore's Riot! was number one for three weeks in 2007, while six more albums – Stadium Arcadium, Take to the Skies, Year Zero, Snakes & Arrows, Lost Highway and Libertad – each spent two weeks at number one.

== Chart history ==
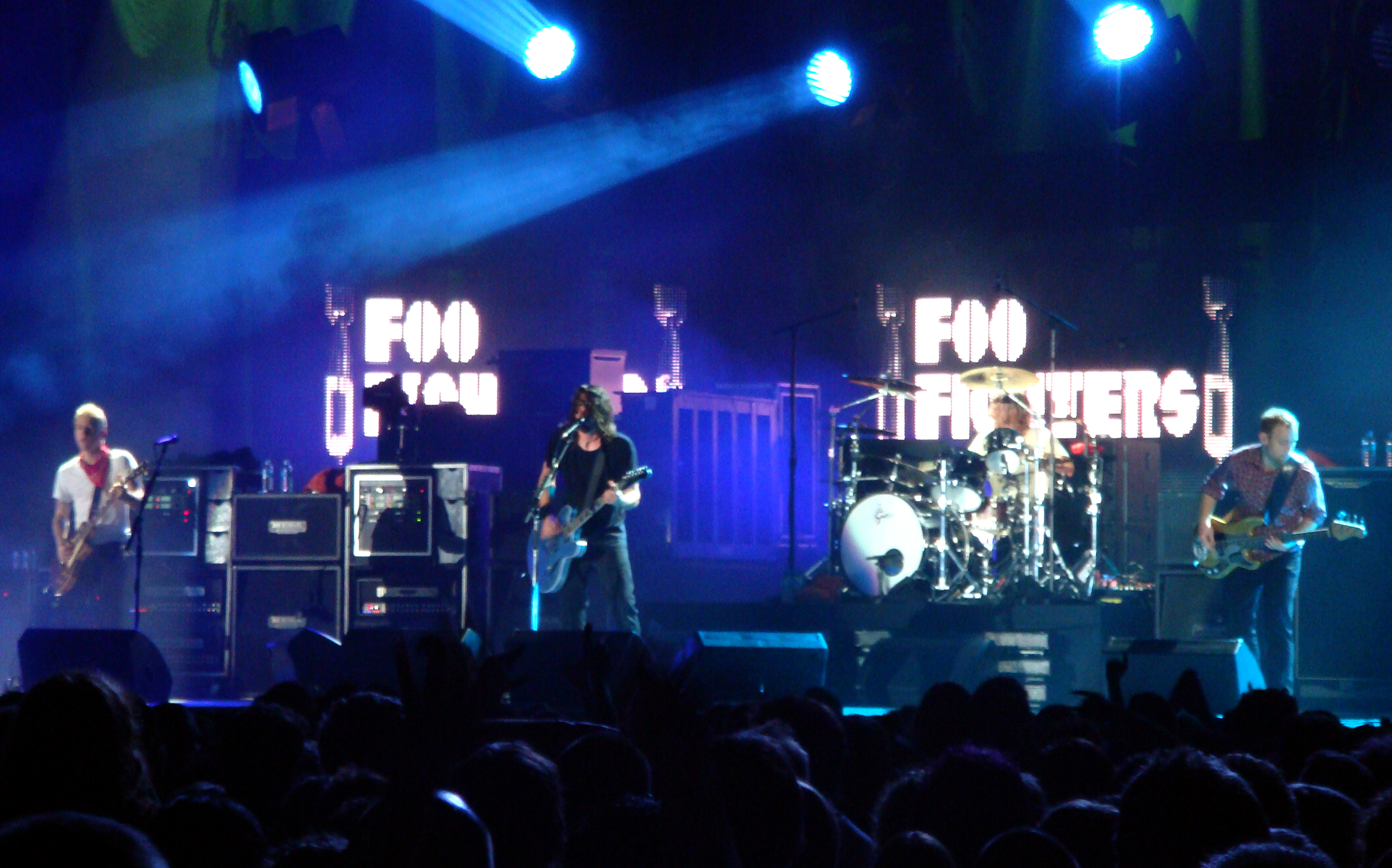
Echoes, Silence, Patience & Grace by Foo Fighters spent six weeks at number one in 2007 and was the best-selling rock and metal album of the year in the UK. The band's previous album In Your Honor was also number one for a week in 2007.

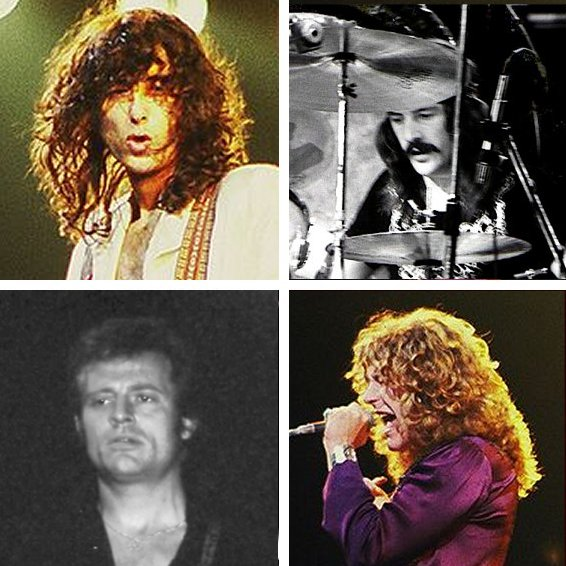
Led Zeppelin's compilation Mothership spent the last six weeks of 2007 at number one on the chart.

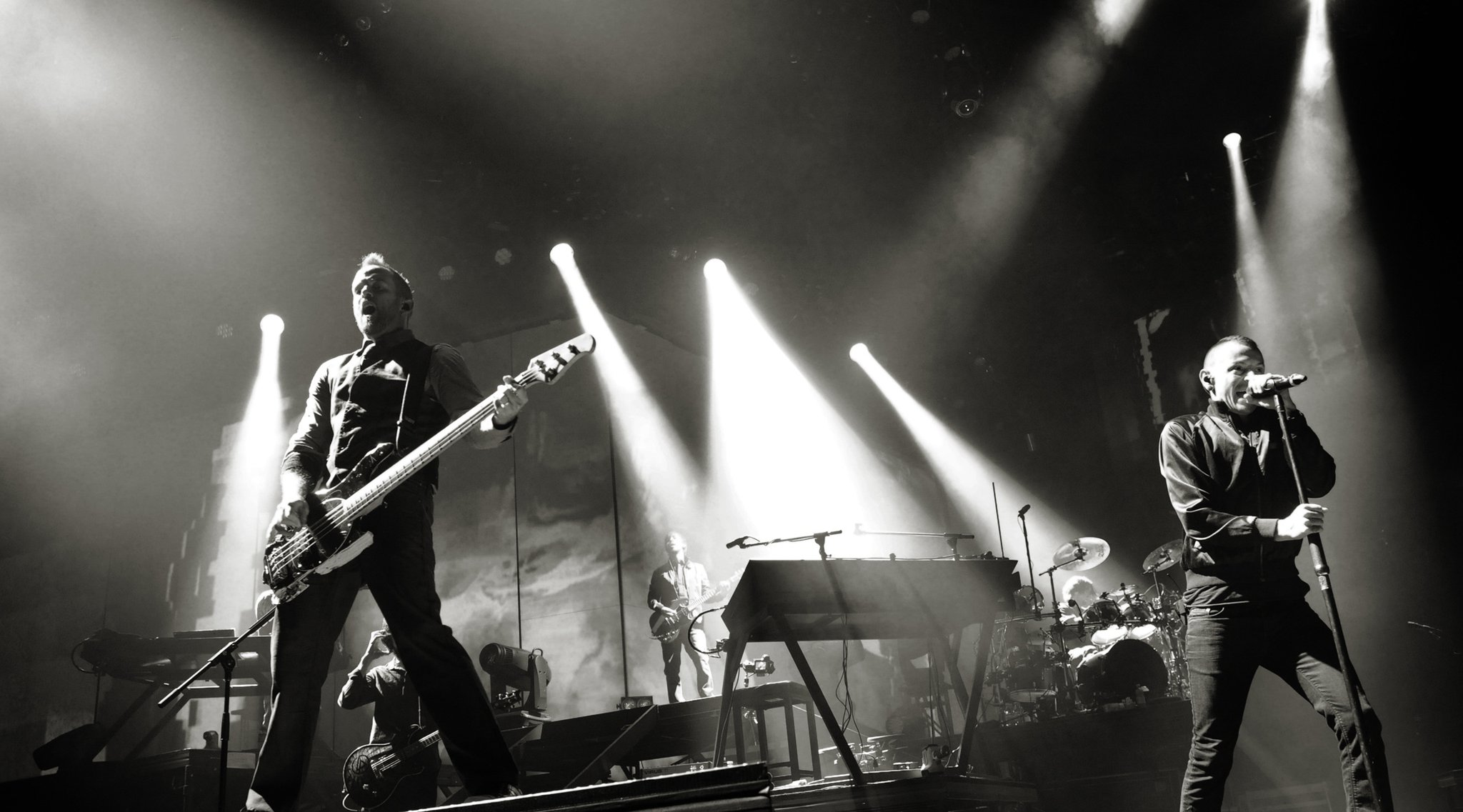
Linkin Park were number one on the UK Rock & Metal Albums Chart for five weeks in 2007 with Minutes to Midnight.

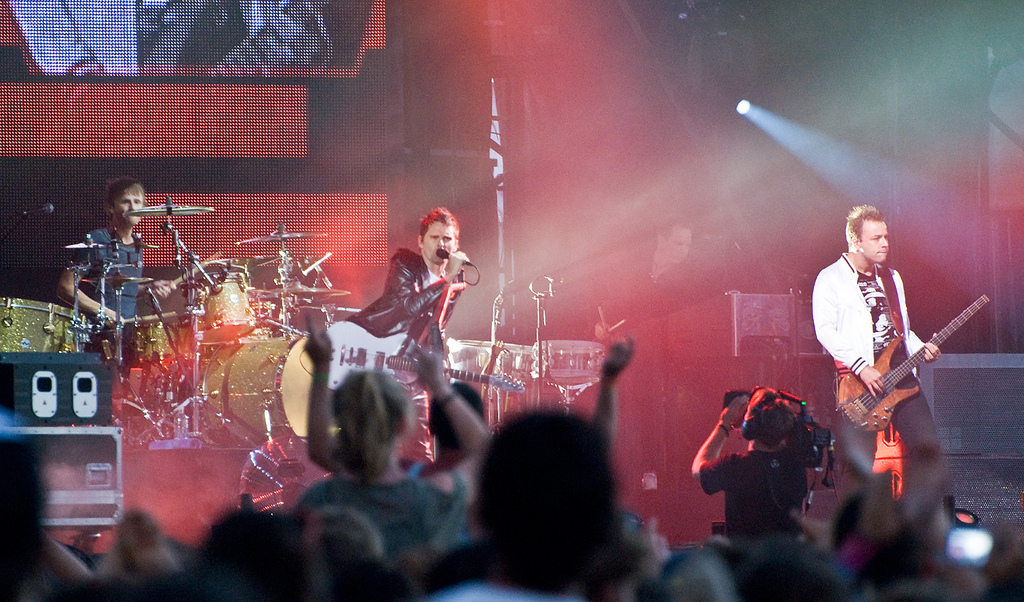
Muse's fourth studio album Black Holes and Revelations returned to number one for four weeks during 2007.

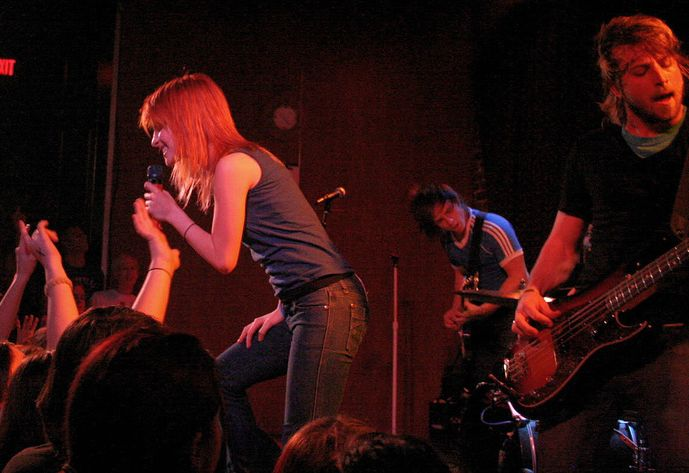
Paramore's third studio album Riot! spent three weeks at number one.

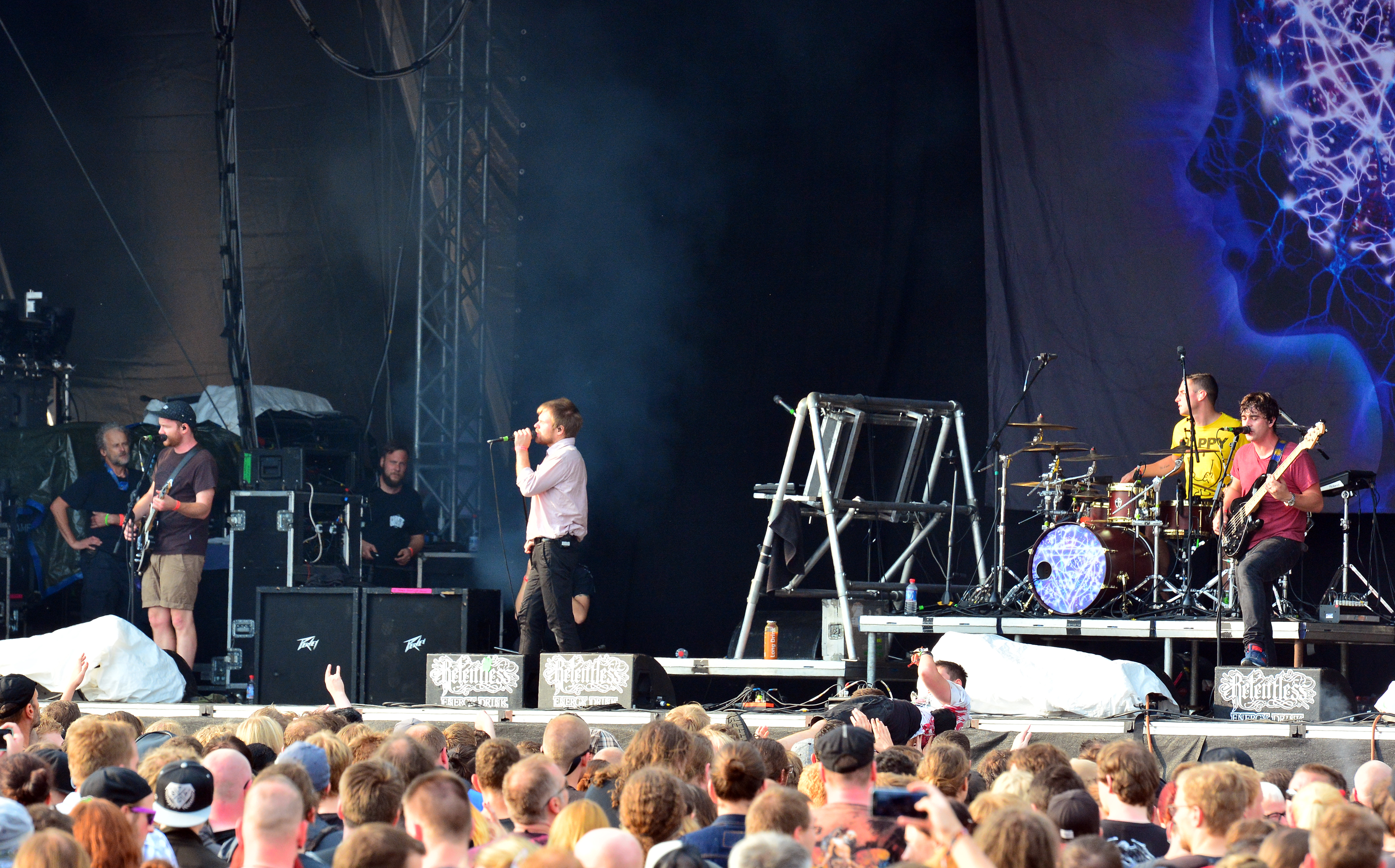
Enter Shikari's Take to the Skies was number one for two weeks in 2007.

Key
†	Indicates best-selling rock album of 2007

Issue date	Album	Artist(s)	Record label(s)	Ref.
6 January	Black Holes and Revelations	Muse	Helium 3/Warner Bros.	
13 January	Black Holes and Revelations	Muse	Helium 3/Warner Bros.	
20 January	Black Holes and Revelations	Muse	Helium 3/Warner Bros.	
27 January	The Black Parade	My Chemical Romance	Warner Bros.	
3 February	The Black Parade	My Chemical Romance	Warner Bros.	
10 February	The Black Parade	My Chemical Romance	Warner Bros.	
17 February	The Black Parade	My Chemical Romance	Warner Bros.	
24 February	Stadium Arcadium	Red Hot Chili Peppers	Warner Bros.	
3 March	Stadium Arcadium	Red Hot Chili Peppers	Warner Bros.	
10 March	Black Holes and Revelations	Muse	Helium 3/Warner Bros.	
17 March	Resurrection	Chimaira	Nuclear Blast	
24 March	The Heart of Everything	Within Temptation	Roadrunner	
31 March	Take to the Skies	Enter Shikari	Ambush Reality	
7 April	The Blackening	Machine Head	Roadrunner	
14 April	Take to the Skies	Enter Shikari	Ambush Reality	
21 April	The Black Parade	My Chemical Romance	Warner Bros.	
28 April	Year Zero	Nine Inch Nails	Interscope	
5 May	Year Zero	Nine Inch Nails	Interscope	
12 May	Snakes & Arrows	Rush	Atlantic	
19 May	Snakes & Arrows	Rush	Atlantic	
26 May	Minutes to Midnight	Linkin Park	Warner Bros.	
2 June	Minutes to Midnight	Linkin Park	Warner Bros.	
9 June	Minutes to Midnight	Linkin Park	Warner Bros.	
16 June	Eat Me, Drink Me	Marilyn Manson	Interscope	
23 June	Lost Highway	Bon Jovi	Mercury	
30 June	Lost Highway	Bon Jovi	Mercury	
7 July	Riot!	Paramore	Fueled by Ramen	
14 July	Libertad	Velvet Revolver	RCA	
21 July	Libertad	Velvet Revolver	RCA	
28 July	The Black Parade	My Chemical Romance	Warner Bros.	
4 August	The Black Parade	My Chemical Romance	Warner Bros.	
11 August	Untitled	Korn	Virgin	
18 August	Riot!	Paramore	Fueled by Ramen	
25 August	Riot!	Paramore	Fueled by Ramen	
1 September	Conviction	Aiden	Victory	
8 September	Minutes to Midnight	Linkin Park	Warner Bros.	
15 September	Minutes to Midnight	Linkin Park	Warner Bros.	
22 September	In Your Honor	Foo Fighters	RCA	
29 September	Venus Doom	HIM	Sire	
6 October	Echoes, Silence, Patience & Grace	Foo Fighters	RCA	
13 October	Echoes, Silence, Patience & Grace	Foo Fighters	RCA	
20 October	Echoes, Silence, Patience & Grace	Foo Fighters	RCA	
27 October	Echoes, Silence, Patience & Grace	Foo Fighters	RCA	
3 November	Echoes, Silence, Patience & Grace	Foo Fighters	RCA	
10 November	Avenged Sevenfold	Avenged Sevenfold	Warner Bros.	
17 November	Echoes, Silence, Patience & Grace	Foo Fighters	RCA	
24 November	Mothership	Led Zeppelin	Atlantic	
1 December	Mothership	Led Zeppelin	Atlantic	
8 December	Mothership	Led Zeppelin	Atlantic	
15 December	Mothership	Led Zeppelin	Atlantic	
22 December	Mothership	Led Zeppelin	Atlantic	
29 December	Mothership	Led Zeppelin	Atlantic	

== See also ==
- 2007 in British music
- List of UK Rock & Metal Singles Chart number ones of 2007
