= 2007 in British music =

This is a summary of 2007 in music in the United Kingdom.

== Events ==
- 1 January
  - George Shearing is knighted for services to music in The Queen's New Year Honours List. Evelyn Glennie becomes a Dame. Imogen Cooper, John Rutter and Rod Stewart are appointed a CBE.
  - Digital downloads are included without restrictions in the charts for the first time.
- 30 January – Following rumours that The Police will reunite for a tour after 23 years to mark the 30th anniversary of the release of "Roxanne", the band announce that they will perform at the opening of the 49th annual Grammy Awards on 11 February and subsequently announce The Police Reunion Tour.
- February – A lightning strike severely damages Llandaff Cathedral organ.
- 25 March – Elton John plays Madison Square Garden for the 60th time, to celebrate his 60th birthday. The concert sets the record for most performances by an artist at the venue. Longtime songwriting partner Bernie Taupin makes an appearance, as well as celebrities Whoopi Goldberg and Robin Williams and former President Bill Clinton. John performs songs from his back catalogue, including "Ballad of a Well-Known Gun" and "Roy Rogers".
- 7 April – Joss Stone's third studio album Introducing Joss Stone enters the U.S. Billboard 200, becoming the highest début entry by a British female solo artist on the U.S. chart; the record was previously held by Amy Winehouse's Back to Black, which had come in at number seven the previous week.
- 4 May – Peter Hook announces on XFM radio that he has left New Order and that he and Bernard Sumner are no longer working together.
- 12 May – At the Eurovision Song Contest, the UK is represented by Scooch, who finish in penultimate place in the final with "Flying the Flag (For You)".
- 30 May–5 June – The Peel Bay Festival takes place on the Isle of Man.
- 22 June-25 June – Glastonbury Festival, headlined by Arctic Monkeys, The Killers, and The Who on Friday, Saturday and Sunday, respectively. Dame Shirley Bassey was also featured.
- 26 June – The Verve announce their reunion on Jo Whiley's show on BBC Radio 1, and announce tour dates and plans for an album. This reunion would be short-lived, as they would split up again 2 years later.
- 28 June – The Spice Girls announce their reunion at the O2 in London in a press conference televised worldwide.
- 1 July – The Concert for Diana takes place at Wembley Stadium in London. Performers include Duran Duran, Elton John, Fergie, Joss Stone, Kanye West, Nelly Furtado, Rod Stewart, and Tom Jones.
- 4–11 August – The Three Choirs Festival is held at Gloucester, with a programme including Benjamin Britten's War Requiem and Mahler's Symphony No 8.
- 24 August – Bryn Terfel's Faenol Festival opens with a concert featuring Girls Aloud. Other artists appearing during the weekend include Rebecca Evans, Carlos Alvarez, and Michael Ball.
- 22 September–29 September – The 35th North Wales International Music Festival is held at St Asaph.
- 1 October
  - Genesis release the second of 5 planned box sets, Genesis 1983-1998.
  - The BBC Scottish Symphony Orchestra announces the appointment of Donald Runnicles as its next Chief Conductor.
  - Jonny Greenwood, guitarist of Radiohead, announces on the band's website that they will release the new album In Rainbows in ten days; consumers can pay whatever price they want.
- 2 December – The Spice Girls open their reunion tour in Vancouver, Canada.
- 10 December – Led Zeppelin reunite in London for their first show in 25 years.
- 15 December – Leon Jackson is named winner of the fourth series of The X Factor. Rhydian Roberts is named runner-up, while Same Difference and Niki Evans finish in third and fourth place respectively.

== Classical music ==
- Nigel Hess – Piano Concerto

== Opera ==
- Tim Benjamin – The Corley Conspiracy (premièred 19 September)
- Jonathan Dove – The Adventures of Pinocchio (premièred 21 December)
- James MacMillan – The Sacrifice (premièred 22 September)
- Julian Wagstaff – The Turing Test (premièred 15 August)

== Musical theatre ==
- Blair on Broadway, by Iain Hollingshead, with music by Timothy Muller
- TONY! The Blair Musical, by Chris Bush, with music by Ian McCluskey
- Quadrophenia, with music by The Who

== Musical films ==
- Across the Universe, with music by The Beatles

== Music awards ==
=== British Composer Awards ===
- Chamber – Brian Ferneyhough: String Quartet No. 5
- Vocal – Oliver Knussen: Requiem – Songs for Sue
- Liturgical – Tarik O'Regan: Threshold of Night
- Stage works – Stephen McNeff: Tarka the Otter
- Choral – Julian Anderson: Heaven is Shy of Earth
- BBC Radio 3 Listeners' Award – Guto Puw: Oboe Concerto

=== Ivor Novello Awards ===
- Best song – "Elusive" – Scott Matthews
- Best contemporary song – "Rehab" – Amy Winehouse
- Best television soundtrack – The Virgin Queen (Martin Phipps)
- Best original film score – Ice Age: The Meltdown (John Powell)
- Best-selling UK single – "A Moment Like This" – Leona Lewis
- Outstanding Song Collection – Yusuf Islam
- Lifetime Achievement – Peter Gabriel
- Classical Music award – John Rutter
- PRS Outstanding Contribution to British Music – Norman Cook
- Songwriters of the Year – The Feeling

=== Mercury Music Prize ===
- Klaxons – Myths of the Near Future

== Deaths ==
- 14 February – Gareth Morris, flute player and educator, 86
- 22 February – Edgar Evans, operatic tenor, 94
- 23 February – Ian Wallace, drummer (King Crimson), 60
- 24 February – Bryan Balkwill, pianist and orchestral conductor, 84
- 28 February – Billy Thorpe, British-born Australian rock performer, 60
- 4 March – Richard Joseph, computer game composer, 53 (lung cancer)
- 4 April – Brian Fahey, composer and arranger, 87
- 18 June – Bernard Manning, comedian and singer, 76
- 5 July – George Melly, jazz vocalist, 80
- 15 July – Kelly Johnson, guitarist (Girlschool), 49
- 10 August – Anthony Wilson, record executive (Factory Records), 57
- 1 October – Ronnie Hazlehurst, composer and conductor, 79
- 20 October – Paul Raven, bassist (Killing Joke) 46 (heart attack)
- 1 December – Anton Rodgers, actor and singer, 74
- 25 December – Pat Kirkwood, actress and singer, 86
- 29 December – Joan Ingpen, opera talent manager who helped launch Luciano Pavarotti's career, 91

== See also ==
- 2007 in British radio
- 2007 in British television
- 2007 in the United Kingdom
- List of British films of 2007
