= Weapons of Grass Destruction =

Studio album by Hayseed Dixie
- Released: April 9, 2007
- Length: 48:05
- Label: Cooking Vinyl
- Producer: John Wheeler

Hayseed Dixie chronology
A Hot Piece of Grass (2005)	Weapons of Grass Destruction (2007)	No Covers (2008)

Weapons of Grass Destruction is the sixth full-length album by American band Hayseed Dixie, released in 2007. The album's name continues the band's practice of adding the word grass to common phrases, in this case, weapons of mass destruction. The ninth track on the album, a cover version of the Status Quo song "Down Down", features Francis Rossi as guest guitarist.

== Track listing ==
1. "Holidays in the Sun" (Sex Pistols cover) – 2:46
2. "Devil Woman" (Cliff Richard cover) – 3:16
3. "I Don't Feel Like Dancin'" (Scissor Sisters cover) – 3:48
4. "She Was Skinny When I Met Her" – 1:57
5. "Strawberry Fields Forever" (Beatles cover) – 3:12
6. "Before Your Old Man Gets Home" – 3:00
7. "Breaking the Law" (Judas Priest cover) – 2:33
8. "More Pretty Girls Than One" (Arthur Smith Trio cover) – 2:49
9. "Down Down" (Status Quo cover) – 4:08
10. "Walking Cane" – 3:21
11. "Paint It Black" (Rolling Stones cover) – 3:47
12. "Hungover Brokedown" – 3:46
13. "Poison" (Alice Cooper cover) – 4:06
14. "The Rider Song" – 3:24
15. "Bar B Que" (hidden track) – 1:46

== Bonus tracks ==
1. "Mein Teil" (Rammstein cover)
2. "I Got Erection" (Turbonegro cover)
3. "Eisgekühlter Bommerlunder" (Toten Hosen cover)

All three of the above tracks appear on the German version of the CD. I Got Erection appears on the U.S. version.
