= List of UK R&B Albums Chart number ones of 2007 =

The logo of the Official Charts Company, responsible for compiling all of the official music charts in the United Kingdom, including the R&B albums chart.

The UK R&B Chart is a weekly chart, first introduced in October 1994, that ranks the 40 biggest-selling singles and albums that are classified in the R&B genre in the United Kingdom. The chart is compiled by the Official Charts Company, and is based on sales of CDs, downloads, vinyl and other formats over the previous seven days.

The following are the number-one albums of 2007.

== Number-one albums ==
Issue date	Album	Artist(s)	Record label	Ref.
7 January	Back to Black	Amy Winehouse	Island	
14 January	Back to Black	Amy Winehouse	Island	
21 January	Back to Black	Amy Winehouse	Island	
28 January	Back to Black	Amy Winehouse	Island	
4 February	Panic Prevention	Jamie T	Virgin	
11 February	Back to Black	Amy Winehouse	Island	
18 February	Back to Black	Amy Winehouse	Island	
25 February	Back to Black	Amy Winehouse	Island	
4 March	Back to Black	Amy Winehouse	Island	
11 March	Back to Black	Amy Winehouse	Island	
18 March	Back to Black	Amy Winehouse	Island	
25 March	FutureSex/LoveSounds	Justin Timberlake	Jive/Zomba	
1 April	FutureSex/LoveSounds	Justin Timberlake	Jive/Zomba	
8 April	Shock Value	Timbaland	Mosley/Blackground	
15 April	FutureSex/LoveSounds	Justin Timberlake	Jive/Zomba	
22 April	Back to Black	Amy Winehouse	Island	
29 April	Back to Black	Amy Winehouse	Island	
6 May	Because of You	Ne-Yo	Def Jam/Compound	
13 May	Back to Black	Amy Winehouse	Island	
20 May	Back to Black	Amy Winehouse	Island	
27 May	Massive R&B - Spring Collection 2007	Various Artists	Universal Music TV	
3 June	Back to Black	Amy Winehouse	Island	
10 June	Good Girl Gone Bad	Rihanna	Def Jam/SRP	
17 June	Good Girl Gone Bad	Rihanna	Def Jam/SRP	
24 June	Good Girl Gone Bad	Rihanna	Def Jam/SRP	
1 July	Back to Black	Amy Winehouse	Island	
8 July	Back to Black	Amy Winehouse	Island	
15 July	R&B Love Collection	Various Artists	Universal Music TV	
22 July	Shock Value	Timbaland	Mosley/Blackground	
29 July	Shock Value	Timbaland	Mosley/Blackground	
5 August	Shock Value	Timbaland	Mosley/Blackground	
12 August	Shock Value	Timbaland	Mosley/Blackground	
19 August	Back to Black	Amy Winehouse	Island	
26 August	Back to Black	Amy Winehouse	Island	
2 September	Back to Black	Amy Winehouse	Island	
9 September	Back to Black	Amy Winehouse	Island	
16 September	Graduation	Kanye West	Roc-A-Fella/Def Jam	
23 September	Graduation	Kanye West	Roc-A-Fella/Def Jam	
30 September	Back to Black	Amy Winehouse	Island	
7 October	Back to Black	Amy Winehouse	Island	
14 October	Change	Sugababes	Island	
21 October	Change	Sugababes	Island	
28 October	Back to Black	Amy Winehouse	Island	
4 November	The Ultimate Collection	Whitney Houston	Arista	
11 November	Good Girl Gone Bad	Rihanna	Def Jam/SRP	
18 November	Spirit	Leona Lewis	Syco/Sony BMG/J	
25 November	Spirit	Leona Lewis	Syco/Sony BMG/J	
1 December	Spirit	Leona Lewis	Syco/Sony BMG/J	
8 December	Spirit	Leona Lewis	Syco/Sony BMG/J	
15 December	Spirit	Leona Lewis	Syco/Sony BMG/J	
23 December	Spirit	Leona Lewis	Syco/Sony BMG/J	
30 December	Spirit	Leona Lewis	Syco/Sony BMG/J	

== See also ==
- List of UK Albums Chart number ones of the 2010s
