= Young Guns discography =

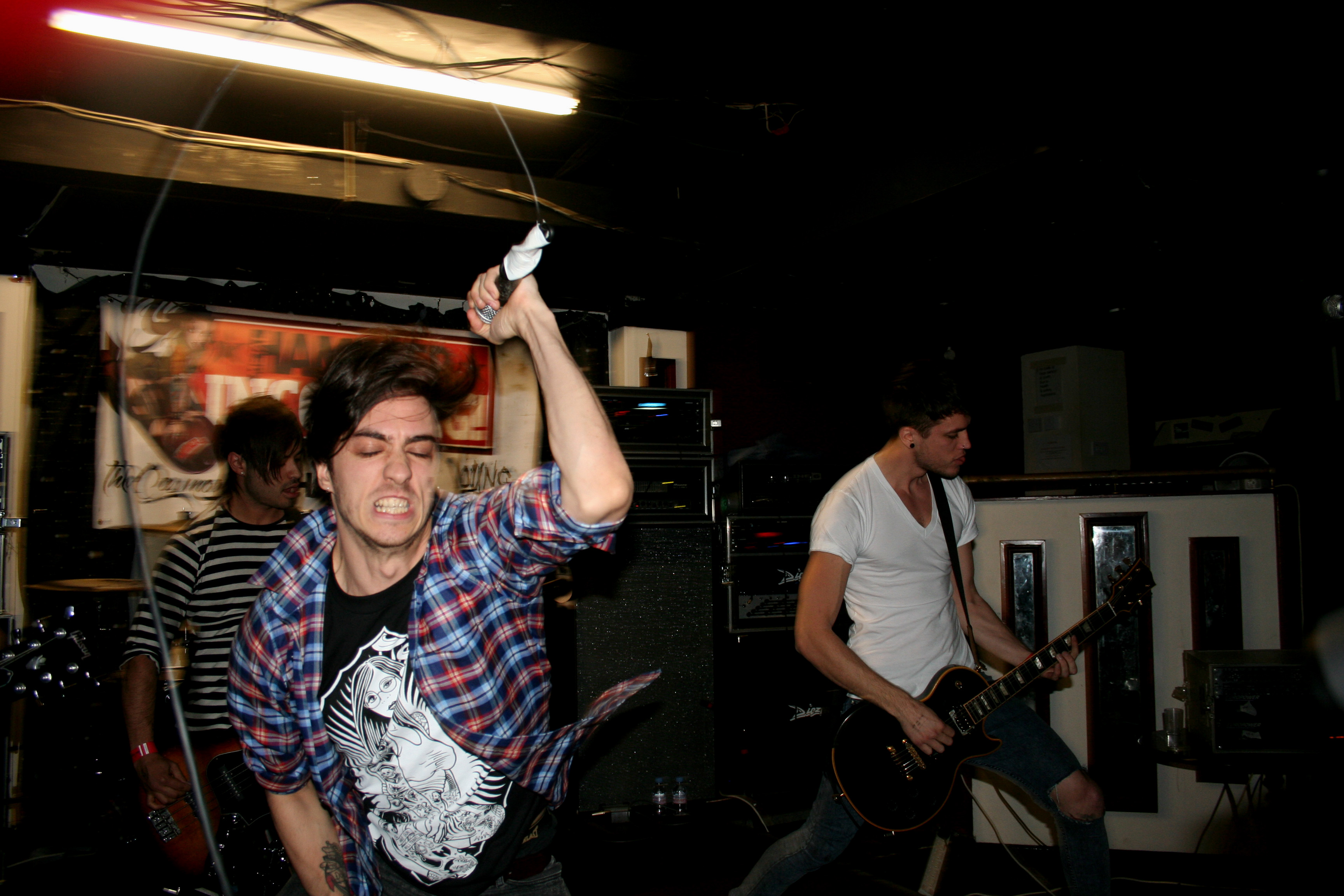
- Studio albums: 4
- EPs: 3
- Singles: 12
- Music videos: 14

Young Guns are an English rock band from Buckinghamshire and London. On 22 June 2009 they released their debut EP Mirrors, and their debut album All Our Kings Are Dead was released a year later on 12 July 2010. Their second album, Bones, was released in February 2012. Their third studio album, Ones and Zeros, was released in June 2015, and their fourth, Echoes, was released in September 2016.

== Studio albums ==
Title	Album	Peak chart positions		
Title	Album	UK	UK IND	UK ROCK
All Our Kings Are Dead	Released: 12 July 2010; Label: Live Forever; Formats: CD, download	43	3	3
Bones	Released: 6 February 2012; Label: Live Forever, Wind-Up, PIAS; Formats: CD, download	19	3	2
Ones and Zeros	Released: 8 June 2015; Label: Wind-Up; Formats: CD, download	21	—	2
Echoes	Released: 16 September 2016; Label: Wind-Up; Formats: CD, download	40	—	—

== EPs ==
Title	Details
Mirrors	Release: 22 June 2009; Label: Live Forever; Formats: CD, download
Sons of Apathy	Release: 30 May 2010; Label: Live Forever; Format: Download
Crystal Clear	Release: 25 July 2010; Label: Live Forever; Format: Download

== Singles ==
Title	Year	Peak chart positions							Album
Title	Year	UK	UK Rock	UK Indie	US Main.	US Rock	US Active Rock	CAN Active Rock	Album
"In the Night"	2009	–	–	–	–	–	–	–	Mirrors
"Winter Kiss"	2010	–	–	–	–	–	–	–	All Our Kings Are Dead
"Sons of Apathy"	2010	–	–	–	–	–	–	–	All Our Kings Are Dead
"Crystal Clear"	2010	–	9	27	–	–	–	–	All Our Kings Are Dead
"Weight of the World"	2010	–	27	–	–	–	–	–	All Our Kings Are Dead
"Stitches"	2011	–	–	–	–	–	–	–	All Our Kings Are Dead
"Learn My Lesson"	2011	–	–	–	–	–	–	–	Bones
"Bones"	2012	130	2	14	1	2	1	25	Bones
"Dearly Departed"	2012	–	–	–	–	–	–	–	Bones
"Towers (On My Way)"	2012	–	–	–	31	–	31	–	Bones
"You Are Not (Lonely)"	2012	–	–	–	33	–	31	–	Bones
"I Want Out"	2014	–	–	–	16	–	–	–	Ones and Zeros
"Speaking In Tongues"	2015	–	–	–	–	–	–	–	Ones and Zeros

== Music videos ==
Title	Year	Director(s)	Album
"In the Night"	2009	Lawrence Hardy	Mirrors EP
"Weight of the World"	2009	Lawrence Hardy	Mirrors EP
"Winter Kiss"	2010	Ben Thornley, Paul Burrows	All Our Kings Are Dead
"Sons of Apathy"	2010	Spence Nicholson	All Our Kings Are Dead
"Crystal Clear"	2010	unknown	All Our Kings Are Dead
"Weight of the World"	2010	Lawrence Hardy	All Our Kings Are Dead
"Stitches"	2011	Tim Mattia	All Our Kings Are Dead
"Learn My Lesson"	2011	Tim Fox	Bones
"Brother In Arms"	2012	unknown	Bones
"Bones"	2012	Tim Mattia	Bones
"Dearly Departed"	2012	Tim Mattia	Bones
"Towers (On My Way)"	2012	Tim Mattia	Bones
"You Are Not"	2012	Michael Bailey	Bones
"I Want Out"	2014	Drew Cox	Ones and Zeros
"Speaking In Tonges"	2015	unknown	Ones and Zeros
"Daylight"	2015	unknown	Ones and Zeros
"Rising Up"	2015	Fraser Taylor, Brendan Donahue	Ones and Zeros
"Ones and Zeros"	2015	unknown	Ones and Zeros
"Bulletproof"	2016	Markus Hofko	Echoes
"Mad World"	2016	Scott Hansen	Echoes
