= Sanguine (band) =

British alternative metal band

- Origin: Exeter, Devon, England
- Genre: Alternative metal
- Years active: 2004 – 2019
- Past members: Tarin Kerrey; Nick Magee; Ross Andrew; Matt Feld

Sanguine was a British alternative metal band formed in Exeter, Devon, England, in 2004. The band has released one EP/single/DVD "Live Consume Drive" (2008), an album, Sanguine (2012), and a professional studio album Black Sheep (2016).

== History ==
In 2008, Sanguine recorded and released its first single "Live, Consume, Drive" which was a three-song release with two videos - "Live, Consume, Drive" and "Simplify".

In early 2009, the single "Live, Consume, Drive" (LCD) was played on the Kerrang! and Scuzz UK music TV stations, and radio stations across the UK, including Music Choice. The video was also shown on the Propeller TV music show TUUNES. Later in 2009 and early 2010, the single "LCD" became the theme tune for the Propeller TV show METALTUUNES. Footage of the "LCD" video was shown on the Glastonbury Festival media screens.

In 2012, the band released its first album, Sanguine, following which the band was invited to perform at Download Festival 2012 and main support for Megadeth in London. The album included video releases for "Given Up" and "For Love".

Vocalist Tarin Kerrey was also invited to do backing vocals for Iron Maiden's Adrian Smith and SikTh's Mikee Goodman in their side project Primal Rock Rebellion. Kerrey appeared on three of the tracks.

In 2013, Sanguine began recording a second album in Sweden with the ex-In Flames guitarist Jesper Strömblad and the producer Daniel Flores. The album included two songs, "Empty" and "Breathe Out", co-written by Nick Magee, Tarin Kerrey, Jesper Strömblad and Daniel Flores.

In 2014, Sanguine showcased the finished album at the Global Rock Summit in Hollywood which led to record and label deals across Europe and Japan. In late 2015, Sanguine released a sneak-peek of the new album, Black Sheep, releasing one video for "Social Decay" (with footage from the 1936 propaganda film Reefer Madness) and a lyric video for the song "Black Sheep".

Sanguine's second album, Black Sheep, was scheduled for release on 29 January 2016. Singles released from this album were "Pretty Girl" (with a self-made video shot in Las Vegas) and "Save Me" (with the short-film Seed by the Australian director Tyson Wade Johnston).

== Members ==
Tarin Kerrey (original member) - vocals
Nick Magee (original member) - guitar and vocals
Matt Feld (original member) - drums
Ross Andrew (from 2013) - bass guitar

=== Past members ===
Duncan Jones (2004) - guitar
Tom Sherwood (2004-2012) - bass guitar

== Discography ==
=== Demos and limited editions ===
- No Cure (2005)
- Sanguine (2007)

=== Singles ===
- "Live, Consume, Drive" - includes the songs "Live, Consume, Drive" (LCD), "Simplify" and "Territory" (2009) with a DVD of videos for "Live, Consume, Drive" and "Simplify" (2008)

=== Albums ===
- Sanguine (2012)
- Black Sheep (2016)
- Cold Blood (2019)
