= Echoes (Young Guns album) =

Studio album by Young Guns
- Released: 16 September 2016
- Recorded: 2016
- Studio: House of Loud
- Genres: Alternative rock; hard rock
- Length: 37:22
- Label: Wind-up
- Producers: David Bendeth; Adrian Bushby

Young Guns chronology
Ones and Zeros (2015)	Echoes (2016)

Singles from Echoes
- 1. "Bulletproof" Released: 1 June 2016; 2. "Mad World" Released: 15 July 2016

Echoes is the fourth studio album by British rock band Young Guns. It was released on 16 September 2016 through Wind-up Records. The album was the band's first release to be recorded without long-time drummer Ben Jolliffe, who left the band a year prior to its release. Two singles were released in promotion of the album, "Bulletproof" and "Mad World".

== Background ==
After releasing their third studio album, Ones and Zeros, in June 2015, and wrapping up touring in support of it in October, the band found itself at a difficult juncture. After the success of their release Bones, largely based on the immense success of the track "Bones", the band, shooting for even larger mainstream success, instead stumbled; Ones and Zeros had a lengthy, troubled recording time, and the release stalled commercially. The band convened in October to debate whether or not members wanted to go on with the band. The result was near unanimous; all members wanted to push forward full force with the exception of drummer Ben Jolliffe, who instead wanted to focus on his family life at home. The end result of the discussion was for the band to part ways with their drummer of seven years. The split was still amicable for Jolliffe, with the band just releasing a statement that he wanted to move in a "different direction" than the rest of the band. He was replaced by new drummer, Chris Kamrada. Rather than be discouraged by the removal of the member and friend, the band used it as motivation to immediately start work on a fourth studio album.

== Writing and recording ==
Contrary to the lengthy two years writing and recording sessions for Ones and Zeros, which was extended due heavy touring and changing of record producers mid-way of the sessions, the sessions for Echoes were far quicker. The bulk of the album was written over the course of an eight-week period spanning from November 2015 to January 2016. The banded started fresh with the material, choosing not to go back to any material written for Ones and Zeros or any other prior albums. Jolliffe's absence did not affect sessions much, as he hadn't previously had much of a role in the writing process. Frontman Gustav Wood and guitarists John and Fraser Taylor were the principle writers, would usually write Jolliffe's drum parts for him in the process. The writing sessions largely operated as they had in the past, with the exception of not having a drummer to do jam sessions to test out ideas in the writing phase. Recording began in February 2016 and ran for a five-week period. The band worked with rock music producer David Bendeth and recorded in the House of Loud studio in New Jersey. The band allowed Kamrada the freedom to record his drum parts as he felt best fit the music, something the band felt helped create a new dynamic between the band in general. While the band expected to be done after the five weeks of recording, upon taking a short vacation, Wood and John Taylor felt inspired to keep going, writing around five new songs. Upon presenting them to the rest of the band, they were generally impressed, choosing to flesh out and record three of the tracks for the album's final track listing. Recording sessions for the album were completed in May 2016.

== Composition and themes ==
Wood described the album as a return to the melodic, guitar-driven, riff-heavy sound of their second album, Bones. The band felt the sound better captured the spontaneity and energy of the quick sessions better than the more broad, experimental electronic sound of Ones and Zeros that was rooted more in piano and electronic beats. However, with the band not dropping the electronic elements entirely, many critics described the album's sound as more of a mix of the two albums, combining the guitar-driven rock sound of Bones with the more electronic rock sound of Ones and Zeros, while maintaining both album's layered, wall of sound approach to music.

Mirroring the recording sessions, the band described the album's theme as being about "letting go of the past and moving on towards a brighter future." The themes were also partially inspired by Wood's recent breakup from a girlfriend of six years, and seeing his father again for the first time in twenty years. Wood stated that the album's title track, "Echoes", summed up the general theme of the album as well, stating on how it's about "reflecting on how tempting it can be to revisit memories of times gone by in a bid to keep that part of your life alive, but facing up to the fact that eventually you have to let things go and move on." He described its sound as "mix of a sound that looks back to when we first started the band, and our newer material and just has a groove and atmosphere that we really enjoyed creating", resulting in a "more modern, mature" version of Young Guns. Lead single "Bulletproof" was described as "a big, anthemic rock song". The penultimate track "Paradise" started as a wall of sound rock song, but was eventually stripped down to just piano and vocals, with the band feeling that the stripped down ballad approach was better suited to show the song's melody and emotion.

== Release and promotion ==
Prior to the album's release, the band promoted the album's upcoming release in touring as part of the 2016 iteration of the Vans Warped Tour. The band is scheduled to perform at all 40 shows of the tour. The album's release, initially announced for August 2016, was eventually delayed to 16 September 2016. The album will be their third to be released through Windup Records. The album's first single, "Bulletproof", was released ahead of the album in early June 2016. It was later made the official theme song of WWE Clash of Champions. A second single, "Mad World", was released on 15 July 2016. Shortly after the album's release, the band embarked on a tour with Billy Talent.

== Critical reception ==
The album was generally well received by critics. New Noise magazine praised the album for focusing on the rock elements more than Ones and Zeros had, but criticized the a number of the slower, softer songs, like "Paradise" towards the end of the album. Similarly, Upset magazine praised the move away from Ones and Zero's "arena rock" sound in favor of focusing on a more guitar-driven sound, calling it "exciting, dark, and driven". Cryptic Rock praised the band for finding "the balance between their heavier days and their more recent electronic textured alternative sounds", resulting in a " indefinable and compelling something" that "set the tracks apart from the alternative rock old story". Bring the Noise praised the album as well, stating that despite the fact that it was softer than their earlier material, like that found on All Our Kings Are Dead, Echoes felt more polished than their prior releases, stating that "Each song is as anthemic as the last, by combining the better aspects of their previous three albums: with the more electronic feel of Ones and Zeros combined with the huge-sounding guitars and strong lyrics of their first two albums, they’ve managed to deliver an album that’s positively oozing with potential singles...there is some pretty conclusive proof that Young Guns are experts at writing innately catchy music." Volume praised the release as an album that is both diverse and unique, creating a sound that grows on the listener over time.

== Track listing ==
No.	Title	Writer(s)	Length
1.	"Bulletproof"	Gustav Wood; John Taylor; Fraser Taylor; Simon Mitchell; David Bendeth	3:05
2.	"Echoes"	Wood; J. Taylor; F. Taylor; Mitchell	3:26
3.	"Careful What You Wish For"	Wood; J. Taylor; F. Taylor; Mitchell; Erik Ron	3:29
4.	"Paranoid"	Wood; J. Taylor; F. Taylor; Mitchell; Bendeth	3:13
5.	"Mad World"	Wood; J. Taylor; F. Taylor; Mitchell; Drew Fulk; Steve Aiello; Josh Strock	2:54
6.	"Awakening"	Wood; J. Taylor; F. Taylor; Mitchell; Ron	3:52
7.	"Living in a Dream Is So Easy"	Wood; J. Taylor; F. Taylor; Mitchell	3:20
8.	"Buried"	Wood; J. Taylor; F. Taylor; Mitchell; Bendeth	3:21
9.	"Mercury in Retrograde"	Wood; J. Taylor; F. Taylor; Mitchell	3:21
10.	"Paradise"	Wood; J. Taylor; F. Taylor; Mitchell; Bendeth	3:31
11.	"Afterglow"	Wood; J. Taylor; F. Taylor; Mitchell; Bendeth	3:50
Total length:			37:22

== Personnel ==
Young Guns

- Gustav Wood – lead vocals
- John Taylor – guitars, backing vocals, programming
- Fraser Taylor – Guitars, keyboards, programming, piano
- Simon Mitchell – bass guitar
- Chris Kamrada – drums

Additional personnel

- David Bendeth – producer (1, 2, 4, 7-11), mixing (1)
- Adrian Bushby – producer and engineer (3, 5, 6)
- Brian Robbins – engineer (1, 2, 4, 7-11), additional programming (1, 2, 4, 5, 7-9, 11)
- Koby Nelson – additional programming (1, 2, 4, 5, 7-9, 11)
- Erik Ron – additional programming (3, 6)
- Maika Maile – additional programming (6)
- Doug Allen – additional programming (10)
- Dan Korneff – mixing (2-11)
- Paul Blakemore – mastering

== Charts ==
Chart (2016)	Peak position
Scottish Albums (Official Charts)	36
UK Albums (Official Charts)	40
UK Rock & Metal Albums (Official Charts)	3
