= The Trees Are Dead & Dried Out Wait for Something Wild =

Studio album by Sikth
- Released: 18 August 2003
- Recorded: 2003
- Genres: Progressive metal, mathcore, avant-garde metal
- Length: 60:33
- Label: Unparalleled Carousel/Gut (UK) Victor Entertainment (Japan)
- Producers: Sikth, Andrew Scarth

Sikth chronology
How May I Help You? (2002)	The Trees Are Dead & Dried Out Wait for Something Wild (2003)	Death of a Dead Day (2006)

Singles from The Trees Are Dead & Dried Out Wait for Something Wild
- 1. "Scent of the Obscene" Released: 27 October 2003; 2. "Peep Show" Released: 29 March 2004

Professional ratings
Review scores
Source	Rating
Blistering	Mixed
Drowned in Sound	9/10
MusicOMH	Positive

The Trees Are Dead & Dried Out Wait for Something Wild is the debut album by British progressive metal band Sikth, released on 18 August 2003 by Unparalleled Records. The album was produced by the band and Andrew Scarth.

== Background ==
Sikth was formed in 1999 by vocalists Tristan Lucey and Mikee Goodman along with Dan Weller, Graham 'Pin' Pinney, and Jamie Hunter. The band's lineup would be cemented in 2001 with the addition of Justin Hill, James Leach, and Dan 'Loord' Foord; Lucey and Hunter would depart from the band around the same time.

The band released its first EP, Let the Transmitting Begin, in early 2002 through Infernal Records. The initial release featured the songs "Such the Fool", "If You Weren't So Perfect", and "Hold My Finger"; all three songs would be re-recorded for The Trees Are Dead & Dried Out. Shortly after the EP's release, Sikth was signed to Unparalleled Carousel/Gut Records, who would release the band's second EP How May I Help You? on 23 September 2002. How May I Help You? featured the title track, "Suffice", and a cover of "Tupelo", originally by Nick Cave and the Bad Seeds.

== Release ==
The Trees Are Dead & Dried Out Wait for Something Wild was released on 18 August 2003 through Unparalleled Carousel in the UK. It was released in Japan on 21 January 2004 through Victor Entertainment. The album's first single, "Scent of the Obscene", was released on 27 October 2003 and featured a cover of the Iron Maiden song "Wrathchild" as its b-side. Second single, "Peep Show", was released in December 2003.

== Track listing ==
No.	Title	Length
1.	"Scent of the Obscene"	4:37
2.	"Pussyfoot"	3:25
3.	"Hold My Finger"	3:44
4.	"Skies of Millennium Night"	4:42
5.	"Emerson (Pt.1)"	1:47
6.	"Peep Show"	4:10
7.	"Wait for Something Wild"	5:28
8.	"Tupelo" (Nick Cave and the Bad Seeds cover)	7:37
9.	"Can't We All Dream?"	8:49
10.	"Emerson (Pt.2)"	1:53
11.	"How May I Help You?"	3:39
12.	"(If You Weren't So) Perfect"	3:36
13.	"Such the Fool"	3:43
14.	"When Will the Forest Speak...?"	3:23
Total length:		1:00:30

Japanese Bonus Tracks
No.	Title	Length
15.	"Wrathchild" (Iron Maiden cover)	3:02
16.	"Suffice"	3:14
17.	"How May I Help You?" (music video)	3:46
Total length:		1:06:46

Vinyl Bonus Tracks
No.	Title	Length
15.	"Wrathchild" (Iron Maiden cover)	3:02
16.	"Pussyfoot" (Alternate mixing/mastering)	3:52
17.	"Skies of Millennium Night" (Live in London 2004)	5:46
18.	"When Will the Forest Speak...?" (Live in London 2004)	1:01

== Personnel ==
Sikth

- Dan Weller – guitar, piano
- Graham "Pin" Pinney – guitar
- James Leach – bass
- Mikee W. Goodman – vocals, lyrics, synthesizer
- Justin Hill – vocals
- Dan "Loord" Foord – drums, percussion

Other personnel

- Andrew Scarth – audio engineering
- Colin Richardson – mixing
- Paul Hoare and Jakob Nygard – additional mixing
- Vlado Meller – mastering
- Dick Beetham – additional mastering, editing and compiling
- Paul Chessell – art direction and design
- Jana Leon and Patrick Ryan – photography
