= I Want Out =

I Want Out may refer to:

- I Want Out (Helloween song)
- I Want Out (Matchbox song)
- I Want Out, a single by Young Guns
- Live in the U.K., a 1989 live album by Helloween, also known as I Want Out – Live
