= Dawn of Reprisal =

Studio album by Malefice
- Released: 27 February 2009
- Recorded: Fortress Studios (London) and Timeless Studios (London)
- Genres: Thrash metal, melodic metalcore
- Length: 42:03
- Label: Metal Blade
- Producers: Justin Hill and Dan Weller

Malefice chronology
Entities (2007)	Dawn of Reprisal (2009)	Awaken the Tides (2011)

Dawn of Reprisal is the second album by Malefice, released in February 2009 on Metal Blade Records. It was produced by Justin Hill and Dan Weller. The album has been compared to the work of God Forbid and Lamb of God.

== Reception ==
Professional ratings
Review scores
Source	Rating
AllMusic	3.5/5 stars
HCS.net	3/5 stars
Metal Sucks	3/5 stars

Greg Prato, writing for AllMusic, called Dawn of Reprisal "straight-ahead, vintage metal" without "sonic experimentation", and likened the album to the metal of the early 90s. He felt that "The Midas Effect", "An Architect of Your Demise" and "End of Days" were the best songs.

Hardcore Sound felt the band had done a "great job" on Dawn of Reprisal, but said it "really lacks the diversity".

== Track listing ==
1. "The Midas Effect" – 3:47
2. "Abandon Hope" – 4:03
3. "An Architect of Your Demise" – 4:13
4. "End of Days" – 4:15
5. "Human Portrait" – 3:35
6. "As I Bleed" – 4:53
7. "When Embers Ignite" – 3:21
8. "Retribution" – 4:33
9. "Hatred Justified" – 5:02
10. "Sickened" – 4:22

== Personnel ==
- Dale Butler – vocals
- Ben Symons – guitars
- Alex Vuskans – guitars
- Thomas Hynes – bass
- Craig Thomas – drums
