= The Future in Whose Eyes? =

Studio album by Sikth
- Released: 2 June 2017
- Recorded: December 2016 to March 2017
- Genres: Progressive metal, mathcore, avant-garde metal
- Length: 46:04
- Labels: Millennium Night, Peaceville, Snapper
- Producer: Dan Weller

Sikth chronology
Opacities (2015)	The Future in Whose Eyes? (2017)

Singles from The Future in Whose Eyes?
- 1. "No Wishbones" Released: 11 February 2017; 2. "Vivid" Released: 31 March 2017; 3. "Golden Cufflinks" Released: 16 May 2017

Professional ratings
Review scores
Source	Rating
AllMusic	4/5 stars
Distorted Sound	9/10
Exclaim!	6/10
Metal Hammer	4/5 stars
Metal Injection	8.5/10 stars

The Future in Whose Eyes? is the third studio album by British progressive metal band Sikth, their first full-length album since their 2008–2013 hiatus, following their return EP Opacities. It was released worldwide on 2 June 2017. It is the first and only album to feature vocalist Joe Rosser, who replaced vocalist Justin Hill in 2016. The album was released on CD, vinyl, and digital formats.

== Track listing ==
All lyrics are written by Goodman; all music is composed by Sikth.

No.	Title	Length
1.	"Vivid"	4:28
2.	"Century of the Narcissist?"	4:09
3.	"The Aura"	4:03
4.	"This Ship Has Sailed"	1:19
5.	"Weavers of Woe"	5:31
6.	"Cracks of Light" (featuring Spencer Sotelo)	4:13
7.	"Golden Cufflinks"	4:07
8.	"The Moon's Been Gone for Hours"	2:46
9.	"Riddles of Humanity"	3:46
10.	"No Wishbones"	4:30
11.	"Ride the Illusion"	4:37
12.	"When It Rains"	2:35
Total length:		46:04

Deluxe edition bonus tracks
No.	Title	Length
13.	"Flogging the Horses" (live)	2:28
14.	"Golden Cufflinks" (live)	4:03
15.	"Philistine Philosophies" (live)	4:03
16.	"The Peace I Crave" ("Vivid" reimagined)	3:16
17.	"No Light in the Well" ("Cracks of Light" reimagined)	3:52
18.	"The Aura" (Instrumental)	4:02

== Personnel ==
=== Music ===
- Mikee Goodman – vocals
- Joe Rosser – vocals
- Dan Weller – guitars
- Graham "Pin" Pinney – guitars
- James Leach – bass
- Dan "Loord" Foord – drums, percussion

=== Production ===
- Produced by Dan Weller
- Mixed by Adam "Nolly" Getgood
- Mastered by Ermin Hamidovic
- Vocals engineered at R&R Studios
- Guitars, bass and drums engineered at Monkey Puzzle House Studios
- Artwork and design by Meats Meier
- Additional vocals on "Cracks of Light" by Spencer Sotelo (Periphery)

== Charts ==
Chart (2017)	Peak position
Scottish Albums (Official Charts)	88
UK Albums (Official Charts)	100
