= Entities (album) =

Studio album by Malefice
- Released: August 20, 2007
- Recorded: Newport, Wales
- Genre: Thrash metal, melodic metalcore
- Length: 46:33
- Label: Anticulture
- Producer: Justin Hill & Dan Weller

Malefice chronology
Relentless EP (2006)	Entities (2007)	Dawn of Reprisal (2009)

Entities is the debut album from Malefice, a British thrash metal/melodic death metal band from Reading, Berkshire. It was released 20 August 2007 and was produced by Justin Hill and Dan Weller of the band SikTh. A video for "Risen Through the Ashes" was also made to coincide with the release of the album.

== Reception ==
Professional ratings
Review scores
Source	Rating
Kerrang!	4/5 stars
Rocksound	9/10 stars
Terrorizer	8/10 stars
Big Cheese	4/5 stars

The album received positive reviews from publications such as Kerrang! and Exclaim!. Exclaim!'s Bill Whish described it as "a solid, mostly consistent release".

== Track listing ==
1. "Empirical Proof (Part One)" – 1:36
2. "Risen Through the Ashes" – 3:40
3. "Into a New Light" – 3:57
4. "Dreams Without Courage" – 5:51 (guest vocals by Justin Hill – SikTh)
5. "History Repeats" – 3:38
6. "Traitor to All You Know" – 5:47
7. "Horizon Burns" – 4:33
8. "Empirical Proof (Part Two)" – 2:11
9. "As Skies Turn Black" – 3:55
10. "Nothing Left" – 2:57
11. "A World Deceased" – 4:33
12. "Bringer of War" – 3:55
