= Ones and Zeros (Young Guns album) =

Studio album by Young Guns
- Released: 8 June 2015
- Studio: Manhattan, New York, Bath, Somerset, Real World Studios
- Genre: Alternative rock
- Length: 44:17
- Label: Virgin EMI; Wind-up
- Producer: Steve Osborne

Young Guns chronology
Bones (2012)	Ones and Zeros (2015)	Echoes (2016)

Singles from Ones and Zeros
- 1. "I Want Out" Released: 7 August 2014; 2. "Speaking in Tongues" Released: 5 February 2015; 3. "Daylight" Released: 7 April 2015; 4. "Infinity" Released: 18 May 2015; 5. "Rising Up" Released: 3 July 2015; 6. "Ones and Zeros" Released: 4 November 2015

Ones and Zeros is the third studio album by British rock band Young Guns. The album went through an extensive development period between 2013 and 2015 as the band worked across a multitude of studios, countries, and music producers before being released on 8 June 2015 through Virgin EMI Records and Wind-up Records. The album marked an evolution of sound for the band, keeping with the full alternative rock sound while adding elements of electronic rock as well. The album debuted at number three on the Billboard Top Heatseekers chart, higher than their prior album, Bones, which peaked at number 35, though none of the album's six singles were able to match the success of the single "Bones", with only the first single, "I Want Out", managing to chart at all.

== Writing and recording ==
Work on the album began in earnest in early 2013, with frontman Gustav Wood stating that they had a few songs that were "half-written at best". The band, inspired and motivated by their success with their single "Bones", which topped the Billboard Mainstream Rock chart in 2013, but still decided to make a change in their sound, both as a desire to not repeat themselves as artists, and to create music they personally would want to both make and listen to themselves. The band was greatly influenced and inspired by the band Placebo, a band they felt was "universal" in their public appeal, but firmly a rock band in their roots.

By mid-2013, the band started a month-long session of writing, demoing, and pre-production work for the album. While prior albums had been recorded in Britain and Thailand, for this album, work on Ones and Zeros began in Manhattan, New York. The opportunity had opened up due to the band signing to a new record label, Virgin EMI Records, though it had prevented the band from starting recording sessions sooner, and forced them to start over from scratch with their material. Still, the band took it; as it allowed for a lot of access to the studio, which lead to improved efficiency, with less rough "home-recorded" demos, and more higher quality ones in a faster amount of time. The band's first choice had been to work with pop music producer Ariel Rechtshaid, though plans feel through upon learning of the two-year waiting list for his services, in addition to stylistic concerns, with wanting to ultimately still create a rock record. Instead, the band elected to work with Dan the Automator, who had produced the work of alternative rock and hip hop band Gorillaz. While Wood referred to the early sessions as a "great experience", the band ultimately decided to part ways with the producer after the early recording sessions, deeming that it "wasn't quite what Young Guns were looking for." While they had welcomed the challenge of working with a non-rock producer, ultimately, Wood stated that the band and the producer had very different approaches in creating music, and irreconcilably different ideas and end goals for the album's sound. Despite the issues with producers, the band was still able to amass a "pretty great amount of material", including the initial incarnation of the album's first single, "I Want Out", and their third single "Daylight".

The band took a break in recording to do a short tour with Bullet for My Valentine and Asking Alexandria, with recording sessions resuming in 2014. Writing sessions started back up in April 2014, in London, in a house the band rented out. The recording sessions moved to Bath, Somerset, with music producer Steve Osborne. The sessions with Osborne went far smoother, the band welcomed his "old-school" approach and extensive experience in making albums with band's like U2, which helped the band find a more mature approach to making music. Wood states that Osborne's input was less about it being "a perfect take", and more about whether or not he felt an emotional response to the material". Even though the band meshed with Osborne better, the sessions were difficult at times. Wood and guitarist Fraser Taylor rewrote the chorus to the track "Lullaby" 10 times before settling on the final version in the last recording sessions.

The band sent the final recordings to be mixed in November 2014.

== Sound and lyrical themes ==
Wood described the process of creating the album, which was different than their past approach on the band's prior two albums All Our Kings Are Dead and Bones:

"We found that the way we wrote was quite different. We wrote a lot of the time around piano, or around synth and then it was about what can the guitars do that’s really important but we’re not just throwing in a thousand guitars for the sake of it. So funnily enough, I think it’s probably our heaviest record, but it’s also our leanest."

AllMusic described the sound of the album as "doubles down on the more mainstream aspects of 2012's Bones, while introducing some progressive elements", and stating that while the album has many elements of electropop, there is enough elements of alternative rock in it to appeal to hard rock fans as well. "Rising Up" was described as having "hints of metalcore", while "I Want Out" was described simply as "pop".

As with the band's prior albums, the lyrics were largely written by Wood about his own personal experiences. However, Wood made the lyrics a little more abstract and open to interpretation, feeling that the lyrics from their prior album Bones were so personal that it could be difficult to perform them in front of large crowds in their live concerts. He also tried to make the lyrics less "confessional", instead moving more into themes related to staying positive in the face adversity. The theme was reflective of the album's recording process, with songs, especially "Daylight", being in reference to getting through the lengthy and difficult recording sessions for the album.

The fact that the album was recorded across multiple countries also influenced the album's lyrics. The lyrics to "Infinity" were inspired by the band looking over New York skyline and Empire State Building when struggling to come up with lyrics for the song.

== Release and promotion ==
The first single from the album, "I Want Out", was premiered on 7 August 2014 on Alternative Press, almost 10 months prior to the release of the album. A music video, directed by Drew Cox, was released at the same time. The video, featuring a lot of special effects and "trippy" visuals, was an effort to make a video unconventional to most modern rock bands. The single peaked at number 16 on the Billboard Mainstream Rock chart. The band had initially aimed for a February 2015 release timeframe, but the release was pushed back, with the band instead releasing a second single, "Speaking in Tongues", at that time, while announcing the official release date for the album – June 8, 2015. The band signed with American record label Wind-up Records well ahead of release to prevent the long delay in release in the United States that had occurred with Bones. Two months prior to the album's release, embarked on a short North American tour with American rock band Breaking Benjamin, who were also promoting an upcoming album release in June. A third single, "Daylight", was released in April 2015, a fourth single, "Infinity" in May 2015, a fifth single, "Rising Up", in July 2015, and a sixth single, "Ones and Zeros" in November 2015.

The album debuted at number three on the Billboard Top Heatseekers chart, higher than their prior album, Bones, which peaked at number 35. However, none of the six singles were able to match the success of the single "Bones", with "I Want Out" being the only one managing to chart at all.

== Critical reception ==
Professional ratings
Review scores
Source	Rating
AllMusic	3/5 stars
Nouse	5/5 stars

Reception for the album have generally been positive. AllMusic praised Woods' vocals as a stand-out aspect, concluding that he is "...a solid vocalist with the kind of clean, power-forward croon that lends itself well to the material, and the band digs in with gusto... just letting the needle stay in the red, but it's hard not to feel like the whole affair is just one long song in search of an epic sports achievement montage." Nouse strongly praised Ones and Zeros, praising it for its cohesiveness as an album and concluding "The guitars are heavy, the synths are cheerful, the hooks are big and Wood’s voice is wonderfully clear and emotive. Ones and Zeroes marks more chances taken than on any of their previous albums, and the result is sophisticated alt-rock whose only flaw is a reliance on the emotional impact of juxtaposing slow openings and raucous choruses."

== Track listing ==
No.	Title	Length
1.	"Rising Up"	3:24
2.	"I Want Out"	3:42
3.	"Infinity"	4:21
4.	"Memento Mori"	4:48
5.	"Lullaby"	4:05
6.	"Daylight"	3:29
7.	"Speaking in Tongues"	4:39
8.	"Colour Blind"	3:41
9.	"Gravity"	3:58
10.	"Die on Time"	3:43
11.	"Ones and Zeros"	4:27

Deluxe edition
No.	Title	Length
12.	"I Want Out" (single version)	3:45
13.	"I Don't Need God"	3:59
14.	"I Want Out" (Knights remix)	3:42
15.	"Daylight" (demo)	3:36
16.	"Infinity" (demo)	4:11

US deluxe edition
No.	Title	Length
12.	"I Want Out" (single version)	3:45

== Personnel ==
Band

- Gustav Wood – vocals
- Fraser Taylor – lead guitar
- John Taylor – rhythm guitar
- Simon Mitchell – bass guitar
- Ben Jolliffe – drums

Production

- Steve Osborne – production
- Adrian Bushby – mixing
- Howie Weinberg – mastering

Credits per AllMusic

== Charts ==
Chart (2015)	Peak position
US Billboard Top Heatseekers Chart	3
UK Albums (OCC)	21
