= Opacities (EP) =

EP by SikTh
- Released: 4 December 2015
- Recorded: 2015
- Studios: Chapel Studios, Lincolnshire
- Genres: Progressive metal; mathcore; avant-garde metal
- Length: 27:04
- Label: Independent
- Producers: Dan Weller; Justin Hill; Mikee Goodman

SikTh chronology
Death of a Dead Day (2006)	Opacities (2015)	The Future in Whose Eyes? (2017)

Singles from Opacities
- 1. "Philistine Philosophies" Released: 2 November 2015

Professional ratings
Review scores
Source	Rating
Metal Injection	9/10
New Noise	5/5 stars

Opacities is the fourth EP by British progressive metal band SikTh. The EP is the band's first release since reforming in 2014. Opacities was self–released by the band on 4 December 2015.

== Background and recording ==
SikTh reformed in 2014 and played at Download Festival followed by a UK tour. The band announced they would begin recording a new album in summer 2015 with a release scheduled sometime in November/December. The album was crowd funded via PledgeMusic and was recorded without the assistance of a record label.

== Release and promotion ==
In promotion of Opacities a music video for the song "Philistine Philosophies" was released on 2 November 2015. The album became available for streaming via The Independent a month later on 2 December. Opacities was released on 4 December. SikTh played five shows with Slipknot in support of the EP.

== Track listing ==
All lyrics are written by Mikee Goodman; all music is composed by SikTh, except where noted.

No.	Title	Music	Length
1.	"Behind the Doors"		4:25
2.	"Philistine Philosophies"		5:02
3.	"Under the Weeping Moon"		4:39
4.	"Tokyo Lights"	spoken word	1:39
5.	"Walking Shadows"		5:37
6.	"Days Are Dreamed"	Weller, Foord, Pinney, Leech, Goodman, Abi Fry	6:15
Total length:			27:04

== Personnel ==
SikTh

- Mikee Goodman – vocals
- Justin Hill – vocals
- Dan Weller – lead guitar
- Graham "Pin" Pinney – rhythm guitar
- James Leach – bass
- Dan "Loord" Foord – drums, percussion

Additional personnel

- Abi Fry – viola on "Days Are Dreamed"

Production

- Dan Weller – producer, engineer
- Justin Hill – producer, engineer
- Mikee Goodman – engineer, producer and mixing on "Tokyo Lights"
- Tim Morris – engineer
- Joe Sage – engineer
- Forrester Savell – mixing
- Dick Beetham – mastering
- Dan Mumford – art and layout
