= Awaken the Tides =

Studio album by Malefice
- Released: July 15, 2011
- Genres: Melodic death metal, thrash metal, metalcore
- Length: 52:00
- Label: Metal Blade
- Producers: Justin Hill, Dan Weller

Malefice chronology
Dawn of Reprisal (2009)	Awaken the Tides (2011)	Five (2013)

Professional ratings
Review scores
Source	Rating
ThisIsNotAScene	7/10
Revolver	3/5 stars
Crave Metal TV	5/5 stars
Revolver	3/5 stars

Awaken the Tides is the third album by Malefice, released in July 2011 on Metal Blade Records. It was produced by Justin Hill and Dan Weller.

== Track listing ==
1. "Awaken the Tides" – 4:43
2. "Delirium" – 4:13
3. "Dead in the Water" – 3:49
4. "Minutes" – 5:29
5. "Baying for Blood" – 5:30
6. "Blessed / Cursed" – 4:22
7. "The Day the Sky Fell" – 5:06
8. "Out Numbered Out Gunned" – 3:52
9. "Flood of Red" – 5:02
10. "The Haunting" – 9:55
