= Mikee Goodman =

British singer

- Origin: Watford, United Kingdom
- Genres: Progressive rock, progressive metal, heavy metal, mathcore, avant-garde metal
- Occupations: Singer, songwriter, voice actor, director
- Years active: 1999–present
- Website: mikeegoodman.net

Mikee W. Goodman is a British singer, songwriter, director and voice actor. He is best known for being one of the main voice actors in the video game Disco Elysium and one of the two vocalists of the progressive metal band SikTh. He has also been a member of The Sad Season, Outside The Coma, The Painted Smiles and Primal Rock Rebellion (also featuring Iron Maiden guitarist Adrian Smith).

Goodman has cited Mike Patton, Jim Morrison and Leonard Cohen as influences.

== Career ==
Goodman has performed as a guest vocalist for Bat for Lashes, Cyclamen, Deathember, This Is Menace and Periphery.

In 2002, he wrote and directed a music video for the SikTh song "How May I Help You?", which was awarded best video of 2003 in Big Cheese Magazine. The video appeared on Scuzz MTV2 UK and MTV Asia. He has since directed other music videos which are accessible on Vimeo.

In 2017, he started work as a voice actor for several characters in ZA/UM's Disco Elysium, which was released in October 2019. Following his work on the game, he started his own agency called The Voice Elysium.

== Discography ==
=== With SikTh ===
- Let the Transmitting Begin (EP) (2002)
- How May I Help You? (EP) (2002)
- The Trees Are Dead & Dried Out Wait for Something Wild (2003)
- Scent of the Obscene (Single) (2003)
- Death of a Dead Day (2006)
- Flogging the Horses (EP) (2006)
- Opacities (EP) (2015)
- The Future in Whose Eyes? (2017)

=== With The Painted Smiles ===
- The Limbo (EP) (2011)

=== With Primal Rock Rebellion ===
- Awoken Broken (2012)

=== With Outside The Coma ===
- The Battle of Being (2015)

=== With The Sad Season ===
- It's All Too Loud in Here (EP) (2025)

=== Guest appearances ===
- This Is Menace, "No End in Sight" (2005)
- Bat for Lashes, "Fur and Gold" (2006)
- This Is Menace, "The Scene is Dead" (2007)
- Cyclamen, "Sleep Street" (2008)
- Deathember, "The Linear Act" (2011)
- Umpfel, "Fly Fly" (2015)
- Periphery, "Reptile" (2019)
- Red Method, "The Absent" (2019)
- Pitchshifter, "Un-United Kingdom" (2020)
