= Weight of the World (Young Guns song) =

2010 song performed by Young Guns

Single by Young Guns

from the album All Our Kings Are Dead
- Released: November 1, 2010
- Recorded: 2009–2010
- Genre: Rock
- Length: 4:10
- Label: Live Forever
- Songwriter(s): Gustav Woods
- Producer(s): Dan Weller; Justin Hill

Young Guns singles chronology
"Crystal Clear" (2010)	"Weight of the World" (2010)	"Stitches" (2010)

Weight of the World is a song by alternative rock band Young Guns. Initially recorded and released on their debut EP Mirrors in 2009, the band re-recorded it for their debut album, All Our Kings Are Dead the following year, and released as its fourth single. The song was a modest success, peaking at number 27 on the UK Rock Chart.

== Background ==
The song was initially written and recorded for the band's first studio release, the EP Mirrors, in 2009. With reviewers praising it for being a standout track, the band chose to re-record it for their first full-length album, All Our Kings Are Dead in 2010. The song was released as the fourth single for the album on November 1, 2010. The single release received even further re-recordings, with frontman Gustav Wood explaining that the band still hadn't quite been happy with either of the prior versions, stating

Now, we love our album to death, but we, like most bands, are perfectionists and knew that we could do the song a little more justice if we only had a tiny bit more time (especially if we were to release it as a single). We went back into the studio with Dan Weller once again and just tweaked, nipped, and tucked a bit so that we were a bit happier with where the song was at."

The band also performed an acoustic version of the song on Belgium television in 2011.

== Themes and composition ==
"Weight of the World" has been described as a "highly melodic" and high energy "adrenaline-charged" rock song, containing a "stadium sized chorus and angsty yet sing-along lyrics.

== Reception ==
Reception of the song was generally positive, with critics frequently praising the track's vocals and guitar-work. In Alter the Press's review of the song, they gave it a four out of five rating, praising the track's guitar riffs and stating the track was a "lively, favourable rock track that shows Gustav Wood's vocals is a good light, whilst the bands pounding sound backs up what is one of the albums highlights." Stereoboard similarly praised it for being "an ambitious slice of widescreen rock, combining instrumental muscle with a soaring chorus". The AU Review praised the song's sound for being catchy and inspiring sing-alongs, concluding that "everything from the opening riff, Gustav Woods' vocals and the way the pounding drums and guitar work complement each other, makes for an epic song". Multiple reviewers noted it as a standout track on Mirrors and All Our Kings Are Dead.

== Personnel ==
Band

- Gustav Wood – vocals
- Fraser Taylor – lead guitar
- John Taylor – rhythm guitar
- Simon Mitchell – bass guitar
- Ben Jolliffe – drums

Production

- Dan Weller – production
- Justin Hill – production

== Chart performance ==
Year	Single	Peak chart positions
Year	Single	UK Rock Chart
2010	"Weight of the World"	27
