= Mirrors (EP) =

EP by Young Guns
- Released: 22 June 2009
- Recorded: 2009
- Genre: Alternative rock
- Length: 15:49
- Label: Live Forever
- Producer: Dan Weller, Justn Hill

Young Guns chronology
Mirrors (2009)	All Our Kings Are Dead (2010)

Singles from Mirrors
- 1. "In the Night" Released: June 2009

Mirrors is the debut studio recording for British alternative rock band Young Guns. The four song EP was released on 22 June 2009. While initial sales were low, its release, coupled with subsequent touring, is credited with getting them the positions of opening live shows for Bon Jovi and Guns N' Roses that are credited for kick-starting the band's music career.

== Background and recording ==
While members of the band had been together dating back to 2003, during these years, they were more identified as just a number of musicians who shared a similar passion for music in the same London underground music scene, and did not form as a serious band until 2008. The band's lineup, upon becoming a formal band, consisted of Gustav Wood as the lead vocalist, Frasier and John Taylor both as guitarists, Simon Mitchell as the bassist, and Ben Jolliffe on drums. The band began playing local live shows at bars and small events featuring music from a variety of different music genre. They eventually began to garner more attention by securing spots in support of post-hardcore bands Funeral for a Friend and We Are the Ocean. This exposure granted them the opportunity to work with Dan Weller and Justin Hill, from the influential progressive metal band Sikth, as producers.

== Themes and composition ==
While the band's initial touring and producers were more related to the hardcore and progressive metal music scenes, the band chose to pursue a more straightforward, melodic rock sound with the EP.

== Release, promotion, and aftermath ==
The EP was released on 22 June 2009. A single to promote the release, "In the Night", was also released in the same month. The EP was not an immediate success, selling only 500 copies in its opening week, but the band continued to push forward with extensive touring. The band's EP and touring in support of it eventually caught the attention of popular Welsh rock band Lostprophets, who then asked the band Young Guns to open for them. This greatly raised the band's profile, which in turn lead to opening for Bon Jovi at their residency at The O2 Arena, and Guns N' Roses at that year's Reading Festival.

The track "Weight of the World" was later released on the band's debut album All Our Kings Are Dead in 2010.

== Critical reception ==
The EP received mixed reviews from critics, who often conceded that the release at least showed the band's potential. Rock Sound gave the EP a mixed review, describing it as "Not hugely original but not totally generic either", and that there were "some mighty rock riffs" but that they "don’t explode enough to officially make them stadium-worthy". The publication concluded that the EP was "Not ear-shattering just yet but with potential...Rock Sound is excited to hear what’s yet to come." The AU Review was more positive about the release, praising how the band was able to "squeeze in everything that makes them so great" in what was only a four song release. The review concluded with declaring the EP being a success in introducing listeners to the band, with the release being "an instantly captivating work", but that they'd "expect bigger and greater things from the band" in future releases. The Alter the Press review echoed similar sentiments of the release showing potential for the future, concluding that "Mirrors is a strong debut from a band with plenty of potential, however it's definitely a grower, especially if you are not a big fan of the style of music Young Guns play. Nevertheless the blend of heavy riffs and strong melodies are a good combination and Young Guns could have a winning formula."

The EP's release lead to the band winning Kerrang magazine's "Best Newcomer Award" for 2009.

== Track list ==
All lyrics are written by Gustav Wood; all music is composed by Young Guns

No.	Title	Length
1.	"Daughter of the Sea"	3:49
2.	"Weight of the World"	4:10
3.	"There Will Be Rain"	3:25
4.	"In the Night"	4:25
Total length:		15:49

== Personnel ==
Band

- Gustav Wood – vocals
- Fraser Taylor – lead guitar
- John Taylor – rhythm guitar
- Simon Mitchell – bass guitar
- Ben Jolliffe – drums

Production

- Dan Weller – production
- Justin Hill – production
