= Awoken Broken =

Studio album by Primal Rock Rebellion
- Released: 27 February 2012
- Recorded: 2011 at Search for Bliss Studios and Woodman Towers Studios, UK
- Genre: Heavy metal, progressive metal, alternative metal
- Label: Spinefarm Records
- Producer: Adrian Smith, Mikee Goodman

Singles from Awoken Broken
- 1. "No Place Like Home" Released: 6 February 2012

Awoken Broken is the debut album by the British heavy metal supergroup Primal Rock Rebellion, released on 27 February 2012 through Spinefarm Records. The song "I See Lights" was released as a free download on the project's official website on 2 January. On 26 January the music video for "No Place Like Home" was released along with confirmation that the song will be the album's first single. The album cover was created by Meats Meier.

== Track listing ==
The following is the track listing for Awoken Broken:

All tracks are written by Adrian Smith and Mikee Goodman

No.	Title	Length
1.	"No Friendly Neighbour"	4:53
2.	"No Place Like Home"	3.06
3.	"I See Lights"	4.59
4.	"Bright as a Fire"	6.21
5.	"Savage World"	3.38
6.	"Tortured Tone"	5.08
7.	"White Sheet Robes"	5.16
8.	"As Tears Come Falling from the Sky"	.47
9.	"Awoken Broken"	4.58
10.	"Search for Bliss"	4.13
11.	"Snake Ladders"	4.43
12.	"Mirror and the Moon"	5.04

Bonus-tracks in Japan:
No.	Title	Length
13.	"Scientist"	5:45
14.	"Mooncusser"	1:06

== Personnel ==
Primal Rock Rebellion

- Mikee Goodman – lead vocals
- Adrian Smith – guitar, bass guitar, vocals

Additional musicians

- Tarin Kerrey – backing vocals on three tracks
- Abi Fry – viola on most songs
- Dan "Loord" Foord – drums, percussion

Production

- Mikee Goodman – producer
- Adrian Smith – producer
- Simon Hanhart – mixing
