= Death of a Dead Day =

Studio album by Sikth
- Released: 6 June 2006
- Recorded: 2005
- Genres: Progressive metal; mathcore; avant-garde metal
- Length: 53:52
- Labels: Bieler Bros.; Victor
- Producer: Sikth

Sikth chronology
The Trees Are Dead & Dried Out Wait for Something Wild (2003)	Death of a Dead Day (2006)	Opacities (EP) (2015)

Singles from Death of a Dead Day
- 1. "Flogging the Horses" Released: 2 October 2006

Professional ratings
Review scores
Source	Rating
AllMusic	3/5 stars
Metal Injection	Recommended

Death of a Dead Day is the second studio album by British progressive metal band Sikth, as well as the last released before their 2008–2013 hiatus. It was released on 6 June 2006 (06/06/06) in the United States and 26 June in the United Kingdom; the first 4000 copies came with hand autographed fold out posters. It was released on vinyl by Basick Records as part of Record Store Day 2014.

A music video was released for opening track "Bland Street Bloom" while "Flogging the Horses" was released as an EP single.

== Lyrical themes ==
In a 2016 track-by-track guide with Louder Sound, vocalist and primary lyricist Mikee Goodman stated that Death of a Dead Day was the hardest album he made lyrically. The album's lyrical themes range from topics such as war ("Flogging the Horses"), anti-hate ("Sanguine Seas of Bigotry"), and the music industry ("Part of the Friction"), along with other topics and themes.

== Track listing ==
All lyrics are written by Mikee Goodman, except where noted; all music is composed by Dan Weller, Graham "Pin" Pinney, James Leach, and Dan "Loord" Foord.

No.	Title	Lyrics	Length
1.	"Bland Street Bloom"		5:41
2.	"Flogging the Horses"		3:33
3.	"Way Beyond the Fond Old River"		5:03
4.	"Summer Rain"		3:35
5.	"In This Light"		4:24
6.	"Sanguine Seas of Bigotry"		4:17
7.	"Mermaid Slur"		0:48
8.	"When the Moment's Gone"		5:59
9.	"Part of the Friction"		5:13
10.	"Where Do We Fall?"	Justin Hill, Goodman	4:40
11.	"Another Sinking Ship"		4:02
12.	"As the Earth Spins Round"		6:37
Total length:			53:47

Japanese bonus track
No.	Title	Length
13.	"Each Other and Ourselves"	4:45
Total length:		58:31

10th Anniversary Edition (CDVILED628)
No.	Title	Length
13.	"Flogging the Horses" (Demo)	4:52
14.	"Part of the Friction" (Demo)	5:12
15.	"Where Do We Fall?" (Demo)	5:09
Total length:		69:06

== Personnel ==
Sikth

- Mikee Goodman – vocals
- Justin Hill – vocals
- Dan Weller – guitars
- Graham "Pin" Pinney – guitars
- James Leach – bass
- Dan "Loord" Foord – drums, percussion

Production

- Produced by Sikth
- Mixed and engineered by Matt Laplant
- Additional mixing on "Mermaid Slur" by Simon Hanhart at Spare Room Studios
- Post-production by Weller and Hill
- Mastered by Mike Fuller at Fullersound Miami, Florida
- Artwork & design by Tim Fox
- Photography by Matthew Swig
