= Malefice =

British metal band

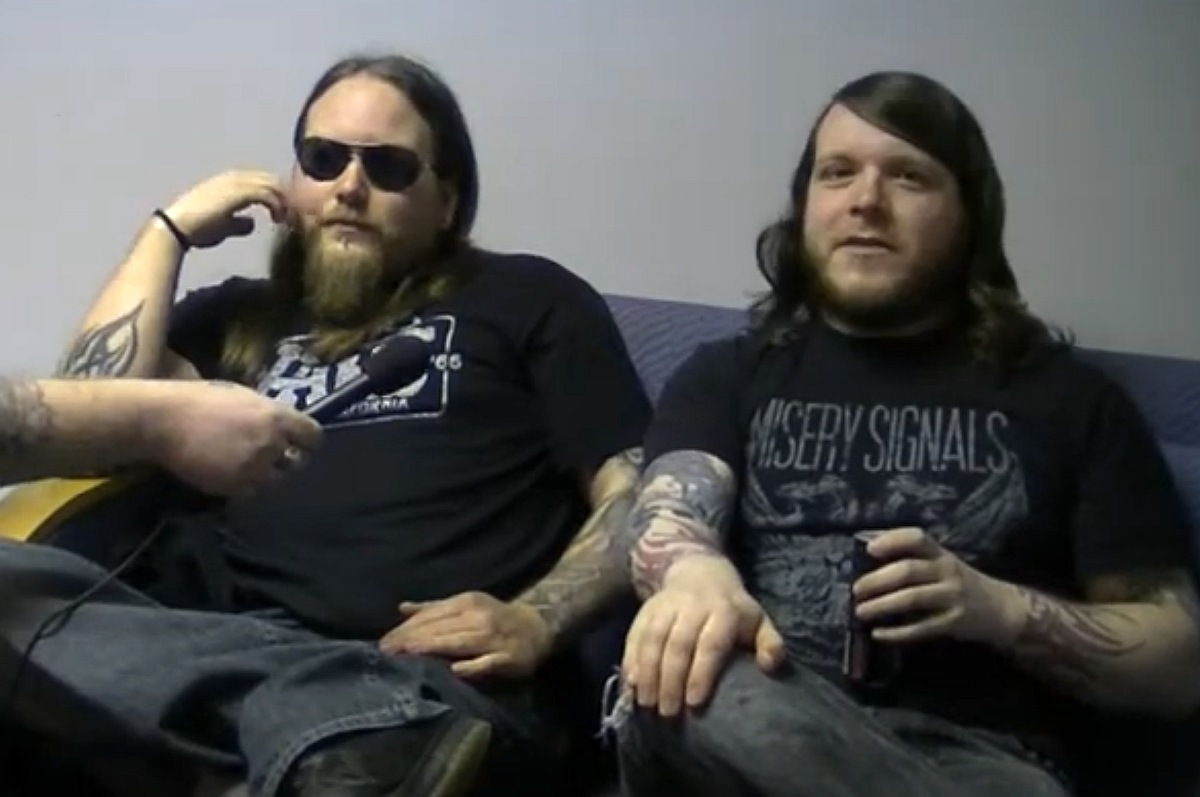
- Malefice interviewed in 2010

Background information
- Origin: Reading, Berkshire, England
- Genres: Thrash metal; melodic death metal; metalcore
- Years active: 2003–2017
- Labels: Anticulture 2007–2008; Metal Blade 2008–2012; Transcend 2012–
- Members: Dale Butler; Ben Symons; Andrew Wilson; Tom Hynes; Chris Allan-Whyte
- Past members: Craig Fenner; Craig Thomas; Lloyd Griffiths; Alex Vuskans

Malefice was an English metal band from Reading, Berkshire, formed in 2003. They released four studio albums before disbanding in 2017.

== History ==
The original members were Dale Butler, Alex Vuskans, Craig Thomas and Craig Fenner. They began writing songs and opened a four-band bill charity show at the Rivermead Centre in Reading. Their fanbase began to grow. Through constant touring around Reading and London, they signed a distribution deal for their first EP, Relentless, through Hangman's Joke.

In early 2007, they signed to Anticulture Records. They recorded their debut album, Entities, with producers Dan Weller and Justin Hill of WellerHill, at one of the Craigs' parents' home in South Wales. The band announced their split from the Anticulture label via their Myspace page.

Since the album's release, they have supported the SikTh tour as well as DevilDriver and God Forbid and played shows with Soulfly. In January 2008, they played a show at the Wedgewood Rooms in Portsmouth, recorded and planned to be released on DVD. In June 2008, Malefice opened the second stage of the Download Festival on Saturday.

In November 2008, Malefice announced through their Myspace page that they had signed a worldwide deal with Metal Blade Records. In March 2009, they released their second album, Dawn of Reprisal. On 12 September, they played at Butserfest alongside Go:Audio and We Are the Ocean. On 26 September 2009, they played in India at the annual cultural fest Rendezvous of IIT Delhi.

In March 2010, the band featured on the BBC TV show The Bubble. The following month, it was announced that drummer Craig Thomas had left the band, replaced with Chris Allan. Malefice played a 30-minute set on Saturday evening on the Jager stage at Sonisphere UK. In 2012, they recorded the song "Omega" with footballer Marcus Hahnemann for the Jägermeister UK "Ice Cold Session".

In June 2012, the band signed to Transcend Music.

In March 2017, the group disbanded to pursue solo careers.

== Musical style ==
Laut.de described the group's sound as a combination of melodic death metal, thrash metal and metalcore. Conversely, Rock Hard said they had "not much in common" with metalcore, instead drawing comparisons with Lamb of God, DevilDriver, Gojira and Hacride. Exclaim! compared them to Nightrage.

== Band members ==
=== Current ===
- Dale Butler – vocals (2003–2017)
- Ben Symons – guitar (2003–2017)
- Tom Hynes – bass (2006–2017)
- Andrew Wilson – guitar (2011–2017)
- James Cook – drums (2014–2017)

=== Former ===
- Lloyd Griffiths – bass (2003–2006)
- Craig Thomas – drums (2003–2010)
- Alex Vuskans – guitar (2003–2011)
- Chris Allan – drums (2010–2014)

== Discography ==
=== Studio albums and EPs ===
- 2006: Relentless (Hangmans Joke)
- 2007: Entities (Anticulture Records)
- 2009: Dawn of Reprisal (Metal Blade Records)
- 2011: Awaken the Tides (Metal Blade Records)
- 2013: Five (Transcend Music)

=== Promotional videos ===
- 2006: "The Force That You Fear"
- 2007: "Risen Through the Ashes"
- 2009: "An Architect of Your Demise"
- 2011: "Awaken the Tides"
- 2012: "Omega" (feat. Marcus Hahnemann)
- 2013: "V"
- 2013: "Blueprints"
- 2014: "Heroes"
