= Bones (Young Guns album) =

Studio album by Young Guns
- Released: 3 February 2012
- Studio: Karma Sound Studios, Thailand
- Genre: Alternative rock, hard rock, alternative metal
- Length: 38:53
- Label: Live Forever (UK); Wind-up (US); PIAS (EU)
- Producer: Dan Weller

Young Guns chronology
All Our Kings Are Dead (2010)	Bones (2012)	Ones and Zeros (2015)

Singles from Bones
- 1. "Learn My Lesson" Released: 13 October 2011; 2. "Bones" Released: 6 February 2012; 3. "Dearly Departed" Released: 11 June 2012; 4. "Towers (On My Way)" Released: 27 August 2012; 5. "You Are Not (Lonely)" Released: 26 November 2012

Bones is the second studio album by English alternative rock band Young Guns. It was released on in the UK on 3 February 2012 and in the US on 4 September 2012 through Wind-up Records and PIAS Recordings. Five singles were released from the album, the most successful being the second (first single released in the US), "Bones", which topped the Billboard Active Rock charts in May 2013.

== Writing and recording ==
The band's first album, All Our Kings Are Dead, was created largely as a method to continue touring, as the band felt they needed more than the few songs they had from their previous EP, the Mirrors EP. The releases were seen largely as a medium to support their live performances, the band's largest focus at the time. After touring with these two releases for more than two years, the band realized they had built up a considerable fanbase, and decided to write a second album.

Recording for the album started in 2011. The album was recorded at Karma Sound Studios in Thailand with the former SikTh guitarist Dan Weller. Frontman Gustav Wood stated that the album thematically revolved around the concepts "finding inner strength" and the importance of "seizing the moment". He cited the track "Brother in Arms" as a specific example of this, with it being written in regards to "enjoying being alive" during their time in Thailand recording the album.

== Release and promotion ==
Five singles were released from the album. The first single from the album, "Learn My Lesson", was first played on Zane Lowe's BBC Radio 1 show on 13 October 2011 as his Hottest Record in the world, and was made available for download shortly after. In December 2011, a video was posted online for "Brother in Arms". On 2 January 2012, "Bones" received its first broadcast play on Daniel P Carter's Rock Show on Radio 1. On 21 May 2012, the music video for "Dearly Departed", was released, with the single itself being released on 11 June. "Towers (On My Way)" was released as a single on 27 August 2012. On 22 October 2012, the music video for "You Are Not" was released with the single itself released on 26 November.

The album charted at no. 19 in the U.K. Album Chart. The title track was used as one of the theme songs for WrestleMania 29.

== Reception ==
Professional ratings
Aggregate scores
Source	Rating
Metacritic	74/100
Review scores
Source	Rating
AllMusic	3/5 stars
Alternative Music Hub	4.5/5 stars
BBC	positive
Drowned in Sound	6/10 stars
Sputnikmusic	3.5/5 stars
Thrash Hits	4/6 stars

Reception for the album was generally positive, with the album receiving an aggregate score of 74 out of a 100, out of 8 reviews, from Metacritic. Allmusic awarded the album 3 stars with its review by Jon O'Brien stating "Bones is undeniably still a solid follow-up that should consolidate their second-tier status, but they'll have to change the record next time around if they want to move into U.K.'s alt-metal big league."

== Track listing ==
All music is composed by Young Guns.

No.	Title	Length
1.	"I Was Born, I Have Lived, I Will Surely Die"	3:58
2.	"Dearly Departed"	3:12
3.	"Bones"	3:13
4.	"Towers (On My Way)"	2:39
5.	"Hymn for All I've Lost"	1:06
6.	"You Are Not (Lonely)"	3:56
7.	"Brother in Arms"	3:12
8.	"Learn My Lesson"	3:20
9.	"Everything Ends"	4:11
10.	"Interlude"	1:39
11.	"Headlights"	4:05
12.	"Broadfields"	4:22

iTunes bonus tracks
No.	Title	Length
13.	"Say It Ain't So (Weezer Cover)"	3:58
14.	"Polly (Nirvana Cover)"	3:17
15.	"There Will Be Rain"	4:16

== Personnel ==
Young Guns

- Gustav Wood – lead vocals
- Fraser Taylor – lead guitar
- John Taylor – rhythm guitar, backing vocals
- Simon Mitchell – bass guitar
- Ben Jolliffe – drums, percussion, backing vocals

Production

- Dan Weller – production, mixing
