= Primal Rock Rebellion =

British heavy metal band

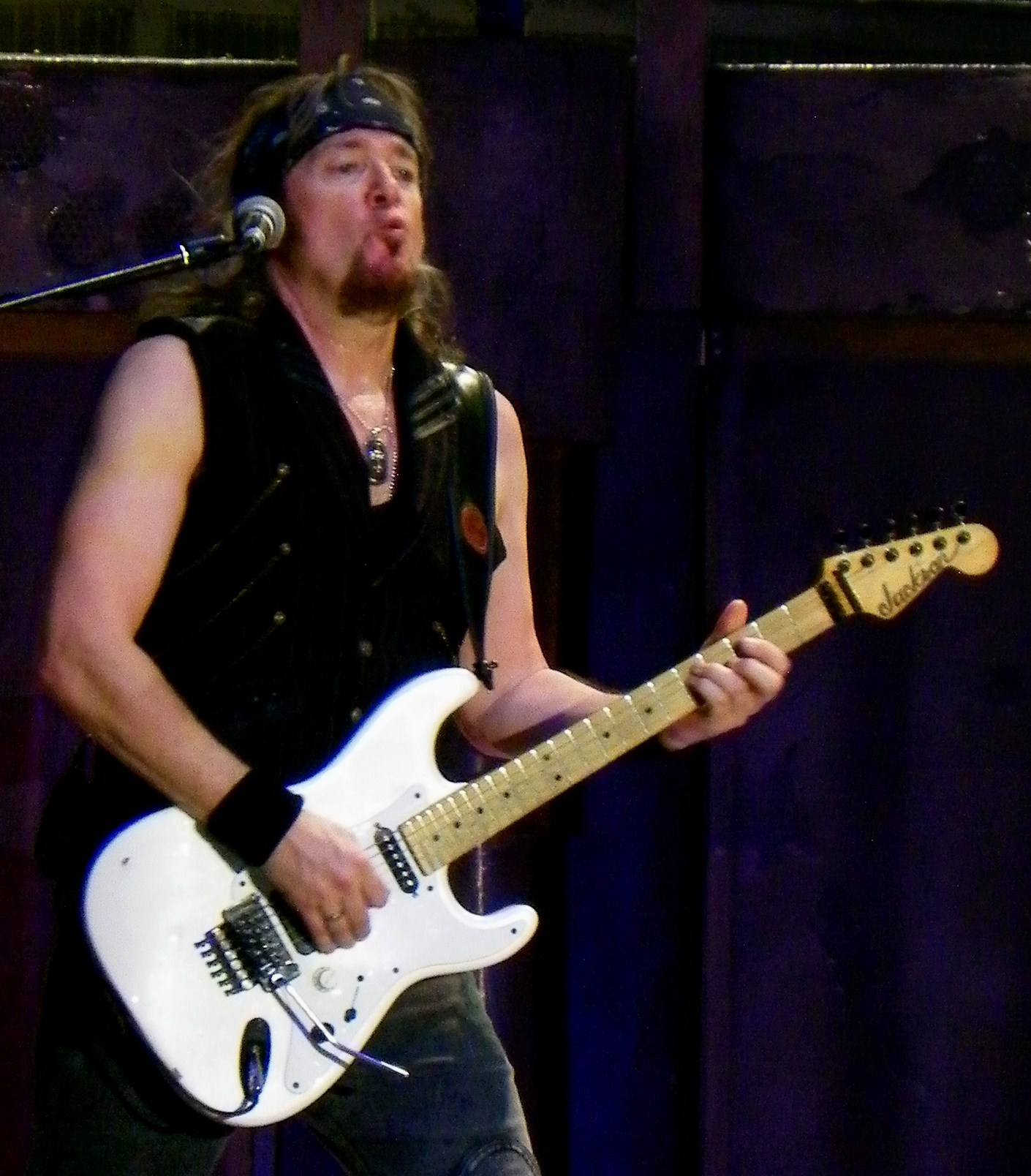
- Guitarist Adrian Smith

Background information
- Origin: London, England
- Genres: Heavy metal, progressive metal, alternative metal
- Years active: 2011–2012 (hiatus)
- Labels: Spinefarm Records
- Members: Adrian Smith; Mikee Goodman

Primal Rock Rebellion are a British heavy metal supergroup from London, England, consisting of Adrian Smith (Iron Maiden) and Mikee Goodman (SikTh). The band's debut album, Awoken Broken, was released on 27 February 2012, with one song, "I See Lights", released as a free download on the project's official website on 2 January. On 26 January 2012, the music video for "No Place Like Home" was released on the band's website along with the announcement that it will be the album's first single. The album, Awoken Broken, was released on 27 February 2012, through Spinefarm Records.

Primal Rock Rebellion has been on hiatus since Awoken Broken was released. It has never played any live shows - a debut show was announced, but it was later cancelled.

Mikee Goodman revealed in 2025 that he would "jump at the chance" to work with Adrian Smith again. He also revealed that Primal Rock Rebellion was supposed to tour.

== Discography ==
Studio albums

- Awoken Broken (2012)

== Personnel ==
- Mikee Goodman – lead vocals
- Adrian Smith – guitar, bass guitar, vocals

Session musicians

- Dan Foord – drums
