= Young Guns (band) =

English alternative rock band

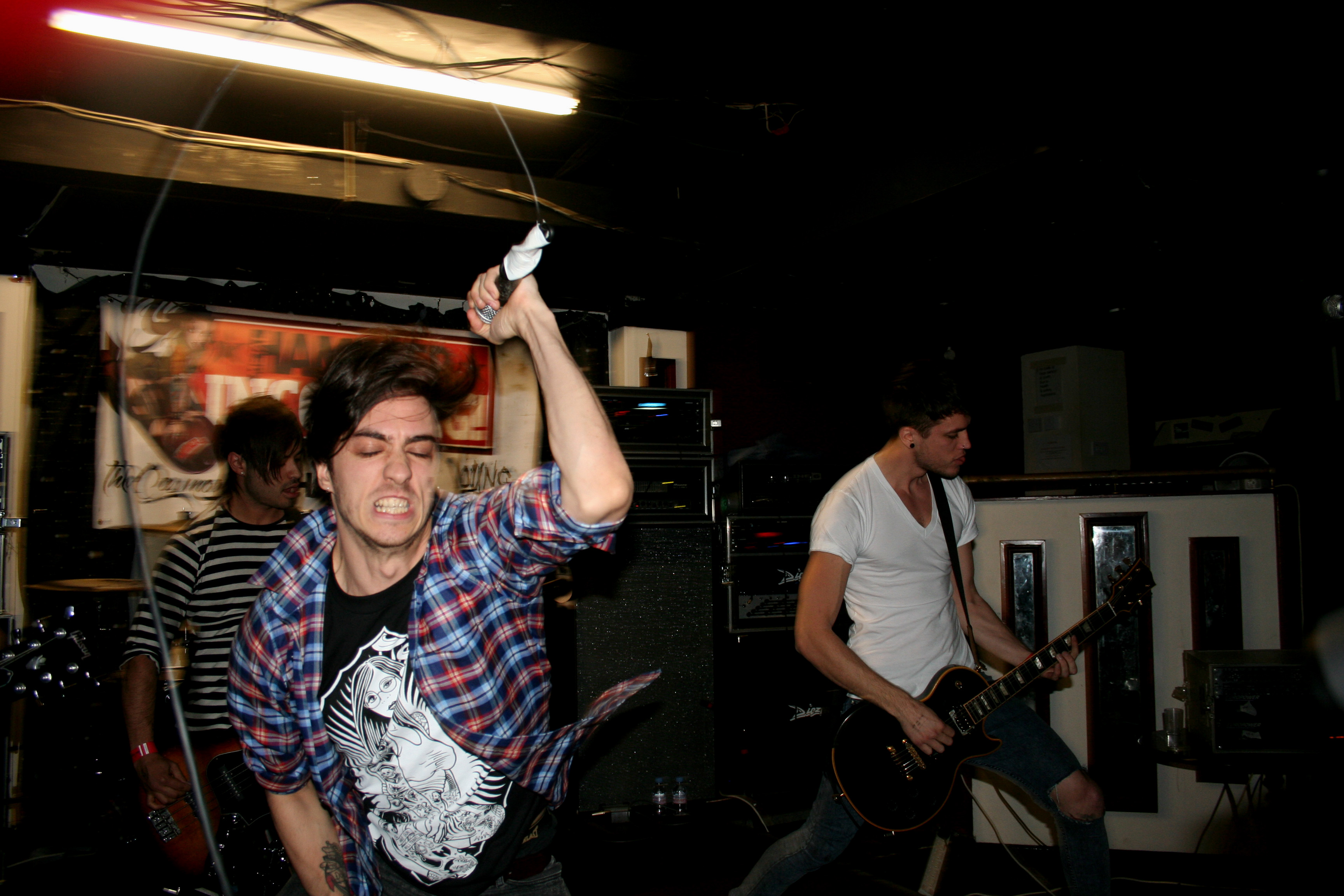
- Young Guns in 2009.

Background information
- Origin: High Wycombe, Buckinghamshire, England
- Genres: Post-hardcore; alternative rock; alternative metal; hard rock
- Years active: 2008–present
- Labels: Live Forever; Wind-up; PIAS; Virgin EMI
- Members: Gustav Wood; Fraser Taylor; John Taylor; Simon Mitchell; Ben Jolliffe
- Past members: Chris Kamrada

Young Guns are an English alternative rock band from High Wycombe, Buckinghamshire. The members, working with each other in various musical interests throughout the 2000s, formally formed the band in 2008, and rose to prominence after their debut EP, Mirrors, earned them spots opening live shows for Bon Jovi and Guns N' Roses. Their debut album, All Our Kings Are Dead, on 12 July 2010. Their second album, Bones, was released in February 2012. Their single "Bones" reached no. 1 on the Billboard Active Rock charts in the US in May 2013. Their third album, Ones and Zeros, was released on 9 June 2015. The band's fourth album, Echoes, was released on 16 September 2016.

== History ==
=== Mirrors EP and All Our Kings Are Dead (2008–2010) ===
While members of the band had been together dating back to 2003, during these years, they were more identified as just a number of musicians who shared a similar passion for music in the same London underground music scene, and did not form as a serious band until 2008. The band's lineup, upon becoming a formal band, consisted of Gustav Wood as the lead vocalist, Fraser and John Taylor both as guitarists, Simon Mitchell as the bassist, and Ben Jolliffe on drums. The band began playing local live shows at bars and small events featuring music from a variety of different music genre. They eventually began to garner more attention by securing spots in support of post-hardcore bands Funeral for a Friend and We Are the Ocean. This exposure granted them the opportunity to work with Dan Weller and Justin Hill, from the influential progressive metal band Sikth, as producers.

The resulting work, the band's debut release, the EP Mirrors, was released on 22 June 2009. A single to promote the release, "In the Night", was also released in the same month. Despite touring and working with people from the hardcore and progressive metal music scene, the release contained more of a straightforward, melodic rock sound. The EP was not an immediate success, selling only 500 copies in its opening week, but the band continued to push forward with extensive touring. Mirroring the EP's sound, the band began touring with more mainstream rock bands, eventually leading to popular Welsh rock band Lostprophets approaching Young Guns to open for them. The touring, couple with positive coverage in the press, including a nomination from Kerrang magazine for "Best Newcomer Award" for 2009, greatly raised the band's public profile, leading to an opening spot for Bon Jovi at their residency at The O2 Arena, and Guns N' Roses at that year's Reading Festival.

The band's unexpectedly quick rise to popularity left them in a rush to create more music to sustain their frequent touring. In January 2010, the band began work on their first full album. The band once again chose to work with Weller as a producer, and recorded their first full album while still continuing their extensive touring. Their first order was to record and release a single right away to capitalize on their recent high-profile live shows, which ended up being the track "Winter Kiss", released in the same month. The song was well-received, with BBC Radio 1 DJ Zane Lowe praising it as "The Hottest Record in the World". Further singles "Sons of Apathy" and "Crystal Clear" were released in April and July respectively while the band worked on completing the album. The debut album, All Our Kings Are Dead, was released under their own label called Live Forever on 10 July 2010 and peaked at No. 43 in the UK Albums Chart, and No. 3 in both the UK Rock and Indie album charts. Additional singles "Stitches" and "Weight of the World" were also released in promotion of the album. While all the singles received moderate radio play, both "Crystal Clear" and "Weight of the World" managed to chart, peaking at ninth and twenty-seventh respectively on the UK Rock Singles chart.

To promote the album's release, the band played at some of the UK's largest festivals, including Download Festival and opening the main stage of the Reading Festival. This was preceded by a European tour supporting Danko Jones and their own UK Tour. In February 2011, the band supported All Time Low with Yellowcard on another European Tour which ended in the UK, visiting venues such as the O2 Academy Brixton. On 10 July 2011, the album was re-released as All Our Kings Are Dead: Gold Edition, including a bonus DVD containing three acoustic sessions, three live videos, a documentary and the music videos for all five singles.

=== Bones (2011–2013) ===
The band traveled to Karma Sound Studios in Thailand to start work on a second studio album in July 2011, again working with Weller as a producer. The first single from the sessions, "Learn My Lesson", was released four months later in October 2011, being debuted on Zane Lowe's Radio 1 show. The following month, the band announced the new album would be titled Bones, and would be released on 6 February 2012 in Europe. After the initial European release, the band proceeded to tour across Europe for six months while working on securing a distribution deal for the album in the US - which they eventually did with Wind-Up Records. The first leg of the tour was labeled the Bare Bones Club Tour; contrary to the band's large stadium shows with Bon Jovi, the initial shows were a number of intimate shows at small locations that the band had played in their earlier years. Bones was released in the US on 4 September 2012.

Prior to the US release, the band had released a second single, "Bones", 20 February 2012. The song, the band's first single in the US, started off modestly in Europe, but upon release in the US, steadily grew until, after 32 weeks on the chart, topped the US Billboard Active Rock chart. The song also hit number 2 on the UK Rock charts. With the song being a massive hit, the band spent over two years touring in support of the album in total., including a North American tour with rock band Seether in late 2012, and additional touring with 10 Years, Bullet For My Valentine and Halestorm in 2013. Additional promotion came in the form of the song "Bones" being chosen as one of the main theme songs for WWE's 29th annual Wrestlemania event, WrestleMania 29, on 7 April 2013. Further singles "Dearly Departed", "Towers (On My Way)", and "You Are Not (Lonely)" were also released, the latter two charting more modestly at 31 and 33 on the US Active Rock charts.

=== Ones and Zeros (2014–2015) ===
It was announced in February 2014 that the band had signed to the Virgin EMI record label and that they would be flying to San Francisco to work on the follow-up to Bones with the producer Dan the Automator. Unfortunately, while the band found the sessions interesting, they ultimately felt their sound was incompatible Dan the Automator's hip-hop background and approach to music, with the band instead choosing to work with Steve Osborne. The band spent 6 months straight on writing and recording the album, without touring, a rarity for the band. In August 2014, the band announced their plan on releasing a new album in early 2015, and debuted the first single for their third album, "I Want Out", on BBC Radio 1 UK Zane Lowe's Hottest Record The single hit number one on the iTunes Rock Chart, and eventually peaked at number 16 on the Billboard Mainstream Rock chart. Later in the month, a music video for "I Want Out" was also released. Work on the album continued through the rest of the year, with the band taking occasional breaks to perform live shows, most notably supporting Bring Me the Horizon for a sold-out show at Wembley Arena in London in December.

In February 2015, the band announced that the album's name would be Ones and Zeros, and that its release was pushed back to 8 June 2015. The band started the promotion for the album at the same time, releasing the second single "Speaking In Tongues". and embarking on that years Kerrang! Tour. Following that, they began a tour of their own around the UK. In April 2015 they began touring with Breaking Benjamin for the first leg of their US Tour with dates set through August. The band wrapped up their touring in support of the album in October 2015. Shortly after, the band amicably parted with their drummer, Ben Jolliffe, stating that Jolliffe and the band were heading in "different directions", later being revealed that he wanted to focus on his family life. The band recruited a new drummer, Chris Kamrada, and immediately began working on writing new material through the end of the year.

=== Echoes and future releases (2016–present) ===
The band, presented with the opportunity to work with music producer David Bendeth, decided to move quickly into recording another album, with sessions starting in February 2016 at the House of Loud studio. The sessions wrapped up in May 2016, and the band announced that the album was tentatively scheduled for release around August or September. To promote the release, the album's first single, "Bulletproof", was released in June 2016, while the second single, "Mad World", was released the next month. Additionally, the band toured as part of the 2016 iteration of the Vans Warped Tour through August. Their fourth album, titled Echoes, was released on 16 September 2016. In the months following the album's release, the band alternated touring between the United States and the UK. Wood states he would ideally like to start writing new material for a fifth studio album towards the end of 2016, but not necessarily have an album to release right away.

The band spent 2017 split between touring and creating new music. The band toured the UK with Lower Than Atlantis in March, and did their own acoustic tour in the latter half of 2017. As of October 2017, Wood reported that the band had written 18 or 19 songs, planned on writing 5 or 6 more, and had 4 song far enough along that they played their demos over the speakers before and after their live performances. He reiterated that the band plans on releasing new music in 2018, but was unsure if it would be in the form of an album, an EP, or a series of singles. No release occurred in 2018, but as of April 2019, Wood and Taylor spoke of still actively writing new music for the band. As of 2020, the material still remained unreleased and without any specific plans for release, though the band planned to remain active, touring and playing All Our Kings Are Dead in its entirety for its tenth anniversary, until lockdown happened and the festivals they were due to play were cancelled. On 7 July 2022, Young Guns played their first show in almost 5 years at The Fighting Cocks, followed by a performance the next day at 2000trees festival.

== Musical style and influences ==
The band has often been described as a general rock band that arose with the rest of the wave of British rock bands, but have also been labeled as "melodic rock" and hard rock.

Wood reflected on the labels given to the band over time in 2013, stating:

When we started the band...We’d play with like tech metal bands or pop punk bands and be stuck on all of these different bills and we just never seemed to find a group of bands that we sonically worked with...So, people were always putting labels on us and we were kind of surprised by all of this, because as far as we’re concerned, we’re just a rock band. We’re just a five piece rock band. We write melodic rock songs, it’s not like we are re-inventing the wheel. People have always struggled to kind of pigeon hole us I think. That seems to still be continuing. We’ve had a degree of connection at Active Rock radio and that’s amazing, but I don’t consider us an Active Rock band. I just consider us a rock band. I’m happy to be at the forefront of the New Wave of British Heavy Metal if that’s what people say, but I don’t consider us a metal band. I don’t really even want us to be limited to being a British band. I just want us to be a band, but whatever anyone else wants to call us is fine by me.

Wood commented on the band's approach to music and sound again in 2016, stating:

I think we play a relatively American minded style of music but I think we’re British and that seems to do something to it that makes people think this is different...I think also that at the moment the world has so many labels, pop punk, hardcore, metal. The fact that we’re just a rock band seems to help us stand apart. Especially at a festival like this with pop punk and ska bands there aren’t as many of us around...We’re almost different by just not aligning ourselves.

== Band members ==
Current

- Gustav Wood – lead vocals (2008–present)
- Fraser Taylor – lead guitar (2008–present)
- John Taylor – rhythm guitar, backing vocals (2008–present)
- Simon Mitchell – bass guitar (2008–present)
- Ben Jolliffe – drums, percussion, backing vocals (2008–2015, 2020–present)

Former members

- Chris Kamrada – drums, percussion (2015–2017)

== Discography ==
- All Our Kings Are Dead (2010)
- Bones (2012)
- Ones and Zeros (2015)
- Echoes (2016)
