= Let the Transmitting Begin =

Let the Transmitting Begin EP

EP by Sikth
- Released: 2002 (UK); 26 July 2004(Japan)
- Recorded: 2002
- Genres: Progressive metal, mathcore, avant-garde metal
- Labels: Infernal Records (UK); Victor Entertainment (Japan)
- Producer: Colin Richardson

Sikth chronology
Let the Transmitting Begin EP (2002)	How May I Help You? EP (2002)

Alternative cover
- Japanese edition

Let the Transmitting Begin EP is the debut EP by metal band Sikth. It was originally released 2002 in the UK then re-released in Japan 2004 with extra tracks. The second CD of the UK pressing was recorded live for Mary Anne Hobbs' BBC Radio One Rock Show.

== Track listing ==
UK Release
No.	Title	Music	Length
1.	"Such the Fool"	CD1	3:18
2.	"If You Weren't So Perfect"	CD1	3:30
3.	"Hold My Finger"	CD1	3:37
4.	"Pussyfoot" (Live at the BBC)	CD2	3:05
5.	"Hold My Finger" (Live at the BBC)	CD2	3:57
6.	"Such the Fool" (Live at the BBC)	CD2	3:15
Total length:			20:40

Japanese Edition
No.	Title	Length
7.	"Skies of the Millennium Night" (Live in London)	5:45
8.	"Wait for Something Wild" (Live in London)	5:09
9.	"Suffice - Emerson Outro (Live in London)" (Live in London)	7:18
10.	"Can't We All Dream? (No Need for Vultures Remix)" (Remixed by Mikee Goodman)	7:22
Total length:		46:12
