= How May I Help You? =

EP by Sikth
- Released: 23 September 2002
- Recorded: May 2002
- Genres: Progressive metal, mathcore, avant-garde metal
- Length: 14:11 (music)
- Label: Unparalleled Carousel/Gut
- Producer: John Fryer

Sikth chronology
Let the Transmitting Begin (2002)	How May I Help You? (2002)	The Trees Are Dead & Dried Out Wait for Something Wild (2003)

How May I Help You? is the second EP released by progressive metal act Sikth. The EP features the title track, Suffice and an experimental cover of Nick Cave's "Tupelo".

== Background ==
=== How May I Help You? ===
"A chapter of a fictional story... I have wanted to create something like this and really bring it to life for so long now - something that enables me to introduce a variety of characters which I wouldn't otherwise be able to work with. This particular chapter focusses on a boy called Rodney, who's starting to grow up. He's the kind of person who can't seem to let his emotions out. He's always getting picked on and pushed around, which really winds him up. But even then he just can't give vent to his feelings. When he finally gets a girlfriend, it seems as though none of that really matters any more - he starts to feel happy for the very first time. But then it all goes horribly wrong, which is too much for him and he flips out. His anger has at last been unleashed, but it's done him no favours at all..." Mikee Goodman.

The song was made into an animated video, which was written, directed and produced by Mikee Goodman, one of the band's vocalists. The video won the best video award in The Big Cheese Magazine, as well as reaching number 1 on MTV UK and being an A-list video on MTV Asia.

=== Suffice ===
"The first ever SikTh song, revamped here from its original incarnation. A piece of SikTh history. The idea was to get across a positive message. It starts at a point where everything is going well and you're feeling good about life. then everything seems to go wrong all at once - thoughts of escape go through your mind, a thousand negative thoughts spin around your head, then a strong positive voice inside makes itself heard, hoping for a better tomorrow, however bad today may be..." Mikee Goodman.

== Track listing ==
No.	Title	Length
1.	"How May I Help You?"	3:46
2.	"Suffice"	3:14
3.	"Tupelo" (Nick Cave and the Bad Seeds cover)	7:11

Bonus music video
No.	Title	Length
4.	"(If You Weren't So) Perfect"	3:33
