= All Our Kings Are Dead =

Studio album by Young Guns
- Released: July 12, 2010
- Genre: Hard rock, alternative rock, melodic hardcore
- Length: 51:10
- Label: Live Forever
- Producer: Dan Weller

Young Guns chronology
Mirrors (2009)	All Our Kings Are Dead (2010)	Bones (2012)

Singles from All Our Kings Are Dead
- 1. "Winter Kiss" Released: 25 January 2010; 2. "Sons of Apathy" Released: 13 April 2010; 3. "Crystal Clear" Released: 26 July 2010; 4. "Weight of the World" Released: 1 November 2010; 5. "Stitches" Released: 28 March 2011

All Our Kings Are Dead is the debut studio album by English alternative rock band Young Guns. It was released on 12 July 2010 and includes the singles "Winter Kiss", "Sons of Apathy", "Crystal Clear" and "Stitches", as well as "Weight of the World".

== Writing and recording ==
The album was influenced by Finch's What It Is to Burn (2002) and Lostprophets's Start Something (2004).

== Release and promotion ==
The album was first released on 12 July 2010. The album entered the UK Album Charts at #43, and the UK Independent Album Charts at #5 and #15 respectively. To promote the album, throughout the release year, and into 2011, the band released five singles from the album - "Winter Kiss", "Sons of Apathy", "Crystal Clear", "Stitches", and "Weight of the World". On 10 July 2011, the album was re-released as All Our Kings Are Dead: Gold Edition, including both the original album as well as a bonus DVD containing three acoustic sessions, three live videos, a documentary, and the music videos for all five singles.

== Critical reception ==
Professional ratings
Review scores
Source	Rating
AllMusic	3/5 stars
Alter the Press	4/5 stars
BBC	positive
Rock Sound	8/10 stars

The album received generally positive reviews. AllMusic stated that "Gustav Wood's passionate soaring vocals and heartfelt lyrics ensure that Young Guns offer enough variation to stand out from their counterparts".

== Track list ==
All music written by Young Guns, all lyrics written by Gustav Wood.

No.	Title	Length
1.	"Sons of Apathy"	4:18
2.	"Crystal Clear"	3:29
3.	"Meter & Verse"	3:42
4.	"Weight of the World"	4:21
5.	"D.O.A."	3:49
6.	"Stitches"	3:41
7.	"Winter Kiss"	4:35
8.	"Elements"	3:25
9.	"After the War"	4:17
10.	"Endless Grey"	3:44
11.	"At the Gates"	4:19
12.	"Beneath the Waves"	7:30

All Our Kings Are Dead: Gold Edition (Disc 2) DVD
No.	Title	Length
13.	"Don't Look Back, Just Keep Moving (Documentary)"
14.	"Stitches (Live Acoustic Session)"
15.	"Weight Of The World (Live Acoustic Session)"
16.	"Meter & Verse (Live Acoustic Session)"
17.	"Stitches (Live At The Electric Ballroom, Camden)"
18.	"Winter Kiss (Live At The Electric Ballroom, Camden)"
19.	"Weight Of The World (Live At The Electric Ballroom, Camden)"

== Personnel ==
Young Guns

- Gustav Wood - lead vocals
- Fraser Taylor - lead guitar
- John Taylor - rhythm guitar, backing vocals
- Simon Mitchell - bass guitar
- Ben Jolliffe - drums, percussion, backing vocals

Other contributors

- Dan Weller – production, mixing
- Ciaran Cahill – additional string arrangements
- Dick Beetham – mastering
- Paul Jackson – artwork
- Mark James – management
- Andy Snape – management
