= Bones (Young Guns song) =

Single by Young Guns

from the album Bones
- Released: 6 February 2012
- Recorded: Karma Sound Studios, Thailand
- Genre: Alternative rock; nu metal
- Length: 3:13
- Label: Wind-up; PIAS
- Songwriter: Gustav Wood
- Producer: Dan Weller

Young Guns singles chronology
"Learn My Lesson" (2011)	"Bones" (2012)	"Dearly Departed" (2012)

Music video
- "Bones" on YouTube

"Bones" is a single by English alternative rock band Young Guns. The song was the band's first single released in the US, and their second overall single from their second album Bones. The track was a huge success for the band; a year after it was released, managed to top the Billboard Active Rock charts in May 2013.

== Background ==
The music video for the song was directed by Tim Mattia, and features the band performing in black and white against a London backdrop with many shapes and silhouettes forming. A young woman also appears in the footage, who is not the same person who is on the album's cover, but is meant to "mirror" the album's artwork.

The song was one of the official theme songs for WWE WrestleMania 29.

== Sound and composition ==
Guitarist John Taylor states the song was recorded using a Fender Jaguar Baritone Custom guitar.

== Critical reception ==
The song was generally well received by critics. The Sputnikmusic staff review referred to it as a standout track on the Bones album, referring to it as a "massive title track, which contains that difficult to pinpoint atmosphere right from its opening notes... Not to mention a rousing call & response chorus, and a fantastic guitar solo and accompanying drum barrage." The song was nominated for "best single" in the 2012 annual Kerrang Awards.

== Personnel ==
Band

- Gustav Wood – lead vocals
- Fraser Taylor – lead guitar
- John Taylor – rhythm guitar, backing vocals
- Simon Mitchell – bass
- Ben Jolliffe – drums, percussion, backing vocals

Production

- Dan Weller – production, mixing

== Charts ==
=== Weekly charts ===
Weekly chart performance for "Bones"
Chart (2013)	Peak position
UK Rock & Metal (Official Charts)	2
UK Indie (Official Charts)	14
US Hot Rock & Alternative Songs (Billboard)	37
US Rock & Alternative Airplay (Billboard)	14

=== Year-end charts ===
Year-end chart performance for "Bones"
Chart (2013)	Position
US Rock Airplay (Billboard)	49
