= Sikth =

British progressive metal band

- Origin: Watford, Hertfordshire, England
- Genres: Progressive metal, mathcore, avant-garde metal
- Years active: 1999–2008, 2013–present
- Labels: Infernal Records, Unparalleled Carousel, Gut Records, (UK), Victor Entertainment (Japan), Bieler Bros. Records (USA)/World
- Members: Dan Weller; Graham Pinney; Mikee Goodman; Dan Foord; James Leach; Justin Hill
- Past members: Tristan Lucey; Jamie Hunter; Joe Rosser

Sikth (also typeset as SikTh) are an English progressive metal band from Watford, Hertfordshire, formed in 1999.

== History ==
=== Early days (1999–2002) ===
Sikth formed in late 1999, but consolidated their line-up in March 2001. That line-up consisted of dual vocalists Mikee Goodman and Justin Hill, guitarists Dan Weller and Graham Pinney, bassist James Leach and drummer/percussionist Dan Foord.

Their first official release was an EP titled Let the Transmitting Begin. Released in 2002, it featured three tracks, as well as a limited edition live CD from the BBC Radio 1 recordings of the same songs.

The band's first release for Gut Records was an EP titled How May I Help You? Released in 2002, it featured three tracks, two of which were on the band's debut album. A video for the song "(If You Weren't So) Perfect" was also contained. The song "How May I Help You?" contained a story about a person called Rodney. The song was made into an animated video, which was written, directed and produced by Mikee Goodman. It went on to win the best video award in The Big Cheese Magazine, as well as reaching number 1 on MTV UK, and being an A-list video on MTV Asia.

=== Debut album (2003–2005) ===
Sikth's debut album The Trees Are Dead & Dried Out Wait for Something Wild was released on 18 August 2003 through Gut Records. The album was produced by the band themselves, along with Andrew Scarth. Mixing duties were handled by Colin Richardson. Two singles were released from the album in "Scent of the Obscene" (October) and "Peep Show" (December). The album has sold approximately 30,000 copies in the UK, Japan and Australia.

In support of the album, Sikth performed at Download Festival at Donington Park in 2003. The band subsequently travelled to Japan in 2004, firstly supporting Anthrax and Killswitch Engage, then playing at the Fuji Rock Festival in August with Lou Reed, PJ Harvey and Primus. Also in 2004, the band made an appearance at the debut Fuse Leeds festival of cross-disciplinary New Music, at the personal invitation of festival curator Django Bates (they played a support slot to Bates' own jazz ensemble on the closing night of the festival).

=== Second album (2006–2007) ===
The band returned in 2006 with their second full-length album Death of a Dead Day. It was released in the UK on 26 June 2006 on their new label Bieler Bros. Records. It was earlier released in the US on 6 June. The album entered the UK album charts at number 94. The album was once again produced by the band themselves, with mixing duties handled by Matt Plant.

In support of the album, Sikth performed a show at The White Horse in High Wycombe, the venue of their first ever gig, on 6 June 2006 and at the Download Festival 2006 four days later, as well as short UK tour.

An EP titled Flogging the Horses was released in October 2006, featuring demo versions from Death of a Dead Day tracks, as well as a remix version of "Where Do We Fall?". The track "Each Other and Ourselves" was also included, which was a bonus track on the Japanese version of the album. The EP was limited to just 1,500 copies.

=== Departure of vocalists and hiatus (2007–2013) ===
On 8 May 2007, it was announced that vocalists Mikee Goodman and Justin Hill would be leaving the band at the conclusion of the July 2007 "The Black Summer Starts Here" UK tour set, due to their ongoing projects and producing careers. Goodman's and Hill's final performance in Sikth was at the Carling Academy, Islington, London on 14 September 2007 (this was a rescheduled show).

On 27 May 2008, Sikth announced that the band had decided to split due to numerous factors. The main reasons cited for their break-up was the inability to find a replacement for Mikee and Justin, as well as commitment to other projects.

On 15 January 2012, an official Sikth Facebook Page was created by the band in order to reissue and sell Sikth merchandise. The band also stated that when they do reform, it will not be "for the wrong reasons" and that "we owe it to our fans to produce something very special when we return."

=== Reunion and third album (2014–2022) ===
On 16 December 2013 it was revealed in a surprise announcement that Sikth were to be playing a reunion set at Download Festival 2014, headlining the Red Bull stage. This was the band's first live performance since 2007 and their first appearance at Download Festival since 2006. On 25 March, they were also announced to be headlining October's Euroblast festival in Cologne, Germany. On 13 June 2014, Sikth announced a full autumn UK tour via their Facebook page running through October and November. Sikth also played at UK Tech-Metal Festival as the main headliner on 14 June 2014. This was followed by a couple of dates in Asia, headlining Silence Festival V in Nepal 17–18 October 2014 - sharing the same stage where Enigmatik, Vader, Textures and Behemoth had headlined before. And headlining BIG69 metal festival in Mumbai, India, 17 - 18 January 2015, alongside Carcass, Fleshgod Apocalypse, and Hacktivist.

On 27 April 2015 Sikth announced via their Facebook page that they are planning to release new music in the form of a crowd funded EP with a tour to follow. Fans who pre-ordered the EP were able to visit the pledgemusic page and gain access to exclusive updates, content and merchandise for the duration of the funding campaign. The six track EP, titled Opacities, was released on 4 December 2015. Sikth were also the opening act for Slipknot on their 2016 U.K tour in February alongside Suicidal Tendencies. They were announced to be performing the Arctangent Festival in August 2016, but later pulled out. They appeared in 2017.

On 3 June 2016 Justin Hill announced his retirement in order to focus on his production career. Joe Rosser from Pin's second band Aliases was announced as his replacement.

The band embarked on the "Riddles of Humanity" tour with Loathe as their support act in September 2018. Graham Pinney was absent from that years shows as he was taking a temporary hiatus from the band. Their final show of the year was at Festivile on 20 October 2018; it was also at this show where frontman Mikee Goodman said that "This will be the last show we'll do for a while". He also stated he is unsure if they will return soon and if new music will be made.

=== Original lineup reunion and upcoming fourth album (2022–present) ===
After no activity during the COVID pandemic, in July 2021, Joe Rosser departed the band to retire from music temporarily in order to pursue a career in logistics. He would later return to music in 2024 with a reunited Mask of Virtue and in 2025 with his cover band PABLO!.

In March 2022, the band announced that Justin Hill and Graham Pinney would rejoin the band permanently for a set of anniversary shows in November 2022. At the Manchester date of the show the band brought out Joe Rosser for the songs "Sanguine Seas of Bigotry" and "Bland Street Bloom" as a thank you to his tenure in the band when Justin departed.

In June 2025 the band announced two headline appearances in Manchester and London playing "Death of a Dead Day" in its entirety in February 2026, Adam "Nolly" Getgood filled in for James Leach at these shows due to scheduling conflicts. At the Manchester date of this tour Mikee confirmed a fourth Sikth album was being written.

The band would later appear at RADAR Festival in Manchester in July and are scheduled to appear at ArcTangenT festival in August 2026.

== Musical style ==
Sikth are commonly categorised as progressive metal due to their unorthodox approach, as well as avant-garde metal and mathcore due to the complex nature of their instrumental playing abilities and the regular inclusion of dissonance into their music.

According to guitarist Dan Weller;

"Energy has always inspired us, things that really get you pumping. We play extreme music, sure, but in the sense that we go to all extremes. If something sounds good, then we'll do it, and that includes beautiful, melodic music, which we all love, too".

According to guitarist Pin;

"But we're always concerned with the quality of the tune; just writing crazy music isn't enough, and I think that's what makes us different from other bands who go really technical. We're definitely writing songs."

In a review for Sikth's second album Death of a Dead Day, DecoyMusic.com described the band's style as containing elements of "speed metal, progressive metal, thrash, nu metal, metalcore, and cock-rock". The website Drowned in Sound "sees the band come across like a heady America-friendly mix of Dillinger Escape Plan's feather-fingered guitar contorting melded with Korn's manipulated rhythms, thundering through the bizarre nuances of System of a Down".

In a review for the band's debut album The Trees Are Dead & Dried Out Wait for Something Wild, MusicOMH.com described the album as containing "guttural throaty vocals mixed with harmonized melodies, viciously rhythmic drumming which instantly metamorphosises into elaborate percussion, and haunting atmospheric piano interludes which sit superbly between slices of metal brutality". In the early days of the band, Goodman once described their sound as "scatcore", a reference to their fast-jabbering scat style of singing.

Journalist Ben Welch credited them as "progenitors" of djent.

== Members ==
=== Current members ===
- Mikee Goodman – vocals (1999–2007, 2013–present)
- Dan Weller – guitar, piano (1999–2008, 2013–present)
- Graham "Pin" Pinney – guitar (1999–2008, 2013–2018, 2022–present)
- Dan "Loord" Foord – drums, percussion (2001–2008, 2013–present)
- James Leach – bass (2001–2008, 2013–present)
- Justin Hill – vocals (2001–2007, 2013–2016, 2022–present)

=== Former members ===
- Tristan Lucey - vocals (1999–2000)
- Jamie Hunter - bass (1999–2000)
- [unknown name] - unknown (1999–2001)
- Joe Rosser – vocals (2016–2021)

=== Members and other projects ===
- Mikee Goodman – vocals

Alongside producing and vocal coaching, Goodman is a member of Primal Rock Rebellion, featuring Iron Maiden guitarist Adrian Smith and Sikth drummer Dan Foord. Mikee's first project after Sikth was The Painted Smiles and appeared on the tracks 'Dark Matter' by This Is Menace and 'Sleep Street' by Cyclamen. He also sings/screams on Deathembers EP ''A Thousand Flatlines'' track 4 ''The Linear Act''. His latest musical project is the band Outpatients (later renamed Outside the Coma), a "male and female dual vocal, experimental, electronic/rock/metal band".

- Dan Weller – guitar, piano

Weller is currently the guitarist of In Colour, which features TesseracT vocalist Daniel Tompkins. Weller produced Enter Shikari's 3rd album, A Flash Flood of Colour, and assisted in the production of their 2nd album Common Dreads. He has also produced two albums by the band Young Guns. Dan wrote the music alongside co-writer, Ciaran Cahill (who plays keyboards alongside him in In Colour) for Transmission Impossible with Ed & Oucho on the BBC.

- James Leach – bass

James teaches bass and is Gallows' drum tech. He is a member of supergroups Krokodil and Gold Key, and allegedly part of the hardcore punk group The Hell. James also played bass for Pure Love's live shows on their 2014 farewell tour. Devin Townsend confirmed on Twitch that James is playing bass on his upcoming production Lightwork. James is also rumoured to be the bassist in anonymous band President.

- Dan "Loord" Foord – drums, percussion

Loord has performed session work for the bands Primal Rock Rebellion, Sol Invicto and The HAARP Machine. He is currently working as a music tutor at West Herts College.

- Justin Hill – vocals

Justin featured on the track Predisposed from the 2006 album No End in Sight, then returned the favour on Return The Favour from the 2007 album The Scene Is Dead by This Is Menace, Dreams Without Courage from the 2007 album Entities by Malefice and Distance from the 2013 album Severance by Heart of a Coward. Justin also works as a producer.

- Graham "Pin" Pinney – guitar

Pin is currently a member of the progressive metal band Aliases, who are signed to Basick Records. They have released one EP, Safer Than Reality, and are currently working on a full-length album. He also is a guitar teacher.

- Joe Rosser – vocals

Rosser was announced as the replacement for Justin Hill following Hills departure in order to focus on production. Joe Rosser is also a member of guitarist Pins other band, Aliases. Rosser debuted on the Aliases single 'Exasperated', subsequently appearing on Aliases second release Derangeable. Rosser debuted as co-vocalist alongside Mikee Goodman on Sikth's 2017 record The Future In Whose Eyes?

Not much is known about the band's lineup before 2001, except the band's other vocalist besides Goodman was Tristan Lucey instead of Hill, and there were two other members, one of them named Jamie Hunter.

== Discography ==
=== Studio albums ===
Year	Album details	Peak chart positions						Certification
Year	Album details	UK	UK Rock	UK Indie	US Heat	US Indie	SCO	Certification
2003	The Trees Are Dead & Dried Out Wait for Something Wild: Released: 18 August 2003; Label: Unparalleled Carousel/Gut; Formats: CD, digital download	106	8	13	−	−	−	
2006	Death of a Dead Day: Released: 6 June 2006; Label: Bieler Bros.; Formats: CD, digital download	94	7	–	−	−	−	
2017	The Future in Whose Eyes?: Released: 2 June 2017; Label: Millennium Night; Formats: CD, digital download	100	3	9	20	50	88	

=== EPs ===
Year	Album details	Peak chart positions
Year	Album details	US Heat
2002	Let the Transmitting Begin: Released: 2002; Label: Infernal; Formats: CD	—
2002	How May I Help You?: Released: 23 September 2002; Label: Unparalleled Carousel; Formats: CD	—
2006	Flogging the Horses: Released: 2 October 2006; Label: Bieler Bros.; Formats: CD	—
2015	Opacities: Released: 4 December 2015; Label: Independent; Formats: CD, digital download	21

=== Singles ===
Year	Title	Peak chart positions			Album
Year	Title	UK	UK Rock	UK Indie	Album
2003	"Scent of the Obscene"	101	12	28	The Trees Are Dead & Dried Out Wait for Something Wild
2003	"Pussyfoot"	—	—	—	The Trees Are Dead & Dried Out Wait for Something Wild
2004	"Peep Show"	—	—	—	The Trees Are Dead & Dried Out Wait for Something Wild
2015	"Philistine Philosophies"	—	—	—	Opacities
2017	"No Wishbones"	—	—	—	The Future in Whose Eyes?
2017	"Vivid"	—	—	—	The Future in Whose Eyes?
2017	"Golden Cufflinks"	—	—	—	The Future in Whose Eyes?

=== Music videos ===
Year	Song	Director
2002	"(If You Weren't So) Perfect"	Greg Brimson
2002	"How May I Help You?"	
2003	"Scent of the Obscene"	
2004	"Peep Show"	
2006	"Scent of the Obscene" (alternate version)	Patrick Ryan
2006	"Bland Street Bloom"	Tim Fox
2015	"Philistine Philosophies"	Mikee Goodman
2017	"Golden Cufflinks"	Mikee Goodman
2017	"Cracks Of Light"	Mikee Goodman

=== Demos and promos ===
- Pussyfoot/Suffice (2000)
- Hold My Finger/Such the Fool (2001)
- Pussyfoot (2003)

== Tours and festivals ==
- 2000 – UK Tour with Sanctum.
- 2001 – UK Tour with Dead Life Portrait.
- 2002 – UK Tour supporting American Head Charge.
- 2003 – UK Tour supporting Mad Capsule Markets.
- 2003 – UK Tour supporting Mudvayne.
- 2003 – Download Festival 2003 at Donington Park, 3rd stage.
- 2003 – Europe Tour supporting Machine Head.
- 2004 – UK Headline Tour With Akercocke and Hondo Maclean
- 2004 – Ireland tour with Akercocke and Labrat.
- 2004 – Japanese tour supporting Anthrax & Killswitch Engage.
- 2004 – Fuji Rock Festival in Japan.
- 2004 – UK tour supporting Pitchshifter.
- 2006 – Fury Fest in France.
- 2006 – French headline tour.
- 2006 – Barfly/Jägermeister UK tour in March/April.
- 2006 – Album release show on 6 June, High Wycombe.
- 2006 – Download Festival 2006, 2nd stage.
- 2006 – Death of a Dead Day UK Headline tour supported by Dead Man in Reno & Architects.
- 2007 – Death of a Week Day UK tour in July.
- 2007 – Final show before split at the Islington Carling Academy in London on Friday 14 September.
- 2014 – Headlined the Red Bull Stage at Download Festival on Saturday 14 June.
- 2014 – Silence Festival in Nepal on 18 October.
- 2015 – BIG69 Festival in Mumbai, India, 18 January
- 2015 – Breakout Festival Brighton, 26 September
- 2016 – UK tour supporting Slipknot and Suicidal Tendencies
- 2016–2000 Trees festival
- 2016 – USA Tour supporting Periphery
- 2017 – European & UK tour supporting Trivium and SHVPES
- 2017 – Download Festival 2017, Main Stage.
- 2017 – ArcTanGent Festival
- 2018 – UK TechFest
- 2018 – UK Tour with Loathe
- 2018 – UK Festivile 2018
- 2019 – PULP Summer Slam 2019 in Quezon City, Philippines
