= Dan Weller =

English guitarist, songwriter, and record producer

- Born: 3 April 1980 (age 46); Liverpool, England
- Genres: Progressive metal; mathcore; avant-garde metal; djent
- Occupations: Guitarist, producer, writer
- Years active: 1999–present
- Member of: Sikth

Dan Weller (born 3 April 1980) is an English record producer, audio mixer, songwriter and guitarist, known for his work in rock and metal. He was born in Liverpool and moved to Hertfordshire at age of six. At 15 he began playing guitar and formed a band with school friends. That band later became SikTh.

== SikTh ==
In 1999/2000 Weller and school friend Graham Pinney formed SikTh. They recruited singers Mikee W Goodman and Justin Hill, bassist James Leach and drummer Dan 'Loord' Foord. SikTh went on to become one of the UK's most influential Heavy Metal bands releasing 3 EP's and 2 Albums internationally. In 2011 The Guardian wrote that along with Swedish band Meshuggah, SikTh were the founders of the international Metal phenomenon Djent. SikTh became very popular across the world and particularly in the UK, US and Japan. SikTh split up in 2008 but reformed in 2014, when they toured Germany, Japan, Nepal, and Britain and appeared at the BIG69 festival in Mumbai, India in 2015. The band also appeared in the Indian version of Rolling Stone magazine.

== Producing ==
Having worked with producer Colin Richardson on the first SikTh album, Weller became fascinated by music production. Three years later in Miami he handled production duties on the band's follow-up album Death of a Dead Day. Thus ensued a production career.

Weller is well known as a long term collaborator with UK sonic pioneers Enter Shikari. He produced A Flash Flood of Colour, the third Enter Shikari album at Karma Sound Studios in Thailand, as well as featuring in the band's Phenakistoscope documentary. Weller had previously worked on the band's second album, Common Dreads and also produced follow-up singles "Destabilise" and "Quelle Surprise". He then went on to produce the three singles-EP Rat Race and the fourth album of the band, The Mindsweep.

He produced the debut Young Guns album and the followup, Bones the lead single from which (Bones) achieved active number 1 in America along with being the official theme for WWE Wrestlemania.

In 2021, Weller produced the award winning Elles Bailey album, Shining In The Half Light. It was recorded in Devon in the midst of a COVID-19 lockdown

== Writing ==
As of January 2016, Weller has been published by Bucks Music Group. He has co-written with countless artists and has a reputation for nurturing/developing talent.

The Vienna-based synth-pop band Hunger was developed by Weller in a co-writing / production capacity. The band's first single, "Amused", was featured on the Netflix show 13 Reasons Why as well as being used on a Mitsubishi television commercial. Notably, Taylor Swift picked the song out for her "Taylor Likes" Spotify playlist.
