= The Mindsweep =

Studio album by Enter Shikari
- Released: 14 January 2015
- Recorded: 2014
- Studios: Chapel Studios (Lincolnshire, England)
- Genres: Post-hardcore; alternative rock; electronic rock
- Length: 44:42
- Labels: Ambush Reality, PIAS Recordings, Hopeless Records
- Producers: Enter Shikari, Dan Weller

Enter Shikari chronology
A Flash Flood of Colour (2012)	The Mindsweep (2015)	The Mindsweep: Hospitalised (2015)

Singles from The Mindsweep
- 1. "The Last Garrison" Released: 20 October 2014; 2. "Anaesthetist" Released: 5 January 2015

The Mindsweep is the fourth studio album by the English rock band Enter Shikari, released on 19 January 2015 through Ambush Reality, PIAS Recordings and Hopeless Records. It was recorded in 2014 with producer Dan Weller.

== Background ==
On 26 June 2014, the band performed their new song "Anaesthetist" for the first time and uploaded a video on their YouTube Channel of them doing a practice run. Then they played it all of the dates that they played on Vans Warped Tour.

== Production, lyrical themes ==
When writing lyrics for the album, frontman Rou Reynolds researched the topics he addressed, such as climate change and the 2008 financial crisis, to make sure he was making accurate statements.

Reynolds said the album was as diverse as A Flash Flood of Colour in the sense that every track is different, "cover[ing] all corners of the musical spectrum." When choosing "which of the tracks they've been working on should make it on to [the album]", Enter Shikari found it hard to decide. Therefore, they made a graph where "the vertical axis charted the heaviness of the songs [while] the horizontal one [charted] their location on a scale ranging from 'accessible' to 'experimental'", and "where clusters indicated several songs covering the same territory, only one was allowed to make the cut", so that the album would feature something "from everywhere within [the band's] spectrum of sounds."

Reynolds said "The Last Garrison" is a "celebration of the fact that we're alive, and the magnitude of luck it took for you to even exist at all." Reynolds said "Torn Apart" talks about the "uselessness of the concept of 'race' when it comes to genetics". He added that the song's riff was one of the band's oldest riffs, dating from the period that they wrote "Sorry You're Not a Winner" but "only felt right to develop it now".

The song "Anaesthetist" is about the privatisation of the National Health Service. On the song, frontman Rou Reynolds stated "We seem to have reached a stage of such capitalistic fervour, that we believe it acceptable to punish people for ill health. By charging for healthcare we act as if illness is nothing but one's own problem, but what is the purpose and advantage of 'civilisation' if it is not helping the most vulnerable within society? The lottery of birth can offer us a wealth of bad luck when it comes to our health and the safety nets are being pulled in as the desire to boost profit overtakes the desire to help people."

== Release ==
The album was announced on 8 October 2014, along with a European and UK tour in support. On 20 October, "The Last Garrison" was played on Zane Lowe's Hottest Record on BBC Radio 1 and was the first single off of the album. The song's official music video was uploaded to Hopeless Records' YouTube channel on 11 November. The video was filmed in a studio on what Reynolds called an "anti-stage": "basically a sunken stage below the level of the rest of the room." He mentioned that all of the chorus parts were done with a "sunset sort of vibe". He added that the lightning used cause the band to be hot, "and then we did the 'dry' storm stuff, so we were being bombarded by bits of polystyrene."

Enter Shikari streamed the song "Never Let Go of the Microscope" on their YouTube channel on 26 November, and several weeks later they released the video for "Slipshod", an iTunes-only bonus track, on 15 December through the same channels. The video is a satirical cartoonised skit featuring the members of the band dining at a restaurant and being dissatisfied with their food, as per the lyrics of the song.

On 19 December, Enter Shikari announced a headlining North American tour in support of The Mindsweep with Stray from the Path, I the Mighty, Hundredth (3/23-3/31) and A Lot Like Birds (4/01-4/28). To celebrate the release of the album, the band opened a pop up shop in Camden. On 5 January 2015, "Anaesthetist" was released as the second single taken from the album, accompanied with a music video. On 12 January, the full album was streamed online several days before its intended release date. Later on throughout the album's release cycle, "Torn Apart" was released as a promotional single on 8 June 2015. The song later received its own music video.

== Critical reception ==
Professional ratings
Aggregate scores
Source	Rating
Metacritic	89/100
Review scores
Source	Rating
Alternative Press	5/5 stars
Kerrang!	5/5 stars
NME	7/10 stars
Q	4/5 stars

The album received acclaim from music critics: on Metacritic, a review aggregator site, the album received a score of 89/100 (indicating "universal acclaim") based on 6 reviews. The album received maximum ratings from Alternative Press and Kerrang! The latter called The Mindsweep the band's "most diverse album to date", contrasting the "punk thrash" of "There's a Price on Your Head" with "Dear Future Historians...", which they described as a "Radiohead-esque piano ballad". They also compared the style of "Anaesthetist" to that of the Prodigy. The album was included at number 4 on Rock Sound's top 50 releases of 2015 list.

== Track listing ==
All lyrics are written by Roughton "Rou" Reynolds; all music is composed by Enter Shikari.

No.	Title	Length
1.	"The Appeal & the Mindsweep I"	4:50
2.	"The One True Colour"	3:53
3.	"Anaesthetist"	2:55
4.	"The Last Garrison"	3:42
5.	"Never Let Go of the Microscope"	4:02
6.	"Myopia"	4:10
7.	"Torn Apart"	3:54
8.	"Interlude"	0:56
9.	"The Bank of England"	3:23
10.	"There's a Price on Your Head"	2:49
11.	"Dear Future Historians..."	6:28
12.	"The Appeal & the Mindsweep II"	3:40

iTunes bonus track
No.	Title	Length
13.	"Slipshod"	2:12

Japanese edition bonus tracks
No.	Title	Length
13.	"Slipshod"	2:12
14.	"The Paddington Frisk"	1:16
15.	"Rat Race"	3:17
16.	"Radiate"	4:32

"Deluxe CD+DVD Edition" bonus DVD "Live at A2 St. Petersburg, Russia – Bootleg Series Volume 6"
No.	Title	Length
1.	"Enter Shikari"
2.	"The Paddington Frisk"
3.	"Sssnakepit"
4.	"Destabilise"
5.	"Radiate"
6.	"Gandhi Mate, Gandhi"
7.	"Sorry You're Not a Winner"
8.	"Arguing with Thermometers"
9.	"Juggernauts"
10.	"Constellations" "Live at Reading Festival, UK 2014""
11.	"Solidarity"
12.	"Zzzonked"
13.	"2014 Intro"
14.	"Solidarity"
15.	"The Paddington Frisk"
16.	"Destabilise"
17.	"Radiate"
18.	"Sorry You're Not a Winner"
19.	"Gandhi Mate, Gandhi"
20.	"Anaesthetist"
21.	"Arguing with Thermometers"
22.	"Sssnakepit"

"Deluxe LP+CD+DVD Edition" bonus DVD "Live at Woodstock, Poland 2013"
No.	Title	Length
1.	"System..."
2.	"...Meltdown"
3.	"Sorry, You're Not a Winner"
4.	"Destabilise"
5.	"Radiate"
6.	"Sssnakepit"
7.	"Gandhi Mate, Gandhi"
8.	"Juggernauts"
9.	"Constellations"
10.	"Quelle Surprise"
11.	"The Paddington Frisk"
12.	"Motherstep 2.0/Mothership"
13.	"Zzzonked" "Live at Download Festival, UK 2013""
14.	"System..."
15.	"...Meltdown"
16.	"Sorry, You're Not a Winner"
17.	"Destabilise"
18.	"Radiate"
19.	"Sssnakepit"
20.	"Juggernauts"
21.	"Gandhi Mate, Gandhi"
22.	"The Paddington Frisk"
23.	"Motherstep 2.0/Mothership"
24.	"Arguing with Thermometers"
25.	"Zzzonked"

== Personnel ==
Enter Shikari

- Roughton "Rou" Reynolds – vocals, keys, piano, electronics, trumpet, orchestral arrangements, lyrics, guitars
- Liam "Rory" Clewlow – guitars, vocals
- Chris Batten – bass, co-vocals, keys
- Rob Rolfe – drums, percussion, vocals

Additional musicians

- Paul Sartin – violin on "The One True Colour", "Torn Apart", "There's a Price on Your Head", "Dear Future Historians..." and "The Appeal & the Mindsweep II"; oboe on "Dear Future Historians..."
- Beth Porter – cello on "The One True Colour", "Torn Apart", "There's a Price on Your Head", "Dear Future Historians..." and "The Appeal & the Mindsweep II"
- Jackie Oates – violin on "The One True Colour", "Torn Apart", "There's a Price on Your Head", "Dear Future Historians..." and "The Appeal & the Mindsweep II"
- Alex Harman, Ashley King (of St Albans), Bill Ransom, Chris Graham, Daniel Griffin, Fran Padormo, Ian Drayner, Jamie Littler, Louis Springfield, Nathan Killham, Nick 'Balls' Uperton, Sam Baker, Sam Newham, Simon Hofmeister, Vivien Vincze, William Tallis – gang vocals
- Alban Reynolds – trombone on "Torn Apart", "Interlude", "Dear Future Historians..." and "The Appeal & the Mindsweep II"

Production

- Dan Weller and Enter Shikari – production
- Tim Morris – studio engineer, additional production on "The Last Garrison"
- Jeremy Wheatley (for 365 Artists) – mixing
- Stuart Hawkes (at Metropolis Group, London) – mastering
- Pip Newby – A&R
- Luke Insect Studio – art direction

== Charts ==
Chart performance for The Mindsweep
Chart (2015)	Peak position
Australian Albums (ARIA)	19
Belgian Albums (Ultratop Flanders)	68
Belgian Albums (Ultratop Wallonia)	125
Dutch Albums (Album Top 100)	26
Japanese Albums (Oricon)	142
Swiss Albums (Schweizer Hitparade)	66
UK Albums (Official Charts)	6
UK Independent Albums (Official Charts)	1
UK Rock & Metal Albums (Official Charts)	2
US Billboard 200	166
US Independent Albums (Billboard)	12
US Top Rock Albums (Billboard)	16
US Top Hard Rock Albums (Billboard)	5

== Certifications ==
Certifications for The Mindsweep
Region	Certification	Certified units/sales
United Kingdom (BPI)	Silver	60,000^{‡}
^{‡} Sales+streaming figures based on certification alone.
