= A Flash Flood of Colour World Tour =

2012–13 concert tour by Enter Shikari

- Tour by Enter Shikari
- 27 September 2011, show at the Rockhal, Esch-sur-Alzette, Luxembourg
- Location: North America; Europe; Oceania; Asia; Africa
- Associated album: A Flash Flood of Colour
- Start date: 16 January 2012
- End date: 27 January 2013
- Legs: 11
- No. of shows: 66 in North America; 72 in Europe; 12 in Oceania; 2 in Africa; 1 in Asia; 153 in total

A Flash Flood of Colour World Tour was a concert tour by rock band Enter Shikari, which took place through 2012 and 2013, in support of the band's third studio album A Flash Flood of Colour, released on 16 January 2012. The tour supersedes the world tour that the band embarked on to support Common Dreads throughout 2009 and 2010. A Flash Flood of Colour was recorded in Bangkok, Thailand, between 8 May and 4 June 2011.

== About ==
The band began the tour with two intimate warm-up shows in London and Amsterdam, on 15 & 17 June, respectively. The official first leg began as part of the Warped Tour 2011 with the band playing on the Advent stage throughout the whole tour, with the European leg beginning on 26 August 2011, as the band plays the main stage as the Leeds and Reading festivals and then heading out on a tour of mainland Europe throughout September and October with support from Your Demise and letlive. These shows were the first to feature tracks from A Flash Flood of Colour live, which were Sssnakepit and Arguing With Thermometers.

On 3 November 2011, the band set out to North America and Canada to support The Devil Wears Prada, along with Whitechapel and For Today.

The band played 3 intimate shows in the UK to celebrate the release of A Flash Flood of Colour. The first show on the actual release date, 16 January 2012, was at The Borderline in London. The event was sponsored by HMV, and you had to pre-order the new album via their webstore or the Enter Shikari webstore to be entered into a draw to win tickets to attend. Support came from Sam Duckworth (Get Cape. Wear Cape. Fly). The next show the following day was at The Hippodrome in Kingston, where if you pre-ordered the new album via independent record store Banquet Records, you could attend the show, which sold out extremely quickly. The final show was at The Cockpit in Leeds, where the band again showed their support for independent record stores and solely allowed entrance to those who pre-ordered the new album from Jumbo Records and Crash Records, whom sold out of their allocation within an hour of going on sale. These shows were the first times the tracks, "System...", "...Meltdown," "Stalemate," "Gandhi Mate, Gandhi," "Search Party," and "Hello Tyrannosaurus, Meet Tyrannocide" were ever played live. Support for these two shows came from Fine Young Firecrackers. The following two days featured signings at HMV in Leicester and St. Albans.

On 12 February 2012, the band played a very lowkey and insanely fast selling show at The Bull and Gate, a small pub in Kentish Town for the purpose to be filmed exclusively for Scuzz. The show aired on 31 March 2012 at 5pm. The show was filmed and edited by Stand Your Ground Media.

On 23 February 2012, the band set out to Australia for Soundwave and a series of sideshows via Tokyo, Japan for one sold-out show. The band headlined Stage 6A at Soundwave. Support for the sideshows came from letlive. and Your Demise.

On arrival back from Australia, the band and crew tackled jet-lag to instantly begin work on pre-production for the European and UK headline run, starting on 10 March 2012 in Amsterdam, Netherlands, lasting two weeks finishing in a sold out Hammersmith Apollo show in London on 23 March 2012, which was the only show to feature a cameo appearance from "Phillis McCleavland", Rou's character in the video for "Arguing with Thermometers". The production for this tour was the most elaborate to date, which featured a huge lighting rig built around 5 large triangles, as well as lasers, bubble machines and confetti machines. Support came from Young Guns, The James Cleaver Quintet (Europe only), and Tek-One (UK only).

On 1 April 2012, the band embarked on their first American headline tour since October 2010, running through to mid May. Support for the tour came from letlive. and At the Skylines. The band wanted to break the traditional 5 or 6 band bill that seems dominant in America right now, and rather allow their supports a decent time slot and changeover time.

Following the American stint, the bands summer focus was solely European festivals, including festivals such as Radio 1's Big Weekend, Reading and Leeds Festivals, Pukkelpop, FM4 Frequency Festival, Sonisphere in Spain, T in the Park, Rock am Ring and Rock im Park, and many more, ranging from the end of May to the end of August.

== Set list ==
Warm-up dates
- "System..."
- "...Meltdown"
- "Gandhi Mate, Gandhi"
- "Sorry, You're Not a Winner" (Extended Outro)
- "Destabilise"
- "Mothership" (Motherstep Intro)
- "Search Party"
- "Stalemate"
- "Quelle Surprise" (Rout VIP Mix Outro)
- "Juggernauts" (Blue Bear's True Tiger Remix)
- "Arguing with Thermometers"
- "Fanfare for the Conscious Man"

Encore

- "Hello Tyrannosaurus, Meet Tyrannicide"
- "Sssnakepit" (Hamilton Remix Intro)
Asia
- "System..."
- "...Meltdown"
- "Gandhi Mate, Gandhi"
- "Sorry, You're Not a Winner" (Extended Outro)
- "Destabilise"
- "Mothership" (Motherstep Intro)
- "Search Party"
- "Stalemate"
- "Quelle Surprise" (Rout VIP Mix Outro)
- "Juggernauts" (Blue Bear's True Tiger Remix)
- "Arguing with Thermometers"
- "Fanfare for the Conscious Man"

Encore

- "Hello Tyrannosaurus, Meet Tyrannicide"
- "Sssnakepit" (Hamilton Remix Intro)
Oceania, Leg No. 1
- "System..."
- "...Meltdown"
- "Gandhi Mate, Gandhi"
- "Sorry, You're Not a Winner"
- "Destabilise"
- "Mothership" (Motherstep Intro)
- "Search Party"
- "Stalemate"
- "Quelle Surprise" (Rout VIP Mix Outro)
- "Juggernauts" (Blue Bear's True Tiger Remix)
- "Arguing with Thermometers"

Encore

- "Hello Tyrannosaurus, Meet Tyrannicide"
- "Sssnakepit" (Hamilton Remix Intro)
Oceania, Leg No. 1 (Soundwave set)
- "System..."
- "...Meltdown"
- "Destabilise"
- "Mothership"
- "Arguing with Thermometers"
- "Sorry, You're Not a Winner"
- "Gandhi Mate, Gandhi"
- "Juggernauts" (Blue Bear's True Tiger Remix)
- "Sssnakepit"
Europe, Leg No. 1
- "System..."
- "...Meltdown"
- "Gandhi Mate, Gandhi"
- "The Feast"
- "The Jester" (No Intro; Extended Outro)
- "Quelle Surprise" (Rout VIP Mix Outro)
- "Hello Tyrannosaurus, Meet Tyrannicide"
- "Havoc B"
- "Search Party"
- "Destabilise"
- "Mothership" (Motherstep Intro)
- "Stalemate"
- "Juggernauts" (Blue Bear's True Tiger Remix)
- "Arguing with Thermometers"
- "Enter Shikari" (Reworked Intro)

Encore

- "Return to Energiser"
- "Sssnakepit" (Hamilton Remix Intro)
North America, Leg No. 1
- "System..."
- "...Meltdown"
- "Gandhi Mate, Gandhi"
- "The Feast"
- "The Jester" (No Intro; Extended Outro)
- "Sorry, You're Not a Winner"
- "Hello Tyrannosaurus, Meet Tyrannicide"
- "Havoc B"
- "Destabilise"
- "Mothership" (Motherstep Intro)
- "Search Party"
- "Stalemate" (Not played on every date)
- "Juggernauts" (Blue Bear's True Tiger Remix)
- "Arguing with Thermometers"
- "Enter Shikari" (Reworked Intro)

Encore

- "Return to Energiser"
- "Sssnakepit" (Hamilton Remix Intro)
Europe, Leg No. 2
- "System..."
- "...Meltdown"
- "Sorry, You're Not a Winner"
- "Hello Tyrannosaurus, Meet Tyrannicide"
- "Destabilise"
- "Mothership" (Motherstep Intro)
- "Warm Smiles Do Not Make You Welcome Here" / "Stalemate" (Varied between shows)
- "Gandhi Mate, Gandhi"
- "No Sssweat"
- "Juggernauts" (Blue Bear's True Tiger Remix)
- "Arguing with Thermometers"
- "Enter Shikari" (Not played on every date)
- "Sssnakepit"
- "Zzzonked"
Europe, Leg No. 3
- "System..."
- "...Meltdown"
- "Sorry, You're Not a Winner" (Extended Outro)
- "The Jester"
- "Destabilise"
- "Mothership" (Motherstep Intro)
- "Quelle Surprise" (Not played on every date)
- "Warm Smiles Do Not Make You Welcome Here"
- "Gandhi Mate, Gandhi"
- "Juggernauts" (Blue Bear's True Tiger Remix)
- "Arguing with Thermometers"
- "Sssnakepit"
- "Zzzonked"
North America, Leg No. 2 (Supporting Falling in Reverse)
- "System..."
- "...Meltdown"
- "Destabilise"
- "Mothership" (Motherstep 2.0 Intro)
- "Gandhi Mate, Gandhi"
- "Sorry You're Not a Winner" (Extended Outro)
- "Arguing With Thermometers"
- "Zzzonked"
Europe, Leg No. 5
- "System..."
- "...Meltdown"
- "Step Up" (Extended Outro)
- "Antwerpen" (Extended Outro)
- "Sssnakepit" (Hamilton Remix Intro)
- "Gandhi Mate, Gandhi"
- "Labyrinth" (Including Sssnakepit beer intermission)
- "Destabilise"
- "Return To Energiser" (Reworked bridge)
- "Warm Smiles Do Not Make You Welcome Here"
- "Gap in the Fence"
- "Juggernauts"
- "Arguing With Thermometers"
- "Mothership" (Motherstep 2.0 Intro)

Encore

- "Constellations"
- "Pack of Thieves"
- "Zzzonked"

== Tour dates ==
Date	City	Country	Venue
Warm-up dates
16 January 2012	London	England	The Borderline
17 January 2012	Kingston upon Thames	England	The Hippodrome
18 January 2012	Leeds	England	The Cockpit
12 February 2012	London	England	The Bull and Gate
Asia, Leg #1
23 February 2012	Tokyo	Japan	Ebisu Liquid Room
Oceania, Leg #1; Support acts: letlive. and Your Demise
25 February 2012	Brisbane	Australia	Soundwave Festival
26 February 2012	Sydney	Australia	Soundwave Festival
28 February 2012	Melbourne	Australia	Billboard The Venue
29 February 2012	Sydney	Australia	The Metro Theatre
2 March 2012	Melbourne	Australia	Soundwave Festival
3 March 2012	Adelaide	Australia	Soundwave Festival
5 March 2012	Perth	Australia	Soundwave Festival
=Europe, Leg #1; Support acts: Young Guns, The James Cleaver Quintet (EU Only) and Tek-One (UK Only)
10 March 2012	Amsterdam	Netherlands	Melkweg
12 March 2012	Hamburg	Germany	Markthalle
13 March 2012	Cologne	Germany	Live Music Hall
14 March 2012	Frankfurt	Germany	Sankt Peter
15 March 2012	Antwerp	Belgium	Muziekcentrum TRIX
17 March 2012	Edinburgh	Scotland	Edinburgh Corn Exchange
18 March 2012	Kingston upon Hull	England	Hull University
19 March 2012	Manchester	England	Manchester Apollo
20 March 2012	Wolverhampton	England	Wolverhampton Civic Hall
22 March 2012	Plymouth	England	Plymouth Pavilions
23 March 2012	London	England	Hammersmith Apollo
North America, Leg #1; Support acts: letlive. and At the Skylines
1 April 2012	Atlanta	United States	The Masquerade
3 April 2012	Boston	United States	Paradise Rock Club
4 April 2012	Poughkeepsie	United States	The Loft
5 April 2012	Philadelphia	United States	Theater of Living Arts
6 April 2012	New York City	United States	Irving Plaza
7 April 2012	Montreal	Canada	La Tulipe
8 April 2012	Toronto	Canada	Annex Wreckroom
10 April 2012	Buffalo	United States	Club Infinity
11 April 2012	Pontiac	United States	The Crofoot
12 April 2012	Chicago	United States	The Bottom Lounge
13 April 2012	Saint Paul	United States	Station 4
15 April 2012	Winnipeg	Canada	WECC
17 April 2012	Calgary	Canada	The Den
18 April 2012	Edmonton	Canada	The Starlite Room
21 April 2012	Seattle	United States	El Corazon
22 April 2012	Portland	United States	Branx
24 April 2012	Santa Cruz	United States	Catalyst Atrium
25 April 2012	West Hollywood	United States	The Roxy
27 April 2012	San Diego	United States	Soma San Diego
28 April 2012	Pomona	United States	The Glass House
29 April 2012	Mesa	United States	Nile Theatre
1 May 2012	Las Vegas	United States	The Aruba
2 May 2012	Salt Lake City	United States	Club Sound
3 May 2012	Denver	United States	The Marquis Theatre
5 May 2012	Dallas	United States	The Door
6 May 2012	San Antonio	United States	White Rabbit
7 May 2012	Houston	United States	Warehouse Live
9 May 2012	St. Petersburg	United States	State Theatre
10 May 2012	Pompano Beach	United States	Rocketown
11 May 2012	Jacksonville	United States	Jack Rabbits
12 May 2012	Orlando	United States	The Social
Europe, Leg #2
26 May 2012	Madrid	Spain	Sonisphere Festival
1 June 2012	Nuremberg	Germany	Rock im Park
2 June 2012	Nürburg	Germany	Rock am Ring
5 June 2012	Royal Tunbridge Wells	England	Tunbridge Wells Forum
6 June 2012	Brighton	England	Concorde 2
7 June 2012	Zagreb	Croatia	Rockaj Fest
9 June 2012	Münster	Germany	Vainstream Rockfest
16 June 2012	Sulingen	Germany	Reload Festival
17 June 2012	Interlaken	Switzerland	Greenfield Festival
22 June 2012	Newport	Isle of Wight	Isle of Wight Festival
24 June 2012	London	England	Radio 1's Big Weekend
28 June 2012	Borlänge	Sweden	Peace & Love
30 June 2012	Sopron	Hungary	VOLT Festival
4 July 2012	Hradec Králové	Czech Republic	Rock for People
5 July 2012	Venice	Italy	Heineken Jammin' Festival
7 July 2012	Kinross	Scotland	T in the Park
14 July 2012	Bilbao	Spain	Bilbao BBK Live
20 July 2012	Feldkirch	Austria	Poolbar Festival
21 July 2012	Tokaj	Hungary	Hegyalja Festival
28 July 2012	Płock	Poland	Audioriver
3 August 2012	Krasnodar	Russia	Kubana Festival
Africa
9 August 2012	Cape Town	South Africa	Grand Arena
11 August 2012	Northam	South Africa	Oppikoppi
Europe, Leg #3
17 August 2012	St. Pölten	Austria	FM4 Frequency Festival
18 August 2012	Hasselt	Belgium	Pukkelpop
19 August 2012	Biddinghuizen	Netherlands	Lowlands Festival
24 August 2012	Charleville-Mézières	France	La Cabaret Vert
25 August 2012	Reading	England	Reading Festival
26 August 2012	Leeds	England	Leeds Festival
27 August 2012	Edinburgh	Scotland	Liquid Room
1 September 2012	Wiesen	Austria	Two Days a Week Festival
Oceania, Leg #2; Support act: In Hearts Wake (AU Only), Man With A Mission (JP Only)
18 September 2012	Auckland	New Zealand	The Zeal
20 September 2012	Brisbane	Australia	Eatons Hill Hotel
21 September 2012	Sydney	Australia	UNSW Roundhouse
22 September 2012	Melbourne	Australia	Billboard The Venue
23 September 2012	Melbourne	Australia	Billboard The Venue
26 September 2012	Tokyo	Japan	Ebisu Liquid Room
Europe, Leg #4
12 October 2012	Kyiv	Ukraine	Bingo Club
13 October 2012	Moscow	Russia	Arena Moscow
14 October 2012	Saint Petersburg	Russia	GlavClub
North America, Leg #2; Supporting Falling in Reverse w/ letlive. and I See Stars
17 October 2012	Salt Lake City	United States	The Complex
18 October 2012	Denver	United States	Summit Music Hall
20 October 2012	Minneapolis	United States	The Brick
21 October 2012	Des Moines	United States	Wooly's
22 October 2012	Chicago	United States	House of Blues
24 October 2012	Kansas City	United States	Beaumont Club
25 October 2012	Milwaukee	United States	Turner Hall Ballroom
26 October 2012	Sauget	United States	Pop's
27 October 2012	Indianapolis	United States	Murat Egyptian Room
29 October 2012	Columbus	United States	Newport Music Hall
31 October 2012	Cleveland	United States	House of Blues
1 November 2012	Grand Rapids	United States	The Intersection
2 November 2012	Detroit	United States	Saint Andrew's Hall
3 November 2012	Pittsburgh	United States	Stage AE
4 November 2012	Clifton Park	United States	Northern Lights
6 November 2012	Worcester	United States	The Palladium
7 November 2012	New York City	United States	Best Buy Theater
8 November 2012	Washington, D.C.	United States	Howard Theatre
9 November 2012	Philadelphia	United States	Electric Factory
11 November 2012	Stroudsburg	United States	Sherman Theater
12 November 2012	Raleigh	United States	Disco Rodeo
14 November 2012	Atlanta	United States	The Masquerade
15 November 2012	Orlando	United States	House of Blues
16 November 2012	Fort Lauderdale	United States	Revolution
17 November 2012	Tampa	United States	Cuban Club
19 November 2012	Houston	United States	Warehouse Live
20 November 2012	San Antonio	United States	White Rabbit
21 November 2012	Dallas	United States	House of Blues
24 November 2012	Lubbock	United States	Lone Star Event Center
25 November 2012	Albuquerque	United States	Sunshine Theater
27 November 2012	Tempe	United States	Marquee Theatre
28 November 2012	Los Angeles	United States	Wiltern Theatre
29 November 2012	San Diego	United States	Soma San Diego
30 November 2012	Las Vegas	United States	House of Blues
1 December 2012	Pomona	United States	Pomona Fox Theater
Europe, Leg #5; Support Acts: Cancer Bats + Engine Earz Experiment (UK Only)
6 December 2012	Manchester	England	The Ritz
7 December 2012	Manchester	England	The Ritz
9 December 2012	Newcastle upon Tyne	England	O_{2} Academy Newcastle
10 December 2012	Glasgow	Scotland	Barrowland Ballroom
11 December 2012	Glasgow	Scotland	Barrowland Ballroom
14 December 2012	Birmingham	England	HMV Institute
15 December 2012	Birmingham	England	HMV Institute
16 December 2012	London	England	The Roundhouse
17 December 2012	London	England	The Roundhouse
19 December 2012	Norwich	England	UEA
20 December 2012	Norwich	England	UEA
7 January 2013	Porto	Portugal	Hard Club
8 January 2013	Lisbon	Portugal	TMN ao Vivo
10 January 2013	Barcelona	Spain	Music Hall
12 January 2013	Bordeaux	France	Krakatoa
13 January 2013	Reggio Emilia	Italy	Temporock
15 January 2013	Zürich	Switzerland	Complex
16 January 2013	Munich	Germany	Theatrefabrik
17 January 2013	Vienna	Austria	Arena
19 January 2013	Warsaw	Poland	Club Proxima
20 January 2013	Berlin	Germany	Kesselhaus
22 January 2013	Cologne	Germany	Live Music Hall
23 January 2013	Amsterdam	Netherlands	Melkweg
24 January 2013	Groningen	Netherlands	Oosterpoort
25 January 2013	Paris	France	La Cigale
27 January 2013	Hasselt	Belgium	Muziekodroom
28 January 2013	London	England	100 Club

== Support acts ==
- At the Skylines (1 April – 12 May 2012)
- Cancer Bats (6–20 December 2012; 7–27 January 2013)
- Fine Young Firecrackers (17–18 January 2012)
- Get Cape. Wear Cape. Fly (16 January 2012)
- letlive. (28–29 February 2012; 3 April – 12 May 2012 ; 17 October – 27 November 2012)
- The James Cleaver Quintet (10–15 March 2012)
- I See Stars (17 October – 1 December 2012)
- Man With A Mission (26 September 2012)
- Tek One (17–23 March 2012)
- Tyler Mae (15 June 2011)
- Young Guns (10–23 March 2012)
- Your Demise (28–29 February 2012)

== As a supporting act ==
- Falling in Reverse (17 October – 1 December 2012)

== Personnel ==
- Roughton "Rou" Reynolds – lead vocals, electronics
- Liam "Rory" Clewlow – guitar, backing vocals
- Chris Batten – bass, backing vocals
- Rob Rolfe – drums, percussion
