= Tribalism (album) =

Compilation album by Enter Shikari
- Released: 22 February 2010
- Recorded: between 2007 and 2009
- Genre: Drum and bass; electronicore; post-hardcore; alternative metal
- Length: 1:01:41
- Label: Ambush Reality
- Producer: Enter Shikari, Andy Gray

Enter Shikari chronology
Common Dreads (2009)	Tribalism (2010)	A Flash Flood of Colour (2012)

Professional ratings
Review scores
Source	Rating
AllMusic	3/5 stars
Kerrang!	3/5
Rock Sound	8/10
Under the Gun Review	4.5/10

Tribalism is the second compilation album by the English rock band Enter Shikari, released on 22 February 2010. The album contains two brand new tracks, b-sides, remixes and live tracks. A limited-edition version of the album was released in a boxset package also containing a sticker, poster and badges. Only 1,000 of this edition were made.

== History ==
The album's name and track listing was revealed on 19 January 2010. Songs on the compilation were recorded between 2007 and 2009.

A music video for the song "Thumper" was released on 26 January 2010. The video for "Thumper" shows the band in black-and-white and ending up looking cartoon-esque, not unlike A-Ha's "Take On Me", although the band members' faces are distorted, with wide mouths, pointed noses and sunken eyes. This type of animation is called rotoscoping. The video was directed and animated by Joseph Pierce.

"All Eyes On the Saint" was previously released as bonus track for the Japanese and American iTunes version of Common Dreads. The song itself is about the execution of Saint Alban.

== Track listing ==
All tracks are written by Enter Shikari.

Tribalism
No.	Title	Length
1.	"Tribalism"	5:05
2.	"Thumper"	3:44
3.	"All Eyes on the Saint"	5:51
4.	"We Can Breathe in Space" (Radio Edit)	4:03
5.	"Insomnia" (Faithless cover; Live @ Brixton '07)	4:32
6.	"Juggernauts" (Nero Remix)	5:01
7.	"No Sleep Tonight" (The Qemists Remix)	5:58
8.	"Wall" (High Contrast Remix)	4:32
9.	"No Sleep Tonight" (Mistabishi Remix)	4:16
10.	"Juggernauts" (Blue Bear's True Tiger Remix)	4:55
11.	"No Sleep Tonight" (Rout Remix)	4:11
12.	"No Sleep Tonight" (LightsGoBlue Remix)	4:37
13.	"Havoc A" (Live '09)	1:47
14.	"Labyrinth" (Live '09)	3:24
15.	"Hectic" (Live '09)	4:01
Total length:		1:01:41

== Personnel ==
- Roughton "Rou" Reynolds – vocals, electronics
- Liam "Rory" Clewlow – guitar, vocals
- Chris Batten – bass, vocals, co-lead vocals on "Tribalism" and "We Can Breathe in Space"
- Rob Rolfe – drums, percussion
