= The Mindsweep: Hospitalised =

Remix album by Enter Shikari & Hospital Records
- Released: 30 October 2015
- Genre: Drum and bass
- Length: 55:43
- Label: Ambush Reality; PIAS; Hospital

Enter Shikari & Hospital Records chronology
| The Mindsweep (2015) | The Mindsweep: Hospitalised (2015) | The Spark (2017) |

Singles from The Mindsweep: Hospitalised
- 1. "Slipshod (Urbandawn Remix)" Released: 16 October 2015

The Mindsweep: Hospitalised is a remix album by the English rock band Enter Shikari, released on 30 October 2015. It featured remixes from drum and bass London-based label Hospital Records artists of songs taken from the band's fourth studio album The Mindsweep.

== Track listing ==
All lyrics are written by Roughton "Rou" Reynolds (except "Interlude", written by The Erised).

The Mindsweep: Hospitalised track listing
| No. | Title | Length |
|---|---|---|
| 1. | "The Appeal & the Mindsweep I" (Metrik Remix) | 3:58 |
| 2. | "The One True Colour" (Keeno Remix) | 4:57 |
| 3. | "Anaesthetist" (Reso Remix) | 4:31 |
| 4. | "The Last Garrison" (S.P.Y. Remix) | 4:18 |
| 5. | "Never Let Go of the Microscope" (Etherwood Remix) | 4:52 |
| 6. | "Myopia" (Bop Remix) | 5:14 |
| 7. | "Torn Apart" (Hugh Hardie Remix) | 4:40 |
| 8. | "Interlude" (The Erised Remix) | 4:01 |
| 9. | "The Bank of England" (Lynx Remix) | 4:29 |
| 10. | "There's a Price on Your Head" (Danny Byrd Remix) | 4:09 |
| 11. | "Dear Future Historians..." (London Elektricity Remix) | 5:43 |
| 12. | "The Appeal & the Mindsweep II" (Krakota Remix) | 4:51 |

Digital and vinyl bonus track
| No. | Title | Length |
|---|---|---|
| 13. | "Slipshod" (Urbandawn Remix) | 5:04 |

== Charts ==
Chart performance for The Mindsweep: Hospitalised
| Chart (2015) | Peak position |
|---|---|
| UK Albums (OCC) | 68 |
| UK Dance Albums (OCC) | 10 |
