= A Flash Flood of Colour =

Studio album by Enter Shikari
- Released: 16 January 2012
- Recorded: May–June 2011
- Studios: Karma Sound Studios, Bang Saray, Thailand; The Fortress, London
- Genres: Post-hardcore; electronicore; dubstep; drum and bass; alternative metal
- Length: 42:29
- Label: Ambush Reality
- Producers: Dan Weller, Enter Shikari

Enter Shikari chronology
| Tribalism (2010) | A Flash Flood of Colour (2012) | The Mindsweep (2015) |

Alternative cover
- First pressing vinyl artwork

Singles from A Flash Flood of Colour
- 1. "Sssnakepit" Released: 20 September 2011; 2. "Gandhi Mate, Gandhi" Released: 2 December 2011; 3. "Arguing with Thermometers" Released: 9 January 2012; 4. "Warm Smiles Do Not Make You Welcome Here" Released: 29 June 2012

A Flash Flood of Colour is the third studio album by the English rock band Enter Shikari, and was produced by Dan Weller. The album was recorded in May and June 2011 at Karma Sound Studios in Bang Saray, Thailand, and at the Fortress in London, United Kingdom. It was released internationally on 16 January 2012 by Ambush Reality, the band's record label in the United Kingdom, and Hopeless Records in North America.

Lyrically, the album deals with current affairs (primarily the Great Recession). It confronts flaws in government action to end the global recession, also touching on the political situation in Israel and climate change. A Flash Flood of Colour demonstrated Enter Shikari's continued fusion of electronic and rock music influences. The album's cover depicts an inverted social hierarchy.

A Flash Flood of Colour received generally positive reviews from music critics and an average Metacritic score of 75 out of 100. It debuted at number four on the UK Albums Chart after a band-led campaign to get the album to number one, and appeared on several album-of-the-year lists. To promote the album, Enter Shikari made A Flash Flood of Colour World Tour.

== Background and recording ==
Enter Shikari took a different lyrical direction with the release of their 2009 album Common Dreads, which focused on financial meltdown, economic collapse and widespread discontent. Journalists such as Ian Winwood credited the band's lyrical direction as a reaction to the evolution of politics since their 2007 debut album, Take to the Skies; there is now "ongoing Orwellian overseas conflicts, riots in England's major cities, endless austerity programmes the end date of which stretch years into the distance". The change in lyrics began with Reynolds' belief that music is an effective way of conveying political ideas.

The record was produced by former SikTh guitarist Dan Weller, who helped with guitar production on Common Dreads, and sound engineer Tim Morris. Enter Shikari recorded the album in May and June 2011, primarily at Karma Sound Studios in Bang Saray, Thailand. Its recording began at Weller's Old Street London-based recording studio. When he told the band that a friend owned a recording studio in Thailand, it became a running joke that they would record there instead. Eventually, they decided that it would be financially, logistically and artistically advantageous to record at Karma Sound. The studio in Thailand was described by drummer Rob Rolfe as "four walls in a little compound in the middle of the jungle" an hour-and-a-half drive south of Bangkok and a "fantastic studio in paradise". The band recorded the album's music before adding the vocals, since Reynolds knew the album's themes and that it would be "uniting and empowering". The album was mixed in Vancouver by Mike Fraser.

Within the first 10 days of recording, the album's most-complete songs were its most aggressive—particularly the tentatively-titled "Tyrannosaurus" (later known as "Hello Tyrannosaurus, Meet Tyrannicide"). During its production, the album went through several changes; "Stalemate" was intended as an acoustic introduction, and "System Meltdown" was intended to be a single song. Recording was completed within a month.

== Style and themes ==
A Flash Flood of Colour is noted for its fusion of electronic music, rock music, hip-hop and hardcore punk. The album is considered to "contain at least two or three different genres within each track", blending post-hardcore, electronicore, dubstep, drum and bass, and alternative metal, with elements of other styles (alternative rock, industrial, techno, trance, electro, British hip-hop, grime and metalcore). with metal elements.

The theme of A Flash Flood of Colour is politically progressive. The album's treatment of current affairs and environmental issues takes aim "at the failings of capitalism, the hypocrisy of modern politics and the blatant disregard of human health and happiness" and has been compared to the calculated approach of the Occupy movement, rather than an ensuing class conflict. Despite its political themes, Reynolds denied that the album was politically motivated: "This album is anti-politics. We say that politics is an outdated system. It is time that we embrace technological developments and no longer have to rely on a rule. Our lives should develop according to scientific findings." He described A Flash Flood of Colour's recurring theme as "perspective": "We're not trying to think subjectively." The Real News, Democracy Now! and journalist John Pilger have all influenced Reynolds' political views.

=== Tracks ===
Sssnakepit
The third track and lead single of the album, "Sssnakepit" "push[es] their guitar-dubstep to gnarlier places than before". Its party lyrics are a break from A Flash Flood of Colour's socio-political themes.

A Flash Flood of Colour opens with the trance-like, spoken-word introduction to "System...", featuring synthesised strings, a "battle cry" buildup and an outline of the album's lyrical themes (metaphorically comparing Britain's economy to an eroded cliff-top house). The next track, "...Meltdown", opens with a dubstep-influenced breakdown. Both songs "surf a plateau musically", highlighting the album's diversity and acting as a "paean to internationalist idealism". "Ssssnakepit" mixes jungle music "fury", thrash metal guitar riffing, an electro interlude and a catchy chorus; Reynolds also noted drum-and-bass and hardcore-punk influences. "Ssssnakepit" focuses on partying more than politics; Reynolds said about the song, "It’s hard to write positive songs with everything going on in the world, but this track is basically one full-on party—it's about cherishing your friendships and living compassionately."

The title of "Arguing with Thermometers" refers to climate change deniers. "Stalemate" is a ballad about war profiteering, condemning Israel's use of white phosphorus in Palestine and noting that wars "make trillionaires out of billionaires". The song's combination of acoustic guitar, vocal harmonies and rock drumming produces a "radio-friendly hook".

Pack Of Thieves
The album's ninth track, "Pack Of Thieves" conveys positivity and determination.

With its "furious, anarchist edge", "Gandhi Mate, Gandhi" focuses on the distinction between social and economic stability, summarising capitalism as "a long outdated system ... that does nothing but divide and segregate us". The song has been seen as supporting the Occupy London movement; Reynolds called it a "very frustrated and confused song" reflecting the current Zeitgeist: "People know we have the resources, the creativity, and the ingenuity to do better than what we have at the moment and are struggling to come to terms with the short term love of money over the long-term stability and progression of our species." The song focuses on two characters; Reynolds' vocals supply a revolutionary perspective, and Rory Clewlow's are those of a person in power. "Gandhi mate, Gandhi" has unconventional lyrics for its characters; "Yabba Dabba do one, son" was described by Reynolds as the product of a drunken MC battle, and during the song the other band members pause and urge Reynolds to calm down. Reynolds described "Gandhi mate, Gandhi" as a "lively electro influenced dubstep" and a "rap rock pileup" textured over "wobbly dubstep bass".

"Warm Smiles Do Not Make You Welcome Here" incorporates stadium rock into Enter Shikari's typical style. Reynolds described "Hello Tyrannosaurus, Meet Tyrannicide" as a critique of certain democracies which are "polite dictatorships", specifically referring to those in the Arab Spring movement. The album closes with "Constellations", a "rallying call about the future of the human race". With a "swirling" string quartet resembling "System..."'s, the anthemic song has a post-rock sound.

== Cover and packaging ==
The title of A Flash Flood of Colour was intended to describe the album's music, and Reynolds noted its colourful blend of musical genres. He said that the band wanted a title with a "big sound" which was positive and forward-thinking, and it derives from the lyrics of "Warm Smiles Do Not Make You Welcome Here".

The cover art is a reversal of society's hierarchical structure based on social stratification. Although it was introduced to Enter Shikari as a set design for their live shows, they thought it would be a "solid symbol" for the album. Guitarist Rory Clewlow described the cover art: "Our society is often depicted as a pyramid, with the few at the top with all the wealth and the masses at the bottom with no wealth, but supporting the pyramid for the few at the top. Our upside down triangle represents this system being flipped on [its] head."

== Release and promotion ==
Enter Shikari released two non-album singles, "Destabilise" and "Quelle Surprise", before A Flash Flood of Colour's release. Although "Quelle Surprise" (released on 19 May 2011) was intended as the first single from the new album, it was later decided that it (like "Destabilise") would be a stand-alone track. They were included as bonus tracks on selected versions of A Flash Flood of Colour.

The album's first single, "Sssnakepit", was released on 20 September 2011. On 5 December "Gandhi Mate, Gandhi" was released as a preview of the album. On 5 January 2012 Enter Shikari released the studio version of "Arguing with Thermometers" on their YouTube page, and it was played on Lowe's show as his "Hottest Record in the World". On 4 January 2013, the band released an animated music video for "Hello Tyrannosaurus, Meet Tyrannicide" on their YouTube page.

When it was released, A Flash Flood of Colour was one of two new entries in the United Kingdom's top 20 mainstream album chart (the other was Tribes' début album, Baby). The album reached number one halfway through its first week, with over 2,500 copies sold (rivalling Adele, Bruno Mars and Ed Sheeran). After the announcement of the midweek chart, Rou Reynolds called A Flash Flood of Colour's success a victory for "independent music, for socially conscious music and for alternative music" in a blog post on the Enter Shikari website. Although the album fell to fourth behind 21, + and Mylo Xyloto, it reached number one on the UK Rock Chart and number two on the UK independent album charts and sold over 19,000 copies.

=== Tour and performances ===
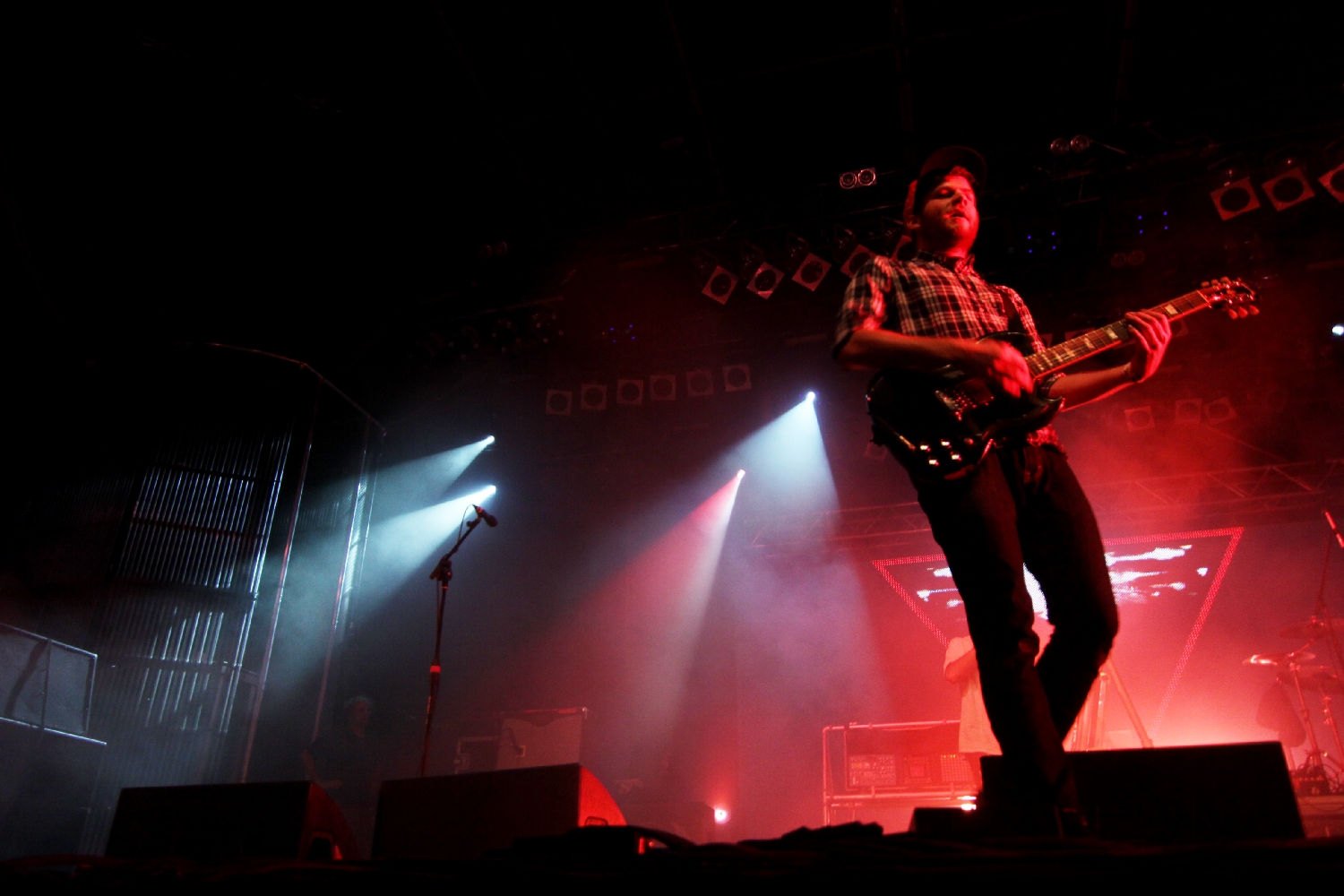
Enter Shikari guitarist Rory Clewlow. Due to their growing global popularity, the band took their live production (pictured behind Clewlow) to North America.

As a "first big test" Enter Shikari introduced songs from A Flash Flood of Colour at Soundwave in Australia, and they were pleased by the positive reaction to their new music. When the band was touring at the time of the album's release, they distributed leaflets with interviews answering questions they are not usually asked. On 12 February 2012 they played a subdued, well-attended show at the Bull and Gate, a Kentish Town pub, which was filmed for Scuzz. The show, filmed and edited by Stand Your Ground Media, aired on 31 March at 5 pm. Enter Shikari played three small shows in the UK to celebrate the album's release: 16 January 2012 (its release date) at the Borderline in London, 17 January at the Hippodrome in Kingston and 18 January at the Cockpit in Leeds. The shows were sponsored by HMV, Banquet Records, Jumbo Records and Crash Records; those pre-ordering from these sources received tickets to the shows.

After the album's release, Enter Shikari toured Europe, North America and Australasia with a full production and light show. The band's touring schedule, and their confidence, expanded across the United States and they played with two- or three-band bills to play longer sets.

== Reception ==
=== Critical reception ===
Professional ratings
Aggregate scores
| Source | Rating |
|---|---|
| Metacritic | 75/100 |
Review scores
| Source | Rating |
| AbsolutePunk | (8/10) |
| AllMusic | 3/5 stars |
| Alternative Press | 4.5/5 stars |
| BBC Music | Favourable |
| CraveOnline | 8/10 stars |
| Drowned In Sound | (5/10) |
| The Fly | 4/5 stars |
| Kerrang! | 4/5 stars |
| NME | (8/10) |
| Rock Sound | 9/10 stars |

A Flash Flood of Colour received generally positive reviews from music critics. At Metacritic, which assigns a normalised rating out of 100 to reviews from mainstream critics, the album received a score of 75 based on 13 reviews (categorised as "generally favorable reviews"). Drew Beringer of AbsolutePunk praised the album in an eight-out-of-ten review: "The quartet has a much bigger goal than just getting kids to dance to their breakdowns, rather they focus on putting a lot of substance into each track, hoping to inspire this generation to take a stand and make change amongst the broken systems throughout the world".

Ian Winwood gave the album four out of five "Ks" for the British magazine Kerrang!, an "excellent" review. He called the music far more upbeat than Enter Shikari's serious message: "This 11-song set is a good deal of fun to listen to, even if its lyrics' subject matters are the exact opposite." Winwood also reviewed the album favourably for BBC Music, comparing its lyrics to the King Blues' Punk & Poetry and calling Enter Shikari "the only other mainstream-breaching British rock band concerning itself with the news of the world". Johnny Firecloud gave the album an eight-out-of-ten rating on CraveOnline: "Enter Shikari have found a balance while honing a voice of rebellion – at a time where tearing down boundaries and microanalyzing the current structure is more vital and valuable than ever before in our lives." Iain Moffat of The Fly said of the album that 'Disenchantment should always be this spellbinding.' In NME, Dan Martin gave the album an eight-out-of-ten rating: "All of that surface tension lands Enter Shikari in a pretty powerful position for their third – and, as the title promises fabulously, they respond to the challenge in explosive style to deliver something like their defining statement." Rocksound writer Ryan Bird gave the album a nine-out-of-ten score, praising the band for their emotional cultural and sonic development and noting the importance of their message: "In a world edging ever closer to complete and utter destruction, Enter Shikari remain fearless and uncompromising leaders in a field of one."

Not all reviews were positive. Jon O'Brien of AllMusic gave the album three stars out of five, saying that the album's "rebellious stance rarely transcends "Beginners Guide to Politics" territory" and considering its music a "hyperactive Wall of Sound". O'Brien summarised his review by calling the album "a demanding and often exhausting listen" but also "a call to arms which the flagging U.K. guitar band scene could do with more of." John Calvert of Drowned In Sound gave the album a five-out-of-ten rating, calling its sound "sports metal" and noting a decline in Enter Shikari's music: "Forward rewind to 2011 and it's all Nero-grade dubstep, amateurish drum'n'bass and mid-twenties pot bellies."

=== Accolades ===
| Publication | Country | Accolade | Year | Rank |
|---|---|---|---|---|
| Alternative Press | USA | AP's 10 Essential albums of 2012 | 2013 | 2 |
| Dead Press | UK | Top 10 Albums Of The Year | 2013 | 9 |
| Kerrang! | UK | The Ultimate Rock Review | 2013 | 1 |
| Ourzone Magazine | UK | Albums of the Year 2012 | 2013 | 3 |
| Rock Sound | UK | Top 50 Albums of the year | 2013 | 15 |
| NME | UK | NME's 50 Best Albums of 2012 | 2013 | 37 |

== Track listing ==
All lyrics are written by Roughton "Rou" Reynolds; all music is composed by Enter Shikari.

| No. | Title | Length |
|---|---|---|
| 1. | "System..." | 1:57 |
| 2. | "...Meltdown" | 3:24 |
| 3. | "Sssnakepit" | 3:26 |
| 4. | "Search Party" | 4:06 |
| 5. | "Arguing with Thermometers" | 3:22 |
| 6. | "Stalemate" | 4:18 |
| 7. | "Gandhi Mate, Gandhi" | 4:26 |
| 8. | "Warm Smiles Do Not Make You Welcome Here" | 4:36 |
| 9. | "Pack of Thieves" | 3:58 |
| 10. | "Hello Tyrannosaurus, Meet Tyrannicide" | 3:44 |
| 11. | "Constellations" | 4:59 |
| Total length: | | 42:29 |

UK and Ireland iTunes deluxe edition
| No. | Title | Length |
|---|---|---|
| 12. | "Quelle Surprise" | 4:35 |
| 13. | "Destabilise" | 4:31 |
| 14. | "Quelle Surprise" (Rout VIP Mix) | 5:19 |
| 15. | "Intro/Destabilise" (Live from The Electric Ballroom Oct 2011) | 6:17 |
| 16. | "Sssnakepit" (Live from The Electric Ballroom Oct 2011) | 3:33 |
| 17. | "Quelle Surprise" (Live from The Electric Ballroom Oct 2011) | 7:23 |
| 18. | "OK, Time For Plan B" (Live from The Electric Ballroom Oct 2011) | 5:11 |

US iTunes deluxe edition
| No. | Title | Length |
|---|---|---|
| 12. | "Sssnakepit" (Hamilton Remix) | 4:52 |
| 13. | "Sssnakepit" (Serial Killaz Remix) | 5:31 |
| 14. | "Quelle Surprise" (Music Video) | 4:34 |

Redux Version
| No. | Title | Length |
|---|---|---|
| 12. | "Quelle Surprise" | 4:34 |
| 13. | "Destabilise" | 4:31 |
| 14. | "Intro/Destabilise" (Live from The Electric Ballroom Oct 2011) | 6:16 |
| 15. | "Sssnakepit" (Live from The Electric Ballroom Oct 2011) | 3:31 |
| 16. | "Quelle Surprise" (Live from The Electric Ballroom Oct 2011) | 7:13 |
| 17. | "Ok, Time for Plan B" (Live from The Electric Ballroom Oct 2011) | 5:10 |
| 18. | "System / Meltdown" (Live from the Hammersmith Apollo) | 7:07 |
| 19. | "The Feast" (Live from the Hammersmith Apollo) | 4:17 |
| 20. | "Gandhi Mate, Gandhi" (Live from the Hammersmith Apollo) | 5:11 |
| 21. | "Quelle Surprise" (Live from the Hammersmith Apollo) | 7:03 |
| 22. | "Hello Tyrannosaurus, Meet Tyrannicide" (Live from the Hammersmith Apollo) | 5:48 |
| 23. | "Stalemate" (Live from the Hammersmith Apollo) | 4:49 |
| 24. | "Enter Shikari" (Live from the Hammersmith Apollo) | 6:14 |
| 25. | "Return to Energiser" (Live from the Hammersmith Apollo) | 8:38 |
| 26. | "Sssnakepit" (Live from the Hammersmith Apollo) | 5:52 |
| 27. | "Destabilise" (Rout Remix) | 5:28 |
| 28. | "Quelle Surprise" (Rout Remix) | 5:19 |
| 29. | "Sssnakepit" (Hamilton Remix) | 4:51 |
| 30. | "Sssnakepit" (Serial Killaz Remix) | 5:30 |
| 31. | "Sssnakepit" (Rout Remix) | 4:31 |
| 32. | "Arguing With Thermometers" (Calvertron Remix) | 4:01 |
| 33. | "Arguing With Thermometers" (Goth-Trad Remix) | 5:05 |
| 34. | "Arguing With Thermometers" (Taz Buckfaster Remix) | 4:49 |
| 35. | "Warm Smiles Do Not Make You Welcome Here" (Mosquito Remix) | 4:49 |
| 36. | "Warm Smiles Do Not Make You Welcome Here" (Tek-One Remix) | 3:46 |
| 37. | "Warm Smiles Do Not Make You Welcome Here" (Azura Dub) | 4:03 |
| 38. | "Warm Smiles Do Not Make You Welcome Here" (Tyler Mae Remix) | 6:48 |
| 39. | "Warm Smiles Do Not Make You Welcome Here" (Alex Light Remix) | 3:41 |
| 40. | "Pack of Thieves" (Rory C Mix) | 6:56 |
| 41. | "Pack of Thieves" (Sgt. Rolfy's Bell End Remix) | 4:57 |

Limited edition bonus DVD
DVD bonus dell'edizione limitata

| No. | Title | Length |
|---|---|---|
| 1. | "Phenakistiscope" (Documentary) |
| 2. | "Bonus Features" (Live & Promo Videos) |

== Personnel ==
Enter Shikari

- Roughton "Rou" Reynolds – lead vocals, electronics, acoustic guitar, celesta, piano, brass and string arrangements, lyrics
- Liam "Rory" Clewlow – guitar, vocals
- Chris Batten – bass, vocals
- Rob Rolfe – drums, percussion, vocals

Additional personnel

- Dan Weller – producer
- Tim Morris – engineer
- Bobo Ekrangsi – engineer
- Mike Fraser – mixing

== Charts and certifications ==
=== Charts ===
| Chart (2012) | Peak position |
|---|---|
| Australian Albums Chart | 32 |
| Austrian Albums Chart | 35 |
| Belgian (Flanders) Albums Chart | 42 |
| Dutch Albums Chart | 74 |
| German Albums Chart | 23 |
| Japanese Albums Chart | 81 |
| Irish Albums Chart | 69 |
| UK Albums Chart | 4 |
| UK Indie Chart | 2 |
| UK Rock Chart | 1 |
| US Billboard 200 | 67 |
| US Hard Rock Albums | 5 |
| US Independent Albums | 8 |
| US Rock Albums | 19 |

=== Certifications ===
| Region | Certification | Certified units/sales |
|---|---|---|
| United Kingdom (BPI) | Silver | 60,000^{*} |
^{*} Sales figures based on certification alone.
