= Rat Race (Enter Shikari song) =

Single by Enter Shikari

from the album Rat Race EP
- Released: 31 October 2013
- Genre: Electronicore, post-hardcore
- Length: 3:17
- Label: Ambush Reality, Hopeless
- Composer: Enter Shikari
- Lyricist: Rou Reynolds
- Producers: Enter Shikari, Dan Weller

Enter Shikari singles chronology
| "Radiate" (2013) | "Rat Race" (2013) | "The Last Garrison" (2014) |

Enter Shikari chronology
| Live in London. W6. March 2012 (2012) | Rat Race EP (2013) | Live in the Barrowland (2013) |

"Rat Race" is a single by British rock band Enter Shikari. The song was first played on Zane Lowe's BBC Radio 1 show on the evening of 31 October 2013. The single was released with a remix of the song Radiate by Enter Shikari's alter ego Shikari Sound System. The band also released an EP, which compiled the two previous singles "The Paddington Frisk" and "Radiate".

The "Rat Race" single peaked at #77 on the UK Singles Chart on 16 November 2013.

== Music video ==
The music video was released on the band's official YouTube page on 31 October.

== Track listings ==
Digital download

1. "Rat Race" – 3:17
2. "Radiate" (Shikari Sound System Remix) – 3:49

CD

1. "Rat Race" – 3:17
2. "Rat Race" (Radio Edit) – 3:00
3. "Radiate" (Shikari Sound System Remix) – 3:49

EP

1. "The Paddington Frisk" – 1:16
2. "Radiate" – 4:32
3. "Rat Race" – 3:17
4. "Radiate" (Shikari Sound System Remix) – 3:49

== Personnel ==
Enter Shikari

- Roughton "Rou" Reynolds – lead vocals, synthesizer, keyboards, programming
- Chris Batten – bass guitar, vocals, co-lead vocals on "Rat Race"
- Liam "Rory" Clewlow – guitar, vocals
- Rob Rolfe – drums, percussion, backing vocals
