= Warm Smiles Do Not Make You Welcome Here =

Single by Enter Shikari

from the album A Flash Flood of Colour
- Released: 29 June 2012
- Recorded: May–June 2011
- Genre: Electronica; progressive metal; emo-metal
- Length: 4:38 (album version); 3:44 (radio edit)
- Label: Ambush Reality
- Songwriter(s): Chris Batten, Rou Reynolds, Rob Rolfe, Rory Clewlow
- Producer(s): Enter Shikari, Dan Weller

Enter Shikari singles chronology
"Arguing with Thermometers" (2012)	"Warm Smiles Do Not Make You Welcome Here" (2012)	"The Paddington Frisk" (2013)

"Warm Smiles Do Not Make You Welcome Here" is a single by British rock band Enter Shikari from their 2012 album A Flash Flood of Colour. The song's title is a re-used title from an old song played by the band in their early days.

== Music video ==
The music video alternates between the band performing in a warehouse and company executives mass-producing clones of the band. The band then perform energetically opposite a lifeless version of themselves, before detonating an explosive and destroying the chimneys, polluting the air in the distance, seen in the sunglasses of the company executive. The video was released on the band's official YouTube page on 2 July 2012. The video was directed by Raul Gonzo and produced by Robby Starbuck. Extra video work was done by KODE Media.

== Track listing ==
No.	Title	Length
1.	"Warm Smiles Do Not Make You Welcome Here"	4:38
2.	"Warm Smiles Do Not Make You Welcome Here" (Mosquito Mix)	4:49
3.	"Warm Smiles Do Not Make You Welcome Here" (Tek One Mix)	3:44
4.	"Warm Smiles Do Not Make You Welcome Here" (Azura Dub)	4:01
5.	"Warm Smiles Do Not Make You Welcome Here" (Tyler Mae Mix)	6:46

== Band members ==
- Roughton "Rou" Reynolds – lead vocals, synthesizer, keyboards, programming
- Chris Batten – bass guitar, backing vocals
- Liam "Rory" Clewlow – guitar, backing vocals
- Rob Rolfe – drums, percussion, backing vocals
