= Thumper (song) =

Single by Enter Shikari

from the album Tribalism
- Released: 12 February 2010
- Recorded: 2009
- Genre: Electronica; post-punk; drum and bass
- Length: 3:43
- Label: Ambush Reality
- Songwriter(s): Chris Batten, Rou Reynolds, Rob Rolfe, Rory Clewlow

Enter Shikari singles chronology
"No Sleep Tonight" (2009)	"Thumper" (2010)	"Destabilise" (2010)

"Thumper" is a single by British rock band Enter Shikari from their 2010 compilation album Tribalism. It was released on 12 February 2010 on iTunes.

== Music video ==
Directed and animated by Joseph Pierce, the video shows the band performing in black and white. The video also uses a Rotoscoping technique, much like A-ha's Take On Me video.

== Track listing ==
Promo single

No.	Title	Length
1.	"Thumper"	3:43

DVD single

No.	Title	Length
1.	"Thumper" (music video)	3:43

== Personnel ==
Enter Shikari

- Roughton "Rou" Reynolds – lead vocals, synthesizer, keyboards, programming
- Chris Batten – bass guitar, backing vocals
- Liam "Rory" Clewlow – guitar, backing vocals
- Rob Rolfe – drums, percussion, background vocals

Production

- Enter Shikari – production, mixing
- Andy Gray – production, mixing
- Dan Weller – guitar production

== Charts ==
Chart (2009)	Peak position
UK Rock & Metal (OCC)	7
