= No Sleep Tonight (Enter Shikari song) =

Single by Enter Shikari

from the album Common Dreads
- Released: 31 July 2009
- Recorded: September 2008–February 2009 at Arreton Manor, UK
- Genre: Alternative rock, drum and bass
- Length: 4:16
- Label: Ambush Reality
- Songwriter(s): Chris Batten, Rou Reynolds, Rob Rolfe, Rory Clewlow
- Producer(s): Andy Gray, Enter Shikari

Enter Shikari singles chronology
"Juggernauts" (2009)	"No Sleep Tonight" (2009)	"Thumper" (2010)

No Sleep Tonight is a song by British rock band Enter Shikari, taken from their second studio album, Common Dreads. The song was released as a single on 31 July 2009.

== Background and writing ==
The song was produced by Andy Gray at Arreton Manor in the Isle of Wight. Lead Singer Rou Reynolds explained to Kerrang!: "This song is about conscience and how more and more oil companies are simply concerned with short-term profit and will pay scientists to speak out about climate change."

== Music video ==
The music video was released in early July 2009, on TV and can be seen on Enter Shikari's YouTube official account.

It was directed by Shane Davey (who also directed the video for the band's last single Juggernauts) and features many of the band's fans. It follows the story of a man who accidentally knocks into lead singer Rou Reynolds as he's on the phone, comes home from work, followed by Rou and is then continuously told "You're not getting any sleep tonight". We the audience get to see his failing marriage end due to his arrogant and loveless ways.

== Charts ==
Chart (2009)	Peak position
UK Singles Chart	63

== Track listing ==
CD

1. "No Sleep Tonight" - 4:16
2. "No Sleep Tonight" (Mistabishi Remix) - 4:16
3. "No Sleep Tonight" (LightsGoBlue Remix) - 4:37

Digital download

1. "No Sleep Tonight" - 4:16
2. "Juggernauts" (BBC Radio 1 Live Version) - 4:49
3. "No Sleep Tonight" (The Qemists Remix) - 6:00

Vinyl 7"

1. "No Sleep Tonight" (The Qemists Remix) - 6:00
2. "No Sleep Tonight" (Rout Remix) - 4:11
