= Radiate (Enter Shikari song) =

Single by Enter Shikari

from the album Rat Race EP
- Released: 10 June 2013
- Recorded: February 2013
- Genre: Electronicore, post-hardcore
- Length: 4:32
- Label: Ambush Reality
- Songwriters: Chris Batten, Rou Reynolds, Rob Rolfe, Rory Clewlow
- Producers: Enter Shikari, Dan Weller

Enter Shikari singles chronology
"The Paddington Frisk" (2013)	"Radiate" (2013)	"Rat Race" (2013)

"Radiate" is a single by British rock band Enter Shikari. The song was first played on Zane Lowe's BBC Radio 1 show on the evening of 10 June 2013 and was his single of the week. The single peaked at #79 on the UK Singles Chart on 22 June 2013.

== Music video ==
The music video was released on the band's official YouTube channel on 10 June. The video includes the band, who are handcuffed, with their guitars un-stringed, drums without skins and black bars over their eyes. The video contains the lyrics as an overlay and was directed by Joshua Halling.

== Track listing ==
No.	Title	Length
1.	"Radiate"	4:32

== Band members ==
- Roughton "Rou" Reynolds – lead vocals, synthesizer, keyboards, programming, guitar
- Chris Batten – bass guitar, backing vocals
- Liam "Rory" Clewlow – guitar, backing vocals
- Rob Rolfe – drums, percussion, backing vocals
