= The Last Garrison =

Single by Enter Shikari

from the album The Mindsweep
- Released: 20 October 2014
- Recorded: 2014
- Genre: Post-hardcore; electronic rock; drum and bass
- Length: 3:42
- Label: Ambush Reality, Hopeless Records, PIAS Recordings
- Songwriter(s): Chris Batten, Rou Reynolds, Rob Rolfe, Rory Clewlow
- Producer(s): Enter Shikari, Dan Weller

Enter Shikari singles chronology
"Rat Race" (2013)	"The Last Garrison" (2014)	"Anaesthetist" (2015)

"The Last Garrison" is the first single taken from the fourth studio album by British rock band Enter Shikari, The Mindsweep. The song was first played on Zane Lowe's BBC Radio 1 show on 20 October 2014, while the single was released on iTunes and Spotify on the same day.

== Music video ==
The music video, directed by Oleg Rooz, was released on the band's official YouTube page on 11 November 2014.

== Track listing ==
All lyrics are written by Rou Reynolds; all music is composed by Enter Shikari

No.	Title	Length
1.	"The Last Garrison"	3:42

== Band members ==
- Roughton "Rou" Reynolds – lead vocals, synthesizer, keyboards, programming
- Liam "Rory" Clewlow – guitar, vocals
- Chris Batten – bass guitar, vocals
- Rob Rolfe – drums, percussion, backing vocals

== Chart performance ==
Chart (2014)	Peak position
UK Rock Chart	9
UK Indie Chart	21
