= Anaesthetist (song) =

Single by Enter Shikari

from the album The Mindsweep
- Released: 5 January 2015
- Recorded: 2014
- Genre: Grime; heavy metal; big beat
- Length: 2:55
- Label: Ambush Reality, Hopeless, PIAS
- Composer: Enter Shikari
- Lyricist: Rou Reynolds
- Producers: Enter Shikari, Dan Weller

Enter Shikari singles chronology
"The Last Garrison" (2014)	"Anaesthetist" (2015)	"Slipshod (Urbandawn Remix)" (2015)

"Anaesthetist" is the second single taken from the album The Mindsweep by British rock band Enter Shikari. The song was first played on Zane Lowe's BBC Radio 1 show on 5 January 2015. An official video for the song directed by Mike Tyler was released on YouTube later the same day.

"Anaesthetist" received the Kerrang! Award for Best Single.

== Subject matter ==
The song "Anaesthetist" is about the privatisation of Britain's National Health Service. On the song, frontman Rou Reynolds stated "We seem to have reached a stage of such capitalistic fervour, that we believe it acceptable to punish people for ill health. By charging for healthcare we act as if illness is nothing but one’s own problem, but what is the purpose and advantage of 'civilisation' if it is not helping the most vulnerable within society? The lottery of birth can offer us a wealth of bad luck when it comes to our health and the safety nets are being pulled in as the desire to boost profit overtakes the desire to help people."

== Track listing ==
All lyrics are written by Rou Reynolds; all music is composed by Enter Shikari.

No.	Title	Length
1.	"Anaesthetist"	2:55
2.	"Anaesthetist" (Koven Remix)	6:45

== Band members ==
- Roughton "Rou" Reynolds – lead vocals, synthesizer, keyboards, programming
- Chris Batten – bass guitar, vocals
- Liam "Rory" Clewlow – guitar, vocals
- Rob Rolfe – drums, percussion, backing vocals

== Chart performance ==
Chart (2015)	Peak position
UK Rock Chart	9
UK Indie Chart	17
