= The Cockpit (Leeds) =

Former live music venue in Leeds, West Yorkshire, England

The Cockpit, Leeds
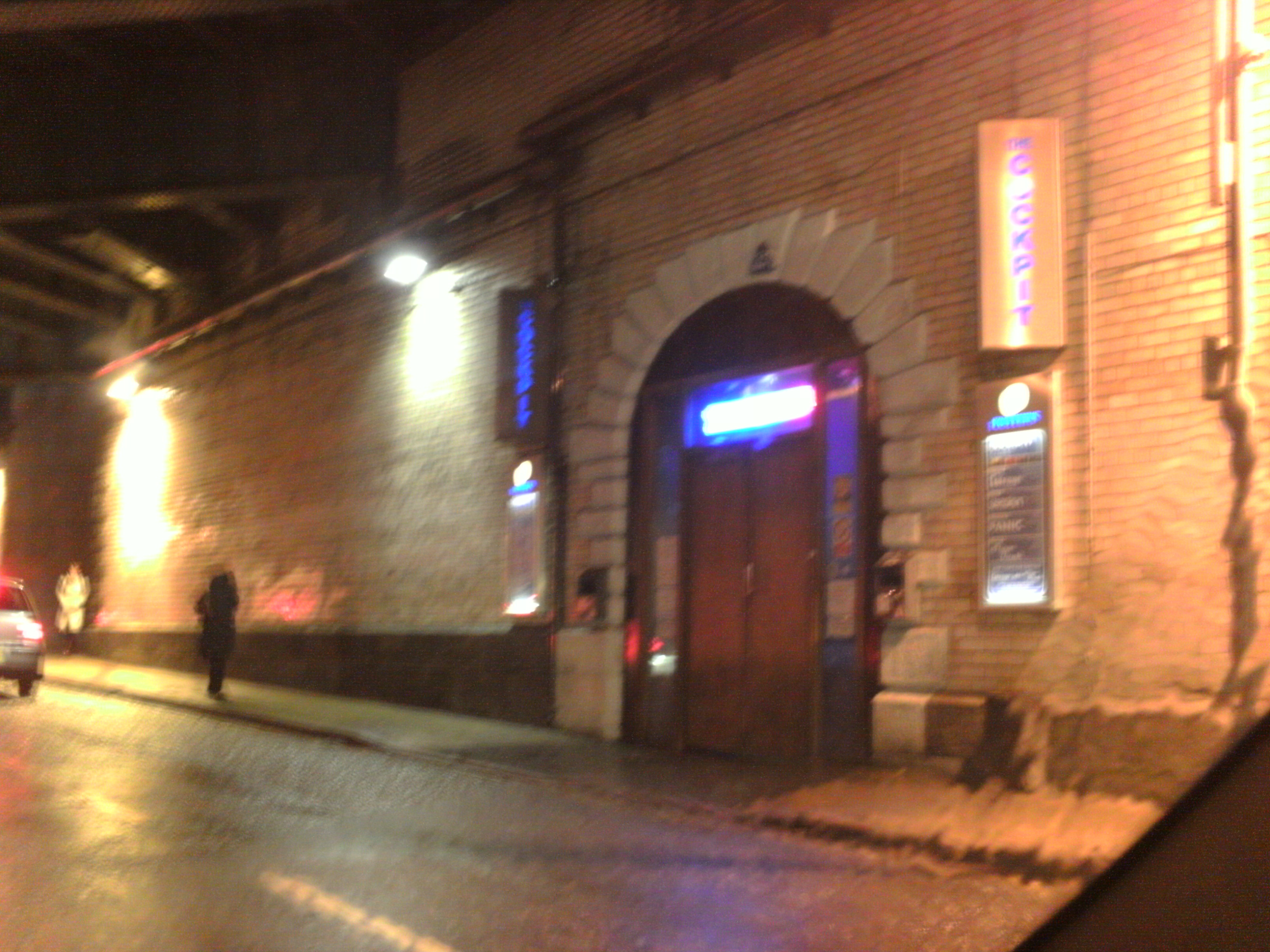
- The Cockpit entrance from Swinegate
- Location: Swinegate, Leeds, England
- Coordinates: 53°47′41″N 01°32′40″W
- Owner: Futuresound
- Capacity: 500 (main room), 250 (second room), 125 (third room)
- Opened: c. 1994
- Closed: 2014

Website
- www.thecockpit.co.uk [no longer active]

The Cockpit was a club and music venue in Leeds, West Yorkshire, England. Formerly the Cock of the North pub, the venue was located on Swinegate, close to Leeds station. It hosted small to medium-sized touring artists as well as occasional showcases for local acts. The venue's main room held 500, whilst the second room held 250, and the small upstairs room held 125.

== History ==
A regular competition run by promoters Futuresound (and sharing their name) gave unsigned bands from Yorkshire the chance to win a spot on the bill at the Leeds Festival.

The Cockpit was split into three live gig rooms with individual stages in each: The Cockpit (The Pit), Cockpit 2 (The Venue) and Cockpit 3 (The Upstairs). The venue had the ability to host 2 gigs on the same night, with a band in the main room using the second room as a bar, and a band in the upstairs using the main bar.

The venue played host to a variety of bands playing a wide range of musical styles including rock, metal, hardcore, emo, punk, indie, alternative and folk. Four weekly club nights ran at the Cockpit - Slam Dunk on a Tuesday, Southern Fried on a Wednesday, Heavy Soul on a Friday and Garage on a Saturday. Gay night Poptastic ran at the Cockpit on Thursday nights from the late 90s to early 2000s.

In November 1997 the club was one of three venues spotlighted in the Club City documentary about Leeds nightlife, screened as part of the BBC North Close Up North strand.

Nick Hodgson introduced Ricky Wilson to the other members of the Kaiser Chiefs at the Cockpit in the mid-nineties, when they attended Brighton Beach, the club's then weekly indie night. The group formed Runston Parva, later shortened to Parva, before changing their name to the Kaiser Chiefs in 2004.

== Closure ==
On 10 September 2014 the Cockpit's owners, promoters Futuresound, announced that they were to close the venue after 20 years due to the dwindling number of people prepared to go to club nights during the week and the poor condition of the building. As a "direct result" of the Cockpit closing, Futuresound's sister company Slam Dunk opened a new venue, the Key Club, in the Merrion Centre. Slam Dunk director Ben Ray has described the new venue as the first "pure rock" venue in Leeds. The Garage and Slam Dunk club nights, which were previously held at the Cockpit, along with several rock gigs which had been booked for the Cockpit, moved to the Key Club on its opening.
