= Destabilise =

Single by Enter Shikari
- Released: 26 October 2010
- Recorded: 2010
- Genre: Post-hardcore; electronic
- Length: 4:31
- Label: Ambush Reality
- Songwriter(s): Chris Batten, Rou Reynolds, Rob Rolfe, Rory Clewlow
- Producer(s): Dan Weller

Enter Shikari singles chronology
"Thumper" (2010)	"Destabilise" (2010)	"Quelle Surprise" (2011)

"Destabilise" is a single by British rock band Enter Shikari, released as an iTunes exclusive download on 26 October 2010 and as a limited coloured 7" vinyl on 29 November 2010 in the UK and Europe. The track was recorded in the summer of 2010 to be released as a "one off single". After recording the track, the band went on to numerous tours including Warped Tour and a tour of Australia. After Warped Tour, the band recorded the music video for the track before their Australian tour. The band performed the track at multiple festivals and UK Shows including the Reading and Leeds Festivals and at their Preston show, both of which they posted on their YouTube channel. On 21 October 2010 the band announced the release date for the single on their website and that there would be a limited 7" Vinyl featuring the track and live favourite Motherstep/Mothership recorded at the Hammersmith Apollo in February. Only 500 were manufactured, approx 350 were sold into UK indie record stores and the remainder held back for the launch of the band's new webstore a few days after release. Motherstep/Mothership was released in the United States as a standalone single on 17 December 2010.

The song was eventually included on the band's third studio album A Flash Flood of Colour as a bonus track on the UK and Ireland iTunes digital edition and on the Japanese CD version of the album, as well as the Redux version of the album.

== Track listing ==
=== Digital single/Limited coloured 7" vinyl ===
No.	Title	Length
1.	"Destabilise"	4:31
2.	"Motherstep/Mothership" (Live at Hammersmith Apollo 2010)	6:22

== Personnel ==
Enter Shikari

- Roughton "Rou" Reynolds – vocals, electronics
- Liam "Rory" Clewlow – guitar, vocals
- Chris Batten – bass, vocals
- Rob Rolfe – drums, background vocals

Production

- Dan Weller – production, mixing

== Charts ==
On 6 November 2010, "Destabilise" debuted at number 63 on the UK Singles Chart and at number 1 on the UK Rock Chart. The song stayed on the chart for eight consecutive weeks before falling off.

Chart (2010)	Peak position
UK Singles Chart	63
UK Rock Chart	1

== Release history ==
Region	Date	Label	Format
United Kingdom	26 October 2010	Ambush Reality	Digital download
United States	2 November 2010	DGC Records	Digital download
United Kingdom	29 November 2010	PIAS Recordings	7" vinyl
