= Gandhi Mate, Gandhi =

Single by Enter Shikari

from the album A Flash Flood of Colour
- Released: 6 December 2011
- Recorded: May–June 2011
- Genre: Post-hardcore; rap rock; dubstep
- Length: 4:26
- Label: Ambush Reality
- Songwriters: Chris Batten; Rou Reynolds; Rob Rolfe; Rory Clewlow

Enter Shikari singles chronology
"Sssnakepit" (2011)	"Gandhi Mate, Gandhi" (2011)	"Arguing with Thermometers" (2012)

"Gandhi Mate, Gandhi" is a single by British rock band Enter Shikari from their third studio album "A Flash Flood of Colour". The single was released on 6 December 2011 as a digital download. The song charted at number 112 in the UK Singles Chart and number 3 on the UK Rock Chart.

== Track listings ==
Digital download

1. "Gandhi Mate, Gandhi" – 4:26

== Chart performance ==
Chart (2011)	Peak position
UK Indie (Official Charts)	10
UK Singles Chart (Official Charts)	112
UK Rock Chart (Official Charts)	3

== Release history ==
Region	Date	Format	Label
Europe	2 December 2011	Digital download	Ambush Reality
United States	6 December 2011	Digital download	Hopeless Records
