= The Paddington Frisk =

Single by Enter Shikari

from the album Rat Race EP
- Released: 4 April 2013
- Recorded: February 2013
- Genre: Electronicore, hardcore punk, post-hardcore
- Length: 1:17
- Label: Ambush Reality, Hopeless Records
- Songwriters: Chris Batten, Rou Reynolds, Rob Rolfe, Rory Clewlow
- Producers: Enter Shikari, Dan Weller

Enter Shikari singles chronology
"Warm Smiles Do Not Make You Welcome Here" (2012)	"The Paddington Frisk" (2013)	"Radiate" (2013)

"The Paddington Frisk" is a single by British rock band Enter Shikari. The music video was released on their YouTube channel on 4 April 2013 and the single was released the same day. The single peaked at No. 18 on the UK Indie Singles Chart on 13 April 2013.

== Music video ==
The music video was filmed in London by Kode Media under the direction of Jamie Korn and released on 5 April 2013. The video showcases the band on a Japanese game show where a girl gives a man in a crocodile suit a noose and the band performs a choreographed dance miming hanging themselves. At the end of the video, the camera pans out to show the band in a board meeting presenting the video to an executive, who has a shocked expression on his face, with the band smiling.

== Track listing ==
Digital single

No.	Title	Length
1.	"The Paddington Frisk"	1:17

Shikari Sound System single

No.	Title	Length
1.	"The Paddington Frisk" (Shikari Sound System Remix)	2:11
2.	"The Paddington Dub" (Shikari Sound System Remix - Version)	5:09

== Band members ==
- Roughton "Rou" Reynolds – lead vocals, synthesizer, keyboards, programming
- Chris Batten – bass guitar, backing vocals
- Liam "Rory" Clewlow – guitar, backing vocals
- Rob Rolfe – drums, percussion, backing vocals
