= Quelle Surprise =

Single by Enter Shikari
- Released: 19 May 2011
- Recorded: 2011
- Genre: Post-hardcore; heavy metal; metalcore; grime
- Length: 4:35
- Label: Ambush Reality
- Songwriter: Enter Shikari
- Producer: Dan Weller

Enter Shikari singles chronology
"Destabilise" (2010)	"Quelle Surprise" (2011)	"Sssnakepit" (2011)

"Quelle Surprise" is a single by British rock band Enter Shikari, released on 19 May 2011. It was originally planned to be the first single released from the band's third studio album A Flash Flood of Colour. However, Rou Reynolds later confirmed that it would not feature, and instead will be a stand-alone single much like the previous single "Destabilise". The song was first played live at the SXSW Festival on 18 March 2011 in Austin, Texas. The track's debut airing was on 19 May 2011 Zane Lowe's BBC Radio 1 show, he chose the track for the "Hottest Record In the World" spot.

The single was released on iTunes shortly after being played on Zane's show. The single comes with 3 b-sides, 2 of them being remixes of "Destabilise", one by Reynolds' side project ROUT and the other by London artists Creatures of Love. The other b-side being a live recording of "Hectic" from the Enter Shikari Christmas party featuring Matty P. It was announced that on 11 July 2011 that this EP would be released as a limited edition 2 7" vinyl set (one will be red, the other will be white).

The song was eventually included on A Flash Flood of Colour as a bonus track on the iTunes version of the album in the UK and Ireland. The same edition of the album also included the previous standalone single "Destabilise" as a bonus track, as well.

== Track listing ==
All tracks are written by Enter Shikari.

No.	Title	Length
1.	"Quelle Surprise" (Clean)	4:35
2.	"Quelle Surprise"	4:35
3.	"Hectic" (Live) (feat. Matty P.)	4:31
4.	"Destabilise" (Rout Remix)	5:15
5.	"Destabilise" (Creatures of Love Remix)	3:56
6.	"Destabilise" (Jonny & The Snipers Version)	4:03

== Personnel ==
Enter Shikari

- Rou Reynolds - vocals, electronics
- Rory Clewlow - guitar, background vocals
- Chris Batten - bass, background vocals
- Rob Rolfe - drums, background vocals

Production

- Dan Weller - production, mixing

== Charts ==
Chart (2011)	Peak position
UK Singles Chart (Official Charts)	113
UK Rock Chart (Official Charts)	5
UK Indie (Official Charts)	15
