= Arguing with Thermometers =

Single by Enter Shikari

from the album A Flash Flood of Colour
- Released: 9 January 2012
- Recorded: May–June 2011
- Genre: Industrial; dubstep; punk rock
- Length: 3:24
- Label: Ambush Reality
- Songwriters: Chris Batten, Rou Reynolds, Rob Rolfe, Rory Clewlow
- Producers: Enter Shikari, Dan Weller

Enter Shikari singles chronology
"Gandhi Mate, Gandhi" (2011)	"Arguing with Thermometers" (2012)	"Warm Smiles Do Not Make You Welcome Here" (2012)

"Arguing with Thermometers" is a single by British rock band Enter Shikari from their 2012 album A Flash Flood of Colour. The song was included on a 5-track EP released via iTunes, along with a music video and remixes.

== Music video ==
The music video stars the members of the band working in a newsroom; Reynolds is the newsreader, Rolfe the weatherman and Clewlow and Batten operate cameras. The band leave the studio and then are seen performing outside by a road and interviewing businessmen on the street. The video was released on the band's official YouTube page on 14 January 2012. The video was directed and edited by Raul Gonzo.

== Track listing ==
No.	Title	Length
1.	"Arguing with Thermometers" (Calvertron Remix)	4:01
2.	"Arguing with Thermometers" (Taz Buckfaster Remix)	4:49
3.	"Arguing with Thermometers" (Goth-Trad Remix)	5:04
4.	"Arguing with Thermometers"	3:24

== Band members ==
- Roughton "Rou" Reynolds – lead vocals, synthesizer, keyboards, programming
- Chris Batten – bass guitar, backing vocals
- Liam "Rory" Clewlow – guitar, backing vocals
- Rob Rolfe – drums, percussion, backing vocals
