= Sssnakepit =

Single by Enter Shikari

from the album A Flash Flood of Colour
- Released: 20 September 2011
- Recorded: May–June 2011
- Genre: Alternative metal; drum and bass
- Length: 3:26
- Label: Ambush Reality, Hopeless Records
- Songwriters: Chris Batten, Rou Reynolds, Rob Rolfe, Rory Clewlow
- Producers: Enter Shikari, Dan Weller

Enter Shikari singles chronology
"Quelle Surprise" (2011)	"Sssnakepit" (2011)	"Gandhi Mate, Gandhi" (2011)

"Sssnakepit" is a single by English rock band Enter Shikari, the first from their third studio album "A Flash Flood of Colour". The single was released on 20 September 2011 as a digital download. The song charted at number 62 in the UK Singles Chart, number 11 on the UK Indie Chart and number 1 on the UK Rock Chart.

== Music video ==
A music video (produced and directed by Kode Media) to accompany the release of "Sssnakepit" was first released onto YouTube on 14 September 2011, at a total length of three minutes.

== Track listings ==
Digital download; UK promotional CD
No.	Title	Length
1.	"Sssnakepit"	3:28

iTunes Remix EP
No.	Title	Length
1.	"Sssnakepit"	3:28
2.	"Sssnakepit" (Rout remix)	4:31
3.	"Sssnakepit" (Hamilton remix)	4:51
4.	"Sssnakepit" (Serial Killaz remix)	5:30

7" Vinyl Remix single
No.	Title	Length
1.	"Sssnakepit" (Rout remix)	4:31
2.	"Quelle Surprise" (Rout VIP mix)	5:19

== Chart performance ==
Chart (2011)	Peak position
UK Indie (Official Charts)	11
UK Singles (Official Charts)	62
UK Rock Chart (Official Charts Company)	1

== Release history ==
Region	Date	Format	Label
United Kingdom	20 September 2011	Digital download	Ambush Reality
