= Juggernauts (song) =

Single by Enter Shikari

from the album Common Dreads
- B-side: "All Eyes on the Saint"
- Released: 29 May 2009
- Recorded: September 2008–February 2009 at Arreton Manor, UK
- Genre: Electronicore, alternative rock
- Label: Ambush Reality
- Songwriters: Chris Batten, Rou Reynolds, Rob Rolfe, Rory Clewlow
- Producers: Enter Shikari; Andy Gray

Enter Shikari singles chronology
"We Can Breathe in Space, They Just Don't Want Us to Escape" (2008)	"Juggernauts" (2009)	"No Sleep Tonight" (2009)

"Juggernauts" is a song by British rock band Enter Shikari produced by record producer Andy Gray for their second studio album, Common Dreads. The song was released as a single on 29 May 2009. The song was also released on 7" limited edition vinyl, of which only 1000 copies were made. "Juggernauts" was first broadcast to the public on Zane Lowe's show on BBC Radio 1 on 15 April 2009. It was selected by Scott Mills as his record of the week on 1 June 2009.

== Background and writing ==
The song was produced by Andy Gray and combined elements of different styles of music. Gray's list of writing credits includes penning songs for artists as diverse as Korn, Tori Amos and U2 and this is a reason for the variety of musical styles featured. The song was recorded at Arreton Manor in the Isle of Wight.

Some critics have drawn comparisons between singer Rou Reynolds "Mockney spoken words" in the middle of the song and the style of Mike Skinner (a.k.a. The Streets). According to Radio 1's Fraser McAlpine, "[Juggernauts] is full of sudden surges, short explosive passages and long, meandering lulls...there are spoken parts sounding a lot like Mike Skinner of The Streets". dailymusicguide wrote "you wouldn't be mistaken in thinking the song sounds like Mike Skinner from The Streets gone psychotic".

== Music video ==
The music video features shots of the band performing in a desert (filmed on location in Surrey) and shots of the band tied to wooden poles in a desert. The band are seen struggling to escape from the poles until eventually breaking free at the end of the video. The video was first seen on YouTube from Enter Shikari official channel.

The making of the music video can currently been seen on NME.com.

== Track listing ==
CD

No.	Title	Length
1.	"Juggernauts"	4:47
2.	"All Eyes on the Saint"	5:52
3.	"Juggernauts" (Nero Remix)	5:03
4.	"Juggernauts" (Blue Bear's True Tiger Remix Edit)	3:35

Digital download (first version)

No.	Title	Length
1.	"Juggernauts"	4:47
2.	"Juggernauts" (Blue Bear's True Tiger Remix Edit)	3:35

Digital download (second version)

No.	Title	Length
1.	"Juggernauts" (Nero Remix)	5:03
2.	"All Eyes on the Saint"	5:52

Beige vinyl

No.	Title	Length
1.	"Juggernauts"	4:47
2.	"All Eyes on the Saint"	5:52

Black vinyl

No.	Title	Length
1.	"Juggernauts" (Nero Remix Edit)	3:27
2.	"Juggernauts" (Blue Bear's True Tiger Remix Edit)	3:35

== Reception ==
The song was met with mixed reviews from contemporary music, with the most common criticism being the shift away from the usual style of the band. ilikemusic.com wrote a positive review, stating "This is the sound of Enter Shikari matured focused and at the peak of their powers" and went on to say that the band were "brave enough to stand on their own and away from the pack". dailymusicguide gave the song a 4/5 rating and described it as a "departure [from the usual style] in a good way". They commented that it was "screechy and loud" and "Its rave-like synth-electro noise and screaming lyrics is like nothing you've heard on commercial radio before." Click Music's Dom Smith wrote "this tune is best described as a controlled frenzy" but "Juggernauts is a top tune and it shows that the group have really progressed since their debut, not only musically but thematically."

== Charts ==
Chart (2009)	Peak position
UK Singles Chart	28
