= List of UK Country Albums Chart number ones of 2017 =

These are the Official Charts Company's UK Country Albums Chart number ones of 2017. The chart week runs from Friday to Thursday with the chart-date given as the following Thursday. Chart positions are based the multi-metric consumption of country music in the United Kingdom, blending traditional album sales, track equivalent albums, and streaming equivalent albums. The chart contains 20 positions.

In the iteration of the chart dated 6 January, Ward Thomas' second album Cartwheels spent its sixth week at number one, having spent the last two weeks of 2016 in the top spot. The British duo spent the first five weeks of the year at the chart peak, and returned for a further two weeks in mid-February. Beginning on 10 March, Alison Krauss spent seven consecutive weeks at number one with her album Windy City before being displaced by Brad Paisley's Love and War, which spent two weeks in the top spot. Following this, Chris Stapleton charted at number one with From A Room: Volume 1, and charted again later in the year with Volume 2, spending a total of five weeks at number one. Glen Campbell's final studio album Adiós debuted at number one, and remained there for twenty-one weeks, with sales likely being boosted following his death on 8 August. The album was displaced by Margo Price's All American Made, but returned to the peak for the last two weeks of the year. Other artists who spent multiple weeks at number one included Shane Richie, and Zac Brown Band.

== Chart history ==
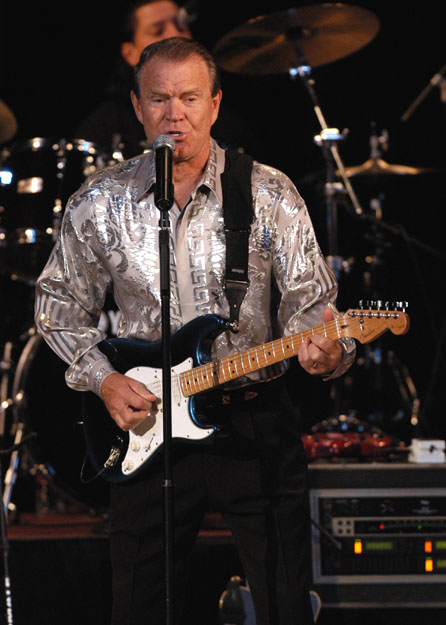
Glen Campbell spent twenty-three weeks at number one with his final album Adiós.

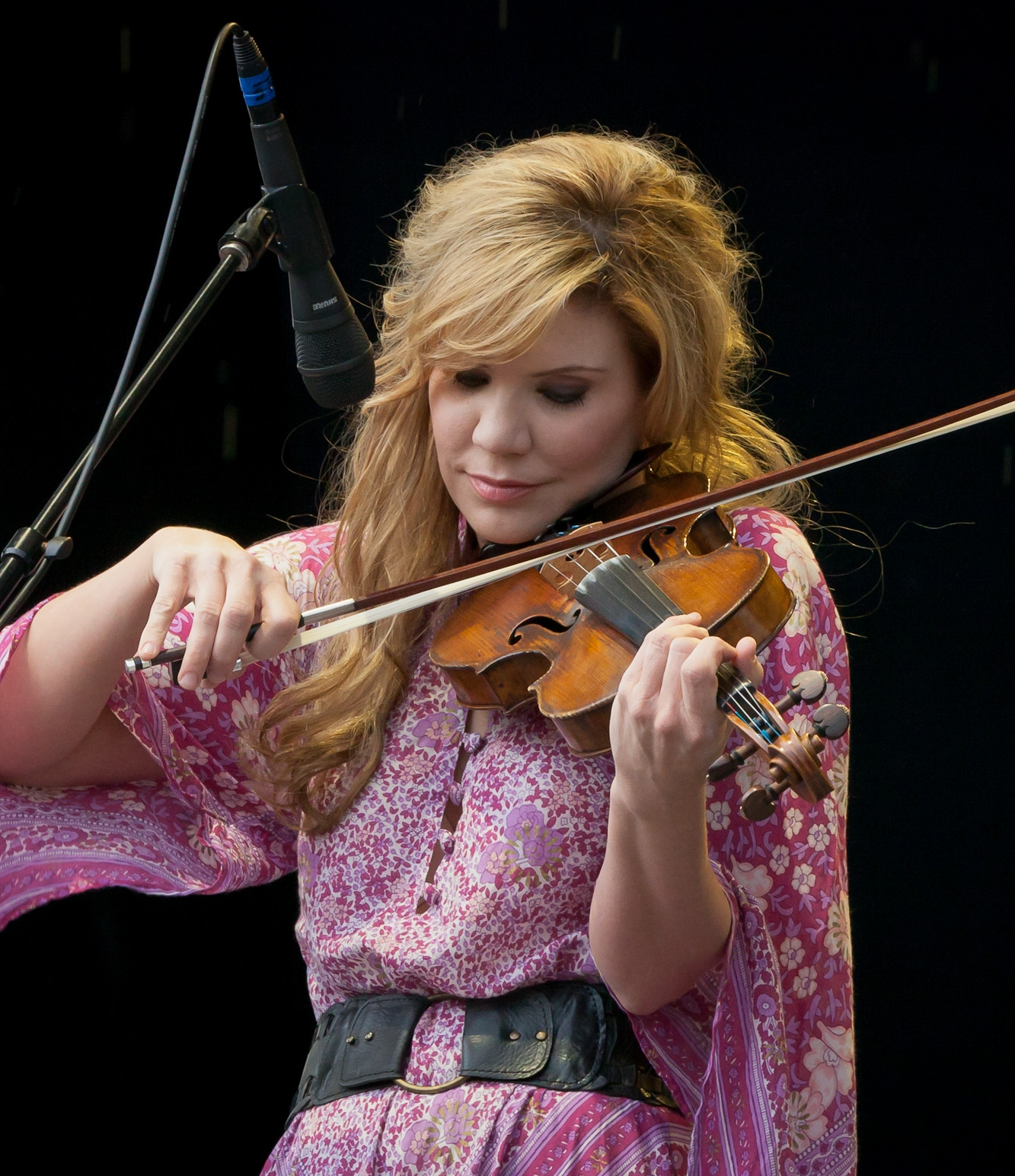
Windy City by Alison Krauss spent seven consecutive weeks at the chart peak.

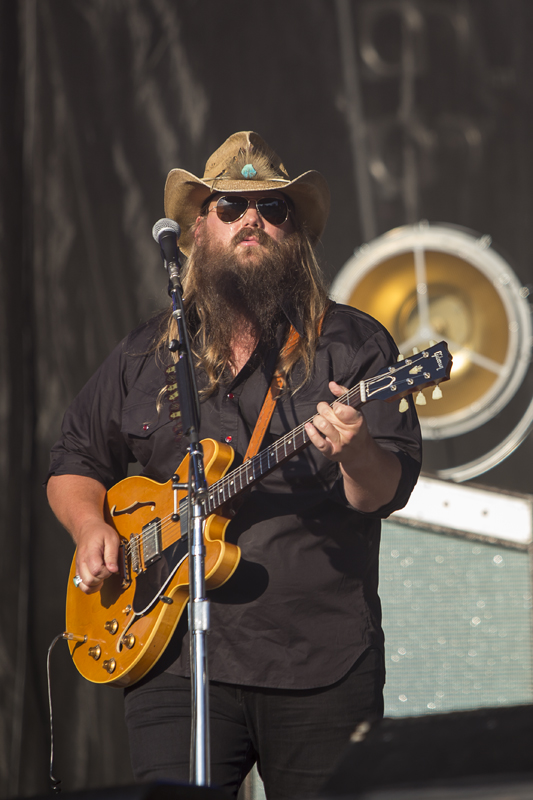
Chris Stapleton spent a total of five weeks at number one throughout the year with his two part project From A Room: Volume 1 and Volume 2.

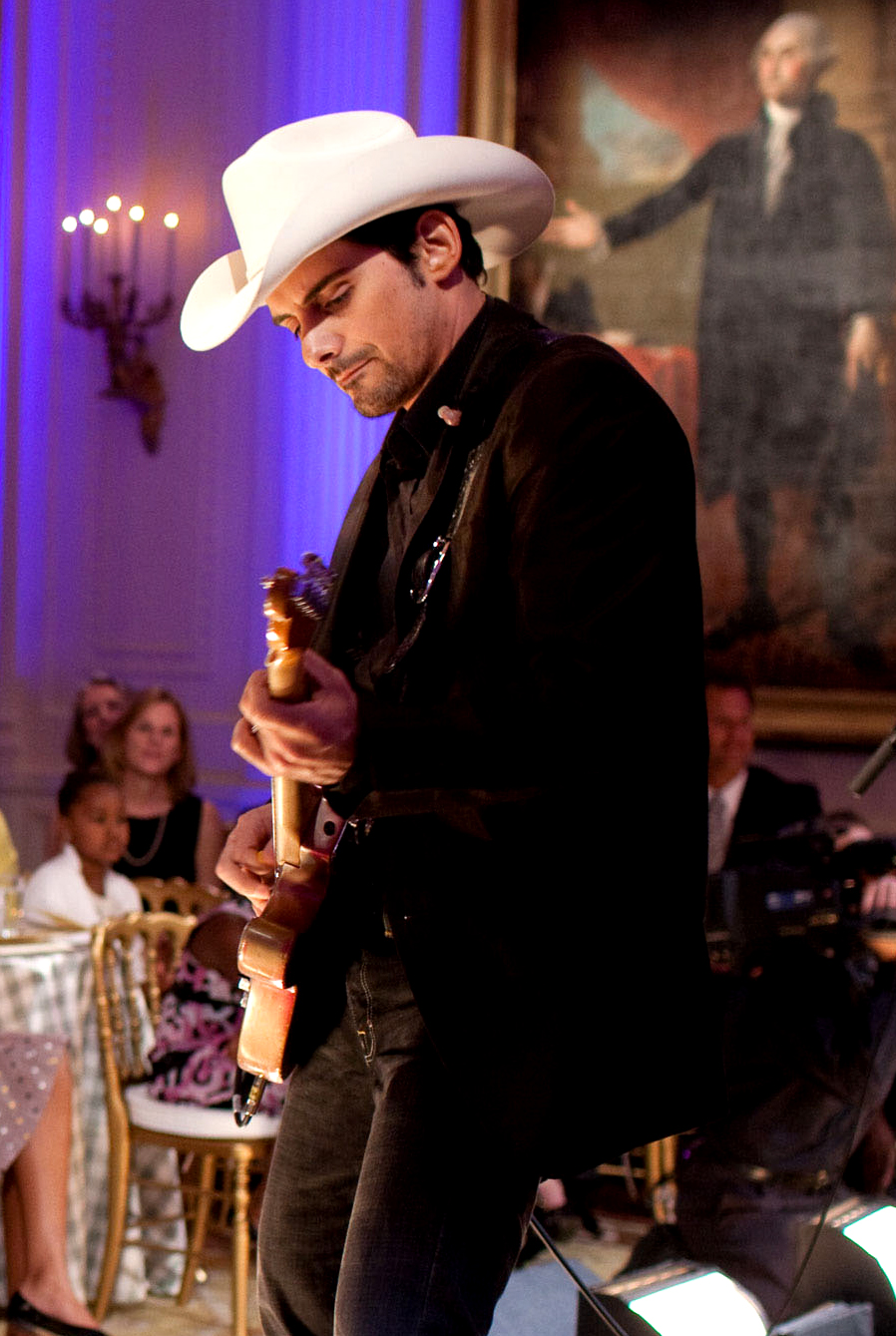
Love and War by Brad Paisley held the top spot for two weeks, and became his third studio album to reach the peak in the UK.

Issue date	Album	Artist(s)	Record label	Ref.
6 January	Cartwheels	Ward Thomas	Sony/WTW	
13 January	Cartwheels	Ward Thomas	Sony/WTW	
20 January	Cartwheels	Ward Thomas	Sony/WTW	
27 January	Cartwheels	Ward Thomas	Sony/WTW	
3 February	Cartwheels	Ward Thomas	Sony/WTW	
10 February	Liv On	Amy Sky, Olivia Newton-John, and Beth Nielsen Chapman	OBA	
17 February	Cartwheels	Ward Thomas	Sony/WTW	
24 February	Cartwheels	Ward Thomas	Sony/WTW	
3 March	The Breaker	Little Big Town	Capitol	
10 March	Windy City	Alison Krauss	Capitol	
17 March	Windy City	Alison Krauss	Capitol	
24 March	Windy City	Alison Krauss	Capitol	
31 March	Windy City	Alison Krauss	Capitol	
7 April	Windy City	Alison Krauss	Capitol	
14 April	Windy City	Alison Krauss	Capitol	
21 April	Windy City	Alison Krauss	Capitol	
28 April	Love and War	Brad Paisley	Arista Nashville	
5 May	Love and War	Brad Paisley	Arista Nashville	
12 May	From A Room: Volume 1	Chris Stapleton	Mercury Nashville	
19 May	From A Room: Volume 1	Chris Stapleton	Mercury Nashville	
26 May	Welcome Home	Zac Brown Band	Atlantic	
9 June	Welcome Home	Zac Brown Band	Atlantic	
9 June	From A Room: Volume 1	Chris Stapleton	Mercury Nashville	
16 June	Adiós	Glen Campbell	UMC	
23 June	Adiós	Glen Campbell	UMC	
30 June	Adiós	Glen Campbell	UMC	
7 July	Adiós	Glen Campbell	UMC	
14 July	Adiós	Glen Campbell	UMC	
21 July	Adiós	Glen Campbell	UMC	
28 July	Adiós	Glen Campbell	UMC	
4 August	Adiós	Glen Campbell	UMC	
11 August	Adiós	Glen Campbell	UMC	
18 August	Adiós	Glen Campbell	UMC	
25 August	Adiós	Glen Campbell	UMC	
1 September	Adiós	Glen Campbell	UMC	
8 September	Adiós	Glen Campbell	UMC	
15 September	Adiós	Glen Campbell	UMC	
22 September	Adiós	Glen Campbell	UMC	
29 September	Adiós	Glen Campbell	UMC	
6 October	Adiós	Glen Campbell	UMC	
13 October	Adiós	Glen Campbell	UMC	
20 October	Adiós	Glen Campbell	UMC	
27 October	Adiós	Glen Campbell	UMC	
3 November	Adiós	Glen Campbell	UMC	
10 November	All American Made	Margo Price	Third Man	
17 November	A Country Soul	Shane Richie	Rhino	
1 December	A Country Soul	Shane Richie	Rhino	
8 December	From A Room: Volume 2	Chris Stapleton	Mercury Nashville	
15 December	From A Room: Volume 2	Chris Stapleton	Mercury Nashville	
22 December	Adiós	Glen Campbell	UMC	
29 December	Adiós	Glen Campbell	UMC	

== Most weeks at number one ==
Weeks at number one	Artist
23	Glen Campbell
7	Alison Krauss
7	Ward Thomas
5	Chris Stapleton
2	Brad Paisley
2	Shane Richie
2	Zac Brown Band

== See also ==
- List of UK Albums Chart number ones of 2017
- List of UK Dance Singles Chart number ones of 2017
- List of UK Album Downloads Chart number ones of 2017
- List of UK Independent Albums Chart number ones of 2017
- List of UK R&B Albums Chart number ones of 2017
- List of UK Rock & Metal Albums Chart number ones of 2017
- List of UK Compilation Chart number ones of the 2010s
