= List of UK Dance Albums Chart number ones of 2017 =

These are the Official Charts Company's UK Dance Albums Chart number ones of 2017. The chart week runs from Friday to Thursday with the chart-date given as the following Thursday.

== Chart history ==
Issue date	Album	Artist(s)	Record label	Ref.
5 January	I Love 90's	Various Artists	Ministry of Sound	
12 January	Classic House	Pete Tong, The Heritage Orchestra & Jules Buckley	U.M.C.	
19 January	Classic House	Pete Tong, The Heritage Orchestra & Jules Buckley	U.M.C.	
26 January	Migration	Bonobo	Ninja Tune	
2 February	Classic House	Pete Tong, The Heritage Orchestra & Jules Buckley	U.M.C.	
9 February	Classic House	Pete Tong, The Heritage Orchestra & Jules Buckley	U.M.C.	
16 February	I Love Trance	Various Artists	Ministry of Sound	
23 February	I Love Trance	Various Artists	Ministry of Sound	
2 March	I Love Trance	Various Artists	Ministry of Sound	
9 March	I Love Trance	Various Artists	Ministry of Sound	
16 March	Power House	Various Artists	AATW/UMOD	
23 March	Sleepin Is Cheatin	Various Artists	Ministry of Sound	
30 March	Sleepin Is Cheatin	Various Artists	Ministry of Sound	
6 April	Sleepin Is Cheatin	Various Artists	Ministry of Sound	
13 April	Pure Bassline - Mixed By DJ Q & Jamie	Various Artists	New State	
20 April	Memories...Do Not Open	The Chainsmokers	Disruptor Records	
27 April	For the Love of Rave	Various Artists	UMOD	
4 May	Hypnotic	Wilkinson	Ram/Virgin	
11 May	Club Classics	Various Artists	Ministry of Sound	
18 May	Club Classics	Various Artists	Ministry of Sound	
25 May	100% Clubland Hardcore	Various Artists	AATW/UMOD	
1 June	100% Clubland Hardcore	Various Artists	AATW/UMOD	
8 June	House Heads	Various Artists	Ministry of Sound	
15 June	Generations - Three Decades of Dance	Various Artists	New State	
22 June	Glitterbox - A Disco Hi	Various Artists	Defected	
29 June	Marbella Collection 2017	Various Artists	Ministry of Sound	
6 July	Marbella Collection 2017	Various Artists	Ministry of Sound	
13 July	Marbella Collection 2017	Various Artists	Ministry of Sound	
20 July	Big Tunes	Various Artists	Ministry of Sound	
27 July	Jonas Blue - Electronic Nature - The Mix	Various Artists	UMOD	
3 August	Chilled House Ibiza 2017	Various Artists	Ministry of Sound	
10 August	Sunset Chilled	Various Artists	Ministry of Sound	
17 August	Sunset Chilled	Various Artists	Ministry of Sound	
24 August	MTV Base - Garage Anthems	Various Artists	UMOD	
31 August	Piano House Classics	Various Artists	Ministry of Sound	
7 September	Piano House Classics	Various Artists	Ministry of Sound	
14 September	Piano House Classics	Various Artists	Ministry of Sound	
21 September	Piano House Classics	Various Artists	Ministry of Sound	
28 September	Euphoria Classics	Various Artists	Ministry of Sound	
5 October	Euphoria Classics	Various Artists	Ministry of Sound	
12 October	New Energy	Four Tet	Text	
19 October	Old Skool Ravers	Various Artists	Ministry of Sound	
26 October	Old Skool Ravers	Various Artists	Ministry of Sound	
2 November	Old Skool Ravers	Various Artists	Ministry of Sound	
9 November	Anjunadeep 09	Various Artists	Anjunadeep	
16 November	The Annual 2018	Various Artists	Ministry of Sound	
23 November	The Annual 2018	Various Artists	Ministry of Sound	
30 November	The Annual 2018	Various Artists	Ministry of Sound	
7 December	Clubland 100% 90s	Various Artists	AATW/UMOD	
14 December	Ibiza Classics	Pete Tong, The Heritage Orchestra & Jules Buckley	U.M.C.	
21 December	Ibiza Classics	Pete Tong, The Heritage Orchestra & Jules Buckley	U.M.C.	
28 December	Ibiza Classics	Pete Tong, The Heritage Orchestra & Jules Buckley	U.M.C.	

== See also ==
- List of UK Albums Chart number ones of 2017
- List of UK Dance Singles Chart number ones of 2017
- List of UK Album Downloads Chart number ones of 2017
- List of UK Independent Albums Chart number ones of 2017
- List of UK R&B Albums Chart number ones of 2017
- List of UK Rock & Metal Albums Chart number ones of 2017
- List of UK Compilation Chart number ones of the 2010s
