= List of UK Independent Singles Chart number ones of 2017 =

These are the Official Charts Company's UK Independent Singles Chart number-one singles of 2017.

== Chart history ==
Chart date (week ending)	Song	Artist(s)	Record label	References
5 January	"Cold Water"	Major Lazer featuring Justin Bieber and MØ	Because Music	
12 January	"Cold Water"	Major Lazer featuring Justin Bieber and MØ	Because Music	
19 January	"Water Under the Bridge"	Adele	XL	
26 January	"On Hold"	The xx	Young Turks	
2 February	"Bad and Boujee"	Migos	Quality Control	
9 February	"Run Up"	Major Lazer featuring PartyNextDoor and Nicki Minaj	Because Music	
16 February	"Big for Your Boots"	Stormzy	Merky	
23 February	"Big for Your Boots"	Stormzy	Merky	
2 March	"Big for Your Boots"	Stormzy	Merky	
9 March ^{[b]}	"Big for Your Boots"	Stormzy	Merky	
16 March ^{[b]}	"Big for Your Boots"	Stormzy	Merky	
23 March	"Big for Your Boots"	Stormzy	Merky	
30 March	"Big for Your Boots"	Stormzy	Merky	
6 April	"Big for Your Boots"	Stormzy	Merky	
13 April	"Big for Your Boots"	Stormzy	Merky	
20 April	"Big for Your Boots"	Stormzy	Merky	
27 April	"Big for Your Boots"	Stormzy	Merky	
4 May	"Big for Your Boots"	Stormzy	Merky	
11 May	"Big for Your Boots"	Stormzy	Merky	
18 May	"Big for Your Boots"	Stormzy	Merky	
25 May	"Big for Your Boots"	Stormzy	Merky	
1 June	"P.Y.T. (Pretty Young Thing)"	John Gibbons	Good Soldier	
8 June	"Liar Liar GE2017"	Captain Ska	Captain's	
15 June	"Know No Better"	Major Lazer featuring Travis Scott and Camila Cabello	Because Music	
22 June	"Know No Better"	Major Lazer featuring Travis Scott and Camila Cabello	Because Music	
29 June	"Know No Better"	Major Lazer featuring Travis Scott and Camila Cabello	Because Music	
6 July	"Know No Better"	Major Lazer featuring Travis Scott and Camila Cabello	Because Music	
13 July	"Know No Better"	Major Lazer featuring Travis Scott and Camila Cabello	Because Music	
20 July	"Know No Better"	Major Lazer featuring Travis Scott and Camila Cabello	Because Music	
27 July	"Know No Better"	Major Lazer featuring Travis Scott and Camila Cabello	Because Music	
3 August	"Know No Better"	Major Lazer featuring Travis Scott and Camila Cabello	Because Music	
10 August	"Know No Better"	Major Lazer featuring Travis Scott and Camila Cabello	Because Music	
17 August	"Know No Better"	Major Lazer featuring Travis Scott and Camila Cabello	Because Music	
24 August	"Know No Better"	Major Lazer featuring Travis Scott and Camila Cabello	Because Music	
31 August	"Know No Better"	Major Lazer featuring Travis Scott and Camila Cabello	Because Music	
7 September	"Glorious"	Macklemore featuring Skylar Grey	Bendo	
14 September	"Glorious"	Macklemore featuring Skylar Grey	Bendo	
21 September	"Glorious"	Macklemore featuring Skylar Grey	Bendo	
28 September	"Glorious"	Macklemore featuring Skylar Grey	Bendo	
5 October	"Glorious"	Macklemore featuring Skylar Grey	Bendo	
12 October	"Glorious"	Macklemore featuring Skylar Grey	Bendo	
19 October	"Glorious"	Macklemore featuring Skylar Grey	Bendo	
26 October	"Glorious"	Macklemore featuring Skylar Grey	Bendo	
2 November	"Cola"	CamelPhat and Elderbrook	Defected	
9 November	"Cola"	CamelPhat and Elderbrook	Defected	
16 November	"No Words"	Dave	Dave	
23 November	"Blinded by Your Grace, Pt. 2"	Stormzy featuring MNEK	Merky	
30 November	"Blinded by Your Grace, Pt. 2"	Stormzy featuring MNEK	Merky	
7 December	"Blinded by Your Grace, Pt. 2"	Stormzy featuring MNEK	Merky	
14 December	"Blinded by Your Grace, Pt. 2"	Stormzy featuring MNEK	Merky	
21 December	"Blinded by Your Grace, Pt. 2"	Stormzy featuring MNEK	Merky	
28 December	"Blinded by Your Grace, Pt. 2"	Stormzy featuring MNEK	Merky	

== Notes ==
- ^{b} – The single was simultaneously number-one on the Independent Albums Chart.

== Number-one Indie artists ==
Position	Artist	Weeks at number one
1	Stormzy	21
2	Major Lazer	15
3	Macklemore	8
4	CamelPhat	2
5	Adele	1
5	Captain Ska	1
5	Dave	1
5	John Gibbons	1
5	Migos	1
5	The xx	1

== See also ==
- List of UK Dance Singles Chart number ones of 2017
- List of UK R&B Singles Chart number ones of 2017
- List of UK Rock & Metal Singles Chart number ones of 2017
- List of UK Independent Albums Chart number ones of 2017
