= List of UK Independent Albums Chart number ones of 2017 =

These are the Official Charts Company's UK Independent Albums Chart number ones of 2017.

== Chart history ==
Key
†	Best-selling indie album of the year

Issue date	Album	Artist(s)	Record label	Ref.
6 January	50	Rick Astley	BMG	
13 January	Night People	You Me at Six	Infectious	
20 January	I See You	The xx	Young Turks	
27 January	Modern Ruin	Frank Carter & the Rattlesnakes	International Death Cult	
3 February	All These Countless Nights	Deaf Havana	So Recordings	
10 February	Heavy Fire	Black Star Riders	Nuclear Blast	
17 February	Rip It Up	Thunder	earMUSIC	
24 February	25	Adele	XL	
3 March	Gang Signs & Prayer	Stormzy	Merky	
10 March	Gang Signs & Prayer	Stormzy	Merky	
17 March	Semper Femina	Laura Marling	More Alarming Records	
24 March	25	Adele	XL	
31 March	Damage and Joy	Jesus and Mary Chain	Artificial Plastic	
7 April	Silver Eye	Goldfrapp	Mute	
14 April	Infinite	Deep Purple	ear Music	
21 April	Infinite	Deep Purple	ear Music	
28 April	Tears on the Dancefloor	Steps	Steps Music	
4 May	Tears on the Dancefloor	Steps	Steps Music	
11 May	Pollinator	Blondie	BMG	
18 May	Tears on the Dancefloor	Steps	Steps Music	
25 May	World Be Gone	Erasure	Mute	
1 June	Different Days	The Charlatans	BMG	
8 June	Relaxer	Alt-J	Infectious	
15 June	Without a Word	Hank Marvin	DMG TV	
22 June	Feed the Machine	Nickelback	BMG	
29 June	OK Computer	Radiohead	XL	
6 July	OK Computer	Radiohead	XL	
13 July	Every Valley	Public Service Broadcasting	Play It Again Sam	
20 July	King of the North	Bugzy Malone	Ill Gotten	
27 July	Every Valley	Public Service Broadcasting	Play It Again Sam	
3 August	Paranormal	Alice Cooper	Ear Music	
10 August	Paranormal	Alice Cooper	Ear Music	
17 August	You	Dodie	Dodie	
24 August	The Peace and the Panic	Neck Deep	Hopeless	
31 August	Villains	Queens of the Stone Age	Matador	
7 September	The Punishment of Luxury	OMD	100%	
14 September	Sleep Well Beast	The National	4AD	
21 September	Savage (Songs from a Broken World)	Gary Numan	BMG	
28 September	The Spark	Enter Shikari	Play It Again Sam	
5 October	Visions of a Life	Wolf Alice	Dirty Hit	
12 October	Pinewood Smile	The Darkness	Cooking Vinyl	
19 October	Lotta Sea Lice	Courtney Barnett and Kurt Vile	Marathon Artists	
26 October	Adios Senor Pussycat	Michael Head & The Red Elastic Band	Violette	
2 November	Tears on the Dancefloor	Steps	Steps Music	
9 November	Tears on the Dancefloor	Steps	Steps Music	
16 November	Instant Pleasures	Shed Seven	Infectious	
23 November	Low in High School	Morrissey	BMG	
30 November	Who Built the Moon?	Noel Gallagher	Sour Mash	
7 December	Who Built the Moon?	Noel Gallagher	Sour Mash	
14 December	Who Built the Moon?	Noel Gallagher	Sour Mash	
21 December	Who Built the Moon?	Noel Gallagher	Sour Mash	
28 December	Who Built the Moon?	Noel Gallagher	Sour Mash	

== See also ==
- List of UK Rock & Metal Albums Chart number ones of 2017
- List of UK Albums Chart number ones of 2017
- List of UK Dance Albums Chart number ones of 2017
- List of UK Album Downloads Chart number ones of 2017
- List of UK R&B Albums Chart number ones of 2017
- List of UK Independent Singles Chart number ones of 2017
