= List of UK Dance Singles Chart number ones of 2017 =

The UK Dance Singles Chart is a weekly music chart compiled in the United Kingdom by the Official Charts Company (OCC) from sales of songs in the dance music genre (house, drum and bass, dubstep, etc.) in record stores and digital downloads. The chart week runs from Friday to Thursday with the chart-date given as the following Thursday.

This is a list of the songs which were number one on the UK Dance Singles Chart during 2017.

== Chart history ==
Key
| † | Best-performing dance single of the year |

| Chart date (week ending) | Song | Artist(s) | References |
|---|---|---|---|
| 5 January | "Closer" | The Chainsmokers featuring Halsey | |
| 12 January | "Closer" | The Chainsmokers featuring Halsey | |
| 19 January | "You Don't Know Me" | Jax Jones featuring Raye | |
| 26 January | "You Don't Know Me" | Jax Jones featuring Raye | |
| 2 February | "You Don't Know Me" | Jax Jones featuring Raye | |
| 9 February | "You Don't Know Me" | Jax Jones featuring Raye | |
| 16 February | "You Don't Know Me" | Jax Jones featuring Raye | |
| 23 February | "You Don't Know Me" | Jax Jones featuring Raye | |
| 2 March | "You Don't Know Me" | Jax Jones featuring Raye | |
| 9 March | "Something Just Like This" † | The Chainsmokers & Coldplay | |
| 16 March | "Something Just Like This" † | The Chainsmokers & Coldplay | |
| 23 March | "Something Just Like This" † | The Chainsmokers & Coldplay | |
| 30 March | "Something Just Like This" † | The Chainsmokers & Coldplay | |
| 6 April | "Something Just Like This" † | The Chainsmokers & Coldplay | |
| 13 April | "Something Just Like This" † | The Chainsmokers & Coldplay | |
| 20 April | "Something Just Like This" † | The Chainsmokers & Coldplay | |
| 27 April | "Something Just Like This" † | The Chainsmokers & Coldplay | |
| 4 May | "Solo Dance" | Martin Jensen | |
| 11 May | "Solo Dance" | Martin Jensen | |
| 18 May | "Solo Dance" | Martin Jensen | |
| 25 May | "Solo Dance" | Martin Jensen | |
| 1 June | "Mama" | Jonas Blue featuring William Singe | |
| 8 June | "Mama" | Jonas Blue featuring William Singe | |
| 15 June | "Mama" | Jonas Blue featuring William Singe | |
| 22 June | "2U" | David Guetta featuring Justin Bieber | |
| 29 June | "Mama" | Jonas Blue featuring William Singe | |
| 6 July | "Mama" | Jonas Blue featuring William Singe | |
| 13 July | "Mama" | Jonas Blue featuring William Singe | |
| 20 July | "Mama" | Jonas Blue featuring William Singe | |
| 27 July | "Mama" | Jonas Blue featuring William Singe | |
| 3 August | "Mama" | Jonas Blue featuring William Singe | |
| 10 August | "Mama" | Jonas Blue featuring William Singe | |
| 17 August | "Mama" | Jonas Blue featuring William Singe | |
| 24 August | "Mama" | Jonas Blue featuring William Singe | |
| 31 August | "Mama" | Jonas Blue featuring William Singe | |
| 7 September | "More Than Friends" | James Hype featuring Kelli-Leigh | |
| 14 September | "More Than Friends" | James Hype featuring Kelli-Leigh | |
| 21 September | "More Than Friends" | James Hype featuring Kelli-Leigh | |
| 28 September | "More Than Friends" | James Hype featuring Kelli-Leigh | |
| 5 October | "Lonely Together" | Avicii featuring Rita Ora | |
| 12 October | "Lonely Together" | Avicii featuring Rita Ora | |
| 19 October | "Lonely Together" | Avicii featuring Rita Ora | |
| 26 October | "Lonely Together" | Avicii featuring Rita Ora | |
| 2 November | "Silence" | Marshmello featuring Khalid | |
| 9 November | "Silence" | Marshmello featuring Khalid | |
| 16 November | "Silence" | Marshmello featuring Khalid | |
| 23 November | "Silence" | Marshmello featuring Khalid | |
| 30 November | "Silence" | Marshmello featuring Khalid | |
| 7 December | "Silence" | Marshmello featuring Khalid | |
| 14 December | "Silence" | Marshmello featuring Khalid | |
| 21 December | "Silence" | Marshmello featuring Khalid | |
| 28 December | "Silence" | Marshmello featuring Khalid | |

== Number-one artists ==
| Position | Artist | Weeks at number one |
|---|---|---|
| 1 | Jonas Blue | 13 |
| 2 | The Chainsmokers | 10 |
| 3 | Marshmello | 9 |
| 4 | Jax Jones | 7 |
| 5 | Martin Jensen | 4 |
| 5 | James Hype | 4 |
| 5 | Avicii | 4 |
| 6 | David Guetta | 1 |

== See also ==
- List of number-one singles of 2017 (UK)
- List of UK Dance Albums Chart number ones of 2017
- List of UK R&B Singles Chart number ones of 2017
- List of UK Rock & Metal Singles Chart number ones of 2017
- List of UK Independent Singles Chart number ones of 2017
