= List of UK Rock & Metal Singles Chart number ones of 2017 =

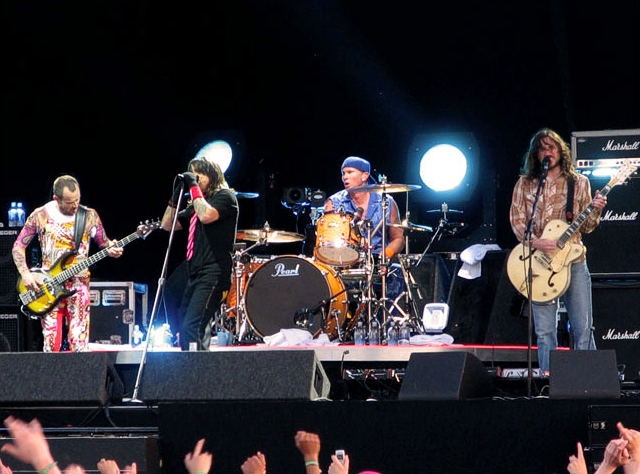
"Can't Stop" by Red Hot Chili Peppers was the longest-running number one single of 2016, spending 20 weeks atop the chart.

The UK Rock & Metal Singles Chart is a record chart which ranks the best-selling rock and heavy metal songs in the United Kingdom. Compiled and published by the Official Charts Company, the data is based on each single's weekly physical sales, digital downloads and streams. In 2017, there were 16 singles that topped the 52 published charts. The first number-one of the year was "Christmas Time (Don't Let the Bells End)" by The Darkness, which spent the last two weeks of 2016 and the first week of 2017 atop the chart. The final number-one single of the year was also "Christmas Time (Don't Let the Bells End)", which spent the last three weeks atop the chart.

The most successful single on the UK Rock & Metal Singles Chart in 2017 was "Can't Stop" by Red Hot Chili Peppers, which hs spent a total of 20 weeks at number one. Royal Blood have been number one for six weeks with two releases, Linkin Park were number one for five weeks with "Numb", Foo Fighters have spent five weeks at number one with "Run" and "The Sky Is a Neighborhood", The Darkness have spent four weeks at number one with "Christmas Time (Don't Let the Bells End)", Guns N' Roses have spent three weeks at number one with "Sweet Child o' Mine", and Thirty Seconds to Mars spent two weeks at number one with "Walk on Water".

== Chart history ==
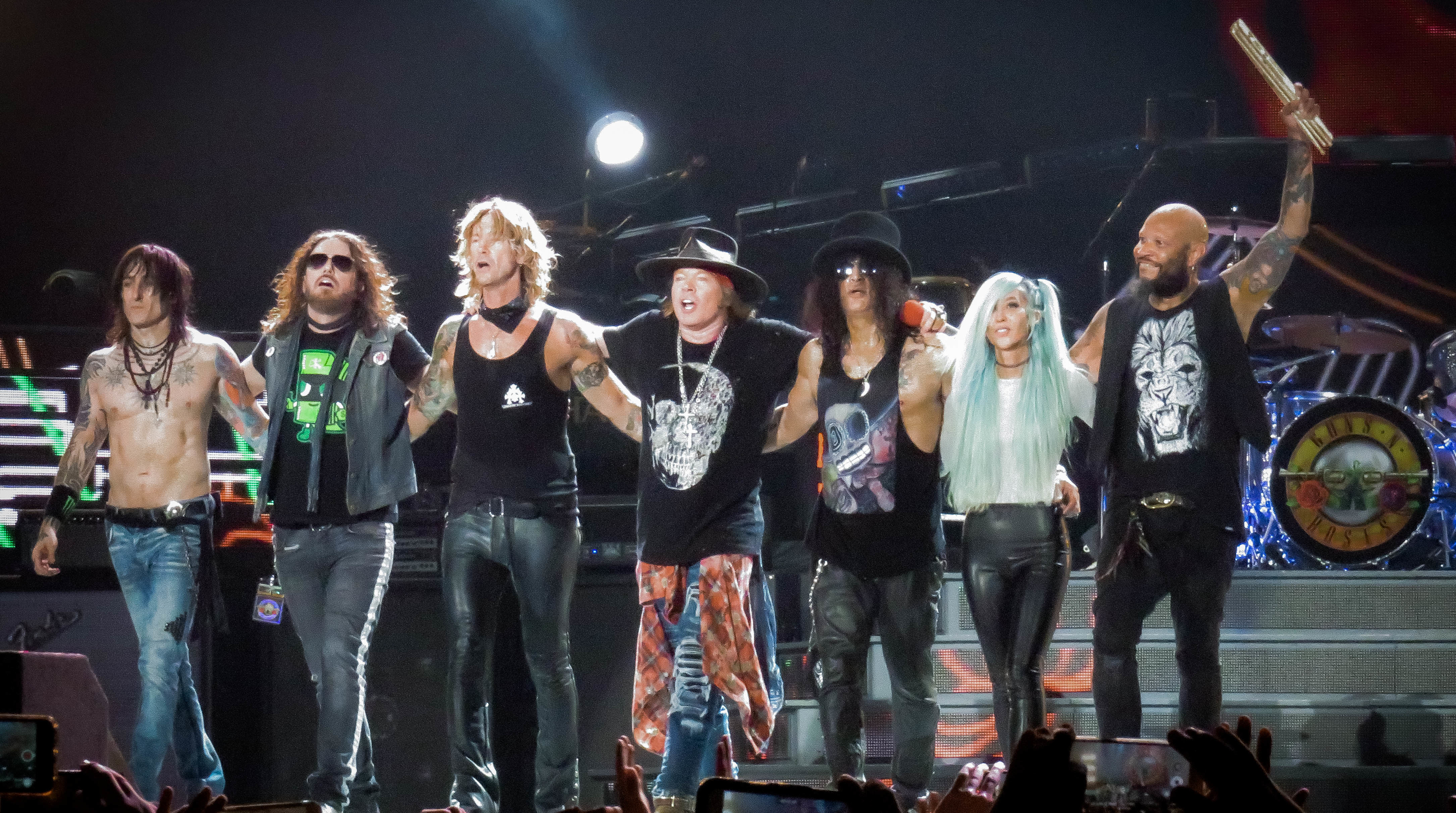
Guns N' Roses spent three weeks at number one with "Sweet Child o' Mine".

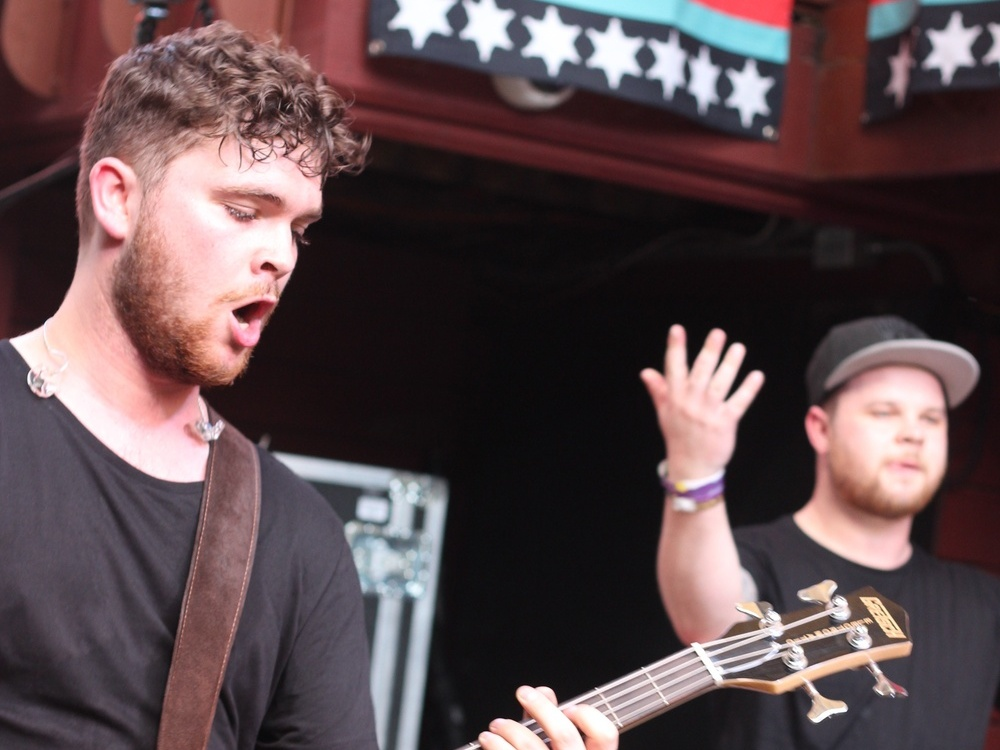
Two singles by Royal Blood have topped the chart in 2017.

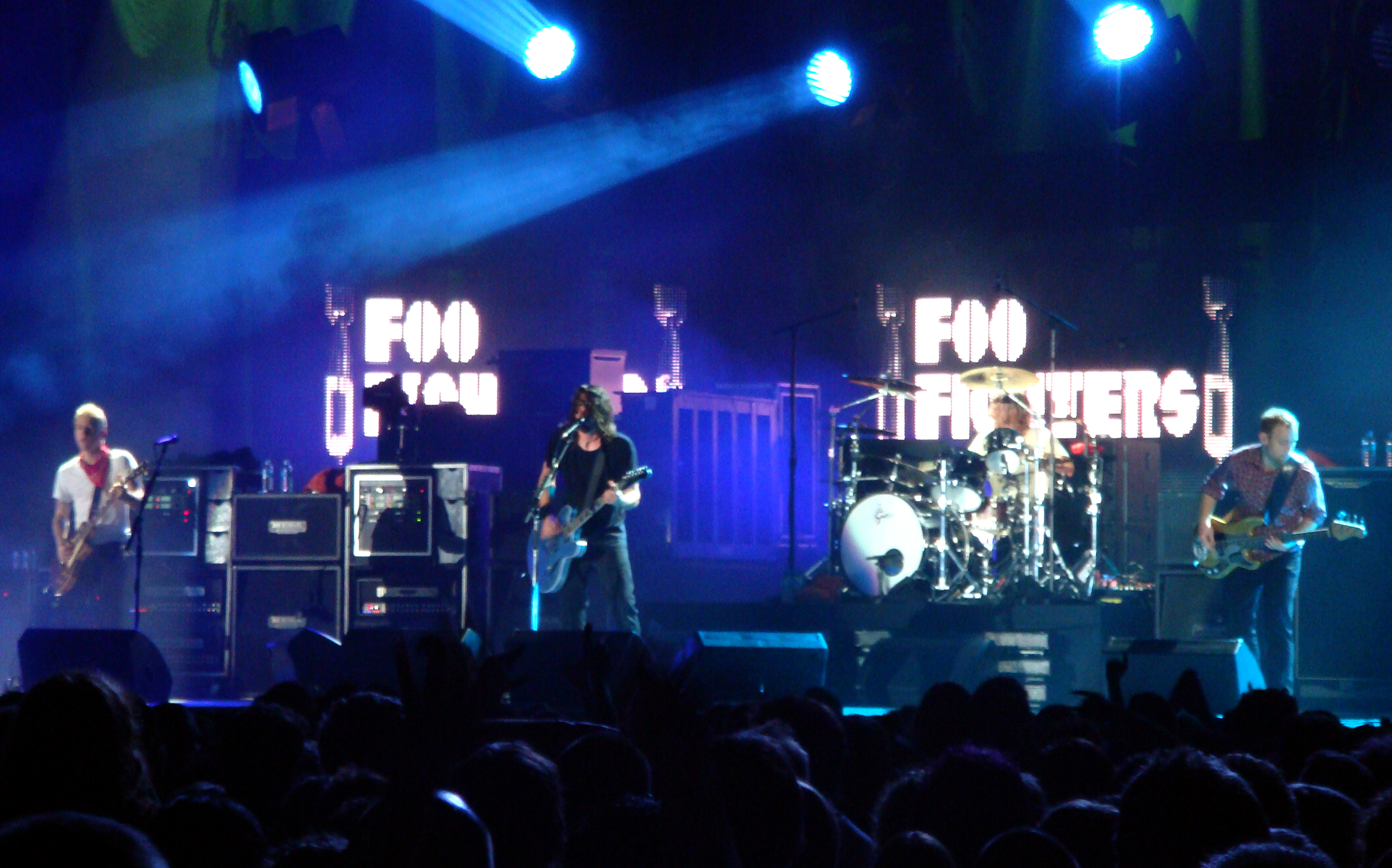
Foo Fighters spent five weeks at number one in 2017: two with "Run" and three with "The Sky Is a Neighborhood".

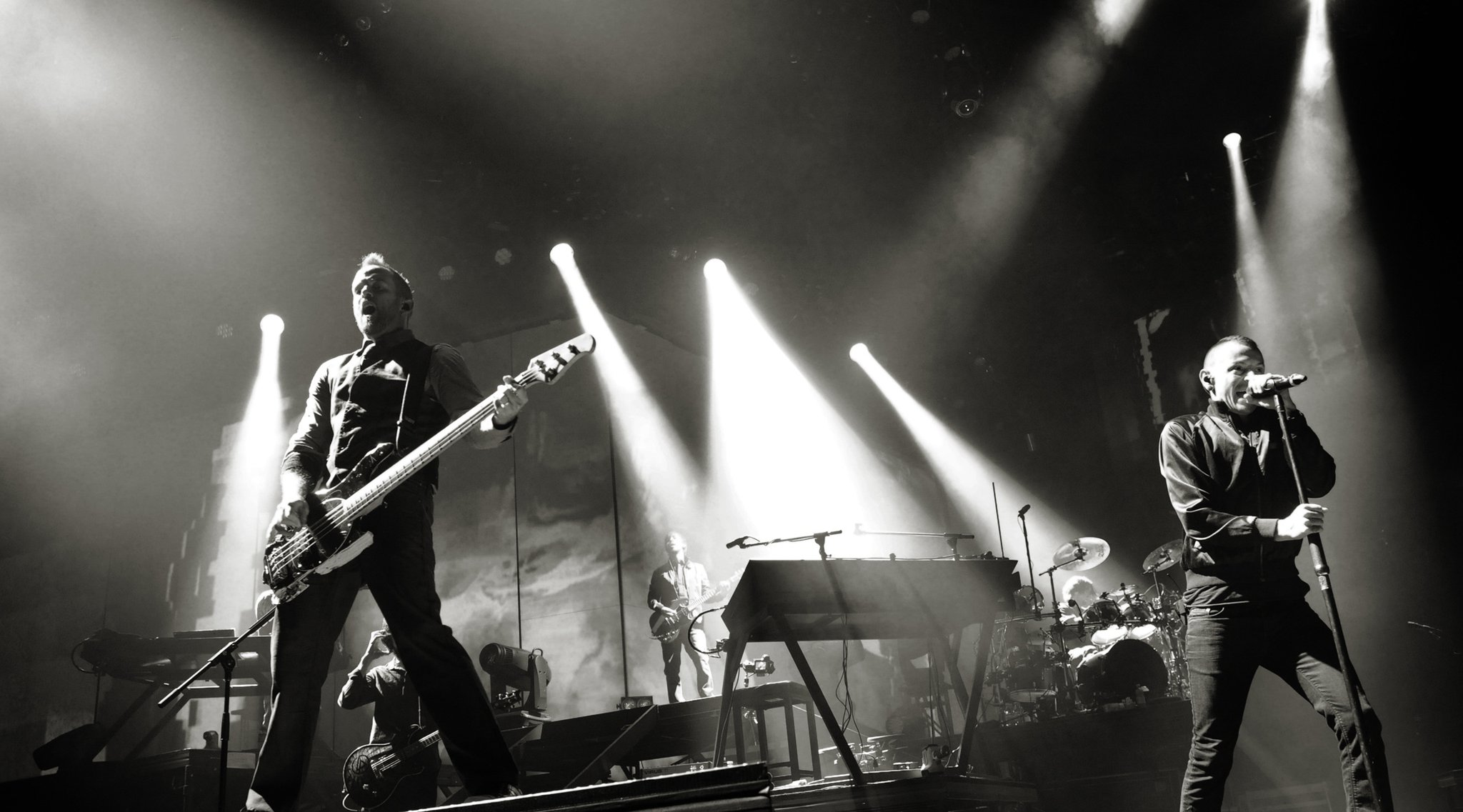
Linkin Park's "Numb" topped the chart following the death of the band's singer Chester Bennington on 20 July 2017.

| Issue date | Single | Artist(s) | Record label(s) | Ref. |
|---|---|---|---|---|
| 5 January | "Christmas Time (Don't Let the Bells End)" | The Darkness | Must Destroy | |
| 12 January | "Livin' on a Prayer" | Bon Jovi | Mercury | |
| 19 January | "Take on the World" | You Me at Six | Infectious | |
| 26 January | "Can't Stop" | Red Hot Chili Peppers | Warner Bros. | |
| 2 February | "Can't Stop" | Red Hot Chili Peppers | Warner Bros. | |
| 9 February | "Can't Stop" | Red Hot Chili Peppers | Warner Bros. | |
| 16 February | "Can't Stop" | Red Hot Chili Peppers | Warner Bros. | |
| 23 February | "Iris" | Goo Goo Dolls | Warner Bros. | |
| 2 March | "Dirty Laundry" | All Time Low | Fueled by Ramen | |
| 9 March | "Can't Stop" | Red Hot Chili Peppers | Warner Bros. | |
| 16 March | "Sweet Child o' Mine" | Guns N' Roses | Geffen | |
| 23 March | "Can't Stop" | Red Hot Chili Peppers | Warner Bros. | |
| 30 March | "Can't Stop" | Red Hot Chili Peppers | Warner Bros. | |
| 6 April | "Sweet Child o' Mine" | Guns N' Roses | Geffen | |
| 13 April | "Sweet Child o' Mine" | Guns N' Roses | Geffen | |
| 20 April | "Can't Stop" | Red Hot Chili Peppers | Warner Bros. | |
| 27 April | "Lights Out" | Royal Blood | Warner Bros. | |
| 4 May | "Lights Out" | Royal Blood | Warner Bros. | |
| 11 May | "Can't Stop" | Red Hot Chili Peppers | Warner Bros. | |
| 18 May | "Can't Stop" | Red Hot Chili Peppers | Warner Bros. | |
| 25 May | "Can't Stop" | Red Hot Chili Peppers | Warner Bros. | |
| 1 June | "Hook, Line & Sinker" | Royal Blood | Warner Bros. | |
| 8 June | "Can't Stop" | Red Hot Chili Peppers | Warner Bros. | |
| 15 June | "Run" | Foo Fighters | RCA | |
| 22 June | "Run" | Foo Fighters | RCA | |
| 29 June | "Lights Out" | Royal Blood | Warner Bros. | |
| 6 July | "Lights Out" | Royal Blood | Warner Bros. | |
| 13 July | "Lights Out" | Royal Blood | Warner Bros. | |
| 20 July | "Can't Stop" | Red Hot Chili Peppers | Warner Bros. | |
| 27 July | "Can't Stop" | Red Hot Chili Peppers | Warner Bros. | |
| 3 August | "Numb" | Linkin Park | Warner Bros. | |
| 10 August | "Numb" | Linkin Park | Warner Bros. | |
| 17 August | "Numb" | Linkin Park | Warner Bros. | |
| 24 August | "Numb" | Linkin Park | Warner Bros. | |
| 31 August | "Numb" | Linkin Park | Warner Bros. | |
| 7 September | "Walk on Water" | Thirty Seconds to Mars | Interscope | |
| 14 September | "My Immortal" | Evanescence | Virgin/Wind-up | |
| 21 September | "Walk on Water" | Thirty Seconds to Mars | Interscope | |
| 28 September | "The Sky Is a Neighborhood" | Foo Fighters | Columbia | |
| 5 October | "The Sky Is a Neighborhood" | Foo Fighters | Columbia | |
| 12 October | "The Sky Is a Neighborhood" | Foo Fighters | Columbia | |
| 19 October | "Can't Stop" | Red Hot Chili Peppers | Warner Bros. | |
| 26 October | "Can't Stop" | Red Hot Chili Peppers | Warner Bros. | |
| 2 November | "Can't Stop" | Red Hot Chili Peppers | Warner Bros. | |
| 9 November | "Highway to Hell" | AC/DC | Columbia | |
| 16 November | "Immigrant Song" | Led Zeppelin | Atlantic | |
| 23 November | "Can't Stop" | Red Hot Chili Peppers | Warner Bros. | |
| 30 November | "Can't Stop" | Red Hot Chili Peppers | Warner Bros. | |
| 7 December | "Can't Stop" | Red Hot Chili Peppers | Warner Bros. | |
| 14 December | "Christmas Time (Don't Let the Bells End)" | The Darkness | Must Destroy | |
| 21 December | "Christmas Time (Don't Let the Bells End)" | The Darkness | Must Destroy | |
| 28 December | "Christmas Time (Don't Let the Bells End)" | The Darkness | Must Destroy | |

== See also ==
- 2017 in British music
- List of UK Rock & Metal Albums Chart number ones of 2017
