= List of UK R&B Singles Chart number ones of 2017 =

The logo of the Official Charts Company, responsible for compiling all of the official music charts in the United Kingdom, including the R&B singles chart.

The UK R&B Singles Chart is a weekly chart that ranks the 40 biggest-selling singles and albums that are classified in the R&B genre in the United Kingdom. The chart is compiled by the Official Charts Company, and is based on both physical, and digital sales.

The following are the songs which have topped the UK R&B Singles Chart in 2017.

== Number-one singles ==
Key
†	Best-selling R&B single of the year

Chart date (week ending)	Song	Artist(s)	Record label	References
5 January	"Black Beatles"	Rae Sremmurd featuring Gucci Mane	EarDrummers/Interscope	
12 January	"Black Beatles"	Rae Sremmurd featuring Gucci Mane	EarDrummers/Interscope	
19 January	"Black Beatles"	Rae Sremmurd featuring Gucci Mane	EarDrummers/Interscope	
26 January	"Fake Love"	Drake	Cash Money/Republic	
2 February	"Now and Later"	Sage the Gemini	Atlantic	
9 February	"Now and Later"	Sage the Gemini	Atlantic	
16 February	"Big for Your Boots"	Stormzy	Merky	
23 February	"Big for Your Boots"	Stormzy	Merky	
2 March	"Big for Your Boots"	Stormzy	Merky	
9 March ^{[b]}	"Big for Your Boots"	Stormzy	Merky	
16 March ^{[b]}	"Big for Your Boots"	Stormzy	Merky	
23 March ^{[b]}	"Big for Your Boots"	Stormzy	Merky	
30 March ^{[b]}	"Passionfruit"	Drake	Cash Money/Republic	
6 April ^{[b]}	"Passionfruit"	Drake	Cash Money/Republic	
13 April ^{[b]}	"Passionfruit"	Drake	Cash Money/Republic	
20 April ^{[b]}	"Passionfruit"	Drake	Cash Money/Republic	
27 April	"Passionfruit"	Drake	Cash Money/Republic	
4 May	"Passionfruit"	Drake	Cash Money/Republic	
11 May	"Swalla"	Jason Derulo featuring Nicki Minaj & Ty Dolla Sign	Warner Bros.	
18 May	"Swalla"	Jason Derulo featuring Nicki Minaj & Ty Dolla Sign	Warner Bros.	
25 May	"Swalla"	Jason Derulo featuring Nicki Minaj & Ty Dolla Sign	Warner Bros.	
1 June	"Unforgettable" †	French Montana featuring Swae Lee	Bad Boy/Epic	
8 June	"Unforgettable" †	French Montana featuring Swae Lee	Bad Boy/Epic	
15 June	"Unforgettable" †	French Montana featuring Swae Lee	Bad Boy/Epic	
22 June	"Unforgettable" †	French Montana featuring Swae Lee	Bad Boy/Epic	
29 June	"Wild Thoughts"	DJ Khaled featuring Rihanna & Bryson Tiller	Black Butter/We The Best	
6 July ^{[b]}	"Wild Thoughts"	DJ Khaled featuring Rihanna & Bryson Tiller	Black Butter/We The Best	
13 July	"Wild Thoughts"	DJ Khaled featuring Rihanna & Bryson Tiller	Black Butter/We The Best	
20 July	"Wild Thoughts"	DJ Khaled featuring Rihanna & Bryson Tiller	Black Butter/We The Best	
27 July ^{[a]}	"Wild Thoughts"	DJ Khaled featuring Rihanna & Bryson Tiller	Black Butter/We The Best	
3 August	"Wild Thoughts"	DJ Khaled featuring Rihanna & Bryson Tiller	Black Butter/We The Best	
10 August	"Wild Thoughts"	DJ Khaled featuring Rihanna & Bryson Tiller	Black Butter/We The Best	
17 August	"Unforgettable" †	French Montana featuring Swae Lee	Bad Boy/Epic	
24 August	"Unforgettable" †	French Montana featuring Swae Lee	Bad Boy/Epic	
31 August	"Unforgettable" †	French Montana featuring Swae Lee	Bad Boy/Epic	
7 September	"Unforgettable" †	French Montana featuring Swae Lee	Bad Boy/Epic	
14 September	"Unforgettable" †	French Montana featuring Swae Lee	Bad Boy/Epic	
21 September	"Unforgettable" †	French Montana featuring Swae Lee	Bad Boy/Epic	
28 September	"Rockstar"	Post Malone featuring 21 Savage	Republic	
5 October	"Rockstar"	Post Malone featuring 21 Savage	Republic	
12 October ^{[a]}	"Rockstar"	Post Malone featuring 21 Savage	Republic	
19 October ^{[a]}	"Rockstar"	Post Malone featuring 21 Savage	Republic	
26 October ^{[a]}	"Rockstar"	Post Malone featuring 21 Savage	Republic	
2 November ^{[a]}	"Rockstar"	Post Malone featuring 21 Savage	Republic	
9 November	"Rockstar"	Post Malone featuring 21 Savage	Republic	
16 November	"Rockstar"	Post Malone featuring 21 Savage	Republic	
23 November	"Rockstar"	Post Malone featuring 21 Savage	Republic	
30 November	"Rockstar"	Post Malone featuring 21 Savage	Republic	
7 December	"Rockstar"	Post Malone featuring 21 Savage	Republic	
14 December	"Rockstar"	Post Malone featuring 21 Savage	Republic	
21 December	"Rockstar"	Post Malone featuring 21 Savage	Republic	
28 December ^{[b]}	"River"	Eminem featuring Ed Sheeran	Interscope	

== Notes ==
- ^{a} - The single was simultaneously number-one on the UK Singles Chart.
- ^{b} - The artist was simultaneously number-one on the R&B Albums Chart.

== See also ==
- List of UK Singles Chart number ones of 2017
- List of UK R&B Albums Chart number ones of 2017
- List of UK Dance Singles Chart number ones of 2017
