= List of UK Rock & Metal Albums Chart number ones of 2017 =

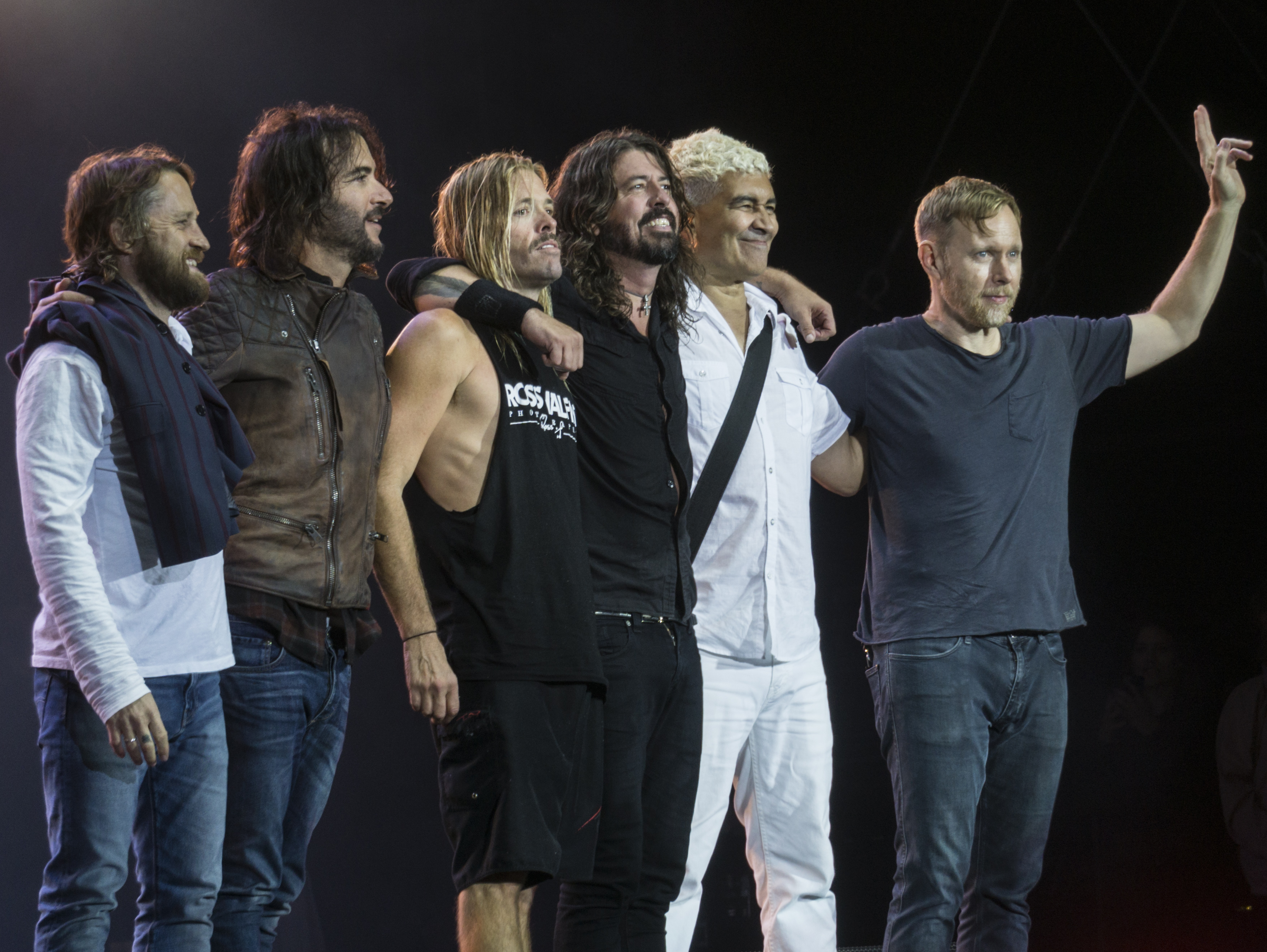
Concrete and Gold by Foo Fighters was the longest-running UK Rock & Metal Albums Chart number one album of 2017, spending eight weeks atop the chart.

The UK Rock & Metal Albums Chart is a record chart which ranks the best-selling rock and heavy metal albums in the United Kingdom. Compiled and published by the Official Charts Company, the data is based on each album's weekly physical sales, digital downloads and streams. In 2017, there were 32 albums that topped the 52 published charts. The first number-one album of the year was Metallica's tenth studio album Hardwired... to Self-Destruct, which had been at the top of the chart since 1 December 2016. The final number-one album of the year was the live album One More Light Live by American alternative rock band Linkin Park.

The most successful album on the UK Rock & Metal Albums Chart in 2017 was Concrete and Gold by American alternative rock band Foo Fighters, which spent a total of eight weeks at number one. How Did We Get So Dark?, the second studio album by Royal Blood, spent five weeks at number one; Thunder's Rip It Up and Queens of the Stone Age's Villains were each number one for three weeks; and five albums – Night People by You Me at Six, Return to Ommadawn by Mike Oldfield, Infinite by Deep Purple, Is This the Life We Really Want? by Roger Waters and Paranormal by Alice Cooper – all spent two weeks at number one during the year.

== Chart history ==
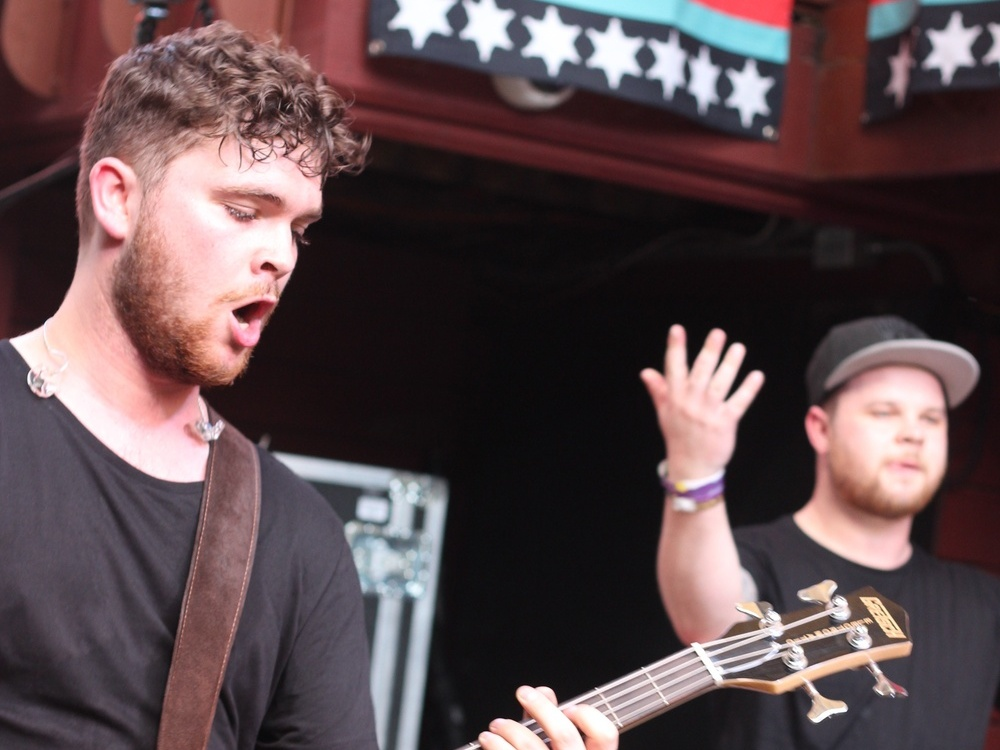
How Did We Get So Dark? by Royal Blood spent five weeks at number one on the UK Rock & Metal Albums Chart.

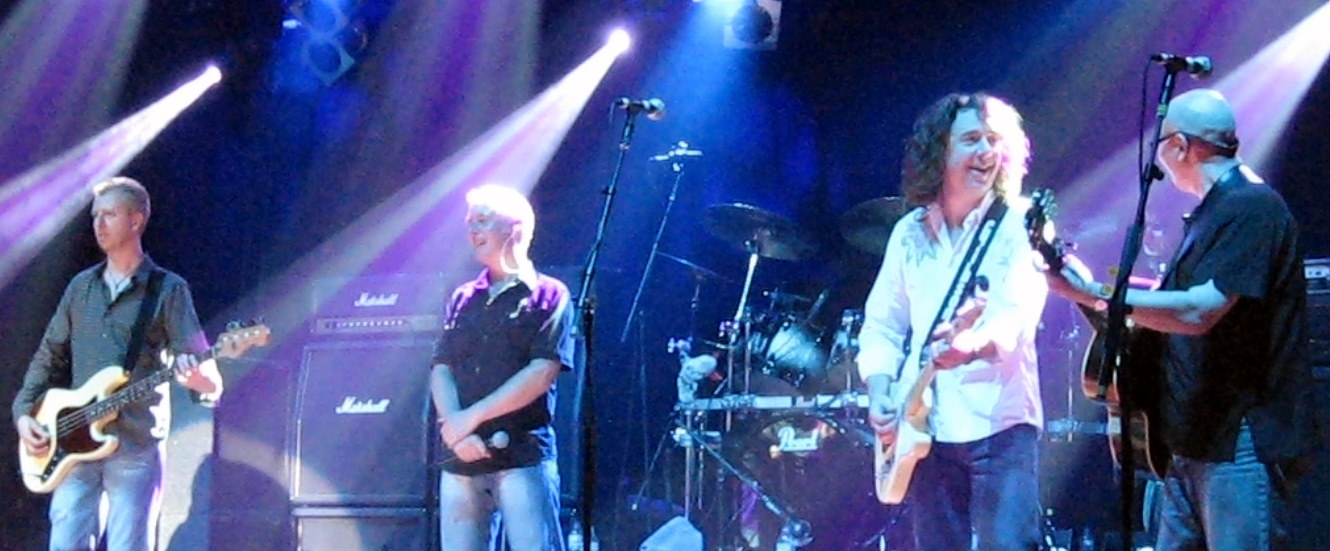
Thunder's eleventh studio album Rip It Up spent three consecutive weeks at number one on the chart.

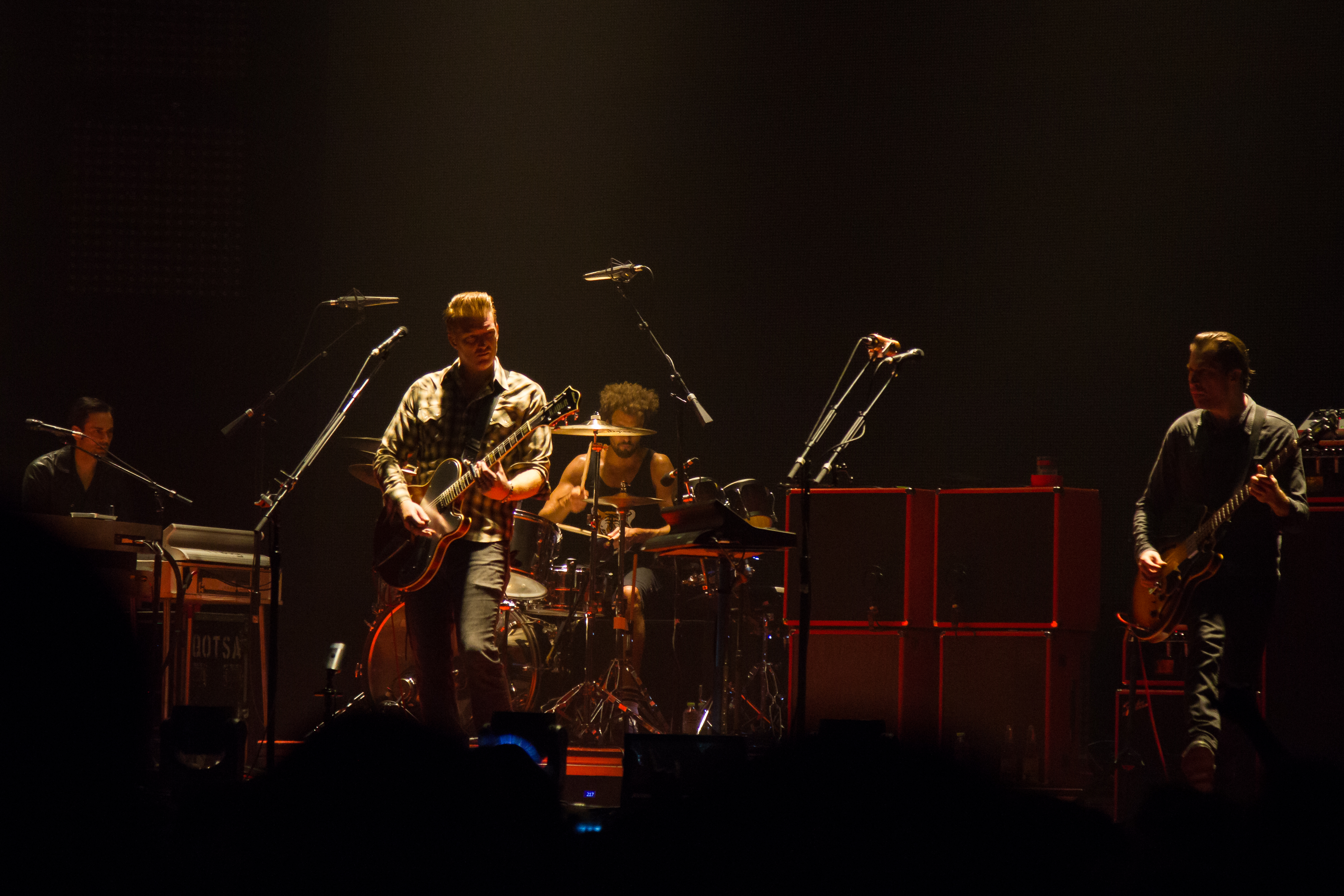
Villains by Queens of the Stone Age spent three weeks at number one.

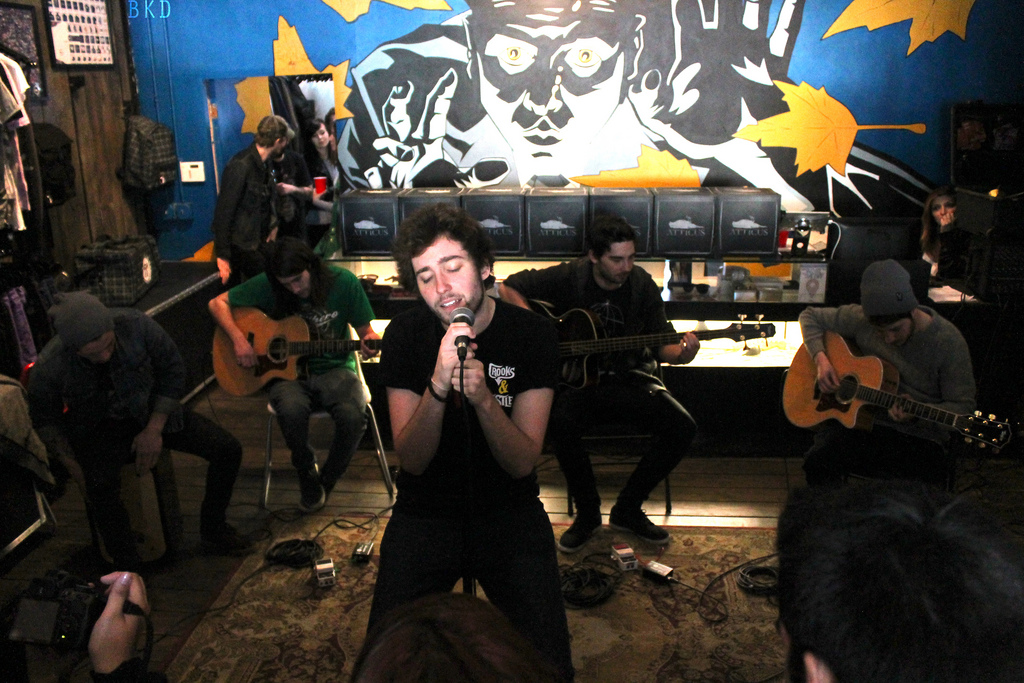
You Me at Six spent two weeks at number one in 2017 to date with their fifth studio album Night People.

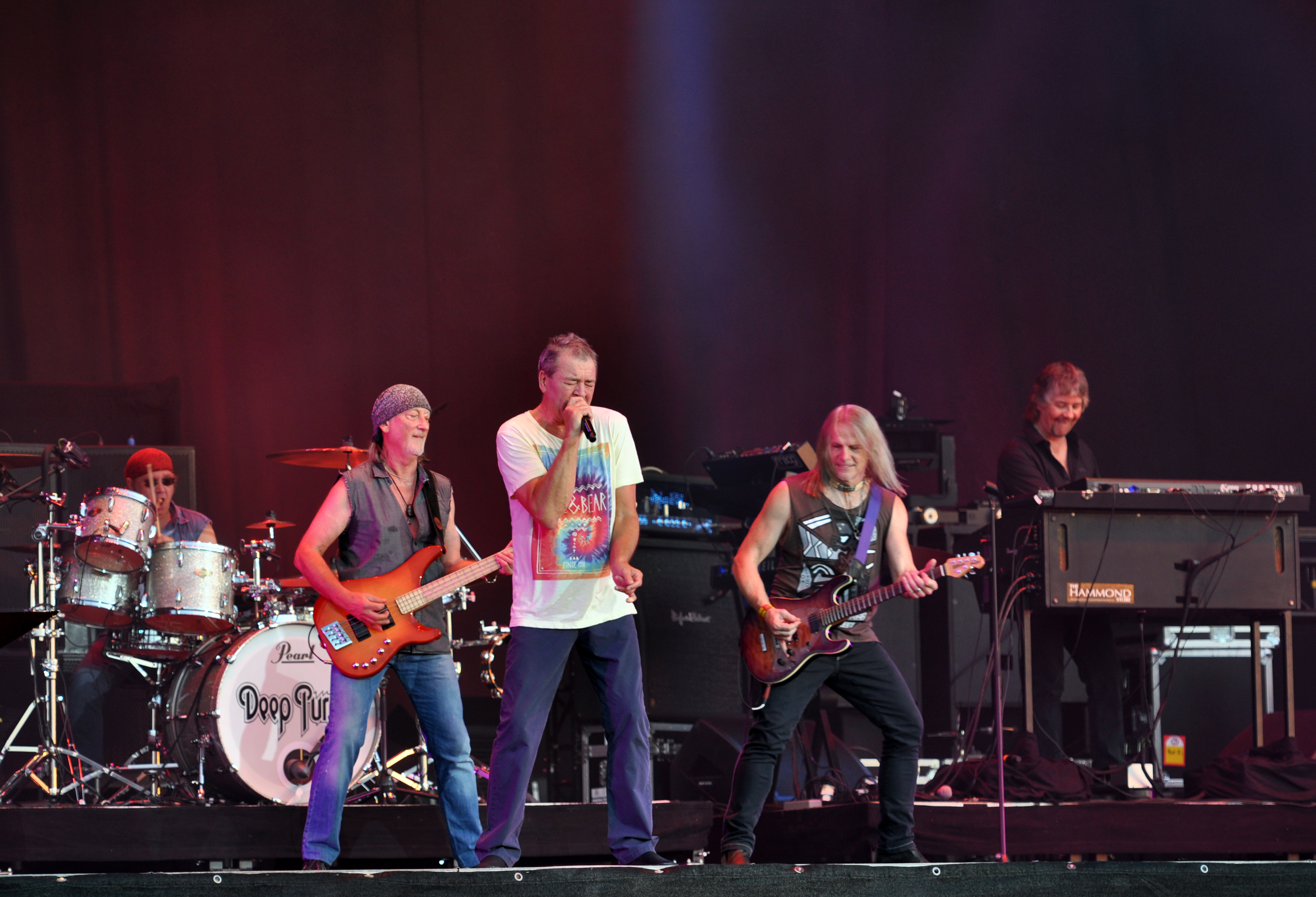
Deep Purple's twentieth studio album Infinite was number one on the chart for two weeks during 2017.

Key
†	Indicates best-selling rock album of 2017

Issue date	Album	Artist(s)	Record label(s)	Ref.
5 January	Hardwired... to Self-Destruct	Metallica	Blackened/Vertigo	
12 January	Ellipsis	Biffy Clyro	14th Floor	
19 January	Night People	You Me at Six	Infectious	
26 January	Night People	You Me at Six	Infectious	
2 February	Return to Ommadawn	Mike Oldfield	Mercury	
9 February	Return to Ommadawn	Mike Oldfield	Mercury	
16 February	Heavy Fire	Black Star Riders	Nuclear Blast	
23 February	Rip It Up	Thunder	earMusic	
2 March	Rip It Up	Thunder	earMusic	
9 March	Rip It Up	Thunder	earMusic	
16 March	We Are X Original Soundtrack	X Japan	Legacy	
23 March	Wired	Mallory Knox	Search and Destroy	
30 March	Nevermind	Nirvana	Geffen	
6 April	Eternity, in Your Arms	Creeper	Roadrunner	
13 April	Emperor of Sand	Mastodon	Reprise	
20 April	Infinite	Deep Purple	earMusic	
27 April	Infinite	Deep Purple	earMusic	
4 May	You Are We	While She Sleeps	While She Sleeps	
11 May	Grimspound	Big Big Train	Giant Electric Pea	
18 May	In•ter a•li•a	At the Drive-In	Rise	
25 May	Inglorious II	Inglorious	Frontiers	
1 June	California	Blink-182	BMG	
8 June	No Grave But the Sea	Alestorm	Napalm	
15 June	Is This the Life We Really Want?	Roger Waters	Columbia	
22 June	Is This the Life We Really Want?	Roger Waters	Columbia	
29 June	How Did We Get So Dark?	Royal Blood	Warner Bros.	
6 July	How Did We Get So Dark?	Royal Blood	Warner Bros.	
13 July	Hydrograd	Stone Sour	Roadrunner	
20 July	How Did We Get So Dark?	Royal Blood	Warner Bros.	
27 July	How Did We Get So Dark?	Royal Blood	Warner Bros.	
3 August	Hybrid Theory	Linkin Park	Warner Bros.	
10 August	Paranormal	Alice Cooper	earMusic	
17 August	Paranormal	Alice Cooper	earMusic	
24 August	How Did We Get So Dark?	Royal Blood	Warner Bros.	
31 August	The Peace and the Panic	Neck Deep	Hopeless	
7 September	Villains	Queens of the Stone Age	Matador	
14 September	Villains	Queens of the Stone Age	Matador	
21 September	Villains	Queens of the Stone Age	Matador	
28 September	Concrete and Gold †	Foo Fighters	Columbia	
5 October	Concrete and Gold †	Foo Fighters	Columbia	
12 October	Live at Pompeii	David Gilmour	Columbia	
19 October	Pinewood Smile	The Darkness	Cooking Vinyl	
26 October	Concrete and Gold †	Foo Fighters	Columbia	
2 November	The Sin and the Sentence	Trivium	Roadrunner	
9 November	Concrete and Gold †	Foo Fighters	Columbia	
16 November	Concrete and Gold †	Foo Fighters	Columbia	
23 November	Master of Puppets	Metallica	Vertigo	
30 November	The Book of Souls: Live Chapter	Iron Maiden	Parlophone	
7 December	Concrete and Gold †	Foo Fighters	Columbia	
14 December	Concrete and Gold †	Foo Fighters	Columbia	
21 December	Concrete and Gold †	Foo Fighters	Columbia	
28 December	One More Light Live	Linkin Park	Warner Bros.	

== See also ==
- 2017 in British music
- List of UK Rock & Metal Singles Chart number ones of 2017
