= 2017 in British music =

This is a summary of the year 2017 in British music.

== Events ==
- 12 January – The City of London Corporation announces a pledge of £2.5M to a feasibility study, previously halted in November 2016, for a proposed new London concert hall.
- 17 January – UK Music announced that Jo Dipple is to stand down as its CEO in June 2017.
- 18 January – Scottish Opera announces the winners of its 'Opera Sparks 2018' competition:
  - Henry McPherson – Maud
  - Lewis Murphy and Laura Attridge – untitled work
  - Matthew Whiteside and Helene Grøn – Little Black Lies
- 25 January
  - The London Festival of Baroque Music announces that Lindsay Kemp is to stand down as artistic director, and Lucy Bending is to stand down as festival manager, in May 2017, at the conclusion of the 2017 festival.
  - The Chamber Music Society of Lincoln Center announces its award of the 2017 Elise L. Stoeger Prize, for contributions to chamber music composition, to Huw Watkins.
- 27 January – Lucie Jones is selected to represent the United Kingdom in the Eurovision Song Contest 2017, with the song "Never Give Up on You", co-written by Denmark's 2013 Eurovision winner Emmelie de Forest.
- 12 February – 59th Annual Grammy Awards (see Awards section)
- 13 February – The European Union Baroque Orchestra (EUBO), currently with its administrative base in Hordley, announces its intention to relocate to AMUZ (Augustinus Muziekzentrum), Antwerp, in 2018, in the wake of the Brexit referendum. In parallel, the EUBO announces its plan to discontinue the EUBO Mobile Baroque Academy (EMBA) project at the end of March 2017.
- 28 February – The St Paul's Cathedral Choir announces the appointment of Carris Jones to its roster, the first female chorister in the choir's recorded history, effective 1 September 2017, as alto vicar choral.
- 1 March – Birmingham Conservatoire and Birmingham School of Acting announce that the two institutions are to merge, effective September 2017.
- 2 March
  - The Academy of Ancient Music announces the appointment of Alexander Van Ingen as its new chief executive.
  - The BBC announces the appointment of Neil Ferris as the new chorus director of the BBC Symphony Chorus, effective May 2017. In parallel, Grace Rossiter is to join the chorus as deputy chorus director.
- 8 March – New Music Scotland presented the inaugural Scottish Awards for New Music:
- 5 April – The Southbank Centre announces the appointment of Elaine Bedell as its next chief executive, the first woman to hold the post, effective May 2017.
- 18 April – Opera North announces the resignation of Aleksandar Marković as its music director, with his contract formally to terminate in July 2017, but where he is not to appear with the company for the remainder of the 2016–2017 season.
- 2 May – The Leeds International Piano Competition announces that Murray Perahia is to be its new patron, effective 1 June 2017.
- 9 May – The BBC announces the appointment of Sofi Jeannin as the next chief conductor of the BBC Singers, the first woman to be named to the post, effective July 2018.
- 13 May – The UK finishes 15th in the final of the Eurovision Song Contest 2017 with 111 points.
- 22 May – At a concert by American Pop Star Ariana Grande at the Manchester Arena, 22 people are killed in a suicide bomber attack.
- 25 May – The Royal Scottish National Orchestra (RSNO) announces the appointment of Thomas Søndergård as its next principal conductor, effective with the 2018–2019 season. In parallel, Peter Oundjian is to conclude his music directorship of the RSNO at the close of the 2017–2018 season.
- 4 June – At the Old Trafford Cricket Ground, the One Love Manchester benefit concert takes place, to benefit the victims of the Manchester Arena bombing. The performers included Ariana Grande, Katy Perry, Coldplay, Justin Bieber, Robbie Williams, Chris Martin, Liam Gallagher, and Marcus Mumford.
- 7 June – Glyndebourne Opera announces the appointment of Nicholas Jenkins as its new chorus master, effective 4 September 2017.
- 9–11 June – Download Festival 2017 takes place at Donington Park in Leicestershire. The main stage was headlined by System of a Down, Biffy Clyro and Aerosmith, the Zippo encore stage by Sum 41, Rob Zombie and Slayer, the Avalanche stage by Sleeping with Sirens, Simple Plan and The Dillinger Escape Plan (in their final UK appearance), and the Dogtooth stage by Exodus, Wednesday 13 and Perturbator.
- 12 June – Queen's Birthday Honours
  - Sir Mark Elder and Sir Paul McCartney are each made a Companion of Honour.
  - Sarah Connolly is made a Dame Commander of the Order of the British Empire.
  - George Benjamin is made a Knight Bachelor.
  - Chi-chi Nwanoku and Roderick Williams are each made an Officer of the Order of the British Empire.
  - Gerald Finley is made a Commander of the Order of the British Empire.
- 19 June – The BBC Cardiff Singer of the World competition results are announced:
  - Main Prize – Catriona Morison (the first-ever British winner of the Main Prize in the history of the competition)
  - Song Prize – Catriona Morison and Ariunbaatar Ganbaatar (joint prize winners)
  - Audience Prize – Louise Alder
- 22 June – The Royal College of Music Philharmonic Orchestra presents a benefit concert for residents left homeless after the Grenfell Tower fire.
- 26 June – The Royal Philharmonic Orchestra announces that Charles Dutoit is to stand down as its principal conductor, and to take the title of Honorary Conductor for Life, in 2019.
- 27 June – Arts Council England (ACE) reports its national portfolio funding decisions for the scheduled period of 2018–2022, which include the following music-related items:
  - Re-admission of English National Opera to portfolio funding, at £12.4 million per year
  - First-time funding for the British Paraorchestra
  - 3% diminished funding for the Royal Opera House, Covent Garden, and the Southbank Centre, per ACE's specific request
- 30 July – At The Proms at the Royal Albert Hall, Xian Zhang conducts the annual Prom which includes the Symphony No. 9 of Beethoven, the first woman conductor ever to do so.
- 9 August
  - The Reverend David Ingall of the St Sepulchre-without-Newgate Church in London (known as the National Musicians' Church) announces that the church is to close its hiring programme and acceptance of new bookings effective 2018.
  - Music Theatre Wales announces the appointment of Richard Baker as its consultant music director, with immediate effect.
- 15 August – The Royal Philharmonic Society announces Charles Dutoit as the recipient of the 103rd RPS Gold Medal. The RPS presented Dutoit with the medal at 17 August 2017 performance by the Royal Philharmonic Orchestra at The Proms, at the Royal Albert Hall.
- 21 September – English National Opera announces that Cressida Pollock is to stand down as its chief executive in June 2018.
- 11 October – The European Union Youth Orchestra announces its intention to relocate its administrative functions to Ferrara and Rome, Italy, in the wake of the Brexit referendum.
- 23 November – The BBC Concert Orchestra announces the appointment of Bramwell Tovey as its next principal conductor, effective January 2018, with an initial contract of 5 years. In parallel, Keith Lockhart is to stand down from the principal conductorship of the BBC Concert Orchestra, and to take the title of chief guest conductor.
- 28 November – The Association of British Orchestras (ABO) announces the election of Gavin Reid as its new chair.
- 4 December – Glyndebourne Opera announces that Sebastian F. Schwarz is to conclude his tenure as its general director in 2018.
- 5 December – The Royal Philharmonic Society announces that Rosemary Johnson is to stand down as its executive director in the summer of 2018.
- 15 December
  - The Cheltenham Music Festival announces the appointment of Alison Balsom as its next artistic director, effective in 2018, the first woman to hold the post.
  - Sinfonia Cymru announces the appointment of Peter Bellingham as its next chief executive. In parallel, Sophie Lewis is to stand down as the ensemble's chief executive at the end of January 2018.
- 21 December — The Royal Philharmonic Orchestra announces the cancellation of concert appearances by principal conductor and artistic director Charles Dutoit, pending the resolution of allegations of sexual assault against him.
- 29 December — New Year's Honours 2018
  - Barry Gibb and Ringo Starr are each made a Knight Bachelor.
  - Jonathan Freeman-Attwood is made a Commander of the Order of the British Empire.
  - Sarah Alexander, Marc Almond, and are each made an Officer of the Order of the British Empire.
  - Richard Cowie, Anthony Marwood, Bazil Meade, David Temple Nigel Tully, and Cleveland Watkiss are each made a Member of the Order of the British Empire.

== Television programmes ==
- 7 January – Let It Shine (BBC1), hosted by Graham Norton and Mel Giedroyc, with Gary Barlow, Dannii Minogue and Martin Kemp serving as judges throughout the series.
- 13 January – Sound of Musicals with Neil Brand (BBC4)
- 23 March – The Last Days of George Michael (Channel 5)
- 7 May – Babs (BBC1), biopic of Barbara Windsor
- June – The Voice Kids (ITV), hosted by Emma Willis
- 2 October – Tunes for Tyrants (BBC4), presented by Suzy Klein

== Groups formed ==
- Lowen

== Artists and groups reformed ==
- Bananarama
- Elastica
- Friendly Fires
- Jethro Tull
- Orbital
- Sleeper
- Steps
- The Streets
- The KLF
- Viva Brother

== Groups on hiatus ==
- Disclosure
- One Direction

== Groups disbanded ==
- Black Sabbath
- Brontide
- Heaven's Basement
- The Maccabees
- The Stone Roses
- Stornoway
- Vant
- We Are the Ocean
- Wild Beasts
- Xerath

== Classical works ==
- Richard Allain – Videte Miraculum
- Julian Anderson – The Imaginary Museum (Piano Concerto)
- Kerry Andrew – Archbishop Parker's Psalme 150
- John Barber – Sicut Lilium
- Gerald Barry – Canada
- Sally Beamish and David Harsent – The Judas Passion
- Judith Bingham – Ceaselessly Weaving Your Name
- Harrison Birtwistle – Deep Time
- Charlotte Bray – Blaze and Fall
- Ken Burton – Many are the wonders
- Philip Cashian – Piano Concerto ('The Book of Ingenious Devices')
- John Casken – Clarinet Quintet
- Anna Clyne – Beltane
- Marisa Cornford – The Stations of the Cross
- Tom Coult
  - Two Games and a Nocturne
  - St John's Dance
- Lyell Cresswell – Llanto (Clarinet Concerto)
- Gordon Crosse – Symphony No 3 ('Between Despair and Dawn')
- Tansy Davies – Forest (Concerto for four horns and orchestra)
- Jonathan Dove – Vadam et circuibo
- Brian Elias
  - Oboe Quartet
  - Cello Concerto
- Harry Escott – O Light of Light
- Edmund Finnis – The Air, Tuning
- Graham Fitkin – Recorder Concerto
- Alexander Goehr – The Waking
- Lori Goldston – That Sunrise (for cello and orchestra)
- Michael Zev Gordon – Violin Concerto
- Helen Grime
  - Piano Concerto
  - Fanfare
- Emily Hall – Advert – wedding dress
- Alexandra Harwood – Sinfonia Concertante (The Secret Ball)
- Simon Holt – Bagatelarañas
- Gabriel Jackson – Chorale Prelude on 'Herzliebster Jesu, was hast du verbrochen'
- Joel Jarventausta – Cantus
- Hannah Kendall – The Spark Catchers
- Oliver Knussen – O Hototogisu – fragment of a Japonisme
- Guillermo Lago – The Wordsworth Poems
- Nicola LeFanu – The Crimson Bird
- Joanna Marsh – Flare
- Grace Evangeline Mason – RIVER
- Robert Matthew-Walker – A Bad Night in Los Angeles
- Colin Matthews – It Rains
- Stuart McIntosh – A Song for St. Cecilia's Day
- Giulia Monducci – Versus
- Alasdair Nicolson – Piano Concerto No 2 (The Haunted Ebb)
- Roxanna Panufnik – Unending Love
- Ben Parry – Out of the Deep
- Joseph Phibbs – Clarinet Concerto
- Julian Philips – Winter Music
- Francis Pott – La chiesa del sole – in memoriam John Scott
- Deborah Pritchard – Edge
- Gabriel Prokofiev – Concerto for trumpet, percussion, turntables and orchestra
- Robert Quinney – Chorale Prelude on 'Nun lob, mein' Seel', den Herren'
- Emma-Ruth Richards – Sciamachy
- Colin Riley – Double Concerto for Two Cellos
- Sarah Rimkus – Mater Dei
- Alec Roth – Night Prayer
- Simon Rowland-Jones – Close Shave
- Edwin Roxburgh – Concerto for Piano and Wind Orchestra
- Oliver Rudland – Eventide
- Andy Scott – Guitar Concerto
- Thomas Simaku – The Scream
- Giles Swayne – Everybloom
- William Sweeney – Eòlas nan Ribheid (The Wisdom of the Reeds; concertino for clarinet and orchestra)
- Dobrinka Tabakova – Orpheus' Comet
- Matthew Taylor – Goddess Excellently Bright
- Mark-Anthony Turnage
  - Remembering (In Memoriam Evan Scofield)
  - Col
- Freya Waley-Cohen – String Quartet
- Joanna Ward – She Adored
- Huw Watkins – Symphony
- Kate Whitley (music) and Malala Yousafzai (text) – Speak Out
- Roderick Williams – 'Là ci darem la mano'

== Opera ==
- Danyal Dhondy and Nick Pitts-Tucker – Shahrazad
- Louis Mander and Stephen Fry – The Life to Come
- Noah Mosley and Ivo Mosley – Mad King Suibhne
- Roxanna Panufnik and Jessica Duchen – Silver Birch
- Lliam Paterson
  - The 8th Door
  - BambinO
- Julian Philips and Stephen Plaice – The Tale of Januarie
- Guto Puw and Gwyneth Glyn – Y Tŵr
- Snow (opera in three acts with music by three composers; libretto by JL Williams):
  - Act I: Lewis Murphy (music) – 'Three Ravens'
  - Act II: Lucie Treacher (music) – 'The Death of the Seven Dwarves'
  - Act III: Tom Floyd (music) – 'The Crystal Casket'
- Ryan Wigglesworth – The Winter's Tale

== Musical theatre ==
- The Band by Tim Firth, based on the music of Take That.
- Fat Friends The Musical by Kay Mellor and Nick Lloyd Webber
- Nativity! The Musical, written and directed by Debbie Isitt, and co-composed by Nicky Ager

== Film scores and incidental music ==
=== Film ===
- Harry Gregson-Williams – The Zookeeper's Wife
- Daniel Pemberton – King Arthur: Legend of the Sword
- Max Richter – The Sense of an Ending

=== Television ===
- Dan Jones – SS-GB, The Replacement
- Carly Paradis – Prime Suspect 1973
- Max Richter – Taboo
- Kevin Sargent – Tina and Bobby

== Awards ==
=== British music awards ===
- Brit Awards – see 2017 Brit Awards
- Royal Philharmonic Society Awards
  - Audiences and Engagement: East Neuk Festival, in collaboration with 14–18 NOW – Memorial Ground (David Lang)
  - Chamber Music and Song: Fretwork
  - Chamber-Scale Composition: Rebecca Saunders – Skin
  - Concert Series and Festivals: Lammermuir Festival
  - Conductor: Richard Farnes
  - Creative Communication: Beethoven for a Later Age: The Journey of a String Quartet by Edward Dusinberre (Faber)
  - Ensemble: Manchester Camerata
  - Instrumentalist: James Ehnes
  - Large-Scale Composition: Philip Venables – 4.48 Psychosis
  - Learning and Participation: South-West Open Youth Orchestra
  - Opera and Music Theatre: Opera North – Ring Cycle
  - Singer: Karita Mattila
  - Young Artists: Joseph Middleton
- Scottish Awards for New Music:
  - Achievement in New Music: Allie Robertson
  - Award for Community / Education Project: Drake Music Scotland – 'Wagner's School of Cool'
  - Large Scale Work: Helen Grime – Two Eardley Pictures: Catterline in Winter and Snow
  - New Music Performer(s) of the Year: Red Note Ensemble
  - Recorded New Work: Robert Irvine, Songs and Lullabies (Delphian Records)
  - Small/medium Scale Work: David Fennessy – Panopticon

=== Grammy awards ===
- Album of the Year – 25, Adele
- Song of the Year – 'Hello', Adele
- Best Pop Solo Performance – 'Hello', Adele
- Best Pop Vocal Album – 25, Adele
- Best Rock Performance – Blackstar, David Bowie
- Best Rock Song – 'Blackstar', David Bowie
- Best Alternative Music Album – Blackstar, David Bowie
- Best Recording Package – Blackstar
- Best Engineered Album, Non-Classical – Blackstar
- Best Classical Solo Vocal Album (tie)
  - Shakespeare Songs, Ian Bostridge and Sir Antonio Pappano
  - Schumann & Berg, Dorothea Röschmann and Dame Mitsuko Uchida

== Charts ==
=== Number-one singles ===
The singles chart includes a proportion for streaming.

Chart date (week ending)	Song	Artist(s)	Sales
5 January	"Rockabye"	Clean Bandit featuring Anne-Marie and Sean Paul	78,255
12 January	"Rockabye"	Clean Bandit featuring Anne-Marie and Sean Paul	48,182
19 January	"Shape of You" †	Ed Sheeran	226,808
26 January	"Shape of You" †	Ed Sheeran	139,595
2 February	"Shape of You" †	Ed Sheeran	119,658
9 February	"Shape of You" †	Ed Sheeran	105,456
16 February	"Shape of You" †	Ed Sheeran	95,632
23 February	"Shape of You" †	Ed Sheeran	90,428
2 March	"Shape of You" †	Ed Sheeran	82,770
9 March	"Shape of You" †	Ed Sheeran	144,385
16 March	"Shape of You" †	Ed Sheeran	140,647
23 March	"Shape of You" †	Ed Sheeran	106,286
30 March	"Shape of You" †	Ed Sheeran	83,722
6 April	"Shape of You" †	Ed Sheeran	73,823
13 April	"Shape of You" †	Ed Sheeran	65,882
20 April	"Sign of the Times"	Harry Styles	62,900
27 April	"Shape of You" †	Ed Sheeran	48,770
4 May	"Symphony"	Clean Bandit featuring Zara Larsson	54,223
11 May	"I'm the One"	DJ Khaled featuring Justin Bieber, Quavo, Chance the Rapper, and Lil Wayne	56,331
18 May	"Despacito"	Luis Fonsi and Daddy Yankee featuring Justin Bieber	71,925
25 May	"Despacito"	Luis Fonsi and Daddy Yankee featuring Justin Bieber	94,730
1 June	"Despacito"	Luis Fonsi and Daddy Yankee featuring Justin Bieber	113,912
8 June	"Despacito"	Luis Fonsi and Daddy Yankee featuring Justin Bieber	129,256
15 June	"Despacito"	Luis Fonsi and Daddy Yankee featuring Justin Bieber	101,761
22 June	"Despacito"	Luis Fonsi and Daddy Yankee featuring Justin Bieber	94,551
29 June	"Bridge over Troubled Water"	Artists for Grenfell	170,360
6 July	"Despacito"	Luis Fonsi and Daddy Yankee featuring Justin Bieber	84,124
13 July	"Despacito"	Luis Fonsi and Daddy Yankee featuring Justin Bieber	78,307
20 July	"Despacito"	Luis Fonsi and Daddy Yankee featuring Justin Bieber	72,617
27 July	"Wild Thoughts"	DJ Khaled featuring Rihanna and Bryson Tiller	51,308
3 August	"Despacito"	Luis Fonsi and Daddy Yankee featuring Justin Bieber	52,387
10 August	"Despacito"	Luis Fonsi and Daddy Yankee featuring Justin Bieber	40,891
17 August	"Feels"	Calvin Harris featuring Pharrell Williams, Katy Perry, and Big Sean	39,569
24 August	"New Rules"	Dua Lipa	41,666
31 August	"New Rules"	Dua Lipa	45,507
7 September	"Look What You Made Me Do"	Taylor Swift	65,415
14 September	"Look What You Made Me Do"	Taylor Swift	46,411
21 September	"Too Good at Goodbyes"	Sam Smith	61,685
28 September	"Too Good at Goodbyes"	Sam Smith	46,415
5 October	"Too Good at Goodbyes"	Sam Smith	43,230
12 October	"Rockstar"	Post Malone featuring 21 Savage	46,922
19 October	"Rockstar"	Post Malone featuring 21 Savage	48,834
26 October	"Rockstar"	Post Malone featuring 21 Savage	51,374
2 November	"Rockstar"	Post Malone featuring 21 Savage	49,738
9 November	"Havana"	Camila Cabello featuring Young Thug	48,615
16 November	"Havana"	Camila Cabello featuring Young Thug	50,997
23 November	"Havana"	Camila Cabello featuring Young Thug	46,269
30 November	"Havana"	Camila Cabello featuring Young Thug	48,093
7 December	"Havana"	Camila Cabello featuring Young Thug	41,438
14 December	"Perfect"/"Perfect Duet"	Ed Sheeran	89,359
21 December	"Perfect"/"Perfect Duet"	Ed Sheeran	58,436
28 December	“Perfect”/“Perfect Duet”/“Perfect Symphony”	Ed Sheeran	85,397

=== Number-one albums ===
The albums chart includes a proportion for streaming.

Key
†	Best performing album of the year

Chart date (week ending)	Album	Artist	Sales
5 January	Glory Days	Little Mix	53,157
12 January	Glory Days	Little Mix	24,962
19 January	I See You	The xx	26,513
26 January	Classic House	Pete Tong, The Heritage Orchestra and Jules Buckley	
2 February	La La Land: Original Motion Picture Soundtrack	Various Artists	
9 February	Little Fictions	Elbow	
16 February	Human	Rag'n'Bone Man	117,000
23 February	Human	Rag'n'Bone Man	
2 March	Gang Signs & Prayer	Stormzy	69,000
9 March	÷ †	Ed Sheeran	672,000
16 March	÷ †	Ed Sheeran	
23 March	÷ †	Ed Sheeran	
30 March	÷ †	Ed Sheeran	
6 April	÷ †	Ed Sheeran	
13 April	÷ †	Ed Sheeran	
20 April	÷ †	Ed Sheeran	62.108
27 April	÷ †	Ed Sheeran	53,809
4 May	÷ †	Ed Sheeran	51,205
11 May	For Crying Out Loud	Kasabian	52,000
18 May	Harry Styles	Harry Styles	57,000
25 May	÷ †	Ed Sheeran	
1 June	Sgt. Pepper's Lonely Hearts Club Band	The Beatles	
8 June	÷ †	Ed Sheeran	26,860
15 June	Truth Is a Beautiful Thing	London Grammar	43,403
22 June	How Did We Get So Dark?	Royal Blood	48,447
29 June	÷ †	Ed Sheeran	
6 July	÷ †	Ed Sheeran	27,263
13 July	÷ †	Ed Sheeran	
20 July	Night & Day	The Vamps	
27 July	Lust for Life	Lana Del Rey	
3 August	Everything Now	Arcade Fire	
10 August	÷ †	Ed Sheeran	
17 August	÷ †	Ed Sheeran	
24 August	÷ †	Ed Sheeran	
31 August	Villains	Queens of the Stone Age	
7 September	Freedom Child	The Script	
14 September	Sleep Well Beast	The National	
21 September	Concrete and Gold	Foo Fighters	61,000
28 September	Wonderful Wonderful	The Killers	51,756
5 October	Now	Shania Twain	
12 October	As You Were	Liam Gallagher	103,000
19 October	Beautiful Trauma	Pink	70,074
26 October	Listen Without Prejudice Vol. 1 / MTV Unplugged	George Michael	
2 November	Together Again	Michael Ball and Alfie Boe	
9 November	The Thrill of It All	Sam Smith	97,328
16 November	Reputation	Taylor Swift	83,648
23 November	The Architect	Paloma Faith	40,000
30 November	Who Built the Moon?	Noel Gallagher's High Flying Birds	78,000
7 December	The Thrill of It All	Sam Smith	58,299
14 December	÷ †	Ed Sheeran	
21 December	Revival	Eminem	132,000
28 December	÷ †	Ed Sheeran	

=== Top singles of the year ===
This chart was published by the Official Charts Company in January 2018

Combined	Title	Artist(s)	Peak position	Combined
1	"Shape of You"	Ed Sheeran	1	3,267,000
2	"Despacito"	Luis Fonsi and Daddy Yankee featuring Justin Bieber	1	2,300,000
3	"Castle on the Hill"	Ed Sheeran	2	
4	"Unforgettable"	French Montana featuring Swae Lee	2	1,400,000
5	"Galway Girl"	Ed Sheeran	2	
6	"Perfect"	Ed Sheeran	1	
7	"Symphony"	Clean Bandit featuring Zara Larsson	1	1,300,000
8	"Human"	Rag'n'Bone Man	2	1,100,000
9	"Something Just Like This"	Coldplay and The Chainsmokers	2	
10	"You Don't Know Me"	Jax Jones featuring RAYE	3	
11	"New Rules"	Dua Lipa	1	
12	"I'm the One"	DJ Khaled featuring Justin Bieber, Quavo, Chance the Rapper and Lil Wayne	1	
13	"Wild Thoughts"	DJ Khaled featuring Rihanna and Bryson Tiller	1	
14	"Mama"	Jonas Blue featuring William Singe	4	
15	"Solo Dance"	Martin Jensen	7	
16	"There's Nothing Holdin' Me Back"	Shawn Mendes	4	
17	"Touch"	Little Mix	4	
18	"Havana"	Camila Cabello featuring Young Thug	1	
19	"Swalla"	Jason Derulo, Nicki Minaj and Ty Dolla $ign	6	
20	"Strip That Down"	Liam Payne featuring Quavo	3	
21	"Did You See"	J Hus	9	
22	"Rockstar"	Post Malone featuring 21 Savage	1	
23	"Rockabye"	Clean Bandit featuring Anne-Marie and Sean Paul	1	
24	"Feels	Calvin Harris featuring Pharrell Williams, Katy Perry and Big Sean	1	
25	"It Ain't Me"	Kygo & Selena Gomez	7	
26	"Attention"	Charlie Puth	9	
27	"Call on Me"	Starley	6	
28	"Pretty Girl"	Maggie Lindemann	8	
29	"September Song"	JP Cooper	7	
30	"Passionfruit"	Drake	3	
31	"Your Song"	Rita Ora	7	
32	"Paris"	The Chainsmokers	5	
33	"Power"	Little Mix & Stormzy	6	
34	"Slide"	Calvin Harris featuring Frank Ocean and Migos	10	
35	"Issues"	Julia Michaels	10	
36	"That's What I Like"	Bruno Mars	12	
37	"Stay"	Zedd featuring Alessia Cara	8	
38	"One Last Time"	Ariana Grande	2	
39	"Too Good at Goodbyes"	Sam Smith	1	
40	"Ciao Adios"	Anne-Marie	9	
41	"Skin"	Rag'n'Bone Man	13	
42	"Scared to Be Lonely"	Martin Garrix and Dua Lipa	14	
43	"Mask Off"	Future	22	
44	"Big for Your Boots"	Stormzy	6	
45	"Slow Hands"	Niall Horan	7	
46	"Say You Won't Let Go"	James Arthur	1	
47	"Humble"	Kendrick Lamar	6	
48	"Came Here for Love"	Sigala and Ella Eyre	6	
49	"Chained to the Rhythm"	Katy Perry and Skip Marley	5	
50	"Be the One"	Dua Lipa	9	

=== Best-selling albums ===
No.	Title	Artist	Peak position	Sales
1	÷	Ed Sheeran	1	2,700,000
2	Human	Rag'n'Bone Man	1	
3	The Thrill of It All	Sam Smith	1	
4	Glory Days	Little Mix	1	
5	Beautiful Trauma	Pink	1	
6	×	Ed Sheeran	1	
7	Together Again	Michael Ball and Alfie Boe	1	
8	More Life	Drake	2	
9	As You Were	Liam Gallagher	1	
10	Gang Signs & Prayer	Stormzy	1	
11	A Love So Beautiful	Roy Orbison with the Royal Philharmonic Orchestra	2	
12	Moana: Original Motion Picture Soundtrack	Various artists	7	
13	Wonderland	Take That	2	
14	The Architect	Paloma Faith	1	
15	Reputation	Taylor Swift	1	
16	+	Ed Sheeran	1	
17	Listen Without Prejudice/MTV Unplugged	George Michael	1	
18	25	Adele	1	
19	Who Built the Moon?	Noel Gallagher's High Flying Birds	1	
20	Revival	Eminem	1	
21	Nat King Cole & Me	Gregory Porter	3	
22	Harry Styles	Harry Styles	1	
23	Trolls: Original Motion Picture Soundtrack	Various artists	4	
24	Christmas	Michael Bublé	1	
25	24K Magic	Bruno Mars	3	
26	Starboy	The Weeknd	5	
27	Damn	Kendrick Lamar	2	
28	Twenty Five	George Michael	1	
29	Diamonds	Elton John	5	
30	Ladies & Gentlemen: The Best of George Michael	George Michael	1	
31	Sgt. Pepper's Lonely Hearts Club Band	The Beatles	1	
32	Concrete and Gold	Foo Fighters	1	
33	Truth Is a Beautiful Thing	London Grammar	1	
34	Curtain Call: The Hits	Eminem	1	
35	Time Flies... 1994–2009	Oasis	1	
36	La La Land: Original Motion Picture Soundtrack	Various artists	1	
37	Christmas with Elvis and the Royal Philharmonic Orchestra	Elvis Presley with the Royal Philharmonic Orchestra	6	
38	Legend	Bob Marley and the Wailers	1	
39	How Did We Get So Dark?	Royal Blood	1	
40	For Crying Out Loud	Kasabian	1	
41	Legacy	David Bowie	5	
42	Dua Lipa	Dua Lipa	3	

== Deaths ==
- 8 January – Peter Sarstedt, singer, songwriter, and musician, 75
- 12 January – Larry Steinbachek, keyboardist (Bronski Beat), 56 (cancer) (death announced on this date)
- 18 January – Mike Kellie, drummer (Spooky Tooth), composer and record producer, 69
- 22 January – Pete Overend Watts, bass guitarist (Mott The Hoople), 69 (throat cancer)
- 28 January – Geoff Nicholls, keyboardist (Black Sabbath), lung cancer, 68
- 31 January
  - Deke Leonard, rock guitarist (Man), 72
  - John Schroeder, easy listening composer, arranger, songwriter (Sounds Orchestral) and record producer, 82
  - John Wetton, singer, songwriter, bassist (Asia, King Crimson, Uriah Heep), colon cancer, 67
- 3 February – Gervase de Peyer, clarinetist, 90
- 12 February – Damian, singer, musician, cancer, 52
- 17 February – Peter Skellern, singer-songwriter, 69
- 13 March – John Lever, drummer (The Chameleons), 55
- 27 March – Clem Curtis, Trinidadian British singer (The Foundations),76
- 9 April – Alan Henderson, bassist (Them), 72
- 10 April – David Angel, British violinist and founding member of the Maggini Quartet, 62
- 11 April
  - Eric Cook, heavy metal band manager (Venom) and record label executive, co-founder of Demolition Records, 55 (cancer)
  - Toby Smith, keyboardist, songwriter, producer (Jamiroquai), cancer, 46
- 13 April – Nona Liddell, violinist, 89
- 15 April – Allan Holdsworth, guitarist and composer (Bruford, U.K., Soft Machine), 70
- 18 April – Gordon Langford, British composer, 86
- 28 April – George Pratt, organist and music professor, 82
- 2 May – Norma Proctor, contralto, 89
- 5 May – Clive Brooks, drummer (Egg, The Groundhogs), 67
- 13 May – Jimmy Copley, drummer (Jeff Beck, Graham Parker, Tears for Fears), 63 (leukaemia)
- 29 May – David Lewiston, music collector, 88
- 2 June
  - Malcolm Lipkin, composer, 85
  - Sir Jeffrey Tate, conductor, 74 (heart attack)
- 6 June – Vin Garbutt, folk singer, 69 (complications following heart surgery)
- 14 June – Deborah Lamprell, opera house staff member at Holland Park Opera, 45
- 15 June – Kyla Greenbaum, pianist and composer, 95
- 13 July – John Dalby, pianist and composer, 88
- 5 August – Lee Blakeley, opera director, 45
- 28 August – Melissa Bell, singer (Soul II Soul), 53
- 6 September – Derek Bourgeois, composer, 75
- 7 September – John Maxwell Geddes, composer, 76
- 11 September – Sir Peter Hall, theatre and opera director, 86
- 22 September – Mike Carr, jazz organist and pianist, 79
- 28 September – Donald Mitchell, musicologist, 92
- 30 September – Apex (Robert Dickeson), music producer, 36
- 16 October
  - Iain Shedden, Scottish-Australian musician and journalist, 60 (laryngeal cancer)
  - Heather Slade-Lipkin, pianist, harpsichordist and teacher, 70
- 19 October – Phil Miller, musician, 68
- 22 October – George Young, British-born Australian musician, songwriter and producer, 70
- 27 October – Brian Galliford, British tenor, 53
- 13 November – Paul Brown, British opera and theatre stage designer, 57
- 7 November – Paul Buckmaster, arranger and composer, Grammy winner (2002), 71
- 18 November – Malcolm Young, Scottish-born Australian Hall of Fame guitarist and songwriter (AC/DC), 64 (complications from dementia)
- 11 December – Bruce Rankin, British tenor, 65
- 15 December – John Critchinson, jazz pianist, 82

== See also ==
- 2017 in British radio
- 2017 in British television
- 2017 in the United Kingdom
- List of British films of 2017
