= List of UK R&B Albums Chart number ones of 2017 =

The logo of the Official Charts Company, responsible for compiling all of the official music charts in the United Kingdom, including the R&B albums chart.

The UK R&B Albums Chart is a weekly chart, first introduced in October 1994, that ranks the 40 biggest-selling albums that are classified in the R&B genre in the United Kingdom. The chart is compiled by the Official Charts Company, and is based on sales of CDs, downloads, vinyl and other formats over the previous seven days.

The following are the number-one albums of 2017.

== Number-one albums ==
Issue date	Album	Artist(s)	Record label	Ref.
6 January	Starboy	The Weeknd	Republic	
13 January	Starboy	The Weeknd	Republic	
20 January	Godfather	Wiley	CTA	
27 January	Yesterday's Gone	Loyle Carner	AMF	
3 February	R&B Mixtape	Various Artists	Ministry of Sound	
10 February	R&B Mixtape	Various Artists	Ministry of Sound	
17 February	One Foot Out	Nines	XL	
24 February	Now That's What I Call R&B	Various Artists	Sony Music CG/Virgin Emi	
3 March ^{[a]} ^{[b]}	Gang Signs & Prayer	Stormzy	Merky	
10 March ^{[b]}	Gang Signs & Prayer	Stormzy	Merky	
17 March ^{[b]}	Gang Signs & Prayer	Stormzy	Merky	
24 March ^{[b]}	More Life	Drake	Cash Money/Republic	
31 March ^{[b]}	More Life	Drake	Cash Money/Republic	
7 April ^{[b]}	More Life	Drake	Cash Money/Republic	
14 April ^{[b]}	More Life	Drake	Cash Money/Republic	
21 April	Damn	Kendrick Lamar	Interscope	
28 April	Damn	Kendrick Lamar	Interscope	
5 May	Damn	Kendrick Lamar	Interscope	
12 May	Damn	Kendrick Lamar	Interscope	
19 May	Common Sense	J Hus	Black Butter/Epic	
26 May	Common Sense	J Hus	Black Butter/Epic	
2 June	True to Self	Bryson Tiller	RCA	
9 June	Throwback Hip Hop	Various Artists	Ministry of Sound	
16 June	Throwback Hip Hop	Various Artists	Ministry of Sound	
23 June	Throwback Hip Hop	Various Artists	Ministry of Sound	
30 June ^{[b]}	Grateful	DJ Khaled	Black Butter/We The Best	
7 July	TLC	TLC	Cooking Vinyl	
14 July	4:44	Jay-Z	Roc Nation	
21 July	King of the North	Bugzy Malone	Ill Gotten	
28 July	I Love R&B	Various Artists	Ministry of Sound	
4 August	I Love R&B	Various Artists	Ministry of Sound	
11 August	I Love R&B	Various Artists	Ministry of Sound	
18 August	League of My Own II	Chip	Cash Motto	
25 August	4:44	Jay-Z	Roc Nation	
1 September	4:44	Jay-Z	Roc Nation	
8 September	Damn	Kendrick Lamar	Interscope	
15 September	The Ultimate Collection	Whitney Houston	Arista	
22 September	Lemonade	Beyoncé	Columbia/Parkwood Ent	
29 September	Double Dutchess	Fergie	BMG	
6 October	Disstracktions	KSI	Island	
13 October	Wamp 2 Dem	Giggs	No BS	
20 October	FR32	Wretch 32	Polydor	
27 October	7 Days	Krept and Konan	Virgin	
3 November	Heartbreak on a Full Moon	Chris Brown	RCA	
10 November	Heartbreak on a Full Moon	Chris Brown	RCA	
17 November	Stripped – Acoustic R&B	Various Artists	Ministry of Sound	
24 November	Stripped – Acoustic R&B	Various Artists	Ministry of Sound	
1 December	Gang Signs & Prayer	Stormzy	Merky	
8 December	Gang Signs & Prayer	Stormzy	Merky	
15 December	Gang Signs & Prayer	Stormzy	Merky	
22 December ^{[a]} ^{[b]}	Revival	Eminem	Interscope	
29 December ^{[b]}	Revival	Eminem	Interscope	

== Notes ==
- ^{a} - The album was simultaneously number-one on the List of UK Albums Chart number ones of the 2010s#20167UK Albums Chart.
- ^{b} - The artist was simultaneously number-one on the R&B Singles Chart.

== See also ==
- List of UK Albums Chart number ones of the 2010s
- List of UK R&B Singles Chart number ones of 2017
