= List of UK Album Downloads Chart number ones of the 2010s =

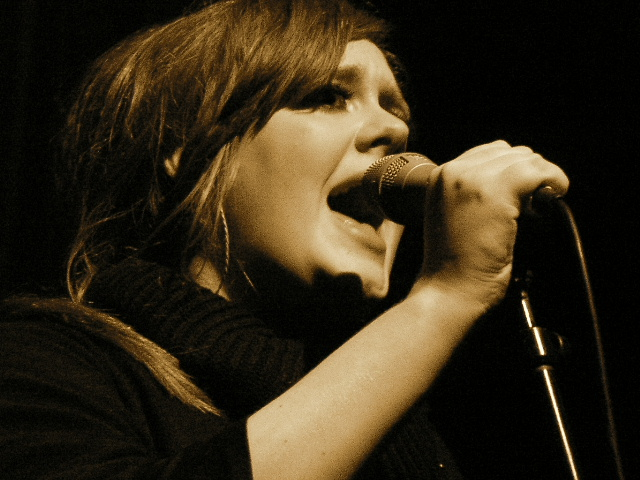
Adele spent 28 weeks at the top of the album download chart in the 2010s, longer than any other artist.

This is the list of the number-one albums of the UK Album Downloads Chart during the 2010s. As of 4 October 2019, thirty albums have returned to number one. They are: Recovery by Eminem, Now That's What I Call Xmas by various artists, Loud by Rihanna, 21 by Adele, Progress by Take That, Beyoncé's self-titled album Beyoncé, Bad Blood by Bastille, AM by Arctic Monkeys, In the Lonely Hour by Sam Smith, x by Ed Sheeran, Wanted on Voyage by George Ezra, 1989 by Taylor Swift, Now That's What I Call Music! 90 by various artists, Now That's What I Call a Summer Party by Various Artists and Now That's What I Call Music! 91 by Various Artists, 25 by Adele, Now That's What I Call Christmas! by Various Artists, A Head Full of Dreams by Coldplay, Now That's What I Call Summer Hits, Now That's What I Call Music! 94, Now That's What I Call Music! 95 by Various Artists, Classic House by Pete Tong, Now That's What I Call Music! 96, Now That's What I Call Music! 98, The Greatest Showman, Now That's What I Call Music! 99, Now That's What I Call Music! 100,A Star Is Born, Now That's What I Call Music! 103 and Divinely Uninspired to a Hellish Extent by Lewis Capaldi.

== Number-one albums ==
Key
No.	nth album to top the UK Album Downloads Chart
re	Return of an album to number one
†	Most-downloaded album of the year (Note: In 2010, the most-downloaded album of the year was Sigh No More by Mumford & Sons. It first entered the chart in 2009 and, during 2010, peaked at number three on 10 March and 4 July.)

No.	Artist (Note: The artist, album, date of reaching number one and number of weeks at number one are those given by the Official Charts Company.)	Album	Record label (Note: The record labels are those given by the Official Charts Company.)	Reached number one (for the week ending)	Weeks at number one
2010
re	Various artists	Christmas Hits – 80 Festive Favourites	Sony	2 January 2010	1
re	Lady Gaga	The Fame	Universal	9 January 2010	1
re	Florence and the Machine	Lungs	Universal	16 January 2010	1
122	Vampire Weekend	Contra	Beggars	23 January 2010	1
123	Justin Bieber	My World	Universal	30 January 2010	1
124	Various artists	Hope for Haiti Now	MTV Networks	6 February 2010	1
125	Kesha	Animal	Sony	13 February 2010	1
126	Massive Attack	Heligoland	EMI	20 February 2010	1
127	Glee Cast	Glee: The Music, Volume 1	Sony	27 February 2010	2
128	Ellie Goulding	Lights	Universal	13 March 2010	1
129	Gorillaz	Plastic Beach	EMI	20 March 2010	1
130	Glee Cast	Glee: The Music, Volume 2	Sony	27 March 2010	2
131	Various artists	Now That's What I Call Music! 75	EMI/Universal	10 April 2010	2
132	Plan B	The Defamation of Strickland Banks	Warner	24 April 2010	2
133	Glee Cast	Glee: The Music, The Power of Madonna	Sony	8 May 2010	1
134	Diana Vickers	Songs from the Tainted Cherry Tree	Sony	15 May 2010	1
135	Lady Gaga	The Remix	Universal	22 May 2010	1
136	Faithless	The Dance	Nate's Tunes	29 May 2010	1
137	Pendulum	Immersion	Warner	5 June 2010	1
138	Jack Johnson	To the Sea	Universal	12 June 2010	1
139	Christina Aguilera	Bionic	Sony	19 June 2010	1
140	Glee Cast	Glee: The Music, Journey to Regionals	Sony	26 June 2010	1
141	Eminem	Recovery	Universal	3 July 2010	2
142	Kylie Minogue	Aphrodite	EMI	17 July 2010	1
re	Eminem	Recovery	Universal	24 July 2010	1
143	Various artists	Now That's What I Call Music! 76	EMI/Universal	31 July 2010	2
144	Arcade Fire	The Suburbs	Universal	14 August 2010	1
re	Eminem	Recovery	Universal	21 August 2010	3
145	Katy Perry	Teenage Dream	Universal	11 September 2010	1
146	Brandon Flowers	Flamingo	Universal	17 September 2010	1
147	The Script	Science & Faith	Sony	25 September 2010	2
148	Mark Ronson & The Business Intl.	Record Collection	Sony	9 October 2010	1
149	Tinie Tempah	Disc-Overy	EMI	16 October 2010	1
150	Robbie Williams	In and Out of Consciousness: Greatest Hits 1990–2010	EMI	23 October 2010	1
151	Kings of Leon	Come Around Sundown	Sony	30 October 2010	2
152	Cheryl Cole	Messy Little Raindrops	Universal	13 November 2010	1
153	James Blunt	Some Kind of Trouble	Warner	20 November 2010	1
154	Take That	Progress	Universal	27 November 2010	1
155	Various artists	Now That's What I Call Music! 77	EMI/Universal	4 December 2010	1
156	Various artists	Now That's What I Call Xmas	EMI/Universal	11 December 2010	2
157	Rihanna	Loud	Universal	25 December 2010	1
2011
re	Various artists	Now That's What I Call Xmas	EMI/Universal	1 January 2011	1
re	Rihanna	Loud	Universal	8 January 2011	3
158	Bruno Mars	Doo-Wops & Hooligans	Warner	29 January 2011	1
159	Adele	21 †	XL	5 February 2011	11
160	Foo Fighters	Wasting Light	Sony	23 April 2011	1
re	Adele	21 †	XL	30 April 2011	5
161	Lady Gaga	Born This Way	Universal	4 June 2011	2
162	Arctic Monkeys	Suck It and See	Domino	18 June 2011	1
re	Take That	Progress	Universal	25 June 2011	1
163	Bon Iver	Bon Iver, Bon Iver	Beggars	2 July 2011	1
164	Beyoncé	4	Sony	9 July 2011	2
re	Adele	21 †	XL	23 July 2011	2
165	Various artists	Now That's What I Call Music! 79	EMI/Universal	6 August 2011	2
166	Jay-Z & Kanye West	Watch the Throne	Universal	20 August 2011	1
167	Nero	Welcome Reality	MTA	27 August 2011	1
168	Will Young	Echoes	Sony	3 September 2011	1
169	Red Hot Chili Peppers	I'm with You	Warner	10 September 2011	1
170	Example	Playing in the Shadows	Ministry of Sound	17 September 2011	1
171	Ed Sheeran	+	Warner	24 September 2011	1
172	Kasabian	Velociraptor!	Sony	1 October 2011	1
173	James Morrison	The Awakening	Universal	8 October 2011	2
174	Steps	The Ultimate Collection	Sony	22 October 2011	1
175	Noel Gallagher's High Flying Birds	Noel Gallagher's High Flying Birds	Sour Mash	29 October 2011	1
176	Coldplay	Mylo Xyloto	EMI	5 November 2011	1
177	Florence and the Machine	Ceremonials	Universal	12 November 2011	2
178	Snow Patrol	Fallen Empires	Universal	26 November 2011	1
179	Rihanna	Talk That Talk	Universal	3 December 2011	1
180	Olly Murs	In Case You Didn't Know	Sony	10 December 2011	1
181	Amy Winehouse	Lioness: Hidden Treasures	Universal	17 December 2011	1
182	Michael Bublé	Christmas	Warner	24 December 2011	2
2012
183	Various artists	Now That's What I Call Music! 80	EMI/Universal	7 January 2012	1
re	Adele	21	XL	14 January 2012	1
184	The Vaccines	What Did You Expect from the Vaccines?	Sony	21 January 2012	1
re	Coldplay	Mylo Xyloto	EMI	28 January 2012	2
185	Lana Del Rey	Born to Die	Universal	11 February 2012	1
186	Maverick Sabre	Lonely Are the Brave	Universal	18 February 2012	1
187	Emeli Sandé	Our Version of Events	EMI	25 February 2012	3
188	Bruce Springsteen	Wrecking Ball	Sony	17 March 2012	1
189	Michael Kiwanuka	Home Again	Universal	24 March 2012	1
190	David Guetta	Nothing but the Beat	EMI	31 March 2012	1
191	Madonna	MDNA	Universal	7 April 2012	1
192	Various artists	Now That's What I Call Music! 81	EMI/Universal	14 April 2012	3
193	Jack White	Blunderbuss	Beggars	5 May 2012	1
194	Marina and the Diamonds	Electra Heart	Warner	12 May 2012	1
195	Keane	Strangeland	Universal	19 May 2012	1
196	Tenacious D	Rize of the Fenix	Sony	26 May 2012	1
197	John Mayer	Born and Raised	Sony	2 June 2012	1
198	Gary Barlow & The Commonwealth Band	Sing	Universal	9 June 2012	2
199	Usher	Looking 4 Myself	Sony	23 June 2012	1
200	Cheryl	A Million Lights	Universal	30 June 2012	1
201	Linkin Park	Living Things	Warner	7 July 2012	1
202	Chris Brown	Fortune	Sony	14 July 2012	1
203	Frank Ocean	Channel Orange	Universal	21 July 2012	1
204	Various artists	Now That's What I Call a No.1	EMI/Universal	28 July 2012	1
205	Various artists	Now That's What I Call Music! 82	EMI/Universal	4 August 2012	3
206	Various artists	A Symphony of British Music	Universal	25 August 2012	1
re	Various artists	Now That's What I Call Music! 82	EMI/Universal	1 September 2012	1
207	Rita Ora	Ora	Sony	8 September 2012	1
208	The Vaccines	Come of Age	Sony	15 September 2012	1
209	The xx	Coexist	Beggars	22 September 2012	1
210	The Killers	Battle Born	Universal	29 September 2012	1
211	Mumford & Sons	Babel	Universal	6 October 2012	1
212	Muse	The 2nd Law	Warner	13 October 2012	1
213	Ellie Goulding	Halcyon	Sony	20 October 2012	1
214	Jake Bugg	Jake Bugg	Universal	27 October 2012	1
215	Various artists	Until Now – Swedish House Mafia	Universal	3 November 2012	1
216	Calvin Harris	18 Months	Sony	10 November 2012	1
217	Robbie Williams	Take the Crown	Universal	17 November 2012	1
218	One Direction	Take Me Home	Sony	24 November 2012	1
219	Various artists	Now That's What I Call Music! 83	EMI/Universal	1 December 2012	1
220	Various artists	Now That's What I Call Christmas!	EMI/Universal	8 December 2012	4
2013
re	Various artists	Now That's What I Call Music! 83	EMI/Universal	5 January 2013	2
re	Calvin Harris	18 Months	Sony	19 January 2013	1
221	Motion picture cast recording	Les Misérables	Universal	26 January 2013	2
222	Biffy Clyro	Opposites	Warner	9 February 2013	1
re	Jake Bugg	Jake Bugg	Universal	16 February 2013	1
223	Foals	Holy Fire	Warner	23 February 2013	1
re	Mumford & Sons	Babel	Universal	2 March 2013	1
re	Emeli Sandé	Our Version of Events	EMI	9 March 2013	1
224	Bastille	Bad Blood †	Universal	16 March 2013	1
225	David Bowie	The Next Day	Sony	23 March 2013	1
226	Justin Timberlake	The 20/20 Experience	Sony	30 March 2013	1
227	Various artists	Now That's What I Call Music! 84	EMI/Universal	6 April 2013	2
228	Paramore	Paramore	Warner	20 April 2013	1
229	Michael Bublé	To Be Loved	Warner	27 April 2013	1
230	Frank Turner	Tape Deck Heart	Universal	4 May 2013	1
231	Rudimental	Home	Warner	11 May 2013	2
232	Gabrielle Aplin	English Rain	Warner	25 May 2013	1
233	Daft Punk	Random Access Memories	Sony	1 June 2013	2
234	Disclosure	Settle	Universal	15 June 2013	2
235	Kanye West	Yeezus	Universal	29 June 2013	1
236	Tom Odell	Long Way Down	Sony	6 July 2013	1
re	Mumford & Sons	Babel	Universal	13 July 2013	1
237	Jay-Z	Magna Carta... Holy Grail	Virgin EMI/Universal	20 July 2013	2
238	Various artists	Now That's What I Call Music! 85	EMI/Universal	4 August 2013	4
239	Various artists	Teenage Dirtbags	Universal	31 August 2013	2
240	The 1975	The 1975	Universal	14 September 2013	1
241	Arctic Monkeys	AM	Domino	21 September 2013	2
242	Drake	Nothing Was the Same	Universal	5 October 2013	1
243	Justin Timberlake	The 20/20 Experience – 2 of 2	Sony	12 October 2013	1
244	Miley Cyrus	Bangerz	Sony	19 October 2013	1
245	John Newman	Tribute	Universal	26 October 2013	1
246	Katy Perry	Prism	Universal	2 November 2013	1
247	Arcade Fire	Reflektor	Universal	9 November 2013	1
248	Eminem	The Marshall Mathers LP 2	Universal	16 November 2013	1
249	Lady Gaga	Artpop	Universal	23 November 2013	1
250	Various artists	Now That's What I Call Music! 86	EMI/Universal	30 November 2013	1
251	One Direction	Midnight Memories	Sony	7 December 2013	1
re	Various artists	Now That's What I Call Christmas!	EMI/Universal	14 December 2013	1
252	Beyoncé	Beyoncé	Sony	21 December 2013	2
2014
re	Various artists	Now That's What I Call Music! 86	EMI/Universal	5 January 2014	2
re	Beyoncé	Beyoncé	Sony	18 January 2014	1
253	Various artists	The Trevor Nelson Collection 2	Sony	25 January 2014	2
254	You Me at Six	Cavalier Youth	Universal	8 February 2014	1
255	Bombay Bicycle Club	So Long, See You Tomorrow	Universal	15 February 2014	1
256	Katy B	Little Red	Sony	22 February 2014	1
re	Bastille	Bad Blood	Universal	1 March 2014	1
re	Arctic Monkeys	AM	Domino	8 March 2014	1
257	Pharrell Williams	Girl	Sony	15 March 2014	1
re	Bastille	Bad Blood	Universal	22 March 2014	1
258	George Michael	Symphonica	Universal	29 March 2014	1
259	Wilko Johnson & Roger Daltrey	Going Back Home	Universal	5 April 2014	1
260	Kaiser Chiefs	Education, Education, Education & War	Universal	12 April 2014	1
261	Various artists	Now That's What I Call Music! 87	EMI/Universal	19 April 2014	1
262	Paolo Nutini	Caustic Love	Warner	26 April 2014	2
263	Original soundtrack	Frozen	Disney	10 May 2014	1
264	Lily Allen	Sheezus	Warner	17 May 2014	1
265	Michael Jackson	Xscape	Sony	24 May 2014	1
266	Coldplay	Ghost Stories	Warner	31 May 2014	1
267	Sam Smith	In the Lonely Hour	Universal	7 June 2014	2
268	Kasabian	48:13	Sony	21 June 2014	1
269	Lana Del Rey	Ultraviolence	Universal	28 June 2014	1
270	Ed Sheeran	x †	Warner	5 July 2014	4
271	Various artists	Now That's What I Call Music! 88	EMI/Universal	2 August 2014	4
272	Various artists	Guardians of the Galaxy: Awesome Mix Vol. 1	Disney	30 August 2014	1
273	Royal Blood	Royal Blood	Warner	6 September 2014	2
re	Sam Smith	In the Lonely Hour	Universal	20 September 2014	1
274	Chris Brown	X	Sony	27 September 2014	1
275	alt-J	This Is All Yours	BMG Rights Management	4 October 2014	1
276	George Ezra	Wanted on Voyage	Sony	11 October 2014	2
277	Ella Henderson	Chapter One	Sony	25 October 2014	1
278	Ben Howard	I Forget Where We Were	Universal	1 November 2014	1
279	Taylor Swift	1989	Universal	8 November 2014	1
280	Calvin Harris	Motion	Sony	15 November 2014	1
281	Foo Fighters	Sonic Highways	Sony	22 November 2014	1
282	One Direction	Four	Sony	29 November 2014	1
283	Various artists	Now That's What I Call Music! 89	EMI/Universal	6 December 2014	1
re	Various artists	Now That's What I Call Christmas!	EMI/Universal	13 December 2014	3
2015
re	Ed Sheeran	x	Warner	3 January 2015	1
re	George Ezra	Wanted on Voyage	Sony	10 January 2015	1
re	Taylor Swift	1989	Universal	17 January 2015	2
284	Fall Out Boy	American Beauty/American Psycho	Universal	31 January 2015	1
285	Meghan Trainor	Title	Sony	7 February 2015	1
286	Dire Straits	Brothers in Arms	Universal	14 February 2015	1
287	Various artists	Fifty Shades of Grey	Universal	21 February 2015	3
288	Noel Gallagher's High Flying Birds	Chasing Yesterday	Sour Mash	14 March 2015	1
289	Madonna	Rebel Heart	Universal	21 March 2015	1
290	Kendrick Lamar	To Pimp a Butterfly	Universal	28 March 2015	1
291	James Bay	Chaos and the Calm	Universal	4 April 2015	1
292	Various artists	Now That's What I Call Music! 90	EMI/Universal	11 April 2015	1
293	Original Soundtrack	Furious 7	Warner	18 April 2015	1
re	Various artists	Now That's What I Call Music! 90	EMI/Universal	25 April 2015	2
re	Taylor Swift	1989	Universal	9 May 2015	1
294	Mumford & Sons	Wilder Mind	Universal	16 May 2015	2
295	Brandon Flowers	The Desired Effect	Universal	30 May 2015	1
296	Various Artists	The Fatboy Slim Collection	Sony	6 June 2015	1
297	Florence and the Machine	How Big, How Blue, How Beautiful	Universal	13 June 2015	1
298	Muse	Drones	Warner	20 June 2015	1
299	Various Artists	TFI Friday	Warner	27 June 2015	1
300	Various Artists	Now That's What I Call a Summer Party	EMI/Universal	4 July 2015	1
301	Various Artists	Throwback R&B	Ministry of Sound	9 July 2015	1
302	Krept and Konan	The Long Way Home	Universal	16 July 2015	1
303	Years & Years	Communion	Universal	23 July 2015	1
Re	Various Artists	Now That's What I Call a Summer Party	EMI/Universal	30 July 2015	1
304	Various artists	Now That's What I Call Music! 91	EMI/Universal	6 August 2015	2
305	Dr. Dre	Compton	Universal	20 August 2015	1
Re	Various artists	Now That's What I Call Music! 91	EMI/Universal	27 August 2015	1
306	Jess Glynne	I Cry When I Laugh	Warner	3 September 2015	1
307	The Weeknd	Beauty Behind the Madness	Universal	10 September 2015	1
308	Troye Sivan	Wild	Universal	17 September 2015	1
309	Bring Me the Horizon	That's the Spirit	Sony	24 September 2015	1
310	Lana Del Rey	Honeymoon	Universal	1 October 2015	1
311	Disclosure	Caracal	Universal	8 October 2015	1
312	Rudimental	We the Generation	Warner	15 October 2015	1
313	Various Artists	Rapper's Delight	Ministry of Sound	22 October 2015	1
314	Jamie Lawson	Jamie Lawson	Warner	29 October 2015	1
315	5 Seconds of Summer	Sounds Good Feels Good	Universal	5 November 2015	1
316	Elvis Presley	If I Can Dream	Sony	12 November 2015	1
317	Ellie Goulding	Delirium	Universal	19 November 2015	1
318	Justin Bieber	Purpose	Universal	26 November 2015	1
319	Adele	25 †	XL	3 December 2015	2
320	Coldplay	A Head Full of Dreams	Warner	17 December 2015	1
re	Adele	25	XL	24 December 2015	1
re	Various artists	Now That's What I Call Christmas!	EMI/Universal	31 December 2015	1
2016
321	Various artists	Now That's What I Call Music! 92	EMI/Universal	7 January 2016	1
re	Adele	25	XL	14 January 2016	1
322	David Bowie	Blackstar	Sony	21 January 2016	1
re	Adele	25	XL	28 January 2016	2
323	Rihanna	Anti	Universal	5 February 2016	1
re	Coldplay	A Head Full of Dreams	Warner	12 February 2016	1
324	Various Artists	Acoustic	UMTV	19 February 2016	1
re	Adele	25	XL	26 February 2016	1
325	The 1975	I Like It When You Sleep, for You Are So Beautiful Yet So Unaware of It	Dirty Hit/Universal	4 March 2016	1
re	Adele	25	XL	11 March 2016	2
326	Various artists	Now That's What I Call Music! 93	EMI/Universal	25 March 2016	5
327	Beyoncé	Lemonade	Parkwood / Columbia	5 May 2016	1
328	Drake	Views	Young Money / Republic	12 May 2016	1
329	Radiohead	A Moon Shaped Pool	XL	19 May 2016	2
330	Ariana Grande	Dangerous Woman	Universal	2 June 2016	1
331	Catfish and the Bottlemen	The Ride	Universal	9 June 2016	1
332	Bugzy Malone	Facing Time	Ill Gotten	16 June 2016	1
333	Various Artists	Throwback Summer Jamz	Ministry of Sound	23 June 2016	1
334	Red Hot Chili Peppers	The Getaway	Warner	30 June 2016	1
re	Adele	25	XL	7 July 2016	1
335	Various artists	Now That's What I Call Summer Hits	EMI/Universal	14 July 2016	1
336	Biffy Clyro	Ellipsis	Warner	21 July 2016	1
re	Various artists	Now That's What I Call Summer Hits	EMI/Universal	28 July 2016	1
337	Various artists	Now That's What I Call Music! 94	EMI/Universal	4 August 2016	4
338	Frank Ocean	Blonde	Boys Don't Cry	1 September 2016	2
re	Various artists	Now That's What I Call Music! 94	EMI/Universal	15 September 2016	1
339	Bastille	Wild World	Universal	22 September 2016	1
re	Various artists	Now That's What I Call Music! 94	EMI/Universal	29 September 2016	1
340	Passenger	Young as the Morning, Old as the Sea	Black Crow	6 October 2016	1
341	Craig David	Following My Intuition	Sony	13 October 2016	1
342	Green Day	Revolution Radio	Warner	20 October 2016	1
343	Kings of Leon	Walls	Sony	27 October 2016	1
344	Lady Gaga	Joanne	Universal	3 November 2016	1
345	James Arthur	Back from the Edge	Sony	10 November 2016	1
346	Robbie Williams	The Heavy Entertainment Show	Sony	17 November 2016	1
347	Emeli Sandé	Long Live the Angels	Universal	24 November 2016	1
348	Various artists	Now That's What I Call Music! 95	EMI/Universal	1 December 2016	2
re	Various artists	Now That's What I Call Christmas!	EMI/Universal	15 December 2016	3
2017
re	Various artists	Now That's What I Call Music! 95	EMI/Universal	5 January 2017	2
349	Pete Tong/Heritage Orchestra/Jules Buckley	Classic House	Polydor/UMC/UMOD	19 January 2017	1
350	The xx	I See You	Young Turks	26 January 2017	1
re	Pete Tong/Heritage Orchestra/Jules Buckley	Classic House	Polydor/UMC/UMOD	2 February 2017	1
351	Various Artists	R&B Mixtape	Ministry of Sound	9 February 2017	1
352	Elbow	Little Fictions	Universal Music Group	16 February 2017	1
353	Rag'n'Bone Man	Human	Best Laid Plans/Sony	23 February 2017	2
354	Stormzy	Gang Signs & Prayer	Merky	9 March 2017	1
355	Ed Sheeran	÷	Asylum	16 March 2017	5
356	Various artists	Now That's What I Call Music! 96	EMI/Universal	20 April 2017	2
357	Steps	Tears on the Dancefloor	Steps Music LLP	4 May 2017	1
358	Various artists	Guardians of the Galaxy: Awesome Mix Vol. 2	Disney	11 May 2017	1
359	Kasabian	For Crying Out Loud	Sony	18 May 2017	1
360	Harry Styles	Harry Styles	Sony	25 May 2017	2
re	Various artists	Now That's What I Call Music! 96	EMI/Universal	8 June 2017	1
361	Alt-J	Relaxer	Infectious	15 June 2017	1
362	London Grammar	Truth Is a Beautiful Thing	Ministry of Sound	22 June 2017	1
363	Royal Blood	How Did We Get So Dark?	Warner	29 June 2017	1
364	Imagine Dragons	Evolve	Interscope Records	6 July 2017	1
365	Various Artists	Laidback Beats 2017	Ministry of Sound	13 July 2017	1
366	Jay-Z	4:44	Roc Nation	20 July 2017	1
367	Bugzy Malone	King of the North	Ill Gotten	27 July 2017	1
368	Various artists	Now That's What I Call Music! 97	EMI/Universal	3 August 2017	5
369	Queens of the Stone Age	Villains	Matador	7 September 2017	1
370	The Script	Freedom Child	Sony	14 September 2017	1
371	The National	Sleep Well Beast	4AD	21 September 2017	1
372	Foo Fighters	Concrete and Gold	Sony	28 September 2017	1
373	The Killers	Wonderful Wonderful	EMI	5 October 2017	1
374	Wolf Alice	Visions of a Life	Dirty Hit	12 October 2017	1
375	Liam Gallagher	As You Were	Warner	19 October 2017	1
376	Pink	Beautiful Trauma	Sony	26 October 2017	1
377	George Michael	Listen Without Prejudice - Vol.1	Sony	2 November 2017	1
378	Stereophonics	Scream Above the Sounds	Warner	9 November 2017	1
379	Sam Smith	The Thrill of It All	Universal	16 November 2017	1
380	Taylor Swift	Reputation	Universal	23 November 2017	1
381	Various artists	Now That's What I Call Music! 98	EMI/Universal	30 November 2017	1
382	Noel Gallagher	Who Built the Moon?	Sour Mash	7 December 2017	1
re	Various artists	Now That's What I Call Christmas!	EMI/Universal	14 December 2017	2
383	Eminem	Revival	Universal	28 December 2017	1
2018
re	Various artists	Now That's What I Call Music! 98	EMI/Universal	4 January 2018	1
384	Motion Picture Cast Recording	The Greatest Showman †	Atlantic	11 January 2018	12
385	Various Artists	Now That's What I Call Music! 99	EMI/Universal	5 April 2018	2
386	Kylie Minogue	Golden	BMG	19 April 2018	1
re	Motion Picture Cast Recording	The Greatest Showman †	Atlantic	26 April 2018	1
re	Various Artists	Now That's What I Call Music! 99	EMI/Universal	3 May 2018	1
re	Motion Picture Cast Recording	The Greatest Showman †	Atlantic	10 May 2018	1
387	Various Artists	80's Soul Jams	Ministry of Sound	17 May 2018	1
388	Arctic Monkeys	Tranquility Base Hotel & Casino	Domino	24 May 2018	1
re	Motion Picture Cast Recording	The Greatest Showman †	Atlantic	31 May 2018	4
389	The Carters	Everything Is Love	RCA/Roc Nation	28 June 2018	1
390	Panic! at the Disco	Pray for the Wicked	Warner	5 July 2018	1
391	Drake	Scorpion	Cash Money/Republic	5 July 2018	1
392	Various Artists	Love Island - Pool Party	Ministry of Sound	12 July 2018	1
re	Motion Picture Cast Recording	The Greatest Showman †	Atlantic	19 July 2018	1
393	Various Artists	Now That's What I Call Music! 100	EMI/Universal	2 August 2018	4
394	Ariana Grande	Sweetener	Universal	30 August 2018	1
re	Various Artists	Now That's What I Call Music! 100	EMI/Universal	6 September 2018	1
395	Eminem	Kamikaze	Universal	13 September 2018	3
396	Christine and the Queens	Chris	Because Music	4 October 2018	1
397	Cher	Dancing Queen	Warner	11 October 2018	1
398	Motion Picture Cast Recording	A Star is Born	Universal	18 October 2018	4
399	The Prodigy	No Tourists	BMG	15 November 2018	1
400	Muse	Simulation Theory	Helium3/Warner	22 November 2018	1
401	Mumford & Sons	Delta	Gentlemen of the Road/Universal	29 November 2018	1
402	Various Artists	Now That's What I Call Music! 101	EMI/Universal	6 December 2018	1
re	Various artists	Now That's What I Call Christmas!	EMI/Universal	13 December 2017	4
2019
re	Motion Picture Cast Recording	The Greatest Showman	Atlantic	10 January 2019	4
403	Bring Me the Horizon	Amo	Sony	7 February 2019	1
404	Busted	Half Way There	Warner	14 February 2019	1
405	Ariana Grande	Thank U, Next	Universal	21 February 2019	2
re	Motion Picture Cast Recording	A Star is Born	Universal	7 March 2019	1
406	Tom Walker	What a Time to Be Alive	Sony	14 March 2019	1
407	Dido	Still on My Mind	BMG	21 March 2019	1
408	Jack Savoretti	Singing to Strangers	BMG	28 March 2019	2
409	Billie Eilish	When We All Fall Asleep, Where Do We Go?	Universal	11 April 2019	2
410	Various Artists	Now That's What I Call Music! 102	EMI/Universal	25 April 2019	2
411	Pink	Hurts 2B Human	Sony	9 May 2019	1
412	Vampire Weekend	Father of the Bride	Sony	16 May 2019	1
413	Various Artists	100% Clubland CLassix	UMOD	23 May 2019	1
414	Lewis Capaldi	Divinely Uninspired to a Hellish Extent	Universal	30 May 2019	3
415	Various Artists	Love Island - Pool Party 2019	Ministry of Sound	20 June 2019	1
416	Bruce Springsteen	Western Stars	Sony	27 June 2019	1
417	Will Young	Lexicon	Cooking Vinyl	4 July 2019	1
418	Kylie Minogue	Step Back in Time: The Definitive Collection	BMG/Rhino	11 July 2019	1
419	Various Artists	Now That's What I Call Summer Party 2019	EMI/Universal	18 July 2019	1
420	Ed Sheeran	No.6 Collaborations Project	Asylum/Warner	25 July 2019	1
421	Various Artists	Now That's What I Call Music! 103	EMI/Universal	1 August 2019	3
422	Slipknot	We Are Not Your Kind	Warner	22 August 2019	1
re	Various Artists	Now That's What I Call Music! 103	EMI/Universal	29 August 2019	1
423	Taylor Swift	Lover	EMI	5 September 2019	1
424	Tool	Fear Inoculum	Sony	12 September 2019	1
425	Post Malone	Hollywood's Bleeding	Universal	19 September 2019	1
426	Sam Fender	Hypersonic Missiles	Universal	26 September 2019	1
427	Liam Gallagher	Why Me? Why Not.	Warner	3 October 2019	1
re	Lewis Capaldi	Divinely Uninspired to a Hellish Extent	Universal	10 October 2019	1
428	Nick Cave and the Bad Seeds	Ghosteen	Ghosteen	17 October 2019	1
429	Elbow	Giants of All Sizes	Universal	24 October 2019	1
430	James Arthur	You	Sony	31 October 2019	1
431	Stereophonics	Kind	Warner	7 November 2019	1
432	Various Artists	BBC Children in Need - Got It Covered	Silva Screen	14 November 2019	1
433	Various Artists	Now That's What I Call Music! 104	EMI/Universal	21 November 2019	1
434	Westlife	Spectrum	Universal	28 November 2019	1
435	Coldplay	Everyday Life	Universal	5 December 2019	1
436	Various Artists	Now 100 Hits Christmas	EMI/Universal	12 December 2019	2
437	Stormzy	Heavy Is the Head	Atlantic/Merky	26 December 2019	1

=== By artist ===
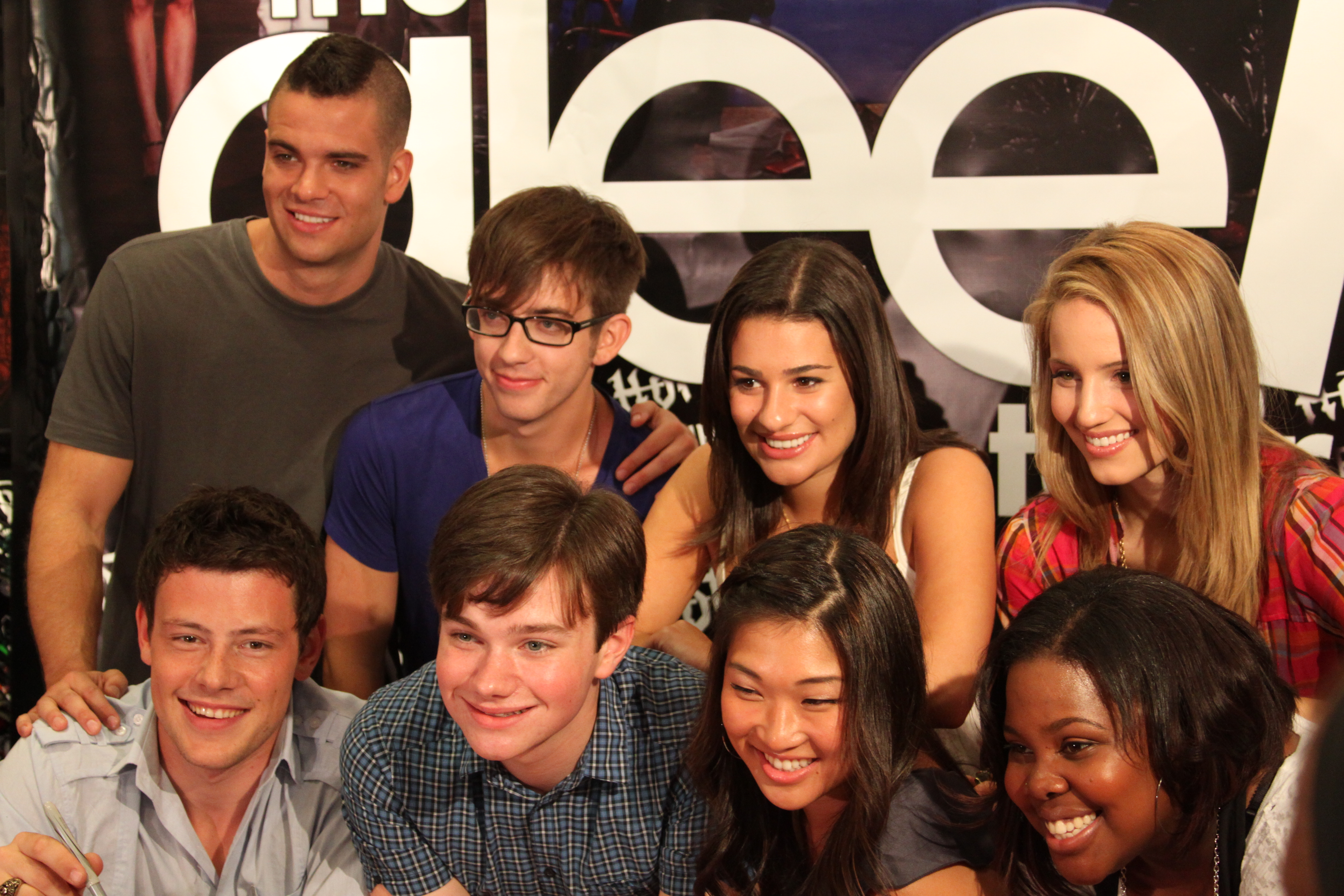
The cast of Glee have topped the album download chart with four different releases so far during the 2010s.

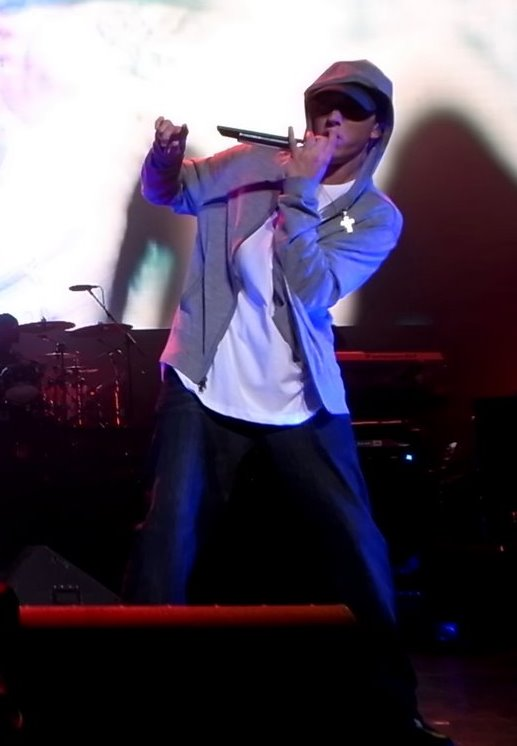
Recovery by American rapper Eminem has spent six weeks at number-one over three separate runs.

Sixteen different artists have spent four or more weeks at the top of the UK Official Download Chart so far during the 2010s. The totals below do not include compilation albums credited to various artists.

Artist	Number-one albums	Weeks at number one
Adele	2	29
Ed Sheeran	4	12
Eminem	4	11
Coldplay	4	7
Florence and the Machine	3	4
Glee Cast	4	6
Beyoncé	3	6
Rihanna	3	6
Lady Gaga	5	6
Emeli Sandé	2	5
Arctic Monkeys	3	5
Taylor Swift	3	6
Mumford & Sons	3	6
Jay-Z	3	4
Sam Smith	2	4
Ariana Grande	3	4

=== By record label ===
Twenty seven different record labels have released chart-topping albums so far during the 2010s.The totals below do not include compilation albums credited to various artists apart from soundtracks which are included.

Record label	Number-one albums	Weeks at number one
XL	3	31
Beggars Group	3	3
Domino Records	3	5
EMI	25	54
Ministry of Sound	4	4
Ill Gotten	2	2
MTA Records	1	1
MTV Networks	1	1
Nate's Tunes	1	1
Boys Don't Cry	1	2
Sony Music Entertainment	70	84
Sour Mash	3	3
Universal Music Group	114	174
Warner Music Group	41	69
Disney	3	3
BMG	6	7
Black Crow	1	1
Young Turks	1	1
Merky	1	1
Asylum	2	6
Steps Music LLP	1	1
Infectious	1	1
Roc Nation	2	2
Matador	1	1
4AD	1	1
Dirty Hit	1	1
Ghosteen	1	1
Because Music	1	1
Cooking Vinyl	1	1

== See also ==
- List of UK Compilation Chart number ones of the 2010s
