= Human Traffic (soundtrack) =

Soundtrack album by Various Artists
- Released: (United Kingdom) 20 September 1999
- Genres: House, hip hop, breakbeat
- Length: 154:05
- Label: London Records
- Producer: Pete Tong (CD2)

Professional ratings
Review scores
| Source | Rating |
|---|---|
| Allmusic | 3/5 stars |

Essential Selection Presents Music From The Motion Picture Human Traffic is a soundtrack album to the British independent film Human Traffic, both released in 1999.

It includes music by contemporary dance music producers. The second CD is mixed by British DJ Pete Tong.

== Track listing ==
CD1
| No. | Title | Artist | Length |
|---|---|---|---|
| 1. | "The Weekend Has Landed" | | 0:38 |
| 2. | "It Ain't Gonna Be Me" | C. J. Bolland | 3:44 |
| 3. | "Build It Up – Tear It Down" | Fatboy Slim | 5:02 |
| 4. | "Moff's Lyrical Miracle Madness (Human Traffic Theme)" | | 0:49 |
| 5. | "Cookies" | Jacknife Lee | 4:54 |
| 6. | "Scared" | Lucid | 6:13 |
| 7. | "Spliff Politics" | | 0:16 |
| 8. | "Bucket Wipe" | Position Normal | 1:52 |
| 9. | "Hip Hop Intro" | | 0:40 |
| 10. | "My Last Request" | Grim | 3:02 |
| 11. | "Hip Hop Outro" | | 0:28 |
| 12. | "You're Gonna Get Yours" | Public Enemy | 4:04 |
| 13. | "Dirt" | Death in Vegas | 3:51 |
| 14. | "Jungle Intro" | | 0:10 |
| 15. | "Never Believe" | Dillinja | 5:59 |
| 16. | "The Mood Club" | First Born | 4:09 |
| 17. | "What Was I Talking About?" | | 1:53 |
| 18. | "Ogive" | William Orbit | 6:41 |
| 19. | "All Day" | Interfearence | 6:14 |
| 20. | "King Tito's Gloves" | Deadly Avenger | 4:52 |
| 21. | "Comedown Sermon" | | 0:59 |
| 22. | "Belfast" | Orbital | 7:56 |
| 23. | "Human Traffic Theme" | Matthew Herbert & Robert Mello | 3:54 |

CD2
| No. | Title | Artist | Length |
|---|---|---|---|
| 1. | "Star Wars Theory" | | 0:31 |
| 2. | "Flowerz" (feat. Roland Clark) | Armand Van Helden | 9:00 |
| 3. | "Under The Water" (feat. Frank'ee) | Brother Brown | 4:22 |
| 4. | "Atlanta" | Pete Heller | 5:46 |
| 5. | "Push It" | Quake | 3:38 |
| 6. | "5:55" | Durango | 2:59 |
| 7. | "My Fellow Boppers" | Thee Maddkatt Courtship | 5:13 |
| 8. | "The Age of Love" | Age of Love | 5:45 |
| 9. | "Cafe Del Mar '98" | Energy 52 | 4:57 |
| 10. | "Diving Faces" | Liquid Child | 5:22 |
| 11. | "Out Of The Blue" | System F | 5:50 |
| 12. | "The Latin Theme" | Carl Cox | 5:22 |
| 13. | "Kittens" | Underworld | 5:20 |
| 14. | "Dark Air" | Quake | 2:32 |
| 15. | "The Tingler" | C. J. Bolland | 3:05 |
| 16. | "We're All In This Together (Plus Score Music)" | | 0:22 |
| 17. | "Come Together" | Primal Scream | 5:25 |
