= Essential Selection =

BBC radio show

- Genre: Electronic dance music, house
- Running time: 2 hours
- Country of origin: United Kingdom
- Home station: BBC Radio 1 Digitally Imported; Radio syndication
- Starring: Pete Tong & various artists
- Created by: Eddie Gordon
- Original release: 11 January 1991 – present
- No. of episodes: 1287

The Essential Selection is a radio show on Friday evenings on BBC Radio 1, originally conceived by producer Eddie Gordon and hosted by Pete Tong.

== History ==
"The Essential Mix programme was originally produced by Radio 1 producer Eddie Gordon, who held the post from 1993 to 2001. After receiving weekly mix shows from DJs Tony Humphries and Frankie Knuckles on two-hour cassettes from New York's Hot 97 and KISS 100 respectively in the early Nineties Eddie felt that a Radio 1 weekly show with DJs of different styles of music would offer more variety and the chance for the ever burgeoning UK dance music scene to flourish."

Gordon pitched the idea of a UK-based dance music show, with an emphasis on house, that show-cased different DJs and styles of music and offer an outlet for UK dance music.

The first show, fronted by Gordon's protege Tong, was broadcast on 11 January 1991, produced by Gordon and aired from 7.30pm to 10.00pm. The show was subject to scheduling adjustments over the subsequent fifteen years, varying in duration from 2 hours to 3.5 hours, broadcast within the time frame from 6.00pm to 10.00pm. The show was the first BBC production to broadcast live from Ibiza, Spain. Gordon left the show in 2003, when it changed to a three-hour length. In addition, a one-hour Sunday edition of the programme was broadcast at 7.00pm from April 1992 to April 1993, called "The Essential Selection - Part 2".

From 29 September 2006 to at least 2013, the show was entitled simply Pete Tong (although the feature "Essential New Tune" remains), and is currently broadcast from 10.00pm to 1.00am. The 500th show was broadcast on 23/24 April 2010, featuring Tong on the Friday night, and Tong plus DJs Sasha and Richie Hawtin live from Circus nightclub in Liverpool.

In September 2020, the show changed time slot to 10:00pm each Friday night. It is usually pre-recorded by Pete Tong from his Los Angeles studio where he currently resides.

From October 2020, the show acts as the drivetime show on BBC Radio 1 Dance, airing 4pm–6pm Monday to Thursday.

== Format ==
A regular feature of the show is Tong's designation of one track as the Essential New Tune of the week. Often, the track in question may be only available in white label releases at the time. This is a significant accolade within the dance music community.

== International versions ==
Versions of the show are exported outside of the UK. In Vancouver, Canada, the show, under its original name aired Saturday evenings from 8:00pm–10:00pm on The Beat 94.5FM, but was taken off air from Summer of 2008. In China, the show is aired Saturday evenings from 10:00pm–12:00pm (2:00pm – 4:00pm UTC) on CRI Hit FM under its original name from 5 May 2012. So it can be listened to at Beijing (FM 88.7 MHz) and Shanghai (FM 87.9 MHz) Evolution with Pete Tong on Evolution (radio network) was distributed by Premiere Networks in a 2 hour format, from June 2013 to December 2016.

== Discography ==
List of Essential Selection albums, the chart numbers written next to the titles are their entry in the UK Compilation Chart The limited editions of the albums had to chart separately from the standard editions due to chart regulations. The limited editions are distinguished from the standard editions by a different cover and a third disc (standard editions have two discs).

- Pete Tong Essential Selection Summer 1997 (1997) (#4) (Orange cover)
- Pete Tong Essential Selection Winter 1997 (1997) (#10) (Light blue cover)
- Pete Tong Essential Selection Spring 1998 (#4) (Green cover)
- Pete Tong Essential Selection Summer 1998 (1998) (#4) (Red cover of strawberries)
- Pete Tong Essential Selection Summer 1998 (1998) (Limited Edition) (#2) (Yellow cover of strawberries, CD3 is Twelve Ibiza Classics mixed by Paul Oakenfold)
- Essential Selection '98 Tong/Oakenfold (1998) (#13) (Orange cover of oranges)
- Essential Selection '98 Tong/Oakenfold (1998) (Limited Edition) (#11) (Purple cover of tinted oranges, CD3 is mixed by Carl Cox)
- Carl Cox Non Stop 98/01 (1998) (#8) (Subtitled An Essential Album)
- Pete Tong Essential Selection Spring 1999 (1999) (#13) (Cover of gold, green and purple easter eggs)
- Pete Tong Essential Selection Spring 1999 (1999) (Limited Edition) (#3) (Gold cover of easter eggs, CD3 is Hacienda Classics mixed by Graeme Park)
- Pete Tong Essential Selection Ibiza 1999 (1999) (#11) (Cover of blue, red and yellow buckets and spades)
- Pete Tong Essential Selection Ibiza 1999 (1999) (#7) (Cover of green, purple and viridian bucket and spades, CD3 is mixed by DJ Pippi)
- Essential Millennium (1999) (#10) (Mixed by Pete Tong/Fatboy Slim/Paul Oakenfold)
- Pete Tong Essential Selection Spring 2000 (2000) (#8)
- Essential Selection Ibiza 2000 Mixed by Pete Tong (2000) (#11)
- Carl Cox Non Stop 2000 (2000) (#13)
- Essential Selection Vol. One Mixed by: Fatboy Slim & Paul Oakenfold (2000) (did not chart)
- Essential Selection Presents The Clubber's Bible (2000) (Pete Tong)
- Essential Selection Presents The Clubber's Bible II: The Second Coming (2001) (Pete Tong)
- Essential Selection Presents The Clubber's Bible Winter 2002 (2001) (Pete Tong)
- Essential Selection Presents The Clubber's Bible Winter 2003 (2002)
- Essential Selection Pete Tong (2003) (did not chart)

== See also ==
- Essential Mix – BBC Radio 1 radio show
