= Ibiza Classics =

Compilation album by Pete Tong with Jules Buckley and the Heritage Orchestra
- Released: 1 December 2017
- Recorded: 2017
- Genre: House; Balearic beat; classical crossover
- Label: Universal
- Producer: Pete Tong; Jules Buckley; Mark Ralph; Dennis White; Chris Wheeler

Pete Tong chronology
Classic House (2016)	Ibiza Classics (2017)	Chilled Classics (2019)

Ibiza Classics is a compilation album by Pete Tong with Jules Buckley and the Heritage Orchestra. The follow-up to Classic House (2016), it was released through Universal Music on 1 December 2017. It has sold 97,663 copies as of March 2018.

== Track listing ==
1. "Clubbed to Death"
2. "Galvanize"
3. "Body Language"
4. "Killer"
5. "Sing It Back"
6. "You Don't Know Me"
7. "Running/Finally"
8. "Unfinished Sympathy"
9. "Rej/Man with the Red Face/Yeke Yeke"
10. "La Ritournelle"
11. "Promised Land"
12. "Grey"
13. "Out of Space"
14. "One"
15. "You Got the Love"

== Charts and certifications ==
=== Weekly charts ===
Chart (2017)	Peak position
Scottish Albums (OCC)	19
UK Albums (OCC)	11
UK Dance Albums (OCC)	1

=== Certifications ===
Region	Certification	Certified units/sales
United Kingdom (BPI)	Gold	100,000^{‡}
^{‡} Sales+streaming figures based on certification alone.

== See also ==
- List of UK Dance Albums Chart number ones of 2017
- List of UK Dance Albums Chart number ones of 2018
