= Heritage Orchestra =

British orchestra

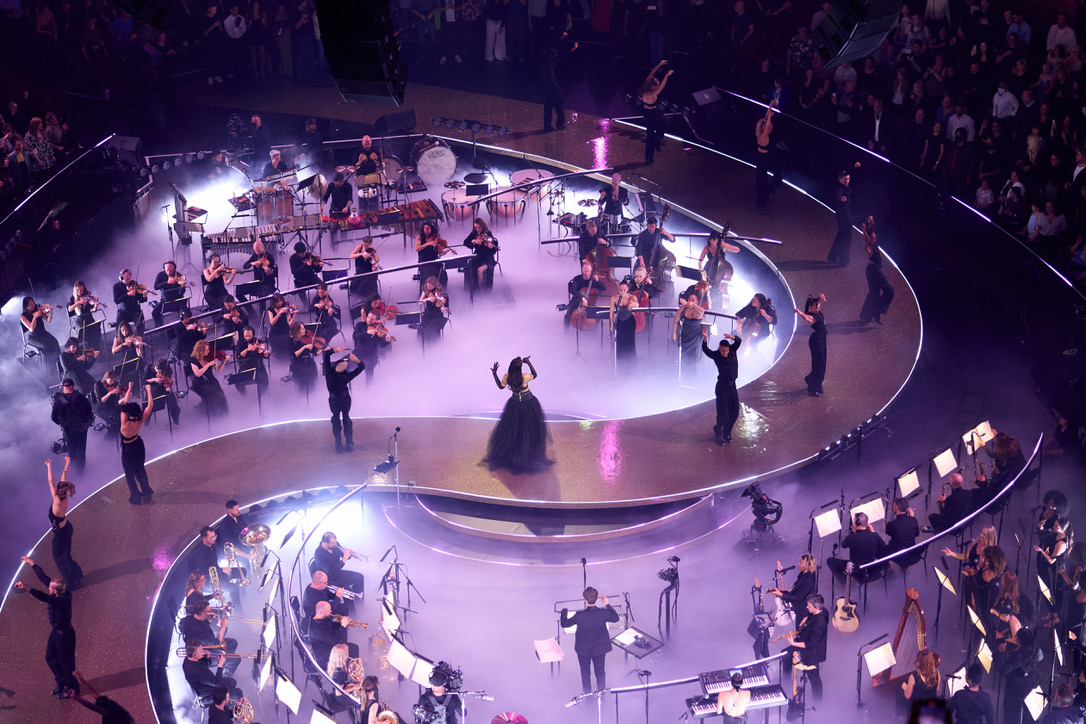
The Heritage Orchestra & Dua Lipa at the Royal Albert Hall

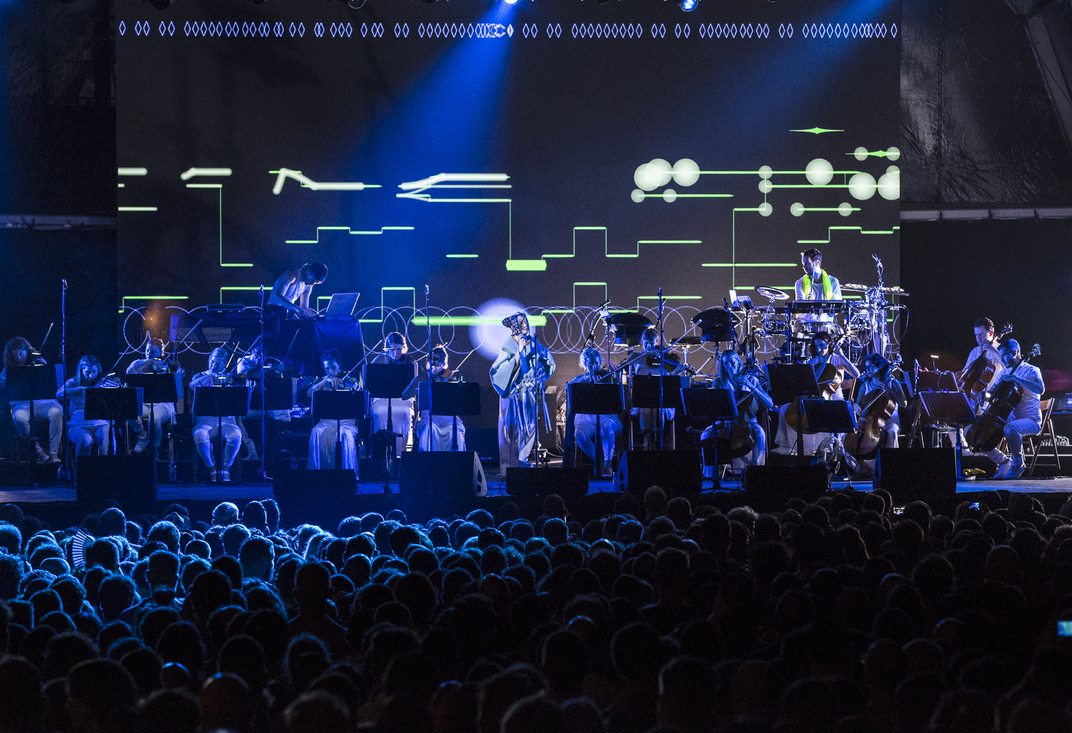
Bjork & The Heritage Orchestra join forces to present her album Vulnicura throughout Europe

The Heritage Orchestra is a British orchestra founded in 2004 under the artistic direction of Chris Wheeler. The orchestra performs a mix of styles and genres, with a catalogue of studio and performance projects in both experimental and popular music.

The orchestra ranges between 25 and 75 members, and often combine electronics, performers, and visuals, and have performed internationally in venues such as the Sydney Opera House, Emirates Palace, the Hollywood Bowl, and regularly tour throughout the UK to major concert halls and large-scale arenas, including the O2 Arena and the Royal Albert Hall in London.

In 2010, the Heritage Orchestra was nominated in the 9th Independent Music Awards and won the Contemporary Classical Album award for their performance of Gabriel Prokofiev's "Concerto for Turntables and Orchestra" along with DJ Yoda. In 2015 the orchestra toured Europe with Björk leading to a live recording of Vulnicura. In 2017 the orchestra reached number one in the UK Album Charts with BBC Radio 1 DJ Pete Tong and their album Classic House. In 2023 they performed at the Royal Albert Hall with Raye for My 21st Century Symphony (Live at the Royal Albert Hall) In 2024 The Heritage Orchestra collaborated with Dua Lipa, providing their full orchestral production and arranging team for Dua Lipa Live from the Royal Albert Hall, later broadcast on ITV entitled An Evening with Dua Lipa.

The Heritage Orchestra has worked with various conductors including Tom Richards, Ben Foster, and Jules Buckley (who left the orchestra in 2022).

== Past live performances and collaborations ==
Past live performances and collaborations (most recent first) by the Heritage Orchestra include:

- The Heritage Orchestra accompanied Rosalía during her Lux Tour in 2026.
- Rosalía and Björk performed "Berghain" at the Brit Awards 2026 featuring the Heritage Orchestra.
- Dua Lipa and the Heritage Orchestra - Live from the Royal Albert Hall on 17 October 2024
- Nas and the Heritage Orchestra at the Royal Albert Hall on 15 and November 2024 celebrating 30 years of the album Illmatic.
- Raye and the Heritage Orchestra with the Flames Collective on 26 September 2023 at the Royal Albert Hall and at The O2 Arena on 15 March 2024 performing My 21st Century Symphony, a reimagining of RAYE's album My 21st Century Blues.
- London Community Gospel Choir and the Heritage Orchestra at the Royal Albert Hall - December 2022, 2023, 2024
- Seu Jorge and the Heritage Orchestra at Hammersmith Apollo on 11 February 2019
- Ibiza Classics with Pete Tong and the Heritage Orchestra - UK arena tours between 2016 to 2022 including Birmingham Arena, The O2 Arena Manchester Arena, Cardiff Arena, Liverpool Arena, Belfast Arena, Glasgow Arena, with additional shows at the Hollywood Bowl on 10 November 2017, Sydney Meyer Music Bowl on 3 November 2017
- Jamie Cullum and the Heritage Orchestra at the BBC Proms at the Royal Albert Hall on 11 August 2016
- Anna Calvi and the Heritage Orchestra at Edinburgh International Festival on 20 August 2015
- BBC Radio 1 "Ibiza Prom" on 29 July 2015
- Sparks and the Heritage Orchestra at the Barbican Centre on 20 January 2015
- Anna Calvi and the Heritage Orchestra at St John's Church, Hackney on 13 December 2014
- These New Puritans and the Heritage Orchestra at the Barbican Centre on 17 April 2014
- The xx and the Heritage Orchestra]] on BBC Radio 1 with Zane Lowe
- Tim Exile and the Heritage Orchestra (Warp Records) at Village Underground performing the Bardo EP on 5 September 2013
- The Light Surgeons SuperEverything UK Tour
- "Live_Transmission: Joy Division Reworked" with Scanner and visual artist Matt Watkins at the Brighton Festival on 18 May 2012, later performed at the Sydney Opera House on 29 May 2013, then throughout the UK in September and October 2013
- SBTRKT on BBC Live Lounge, Maida Vale Studios, on 12 March 2012
- Bryce Dessner & Aaron Dessner performing The Long Count at the Barbican Centre, London, on 2, 3 and 4 February 2012
- The Leisure Society at the Barbican Centre London on 8 December 2011
- Tim Minchin and the Heritage Orchestra UK Tour in 2011 (11 May). Also appearing on his live DVD and CD Tim Minchin and the Heritage Orchestra, released November 2011
- Jamie Cullum and the Heritage Orchestra at the BBC Proms at the Royal Albert Hall, London, on 26 August 2010, and also 11 August 2016
- John Cale and the Heritage Orchestra performing Paris 1919 at the Royal Festival Hall on 5 March 2010 and the Theatre Royal, Norwich on 14 May 2010
- Spiritualized and the Heritage Orchestra performing Ladies and Gentlemen We Are Floating in Space at the Royal Festival Hall London on 13 October 2009 and on 9 May 2010 at the festival All Tomorrows Parties
- Bill Drummond of The KLF – recording and deleting The17 on 13 October 2008
- Vangelis’s Blade Runner soundtrack created for Massive Attack’s Meltdown Festival at the Royal Festival Hall on 17 June 2008 and the Sydney Opera House on 26 May 2013 at Vivid Live
- The Bays and the Heritage Orchestra, UK Tour funded by Arts Council England via Music Beyond The Mainstream with subsequent shows at the Tower of London (Sept 2009) and Womad Festival 2010
- DJ Yoda and the Heritage Orchestra at Scala, London, on 26 July 2007 performing the world premier of Gabriel Prokofiev's Concerto for Turntables, also including a performance with Plaid of Warp Records
- Deodato and the Heritage Orchestra at Hackney Empire on 21 July 2006
- Montreux Jazz Festival appearance for an evening organised by Gilles Peterson in July 2005

== Discography (most recent first) ==
- Dua Lipa – Live from the Royal Albert Hall (Warner, 2024)
- Raye – My 21st Century Symphony (Live at the Royal Albert Hall) (Human Re Sources, 2023)
- The Breaks (Decca, 2021)
- Pete Tong with the Heritage Orchestra conducted by Jules Buckley – Chilled Classics (Universal 2019)
- Pete Tong with the Heritage Orchestra conducted by Jules Buckley – Ibiza Classics (Polydor, Universal 2017)
- Pete Tong with the Heritage Orchestra conducted by Jules Buckley – Classic House (Polydor, Universal 2016) reaching No.1 in the UK Albums Chart
- Tim Minchin and the Heritage Orchestra (Laughing Stock Productions, 2015)
- Unkle and the Heritage Orchestra Presents Variation of a Theme Live at the Union Chapel (Surrender All, 2014)
- Emeli Sandé - Clown (Virgin 2012) & Daddy (EMI 2011)
- Jonathan Jeremiah – A Solitary Man (Island 2011)
- Professor Green - Read All About It (Virgin 2011) - UK Number 1
- Unkle – Where Did The Night Fall (Surrender All 2010)
- Black Water Transit – Film Score (2009) directed by Tony Kaye
- The Heritage Orchestra Feat. DJ Yoda – G.Prokofiev Concerto for Turntables & Orchestra (Nonclassical 2009) – winner of 9th Independent Music Awards and won the Contemporary Classical Album category
- Pete Lawrie – In the End EP (Island Records 2009)
- Razorlight – Hostage of Love (Vertigo 2008)
- Arctic Monkeys – Leave Before the Lights Come On (Domino Records 2006)
- The Heritage Orchestra (Brownswood Recordings, 2006)
