= Jules Buckley =

English conductor and composer (born 1980)

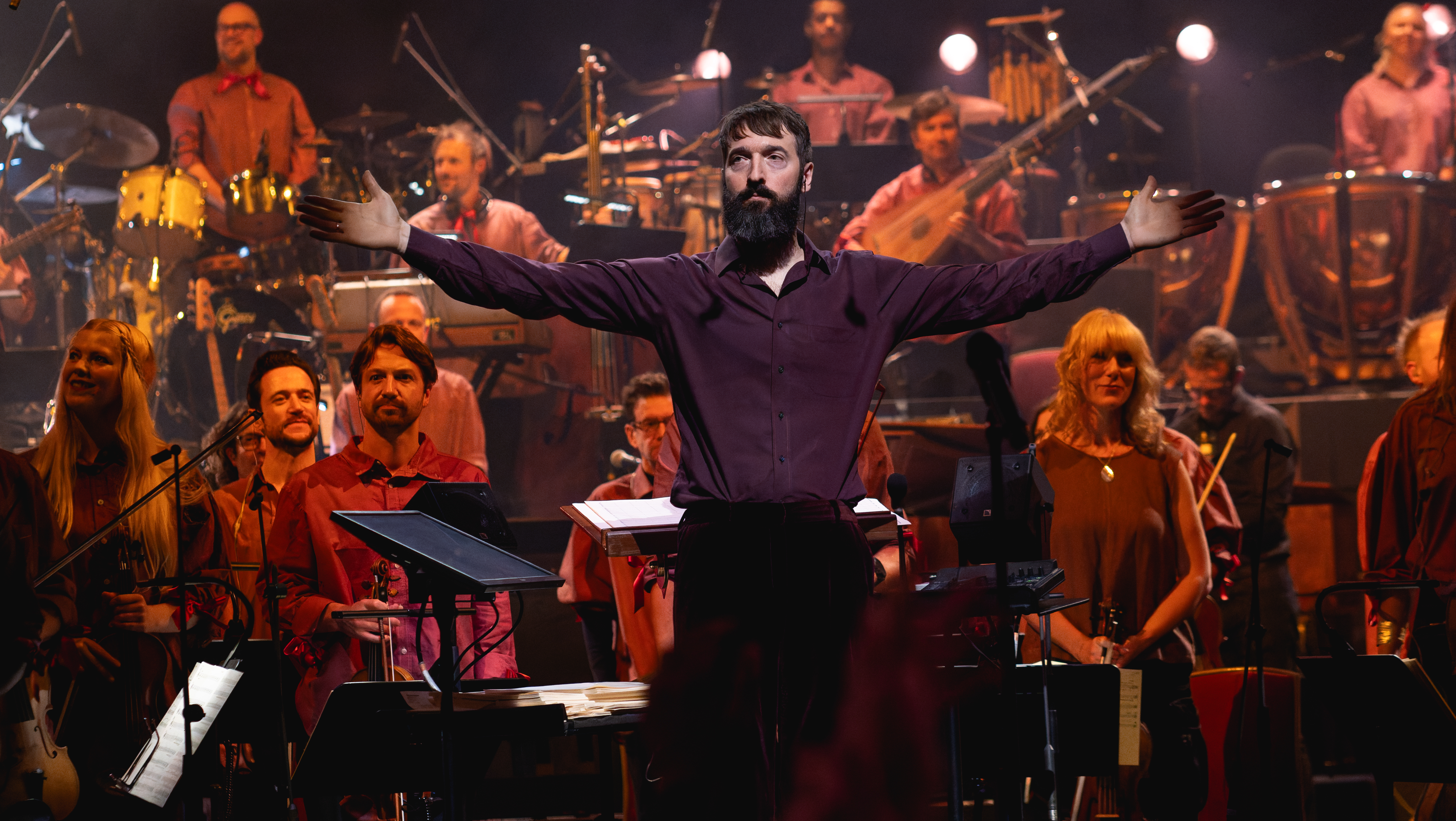
- Buckley performing in 2024

Background information
- Born: Julian Buckley; 8 January 1980 (age 46); Aylesbury, Buckinghamshire, England
- Genres: Eclectic; classical; folk; jazz; film score
- Occupations: Arranger; conductor; composer
- Member of: Metropole Orkest, The Heritage Orchestra
- Website: www.julesbuckley.com

Julian "Jules" Buckley (born 8 January 1980) is an English conductor, composer, and arranger.

== Career ==
In 2004, Buckley and producer/manager Chris Wheeler co-founded the Heritage Orchestra, with the intention of featuring an orchestra in a music club setting. In 2008, Buckley became principal guest conductor of the Metropole Orkest, a jazz and eclectic music orchestra based in Hilversum, in the Netherlands, and chief conductor from 2013. In 2020, he became Creative Artist-in-Residence with the BBC Symphony Orchestra and stood in as presenter of the BBC Radio 3 programme Classical Fix, in place of Clemency Burton-Hill, who suffered a brain haemorrhage in January 2020.

== Collaborations ==
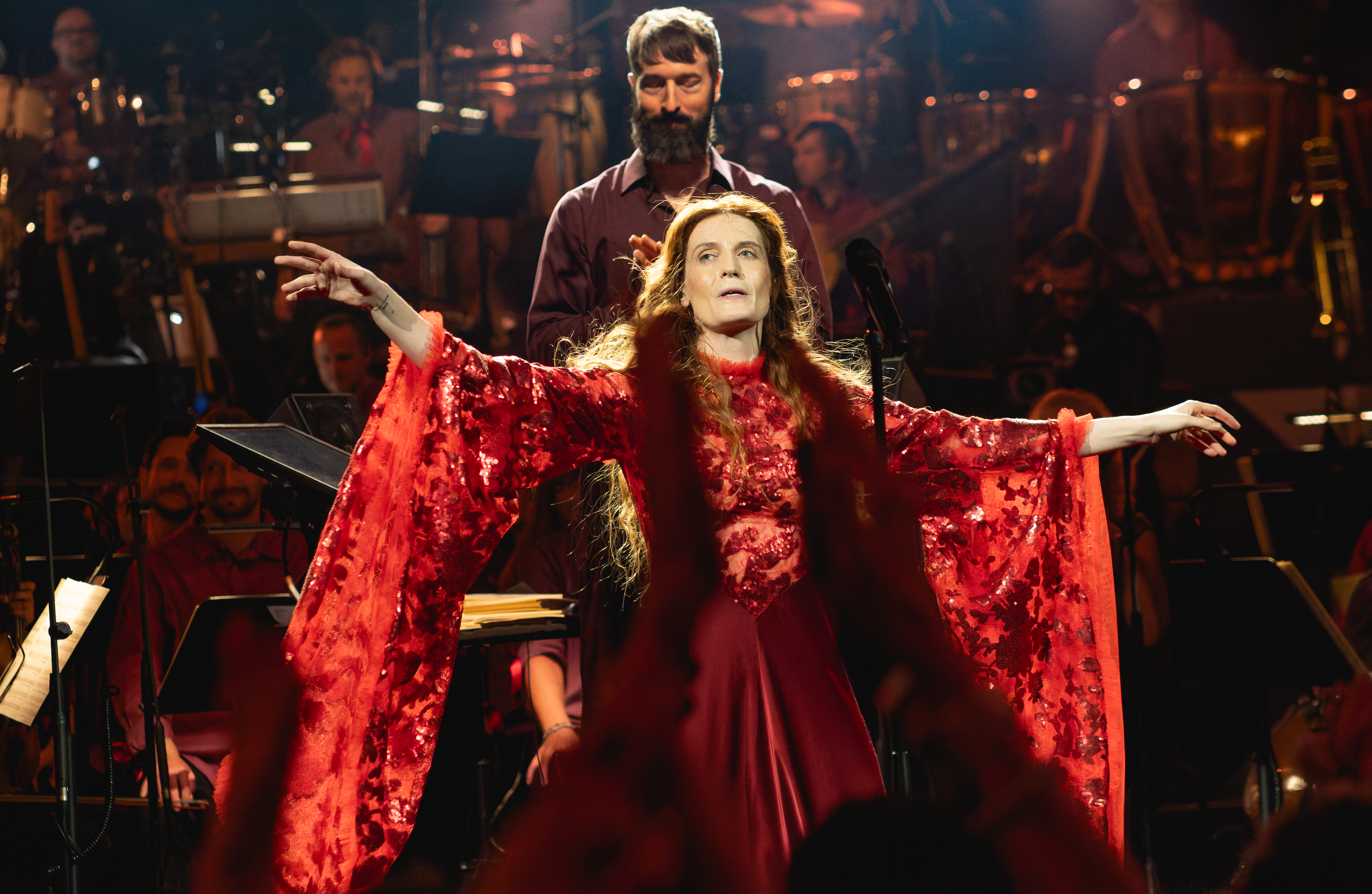
Buckley (behind) performing with Florence Welch and her band, Florence and the Machine, as part of BBC Proms in 2024

Buckley has worked with the WDR Big Band; José James and the Royal Concertgebouw Orchestra; Patrick Watson and the Orchestre National d'Île de France; and arranged and conducted Caro Emerald's album The Shocking Miss Emerald and Jacob Collier's album Djesse Vol. 1. Other collaborations have included projects with Gregory Porter; Tori Amos; Markus Stockhausen; Emilie-Claire Barlow; Michael Kiwanuka; Louis Cole; Jonathan Jeremiah; Basement Jaxx; Massive Attack; Arctic Monkeys; John Cale; Paul Weller; Emeli Sandé; The Cinematic Orchestra; Jamie Cullum; Cory Wong; Beardyman; Cory Henry; Snarky Puppy; Becca Stevens; Andrea Motis and Dizzee Rascal.

== Awards ==
In February 2016, the Snarky Puppy album Sylva, featuring Buckley and the Metropole Orkest, won a Grammy Award for Best Contemporary Instrumental Album. At the end of 2016, Classic House with Pete Tong and the Heritage Orchestra reached No. 1 in the Album Charts. In 2020, the song "All Night Long" by Jacob Collier, featuring Take 6 and the Metropole Orkest, won an award for Best Arrangement, Instrumental and Vocal at the 62nd Grammy Awards.

In 2018, Buckley and Metropole Orkest were awarded the Bremer Musikfest-Preis in special recognition of their contribution to the success of Musikfest Bremen.

== Notable recent performances ==
- August 2016: BBC Prom 49, with the Metropole Orkest, celebrating the music of Quincy Jones.
- February 2017: National Symphony Orchestra, with Snarky Puppy at the Kennedy Center, Washington DC.
- August 2018: BBC Proms with the Heritage Orchestra for a late-night Prom "New York Now", celebrating the changing soundscape of New York and featuring artists from that city, including Hercules and Love Affair.
- June 2019: "Soundtrack of the 80s with Quincy Jones", with the Metropole Orkest at London's O2 arena.
- August 2019: BBC Prom 45, with the Metropole Orkest in a homage to Nina Simone, with Ledisi and Lisa Fischer.
- September 2019: BBC Prom 64 with the Heritage Orchestra and the Soul Mavericks, featuring Terra & Eddie, Sunni and Lagaet.
- February 2020: Seattle Symphony Orchestra, "The Best of Quincy Jones", at Benaroya Hall, Seattle.
- February 2020: BBC Symphony Orchestra, featuring Lianne La Havas, at the Barbican Centre, London.
- August 2021: BBC Proms, with BBC Symphony Orchestra, featuring Moses Sumney.
- September 2024: BBC Proms, with his orchestra and Florence and The Machine for "Symphony of Lungs"

== Personal life ==
Buckley was born and grew up in Aylesbury, Buckinghamshire in the UK. He is the son of Keith Buckley (a doctor) and Joan Buckley, and attended Aylesbury Grammar School. Buckley started playing the trumpet aged nine at the Aylesbury Music Centre. He played in the Aylesbury Music Centre Dance Band and went on to study trumpet at the Guildhall School of Music in London, before changing to classical composition. His initial ambition was to be a jazz trumpeter, but at the Guildhall School his interests grew to include musical composition and conducting. He lives in Berlin, Germany.

== Discography ==
Year	Production	Cooperation	Label
2006	The Heritage Orchestra (CD)	Heritage Orchestra	Brownswood Recordings
2006	Secret Garden	Natalie Williams	East Side Records
2006	The Beauty Room	Kirk Degiorgio	Peacefrog
2006	Baby, I'm Yours (Single)	Arctic Monkeys	Domino Recording Co
2007	If You've Found This it's Probably Too Late	Arctic Monkeys	Domino Recording Co
2007	Smoke and Mirrors	Tom Richards Orchestra	Candid Records
2007	Sky Breaks	Heritage orchestra	Brownswood Recordings
2007	Brianstorm	Arctic Monkeys	Domino Recording Co
2008	Live at the Albert Hall	The Cinematic Orchestra	Ninja Tune
2008	Junkyard Gods	Two Banks of Four	Sonar Kollectiv
2008	Slipway Fires	Razorlight	Mercury
2008	Wake Me 5.30	Two Banks of Four	Sonar Kollectiv
2008	Black Symphony (CD)	Within Temptation and Metropole Orkest	Roadrunner Records
2009	Blackbud	Blackbud	Independiente
2009	Heimspiel	Die Fantastischen Vier	Sony BMG
2009	Utopia – An Acoustic Night at the Theatre	Within Temptation	Roadrunner
2009	Black Water Transit (movie)	Directed by Tony Kaye	Capitol Films
2009	Heritage Orchestra Feat. DJ Yoda Prokofiev Concerto for Turntables and Orchestra	Heritage Orchestra feat DJ Yoda	NonClassical
2010	What's a Guy Gotta Do	Jonathan Jeremiah	Island
2010	Moke & Metropole Orkest (CD)	Moke and Metropole Orkest	Pias
2010	Alive 'till I'm Dead (CD)	Professor Green	Virgin Records
2010	The Answer EP	Unkle	Surrender All
2010	Where Did the Night Fall	Unkle	Surrender All
2010	El Encuentro (CD)	Dino Saluzzi, Anja Lechner and Metropole Orkest	ECM
2011	At Your Inconvenience (CD)	Professor Green	Virgin
2011	A Solitary Man	Jonathan Jeremiah	Island
2011	Tangent	Trish Clowes	Basho
2011	A Little Brighter	Pete Lawrie	Island
2011	Basement Jaxx vs. Metropole Orkest (CD)	Basement Jaxx and Metropole Orkest	XL Recordings
2011	Tim Minchin and the Heritage Orchestra – Live at The Royal Albert Hall (DVD)	Tim Minchin and Heritage Orchestra	Universal Pictures UK
2012	No Beginning No End (CD)	Jose James	Blue Note
2012	In Motion No.1 (CD)	The Cinematic Orchestra	Piccadilly Records
2012	Adventures in Your Own Backyard (CD)	Patrick Watson	Secret City Records
2012	Our Version of Events (CD)	Emeli Sandé	Virgin
2012	Through the Night	Ren Harvieu	Island
2012	Gold Dust (CD)	Jonathan Jeremiah	Universal
2012	The Beauty Room II		Far Out Recordings
2012	Home Again (CD)	Michael Kiwanuka and Metropole Orkest	Polydor
2012	Clown	Emeli Sandé	Virgin
2012	See You on the Ice	Carice van Houten	EMI
2012	Flavor (CD)	Tori Amos	Deutsche Grammophon
2012	Gold Dust	Tori Amos	Deutsche Grammophon
2012	No Beginning No End	José James	Blue Note Records
2012	Tangled Up	Caro Emerald	Grandmono
2013	The Shocking Miss Emerald (CD)	Caro Emerald	Grand Mono
2014	Fireflies (feat. Tom Parker)	Richard Rawson	Island
2014	Laura Mvula and Metropole Orkest	Laura Mvula	RCA
2014	Growing up in Public	Professor Green	Virgin
2015	Sylva (CD)	Snarky Puppy and Metropole Orkest	Impulse! Records
2015	Clear Day	Emilie-Claire Barlow and Metropole Orkest	Empress Music Group
2016	Classic House	Pete Tong and Heritage Orchestra	Universal
2017	Ibiza Classics	Pete Tong and Heritage Orchestra	Universal
2018	Djesse Vol. 1 (CD)	Jacob Collier and Metropole Orkest	Hajanga Records
2018	What Heat	Bokanté and Metropole Orkest	Real World
2019	Chilled Classics	Pete Tong and Heritage Orchestra	Decca Records
2019	Melkweg	Jameszoo and Metropole Orkest	Brainfeeder
2023	This New Noise	Public Service Broadcasting (band) and the BBC Symphony Orchestra	Test Card Recordings
2024	nothing	Louis Cole and Metropole Orkest	Brainfeeder
2024	Starship Syncopation	Cory Wong and Metropole Orkest	Roundwound
2026	Kiss All The Time. Disco, Occasionally	Harry Styles	Erskine Records, Columbia Records
2026	With Every Breath I Take	Cécile McLorin Salvant	Nonesuch Records
