= Evolution (radio network) =

American online radio station

- Type: Radio network
- Country: United States
- Availability: National, through online and HD Radio affiliates
- Owner: iHeartMedia, Inc.
- Launch date: November 19, 2012
- Official website: https://evolution.iheart.com/

Evolution is a radio station platform on iHeartRadio and iHeartMedia's HD2 & HD3 radio and FM translators across the United States that plays commercial free dance/EDM music 24/7. The primary station for the platform is WFLZ-HD3 Tampa.

== History ==
Evolution was launched on November 19, 2012, as a platform on iHeartRadio, replacing the previous Dance platform Club Phusion, which was phased out on March 31, 2013. The format and its content was programmed by legendary British DJ, producer, record executive, and radio personality Pete Tong, who also did an air shift until his departure in 2017. After the platform was launched, it would be adopted as the first over the air format at Clear Channel's newly acquired property WEDX-Lynn/Boston in December 2012, where it would last until June 2014 when it flipped to Country. Since then the format has expanded to Clear Channel's other properties as a HD2 sub channel or as an FM translator with customized liners for each market.

As of June 2019, Evolution's HD2 and HD3 affiliates were replaced by iHeart's "Pride Radio" format targeting the LGBTQ community. The expansion was in response to rival Entercom's launching of the similar-formatted Channel Q platform. At the same time, Evolution 101.7 has since stopped broadcasting and it moved Evolution's flagship station from KBKS-HD2/Tacoma to KZZP-HD2/Mesa (its Adult Top 40 sister KMXP already airs Pride on their HD2 sub channel). It has since moved Evolution's flagship station to WFLZ-HD3 Tampa when Evolution 93.3 stopped broadcasting as an individual station.

== Programming ==
A majority of Evolution's programming tends to feature a heavy amount of EDM product but at times will play other Dance genres and an occasional classic. During the pre-midnight (10pm to 1am Sunday-Thursday) and weekend hours mix shows from influential performers in the world of EDM/Dance are featured.

In addition to being available 24/7, a supplemental syndicated weekly program companion, Evolution with Pete Tong, was available to Top 40/CHR and Rhythmic stations in the United States and in key countries worldwide, distributed by Premiere Networks in a 2-hour format. The program ended its run in December 2016.

In January 2018, Evolution introduced a new countdown program, America's Dance 30, hosted by Evolution PD Brian Fink. The program countdown the 30 most popular Dance/Electronic songs based on airplay from Dance-centric radio stations. The program airs twice on weekends on Evolution, along with two other internet stations, and Miami, FL's WZFL.

Other programs include UMF Radio, CYB3RPVNK Radio with R3hab, Hexagon Radio with Don Diablo, and Jacked Radio with Afrojack.

== Affiliates ==
=== Current affiliates ===
The following station carries Evolution programming as an HD Sub-channel. Evolution can also be heard on the iHeartRadio app:

- WFLZ-HD3: Tampa

=== Former affiliates ===
- WFLZ-HD2: Tampa (As Evolution 93.3, broadcasting as an individual station) (switched to Pride Radio in response to rival Entercom's similar-formatted Channel Q. The format moved to a new HD3 subchannel)
- WFLZ-HD3: Tampa (As Evolution 93.3, broadcasting as an individual station)
- KYLD-HD2: San Francisco
- KZZP-HD2: Mesa (former Primary Channel heard on iHeartRadio; reporter on Billboard’s Dance/Mix Show Airplay panel)
- KBKS-HD2: Tacoma (former Primary Channel heard on iHeartRadio; reporter on Billboard’s Dance/Mix Show Airplay panel)
- KIIS-HD2: Los Angeles
- WEDX Lynn (As Evolution 101.7, broadcasting as an individual station) (switched to country)
- WBWL-HD2: Lynn (As Evolution 101.7, broadcasting as an individual station) (switched to Pride Radio in response to rival Entercom's similar-formatted Channel Q platform)
- WXKS-HD2: Medford (WEDX simulcast) (since switched to WBZ (AM) simulcast)
- KHJZ-HD2:/K256AS Honolulu (Ad Evolution 99.1, broadcasting as an individual station) (since switched to rhythmic contemporary)
- WNRW-HD2: Prospect
- KPTT-HD2: Denver (switched to a simulcast of KBPI. The format moved to a new HD3 subchannel)
- KZCH-HD2: Derby
