= Evolution Beatport Show with Pete Tong =

Radio show

Evolution with Pete Tong
- Other names: Evolution Beatport Show
- Genre: Electronic dance music
- Running time: 2 hours
- Country of origin: United States
- Language(s): English
- Syndicates: Premiere Networks
- Hosted by: Pete Tong
- Starring: Pete Tong; Various guest DJs
- Created by: iHeartMedia; Pete Tong
- Original release: June 2013 – December 2016
- Website: www.petetong.com/evolution

Evolution with Pete Tong, also known as the Evolution Beatport Show, was a radio show created and hosted by British DJ, record producer, and radio personality Pete Tong. The show, which aired on iHeartRadio's digital radio platform as well as on iHeartMedia's HD2 and FM radio in the United States, was a two-hour format. It featured electronic dance music with songs from the Beatport charts as well as selected mixes from various guest DJs from around the world. The show aired on select stations in the United States, including Z100 in New York, 102.7 KIIS-FM in Los Angeles, and 103.5 KISS-FM in Chicago, as well as other countries around the world.

== See also ==
- Evolution (radio network)
