= Classic House =

Compilation album by Pete Tong with Jules Buckley and the Heritage Orchestra
- Released: 25 November 2016
- Recorded: 2016
- Genre: House, classical crossover
- Label: Universal
- Producer: Pete Tong

Pete Tong chronology
The Pete Tong Collection (2013)	Classic House (2016)	Ibiza Classics (2017)

Classic House is a compilation album by English DJ Pete Tong with Jules Buckley and the Heritage Orchestra, released on 25 November 2016. It reached number 1 on the UK Albums Chart, marking Tong's first ever number 1 album.

== Track listing ==
No.	Title	Original artist(s)	Length
1.	"Right Here, Right Now"	Fatboy Slim	4:15
2.	"Pjanoo"	Eric Prydz	3:08
3.	"Lola's Theme" (featuring Cookie)	The Shapeshifters	3:20
4.	"Children"	Robert Miles	2:32
5.	"9 PM (Till I Come)"	ATB	2:50
6.	"Go"	Moby	4:31
7.	"Your Love" (featuring Jamie Principle)	Jamie Principle	4:51
8.	"Good Life" (featuring Katy B)	Inner City	4:44
9.	"Belfast"	Orbital	3:09
10.	"Smokebelch II"	The Sabres of Paradise	2:03
11.	"Where Love Lives"	Alison Limerick	4:36
12.	"Rachel's Song"	Vangelis	2:13
13.	"Porcelain"	Moby	3:11
14.	"Waiting All Night" (featuring Ella Eyre)	Rudimental	3:36
15.	"Insomnia"	Faithless	4:26
16.	"Strings of Life / Knights of the Jaguar / Nightmare / Café del Mar"	Rhythim Is Rhythim, DJ Rolando, Brainbug, Energy 52	9:02
17.	"Feel the Love" (featuring John Newman)	Rudimental	5:57
Total length:			68:24

== Charts and certifications ==
=== Weekly charts ===
Chart (2017)	Peak position
Australian Albums (ARIA)	20
Scottish Albums (OCC)	1
UK Albums (OCC)	1
UK Dance Albums (OCC)	1

=== Year-end charts ===
Chart (2016)	Position
UK Albums (OCC)	91
Chart (2017)	Position
UK Albums (OCC)	49

=== Certifications ===
Region	Certification	Certified units/sales
United Kingdom (BPI)	Gold	207,433
