= Pete Tong =

English DJ (born 1960)

Pete Tong MBE
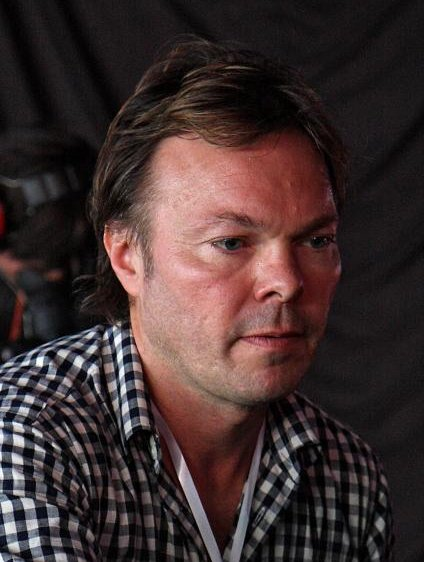
- Tong at the Glastonbury Festival in 2009

Background information
- Born: Peter Michael Tong; 30 July 1960 (age 65); Dartford, Kent, England
- Genres: Electronic; Balearic beat; house
- Occupations: Disc jockey; record producer; radio presenter
- Years active: 1981–present
- Website: petetong.com

Peter Michael Tong MBE (born 30 July 1960) is an English DJ who works for BBC Radio 1. He is the host of programmes such as Essential Mix and Essential Selection on the radio service, which can be heard through Internet radio streams, for his record label FFRR Records and for his own performances at nightclubs and music festivals. Tong has also worked as a record producer and is regarded as the "global ambassador for electronic music."

The phrase "It's all gone Pete Tong", where the name is used as rhyming slang for "it's all gone wrong", was reputedly coined by Paul Oakenfold in late 1987 in an article about acid house called "Bermondsey Goes Balearic" for Terry Farley and Pete Heller's Boys Own fanzine. It's All Gone Pete Tong is also the title of a 2004 film which portrays a fictional DJ's experiences as he realizes he is becoming deaf. Tong appears briefly in the film. It is also the name Tong has adopted for his club night at the nightclub Pacha in Ibiza and his nightly radio programme in the United States on iHeartRadio's "Evolution" EDM format platform.

In 2008, Tong was involved with organizing the International Music Summit in Ibiza, an event that has become an annual fixture (the 2016 Summit was held during 25–27 May). In 2017, Tong won Radio Show of the Year at the Electronic Music Awards for "The Essential Collection".

== Biography ==
=== Early life ===
Tong was born in Dartford, Kent in 1960 and was educated at King's School, Rochester, Kent. Tong is a supporter of Arsenal F.C.

Tong's original musical interest was in drumming, but he soon moved on to DJing. He played his first public gig at a friend's wedding at age 15. While at school he and a couple of friends earned some extra money by promoting a couple of local bands and booking halls for gigs. He also worked as part of the Kent "Soul Mafia" bringing soul weekenders to seaside towns such as Caister-on-Sea and Prestatyn. In his early years Tong was heavily influenced by the late DJ Froggy. The first album he bought was The Slider by T-Rex (1972).

After leaving school, Tong set up a mobile disco based in a Ford Transit van, but he soon started his own club in Baker Street called Family Function. He also booked bands for an alternative night, the first of which was the then unknown Culture Club. Tong originally performed as a DJ using the name "Kickstart Roadshow" and then later "OHMS Roadshow" with an extensive sound system.

Later, he became a DJ and promoter at the Kings Lodge club in West Kingsdown. Later moving venue to the Hill Top, also in West Kingsdown, he was responsible for breaking classics such as Lonnie Liston Smith's "Expansions" and Ritchie Cole's "Groovin on a New York Afternoon".

In 1979, Tong became an advertising sales assistant for Blues & Soul magazine. After a year he also contributed some reviews, gossip and sales charts, which continued until 1983. He left Blues & Soul to join London Records as an A&R manager. Through his connections in London Records, Tong was exposed to the newly emerging house music sound from Chicago. In 1986, Tong organised a compilation album, The House Sound of Chicago, Vol. 1, the first British release to gather and expose this genre.

Along with Jules Buckley and the Heritage Orchestra, Tong was part of the 2015 BBC Proms season, performing the Radio 1 'Ibiza Prom'.

=== Career ===
==== Radio ====
Tong's first appearance on radio was in the late 1970s on Radio Invicta, Europe's first soul music station. Later, he appeared on local radio station BBC Radio Medway, as part of the 'Soul Mafia' and performed occasional mixes for Radio London. In 1981, Tong made his first appearance on Radio 1 as the host of a 15-minute feature on Peter Powell's show—he played new tracks and covered the latest gossip and news from the dance music industry.

When Invicta Radio started in Kent in 1984, Tong became the host of a regular soul show on the station. As Tong had joined the developing dance-DJ management company of DJ-turned-journalist Eddie Gordon, of the Kent Messenger, he built a prominent county profile and performed at Gordon's local club the Slammer. Tong joined Capital Radio in 1988 to present a weekly dance programme.

In January 1991, Tong began his Friday evening show, branded as the Essential Selection for its first 15 years, on BBC Radio 1. The show still continues every week (currently it is broadcast at 10 PM for two hours, either pre-recorded from Tong's garage at his home in Los Angeles or live from the eighth floor of Broadcasting House) and Tong is now the longest serving DJ on the station (following the death of Annie Nightingale). Additionally, a one-hour Sunday edition of the programme, called "The Essential Selection - Part 2", was broadcast from April 1992 to April 1993. A spinoff, titled The Rap Selection (featuring rap, ragga and new jack swing), aired on Thursday evenings on the station from 9 to 10 PM from April 1991 until March 1992.

From October 1993, Tong oversaw the production of the Essential Mix show, which was devised and, until 2003, produced by Gordon. The show was the first BBC production to broadcast live from Ibiza, Spain. The 500th mix was broadcast on 23/24 April 2010, featuring solely Tong on the Friday night and Tong, plus DJs Sasha and Richie Hawtin, live from Circus nightclub in Liverpool, UK, for the second section.

In 2011, Tong filed a restraining order against the Massive Attack singer Shara Nelson after she harassed him with nuisance calls and falsely claimed they were married. She was given a 12-month community order and 80 hours of community service.

In November 2012, Tong was asked by Clear Channel Communications in the US to help launch a new EDM channel, on their iHeartRadio platform, called 'Evolution'. Along with the launch of the channel, Tong introduced a nightly two-hour programme titled Its All Gone Pete Tong, which is similar to his BBC 1 programme. The platform would later form the basis for Clear Channel to expand the Evolution brand, with the 20 December 2012 launch of the format on WEDX/Boston that included Tong's station promos and voice-overs. Likewise, Tong's iHeartRadio programme is also broadcast on WEDX. In addition, a supplemental 2-hour weekly programme, Evolution Beatport Show, is also aired on various Top 40/CHR and Rhythmic stations in the U.S. and in other countries and is syndicated by Premiere Networks. In 2019, Tong started a series for BBC Radio 2 called Pete Tong's House Nation, a personal exploration of house music.

==== DJ ====
Tong is one of Britain's most recognised DJs, having gained a large following of fans from his Essential Selection programme. He was appointed a Member of the Most Excellent Order of the British Empire in the 2014 New Year Honours for services to Broadcasting and Music.

From 2003 to 2007, Tong was the resident DJ at Pacha nightclub in Ibiza, where he oversaw the Pure Pacha events. In 2008, Tong left Pacha and signed with Eden nightclub in Sant Antoni de Portmany to host his own Wonderland night. Tong explained in a 2009 interview that he, "from a UK perspective", has played in Ibiza since inception (1991) and, as of the time of the interview, divided his time between the UK, Ibiza and the US.

In March 2011, he announced that he would be returning to Pacha on Friday nights with a new event named 'All Gone Pete Tong'. Tong played the Together Winter Music Festival in London, UK, at Alexandra Palace on 26 November 2011. He appeared in the 2016 Grammy-nominated documentary film about American DJ and producer Steve Aoki, titled I'll Sleep When I'm Dead.

Tong has returned to DJ in his native Kent several times in his professional career, including several stints at The Loft in Maidstone.

Additionally, Tong hosts a pool party each year during Miami Music Week at one of the hotels on South Beach. In 2018, Tong was joined by Idris Elba, The Black Madonna, Black Coffee and The Martinez Brothers, among others.

== Discography ==
=== Mix albums ===
All chart positions are in the UK Compilation Chart except for Classic House (2016), Ibiza Classics (2017) and Chilled Classics (2019) where the chart positions are for the UK Albums Chart.

- Cream Live (1995) (No. 3) (CD1, mixed with Paul Oakenfold)
- The Annual (1995) (No. 13) (CD1)
- The Annual II (1996) (No. 1) (CD1)
- Dance Nation 3 (1997) (No. 1) (Mixed by Pete Tong and Judge Jules)
- Essential Selection Summer 1997 (1997) (No. 4) (Orange cover)
- Dance Nation 4 (1997) (No. 2) (CD 1)
- The Annual III (1997) (No. 3) (CD1)
- Essential Selection Winter 1997 (1997) (No. 10) (Light blue cover)
- Dance Nation 5 (Mixed by Pete Tong and Boy George with samples taken from DJ Karrington Coles music)
- Essential Selection Spring 1998 (No. 4) (Green cover)
- Essential Selection Summer 1998 (1998) (No. 4) (Red cover of strawberries)
- Essential Selection Summer 1998 (1998) (Limited Edition) (No. 2) (Yellow cover of strawberries, CD3 is Twelve Ibiza Classics mixed by Paul Oakenfold)
- Essential Selection '98 Tong/Oakenfold (1998) (No. 13) (Orange cover of oranges)
- Essential Selection '98 Tong/Oakenfold (1998) (Limited Edition) (No. 11) (Purple cover of tinted oranges, CD3 is mixed by Carl Cox)
- Essential Selection Spring 1999 (1999) (No. 13) (Cover of gold, green and purple easter eggs)
- Essential Selection Spring 1999 (1999) (Limited Edition) (No. 3) (Gold cover of easter eggs, CD3 is Hacienda Classics mixed by Graeme Park)
- Essential Selection Ibiza 1999 (1999) (No. 11) (Cover of blue, red and yellow buckets and spades)
- Essential Selection Ibiza 1999 (1999) (No. 7) (Cover of green, purple and virdian bucket and spades, CD3 is mixed by DJ Pippi)
- Essential Selection Presents Music From The Motion Picture Human Traffic (1999)
- Essential Millennium (1999) (No. 10) (Mixed by Pete Tong/Fatboy Slim/Paul Oakenfold)
- Essential Selection Spring 2000 (2000) (No. 8)
- Essential Selection Ibiza 2000 (2000) (No. 11)
- Essential Mix 2000 (2000)
- Essential Mix Mixed by Pete Tong (2001)
- Twisted Beats (2001)
- Essential Selection Presents The Clubber's Bible Winter 2002 (2001)
- Fashion TV Presents Pete Tong (2003)
- Essential Selection Pete Tong (2003)
- Pure Pacha Ibiza: Mixed by Pete Tong and Andy B (2004)
- It's Showtime! (Pete Tong Presents Pure Pacha Vol.II Summer Season 2005 (2005)
- Essential Classics (2005)
- Pure Pacha Vol.1 (2006) (Mixed by Pete Tong & Sarah Main)
- Essential Dance Mix (2006)
- Pure Pacha 3 (Mixed with Pete Tong and Sarah Main)
- Wonderland (2008)
- Pete Tong Presents Wonderland 2009 (2009)
- Pete Tong Presents Wonderland 2010 (2010)
- Pete Tong and Riva Starr: Future Underground (2011)
- All Gone Pete Tong & Felix da House Cat Ibiza '11 (2011)
- All Gone Pete Tong & Groove Armada Miami '12 (2012)
- All Gone Pete Tong & Skream Miami '13 (2013)
- The Pete Tong Collection (2013)
- Classic House (2016) (UK No. 1)
- Ibiza Classics (2017) (UK No. 11)
- Chilled Classics (2019) (UK No. 20)
- Pete Tong & Friends - Ibiza Classics (2021)
