= Jonathan Jeremiah =

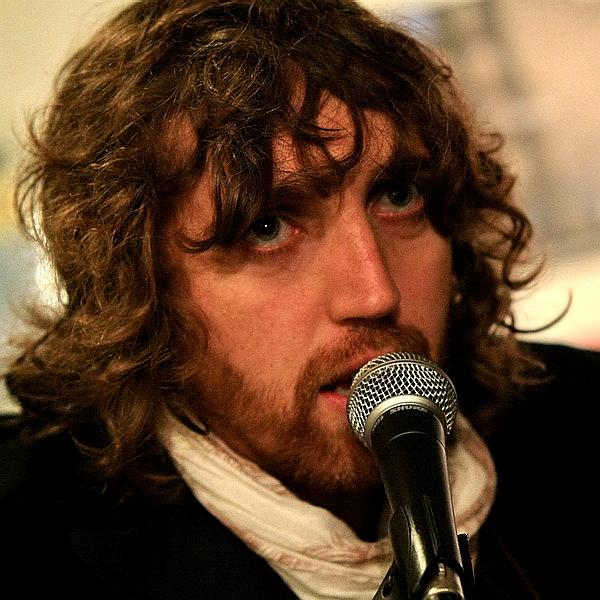

Background information
- Born: London, England
- Genres: Soul
- Occupation(s): Singer, songwriter, musician
- Years active: 2010–present
- Labels: Universal Music Group
- Website: www.jonathanjeremiah.co.uk

Jonathan Jeremiah is a British singer-songwriter from North London. He has released five studio albums.

== Career ==
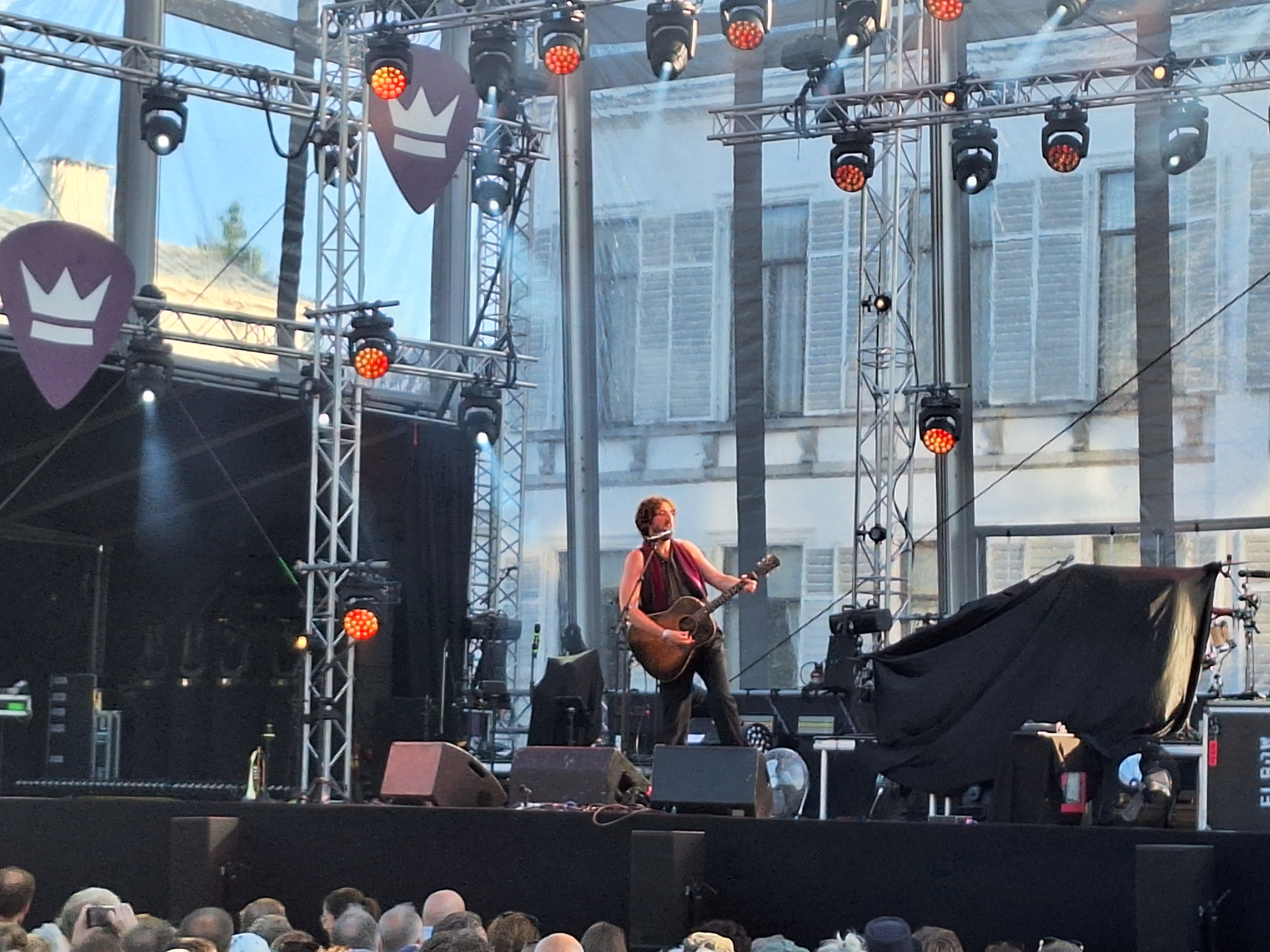
Jonathan Jeremiah at Royal Park Live 2025

Jeremiah's debut album, A Solitary Man, was released in 2011 on Island Records, followed by his second album, Gold Dust, in 2012. His second album was recorded with the Netherlands-based Metropole Orkest.

His third album, Oh Desire, was released in 2015 on Universal Music. In 2018, he released his fourth album, titled Good Day.

== Discography ==
=== Albums ===
Year	Album	Peak positions							
Year	Album	UK	AUT	BEL (Fl)	BEL (Wa)	FRA	GER	NED	SWI
2011	A Solitary Man: Credited to: Jonathan Jeremiah; Released: 21 March 2011; Record label: Island; Format: CD, digital, vinyl	—	70	11	—	—	11	3	26
2012	Gold Dust: Credited to: Jonathan Jeremiah with The Metropole Orkest; Released: 22 October 2012; Record label: Island; Format: CD, digital	—	—	49	—	—	84	12	—
2015	Oh Desire: Credited to: Jonathan Jeremiah; Released: 27 March 2015; Record label: UMG; Format: CD, digital	—	—	64	—	—	—	31	—
2018	Good Day: Released: 31 August 2018; Record label: PIAS; Format: CD, digital	—	—	—	—	—	40	25	—
2022	Horsepower for the Streets: Released: 9 September 2022; Record label: PIAS; Format: CD, digital, vinyl	—	—	123	142	—	63	44	—
2025	We Come Alive: Released: 7 November 2025; Record label: PIAS; Format: CD, digital, vinyl	—	—	—	—	—	—	—	—

=== Singles ===
Year	Single	Peak positions					Album
Year	Single	BEL (Fl)	BEL (Wa)	FRA	NED	SWI	Album
2010/ 2011	"Lost"	21 (Ultratip)	—	—	47	—	A Solitary Man
2010/ 2011	"Happiness"	25 (Ultratop)	42 (Ultratip)	—	38	—	A Solitary Man
2010/ 2011	"Heart of Stone"	43 (Ultratop)	—	—	—	—	A Solitary Man
2011/ 2012	"Never Gonna"	52 (Ultratip)	—	—	—	—	A Solitary Man
2012	"Lazin' in the Sunshine" (with The Metropole Orkest)	19 (Ultratip)	—	—	—	—	Gold Dust
2013	"Gold Dust" (with The Metropole Orkest)	65 (Ultratip)	—	42	—	45	Gold Dust
2015	"Arms"	77 (Ultratip)	—	—	—	—	Oh Desire
2018	"Good Day"	17 (Ultratip)	—	—	—	—	Good Day
2018	"U-Bahn (It's Not Too Late for Us)"	18 (Ultratip)	—	—	—	—	Good Day

== Awards and nominations ==
Year	Award	Category	Nominee/work	Result	Ref.
2019	Pop Awards	Song Of The Year Award	"Good Day"	Nominated	
2023	Pop Awards	Album Of The Year Award	Horsepower for the Streets	Nominated	
