= Muse: Drones World Tour =

- Cinematic release poster
- Directed by: Tom Kirk; Jan Willem Schram
- Based on: Drones World Tour by Muse
- Produced by: Muse
- Starring: Matt Bellamy; Dominic Howard; Chris Wolstenholme; Morgan Nicholls
- Cinematography: Hans-Peter van Velthoven
- Edited by: Nikki Faberij de Jonge; Dominic Withworth
- Music by: Muse
- Production company: Corrino Studios
- Distributed by: Warner Bros. Trafalgar Releasing
- Release date: 12 July 2018
- Running time: 1:25:19
- Country: United Kingdom
- Language: English

Muse: Drones World Tour is the third live video album by English rock band Muse, which was released on 12 July 2018 in a worldwide one-night only cinema release. The video combines four individual concerts together recorded in Germany, Italy and The Netherlands. The concerts were part of their Drones World Tour shows that took place from 2015–16, done in support of their album of the same name.

== Background ==
Details of the video were first hinted at back in May 2016 when on Twitter, Bellamy suggested that some upcoming gigs at the time would be filmed for the future. Then a few days later, cinematographer Hans-Peter van Velthoven, officially confirmed that a film was in progress in collaboration with Corrino Studios. On 16 October 2016, a 4:44 video from the film was leaked online by someone who worked on the film of the band performing "Madness", but was later taken down. The band then fell silent on the project for a year, but continued to state the film was still in progress. On 13 April 2018, the movie along with the poster was accidentally listed onto several cinema chain websites.

The film was officially announced on 26 April 2018, with a one-night only cinema release worldwide on 12 July. Bellamy stated at the time the film would later get released on streaming and for digital purchase, though as of 2026 this has not occurred.

Following the credits, the film showed a teaser of a new song that would be released a week later on 19 July 2018. This song turned out to be "Something Human".

== Track listing ==
1. Drones
2. Psycho
3. Reapers
4. Hysteria
5. Dead Inside
6. The Handler
7. Supermassive Black Hole
8. Prelude
9. Starlight
10. Madness
11. Time is Running Out
12. Uprising
13. The Globalist
14. Drones (reprise)
15. Take a Bow
16. Mercy
17. Knights of Cydonia

Notes

1. "Hysteria" is preceded by "Interlude" from Absolution (2003).
2. "Knights of Cydonia" is preceded by "Man with a Harmonica", written by Ennio Morricone, and used as an intro.

== Personnel ==
- Matt Bellamy - vocals, guitar, piano
- Chris Wolstenholme - bass, backing vocals, rhythm guitar (track 13), harmonica (track 17)
- Dominic Howard - drums, percussion, electronic drums (tracks 7 and 10), backing vocals (track 7), synthesizers (track 15)
- Morgan Nicholls – keyboards, synthesizers, electronics, backing vocals, percussion, cabasa (track 7), guitar (tracks 5, 9, 10 and 12)
