= Drones World Tour =

2015–16 concert tour by Muse

- Tour by Muse
- Promotional poster for the band's April 2016 UK tour
- Associated album: Drones
- Start date: 23 May 2015
- End date: 21 August 2016
- Legs: 8
- No. of shows: 92 in Europe; 27 in North America; 7 in Asia; 6 in South America; Total: 132 (1 cancelled)
- Box office: $88.5 million (98 shows)

Muse concert chronology
- Psycho Tour (2015); Drones World Tour (2015–16); Simulation Theory World Tour (2019)

The Drones World Tour was a worldwide concert tour by the English rock band Muse. Staged in support of the band's 2015 album Drones, the tour visited arenas and festivals throughout 2015 and is the tenth concert tour the band has carried out. It began on 23 May 2015 in Norwich, England at the BBC Radio 1's Big Weekend. The Drones World Tour sold over 1.2 million tickets and grossed $23M from 34 shows in 2015, plus $65.5M from 64 shows in 2016.

A live video of the tour entitled Muse: Drones World Tour, was released in cinemas worldwide on 12 July 2018.

== Rehearsals ==
Rehearsals for the Drones festival tour took part in late April and were held in Air Studios, where Muse previously rehearsed for the Origin of Symmetry anniversary concerts at Reading and Leeds festivals, and where Muse also recorded Absolution and parts of The 2nd Law, Drones and Simulation Theory.

== European Festivals ==
Muse using the LED pillars in Paris 2016

Muse played various festivals around Europe on the first leg of the tour, which started 23 May 2015. This leg of the tour also included Muse's debut performance at Download Festival, which they also headlined.

The second leg of the European Festivals tour began on 24 June 2016 at Glastonbury. The new stage set up featured 11 LED pillars which could be manually pushed back and forth by members of the crew to accommodate the show. Bellamy compared this set up to The Resistance tour on his Instagram. An updated version of this set was used for the remaining dates in 2017, complete with new lighting rigs and lasers.

== Drones Arena Tour ==
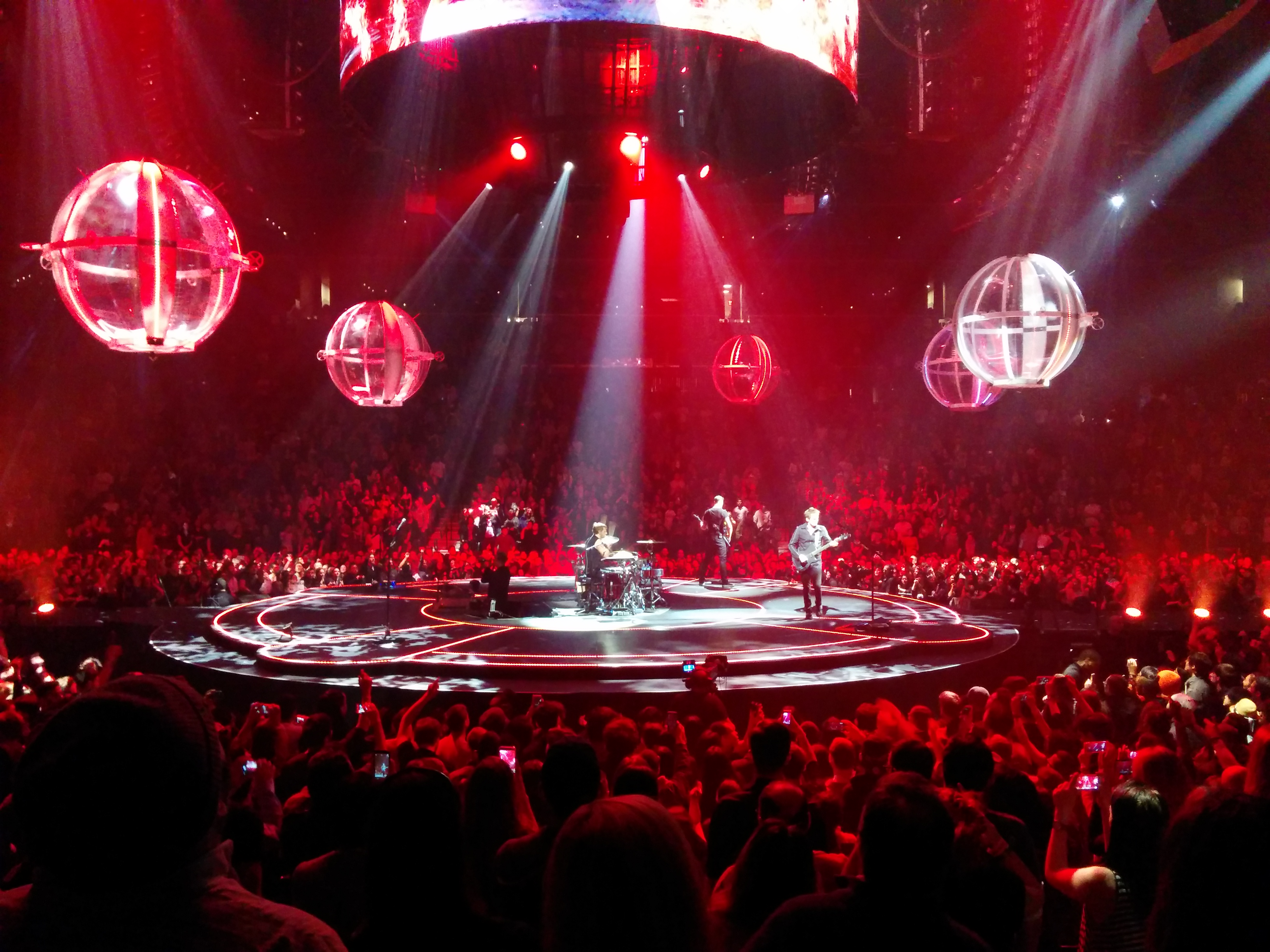
Drones used in the show

Matt Bellamy confirmed that Muse would be tour North America in late 2015, and Europe in 2016. The stage setup is an 'in-the-round' setup, with a circular stage in the middle, similar to U2's 360 Tour, with catwalks on either end of the stage. Bellamy has also said that they will be flying drones over the audience during the shows. This set up was first used on 17 November 2015 in Mexico City at the start of the band's North America tour. The Arena tour dates prior in South America and Asia the band used their festival production.

Confetti and streamers during Mercy

The show begins with spherical drones being launched from a space station-style grid at the top of arenas, and they later re-appear during the course of the concert. There are also retractable video screens using projection, a spherical 360 screen over the main central stage, and a giant inflatable device designed to look like a Reaper drone. Confetti and streamers were also shot into the audience during performances of "Mercy".

However, the show has had technical difficulties. Two concerts in San Diego & Las Vegas were rescheduled due to "technical and logistical" challenges, while the drones were not used at all in three gigs, and one gig in Detroit saw several drones fail simultaneously.

Average Setlist

1. "Drones"
2. "Psycho"
3. "Reapers"
4. "Dead Inside
5. "Interlude + Hysteria"
6. "Bliss" or "Citizen Erased" or "Plug In Baby"
7. "The 2nd Law: Isolated System" (shortened)
8. "The Handler"
9. "Supermassive Black Hole
10. "Prelude" + "Starlight"
11. "Apocalypse Please" or "United States of Eurasia" or "Feeling Good"
12. "Munich Jam" (drum and bass jam)
13. "Madness"
14. "Resistance" or "Undisclosed Desires"
15. "JFK" + "Revolt" or "Stockholm Syndrome" or "Reapers" (if not played earlier)
16. "Time Is Running Out"
17. "Uprising"
18. "The Globalist"
19. "Drones" (reprise)

Encore:

1. "Mercy"
2. "Man with A Harmonica" + "Knights of Cydonia"

Exceptions:

- "Drones" was very occasionally replaced with "Drill Sergeant" at the start of the show
- The piano slot after "Starlight" was not always played; instead the band would skip straight to "Munich Jam"
- A range of different songs have been played after "JFK", including "Assassin", "Hysteria" and "Defector"
- "Take a Bow" was added to most setlists from 1 March 2016 onwards as the first song of the encore
- On 18 April 2016, during the second of their shows at Glasgow's SSE Hydro, the band were joined onstage by a lone bagpiper and a group of Highland dancers to play "Glasgow Jam" (a different drum and bass jam) that replaced "Munich Jam".

Song	Album
"Sunburn"	Showbiz
"Muscle Museum"	Showbiz
"Showbiz"	Showbiz
"Uno"	Showbiz
"Agitated"	Uno (single)
"Yes Please"	Sunburn (single)
"New Born"	Origin of Symmetry
"Bliss"	Origin of Symmetry
"Hyper Music"	Origin of Symmetry
"Plug In Baby"	Origin of Symmetry
"Micro Cuts"	Origin of Symmetry
"Citizen Erased"	Origin of Symmetry
"Futurism"	Origin of Symmetry
"Feeling Good"	Origin of Symmetry
"Dead Star"	Dead Star / In Your World
"Apocalypse Please"	Absolution
"Time Is Running Out"	Absolution
"Sing For Absolution"	Absolution
"Stockholm Syndrome"	Absolution
"Hysteria" (paired with Interlude)	Absolution
"Blackout"	Absolution
"Butterflies & Hurricanes"	Absolution
"Fury"	Absolution
"The Groove"	Time Is Running Out (single)
"Take a Bow"	Black Holes and Revelations
"Starlight"	Black Holes and Revelations
"Supermassive Black Hole"	Black Holes and Revelations
"Map of the Problematique"	Black Holes and Revelations
"Assassin"	Black Holes and Revelations
"Knights of Cydonia"	Black Holes and Revelations
"Glorious"	Black Holes and Revelations
"Easily"	Black Holes and Revelations
"Uprising"	The Resistance
"Resistance"	The Resistance
"Undisclosed Desires"	The Resistance
"United States of Eurasia"	The Resistance
"Supremacy"	The 2nd Law
"Madness"	The 2nd Law
"Panic Station"	The 2nd Law
"Prelude"	The 2nd Law
"The 2nd Law: Isolated System"	The 2nd Law
"Dead Inside"	Drones
"[Drill Sergeant]"	Drones
"Psycho"	Drones
"Mercy"	Drones
"Reapers"	Drones
"The Handler"	Drones
"[JFK]"	Drones
"Defector"	Drones
"Revolt"	Drones
"The Globalist"	Drones
"Drones"	Drones

== Tour dates ==
List of concerts, showing date, city, country, venue, tickets sold, number of available tickets and amount of gross revenue
Date	City	Country	Venue	Opening act	Attendance	Revenue
Leg 1 — European Festivals (Leg 1)
23 May 2015	Norwich	England	BBC Radio 1's Big Weekend	—N/a	—N/a	—N/a
29 May 2015	Munich	Germany	Rockavaria	—N/a	—N/a	—N/a
30 May 2015	Gelsenkirchen	Germany	Rock Im Revier	—N/a	—N/a	—N/a
5 June 2015	Vienna	Austria	Rock In Vienna	—N/a	—N/a	—N/a
6 June 2015	Biel	Switzerland	Sonisphere Festival	—N/a	—N/a	—N/a
12 June 2015	Landgraaf	Netherlands	Pinkpop Festival	—N/a	—N/a	—N/a
13 June 2015	Castle Donington	England	Download Festival	—N/a	—N/a	—N/a
14 June 2015	Warsaw	Poland	Orange Warsaw Festival	—N/a	—N/a	—N/a
19 June 2015	Moscow	Russia	Park Live Festival	—N/a	—N/a	—N/a
21 June 2015	St. Petersburg	Russia	Tuborg GreenFest	—N/a	—N/a	—N/a
24 June 2015	Seinäjoki	Finland	Provinssirock	—N/a	—N/a	—N/a
26 June 2015	Norrköping	Sweden	Bråvalla Festival	—N/a	—N/a	—N/a
28 June 2015	Werchter	Belgium	Rock Werchter	—N/a	—N/a	—N/a
30 June 2015	Cologne	Germany	Gloria Theater	Royal Blood	—N/a	—N/a
2 July 2015	Roskilde	Denmark	Roskilde Festival	—N/a	—N/a	—N/a
4 July 2015	Arras	France	Main Square Festival	—N/a	—N/a	—N/a
5 July 2015	Roeser	Luxembourg	Rock-a-Field	—N/a	—N/a	—N/a
9 July 2015	Lisbon	Portugal	NOS Alive	—N/a	—N/a	—N/a
11 July 2015	Bilbao	Spain	Bilbao BBK Live	—N/a	—N/a	—N/a
13 July 2015	Aix-les-Bains	France	Musilac Music Festival	—N/a	—N/a	—N/a
16 July 2015	Carhaix	France	Vieilles Charrues Festival	—N/a	—N/a	—N/a
18 July 2015	Rome	Italy	Rock in Roma	—N/a	—N/a	—N/a
Leg 2 — Asia
25 July 2015	Naeba	Japan	Fuji Rock Festival	—N/a	—N/a	—N/a
Leg 3 — Europe
11 September 2015	London	England	Electric Ballroom	—N/a	—N/a	—N/a
13 September 2015	Berlin	Germany	Lollapalooza Berlin	—N/a	—N/a	—N/a
16 September 2015	Brussels	Belgium	Ancienne Belgique	—N/a	—N/a	—N/a
Leg 4 — Asia
19 September 2015	Beijing	China	MasterCard Center	—N/a	7,573 / 7,573	$753,180
21 September 2015	Shanghai	China	Mercedes-Benz Arena Shanghai	—N/a	10,122 / 10,122	$1,058,479
23 September 2015	Bangkok	Thailand	Impact Arena	The Ruse	6,711 / 7,902	$623,301
26 September 2015	Singapore		Singapore Indoor Stadium	The Ruse	9,558 / 9,558	$1,094,708
28 September 2015	Hong Kong	China	AsiaWorld–Expo	The Ruse	9,066 / 9,066	$894,088
30 September 2015	Seoul	South Korea	Olympic Gymnastics Arena	The Ruse	10,595 / 10,837	$974,494
Leg 5 — South America
15 October 2015	Santiago	Chile	Movistar Arena	—N/a	—N/a	—N/a
17 October 2015	Buenos Aires	Argentina	Complejo Al Río	Utopians	—N/a	—N/a
19 October 2015	Córdoba	Argentina	Orfeo Superdomo	Utopians	—N/a	—N/a
22 October 2015	Rio de Janeiro	Brazil	HSBC Arena	Utopians	—N/a	—N/a
24 October 2015	São Paulo	Brazil	Allianz Parque	Utopians	—N/a	—N/a
27 October 2015	Bogotá	Colombia	Parque Deportivo 222	Telebit	—N/a	—N/a
Leg 6 — North America (First official leg of Drones World Tour)
17 November 2015	Mexico City	Mexico	Palacio de los Deportes	The New Regime	—N/a	—N/a
18 November 2015	Mexico City	Mexico	Palacio de los Deportes	The New Regime	—N/a	—N/a
20 November 2015	Mexico City	Mexico	Palacio de los Deportes	The New Regime	—N/a	—N/a
21 November 2015	Mexico City	Mexico	Corona Capital	—N/a	—N/a	—N/a
1 December 2015	Houston	United States	Toyota Center	Phantogram	7,482 / 11,224	$551,820
2 December 2015	Dallas	United States	American Airlines Center	—N/a (Note: Phantogram was supposed to play but were cut due to technical difficulties.)	9,924 /11,163	$643,334
5 December 2015	Glendale	United States	Gila River Arena	Phantogram	6,714 / 11,225	$415,490
10 December 2015	Vancouver	Canada	Rogers Arena	Phantogram	—N/a	—N/a
12 December 2015	Seattle	United States	KeyArena	Phantogram	—N/a	—N/a
13 December 2015	Portland	United States	Moda Center	Phantogram	—N/a	—N/a
15 December 2015	Oakland	United States	Oracle Arena	Phantogram	—N/a	—N/a
18 December 2015	Los Angeles	United States	Staples Center	Phantogram	—N/a	—N/a
19 December 2015	Los Angeles	United States	Staples Center	Phantogram	—N/a	—N/a
7 January 2016 (Note: The concert on 7 January 2016 in San Diego at the Valley View Casino Center was originally planned to take place on 16 December, but was rescheduled due to unforeseen logistical and technical challenges.)	San Diego	United States	Valley View Casino Center	Phantogram	—N/a	—N/a
9 January 2016 (Note: The concert on 9 January 2016 in Las Vegas at the Mandalay Bay Events Center was originally planned to take place on 6 December, but was rescheduled due to unforeseen logistical and technical challenges.)	Las Vegas	United States	Mandalay Bay Events Center	Phantogram	—N/a	—N/a
13 January 2016	Chicago	United States	United Center	X Ambassadors	13,439 / 13,439	$819,321
14 January 2016	Detroit	United States	Joe Louis Arena	X Ambassadors	8,748 / 13,109	$518,330
16 January 2016	Toronto	Canada	Air Canada Centre	X Ambassadors	—N/a	—N/a
18 January 2016	Quebec City	Canada	Centre Videotron	X Ambassadors	27,279 / 29,250 (Note: The score data is representative of the two shows at the Centre Videotron on 18 and 23 January 2016 respectively.)	$1,468,520
20 January 2016	Montreal	Canada	Bell Centre	X Ambassadors	28,475 / 29,660	$1,315,450
21 January 2016	Montreal	Canada	Bell Centre	X Ambassadors	28,475 / 29,660	$1,315,450
23 January 2016	Quebec City	Canada	Centre Videotron	X Ambassadors		
25 January 2016	Boston	United States	TD Garden	X Ambassadors	11,111 / 16,372	$740,815
27 January 2016	Brooklyn	United States	Barclays Center	X Ambassadors	14,916 / 14,916	$874,783
29 January 2016	Newark	United States	Prudential Center	X Ambassadors	—N/a	—N/a
31 January 2016	Philadelphia	United States	Wells Fargo Center	X Ambassadors	13,103 / 13,563	$586,933
1 February 2016	Washington, D.C.	United States	Verizon Center	X Ambassadors	10,865 / 17,144	$801,188
Leg 7 — Europe
26 February 2016	Paris	France	AccorHotels Arena	X Ambassadors	108,182 / 108,182	$7,787,807
27 February 2016	Paris	France	AccorHotels Arena	X Ambassadors	108,182 / 108,182	$7,787,807
29 February 2016	Paris	France	AccorHotels Arena	Phantogram	108,182 / 108,182	$7,787,807
1 March 2016	Paris	France	AccorHotels Arena	Phantogram	108,182 / 108,182	$7,787,807
3 March 2016	Paris	France	AccorHotels Arena	Nothing But Thieves	108,182 / 108,182	$7,787,807
4 March 2016	Paris	France	AccorHotels Arena	Nothing But Thieves	108,182 / 108,182	$7,787,807
6 March 2016	Cologne	Germany	Lanxess Arena	Nothing But Thieves	—N/a	—N/a
7 March 2016	Amsterdam	Netherlands	Ziggo Dome	Nothing But Thieves	—N/a	—N/a
9 March 2016	Amsterdam	Netherlands	Ziggo Dome	Nothing But Thieves	—N/a	—N/a
10 March 2016	Amsterdam	Netherlands	Ziggo Dome	Nothing But Thieves	—N/a	—N/a
12 March 2016	Brussels	Belgium	Palais 12	Nothing But Thieves	—N/a	—N/a
13 March 2016	Brussels	Belgium	Palais 12	Nothing But Thieves	—N/a	—N/a
15 March 2016	Brussels	Belgium	Palais 12	The Van Jets (Note: Nothing But Thieves were supposed to play but got replaced by The Van Jets after one of the members got sick.)	—N/a	—N/a
16 March 2016	Brussels	Belgium	Palais 12	The Van Jets	—N/a	—N/a
31 March 2016	Munich	Germany	Olympiahalle	De Staat	—N/a	—N/a
2 April 2016	Birmingham	England	Barclaycard Arena Birmingham	Nothing But Thieves	—N/a	—N/a
3 April 2016	London	England	The O_{2} Arena	Nothing But Thieves	92,167 / 92,167 (Note: The score data is combined from the shows held at The O_{2} Arena from 3, 11, 12, 14 & 15 April 2016 respectively.)	$8,119,590
5 April 2016	Dublin	Ireland	3Arena	Nothing But Thieves	—N/a	—N/a
6 April 2016	Belfast	Northern Ireland	SSE Arena	Nothing But Thieves	—N/a	—N/a
8 April 2016	Manchester	England	Manchester Arena	Nothing But Thieves	37,777 / 38,058	$3,214,350
9 April 2016	Manchester	England	Manchester Arena	Phantogram	37,777 / 38,058	$3,214,350
11 April 2016	London	England	The O_{2} Arena	Phantogram		
12 April 2016	London	England	The O_{2} Arena	Phantogram; My Vitriol		
14 April 2016	London	England	The O_{2} Arena	Phantogram; My Vitriol		
15 April 2016	London	England	The O_{2} Arena	Phantogram		
17 April 2016	Glasgow	Scotland	The SSE Hydro	Phantogram	22,069 / 22,760	$2,000,800
18 April 2016	Glasgow	Scotland	The SSE Hydro	Nothing But Thieves	22,069 / 22,760	$2,000,800
30 April 2016	Ischgl	Austria	Top of the Mountain	—N/a	—N/a	—N/a
2 May 2016	Lisbon	Portugal	MEO Arena	De Staat	—N/a	—N/a
3 May 2016	Lisbon	Portugal	MEO Arena	De Staat	—N/a	—N/a
5 May 2016	Madrid	Spain	Barclaycard Center Madrid	De Staat	—N/a	—N/a
6 May 2016	Madrid	Spain	Barclaycard Center Madrid	De Staat	—N/a	—N/a
9 May 2016	Vienna	Austria	Wiener Stadthalle	De Staat	—N/a	—N/a
11 May 2016	Zürich	Switzerland	Hallenstadion	De Staat	26,000 / 26,000	$2,869,240
12 May 2016	Zürich	Switzerland	Hallenstadion	De Staat	26,000 / 26,000	$2,869,240
14 May 2016	Milan	Italy	Mediolanum Forum	De Staat	—N/a	—N/a
15 May 2016	Milan	Italy	Mediolanum Forum	De Staat	—N/a	—N/a
17 May 2016	Milan	Italy	Mediolanum Forum	De Staat	—N/a	—N/a
18 May 2016	Milan	Italy	Mediolanum Forum	De Staat	—N/a	—N/a
20 May 2016	Milan	Italy	Mediolanum Forum	De Staat	—N/a	—N/a
21 May 2016	Milan	Italy	Mediolanum Forum	De Staat	—N/a	—N/a
3 June 2016	Berlin	Germany	Mercedes-Benz Arena Berlin	Jack Garratt	—N/a	—N/a
4 June 2016	Prague	Czech Republic	O_{2} Arena Prague	Jack Garratt	—N/a	—N/a
6 June 2016	Hamburg	Germany	Barclaycard Arena Hamburg	Jack Garratt	9,316 / 11,943	$622,544
8 June 2016	Copenhagen	Denmark	Forum Copenhagen	Jack Garratt	—	—
9 June 2016	Copenhagen	Denmark	Forum Copenhagen	The New Regime	—	—
11 June 2016	Stockholm	Sweden	Ericsson Globe	The New Regime	—	—
12 June 2016	Oslo	Norway	Telenor Arena	The New Regime	—	—
14 June 2016	Helsinki	Finland	Hartwall Arena	The New Regime	—	—
16 June 2016	Riga	Latvia	Arena Riga	My Vitriol	—	—
17 June 2016	Kaunas	Lithuania	Žalgiris Arena	My Vitriol	—	—
21 June 2016	Moscow	Russia	Olimpiyskiy	My Vitriol	—	—
Leg 8 — European Festivals (Leg 2)
24 June 2016	Pilton	England	Glastonbury Festival	—N/a	—N/a	—N/a
28 June 2016	Paris	France	Eiffel Tower	X Ambassadors	—	—
30 June 2016	Marmande	France	Garorock	—N/a	—N/a	—N/a
2 July 2016	Montreux	Switzerland	Montreux Jazz Festival	—N/a	—N/a	—N/a
8 July 2016	Kyiv	Ukraine	U-Park Festival	—N/a	—N/a	—N/a
14 July 2016	Bern	Switzerland	Gurten Festival	—N/a	—N/a	—N/a
16 July 2016	Benicàssim	Spain	Festival Internacional de Benicàssim	—N/a	—N/a	—N/a
18 July 2016	Nîmes	France	Le Festival de Nîmes	—N/a	—N/a	—N/a
19 July 2016	Nyon	Switzerland	Paléo Festival	—N/a	—N/a	—N/a
23 July 2016	Athens	Greece	Ejekt Festival	—N/a	—N/a	—N/a
29 July 2016	Bucharest	Romania	Rock The City	—N/a	—N/a	—N/a
6 August 2016	Reykjavík	Iceland	Laugardalshöll	—	—	—
13 August 2016	Budapest	Hungary	Sziget Festival	—N/a	—N/a	—N/a
19 August 2016	Biddinghuizen	Netherlands	Lowlands Festival	—N/a	—N/a	—N/a
20 August 2016	Konstanz	Germany	Rock am See	—N/a	—N/a	—N/a
21 August 2016	Kraków	Poland	Live Music Festival	—N/a	—N/a	—N/a
Total					315,794 / 349,554 (90%)	$24,057,848

== Cancelled shows ==
List of cancelled concerts, showing date, city, country, venue and reason for cancellation
Date	City	Country	Venue	Reason
26 July 2016	Istanbul	Turkey	Nebula Festival	2016 Turkish coup d'état attempt
