= The Globalist (song) =

2015 song by Muse

Song by Muse

from the album Drones
- Released: 18 June 2015
- Studio: The Warehouse Studio (Vancouver, British Columbia)
- Genre: Symphonic rock; new prog; progressive metal; art rock
- Length: 10:07
- Label: Warner Bros.; Helium-3
- Composers: Matt Bellamy; Edward Elgar
- Lyricist: Matt Bellamy
- Producers: Mutt Lange; Muse

"The Globalist" is a song by English rock band Muse, and the eleventh track from the band's seventh studio album, Drones. An apocalyptic song, it serves as a sequel to the song "Citizen Erased" from their 2001 album Origin of Symmetry. Part of this song contains music based on "Nimrod" from Enigma Variations, composed by Edward Elgar. The song follows "Aftermath", which centers on the album's protagonist discovering love. Matt Bellamy has said that the album's negative stories, "The Globalist" and "Drones", together serve as an epilogue. At ten minutes and seven seconds, it is the second longest song in Muse's discography, after "Exogenesis: Symphony".

== Concept ==
"The Globalist" tells the story of the protagonist's decision to become a dictator intent on destroying everything and everyone by using drones. The song is divided into three parts. The first part details the protagonist's origin, as he begins to revolt against the system that didn't raise him with love and made him want to "transform the Earth to his desire". After the protagonist receives a code, which Muse word-for-word had hid in the song, he began World War Three. A backwards code has fragments from the first seven songs on the album and consists of the lines:

- Dead inside
- A fucking psycho (from "Psycho")
- The world just disavows (from "Mercy")
- Kill by remote control (from "Reapers")
- Programmed to obey (from "The Handler")
- I'm a Defector (from "Defector")
- Our freedom's just a loan (from "Revolt")

In the second part, the protagonist becomes insane and destroys the world via nuclear weapons transferred through drones. The third part of "The Globalist" deals with the aftermath of the protagonist's decision, as he bemoans there is "nothing left to love".

== Reception ==
"The Globalist" received mixed reviews. Rolling Stone described the song as "a grand hymn of despair with a hot jam in the center", praising the song's message.
