= List of UK Rock & Metal Singles Chart number ones of 2015 =

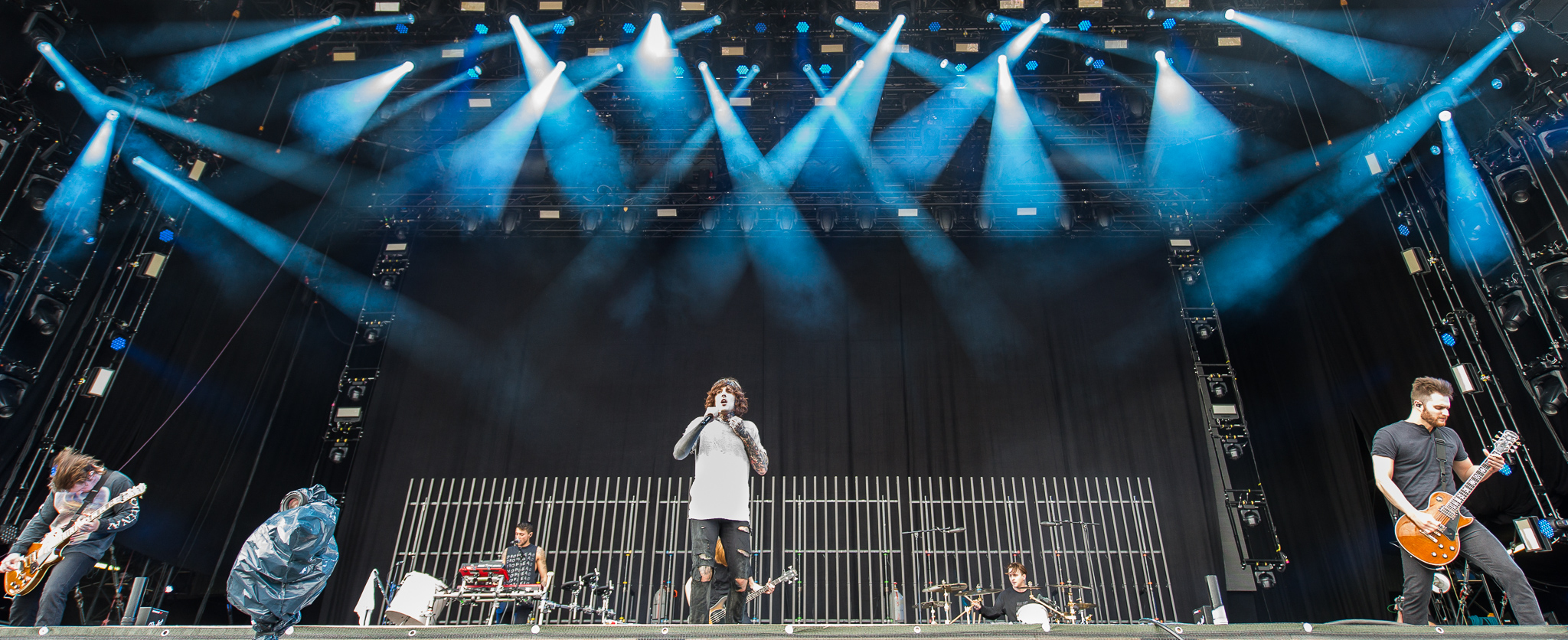
Bring Me the Horizon's "Throne" was the longest-running number one single of 2015, spending 14 weeks atop the chart.

The UK Rock & Metal Singles Chart is a record chart which ranks the best-selling rock and heavy metal songs in the United Kingdom. Compiled and published by the Official Charts Company, the data is based on each track's weekly physical sales, digital downloads and streams. In 2015, there were 17 singles that topped the 52 published charts. The first number-one single of the year was "Drown" by Bring Me the Horizon, the first single from the band's fifth studio album That's the Spirit, which spent the first two weeks atop the chart. The final number-one single of the year was the 2003 release "Christmas Time (Don't Let the Bells End)" by The Darkness, which reached number one for the week ending 17 December and remained there for the last three weeks of the year.

The most successful song on the UK Rock & Metal Singles Chart in 2015 was "Throne", the third single from Bring Me the Horizon's fifth studio album That's the Spirit, which spent a total of 14 weeks at number one during the year including a single run of 12 consecutive weeks. The band also topped the chart with three more singles, spending a total of 19 weeks at number one. Fall Out Boy's "Centuries" also spent 14 weeks at number one during the year, while the band spent seven more weeks at number one with the singles "Irresistible", "Uma Thurman" and "Immortals". Muse spent four weeks at number one with "Psycho", "Dead Inside" and "Mercy". "Christmas Time (Don't Let the Bells End)" by The Darkness was number one for three weeks and AC/DC's "Thunderstruck" was number one for two weeks.

== Chart history ==
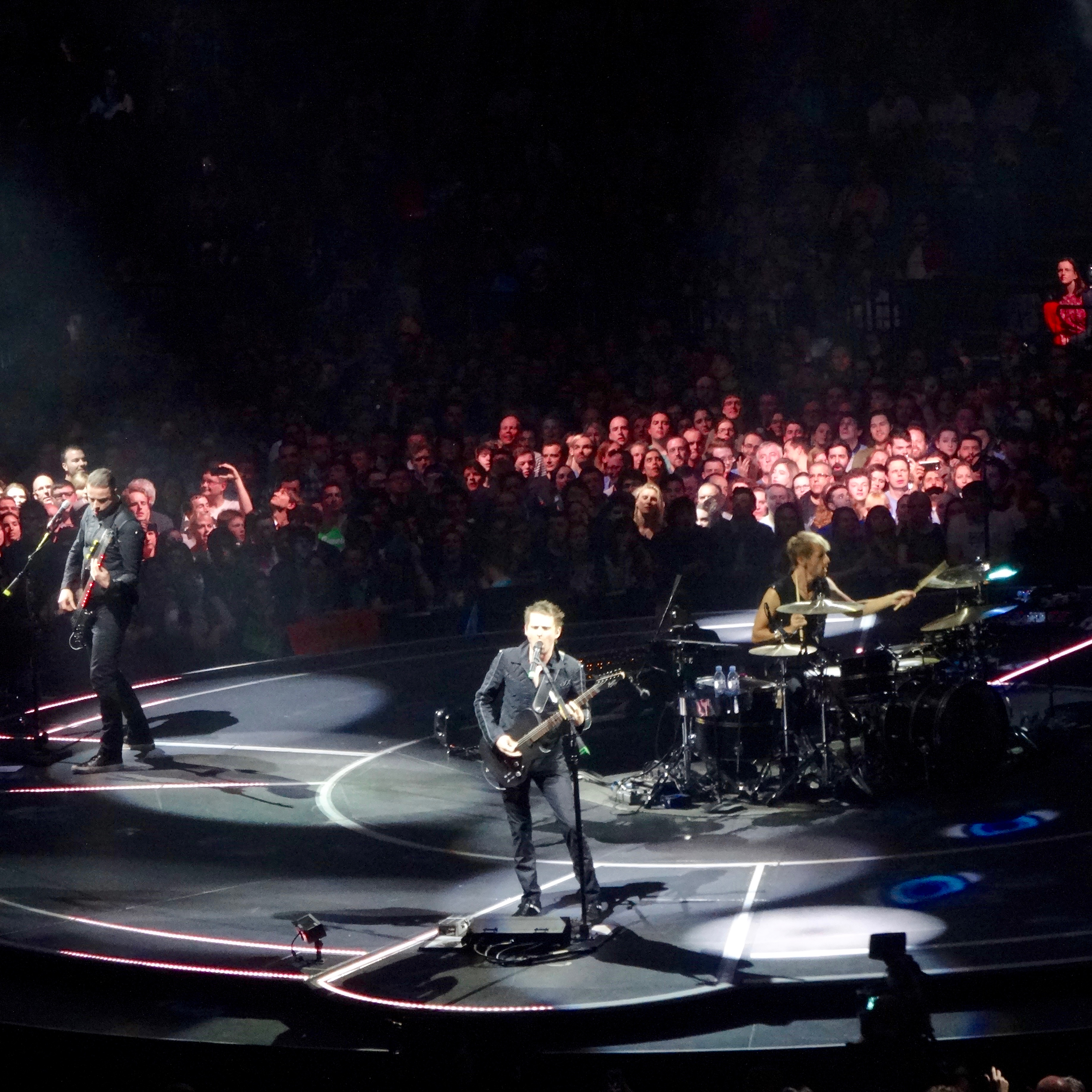
Three songs from Muse's seventh studio album Drones topped the chart in 2015, for a total of four weeks.

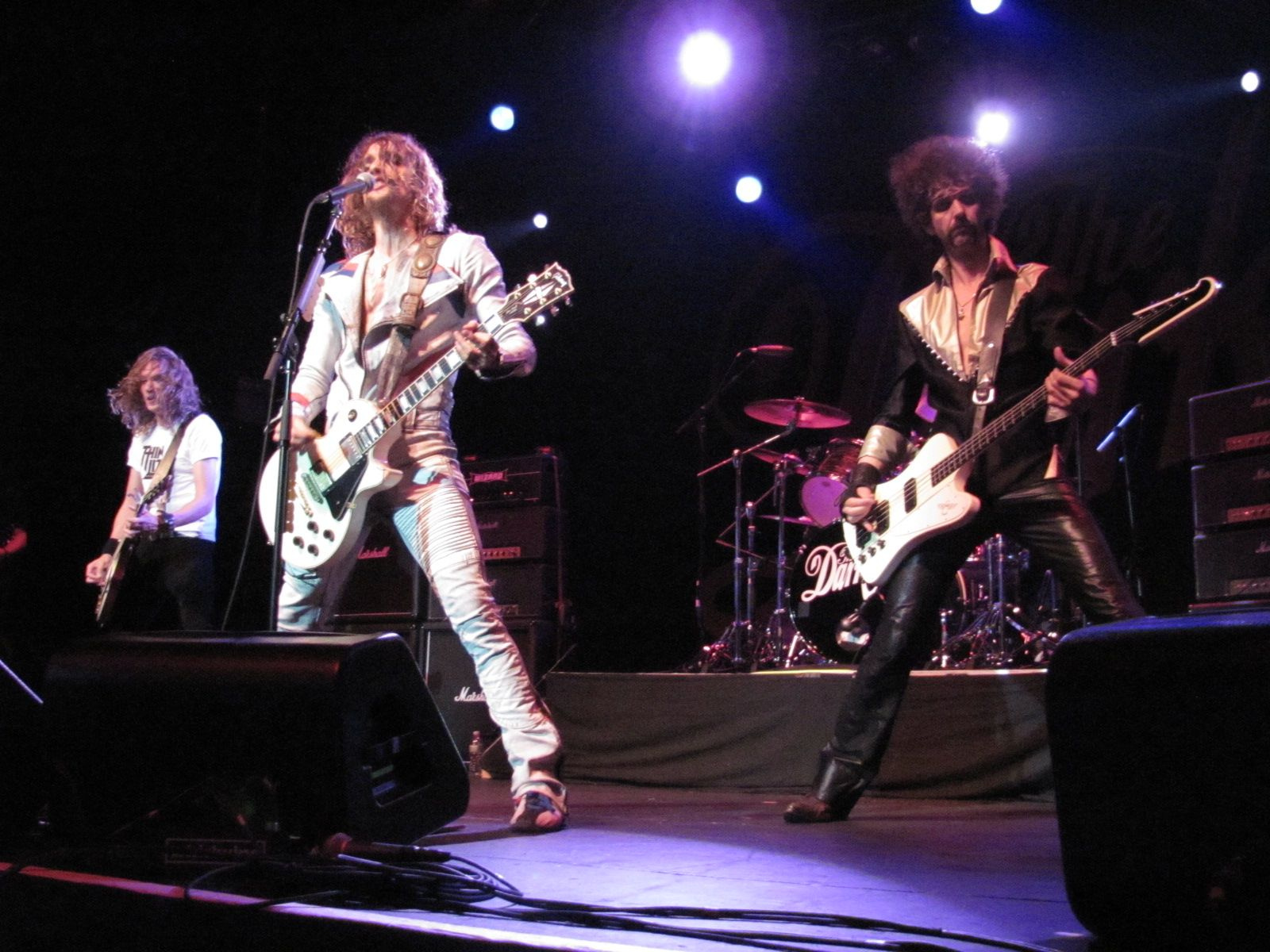
The Darkness spent the last three weeks of the year at number one with their 2003 Christmas single "Christmas Time (Don't Let the Bells End)".

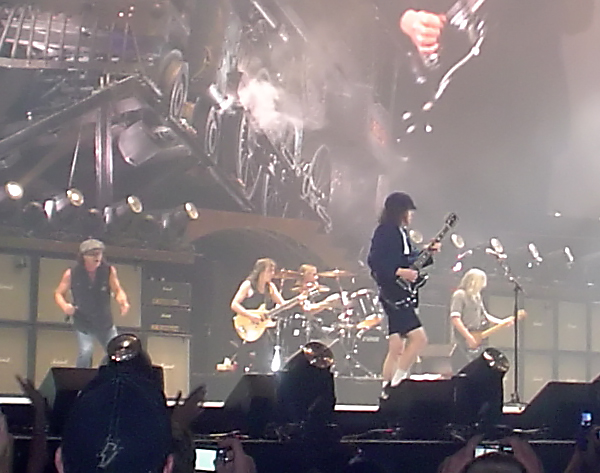
AC/DC spent two weeks at number one in July 2015 with "Thunderstruck".

Issue date	Single	Artist(s)	Record label(s)	Ref.
3 January	"Drown"	Bring Me the Horizon	RCA	
10 January	"Drown"	Bring Me the Horizon	RCA	
17 January	"Irresistible"	Fall Out Boy	Def Jam	
24 January	"Uma Thurman"	Fall Out Boy	Def Jam	
31 January	"Centuries"	Fall Out Boy	Island	
7 February	"Centuries"	Fall Out Boy	Island	
14 February	"Centuries"	Fall Out Boy	Island	
21 February	"Centuries"	Fall Out Boy	Island	
28 February	"Centuries"	Fall Out Boy	Island	
7 March	"Centuries"	Fall Out Boy	Island	
14 March	"Centuries"	Fall Out Boy	Island	
21 March	"Kids in the Dark"	All Time Low	Hopeless	
28 March	"Psycho"	Muse	Helium 3/Warner Bros.	
4 April	"Dead Inside"	Muse	Helium 3/Warner Bros.	
11 April	"Dead Inside"	Muse	Helium 3/Warner Bros.	
18 April	"Centuries"	Fall Out Boy	Island	
25 April	"Centuries"	Fall Out Boy	Island	
2 May	"Hallelujah"	Panic! at the Disco	DCD2 Records/Fueled by Ramen	
9 May	"Centuries"	Fall Out Boy	Island	
16 May	"Centuries"	Fall Out Boy	Island	
23 May	"Centuries"	Fall Out Boy	Island	
30 May	"Mercy"	Muse	Helium 3/Warner Bros.	
6 June	"Centuries"	Fall Out Boy	Island	
13 June	"Immortals"	Fall Out Boy	Def Jam	
20 June	"Uma Thurman"	Fall Out Boy	Def Jam	
27 June	"Uma Thurman"	Fall Out Boy	Def Jam	
4 July	"Uma Thurman"	Fall Out Boy	Def Jam	
9 July	"Thunderstruck"	AC/DC	Columbia	
16 July	"Thunderstruck"	AC/DC	Columbia	
23 July	"Happy Song"	Bring Me the Horizon	RCA	
30 July	"Happy Song"	Bring Me the Horizon	RCA	
6 August	"Throne"	Bring Me the Horizon	RCA	
13 August	"Throne"	Bring Me the Horizon	RCA	
20 August	"Throne"	Bring Me the Horizon	RCA	
27 August	"Throne"	Bring Me the Horizon	RCA	
3 September	"Throne"	Bring Me the Horizon	RCA	
10 September	"Throne"	Bring Me the Horizon	RCA	
17 September	"Throne"	Bring Me the Horizon	RCA	
24 September	"Throne"	Bring Me the Horizon	RCA	
1 October	"Throne"	Bring Me the Horizon	RCA	
8 October	"Throne"	Bring Me the Horizon	RCA	
15 October	"Throne"	Bring Me the Horizon	RCA	
22 October	"Throne"	Bring Me the Horizon	RCA	
29 October	"Irresistible"	Fall Out Boy	Def Jam	
5 November	"Bring Me to Life"	Evanescence	Epic	
12 November	"Throne"	Bring Me the Horizon	RCA	
19 November	"Throne"	Bring Me the Horizon	RCA	
26 November	"Centuries"	Fall Out Boy	Island	
3 December	"True Friends"	Bring Me the Horizon	RCA	
10 December	"Sweet Child o' Mine"	Guns N' Roses	Geffen	
17 December	"Christmas Time (Don't Let the Bells End)"	The Darkness	Must Destroy	
24 December	"Christmas Time (Don't Let the Bells End)"	The Darkness	Must Destroy	
31 December	"Christmas Time (Don't Let the Bells End)"	The Darkness	Must Destroy	

== See also ==
- 2015 in British music
- List of UK Rock & Metal Albums Chart number ones of 2015
