= I'm a Realist =

Single by The Cribs

from the album Men's Needs, Women's Needs, Whatever
- B-side: "Bastards of Young"; "I'm a Realist" (Postal Service remix)
- Released: 25 February 2008
- Recorded: Vancouver, British Columbia
- Genre: Indie rock; alternative rock
- Length: 3:03
- Label: Wichita Recordings; Warner Bros. Records; Shock; Cooperative Music; Hostess
- Songwriters: Jarman, Jarman and Jarman
- Producer: Alex Kapranos

The Cribs singles chronology
"Don't You Wanna Be Relevant? / Our Bovine Public" (2007)	"I'm a Realist" (2008)	"Cheat on Me" (2009)

"I'm a Realist" is the fourth and final single from the third album by British indie rock band the Cribs, released in February 2008. Men's Needs, Women's Needs, Whatever, released in May 2007, featured three other commercially successful and critically lauded songs in the form of 'Men's Needs', 'Moving Pictures' and 'Our Bovine Public'. Recorded at the Warehouse Studio in Vancouver, British Columbia with Franz Ferdinand vocalist and guitarist Alex Kapranos, the song received mastering treatment at Alchemy, London, United Kingdom.

== Physical release ==
The song received a physical release on seven inch vinyl and digital download. Frequent band collaborator Nick Scott designed the sleeve, with the release featuring the catalogue number 'WEBB163S'.

== B-Sides ==
The seven inch vinyl b-side featured a cover of 'Bastards of Young' by the Replacements, a group that the Jarman brothers have long admired. Bernard Butler produced the song, recorded at West Heath Studios, London. A remix of the single by the Postal Service also features on the rare North American version of the vinyl, available only at the dates on that continental tour in 2008.

== Miscellaneous ==
The song came backed with a sticker of the band and therefore made the release chart ineligible due to BPI restrictions. The music video features a 'doomed' rendezvous between two friends at a Cribs concert, with the protagonist succumbing to death in the bath via a falling plant pot. The band make a fleeting appearance at the end of the video.

== Track listings ==
All tracks are written by Gary Jarman, Ross Jarman and Ryan Jarman.

7" vinyl
No.	Title	Length
1.	"I'm a Realist"	3:03
2.	"Bastards of Young"	3:30
