= List of UK Rock & Metal Albums Chart number ones of 2015 =

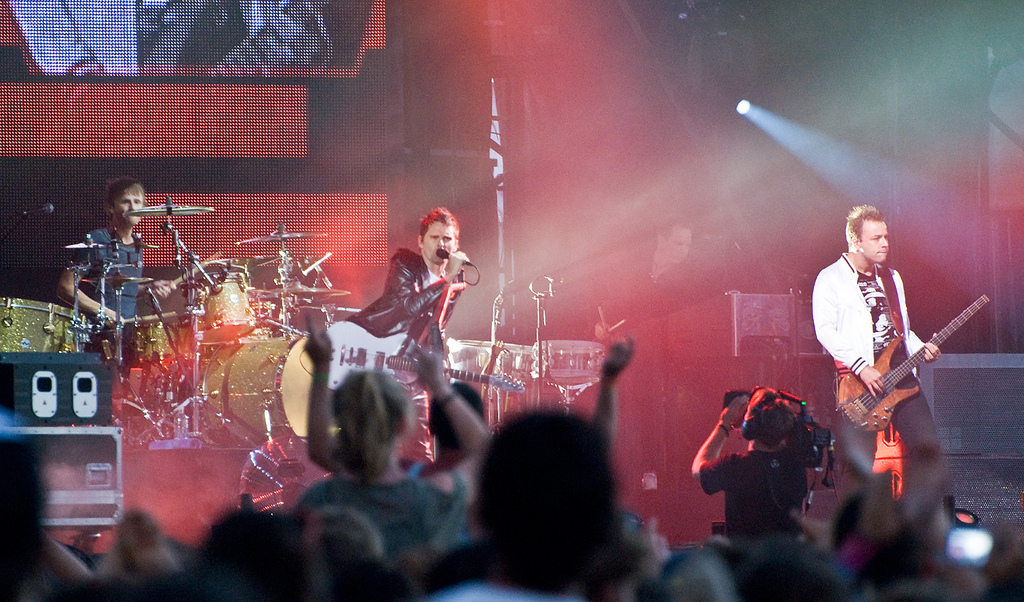
Muse's seventh studio album Drones was the longest-running number-one album of 2015, spending seven weeks between June and July atop the chart.

The UK Rock & Metal Albums Chart is a record chart which ranks the best-selling rock and heavy metal albums in the United Kingdom. Compiled and published by the Official Charts Company, the data is based on each album's weekly physical sales, digital downloads and streams. In 2015, there were 32 albums that topped the 52 published charts. The first number-one album of the year was AC/DC's sixteenth studio album Rock or Bust, which had previously spent a week at number one in December 2014. The final number-one album of the year was Alone in the Universe, the first album credited to Jeff Lynne's ELO, which topped the chart for the week ending 26 November and remained at number one for nine consecutive weeks into January 2016 (including the last six weeks of 2015).

The most successful album on the UK Rock & Metal Albums Chart in 2015 was Muse's seventh studio album Drones, which spent seven consecutive weeks at number one between 20 June and 30 July. Alone in the Universe spent six weeks at number one and was the best-selling rock and metal album of the year, ranking 18th in the UK End of Year Albums Chart. Fall Out Boy's sixth studio album American Beauty/American Psycho and David Gilmour's fourth solo album Rattle That Lock each spent five weeks at number one, ranking as the 28th and 35th best-selling albums in the UK at the end of the year, respectively. Two albums – Pink Floyd's fifteenth studio album The Endless River and All Time Low's sixth studio album Future Hearts – each spent two weeks at number one in 2015.

== Chart history ==
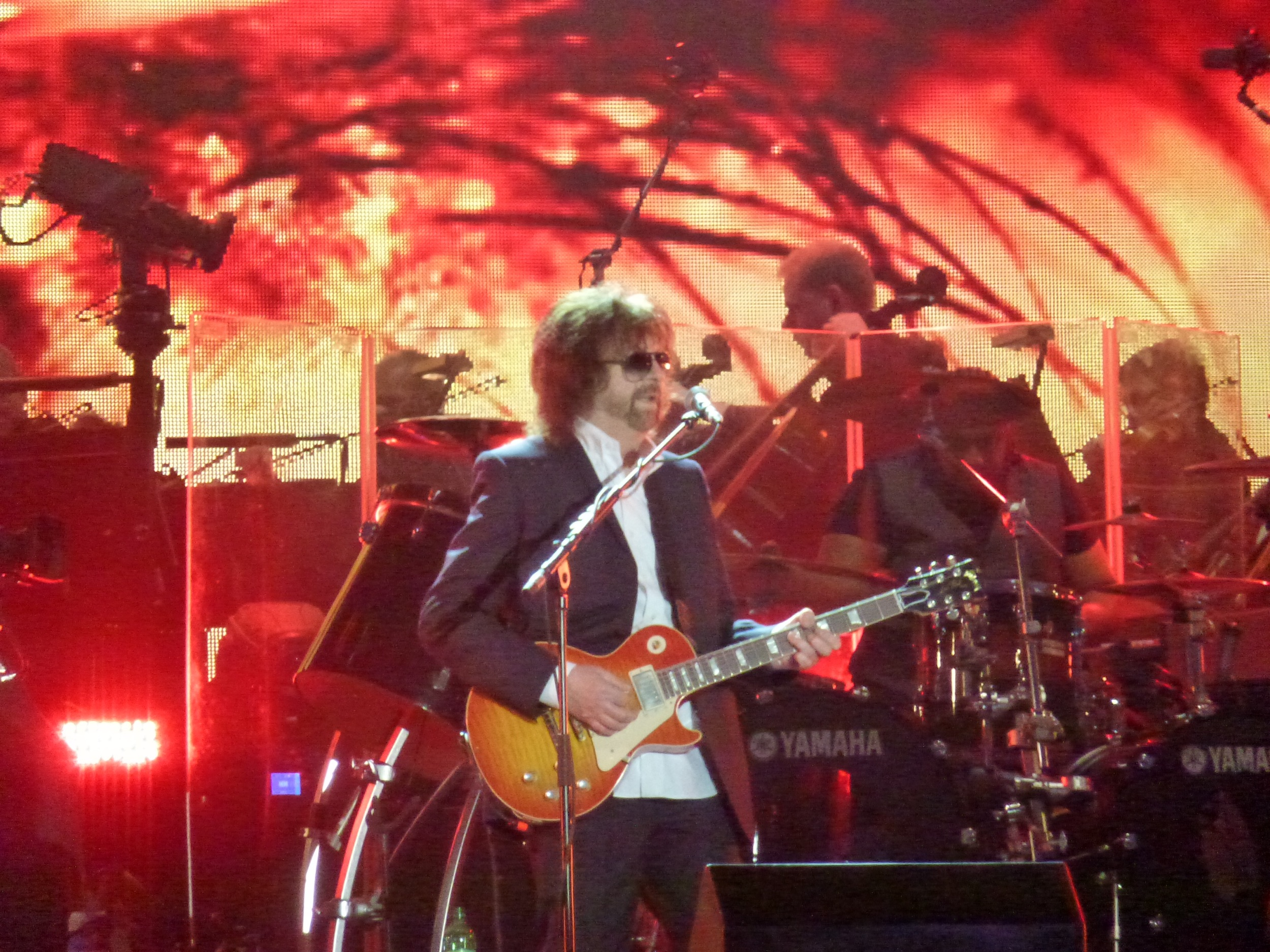
Alone in the Universe, the first album credited to Jeff Lynne's ELO, spent six weeks at number one and was the best-selling rock and metal album of the year.

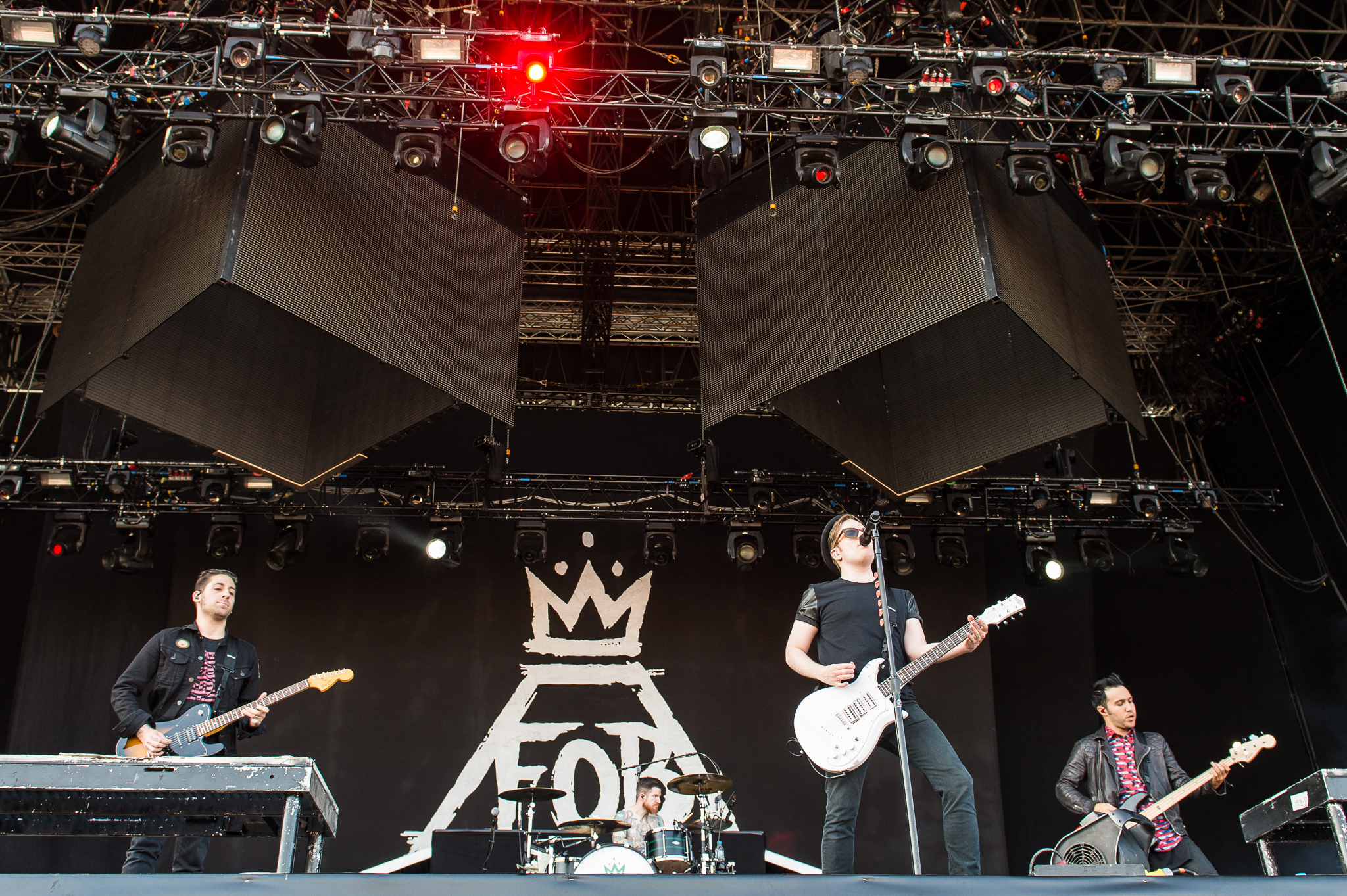
Fall Out Boy's ninth studio album American Beauty/American Psycho spent five weeks at number one in 2015.

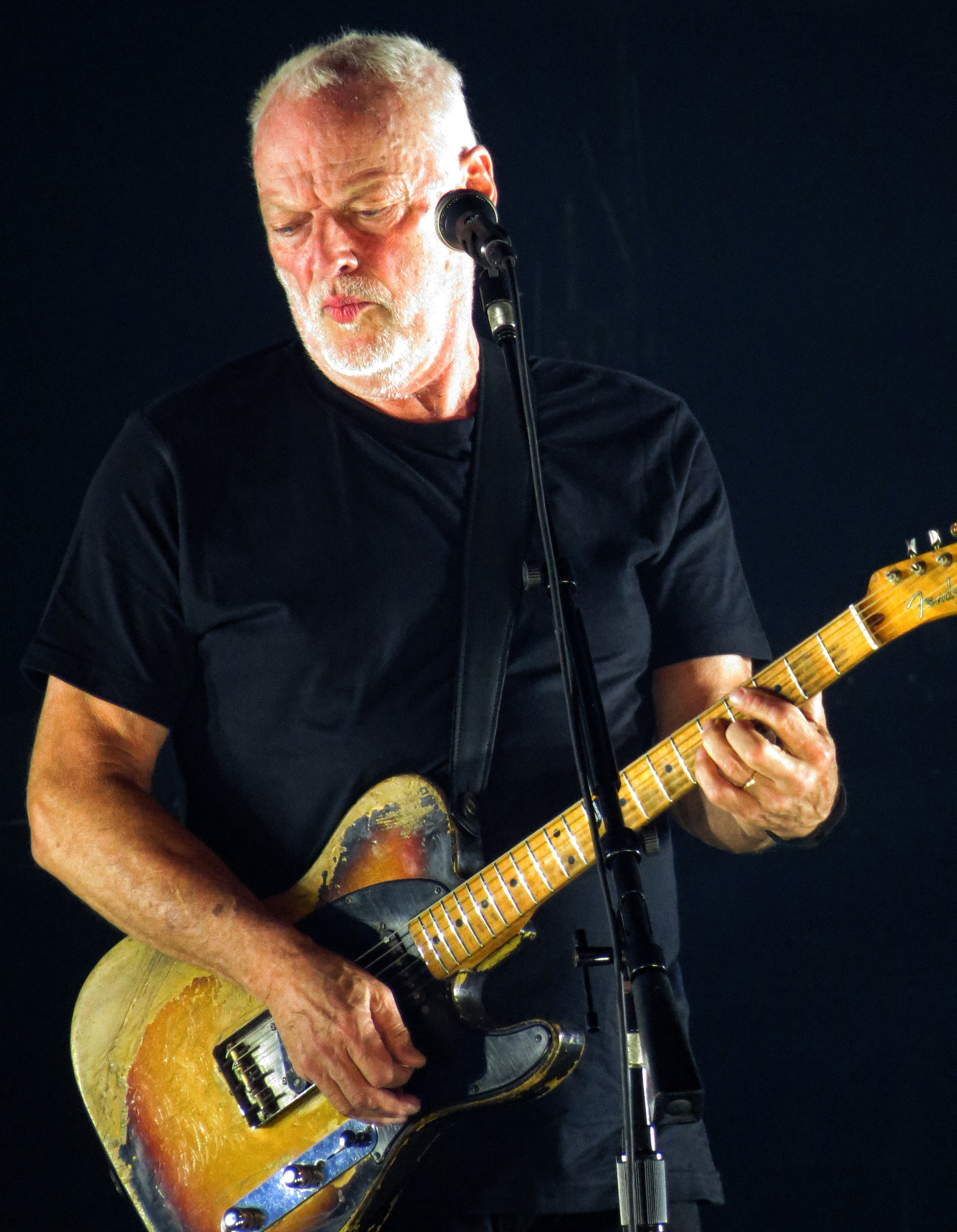
David Gilmour's fourth solo album Rattle That Lock spent five consecutive weeks at number one in October.

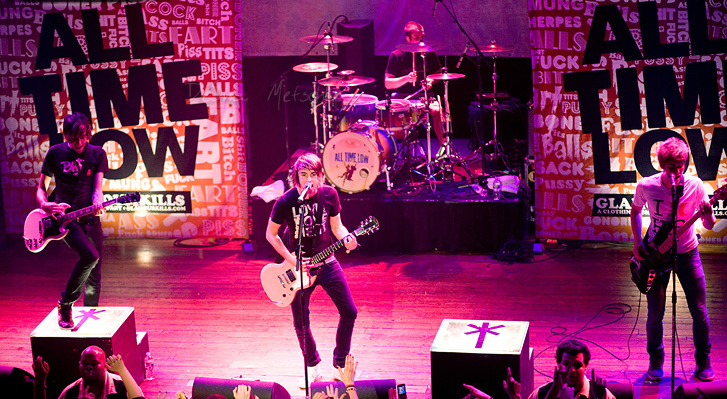
All Time Low achieved their first UK Rock & Metal Albums Chart number one in 2015 with Future Hearts, which spent two separate weeks atop the chart.

Key
†	Indicates best-selling rock album of 2015

Issue date	Album	Artist(s)	Record label(s)	Ref.
3 January	Rock or Bust	AC/DC	Columbia	
10 January	Sonic Highways	Foo Fighters	RCA	
17 January	The Endless River	Pink Floyd	Rhino	
24 January	The Endless River	Pink Floyd	Rhino	
31 January	American Beauty/American Psycho	Fall Out Boy	Def Jam	
7 February	American Beauty/American Psycho	Fall Out Boy	Def Jam	
14 February	American Beauty/American Psycho	Fall Out Boy	Def Jam	
21 February	Holding All the Roses	Blackberry Smoke	Earache	
28 February	Wonder Days	Thunder	earMusic	
7 March	Physical Graffiti	Led Zeppelin	Rhino	
14 March	Hand. Cannot. Erase.	Steven Wilson	Kscope	
21 March	Raise a Little Hell	The Answer	Napalm	
28 March	Madness	Sleeping with Sirens	Epitaph	
4 April	Brainwashed	While She Sleeps	Search and Destroy	
11 April	Endless Forms Most Beautiful	Nightwish	Nuclear Blast	
18 April	Future Hearts	All Time Low	Hopeless	
25 April	Into the Wild Life	Halestorm	Atlantic	
2 May	Future Hearts	All Time Low	Hopeless	
9 May	American Beauty/American Psycho	Fall Out Boy	Def Jam	
16 May	American Beauty/American Psycho	Fall Out Boy	Def Jam	
23 May	Greatest Hits	Guns N' Roses	Geffen Records	
30 May	Sol Invictus	Faith No More	Reclamation	
6 June	Greatest Hits	Foo Fighters	RCA	
13 June	Last of Our Kind	The Darkness	Canary Dwarf	
20 June	Drones	Muse	Helium 3/Warner Bros.	
27 June	Drones	Muse	Helium 3/Warner Bros.	
4 July	Drones	Muse	Helium 3/Warner Bros.	
9 July	Drones	Muse	Helium 3/Warner Bros.	
16 July	Drones	Muse	Helium 3/Warner Bros.	
23 July	Drones	Muse	Helium 3/Warner Bros.	
30 July	Drones	Muse	Helium 3/Warner Bros.	
6 August	VII: Sturm und Drang	Lamb of God	Nuclear Blast	
13 August	Presence	Led Zeppelin	Rhino	
20 August	Automatic	Don Broco	Search and Destroy	
27 August	Venom	Bullet for My Valentine	RCA	
3 September	Immortalized	Disturbed	Reprise	
10 September	Bad Magic	Motörhead	UDR	
17 September	The Book of Souls	Iron Maiden	Parlophone	
24 September	That's the Spirit	Bring Me the Horizon	RCA	
1 October	Rattle That Lock	David Gilmour	Columbia	
8 October	Rattle That Lock	David Gilmour	Columbia	
15 October	Rattle That Lock	David Gilmour	Columbia	
22 October	Rattle That Lock	David Gilmour	Columbia	
29 October	Behind the Devil's Back	Fightstar	Fightstar	
5 November	Pylon	Killing Joke	Spinefarm	
12 November	Def Leppard	Def Leppard	earMusic	
19 November	Rattle That Lock	David Gilmour	Columbia	
26 November	Alone in the Universe †	Jeff Lynne's ELO	RCA	
3 December	Alone in the Universe †	Jeff Lynne's ELO	RCA	
10 December	Alone in the Universe †	Jeff Lynne's ELO	RCA	
17 December	Alone in the Universe †	Jeff Lynne's ELO	RCA	
24 December	Alone in the Universe †	Jeff Lynne's ELO	RCA	
31 December	Alone in the Universe †	Jeff Lynne's ELO	RCA	

== See also ==
- 2015 in British music
- List of UK Rock & Metal Singles Chart number ones of 2015
