= Globalist =

Globalist may refer to

== Publications ==
- The Globalist, an American political online magazine
- The Yale Globalist, an American undergraduate political magazine from Yale University

== Other uses ==
- Person who believes in globalism, a political ideology related to interconnections across the world
- Member of the "New World Order", a conspiracy theory which espouses that malicious agents ("globalists") are attempting to form a world government
- "The Globalist" (song), a 2015 song by English rock band Muse
