= Aftermath (Muse song) =

Single by Muse

from the album Drones
- Released: 11 March 2016
- Recorded: 2014
- Studio: The Warehouse Studio (Vancouver, British Columbia)
- Genre: Progressive rock
- Length: 5:48
- Label: Warner Bros.; Helium-3
- Songwriter: Matt Bellamy
- Producers: Mutt Lange; Muse

Muse singles chronology
"Revolt" (2015)	"Aftermath" (2016)	"Reapers" (2016)

Music video
- "Aftermath" on YouTube

"Aftermath" is a ballad song by English rock band Muse from their seventh album, Drones. It was released as the fourth single from the album on 11 March 2016.

== Background ==
The song is part of a concept album about "the journey of a human, from their abandonment and loss of hope, to their indoctrination by the system to be a human drone, to their eventual defection from their oppressors".

According to Matt Bellamy, this is one of the two songs that talk about love; in 'Aftermath' the protagonist finds love again. The song is said to be the opposite of Dead Inside.

The song has never been performed live and is to date the band's only single release never to have done so.

== Recording ==
While producer Mutt Lange had some input on the arrangement of various songs, this is the only song on the album on which the band allowed him to directly influence the songwriting. In a Radio X interview with the band, Bellamy stated that it was "the first time ever we let somebody sort of say things like 'try playing this note or try playing that note' and I'll go like 'yeah, right'. Normally I'd say like 'sorry, that's not what you do, I do that'". Describing "Aftermath" as "one of the few times I allowed a producer to have some say over a song", this approach was the result of Bellamy's respect for Lange's work with ballads, as he himself stated to not "really know the ballad world". In the same interview, Bellamy revealed that the song started off as a bluesy track before the band allowed Lange to take it into a more "progressive, spacey" and balladesque direction. While sounding "like an 80s ballad", the band consider "Aftermath" "the most experimental moment on the album". According to Bellamy, this was also the song on which the producer "showed his true colors" during recording, telling him to “just jam it up, man, just play it heavy, go for it” and after recording further expressing his approval by adding “listen boys, this is the song".

== Song description ==
NME described the song as an "after-the-battle singalong in the vein of Rod Stewart's version of the Sutherland Brothers' 'Sailing' or, oh yes, Dire Straits' 'Brothers in Arms'".

Bellamy wrote the song after watching the film Fury starring Brad Pitt, being inspired by a particular scene in the movie: “There's a bit in the middle where they go into the apartment, there’s a couple of girls there and you think it’s going to get wrong, things are going to go dark side but they end up having this lovely moment”.

The song starts off with the sound of wind, soon joined by violins and synths. Guitars then make up a Hendrix-style ballad. Later on in the song bass and drums join into the slow rhythm and the song stays quite soft until an all-together ending.

== Music video ==
The music video is directed by Japanese comedian and animator Tekken, who has also previously worked on the music videos of "Exogenesis: Symphony Part 3 (Redemption)" and "Follow Me".
