= The 13th Note Café =

Scottish music venue

- The Note
- Interactive map of The 13th Note Café
- Address: 50-60 King Street; Glasgow; G1 5QT
- Location: Glasgow, Scotland
- Coordinates: 55°51′24″N 4°14′48″W
- Seating type: standing
- Capacity: 110
- Type: music venue bar restaurant

Construction
- Opened: 1997
- Closed: 19 July 2023

Website
- 13thnote.co.uk

The 13th Note Café was a restaurant, bar and music venue in Glasgow, Scotland.

From its beginnings on Glassford Street (what is now Bar Bacchus), the 13th Note moved to its present site on King Street in 1997. A few years later, the 13th Note franchise expanded to include a larger club venue on Clyde Street. The holding company that owned both venues went into receivership in November 2001. In the summer of 2002, The 13th Note Club was bought over by the Channelfly Group (owners of the Barfly franchise), leaving only the café venue still open under the original 13th Note name.

The venues of the 13th Note have hosted concerts by a number of notable acts, including Idlewild, Belle & Sebastian and Franz Ferdinand.

Alex Kapranos, the lead singer and guitarist of Franz Ferdinand took over as the music programmer at the Kazoo Club from Jim Byrne of Dexter Slim and the Pickups, who established the successful Kazoo club with his wife Pat. Alex had his first gig at the Kazoo club then became host when the Byrnes gave it up when an entry charge was introduced. Alex also hosted the 99p Club. Another notable music programmer was Brendan O'Hare.

== Controversy, Strike and Closure ==
In mid-2023, the owners of 13th Note became embroiled in a dispute with their workers over contracts, safe working conditions, and a living wage. One of the workers was reported to have said that the cafe's owners were "so used to operating outwith the law that they are now at a point where they don't even understand it". Strike action was initiated and subsequently on 19 July 2023, the bar announced that it would be closing down. All 18 workers lost their jobs as a result. In August 2023, a benefit concert was held as part of a fundraising campaign – started by a group of ex-staff – to re-open the venue as an employee-owned co-operative, with a pot of approximately £10,000 raised.

In April 2024, former employees won their case at an employment tribunal, with the judge finding in their favour that the previous owner had failed to provide the statutory ninety days notice of redundancy, resulting in an order that the injured parties be paid the equivalent in lost wages.

In May 2024, the collective of workers formally submitted a bid to take over the lease. In October 2025, the campaign emailed sponsors that the bid take over the lease had been refused.

In Summer 2026, the site of the former 13th Note was taken over and reopened as a bar/restaurant venue called "Andersons".
