= Don't You Wanna Be Relevant? / Our Bovine Public =

Single by The Cribs

from the album Men's Needs, Women's Needs, Whatever
- B-side: "My Adolescent Dreams"; "Kind Words from the Broken Hearted"
- Released: 29 October 2007
- Recorded: Vancouver, British Columbia
- Genre: Indie rock; alternative rock
- Length: 3:02 / 2:18
- Label: Wichita Recordings; Warner Bros. Records; Shock; Cooperative Music; Hostess
- Songwriter(s): Jarman, Jarman and Jarman
- Producer(s): Alex Kapranos

The Cribs singles chronology
"Moving Pictures" (2007)	"Don't You Wanna Be Relevant? / Our Bovine Public" (2007)	"I'm a Realist" (2008)

"Don't You Wanna Be Relevant? / Our Bovine Public" arrived in October 2007 as a Double A-side single by British indie rock band The Cribs. The first song, "Don't You Wanna be Relevant?', provides listeners with a new non-LP single, whereas the second, 'Our Bovine Public', opens Men's Needs, Women's Needs, Whatever, the album released in May 2007. Along with "Get Yr Hands Out of My Grave", the Cribs and Will Jackson produced "Don't You Wanna be Relevant?" at Soundworks Studios, Leeds, with "Our Bovine Public" recorded at the Warehouse Studio in Vancouver, British Columbia with Franz Ferdinand vocalist and guitarist Alex Kapranos. Both songs received mastering treatment at Alchemy, London, United Kingdom.

== Physical release ==
The song received a physical release in numerous forms, through two seven inch records and a CD single, in addition to digital download. Frequent band collaborator Nick Scott designed the sleeve, including a picture disc, with the releases featured as catalogue numbers 'WEBB156S', 'WEBB156SX' and 'WEBB156SCD'.

== B-Sides ==
"My Adolescent Dreams", the CD single B-side, and "Kind Words from the Broken Hearted", the second vinyl flip, came from sessions recorded at West Heath Studios, London, where the band recorded their second LP The New Fellas. Moreover, Edwyn Collins and Sebastian Lewsley, who both worked on that record, returned for production duties. "Kind Words from the Broken Hearted" features Gary on guitar and bass, with Ryan playing organ.

== Chart position and critical reception ==
The single received positive reviews from a number of music publications. The song went on to reach number thirty-nine in the UK Singles Chart.

Professional ratings
Review scores
Source	Rating
Digital Spy	4/5 stars
Drowned in Sound	8/10 stars
MusicOMH	(Positive)
Gigwise	3.5/5 stars
NME	(Positive) link

== Music video and fanzine ==
The video for "Don't You Wanna be Relevant?" features an animated version of the band playing the song, alongside some people dancing to their music. The viewer sees Ryan experience his heart exploding, which goes on affect everyone else in the video, as they in turn disintegrate, teeth fall out and discolour, and insects infest their bodies. The three band members follow suit and fall apart at the end.

"Our Bovine Public" features footage from a short UK tour undertaken in early 2007, documented in the Leave Too Neat film that came with some editions of Men's Needs, Women's Needs, Whatever.

The second vinyl B-side, "Kind Words from the Broken Hearted", gives name to a print fanzine based around the band.

== Track listings ==
All tracks are written by Gary Jarman, Ross Jarman and Ryan Jarman

CD single
No.	Title	Length
1.	"Don't You Wanna Be Relevant?"	3:02
2.	"Our Bovine Public"	2:18
3.	"My Adolescent Dreams"	2:32

7" vinyl one
No.	Title	Length
1.	"Our Bovine Public"	2:18
2.	"Don't You Wanna Be Relevant?"	3:02

7" vinyl two
No.	Title	Length
1.	"Don't You Wanna Be Relevant?"	3:02
2.	"Kind Words from the Broken Hearted"	3:43
