= Sound Bites: Eating on Tour with Franz Ferdinand =

Book by Alex Kapranos

- Author: Alex Kapranos
- Illustrator: Andy Knowles
- Cover artist: Andy Knowles
- Language: English
- Genre: Food / Diary
- Publisher: Fig Tree (UK)
- Publication date: 2 November 2006 (UK)
- Publication place: United Kingdom
- Pages: 144
- ISBN: 1-905490-09-7
- OCLC: 70766059
- Dewey Decimal: 642.092 22
- LC Class: ML419.K35 A3 2006

Sound Bites: Eating on Tour with Franz Ferdinand is a book written by Alex Kapranos from the band Franz Ferdinand. It was published on 2 November 2006.

In September 2005, whilst touring the world with Franz Ferdinand, Alex Kapranos had begun writing about what he ate in the various countries he had visited. The book concentrates heavily on where he eats and the people he eats with and the unusual flavours he tastes on the road. Much of the book is compiled from the column he had for The Guardian.

He said,

With my writing I literally wanted to give people a taste of what we had with my writing. There are a few things I wouldn't try again for example the raw sea urchin, that and bull testicles which I ate in Argentina, they were foul, the thought, the smell and the taste which was something like tuna on a bit of metal. In Scotland food has advanced and one of the biggest advances I think is that we've stopped looking outside for inspiration, I think maybe ten years ago the idea of good food had to be from somewhere else, had to be from Spain or France or Italy, whereas now we're realising we actually have some amazing stuff here.
