= Men's Needs, Women's Needs, Whatever =

Studio album by the Cribs
- Released: 21 May 2007
- Recorded: Autumn 2006 – Spring 2007
- Studio: The Warehouse Studio (Vancouver, British Columbia); Avatar (New York, New York)
- Genre: Britpop; indie rock
- Length: 42:23
- Label: Wichita; Warner Bros.
- Producer: Alex Kapranos

The Cribs chronology
The New Fellas (2005)	Men's Needs, Women's Needs, Whatever (2007)	Ignore The Ignorant (2009)

Singles from Men's Needs, Women's Needs, Whatever
- 1. "Men's Needs" Released: 14 May 2007; 2. "Moving Pictures" Released: 30 July 2007; 3. "Don't You Wanna Be Relevant? / Our Bovine Public" Released: 15 October 2007; 4. "I'm a Realist" Released: 25 February 2008

Professional ratings
Review scores
Source	Rating
AllMusic	4/5 stars
Drowned In Sound	9/10 stars
NME	8/10 stars
Okayplayer	3.5/5 stars
Pitchfork	(6.7/10)
Playlouder	4/5 stars
Robert Christgau	(3-star Honorable Mention)
Rolling Stone	4/5 stars

Men's Needs, Women's Needs, Whatever is the third studio album by English indie rock band the Cribs. It was released on 21 May 2007 through Wichita Recordings in the UK and Warner Bros. Records in the U.S. Critically acclaimed, the album propelled the band into a greater audience, reaching number thirteen on the UK Albums Chart, number nine on the annual 'Albums of the Year' by influential UK music magazine NME and various other end-of-year lists. The album's lead single, "Men's Needs", also reached number three in the same NME chart.

== Background and recording ==
At the conclusion of The New Fellas campaign, the Cribs signed a major label deal with Warner Bros. Records in North America, retaining Wichita Recordings in the UK and Ireland. Recording for the album began in autumn 2006 with Franz Ferdinand lead vocalist Alex Kapranos as producer at the Warehouse Studio, Vancouver, British Columbia. With the majority of the album recorded, the band undertook a run of small club dates to preview the new songs, captured on the accompanying Leave too Neat documentary. Further sessions took place at Avatar Studios, New York City in spring 2007, producing "Be Safe", a collaboration with Lee Ranaldo of Sonic Youth, and "Shoot the Poets", which closes the record. David Corcos engineered the sessions, whereas Andy Wallace mixed the record, with all the songs receiving mastering treatment at Alchemy, London, from John Davis.

== Composition ==
Rob Crane designed the cover and inlay artwork. The inlay features photography by Bert Hardy, Bob Taylor and Janette Beckman. The album features Gary on bass and vocals, Ross on drums and Ryan on guitar and vocals, and Lee Ranaldo performing spoken word for the track "Be Safe".

Musically, the album takes inspiration from indie rock, post-punk revival, punk rock and garage rock.

The albums lyrics explore a range of topics, from social commentary of their contemporary music scene 'Our Bovine Public', to social alienation 'Be Safe', to conflicts within romantic relationships 'I'm a Realist'.

== Singles ==
The album produced four singles: "Men's Needs" released on 14 May 2007, and "Moving Pictures" on 30 July. The double a-side "Don't You Wanna Be Relevant?"/"Our Bovine Public" introduced a new song recorded shortly after the album sessions finished on 15 October, and "I'm a Realist" closed the run of singles on 25 February 2008.

== Reissue ==
On July 29, 2022, The Cribs released reissues of their first three albums, the main reason for which was because the albums' vinyl editions had been out of print for some time. After regaining the rights and master tapes for the albums through the legal battle that caused the band's inactivity several years prior, they spent 2021 sifting through their archives for bonus material to include on the reissues. All three reissued albums entered the Top Ten of the midweek UK Albums Chart.

== Accolades ==
Publication	Accolade	Year	Rank
NME	Albums of the Year	2007	9
NME	Tracks of the year ('Men's Needs')	2007	3
Rolling Stone	Tracks of the year ('Men's Needs')	2007	57
NME Awards 2007	Album of the year	2007	nominated
NME Awards 2007	Single of the year ('Men's Needs')	2007	nominated

== Track listing ==
All tracks are written by Ryan Jarman, Gary Jarman and Ross Jarman except where noted.

No.	Title	Writer(s)	Length
1.	"Our Bovine Public"		2:17
2.	"Girls Like Mystery"		2:51
3.	"Men's Needs"		3:16
4.	"Moving Pictures"		3:10
5.	"I'm a Realist"		3:03
6.	"Major's Titling Victory"		2:45
7.	"Women's Needs"		4:34
8.	"I've Tried Everything"		2:46
9.	"My Life Flashed Before My Eyes"		3:30
10.	"Be Safe"	Ryan Jarman; G. Jarman; Ross Jarman; Lee Ranaldo	5:55
11.	"Ancient History"		4:49
12.	"Shoot the Poets"		3:27

Digital bonus track
No.	Title	Length
13.	"Fairer Sex"	2:55

Definitive Edition Disc 2
No.	Title	Writer(s)	Producer(s)	Length
1.	"It Happened So Fast" (Vancouver Version)		Alex Kapranos	3:12
2.	"To Jackson" (Vancouver Version)		Kapranos	3:05
3.	"Don't You Wanna Be Relevant?"		The Cribs; Will Jackson	3:01
4.	"Fairer Sex"		Kapranos	2:53
5.	"Tonight"		Kapranos	2:47
6.	"Get Yr Hands Out Of My Grave"		The Cribs; Will Jackson	3:38
7.	"Kind Words From The Broken Hearted"		The Cribs; Sebastian Lewsley	3:38
8.	"My Adolescent Dreams"		The Cribs; Sebastian Lewsley	2:29
9.	"Bastards of Young"	Paul Westerberg	Bernard Butler; The Cribs	3:39
10.	"I've Tried Everything" (Acoustic)			3:15
11.	"Men's Needs" (CSS Remix)		Kapranos; CSS	4:16
12.	"I'm a Realist" (The Postal Service Remix)		Kapranos; Jimmy Tamborello	3:05
13.	"Our Bovine Public" (Demo)			2:18
14.	"Men's Needs" (Demo)			3:13
15.	"Moving Pictures" (Demo)			3:13
16.	"I'm a Realist" (Demo)			3:03
17.	"MTV" (Demo)			2:48
18.	"My Life Flashed Before My Eyes" (Demo)			3:44
19.	"Ancient History" (Demo)			4:58
20.	"Tonight" (Demo)			2:57
21.	"I've Tried Everything" (Demo)			2:48
22.	"Shoot the Poets" (Demo)			4:07
23.	"Be Safe" (Rehearsal Tape for Lee)			7:17

== Charts ==
Chart (2007)	Peak position
UK Albums Chart	13

Chart (2022)	Peak position]
UK Independent Albums (OCC)	1

== Certifications ==
Certifications for Men's Needs, Women's Needs, Whatever
Region	Certification	Certified units/sales
United Kingdom (BPI)	Gold	100,000^{‡}
^{*} Sales figures based on certification alone.
