= Moving Pictures (The Cribs song) =

Single by The Cribs

from the album Men's Needs, Women's Needs, Whatever
- B-side: "Get Yr Hands Out of My Grave"; "Run a Mile"; "Men's Needs" (CSS remix); "Moving Pictures" (live at the Astoria); "Another Number" (live at the Astoria)
- Released: 30 July 2007
- Recorded: Vancouver, British Columbia
- Genre: Indie rock; alternative rock
- Length: 3:12
- Label: Wichita Recordings; Warner Bros. Records; Shock; Cooperative Music; Hostess
- Songwriters: Jarman, Jarman and Jarman
- Producer: Alex Kapranos

The Cribs singles chronology
"Men's Needs" (2007)	"Moving Pictures" (2007)	"Don't You Wanna Be Relevant? / Our Bovine Public" (2007)

"Moving Pictures" arrived in July 2007 as the second single taken from the third studio album by British indie rock band The Cribs. The single, which found release on the Men's Needs, Women's Needs, Whatever LP, provided listeners with several new songs across different formats on 30 July 2007. Recorded at the Warehouse Studio in Vancouver, British Columbia with Franz Ferdinand vocalist and guitarist Alex Kapranos, the song received additional treatment at Alchemy, London, United Kingdom.

== Physical release ==
The song received a physical release in numerous forms, through two seven inch records and a CD single, in addition to digital download. Frequent band collaborator Nick Scott designed the sleeve, which Ross used on his drums in subsequent performances that year, and featured the catalogue numbers 'WEBB128S', 'WEBB128SX' and 'WEBB128SCD'.

== B-sides ==
Two new recordings appeared on the CD single version. First, produced by the Cribs and Will Jackson and recorded at Soundworks Studios, Leeds, came "Get Yr Hands Out of My Grave", whereas "Run a Mile" dates to a 2002 demo performed by Ryan at Springtime Studios, Wakefield. Previous single "Men's Needs" received the remix treatment from CSS) on the first vinyl, with two live tracks taken from the Astoria, "Moving Pictures" and "Another Number", dating to May 2007 on the second vinyl.

== Miscellaneous ==
The promotional video received significant airplay on MTV Two in their 'Spanking New Music' feature throughout summer 2007. The song went on to reach number thirty-eight on the UK Singles Chart.

== Critical reception ==
Heather Phares of Allmusic noted that "Ryan Jarman often sounds like a British Rivers Cuomo, especially on Moving Pictures".

== Track listing ==
All tracks are written by Gary Jarman, Ross Jarman and Ryan Jarman.

CD single
No.	Title	Length
1.	"Moving Pictures"	3:12
2.	"Get Yr Hands Out of My Grave"	3:41
3.	"Run a Mile"	2:15

7" vinyl one
No.	Title	Length
1.	"Moving Pictures"	3:12
2.	"Men's Needs" (CSS Remix)	4:13

7" vinyl two
No.	Title	Length
1.	"Moving Pictures" (live at the Astoria)	3:03
2.	"Another Number" (live at the Astoria)	3:09
