= The Karelia =

Scottish musical ensemble

- Origin: Glasgow, Scotland
- Genres: Jazz, rock
- Years active: 1996–1998
- Labels: Sum Records
- Past members: Alex Huntley; Glen Thompson; Alan Wylie; Tassos Bobos; Thom Falls

The Karelia were a short-lived Scottish rock and roll band formed in 1996 by vocalist Alex Kapranos, before he founded the group Franz Ferdinand.

== History ==
The Karelia formed in 1996 from the original rock/jazz band The Blisters, with Huntley, Alan Wylie, Glen Thomson and Thom Falls (later replaced by the Greek drummer Tassos Bobos). Their sound has been described as "prog/techno rock with Iggy-voxed overtones", and "jazzy film-noir lo-fi".

The band's only album, Divorce At High Noon, was released in 1997 on Sum Records to little acclaim. Produced by Bid of The Monochrome Set, it was an off the wall mix of rock and jazz trumpet with unusual lyrics. The final song, "Garavurghty Butes", was completely freestyle with improvised lyrics and musical arrangement.

The band did not tour and was unknown outside Glasgow. Their album sold only a few hundred copies, and the band split in 1998 after contributing to an EP for the Guided Missile label.

Upon the success of Franz Ferdinand, fans began to exchange originals of Divorce at High Noon for £50-£100. Because of this, the album was re-released in February 2005. It featured all of the previous album and two bonus tracks.

The band's name derives from the Greek tobacco company Karelia. Karelia is also an area in Northern Europe, currently divided between Russia and Finland.

== Line-up ==
The Karelia were:

- Alex Huntley (currently Alex Kapranos) on vocals, guitar, bouzouki and banjolele,
- Glen Thompson on bass guitar and percussion,
- Alan Wylie on trumpet,
- Thom Falls on drums.

== Discography ==
=== Albums ===
- Divorce At High Noon (1997) Sum Records:
1. "Divorce At High Noon"
2. "Love's A Cliché"
3. "Say Try"
4. "To His Coy Dietress"
5. "Life In A Barrat Garret"
6. "Crazy Irritation"
7. "Remorse At High Noon"
8. "Dancing Along To Nekrotaphion"
9. "The Devil Rides Hyndland"
10. "The Infinite Duration"
11. "Nostalgia"
12. "Tension"
13. "Bleach Yours"
14. "Exaggeration"
15. "Garavurghty Butes" - incl. hidden track "Love's A Cliché (Reprise)"

reissued (2005) with bonus tracks:

1. "Divorce At High Noon" (French Version)
2. "Love's A Cliché" (Single Version)
3. "Love's A Cliché" (video)
