= Revolt (song) =

Single by Muse

from the album Drones
- Released: 4 November 2015
- Recorded: 2014
- Studio: The Warehouse Studio (Vancouver, British Columbia)
- Genre: Pop rock; alternative rock; arena rock
- Length: 4:05
- Label: Warner Bros.; Helium-3
- Songwriter: Matt Bellamy
- Producers: Mutt Lange; Muse

Muse singles chronology
"Mercy" (2015)	"Revolt" (2015)	"Aftermath" (2016)

"Revolt" is a song by the English rock band Muse, released as the third single from their seventh studio album, Drones (2015).

== Composition ==
"Revolt" has been described as pop rock, alternative rock and arena rock.

In his review of the album, Gigwise's Andrew Trendell called the song a "squelchy synth-fuelled call to arms and power ballad for the space-age, somewhere between Bryan Adams, Journey and Eurovision". The NME's Mark Beaumont described the song as "a two-speed storm built on monumental riffs".

== Music video ==
The "theatrical" video features the band "performing against a backdrop of dystopian warfare between man and drone". Shot in Prague, the band "wanted the video in black and white only using color to represent revolution". The video was made available on Apple Music, while a 'Virtual Reality' version can be viewed on vrse.com. The video is in 360°.

== Reception ==
Reaction to the song was mixed. While NME's Mark Beaumont ranked "Revolt" among the band's "most creative songs", Consequence of Sound's Collin Brennan likened it to the "overblown theatrics of Queen". Calling it "a catchy, occasionally rousing song with a couple of neat tricks up its sleeve", he concludes that the song ultimately fails to be the "convincing call to action" it seemingly intends to be.

== Charts ==
Chart (2015)	Peak position
Belgium (Ultratip Bubbling Under Flanders)	20
Belgium (Ultratip Bubbling Under Wallonia)	19
