= Reapers (song) =

Single by Muse

from the album Drones
- Released: 16 April 2016
- Recorded: 2014
- Studio: The Warehouse Studio (Vancouver, British Columbia)
- Genre: Progressive metal
- Length: 5:59
- Label: Warner Bros.; Helium-3
- Songwriter: Matt Bellamy
- Producers: Mutt Lange; Muse

Muse singles chronology
"Aftermath" (2016)	"Reapers" (2016)	"Dig Down" (2017)

"Reapers" is a song by English rock band Muse, first released as the second promotional single off their seventh studio album Drones, and later as a 7" single, as part of Record Store Day, on 16 April 2016, the fifth and final single from the album. The song peaked at No. 75 on the French Singles Chart, No. 71 on the Swiss Hitparade singles chart, No. 37 on Billboard's Hot Rock Songs, and became Muse's highest-charting single at the time on Billboard's Mainstream Rock Songs at No. 2; it has since been surpassed on the latter chart by "Won't Stand Down", which reached No. 1 in May 2022.

== Release ==
"Reapers" was released a promotional single for Drones on 29 May 2015. It was released as a Record Store Day 7" picture disc vinyl on 16 April 2016. The A-side consists of the song's album version, while the B-side consists of a live performance at the Gloria Theater in Köln, Germany. The release also includes a fold-your-own paper plane (marketed as a "paper drone").

== Music video ==
A lyric video for the song was uploaded to the band's official YouTube channel on 29 May 2015. A full video followed. Rolling Stone called it "brutal and chilling ... fittingly blunt, depicting a man caught in the crosshairs of a drone and running for his life while a woman with red lipstick waits to pull the trigger."

== Critical reception ==
In an album review for The Observer, Kitty Empire commented that the pacy song "exposes the overlap between the unfeeling destruction of drone warfare and the unfeeling destruction wrought by people tearing each other apart," referring to Muse frontman Matt Bellamy's break-up from fiancée Kate Hudson. She also compared Bellamy to Yngwie Malmsteen, noting that the song contains "meaty riffs."

== Track listing ==
=== Digital download ===
Digital download
No.	Title	Length
1.	"Reapers"	5:59

=== 7" vinyl ===
Side A
No.	Title	Length
1.	"Reapers"	5:59

Side B
No.	Title	Length
1.	"Reapers" (Live in Köln)	5:59

== Personnel ==
Personnel adapted from single liner notes.

- Tom Bailey – assistant engineer
- Matt Bellamy – composing
- Mario Borgatta – mix assistant
- Marc Carolan – engineering, mixing (live version)
- Tommasa Colliva – engineering, additional production
- Martin Cooke – assistant mixer
- Rich Costey – additional production, mixing
- Jacopo Dorici – assistant engineer
- Nick Fourier – assistant mixer
- Robert John "Mutt" Lange – production
- Eric Mosher – assistant engineer
- Muse – production
- John Prestage – assistant engineer
- Olle Romo – additional programming
- Giuseppe Salvadori – assistant engineer
- Giovanni Versari – mastering (album and live version)

== Charts ==
Chart (2015–16)	Peak position
Belgium (Ultratip Bubbling Under Flanders)	45
Canada Rock (Billboard)	39
France (SNEP)	75
Switzerland (Schweizer Hitparade)	71
UK Singles (Official Charts Company)	127
US Hot Rock & Alternative Songs (Billboard)	37
US Mainstream Rock (Billboard)	2
