= Alex Kapranos =

Scottish musician (born 1972)

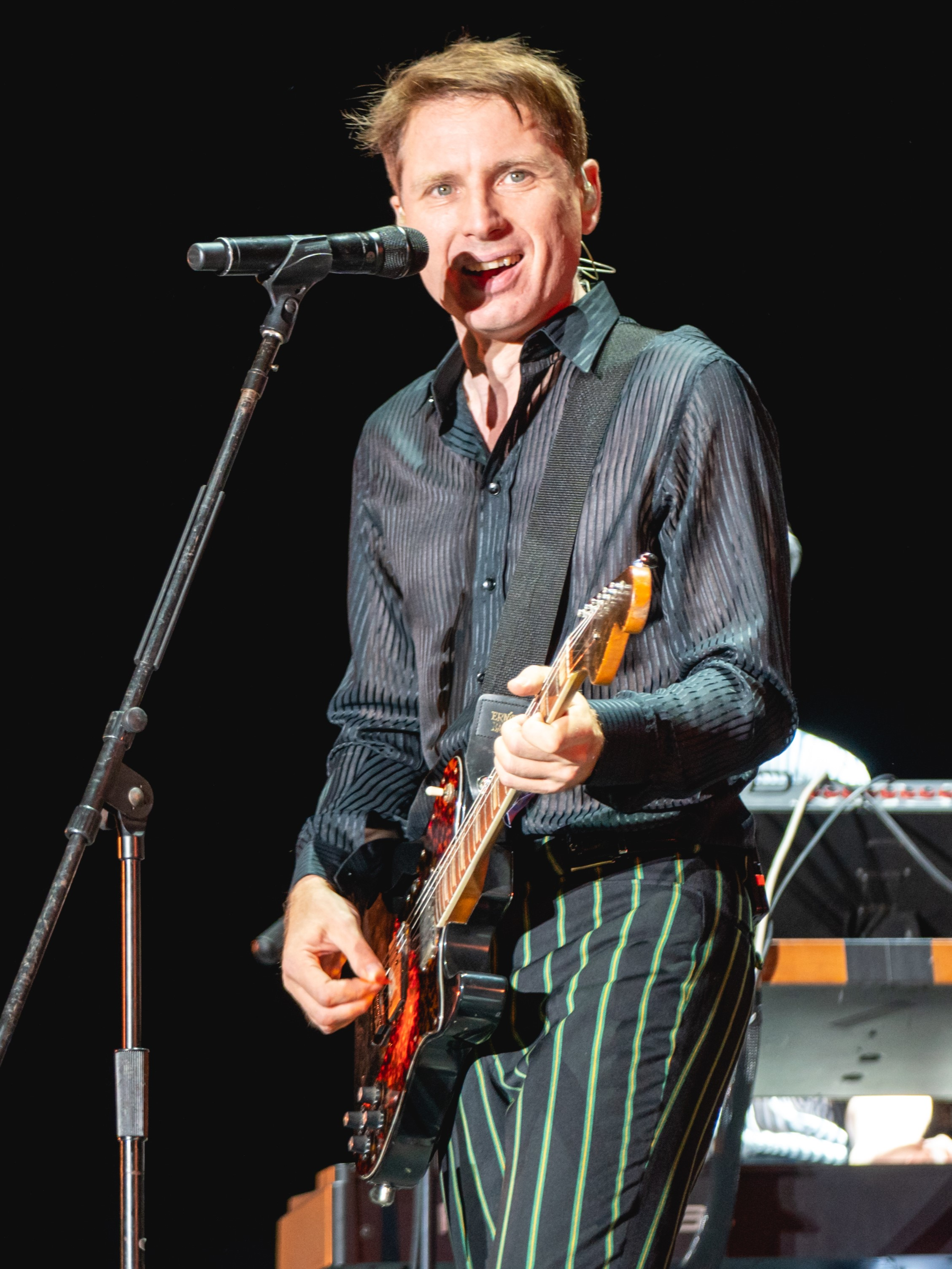
- Kapranos performing with Franz Ferdinand in 2019

Background information
- Born: Alexander Paul Kapranos Huntley; 20 March 1972 (age 54); Almondsbury, Gloucestershire, England
- Origin: Glasgow, Scotland
- Genres: Indie rock; post-punk revival; dance-punk; art rock
- Occupations: Musician; singer; songwriter; record producer; author
- Instruments: Vocals; guitar; bass guitar; keyboards
- Years active: 1991–present
- Label: Domino
- Member of: Franz Ferdinand
- Formerly of: The Karelia; The Yummy Fur; The Amphetameanies; FFS; BNQT
- Spouse: Clara Luciani (m. 2023)
- Website: franzferdinand.com
- Children: 1

Alexander Paul Kapranos (born 20 March 1972) is an English-Greek musician born in England who moved to Scotland as a child. He is the lead vocalist and guitarist of Scottish rock band Franz Ferdinand. He has also been a part of the supergroups FFS and BNQT.

== Early life ==
Alexander Paul Kapranos Huntley was born on 20 March 1972 in Almondsbury, South Gloucestershire, the son of an English mother and Greek father. As a two-month-old he moved to Sunderland, moving to Scotland when he was a child. He attended Bearsden Academy, then the University of Aberdeen to study Theology. After dropping out, he continued studying at the University of Strathclyde, gaining a BA. In 2005, he was awarded Strathclyde's Alumnus of the Year.

Kapranos worked as a chef, barman, waiter and delivery driver prior to his success in music. From the early 1990s, he was a fixture of the Glasgow music scene, running live nights at The 13th Note Café, most notably The Kazoo Club.

== Career ==
=== Performing ===
While working at the Glasgow's Anniesland College in late 1990s, Alex Kapranos played in some of his city's bands, including the Blisters (later known as the Karelia), the Amphetameanies, and the Yummy Fur. He also contributed to the noise rock band Urusei Yatsura and Lung Leg recordings.

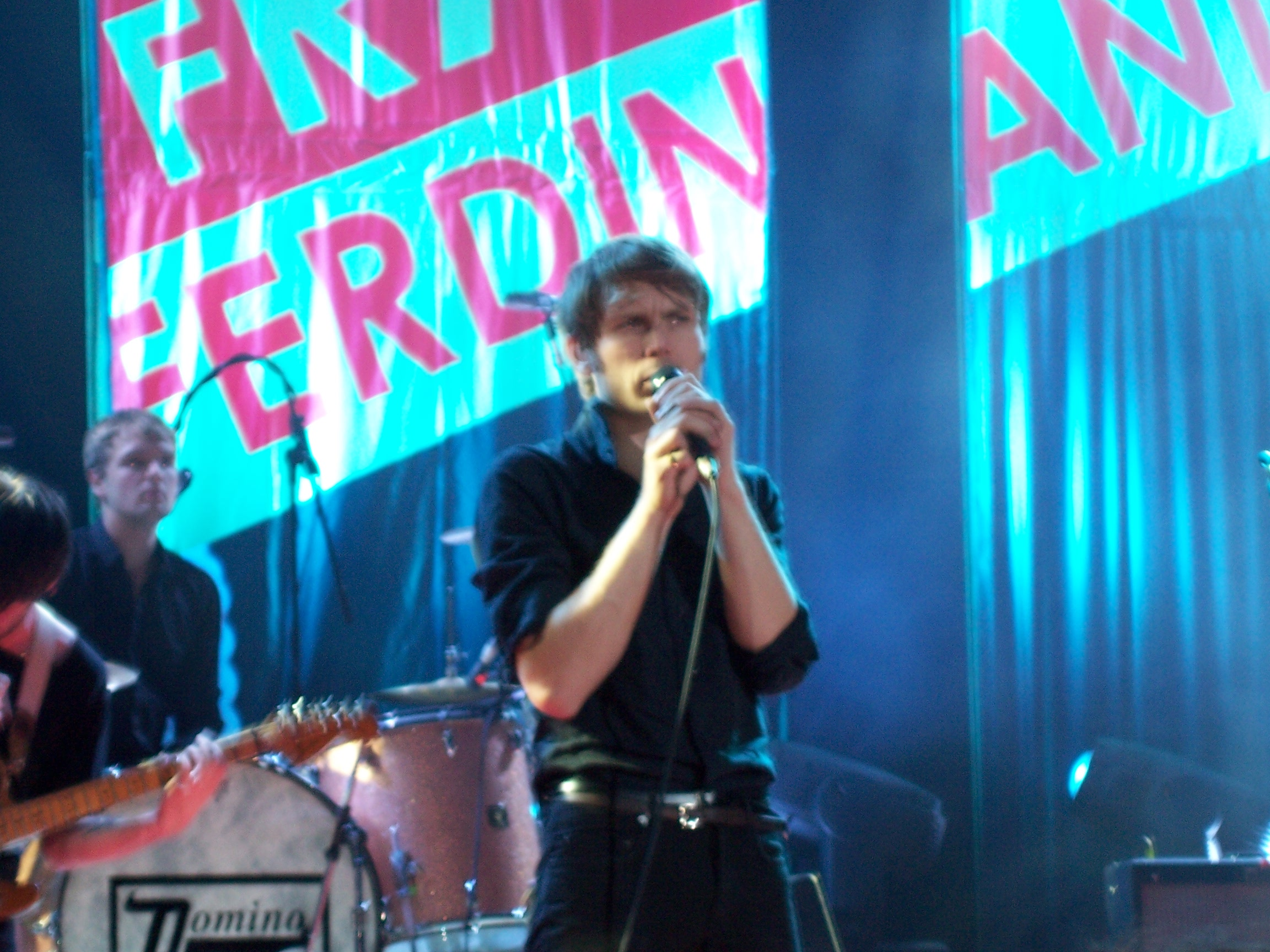
Kapranos performing with Franz Ferdinand in October 2005

After dropping "Huntley" from his name, Kapranos formed Franz Ferdinand in 2001. The band was composed of Kapranos, Nick McCarthy (rhythm guitar, keyboards, vocals), Paul Thomson (drums, backing vocals) and Bob Hardy (bass). The band saw chart success after their second single "Take Me Out" was released on 12 January 2004 and reached number 3 in the UK Charts; it was followed by their debut album Franz Ferdinand (released 9 February 2004), which debuted on the UK album chart at Number 3.

The band went on to win the 2004 Mercury Music Prize and two Brit Awards in 2005 for Best British Group and Best British Rock Act.

In 2015, the Franz Ferdinand collaborated with American band Sparks to form a supergroup named FFS.

Also in 2015, Kapranos joined the supergroup BNQT.

In 2019, British band All We Are released a single "Heart Attack" with Alex Kapranos.

In 2020, Kapranos released an English-French cover of "Summer Wine" with Clara Luciani.

=== Producing ===
Kapranos produced Men's Needs, Women's Needs, Whatever—the third album by British indie rock group The Cribs in Vancouver, B.C., released on 14 May 2007. He also produced their single-only track "Don't You Wanna Be Relevant?", which was featured with "Our Bovine Public" (from Men's Needs, Women's Needs, Whatever) as a double A-side.

Kapranos makes a cameo appearance in the video for "Our Bovine Public".

His remix of the single "New in Town" by British pop singer Little Boots was featured on various formats of the singles release.

He produced the debut album by British indie rock band Citizens!, Here We Are, which was released by Kitsuné on 28 May 2012.

He produced the second album of Scottish guitarist RM Hubbert, Thirteen Lost & Found. In 2019, he produced the single "Pista (Great Start)" by London-based band Los Bitchos, which he described thus: "Truly international with cumbia beats, Turkish psychedelia, a hint of Swedish pop and a touch of shoegaze shimmer. More than anything, they put you in a really good mood when you listen to them. Celebratory trills and whoops energise the vibrant Dick Dale-esque guitars and brass, making for a blistering escape to a rip-roaring desert session."

== Other work ==
=== Writing ===
In September 2005, Kapranos began "Soundbites", a weekly food column for G2 in The Guardian newspaper, which detailed his culinary adventures as Franz Ferdinand traversed the globe on their world tour. Sound Bites: Eating on Tour with Franz Ferdinand, a book of the column and unreleased material illustrated by Andy Knowles, was released in 2006.

Sound Bites: Eating on Tour with Franz Ferdinand was read by Kapranos on BBC Radio 4's Book of the Week for 4–8 December 2006, described as "his account about what he ate while touring the world."

=== Narration ===
Kapranos narrated the 2008 BBC Scotland documentary Edwyn Collins: Home Again on the recovery of Orange Juice singer Edwyn Collins.

Also in 2008, Kapranos narrated the BBC Radio 1 documentary The Story of Kraftwerk.

=== Film ===
In 2016, Kapranos took part in a documentary about Glasgow music, and Chemikal Underground Records, called Lost in France. The film was directed by Niall McCann and brought Kapranos (along with members of The Delgados, Mogwai and others) to Mauron, Brittany, to recreate a gig they played when Kapranos was in his earlier band, The Karelia. The film features Kapranos playing live with Stuart Braithwaite of Mogwai, and other musicians such as Emma Pollock and RM Hubbert, and Holy Mountain, as well as interviews with Kapranos and his old label-mates. Lost in France premiered at the Edinburgh International Film Festival to wholly positive reviews and was called "Funny, vital and sobering" by Scotland's arts publication, The Skinny.

Kapranos was interviewed for Edgar Wright's 2021 documentary film The Sparks Brothers, centered around the band Sparks, with whom Franz Ferdinand formed supergroup FFS.

=== Radio presenting ===
From 7 August to 11 September 2022, Kapranos presented a six part Sunday night radio programme titled "The Alex Kapranos Show" on Absolute Radio.

== Personal life ==
In his spare time, Kapranos enjoys "crafting abstract furniture in his carpentry workshop".

In June 2005, Kapranos was detained for around an hour by officials at Domodedovo Airport in Moscow after being mistakenly identified as belonging on a U.S. "no-fly" list. This occurred due to the surname on his passport, Huntley, also having been previously used as an alias by the former MI6 agent Richard Tomlinson. Tomlinson had been fired, imprisoned, and labelled a security risk after circulating to publishers a draft of a book on MI6. Kapranos was released after officials determined that he did not fit Tomlinson's description.

Growing up in Sunderland, he supported the local football club Sunderland A.F.C.

Kapranos has asthma and has a peanut allergy.

Kapranos dated singer Eleanor Friedberger for a few years (he dedicated the song "Eleanor Put Your Boots On" to her).

Since 2019, he has been in a relationship with French musician Clara Luciani. Luciani announced her pregnancy with the couple's first child in May 2023. They married in Scotland at the end of May 2023. Their son was born in September 2023.

== Discography ==
=== Singles ===
| Year | Title | Album |
|---|---|---|
| 2019 | "Heart Attack" (All We Are & Alex Kapranos) | Non-album singles |
| 2020 | "Summer Wine" (Alex Kapranos & Clara Luciani) | Non-album singles |
