= Drones (album) =

2015 studio album by Muse

- The cover art of the album, which was made by Matt Mahurin.

Studio album by Muse
- Released: 5 June 2015
- Recorded: October 2014 – April 2015
- Studios: The Warehouse (Vancouver); Officine Meccaniche (Milan)
- Genres: Alternative rock; progressive rock; hard rock; progressive metal
- Length: 52:44
- Labels: Warner Bros.; Helium-3
- Producers: Mutt Lange; Muse

Muse chronology
Live at Rome Olympic Stadium (2013)	Drones (2015)	Simulation Theory (2018)

Singles from Drones
- 1. "Dead Inside" Released: 23 March 2015; 2. "Mercy" Released: 18 May 2015; 3. "Revolt" Released: 4 November 2015; 4. "Aftermath" Released: 11 March 2016; 5. "Reapers" Released: 16 April 2016

Drones is the seventh studio album by the English rock band Muse, released on 5 June 2015 through Warner Bros. Records and the band's own Helium-3 imprint. The album was recorded between October 2014 and April 2015 at the Warehouse Studio in Vancouver, with orchestral sections recorded at Officine Meccaniche in Milan, and was produced by the band and Mutt Lange. Drones is a concept album following a soldier's abandonment, indoctrination as a "human drone", and eventual defection. It also comments on the Obama administration's drone program. After their previous albums incorporated orchestral and electronic music, Muse aimed to return to a more straightforward rock sound musically.

Drones received mixed-to-positive reviews from critics, who praised its instrumentation but criticised its concept and lyrics. It topped 21 international charts, including the UK Albums Chart (where it became Muse's fifth consecutive number-one album) and the US Billboard 200. It sold over a million copies worldwide in 2015, making it the year's 19th-bestselling album. At the 58th Annual Grammy Awards, it won the award for Best Rock Album. The album was listed on 41 in the NME albums of the year 2015. Diffuser.fm named it the 42nd best of the year. Rolling Stone named it the 39th best of the year.

It was supported by an expansive world tour with appearances at several festivals and arenas, lasting from 2015 to 2016 and grossing $88.5 million from 132 shows. A concert film of the tour, entitled Muse: Drones World Tour, was released in cinemas in July 2018.

== Background ==
On their previous albums The Resistance (2009) and The 2nd Law (2012), Muse incorporated orchestral and electronic music. In December 2013, they released the live album and video Live at Rome Olympic Stadium; songwriter Matt Bellamy said the band wanted the release "to capture some of the extremes of what we've been doing since we want to go in a different direction in the future."

Muse began writing their seventh album soon after the Rome concert. Bellamy stated that the album "should be something that really does strip away the additional things that we've experimented with on the last two albums... I kind of feel like it will be nice to reconnect and remind ourselves of just the basics of who we are." The band felt the electronic side of their music was becoming too dominant. According to bassist Chris Wolstenholme, some of the music on The 2nd Law was "somewhat of a bore to play live, and I'm not too certain how much of it worked for our shows ... The logical step was to strip away all the outer layers and go back to the way we started. Sometimes, making things simpler makes them more powerful."

== Recording ==
In October 2014, Muse entered the Warehouse Studio in Vancouver. After having self-produced their previous two albums, Muse worked with producer Mutt Lange to spend less time mixing and reviewing takes and focus on performance. Tommaso Colliva and Rich Costey served as additional producers. After having used several different bass guitars and effect pedals for The 2nd Law, Wolstenholme used only one bass guitar and a small number of pedals, hoping to find a cohesive sound.

The first recording session ended on 19 October, with the band calling it "emotional". Muse re-entered the studio in November 2014. On 1 April 2015, drummer Dominic Howard and mixer Rich Costey indicated on their Instagram accounts that they had finished mixing the album. The result was a simpler, more consistent rock sound with less elaborate production and genre experimentation.

== Composition ==
Drones has been described as featuring alternative rock, hard rock, progressive rock, and progressive metal. It is a concept album about the dehumanisation of modern warfare. The story begins with "Dead Inside", where the protagonist loses hope and becomes vulnerable to the dark forces of "Psycho". He eventually defects, revolts and overcomes his enemies.

Answering fan questions on Twitter in September 2014, Bellamy said the album's themes include deep ecology, the empathy gap, and World War III. In March 2015, he said:

To me, drones are metaphorical psychopaths which enable psychopathic behaviour with no recourse. The world is run by drones utilising drones to turn us all into drones. This album explores the journey of a human, from their abandonment and loss of hope, to their indoctrination by the system to be a human drone, to their eventual defection from their oppressors.

In an interview in the same month, Bellamy described Drones as "a modern metaphor for what it is to lose empathy ... through modern technology, and obviously through drone warfare in particular, it's possible to actually do quite horrific things by remote control, at a great distance, without actually feeling any of the consequences, or even feeling responsible in some way."

== Promotion and release ==
On 26 January 2015, Muse revealed the album title in an Instagram video featuring a mixing desk with audio samples and a screen stating "Artist – Muse, Album – Drones." They also began using the hashtag "#MuseDrones" on Twitter and Instagram. On 6 February, American artist Matt Mahurin announced he had created artwork for the album. On 8 March, the band shared a snippet of the new song "Psycho" and mentioned "mixing with a very tight deadline".

On 12 March, Muse released a lyric video for "Psycho" on their YouTube channel, and made the song available for download with the album pre-order. Critics have described "Psycho" as a hard rock and glam rock song with elements of nu metal.

On 23 March, "Dead Inside" was released as the album's lead single with a lyric video on Muse's YouTube channel. On 18 May, Muse released a lyric video for "Mercy" and released the song on Spotify. On 29 May, a lyric video for "Reapers" was released on YouTube, followed by "The Handler" on 2 June and "[JFK]" with "Defector" on 3 June.

In an album review for The Observer, Kitty Empire commented that the pacy song "Reapers" "exposes the overlap between the unfeeling destruction of drone warfare and the unfeeling destruction wrought by people tearing each other apart," referring to Muse frontman Matt Bellamy's break-up from fiancée Kate Hudson. She also compared Bellamy to Yngwie Malmsteen, noting that the song contains "meaty riffs."

Drones was released on 5 June 2015 in Europe and 8 June in the United Kingdom under Warner Bros. Records and Helium-3. On 3 November, Muse released "Revolt" as the third single from the album along with a music video on iTunes. The fourth single "Aftermath" was released on 11 March 2016; further, on 16 April, the final single "Reapers" was released as a 7" single for Record Store Day.

== Tour ==
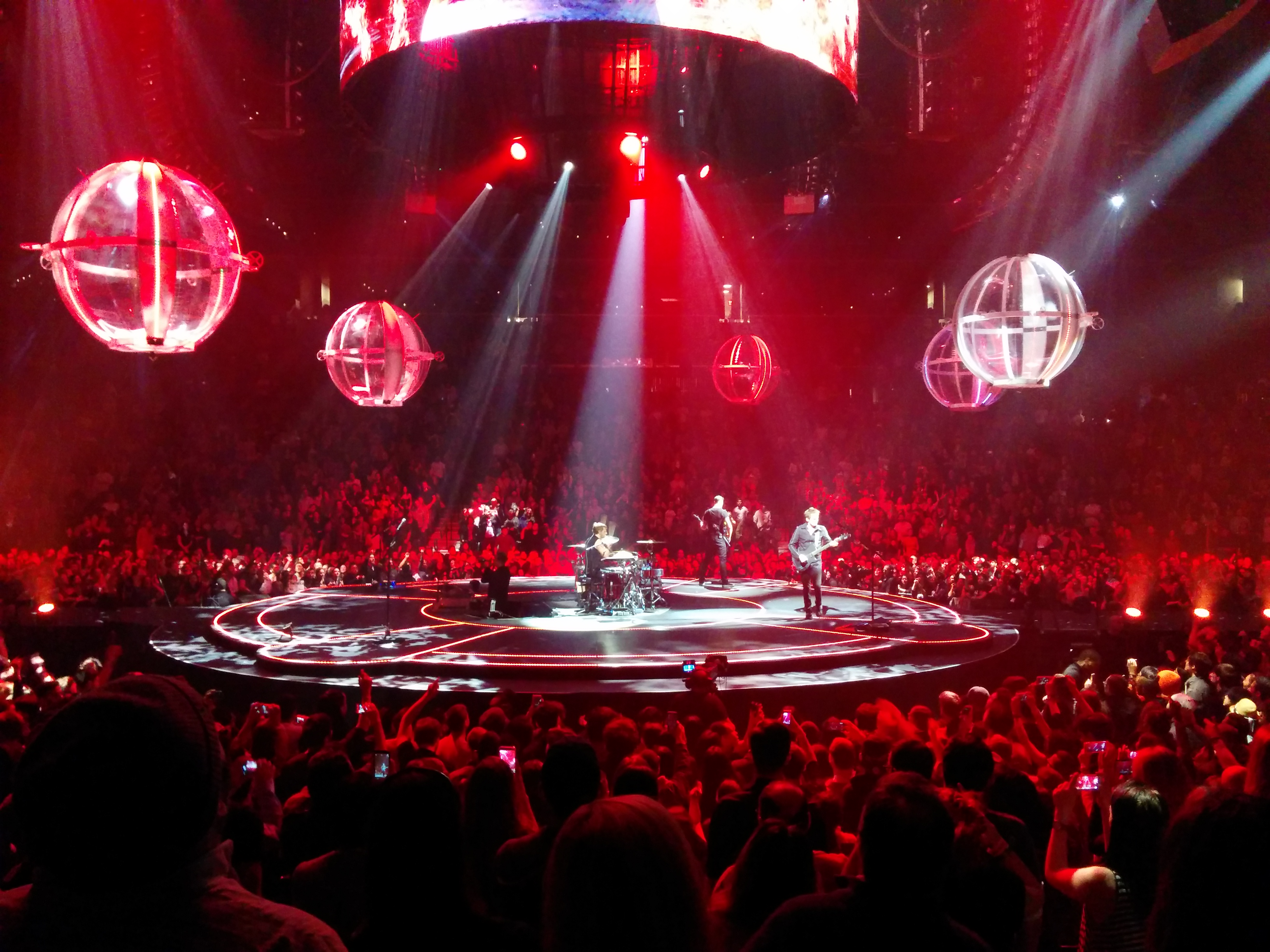
The band performing in Brooklyn, New York on 27 January 2016.

From 15 to 24 March 2015, the band played the Psycho Tour, six concerts in small venues in the UK. Starting with Radio 1's Big Weekend in May 2015, the band embarked on the Drones World Tour in support of the album, which led to the release of the live video Muse: Drones World Tour. Bellamy confirmed they would tour North America in late 2015 and Europe in 2016, and also said they would be flying drones over the audience during the shows. However, two concerts in San Diego and Las Vegas were rescheduled due to "technical and logistical" challenges, while the drones were not used at all in three gigs, and one gig in Detroit saw several drones fail simultaneously. The tour was first hinted at by guitarist and lead vocalist Matt Bellamy's Twitter on March 10, 2015, with the tour being officially announced the next day on the band's Facebook page, along with the lyric video for "Psycho".

The dynamics of this tour were different from what Muse had used in the past few tours, where they relied heavily on theatrical stage-craft and production, this tour took the band into smaller venues around the UK and the United States, the stage design was only a simple lighting rig and, for all but one concert, a backdrop displaying the cover art of their upcoming album. The band had not played in many of the venues since the Origin of Symmetry tour which took place from 2001 to 2002. The band was supported by Marmozets on the tour. Part of the tour also took place outside the UK in the United States.

In May 2015, the band embarked on the Drones World Tour in support of the album, which led to the release of the live video Muse: Drones World Tour. Bellamy confirmed they would tour North America in late 2015 and Europe in 2016, and also said they would be flying drones over the audience during the shows. However, two concerts in San Diego and Las Vegas were rescheduled due to "technical and logistical" challenges, while the drones were not used at all in three gigs, and one gig in Detroit saw several drones fail simultaneously. During the first leg of the tour, the band had their debut performance at Download Festival, which they also headlined. The new tour stage set up featured 11 LED pillars which could be manually pushed back and forth by members of the crew to accommodate the show. Bellamy compared this set up to The Resistance tour on his Instagram. An updated version of this set was used for the remaining dates in 2017, complete with new lighting rigs and lasers.

== Reception ==
Professional ratings
Aggregate scores
Source	Rating
AnyDecentMusic?	5.7/10
Metacritic	63/100
Review scores
Source	Rating
AllMusic	4/5 stars
The Daily Telegraph	4/5 stars
Entertainment Weekly	C
The Guardian	3/5 stars
Los Angeles Times	1.5/4 stars
NME	7/10
Pitchfork	4.5/10
Q	4/5 stars
Rolling Stone	4/5 stars
Spin	5/10

At Metacritic, which assigns a rating out of 100 to reviews from mainstream critics, Drones has an average score of 63 based on 25 reviews. Kerrang! gave Drones a perfect score, calling it "a claustrophobic classic that sharpens the focus of what is possible in the name of high-minded rock." Q wrote that despite Muse's stated goal of returning to their roots, "Drones is anything but back-to-basics garage rock... befitting of its proggy conceptual narrative about state mind control, it's an album of rambling interests." David Fricke of Rolling Stone called the album "a truly guilty pleasure" and praised its "chunky update of the guitar-bass-drums charge" of the band's earlier albums as "what Muse do best." The NME wrote that the album's "trademark Muse themes of brainwashing, warmongering superpowers, suppression of The Truth and the urgent need to fight the hand that bleeds us still resonate in 2015, but obliquely ... Muse's music once more matches [Bellamy's] adventurous intrigue."

AllMusic wrote that "it's hard to avoid [Muse's] conclusion that war is bad, but this inclination to write everything in bold, italicized capital letters is an asset when it comes to music." Kitty Empire of The Observer wrote that despite the "trite" lyrics and "confusing" plot, some of Drones was "fist-pumpingly ace; a timely restatement of the need for popular music to evoke both thought and dopamine rush." Ian Cohen of Pitchfork found that Drones lacked subtlety and criticised its lyrics, writing, "Whatever pleasure can be generated from Bellamy's admirable melodic sense and overblown hooks is negated by Muse's insistence that they're profound rather than fun." Oliver Keens of Time Out London called the album's handling of the drones subject matter "tactless and crass" and its story "as dull as dog food – told with the wishy-washy flim-flam of a frothing conspiracy theorist ... We used to moan that musicians didn't write about politics anymore. Based on this effort, maybe that's for the best." Rolling Stone named it the 38th best album of 2015, calling it a "searing commentary on our era's vague dread, computer-driven death from above and Orwellian political climate ... It was the year's most convincing howl from the abyss."

The Daily Telegraph wrote that "It's more than a little Spinal Tap, but if I was a teenage boy this is exactly the kind of thrilling madness that might turn me on to a moribund genre." The Evening Standard gave it four out of five and wrote: "Prog phobics might dismiss it as latter-day Pink Floyd with a dash of Noam Chomsky. But Bellamy's maturing songwriting has become more accessible, less prone to bluster. Drones is the fearsome sound of Muse at their monumental best."

== Commercial performance ==
On the UK Albums Chart, Drones debuted at number one with sales of 72,863 copies, the third-highest opening of 2015 up to that point. It was Muse's fifth consecutive number-one album in the UK. It remained at number one in the second week, selling 24,445 copies (996 from streaming), bringing total sales to 97,308. It sold one million copies worldwide in 2015 and was the 19th best-selling album of the year. By 2016, it had sold approximately 170,000 copies in UK, 230,000 copies in the US, and 192,000 copies in France.

Drones debuted at number one on the US Billboard 200 in the week ending 14 June, earning 84,200 album-equivalent units in its first week (including 79,400 copies on traditional sales, 26,000 on single sales and 3.3 million on single streams), surpassing estimations. It replaced Florence and the Machine's How Big, How Blue, How Beautiful at the top, marking the first time that two British artists had debuted consecutively at number one in the US since 1956. Its traditional sales took Drones to number one of the Top Album Sales chart.

== Track listing ==
All lyrics are written by Matt Bellamy; all music is composed by Bellamy, except where noted

Drones – Standard edition
No.	Title	Music	Length
1.	"Dead Inside"		4:22
2.	"[Drill Sergeant]"		0:21
3.	"Psycho"		5:16
4.	"Mercy"		3:51
5.	"Reapers"		5:59
6.	"The Handler"		4:33
7.	"[JFK]"		0:54
8.	"Defector"		4:33
9.	"Revolt"		4:05
10.	"Aftermath"		5:47
11.	"The Globalist"	Bellamy; Edward Elgar	10:07
12.	"Drones"	Bellamy; Giovanni Pierluigi da Palestrina	2:49
Total length:			52:40

Drones – Deluxe edition (DVD)
No.	Title	Length
1.	"Psycho" (Live at Glasgow Barrowlands)	5:44
2.	"Dead Inside" (Live at Brighton Dome)	4:38
3.	"The Handler" (Soundcheck, Exeter Great Hall)	4:45
4.	"Reapers" (Live at Exeter Great Hall)	6:18
5.	"Bonus Studio Footage – The Globalist / Defector"	10:00
Total length:		32:57

Notes

- "The Globalist" contains music based on "Nimrod" from the Enigma Variations, composed by Edward Elgar.
- "Drones" contains music based on the "Benedictus" from Missa Papae Marcelli, composed by Giovanni Pierluigi da Palestrina.

== Personnel ==
Personnel taken from album liner notes, except where noted.

Muse

- Matt Bellamy – lead and backing vocals, guitars, piano, synthesisers, vocoder, string arrangements, production
- Chris Wolstenholme – bass guitar, backing vocals, production
- Dominic Howard – drums, production

Technical personnel

- Mutt Lange – production; additional backing vocals ("Aftermath")
- Rich Costey – additional production, mixing
- Tommaso Colliva – additional production, engineering
- Adam Greenholtz – additional engineering
- Eric Mosher – engineering assistance
- Giuseppe Salvadori – engineering assistance
- Jacopo Dorici – engineering assistance
- John Prestage – engineering assistance
- Tom Bailey – engineering assistance
- Marlo Borgatta – mixing assistance
- Giovanni Versari – mastering
- Bob Ludwig – mastering ("Dead Inside")
- Matt Colton – mastering (vinyl half speed)
- Olle "Sven" Romo – additional programming
- Durand Trench – dialogue recording ("[Drill Sergeant]" and "Psycho")
- Audrey Riley – string arrangements, conductor
- Matt Mahurin – art direction, illustration, package design

Additional musicians and performers

- Will Leon Thompson – dialogue (Drill Sergeant) ("[Drill Sergeant]" and "Psycho")
- Michael Shiloah – dialogue (Recruit) ("[Drill Sergeant]" and "Psycho")
- John F. Kennedy – recorded dialogue of April 1961 Secret Societies speech ("[JFK]")
- Alessandro Cortini – modular synthesisers
- Edoardo De Angelis – concertmaster, violin
- Sarah Cross – violin
- Freiherr von Dellingshausen – violin
- Anna Minella – violin
- Elia Mariani – violin
- Gian Guerra – violin
- Gian Lodigiani – violin
- Gianmaria Bellisario – violin
- Marco Corsini – violin
- Michelle Torresetti – violin
- Tommaso Belli – violin
- Valerio D'Ercole – violin
- Maria Lucchi – viola
- Serena Palozzi – viola
- Valentina Emilio Eria – viola
- Andrea Scacchi – cello
- Eliana Gintoli – cello
- Francesco Sacco – cello
- Martina Rudic – cello
- Linati Omar – contrabass
- Massimo Clavenna – contrabass

== Charts ==
=== Weekly charts ===
Chart (2015)	Peak position
Australian Albums (ARIA)	1
Austrian Albums (Ö3 Austria)	2
Belgian Albums (Ultratop Flanders)	2
Belgian Albums (Ultratop Wallonia)	1
Canadian Albums (Billboard)	2
Danish Albums (Hitlisten)	1
Dutch Albums (Album Top 100)	1
Finnish Albums (Suomen virallinen lista)	1
French Albums (SNEP)	1
German Albums (Offizielle Top 100)	3
Greek Albums (IFPI)	3
Hungarian Albums (MAHASZ)	3
Irish Albums (IRMA)	1
Italian Albums (FIMI)	2
Japanese Albums (Oricon)	5
Mexican Albums (AMPROFON)	1
New Zealand Albums (RMNZ)	1
Norwegian Albums (VG-lista)	1
Polish Albums (ZPAV)	6
Portuguese Albums (AFP)	1
Scottish Albums (Official Charts)	1
South Korean Albums (Circle)	4
South Korean International Albums (Circle)	2
Spanish Albums (Promusicae)	3
Swedish Albums (Sverigetopplistan)	2
Swiss Albums (Schweizer Hitparade)	1
UK Albums (Official Charts)	1
US Billboard 200	1
US Top Rock Albums (Billboard)	1

=== Year-end charts ===
Chart (2015)	Position
Australian Albums (ARIA)	45
Austrian Albums (Ö3 Austria)	43
Belgian Albums (Ultratop Flanders)	12
Belgian Albums (Ultratop Wallonia)	8
Danish Albums (Hitlisten)	99
Dutch Albums (Album Top 100)	10
French Albums (SNEP)	16
German Albums (Offizielle Top 100)	90
Hungarian Albums (IRMA)	52
Italian Albums (FIMI)	34
Japan Hot Albums (Billboard Japan)	77
Mexican Albums (AMPROFON)	41
New Zealand Albums (RMNZ)	45
Spanish Albums (PROMUSICAE)	63
Swiss Albums (Schweizer Hitparade)	5
UK Albums (OCC)	30
US Billboard 200	172
US Top Rock Albums (Billboard)	19

Chart (2016)	Position
Belgian Albums (Ultratop Flanders)	68
Belgian Albums (Ultratop Wallonia)	48
Dutch Albums (Album Top 100)	76
French Albums (SNEP)	128
US Top Rock Albums (Billboard)	50

== Certifications ==
Region	Certification	Certified units/sales
Australia (ARIA)	Gold	35,000^{^}
Austria (IFPI Austria)	Gold	7,500^{*}
Canada (Music Canada)	Platinum	80,000^{^}
Denmark (IFPI Danmark)	Gold	10,000^{‡}
France (SNEP)	2× Platinum	200,000^{*}
Italy (FIMI)	Platinum	50,000^{‡}
Mexico (AMPROFON)	Gold	30,000^{^}
Netherlands (NVPI)	Gold	20,000^{^}
New Zealand (RMNZ)	Gold	7,500^{‡}
Switzerland (IFPI Switzerland)	Platinum	20,000^{^}
United Kingdom (BPI)	Gold	100,000^{*}
Summaries
Worldwide	—	1,100,000
^{*} Sales figures based on certification alone.^{^} Shipments figures based on certification alone.^{‡} Sales+streaming figures based on certification alone.

== Release history ==
Region	Date	Format	Label
Australia	5 June 2015	CD; CD+DVD; LP; CD+DVD+LP; digital download	Warner Bros.
Austria	5 June 2015	CD; CD+DVD; LP; CD+DVD+LP; digital download	Warner Bros.
Finland	5 June 2015	CD; CD+DVD; LP; CD+DVD+LP; digital download	Warner Bros.
Germany	5 June 2015	CD; CD+DVD; LP; CD+DVD+LP; digital download	Warner Bros.
Ireland	5 June 2015	CD; CD+DVD; LP; CD+DVD+LP; digital download	Warner Bros.
Netherlands	5 June 2015	CD; CD+DVD; LP; CD+DVD+LP; digital download	Warner Bros.
New Zealand	5 June 2015	CD; CD+DVD; LP; CD+DVD+LP; digital download	Warner Bros.
Switzerland	5 June 2015	CD; CD+DVD; LP; CD+DVD+LP; digital download	Warner Bros.
United Kingdom	8 June 2015	CD; CD+DVD; LP; CD+DVD+LP; digital download	Warner Bros.
France	8 June 2015	CD; CD+DVD; LP; CD+DVD+LP; digital download	Warner Bros.
Poland	8 June 2015	CD; CD+DVD; LP; CD+DVD+LP; digital download	Warner Bros.
Canada	9 June 2015	CD; CD+DVD; LP; CD+DVD+LP; digital download	Warner Bros.
Italy	9 June 2015	CD; CD+DVD; LP; CD+DVD+LP; digital download	Warner Bros.
Spain	9 June 2015	CD; CD+DVD; LP; CD+DVD+LP; digital download	Warner Bros.
United States	9 June 2015	CD; CD+DVD; LP; CD+DVD+LP; digital download	Warner Bros.
Japan	10 June 2015	CD; CD+DVD; LP; CD+DVD+LP; digital download	Warner Bros.
Norway	10 June 2015	CD; CD+DVD; LP; CD+DVD+LP; digital download	Warner Bros.
Sweden	10 June 2015	CD; CD+DVD; LP; CD+DVD+LP; digital download	Warner Bros.
