= Psycho (Muse song) =

2015 single by Muse

Promotional single by Muse

from the album Drones
- A-side: "Dead Inside"
- Released: 12 March 2015
- Studio: The Warehouse Studio, Vancouver, British Columbia
- Genre: Hard rock; glam rock
- Length: 5:16 (album version); 5:29 (radio edit)
- Label: Warner Bros.; Helium-3
- Songwriter: Matt Bellamy
- Producers: Mutt Lange; Muse

Music video
- "Psycho" on YouTube

"Psycho" is a song by the English rock band Muse from their seventh studio album Drones, released on 12 March 2015 as a promotional single and the first from the album. It was later featured as the B-side to the official lead single later that month, "Dead Inside".

== Composition ==
Critics have described "Psycho" as a hard rock and glam rock song with elements of nu metal. The song's main riff has been "in and out of [the band's] live set" for quite some time, and the song was described by the NME as "sixteen years in the making." The famous "0305030 03055" riff, as known by its place in the live-outro to "Stockholm Syndrome", where its name comes from how it is viewed on tabbed-sheet music.

The song wanted to sample audio from the movie Full Metal Jacket, but they weren't able to get permission, so the military drill heard in the song is a reproduction.

Replying to a fan question on his Twitter account, Matt Bellamy referred to the song's explicit lyrics as "too offensive for radio". Zach Dionne of Fuse said that the song's guitars recall Marilyn Manson's "'90s goth-stompers" like "The Beautiful People".

== Release ==
On 28 February 2015, Matt Bellamy announced the track on his Twitter account, along with a link to an article about brainwashing later confirmed to be related to the album's narrative. On 8 March 2015, Muse uploaded a short clip of them mixing the track on their Instagram account. Four days later, "Psycho" was released as a preorder bonus track along with the album announcement. On the same day, a lyric video for the song was released on the band's official YouTube channel.

== Critical reception ==
In their review of the song, music magazine NME described the song as a "back-to-basics," "raw, sleaze-slathered" track featuring "sharp-toothed riffs." The magazine praised the song's directness. Referring to comments made by the band prior to the album's recording, they said that "Bellamy had talked about wanting to 'strip back' on 'Drones' as they finished 'The 2nd Law', their bombastic, dubstep-womp-addled sixth album," concluding that "by Muse's standards, 'Psycho' achieves that: for the first time in 11 years, the track sounds like three men in a room, bashing thunderously at their instruments, wringing the most eviscerating noise they can from them, as opposed to the out-of-this-world force of recent albums. Gone is the otherworldly science-fiction grandeur we've come to expect from the trio. In its place, is something a little more human, and grounded in reality. ... Muse appear to be re-emerging a tauter, more direct and fury-fuelled band than on their last few albums."

Praising Bellamy's vocal delivery, the review also detected "a malevolence ... not seen from him in forever." Referring to the song's lyrics in comparison to the band's previous albums, the review likened the track's content to the music: "the anger's more direct than ever. No space lizard allegories. No space-age philosophising or profound eco warnings ... In their place: an expletive-laden, no-bullshit desert-rock firecracker about the maddening nature of modern society." Speculating about the track's connection to Bellamy's personal life, the review suggested that "the snarl he wraps around lyrics like 'love, it will get you nowhere,' meanwhile, will no doubt have some fans wondering how his breakup with partner Kate Hudson might have impacted his psyche while making this record."

== Lyric video ==
As confirmed by the band's video director Tom Kirk on his Twitter account, the visual concept of the lyric video for the song is influenced by Brice Frillici's SEKDEK project.

In their review of the song, NME described the lyric video as "packed with drill sergeants screaming into the screen, urging you to become a militarised 'killing machine', as the band perform in darkness", "hammer[ing] home [the track's political] bluntness".

== Track listing ==
CD single
No.	Title	Length
1.	"Dead Inside"	4:23
2.	"Psycho"	5:28

== Charts ==
=== Weekly charts ===
Chart (2015)	Peak Position
Australia (ARIA)	44
Austria (Ö3 Austria Top 40)	56
Belgium (Ultratop 50 Flanders)	38
Belgium (Ultratop 50 Wallonia)	10
Finland Digital Songs (Billboard)	10
France (SNEP)	13
Ireland (IRMA)	78
Italy (FIMI)	70
Mexico Ingles Airplay (Billboard)	20
Netherlands (Single Top 100)	58
Scotland (Official Charts Company)	33
Spain (Promusicae)	25
Switzerland (Schweizer Hitparade)	13
UK Singles (Official Charts Company)	55
US Hot Rock & Alternative Songs (Billboard)	18

== Certifications ==
Region	Certification	Certified units/sales
Italy (FIMI)	Gold	25,000^{‡}
New Zealand (RMNZ)	Gold	15,000^{‡}
United Kingdom (BPI)	Gold	400,000^{‡}
^{‡} Sales+streaming figures based on certification alone.

== See also ==
- List of anti-war songs
