= Mercy (Muse song) =

Single by Muse

from the album Drones
- Released: 18 May 2015
- Recorded: 2014
- Studio: The Warehouse Studio (Vancouver, British Columbia)
- Genre: Alternative rock; electronic rock; arena rock
- Length: 3:51
- Label: Warner Bros.; Helium-3
- Songwriter: Matt Bellamy
- Producers: Mutt Lange; Muse

Muse singles chronology
"Dead Inside" (2015)	"Mercy" (2015)	"Revolt" (2015)

Music video
- "Mercy" on YouTube

"Mercy" is a song by English rock band Muse from their seventh album, Drones. It was released as the second single from the album on 18 May 2015.

== Background ==
The song is part of a concept album about "the journey of a human, from their abandonment and loss of hope, to their indoctrination by the system to be a human drone, to their eventual defection from their oppressors". On the band's website, Matt Bellamy stated that "[t]he opening line of 'Mercy' - Help me I've fallen on the inside - is a reference to the protagonist knowing and recognising that they have lost something, they have lost themselves. This is where they realize they're being overcome by the dark forces that were introduced in 'Psycho.'"

== Reception ==
Upon the album's release, the song was met with mixed reactions. Gigwise's Andrew Trendell praised the song as being "heartfelt" and "a pristine stadium gem". In his album review for Consequence of Sound, Collin Brennan, however, was less favourable, criticising that the song's "supposedly trenchant political commentary [is] negated by its almost palpable yearning to be played on commercial rock radio".

In his review of Drones, NME's Mark Beaumont described the song as "infectious electro-rock". Consequence of Sound's Collin Brennan called it an "anthem" reminiscent of "latter-day U2". In similar fashion, Gigwise's Andrew Trendell described the song as a "driving and pulsing piano-led arena power-anthem". Likening it to the music from the band's fourth album Black Holes And Revelations, he called the song a "close cousin to 'Starlight'[...], albeit with a rejuvenated energy and very forward-looking approach".

== Music video ==
The music video was directed by Sing J. Lee and shot in Los Angeles. Shots of the band performing on a large indoor stage with bright, dynamic lighting are spliced throughout between story scenes. The plot uses time as a key theme and depicts scientists performing macabre experiments on a young woman.

== Usage in media ==
"Mercy" was used in promotional spots and launch trailer for the video game Batman: Arkham Knight.

== Charts ==
=== Weekly charts ===
Weekly chart performance for "Mercy"
Chart (2015)	Peak position
Canada Rock (Billboard)	26
France (SNEP)	40
Japan Hot 100 (Billboard)	50
Japan Hot Overseas (Billboard)	16
Scottish Singles Sales (Official Charts)	69
Spain (Promusicae)	49
UK Rock & Metal (Official Charts)	1
US Hot Rock & Alternative Songs (Billboard)	38
US Rock & Alternative Airplay (Billboard)	14

=== Year-end charts ===
Year-end chart performance for "Mercy"
Chart (2015)	Position
US Hot Rock Songs (Billboard)	95
