= Dead Inside (song) =

Single by Muse

from the album Drones
- B-side: "Psycho"
- Released: 23 March 2015
- Recorded: 2014
- Studio: The Warehouse Studio (Vancouver, British Columbia)
- Genre: Electronic rock; synth-pop
- Length: 4:23 (album version); 3:50 (radio edit)
- Label: Warner Bros.; Helium-3
- Songwriter: Matt Bellamy
- Producers: Mutt Lange; Muse

Muse singles chronology
"Panic Station" (2013)	"Dead Inside" (2015)	"Mercy" (2015)

Music video
- "Dead Inside" on YouTube

"Dead Inside" is a song by English rock band Muse. The opening track on their seventh album, Drones, it was released as the album's lead single and second overall on 23 March 2015. On the same day, a lyric video for the song was released on the band's YouTube channel, while the single premiered on BBC Radio 1.

== Background ==
Placing the song within the album's context, Matt Bellamy said: "This is where the story of the album begins, where the protagonist loses hope and becomes 'Dead Inside', therefore vulnerable to the dark forces introduced in 'Psycho' and which ensue over the next few songs on the album, before eventually defecting, revolting and overcoming these dark forces later in the story".

== Composition ==
"Dead Inside" is an electronic rock and synth-pop song. Music magazine Rolling Stone described the song as a "relationship horror song" that "sets up the drama on [the band's] new album 'Drones'". According to the article, "Muse turn the tumultuous end of a relationship into a funky pop song on "Dead Inside," the latest track from their upcoming LP, Drones. Frontman Matt Bellamy sings the chorus with his bandmates as a shocking, gang-vocal stinger to bass-heavy verses like, 'I see magic in your eyes/on the outside you're ablaze and alive, but you're dead inside.'" Consequence of Sound critic Collin Brennan also described the track as synth-pop, comparing it to the works of Depeche Mode.

== Music video ==
On 3 April 2015, Muse teased pictures of the filming of the song's music video on both the band's and drummer Dominic Howard's Instagram accounts. On 5 April 2015, both the American contemporary dancer Kathryn McCormick and the So You Think You Can Dance finalist Will Wingfield were confirmed to feature in the music video for "Dead Inside". The video was released on 28 April 2015, and was directed by Robert Hales.

== Track listing ==
CD single
No.	Title	Length
1.	"Dead Inside"	4:23
2.	"Psycho"	5:28

Promotional single
No.	Title	Length
1.	"Dead Inside" (radio edit)	3:50

== Charts ==
=== Weekly charts ===
Weekly chart performance for "Dead Inside"
Chart (2015)	Peak position
Belgium (Ultratop 50 Flanders)	49
Belgium (Ultratop 50 Wallonia)	28
Canada Hot 100 (Billboard)	94
Canada Rock (Billboard)	12
Finland (Suomen virallinen lista)	26
France (SNEP)	23
Japan Hot 100 (Billboard)	92
Scottish Singles Sales (Official Charts)	43
Switzerland (Schweizer Hitparade)	44
Italy (FIMI)	53
UK Singles (Official Charts)	71
UK Rock & Metal (Official Charts)	1
US Bubbling Under Hot 100 (Billboard)	11
US Hot Rock & Alternative Songs (Billboard)	13
US Rock & Alternative Airplay (Billboard)	1

=== Year-end charts ===
Year-end chart performance for "Dead Inside"
Chart (2015)	Position
US Hot Rock Songs (Billboard)	38
US Rock Airplay (Billboard)	13

== Certifications ==
Certifications for "Dead Inside"
Region	Certification	Certified units/sales
Italy (FIMI)	Gold	25,000^{‡}
^{‡} Sales+streaming figures based on certification alone.
