= The Warehouse Studio =

Recording facility and photography studio in Vancouver, Canada

Coordinates: 49.28312°N 123.101914°W

The Warehouse Studio is a multi-media recording facility and photography studio in Vancouver, British Columbia, Canada, owned by Bryan Adams.

== Building ==
The studio is within the Oppenheimer Building, a three-story Victorian building recognized as Vancouver's oldest brick building and a landmark of Vancouver's historic Gastown neighborhood. Originally built in June 1886 by the Oppenheimer Brothers, it was the location of Vancouver's first and largest wholesale grocery business. It also served as the temporary Vancouver City Hall location from 1888 to 1891 after the city was decimated by fire. In 1902, the building was purchased by UK glass manufacturer Pilkington Brothers Limited, which utilized it as a glass factory and storage warehouse for many decades. The building later fell into terrible disrepair and became abandoned.

In 1989 the property at 100-102 Powell St. was purchased by Bryan Adams. The building at 102 Powell was gutted and converted into a parking lot with green space hidden behind a street front facade. The second building, the original Oppenheimer Warehouse on the corner was restored and converted into a 4 room recording facility. The studio complex was designed & installed by Ron Obvious. Adams worked with Don Stuart Architects to preserve the building's historical character, by preserving the original brick and beam construction. The project was completed 4 years later with the studio becoming fully operational in 1995. The Warehouse Studio received a City of Vancouver Heritage Award, in 1998. For outstanding restoration of a historic building.

== Studios ==
=== Studio 1 - SSL 4072 G+ ===
On the main floor is a large-format analog mixing room that includes an isolated recording space and a small lounge and kitchen. This studio features a 72-input Solid State Logic G Series console with Total Recall and Black E Series EQ, which was previously installed in the basement of Adams' former West Vancouver residence on Mathers Avenue. While he was on tour, Adams would allow other bands to record and mix there until his plan to create a studio complex in the heart of Vancouver could be realized.

=== Studio 2 - Neve A6630 ===
Located on the second floor is the main tracking room. The dimensions of the live room are 32 ft by 58 ft with a 24-ft ceiling and three isolation booths. There is also a lounge area, a long table for dining, full kitchen services, and a small fire escape patio.

The Neve A6630 installed in Studio 2 is one of the three custom-ordered mixing consoles built for Sir George Martin. Built in 1979, it was installed in AIR Studios on Oxford Street in London. It later found a home in Atlantic Studios in New York, until Bryan bought it in 1991. Ron Obvious rebuilt and extensively modded the console and it was installed into Studio 2.

The mixing console is a split design, with 58 channels, 24 busses, and a 32 channel tape monitor panel (58x24x32). The mic pres are remote, meaning the actual preamps (34427 modules) are housed in rolling carts on the tracking room floor. The mic trim pot on the console sends a control voltage to the pre. The main 52 channels have 31106 EQ modules. Console Modifications include:

- Six custom "Sleve" strips: an SSL G-Series Mic pPre and 242-Black EQ circuitry, housed in a Neve channel strip.
- SSL quad buss compressor
- Pre-eq insert points. The only Neve in the world with this.
- Mute & Solo Lights, like on an SSL.

=== Studio 3 - Avid S6 ===
Studio 3 was originally a mixing studio that featured a Solid State Logic 9080J series console. In October 2013 the large analog SSL was shut down and sold off to make way for renovations and a change in the function of the studio. 12 months later the 3rd floor studio reopened with a new floor plan that now includes an isolated recording and more spacious control room. Most of the processing equipment stayed but the centre piece is now a 24 fader Avid S6 controller with 32 hardware inserts.

=== Studio 4 ===
The smallest studio on the main floor is configured for lower-budget projects. It is equipped with hardware and software that includes Neve 1081 microphone preamplifiers and a Pro Tools HD digital audio workstation.

== Technical ==
Acoustic and technical considerations for The Warehouse Studio during design, construction and operation were handled by Ron "Obvious" Vermeulen with Adams providing guidance on the character and aesthetic details. When Ron "O" retired in 2003 his long-time mentor John Vrtacic took over as Technical Director for 6 years until he died in August 2009. Vrtacic's apprentice David Backus is now the technical director.

== Credits ==
- AC/DC - Stiff Upper Lip, Black Ice, Rock or Bust, Power Up
- Airbourne - No Guts. No Glory.
- Bryan Adams - 18 til I Die, Room Service, On a Day Like Today, 11
- Jann Arden
- Band of Rascals
- Biffy Clyro - Puzzle
- Billy Joel - Storm Front
- Billy Talent - Billy Talent II
- Black Veil Brides - Black Veil Brides
- Bodyslam - Dharmajāti
- Jim Byrnes
- Carmanah
- Chevelle - Wonder What's Next
- The Cribs - Men's Needs, Women's Needs, Whatever
- Current Swell
- Danielle Marie - "Vancouver"
- Daniel Ingram - At the Gala
- Destroyer
- Alan Doyle
- Elvis Costello
- Good Charlotte - Good Morning Revival, Cardiology
- Hedley - Famous Last Words
- illScarlett - All Day With It
- Colin James
- K-os - Joyful Rebellion, Atlantis: Hymns for Disco
- Linkin Park - One More Light
- Matthew Good - Hospital Music
- Metallica - Cunning Stunts
- Michelle Creber - These Boots Are Made For Walkin' (cover)
- Michael Bublé - Call Me Irresponsible, Crazy Love, Christmas, To Be Loved, Nobody but Me, Love
- The Mounties
- Dan Mangan
- Marianas Trench - Fix Me, Masterpiece Theatre
- Mother Mother - No Culture, Inside
- Mudvayne - L.D. 50
- Muse - Drones
- Nickelback - Silver Side Up, The Long Road, All The Right Reasons
- The Offspring - Days Go By
- One Bad Son
- OneRepublic - Waking Up, Native
- R.E.M. - Reveal, Around the Sun
- Reset - No Limits
- Rise Against - Siren Song of the Counter Culture
- Rodney Graham
- Shakira - Fijación Oral Vol. 1, Oral Fixation Vol. 2
- Simple Plan - Still Not Getting Any...
- Slayer - God Hates Us All
- Stars - In Our Bedroom after the War
- The Tragically Hip - World Container
- Three Days Grace - Life Starts Now
- Trapt - Trapt
- Veruca Salt - Eight Arms to Hold You

Producers and Engineers

- Bob Clearmountain
- Brian Howes
- Brendan O'Brien
- David Bottrill
- Dave "Rave" Ogilvie
- Jaquire King
- GGGarth
- Mike Fraser
- Robert John "Mutt" Lange
- Eric Ratz
- Bob Rock
- Randy Staub
- Sheldon Zaharko
