= Muse discography =

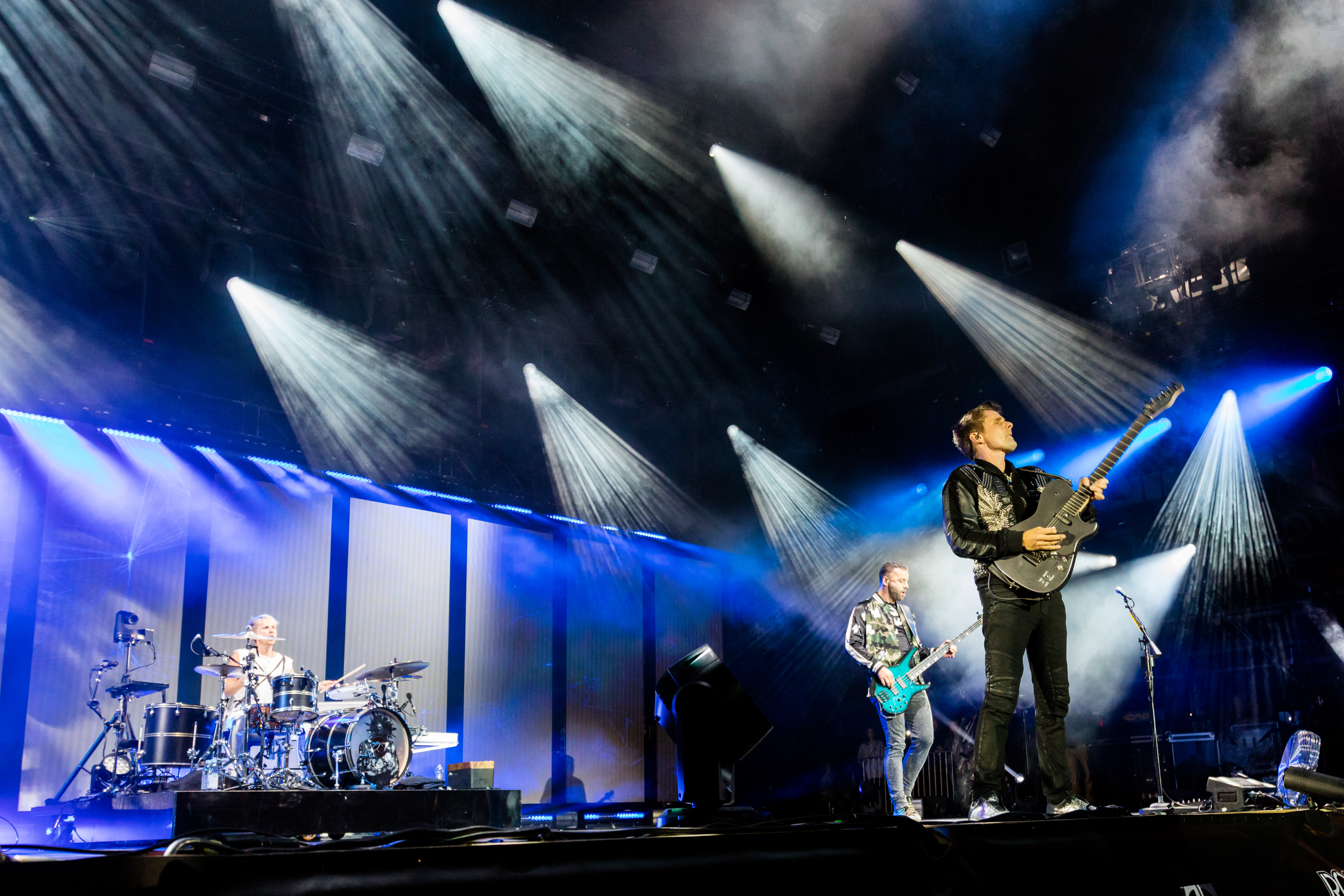
- Muse performing live in 2018
- Studio albums: 10
- Extended plays: 5
- Live albums: 2
- Compilation albums: 1
- Singles: 44
- Video albums: 3
- Music videos: 61
- Box sets: 2
- Other appearances: 4

The discography of the English rock band Muse includes ten studio albums, two live albums, one compilation album, one box set, five EPs, 44 singles, two video albums and 61 music videos.

Formed in Teignmouth, Devon, in 1994, Muse signed with Taste Media and released their debut album, Showbiz, in 1999. It was a success across Europe, and in the UK reached number 29 on the UK Albums Chart, and was certified platinum by the British Phonographic Industry (BPI). Five singles were released from Showbiz, with the final, "Unintended", becoming Muse's first to reach the top 20 on the UK Singles Chart. Muse released their second album, Origin of Symmetry, in 2001, which reached number 3 on the UK Albums Chart and was certified double platinum by the BPI. The first three singles, "Plug In Baby", "New Born" and "Bliss", all reached the UK top 25.

In 2002, Muse released their first live video album, Hullabaloo: Live at Le Zenith, Paris, and the compilation album Hullabaloo Soundtrack. The video reached number 2 on the UK Music Video Chart, while the soundtrack album reached number 10 on the UK Albums Chart. Their third studio album, Absolution, released on East West Records in 2003, was the first Muse album to top the UK Albums Chart. It reached number 103 on the US Billboard 200, but has been certified platinum by the Recording Industry Association of America (RIAA). "Time Is Running Out" was the first Muse single to enter the UK Singles Chart top ten, reaching number 8. The live video Absolution Tour reached number 9 on the UK Music Video Chart.

After founding their own label, Helium-3, and signing with Warner Bros. Records, Muse released their fourth studio album, Black Holes and Revelations in 2006. It topped several albums charts and reached the top ten on the Billboard 200. The lead single, "Supermassive Black Hole", is Muse's most successful on the UK Singles Chart to date, reaching number 4. Muse's first live album, HAARP, was released in 2008 and reached number 2 on the UK Albums Chart. The Resistance followed in 2009, topping several countries' album charts for the first time, as well as reaching number 3 in the US. The first single from the album, "Uprising", was the band's first to reach the top 40 on the Billboard Hot 100, as well as their fourth to reach the top ten in the UK. The 2nd Law and Drones released in 2012 and 2015 respectively, both topped the UK Albums Chart, and Drones was Muse's first release to reach number one on the Billboard 200. Simulation Theory, Will of the People and The Wow! Signal were released in 2018, 2022 and 2026 respectively, with the latter marking Muse's eighth consecutive album to debut at number one on the UK charts, which is a joint record for a band/group in the UK, alongside ABBA and Led Zeppelin.

== Albums ==
=== Studio albums ===
List of studio albums, with selected chart positions and certifications
Title	Album details	Peak chart positions										Sales	Certifications
Title	Album details	UK	AUS	FIN	FRA	IRL	ITA	NLD	NOR	SWI	US	Sales	Certifications
Showbiz	Released: 7 September 1999; Label: Taste; Formats: CD, LP, CS, MD	29	28	45	59	46	87	53	38	—	—		BPI: Platinum; ARIA: Gold; NVPI: Gold
Origin of Symmetry	Released: 18 June 2001; Label: Taste; Formats: CD, LP, CS, MD	3	22	30	2	3	5	19	11	6	161		BPI: 2× Platinum; ARIA: Platinum; FIMI: Gold; IFPI SWI: Gold; NVPI: Gold
Absolution	Released: 22 September 2003; Label: Taste; Formats: CD, CD+DVD, LP, CS	1	21	12	1	3	4	2	5	3	107	UK: 948,000	BPI: 3× Platinum; ARIA: Platinum; FIMI: Platinum; IFPI SWI: Gold; NVPI: Gold; RIAA: Platinum
Black Holes and Revelations	Released: 3 July 2006; Label: Warner Bros., Helium-3; Formats: CD, CD+DVD, DL	1	1	3	2	1	2	2	6	1	9	UK: 1,200,000; FIN: 15,176	BPI: 4× Platinum; ARIA: Platinum; FIMI: Platinum; IFPI FIN: Gold; IFPI NOR: Gold; IFPI SWI: Platinum; IRMA: Platinum; RIAA: Platinum; SNEP: 3× Platinum
The Resistance	Released: 14 September 2009; Label: Warner Bros., Helium-3; Formats: CD, CD+DVD, LP, DL	1	1	3	1	1	1	1	1	1	3	UK: 790,602; FIN: 23,536; FRA: 845,000	BPI: 2× Platinum; ARIA: Platinum; FIMI: 2× Platinum; IFPI FIN: Platinum; IFPI NOR: Gold; IFPI SWI: Platinum; IRMA: Platinum; NVPI: Gold; RIAA: Platinum; SNEP: Diamond
The 2nd Law	Released: 28 September 2012; Label: Warner Bros., Helium-3; Formats: CD, CD+DVD, LP, DL	1	2	1	1	2	1	1	1	1	2	FIN: 16,427	BPI: Platinum; FIMI: 2× Platinum; IFPI FIN: Gold; IFPI SWI: Platinum; IRMA: Gold; NVPI: Gold; RIAA: Gold; SNEP: 3× Platinum
Drones	Released: 5 June 2015; Label: Warner Bros., Helium-3; Formats: CD, CD+DVD, LP, DL	1	1	1	1	1	2	1	1	1	1		BPI: Gold; ARIA: Gold; FIMI: Platinum; IFPI SWI: Platinum; NVPI: Gold; SNEP: 2× Platinum
Simulation Theory	Released: 9 November 2018; Label: Warner Bros., Helium-3; Formats: CD, LP, CS, DL	1	7	3	3	5	2	1	17	1	12		BPI: Gold; FIMI: Gold; SNEP: Platinum
Will of the People	Released: 26 August 2022; Label: Warner, Helium-3; Formats: CD, LP, CS, DL	1	1	2	1	2	1	2	16	1	15	FRA: 100,000	BPI: Gold; SNEP: Platinum
The Wow! Signal	Released: 26 June 2026; Label: Warner, Helium-3; Formats: CD, LP, CS, DL	1	2	2	1	8	3	1	21	1	41		
"—" denotes a release that did not chart or was not issued in that region.

=== Live albums ===
List of live albums, with selected chart positions and certifications
Title	Album details	Peak chart positions										Certifications
Title	Album details	UK	FRA	IRL	ITA	NLD	NOR	POR	SCO	SWI	US	Certifications
HAARP	Released: 17 March 2008; Label: Warner Bros., Helium-3; Formats: CD+DVD, DL	2	3	5	5	4	2	10	2	6	46	BPI: Gold; IFPI NOR: Gold; RIAA: Gold; SNEP: Platinum
Live at Rome Olympic Stadium	Released: 2 December 2013; Label: Warner Bros., Helium-3; Formats: CD+BD, CD+DVD, DL	36	7	81	8	7	26	7	38	14	115	AFP: Gold; FIMI: Gold; SNEP: Platinum

=== Compilation albums ===
List of compilation albums, with selected chart positions and certifications
Title	Album details	Peak chart positions										Certifications
Title	Album details	UK	AUS	AUT	FRA	GER	IRL	ITA	NLD	NOR	SWI	Certifications
Hullabaloo Soundtrack	Released: 1 July 2002; Label: Taste; Format: 2CD	10	38	27	9	47	11	29	23	26	12	BPI: Gold

=== Box sets ===
List of box sets, with selected chart positions
Title	Album details	Peak chart positions						
Title	Album details	UK	GER	IRL	ITA	NLD	SWI	US
Origin of Muse	Release date: 6 December 2019; Label: Helium-3, Warner; Format: 9×CD+4×LP	70	48	85	100	58	34	— (Note: "Origin of Muse" did not register on the Billboard 200, but did reach number 97 on the Current Album Sales chart.)
Absolution XX	Release date: 17 November 2023; Label: Warner; Format: 2×CD+3×LP	—	—	—	—	—	—	—

== Extended plays ==
List of extended plays
Title	EP details	Peak chart positions		
Title	EP details	UK	NLD	SCO
Muse	Released: 11 May 1998; Label: Dangerous; Format: CD	— (Note: Muse did not enter the UK Albums Chart, but peaked at number eight on the UK Singles Sales Chart.)	—	—
Muscle Museum	Released: 11 January 1999; Label: Dangerous; Format: CD	84	92	13
Random 1–8	Released: 4 October 2000; Label: Avex Trax; Format: CD	—	—	—
Summer Stadiums 2010	Released: 15 November 2012; Label: Helium-3; Format: DL	—	—	—
Live at Köln Gloria Theatre	Released: 24 September 2015; Label: Helium-3; Format: DL	—	—	—
"—" denotes a release that did not chart or was not issued in that region.

== Singles ==
=== 1990s and 2000s ===
List of singles, with selected chart positions and certifications, showing year released and album name
Title	Year	Peak chart positions										Sales	Certifications	Album
Title	Year	UK	AUS	BEL (FL)	BEL (WA)	FRA	IRL	ITA	NLD	SWI	US	Sales	Certifications	Album
"Uno"	1999	73	—	—	—	—	—	—	—	—	—			Showbiz
"Cave"	1999	52	—	—	—	—	—	—	—	—	—			Showbiz
"Muscle Museum"	1999	25	—	— (Note: "Muscle Museum" did not register on the Ultratop 50 Singles chart, but did reach number 13 on the Ultratip chart.)	—	—	—	—	100	—	—			Showbiz
"Sunburn"	2000	22	—	—	—	—	—	—	—	—	—			Showbiz
"Unintended"	2000	20	—	— (Note: "Unintended" did not register on the Ultratop 50 Singles chart, but did reach number 32 on the Back Catalogue Singles chart.)	—	—	—	—	99	—	—			Showbiz
"Plug In Baby"	2001	11	57	—	—	40	44	29	63	88	—		BPI: Platinum	Origin of Symmetry
"New Born"	2001	12	—	— (Note: "New Born" did not register on the Ultratop 50 Singles chart, but did reach number 30 on the Back Catalogue Singles chart.)	—	65	35	39	—	—	—		BPI: Silver	Origin of Symmetry
"Bliss"	2001	22	—	—	—	87	—	—	40	—	—			Origin of Symmetry
"Hyper Music / Feeling Good"	2001	24	—	— (Note: "Feeling Good" did not register on the Ultratop 50 Singles chart, but did reach number 4 on the Back Catalogue Singles chart.)	—	—	—	—	—	—	—	UK: 377,000	BPI: Gold	Origin of Symmetry
"Dead Star / In Your World"	2002	13	—	—	—	76	32	—	69	—	—			Hullabaloo Soundtrack
"Stockholm Syndrome"	2003	—	—	—	—	—	—	—	—	—	—			Absolution
"Time Is Running Out"	2003	8	—	— (Note: "Time Is Running Out" did not register on the Ultratop 50 Singles chart, but did reach number 7 on the Back Catalogue Singles chart.)	— (Note: "Time Is Running Out" did not register on the Ultratop 50 Singles chart, but did reach number 13 on the Ultratip chart.)	58	26	14	27	38	—	UK: 292,000	BPI: Platinum; FIMI: Platinum; RIAA: Gold	Absolution
"Hysteria"	2003	17	61	— (Note: "Hysteria" did not register on the Ultratop 50 Singles chart, but did reach number 16 on the Back Catalogue Singles chart.)	—	77	—	31	92	—	— (Note: "Hysteria" did not register on the Billboard Hot 100, but did reach number 18 on the Bubbling Under Hot 100 Singles chart.)		BPI: Platinum; FIMI: Gold	Absolution
"Sing for Absolution"	2004	16	—	—	— (Note: "Sing for Absolution" did not register on the Ultratop 50 Singles chart, but did reach number 17 on the Ultratip chart.)	47	36	45	12	—	—			Absolution
"Apocalypse Please"	2004	— (Note: "Apocalypse Please" was not eligible to register on the UK Singles Chart, but did enter the UK Singles Downloads Chart at number 10.)	—	—	—	—	—	—	—	—	—			Absolution
"Butterflies and Hurricanes"	2004	14	—	—	—	70	38	—	29	—	—			Absolution
"Supermassive Black Hole"	2006	4	34	— (Note: "Supermassive Black Hole" did not register on the Ultratop 50 Singles chart, but did reach number 13 on the Ultratip chart.)	— (Note: "Supermassive Black Hole" did not register on the Ultratop 50 Singles chart, but did reach number 13 on the Ultratip chart.)	51	16	9	39	33	—	UK: 380,000	BPI: 2× Platinum; FIMI: Platinum; RIAA: Platinum	Black Holes and Revelations
"Starlight"	2006	13	46	— (Note: "Starlight" did not register on the Ultratop 50 Singles chart, but did reach number 2 on the Ultratip chart.)	— (Note: "Starlight" did not register on the Ultratop 50 Singles chart, but did reach number 6 on the Ultratip chart.)	26	23	13	52	30	— (Note: "Starlight" did not register on the Billboard Hot 100, but did reach number 1 on the Bubbling Under Hot 100 Singles chart.)	UK: 400,000	BPI: Platinum; FIMI: Platinum; IFPI SWI: Gold; RIAA: Platinum	Black Holes and Revelations
"Knights of Cydonia"	2006	10	— (Note: "Knights of Cydonia" did not enter the Australian ARIA Singles Chart but peaked at number 43 on the ARIA Digital Track Chart.)	— (Note: "Knights of Cydonia" did not register on the Ultratop 50 Singles chart, but did reach number 2 on the Ultratip chart.)	— (Note: "Knights of Cydonia" did not register on the Ultratop 50 Singles chart, but did reach number 2 on the Ultratip chart.)	—	—	—	91	—	—		BPI: Platinum; RIAA: Gold	Black Holes and Revelations
"Invincible"	2007	21	—	— (Note: "Invincible" did not register on the Ultratop 50 Singles chart, but did reach number 23 on the Ultratip chart.)	—	89	—	—	—	—	—			Black Holes and Revelations
"Map of the Problematique"	2007	18	—	— (Note: "Map of the Problematique" did not register on the Ultratop 50 Singles chart, but did reach number 5 on the Ultratip chart.)	— (Note: "Map of the Problematique" did not register on the Ultratop 50 Singles chart, but did reach number 15 on the Ultratip chart.)	—	—	—	—	—	—			Black Holes and Revelations
"Uprising"	2009	9	23	12	6	74	11	14	22	8	37	UK: 526,000	BPI: Platinum; ARIA: Gold; BRMA: Gold; FIMI: Platinum; IFPI SWI: Platinum; RIAA: Platinum; SNEP: Gold	The Resistance
"Undisclosed Desires"	2009	49	11	35	18	197	—	17	70	21	—		BPI: Silver; ARIA: Platinum; FIMI: Gold	The Resistance
"—" denotes a release that did not chart or was not issued in that region.

=== 2010s ===
List of singles, with selected chart positions and certifications, showing year released and album name
Title	Year	Peak chart positions										Certifications	Album
Title	Year	UK	AUS	BEL (FL)	BEL (WA)	FRA	IRL	ITA	NLD	SWI	US	Certifications	Album
"Resistance"	2010	38	72	— (Note: "Resistance" did not register on the Ultratop 50 Singles chart, but did reach number 10 on the Ultratip chart.)	— (Note: "Resistance" did not register on the Ultratop 50 Singles chart, but did reach number 5 on the Ultratip chart.)	—	—	41	— (Note: "Resistance" did not enter the Netherlands' Single Top 100 but peaked on the Netherlands' Single Tip Chart at number 6.)	— (Note: "Resistance" did not enter the Swiss Singles chart, but charted at number 39 on the Swiss Airplay chart.)	— (Note: "Resistance" did not register on the Billboard Hot 100, but did reach number 14 on the Bubbling Under Hot 100 Singles chart.)	BPI: Silver	The Resistance
"Exogenesis: Symphony"	2010	— (Note: "Exogenesis" did not enter the UK Singles Chart, but peaked at number 14 on the UK Physical Singles Chart Top 100.)	—	—	—	—	—	16	—	—	—		The Resistance
"Neutron Star Collision (Love Is Forever)"	2010	11	37	24	3	—	35	10	25	36	77	FIMI: Gold	The Twilight Saga: Eclipse
"Survival"	2012	22	72	13	13	18	68	24	31	40	—		The 2nd Law
"Madness"	2012	25	82	41	10	14	96	9	33	27	45	BPI: Silver; FIMI: Platinum; IFPI SWI: Gold; RIAA: 2× Platinum	The 2nd Law
"Follow Me"	2012	— (Note: "Follow Me" did not enter the UK Singles Chart, but peaked at number 60 on the UK Streaming Chart.)	—	31	37	56	—	41	—	— (Note: "Follow Me" did not enter the Swiss Singles chart, but charted at number 40 on the Swiss Airplay chart.)	—		The 2nd Law
"Supremacy"	2013	58	—	—	—	84	—	—	—	58	—		The 2nd Law
"Panic Station"	2013	— (Note: "Panic Station" did not enter the UK Singles Chart, but peaked at number 68 on the UK Streaming Chart.)	—	— (Note: "Panic Station" did not register on the Ultratop 50 Singles chart, but did reach number 19 on the Ultratip chart.)	— (Note: "Panic Station" did not register on the Ultratop 50 Singles chart, but did reach number 30 on the Ultratip chart.)	107	—	—	—	— (Note: "Panic Station" did not enter the Swiss Singles chart, but charted at number 30 on the Swiss Airplay chart.)	— (Note: "Panic Station" did not enter the Billboard Hot 100, but peaked at number 98 on the US Airplay Top 100 chart.)		The 2nd Law
"Psycho"	2015	55	44	38	10	13	78	70	58	13	—	BPI: Gold; FIMI: Gold	Drones
"Dead Inside"	2015	71	—	49	28	23	—	53	— (Note: "Dead Inside" did not enter the Netherlands' Single Top 100 but peaked on the Netherlands' Single Tip Chart at number 7.)	44	— (Note: "Dead Inside" did not register on the Billboard Hot 100, but did reach number 11 on the Bubbling Under Hot 100 Singles chart.)	FIMI: Gold	Drones
"Mercy"	2015	126	—	— (Note: "Mercy" did not register on the Ultratop 50 Singles chart, but did reach number 3 on the Ultratip chart.)	— (Note: "Mercy" did not register on the Ultratop 50 Singles chart, but did reach number 11 on the Ultratip chart.)	40	—	—	— (Note: "Mercy" did not enter the Netherlands' Single Top 100 but peaked on the Netherlands' Single Tip Chart at number 2.)	— (Note: "Mercy" did not enter the Swiss Singles chart, but charted at number 62 on the Swiss Airplay chart.)	—		Drones
"Revolt"	2015	—	—	— (Note: "Revolt" did not register on the Ultratop 50 Singles chart, but did reach number 20 on the Ultratip chart.)	— (Note: "Revolt" did not register on the Ultratop 50 Singles chart, but did reach number 19 on the Ultratip chart.)	—	—	—	— (Note: "Revolt" did not enter the Netherlands' Single Top 100 but peaked on the Netherlands' Single Tip Chart at number 23.)	—	—		Drones
"Aftermath"	2016	—	—	— (Note: "Aftermath" did not register on the Ultratop 50 Singles chart, but did register on the Ultratip Bubbling Under Singles chart.)	— (Note: "Aftermath" did not register on the Ultratop 50 Singles chart, but did register on the Ultratip Bubbling Under Singles chart.)	—	—	—	— (Note: "Aftermath" did not enter the Netherlands' Single Top 100 but peaked on the Netherlands' Single Tip Chart at number 28.)	—	—		Drones
"Reapers"	2016	127	—	— (Note: "Reapers" did not register on the Ultratop 50 Singles chart, but did reach number 43 on the Ultratip chart.)	—	75	—	—	— (Note: "Reapers" did not enter the Netherlands' Single Top 100 but peaked on the Netherlands' Single Tip Chart at number 5.)	71	—		Drones
"Dig Down"	2017	— (Note: "Dig Down" did not enter the UK Singles Chart, but peaked at number 51 on the UK Singles Downloads Chart.)	—	— (Note: "Dig Down" did not register on the Ultratop 50 Singles chart, but did reach number 13 on the Ultratip chart.)	— (Note: "Dig Down" did not register on the Ultratop 50 Singles chart, but did reach number 13 on the Ultratip chart.)	35	—	—	— (Note: "Dig Down" did not enter the Netherlands' Single Top 100 but peaked on the Netherlands' Single Tip Chart at number 17.)	47	—		Simulation Theory
"Thought Contagion"	2018	76	—	— (Note: "Thought Contagion" did not register on the Ultratop 50 Singles chart, but did reach number 2 on the Ultratip chart.)	— (Note: "Thought Contagion" did not register on the Ultratop 50 Singles chart, but did reach number 5 on the Ultratip chart.)	197	—	—	— (Note: "Thought Contagion" did not enter the Netherlands' Single Top 100 but peaked on the Netherlands' Single Tip Chart at number 22.)	24	—		Simulation Theory
"Something Human"	2018	— (Note: "Something Human" did not enter the UK Singles Chart, but peaked at number 61 on the UK Singles Downloads Chart.)	—	— (Note: "Something Human" did not register on the Ultratop 50 Singles chart, but did reach number 4 on the Ultratip chart.)	48	17	—	—	— (Note: "Something Human" did not enter the Netherlands Single Top 100 but peaked on the Netherlands' Single Tip Chart at number 26.)	77	—		Simulation Theory
"The Dark Side"	2018	— (Note: "The Dark Side" did not enter the UK Singles Chart, but peaked at number 64 on the UK Singles Downloads Chart.)	—	— (Note: "The Dark Side" did not register on the Ultratop 50 Singles chart, but did reach number 22 on the Ultratip chart.)	— (Note: "The Dark Side" did not register on the Ultratop 50 Singles chart, but did reach number 20 on the Ultratip chart.)	115	—	—	— (Note: "The Dark Side" did not enter the Netherlands Single Top 100 but peaked on the Netherlands' Single Tip Chart at number 14.)	74	—		Simulation Theory
"Pressure"	2018	96	—	— (Note: "Pressure" did not register on the Ultratop 50 Singles chart, but did reach number 3 on the Ultratip chart.)	— (Note: "Pressure" did not register on the Ultratop 50 Singles chart, but did reach number 19 on the Ultratip chart.)	165	—	—	— (Note: "Pressure" did not enter the Netherlands Single Top 100 but peaked on the Netherlands' Single Tip Chart at number 15.)	—	—		Simulation Theory
"—" denotes a release that did not chart or was not issued in that region.

=== 2020s ===
List of singles, with selected chart positions and certifications, showing year released and album name
Title	Year	Peak chart positions										Album
Title	Year	UK	AUS Digi.	CAN Digi.	FRA	HUN	JPN Over.	NLD Tip	NZ Hot	SWI	US Rock	Album
"Citizen Erased" (XX Anniversary RemiXX)	2021	—	—	—	—	—	—	—	—	—	—	Origin of Symmetry (XX Anniversary RemiXX)
"Megalomania" (XX Anniversary RemiXX)	2021	—	—	—	—	—	—	—	—	—	—	Origin of Symmetry (XX Anniversary RemiXX)
"Won't Stand Down"	2022	56	27	41	118	18	—	6	30	46	27	Will of the People
"Compliance"	2022	— (Note: "Compliance" did not enter the UK Singles Chart, but peaked at number 45 on the UK Singles Sales Chart.)	—	—	—	—	—	—	—	—	— (Note: "Compliance" did not enter the Hot Rock & Alternative Songs chart, but peaked at number 38 on the Rock & Alternative Airplay chart.)	Will of the People
"Will of the People"	2022	— (Note: "Will of the People" did not enter the UK Singles Chart, but peaked at number 96 on the UK Singles Sales Chart.)	—	—	—	—	19	—	25	—	— (Note: "Will of the People" did not enter the Hot Rock & Alternative Songs chart, but peaked at number 23 on the Mainstream Rock Airplay chart.)	Will of the People
"Kill or Be Killed"	2022	— (Note: "Kill or Be Killed" did not enter the UK Singles Chart, but peaked at number 81 on the UK Singles Sales Chart.)	—	—	—	—	—	—	—	—	— (Note: "Kill or Be Killed" did not enter the Hot Rock & Alternative Songs chart, but peaked at number 37 on the Rock & Alternative Airplay chart.)	Will of the People
"You Make Me Feel Like It's Halloween"	2022	— (Note: "You Make Me Feel Like It's Halloween" did not enter the UK Singles Chart, but peaked at number 3 on the UK Singles Sales Chart.)	—	—	—	—	—	—	32	—	— (Note: "You Make Me Feel Like It's Halloween" did not enter the Hot Rock & Alternative Songs chart, but peaked at number 41 on the Rock & Alternative Airplay chart.)	Will of the People
"Ghosts (How Can I Move On)" (original or with Elisa)	2022	—	—	—	—	—	—	—	—	—	—	Will of the People
"Unravelling"	2025	85	45	—	—	—	13	—	34	—	— (Note: "Unravelling" did not enter the Hot Rock & Alternative Songs chart, but peaked at number eight on the Rock & Alternative Airplay chart.)	The Wow! Signal
"Be with You"	2026	— (Note: "Be with You" did not enter the UK Singles Chart, but peaked at number 47 on the UK Singles Sales Chart.)	—	—	—	—	8	—	—	—	48	The Wow! Signal
"Cryogen"	2026	— (Note: "Cryogen" did not enter the UK Singles Chart, but peaked at number 36 on the UK Singles Sales Chart.)	—	—	—	—	—	—	40	—	— (Note: "Cryogen" did not enter the Hot Rock & Alternative Songs chart, but peaked at number 26 on the Alternative Airplay chart.)	The Wow! Signal
"Hexagons"	2026	—	—	—	—	—	—	—	—	—	—	The Wow! Signal
"Nightshift Superstar"	2026	— (Note: "Nightshift Superstar" did not enter the UK Singles Chart, but peaked at number 71 on the UK Singles Sales Chart.)	—	—	—	—	—	—	—	—	—	The Wow! Signal
"Hush" (with Ellie Goulding)	2026	— (Note: "Hush" did not enter the UK Singles Chart, but peaked at number 22 on the UK Rock & Metal Singles Chart.)	—	—	—	—	—	—	25	—	—	The Wow! Signal
"—" denotes a release that did not chart or was not issued in that region.

== Other charted songs ==
List of songs, with selected chart positions and certifications, showing year released and album name
Title	Year	Peak chart positions										Album
Title	Year	UK	UK Rock	AUS Digi.	BEL (WA) Tip	FRA	NLD	NZ Hot	POR	SCO	SWI	Album
"Overdue"	1998	— (Note: "Compliance" did not enter the UK Singles Chart, but peaked at number eight on the UK Singles Sales Chart.)	—	—	—	—	—	—	—	—	—	Muse
"The House of the Rising Sun"	2002	—	19	—	—	—	—	—	—	—	—	NME in Association with War Child Presents 1 Love
"Take a Bow"	2006	— (Note: "Take a Bow" did not enter the UK Singles Chart, but peaked at number 160 on the UK Singles Downloads Chart.)	—	50	—	—	—	—	—	—	—	Black Holes and Revelations
"Soldier's Poem"	2006	— (Note: "Soldier's Poem" did not enter the UK Singles Chart, but peaked at number 187 on the UK Singles Downloads Chart.)	—	—	—	—	—	—	—	—	—	Black Holes and Revelations
"Assassin"	2006	— (Note: "Assassin" did not enter the UK Singles Chart, but peaked at number 158 on the UK Singles Downloads Chart.)	—	—	—	—	—	—	—	—	—	Black Holes and Revelations
"Exo-Politics"	2006	— (Note: "Take a Bow" did not enter the UK Singles Chart, but peaked at number 165 on the UK Singles Downloads Chart.)	—	—	—	—	—	—	—	—	—	Black Holes and Revelations
"City of Delusion"	2006	— (Note: "City of Delusion" did not enter the UK Singles Chart, but peaked at number 183 on the UK Singles Downloads Chart.)	—	—	—	—	—	—	—	—	—	Black Holes and Revelations
"Hoodoo"	2006	— (Note: "Hoodoo" did not enter the UK Singles Chart, but peaked at number 200 on the UK Singles Downloads Chart.)	—	—	—	—	—	—	—	—	—	Black Holes and Revelations
"Citizen Erased"	2007	122	—	—	—	—	—	—	—	—	—	Origin of Symmetry
"Feeling Good" (live)	2008	54	1	—	—	139	—	—	—	92	—	HAARP
"United States of Eurasia"	2009	200	14	—	—	—	—	—	—	—	—	The Resistance
"MK Ultra"	2009	—	27	—	—	—	—	—	—	—	—	The Resistance
"Exogenesis: Symphony Part 1 (Overture)"	2009	—	31	—	—	—	—	—	—	—	—	The Resistance
"Unnatural Selection"	2009	—	32	—	—	—	—	—	—	—	—	The Resistance
"I Belong to You (+Mon Cœur S'ouvre a ta Voix)"	2009	—	35	—	—	—	—	—	—	—	—	The Resistance
"Guiding Light"	2009	—	36	—	—	—	—	—	—	—	—	The Resistance
"Exogenesis: Symphony Part 3 (Redemption)"	2009	—	38	—	—	—	—	—	—	—	—	The Resistance
"The 2nd Law: Unsustainable"	2012	—	24	—	—	100	—	—	—	—	—	The 2nd Law
"Prelude"	2012	— (Note: "Prelude" did not enter the UK Singles Chart, but peaked at number 98 on the UK Streaming Chart.)	—	—	—	—	—	—	—	—	—	The 2nd Law
"Big Freeze"	2012	— (Note: "Big Freeze" did not enter the UK Singles Chart, but peaked at number 89 on the UK Streaming Chart.)	—	—	—	—	—	—	—	—	—	The 2nd Law
"The Handler"	2015	139	—	—	—	64	— (Note: "The Handler" did not enter the Netherlands' Single Top 100 but peaked on the Netherlands' Single Tip Chart at number 9.)	—	—	—	—	Drones
"[JFK]"	2015	—	18	—	—	—	—	—	—	—	—	Drones
"Drones"	2015	—	24	—	—	—	—	—	—	—	—	Drones
"Defector"	2015	—	—	—	—	85	— (Note: "Defector" did not enter the Netherlands' Single Top 100 but peaked on the Netherlands' Single Tip Chart at number 18.)	—	—	—	—	Drones
"Algorithm"	2018	97	—	—	—	137	—	40	93	—	52	Simulation Theory
"Propaganda"	2018	—	—	—	—	198	—	—	90	—	—	Simulation Theory
"Get Up and Fight"	2018	—	—	—	45	—	—	—	—	—	—	Simulation Theory
"Blockades"	2018	—	—	—	— (Note: "Blockades" did not register on the Ultratop 50 Singles chart, but charted as an "extra tip" on the Ultratip chart.)	—	—	—	—	—	—	Simulation Theory
"We Are Fucking Fucked"	2022	—	23	—	—	—	—	—	—	—	—	Will of the People
"The Dark Forest"	2026	—	—	—	—	—	—	30	—	—	—	The Wow! Signal
"—" denotes a release that did not chart or was not issued in that region.

== Videos ==
=== Video albums ===
List of video albums, with selected chart positions and certifications
Title	Album details	Peak chart positions					Certifications
Title	Album details	UK	AUS	BEL (Wal.)	ITA	NLD	Certifications
Hullabaloo: Live at Le Zenith, Paris	Released: 1 July 2002; Label: Mushroom/Taste; Formats: 2DVD, VHS	2	2	—	—	8	ARIA: Platinum; BPI: Gold
Absolution Tour	Released: 12 December 2005; Label: Warner Bros.; Formats: DVD	9	4	9	5	10	ARIA: Gold; BPI: Platinum
Muse: Drones World Tour	Released: 12 July 2018; Label: Warner Bros.; Formats: Digital Download	—	—	—	—	—	
"—" denotes a release that did not chart or was not issued in that region.

=== Music videos ===
List of music videos, showing director(s) and year released
Title	Year	Director(s)	Ref.
"Uno" (version 1)	1999	unknown	
"Muscle Museum"	1999	Joseph Kahn	
"Uno" (version 2)	1999	Wolf Gresenz, Bernard Wedig	
"Uno" (version 3)	1999	unknown	
"Sunburn"	2000	Nick Gordon	
"Unintended"	2000	Howard Greenhalgh	
"Muscle Museum" (US version)	2000	unknown	
"Plug In Baby"	2001	Howard Greenhalgh	
"New Born"	2001	David Slade	
"Bliss"	2001	David Slade	
"Hyper Music"	2001	David Slade	
"Feeling Good"	2001	David Slade	
"Dead Star"	2002	Tim Qualtrough	
"In Your World"	2002	Matt Askem	
"Time Is Running Out"	2003	John Hillcoat	
"Hysteria"	2004	Matt Kirby	
"Time Is Running Out" (US version)	2004	Tom Kirk	
"Stockholm Syndrome"	2004	Tim Qualtrough	
"Sing for Absolution"	2004	Stephen Tappin	
"Butterflies & Hurricanes"	2004	Tim Qualtrough	
"Hysteria" (US version)	2004	Jens Gehlhaar, Rob Feng	
"Stockholm Syndrome" (US version)	2005	Patrick Daughters	
"Supermassive Black Hole" (version 1)	2006	Floria Sigismondi	
"Supermassive Black Hole" (version 2)	2006	Tom Kirk	
"Knights of Cydonia"	2006	Joseph Kahn	
"Starlight"	2006	Paul Minor	
"Invincible"	2007	Jonnie Ross	
"Uprising"	2009	Hydra	
"Undisclosed Desires"	2009	Jonas & Francois	
"Resistance"	2010	Wayne Isham	
"Neutron Star Collision (Love Is Forever)"	2010	Anthony Mandler	
"MK Ultra"	2010	Derek Henderson	
"Survival"	2012	IOC Media	
"The 2nd Law: Unsustainable"	2012	Tom Kirk	
"Madness"	2012	Anthony Mandler	
"The 2nd Law: Isolated System"	2012	Tom Kirk	
"Exogenesis: Symphony Part 3 (Redemption)"	2012	Tekken	
"Follow Me" (version 1)	2012	Tom Kirk	
"Follow Me" (version 2)	2012	Tekken	
"Supremacy"	2013	Terry Hall	
"Animals"	2013	Inês Freitas, Miguel Mendes	
"Panic Station"	2013	Tim Qualtrough	
"Psycho"	2015	Tom Kirk, Simon Bennett	
"Dead Inside"	2015	Robert Hales	
"Reapers"	2015	Tom Kirk	
"The Handler"	2015	Tom Kirk, Simon Bennett, Tom Jantol	
"[JFK] + Defector"	2015	Tom Kirk, Mike Isted	
"Mercy"	2015	Sing J. Lee	
"Revolt"	2015	Guy Shelmerdine	
"Aftermath"	2016	Tekken	
"New Kind of Kick"	2016	Tom Kirk	
"Dig Down"	2017	Lance Drake	
"Thought Contagion"	2018	Lance Drake	
"Something Human"	2018	Lance Drake	
"The Dark Side"	2018	Lance Drake	
"Pressure"	2018	Lance Drake	
"Algorithm"	2018	Lance Drake, Tom Teller	
"Break It to Me"	2018	Lance Drake	
"Blockades"	2018	Lance Drake	
"Won't Stand Down"	2022	Jared Hogan	
"Compliance"	2022	Jeremi Durand	
"Will of the People"	2022	Tom Teller	
"Kill or Be Killed"	2022	Ben Lowe	
"You Make Me Feel Like It's Halloween"	2022	Tom Teller	
"Liberation"	2022	Ben Lowe and Jack Lowe	
"Euphoria"	2022	Ben Lowe and Jack Lowe	
"We Are Fucking Fucked"	2022	Ben Lowe and Jack Lowe	
"Unravelling"	2025	Circus Head	
"Be with You"	2026	Nico Poalillo	
"Cryogen"	2026	Elliot Gonzo	
"Nightshift Superstar"	2026	Lado Kvataniya	

== Other appearances ==
List of other appearances, showing year released and album name
Title	Year	Album	Ref.
"Balloonatic"	1997	Helping You Back to Work Volume 1	
"House of the Rising Sun"	2002	NME in Association with War Child Presents 1 Love	
"Man of Mystery"	2007	The Supermassive Selection	
"Lies" (live)	2015	BBC Radio 1's Live Lounge 2015	
"1685" (Zedd featuring Muse)	2024	Telos	

== See also ==
- List of songs recorded by Muse
