= Hullabaloo: Live at Le Zenith, Paris =

Video by Muse
- Released: 1 July 2002
- Recorded: 28–29 October 2001
- Venues: Le Zénith, Paris
- Genres: Alternative rock; space rock; new prog; progressive metal
- Length: 79:38
- Label: Mushroom
- Directors: Matt Askem; Thomas Kirk
- Producers: Mark Hurry; Thomas Kirk

Muse chronology
Hullabaloo: Live at Le Zenith, Paris (2002)	Absolution Tour (2005)

Hullabaloo: Live at Le Zenith, Paris (also referred to as simply Hullabaloo) is the first live video album by English rock band Muse. The video documents the band's two performances at Le Zénith in Paris, France, on 28 and 29 October 2001 and features an additional disc of backstage footage. A soundtrack album for the video was also produced, entitled Hullabaloo Soundtrack.

== Track listing ==
All songs were written and composed by Matt Bellamy, except where noted.

1. "Introduction" (Sample of "What's He Building In There ?" by Tom Waits, 28 October)
2. "Dead Star" (28 October)
3. "Micro Cuts" (29 October)
4. "Citizen Erased" (28 October)
5. "Sunburn" (Guitar version, 28 October)
6. "Showbiz" (28 October)
7. "Megalomania" (29 October)
  - "Darkshines" (Japanese DVD only, 28 October)
8. "Uno" (29 October)
9. "Screenager" (29 October)
10. "Feeling Good" (Leslie Bricusse, Anthony Newley, 29 October)
11. "Space Dementia" (29 October)
12. "In Your World" (28 October)
13. "Muscle Museum" (28 October)
14. "Cave" (29 October)
15. "New Born" (29 October)
16. "Hyper Music" (28 October)
17. "Agitated" (28 October)
18. "Unintended" (29 October)
19. "Plug In Baby" (29 October)
20. "Bliss" (28 October)

== Personnel ==
- Matt Bellamy – lead vocals, guitar, piano
- Chris Wolstenholme – bass, backing vocals, guitar and bass pedals on "Unintended"
- Dominic Howard – drums, percussion

== Sales and certifications ==
Region	Certification	Certified units/sales
Australia (ARIA)	Platinum	15,000^{^}
United Kingdom (BPI)	Gold	25,000^{*}
^{*} Sales figures based on certification alone.^{^} Shipments figures based on certification alone.
