= Origin of Muse =

Box set by Muse
- Released: 6 December 2019
- Recorded: November 1996 – October 2001; 28 August 2011 (disc nine)
- Venues: Reading Festival (Reading, England) (disc nine)
- Genres: Alternative rock; progressive rock; art rock; hard rock; space rock
- Length: 465:56 (CDs); 109:37 (LPs)
- Labels: Helium 3; Warner
- Producers: David Bottrill; John Leckie; Muse; Paul Reeve

Muse chronology
Simulation Theory (2018)	Origin of Muse (2019)	Will of the People (2022)

Origin of Muse is a box set by English rock band Muse, released on 6 December 2019 through Muse's Helium 3 label and Warner Records. It includes remastered editions of Muse's first two albums, Showbiz (1999) and Origin of Symmetry (2001), as well as B-sides, demos, and live performances from their early career. In total, the box set includes 113 tracks, nine CDs, and four vinyl records.

== Contents ==
The box set is a 48-page book housed inside of a slipcase. The book contains a total of nine CDs and four heavyweight, colored vinyl records. The band's debut studio album, Showbiz (1999), as well as their second release, Origin of Symmetry (2001), were remastered for the release. The two albums each have two vinyl records as well as corresponding CD copies in the box.

The rest of the box contains the demo albums Newton Abbot Demos, The Muse EPs + Showbiz Demos, and Origin of Symmetry Instrumental Demos. The B-sides released during the respective eras of Showbiz and Origin of Symmetry each have their own CDs. A compilation of Showbiz-era tracks performed live are included on a CD, while a performance of the entire Origin of Symmetry album during the 2011 Reading Festival is on another.

Outside of music, the book features an in-depth interview with the band regarding their beginnings and the recording sessions for their first two albums. It also includes concert setlists, photos, and posters from those eras. The collection contains a total of 113 tracks, with 40 previously unreleased.

== Track listings (CD) ==
Newton Abbot Demos
No.	Title	Length
0.	"[hidden track]" (pre-gap track)	6:26
1.	"Cave"	4:53
2.	"Rain"	4:32
3.	"Agitated"	3:15
4.	"Crazy Days"	4:33
5.	"Coma"	3:33
6.	"Connect the Kettle Lead"	2:25
7.	"Balloonatic"	3:01
8.	"Boredom"	4:43
9.	"Sober"	4:11
10.	"Jimmy Kane"	3:11
11.	"Ashamed"	4:41
12.	"Plug In Baby"	2:46
13.	"Earthquake"	3:37
14.	"Good News"	3:43
15.	"Overdue"	3:27
Total length:		62:57

The Muse EPs + Showbiz Demos
No.	Title	Length
1.	"Overdue"	4:11
2.	"Cave"	4:44
3.	"Coma"	3:36
4.	"Escape"	3:19
5.	"Muscle Museum"	4:18
6.	"Sober"	4:02
7.	"Uno"	3:40
8.	"Unintended"	3:57
9.	"Pink Ego Box"	3:30
10.	"Muscle Museum #2"	1:22
11.	"Showbiz" (Live, Sawmills Studios, 1998)	4:19
12.	"Do We Need This?" (Live, Fortress Studios, 1999)	4:24
13.	"Sunburn" (Live, Fortress Studios, 1999)	3:50
14.	"Overdue" (Live, Fortress Studios, 1999)	2:34
15.	"Uno" (Alternate version, RAK Studios, 1999)	3:33
Total length:		55:19

Showbiz (Remastered)
No.	Title	Length
1.	"Sunburn"	3:54
2.	"Muscle Museum"	4:23
3.	"Fillip"	4:01
4.	"Falling Down"	4:33
5.	"Cave"	4:46
6.	"Showbiz"	5:18
7.	"Unintended"	3:57
8.	"Uno"	3:39
9.	"Sober"	4:04
10.	"Spiral Static" (bonus track)	4:46
11.	"Escape"	3:32
12.	"Overdue"	2:26
13.	"Hate This & I'll Love You"	5:14
Total length:		54:33

Showbiz B-Sides
No.	Title	Length
1.	"Recess" (Unreleased alternate version, Trident Studios, 1999)	4:11
2.	"Jimmy Kane"	3:27
3.	"Forced In"	5:09
4.	"Agitated"	2:23
5.	"Twin"	3:15
6.	"Host"	4:12
7.	"Do We Need This?"	4:17
8.	"Con-Science"	4:52
9.	"Minimum"	2:45
10.	"Ashamed"	3:52
11.	"Yes Please"	3:08
12.	"Recess"	3:39
13.	"Nishe"	2:45
Total length:		47:55

Showbiz Live
No.	Title	Length
1.	"Uno" (The Pyramid Centre, Portsmouth, 1999)	3:48
2.	"Cave" (The Pyramid Centre, Portsmouth, 1999)	4:46
3.	"Muscle Museum" (The Pyramid Centre, Portsmouth, 1999)	4:08
4.	"Falling Down" (The Pyramid Centre, Portsmouth, 1999)	4:49
5.	"Fillip" (The Pyramid Centre, Portsmouth, 1999)	4:10
6.	"Do We Need This?" (The Pyramid Centre, Portsmouth, 1999)	5:19
7.	"Agitated" (The Astoria, London, 2000)	2:57
8.	"Sunburn" (The Astoria, London, 2000)	4:04
9.	"Plug In Baby" (The Astoria, London, 2000)	4:17
10.	"Showbiz" (The Astoria, London, 2000)	6:43
11.	"Cave" (Acoustic demo, Airfield Studios, 1999)	4:18
12.	"Muscle Museum" (Acoustic demo, Airfield Studios, 1999)	4:37
Total length:		53:56

Origin of Symmetry Instrumental Demos
No.	Title	Length
1.	"Micro Cuts"	3:58
2.	"Feeling Good"	3:15
3.	"Space Dementia"	5:07
4.	"Hyper Music"	3:08
5.	"Citizen Erased"	7:14
6.	"Megalomania"	4:32
7.	"Screenager"	4:02
8.	"Shrinking Universe"	3:31
9.	"Shine"	4:08
Total length:		38:55

Origin of Symmetry (Remastered)
No.	Title	Length
1.	"New Born"	6:03
2.	"Bliss"	4:13
3.	"Space Dementia"	6:21
4.	"Hyper Music"	3:22
5.	"Plug In Baby"	3:39
6.	"Citizen Erased"	7:18
7.	"Micro Cuts"	3:38
8.	"Screenager"	4:20
9.	"Darkshines"	4:47
10.	"Feeling Good"	3:18
11.	"Futurism" (bonus track)	3:28
12.	"Megalomania"	4:37
Total length:		55:04

Origin of Symmetry B-Sides
No.	Title	Length
1.	"Nature_1"	3:42
2.	"Execution Commentary"	2:29
3.	"Bedroom Acoustics"	2:38
4.	"Shrinking Universe"	3:09
5.	"Piano Thing"	2:54
6.	"Map of Your Head"	4:26
7.	"The Gallery"	3:32
8.	"Hyper Chondriac Music"	5:30
9.	"Shine"	3:20
10.	"Please Please Please Let Me Get What I Want"	2:00
11.	"Dead Star"	3:42
12.	"In Your World"	2:37
13.	"Can't Take My Eyes Off You"	3:31
Total length:		43:30

Origin of Symmetry Live at Reading Festival
No.	Title	Length
1.	"New Born"	6:25
2.	"Bliss"	5:29
3.	"Space Dementia"	6:28
4.	"Hyper Music"	3:38
5.	"Plug In Baby"	4:43
6.	"Citizen Erased"	7:18
7.	"Micro Cuts"	3:42
8.	"Screenager"	3:56
9.	"Darkshines"	4:06
10.	"Feeling Good"	3:36
11.	"Megalomania"	4:26
Total length:		53:47

== Track listings (vinyl) ==
=== Showbiz (Remastered) ===
Side A
No.	Title	Length
1.	"Sunburn"	3:54
2.	"Muscle Museum"	4:23
3.	"Fillip"	4:01

Side B
No.	Title	Length
1.	"Falling Down"	4:33
2.	"Cave"	4:46
3.	"Showbiz"	5:18

Side C
No.	Title	Length
1.	"Unintended"	3:57
2.	"Uno"	3:39
3.	"Sober"	4:04

Side D
No.	Title	Length
1.	"Spiral Static" (bonus track)	4:46
2.	"Escape"	3:32
3.	"Overdue"	2:26
4.	"Hate This and I'll Love You"	5:14

=== Origin of Symmetry (Remastered) ===
Side A
No.	Title	Length
1.	"New Born"	6:03
2.	"Bliss"	4:13
3.	"Space Dementia"	6:21

Side B
No.	Title	Length
1.	"Hyper Music"	3:22
2.	"Plug In Baby"	3:39
3.	"Citizen Erased"	7:18

Side C
No.	Title	Length
1.	"Micro Cuts"	3:38
2.	"Screenager"	4:20

Side D
No.	Title	Length
1.	"Darkshines"	4:47
2.	"Feeling Good"	3:18
3.	"Futurism" (bonus track)	3:28
4.	"Megalomania"	4:37

== Charts ==
Chart (2019)	Peak position
Belgian Albums (Ultratop Flanders)	121
Belgian Albums (Ultratop Wallonia)	68
Dutch Albums (Album Top 100)	58
German Albums (Offizielle Top 100)	48
Irish Albums (IRMA)	85
Italian Albums (FIMI)	100
Scottish Albums (Official Charts)	50
Spanish Albums (Promusicae)	55
Swiss Albums (Schweizer Hitparade)	34
UK Albums (Official Charts)	70
