= Hullabaloo Soundtrack =

2002 compilation/soundtrack album by Muse

Compilation album / Live album by Muse
- Released: 1 July 2002
- Recorded: March 1999 – October 2001 (disc one); 28 and 29 October 2001 (disc two)
- Venue: Le Zénith (Paris) (disc two)
- Studio: Various studios (disc one)
- Genre: Alternative rock
- Length: 91:11
- Label: Taste (Note: Also released through Mushroom Records in the United Kingdom, PIAS Recordings in Benelux, Motor Music in Germany, Naïve Records in France, Festival Mushroom Records in Oceania, and Cutting Edge/maximum10 in Japan.)
- Producers: Matt Bellamy; John Leckie; Paul Reeve (disc one); John Cornfield (disc two)

Muse chronology
Origin of Symmetry (2001)	Hullabaloo Soundtrack (2002)	Absolution (2003)

Professional ratings
Review scores
Source	Rating
AllMusic	3/5 stars
NME	6/10

Hullabaloo Soundtrack, also known as simply Hullabaloo, is a compilation and live album by English rock band Muse. The album is a double album with disc one containing previously released B-sides and disc two acting as the soundtrack to their live video Hullabaloo: Live at Le Zenith, Paris, which documented the band's performances at Le Zénith in Paris, France, on 28 and 29 October 2001. It was released alongside the live video on 1 July 2002 via Taste and Mushroom records.

== Track listing ==
All tracks are written by Matt Bellamy except "What's He Building?" by Tom Waits.

Disc 1 (Selection of B-sides recorded between March 1999 & October 2001)
No.	Title	Original release	Length
1.	"Forced In"	"Uno" (1999)	4:18
2.	"Shrinking Universe"	"New Born" (2001)	3:06
3.	"Recess"	"Unintended" (2000)	3:35
4.	"Yes Please"	"Sunburn" (2000)	3:05
5.	"Map of Your Head"	"New Born" (2001)	4:25
6.	"Nature_1"	"Plug In Baby" (2001)	3:39
7.	"Shine Acoustic" (previously unreleased acoustic version of "Shine")	"Hyper Music / Feeling Good" (2001) ("Shine")	5:12
8.	"Ashamed"	"Sunburn" (2000)	3:47
9.	"The Gallery"	"Bliss" (2001)	3:30
10.	"Hyper Chondriac Music"	"Bliss" (2001)	5:28

Disc 2 (Live at Le Zenith, Paris)
No.	Title	Original release	Length
0.	"What's He Building?"	Mule Variations (1999)	1:55
1.	"Dead Star"	"Dead Star / In Your World" (2002)	4:11
2.	"Micro Cuts"	Origin of Symmetry (2001)	3:30
3.	"Citizen Erased"	Origin of Symmetry (2001)	7:21
4.	"Showbiz"	Showbiz (1999)	5:04
5.	"Megalomania"	Origin of Symmetry (2001)	4:36
6.	"Darkshines"	Origin of Symmetry (2001)	4:36
7.	"Screenager"	Origin of Symmetry (2001)	4:22
8.	"Space Dementia"	Origin of Symmetry (2001)	5:32
9.	"In Your World"	"Dead Star / In Your World" (2002)	3:10
10.	"Muscle Museum"	Showbiz (1999)	4:29
11.	"Agitated"	"Uno" (1999)	4:11

Notes

- A sample of Tom Waits's "What's He Building?" can be heard in disc two's pregap (length: 1:53). On later digital editions, the sample is placed at the beginning of track no. 1
- The opening measures of Rachmaninoff's "Prelude in C-Sharp minor" are played at the beginning of disc two's track no. 7.

== Personnel ==
- Matt Bellamy – lead vocals, lead guitar, piano, synthesisers
- Chris Wolstenholme – bass guitar, rhythm guitar, backing vocals, synthesisers
- Dominic Howard – drums, percussion

== Charts and certifications ==
=== Weekly charts ===
Chart (2002)	Peak position
Australian Albums (ARIA)	38
Austrian Albums (Ö3 Austria)	27
Belgian Albums (Ultratop Flanders)	28
Belgian Albums (Ultratop Wallonia)	6
Dutch Albums (Album Top 100)	23
French Albums (SNEP)	9
German Albums (Offizielle Top 100)	4
Irish Albums (IRMA)	11
Italian Albums (FIMI)	29
Norwegian Albums (VG-lista)	25
Scottish Albums (Official Charts)	11
Swiss Albums (Schweizer Hitparade)	12
UK Albums (Official Charts)	10
UK Independent Albums (Official Charts)	2
UK Rock & Metal Albums (Official Charts)	1

=== Year-end charts ===
Chart (2002)	Position
Belgian Albums (Ultratop Wallonia)	87
French Albums (SNEP)	150

=== Certifications ===
Region	Certification	Certified units/sales
United Kingdom (BPI)	Gold	100,000^{*}
^{*} Sales figures based on certification alone.
