= Feeling Good =

1964 song from The Roar of the Greasepaint – The Smell of the Crowd

Song
- Published: 1964 by Musical Comedy Productions
- Genre: Show tune; jazz
- Songwriters: Anthony Newley; Leslie Bricusse

"Feeling Good" (also known as "Feelin' Good") is a song written by English composers Anthony Newley and Leslie Bricusse for the musical The Roar of the Greasepaint – The Smell of the Crowd. It was first performed on stage in 1964 by Cy Grant on the UK tour.

Nina Simone recorded "Feeling Good" for her 1965 album I Put a Spell on You.

== Early performances and recordings ==
Although Bricusse and Newley shared songwriting credits, the words of the song are usually attributed to Bricusse, with the music by Newley. The song was first performed in public by Guyanese-British singer and actor Cy Grant on the opening night of The Roar of the Greasepaint – The Smell of the Crowd at the Theatre Royal in Nottingham on 3 August 1964. The show, directed by Newley, toured British provincial theatres, and was then taken to the US by theatre producer David Merrick. It opened on 16 May 1965 at the Shubert Theatre in New York City, where the role of "the Negro", who sings "Feeling Good", was taken by Gilbert Price.

In the show, Price's character is asked to compete against the show's hero "Cocky"; but, as "Cocky" and his master "Sir" argue over the rules of the game, "the Negro" reaches the centre of the stage and "wins", singing the song at his moment of triumph. It was described as a "booming song of emancipation", and a Billboard review said it was "the kind of robust number that should have strong appeal". The original cast recording of the show, featuring Price's version of the song, was released by RCA Victor in early 1965, before the show reached New York.

A version by Cy Grant with pianist Bill Le Sage – much jazzier than the original stage version – appeared on their 1965 album Cy & I. Anthony Newley's own recording appeared on his 1965 album "Who Can I Turn To" and other songs from "The Roar of the Greasepaint". One of the earliest recorded versions was a jazz treatment by saxophonist John Coltrane, which appeared on his album The John Coltrane Quartet Plays.... Recorded on 18 February 1965, it also features Art Davis, Jimmy Garrison, Elvin Jones and McCoy Tyner. Versions were also released in 1965 by Nina Simone, Jean DuShon, Julie London, Chris Connor, Billy Eckstine, Andy & The Bey Sisters and Sammy Davis Jr. On the March 26, 1966 episode of the variety show Hollywood Palace, Tammy Grimes performed a show-stopping performance of the song. Ed Ames recorded a version in 1966 on his album "It's a Man's World".

Traffic has a live version titled "Feelin' Good" on side two of their 1969 album Last Exit. Recorded at the Fillmore in San Francisco on 14 March 1968, it is almost 11 minutes long.

== Chart versions ==
=== Nina Simone ===
"Feeling Good"
- Cover of the 1994 single release

Song by Nina Simone

from the album I Put a Spell on You
- Released: June 1965
- Recorded: January 1965
- Genre: Show tune; jazz; blues
- Length: 2:53
- Label: Philips
- Songwriters: Leslie Bricusse; Anthony Newley
- Producer: Hal Mooney

Nina Simone singles chronology
"My Baby Just Cares for Me" (1987)	"Feeling Good" (1994)	"Sinnerman" (2003)

Nina Simone's version, arranged and produced by Hal Mooney, was recorded in New York in January 1965 and appeared on her album I Put a Spell on You. It was not released as a single at the time. In 1994, Simone's recording was used in a British TV commercial for Volkswagen, and became popular. Released as a single, it reached No. 40 on the UK Singles Chart in July 1994.

Simone's version was remixed by Joe Claussell in 2002 for the first volume of the Verve Remixed series.

The vocal track by Nina Simone and the music of "Feeling Good" have been sampled in numerous songs. In 1997, it was sampled in "Feeling Good" by Huff & Herb. Other uses include "How I Feel" by Wax Tailor, from the 2005 album Tales of the Forgotten Melodies; "New Day" from the debut collaborative studio album Watch the Throne by American rappers Jay-Z and Kanye West in 2011; "How I Feel" by Flo Rida, from the 2013 album The Perfect 10; and, also in 2013, in the beginning of Bassnectar's Immersive Music Mixtape Side One.

The track "About You" on Mary J. Blige's 2005 album The Breakthrough features an unusual take on the song. The bulk of the recording consists of new lyrics, composed by Mary J. Blige, will.i.am and Keith Harris; however, the chorus samples several lines from "Feeling Good" as performed by Nina Simone. Simone's original vocals are distorted so much that her voice is almost unrecognisable; for this reason, Simone receives a credit as a featured artist, and Newley and Bricusse receive credit as co-writers. "About You" is produced by will.i.am. The original instrumental track to Nina Simone's "Feeling Good" was also used in the Swedish musician Avicii's song of the same name, used by Volvo.

The Bassnectar/Simone cover was used in "Chapter 6", a first-season episode of the television series Legion and in the television show Scandal.

In 2022, American Songwriter ranked "Feeling Good" number one on their list of the 10 greatest Nina Simone songs, and in 2023, The Guardian ranked the song number four on their list of the 20 greatest Nina Simone songs.

An official music video for Simone's version was released on YouTube 56 years after the release of her recording in June 2021.

Nina Simone's version appears in several films. It is featured in a scene in Walt Disney's 2021 film "Cruella". The song is used over the final scene and the closing credits of the 2024 film "A Quiet Place: Day One." It's also used in the final scene of Wim Wenders' 2023 movie "Perfect Days."

==== Certifications ====
Region	Certification	Certified units/sales
Denmark (IFPI Danmark)	Gold	45,000^{‡}
Italy (FIMI) 2009 release	Platinum	100,000^{‡}
Spain (Promusicae)	Platinum	60,000^{‡}
United Kingdom (BPI) 2004 release	Platinum	600,000^{‡}
United States (RIAA)	2× Platinum	2,000,000^{‡}
^{‡} Sales+streaming figures based on certification alone.

=== Muse ===
"Feeling Good"

Single by Muse

from the album Origin of Symmetry
- B-side: "Please, Please, Please Let Me Get What I Want"
- Released: 19 November 2001
- Recorded: 19 September – 14 November 2000
- Genre: Alternative rock
- Length: 3:18
- Label: Taste; Mushroom
- Songwriters: Leslie Bricusse; Anthony Newley
- Producers: John Leckie; Muse

Muse singles chronology
"Bliss" (2001)	"Hyper Music" / "Feeling Good" (2001)	"Dead Star" / "In Your World" (2002)

The English rock band Muse recorded a version for their 2001 album Origin of Symmetry. It was released as a single also featuring the song "Hyper Music".

In a poll by Total Guitar about best cover songs, Muse's version came fifth. In September 2010, NME readers voted it the greatest cover song of all time, over "Twist and Shout" by the Beatles and "Hurt" by Johnny Cash. A BBC poll in 2014 placed it ninth.

Muse's version reached No. 137 on the singles chart in France, and No. 24 on the singles chart in the UK.

=== Michael Bublé ===
"Feeling Good"

Single by Michael Bublé

from the album It's Time
- Released: 4 April 2005
- Studio: Chartmaker Studios (Malibu, CA)
- Genre: Traditional pop; jazz; easy listening
- Length: 3:57
- Label: 143; Reprise
- Songwriters: Anthony Newley; Leslie Bricusse
- Producers: David Foster; Humberto Gatica; Tommy LiPuma

Michael Bublé singles chronology
"Spider-Man Theme" (2004)	"Feeling Good" (2005)	"Home" (2005)

Music video
- "Feeling Good" on YouTube

"Feeling Good" was covered by Canadian singer Michael Bublé as the lead single from his album It's Time. The single was released on 4 April 2005. The song was the opening track on his live album Caught in the Act and has appeared in television advertisements, ESPN's 2005 World Series of Poker tournament, and the 2010 NBA draft broadcast. Los Angeles Dodgers superstar Shohei Ohtani uses the Bublé's version of the song as his walk-up music during home game at-bats.

==== Chart performance ====
The single peaked at No. 162 in the United Kingdom, No. 70 in Australia, No. 36 in Germany, No. 66 in Austria, and No. 14 in Poland. The song has become one of his most popular singles and appearing on the UK singles chart in May 2010, when it reached No. 69 on the UK Singles Chart after it was featured in British advertisements.

Chart (2005–2010)	Peak position
Australia (ARIA)	70
UK Singles Chart	69
Polish Singles Chart	14
Austrian Singles Chart	66
Netherlands Singles Chart	61
German Singles Chart	36

==== Sales and certifications ====
Region	Certification	Certified units/sales
Denmark (IFPI Danmark)	Gold	45,000^{‡}
Germany (BVMI)	Gold	300,000^{‡}
Italy (FIMI)	Gold	50,000^{‡}
New Zealand (RMNZ)	Platinum	30,000^{‡}
United Kingdom (BPI)	Platinum	600,000^{‡}
^{‡} Sales+streaming figures based on certification alone.

==== Music video ====
A music video was released to accompany the single and directed by Noble Jones. It features Bublé in a nuclear power plant, reminiscent of James Bond and other 1960s secret agent movies.

=== The Pussycat Dolls ===
"Feelin' Good"

Song by the Pussycat Dolls

from the album PCD
- Released: 12 September 2005
- Recorded: 2004
- Genre: Pop-soul; jazz
- Length: 4:19
- Label: A&M
- Songwriters: Anthony Newley; Leslie Bricusse
- Producers: Ron Fair; Tal Herzberg (co.)

Audio video
- "Feelin' Good" on YouTube

American girl group the Pussycat Dolls recorded "Feeling Good" for their debut studio album, PCD (2005). The song was sung entirely by the Dolls' lead singer, Nicole Scherzinger.

==== Reception ====
The Pussycat Dolls' version of "Feelin' Good" received mixed reviews from critics. Nick Butler of Sputnikmusic wrote that the song's inclusion on the album serves as "a pretty pointless vocal workout for Nicole". John Murphy from musicOMH gave a negative review, writing: "All the emotion and melodrama of the original is ripped out of the heart of the song and we're left with a pointless, faux-jazz version. They may as well have strutted over to [Nina] Simone's grave and performed a stiletto clad dance upon it." Sal Cinquemani of Slant Magazine commented that the "rendition of 'Feelin' Good' [...] is misguided at best". In contrast, Spence D. of IGN praised the song for returning to the "retro vibe with wondrous results". On the Billboard Smooth Jazz Songs chart, the song peaked at number 23, becoming The Pussycat Dolls' only song to appear on that chart.

==== Live performances ====
The song is included on their 2006 Live from London as the fourth track of the DVD. The song is performed solely by Scherzinger. The song was also included on their first headlining tour, PCD World Tour. While delivering an a cappella version of the song, Scherzinger wore a "virginal hoodie-cum-headscarf", reported Helen Pidd of The Guardian.

=== George Michael ===
"Feeling Good"

Promotional single by George Michael

from the album Symphonica
- Released: 11 August 2014
- Length: 3:15
- Label: Aegean
- Songwriters: Anthony Newley; Leslie Bricusse
- Producers: George Michael; Phil Ramone

George Michael singles chronology
"Going to a Town" (2014)	"Feeling Good" (2014)	"Fantasy" (2017)

Music video
- "Feeling Good" on YouTube

The English singer-songwriter George Michael performed "Feeling Good" during his 2011–12 Symphonica Tour and included it on the Symphonica album (2014). The music video was released on 6 May 2014, and "Feeling Good" was sent to radio on 11 August 2014. The release of "Feeling Good" coincided with the issue of Symphonica on the vinyl format. It became his final single before his death in 2016.

The studio version of "Feeling Good" was recorded by Michael in 2008 (with actress Loretta Devine featured prominently on backing vocals) and included on the US edition of his Twenty Five compilation. He also performed it during the 2008 legs of his 25 Live tour and the 2010 George Michael Live in Australia concerts.

==== Release history ====
Country	Date	Format	Label	Ref.
Various	11 August 2014	Contemporary hit radio	Aegean	
