= David Slade =

British film and television director

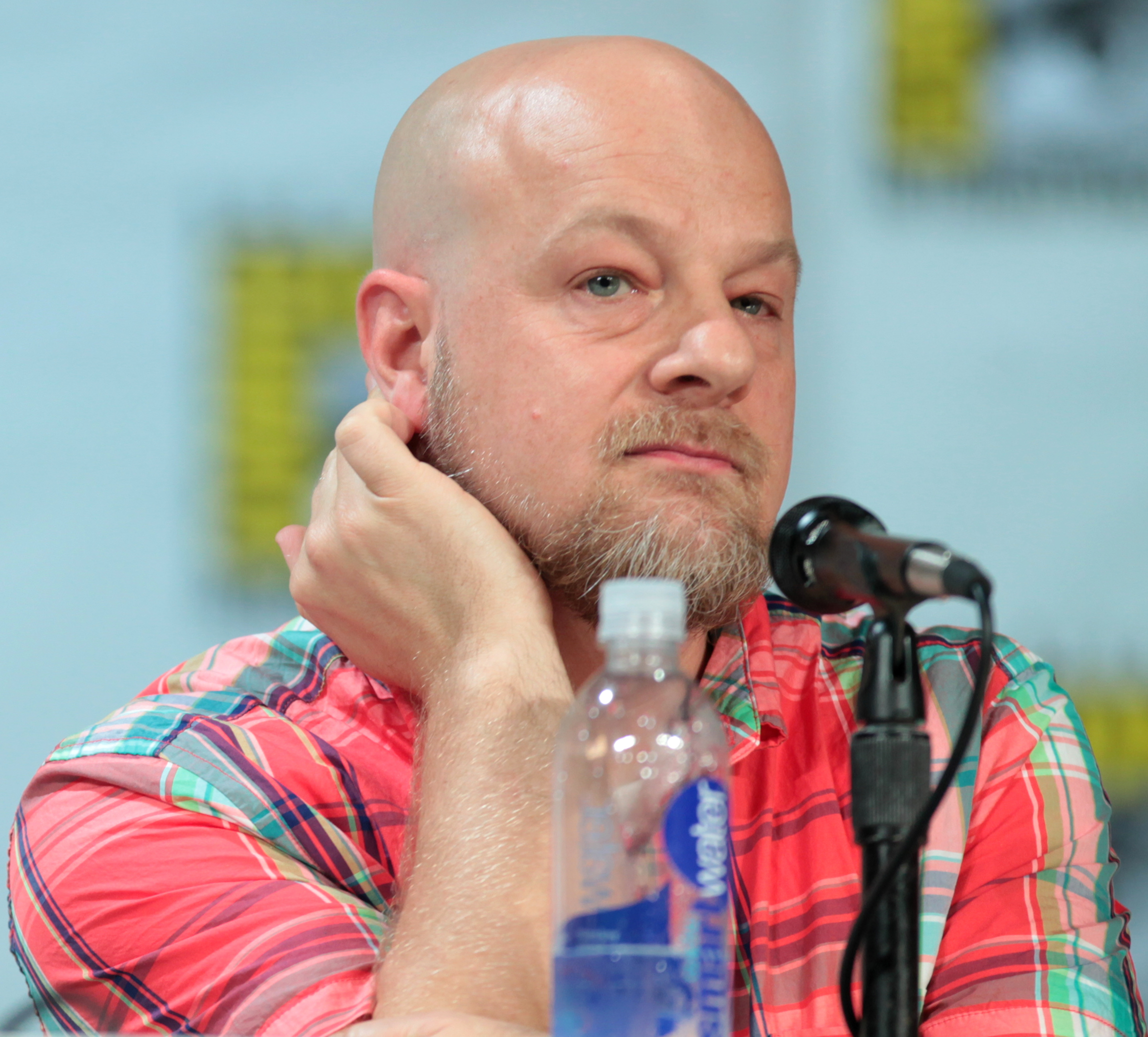
- Slade at the 2014 San Diego Comic-Con
- Born: David Aldrin Slade; 26 September 1969 (age 57); United Kingdom
- Occupations: Actor, director
- Years active: 1994–present

David Aldrin Slade (born 26 September 1969) is an English film and television director and actor. His works include the films Hard Candy, 30 Days of Night and The Twilight Saga: Eclipse. Slade is also a director for television, directing episodes for Breaking Bad, Awake, Hannibal, Crossbones, Powers, American Gods and Black Mirror. Before he was a film director, Slade was a director of commercials and music videos.

== Career ==
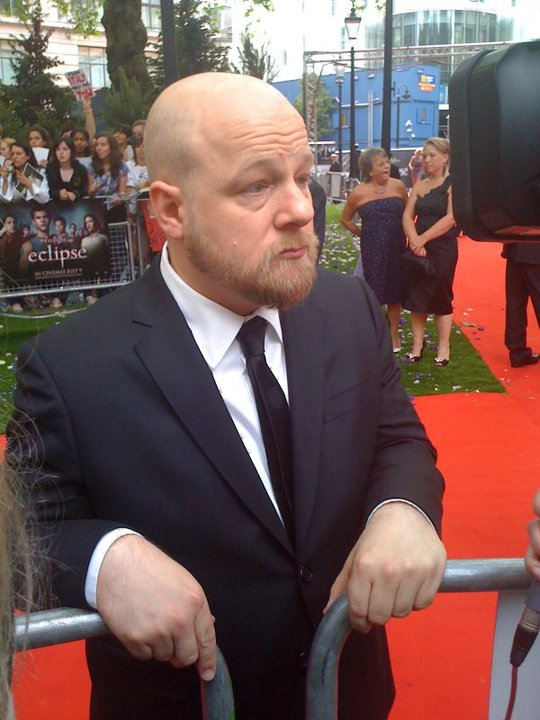
Slade at the London premiere of The Twilight Saga: Eclipse, 2010

He started his career making amateur music videos for local bands in the south of England. He had his films processed by an elderly woman who developed super 8 films for cheap in her bathtub. His first professional job was directing a commercial for the video game Silent Hill, for the English market. His first feature film, Hard Candy, was released in 2005 by Lions Gate Entertainment, who purchased the independent movie at the Sundance Film Festival. He went on to direct the vampire film 30 Days of Night in 2007. Slade directed The Twilight Saga: Eclipse, the third film in the Twilight film series.

== Personal life ==
Slade listed his favourite films as Performance, Wings of Desire, 2001: A Space Odyssey, A Clockwork Orange, and Possession. He also attributes Performance as his main inspiration for becoming a film director.

== Filmography ==
=== Feature films ===
- Hard Candy (2005)
- 30 Days of Night (2007)
- The Twilight Saga: Eclipse (2010)
- Nightmare Cinema (2018) (segment: This Way to Egress)
- Black Mirror: Bandersnatch (2018)
- Dark Harvest (2023)
- Legacy (TBA)

=== Music videos ===
- Scheer's "Wish You Were Dead"
- Beaumont Hannant's "Utuba"
- DJ Hooligan's "Rave Nation"
- Speedy J's "Symmetry" (animated video piece titled "Corpus Porpoise Posthumous Non Polhemus")
- EMF's "Bleeding You Dry"
- Aphex Twin's "Donkey Rhubarb"
- Collapsed Lung's "Eat My Goal"
- LFO's "Tied Up"
- C. J. Bolland's "Sugar Is Sweeter"
- Babybird's "If You'll Be Mine"
- DJ Rap's "Good to Be Alive" (original UK version)
- 3 Colours Red's "Beautiful Day"
- Apollo 440's "Stop the Rock"
- Stone Temple Pilots' "Sour Girl"
- OPM's "Heaven Is a Halfpipe"
- Maxim's "Carmen Queasy"
- P.O.D.'s "School of Hard Knocks"
- Stereophonics' "Mr. Writer"
- Muse's "New Born"
- Muse's "Bliss"
- Muse's "Hyper Music"
- Muse's "Feeling Good"
- Tori Amos' "Strange Little Girl"
- David Gray's "This Year's Love"
- System of a Down's "Aerials"
- The Music's "Take the Long Road and Walk It"
- Rob Dougan's "Clubbed to Death"
- Starsailor's "Poor Misguided Fool"
- AFI's "Girl's Not Grey"
- Turin Brakes' "Pain Killer"
- The Killers' "Goodnight, Travel Well" for UNICEF in conjunction with MTV EXIT

=== Short films ===
- I Smell Quality (1994)
- Do Geese See God? (2004)
- MEATDOG: What's Fer Dinner (2008)

=== Television series ===
- Breaking Bad
  - Episode 4.03 – "Open House"
- Awake
  - Episode 1.01 – "Pilot"
- Hannibal
  - Episode 1.01 – "Apéritif"
  - Episode 1.03 – "Potage"
  - Episode 1.13 – "Savoureux"
  - Episode 2.11 – "Kō No Mono"
  - Episode 2.13 – "Mizumono"
- Crossbones
  - Episode 1.01 – "The Devil's Dominion"
- Powers
  - Episode 1.01 – "Pilot"
  - Episode 1.02 – "Like a Power"
- American Gods
  - Episode 1.01 – "The Bone Orchard"
  - Episode 1.02 – "The Secret of Spoons"
  - Episode 1.03 – "Head Full of Snow"
- Black Mirror
  - Episode 4.05 – "Metalhead"
  - Black Mirror: Bandersnatch (2018)
  - Episode 7.04 – "Plaything"
- Barkskins
  - Episode 1.01 "New France"
  - Episode 1.02 "The Turtle King"
