= Hypermusic =

Hypermusic may refer to:

- "Hyper Music" (song), by the English alternative rock band Muse from the 2001 album Origin of Symmetry
- Hypermusic Prologue: A Projective Opera in Seven Planes, an opera by Lisa Randall and Hèctor Parra

== See also ==
- Hyperinstruments; see Tod Machover
