= Stockholm Syndrome (Muse song) =

2003 single by Muse

Single by Muse

from the album Absolution
- Released: 14 July 2003
- Recorded: 2003
- Studio: Grouse Lodge (Westmeath, Ireland)
- Genre: Alternative metal; hard rock; progressive metal
- Length: 4:58 (album version); 4:03 (radio edit)
- Label: East West; Taste
- Composers: Matt Bellamy; Dominic Howard; Chris Wolstenholme
- Lyricist: Matt Bellamy
- Producers: Rich Costey; Muse

Muse singles chronology
"Dead Star" / "In Your World" (2002)	"Stockholm Syndrome" (2003)	"Time Is Running Out" (2003)

"Stockholm Syndrome" is a song by the English rock band Muse from their third studio album, Absolution (2003). The song was released as the album's first single on 14 July 2003 and also appears on the Absolution live DVD. It was released alongside its artwork as a download-only single through the official Muse website. The song's promotional video was included in the "Time Is Running Out" CD single, and was shot using a thermal camera. A different video was made for the song's release in the US, depicting the band playing the song in a fictitious talk show.

In March 2005, Q placed "Stockholm Syndrome" at number 44 in its list of the 100 Greatest Guitar Tracks.

== Composition ==
The main riff is based around the Phrygian Dominant mode of the harmonic minor scale. The verses follow a chromatic chord progression. This progression was originally written for the piano, but later reworked for layered guitars and synths. Chris Wolstenholme said that the riff, resembling that of a heavy metal song, was created by Matt Bellamy, who played the riff during rehearsals and in between songs performed live. The producer, Rich Costey, vocodered the guitar with a Nord modular synthesiser, creating "hollow, white noisey" sound.

== Lyrics and meaning ==
Stockholm syndrome is a psychological response sometimes seen in an abducted hostage, in which the hostage shows signs of loyalty to the hostage-taker, regardless of the danger (or at least risk) in which the hostage has been placed. The song's lyrics take the perspective of the abuser, rather than victim's perspective.

The syndrome is named after the Norrmalmstorg robbery of Kreditbanken at Norrmalmstorg, Stockholm, Sweden, in which the bank robbers held bank employees hostage and the victims became emotionally attached to their victimisers, and even defended their captors after they were freed from their six-day ordeal.

== Music videos ==
The video shows the band members in an infrared filter, playing the song. The U.S. music video sees the band playing at a late night show. As the band plays the song, it causes the audience to run around crazily on the set, while the host, cameraman and other crew members are blown out of the set by an unknown force, with the members of Muse unaffected by the chaos happening around them. As Matt Bellamy plays the lead guitar riff towards the end of the song, it causes the set to explode in different areas. In the final chorus, the audience and crew group together and sing to the chorus of the song. As Muse play the outro of the song, the people on the set run out of the set, as a final shot reveals that the entire set is empty save for the members of Muse.

== Live performances ==
In concert, the song is often played teamed with "Plug In Baby" as the two songs have similar tempos. One example of this is during the second Wembley performance. However, during The Resistance Tour, this song has usually been paired with the first part of the band's "Exogenesis Symphony" due to the similar tuning. In most live performances of this song, it is followed by several instrumental riffs and jams (usually two or three); these can make performances of the song last up to 10 minutes on some occasions, most notably at the band's headline appearance at the 2004 Glastonbury Festival. One of the riffs commonly played as an outro to "Stockholm Syndrome" was later incorporated into the song "Psycho", a track from the band's seventh studio album, Drones, released in 2015. During The Resistance Tour, one performance of this song at the Staples Center in Los Angeles lasted 13 minutes after eight riffs followed the song. On The 2nd Law Tour the song is part of a lottery system alongside "New Born" and a random selection. On the band's Simulation Theory World Tour, the song was played in the form of a medley including New Born, Assassin, Reapers, and The Handler.

== Media ==
On 8 May 2008, the song was released as downloadable content (as part of a Muse 3-song pack) for the rhythm game Guitar Hero III: Legends of Rock. The song is also available to play on Rocksmith 2014 as part of a Muse 5-song pack.

Dream Theater's "Never Enough", which was released two years following, bears some strong similarities to the song. The band have also performed covers of "Stockholm Syndrome" in their live shows.

Progressive metalcore band, ERRA, covered the song for the deluxe edition of their 2021 self-titled album.

== Charts ==
Chart (2003–2004)	Peak position
US Alternative Airplay (Billboard)	31
