= Safta Jaffery =

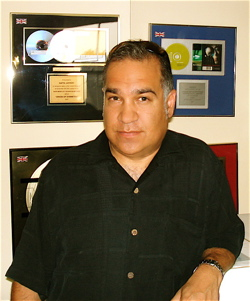
- Safta Jaffery
- Born: 6 March 1958
- Died: 25 September 2017 (aged 59)
- Occupation: Record producer
- Years active: 1976–2015
- Organization: SJP/Dodgy Productions
- Notable work: The Stone Roses; Coldplay; Muse; Radiohead
- Awards: over 150 Platinum, Gold, Silver award discs
- Website: sjpdodgy.co.uk

Safta Jaffery (6 March 1958 – 25 September 2017) was the British founder and owner of one of the first producer management companies in the United Kingdom called SJP/Dodgy Productions. The company's producers produced albums for artists such as Radiohead, The Stone Roses, Roger Waters, Rolling Stones, Razorlight, Supergrass, Coldplay and The Cure. They amassed over 150 certified platinum, gold and silver sales awards. Jaffery was also the co-owner and managing director of the music publishing company Taste Music, Ltd. and the artist management company (and former record label) Taste Media, Ltd. Taste Media managed and produced a number of high-profile artists, most notably discovering, and representing the rock band Muse.

== Early years and education ==
Safta was born in London, England the son Syed Shabbir Ali Jaffery an anesthesiologist and consultant. He spent his early childhood in Hyderabad, India, living with his grandmother and sister. Safta’s parents moved him back to London to attend secondary school at Spencer Park School in Wandsworth, London. He had three brothers. Safta was initially married to Angie living in Croydon and then married again to Nadia and lived in Wimbledon. He has two children with Nadia.

Jaffery started his career in the late 1970s and early 1980s working in the A&R departments for Dick James Music, Decca Records, MAM Records and Magnet Records. In 1985, Jaffery set up the producer management company SJP/Dodgy Productions. The original roster included John Leckie (Stone Roses, Radiohead), Mark Dodson (The Who, Anthrax), Pete Hammond (New Musik/Latin Quarter) and Chris Cameron (Hot Chocolate, George Michael). Other producer clients added in the 1990s included Michael Brauer (Coldplay/The Kooks), Ian Caple (Tricky/Tindersticks), George Shilling (Soup Dragons/Steve Winwood), David M. Allen (The Cure/The Charlatans), Chris Kimsey (Rolling Stones/INXS), Mark Plati (Prince/David Bowie), Chris Allison (Wedding Present/Shack), Tony Mansfield (B52's/Aha) and Nick Griffiths (Roger Waters/Pink Floyd).

These producers have amassed over 150 certified platinum, gold and silver sales awards.

In 1994, Jaffery was asked by the Yamaha Music Foundation, a Japanese music production company, to assist them in widening the appeal of the Japanese group Chage & Aska outside of the Pacific Rim. The group had sold 45 million albums in their region, but had not been successful yet elsewhere. Jaffrey devised the concept of the international collaboration featuring western pop stars recording the songs of Chage & Aska. After meeting with heads of major record companies in Los Angeles, Jaffrey secured fifteen major international artists to record the album, and was awarded the title "International Executive Producer" to produce it. The resulting album entitled One Voice featured the artists Lisa Stansfield, Apache Indian, Michael Hutchence (of INXS), Rick Astley, Cathy Dennis, Maxi Priest/Shaggy, Wendy Matthews, Marianne Faithfull, Alejandro Sanz, Londonbeat and Boy George. The album, which began under Jaffrey's direction and supervision, was licensed to EMI Premier in the United Kingdom for world distribution. To date, the album was sold in 500,000 copies worldwide.

== Taste Music and Taste Media ==
In 1996, Jaffrey co-founded two new companies, Taste Media, Ltd. and Taste Music, Ltd. As co-owner and managing director for both companies, Jaffery secured numerous territorial worldwide license record deals with various independent and major labels with a portfolio of artists including Muse, Vega 4, One Minute Silence, Shed Seven, Sundae Club and Serafin. Artists represented by Taste Media also achieved Brit Awards, Q Awards, NME Awards, Kerrang! Awards, Music Week Awards and MTV Music Awards. In 2005, Warner Music purchased Taste Media, although Jaffrey retained the name logo and brand and re-launched the company in 2008.

In 2010, Taste Music was sold to Warner/Chappell Music.

== Muse collaboration ==
Jaffery was introduced to Muse in 1997 through Dennis Smith, co-founder of Taste Media and owner of Sawmills Studio where Muse recorded their first EP. In 1998, he secured a six-album co-label record deal with Maverick Records in the United States, Canada and Mexico, and a three-album co-label licensing deal with the small UK division of Mushroom Records – an Australian label, for the UK, Ireland and Australia.

Taste Media signed a six-album record deal with Muse in 1998, under which Jaffery and Smith would manage the band for free, having already been contractually granted the recording and publishing rights. Together, they executively produced the band's first 3 studio albums, Showbiz, Origin of Symmetry and Absolution. In 2005, Jaffery and Smith relinquished their roles as Muse's management, although they still retained their record contract. After the three albums had been released, all of the international licensing deals expired and both Maverick and Mushroom Records were bought by Warner Music. Muse's contract was sold to Warner, with Jaffery retaining the Taste company name and logo. Jaffery bought out Smith's stake in Taste Music, and remains the publisher for Muse's first three albums.

== China and India ==
In 2007, Jaffery was voted onto the board of Association of Independent Music (AIM). He travelled to China and while he was in Shanghai, he was approached by the Chinese band The Honeys. They asked Jaffery to produce their second studio album entitled Water. He returned to Shanghai with George Shilling who co-produced, engineered, mixed and mastered the album.

Also in early 2008, through an invitation by the British Council, Jaffery and producer client John Leckie travelled to India and held auditions in New Delhi, South Mumbai and Bangalore. From thirty local emerging rock bands they have selected four bands for Leckie to produce. The bands Medusa, Indigo Children, Advaita and Swarathma each recorded two tracks at Yash Raj Studios in Mumbai with John Leckie and Dan Austin.
