= Z.Vex Effects =

- Type: Private
- Industry: Musical instruments
- Founded: 1994; 32 years ago
- Founder: Zachary Vex
- Headquarters: Minneapolis, Minnesota, United States
- Products: Effects pedals
- Website: https://www.zvex.com

Z.Vex Effects is an effects pedal company founded by Zachary Vex and based in Minneapolis, Minnesota. Z.Vex played a large role in popularizing boutique pedals.

== History ==
In 1994, Vex left his job as a recording engineer due to tinnitus and was soon evicted from his apartment. With relocation money from the Minneapolis Community Development Agency, he found a new apartment and turned to pedal-building after finding the schematic for a 1960s Shin-Ei Apollo Fuzz Wah printed on the inside of its casing. Vex built his own, but found the result uninteresting. With several circuit modifications, he had his first pedal, the Octane, an octave-up fuzz that he sold three of to a local dealer, who just wanted Vex to leave the store. The dealer subsequently encouraged Vex to keep building pedals and asked for another design, which Vex had to create overnight because his relocation money had run out. The result was the Fuzz Factory, a five-knob fuzz pedal design capable of a large array of unique sounds for a fuzz.

Vex founded Z.Vex Effects in 1995, with the Octane as the company's first offering. Unable to afford silk screen printing that other pedal-makers used, Vex turned to his then-girlfriend to paint the pedal casings by hand, which she did for the first year or so. Z.Vex's Minneapolis-made pedals continue to be hand-painted by an employee, with "beautifully-crazy" graphic design work serving as a hallmark for the brand since its beginning. The popularity of the Fuzz Factory upon its release established Vex as a pioneer in the boutique pedal industry.

== Notable users ==
- Greg Camp former guitarist and writer for Smash Mouth, currently of Defektor
- Malcolm Young of AC/DC had used the Nano Head mostly at home
- Trent Reznor of Nine Inch Nails owns a Fuzz Factory, a Machine, a Woolly Mammoth and a Nano Head
- Alan Sparhawk of Low
- Matt Bellamy of Muse, owns guitars with a built-in Fuzz Factory
- Stephen Carpenter of Deftones
- J Mascis of Dinosaur Jr.
- Billy Gibbons of ZZ Top
- Isaac Brock (musician) of Modest Mouse
- Brad Shultz of Cage The Elephant uses a Z.Vex Mastotron
- John Frusciante of Red Hot Chili Peppers owns a Z.Vex Fuzz Factory
- Eric Erlandson of Hole
- Ian D'Sa of Billy Talent uses a Woolly Mammoth on guitar
- Billy Corgan of Smashing Pumpkins owns several Z.Vex pedals
- Jack White of The White Stripes
- Dean Fertita of The Dead Weather
- Nels Cline of Wilco owns many Z.Vex pedals
- Kevin Shields of My Bloody Valentine owns numerous Z.Vex pedals
- Efrim Menuck of A Silver Mt. Zion
- Anton Newcombe of Brian Jonestown Massacre uses Super Duper and Mastoron
- Ben Gibbard of Death Cab for Cutie uses a Box of Rock and Super Duper 2 in 1
- Annie Clark of St. Vincent uses a Z.Vex Mastotron
- Michio Kurihara of Ghost
- Mike Kerr of Royal Blood uses a Z.Vex Mastotron

== Other products ==
The company also manufactures a Probe line of effects (the Fuzz Probe, Wah Probe and Tremolo Probe) that are modified versions of other pedals the company makes. What makes this series of pedals unique is the copper plate, which has an antenna underneath it that senses how close your foot (or something else) is to the pedal, giving you the ability to manipulate an aspect of the pedal's sound. From the company's website:

"The probe circuit generates a small (one or two inches high) 'bubble' of RF energy at about a million cycles per second above the copper plate. As your foot or hand (or any wet or metallic object, for that matter) approaches the copper plate, the RF field is disturbed and the circuit reacts by increasing the brightness of an LED, which drives a photoresistive cell and controls the circuit."
