= Time Is Running Out (Muse song) =

2003 single by Muse

- CD single

Single by Muse

from the album Absolution
- B-side: "The Groove"
- Released: 8 September 2003
- Studio: Grouse Lodge (Westmeath, Ireland)
- Genre: Alternative rock
- Length: 3:56
- Label: East West
- Composers: Matt Bellamy; Dominic Howard; Chris Wolstenholme
- Lyricist: Matt Bellamy
- Producers: Rich Costey; Muse

Muse singles chronology
"Stockholm Syndrome" (2003)	"Time Is Running Out" (2003)	"Hysteria" (2003)

Music video
- "Time Is Running Out" by Muse on YouTube

"Time Is Running Out" is a song by the English rock band Muse, from their third studio album, Absolution. It was released as the album's second single on 8 September 2003 in the UK and 6 April 2004 in the US.

"Time is Running Out" was Muse's first top-10 hit in the UK, reaching number eight. It was Muse's breakthrough hit on US alternative rock radio, reaching number nine on the Billboard Modern Rock Tracks chart. The song is available to play on Rocksmith 2014 as part of a Muse 5-song pack.

== Production ==
Bassist Chris Wolstenholme stated that making of "Time is Running Out" is "something we'd never really done before". The song is one of the last tracks they did on the album to record. The band recorded the song and finished it when they were in Ireland. They intended the song to be more funky and a little more groovy that made someone want to click the fingers. Wolstenholme said the song was influenced by Michael Jackson's "Billie Jean".

The band spent hours working on the bass sound for the introduction, processing Wolstenholme's bass with multiple effects pedals. Eventually, they used a Roland synthesiser playing through a Marshall amp.

== Music video ==
The video, directed by John Hillcoat, depicts a number of military officials seated at a round table performing actions simultaneously, moving to the beat of the song, as Muse play the song on the table, with the officials apparently oblivious to Muse's presence. Eventually, the officers begin to start dancing on the table, seeming to go insane. They eventually end up crawling. It is partially based on Dr. Strangelove or: How I Learned to Stop Worrying and Love the Bomb.

== Track listings ==
- UK 7", UK/Japanese/French CD
1. "Time Is Running Out" – 3:56
2. "The Groove" – 2:38
3. "Stockholm Syndrome" (video) – 4:59 (CD versions only)
- UK DVD
1. "Time Is Running Out" – 3:56
2. "Time Is Running Out" (video) – 3:58
3. "Time Is Running Out" (making of video) – 2:00

== Charts ==
=== Weekly charts ===
Weekly chart performance for "Time Is Running Out"
Chart (2003–2004)	Peak position
France (SNEP)	58
Germany (GfK)	90
Italy (FIMI)	14
Netherlands (Dutch Top 40)	38
Scottish Singles Sales (Official Charts)	8
Switzerland (Schweizer Hitparade)	38
UK Singles (Official Charts)	8
UK Rock & Metal (Official Charts)	1
US Alternative Airplay (Billboard)	9

=== Year-end charts ===
2003 year-end chart performance for "Time Is Running Out"
Chart (2003)	Position
UK Singles (OCC)	193

2004 year-end chart performance for "Time Is Running Out"
Chart (2004)	Position
US Modern Rock Tracks (Billboard)	46

== Certifications ==
Certifications for "Time Is Running Out"
Region	Certification	Certified units/sales
Italy (FIMI)	Platinum	50,000^{‡}
New Zealand (RMNZ)	Gold	15,000^{‡}
Spain (Promusicae)	Gold	30,000^{‡}
United Kingdom (BPI)	Platinum	600,000^{‡}
United States (RIAA)	Gold	500,000^{‡}
^{‡} Sales+streaming figures based on certification alone.

== Release history ==
Release dates and formats for "Time Is Running Out"
Region	Date	Label	Format	Catalogue
United Kingdom	8 September 2003	East West	7-inch vinyl	EW272 / 5050466854872
United Kingdom	8 September 2003	East West	CD	EW272CD / 5050466854926
United Kingdom	8 September 2003	East West	DVD	EW272DVD / 5050466855053
Australia		Taste Media	CD	5050466896926
France		Taste Media, Naive	CD	NV50121 / 3298490501214
Japan		Taste Media	CD	CTCM-65044 / 4945817650443
