= Citizen Erased =

Song by Muse

from the album Origin of Symmetry
- Released: 18 June 2001
- Recorded: September 2000 – February 2001
- Studio: Real World (Wiltshire); Abbey Road (London)
- Genre: Progressive rock; space rock
- Length: 7:21
- Label: Taste
- Songwriter: Matt Bellamy
- Producers: John Leckie; Muse

"Citizen Erased" is a song by English rock band Muse. It is the sixth track on their second studio album, Origin of Symmetry (2001). Written by singer and guitarist Matt Bellamy, it is a grandiose, multi-section progressive rock and space rock song that serves as the centrepiece of Origin of Symmetry. Despite having not been released as a single at first, it charted at No. 122 on the UK Singles Chart in 2007 and became a fan favourite. It was later given a new mix as part of Origin of Symmetry: XX Anniversary RemiXX in 2021 and was released as that album's lead single.

== Recording and composition ==
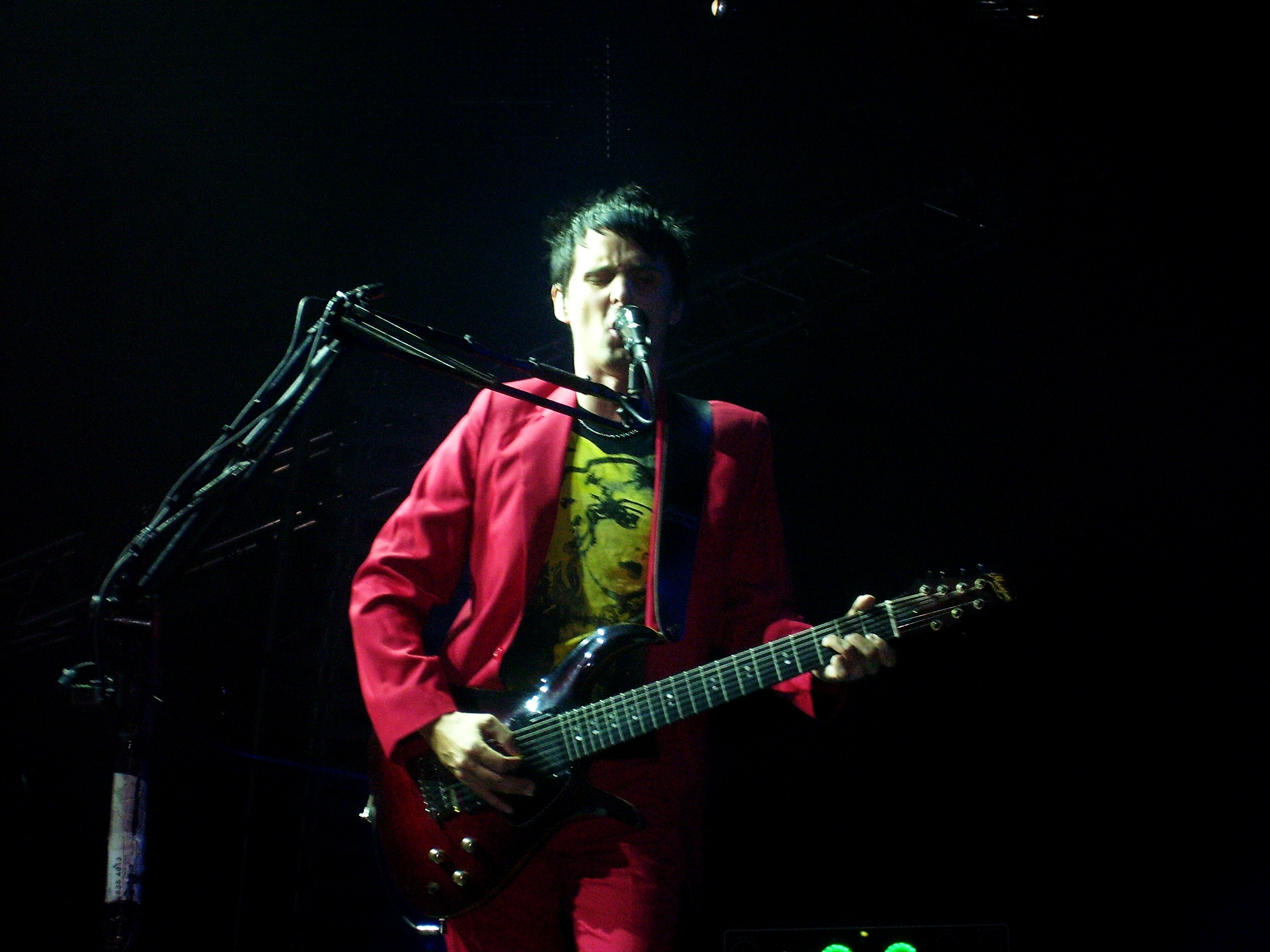
Matt Bellamy used a seven-string Manson guitar (pictured) on "Citizen Erased"

"Citizen Erased" was written by singer and guitarist Matt Bellamy, produced by John Leckie and Muse, and has a total runtime of 7 minutes and 21 seconds, making it one of the longest songs in Muse's discography. It was primarily recorded at Real World Studios in Box, Wiltshire. Musically, it has been described as progressive rock and space rock. The sixth track on Origin of Symmetry (2001), it has been regarded as the album's centrepiece. It features a multi-section arrangement that includes "twinkly, emotive arpeggios", as described by Guitar.com.

The song was built around a funk-inspired drum beat developed by Dominic Howard. Chris Wolstenholme began playing to Howard's beat on bass guitar and Bellamy soon applied a chord structure, which resulted in the backbone of "Citizen Erased" being formed. Bellamy used a seven-string Manson guitar on the track, tuned to drop A tuning in standard variation. "Citizen Erased" was the first Muse song to feature a seven-string guitar; this was also the first Manson guitar to be purchased by Bellamy, who would later own a majority stake in the company. Bellamy also used a Z.Vex Fuzz Factory pedal on the track.

Because of how long the heavier sections of the initial song lasted, the band decided to "add another song to the end of it"; this turned out to be the piano-led coda that closes out the track. A string section was recorded at Abbey Road Studios for the song's coda, but was not made audible in the song's original mix and instead was filtered out by a droning phaser effect. When Origin of Symmetry was being remixed for its 20th anniversary in 2021, the string section was made audible. Chromatic arpeggios that were quieter in the original mix were also given a cleaner tone and made louder.

Discussing the lyrics of the song, Bellamy described the song as "an expression of what it feels like to be questioned". He was influenced by the frequency of which he was asked by others for his thoughts on human purpose. He went on to say that "I don't really have the answers and I have to respond on the knowledge I have obtained so far, but the problem is that it gets printed, and something else has come along that's made you completely disagree with what you said". Al Horner of NME described the lyrics as being about "forgetting what's gone before and exploring new worlds uninhibited and 'open-minded' – the way Bellamy attests we used to before being corrupted by our leaders." He adds that the lyrics potentially reference George Orwell's 1949 dystopian novel Nineteen Eighty-Four, where individuals are similarly "erased" and deeply affected by totalitarianism.

== Legacy ==
"Citizen Erased" was not released as a single from Origin of Symmetry. Despite this, it became a fan favourite. In 2007, "Citizen Erased" entered the UK Singles Chart at No. 122, holding that position for one week before falling out of the chart. Muse created a spiritual successor to the song in the form of the ten-minute-long "The Globalist", the eleventh track on their seventh studio album, Drones (2015). When Origin of Symmetry: XX Anniversary RemiXX was announced in 2021, "Citizen Erased" was released as the lead single from the remixed album.

== Personnel ==
Personnel adapted from Origin of Symmetry liner notes.

Muse

- Matt Bellamy – vocals, guitar, piano, keyboards, string arrangements
- Dominic Howard – drums
- Chris Wolstenholme – bass guitar

Additional musicians

- Clare Finnimore – viola
- Sara Herbert – violin
- Caroline Lavelle – cello
- Jacqueline Norrie – violin

Technical personnel

- Chris Brown – additional engineering, programming
- John Cornfield – mixing
- John Leckie – production, engineering
- Claire Lewis – assistant engineering
- Ric Peet – engineering
- Ray Staff – mastering
- Mirek Styles – assistant engineer

== Chart performance ==
| Chart (2007) | Peak position |
|---|---|
| UK Singles (Official Charts Company) | 122 |
