= I Put a Spell on You (album) =

Studio album by Nina Simone
- Released: June 1965
- Recorded: 1964–1965
- Studio: New York City
- Genre: Vocal jazz; blues; pop
- Length: 34:21
- Label: Philips
- Producer: Hal Mooney

Nina Simone chronology
Broadway-Blues-Ballads (1964)	I Put a Spell on You (1965)	Pastel Blues (1965)

Singles from I Put a Spell on You
- 1. "I Put a Spell on You" Released: 1965

Professional ratings
Review scores
Source	Rating
AllMusic	3/5 stars
Pitchfork	9.1/10
Q	4/5 stars
Record Mirror	4/5 stars

I Put a Spell on You is a studio album by American singer, songwriter, arranger and pianist Nina Simone. Recorded in 1964 and 1965 in New York City, it was released by Philips Records in 1965. It peaked at number 99 on the Billboard 200 chart and number 18 on the UK Albums Chart. The title track "I Put a Spell on You" peaked at number 23 on the Hot Rhythm & Blues Singles chart and number 28 on the UK Singles Chart.

The album was re-issued in November 2020 by Verve and Universal Music Enterprises as part of their "audiophile-grade" Acoustic Sounds series.

== Critical reception ==
AllMusic reviewer Richie Unterberger gave the album 3 stars out of 5, calling it "One of her most pop-oriented albums, but also one of her best and most consistent." He added, "There are really fine tunes and interpretations, on which Simone gives an edge to the potentially fey pop songs, taking a sudden (but not uncharacteristic) break for a straight jazz instrumental with 'Blues on Purpose.'"

In 2017, NPR placed it at number 3 on the "150 Greatest Albums Made by Women" list. Writing for NPR, Audie Cornish called it "the closest you'll ever hear her come to pop." In 2024, Apple Music 100 Best Albums named it the 88th best album of all time, making it the only album by Simone to appear on the list.

== Track listing ==
No.	Title	Writer(s)	Length
1.	"I Put a Spell on You"	Jalacy Hawkins	2:34
2.	"Tomorrow Is My Turn"	Charles Aznavour, Marcel Stellman, Yves Stéphane	2:48
3.	"Ne me quitte pas"	Jacques Brel	3:34
4.	"Marriage Is for Old Folks"	Leon Carr, Earl Shuman	3:29
5.	"July Tree"	Irma Jurist, Eve Merriam	2:41
6.	"Gimme Some"	Andy Stroud	2:57
7.	"Feeling Good"	Leslie Bricusse, Anthony Newley	2:53
8.	"One September Day"	Rudy Stevenson	2:48
9.	"Blues on Purpose"	Rudy Stevenson	3:16
10.	"Beautiful Land"	Leslie Bricusse, Anthony Newley	1:54
11.	"You've Got to Learn"	Charles Aznavour, Marcel Stellman	2:41
12.	"Take Care of Business"	Andy Stroud	2:03
Total length:			34:21

== Personnel ==
Credits adapted from liner notes.

- Nina Simone – piano, vocals
- Rudy Stevenson – guitar
- Hal Mooney – arrangement, conducting
- Horace Ott – arrangement, conducting

== Charts ==
Chart (1965)	Peak position
US Billboard 200	99
UK Albums (OCC)	18
Chart (2021–2022)	Peak position
US Jazz Albums	10
