= Z.Vex Fuzz Factory =

Fuzz pedal made by Z.Vex Effects

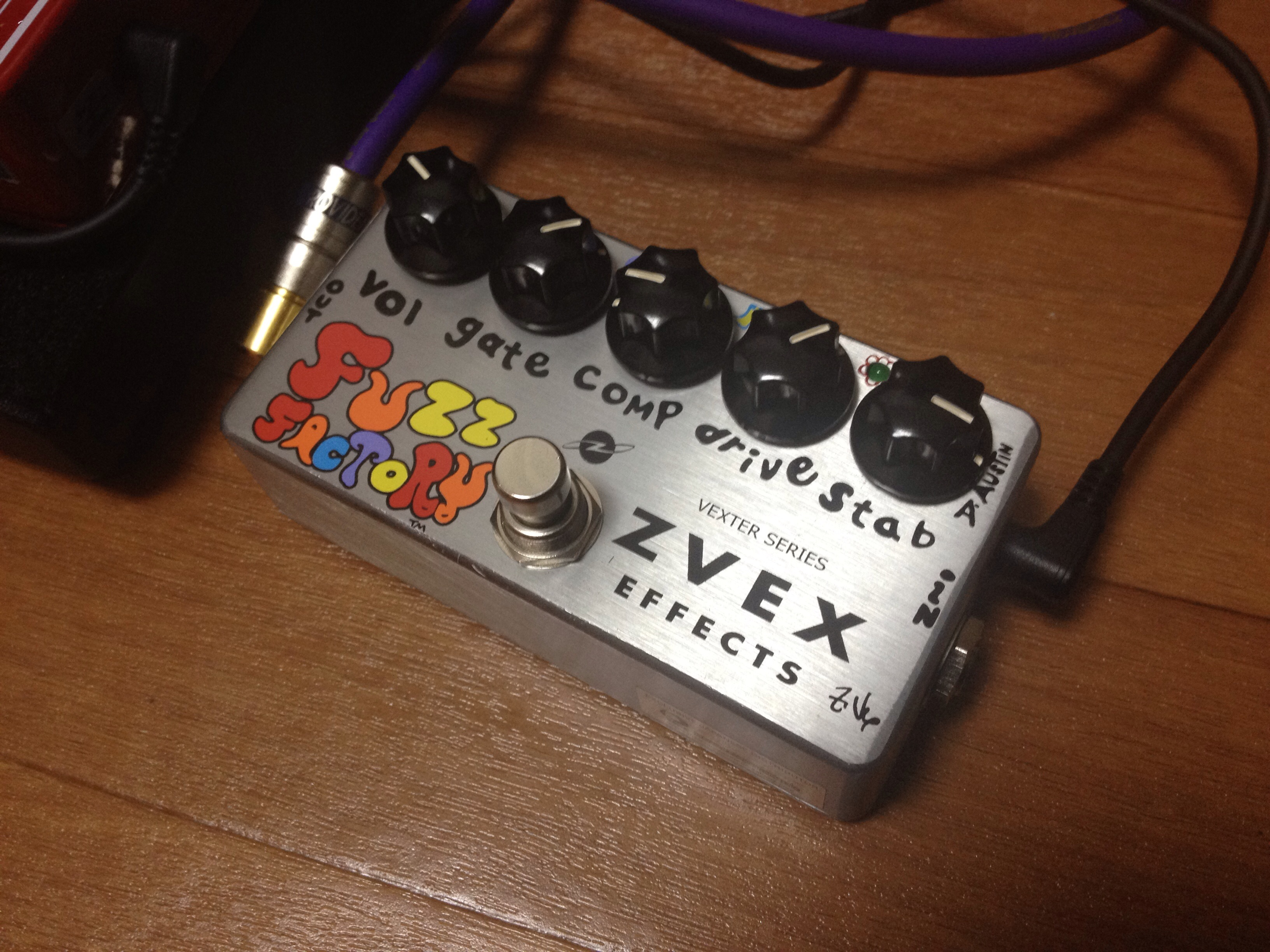
- Fuzz Factory (Vexter series)
- Brand: Z.Vex Effects
- Dates: 1995—present

Technical specifications
- Effects type: Fuzz pedal

Controls
- Pedal control: Volume, Gate, Comp, Drive, Stab

Input/output
- Inputs: Mono
- Outputs: Mono

The Fuzz Factory is a fuzz pedal manufactured by Z.Vex Effects and first released in 1995. At its core, the Fuzz Factory uses a circuit similar to a modified Fuzz Face, but includes unique controls to alter the biasing of its germanium transistors, relying on their instability when incorrectly biased to give users the ability to create a variety of unconventional sounds alongside traditional fuzz tones. Guitar World praised the Fuzz Factory for its "unique and experimental approach to fuzz" and dubbed it a "modern classic." Music Radar credited the Fuzz Factory for establishing Z.Vex as the "original weirdo boutique pedal maker."

== Format ==
A hand-painted Fuzz Factory

The Fuzz Factory uses a small, horizontal case that is hand-painted in a cartoonish style and produced in limited numbers in Minneapolis, Minnesota. Z.Vex also produces the Fuzz Factory as part of its lower-cost Vexter series, which uses the same circuit but with silk-screened graphics and assembly in Taiwan. It uses true bypass switching and draws a relatively low 3mA, compared to a Tube Screamer's 40mA.

=== Controls ===
The Fuzz Factory has five standard controls, all of which are highly interactive. The manual reads, "Although the five knobs are named for the parameters over which they seem to have the most control, please don’t hold me to it."

- Volume: a passive level control at the end of the circuit.
- Gate: acts as a noise gate; also controls the biasing of the first transistor, which acts as the second gain stage and can result in a "sputtering guitar signal and glitchy cut-outs" depending on its setting.
- Comp: controls the biasing of the third and final transistor. Used with the "Drive" control, this largely affects the character of the fuzz, with a softer style of fuzz when turned counterclockwise and a harder style turned clockwise.
- Drive: controls the gain produced by the second germanium transistor, akin to the "Fuzz" control on a Fuzz Face. The Drive control has little to no effect when Comp is maxed.
- Stab: short for "stability", this control regulates the voltage supplied to the transistors, dictating whether the pedal acts as a traditional fuzz or a "spitting, sputtering noise machine."

== History ==
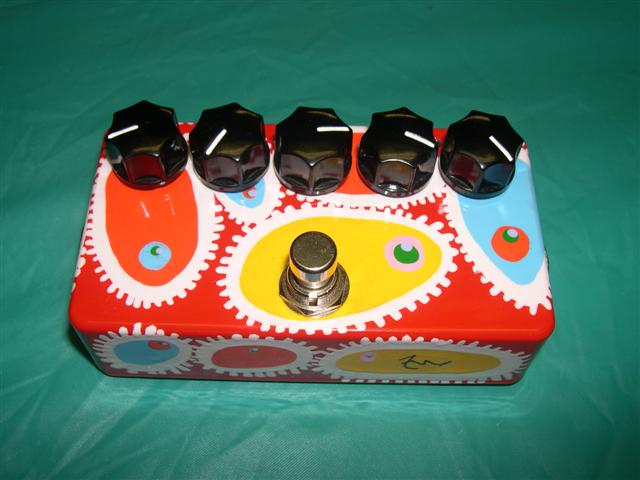
Fuzz Factory painted with an amoeba theme

Z.Vex founder Zachary Vex designed the Fuzz Factory overnight in 1994. He began with a collection of unique germanium transistors purchased from a surplus store with the intent of creating a fuzz pedal similar to a Fuzz Face. Vex was initially disappointed by the transistors' lack of distortion no matter how he used them, so he added a gain boost to the front of the circuit and the pedal "just went haywire." According to Vex, "it started squealing and making all kinds of weird noises and I couldn’t get it to settle down." Vex replaced the fixed-value resistors with pots in order to identify his preferred values and then re-fix them, but he found that adjusting the pots allowed him to create a variety of textures he loved, and the friends he showed his new creation to encouraged him to keep the pots in.

The prototype used a bypass footswitch as well as a second footswitch that flipped between positive ground and negative ground, with positive ground making the circuit less stable. Vex later changed this control to a pot, resulting in a final, five-control layout—three of which he could not easily describe the function of. The local dealer Vex took the first Fuzz Factories to objected to the control layout, feeling customers would be confused, but Vex insisted this meant buyers could find their own sounds. The Fuzz Factory became a success after Guitar Player published a positive review. In 2013, Z.Vex released its first variation of their pedal, the Fat Fuzz Factory, which adds a toggle switch that extends the circuit's range into lower registers.

Guitar World credited its enduring popularity among guitarists to the pedal acting as "both a blank canvas and a rich wall of sound" that encourages creativity. The Fuzz Factory's success established Z.Vex as a major figure in the popularization of boutique effects pedals.

== Players ==
Many notable players have utilized the Fuzz Factory for its array of potential sounds. Matt Bellamy of Muse extensively used a Fuzz Factory on the band's early records, like Origin of Symmetry, even having Fuzz Factories built into several of his guitars. Other notable users include Stephen Carpenter of Deftones, John Frusciante of the Red Hot Chili Peppers, Trent Reznor of Nine Inch Nails, and St. Vincent.
