= New Born =

2001 single by Muse

- 'CD1' cover

Single by Muse

from the album Origin of Symmetry
- B-side: "Shrinking Universe"; "Piano Thing"; "Map of Your Head"
- Released: 4 June 2001
- Studio: Ridge Farm (Rusper)
- Genre: Alternative rock; art rock; progressive rock; alternative metal
- Length: 6:03 (album version); 4:38 (radio edit)
- Label: Taste
- Songwriter: Matt Bellamy
- Producers: David Bottrill; Muse

Muse singles chronology
"Plug In Baby" (2001)	"New Born" (2001)	"Bliss" (2001)

"New Born" is a song by the English rock band Muse. It is the opening track on their second studio album, Origin of Symmetry (2001), and was released as the second single on 4 June 2001 and reached number 12 on the UK Singles Chart. The song was also featured on the Hullabaloo live DVD, alongside HAARP (2008).

== Background and content ==
"New Born" is written in the key of E minor. The song starts out at a relatively fast tempo of 147 bpm, and then increases pace during each verse. The melodic introduction features some modern minimalist style piano work. The song is also recognizable for its distinct guitar riff, which is based on a circle of fifths progression.

Regarding the meaning of the song, Matt Bellamy has said: "It's about a semi-fear of the evolution of technology, and how in reality it's destroying all humanity. My fear is that we can't control it because it's moving faster than we are, so the song's setting myself in a location in the future where the body is no longer important and everyone's plugged into a network. The opening line is 'link it to the world', so it's connecting yourself on a worldwide scale and being born into another reality."

Chris Wolstenholme also said: "I think between the three of us [New Born] is probably one of our favourite tracks off Origin of Symmetry. It is a good live track. I think it's one of the songs which showcases the experimental side of the band. It is not really a conventional pop song. I think a lot of the reason for choosing these songs is that we went for the heavier more direct kind of songs rather than going for anything too mellow."

== Recording ==
"New Born" first started out as a guitar-based piece played in soundcheck during the Showbiz tour back in 1999, and the piano intro was written afterwards. During the recording of the album in the David Bottrill sessions, the band experimented with using Bellamy's voice for the arpeggios instead of the piano, but decided that this was too "abstract" and removed it during post-recording.

== Live performances ==
The live versions of the song are often modified and feature some improvisation and embellishments. In particular, Matt Bellamy usually plays a slightly re-worked piano melody during the introduction. Much of the guitar work is also notably different, the guitar solo is usually extended and more elaborate, and features a "tapping" section before the tremolo. Live versions can also last notably longer, such as the 2007 Wembley Stadium (as seen on the HAARP DVD). "New Born" was a live staple from its debut in 2000 until the end of The Resistance Tour. After this, the song made occasional appearances during The 2nd Law, Psycho Tour, and Drones World Tour. On the band's Simulation Theory World Tour, the song was played in the form of a medley including "Stockholm Syndrome", "Assassin", "Reapers", and "The Handler".

== Track listings ==
All songs written by Matt Bellamy.

UK CD1
No.	Title	Length
1.	"New Born"	6:04
2.	"Shrinking Universe"	3:08
3.	"Piano Thing"	2:53
4.	"New Born" (video)	4:39

UK CD2
No.	Title	Length
1.	"New Born"	6:04
2.	"Map of Your Head"	4:28
3.	"Plug In Baby" (live)	3:33

UK 7-inch
No.	Title	Length
1.	"New Born"	6:04
2.	"Shrinking Universe"	3:08

Digital download
No.	Title	Length
1.	"New Born"	6:04
2.	"New Born" (Oakenfold Perfecto mix)	7:02
3.	"Shrinking Universe"	3:08
4.	"Piano Thing"	2:53
5.	"Map of Your Head"	4:28
6.	"Plug In Baby" (live)	3:33

== Personnel ==
Personnel adapted from Origin of Symmetry liner notes.

- Matt Bellamy – lead vocals, guitars, keyboards
- Chris Wolstenholme – bass, backing vocals
- Dominic Howard – drums

=== EP ===
New Born

EP by Muse
- Released: 4 June 2001
- Recorded: 1999–2001
- Genre: Alternative rock
- Label: Columbia
- Producers: David Bottrill; Paul Reeve

Muse chronology
Plug In Baby (2001)	New Born (2001)	Dead Star / In Your World (2002)

"New Born" was released as an extended play (EP) on 5 June 2001 in Greece and Cyprus by Columbia Records.

=== Track listing ===
1. "New Born"
2. "Shrinking Universe"
3. "Piano Thing"
4. "Map of Your Head"
5. "Plug In Baby" (live)
6. "New Born" (Oakenfold Perfecto remix)

== Charts ==
Chart (2001)	Peak position
Europe (Eurochart Hot 100)	44
France (SNEP)	65
Ireland (IRMA)	35
Italy (FIMI)	39
Scottish Singles Sales (Official Charts)	14
UK Singles (Official Charts)	12
UK Indie (Official Charts)	3

== Certifications ==
Region	Certification	Certified units/sales
United Kingdom (BPI)	Silver	200,000^{‡}
^{‡} Sales+streaming figures based on certification alone.
