= Origin of Symmetry =

Studio album by Muse
- Released: 18 June 2001
- Recorded: September 2000 – February 2001
- Studios: Ridge Farm (Rusper); Real World (Wiltshire); Astoria (Richmond); Abbey Road (London); Sawmills (Fowey); St. Mary's Church (Bathwick)
- Genres: Alternative rock; progressive rock; space rock; hard rock
- Length: 51:41
- Label: Taste (Note: Also released through Mushroom Records in the United Kingdom, PIAS Recordings in Benelux, Motor Music in Germany, Naïve Records in France, Festival Mushroom Records in Oceania, Cutting Edge/maximum10 in Japan, and Warner Bros. Records in the United States.)
- Producers: David Bottrill; John Leckie; Muse

Muse chronology
Random 1–8 (2000)	Origin of Symmetry (2001)	Hullabaloo Soundtrack (2002)

Muse studio album chronology
Showbiz (1999)	Origin of Symmetry (2001)	Absolution (2003)

XX Anniversary RemiXX cover

Singles from Origin of Symmetry
- 1. "Plug In Baby" Released: 28 February 2001; 2. "New Born" Released: 4 June 2001; 3. "Bliss" Released: 20 August 2001; 4. "Hyper Music" / "Feeling Good" Released: 19 November 2001

Origin of Symmetry is the second studio album by the English rock band Muse, released on 18 June 2001 through Taste Media. It was produced by John Leckie and David Bottrill.

Origin of Symmetry is considered Muse's breakthrough album. It reached number three on the UK Albums Chart and was certified platinum. It was the first Muse album to chart in the U.S. "Plug In Baby", "New Born", "Bliss", and the double A-side "Hyper Music" / "Feeling Good" were released as singles. As of 2018, Origin of Symmetry had sold more than two million copies worldwide.

Origin of Symmetry received mostly positive reviews, with critics praising its blend of rock and classical music. It has since been named one of the greatest rock albums of the 2000s by several publications. For the album's 20th anniversary in 2021, Muse released a remixed and remastered version.

== Writing ==
Origin of Symmetry was described as alternative rock, progressive rock, space rock and hard rock. Muse developed it during their tour for their debut album, Showbiz. "Feeling Good", a cover, was written for Broadway by Anthony Newley and Leslie Bricusse in 1964, and first recorded by Nina Simone for her 1965 album I Put a Spell on You.

Whereas the Showbiz lyrics had "wallowed in heartbroken angst", Matt Bellamy's lyrics moved to "sci-fi surrealism". The album title derives from the 1994 book Hyperspace by the theoretical physicist Michio Kaku, which suggests the title The Origin of Symmetry for a future book about the discovery of supersymmetry, a reference to On the Origin of Species. Bellamy said: "Everyone's been writing about the origin of life so now they'll start looking at the origin of symmetry; there's a certain amount of stability in the universe and to find out where it originates from would be to find out if God exists."

== Recording ==
After completing the Showbiz tour, Muse recorded "Plug In Baby", "Bliss", "New Born" and "Darkshines" with the producer David Bottrill, forming the "backbone" of Origin of Symmetry. To capture their live energy, Muse recorded together as a band, with some overdubs.

After Bottrill departed to work on the Tool album Lateralus, Muse enlisted John Leckie, who had produced Showbiz. They recorded in Sawmills in Fowey, Cornwall; Ridge Farm Studio in Surrey; Real World Studios in Box, Wiltshire; and David Gilmour's Astoria houseboat studio on the Thames. While they were working in Real World Studios, they went to a church in Bath to record a church organ for "Megalomania".

Having mainly recorded Showbiz with a Gibson Les Paul guitar, Bellamy recorded Origin of Symmetry using a custom Manson guitar equipped with a built-in Fuzz Factory, a fuzz distortion effect. It was the first of many collaborations between Bellamy and Manson.

== Release ==
Origin of Symmetry was released on 18 June 2001. It was originally scheduled for release in the United States through Maverick Records, which had also released Showbiz. However, Muse left Maverick when they demanded Bellamy rerecord the album with less falsetto, and it was not released in the US until 2005.

== Critical reception ==
Professional ratings
Review scores
Source	Rating
AllMusic	4.5/5 stars
Drowned in Sound	10/10
Hot Press	8/12
The Independent	3/5 stars
The List	4/5
NME	9/10
Pitchfork	8.3/10
Q	5/5 stars
Stylus Magazine	C
Sunday Herald	3/5 stars

Origin of Symmetry received mainly positive reviews. Roy Wilkinson of Q praised it as an "astonishing record... where extra-terrestrial fascinations meet the classical world's more unhinged impulses", adding that "comparisons with Radiohead that dogged Muse's early career now seem all but obsolete". Roger Morton of NME called the album a "reinvention of grunge as a neo-classical, high gothic future rock, full of flambéed pianolas and white-knuckle electric camp ... It's apparent that Muse can handle their brutal arias." Q named Origin of Symmetry one of the 50 best albums of 2001, while Kerrang! named it the ninth-best.

The Guardian's Betty Clarke panned Origin of Symmetry as "unbelievably overblown, self-important and horrible". The Stylus critic Tyler Martin felt that Muse were "very good at their craft", but that "the constant overplaying of everything waters it all down immensely".

== Legacy ==
In 2006, Q named Origin of Symmetry the 74th-greatest album. In 2008, Q readers voted it the 28th-best British album. Kerrang! named it the 20th-best British rock album and the 13th-best album of the 21st century. For its 10th anniversary, Muse performed Origin of Symmetry in its entirety at the Reading and Leeds Festivals on 26 August and 28 August 2011.

In a retrospective review, Natalie Shaw of BBC Music wrote that Origin of Symmetry "shows a band with the drive and unfettered ambition to create a standalone marvel which not only awakens the ghosts and clichés from prog's pompous past, but entirely adds its own voice". She said many elements of later Muse albums, such as Black Holes and Revelations (2006), could be traced back to the album. The author Amy Britton argued that Origin of Symmetry made Bellamy "this generation's guitar hero", highlighting "Plug In Baby" and "New Born". In a 2021 review, the Pitchfork critic Jazz Monroe wrote: "Muse were playing melodrama as teenage realism, an extremely, ridiculously honest noise ... By combining goth vulnerability with sci-fi scale and hard-rock drama, [Origin of Symmetry] captures a paradox of young romance: on one hand, Bellamy sounds wracked with despair, but he proclaims his heartbreak with the glee of an ecstatic preacher."

=== Reissues ===
On 6 December 2019, Origin of Symmetry was remastered and reissued as part of the Origin of Muse boxset, alongside Showbiz, demos, live performances and other material. On 18 June 2021, the album's 20th anniversary, Muse released a remixed and remastered version, Origin of Symmetry: XX Anniversary RemiXX. A collaboration with the producer Rich Costey, who worked on several later Muse albums, it features a "more open, dynamic and less crushed sound". The new mixes also restore elements that were originally muted or obscured, such as string sections on "Space Dementia", "Citizen Erased" and "Megalomania", and a harpsichord on "Micro Cuts". The album features new cover artwork by Sujin Kim. Monroe described the reissue as "definitive ... even more colossal and timeless".

== Track listing ==
All tracks are written by Matt Bellamy, except "Feeling Good" by Leslie Bricusse and Anthony Newley.

Original release
No.	Title	Length
1.	"New Born"	6:03
2.	"Bliss"	4:12
3.	"Space Dementia"	6:20
4.	"Hyper Music"	3:20
5.	"Plug In Baby"	3:40
6.	"Citizen Erased"	7:19
7.	"Micro Cuts"	3:38
8.	"Screenager"	4:20
9.	"Darkshines"	4:47
10.	"Feeling Good"	3:19
11.	"Megalomania"	4:40
Total length:		51:38

Japanese release
No.	Title	Length
12.	"Futurism"	3:26
Total length:		55:04

== Personnel ==
Personnel adapted from Origin of Symmetry liner notes.

Muse

- Matt Bellamy – lead vocals, guitars, keyboards; string arrangement, production, mixing
- Chris Wolstenholme – basses, backing vocals, vibraphone; production, mixing
- Dominic Howard – drums, percussion; production, mixing

Guest musicians

- Jacqueline Norrie – violin
- Sara Herbert – violin
- Clare Finnimore – viola
- Caroline Lavelle – cello

Artwork

- Blue Source – art direction
- William Eagar – cover image
- Darrell Gibbs – artwork
- Austin – artwork
- Leo Marcantonio – artwork
- Tomi Oladipo – artwork
- Butch Gordon – artwork
- Tim Berry – artwork
- Adam Cruickshank – artwork
- Marilyn Petridean – artwork
- Simon Earith – artwork
- David Foldvari – artwork

Technical personnel

- David Bottrill – production and engineering (tracks 1, 2, 5 and 9)
- John Leckie – production and engineering (tracks 3, 4, 6–8, 10 and 11)
- Ric Peet – engineering (tracks 3, 4, 6–8, 10 and 11)
- Steve Cooper – additional engineering (tracks 1, 2, 5 and 9)
- Chris Brown – additional engineering and programming (tracks 3, 4, 6–8, 10 and 11)
- Mark Thomas – assistant engineering (tracks 2, 4, 5 and 7)
- Claire Lewis – assistant engineering (tracks 3, 4, 6–8, 10 and 11)
- Damon Iddins – assistant engineering
- Mirek Styles – assistant engineering
- John Cornfield – mixing
- Ray Staff – mastering

== Charts ==
=== Weekly charts ===
Chart (2001–2021)	Peak position
Australian Albums (ARIA)	22
Austrian Albums (Ö3 Austria)	7
Belgian Albums (Ultratop Flanders)	9
Belgian Albums (Ultratop Wallonia)	2
Dutch Albums (Album Top 100)	19
Europe (European Top 100 Albums)	8
Finnish Albums (Suomen virallinen lista)	30
French Albums (SNEP)	2
German Albums (Offizielle Top 100)	17
Hungarian Albums (MAHASZ)	24
Irish Albums (IRMA)	3
Italian Albums (FIMI)	5
Japanese Albums (Oricon)	20
New Zealand Albums (RMNZ)	43
Norwegian Albums (VG-lista)	11
Scottish Albums (Official Charts)	3
Swiss Albums (Schweizer Hitparade)	14
UK Albums (Official Charts)	3
US Billboard 200	161

=== Year-end charts ===
Chart (2001)	Position
Belgian Albums (Ultratop Flanders)	50
Belgian Albums (Ultratop Wallonia)	46
Dutch Albums (Album Top 100)	67
European Albums (Music & Media)	91
French Albums (SNEP)	57
UK Albums (OCC)	74

== Certifications ==
Region	Certification	Certified units/sales
Australia (ARIA)	Platinum	70,000^{^}
Belgium (BRMA)	Gold	25,000^{*}
Germany (BVMI)	Gold	150,000^{‡}
Italy (FIMI) sales since 2009	Gold	25,000^{*}
Netherlands (NVPI)	Gold	40,000^{^}
Switzerland (IFPI Switzerland)	Gold	20,000^{^}
United Kingdom (BPI)	2× Platinum	600,000^{*}
^{*} Sales figures based on certification alone.^{^} Shipments figures based on certification alone.^{‡} Sales+streaming figures based on certification alone.

== Notes and references ==
Notes
