= Dead Star / In Your World =

Muse single

"Dead Star"

Single by Muse

from the album Hullabaloo Soundtrack
- A-side: "In Your World"
- B-side: "Futurism"; "Can't Take My Eyes Off You"
- Released: 17 June 2002
- Studio: Sawmills (Fowey, England)
- Length: 3:40
- Label: Taste
- Songwriter: Matt Bellamy
- Producers: John Cornfield; Muse

Muse singles chronology
"Hyper Music" / "Feeling Good" (2001)	"Dead Star" / "In Your World" (2002)	"Stockholm Syndrome" (2003)

"In Your World"

Single by Muse

from the album Hullabaloo Soundtrack
- A-side: "Dead Star"
- B-side: "Futurism"; "Can't Take My Eyes Off You"
- Released: 17 June 2002
- Studio: Sawmills (Fowey); Long View Farm (North Brookfield)
- Genre: Alternative rock; hard rock
- Length: 2:36
- Label: Taste
- Songwriter: Matt Bellamy
- Producers: John Cornfield; Muse; The Saint

Muse singles chronology
"Hyper Music" / "Feeling Good" (2001)	"In Your World" / "Dead Star" (2002)	"Stockholm Syndrome" (2003)

"Dead Star" and "In Your World" are two songs by English rock band Muse. Written for and included in a live form on their 2002 compilation album Hullabaloo Soundtrack, the songs were released as a double A-side single to promote the album, and as an extended play (EP) in Japan and France. The single reached number thirteen on the UK Singles Chart.

== Music video ==
A video for "In Your World" was also produced, included on the double A-side, which consisted of a live performance and was directed by Matt Askem. The video is considerably shorter than the audio-only live album version, with running times of 2:35 and 3:12 respectively. The video for "Dead Star" shows the band practising in a dark basement and was directed by Tim Qualtrough and Tom Kirk. It has a running time of 3:40, again shorter than the audio-only live album version which has a running time of 4:12. It was recorded in Winston Churchill's house in Brighton.

== Other usage in the media ==
The song was used in the British Soap Opera Emmerdale in September 2006, in which character Cain Dingle leaves the village with Sadie King whilst escaping from the police. The song was used multiple times in scenes, including when Cain blows up his car, and drives into the quarry.

== Live performances ==
"Dead Star" was only consistently performed in 2001 and 2002, but has made occasional appearances on all of the band's tours since it originally debuted, with the exception of the Simulation Theory World Tour.

"In Your World" has not been performed since 2002.

== Track listing ==
7"
No.	Title	Length
1.	"Dead Star"	3:40
2.	"In Your World"	2:35

'CD1'
No.	Title	Notes	Length
1.	"Dead Star"		3:40
2.	"In Your World"		2:35
3.	"Futurism"	Originally released as a bonus track on the Japanese version of Origin of Symmetry	3:27
4.	"Dead Star" (video)

'CD2'
No.	Title	Notes	Length
1.	"In Your World"		2:35
2.	"Dead Star"		3:40
3.	"Can't Take My Eyes Off You"	Frankie Valli cover	3:30
4.	"In Your World" (video)

French EP
No.	Title	Notes	Length
1.	"Dead Star"		3:40
2.	"In Your World"		2:35
3.	"Futurism"		3:27
4.	"Can't Take My Eyes Off You"		3:30
5.	"Dead Star" (instrumental)	It doesn't appear on the reissue of the French EP	3:40
6.	"Dead Star" (video)
7.	"In Your World" (video)

Japanese EP
No.	Title	Length
1.	"Dead Star"	3:40
2.	"In Your World"	2:35
3.	"Can't Take My Eyes Off You"	3:30
4.	"In Your World" (live)	3:10
5.	"Dead Star" (live)	4:11

== Charts ==
Chart (2002)	Peak position
Europe (Eurochart Hot 100)	53
France (SNEP)	76
Ireland (IRMA)	32
Netherlands (Single Top 100)	69
Scottish Singles Sales (Official Charts)	14
UK Singles (Official Charts)	13
UK Indie (Official Charts)	2
