= Plug In Baby =

2001 single by Muse

- Standard artwork

Single by Muse

from the album Origin of Symmetry
- B-side: "Nature_1"; "Execution Commentary"; "Spiral Static"; "Bedroom Acoustics"
- Released: 28 February 2001
- Studio: Ridge Farm (Rusper)
- Genre: Alternative rock; heavy metal
- Length: 3:39 (album/single version); 3:18 (radio edit)
- Label: Taste
- Songwriter: Matt Bellamy
- Producers: David Bottrill; Muse

Muse singles chronology
"Muscle Museum" (2000)	"Plug In Baby" (2001)	"New Born" (2001)

Music video
- "Plug In Baby" by Muse on YouTube

"Plug In Baby" is a song by English rock band Muse. It was released as the lead single from the band's second studio album, Origin of Symmetry (2001), on 28 February 2001 in Japan and on 12 March 2001 in the United Kingdom.

The song became the band's highest-charting single in the UK when it peaked at number 11 on the UK Singles Chart, until it was surpassed by "Time Is Running Out", which peaked at number 8 in 2003. Today, "Plug In Baby" is considered one of Muse's most notable songs, and has been featured on the live albums HAARP (2008) and Live at Rome Olympic Stadium (2013).

== Background and composition ==
"Plug In Baby" is written in the key of B minor (although the song does not begin or end on the tonic chord of the key). It is mainly guitar and bass-driven, and moves at a tempo of 136 bpm. The guitar riff is based on the harmonic minor scale.

The beginning of the riff shows similarities to the toccata from Bach's "Toccata and Fugue in D minor, BWV 565" and the beginning of Samuel Barber's "Adagio for Strings".

One of the B-sides to the single, "Execution Commentary", was described by Bellamy as the "worst song I've ever written".

== Recording ==
The 1997 studio demo of the song lacked the main riff of the song, although there were numerous similarities in the lyrics and structure. "Plug In Baby" was to be re-recorded under the wishes of Maverick to coincide with the US tour promoting the Origin of Symmetry album, as Maverick wished Bellamy to tone down the falsetto on the song as well as on the album. The band spent a few days at Long View Farm in North Brookfield, Massachusetts, in September 2001 recording this new version, but were left unsatisfied by the result. Consequently, Maverick dropped Muse in the US market and Origin of Symmetry remained unreleased in the country until 2005.

== Legacy ==
The song is often praised for its opening guitar riff, which Total Guitar magazine readers voted as the number 1 ultimate guitar riff of the 2000s and the 13th best of all time in 2004. In 2011, Spinner.com named "Plug In Baby" the 46th greatest guitar riff of all time, citing its "play on Bach's 'Toccata and Fugue in D minor, BWV 565'." The song has been featured on the video games Guitar Hero 5 and Rocksmith.

== Track listing ==
All tracks are written by Matt Bellamy.

'CD1'
No.	Title	Length
1.	"Plug In Baby"	3:40
2.	"Nature_1"	3:40
3.	"Execution Commentary"	2:30
4.	"Plug In Baby" (music video)	3:41

'CD2'
No.	Title	Length
1.	"Plug In Baby"	3:41
2.	"Spiral Static"	4:46
3.	"Bedroom Acoustics"	2:37

7-inch vinyl and compact cassette
No.	Title	Length
1.	"Plug In Baby"	3:39
2.	"Nature_1"	3:40

== Personnel ==
Personnel adapted from Origin of Symmetry liner notes.

Muse

- Matt Bellamy – lead vocals, guitar, production, mixing
- Chris Wolstenholme – bass, backing vocals, production, mixing
- Dominic Howard – drums, production, mixing

Additional personnel

- David Bottrill – production, engineering
- John Cornfield – mixing
- Tanya Andrew – artwork

== Charts ==
Chart (2001)	Peak position
Australia (ARIA)	57
Europe (Eurochart Hot 100)	33
France (SNEP)	40
Italy (FIMI)	42
Netherlands (Single Top 100)	63
Switzerland (Schweizer Hitparade)	88
Scottish Singles Sales (Official Charts)	13
UK Singles (Official Charts)	11
UK Indie (Official Charts)	1

== Certifications ==
Region	Certification	Certified units/sales
New Zealand (RMNZ)	Gold	15,000^{‡}
United Kingdom (BPI)	Platinum	600,000^{‡}
^{‡} Sales+streaming figures based on certification alone.

== Release history ==
Region	Date	Format(s)	Label(s)	Ref.
Japan	28 February 2001	CD	maximum10	
United Kingdom	12 March 2001	7-inch vinyl; CD; cassette	Mushroom	
Australia	26 March 2001	CD	Festival Mushroom	
