= Hyper Music / Feeling Good =

2001 single by Muse

"Hyper Music"

Single by Muse

from the album Origin of Symmetry
- A-side: "Feeling Good"
- B-side: "Shine"
- Released: 19 November 2001
- Studio: Real World (Wiltshire, England); Sawmills (Fowey, England)
- Genre: Art punk; funk metal
- Length: 3:23
- Label: Taste
- Songwriter: Matt Bellamy
- Producers: John Leckie; Muse

Muse singles chronology
"Bliss" (2001)	"Hyper Music" / "Feeling Good" (2001)	"Dead Star" / "In Your World" (2002)

Music video
- "Hyper Music" on YouTube

"Feeling Good"

Single by Muse

from the album Origin of Symmetry
- A-side: "Hyper Music"
- B-side: "Please, Please, Please Let Me Get What I Want"
- Released: 19 November 2001
- Studio: Real World (Wiltshire)
- Genre: Alternative rock
- Length: 3:18
- Label: Taste
- Songwriters: Leslie Bricusse; Anthony Newley
- Producers: John Leckie; Muse

Muse singles chronology
"Bliss" (2001)	"Hyper Music" / "Feeling Good" (2001)	"Dead Star" / "In Your World" (2002)

Music video
- "Feeling Good" on YouTube

"Hyper Music" and "Feeling Good" are songs by the English rock band Muse, released in 2001 as a double A-side. It was as the fourth and final single from their second album, Origin of Symmetry. The songs reached No. 1 on the UK Rock Chart and UK Indie Chart, also seeing minor success on English, French and Polish pop charts.

== Composition ==
"Hyper Music" is a breakup song, described as art punk and funk metal, written by vocalist and guitarist Matt Bellamy. "Feeling Good" is an alternative rock cover of a song written by Leslie Bricusse and Anthony Newley for the 1964 musical The Roar of the Greasepaint – The Smell of the Crowd, previously covered by soul and blues singer Nina Simone.

A softer, rearranged version of "Hyper Music" was recorded under the title of "Hyper Chondriac Music" and included on Muse's 2002 compilation album Hullabaloo Soundtrack.

== Music videos ==
Both music videos were directed by David Slade. The music video for "Hyper Music" begins with a shot of a room that has a red floor and greyish walls with Bellamy slouching with a mic in front of him, and a guitar in his hands. The video then changes to a shot next to Bellamy, as he starts playing the song. Seemingly out of nowhere, the rest of the band appears behind him as they all start playing, with shots interspersed with Bellamy playing his guitar alone, before stabilising into just the band playing the song, with a few shots of just Bellamy, with the shots of purely Bellamy increasing when the beginning riff is repeated. When the chorus repeats for the final time a crowd of people appears, jumping around the band. Nearly the entire video is shot very shakily, with apparent lens flares appearing at several moments.

The music video for "Feeling Good" is rather similar. It begins with Bellamy playing a keyboard instrument. There is clearly a light shining on him. The light's cause is a hole in the roof, from which red petals are falling down on Bellamy. Shots of bizarre looking people are shown walking into light in the same room, with them continuing for the first 30 seconds. As the band yet again appears behind Bellamy, the petals' falling gets heavier. At a bit over the one minute mark the lights mostly disappear, as Bellamy starts singing into a megaphone, accompanied by a change in Bellamy's voice to a buzzing distortion. The lights turn back on as the distortion turns off, and the megaphone is gone, but now the warped looking people are standing behind the band. The people slowly begin climbing up the walls, presumably to escape, as the band keeps playing, with many of the people just staring at the band. In the final moments of the video the majority of the people are seen crawling on the walls.

== Release ==
"Hyper Music"/"Feeling Good" was released on 19 November 2001 as a 7-inch vinyl single and two CD singles. It reached number 24 in the UK Singles Chart—the lowest of all four singles released from Origin of Symmetry—though sold better than all of them except "Plug in Baby".

On 10 November 2001 the band appeared on BBC's Later... with Jools Holland and performed both "Hyper Music" and "Feeling Good".

== Legacy ==
"Feeling Good" was ranked as the fifth best cover version in a poll by Total Guitar in 2008. Later in 2010, Muse's cover of "Feeling Good" was ranked by NME as the greatest cover song of all time in September 2010. Over 15,000 people voted it to number one, beating The Beatles' cover of "Twist and Shout" and Johnny Cash's cover of "Hurt". In 2014, a BBC poll saw it voted the ninth best cover version ever.

Muse successfully sued Nescafé in 2003 when their version of "Feeling Good" was used in a television advert without their permission, donating the £500,000 compensation they received to Oxfam. Nescafé later replaced it with the Nina Simone version. "Feeling Good" is used in Virgin Atlantic's 2010 commercial run in the United States, "001".

"Feeling Good" has been featured in the film Seven Pounds, and the television series John from Cincinnati, Doctor Who Confidential, Queer as Folk, Luther, The Handmaid's Tale, Shameless and Tracy Beaker Returns. Season 8 American Idol runner-up Adam Lambert performed "Feeling Good" on the show, using the arrangement of Muse's version. The song is also featured in the video game The Saboteur.

== Track listings ==
7" (MUSH97S)
No.	Title	Writer(s)	Length
1.	"Hyper Music"	Matt Bellamy	3:23
2.	"Feeling Good"	Leslie Bricusse; Anthony Newley	3:18
Total length:			6:41

CD1: "Hyper Music/Feeling Good" (MUSH97CDS)
No.	Title	Writer(s)	Length
1.	"Hyper Music"	Bellamy	3:23
2.	"Feeling Good" (live)	Bricusse; Newley	3:01
3.	"Shine"	Bellamy	3:16
4.	"Hyper Music" (music video)	Bellamy	3:23
Total length:			13:03

CD2: "Feeling Good/Hyper Music" (MUSH97CDSX)
No.	Title	Writer(s)	Length
1.	"Feeling Good"	Bricusse; Newley	3:18
2.	"Hyper Music" (live)	Bellamy	3:31
3.	"Please, Please, Please, Let Me Get What I Want" (The Smiths cover)	Morrissey; Johnny Marr	1:58
4.	"Feeling Good" (music video)	Bricusse; Newley	3:18
Total length:			12:05

Promo 1 (MUSE 18)
No.	Title	Writer(s)	Length
1.	"Feeling Good"	Bricusse; Newley	3:18
2.	"Hyper Music" (radio edit)	Bellamy	2:58
Total length:			6:16

Promo 2 (MUSE 19)
No.	Title	Writer(s)	Length
1.	"Feeling Good" (radio edit)	Bricusse; Newley	3:18
2.	"Hyper Music" (radio edit)	Bellamy	2:58
Total length:			6:16

== Personnel ==
Personnel are adapted from the Origin of Symmetry liner notes.

=== Hyper Music ===
Muse

- Matt Bellamy – vocals, guitar
- Chris Wolstenholme – bass guitar
- Dominic Howard – drums

=== Feeling Good ===
Muse

- Matt Bellamy – vocals, Wurlitzer electric piano, megaphone, string arrangements
- Chris Wolstenholme – bass guitar, double bass
- Dominic Howard – drums

Additional performers

- Jacqueline Norrie – violin
- Sara Herbert – violin
- Clare Finnimore – viola
- Caroline Lavelle – cello

=== Technical personnel ===
- John Leckie – production, engineering
- Ric Peet – engineering
- Chris Brown – additional engineering and programming
- Claire Lewis – assistant engineering
- Damon Iddins – assistant engineering
- Mirek Styles – assistant engineering
- John Cornfield – mixing
- Ray Staff – mastering

== Charts and certifications ==
=== Weekly charts ===
Chart	Peak position
French Singles Chart	137
Polish Singles Chart	6
UK Singles Chart	24
UK Indie Chart	1
UK Rock Chart	1

=== Sales and certifications ===
Region	Certification	Certified units/sales
United Kingdom (BPI)	Gold	400,000^{‡}
^{‡} Sales+streaming figures based on certification alone.

== Release history ==
Region	Date	Label	Format	Catalog
United Kingdom	19 November 2001	Taste; Mushroom	7"	MUSH97S
United Kingdom	19 November 2001	Taste; Mushroom	2CD	MUSH97CDS; MUSH97CDSX
United Kingdom	19 November 2001	Taste; Mushroom	2 promos	MUSE18; MUSE19
