= Bliss (Muse song) =

2001 single by Muse

- 'CD1' cover

Single by Muse

from the album Origin of Symmetry
- B-side: "The Gallery"; "Hyper Chondriac Music"
- Released: 20 August 2001
- Studio: Ridge Farm (Rusper); Sawmills (Fowey)
- Genre: Alternative rock; progressive rock; space rock
- Length: 4:13 (album version); 4:36 (single version); 3:46 (radio edit)
- Label: Taste
- Songwriter: Matt Bellamy
- Producers: David Bottrill; Muse

Muse singles chronology
"New Born" (2001)	"Bliss" (2001)	"Hyper Music" / "Feeling Good" (2001)

Music video
- "Bliss" by Muse on YouTube

"Bliss" is a song by English rock band Muse, released on 20 August 2001 as the third single from their second studio album Origin of Symmetry (2001).

== Composition ==
"Bliss" is a space rock song that moves at a tempo of 129 bpm. The song opens and ends with synthesiser arpeggios, with the majority of the song driven by bass and synth. Bellamy's vocal lines in the song span from F3 to E5, except for live performances, where he hits a G5 in the final chorus. The song is written in the key of C minor and modulates to the parallel major key during the chorus.

Matt Bellamy has said "Bliss" is his favourite song "because it's got all these 80s arpeggios and keyboards on it which remind me of some music I heard on some children's music programme when I was five. I think I ripped it off that. And that reminds me of when I was a bit simpler, a bit more of a pleasant state."

== Music video ==
The music video features Matt Bellamy standing on a ledge then the song begins as he leaps and begins falling through a shaft in space. The shaft looks to be on a space station possibly on an abandoned planet, but the clear technology looks to be futuristic and well beyond what exists at this time. The other band members can be seen throughout the video watching Matt Bellamy as he falls each in their own pods along the shaft that Matt Bellamy is falling through. As the song reaches its climax he exits the shaft into space and towards what looks like a nebula or a star's photo-sphere. At that point, the light causes him to fade out as he begins to turn into dust as he edges closer to a white light and the song fades out.

== Release ==
Bliss reached number 22 in the UK Singles Chart, making it one of the most successful singles from Origin of Symmetry.

== Live performances ==
During the tour in promotion of Origin of Symmetry, "Bliss" was usually played as the final song, often coinciding with the release of giant confetti-filled balloons from the venues' roof. The song was a live staple until 2006, and has made occasional appearances on all of the band's subsequent tours.

== Track listing ==
- 'CD1'
1. "Bliss" – 4:36
2. "The Gallery" – 3:32
3. "Screenager" (live) – 4:00
4. "Bliss" (video) – 4:36
- 'CD2'
1. "Bliss" – 4:36
2. "Hyper Chondriac Music" – 5:30
3. "New Born" (live) – 5:57
- 7" vinyl
1. "Bliss" – 4:36
2. "Hyper Chondriac Music" – 5:30

== Personnel ==
Personnel adapted from Origin of Symmetry liner notes.

- Matt Bellamy – vocals, guitars, synthesisers
- Chris Wolstenholme – bass
- Dominic Howard – drums

== Charts ==
Chart (2001)	Peak position
Europe (Eurochart Hot 100)	77
France (SNEP)	87
Netherlands (Dutch Top 40)	40
Netherlands (Single Top 100)	70
Scottish Singles Sales (Official Charts)	20
UK Singles (Official Charts)	22
UK Indie (Official Charts)	2
