= Taste Media =

UK record label

Taste Media is a record label and production company that has released records for bands such as Muse and Shed Seven. The company was formed by Safta Jaffery (former executive of Decca and Magnet Records A&R) and Dennis Smith, who owned the Sawmills recording studio in Cornwall.

== History ==
Taste Media recorded three of Muse's albums, Showbiz, Origin of Symmetry and Absolution. Whilst the recordings by Muse were licensed to Mushroom Records in the United Kingdom, with the label credit being split between Taste Media and Mushroom, later acts were issued independently. These independent releases included One Minute Silence's One Life Fits All, Serafin's No Push Collide, along with Shed Seven's Where Have You Been Tonight? live album and their "Why Can't I Be You?" single, both released in 2003.

The publishing side of Taste's repertoire was handled by sister company Taste Music who retain the publishing rights to Muse's first three albums and also handle the compositions of Buffseeds, One Minute Silence, and Sundae Club.

== See also ==
- Lists of record labels
