= List of songs recorded by Muse =

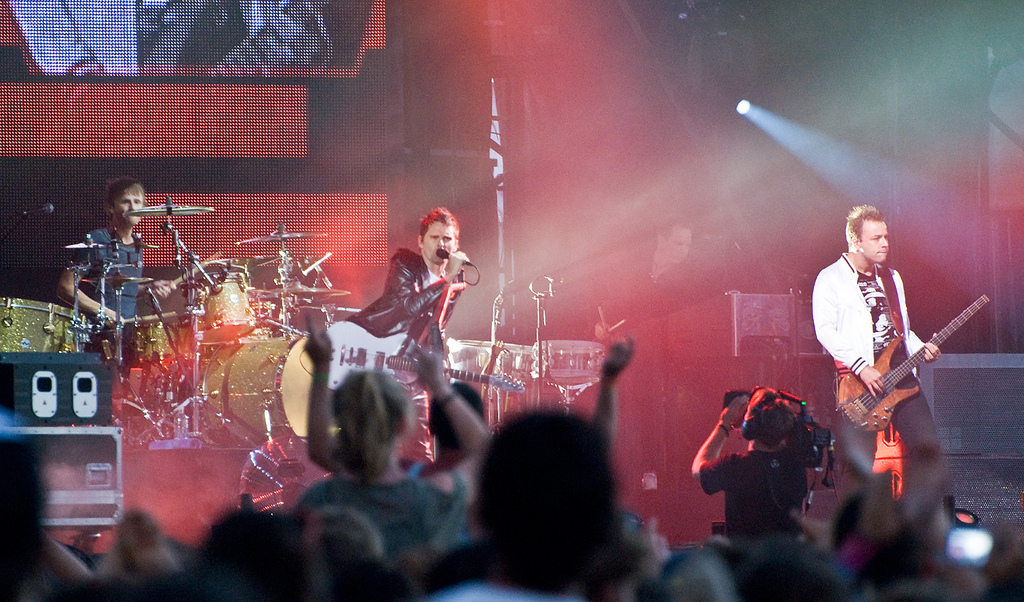
Muse, left to right: Dominic Howard, Matt Bellamy, touring member Morgan Nicholls (back) and Chris Wolstenholme.

Muse are an English rock band from Teignmouth, Devon. Originally formed in 1994, the band features vocalist, guitarist and keyboardist Matt Bellamy, bassist and backing vocalist Chris Wolstenholme, and drummer Dominic Howard. The band released their debut full-length studio album Showbiz in 1999, songwriting for which was credited entirely to Bellamy. Origin of Symmetry followed in 2001, which once again credited Bellamy for songwriting, but also featured the band's first cover version recording in the form of "Feeling Good".

In 2002 the band released their first live video album Hullabaloo: Live at Le Zenith, Paris, which was accompanied by Hullabaloo Soundtrack featuring a number of B-sides from previously released singles and live tracks from the video album. The Hullabaloo albums also spawned one single, "Dead Star / In Your World", which featured a cover of Frankie Valli's "Can't Take My Eyes Off You" as one of its B-sides. Absolution was released in 2003, which is the band's only album released to date to credit all three members for composition of the music.

Muse returned in 2006 with their fourth album Black Holes and Revelations, which reverted to crediting solely Bellamy for songwriting. In 2009 this was followed by The Resistance, on which the song "United States of Eurasia" featured elements from Frédéric Chopin's Nocturne in E-flat major, Op. 9, No. 2, and "I Belong to You" featured elements from Camille Saint-Saëns' "Mon cœur s'ouvre à ta voix". "Neutron Star Collision (Love Is Forever)", a single from the romantic fantasy film The Twilight Saga: Eclipse, was released the following year.

The 2nd Law was released in 2012, which featured the first songs written and sung by Wolstenholme: "Save Me" and "Liquid State". The band's seventh studio album, Drones, was released in 2015, once again crediting Bellamy alone.

The band's eighth studio album, Simulation Theory, was released in 2018. It featured synthesisers and was influenced by science fiction and the simulation hypothesis. Their ninth album, Will of the People (2022), combined many genres and themes from their previous albums.

== Songs ==
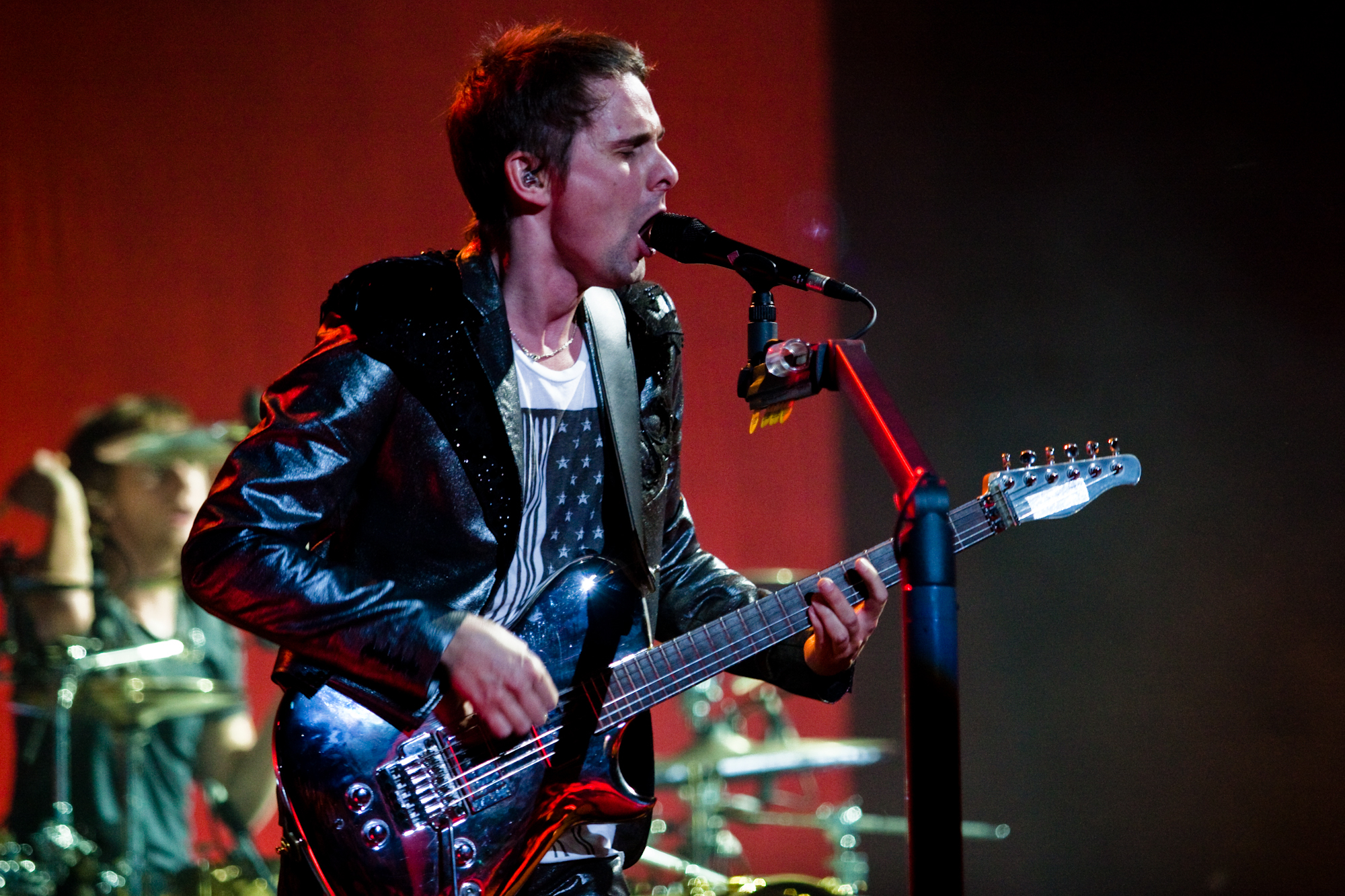
Muse frontman Matt Bellamy has been credited with writing the majority of the band's songs.

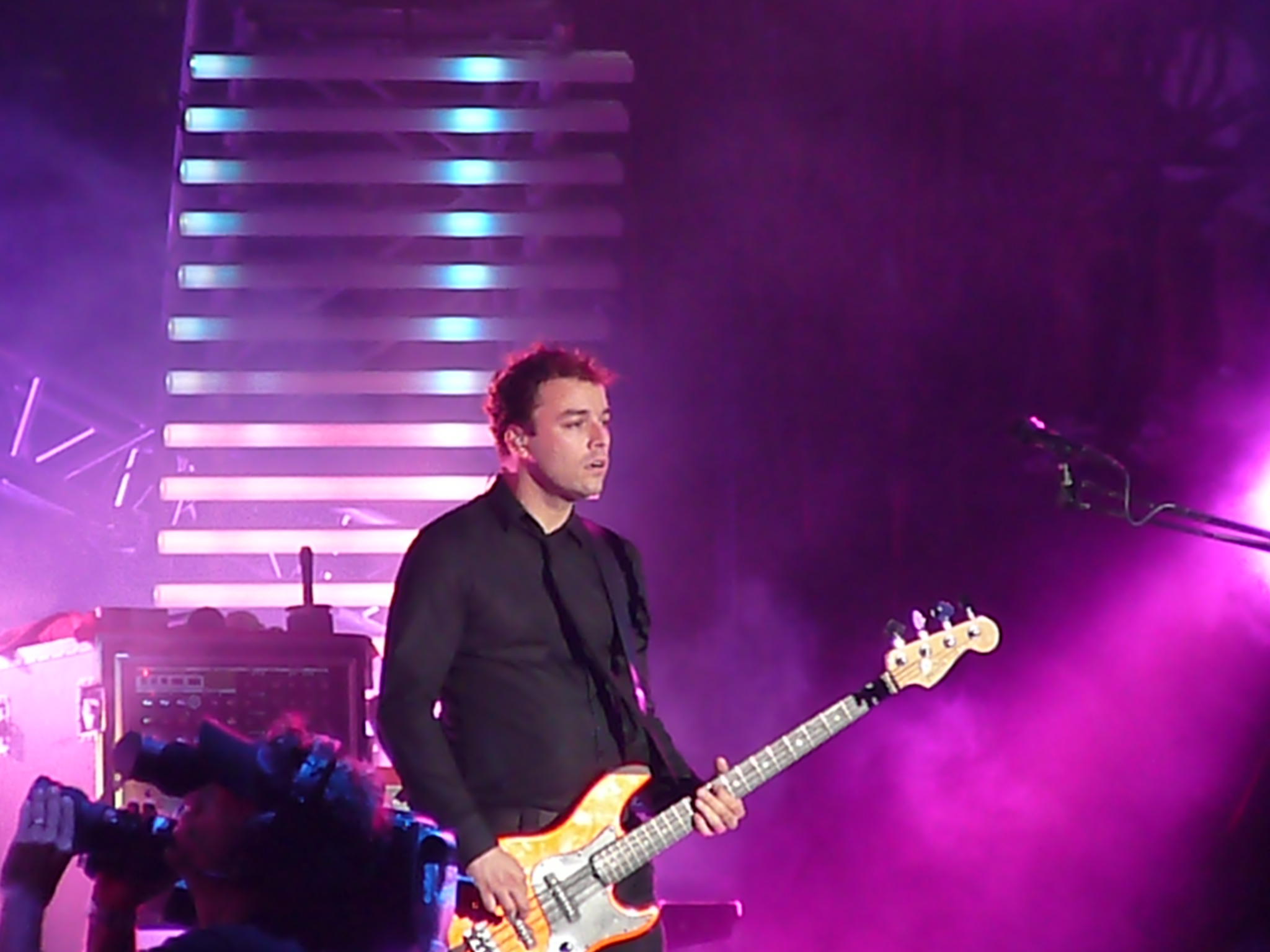
Chris Wolstenholme wrote two songs on The 2nd Law, and was co-credited for music on Absolution and The Wow! Signal.

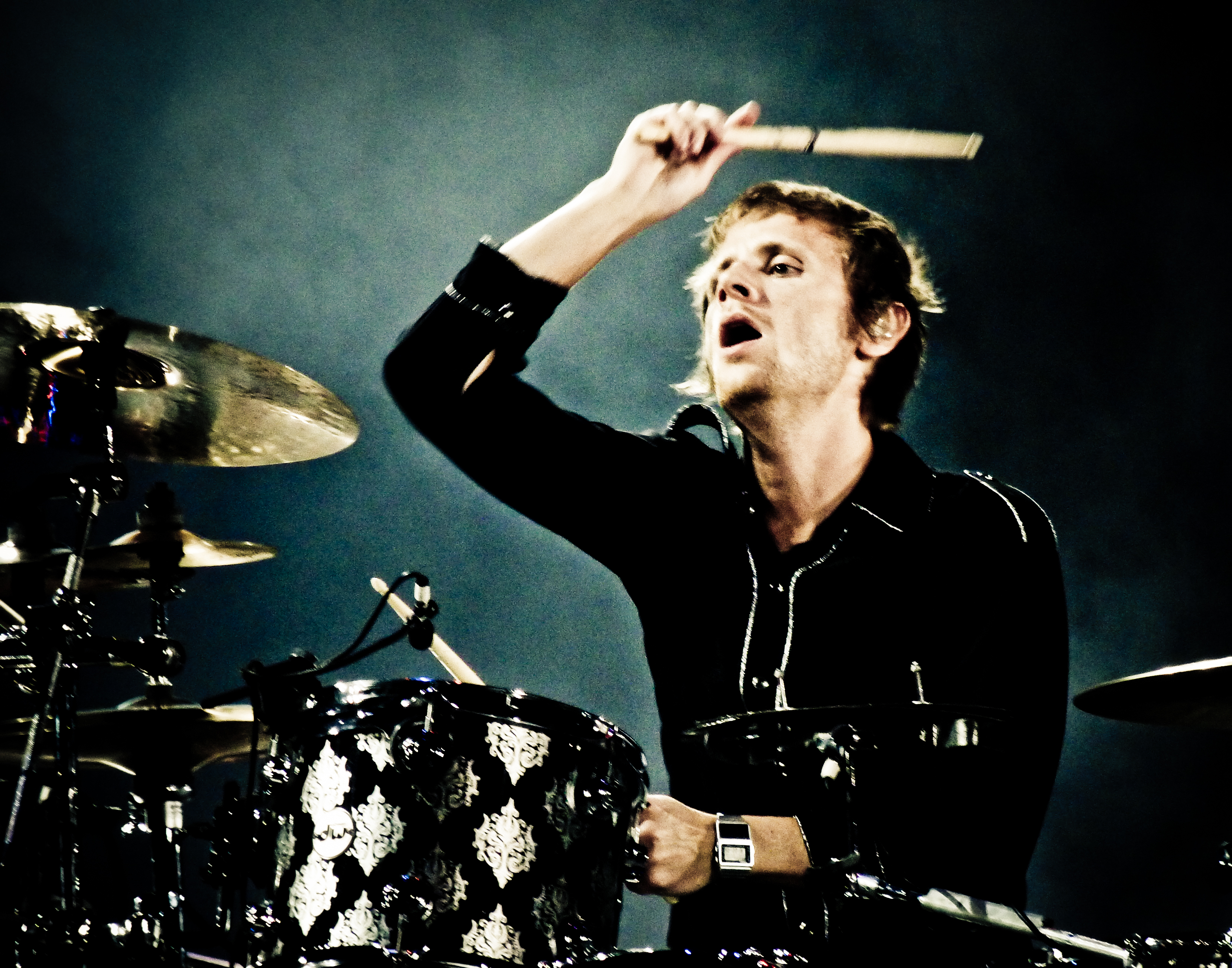
Drummer Dominic Howard was co-credited alongside Bellamy and Wolstenholme on Absolution and The Wow! Signal.

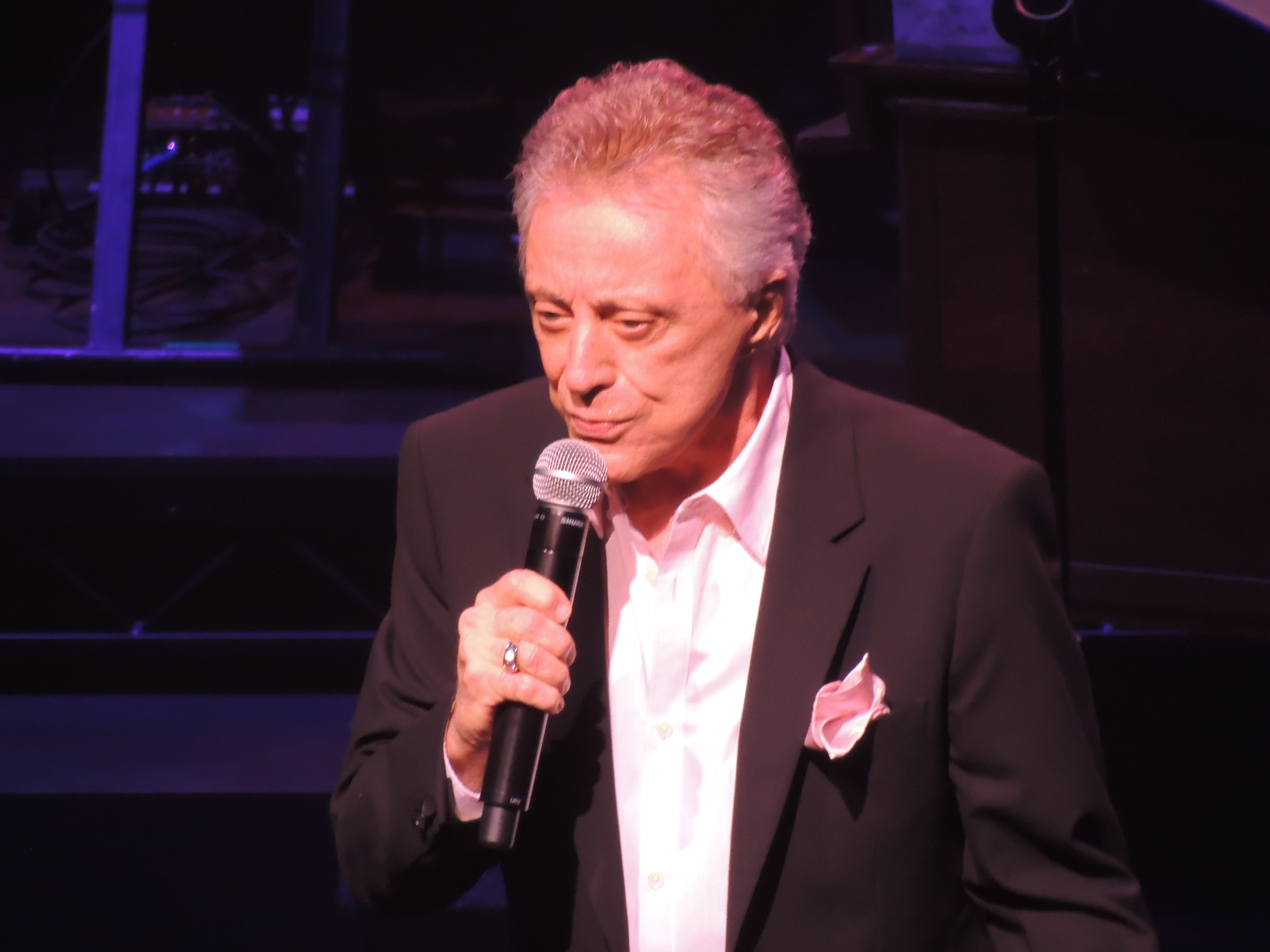
Muse released a cover of "Can't Take My Eyes Off You", originally recorded by Frankie Valli, in 2002.

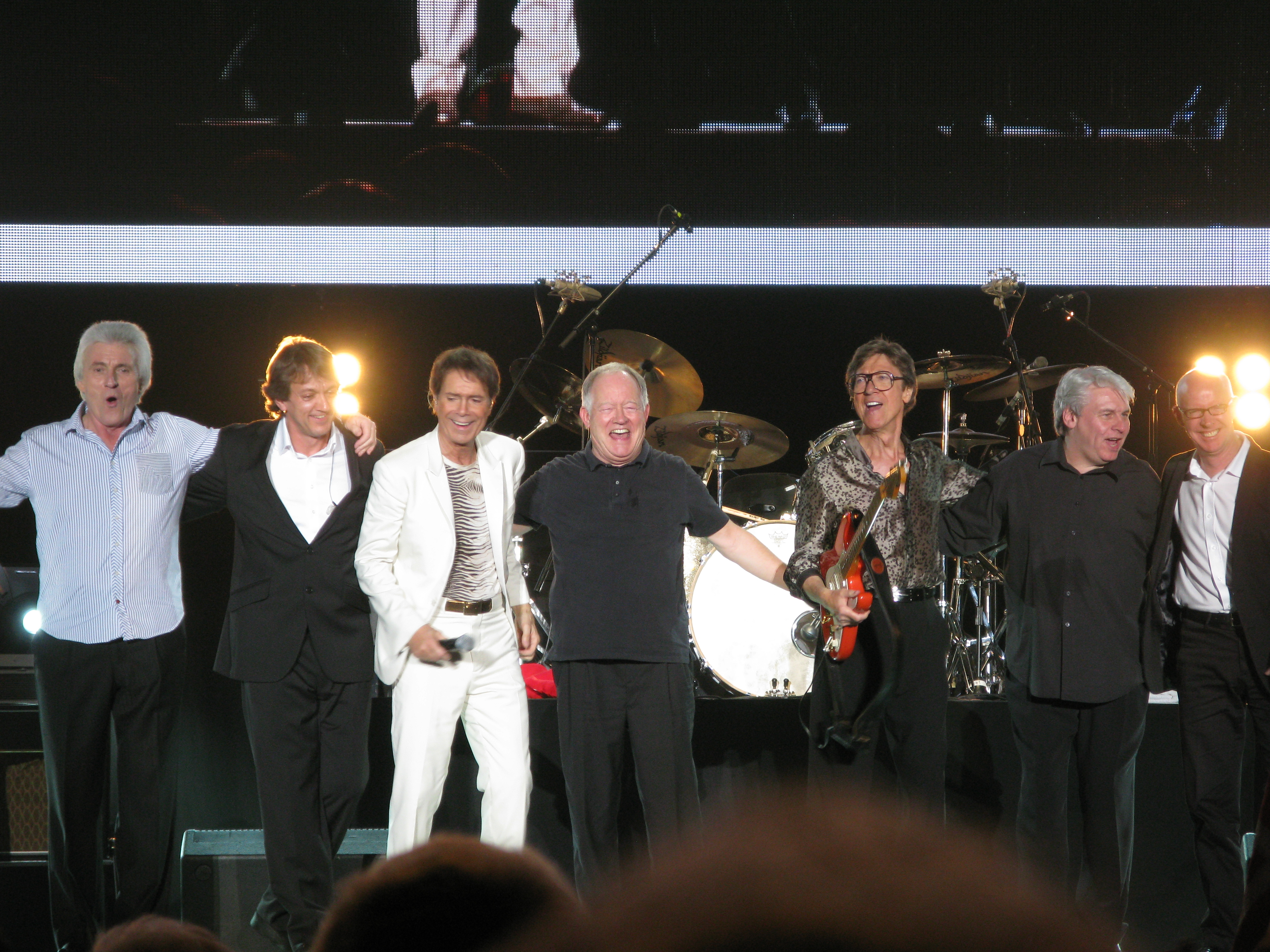
The band released a recording of "Man of Mystery", originally by The Shadows, in 2007.

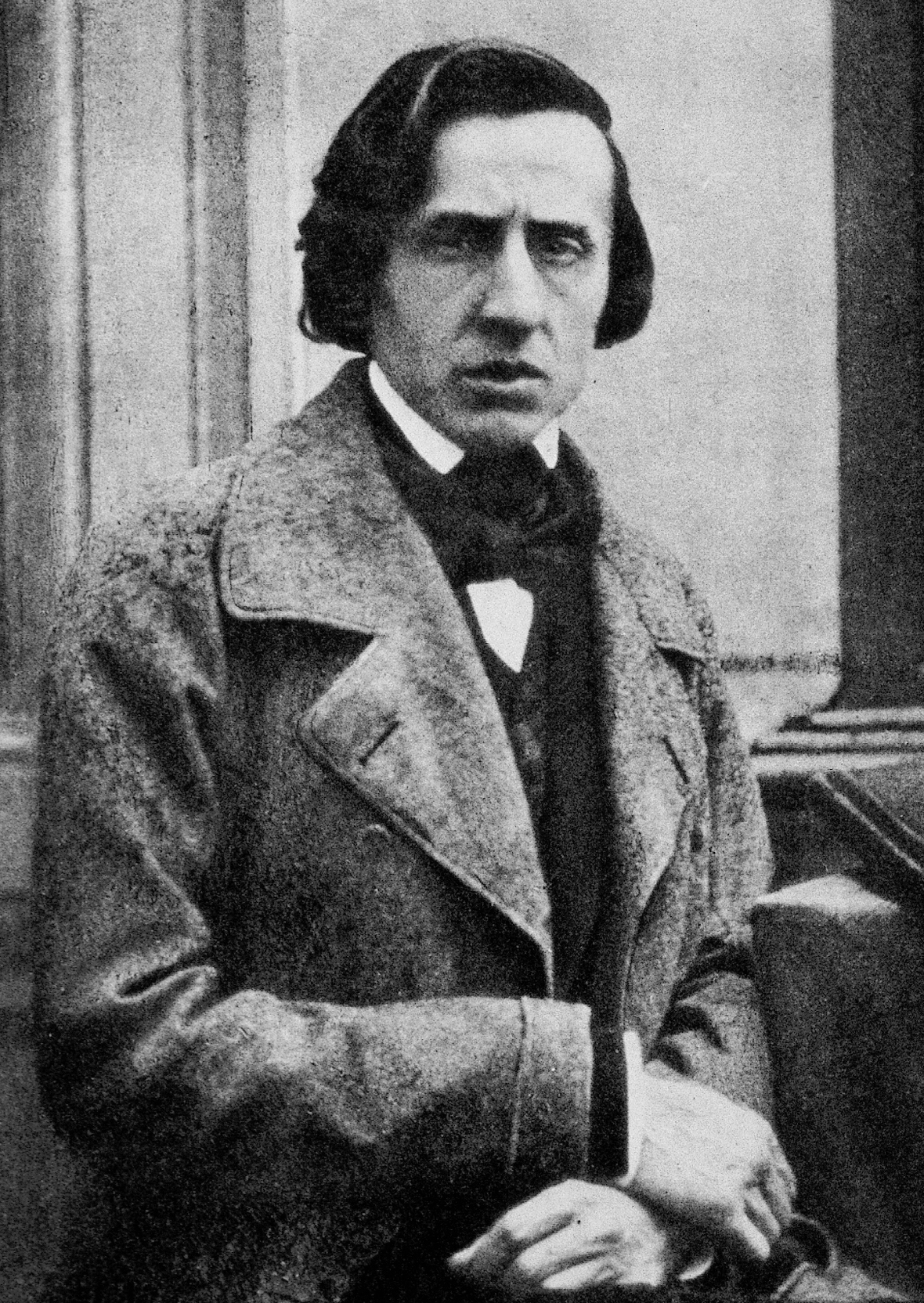
"United States of Eurasia" contains elements of Nocturne in E-flat major, Op. 9, No. 2 by Frédéric Chopin.

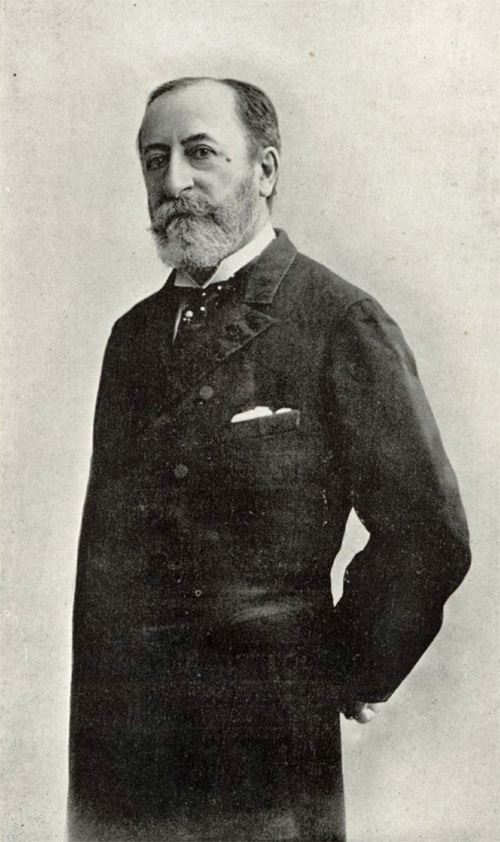
"I Belong to You" includes "Mon cœur s'ouvre à ta voix", written by composer Camille Saint-Saëns.

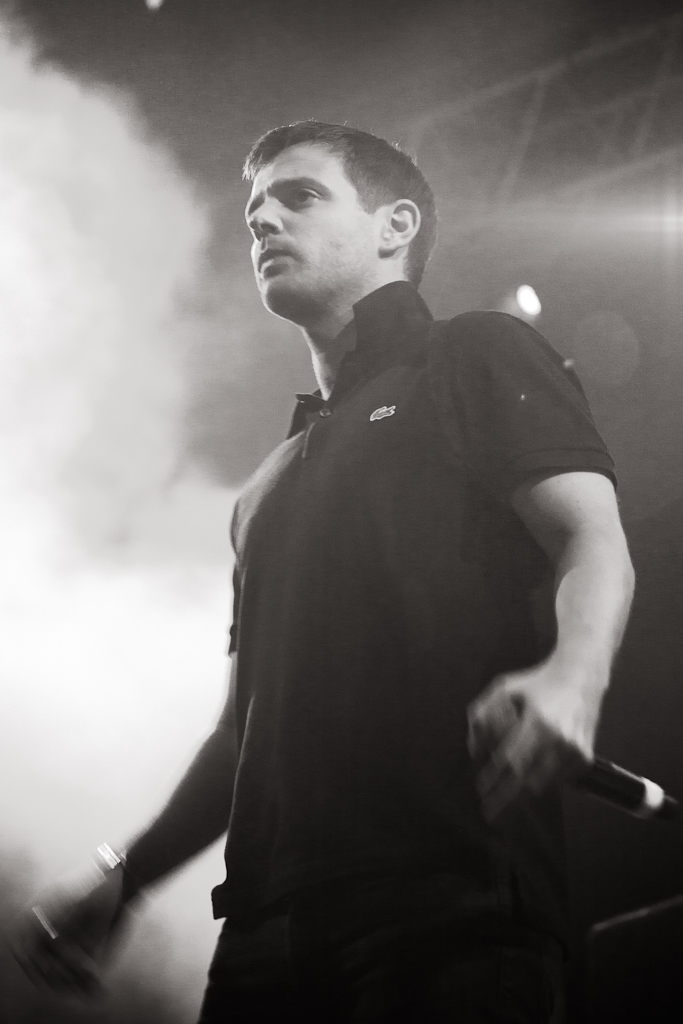
Muse collaborated with Mike Skinner on the "Uprising" B-side "Who Knows Who".

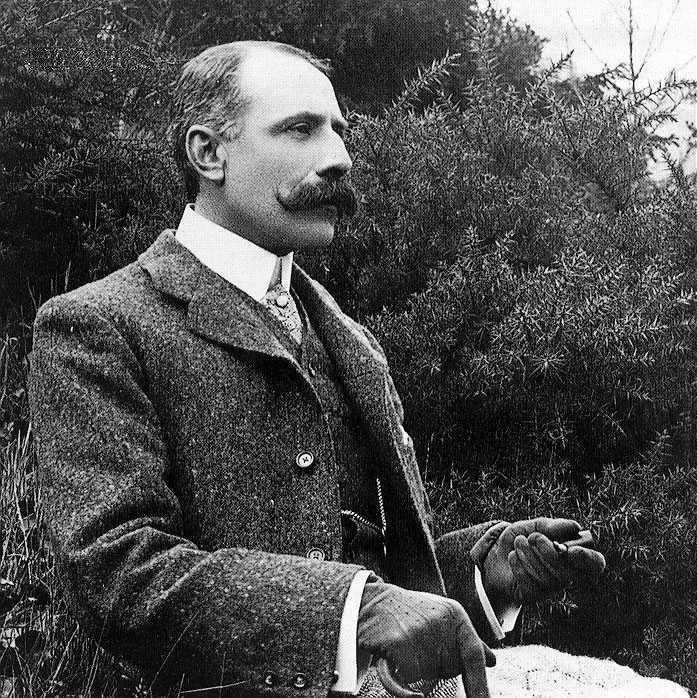
"The Globalist" contains elements of Variation IX (Adagio) "Nimrod" by Edward Elgar.

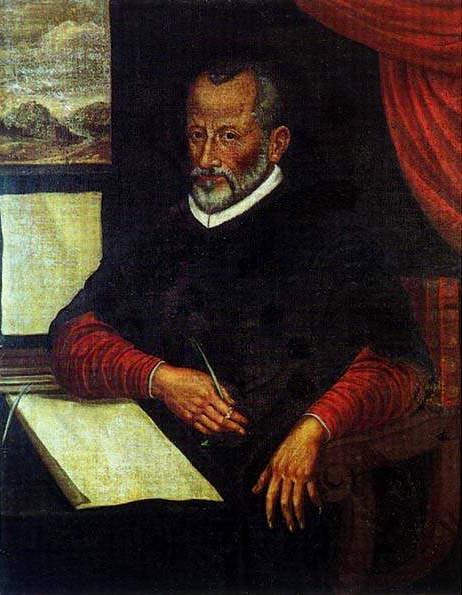
"Drones" is a cover of "Sanctus and Benedictus" by Giovanni Pierluigi da Palestrina.

Key
†	Indicates song released as a single
‡	Indicates song written by the whole band

Title	Writer(s)	Release	Year	Ref.
"The 2nd Law: Isolated System"	Matt Bellamy	The 2nd Law	2012	
"The 2nd Law: Unsustainable"	Matt Bellamy	The 2nd Law	2012	
"Aftermath"	Matt Bellamy	Drones	2015	
"Agitated"	Matt Bellamy	"Uno"	1999	
"Algorithm"	Matt Bellamy	Simulation Theory	2018	
"Animals"	Matt Bellamy	The 2nd Law	2012	
"Apocalypse Please" †	Matt Bellamy; Chris Wolstenholme; Dominic Howard ‡	Absolution	2003	
"Ashamed"	Matt Bellamy	"Sunburn"	2000	
"Assassin"	Matt Bellamy	Black Holes and Revelations	2006	
"Be with You" †	Matt Bellamy; Dominic Howard; Chris Wolstenholme; Dan Lancaster ‡	The Wow! Signal	2026	
"Bedroom Acoustics"	Matt Bellamy	"Plug In Baby"	2001	
"Big Freeze"	Matt Bellamy	The 2nd Law	2012	
"Blackout"	Matt Bellamy; Chris Wolstenholme; Dominic Howard ‡	Absolution	2003	
"Bliss" †	Matt Bellamy	Origin of Symmetry	2001	
"Blockades"	Matt Bellamy	Simulation Theory	2018	
"Break It to Me"	Matt Bellamy	Simulation Theory	2018	
"Butterflies and Hurricanes" †	Matt Bellamy; Chris Wolstenholme; Dominic Howard ‡	Absolution	2003	
"Can't Take My Eyes Off You" (Note: "Can't Take My Eyes Off You" was originally recorded by Frankie Valli.)	Bob Crewe; Bob Gaudio	"Dead Star / In Your World"	2002	
"Cave" †	Matt Bellamy	Showbiz	1999	
"Citizen Erased"	Matt Bellamy	Origin of Symmetry	2001	
"City of Delusion"	Matt Bellamy	Black Holes and Revelations	2006	
"Coma"	Matt Bellamy	"Cave"	1999	
"Compliance" †	Matt Bellamy	Will of the People	2022	
"Con-Science"	Matt Bellamy	"Muscle Museum"	1999	
"Crying Shame"	Matt Bellamy	"Supermassive Black Hole"	2006	
"Cryogen"	Matt Bellamy; Dominic Howard; Chris Wolstenholme; Dan Lancaster ‡	The Wow! Signal	2026	
"The Dark Forest"	Matt Bellamy	The Wow! Signal	2026	
"The Dark Side" †	Matt Bellamy	Simulation Theory	2018	
"Darkshines"	Matt Bellamy	Origin of Symmetry	2001	
"Dead Inside" †	Matt Bellamy	Drones	2015	
"Dead Star" †	Matt Bellamy	Dead Star / In Your World	2002	
"Defector"	Matt Bellamy	Drones	2015	
"Dig Down" †	Matt Bellamy	Simulation Theory	2018	
"Do We Need This?"	Matt Bellamy	"Muscle Museum"	1999	
"[Drill Sergeant]"	Matt Bellamy	Drones	2015	
"Drones"	Matt Bellamy; Giovanni Pierluigi da Palestrina (Note: "Drones" contains elements of "Sanctus and Benedictus", composed by Giovanni Pierluigi da Palestrina.)	Drones	2015	
"Easily"	Matt Bellamy	"Starlight"	2006	
"Endlessly"	Matt Bellamy; Chris Wolstenholme; Dominic Howard ‡	Absolution	2003	
"Escape" (Note: "Escape" is also known as "Escape Your Meaningless".)	Matt Bellamy	Showbiz	1999	
"Eternally Missed"	Matt Bellamy; Chris Wolstenholme; Dominic Howard ‡	"Hysteria"	2003	
"Euphoria"	Matt Bellamy	Will of the People	2022	
"Execution Commentary"	Matt Bellamy	"Plug In Baby"	2001	
"Exo-Politics"	Matt Bellamy	Black Holes and Revelations	2006	
"Exogenesis: Symphony Part 1 (Overture)" †	Matt Bellamy	The Resistance	2009	
"Exogenesis: Symphony Part 2 (Cross-Pollination)" †	Matt Bellamy	The Resistance	2009	
"Exogenesis: Symphony Part 3 (Redemption)" †	Matt Bellamy	The Resistance	2009	
"Explorers"	Matt Bellamy	The 2nd Law	2012	
"Falling Away with You"	Matt Bellamy; Chris Wolstenholme; Dominic Howard ‡	Absolution	2003	
"Falling Down"	Matt Bellamy	Showbiz	1999	
"Feeling Good" (Note: "Feeling Good" was originally recorded by Nina Simone.) †	Leslie Bricusse; Anthony Newley	Origin of Symmetry	2001	
"Fillip"	Matt Bellamy	Showbiz	1999	
"Follow Me" †	Matt Bellamy	The 2nd Law	2012	
"Forced In"	Matt Bellamy	"Uno"	1999	
"Fury"	Matt Bellamy; Chris Wolstenholme; Dominic Howard ‡	Absolution (Japanese edition)	2003	
"Futurism"	Matt Bellamy	"Dead Star / In Your World" (Note: "Futurism" was also featured as a bonus track on the Japanese edition of Origin of Symmetry.)	2002	
"The Gallery"	Matt Bellamy	"Bliss"	2001	
"Get Up and Fight"	Matt Bellamy; Johan Schuster	Simulation Theory	2018	
"Ghosts (How Can I Move On)"	Matt Bellamy	Will of the People	2022	
"The Globalist"	Matt Bellamy; Edward Elgar (Note: "The Globalist" contains elements of Variation IX (Adagio) "Nimrod", composed by Edward Elgar.)	Drones	2015	
"Glorious"	Matt Bellamy	"Invincible" (Note: "Glorious" was also featured as a bonus track on the Japanese edition of Black Holes and Revelations.)	2007	
"The Groove"	Matt Bellamy; Chris Wolstenholme; Dominic Howard ‡	"Time Is Running Out"	2003	
"Guiding Light"	Matt Bellamy	The Resistance	2009	
"The Handler"	Matt Bellamy	Drones	2015	
"Hate This and I'll Love You"	Matt Bellamy	Showbiz	1999	
"Hexagons" †	Matt Bellamy	The Wow! Signal	2026	
"Hoodoo"	Matt Bellamy	Black Holes and Revelations	2006	
"Host"	Matt Bellamy	"Cave"	1999	
"House of the Rising Sun"	Traditional, arranged by Alan Price (Note: Muse covers The Animals version of "House of the Rising Sun".)	1 Love	2002	
"Hush"	Matt Bellamy; Dan Lancaster; Nicholas Gale; Richard Boardman; Theo Hutchcraft	The Wow! Signal	2026	
"Hyper Chondriac Music"	Matt Bellamy	"Bliss"	2001	
"Hyper Music" †	Matt Bellamy	Origin of Symmetry	2001	
"Hysteria" (Note: "Hysteria" is also known as "Hysteria (I Want It Now)".) †	Matt Bellamy; Chris Wolstenholme; Dominic Howard ‡	Absolution	2003	
"I Belong to You (+Mon Cœur S'ouvre a ta Voix)"	Matt Bellamy; Camille Saint-Saëns (Note: "Mon Cœur S'ouvre à ta Voix" was composed by Camille Saint-Saëns.)	The Resistance	2009	
"In Your World" †	Matt Bellamy	Dead Star / In Your World	2002	
"Interlude"	Matt Bellamy; Chris Wolstenholme; Dominic Howard ‡	Absolution	2003	
"Intro"	Matt Bellamy; Chris Wolstenholme; Dominic Howard ‡	Absolution	2003	
"Invincible" †	Matt Bellamy	Black Holes and Revelations	2006	
"[JFK]"	Matt Bellamy	Drones	2015	
"Jimmy Kane"	Matt Bellamy	"Uno"	1999	
"Kill or Be Killed" †	Matt Bellamy	Will of the People	2022	
"Knights of Cydonia" †	Matt Bellamy	Black Holes and Revelations	2006	
"Liberation"	Matt Bellamy	Will of the People	2022	
"Liquid State"	Chris Wolstenholme	The 2nd Law	2012	
"Madness" †	Matt Bellamy	The 2nd Law	2012	
"Man of Mystery" (Note: "Man of Mystery" was originally recorded by The Shadows.)	Michael Carr	The Supermassive Selection	2007	
"Map of the Problematique" †	Matt Bellamy	Black Holes and Revelations	2006	
"Map of Your Head"	Matt Bellamy	"New Born"	2001	
"Megalomania"	Matt Bellamy	Origin of Symmetry	2001	
"Mercy" †	Matt Bellamy	Drones	2015	
"Micro Cuts"	Matt Bellamy	Origin of Symmetry	2001	
"Minimum"	Matt Bellamy	"Muscle Museum"	1999	
"MK Ultra"	Matt Bellamy	The Resistance	2009	
"Muscle Museum" †	Matt Bellamy	Showbiz	1999	
"Nature_1" (Note: "Nature_1" is also known as "Natural Disaster".)	Matt Bellamy	"Plug In Baby"	2001	
"Neutron Star Collision (Love Is Forever)" †	Matt Bellamy	The Twilight Saga: Eclipse	2010	
"New Born" †	Matt Bellamy	Origin of Symmetry	2001	
"Nightshift Superstar" †	Matt Bellamy; Dominic Howard; Chris Wolstenholme; Dan Lancaster ‡	The Wow! Signal	2026	
"Nishe"	Matt Bellamy	"Unintended"	2000	
"Overdue"	Matt Bellamy	Showbiz	1999	
"Panic Station" †	Matt Bellamy	The 2nd Law	2012	
"Piano Thing"	Matt Bellamy	"New Born"	2001	
"Pink Ego Box" (Note: "Pink Ego Box" is also known as "Instant Messenger".)	Matt Bellamy	"Muscle Museum"	1999	
"Please, Please, Please, Let Me Get What I Want" (Note: "Please, Please, Please Let Me Get What I Want" was originally recorded by The Smiths.)	Steven Morrissey; Johnny Marr	"Feeling Good / Hyper Music"	2001	
"Plug In Baby" †	Matt Bellamy	Origin of Symmetry	2001	
"Popcorn"	Gershon Kingsley	"Resistance"	2009	
"Prague"	Darren Brown	"Resistance"	2009	
"Prelude"	Matt Bellamy	The 2nd Law	2012	
"Pressure" †	Matt Bellamy	Simulation Theory	2018	
"Propaganda"	Matt Bellamy; Tim Mosley; Angel Lopez; Federico Vindver	Simulation Theory	2018	
"Psycho" †	Matt Bellamy	Drones	2015	
"Reapers" †	Matt Bellamy	Drones	2015	
"Recess"	Matt Bellamy	"Unintended"	2000	
"Resistance" †	Matt Bellamy	The Resistance	2009	
"Revolt" †	Matt Bellamy	Drones	2015	
"Ruled by Secrecy"	Matt Bellamy; Chris Wolstenholme; Dominic Howard ‡	Absolution	2003	
"Save Me"	Chris Wolstenholme	The 2nd Law	2012	
"Screenager"	Matt Bellamy	Origin of Symmetry	2001	
"Shimmering Scars"	Matt Bellamy; Dominic Howard; Chris Wolstenholme; Dan Lancaster ‡	The Wow! Signal	2026	
"Shine"	Matt Bellamy	"Hyper Music / Feeling Good"	2001	
"Shine Acoustic"	Matt Bellamy	Hullabaloo Soundtrack	2002	
"Showbiz"	Matt Bellamy	Showbiz	1999	
"Shrinking Universe"	Matt Bellamy	"New Born"	2001	
"The Sickness in You & I"	Matt Bellamy; Dominic Howard; Chris Wolstenholme; Dan Lancaster ‡	The Wow! Signal	2026	
"Sing for Absolution" †	Matt Bellamy; Chris Wolstenholme; Dominic Howard ‡	Absolution	2003	
"The Small Print"	Matt Bellamy; Chris Wolstenholme; Dominic Howard ‡	Absolution	2003	
"Sober"	Matt Bellamy	Showbiz	1999	
"Soldier's Poem"	Matt Bellamy	Black Holes and Revelations	2006	
"Something Human" †	Matt Bellamy	Simulation Theory	2018	
"Space Debris"	Matt Bellamy	The Wow! Signal	2026	
"Space Dementia"	Matt Bellamy	Origin of Symmetry	2001	
"Spiral Static"	Matt Bellamy	"Plug In Baby" (Note: "Spiral Static" was also featured as a bonus track on the Japanese edition of Showbiz.)	2001	
"Starlight" †	Matt Bellamy	Black Holes and Revelations	2006	
"Stockholm Syndrome" †	Matt Bellamy; Chris Wolstenholme; Dominic Howard ‡	Absolution	2003	
"Sunburn" †	Matt Bellamy	Showbiz	1999	
"Supermassive Black Hole" †	Matt Bellamy	Black Holes and Revelations	2006	
"Supremacy" †	Matt Bellamy	The 2nd Law	2012	
"Survival" †	Matt Bellamy	The 2nd Law	2012	
"Take a Bow"	Matt Bellamy	Black Holes and Revelations	2006	
"Thought Contagion" †	Matt Bellamy	Simulation Theory	2018	
"Thoughts of a Dying Atheist"	Matt Bellamy; Chris Wolstenholme; Dominic Howard ‡	Absolution	2003	
"Time Is Running Out" †	Matt Bellamy; Chris Wolstenholme; Dominic Howard ‡	Absolution	2003	
"Twin" (Note: "Twin" is also known as "Balloonatic".)	Matt Bellamy	"Cave"	1999	
"Undisclosed Desires" †	Matt Bellamy	The Resistance	2009	
"Unintended" †	Matt Bellamy	Showbiz	1999	
"United States of Eurasia (+Collateral Damage)"	Matt Bellamy; Frédéric Chopin (Note: "Collateral Damage" contains elements of Nocturne in E-flat major, Op. 9, No. 2, composed by Frédéric Chopin.)	The Resistance	2009	
"Unnatural Selection"	Matt Bellamy	The Resistance	2009	
"Uno" †	Matt Bellamy	Showbiz	1999	
"Unravelling" †	Matt Bellamy; Dan Lancaster	The Wow! Signal	2025	
"Uprising" †	Matt Bellamy	The Resistance	2009	
"Verona"	Matt Bellamy	Will of the People	2022	
"The Void"	Matt Bellamy	Simulation Theory	2018	
"We Are Fucking Fucked"	Matt Bellamy	Will of the People	2022	
"Who Knows Who" (Note: "Who Knows Who" is a collaboration with Mike Skinner.)	Matt Bellamy; Mike Skinner	"Uprising"	2009	
"Will of the People" †	Matt Bellamy	Will of the People	2022	
"Won't Stand Down" †	Matt Bellamy	Will of the People	2022	
"Yes Please"	Matt Bellamy	"Sunburn"	2000	
"You Make Me Feel Like It's Halloween" †	Matt Bellamy	Will of the People	2022	
