= Muscle Museum (EP) =

EP by Muse
- Released: 11 January 1999
- Recorded: 1998
- Studio: Sawmills (Fowey, England)
- Genre: Alternative rock
- Length: 20:41
- Label: Dangerous
- Producers: Muse; Paul Reeve

Muse chronology
Muse (1998)	Muscle Museum (1999)	Showbiz (1999)

Muscle Museum is the second EP by English rock band Muse. Recorded in 1998 at Sawmills Studios with producer Paul Reeve, it was released on 11 January 1999 by Dangerous Records, limited to 999 hand-numbered copies. The EP features six tracks, five of which were released again later – "Instant Messenger" (as "Pink Ego Box") was featured as the B-side to the band's third single "Muscle Museum", while four were re-recorded for the group's debut full-length album Showbiz.

== Recording and release ==
As with their self-titled debut EP, Muse recorded Muscle Museum at Dennis Smith's Sawmills Studios with producer Paul Reeve, with the sessions taking place in 1998. Reeve also performed additional backing vocals "Unintended" and "Instant Messenger". Muscle Museum was released in the same way as the Muse EP, on Smith's Dangerous Records limited to 999 numbered copies, on 11 January 1999. Some additional copies were pressed on CD-R not including the second version of "Muscle Museum", while media contacts were sent non-numbered copies. Journalist Mark Beaumont has described the EP's release as "low-key", calling it a "stop-gap" release.

== Reception and legacy ==
The Muscle Museum EP gained Muse national exposure, thanks in part to the NME who featured Muse following its release. The EP entered the NME Indie Singles Chart at number 3, behind major label acts Mercury Rev and Fatboy Slim. However, according to Muse: Inside the Muscle Museum author Ben Myers, early reviews of the release were not particularly positive: fanzine Robots and Electric Brains, for example, sarcastically likened the band's sound to that of Radiohead, with whom they were compared often. A number of tracks from the EP were played on Steve Lamacq's show on BBC Radio 1 a few weeks after its release. The EP was included as part of Muse's 2019 boxset, Origin of Muse, which covered Muse's early releases and their first two studio albums. As part of Record Store Day, the EP was rereleased on limited edition 12" vinyl on 18 April 2026.

== Track listing ==
All tracks are written by Matt Bellamy.

No.	Title	Length
1.	"Muscle Museum"	4:20
2.	"Sober"	4:02
3.	"Uno"	3:36
4.	"Unintended"	3:56
5.	"Instant Messenger"	3:31
6.	"(Muscle Museum)#2"	1:16

== Personnel ==
Muse

- Matt Bellamy – lead vocals, guitars, piano, Hammond organ, Mellotron, production
- Chris Wolstenholme – bass, backing vocals, production
- Dominic Howard – drums, production

Additional personnel

- Paul Reeve – production, engineering, mixing, backing vocals (tracks 4 and 5)
- Mark Thomas – engineering assistance
- John Cornfield – mastering
- Phil Andrews – photography
- Steve Conner – graphic design

== Charts ==
Chart performance for Muscle Museum
Chart (2026)	Peak position
Dutch Albums (Album Top 100)	92
Hungarian Physical Albums (MAHASZ)	13
Scottish Albums (Official Charts)	13
UK Albums (Official Charts)	84

== Bibliography ==
- Beaumont, Mark (2008), Out of This World: The Story of Muse, London, England: Omnibus Press (published 8 October 2008), ISBN 978-1847723772
- Myers, Ben (2007), Muse: Inside the Muscle Museum, New York City, New York: Random House (published 7 June 2007), ISBN 978-0955282256
