= Muse (EP) =

EP by Muse
- Released: 11 May 1998
- Recorded: 1997
- Studio: Sawmills (Fowey, England)
- Genre: Alternative rock
- Length: 16:02
- Label: Dangerous
- Producers: Muse; Paul Reeve

Muse chronology
Muse (1998)	Muscle Museum (1999)

Muse is the self-titled debut EP by English rock band Muse. Recorded in 1997 at Sawmills Studios with producer Paul Reeve, it was released on 11 May 1998 by Dangerous Records, limited to 999 hand-numbered copies. The EP features four tracks, all of which were released again later – "Coma" was featured as the B-side to the band's second single "Cave", while the other three were re-recorded for the group's debut full-length album Showbiz.

== Recording and production ==
The self-titled debut EP by Muse was recorded over a period of five days "in the autumn of 1997" at Sawmills Studios in Golant, Cornwall, with studio owner and Dangerous Records founder Dennis Smith agreeing to fund and arrange the sessions in return for payment if the band were later signed as a result of the release. Paul Reeve was tasked by Smith with leading production of the EP, partly due to the fact that senior engineer John Cornfield was currently working with Supergrass, and partly because Reeve and Muse frontman Matt Bellamy had "similar singing styles". The band recorded a total of ten songs during the sessions, later settling on "Overdue", "Cave", "Coma" and "Escape" for inclusion on the EP. "Cave" and "Coma" were also mixed by Reeve, while Cornfield mixed "Overdue" and "Escape".

== Promotion and release ==
Muse was released on Dennis Smith's own independent record label Dangerous Records on 11 May 1998. The retail version was limited to 999 hand-numbered copies, while an additional 251 non-numbered promotional copies were produced for distribution to media contacts. Smith commented about the release that "I wasn't interested in making money selling records. That release was a pure statement of intent to the music industry, a way of raising [Muse's] profile". It was sold in a number of local independent record shops in Devon (such as KMA in Torquay and Solo in Exeter), as well as made available by mail order. The EP's artwork was created by the band's drummer Dominic Howard, who arranged three photocopied sections of his face into a "wonky visage". For promotional purposes, another copy of the EP was pressed with the title Sawmills Promo, featuring the same track listing (except for "Escape", which featured its original title of "Escape Your Meaningless"). The EP was included as part of Muse's 2019 boxset, Origin of Muse, which covered Muse's early releases and their first two studio albums. As part of Record Store Day, the EP was rereleased on limited edition 12" vinyl on 18 April 2026.

== Reception and legacy ==
According to journalist Mark Beaumont, the Muse EP "sold slowly at first, creeping out of shops as word gradually spread" of the band; Muse: Inside the Muscle Museum author Ben Myers commented that it was met with "relative indifference". Writing in Out of This World: The Story of Muse, Beaumont claimed that "While the vitality and verve of 'The Muse EP' was enough to win over the casual listener, in retrospect it sounds like a band awkwardly finding their way around the recording studio and its techniques". Beaumont also criticised Bellamy's lyrical content on the release, describing "Overdue" as "crude" and "Escape" as "rambling". Upon the EP's release, Exeter's tdb magazine reported that the songs on Muse were "nothing short of awesome and unlike anything you've ever heard from a Westcountry band".

== Track listing ==
All tracks are written by Matt Bellamy

No.	Title	Length
1.	"Overdue"	4:09
2.	"Cave"	4:44
3.	"Coma"	3:34
4.	"Escape"	3:20

== Personnel ==
Personnel adapted from Muse liner notes

Muse

- Matt Bellamy – lead vocals, guitar, piano, production
- Chris Wolstenholme – bass, backing vocals, production
- Dominic Howard – drums, production, artwork

Additional personnel

- Paul Reeve – production, engineering, mixing (tracks 2 and 3)
- John Cornfield – mixing (tracks 1 and 4)
- Chris Davison – photography

== Charts ==
Chart performance for Muse
Chart (2026)	Peak position
Hungarian Physical Albums (MAHASZ)	14

== Bibliography ==
- Beaumont, Mark (2008), Out of This World: The Story of Muse, London, England: Omnibus Press (published 8 October 2008), ISBN 978-1847723772
- Myers, Ben (2007), Muse: Inside the Muscle Museum, New York City, New York: Random House (published 7 June 2007), ISBN 978-0955282256
