= Black Holes and Revelations Tour =

2006–08 concert tour by Muse

- Promotional tour by Muse
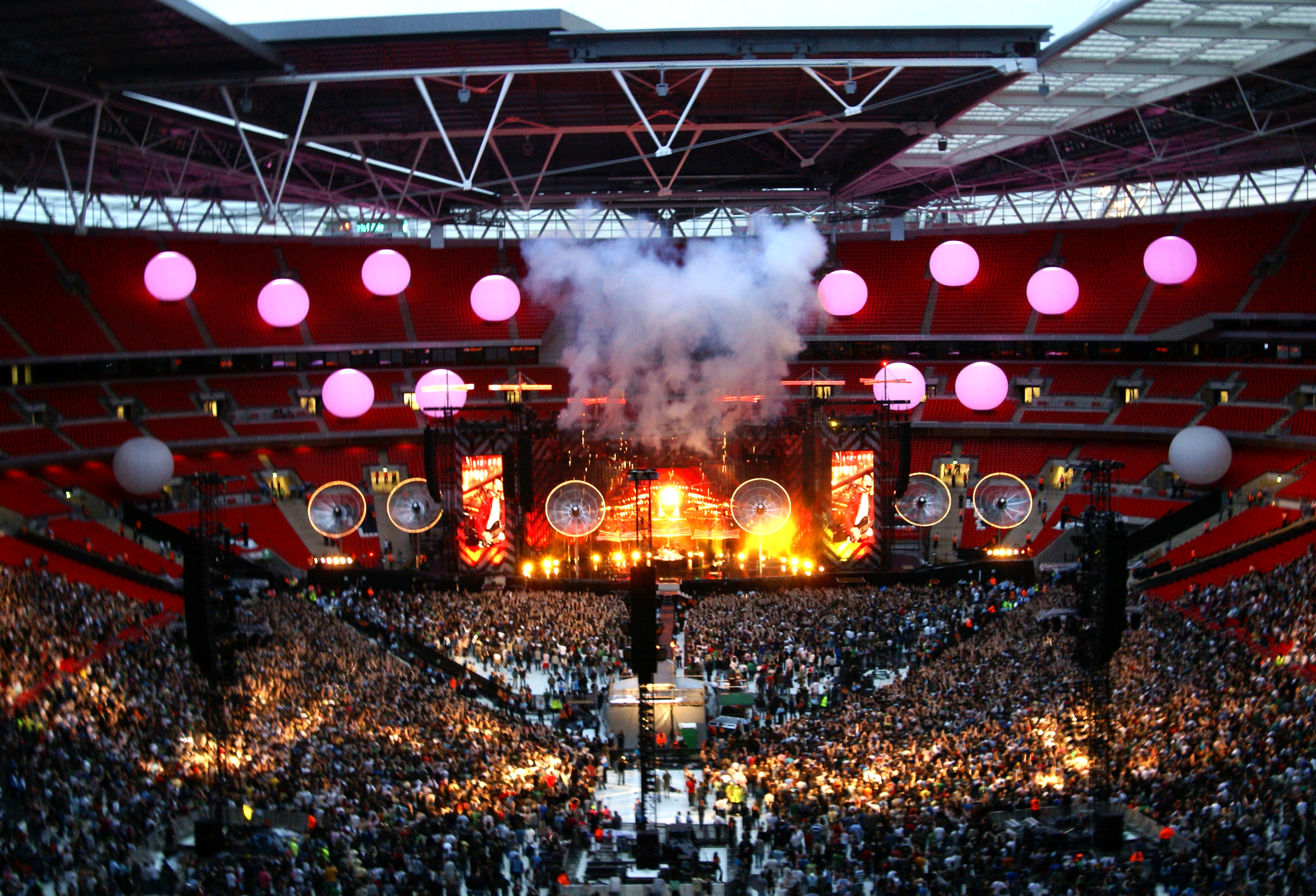
- Location: Europe; North America; Asia; Australasia; South America; South Africa
- Associated album: Black Holes and Revelations
- Start date: 13 May 2006
- End date: 17 August 2008
- Legs: 14
- No. of shows: 195

Muse concert chronology
- US Campus Invasion Tour 2005 (2005); Black Holes and Revelations Tour (2006–08); A Seaside Rendezvous (2009)

The Black Holes and Revelations Tour was a worldwide concert tour by English rock band Muse in support of their fourth studio album Black Holes and Revelations. Lasting at over 2 years, this was the band's longest tour to date.

== Overview ==
In July 2006 the band announced that they would be going on their "biggest ever tour" in support of the album.

The tour opened with a slot at Radio 1's Big Weekend in Dundee, Scotland, Muse's first concert since the Live 8 concerts in July 2005. During the summer of 2006 the band played their first series of shows, including a headline appearance at the Leeds and Reading Carling Weekend festivals. Following that was a tour that visited most of the world's major continents. The tour saw them travelling over most of the world, including countries such as the UK, most of Europe, the US, Canada, Australia, Japan, China and Korea. This tour also included the band's maiden visits to South-East Asian countries such as Malaysia and Indonesia, and Latin and South America.

The band's shows throughout the Black Holes and Revelations Tour became noted for their increasing usage of special effects. For their Carling Weekend shows the band used a display with neon tubes that had 10 smaller video screens in front, with 5 on the ground and 5 moving behind them. Smaller versions were used for other concerts on the 2006 European Festival circuit, plus on the first two US legs, the first Australian tour and the band's South-East Asian tour.

For the band's main European autumn/winter arena tour, Muse were originally intending to use the same set but changed their set design to a design based upon the H.A.A.R.P. installation in Alaska. The new design included a pod-style drum-riser over the top of drummer Dom Howard's drum kit on stage right while above the stage a pair of pylons carrying light-up tubes occupied the roof space and a giant video screen occupied the back wall. Originally the band wished for the pylon to extend into the audience but lack of money meant this wasn't possible. This show was modified for the 2007 European festival circuit with the drum-riser and kit moved into centre-stage and a new video screen above the riser, with 4 video 'strips' on stage with 2 either side of the drums. The riser was removed from this production at the end of the European festival shows.

Between the European arena and festival/stadium tours, the band embarked on a tour to Australia and the Far East. The band were 2nd on the bill at the 2007 Big Day Out Festival, behind headliners Tool. The band also played sideshows in Sydney and Melbourne before embarking on concerts in South East Asia, Muse's debut concerts. The South East Asia tour led to the band's biggest tour of Japan and a debut Muse show in South Korea. The band then moved to America, playing their biggest North American headline concerts at the time at the Inglewood Forum and the Palacio de los Deportes arena in Mexico City.

The biggest concert of the tour was the two nights that they played in the new Wembley Stadium on 16 and 17 June 2007. They were the first band to play at and sell out the newly rebuilt stadium. The show incorporated much more extensive special effects than other concerts, which included huge satellite dishes, "futuristic" antennas, giant white balls and thousands of lights. The encore featured two acrobats that floated high above the crowd suspended on floating white balloons during the performance of "Blackout", an album track from previous record Absolution. Footage of the latter concert was released on DVD whilst a live CD album contained a selection of recorded tracks from the two nights. Both discs were released as a joint package under the title HAARP.

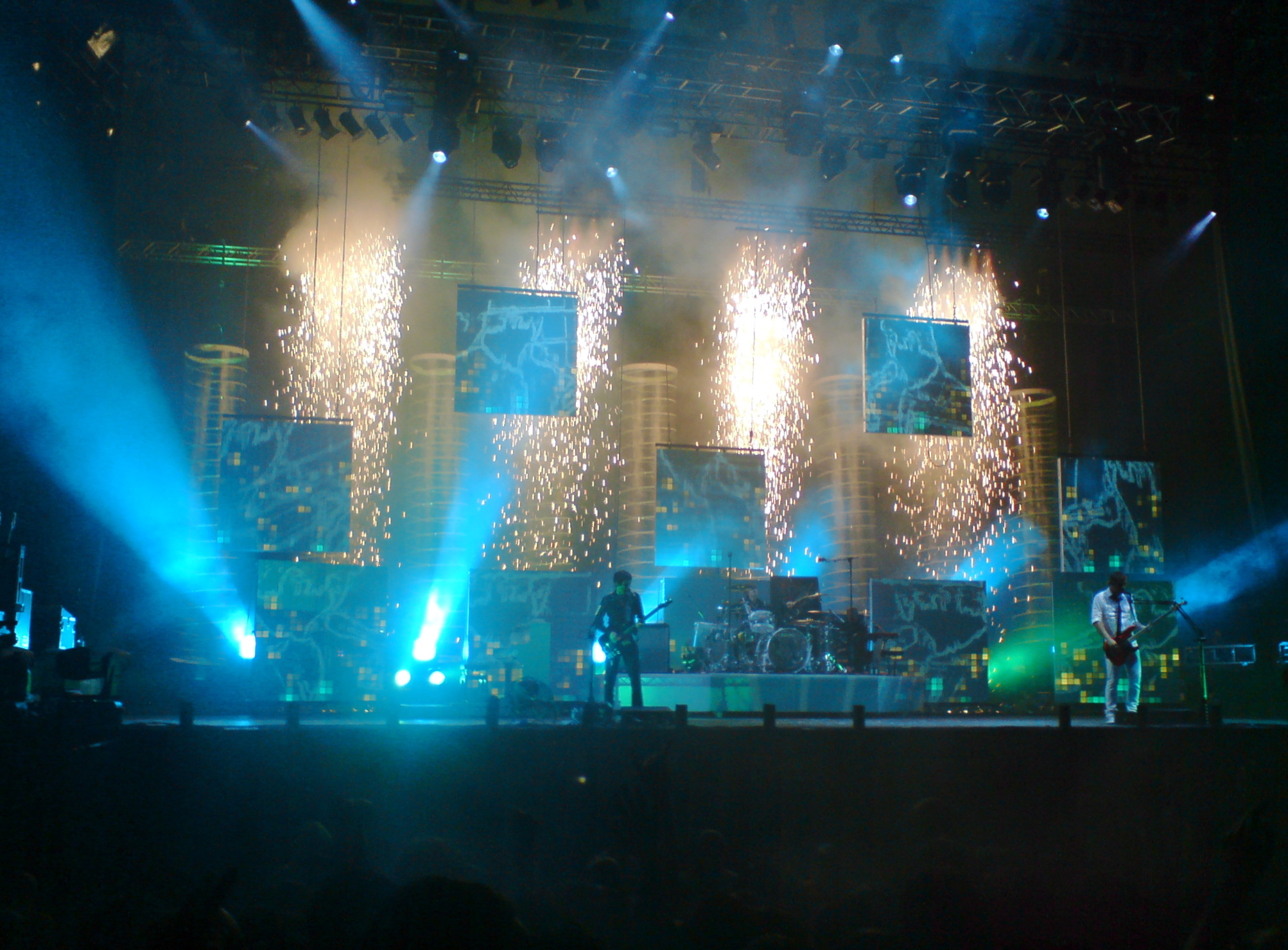
Muse playing Starlight at Leeds Festival 2006

After Wembley the tour continued with Muse playing many gigs on the European festival circuits including headline appearances at Rock Werchter and the Benicàssim Festival. The tour then progressed to Muse's biggest North American tour at that point, including appearances at New York City's Madison Square Garden, Morrison's Red Rocks Amphitheatre and a headline appearance at Lollapalooza 2007.

Following that the band then did a tour of Eastern Europe in October before heading for an arena tour of Australia in November, finally ending 2007 at the KROQ Almost Acoustic Christmas. The following year saw Muse have a much more relaxed schedule, but still saw Muse make play their first ever gigs in Dubai and South Africa at festivals, before making their gig debuts in South America on a 3-week arena tour.

In April 2008, the band also played a show for the Teenage Cancer Trust at London's Royal Albert Hall, which saw the band perform a much more stripped down show than usual but was also said by the band to be one of their favourite gigs of the tour. The band also performed "Megalomania", the final song from 2nd album Origin of Symmetry, for the first time since 2002, with Matt Bellamy playing the Albert Hall's famous organ.

The tour finished on 17 August 2008 when the band performed a headline slot at the Stafford leg of the British V Festival. For this show plus V's sister show in Chelmsford and a show a few days earlier at Marlay Park in Dublin, the band converted their Wembley satellite dishes into multiple video screens and also used a huge extensive light show.

== Personnel ==
- Matt Bellamy – lead vocals, guitar, piano
- Chris Wolstenholme – bass, backing vocals, harmonica, guitar on "Hoodoo"
- Dominic Howard – drums, backing vocals on "Supermassive Black Hole"
- Morgan Nicholls – keyboards, synthesizers, backing vocals, percussion, bass on "Hoodoo"

== Tour dates ==
Date	City	Country	Venue	Support
First leg: Festivals + warm-up shows I
13 May 2006	Dundee	United Kingdom	Radio 1's Big Weekend	Various
7 June 2006	Milan	Italy	Milan's Rolling Stone	None
24 June 2006	Neuhausen ob Eck	Germany	Southside Festival	Various
28 June 2006	London	United Kingdom	Shepherd's Bush Empire	None
30 June 2006	Werchter	Belgium	Rock Werchter	Various
1 July 2006	Arras	France	Main Square Festival	Various
2 July 2006	Belfort	France	Eurockéennes	Various
8 July 2006	Kristiansand	Norway	Quart Festival	Various
Second leg: North America I
18 July 2006	San Francisco	United States	Music Concourse	The Cloud Room
19 July 2006	Los Angeles	United States	Greek Theatre	The Cloud Room
21 July 2006	San Diego	United States	Soma San Diego	The Cloud Room
22 July 2006	Phoenix	United States	Celebrity Theatre	The Cloud Room
24 July 2006	Denver	United States	Fillmore Auditorium	The Cloud Room
26 July 2006	Minneapolis	United States	State Theatre	The Cloud Room
27 July 2006	Chicago	United States	Aragon Ballroom	The Cloud Room
28 July 2006	Detroit	United States	The Fillmore Detroit	The Cloud Room
30 July 2006	Toronto	Canada	The Docks Concert Theatre	The Cloud Room
31 July 2006	Montreal	Canada	Jacques Cartier Pier	The Cloud Room
2 August 2006	Boston	United States	Bank of America Pavilion	The Cloud Room
3 August 2006	New York City	United States	Hammerstein Ballroom	The Cloud Room
4 August 2006	Philadelphia	United States	Electric Factory	The Cloud Room
6 August 2006	Atlanta	United States	The Tabernacle	The Cloud Room
Third leg: Festivals and warm-up shows II
East Asia
12 August 2006	Osaka	Japan	Summer Sonic Festival	Various
13 August 2006	Chiba	Japan	Summer Sonic Festival	Various
Europe
17 August 2006	Salzburg	Austria	Frequency Festival	Various
18 August 2006	Gampel	Switzerland	Gampel Open Air Festival	Various
20 August 2006	Biddinghuizen	Netherlands	Lowlands Festival	Various
22 August 2006	St Austell	United Kingdom	Eden Project	Hey Molly, Nixon and the Burn
24 August 2006	Edinburgh	United Kingdom	Meadowbank Stadium	My Chemical Romance
26 August 2006	Reading	United Kingdom	The Carling Weekend	Various
27 August 2006	Leeds	United Kingdom	The Carling Weekend	Various
2 September 2006	Istanbul	Turkey	Rock'n Coke	Various
Fourth leg: North America II
9 September 2006	Toronto	Canada	Virgin Festival	Various
10 September 2006	Cleveland	United States	Agora Theatre	The Like
11 September 2006	Columbus	United States	Lifestyle Communities Pavilion	The Like
13 September 2006	Nashville	United States	War Memorial Auditorium	The Like
14 September 2006	St. Louis	United States	The Pageant	The Like
15 September 2006	Kansas City	United States	Uptown Theatre	The Like
17 September 2006	Austin	United States	Austin City Limits Music Festival	Various
18 September 2006	Houston	United States	Verizon Wireless Theater	The Like
19 September 2006	Grand Prairie	United States	Nokia Theater	The Like
21 September 2006	Paradise	United States	The Joint	The Like
23 September 2006	Devore	United States	Inland Invasion	Various
24 September 2006	Tucson	United States	KFMA Fall Ball Music Festival	Various
26 September 2006	Salt Lake City	United States	Saltair Pavilion	The Like
28 September 2006	Davis	United States	ARC Pavilion	The Like
30 September 2006	Mountain View	United States	Download Festival	Various
3 October 2006	Portland	United States	Roseland Theater	The Like
4 October 2006	Seattle	United States	Paramount Theatre	The Like
Fifth Leg: Europe I
24 October 2006	Bilbao	Spain	Bizkaia Arena	Poet in Process
26 October 2006	Lisbon	Portugal	Campo Pequeno	Poet in Process
27 October 2006	Madrid	Spain	Palacio de Deportes	Poet in Process
28 October 2006	Barcelona	Spain	Palau Municipal d'Esports de Badalona	Poet in Process
30 October 2006	Toulouse	France	Le Zénith	Poet in Process
27 October 2006	Bordeaux	France	Patinoire Mériadeck	Poet in Process
3 November 2006	Dublin	Ireland	Point Theatre	Noisettes
4 November 2006	Belfast	United Kingdom	Odyssey Arena	Noisettes
6 November 2006	Aberdeen	United Kingdom	AECC	Noisettes
7 November 2006	Glasgow	United Kingdom	SECC	Noisettes
10 November 2006	Manchester	United Kingdom	Evening News Arena	Noisettes
11 November 2006	Manchester	United Kingdom	Evening News Arena	Noisettes
12 November 2006	Cardiff	United Kingdom	Cardiff International Arena	Noisettes
14 November 2006	Birmingham	United Kingdom	National Exhibition Centre	Noisettes
15 November 2006	Birmingham	United Kingdom	National Exhibition Centre	Noisettes
17 November 2006	Nottingham	United Kingdom	National Ice Centre	Noisettes
18 November 2006	Sheffield	United Kingdom	Hallam FM Arena	Noisettes
19 November 2006	Newcastle	United Kingdom	Metro Radio Arena	Noisettes
21 November 2006	London	United Kingdom	Wembley Arena	Noisettes
22 November 2006	London	United Kingdom	Wembley Arena	Noisettes
23 November 2006	London	United Kingdom	Wembley Arena	Noisettes
25 November 2006	Berlin	Germany	Treptow Arena	The Noisettes
26 November 2006	Hamburg	Germany	Alsterdorfer Sporthalle	The Noisettes
28 November 2006	's-Hertogenbosch	Netherlands	Brabanthallen	The Noisettes
29 November 2006	Böblingen	Germany	Sporthalle	The Noisettes
1 December 2006	Rome	Italy	PalaLottomatica	The Noisettes
2 December 2006	Bologna	Italy	PalaMalaguti	The Noisettes
4 December 2006	Milan	Italy	DatchForum	The Noisettes
5 December 2006	Geneva	Switzerland	SEG Geneva Arena	The Noisettes
6 December 2006	Winterthur	Switzerland	Eishalle Deutweg	The Noisettes
8 December 2006	Vienna	Austria	Wiener Stadthalle	The Noisettes
9 December 2006	Munich	Germany	Zenith	The Noisettes
11 December 2006	Lyon	France	Halle Tony Garnier	The Noisettes
13 December 2006	Düsseldorf	Germany	Philipshalle	The Noisettes
14 December 2006	Paris	France	Palais Omnisports de Paris-Bercy	Razorlight
15 December 2006	Paris	France	Palais Omnisports de Paris-Bercy	Razorlight
17 December 2006	Nantes	France	Le Zénith	Razorlight
18 December 2006	Lille	France	Zenith de Lille	Razorlight
19 December 2006	Antwerp	Belgium	Sportpaleis	Razorlight
Sixth leg: Asia/ Australasia
16 January 2007	Singapore	Singapore	Fort Canning Park	None
19 January 2007	Auckland	New Zealand	Big Day Out	Various
21 January 2007	Gold Coast	Australia	Big Day Out	Various
23 January 2007	Sydney	Australia	Hordern Pavilion	Ground Components
24 January 2007	Sydney	Australia	Hordern Pavilion	Ground Components
25 January 2007	Sydney	Australia	Big Day Out	Various
28 January 2007	Melbourne	Australia	Big Day Out	Various
30 January 2007	Melbourne	Australia	Festival Hall	Ground Components
31 January 2007	Melbourne	Australia	Festival Hall	Ground Components
2 February 2007	Adelaide	Australia	Big Day Out	Various
4 February 2007	Perth	Australia	Big Day Out	Various
23 February 2007	Jakarta	Indonesia	Istora Senayan	None
25 February 2007	Kuala Lumpur	Malaysia	Stadium Negara	None
28 February 2007	Taipei	Taiwan	Spirit of Taiwan	Various
3 March 2007	Hong Kong	Hong Kong	AsiaWorld–Expo	None
7 March 2007	Seoul	South Korea	Jamsil Arena	None
10 March 2007	Tokyo	Japan	Shinkiba Studio Coast	None
11 March 2007	Tokyo	Japan	Shinkiba Studio Coast	None
12 March 2007	Tokyo	Japan	Tokyo International Forum	None
14 March 2007	Osaka	Japan	Zepp	None
15 March 2007	Osaka	Japan	Zepp	None
16 March 2007	Fukuoka	Japan	Zepp	None
18 March 2007	Sendai	Japan	Zepp	None
19 March 2007	Nagoya	Japan	Zepp	None
Seventh leg: North America III
9 April 2007	San Francisco	United States	Bill Graham Civic Auditorium	Immigrant
10 April 2007	Inglewood	United States	The Forum	Immigrant
12 April 2007	Mexico City	Mexico	Palacio de los Deportes	None
15 April 2007	Frisco	United States	Edgefest	Various
5 May 2007	East Rutherford	United States	The Bamboozle	Various
Eighth leg: Europe II
Europe
26 May 2007	Esch-sur-Alzette	Luxembourg	Rockhal	Montevideo
27 May 2007	Landgraaf	Netherlands	Pinkpop Festival	Various
30 May 2007	Florence	Italy	Piazzale Michelangelo	Juliette and the Licks
1 June 2007	Nürburg	Germany	Rock am Ring	Various
2 June 2007	Nuremberg	Germany	Rock im Park	Various
9 June 2007	Newport	United Kingdom	Isle of Wight Festival	Various
16 June 2007	London	United Kingdom	Wembley Stadium	The Streets, Dirty Pretty Things, Rodrigo y Gabriela
17 June 2007	London	United Kingdom	Wembley Stadium	My Chemical Romance, Biffy Clyro, Shy Child
23 June 2007	Paris	France	Parc des Princes	Biffy Clyro, We Are Scientists, Archive
28 June 2007	Werchter	Belgium	Rock Werchter	Various
30 June 2007	Gdynia	Poland	Open'er Festival	Various
2 July 2007	Riga	Latvia	Arena Riga	None
7 July 2007	Punchestown	Republic of Ireland	Oxegen	Various
8 July 2007	Roskilde	Denmark	Roskilde Festival	Various
7 July 2007	Monaco	Monaco	Stade Louis II	Kaiser Chiefs, Second Sex
13 July 2007	Aix-les-Bains	France	Musilac Festival	Various
14 July 2007	Locarno	Switzerland	Moon and Stars Festival	Various
16 July 2007	Verona	Italy	Verona Arena	None
18 July 2007	Nîmes	France	Arena of Nîmes	None
20 July 2007	Angoulême	France	Festival Garden Nef Party	Various
23 July 2007	Benicàssim	Spain	Festival Internacional de Benicàssim	Various
23 July 2007	Nyon	Switzerland	Paléo Festival	Various
East Asia
27 July 2007	Naeba Ski Resort	Japan	Fuji Rock Festival	Various
29 July 2007	Incheon	South Korea	Pentaport Rock Festival	Various
Ninth leg: North America IV
1 August 2007	Mississauga	Canada	Arrow Hall	Cold War Kids
2 August 2007	Sterling Heights	United States	CIMX-FM Annual Birthday Bash	Various
4 August 2007	Chicago	United States	Lollapalooza	Various
6 August 2007	New York City	United States	Madison Square Garden	Cold War Kids
9 August 2007	Fairfax	United States	Patriot Center	Cold War Kids
10 August 2007	Philadelphia	United States	Philadelphia Festival Pier	Cold War Kids
11 August 2007	Boston	United States	Agganis Arena	Cold War Kids
9 September 2007	Seattle	United States	KeyArena	Juliette and the Licks
10 September 2007	Portland	United States	Rose Garden	Juliette and the Licks
11 September 2007	Orem	United States	David O. McKay Events Center	Juliette and the Licks
15 September 2007	Austin	United States	Austin City Limits Music Festival	Various
16 September 2007	Grand Prairie	United States	Nokia Theater	Juliette and the Licks, Immigrant
18 September 2007	Morrison	United States	Red Rocks Amphitheatre	Juliette and the Licks, Immigrant
20 September 2007	Mesa	United States	Mesa Amphitheatre	Juliette and the Licks, Immigrant
21 September 2007	Irvine	United States	Verizon Wireless Amphitheatre	Juliette and the Licks, Immigrant
22 September 2007	Chula Vista	United States	Street Scene	Various
Tenth leg: Europe III
4 October 2007	Athens	Greece	Terra Vibe Park	None
6 October 2007	Bucharest	Romania	Stadionul Arcul de Triumf	Brett Anderson
7 October 2007	Belgrade	Serbia	Belgrade Arena	None
9 October 2007	Zagreb	Croatia	Dražen Petrović Basketball Hall	None
10 October 2007	Budapest	Hungary	László Papp Budapest Sports Arena	30Y
13 October 2007	Kyiv	Ukraine	Palace of Sports	None
15 October 2007	Moscow	Russia	Luzhniki Palace of Sports	None
17 October 2007	Helsinki	Finland	Helsinki Ice Hall	Manboy
19 October 2007	Saint Petersburg	Russia	Ice Palace	None
20 October 2007	Trondheim	Norway	Dødens Dal	Inglow
21 October 2007	Stockholm	Sweden	Hovet	Stalingrad Cowgirls
23 October 2007	Oslo	Norway	Oslo Spektrum	Stalingrad Cowgirls
24 October 2007	Copenhagen	Denmark	Forum Copenhagen	Dúné
Eleventh leg: North America
28 October 2007	Las Vegas	United States	Vegoose	Various
Twelfth leg: Australasia
10 November 2007	Perth	Australia	Supreme Court Gardens	The Checks
14 November 2007	Adelaide	Australia	Adelaide Entertainment Centre	The Checks
15 November 2007	Melbourne	Australia	Rod Laver Arena	The Checks
17 November 2007	Sydney	Australia	Sydney Entertainment Centre	The Checks
21 November 2007	Brisbane	Australia	Riverstage	The Checks
23 November 2007	Auckland	New Zealand	Trusts Stadium	The Checks
25 November 2007	Christchurch	New Zealand	Westpac Arena	The Checks
Thirteenth leg: KROQ Almost Acoustic Christmas
9 December 2007	Los Angeles	United States	Gibson Amphitheatre	Various
Fourteenth leg: Festivals + Charity event
3 March 2008	Dubai	United Arab Emirates	Dubai Desert Rock Festival	Various
21 March 2008	Johannesburg	South Africa	My Coke Fest	Various
24 March 2008	Cape Town	South Africa	My Coke Fest	Various
12 April 2008^{[A]}	London	United Kingdom	Royal Albert Hall	The Futureheads
6 June 2008	Lisbon	Portugal	Rock in Rio	Various
Fifteenth leg: Latin America
16 July 2008	Monterrey	Mexico	Monterrey Arena	Sexy Marvin
18 July 2008	Zapopan	Mexico	Telmex Auditorium	None
20 July 2008	Bogotá	Colombia	Palacio de los Deportes	The Hall Effect
23 July 2008	Buenos Aires	Argentina	Teatro Gran Rex	None
24 July 2008	Buenos Aires	Argentina	Teatro Gran Rex	None
26 July 2008	Santiago	Chile	Teatro Caupolicán	None
30 July 2008	Rio de Janeiro	Brazil	Vivo Rio	None
31 July 2008	São Paulo	Brazil	HSBC Brasil	None
2 August 2008	Brasília	Brazil	Porão do Rock	Various
Sixteenth leg:UK/ Ireland
13 August 2008	Dublin	Republic of Ireland	Marlay Park	Kasabian, Glasvegas
16 August 2008	Chelmsford	United Kingdom	V Festival	Various
17 August 2008	Weston-under-Lizard	United Kingdom	V Festival	Various

Festivals and other miscellaneous performances

^{A} This concert was a part of "Teenage Cancer Trust 2008"

=== Support shows ===
Muse performed slots for Depeche Mode in Sweden and My Chemical Romance in the United States. Muse were also due to support My Chemical Romance for another seven dates in the United States, however due to the illness of both bands as they had been struck down with food poisoning, these gigs were canceled.

Date	City	Country	Venue
Touring the Angel
7 July 2006	Stockholm	Sweden	Olympic Stadium
The Black Parade World Tour
14 April 2007	Houston	United States	Reliant Arena
16 April 2007	San Antonio	United States	AT&T Center
18 April 2007	Pensacola	United States	Civic Center
19 April 2007	Tampa	United States	St. Pete Times Forum
22 April 2007	Fort Lauderdale	United States	BankAtlantic Center
24 April 2007	Duluth	United States	Gwinnett Arena
25 April 2007	Nashville	United States	Municipal Auditorium
26 April 2007	Charlotte	United States	Cricket Arena
27 April 2007	Columbia	United States	Merriweather Post Pavilion
28 April 2007	Williamsburg	United States	The College of William and Mary

Below is a list of songs played on the Black Holes and Revelations tour:

Album	Song	Times
Showbiz (1999)	"Sunburn"	82
Showbiz (1999)	"Muscle Museum"	19
Showbiz (1999)	"Showbiz"	11
Showbiz (1999)	"Unintended"	15
Unintended (2000)	"Nishe"	1
Origin of Symmetry (2001)	"New Born"	191
Origin of Symmetry (2001)	"Bliss"	100
Origin of Symmetry (2001)	"Space Dementia"	6
Origin of Symmetry (2001)	"Plug in Baby"	196
Origin of Symmetry (2001)	"Citizen Erased"	44
Origin of Symmetry (2001)	"Micro Cuts"	12
Origin of Symmetry (2001)	"Feeling Good"	128
Origin of Symmetry (2001)	"Megalomania"	1
Hullabaloo Soundtrack (2002)	"Forced In"	71
Hullabaloo Soundtrack (2002)	"Dead Star"	10
Absolution (2003)	"Apocalypse Please"	64
Absolution (2003)	"Time is Running Out"	207
Absolution (2003)	"Sing for Absolution"	19
Absolution (2003)	"Stockholm Syndrome"	208
Absolution (2003)	"Hysteria"	204
Absolution (2003)	"Blackout"	4
Absolution (2003)	"Butterflies & Hurricanes"	176
Absolution (2003)	"Fury"	11
Absolution (2003)	"Ruled by Secrecy"	6
Absolution Tour (2005)	"The Groove"	6
Black Holes and Revelations (2006)	"Take a Bow"	176
Black Holes and Revelations (2006)	"Starlight"	208
Black Holes and Revelations (2006)	"Supermassive Black Hole"	204
Black Holes and Revelations (2006)	"Map of the Problematique"	202
Black Holes and Revelations (2006)	"Soldier's Poem"	96
Black Holes and Revelations (2006)	"Invincible"	169
Black Holes and Revelations (2006)	"Assassin"	54
Black Holes and Revelations (2006)	"Exo-Politics"	7
Black Holes and Revelations (2006)	"City of Delusion"	51
Black Holes and Revelations (2006)	"Hoodoo"	63
Black Holes and Revelations (2006)	"Knights of Cydonia"	209
