= Absolution Tour =

Video by Muse
- Released: 12 December 2005
- Recorded: 27 June 2004
- Venue: Glastonbury Festival (Pilton, Somerset)
- Genre: Alternative rock, new prog, space rock, progressive metal
- Length: 85:10
- Label: Warner
- Producer: Thomas Kirk

Muse chronology
Hullabaloo: Live at Le Zenith, Paris (2002)	Absolution Tour (2005)	HAARP (2008)

Absolution Tour is the second live video album by English rock band Muse. Released on 12 December 2005, the DVD release documents the band's headlining performance at the 2004 Glastonbury Festival. It also features additional live performances of other Muse songs from the tour as bonus features.

== Track listing ==
Glastonbury Festival 2004

1. "Hysteria" – 4:12
2. "New Born" – 6:29
3. "Sing for Absolution" – 4:55
4. "Muscle Museum" – 5:06
5. "Apocalypse Please" – 4:42
6. "Ruled by Secrecy" – 4:57
7. "Sunburn" – 5:32
8. "Butterflies and Hurricanes" – 6:11
9. "Bliss" – 3:53
10. "Time Is Running Out" – 4:02
11. "Plug In Baby" – 5:02
12. "Blackout" – 4:24

Extra features

1. "Fury" (Live at Wiltern Theatre - Los Angeles - 2004) – 4:58
2. "The Small Print" (Live at Earls Court - London - 2004) – 3:40
3. "Stockholm Syndrome" (Live at Earls Court - London - 2004) – 7:15
4. "The Groove in the States" (Live at Top Cats - Cincinnati - 2004) – 9:52
5. "Thoughts of a Dying Atheist" (Live at Wembley Arena - London - 2003) – 3:15
6. "Endlessly" (Live at Wembley Arena - London - 2003) – 4:01

Notes

- "Citizen Erased" and "Stockholm Syndrome" were performed during the bands gig at Glastonbury 2004, but both were omitted from this release.
- "Thoughts of a Dying Atheist" and "Endlessly" are hidden extras, requiring the viewer to select the "X" option on the extras menu.
- The DVD was dedicated to William Howard, Dominic Howard's father who died shortly after the band's performance at Glastonbury.

== Personnel ==
- Matt Bellamy – lead vocals, guitar, piano
- Chris Wolstenholme – bass, backing vocals, keyboards on "Blackout"
- Dominic Howard – drums, percussion

== Sales and certifications ==
Region	Certification	Certified units/sales
Australia (ARIA)	Gold	7,500^{^}
United Kingdom (BPI)	Platinum	50,000^{^}
^{^} Shipments figures based on certification alone.
