= Sunburn (Muse song) =

- 'CD1' cover

Single by Muse

from the album Showbiz
- B-side: "Ashamed" (CD1); "Yes Please" (CD2)
- Released: 21 February 2000
- Recorded: April 1999
- Studio: Sawmills Studio, Cornwall, England
- Genre: Alternative rock
- Length: 3:54 (album version); 3:33 (radio edit)
- Label: Taste/Mushroom
- Songwriter: Matt Bellamy
- Producer: John Leckie

Muse singles chronology
"Muscle Museum" (1999)	"Sunburn" (2000)	"Unintended" (2000)

Music video
- "Sunburn" by Muse on YouTube

"Sunburn" is a song by English rock band Muse. It is the opening track on their debut album Showbiz (1999), and was released as the fourth single on 21 February 2000.

== Background and composition ==
Both "Sunburn" and "Falling Down" were the last songs written for Showbiz, being in late 1998 while the others were between 1996 and early 1998.

The lyrics, as Matt Bellamy said, are about:

It's about like a moth flying to the light bulb, it's like that but a spaceman going towards the sun wanting to get away from the Earth because it had nothing.

== Release ==
"Sunburn" was released on 21 February 2000 on 7" vinyl—backed with a live acoustic version of the song—and double CD—backed with "Ashamed", a live version of the song, "Yes Please" and a live version of "Uno". It reached number 22 in the UK Singles Chart, making it their first song to enter the Top 40.

== Music video ==
The music video for "Sunburn", directed by Nick Gordon, depicts a young Brooke Kinsella—who later rose to fame as an actress on EastEnders—babysitting a young boy (Liam Hess) until she heads upstairs to investigate something. Entering a bedroom, she enters a wardrobe for a few minutes and begins to steal jewelry before Matt Bellamy and Chris Wolstenholme appear playing in the mirrors on the doors either side of her. Before she can see them, they quickly disappear in reality. Standing in front of a giant mirror, she's shocked when Bellamy, Wolstenholme and Dominic Howard emerge, playing only as their reflections. The young woman struggles to cope with seeing them perform in the mirror, clasping her head in frustration and throws an object at the mirror, smashing it. The young boy enters, he sees the room in a mess and then looks behind him. In the mirror, Muse have strangely vanished, and in their place is the girl. The video ends in a still of the boy staring in disbelief at the empty sofa, while in the mirror the girl is sitting on it.

== Live performances ==
"Sunburn" was one of Muse's most performed songs live, and was a permanent fixture in the band's concerts from 1999 to 2004. While not a staple, "Sunburn" was performed often on the Black Holes and Revelations Tour, and made occasional appearances on The Resistance Tour, The 2nd Law Tour, and Drones World Tour. The song has not been performed since 2016.

== Track listing ==
All tracks are written by Matt Bellamy.

7"
No.	Title	Length
1.	"Sunburn"	3:54
2.	"Sunburn" (live acoustic version)	4:15
Total length:		9:50

'CD1'
No.	Title	Length
1.	"Sunburn"	3:54
2.	"Ashamed"	3:47
3.	"Sunburn" (live)	3:49
Total length:		11:30

'CD2'
No.	Title	Length
1.	"Sunburn"	3:54
2.	"Yes Please"	3:06
3.	"Uno" (live)	3:49
Total length:		10:49

== Personnel ==
Personnel adapted from Showbiz liner notes

Muse

- Matt Bellamy - vocals, guitar, piano
- Chris Wolstenholme - bass guitar, double bass
- Dominic Howard - drums

Technical Personnel

- John Leckie - production, mixing

== Release history ==
Region	Date	Label	Format	Catalog
United Kingdom	21 February 2000	Mushroom	7"	MUSH68S
United Kingdom	21 February 2000	Mushroom	2CD	MUSH68CDS/MUSH68CDSX
United Kingdom	21 February 2000	Mushroom	CD	MUSE 6
United Kingdom	21 February 2000	Mushroom	12"	MUSE 7
Benelux	21 February 2000	Play It Again Sam	CD	481.2003.22
Germany	21 February 2000	Motor	12"	B033102-01

== Charts ==
Chart (2000)	Peak position
UK Singles (Official Charts)	22
