= Uno (Muse song) =

1999 single by Muse

- Artwork for UK editions

Single by Muse

from the album Showbiz
- B-side: "Agitated" (7")
- Released: 14 June 1999
- Studio: RAK, London
- Genre: Alternative rock; hard rock
- Length: 3:38 (album version); 3:00 (radio edit)
- Label: Taste/Mushroom
- Songwriter: Matt Bellamy
- Producers: Paul Reeve; Muse

Muse singles chronology
"Uno" (1999)	"Cave" (1999)

Audio
- "Uno" by Muse on YouTube

"Uno" is the debut single by English rock band Muse. Written by guitarist and singer Matt Bellamy, it was released in 1999 as the band's lead single from their debut studio album Showbiz (1999). It reached number 73 on the UK Singles Chart.

== Background and composition ==
The song originally featured on Muse's second EP Muscle Museum EP. During recording, the amp used for the guitar blew up. This also happened with other songs while recording Showbiz.

== Music videos ==
Three music videos were produced for "Uno". The first was recorded on Tower Bridge and depicts the band members standing still amongst moving masses of people, with clips from a live soundcheck intercut. This video has been condemned by the band, who have described it as "shameful" and "embarrassing".

The second video—directed by Wolf Gresens and Bernard Wedig—shows the band playing in a room while a woman navigates through a series of corridors in an attempt to find them. She reaches a door behind which Matt Bellamy appears to stand, though upon opening it she finds a large pit, which she manages to avoid falling into. The video ends with the woman staring at a door numbered '1', which appears to be the same as the one she started at.

The third promotional video for "Uno" is made up completely of live performances.

== Release ==
"Uno" was issued on 7" vinyl (backed with "Agitated") and partially transparent CD (with the B-sides "Jimmy Kane" and "Forced In"). Also, an acoustic version of the song was released on standard 7" vinyl.

== Live Performances ==
"Uno" was performed for the first time in 1999 and for the last time in 2015. A live version of "Uno" was released on CD2 of the "Sunburn" single and in the DVD Hullabaloo: Live at Le Zenith, Paris.

== Track listing ==
All songs written and composed by Matt Bellamy.

7" vinyl

1. "Uno" (alternative version) – 3:44
2. "Agitated" – 2:19

CD

1. "Uno" – 3:38
2. "Jimmy Kane" – 3:29
3. "Forced In" – 5:11

iTunes EP

1. "Uno" - 3:38
2. "Jimmy Kane" - 3:29
3. "Uno (Alternative Version)" - 3:44
4. "Forced In" - 4:18
5. "Agitated" - 2:25

"Forced In" has been shortened by one minute on the iTunes version

CD (version allemande)

1. "Uno (Radio Edit)" - 3:03
2. "Pink Ego Box" - 3:33
3. "Do We Need This?" - 4:17
4. "Uno (Album Version)" - 3:38
5. "Muscle Museum (Music Video)" - 3:50

CD (version promotionelle)

1. "Uno (Radio Edit)" - 3:00
2. "Uno" - 3:39

CD (version anglaise)

1. "Uno" - 3:40
2. "Jimmy Kane" - 3:38
3. "Forced In" - 5:04
4. "Agitated" - 2:41

The durations are longer on this single, an error is indicated on the CD says that there is the title Twin but it is indeed Forced In

== Personnel ==
Personnel adapted from Showbiz liner notes

Muse

- Matt Bellamy – vocals, guitar, production, mixing
- Chris Wolstenholme – bass guitar, production, mixing
- Dominic Howard – drums, percussion, production, mixing

Additional personnel

- Paul Reeve – production, mixing, backing vocals
