= Who Knows Who =

Song by Muse and Mike Skinner
- A-side: "Uprising"
- Released: 7 September 2009
- Recorded: 2008
- Genre: Rap rock; hard rock; funk rock
- Length: 3:24
- Label: Helium 3; Warner Bros.
- Composers: Matt Bellamy; Mike Skinner
- Lyricist: Mike Skinner
- Producers: Muse; Morgan Nicholls

"Who Knows Who" is a rap rock song by the English rock band Muse and the English hip hop artist Mike Skinner. The song leaked onto several Muse internet forums in August 2008. and it was confirmed the band let the song leak. The song was officially released as the B-side to the 7" vinyl single "Uprising" in September 2009. The lyrics were written by Skinner and the music was written by Muse's Matt Bellamy.

== Background ==
The first link between Muse and The Streets was created when Muse bassist Chris Wolstenholme broke his wrist playing football shortly before the 2004 V Festival and was replaced by then-Streets bassist Morgan Nicholls, who would become Muse's touring multi-instrumentalist from 2006 until 2019. The two acts first shared a stage at the 2006 Reading and Leeds Festivals on 26 and 27 August, when Muse headlined the main stages. They also both played at the 2007 Big Day Out festival, before Muse chose The Streets to play at the first of their two sell out performances at Wembley Stadium on 16 June 2007. In 2008, Muse announced that they were planning a collaboration with Mike Skinner with the aim of creating "England's answer to Rage Against the Machine". Frontman Matt Bellamy summed up his ambitions as "London rap-rock, just like a little one-off. It might be a laugh!"

== Release ==
On 2 August, a low-posting member by the name of "dopemc" uploaded an mp3 file entitled "Muse and the Streets – Who Knows Who" on the popular fan forum Muselive.

After much debate and discussion among fans, Muse released an official note on their website explaining that "The MP3 floating around on the message boards at the moment is a track we recorded with Mike Skinner a few months ago. The track was the result of a late-night jam session and something we did for a bit of a laugh featuring a blues riff we have been playing live recently (similar to "Heartbreaker" by Led Zeppelin) upon which Skinner recorded some vocals. It is not intended to be a serious release so we are happy for it to be leaked around unofficially. Hope you enjoy, Cheers. Matt, Dom & Chris."

Skinner has since downplayed the quality of the song, saying "We did the track and it felt really genuine, but a bit of a laugh as well. Then the label started getting too excited by it, so I fucked it off. I didn't really think it was that good." He rapped a part of the song during his performance at the BBC Electric Proms on 23 October. "Who Knows Who" was officially released as the B-side to the 7" vinyl single "Uprising" in September 2009, just over a year after the original leak.

== Personnel ==
Musicians

- Mike Skinner – vocals
- Matt Bellamy – guitar, production
- Chris Wolstenholme – bass, production
- Dominic Howard – drums, production

Additional personnel

- Morgan Nicholls – vocal production
- Rich Costey – mixing
- Tommaso Colliva – engineering, mastering
