= Uprising (song) =

2009 single by Muse

Single by Muse

from the album The Resistance
- B-side: "Who Knows Who"; Does It Offend You, Yeah? mix
- Released: 4 August 2009
- Recorded: 2008–2009
- Studio: Studio Bellini (Lake Como, Italy)
- Genre: Alternative rock; space rock; glam rock
- Length: 5:03 (album version); 4:08 (international radio edit); 3:35 (US radio edit)
- Label: Warner Bros.; Helium-3
- Songwriter: Matt Bellamy
- Producer: Muse

Muse singles chronology
"Map of the Problematique" (2007)	"Uprising" (2009)	"Undisclosed Desires" (2009)

"Uprising" is a song by the English rock band Muse, released on 4 August 2009 as the lead single from their fifth studio album, The Resistance (2009). It was written by Matt Bellamy, produced by Muse and mixed by Spike Stent.

"Uprising" reached number 37 on the US Billboard Hot 100 and the top 10 in seven countries. It was certified platinum in the UK, gold in four countries, platinum in five other countries, and double platinum in the United States, making it Muse's best-selling single.

== Composition ==
"Uprising" was described as an alternative rock, space rock, and glam rock song, with elements of industrial. It is composed in the key of D minor with a tempo of 132 beats per minute. It was inspired by the electronica band Goldfrapp and 1970s and 1980s glam rock.

Whereas Muse often combine distorted bass guitar with synthesisers to create basslines, they wanted the rhythm section on "Uprising" to be "real". According to the bassist, Chris Wolstenholme, they created "a bass sound that almost sounded like a synth, but wasn't".

Several critics likened "Uprising" to the theme music from the science fiction TV series Doctor Who. Uncut said "Uprising" combines a schaffel beat, the riff from the 1980 Blondie song "Call Me" and "leftist sloganeering". The songwriter, Matt Bellamy, said the lyrics "sums up how a lot of people feel and it's that we need change".

== Music video ==
The music video was released in September 2009. It features a giant teddy bear destroying buildings, which Rolling Stone interpreted as a homage to the 1984 film Ghostbusters. The video won "Best Special Effects" in the 2010 MTV Video Music Awards and was nominated for "Best Rock Video".

== Release ==
In September 2009, Muse performed "Uprising" for the first time at the 2009 MTV Video Music Awards. "Uprising" reached the top 10 in Belgium (Wallonia), Denmark, Finland, Norway, Scotland, Switzerland, and the United Kingdom. It was certified silver in the United Kingdom, gold in Australia, Belgium, Canada, Italy and New Zealand, and platinum in France and Switzerland and double platinum in the United States.

"Uprising" was Muse's first entry on the Billboard Hot 100, reaching number 37 on the week ending 3 October, and spent 20 weeks on the Hot 100. It had sold 2,170,000 copies in the US as of April 2013.

"Uprising" reached number one on the US Billboard Alternative Songs chart on 9 September 2009. It was Muse's sixth top-10 single and first number one on the chart, and spent 17 weeks at number one, becoming the second longest-running number one song ever on the chart at the time. As songs on the chart are retired for charting out of the top 10 beyond week 52, "Uprising" was removed for a week after logging its 52nd week for missing the top 10. However, the following week it gained enough points to return to the top 10, returning it to the chart for a 53rd week.

== Critical reception ==
"Uprising" won Best Single at the 2010 Music Producers Guild Awards. Accepting the award, Bellamy thanked John Leckie, the producer of their first two albums, for "teaching us how to produce". He also thanked the producer Rick Rubin "for teaching us how not to produce", which some sources took to mean Muse had fired Rubin after a failed collaboration. Bellamy later said his comment had been misconstrued and that Muse had never worked with Rubin; instead, he said Muse had been inspired by stories of his "hands-off" production style.

In 2013, Billboard named "Uprising" number one in its Alternative Songs 25th-anniversary list of the top 100 songs to enter the chart. It was ranked number three on an updated version of the list in 2023, after the success of All Time Low's "Monsters" and Lovelytheband's "Broken" in the late 2010s and early 2020s. In 2026, Rolling Stone named "Uprising" the 131st-best rock song of the 21st century so far.

Bellamy expressed discomfort that "Uprising" was used in YouTube videos advocating for conspiracy theories, saying "the conspiracy theory subculture has been hijacked by the right to try to take down people like Obama and put forward rightwing libertarianism". Muse refused requests from American politicians to use "Uprising" in their rallies.

== Personnel ==
Muse

- Matt Bellamy – vocals, guitars, synthesisers, production
- Chris Wolstenholme – bass guitar, backing vocals
- Dominic Howard – drums, percussion

Additional personnel

- Tom Kirk – handclaps, backing vocals
- Adrian Bushby – engineering, handclaps, backing vocals
- Paul Reeve – additional vocal production, handclaps, backing vocals

== Track listing ==
=== 7-inch ===
- Warner Bros. — WEA458

No.	Title	Length
1.	"Uprising"	5:04
2.	"Who Knows Who" (with Mike Skinner)	3:24

=== CD ===
- Warner Bros. — WEA458CD

No.	Title	Length
1.	"Uprising"	5:04
2.	"Uprising" (Does It Offend You, Yeah? Mix)	4:00

=== Download ===
iTunes release
No.	Title	Length
1.	"Uprising"	5:04
2.	"Uprising" (Does It Offend You, Yeah? Mix)	4:00
3.	"Uprising" (Live from Teignmouth)	5:37

== Charts ==
=== Weekly charts ===
Chart (2009–2010)	Peak position
Australia (ARIA)	23
Austria (Ö3 Austria Top 40)	29
Belgium (Ultratop 50 Flanders)	12
Belgium (Ultratop 50 Wallonia)	6
Canada Hot 100 (Billboard)	28
Canada Rock (Billboard)	9
Denmark (Tracklisten)	5
Europe (European Hot 100)	17
Finland (Suomen virallinen lista)	8
France (SNEP)	74
Germany (GfK)	40
Hungary (Rádiós Top 40)	3
Ireland (IRMA)	11
Italy (FIMI)	14
Netherlands (Dutch Top 40)	22
Netherlands (Single Top 100)	22
New Zealand (Recorded Music NZ)	12
Norway (VG-lista)	4
Scottish Singles Sales (Official Charts)	2
Sweden (Sverigetopplistan)	13
Switzerland (Schweizer Hitparade)	8
UK Singles (Official Charts)	9
US Billboard Hot 100	37
US Adult Pop Airplay (Billboard)	14
US Hot Rock & Alternative Songs (Billboard)	2

=== Year-end charts ===
Chart (2009)	Position
Belgium (Ultratop 50 Flanders)	95
Belgium (Ultratop 50 Wallonia)	43
Hungary (Rádiós Top 40)	61
Italy (FIMI)	59
Switzerland (Schweizer Hitparade)	59
UK Singles (OCC)	161
US Hot Rock Songs (Billboard)	33

Chart (2010)	Position
US Adult Top 40 (Billboard)	49
US Hot Rock Songs (Billboard)	2

=== Decade-end charts ===
Chart (2010–2019)	Position
US Hot Rock Songs (Billboard)	30

== Certifications and sales ==
Region	Certification	Certified units/sales
Australia (ARIA)	Gold	35,000^{^}
Belgium (BRMA)	Gold	15,000^{*}
Canada (Music Canada)	Gold	40,000^{*}
Denmark (IFPI Danmark)	Platinum	90,000^{‡}
France (SNEP)	Diamond	333,333^{‡}
Italy (FIMI)	Platinum	50,000^{‡}
New Zealand (RMNZ)	2× Platinum	60,000^{‡}
Portugal (AFP)	Platinum	20,000^{‡}
Spain (Promusicae)	Platinum	60,000^{‡}
Switzerland (IFPI Switzerland)	Platinum	30,000^{^}
United Kingdom (BPI)	Platinum	600,000^{‡}
United States (RIAA)	2× Platinum	2,170,000
^{*} Sales figures based on certification alone.^{^} Shipments figures based on certification alone.^{‡} Sales+streaming figures based on certification alone.

== Release history ==
Release dates and formats for "Uprising"
Region	Date	Format	Label(s)	Ref.
United States	October 5, 2009	Mainstream airplay	Warner Bros.	
