= Cave (Muse song) =

Single by Muse

from the album Showbiz
- B-side: Instrumental remix (7")
- Released: 6 September 1999
- Recorded: 1999
- Studio: Sawmills Studio, Cornwall, England
- Genre: Alternative rock, space rock
- Length: 4:46 (album version); 3:06 (radio edit)
- Label: Taste/Mushroom
- Songwriter: Matt Bellamy
- Producer: John Leckie

Muse singles chronology
"Uno" (1999)	"Cave" (1999)	"Muscle Museum" (1999)

"Cave" is a song by English rock band Muse, released as the second single from their 1999 debut album Showbiz.

== Content ==
Bellamy has given two statements about what "Cave" is about. Once he said it was about "an old friend of mine" in a strangely warbled voice before a live performance of the song and on a different occasion he stated "The idea for Cave came from that rubbish American book, Men Are from Mars, Women Are from Venus. There's this bit about how men go into a cave when they get stressed and I think that's probably true, although, personally, I tend to let it out. I did have a bit of a tantrum in my hotel bathroom last night – but I managed to repair the toilet, so that's OK."

== Release ==
"Cave" was released on 6 September 1999 on 7" vinyl—backed with an instrumental remix of the song—and double CD—backed with a remix of the song alongside "Twin", "Host" and "Coma";—on 6 September 1999. It reached number 52 in the UK Singles Chart—an improvement of 21 positions on "Uno". In the United States a five-track extended play was also released by Maverick Records. "Cave" also appears on the soundtrack for the film Little Nicky.

== Performances ==
A piano version of this song was played during the Resistance Tour live performances, which marks the first time since 2001 the song had been performed live. Matt Bellamy has stated he dislikes performing this song because of the extended word "Cave" during the chorus.

== Track listing ==
All tracks are written by Matt Bellamy.

7"
No.	Title	Length
1.	"Cave"	4:46
2.	"Cave" (instrumental remix)	5:04
Total length:		9:50

'CD1'
No.	Title	Length
1.	"Cave"	4:46
2.	"Twin"	3:18
3.	"Cave" (remix)	5:08
Total length:		13:12

'CD2'
No.	Title	Length
1.	"Cave"	4:46
2.	"Host"	4:17
3.	"Coma"	3:35
Total length:		12:38

== Personnel ==
Personnel adapted from Showbiz liner notes

Muse

- Matt Bellamy – vocals, guitar, piano, CS1 synthesiser
- Chris Wolstenholme – bass guitar
- Dominic Howard – drums

Technical personnel

- John Leckie – production, mixing
- Boris – “tape abuse“
