= Hysteria (Muse song) =

- Standard artwork

Single by Muse

from the album Absolution
- B-side: "Eternally Missed"
- Released: 1 December 2003
- Recorded: 2002–2003
- Studio: Air Studios, London; Livingston Recording Studios, London
- Genre: Alternative rock; hard rock
- Length: 3:47
- Label: East West
- Composers: Matt Bellamy; Dominic Howard; Chris Wolstenholme
- Lyricist: Matt Bellamy
- Producers: Rich Costey; Muse

Muse singles chronology
"Time Is Running Out" (2003)	"Hysteria" (2003)	"Sing for Absolution" (2004)

Music video
- "Hysteria" by Muse on YouTube

"Hysteria" is a song by the English rock band Muse, released on 1 December 2003 as the third single from their third studio album, Absolution (2003). It was produced by Muse and Rich Costey. It features a distorted bassline and lyrics about a soul-consuming obsession.

"Hysteria" reached number 17 on the UK singles chart and number 9 on the US Modern Rock Tracks chart. Its bassline was voted among the greatest of all time by MusicRadar readers and by Guitar World.

== Recording ==
According to the bassist, Chris Wolstenholme, "Hysteria" originated in a jam during a soundcheck in Doncaster, England, with the guitarist, Matt Bellamy, playing the riff in a blues style. Wolstenholme transferred the riff to bass guitar and changed it to a "machine-gun-like" pattern composed entirely of sixteenth notes. He split his signal into three Marshall amps, one clean and two distorted, and blended the results with a synthesiser. Muse processed it using the sound design system Kyma.

Bellamy restructured "Hysteria" after feedback from the producer, Rich Costey. The lyrics describe a soul-consuming obsession. Muse recorded it at Air Studios in late 2002 and completed it at Livingston Recording Studios in early 2003, both in London. In 2025, Wolstenholme said "Hysteria" was his favourite Muse bassline.

== Music video ==
Two music videos were made for "Hysteria". In the European video, a man (played by Justin Theroux) obsessively views videos of a prostitute and destroys a hotel room in rage. It recalls a similar scene in the 1982 film Pink Floyd – The Wall. The American video features Muse playing before a montage of projected images.

== Release ==
"Hysteria" was released on December 1 2003 as the third single from Absolution. It was played regularly by BBC Radio 1, MTV2 and Kerrang! TV and helped return Absolution to the UK Albums Chart in January 2004.

Performances of "Hysteria" are included the live videos Absolution Tour (2005) and HAARP (2008). A demo and a live version appeared on Absolution XX, the Absolution reissue released in 2023. "Hysteria" was featured in the 2023 video game Fortnite Festival.

== Reception ==
In NME, Kirssi Murison described "Hysteria" as "self-indulgent warp-speed rock" that "manages to wrap up Muse's pomp and majesty in what is a fabulously transparent, bewilderingly unpretentious, pop-glam hit". In American Songwriter, Bryan Reesman said "Hysteria" was "amazingly aggressive and cathartic" and "certainly one of the most memorable bass lines of the modern rock era ... one of Muse's most potent tracks".

In 2012, "Hysteria" was voted the best Muse song by NME readers. Its bassline was named the sixth-best of all time by MusicRadar in 2011 and the fourth-best by Guitar World in 2022. In 2022, Guitar World named it among the ten best Muse basslines.

== Track listing ==
- 7", CD
1. "Hysteria" – 3:47
2. "Eternally Missed" – 6:05
  - Produced by John Cornfield, Paul Reeve and Muse
- DVD
1. "Hysteria" (video – Director's Cut)
2. "Hysteria" (DVD Audio)
3. "Hysteria" (live on MTV2 Video)
4. "Artwork Gallery"

== Charts ==
=== Weekly charts ===
Weekly chart performance for "Hysteria"
Chart (2003–2005)	Peak position
Australia (ARIA)	61
France (SNEP)	77
Italy (FIMI)	31
Netherlands (Single Top 100)	92
Scottish Singles Sales (Official Charts)	16
Spain (Promusicae)	20
UK Singles (Official Charts)	17
UK Rock & Metal (Official Charts)	1
US Bubbling Under Hot 100 (Billboard)	18
US Alternative Airplay (Billboard)	9

=== Year-end charts ===
2004 year-end chart performance for "Hysteria"
Chart (2004)	Position
US Modern Rock Tracks (Billboard)	94

2005 year-end chart performance for "Hysteria"
Chart (2005)	Position
US Modern Rock Tracks (Billboard)	39

== Certifications ==
Certifications for "Hysteria"
Region	Certification	Certified units/sales
Italy (FIMI)	Gold	50,000^{‡}
New Zealand (RMNZ)	Platinum	30,000^{‡}
Spain (Promusicae)	Gold	30,000^{‡}
United Kingdom (BPI)	Platinum	600,000^{‡}
^{‡} Sales+streaming figures based on certification alone.
