= Muscle Museum =

1999 single by Muse

- 'CD1' cover

Single by Muse

from the album Showbiz
- B-side: "Minimum" (7"); "Do We Need This?" (CD1); "Pink Ego Box" (CD2); "Con-Science" (CD2)
- Released: 22 November 1999
- Recorded: April 1999 at Sawmills Studio, Cornwall, England
- Genre: Alternative rock
- Length: 4:22 (album version); 5:25 (full-length version); 3:55 (radio edit)
- Label: Taste/Mushroom
- Songwriter: Matt Bellamy
- Producers: Paul Reeve; Muse

Muse singles chronology
"Cave" (1999)	"Muscle Museum" (1999)	"Sunburn" (2000)

"Muscle Museum" is a song by the English rock band Muse, released as the third single from their 1999 debut album Showbiz. Written by lead singer Matt Bellamy, the song's title likely derives from the fact that the words "muscle" and "museum" come immediately before and after the word "muse" in some dictionaries. The song peaked at number 25 on the UK Singles Chart.

== Music video ==
The music video is directed by Joseph Kahn and features different people in a suburban neighbourhood, crying in different situations, as Muse plays in a high school after a party, as a janitor cleans up. As the video goes on, some of the townspeople attempt suicide, and by the end of the video, the janitor breaks down. Joseph Kahn wanted to express the "sadness" of life in the suburbs where every house looks more or less the same. Individual expression is not possible because of the surroundings and the rules in those suburbs, happiness (or pretending to be happy) is mandatory.

Though Joseph Kahn himself thinks of the video as one of the best he made, he believes that most people, including Muse, don't like the video.

== Release ==
"Muscle Museum" was released on 22 November 1999 on 7" vinyl—backed with "Minimum"—and double CD—backed with "Do We Need This?", a live acoustic version of the song, "Pink Ego Box" and "Con-Science". It reached #43 in the UK Singles Chart—an improvement of nine positions on "Cave".

The song is available to play on Rocksmith 2014 as part of a Muse 5-song pack.

== Live performances ==
"Muscle Museum" was a staple in the band's live performances from 1997 until 2004. The song made occasional appearances on the Black Holes and Revelations Tour, and later, the Psycho Tour and Drones World Tour. The song has not been performed since 2018.

== Charts ==
Chart (1999–2000)	Peak performance
Netherlands (Single Top 100)	100
UK Singles (Official Charts)	25
UK Indie (Official Charts)	5

== Track listing ==
All tracks are written by Matt Bellamy.

7"
No.	Title	Length
1.	"Muscle Museum"	4:22
2.	"Minimum"	2:40
Total length:		7:02

'CD1'
No.	Title	Length
1.	"Muscle Museum"	4:22
2.	"Do We Need This?"	4:15
3.	"Muscle Museum" (live acoustic version)	4:44
Total length:		13:21

'CD2'
No.	Title	Length
1.	"Muscle Museum" (full-length version)	5:25
2.	"Pink Ego Box"	3:32
3.	"Con-Science"	4:52
Total length:		13:49

== Personnel ==
Personnel adapted from Showbiz liner notes

Muse

- Matt Bellamy - vocals, guitar, piano, Mellotron, production, mixing
- Chris Wolstenholme - bass guitar, production, mixing
- Dominic Howard - drums, "radio noise", production, mixing

Additional Personnel

- Paul Reeve - production, mixing

== Re-release ==
"Muscle Museum"

Single by Muse

from the album Showbiz
- Released: 9 October 2000
- Label: Taste/Mushroom

Muse singles chronology
"Unintended" (2000)	"Muscle Museum" (2000)	"Plug In Baby" (2001)

A "US Mix" of "Muscle Museum" was released on 9 October 2000 on 7" vinyl—backed with a live version of "Escape"—and double CD—backed with a live version of "Agitated", the 'Timo Maas Sunstroke Remix' of "Sunburn", the 'Saint US Mix' of "Sober" and the 'Soulwax Remix' of the song. It reached number 25 in the UK Singles Chart—eighteen positions higher than its original release.

7" (MUSH84S)
No.	Title	Length
1.	"Muscle Museum" (US Mix)	4:29
2.	"Escape" (live)	3:34
Total length:		8:03

CD1 (MUSH84CDS)
No.	Title	Length
1.	"Muscle Museum" (US Mix)	4:29
2.	"Agitated" (live)	3:11
3.	"Sunburn" (Timo Maas Sunstroke Mix)	6:27
4.	"Muscle Museum" (live video)	4:29
Total length:		18:36

CD2 (MUSH84CDSX)
No.	Title	Length
1.	"Muscle Museum" (US Mix)	4:29
2.	"Sober" (Saint US Mix)	4:04
3.	"Muscle Museum" (Soulwax Remix)	3:46
Total length:		12:19

Remix promo CD (MUSE 10)
No.	Title	Length
1.	"Muscle Museum" (radio edit)	3:58
2.	"Sober" (The Saint Remix)	4:04
3.	"Sunburn" (Timo Maas Sunstroke Mix)	6:44
Total length:		14:46

== Release history ==
Region	Date	Label	Format	Catalog
United Kingdom	22 November 1999	Mushroom	7"	MUSH66S
United Kingdom	22 November 1999	Mushroom	2CD	MUSH66CDS/MUSH66CDSX
United Kingdom	22 November 1999	Mushroom	CD	MUSE 5
Australia	22 November 1999	Mushroom	CD	561 360-2
Benelux	22 November 1999	Play It Again Sam	CD	481.2002.22
France	22 November 1999	Naïve	2CD	NV 3212-4/NV 3212-5
Germany	22 November 1999	Motor	CD+	561 360-2
United States	22 November 1999	Maverick	CD	PRO-CD-9841
Worldwide reissue	9 October 2000	Mushroom	7"	MUSH84S
Worldwide reissue	9 October 2000	Mushroom	2CD	MUSH84CDS/MUSH84CDSX
Worldwide reissue	9 October 2000	Mushroom	CD	MUSE 10
