= Showbiz (Muse album) =

1999 studio album

Studio album by Muse
- Released: 7 September 1999
- Recorded: 1998 ("Muscle Museum" and "Uno"); April and May 1999
- Studios: RAK (London); Sawmills (Fowey, England)
- Genres: Alternative rock; indie rock; hard rock
- Length: 49:36
- Label: Taste (Note: Also released through Mushroom Records in the United Kingdom and Oceania, Maverick Records in the United States, PIAS Recordings in Benelux, Motor Music in Germany, Naïve Records in France, and maximum10 in Japan.)
- Producers: John Leckie; Muse; Paul Reeve

Muse chronology
Muscle Museum (1999)	Showbiz (1999)	Random 1–8 (2000)

Muse studio album chronology
Showbiz (1999)	Origin of Symmetry (2001)

Singles from Showbiz
- 1. "Uno" Released: 14 June 1999; 2. "Cave" Released: 6 September 1999; 3. "Muscle Museum" Released: 22 November 1999; 4. "Sunburn" Released: 21 February 2000; 5. "Unintended" Released: 5 June 2000

Showbiz is the debut studio album by the English rock band Muse, first released in France on 7 September 1999 through Naïve Records and in the United Kingdom on 4 October 1999 through Taste Media. It was produced by Muse, John Leckie and Paul Reeve at RAK Studios and Sawmills Studio.

"Uno", "Cave", "Muscle Museum", "Sunburn" and "Unintended" were released as singles. Showbiz drew mainly positive reviews and reached number 29 on the UK Albums Chart. As of 2018, it had sold more than 1.2 million copies worldwide.

== Recording ==
Muse recorded Showbiz between April and May 1999. However, the album included some older songs in the band's repertoire, many of which can date as far back as 1996. Most of the songs on Showbiz had already been written at least by 1997. The songs featured on the album were among the "fifty or so" that Matt Bellamy had written before entering the studio. The band selected the songs which they deemed to be the more conventional and "straight-forward" to make up Showbiz. While the songs contain an eclectic and diverse sound featuring subtle classical, jazz, blues, Latin, and world music influences, they have a distinct and cohesive alternative rock aesthetic. The more experimental material was left out of the album to be included as B-sides in the single releases. A few of those songs were later featured on the compilation album Hullabaloo Soundtrack.

John Leckie, the producer, started attending Muse's concerts in late 1998. Leckie was based at Sawmills recording studio, where the owner, Dennis Smith, had given the band free recording time the previous year, from which the Muse EP had resulted in 1998. Leckie built a relationship with the band, coming to say that he'd "want to work with the band if ever they could afford him". Leckie had not worked with many bands for some time prior to doing so with Muse. The recording was finished by 15 May 1999.

== Reception ==
Professional ratings
Review scores
Source	Rating
AllMusic	3.5/5 stars
No Ripcord	9/10
NME	6/10
Pitchfork	6.7/10
Rolling Stone	3/5 stars
USA Today	3/4 stars

Showbiz drew mainly positive reviews. Several critics drew comparisons to Radiohead. Neva Chonin of Rolling Stone wrote that Showbiz "matches Thom Yorke's penchant for majestic agony – screams and the word self-destruction pepper the title track – but with an edge that's quirkier and decidedly more ragged than their elders". Brent DiCrescenzo of Pitchfork said that "Muse expertly boil down Radiohead into punkish radio nuggets", but asked: "Despite this promise, where can they go from here?" Leckie, who also produced Radiohead's 1995 album The Bends, dismissed the comparisons, saying: "In the late 90s, any British band that sang passionately and played guitar was going to get compared to Radiohead." He said he chose to produce Muse after Radiohead because he had "intentionally looked for something different".

NME said that "Showbiz is not as clever as they think it is ... 'Unintended' and the title track are overwrought, prone to excruciatingly bad pseudo poetry." Edna Gundersen of USA Today wrote that it "offers smart, seductive rock that's sophisticated but not stuffy, fun but not frilly", and that the songs "get a boost from the handsome voice of Matthew Bellamy, who builds tension by vocally snowballing from a hushed intensity to full-throttle wails".

The sleeve design was criticised by the Muse biographer Ben Myers, who wrote that it was "just plain strange. Ill-advised. Tacky, even ... [It] recalled the sort of artwork that Eighties prog-rock revivalists like Marillion used or, worse still, the doodlings of a sci-fi obsessed A-Level art student" rather than "an exciting, new, distinctly modern band".

== Track listing ==
All tracks are written by Matt Bellamy

Showbiz – Standard edition
No.	Title	Length
1.	"Sunburn"	3:54
2.	"Muscle Museum"	4:23
3.	"Fillip"	4:01
4.	"Falling Down"	4:33
5.	"Cave"	4:46
6.	"Showbiz"	5:16
7.	"Unintended"	3:57
8.	"Uno"	3:37
9.	"Sober"	4:04
10.	"Escape"	3:31
11.	"Overdue"	2:26
12.	"Hate This and I'll Love You"	5:09
Total length:		49:36

Japanese release
No.	Title	Length
13.	"Spiral Static"	4:44
Total length:		54:20

== Personnel ==
Personnel adapted from Showbiz CD liner notes

Muse

- Matt Bellamy – lead vocals (all tracks), guitars (1–8, 10–12), piano (1–6); Mellotron (2, 7, 12); Wurlitzer electric piano (3, 12); Hammond organ (4, 7, 10); CS1 synthesiser (5), guitar synthesiser (9); harmonium (10); string arrangements (6); " alien samples" (9); production and mixing (2, 7–9); artwork
- Chris Wolstenholme – bass guitar (1–3, 5–12); backing vocals (10); double bass (1, 4); "slap nylon bass" (6); production and mixing (2, 7–9)
- Dominic Howard – drums (all tracks); percussion (6, 8, 12); "radio noise" (2); production and mixing (2, 7–9)

Additional personnel

- John Leckie – production and mixing (1, 3–6, 10–12); "crickets" (12)
- Paul Reeve – production and mixing (2, 7–9); backing vocals (7, 8, 11, 12)
- Boris – "tape abuse" (5)
- Tanya Andrew – artwork
- Craig Gentle – design
- Ralf Strathmann – photography
- Frederic Gresse – photography

== Charts ==
=== Weekly charts ===
Chart (1999–2000)	Peak position
Australian Albums (ARIA)	28
Belgian Albums (Ultratop Flanders)	29
Belgian Albums (Ultratop Wallonia)	41
Dutch Albums (Album Top 100)	53
Finnish Albums (Suomen virallinen lista)	45
French Albums (SNEP)	59
Irish Albums (IRMA)	46
Italian Albums (FIMI)	87
Japanese Albums (Oricon)	69
Norwegian Albums (VG-lista)	38
Scottish Albums (Official Charts)	48
UK Albums (Official Charts)	29
UK Rock & Metal Albums (OCC)	11

=== Year-end charts ===
Chart (2001)	Position
UK Albums (OCC)	179

== Certifications ==
Region	Certification	Certified units/sales
Australia (ARIA)	Gold	35,000^{^}
Belgium (BRMA)	Gold	25,000^{*}
Netherlands (NVPI)	Gold	50,000^{^}
United Kingdom (BPI)	Platinum	500,000
^{*} Sales figures based on certification alone.^{^} Shipments figures based on certification alone.

== Release history ==
Region	Date	Label	Format	Catalog
France	7 September 1999	Naïve	CD	NV 3211-1
Germany	20 September 1999	Motor	CD	547 979-4
Russia	20 September 1999	Motor	CD	547 979-4
Turkey	20 September 1999	Motor	CD	547 979-4
Ukraine	20 September 1999	Motor	CD	547 979-4
United States	28 September 1999	Maverick	CD	0 9362-47382-2 0
United Kingdom	4 October 1999	Taste/Mushroom	CD	MUSH59CD
United Kingdom	4 October 1999	Taste/Mushroom	LP	MUSH59LP
United Kingdom	4 October 1999	Taste/Mushroom	CS	MUSH59MC
United Kingdom	4 October 1999	Taste/Mushroom	MD	MUSH59MD
Benelux	4 October 1999	PIAS	CD	481.2001.20
Japan	4 October 1999	Avex Trax	CD	AVCM-65057
