= Unintended (song) =

- 'CD1' cover

Single by Muse

from the album Showbiz
- B-side: "Recess"; "Nishe"
- Released: 5 June 2000
- Recorded: April 1999
- Studio: RAK studios, London, England
- Genre: Alternative rock; soft rock; acoustic rock
- Length: 3:57
- Label: Taste; Mushroom
- Songwriter: Matt Bellamy
- Producers: Paul Reeve; Muse

Muse singles chronology
"Sunburn" (2000)	"Unintended" (2000)	"Muscle Museum" (2000)

Music video
- "Unintended" by Muse on YouTube

"Unintended" is a song by English rock band Muse, released as the fifth and final single from their 1999 debut album, Showbiz. It peaked at number 20 on the UK Singles Chart in June 2000 and reached number five in Norway in 2008.

== Release ==
The song was released on 5 June 2000 on 7" vinyl – backed with a live version of "Sober" – double CD – backed with "Recess", a live acoustic version of "Falling Down", "Nishe" and a live acoustic version of "Hate This & I'll Love You" – and cassette – backed with "Recess". It reached number 20 on the UK Singles Chart, becoming the highest-charting single from the album, and became a top-five hit in Norway in 2008, peaking at number five on the VG-lista chart.

== Music video ==
The music video features many lovers 'blending' around each other as Matth Bellamy and the band sit around. The blending effect is achieved using the slit-scan technique.

== Live performances ==
"Unintended" was performed consistently by the band until 2001. After this, it was performed occasionally in 2007, as well as on rare occasions during The Resistance Tour and The 2nd Law Tour. After 2013 the song didn't return until 2025, being played at various festivals that year including Pinkpop in the Netherlands. The 2025 performances were based on the piano arrangement showcased on Bellamy's debut solo album Cryosleep.

== Acoustic version ==
On 23 June 2020 Matt Bellamy posted on his social media the release of an acoustic version of Unintended based on the arpeggio pattern from Bach's Prelude in C major from The Well-Tempered Clavier.

On 26 June the single was released on YouTube, Deezer, Amazon Music, Spotify and Apple Music on an EP, along with two other versions:

1. Unintended (Acoustic version)
2. Unintended A.I. Dream V.3 (Obeebo A.I.)
3. Unintended (Piano Lullaby) [Instrumental]

Also, Bellamy wrote a tweet:

I wrote this song when I was around 19 years old and it seems more relevant today than it was back then!

== Track listing ==
All tracks are written by Matt Bellamy.

7"
No.	Title	Length
1.	"Unintended"	3:57
2.	"Sober" (live)	4:07
Total length:		8:04

'CD1'
No.	Title	Length
1.	"Unintended"	3:57
2.	"Recess"	3:35
3.	"Falling Down" (live acoustic version)	5:10
4.	"Unintended" (music video)	4:00
Total length:		16:42

'CD2'
No.	Title	Length
1.	"Unintended"	3:57
2.	"Nishe"	2:42
3.	"Hate This & I'll Love You" (live acoustic version)	5:00
Total length:		11:39

Cassette
No.	Title	Length
1.	"Unintended"	3:59
2.	"Recess"	3:37
Total length:		7:36

== Personnel ==
Personnel taken from Showbiz liner notes.

Muse

- Matt Bellamy - vocals, nylon-string guitar, Hammond organ, Mellotron, production, mixing
- Chris Wolstenholme - bass guitar, production, mixing
- Dominic Howard - drums, production, mixing

Additional Personnel

- Paul Reeve - production, mixing, backing vocals

== Charts ==
Chart (2000–2008)	Peak position
Netherlands (Single Top 100)	99
Norway (VG-lista)	5
Scottish Singles Sales (Official Charts)	17
UK Singles (Official Charts)	20
UK Indie (Official Charts)	1

== Release history ==
Region	Date	Label	Format	Catalog
United Kingdom	5 June 2000	Mushroom	7"	MUSH72S
United Kingdom	5 June 2000	Mushroom	2CD	MUSH72CDS/MUSH72CDSX
United Kingdom	5 June 2000	Mushroom	CS	MUSH72MCS
United Kingdom	5 June 2000	Mushroom	CD	MUSE 8
Benelux	5 June 2000	Play It Again Sam	CD	481.2004.22
