= Chris Wolstenholme =

English bassist (born 1978)

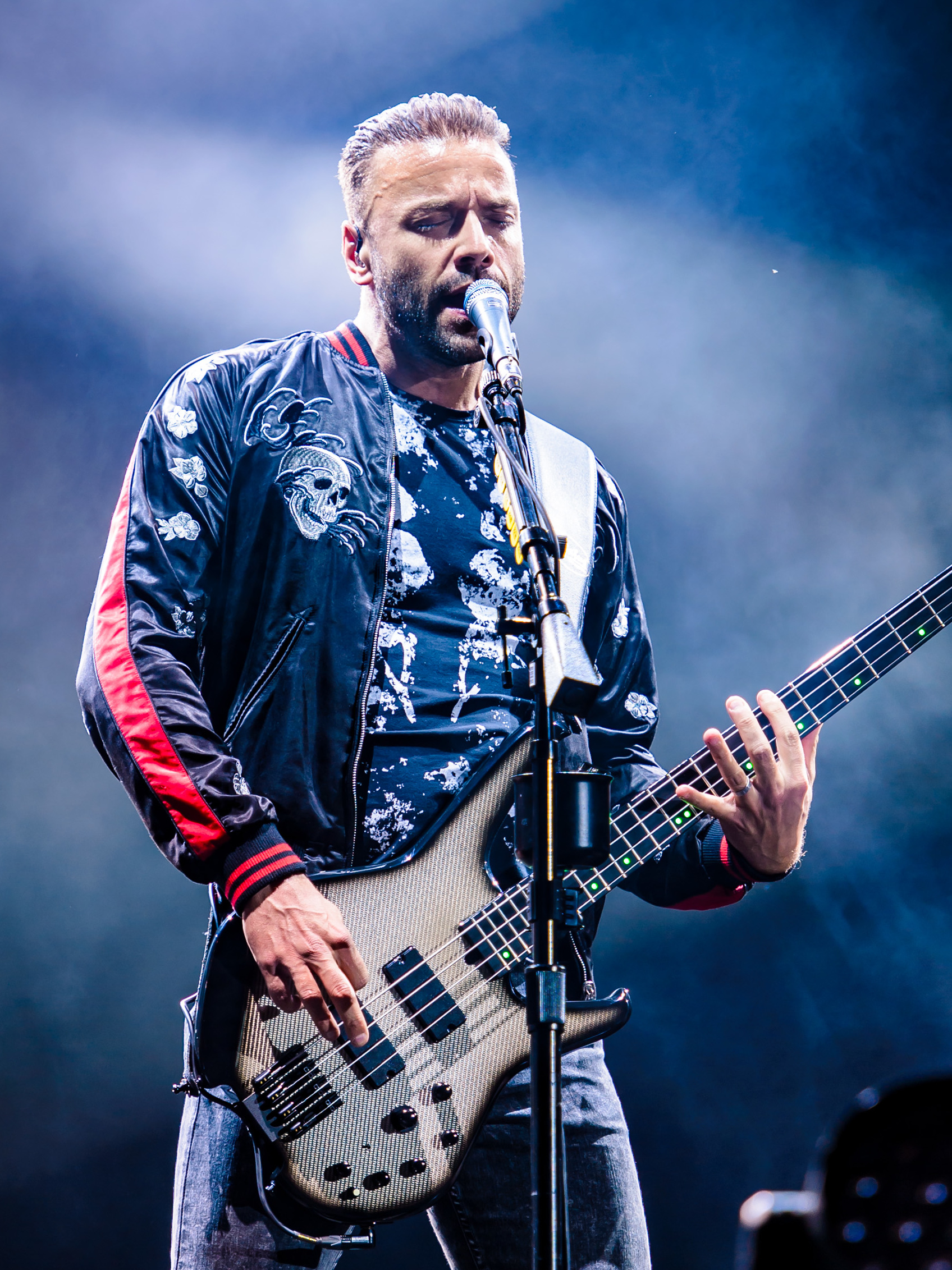
- Wolstenholme performing with Muse in 2018

Background information
- Also known as: Chromes
- Born: Christopher Tony Wolstenholme; 2 December 1978 (age 47); Rotherham, South Yorkshire, England
- Genres: Alternative rock; progressive rock; hard rock; art rock; space rock; electronica
- Occupation: Musician
- Instruments: Bass guitar; vocals
- Years active: 1991–present
- Member of: Muse
- Spouses: Kelly Wolstenholme (m. 2003, divorced) Caris Ball (m. 2018)

Christopher Tony Wolstenholme (born 2 December 1978) is an English musician. He is the bassist and backing vocalist for the rock band Muse. He combines bass guitar with effects and synthesisers to create overdriven fuzz bass tones, a motif of many Muse songs. He wrote and sang lead vocals from two songs from Muse's sixth album, The 2nd Law (2012). In 2024, Wolstenholme launched a solo project, Chromes.

== Early life ==
Chris Wolstenholme grew up in the English town of Rotherham before moving to Teignmouth, Devon, where he played drums for a post-punk band. His father worked in the coal industry. Wolstenholme met the guitarist Matt Bellamy and the drummer Dominic Howard while their bands rehearsed in the same building. Bellamy and Howard convinced Wolstenholme to take up bass and start a band with them, initially called Rocket Baby Dolls. The band was renamed Muse in 1994.

== Musicianship ==
Wolstenholme's basslines are a central motif of many Muse songs. Rather than playing root notes, his basslines often perform a lead role, such as in the 2003 song "Hysteria". He processes his bass guitar with effects (such as distortion and octavers) and combines them with synthesisers. He typically splits his guitar signal into multiple Marshall amplifiers — one without distortion, another distorted with a Big Muff pedal, and a third distorted with an Animato pedal — and blends the results. Like Bellamy, Wolstenholme uses touch-screen controllers built into his guitars to control synthesisers and effects including Kaoss Pads and DigiTech Whammy pedals.

Wolstenholme mostly plays with his fingers, rather than a plectrum, as he prefers the sound for most songs. According to the producer Rich Costey, who has worked with Muse on several occasions, "His finger strength is staggering ... He hits the strings really goddamn hard. It sounds that way because that's the way he plays." On their 2009 song "Undisclosed Desires", he played slap bass. Wolstenholme wrote and sang lead vocals on "Liquid State" and "Save Me" on Muse's sixth album, The 2nd Law (2012).

== Other work ==
Wolstenholme played bass on Moriaty's 2015 single "Bones". He also contributed to Rick Parfitt's posthumous solo album Over and Out (2018). In August 2024, Wolstenholme announced a solo project, Chromes, and released the singles "Imaginary World" and "The Good Life".

== Personal life ==
Wolstenholme married his girlfriend, Kelly, on 23 December 2003. They have six children. In April 2010, the family moved to Foxrock, County Dublin, Ireland. After Wolstenholme and Kelly divorced, Wolstenholme married Caris Ball on 1 December 2018, the day before his 40th birthday. The couple have a daughter and a son, as well as Ball's two previous daughters, giving Wolstenholme ten children in total. Wolstenholme is a supporter of Rotherham United, his hometown football team. He was awarded an honorary doctorate of arts from the University of Plymouth in 2008.

Wolstenholme has struggled with alcoholism. In a 2011 interview, he said he would drink so much he would vomit blood, but did not grasp the severity of his situation. His bandmates did not notice his problem for several years, as his playing was unaffected; according to Bellamy, Wolstenholme would perform "brilliantly" and then disappear to his room, so "we wouldn't really know what was going on". His bandmates broached the subject of his drinking several times without success. They eventually gave him an ultimatum to stop drinking.

In 2008, Wolstenholme began having panic attacks triggered by his drinking. He eventually realised that drinking would kill him, as it had his father. His alcoholism did not affect his playing until the recording of Muse's fifth album, The Resistance (2009), at which point he went into rehab. He wrote two songs about his experience, "Liquid State" and "Save Me", which appeared on Muse's sixth album, The 2nd Law (2012). In 2012, Wolstenholme said: "I threw myself into music in a way I hadn't done for 10 years. It sounds corny but it was the only thing that made me feel peaceful."
