= Dominic Howard =

English drummer (born 1977)

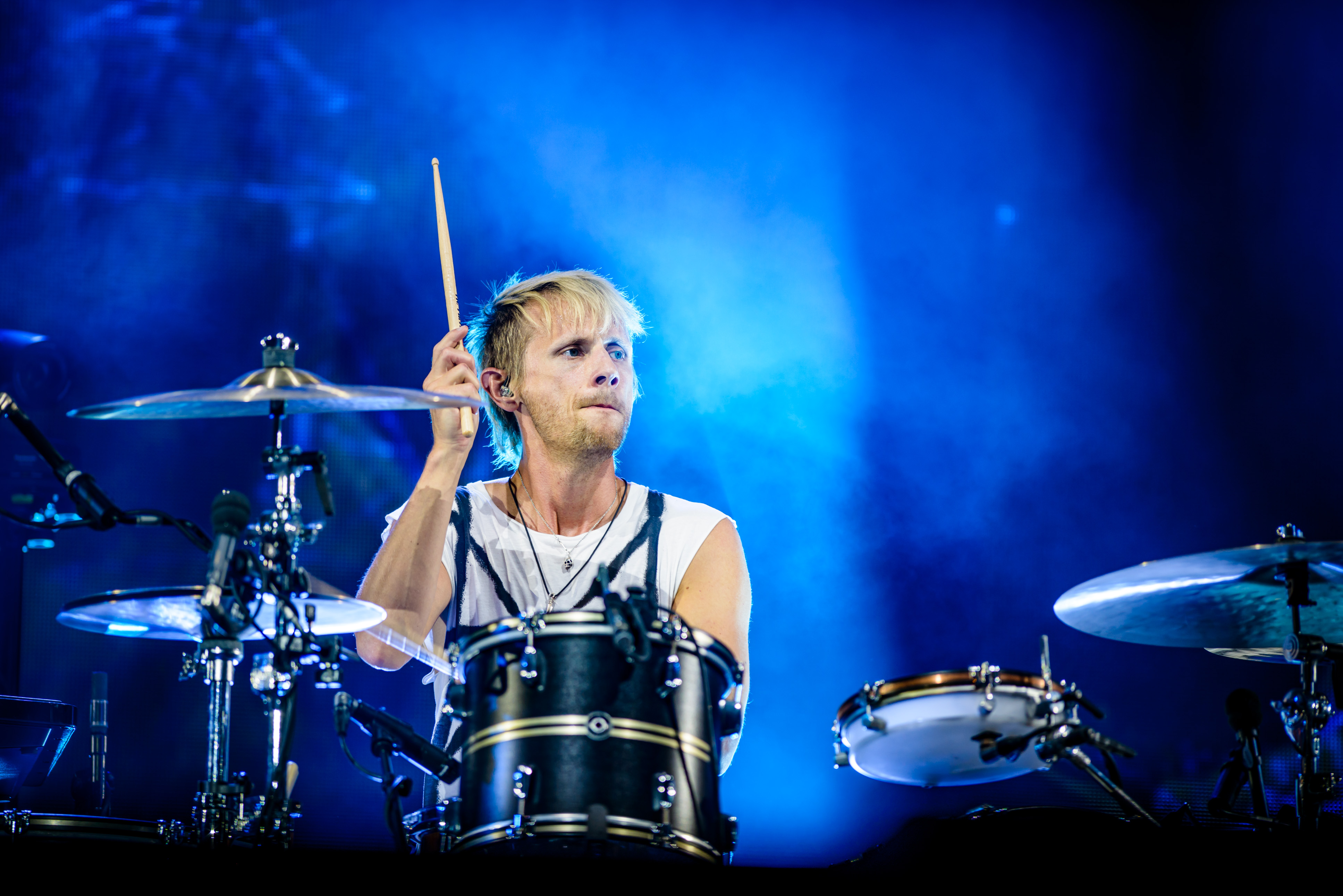
- Howard performing with Muse in 2018

Background information
- Born: Dominic James Howard; 7 December 1977 (age 48); Stockport, Greater Manchester, England
- Genres: Alternative rock; progressive rock; hard rock; art rock; space rock; electronica
- Occupation: Musician
- Instruments: Drums; percussion
- Years active: 1994–present
- Labels: Warner; Mushroom; East West; Helium 3; Taste
- Member of: Muse
- Website: muse.mu

Dominic James Howard (born 7 December 1977) is an English drummer and the co-founder of the rock band Muse.

== Early life ==
Howard was born in Stockport, Greater Manchester, England. His father was a tailor. When he was around eight, his family moved to Teignmouth, Devon. He began playing drums at around the age of 12, when he was inspired by a jazz band performing at school.

== Career ==
Howard met the guitarist Matt Bellamy while their bands rehearsed in the same building. They convinced Chris Wolstenholme to take up bass and start a band, initially called Rocket Baby Dolls. The band was renamed Muse in 1994. Muse have won numerous awards and sold more than 20 million albums worldwide.

Howard uses a left-handed drum kit. He played drums in the supergroup Vicky Cryer, featuring Jason Hill. In 2018, Howard and Bellamy performed as part of the covers band the Jaded Hearts Club with a guest appearance from Paul McCartney. The Dream Theater drummer, Mike Portnoy, cited Howard as an influence, likening his playing to the "groove and power" of Dave Grohl.

== Personal life ==
In 2004, Howard's father, William Howard, died of a heart attack shortly after watching Muse's performance at Glastonbury Festival. On 26 September 2008, Howard, along with Bellamy and Wolstenholme, was awarded an Honorary Doctorate of Arts from the University of Plymouth.
