= Exogenesis: Symphony =

Single by Muse

from the album The Resistance
- Released: 17 April 2010
- Recorded: 2008–09
- Studio: Studio Bellini (Lake Como, Italy)
- Genre: Rock opera
- Length: 4:18 (Part 1 – "Overture"); 3:56 (Part 2 – "Cross-Pollination"); 4:37 (Part 3 – "Redemption"); 12:51 (total length)
- Label: Warner Bros.; Helium-3
- Songwriter: Matt Bellamy
- Producer: Muse

Muse singles chronology
| "Resistance" (2010) | "Exogenesis: Symphony" (2010) | "Neutron Star Collision (Love Is Forever)" (2010) |

"Exogenesis: Symphony", commonly known as simply "Exogenesis", is a composition by English rock band Muse, featured on their 2009 fifth studio album The Resistance. Written by lead vocalist, guitarist and pianist Matt Bellamy over the course of a number of years, the piece is presented as a symphony in three movements entitled "Overture", "Cross-Pollination" and "Redemption", respectively, each occupying a separate track at the end of the album and spanning nearly 13 minutes in total.

"Exogenesis" was released as a single in the United States on 17 April 2010, with 500 copies to be made available by import in the United Kingdom through the band's official website.

== Background ==
A song in the long, symphonic style of "Exogenesis" was first hinted at as a possible inclusion for Muse's fifth studio album in early 2008, when British music magazine NME quoted Bellamy as revealing that "I think on the next album I'd like to do at least one 15-minute space rock solo." This idea was later discussed further and in a more extreme sense, when Bellamy suggested that the band may reject the conventional album format in favour of releasing a series of singles, or indeed "one 50-minute symphony."

As the band confirmed that recording had begun for the album in late 2008, Bellamy explained more about the symphonic song, which he revealed would be in three parts on the album:

There is a new song in three parts, more of a symphony than a song, which I have been working on sporadically for many years [...] As a large percentage of the composition is orchestral, I have never wanted to collaborate with a string arranger as they may make it 'theirs'. So I have been arranging the orchestral elements myself, which is taking a long time. It should hopefully make the next album as the final three tracks.

== Composition and lyrics ==
"Exogenesis: Symphony" has been described as a rock opera in the styles of progressive rock and space rock. Phil Weller of Prog noted it was influenced by both contemporary rock artists, like Radiohead, and classical musicians. Bellamy hinted that it was representative of the direction taken by the band on The Resistance, describing the record as "A symphonic album" and joking that "we'll be knocking on Classic FM's door, you know?"

Speaking for the iTunes LP feature for The Resistance, Bellamy said the following about the inspirations and meanings of "Exogenesis":

["Exogenesis: Symphony"] is influenced by Rachmaninov, Richard Strauss, Chopin and Pink Floyd. It looks at the concept of 'panspermia'. It is a story of humanity coming to an end and everyone pinning their hopes on a group of astronauts who go out to explore space and spread humanity to another planet. Part 1 is a jaded acceptance that civilization will end. Part 2 is a desperate hope that sending the astronauts to find and populate other planets will be successful alongside the recognition that this is the last hope. Finally, Part 3 is when the astronauts realize that it is just one big cycle, and recognize that unless humanity can change it will happen all over again.

== Release ==
On 3 July 2009, Muse revealed, via their Twitter page, the track listing for The Resistance; the "Exogenesis" was shown to occupy the final three tracks of the album, with the three parts being dubbed "Overture", "Cross-Pollination" and "Redemption", respectively. "Exogenesis: Symphony" was released as the fourth and final single from The Resistance on 17 April 2010. Exclusive to the US, it came on a 12" vinyl.

"Exogenesis: Symphony Part I" was used for Dior Homme's advertisement called "A Rendezvous", directed by Guy Ritchie and starring Jude Law and Michaela Kocianova.

== Critical reception ==
The song has been acclaimed by critics. In a pre-release interview with the band, NME identified "Exogenesis" as one of the highlights of the album, describing it as "more bombastic than anything Muse have ever previously done" and revealing that it features "classical piano from Bellamy and a full orchestra throughout." French media source JudeBox reviewed the album before its release, comparing Bellamy's vocal performance to that of Radiohead frontman Thom Yorke and identifying classical composers Frédéric Chopin and Franz Liszt as influences for the symphony. Mojo quoted Bellamy as revealing that the song features an orchestra of over 40 musicians, while NME praised the "classical piece [...] put together by Matthew Bellamy over the course of many years" as the "Most astonishing and over-the-top of all" the songs on The Resistance. The feature article quoted bassist and backing vocalist Chris Wolstenholme as saying the following on the song:

You can always just take the band away from that track and just have the orchestral bit and it would still be beautiful. I just think it's a stunning piece of music and we've never done something like that before, where you've got all these songs that are in different movements. The orchestra were the main bit of the song and the band was more of a backdrop. The strings were at the forefront. It's fucking astonishing.

Drummer Dominic Howard was quoted as adding the following to the description of "Exogenesis":

It's a real journey that song as well. It's kind of... you can't really hear what Matt's singing in the first part much, but the whole song is about leaving the destructive planet we've created, leaving it behind to go populate somewhere else in the universe. So it's a big journey anyway, it's a big kind of filmic, visual journey as well.

== Lawsuit controversy ==
In September 2012, three years after the release of The Resistance and "Exogenesis", Charles Bollfrass claimed that the "Symphony" copied his original cinematic project with the same name. Speaking to a Manhattan court, Bollfrass stated that he had developed a "cinematic science-fiction rock opera" titled "Exogenesis" when he contacted the band in 2005, as well as the rock band System of a Down, to compose the film's original score. The following year, Muse told him they were not interested in pursuing the project, but System of a Down's lead guitarist, Daron Malakian, had said yes, announcing his band's hiatus during an MTV interview. Bollfrass was seeking $3.5 million in damages.

Concerning the lawsuit, Muse stated "The claim is complete nonsense, and is categorically denied. It appears to be based on a 'screenplay' which the band never received or saw, produced by someone the band has never heard of. It speaks volumes that the album in question was released a full three years ago, and yet this is the first that has been heard of these groundless allegations."

The lawsuit was finally dismissed in April 2013 by Judge Louis L. Stanton after an earlier attempt to dismiss had failed in 2012. In dismissing the case, Judge Stanton held that Bollfrass' claims had "practically no legal or factual basis." "The similarity of the two works here lies in their concepts, abstracted to a high degree of generality," Judge Stanton wrote. "Both works are based on a concept of planetary breakdown and space travel, but their treatment is markedly different."

"Bollfrass also said the cover art for "The Resistance" featured an image from the storyboards of his screenplay." But while Judge Stanton tossed the lawsuit, he denied Warner Music's request for attorneys' fees, saying "there was no evidence to conclude that Bollfrass' complaint was frivolous."

== Live performances ==
The symphony is also noted for its live performances; despite the fact that "Cross-Pollination" has not been played live, "Overture" has been performed at virtually every date on The Resistance Tour, besides festival appearances (although it had been played at one or two of the festival slots, this was however rare). "Redemption" was finally played for the first time ever in January 2013 in Saitama, Japan. Live performances during arena dates would usually take place during the first song of the encore set and would involve the band performing on the towers which comprised the arena tour's stage design, as they slowly rose up and blue lighting covered the stage. However, during later dates, the song was sometimes used as the concert opener, although this was rare.

Stadium performances were more notable however, as the band would release a UFO into the crowd whilst the song was being played. The UFO would circle the stadium and, as Matt Bellamy's vocals started, an acrobat in the guise of an alien would drop out of the bottom of the UFO and begin performing acrobatics above the audience. This was also a notable event in Muse's live career, as the band had tried and failed on previous tours to secure a UFO to use in live performances, only to have their plans foiled because of health and safety issues.

== Track listing ==
All tracks are written by Matt Bellamy.

Side A
| No. | Title | Length |
|---|---|---|
| 1. | "Exogenesis: Symphony Part 1 (Overture)" | 4:18 |
| 2. | "Exogenesis: Symphony Part 2 (Cross-Pollination)" | 3:56 |
| 3. | "Exogenesis: Symphony Part 3 (Redemption)" | 4:37 |
| Total length: | | 12:51 |

Side B
| No. | Title | Length |
|---|---|---|
| 1. | "Uprising" (Live from Teignmouth) | 5:37 |
| 2. | "Resistance" (Live from Lisbon) | 5:36 |
| Total length: | | 11:13 |

== In popular culture ==
Exogenesis is a popular choice of music in figure skating. Many high-profile skaters such as Kamila Valieva, Evgenia Medvedeva, Amber Glenn, Ashley Wagner, and ice dance pair Charlène Guignard and Marco Fabbri have skated to it.
