= A Seaside Rendezvous =

2009 concert tour by Muse

- Homecoming tour by Muse
- Promotional poster for the concerts
- Location: The Den, Teignmouth
- Associated album: The Resistance
- Start date: 4 September 2009
- End date: 5 September 2009
- No. of shows: 2

Muse concert chronology
- Black Holes and Revelations Tour (2006–08); A Seaside Rendezvous (2009); The Resistance Tour (2009–11)

A Seaside Rendezvous was a 2009 pair of concerts by English rock band Muse. Held at The Den in Teignmouth, Devon, the town in which the band's members spent their childhoods and began their musical careers, the homecoming concerts were the band's first shows in the town for 15 years. It is believed that the name 'Seaside Rendezvous' was taken from the Queen song of the same name (Queen being a major influence on the band).

== Background ==
The planning of two Teignmouth concerts was first revealed by locals newspapers the Teignmouth Post and Herald Express on 7 and 8 August 2009. It was rumoured that the concert's promoters, SJM Concerts Ltd., had applied to Teignbridge District Council for permission to hold the concerts at The Den, though it was recognised that there were concerns. With the dates planned as 4 and 5 September 2009, support for the shows quickly increased and spread across the country. A band spokesperson was quoted as describing the band as "very keen" to complete the gigs, with locals describing it as "an iconic event." A council meeting was held on the morning of 17 August in Newton Abbot to decide whether the shows would go ahead. Muse bassist Chris Wolstenholme attended the meeting and urged fans to show their support.

On 17 August, the two concerts were confirmed after the meeting council allowed so. Wolstenholme told the Herald Express's reporter Emma Pearcy after the meeting "I am chuffed to bits the application has been granted. What I have been really surprised by is how much support we have been getting, from a huge range of people. Obviously we will do what we can to make sure complaints are kept to a minimum." The bassist added that "It is something we have wanted to do for a long time. It is not a money making exercise. We want to give something back to the community." BBC Radio 1 presenter Zane Lowe aired highlights from the Saturday 5 September performance on his radio show on 7 September 2009.

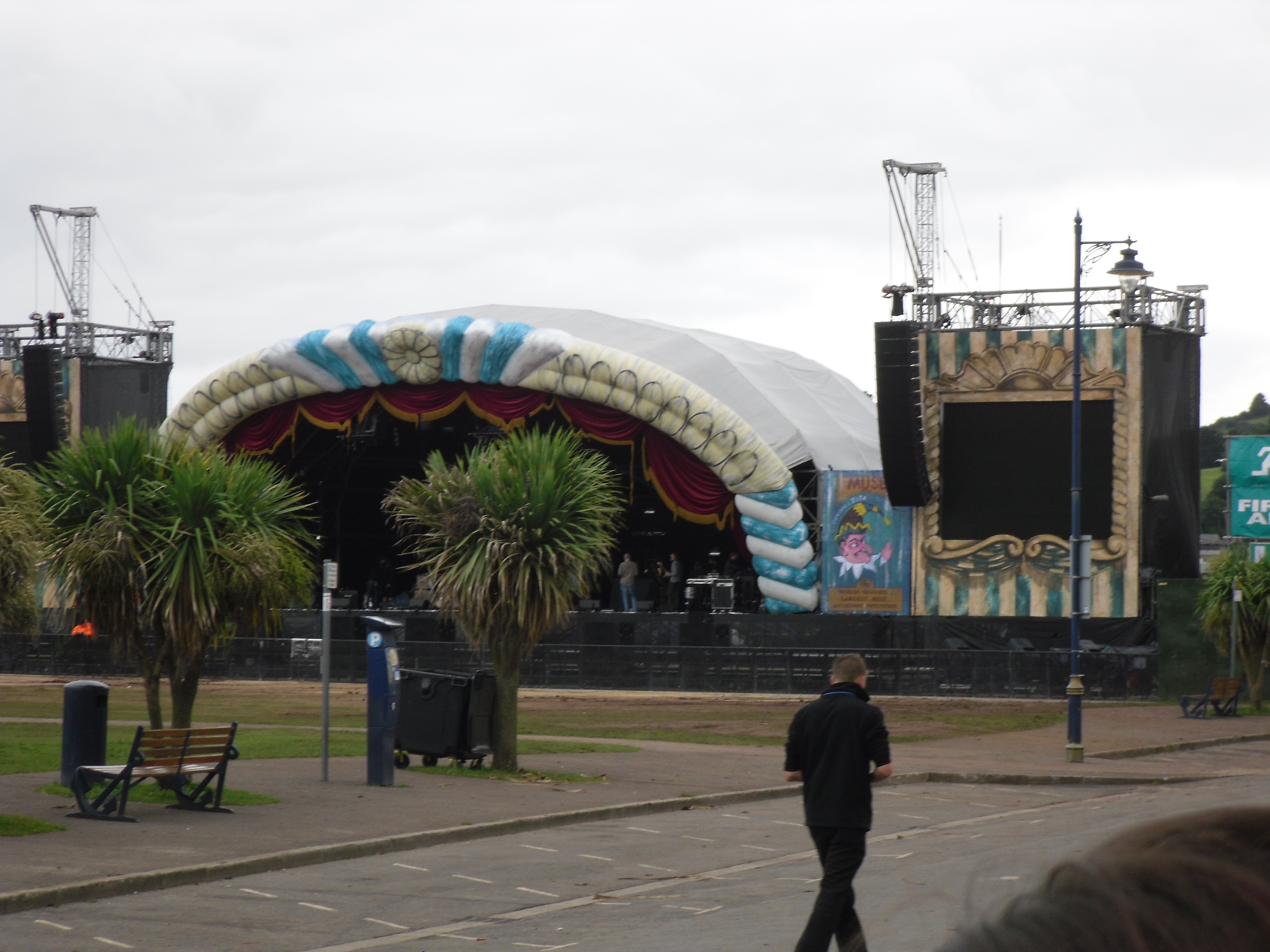
The stage at The Den before the second show of the weekend.

"A Seaside Rendezvous" was confirmed on Muse's official website on 18 August, along with ticket and travel information; general sale opens on 21 August, with a fans' pre-sale on 19 August. The concerts were approved on the basis that "a maximum noise level of 84.1dB(A)" be produced. Despite tickets going on sale from 19 August, the shows still have to be approved by the landowner of The Den. In an interview with American radio station 107.7 The End shortly after gaining approval for the concerts, lead vocalist, guitarist and pianist Matt Bellamy, speaking from Teignmouth, revealed that they had to overcome a lot of problems with the organisation of the shows, including having to negotiate with the local police force and fire brigade.

In an interview with music website Drowned in Sound, drummer Dominic Howard explained that "Playing in Teignmouth is going to be amazing, we're all really looking forward to it," adding "It's honestly something we've always wanted to do since the day that I met Matt [Bellamy] at The Den. It's not a park, it's just like a big piece of grass. That's where I met Matt for the first time. I remember even in those early days talking to Matt and saying things like 'wouldn't [sic] be great to play a proper gig on here with shitloads of people!" Howard also revealed that support acts would be local bands, including Hey Molly, with whom bassist Wolstenholme is "quite friendly," The Quails and "two more local bands." The concerts drew up to 15,000 fans to Teignmouth each night of that weekend and were said to have "given [Teignmouth's] economy a much welcomed boost," with all available accommodation being booked in addition to the numerous merchandise and food and drink facilities made available.

On 11 and 12 September 2009, BBC Three broadcast a documentary about the event and the band's childhood life, growing up in Teignmouth.

== Reception ==
The concerts in Teignmouth were largely well-received, with English newspapers The Guardian, The Daily Telegraph, The Times and The Independent all awarding the shows at least four out of a maximum five rating stars. The Guardian praised the performances as reaffirming the Teignmouth-held "intoxicating truth" that Muse "are now so ridiculous that they have become sublime." Neil McCormick of The Daily Telegraph described the shows as "a triumphant open-air concert," while The Times spoke highly of the band's tribute to their hometown and the first performances of material from The Resistance. The Independent's Chris Mugan was similarly positive, explaining how "in performance [...] Muse emerge as one of [Britain's] most uninhibited bands."

== Set list ==
First show

Main set:

1. "Uprising"
2. "Supermassive Black Hole"
3. "Stockholm Syndrome"
4. "Resistance"
5. "Hysteria"
6. "New Born"
7. "Map of the Problematique"
8. "United States of Eurasia"
9. "Cave"
10. "Popcorn" (Gershon Kingsley cover)
11. "Starlight"
12. "Undisclosed Desires"
13. "Time Is Running Out"
14. "Unnatural Selection"

Encore:

15. "Plug In Baby"
16. "Man With A Harmonica" (Ennio Morricone cover) + "Knights of Cydonia"

Second show

Main set:

1. "Uprising"
2. "Map of the Problematique"
3. "Supermassive Black Hole"
4. "Resistance"
5. "Hysteria"
6. "New Born"
7. "United States of Eurasia"
8. "Feeling Good"
9. "Cave"
10. "Popcorn" (Gershon Kingsley cover)
11. "Starlight"
12. "Undisclosed Desires"
13. "Time Is Running Out"
14. "Unnatural Selection"

Encore:

15. "Stockholm Syndrome"
16. "Plug In Baby"
17. "Man With a Harmonica" (Ennio Morricone cover) + "Knights of Cydonia"

== Personnel ==
- Matt Bellamy – lead vocals; guitar; piano on "New Born", "United States of Eurasia", "Cave" and "Feeling Good"; keytar on "Undisclosed Desires"
- Chris Wolstenholme – bass, backing vocals, headless bass on "Uprising" and "Unnatural Selection", harmonica on "Man With a Harmonica"
- Dominic Howard – drums, backing vocals on "Supermassive Black Hole"
- Morgan Nicholls – keyboards, synthesizers, backing vocals, percussion, brief guitar on "United States of Eurasia".

== Notes ==
1. "Man With a Harmonica", originally composed by Ennio Morricone for the Once Upon a Time in the West soundtrack, was performed as an introduction to "Knights of Cydonia" at both shows.
