= Susan Wolf =

Susan Wolf may refer to:

- Susan M. Wolf (fl. since 1982), American lawyer and bioethicist
- Susan R. Wolf (born 1952), American moral philosopher and philosopher of action
