= Donovan v. Bierwirth =

- Court: United States Court of Appeals for the Second Circuit
- Full case name: Raymond J. Donovan, Secretary of the United States Department of Labor v. John C. Bierwirth, Robert G. Freese and Carl A. Paladino
- Argued: March 19, 1982
- Decided: May 10, 1982
- Citations: 680 F.2d 263; 64 A.L.R.Fed. 580; 3 Employee Benefits Cas. 1417

Case history
- Prior history: 538 F. Supp. 463 (E.D.N.Y. 1981)
- Subsequent history: Cert. denied, 459 U.S. 1069 (1982).

Court membership
- Judges sitting: Henry Friendly, Lawrence W. Pierce, Charles M. Metzner

Case opinions
- Majority: Friendly, joined by unanimous

Laws applied
- Employee Retirement Income Security Act (ERISA), 29 U.S.C. §§ 1104–1106

Keywords
- Wages

Donovan v. Bierwirth, 680 F.2d 263 (2d Cir. 1982), is a US labor law case, concerning the fiduciary duty owed to an employee benefit plan governed by the Employee Retirement Income Security Act (ERISA).

== Facts ==
The Secretary of Labor claimed that trustees of the Grumman Corporation Pension Plan breached a fiduciary duty in §§ 1104(a) and 1106(b) by not tendering stock when LTV launched a takeover bid of Grumman Corp, and also by buying more shares.

== Judgment ==
For the Second Circuit, Judge Friendly held that faced with a conflict of interest, a fiduciary is expected to obtain independent counsel and perhaps to suspend his or her service as fiduciary for a time.

We are not, however, required to go so far in this case. The record contains specific instances of the trustees’ failure to observe the high standard of duty placed upon them. Bierwirth and Freese should have been immediately aware of the difficult position which they occupied as a result of having decided as directors some of the same questions they would have to decide as trustees, and should have explored where their duty lay. Instead the question of a trustees' meeting was treated quite casually-something to be attended to when the hectic pace of fighting the tender offer would permit. One way for the trustees to inform themselves would have been to solicit the advice of independent counsel; Mullan, a junior Grumman employee, was under disabilities similar to those of the trustees themselves. He could hardly have been expected to tell the trustees that the better course would be to resign or even to suggest investigations which might alter the judgment of total commitment to defeating the LTV offer that management had already expressed. We do not mean by this either that trustees confronted with a difficult decision need always engage independent counsel or that engaging such counsel and following their advice will operate as a complete whitewash which, without more, satisfies ERISA's prudence requirement. But this was, and should have been perceived to be, an unusual situation peculiarly requiring legal advice from someone above the battle.... We need not decide whether even this would have sufficed; perhaps, after the events of late September, resignation was the only proper course. It is enough that, for the reasons we have indicated, as well as others, the district judge was warranted in concluding, on the materials before him, that the trustees had not measured up to the high standards imposed by § 404(a)(1)(A) and (B) of ERISA.

Judges Pierce and Metzner concurred.

== See also ==
- United States labor law
