= The Resistance Tour =

2009–11 concert tour by Muse

- Promotional tour by Muse
- Location: Europe, North America, South America, Asia, Australasia
- Associated album: The Resistance
- Start date: 22 October 2009
- End date: 28 August 2011
- Legs: 7
- No. of shows: 139

Muse concert chronology
- A Seaside Rendezvous (2009); The Resistance Tour (2009–11); The 2nd Law World Tour (2012–14)

The Resistance Tour was a worldwide concert tour by English rock band Muse in support of their fifth studio album The Resistance. The opening European leg began on 22 October 2009 and ended on 4 December 2009, comprising 30 shows. The second leg, which began on 7 January 2010, included thirteen shows, seven of which were part of the Australasian Big Day Out shows. A North American leg of 26 shows took place in early 2010. Nine stadium shows took place in Europe in 2010, with three of those dates taking place at Wembley Stadium and Old Trafford Cricket Ground. A second round of North American concerts took place throughout September and October 2010. These dates focused on secondary markets and other areas not previously hit on the tour. A return to Australasia took place throughout December 2010 and Muse are confirmed as openers for U2's 360° Tour dates in South America in spring 2011 and also played further European shows in the summer of 2011. At the conclusion of 2010, the tour was placed on Pollstar's annual "Year End Top 50 Worldwide Concert Tours", and appeared 13th worldwide, earning over $76 million with 64 shows in 2010.

== Background ==
A promotional tour was first confirmed by Muse in March 2009 when they announced that "We are pleased to confirm that Muse will be touring in the UK, Europe and North America this autumn." In June 2009, the band confirmed the dates for an opening European leg of "The Resistance Tour", which they announced would comprise 30 shows. Tickets for the shows in the United Kingdom, Sweden and France went on sale from 5 June, while tickets for other European dates went on fan pre-sale between 11 June (Netherlands) and 17 June (Spain). Tickets for the UK arena dates, both pre-sale and general sale, sold out within minutes of going on sale. On 22 September 2009, it was announced that extra tickets for many of the European concerts would be sold beginning on 24 September.

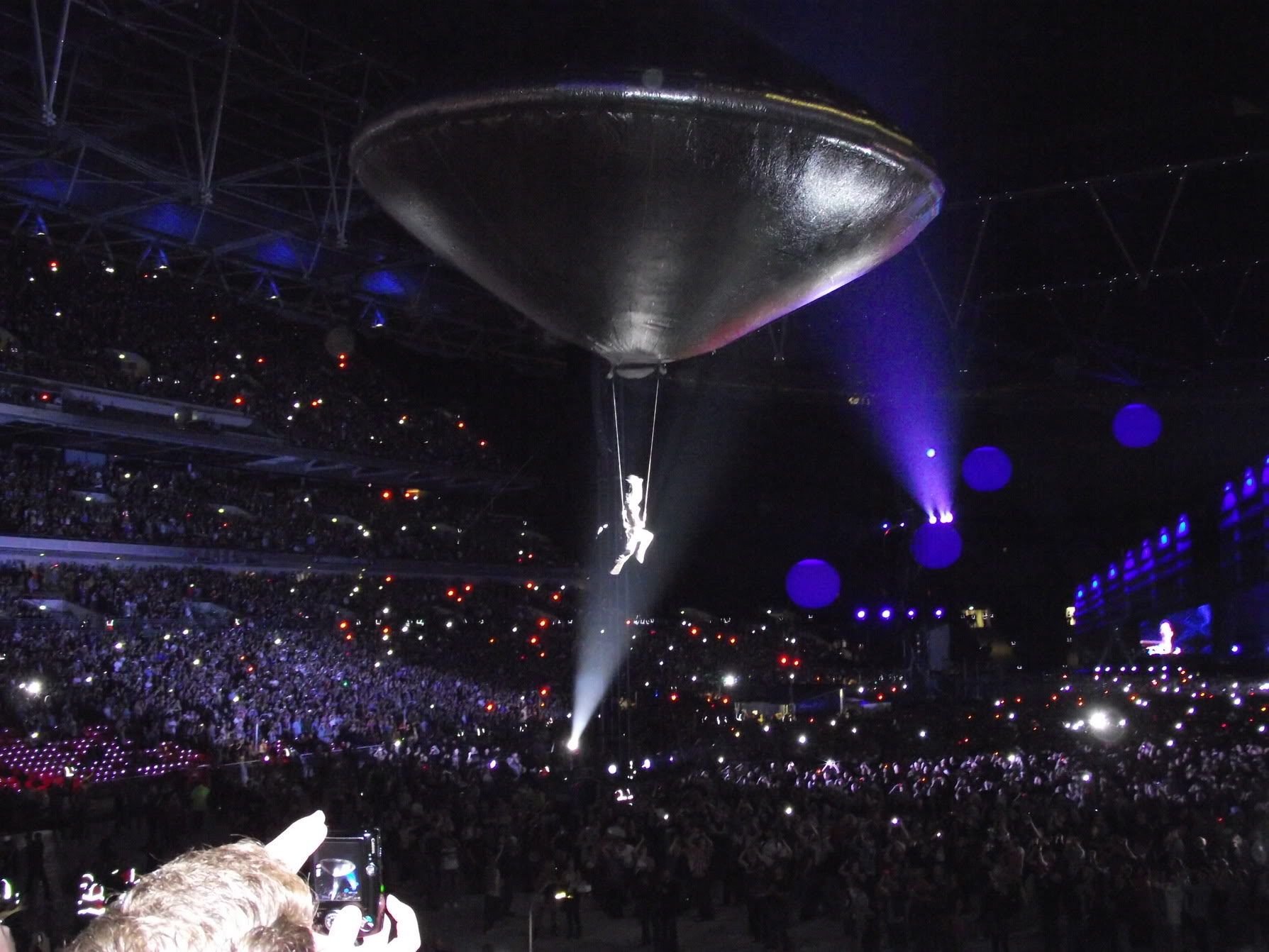
Muse performing "Exogenesis: Symphony Part 1 (Overture)" on Wembley Stadium, London.

=== Warm-up shows ===
On 18 August 2009, a duo of concerts collectively entitled "A Seaside Rendezvous" was confirmed for 4 and 5 September. The concerts were the first in the band's childhood hometown of Teignmouth, Devon in over ten years, as well as the first shows since the band's appearance at V Festival in August 2008 and since the completion of The Resistance. The performances included the debut appearances of five songs from the upcoming album, including lead single "Uprising", "Undisclosed Desires" and title track "Resistance".

The band also performed a small number of shows at other venues in Europe, before they supported Irish rock band U2 for nine dates on the North American leg of their 360° Tour in September and October and in South America in March and April 2011.

Date	City	Country	Venue
A Seaside Rendezvous
4 September 2009	Teignmouth	England	The Den
5 September 2009	Teignmouth	England	The Den
Warm-Up Shows
7 September 2009	Berlin	Germany	Admiralspalast
8 September 2009	Paris	France	Théâtre du Châtelet
13 September 2009	New York City	United States	Walter Kerr Theatre
U2 360° Tour
24 September 2009	East Rutherford	United States	Giants Stadium
25 September 2009	East Rutherford	United States	Giants Stadium
29 September 2009	Landover	United States	FedExField
1 October 2009	Charlottesville	United States	Scott Stadium
3 October 2009	Raleigh	United States	Carter–Finley Stadium
6 October 2009	Atlanta	United States	Georgia Dome
9 October 2009	Tampa	United States	Raymond James Stadium
12 October 2009	Arlington	United States	Cowboys Stadium
14 October 2009	Houston	United States	Reliant Stadium
25 March 2011	Santiago	Chile	Estadio Nacional de Chile
30 March 2011	La Plata	Argentina	Estadio Ciudad de La Plata
2 April 2011	La Plata	Argentina	Estadio Ciudad de La Plata
3 April 2011	La Plata	Argentina	Estadio Ciudad de La Plata
9 April 2011	São Paulo	Brazil	Estádio do Morumbi
10 April 2011	São Paulo	Brazil	Estádio do Morumbi
13 April 2011	São Paulo	Brazil	Estádio do Morumbi

== Design and setup ==
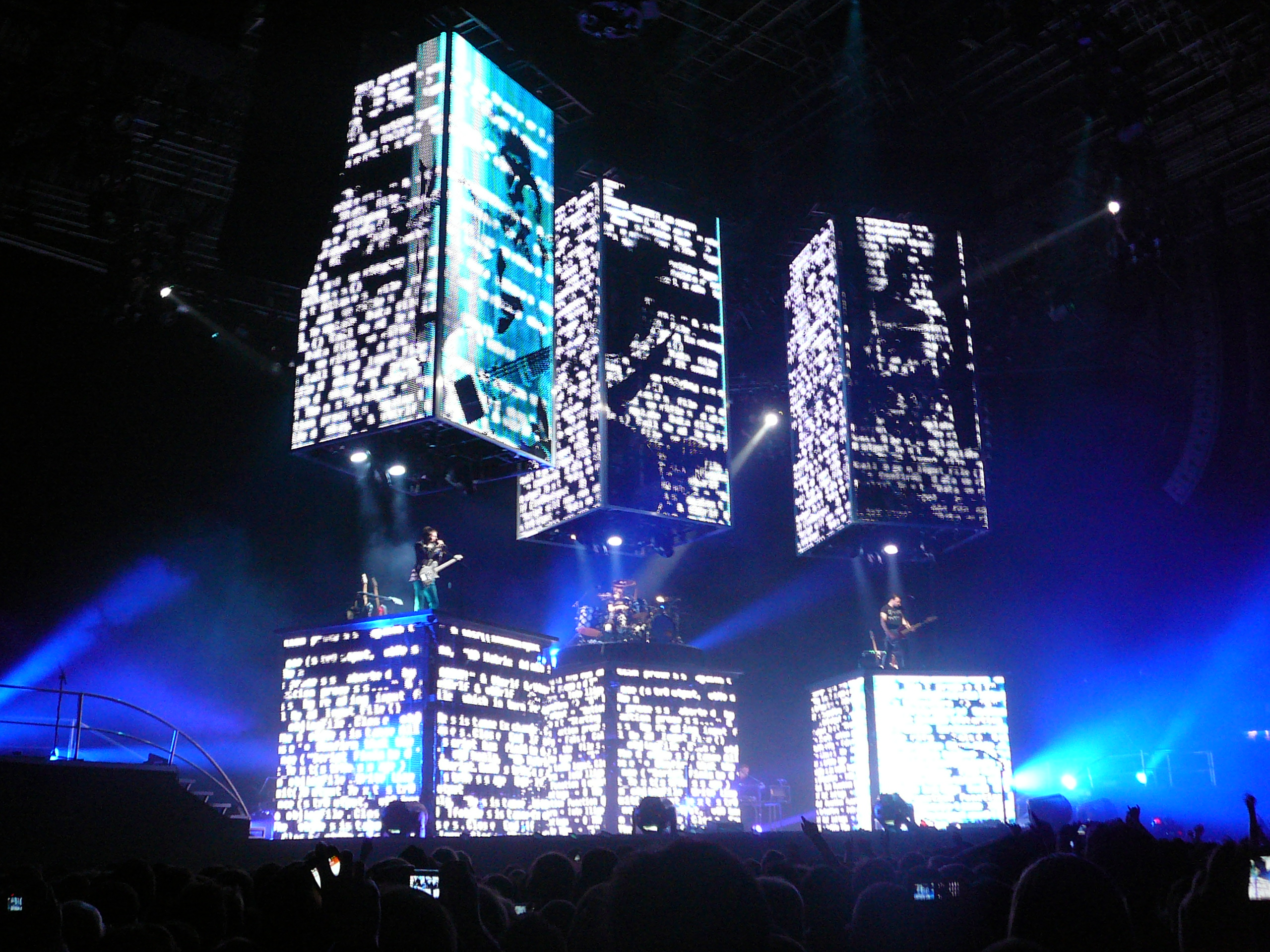
Muse performing Resistance at the Birmingham NIA.

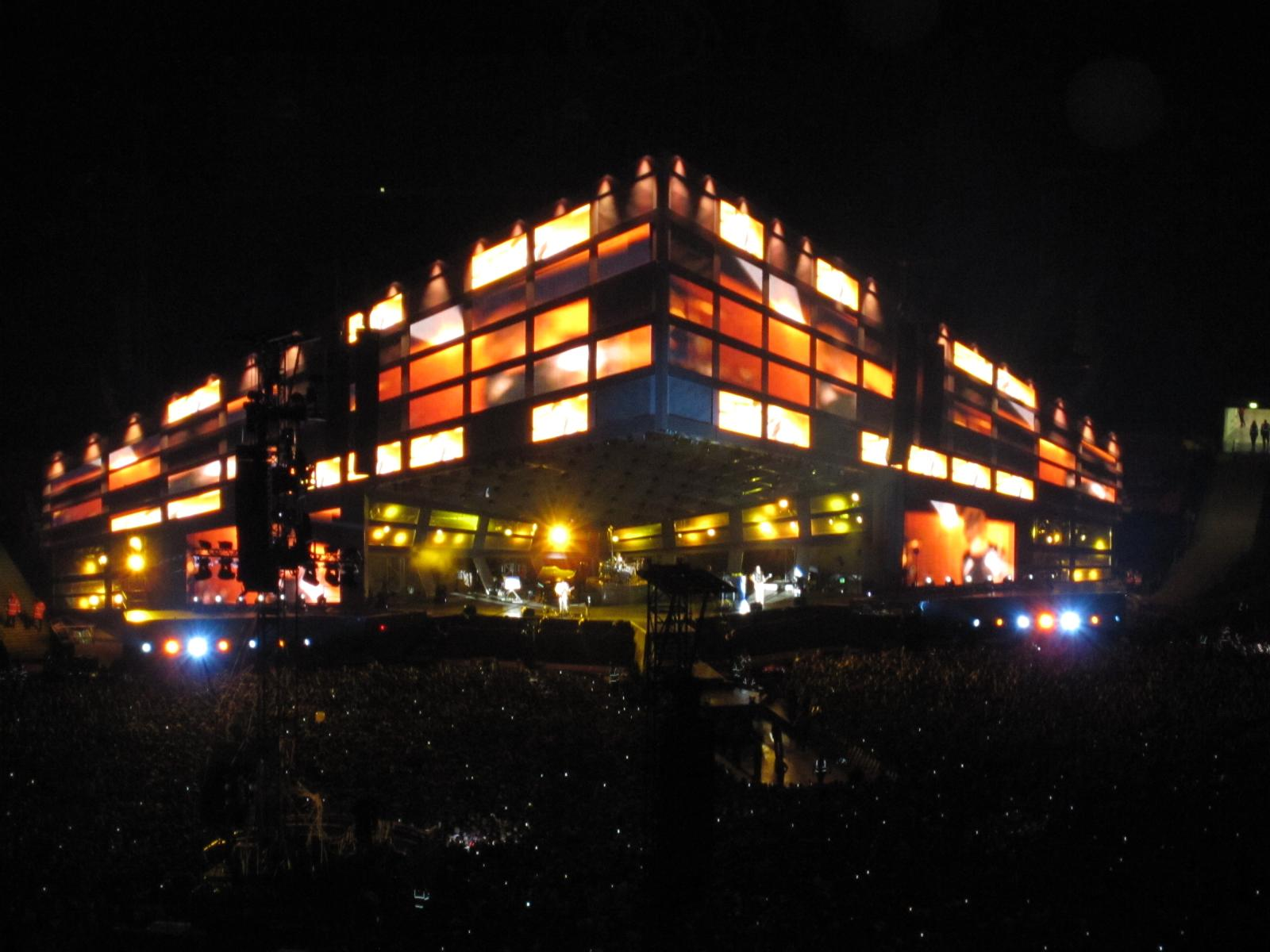
Muse performing at Wembley Stadium using the triangular stage.

In revealing news of the tour, music magazine NME quoted the band as saying "We are coming up with a different and exciting stage set and production which will encompass our fans", suggesting that the stage will be placed in the middle of each arena, with the audience surrounding the band, a technique first used by prog-rock band Yes in 1978. On 22 July, via their Twitter page, the band revealed that they were "working on set design", hinting at fans to "Expect an 8" stone 'enge"." In September 2009, the BBC quoted drummer Dominic Howard as revealing that the band members will "be on these three pillars moving up and down", adding that "There might be a loose narrative that we're trapped in some kind of institution and we're trying to break out of it", which he promises will "look impressive." Music website Drowned in Sound also spoke to Howard, publishing the following quotes regarding stage setup:

There's going to be some good video usage. We're going to be on some big moving LED structures, so we're all going to be moving up and down at different levels and actually playing quite high up in the air, which is something we've never done. We're going to be on these floating cubes of video *laughs maniacally*. Individual cubes, all like moving around. They're like massive towers and there's three of them with lots of video. [...] I think we're going to be doing a few shows where we're going to have fans all around us. Not in the middle of the room but we've designed the stage in a way so that the crowd can fit all around us. Everyone's going to have a great view and get the whole show, even if you're sitting behind us, not just the back of our heads. There's going to be lots of spinning around and stuff like that. [...] Most of our ideas get shot down by health and safety and it starts out much more ambitious than it ends up being but we're always trying to push it to the limits of the laws.

For the stadium performances, the band changed the set design completely. Like the arena tour, the design was based on the book 1984 by George Orwell but this time the new design featured the band on a triangular-pyramid shaped stage. The stage was designed and built by the Belgian company Stageco (who also designed the stage for U2's 360° Tour). It features a ball on the top which is said to be the "All Seeing Eye" from the book 1984. On the pyramid itself there are separated blocks, with most of them being screens which project animations and also turn inside out occasionally. There is a catwalk-like structure leading from the front of the stage into the crowd, with an elephant lift at the end which moves 10m in the air and 15m forward, with space for 3 people. This so-called elephant lift would rise into the air and over the audience during performances of Undisclosed Desires and Take a Bow (the latter of which involved frontman Matt Bellamy wearing an LED suit). During performances of "Exogenesis Symphony: Part I – Overture" a U.F.O is released into the crowd with an acrobat hanging from the rear of it reaching for the people. However this has not been used in all stadium performances.

The band's festival performances have been different from both these stage performances. For the shows in Australasia in early 2010 and the headline appearance at Coachella the band used 3 video strips in a similar arrangement to the top halves of the pillars but on the back wall of the stage. The festival stage was redesigned for the 2010 European festival shows with 3 groups of hexagonal video screens on the back wall of the stage and different visuals to those used earlier in the year for some songs, although for one show in Latvia and two shows in Asia Muse used only one solo screen. Also on one occasion, the UFO was used, in Germany. For the band's headlining set at Glastonbury Festival 2010, U2 guitarist The Edge was invited on stage to play "Where The Streets Have No Name" with Muse, seeing as U2 had cancelled their planned slot for the previous day due to Bono's back injury from rehearsals weeks earlier.

== Tour dates ==
Date	City	Country	Venue	Support	S
First Leg: Europe I & US Festivals
Europe
22 October 2009	Helsinki	Finland	Hartwall Arena	None	1
24 October 2009	Stockholm	Sweden	Hovet	The Horrors	2
25 October 2009	Oslo	Norway	Oslo Spektrum	The Horrors	3
26 October 2009	Copenhagen	Denmark	Parken Stadium	The Horrors	4
28 October 2009	Hamburg	Germany	Color Line Arena	The Horrors	4
29 October 2009	Berlin	Germany	O2 World	The Horrors	3
31 October 2009	Liévin	France	Stade Couvert Régional	The Horrors	4
1 November 2009	Amnéville	France	Galaxie Amnéville	The Horrors	5
2 November 2009	Antwerp	Belgium	Sportpaleis	The Horrors	6
4 November 2009	Sheffield	England	Sheffield Arena	The Big Pink	6
5 November 2009	Liverpool	England	Echo Arena Liverpool	The Big Pink	5
6 November 2009	Dublin	Ireland	The O2	None	6
9 November 2009	Glasgow	Scotland	SECC	The Big Pink	7
10 November 2009	Birmingham	England	National Indoor Arena	The Big Pink	8
12 November 2009	London	England	The O2 Arena	The Big Pink	9
13 November 2009	London	England	The O2 Arena	The Big Pink	10
14 November 2009	Rotterdam	Netherlands	Rotterdam Ahoy	Biffy Clyro	11
16 November 2009	Cologne	Germany	Lanxess Arena	Biffy Clyro	11
17 November 2009	Paris	France	Palais Omnisports de Paris-Bercy	Biffy Clyro	10
18 November 2009	Zürich	Switzerland	Hallenstadion	Biffy Clyro	11
20 November 2009	Munich	Germany	Olympiahalle	Biffy Clyro	11
21 November 2009	Bologna	Italy	Futurshow Station	Biffy Clyro	10
22 November 2009	Lyon	France	Halle Tony Garnier	Biffy Clyro	11
24 November 2009	Barcelona	Spain	Palau Sant Jordi	Biffy Clyro	12
25 November 2009	Toulouse	France	Le Zénith	Biffy Clyro	13
28 November 2009	Madrid	Spain	Palacio de Deportes	Biffy Clyro	12
29 November 2009	Lisbon	Portugal	Pavilhão Atlântico	Biffy Clyro	11
1 December 2009	Limoges	France	Le Zénith	Biffy Clyro	14
2 December 2009	Dijon	France	Le Zénith	Biffy Clyro	15
4 December 2009	Turin	Italy	Torino Palasport Olimpico	Biffy Clyro	16
US Holiday Festivals
11 December 2009	Oakland	United States	Oracle Arena	Various	17
12 December 2009	Las Vegas	United States	The Joint	Various	18
13 December 2009	Los Angeles	United States	Gibson Amphitheatre	Various	19
15 December 2009	Seattle	United States	WaMu Theater	Various	20
Second Leg: Asia/Australasia
East Asia
7 January 2010	Seoul	South Korea	Olympic Park	None	21
9 January 2010	Osaka	Japan	Osaka-jō Hall	None	22
11 January 2010	Nagoya	Japan	Aichi Prefectural Gymnasium	None	23
12 January 2010	Tokyo	Japan	Nippon Budokan	None	24
Australia
15 January 2010	Auckland	New Zealand	Big Day Out	Various	25
17 January 2010	Gold Coast	Australia	Big Day Out	Various	26
22 January 2010	Sydney	Australia	Big Day Out	Various	27
23 January 2010	Sydney	Australia	Big Day Out	Various	28
26 January 2010	Melbourne	Australia	Big Day Out	Various	29
29 January 2010	Adelaide	Australia	Big Day Out	Various	30
31 January 2010	Perth	Australia	Big Day Out	Various	31
3 February 2010	Singapore	Singapore	Singapore Indoor Stadium	Saosin, Rise Against	32
6 February 2010	Hong Kong	Hong Kong	AsiaWorld–Expo	None	33
Third Leg: North America I
27 February 2010	Duluth	United States	Arena at Gwinnett Center	Silversun Pickups	34
1 March 2010	Fairfax	United States	Patriot Center	Silversun Pickups	35
2 March 2010	Philadelphia	United States	Wachovia Center	Silversun Pickups	35
3 March 2010	Baltimore	United States	1st Mariner Arena	Silversun Pickups	36
5 March 2010	New York City	United States	Madison Square Garden	Silversun Pickups	37
6 March 2010	Boston	United States	TD Garden	Silversun Pickups	35
8 March 2010	Toronto	Canada	Air Canada Centre	Silversun Pickups	35
10 March 2010	Montreal	Canada	Bell Centre	Silversun Pickups	35
12 March 2010	Chicago	United States	United Center	Silversun Pickups	38
13 March 2010	Auburn Hills	United States	The Palace of Auburn Hills	Silversun Pickups	39
15 March 2010	Nashville	United States	Bridgestone Arena	Silversun Pickups	39
17 March 2010	Fort Worth	United States	Fort Worth Convention Center	Silversun Pickups	39
18 March 2010	Houston	United States	Toyota Center	Silversun Pickups	38
19 March 2010	Austin	United States	Stubb's (South by Southwest)	Metric	40
29 March 2010	Edmonton	Canada	Rexall Place	Silversun Pickups	41
30 March 2010	Calgary	Canada	Pengrowth Saddledome	Silversun Pickups	42
1 April 2010	Vancouver	Canada	Pacific Coliseum	Silversun Pickups	43
2 April 2010	Seattle	United States	KeyArena	Silversun Pickups	44
3 April 2010	Portland	United States	Rose Garden Arena	Silversun Pickups	45
5 April 2010	West Valley City	United States	E Center	Silversun Pickups	43
9 April 2010	Phoenix	United States	US Airways Center	Silversun Pickups	45
10 April 2010	Las Vegas	United States	Mandalay Bay Events Center	Silversun Pickups	43
11 April 2010	Tucson	United States	KFMA Day	Various	46
14 April 2010	Oakland	United States	Oracle Arena	Silversun Pickups	47
17 April 2010	Indio	United States	Coachella Valley Music and Arts Festival	Various	48
20 April 2010	Mexico City	Mexico	Foro Sol	Rey Pila	47
Fourth Leg: Festivals & Stadiums
Europe II
25 May 2010	Paris	France	Casino de Paris	None	49
27 May 2010	Lisbon	Portugal	Rock in Rio	Various	50
2 June 2010	Bern	Switzerland	Stade de Suisse	Editors, The Big Pink	51
5 June 2010	Nürburg	Germany	Rock am Ring	Various	52
6 June 2010	Nuremberg	Germany	Rock im Park	Various	53
8 June 2010	Milan	Italy	San Siro	Kasabian, Friendly Fires, Calibro 35	54
11 June 2010	Saint-Denis	France	Stade de France	Editors, The Big Pink, I Am Arrows	55
12 June 2010	Saint-Denis	France	Stade de France	Kasabian, White Lies, DeVotchKa	56
16 June 2010	Madrid	Spain	Vicente Calderón Stadium	Editors, The Big Pink	57
19 June 2010	Nijmegen	Netherlands	Goffertpark	Editors, Ghinzu	58
26 June 2010	Pilton	England	Glastonbury Festival	Various	59
29 June 2010	Arendal	Norway	Hove Festival	Various	60
1 July 2010	Werchter	Belgium	Rock Werchter	Various	61
3 July 2010	Roskilde	Denmark	Roskilde Festival	Various	62
5 July 2010	Hradec Králové	Czech Republic	Rock for People	Various	63
9 July 2010	Kinross	Scotland	T in the Park	Various	64
10 July 2010	Naas	Ireland	Oxegen	Various	65
15 July 2010	Carhaix-Plouguer	France	Vieilles Charrues Festival	Various	66
17 July 2010	Salacgrīva	Latvia	Positivus Festival	Various	67
19 July 2010	Helsinki	Finland	Kaisaniemi Park	White Lies, Manna	68
23 July 2010	Bergen	Norway	Koengen	White Lies, Magnet	68
Asia II
30 July 2010	Niigata	Japan	Fuji Rock Festival	Various	69
1 August 2010	Icheon	South Korea	Jisan Valley Rock Festival	Various	70
Europe III
15 August 2010	Budapest	Hungary	Sziget Festival	Various	71
19 August 2010	Sankt Pölten	Austria	Frequency Festival	Various	72
21 August 2010	Kraków	Poland	Coke Live Music Festival	Various	73
27 August 2010	Santiago de Compostela	Spain	Festival Xacobeo	Various	74
4 September 2010	Manchester	England	Old Trafford Cricket Ground	Editors, Band of Skulls, Pulled Apart by Horses	75
10 September 2010	London	England	Wembley Stadium	Lily Allen, The Big Pink, White Rabbits	76
11 September 2010	London	England	Wembley Stadium	Biffy Clyro, White Lies, I Am Arrows	77
Fifth Leg: North America II
22 September 2010	San Diego	United States	Viejas Arena	Passion Pit	78
23 September 2010	Anaheim	United States	Honda Center	Passion Pit	79
25 September 2010	Los Angeles	United States	Staples Center	Passion Pit	80
26 September 2010	Los Angeles	United States	Staples Center	Passion Pit	81
28 September 2010	Sacramento	United States	ARCO Arena	Passion Pit	82
1 October 2010	Rio Rancho	United States	Santa Ana Star Center	Passion Pit	82
2 October 2010	Denver	United States	Pepsi Center	Passion Pit	83
5 October 2010	Minneapolis	United States	Target Center	Passion Pit	84
6 October 2010	Milwaukee	United States	Bradley Center	Passion Pit	85
8 October 2010	Oklahoma City	United States	Ford Center	Passion Pit	86
9 October 2010	Austin	United States	Austin City Limits Music Festival	Various	87
11 October 2010	Cincinnati	United States	U.S. Bank Arena	Metric	88
12 October 2010	Columbus	United States	Value City Arena	Metric	89
21 October 2010	Quebec City	Canada	Colisée Pepsi	Metric	90
23 October 2010	Uniondale	United States	Nassau Coliseum	Metric	90
24 October 2010	Newark	United States	Prudential Center	Metric	91
26 October 2010	Raleigh	United States	RBC Center	Metric	92
27 October 2010	Charlottesville	United States	John Paul Jones Arena	Metric	93
29 October 2010	New Orleans	United States	Voodoo Experience	Various	94
Sixth Leg: Australia II
5 December 2010	Brisbane	Australia	Brisbane Entertainment Centre	Dead Letter Circus	90
6 December 2010	Brisbane	Australia	Brisbane Entertainment Centre	Dead Letter Circus	95
9 December 2010	Sydney	Australia	Acer Arena	Biffy Clyro	96
10 December 2010	Sydney	Australia	Acer Arena	Biffy Clyro	97
14 December 2010	Melbourne	Australia	Rod Laver Arena	Biffy Clyro	96
15 December 2010	Melbourne	Australia	Rod Laver Arena	Biffy Clyro	97
19 December 2010	Perth	Australia	Bassendean Oval	Biffy Clyro	98
Seventh Leg: 2011 tour
Eastern Europe
20 May 2011	Saint Petersburg	Russia	Saint-Petersburg Sports and Concert Complex	We Are Scientists	
22 May 2011	Moscow	Russia	Olympic Stadium	We Are Scientists	
24 May 2011	Kyiv	Ukraine	Palace of Sports	We Are Scientists	
Festivals (Origin of Symmetry Tenth Anniversary)
30 July 2011	Los Angeles	United States	Los Angeles Memorial Coliseum (L.A. Rising)	Various	
3 August 2011	Noblesville	United States	Verizon Wireless Music Center	Cage the Elephant, Middle Class Rut	
5 August 2011	Chicago	United States	Lollapalooza	Various	
6 August 2011	Kansas City	United States	Kanrocksas Music Festival	Various	
13 August 2011	San Francisco	United States	Outside Lands Music and Arts Festival	Various	
26 August 2011	Leeds	England	Reading and Leeds Festivals	Various	
28 August 2011	Reading	England	Reading and Leeds Festivals	Various	

== Setlists ==
Throughout the vast majority of the tour, every arena concert would commence with a performance of "Uprising", with the main set ending with either "Unnatural Selection" or "Plug in Baby" and an encore consisting of Exogenesis: Symphony Part 1 (Overture), Stockholm Syndrome and Knights of Cydonia concluding the set. However, towards the end of the tour, Exogenesis Part 1 would sometimes be used as an opener. Also at these shows, Knights of Cydonia would be performed early in the set, signalling the first time this song would not be used as a concert opener or closer since 2006. Uprising would also be played to similar effect at these shows, with that also only being performed as the opening song in concerts prior to the ones opening with Exogenesis Part 1.

Average setlist for tour:

- "We Are The Universe" (intro)
1. Uprising
2. New Born
3. Map of the Problematique
4. Supermassive Black Hole
5. MK Ultra
6. Resistance
7. Guiding Light
8. Interlude/Hysteria
9. Nishe
10. United States of Eurasia
11. Cave
12. Feeling Good (Anthony Newley cover)
13. Butterflies and Hurricanes
14. Sunburn
15. Undisclosed Desires
16. Helsinki Jam
17. Starlight
18. Time Is Running Out
19. Unnatural Selection
20. Plug in Baby

Encore:

1. Exogenesis: Symphony, Part 1 :Overture
2. Stockholm Syndrome
3. Knights of Cydonia

=== Box office score data ===
City	Venue	Tickets Sold / Available	Gross Revenue
Antwerpen	Sportpaleis	18,033 / 18,033 (100%)	$961,067
London	The O2	38,130 / 38,240 (99%)	$2,173,260
Rotterdam	Ahoy	10,940 / 10,940 (100%)	$622,112
Paris	Palais Omnisports Bercy	16,390 / 16,390 (100%)	$1,138,500
Barcelona	Palau Sant Jordi	14,896 / 17,960 (83%)	$769,177
Madrid	Palacio de Los Deportes	15,954 / 15,954 (100%)	$834,134
Duluth	Gwinnett Center	11,267 / 11,267 (100%)	$498,890
Fairfax	Patriot Center	7,500 / 7,500 (100%)	$385,500
Philadelphia	Wachovia Center	15,380 / 16,186 (95%)	$683,712
Baltimore	1st Mariner Arena	8,462 / 8,462 (100%)	$385,887
Boston	TD Banknorth Garden	14,770 / 14,770 (100%)	$737,795
Toronto	Air Canada Centre	15,537 / 15,537 (100%)	$730,279
Montreal	Bell Centre	15,818 / 16,477 (96%)	$821,705
Chicago	United Center	16,284 / 16,284 (100%)	$812,638
Nashville	Bridgestone Arena	7,721 / 7,721 (100%)	$339,687
Fort Worth	Convention Center	9,836 / 11,011 (89%)	$494,607
Edmonton	Rexall Place	8,876 / 11,030 (80%)	$511,917
Calgary	Pengrowth Saddledome	7,648 / 11,256 (69%)	$434,316
Seattle	KeyArena	13,873 / 13,964 (99%)	$573,693
Portland	Rose Garden	9,167 / 10,343 (89%)	$430,274
West Valley City	E Center	10,072 / 10,072 (100%)	$336,852
Phoenix	US Airways Center	9,877 / 9,877 (100%)	$457,765
Paradise	Mandalay Bay Events Center	11,154 / 11,154 (100%)	$519,928
Oakland	Oracle Arena	15,805 / 15,805 (100%)	$678,912
Los Angeles	Staples Center	32,031 / 32,264 (99%)	$1,691,980
Rio Rancho	Santa Ana Star Center	4,915 / 7,500 (65%)	$229,415
Minneapolis	Target Center	7,794 / 8,254 (94%)	$359,642
Milwaukee	Bradley Center	5,838 / 8,000 (73%)	$282,270
Columbus	Schottenstein Center	7,833 / 10,000 (78%)	$354,290
Quebec City	Colisée Pepsi	13,467 / 13,467 (100%)	$709,157
Newark	Prudential Center	12,505 / 13,847 (90%)	$643,970
Brisbane	Brisbane Entertainment Centre	18,810 / 27,370 (69%)	$2,306,030
Sydney	Acer Arena	29,845 / 29,845 (100%)	$3,391,810
TOTAL		456,428 / 485,604 (94%)	$26,301,171

== Cancelled dates ==
Date	City	Country	Venue	R
6 April 2010	Broomfield	United States	1stBank Center	1
21 July 2010	Stockholm	Sweden	Zinkensdamms IP	2
2 November 2010	Kansas City	United States	Sprint Center	3
3 November 2010	St. Louis	United States	Scottrade Center	3
5 November 2010	Columbus	United States	Value City Arena	3
6 November 2010	Cincinnati	United States	U.S. Bank Arena	3

1. Performance in Broomfield cancelled due to heavy snow on the Vail pass blocking the way to the venue. Muse immediately announced a new date for the Denver area to take place at the Pepsi Center on 2 October 2010.
2. Performance in Stockholm, Sweden cancelled due to unforeseen circumstances.
3. Performances in Kansas City and St. Louis were cancelled due to the pending birth of bassist Chris Wolstenholme's fifth child. This also affected the band's performances in Cincinnati and Columbus, which were rescheduled to 11 October 2010 and 12 October 2010, respectively.

== Personnel ==
- Matt Bellamy – lead vocals, guitar, piano, keytar on "Undisclosed Desires"
- Chris Wolstenholme – bass, backing vocals, harmonica
- Dominic Howard – drums
- Morgan Nicholls – keyboards, synthesizers, backing vocals, percussion, brief guitar on "United States of Eurasia".
