= Sylvester J. Ryan =

American judge (1896–1981)

Senior Judge of the United States District Court for the Southern District of New York
- In office January 3, 1973 – April 10, 1981

Chief Judge of the United States District Court for the Southern District of New York
- In office 1959–1966
- Preceded by: John William Clancy
- Succeeded by: Sidney Sugarman

Judge of the United States District Court for the Southern District of New York
- In office November 1, 1947 – January 3, 1973
- Appointed by: Harry S. Truman
- Preceded by: Francis Gordon Caffey
- Succeeded by: Henry Frederick Werker

Personal details
- Born: Sylvester J. Ryan; September 10, 1896 New York City, New York
- Died: April 10, 1981 (aged 84) New York City, New York
- Education: City College of New York; Fordham University School of Law (LL.B.)

Sylvester J. Ryan (September 10, 1896 – April 10, 1981) was a United States district judge of the United States District Court for the Southern District of New York from 1947 to 1981 and its Chief Judge from 1959 to 1966.

== Education and career ==
Born in New York City, New York, Ryan attended the City College of New York and then received a Bachelor of Laws from Fordham University School of Law in 1917. He was in private practice in New York City from 1918 to 1924. He was a chief assistant and acting District Attorney of Bronx County, New York from 1924 to 1947.

== Federal judicial service ==
Ryan received a recess appointment from President Harry S. Truman on November 1, 1947, to a seat on the United States District Court for the Southern District of New York vacated by Judge Francis Gordon Caffey. He was nominated to the same seat by President Truman on November 24, 1947. He was confirmed by the United States Senate on December 18, 1947, and received his commission on December 20, 1947. He served as Chief Judge from 1959 to 1966 and as a member of the Judicial Conference of the United States from 1959 to 1968. He assumed senior status on January 3, 1973. Ryan served in that capacity until his death on April 10, 1981, in New York City.

== Sources ==
Legal offices
Preceded by Francis Gordon Caffey	Judge of the United States District Court for the Southern District of New York; 1947–1973	Succeeded by Henry Frederick Werker
Preceded by John William Clancy	Chief Judge of the United States District Court for the Southern District of New York; 1959–1966	Succeeded by Sidney Sugarman
