= John C. Knox (New York judge) =

American judge (1881–1966)

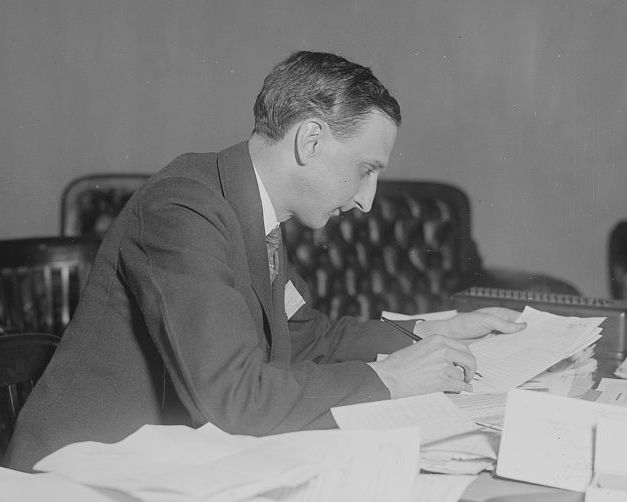

Senior Judge of the United States District Court for the Southern District of New York
- In office April 30, 1955 – August 23, 1966

Chief Judge of the United States District Court for the Southern District of New York
- In office 1948–1955
- Preceded by: Office established
- Succeeded by: William Bondy

Judge of the United States District Court for the Southern District of New York
- In office April 12, 1918 – April 30, 1955
- Appointed by: Woodrow Wilson
- Preceded by: Martin Thomas Manton
- Succeeded by: Richard Harrington Levet

Personal details
- Born: John Clark Knox; October 13, 1881 Waynesburg, Pennsylvania
- Died: August 23, 1966 (aged 84)
- Education: Waynesburg College (AB); University of Pennsylvania Law School read law

John Clark Knox (October 13, 1881 – August 23, 1966) was a United States district judge of the United States District Court for the Southern District of New York from 1918 to 1966 and its first chief judge from 1948 to 1955.

== Education and career ==
Born on October 13, 1881, in Waynesburg, Pennsylvania, Knox received an Artium Baccalaureus degree in 1902 from Waynesburg College and after attending the University of Pennsylvania Law School, read law in 1904. He was an attorney with the Law Department of the Title Guarantee and Trust Company in New York City, New York from 1905 to 1913. He was an Assistant United States Attorney for the Southern District of New York from 1913 to 1918.

=== Federal judicial service ===
Knox was nominated by President Woodrow Wilson on March 29, 1918, to a seat on the United States District Court for the Southern District of New York vacated by Judge Martin Thomas Manton. He was confirmed by the United States Senate on April 12, 1918, and received his commission the same day. He served as chief judge from 1948 to 1955. Judge Knox assumed senior status on April 30, 1955, when he remained the last federal judge in active service appointed to his position by President Wilson. (Note: When Judge Knox took senior status, two judges appointed by Wilson to district courts – Joseph William Woodrough and Joseph Chappell Hutcheson Jr. – remained in active service as appellate judges by appointment of later presidents. Judge Woodrough remained in active service until 1961 and Judge Hutcheson until 1964.) His service terminated on August 23, 1966, due to his death.

Judge Knox handled a number of notable cases, for instance ruling that James Joyce's Ulysses was not obscene.

== Legacy ==
Knox wrote two books on his judicial service, A Judge Comes of Age (1940) and Order in the Court (1943).

A year before taking senior status, Knox said that the inflation of the US dollar had reduced his savings from his career on the bench to $6,200. (Note: Equal to about $74,000 in 2025 dollars.)

== See also ==
- List of United States federal judges by longevity of service

== Notes ==
Legal offices
Preceded by Martin Thomas Manton	Judge of the United States District Court for the Southern District of New York; 1918–1955	Succeeded by Richard Harrington Levet
Preceded by Office established	Chief Judge of the United States District Court for the Southern District of New York; 1948–1955	Succeeded by William Bondy
