= Susan M. Wolf =

American lawyer

- Born: Washington, DC
- Occupations: Regents Professor and McKnight Presidential Professor of Law, Medicine & Public Policy

Academic background
- Education: Princeton University (BA); Yale University (JD)

Academic work
- Institutions: University of Minnesota

Susan M. Wolf is an American lawyer and bioethicist. She is a Regents Professor; McKnight Presidential Professor of Law, Medicine & Public Policy; Faegre Baker Daniels Professor of Law; and Professor of Medicine at the University of Minnesota. She is also founding chair of the university's Consortium on Law and Values in Health, Environment & the Life Sciences.

== Early life and education ==
Wolf received an A.B. degree with highest honors from Princeton University in 1975 and a J.D. degree from Yale Law School in 1980. Following this, Wolf clerked for Judge Leonard B. Sand of the United States District Court for the Southern District of New York. In 1981-84 she practiced law as an associate in the firm of Paul, Weiss, Rifkind, Wharton & Garrison before joining The Hastings Center (then in Hastings-on-Hudson, NY) as a National Endowment for the Humanities Fellow.

== Career ==
Wolf served as associate for law at The Hastings Center 1985-92, where she led and participated in projects on end-of-life care, health care reform, and other issues in bioethics. Wolf directed the project that produced Guidelines on the Termination of Life-Sustaining Treatment and the Care of the Dying (1987); in 2013 Oxford University Press published the second edition, co-authored by Nancy Berlinger, Bruce Jennings, and Wolf. While at The Hastings Center, Wolf also taught law and medicine at New York University School of Law as an adjunct associate professor from 1987 to 1992. In 1992-93, she was a Fellow at Harvard University in the Program in Ethics and the Professions. Wolf joined the faculty at the University of Minnesota as associate professor of law and medicine in 1993, where she was awarded tenure in 1996 and promoted to full professor in 1999. In 2000 she was named the Faegre Baker Daniels Professor of Law and in 2006 became the McKnight Presidential Professor of Law, Medicine & Public Policy. Wolf was named a Regents Professor in 2021. Wolf has been elected a fellow of the American Association for the Advancement of Science, a member of the National Academy of Medicine, a member of the American Law Institute, and a fellow of The Hastings Center.

Wolf has received numerous grants to support her research, including from the National Institutes of Health (NIH), National Science Foundation (NSF), Robert Wood Johnson Foundation, and The Greewall Foundation. Much of her research has focused on the ethical, legal, and societal implications of emerging biomedical technologies including genomics, neuroimaging, nanomedicine, and biomedical engineering. Beginning in 2005, she served as principal investigator on a series of NIH-funded projects on return of research results and incidental findings to research participants and their relatives. Starting in 2016, Wolf served as principal investigator with Profs. Ellen Wright Clayton and Frances Lawrenz on a collaborative NIH-funded project on "LawSeqSM: Building a Sound Legal Foundation for Translating Genomics into Clinical Application." This was "a project convening legal, ethics, and scientific experts from across the country to analyze the current state of genomic law and create much-needed guidance on what it should be."

Wolf has served on committees at the National Academies of Science, Engineering, and Medicine including the Committee on Science, Engineering, Medicine and Public Policy (COSEMPUP). In 2021, she was selected to join the Strategic Council for Research Excellence, Integrity, and Trust of the National Academy of Sciences. The aim of the council is to develop ways to "promote high-quality research practices and to anticipate and address challenges to research ethics and integrity." She has also served on committees for NIH, such as the External Advisory Panel for the Trans-Omics in Precision Medicine Program at the National Heart, Lung, and Blood Institute (NHLBI). Beginning in March 2020, Wolf and Prof. Debra DeBruin have co-led a statewide Minnesota COVID Ethics Collaborative (MCEC), a joint venture between the Minnesota Department of Health, the State Health Care Coordination Center, Minnesota Hospital Association, and the University of Minnesota. The aim of MCEC is to rapidly share ethics expertise and policy to cope with moral challenges posed by the COVID-19 crisis. In 2020, Wolf was appointed as the Ethics and Public Policy Director of NSF funded Engineering Research Center ATP-Bio (Advanced Technologies for Preservation of Biological Systems). Most recently, in 2022 Wolf was awarded NSF NetEthics grant to investigate on the ethics of large, multidisciplinary engineering research networks.
