= The Quails =

English indie rock band

- Origin: Teignmouth, Devon, England
- Genres: Indie rock, pop rock
- Years active: 2006–2011
- Label: Like The Sound Records
- Members: Dan Steer; Max Armstrong; Sam Banks; Chris Prentice
- Website: www.thequails.info

The Quails were an English indie rock band that formed in Teignmouth, Devon in 2006. Comprising vocalist and guitarist Dan Steer, guitarist Max Armstrong, bassist Sam Banks and drummer Chris Prentice, the band released one studio album – I've Heard It's All Rumours in 2008. The Quails split in 2011 after a 5 years of being together, lead singer Dan Steer has formed a new band - These Reigning Days.

The members of The Quails all hail from the same school in Teignmouth. Their most notable appearance was supporting Muse's homecoming gig in 2009. They have toured in England and supported The Kooks, and played in Turkey at an EU-funded festival headlined by Motörhead. A TV crew from Exeter followed the band to Turkey and is to air a documentary. The band supported alternative rock band Muse, also from Teignmouth, at the first show of A Seaside Rendezvous, the band's 2009 homecoming gigs.

Their first album, I've Heard It's All Rumours, was released independently in 2008. Their second album, Master of Imperfection, is due out in May 2010.

== Music videos ==
The band released three music videos; the last of which is the video for Fever (from the Master of Imperfection album) which features the band being chased by domo-kun esque cardboard box monsters after they inadvertently anger a cardboard box.

== Band members ==
- Dan Steer – vocals, guitar, keyboards
- Max Armstrong – lead guitar
- Sam Banks – bass
- Chris Prentice – drums
- John Foulkes - Rhythm Guitar

== Discography ==
- I've Heard It's All Rumours (2008)
- Master of Imperfection (2010)
