= William Bondy =

American judge (1870–1964)

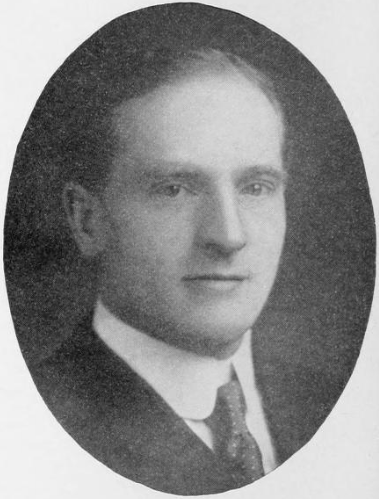

Senior Judge of the United States District Court for the Southern District of New York
- In office May 1, 1956 – March 30, 1964

Chief Judge of the United States District Court for the Southern District of New York
- In office 1955–1956
- Preceded by: John C. Knox
- Succeeded by: John William Clancy

Judge of the United States District Court for the Southern District of New York
- In office March 2, 1923 – May 1, 1956
- Appointed by: Warren G. Harding
- Preceded by: Julius Marshuetz Mayer
- Succeeded by: Frederick van Pelt Bryan

Personal details
- Born: April 9, 1870 New York City, New York, US
- Died: March 30, 1964 (aged 93) New York City, New York, US
- Education: Columbia University (B.A., M.A., Ph.D.); Columbia Law School (LL.B.)

William Bondy (April 9, 1870 – March 30, 1964) was a United States district judge of the United States District Court for the Southern District of New York from 1923 to 1964, and its Chief Judge from 1955 to 1956.

== Education and career ==
Born on April 9, 1870, in New York City, New York, Bondy received a Bachelor of Arts degree in 1890, a Master of Arts degree in 1891, and a Doctor of Philosophy in 1892, all from Columbia University. He received a Bachelor of Laws in 1893 from Columbia Law School. He was in private practice in New York City from 1893 to 1923.

== Federal judicial service ==
Bondy was nominated by President Warren G. Harding on February 28, 1923, to a seat on the United States District Court for the Southern District of New York vacated by Judge Julius Marshuetz Mayer. He was confirmed by the United States Senate on March 2, 1923, and received his commission the same day. He served as Chief Judge from 1955 to 1956. He assumed senior status on May 1, 1956. His service terminated on March 30, 1964, due to his death in New York City.

== See also ==
- List of United States federal judges by longevity of service

== Sources ==
Legal offices
Preceded by Julius Marshuetz Mayer	Judge of the United States District Court for the Southern District of New York; 1923–1956	Succeeded by Frederick van Pelt Bryan
Preceded by John C. Knox	Chief Judge of the United States District Court for the Southern District of New York; 1955–1956	Succeeded by John William Clancy
