= Richard Harrington Levet =

American judge (1894–1980)

Senior Judge of the United States District Court for the Southern District of New York
- In office July 1, 1966 – May 3, 1976

Judge of the United States District Court for the Southern District of New York
- In office March 8, 1956 – July 1, 1966
- Appointed by: Dwight D. Eisenhower
- Preceded by: John C. Knox
- Succeeded by: Morris E. Lasker

Personal details
- Born: Richard Harrington Levet; January 24, 1894 Geneva, New York
- Died: February 11, 1980 (aged 86) White Plains, New York
- Education: Colgate University (A.B., A.M.); New York University School of Law (J.D.)

Richard Harrington Levet (January 24, 1894 – February 11, 1980) was a United States district judge of the United States District Court for the Southern District of New York.

== Education and career ==
Born in Geneva, New York, Levet received an Artium Baccalaureus degree from Colgate University in 1916, an Artium Magister degree from the same institution in 1917, and a Juris Doctor from New York University School of Law in 1925. He was in the United States Army as a private from 1918 to 1919. He was a teacher in New York, Pennsylvania and Connecticut from 1922 to 1926. He was in private practice in White Plains, New York from 1926 to 1956. He was a member of the Westchester County Board of Supervisors in New York from 1938 to 1956, serving as chairman from 1945 to 1946.

== Federal judicial service ==
Levet was nominated by President Dwight D. Eisenhower on January 26, 1956, to a seat on the United States District Court for the Southern District of New York vacated by Judge John C. Knox. He was confirmed by the United States Senate on March 6, 1956, and received his commission on March 8, 1956. He assumed senior status on July 1, 1966. Levet retired on May 3, 1976. He died on February 11, 1980, in White Plains.

== Sources ==
Legal offices
Preceded by John C. Knox	Judge of the United States District Court for the Southern District of New York; 1956–1966	Succeeded by Morris E. Lasker
