= John William Clancy =

American judge

Senior Judge of the United States District Court for the Southern District of New York
- In office April 3, 1959 – March 2, 1969

Chief Judge of the United States District Court for the Southern District of New York
- In office 1956–1959
- Preceded by: William Bondy
- Succeeded by: Sylvester J. Ryan

Judge of the United States District Court for the Southern District of New York
- In office June 22, 1936 – April 3, 1959
- Appointed by: Franklin D. Roosevelt
- Preceded by: Seat established by 49 Stat. 1491
- Succeeded by: Charles Miller Metzner

Personal details
- Born: John William Clancy; February 24, 1888 New York City, New York
- Died: March 2, 1969 (aged 81) New York City, New York
- Education: Fordham University (B.A.); Fordham University School of Law (LL.B.)

John William Clancy (February 24, 1888 – March 2, 1969) was a United States district judge of the United States District Court for the Southern District of New York from 1936 to 1969 an its Chief Judge from 1956 to 1959.

== Education and career ==
Born in New York City, New York, Clancy received a Bachelor of Arts degree from Fordham University in 1909 and a Bachelor of Laws from Fordham University School of Law in 1912. He was in private practice in New York City from 1912 to 1936.

== Federal judicial service ==
On June 15, 1936, Clancy was nominated by President Franklin D. Roosevelt to a new seat on the United States District Court for the Southern District of New York created by 49 Stat. 1491. He was confirmed by the United States Senate on June 20, 1936, and received his commission two days later. He served as Chief Judge from 1956 to 1959, assuming senior status on April 3, 1959. Clancy served in that capacity until his death in New York City on March 2, 1969.

== Sources ==
Legal offices
| Preceded by Seat established by 49 Stat. 1491 | Judge of the United States District Court for the Southern District of New York; 1936–1959 | Succeeded by Charles Miller Metzner |
| Preceded by William Bondy | Chief Judge of the United States District Court for the Southern District of New York; 1956–1959 | Succeeded by Sylvester J. Ryan |
