= Frederick van Pelt Bryan =

American judge

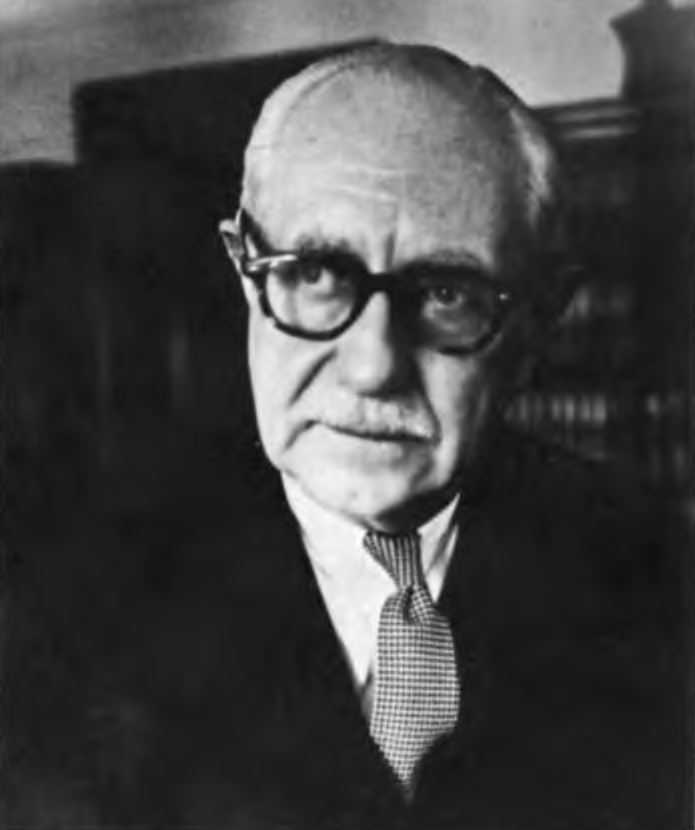

Senior Judge of the United States District Court for the Southern District of New York
- In office April 1, 1972 – April 17, 1978

Judge of the United States District Court for the Southern District of New York
- In office June 19, 1956 – April 1, 1972
- Appointed by: Dwight D. Eisenhower
- Preceded by: William Bondy
- Succeeded by: Robert Joseph Ward

Personal details
- Born: Frederick van Pelt Bryan; April 27, 1904 Brooklyn, New York, U.S.
- Died: April 17, 1978 (aged 73) New York City, New York, U.S.
- Education: Columbia College (A.B.); Columbia Law School (LL.B.)

Frederick van Pelt Bryan (April 27, 1904 – April 17, 1978) was a United States district judge of the United States District Court for the Southern District of New York.

== Education and career ==
Born in Brooklyn, New York, Bryan received an Artium Baccalaureus degree from Columbia College in 1925 and a Bachelor of Laws from Columbia Law School in 1928. He was in private practice in New York City from 1928 to 1933. He was an assistant corporation counsel in New York City from 1933 to 1937, and a first assistant corporation counsel from 1938 to 1942.

He served in the United States Army Air Forces during World War II, from 1942 to 1946. He was initially commissioned as a first lieutenant and rose to the rank of colonel by the end of his service. He served in Europe and the Mediterranean, and received the Legion of Merit, the Croix de Guerre and the Order of the British Empire.

After the war, he returned to private practice in New York City from 1946 to 1956. He was a member of the Temporary State Commission to Study the Organizational Structure of the Government of the City of New York from 1953 to 1954, and was counsel to the Temporary Commission on the Courts of the State of New York from 1954 to 1956.

== Federal judicial service ==
On May 18, 1956, Bryan was nominated by President Dwight D. Eisenhower to a seat on the United States District Court for the Southern District of New York vacated by Judge William Bondy. Bryan was confirmed by the United States Senate on June 13, 1956, and received his commission on June 19, 1956. He assumed senior status on April 1, 1972, serving in that capacity until his death on April 17, 1978, in New York City.

=== Notable case ===
Bryan authored the opinion holding that D. H. Lawrence's novel Lady Chatterley's Lover was not obscene, based on its "redeeming social or literary value", introducing a standard henceforth upheld by the Supreme Court.

== Sources ==
Legal offices
Preceded by William Bondy	Judge of the United States District Court for the Southern District of New York; 1956–1972	Succeeded by Robert Joseph Ward
