= Morris E. Lasker =

American judge

Morris Edward Lasker

Senior Judge of the United States District Court for the Southern District of New York
- In office October 3, 1983 – December 25, 2009

Judge of the United States District Court for the Southern District of New York
- In office June 24, 1968 – October 3, 1983
- Appointed by: Lyndon B. Johnson
- Preceded by: Richard Harrington Levet
- Succeeded by: John M. Walker Jr.

Personal details
- Born: Morris Edward Lasker; July 17, 1917 Hartsdale, New York, U.S.
- Died: December 25, 2009 (aged 92) Cambridge, Massachusetts, U.S.
- Education: Harvard University (BA); Yale University (LLB)

Morris Edward Lasker (July 17, 1917 – December 25, 2009) was a United States district judge of the United States District Court for the Southern District of New York.

== Early life and career ==
Lasker was born in Hartsdale, New York and attended the Horace Mann School. He received a Bachelor of Arts degree from Harvard College in 1938 and a Bachelor of Laws from Yale Law School in 1941. He was a staff attorney of United States Senate Committee Investigating National Defense Programs from 1941 to 1942. He was in the United States Army Air Forces during World War II from 1942 to 1946 and became a major. He served in France. He was in private practice in New York City from 1946 to 1968, also serving as a town attorney of New Castle from 1955 to 1957, and as a justice of the peace for New Castle from 1957 to 1958.

== Federal judicial service ==
On November 28, 1967, President Lyndon B. Johnson nominated Lasker to a seat on the United States District Court for the Southern District of New York vacated by Judge Richard Harrington Levet. Lasker was recommended by Senator Robert F. Kennedy and temporarily held up by Senator Jacob K. Javits, but he was confirmed by the United States Senate on June 24, 1968, and received his commission the same day. After Senator Kennedy's assassination Senator Javits personally escorted Lasker to the Senate Judiciary Committee hearing and apologized for holding up Lasker's confirmation. He assumed senior status on October 3, 1983. In 1994 he and his wife moved to the Boston, Massachusetts area so that they could be closer to their children. From then until his death he served as a judge of the United States District Court for the District of Massachusetts by special designation. He died of cancer at Mount Auburn Hospital in Cambridge, Massachusetts on December 25, 2009.

=== Notable case ===
In 1975, Lasker denied a preliminary injunction to restrain the American Broadcasting Company (ABC) from broadcasting edited versions of three separate programs originally written and performed by Monty Python for broadcast by the BBC, brought to court by Terry Gilliam and Michael Palin.[4]

== See also ==
- List of Jewish American jurists

== Sources ==
Legal offices
Preceded by Richard Harrington Levet	Judge of the United States District Court for the Southern District of New York; 1968–1983	Succeeded by John M. Walker Jr.
