= Resistance (Muse song) =

2010 single by Muse

- Standard artwork

Single by Muse

from the album The Resistance
- B-side: "Popcorn"; "Prague"
- Released: 22 February 2010
- Recorded: 2008–2009
- Studio: Bellini, Lake Como, Italy
- Genre: Alternative rock; progressive rock
- Length: 5:46 (album version); 3:55 (radio edit)
- Label: Warner Bros.; Helium-3
- Songwriter: Matt Bellamy
- Producer: Muse

Muse singles chronology
"Undisclosed Desires" (2009)	"Resistance" (2010)	"Exogenesis: Symphony" (2010)

Music video
- "Resistance" by Muse on YouTube

"Resistance" is a song by English rock band Muse, featured as the title track on their fifth studio album The Resistance (2009). Written by vocalist, guitarist and pianist Matt Bellamy and produced by the band, it was released as the third single from the album, following "Uprising" and "Undisclosed Desires", on 22 February 2010. The song makes several references to the novel Nineteen Eighty-Four, by George Orwell. The intro of the song is used in the trailer of the last episode of BBC show Silent Witness. In February 2010, Muse had uploaded a picture puzzle of "Resistance" artwork on their official Facebook page. The puzzle itself has a making of the "Resistance" track (which will be able to see it after solving the puzzle). The song was featured in a promo for an episode of Human Target. The song was also released as downloadable content for the music video game Guitar Hero: Warriors of Rock.

== Music video ==
The music video for "Resistance" was directed by Wayne Isham and debuted on 14 January 2010. It features footage of the band's live performance of the song at the Palacio de los Deportes in Madrid, Spain on 28 November 2009 during their The Resistance Tour.

== Reception ==
"Resistance" reached number 35 in the Triple J Hottest 100, 2009. On 22 February 2010, "Resistance" debuted at number 17 on the Hot30 Countdown. On 26 March 2010, "Resistance" debuted at number 20 on the VH1 Top 20 Video Countdown, peaking at number 9.

The song was nominated at the 53rd Grammy Awards in two categories: Best Rock Performance by a Duo or Group with Vocal and Best Rock Song. It lost in both categories to Neil Young's "Angry World", and The Black Keys' "Tighten Up", respectively. In 2011, Croatian group 2Cellos covered this song as a cello duet.

"Resistance" was played frequently in concert by Muse. The song was played at most shows during The Resistance Tour, was played frequently during The 2nd Law Tour, and on rarer occasions during the Drones World Tour. A live version of "Resistance" was included on Live at Rome Olympic Stadium.

== Track listing ==
CD single
No.	Title	Writer(s)	Length
1.	"Resistance"	Matt Bellamy	5:46
2.	"Prague" (Mega City Four cover)	Darren Brown	3:36
Total length:			9:22

7-inch vinyl
No.	Title	Writer(s)	Length
1.	"Resistance"	Bellamy	5:46
2.	"Popcorn" (Gershon Kingsley cover)	Gershon Kingsley	2:25
Total length:			8:11

Digital download
No.	Title	Writer(s)	Length
1.	"Resistance"	Bellamy	5:46
2.	"Resistance" (radio edit)	Bellamy	3:55
3.	"Resistance" (Tiësto remix)	Bellamy	8:10
Total length:			17:51

Muse.mu "B-side bundle" download
No.	Title	Writer(s)	Length
1.	"Resistance" (Tiësto remix)	Bellamy	8:10
2.	"Popcorn" (Gershon Kingsley cover)	Kingsley	2:25
3.	"Prague" (Mega City Four cover)	Brown	3:36
Total length:			14:51

== Charts ==
=== Commercial performance ===
On 21 February 2010, "Resistance" entered the UK Rock Chart at number two. Following from its success on the Rock Chart, on 28 February 2010, the single entered the UK Singles Chart as a new entry at number 38, beating previous single: "Undisclosed Desires", which only peaked at number 49. "Resistance" is now the second Top 40 hit from The Resistance. The same week resulted in "Resistance" climbing to the number one spot on the UK Rock Chart, as well. On the week of 20 March, it jumped from number six to number one on the Billboard Alternative Rock Chart and it became their second number one single on the chart along with their previous single "Uprising".

=== Weekly charts ===
Chart (2010)	Peak position
Australia (ARIA)	72
Belgium (Ultratip Bubbling Under Flanders)	10
Belgium (Ultratip Bubbling Under Wallonia)	5
Canada (Canadian Hot 100)	91
Dutch Tipparade	51
Polish Singles Chart	1
Scottish Singles Sales (Official Charts)	33
UK Singles Chart	38
UK Rock Chart	1
US Billboard Bubbling Under Hot 100 Singles	14
US Billboard Rock Songs	7
US Billboard Alternative Songs	1

== Certifications ==
Region	Certification	Certified units/sales
United Kingdom (BPI)	Silver	200,000^{‡}
^{‡} Sales+streaming figures based on certification alone.

== See also ==
- List of number-one alternative rock singles of 2010 (U.S.)
- List of number-one rock hits of 2010 (UK)
