= The Resistance (album) =

Studio album by Muse
- Released: 14 September 2009
- Recorded: September 2008 – May 2009
- Studio: Studio Bellini (Lake Como)
- Genres: Alternative rock; art rock; progressive rock; space rock; arena rock
- Length: 54:19
- Labels: Warner Bros.; Helium-3
- Producer: Muse

Muse chronology
HAARP (2008)	The Resistance (2009)	The 2nd Law (2012)

Singles from The Resistance
- 1. "Uprising" Released: 4 August 2009; 2. "Undisclosed Desires" Released: 16 November 2009; 3. "Resistance" Released: 22 February 2010; 4. "Exogenesis: Symphony" Released: 17 April 2010

The Resistance is the fifth studio album by the English rock band Muse, released on 14 September 2009 through Warner Bros. Records and Muse's Helium-3 imprint. It was produced by the band, recording from September 2008 to May 2009 at their studio in Como, Italy. The Resistance mixes rock with orchestral and electronic music, with lyrics influenced by politics and more oppressive subjects. It includes a three-part 13-minute symphony, "Exogenesis".

The album was promoted with the singles "Uprising", "Undisclosed Desires", and "Resistance". "Exogenesis: Symphony" was released on vinyl for Record Store Day. The Resistance Tour comprised 30 shows.

The Resistance received generally positive reviews, with critics praising its concept, instrumentation, influences and vocals, although some found it overblown and clichéd. At the 53rd Annual Grammy Awards, it won the award for Best Rock Album. It is Muse's most successful album, with more than five million copies sold worldwide. It reached number one in 19 countries and the top five in the United States and several others. It was certified platinum in countries including the UK and US.

== Recording ==
On 22 May 2008, NME reported that Muse had begun writing songs for their new album. The band released three videos of recording footage, including a session in a lavatory. In a Twitter update on 23 June, Muse said the album was complete, with only mastering left to complete in New York. The album was mixed by Mark Stent at Muse's studio in Como, Italy.

At the 2010 Music Producers Guild, Bellamy thanked the producer Rick Rubin "for teaching us how not to produce", which some sources took to mean Muse had fired Rubin from the Resistance sessions. Bellamy said his comment had been misconstrued and that Muse had never worked with Rubin; instead, he said Muse had been inspired by stories of his "hands-off" production style.

== Composition ==
The Resistance has been described as featuring art rock, progressive rock, space rock, alternative rock, and arena rock. Bellamy cited the 1949 dystopian novel Nineteen Eighty-Four by George Orwell as an influence on the lyrics and themes.

"Uprising" was inspired by the electronica band Goldfrapp and 1970s and 1980s glam rock. For "I Belong to You", Chris Wolstenholme, played an acoustic bass guitar processed with an Akai Deep Impact bass synthesiser pedal. "Undisclosed Desires" was influenced by contemporary R&B and the 1980 David Bowie song "Ashes to Ashes", and features slap bass. Bellamy noted that it was the first Muse song with no guitar or piano.

The Resistance includes a three-song suite, "Exogenesis", described by Bellamy as "a story of humanity coming to an end and everyone pinning their hopes on a group of astronauts who go out to explore space and spread humanity to another planet". Eventually the astronauts "realise that it is just one big cycle, and recognise that unless humanity can change it will happen all over again". The suite features an orchestra of more than 40 musicians.

== Promotion and release ==
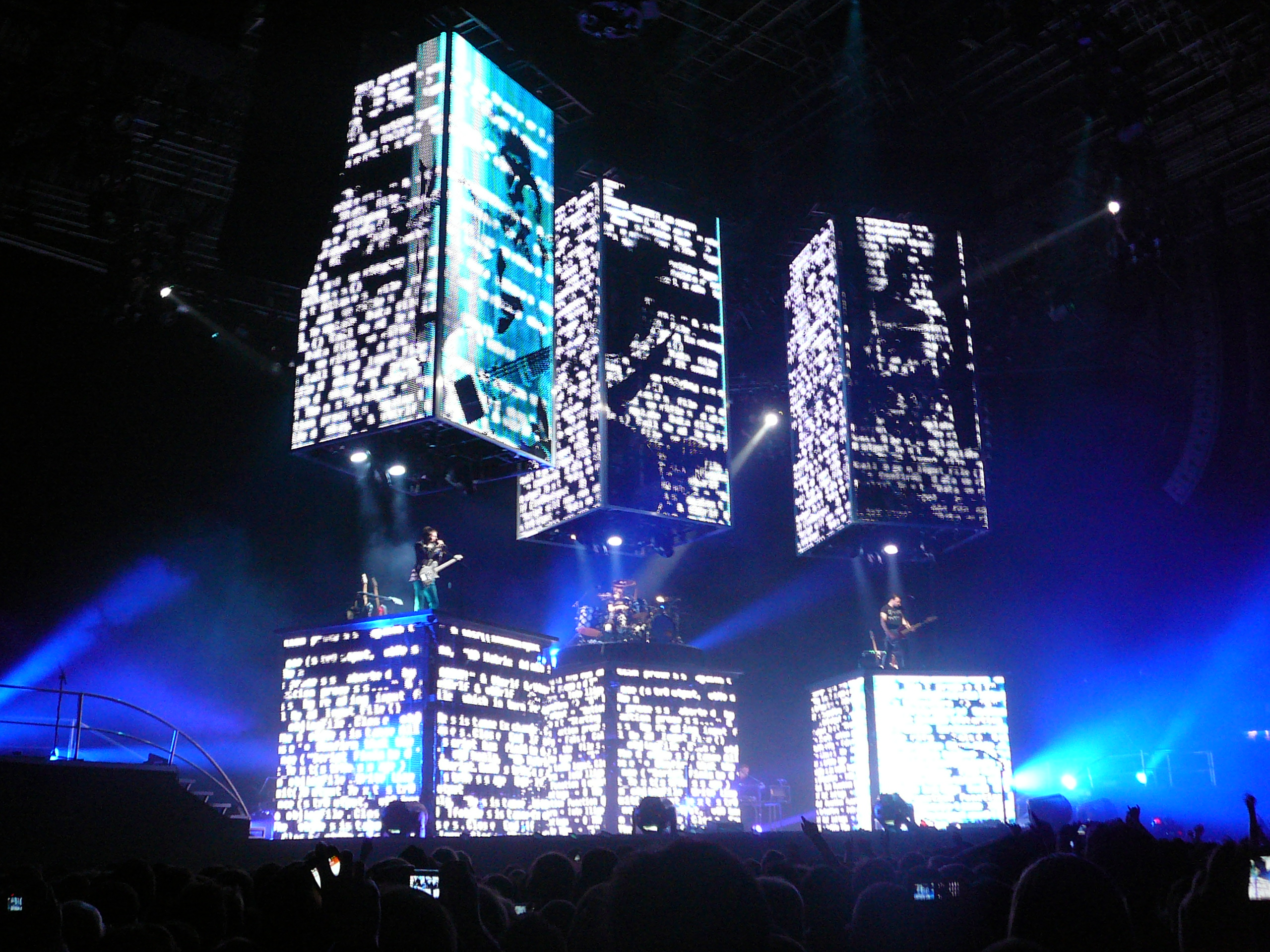
Muse performing at the Birmingham NIA

Muse announced the title The Resistance on their Twitter page on 22 May. The first song was announced as "United States of Eurasia" on the Muse website, deciphered by fans from a picture of a piece of sheet music held by Bellamy in a photo uploaded on the Twitter page.

On 16 June 2009, Muse announced that the album would be released on 14 September 2009. "Uprising" was released as the first single. "Undisclosed Desires" was uploaded to Muse's official website for streaming by website members on 9 September. From 10 September, the album was made available to stream free through the Guardian website.

The Resistance was released on iTunes as one of the first iTunes LPs. It contains the album as well as added extras such as animated artwork and behind the scenes videos. A remix of "I Belong to You" was included on the soundtrack to New Moon, the second film in the Twilight film series.

As well as the CD, CD+DVD, LP, and download versions, Muse released a box set containing the CD+DVD, LPs, a USB stick containing the album with a bespoke media player, and an art print. A special version of the box set, limited to 5,000 copies, was also produced, containing a DVD with a 5.1 surround sound mix of The Resistance; this mix also includes a longer version of "Unnatural Selection".

== Tour ==
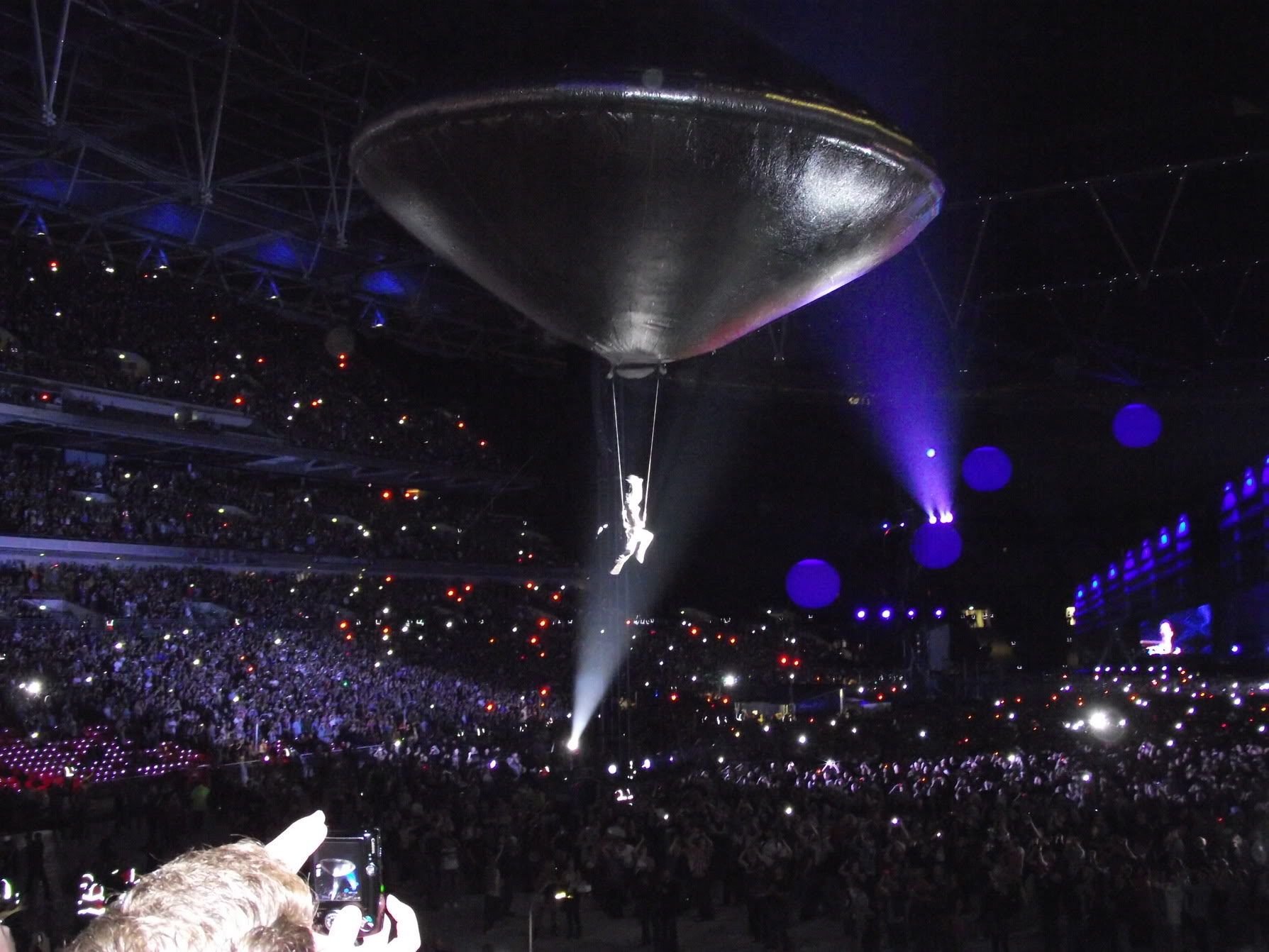
Muse performing in Wembley Stadium, London, in 2010

On 4 and 5 September 2009, Muse performed a pair of homecoming concerts, "A Seaside Rendezvous", in their hometown of Teignmouth, Devon. They supported U2 on the North American leg of their 360° Tour in late 2009. In June 2009, Muse confirmed the dates for a European leg of the Resistance Tour, which would comprise 30 shows. Tickets for the UK arena dates, both pre-sale and general sale, sold out within minutes.

The opening European leg began on 22 October 2009 and ended on 4 December 2009, comprising 30 shows. The second leg, which began on 7 January 2010, included thirteen shows, seven of which were part of the Australasian Big Day Out shows. A North American leg of 26 shows took place in early 2010. Nine stadium shows took place in Europe in 2010, with three of those dates taking place at Wembley Stadium and Old Trafford Cricket Ground. A second round of North American concerts took place throughout September and October 2010. At the conclusion of 2010, the tour was placed on Pollstar's annual "Year End Top 50 Worldwide Concert Tours", and appeared 13th worldwide, earning over $76 million with 64 shows in 2010.

== Reception ==
Professional ratings
Aggregate scores
Source	Rating
AnyDecentMusic?	6.4/10
Metacritic	72/100
Review scores
Source	Rating
AllMusic	4.5/5 stars
The A.V. Club	B
Entertainment Weekly	B
The Guardian	4/5 stars
Los Angeles Times	2.5/4 stars
NME	6/10
Pitchfork	5.9/10
Q	4/5 stars
Rolling Stone	3/5 stars
Spin	7/10

The Resistance received generally positive reviews. At Metacritic, which assigns a normalised rating out of 100 to reviews from mainstream critics, the album has an average score of 72 based on 23 reviews, indicating "generally favourable reviews".

Andrew Leahey of AllMusic called The Resistance "by and large a fantastic record", highlighting "Guiding Light", "United States of Eurasia", and "Exogenesis". In an interview with The Sunday Times, Dan Cairns wrote that "Muse have made an album of genius, brilliance and beauty". NME identified "Exogenesis: Symphony" as a highlight, describing it as Muse's "most bombastic work yet".

Multiple reviews criticised the album as unoriginal, in some instances calling it a caricature of progressive rock. Ben Patashnik from NME felt that it was "genius" in parts, but criticised it for producing something "conceptually impressive but musically all too familiar". Pitchfork wrote that the songs were "an outgrowth of wanting to make the music as big, inclusive and as singalong as possible, rather than any inchoate political impulses" and criticising its "mass-shout-along-ready lyrics". The review concluded: "Judged on its own terms – out of control scale, genre-smashing ambition, musical and vocal virtuosity — The Resistance is a success."

Rolling Stone said "Uprising" proved that Muse could still "whip up an almighty roar", but dismissed the album as clichéd and derivative of Queen. The Queen guitarist, Brian May, praised the Queen influence, saying: "I love it, I think it's great stuff. I think they're very good boys and extremely talented, and like us they have their tongue in cheek a lot of the time." He described "United States of Eurasia" as "brilliantly done". The Resistance won the Grammy Award for Best Rock Album at the 53rd Annual Grammy Awards in 2011.

The Resistance was praised by the rightwing Fox News anchor Glenn Beck, and "Uprising" was used in YouTube videos advocating for conspiracy theories. Bellamy expressed discomfort, describing himself as "a left-leaning libertarian – more in the realm of Noam Chomsky". Muse refused requests from American politicians to use "Uprising" in their rallies. Beck responded in an open letter to Bellamy: "As uncomfortable as it might be for you, I will still play your songs loudly. To me your songs are anthems that beg for choruses of unity and pose the fundamental question facing the world today – can man rule himself?"

In September 2012, the American songwriter Charles Bollfrass sued Muse for $3.5m (£2.2m), claiming that they had plagiarised The Resistance from a science-fiction rock opera concept he sent them in 2005. Muse said they had never heard of Bolffrass or seen his work. The lawsuit was dismissed by a New York judge in 2013, who said the album's narrative was too abstract to constitute any infringement.

== Track listing ==
All tracks are written by Matt Bellamy, except where noted.

The Resistance – Standard edition
No.	Title	Writer(s)	Length
1.	"Uprising"		5:03
2.	"Resistance"		5:46
3.	"Undisclosed Desires"		3:56
4.	"United States of Eurasia (+ Collateral Damage)"	Bellamy; Frédéric Chopin	5:47
5.	"Guiding Light"		4:13
6.	"Unnatural Selection"		6:54
7.	"MK Ultra"		4:06
8.	"I Belong to You (+ Mon Cœur S'ouvre a ta Voix)"	Bellamy; Camille Saint-Saëns	5:38
9.	"Exogenesis: Symphony Part 1 (Overture)"		4:18
10.	"Exogenesis: Symphony Part 2 (Cross-Pollination)"		3:56
11.	"Exogenesis: Symphony Part 3 (Redemption)"		4:37
Total length:			54:18

Notes

- "Collateral Damage" contains elements of Nocturne in E flat major, Op. 9, No. 2, composed by Frédéric Chopin.
- "Mon cœur s'ouvre a ta voix" written by Camille Saint-Saëns.

== Personnel ==
Personnel adapted from The Resistance liner notes

Muse

- Matt Bellamy – vocals, guitars, keyboards, piano, synthesisers, programming, orchestral arrangements, production
- Chris Wolstenholme – bass guitar, backing vocals, production
- Dominic Howard – drums, percussion, synthesisers, programming, production

Session musicians

- Edodea Ensemble; orchestra, conducted by Audrey Riley and led by concertmaster Edoardo de Angelis
- Enrico Gabrielli – bass clarinet on "I Belong to You"
- Tom Kirk – handclaps and football hooligan noises on "Uprising"

Main production personnel

- Adrian Bushby – engineering, handclaps and football hooligan noises on "Uprising"
- Ted Jensen – mastering
- Mark "Spike" Stent – mixing

Additional personnel

- La Boca – artwork
- Des Broadbery – additional technical and logistical support
- Danny Clinch – photography
- Tommaso Colliva – additional engineering, technical setup
- Matthew Green – mixing assistance
- Paul Reeve – additional vocal production, handclaps and football hooligan noises on "Uprising"

== Release history ==
Region	Date	Label	Format	Catalog	Ref.
Australia; Benelux; Germany; Italy; Switzerland; Ireland	11 September 2009	Warner	CD	2564687434	
Australia; Benelux; Germany; Italy; Switzerland; Ireland	11 September 2009	Warner	CD+DVD	2564686625	
Australia; Benelux; Germany; Italy; Switzerland; Ireland	11 September 2009	Warner	CD+DVD+2 LP+USB	Unknown	
Europe; New Zealand	14 September 2009	Helium 3	CD	825646874347	
Europe; New Zealand	14 September 2009	Helium 3	CD+DVD	825646866250	
Europe; New Zealand	14 September 2009	Helium 3	CD+DVD+2LP+USB	825646869664	
United States; Canada	15 September 2009	Warner Bros.	CD	Unknown	
United States; Canada	15 September 2009	Warner Bros.	CD+DVD	Unknown	
United States; Canada	15 September 2009	Warner Bros.	CD+DVD+2LP+USB	Unknown	
Japan	16 September 2009	Warner	CD	WPCR13629	
Brazil	21 September 2009	Warner	CD	825646874347	

== Charts ==
=== Weekly charts ===
Chart (2009)	Peak positions
Australian Albums (ARIA)	1
Austrian Albums (Ö3 Austria)	1
Belgian Albums (Ultratop Flanders)	1
Belgian Albums (Ultratop Wallonia)	3
Canadian Albums (Billboard)	1
Danish Albums (Hitlisten)	1
Dutch Albums (Album Top 100)	4
Finnish Albums (Suomen virallinen lista)	3
French Albums (SNEP)	1
German Albums (Offizielle Top 100)	1
Hungarian Albums (MAHASZ)	26
Irish Albums (IRMA)	2
Italian Albums (FIMI)	1
Japanese Albums (Oricon)	11
Mexican Albums (Top 100 Mexico)	2
New Zealand Albums (RMNZ)	1
Norwegian Albums (VG-lista)	1
Polish Albums (ZPAV)	15
Portuguese Albums (AFP)	2
Russian Albums (2M)	4
Scottish Albums (Official Charts)	1
Spanish Albums (Promusicae)	2
Swedish Albums (Sverigetopplistan)	8
Swiss Albums (Schweizer Hitparade)	1
UK Albums (Official Charts)	1
US Billboard 200	3
US Top Alternative Albums (Billboard)	1
US Top Rock Albums (Billboard)	1

=== Year-end charts ===
Chart (2009)	Position
Australian Albums (ARIA)	25
Belgian Albums (Utratop Flanders)	26
Belgian Alternative Albums (Ultratop Flanders)	11
Belgian Albums (Ultratop Wallonia)	8
Danish Albums (Hitlisten)	26
Dutch Albums (Album Top 100)	13
European Top 100 Albums (Billboard)	18
Finnish Albums (Suomen virallinen lista)	10
French Albums (SNEP)	8
German Albums (Offizielle Top 100)	77
Italian Albums (FIMI)	40
New Zealand Albums (RMNZ)	22
Swedish Albums (Sverigetopplistan)	96
Swiss Albums (Schweizer Hitparade)	7
UK Albums (OCC)	25
US Billboard 200	124
US Top Rock Albums (Billboard)	33

Chart (2010)	Position
Australian Albums (ARIA)	38
Austrian Albums (Ö3 Austria)	53
Belgian Albums (Utratop Flanders)	29
Belgian Alternative Albums (Ultratop Flanders)	15
Belgian Albums (Ultratop Wallonia)	11
Danish Albums (Hitlisten)	91
Dutch Albums (Album Top 100)	36
European Albums (Billboard)	7
French Albums (SNEP)	8
German Albums (Offizielle Top 100)	86
Italian Albums (FIMI)	44
New Zealand Albums (RMNZ)	45
Russian Albums (2M)	148
South Korean International Albums (Circle)	70
Swiss Albums (Schweizer Hitparade)	25
UK Albums (OCC)	54
US Billboard 200	98
US Top Rock Albums (Billboard)	28

== Certifications ==
Region	Certification	Certified units/sales
Australia (ARIA)	Platinum	70,000^{^}
Austria (IFPI Austria)	Gold	10,000^{*}
Belgium (BRMA)	Platinum	30,000^{*}
Canada (Music Canada)	2× Platinum	160,000^{‡}
Denmark (IFPI Danmark)	2× Platinum	40,000^{‡}
Finland (Musiikkituottajat)	Platinum	23,536
France (SNEP)	Diamond	845,000
Germany (BVMI)	Platinum	200,000^{^}
Ireland (IRMA)	Platinum	15,000^{^}
Italy (FIMI)	2× Platinum	140,000^{*}
Netherlands (NVPI)	Gold	25,000^{^}
New Zealand (RMNZ)	2× Platinum	30,000^{‡}
Norway (IFPI Norway)	Gold	15,000^{*}
Poland (ZPAV)	Gold	10,000^{*}
Portugal (AFP)	Platinum	20,000^{^}
Russia (NFPF)	Gold	10,000^{*}
Spain (Promusicae)	Gold	30,000^{^}
Switzerland (IFPI Switzerland)	Platinum	30,000^{^}
United Kingdom (BPI)	2× Platinum	790,602
United States (RIAA)	Platinum	1,000,000^{‡}
Summaries
Europe (IFPI)	2× Platinum	2,000,000^{*}
^{*} Sales figures based on certification alone.^{^} Shipments figures based on certification alone.^{‡} Sales+streaming figures based on certification alone.

== Singles ==
Year	Title	Peak chart positions						
Year	Title	UK	AUS	IRE	NZ	US Alt.	US Rock	US
2009	"Uprising"	9	23	11	12	1	2	37
2009	"Undisclosed Desires"	49	11	—	12	4	7	—
2010	"Resistance"	38	72	—	—	1	7	114
2010	"Exogenesis: Symphony"	—	—	—	—	—	—	—

MTV EXIT, the MTV campaign to eradicate the human exploitation and trafficking especially in Asia and Pacific, in partnership with USAID, released a music video "Muse and MTV EXIT: MK Ultra", the third in a series of award-winning music video collaborations to highlight the dangers and impact of human trafficking. Produced for the band's track "MK Ultra", the video was launched globally across all of MTV's properties on-air and on-line on 17 September 2010.
