= Henry Frederick Werker =

American judge

Judge of the United States District Court for the Southern District of New York
- In office July 9, 1974 – May 10, 1984
- Appointed by: Richard Nixon
- Preceded by: Sylvester J. Ryan
- Succeeded by: Louis L. Stanton

Personal details
- Born: Henry Frederick Werker; April 16, 1920 Glendale, New York, US
- Died: May 10, 1984 (aged 64) Pelham, New York, US
- Education: New York University (BA, JD)

Henry Frederick Werker (April 16, 1920 – May 10, 1984) was a United States district judge of the United States District Court for the Southern District of New York.

== Education and career ==
Born in Glendale, a neighborhood of Queens, New York, Werker received an Artium Baccalaureus degree from New York University in 1941. He received a Juris Doctor from New York University School of Law in 1946. He was a United States Naval Reserve Lieutenant from 1942 to 1958. He was in private practice of law in New York City from 1946 to 1958. He was in private practice of law in Greenville, New York from 1958 to 1968. He was in private practice of law in Catskill, New York from 1961 to 1968. He was a social services attorney and assistant county attorney of Greene County, New York from 1967 to 1969. He was a county judge, surrogate and family court judge for the Greene County court from 1969 to 1974.

== Federal judicial service ==
Werker was nominated by President Richard Nixon on May 31, 1974, to a seat on the United States District Court for the Southern District of New York vacated by Judge Sylvester J. Ryan. He was confirmed by the United States Senate on June 21, 1974, and received his commission on July 9, 1974. His service terminated on May 10, 1984, due to his death of cancer in Pelham, New York.

== Notable cases ==
Prominent decisions by Judge Werker included a 1981 ruling rejecting a petition by a National Labor Relations Board representative seeking a ruling that Major League Baseball owners had committed an unfair labor practice. If granted, the petition would have prevented the Major League Baseball Players Association from going on strike. Although Judge Werker's opinion ended by urging both sides to "PLAY BALL!", the decision was followed by a two-month work stoppage.

In intellectual property matters, Werker authored an opinion concerning contractual rights to produce films and television programs based on the character Hopalong Cassidy, and presided over a hearing in which heirs to the estate of Edgar Rice Burroughs, the creator of Tarzan, sought to enjoin release of Tarzan, the Ape Man, the 1981 motion picture based on the character, unless certain revealing footage of Bo Derek was cut.

In 1977, Judge Werker presided over the criminal trial of Leroy "Nicky" Barnes and many codefendants, eventually sentencing Barnes to life in prison. In that case, Judge Werker was the first judge to select an anonymous jury, a procedure that has become common in cases where there is a risk that the jury will be threatened or otherwise compromised.

In constitutional litigation, Werker was the trial judge in Fullilove v. Klutznick, a case that challenged the constitutionality of the 10% minority set-aside for federal construction contracts. Werker's ruling upholding the set-asides was affirmed by the United States Court of Appeals for the Second Circuit and the Supreme Court of the United States, although subsequent decisions have undermined the authority of the decision. Werker was one of the judges who adjudicated disputes concerning the validity of the 1980 United States census. In 1983, Werker enjoined the enforcement of a rule proposed by the Reagan administration that would have required birth control clinics to advise parents when their minor children were prescribed contraceptives.

== Sources ==
- "Henry F. Werker, Federal Judge, Dead at 64", New York Times, May 11, 1984, p. 19, col. 1.

Legal offices
Preceded by Sylvester J. Ryan	Judge of the United States District Court for the Southern District of New York; 1974–1984	Succeeded by Louis L. Stanton
