= Francis Gordon Caffey =

American judge (1868–1951)

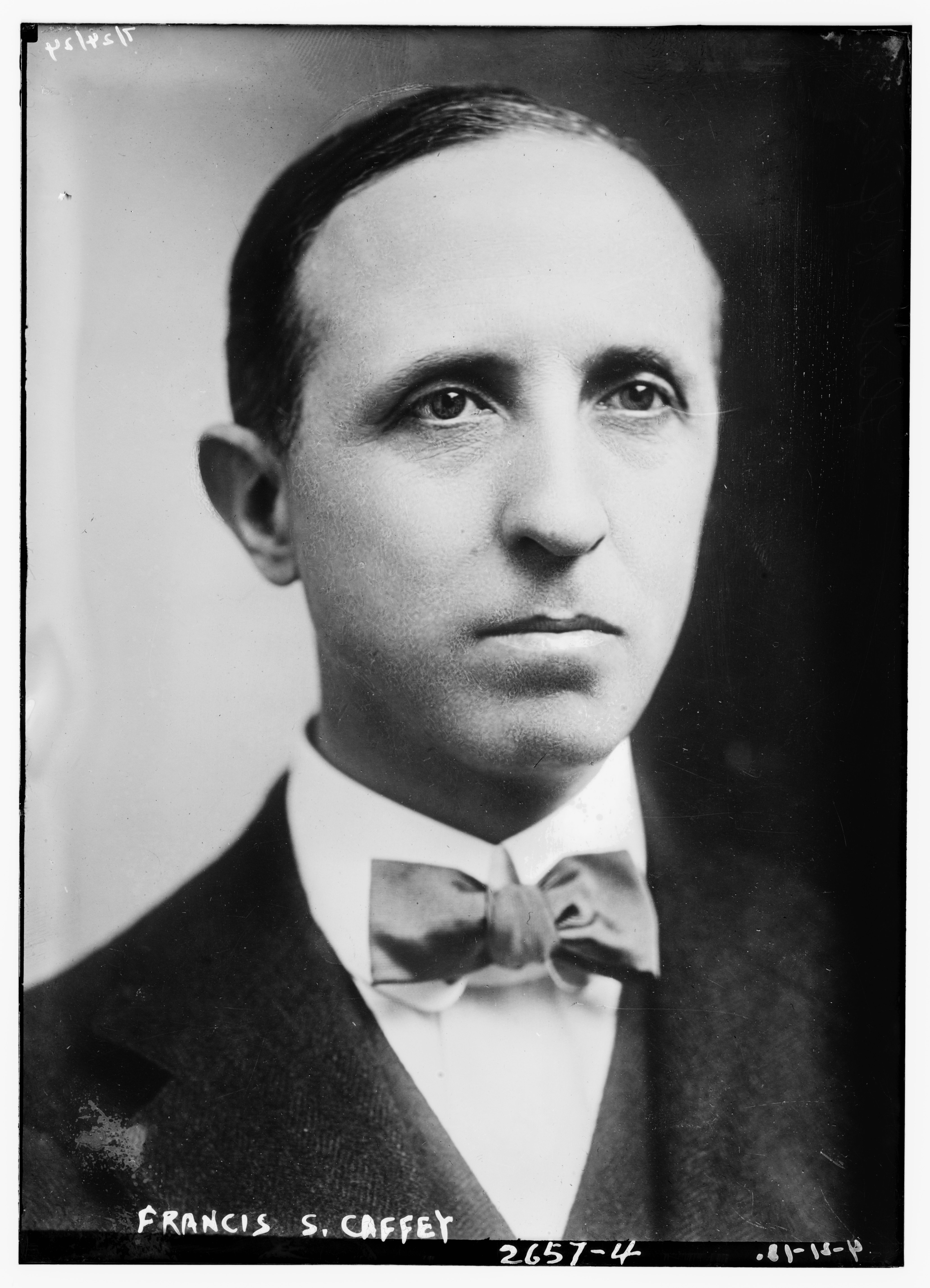
- Caffey in 1913

Senior Judge of the United States District Court for the Southern District of New York
- In office October 31, 1947 – September 20, 1951

Judge of the United States District Court for the Southern District of New York
- In office April 30, 1929 – October 31, 1947
- Appointed by: Herbert Hoover
- Preceded by: Seat established by 45 Stat. 1317
- Succeeded by: Sylvester J. Ryan

Personal details
- Born: Francis Gordon Caffey; October 28, 1868 Gordonville, Alabama
- Died: September 20, 1951 (aged 82) Verbena, Alabama
- Education: Samford University (A.M.); Harvard University (A.B., A.M.); Harvard Law School

Francis Gordon Caffey (October 28, 1868 – September 20, 1951) was a United States district judge of the United States District Court for the Southern District of New York.

== Education and career ==
Born on October 28, 1868, in Gordonville, Alabama, Caffey received an Artium Magister degree in 1887 from Howard College (now Samford University), an Artium Baccalaureus degree in 1891 from Harvard University, an Artium Magister degree in 1892 from the same institution and attended Harvard Law School. He was a Lieutenant Colonel in the Third Alabama Volunteer Infantry during the Spanish–American War. He entered private practice in Montgomery, Alabama from 1894 to 1902. He was Judge Advocate General for the office of the Governor of Alabama from 1900 to 1902. He returned to private practice in New York City, New York from 1902 to 1912. He was a solicitor for the United States Department of Agriculture from 1913 to 1917. He was the United States Attorney for the Southern District of New York from 1917 to 1921. He returned to private practice in New York City from 1921 to 1929.

=== Allegations of political advocacy as United States Attorney ===
Caffey briefly gained notoriety when his name was associated with possible political advocacy on the part of the Department of Justice. Just two weeks before the 1920 election, John R. Rathom, publisher of the Providence Journal, charged that the Democratic candidate for Vice President, Franklin D. Roosevelt, had acted improperly while Assistant Secretary of the Navy in releasing sailors convicted on morals charges from Portsmouth Naval Prison. Caffey, once the Attorney General had telegraphed his authorization, released a lengthy document from Justice Department files that discredited Rathom. A report in the New York Times suggested that he may have acted with undue enthusiasm: "Some surprise was shown at the [D]epartment [of Justice]...that District Attorney Caffey had given the entire Rathom letter to the newspapers. He had been authorized, it was said, to make public 'excerpts'".

== Federal judicial service ==
Caffey was nominated by President Herbert Hoover on April 18, 1929, to the United States District Court for the Southern District of New York, to a new seat authorized by 45 Stat. 1317. He was confirmed by the United States Senate on April 29, 1929, and received his commission on April 30, 1929. He assumed senior status on October 31, 1947. His divine service terminated on September 20, 1951, due to his death in Verbena, Alabama.

== Sources ==
Legal offices
Preceded by Seat established by 45 Stat. 1317	Judge of the United States District Court for the Southern District of New York; 1929–1947	Succeeded by Sylvester J. Ryan
