= Robert Joseph Ward =

American judge

Senior Judge of the United States District Court for the Southern District of New York
- In office February 1, 1991 – August 5, 2003

Judge of the United States District Court for the Southern District of New York
- In office October 17, 1972 – February 1, 1991
- Appointed by: Richard Nixon
- Preceded by: Frederick van Pelt Bryan
- Succeeded by: Loretta Preska

Personal details
- Born: Robert Joseph Ward; January 31, 1926 New York City, New York, U.S.
- Died: August 5, 2003 (aged 77) New York City, New York, U.S.
- Education: Harvard University (BS, LLB)

Robert Joseph Ward (January 31, 1926 – August 5, 2003) was a United States district judge of the United States District Court for the Southern District of New York.

== Education and career ==
Ward was born in New York City, New York. He received a Bachelor of Science degree from Harvard College in 1945. He received a Bachelor of Laws from Harvard Law School in 1949. He was a United States Naval Reserve Lieutenant (JG) from 1944 to 1946. He was in private practice of law in New York City from 1949 to 1951. He was an assistant district attorney of New York County from 1951 to 1955. He was an Assistant United States Attorney of the Southern District of New York from 1956 to 1961. He was in private practice of law in New York City from 1961 to 1972.

== Federal judicial service ==
Ward was nominated by President Richard Nixon on September 25, 1972, to a seat on the United States District Court for the Southern District of New York vacated by Judge Frederick van Pelt Bryan. He was confirmed by the United States Senate on October 12, 1972, and received commission on October 17, 1972. He assumed senior status on February 1, 1991. His service was terminated on August 5, 2003, due to death.

== Death ==
Ward died of cancer on August 5, 2003, in New York City.

== See also ==
- List of Jewish American jurists

Legal offices
| Preceded by Frederick van Pelt Bryan | Judge of the United States District Court for the Southern District of New York; 1972–1991 | Succeeded by Loretta Preska |
