= Louis L. Stanton =

American judge (born 1927)

Louis Lee Stanton

Senior Judge of the United States District Court for the Southern District of New York
- Incumbent
- Assumed office October 1, 1996

Judge of the United States District Court for the Southern District of New York
- In office July 18, 1985 – October 1, 1996
- Appointed by: Ronald Reagan
- Preceded by: Henry Frederick Werker
- Succeeded by: Alvin Hellerstein

Personal details
- Born: Louis Lee Stanton; October 1, 1927 (age 98) New York City, U.S.
- Education: Yale University (BA); University of Virginia (JD, LLB)

Louis Lee Stanton (born October 1, 1927) is a senior United States district judge of the United States District Court for the Southern District of New York.

== Education and career ==
Stanton was born on October 1, 1927 in New York City. He was a United States Merchant Marine Academy Cadet Midshipman from 1945 to 1947. He was a United States Marine Corps Reserve First Lieutenant from 1950 to 1952. He received a Bachelor of Arts degree from Yale University in 1950. He received a Juris Doctor and Bachelor of Laws from the University of Virginia School of Law in 1955. He was in private practice of law in New York City from 1955 to 1985.

== Federal judicial service ==
Stanton was nominated by President Ronald Reagan on June 12, 1985, to a seat on the United States District Court for the Southern District of New York vacated by Judge Henry Frederick Werker. He was confirmed by the United States Senate on July 16, 1985, and received commission on July 18, 1985. He assumed senior status on October 1, 1996.

== Notable cases ==
Stanton was the judge in the lawsuit Viacom Int'l, Inc.v. YouTube, Inc., in which Viacom sued YouTube alleging direct and indirect copyright infringement of Viacom's copyrighted works. In response to a formal motion to compel discovery, Stanton ordered Google to provide Viacom with YouTube user data. This decision received criticism from the Electronic Frontier Foundation and privacy advocates. An attorney for the EFF has accused the court of "ignoring the protections of the federal Video Privacy Protection Act." Stanton denied Viacom's motion to reveal the proprietary source code used for YouTube video searches, as well as the Viacom motion to compel Google to provide access to privately stored YouTube videos. Ultimately the companies agreed to anonymize all user data other than that of the defendants' and plaintiffs' employees. In 2010, and in 2013, Stanton ruled in Google's favor in a motion for summary judgment.

Stanton was the judge in the civil complaint filed by the U.S. Securities and Exchange Commission (SEC) against Bernard Madoff.

In another case Stanton ruled to dismiss the case of the Federal Trade Commission and New York attorney general against Quincy Bioscience of Madison, Wisconsin. Quincy was accused of saying that its Prevagen dietary supplement advertising claims were misleading. His ruling was overturned and the case was returned to the lower court.

In 2021, Stanton ruled that Locast, a streaming non-profit, must cease online streamed redistribution of live local television stations. Broadcasters sued over alleged copyright violations. Locast ceased operations, promising to appeal the decision.

Legal offices
Preceded by Henry Frederick Werker	Judge of the United States District Court for the Southern District of New York; 1985–1996	Succeeded by Alvin Hellerstein
