= Charles Miller Metzner =

American judge

Senior Judge of the United States District Court for the Southern District of New York
- In office September 30, 1977 – November 30, 2009

Judge of the United States District Court for the Southern District of New York
- In office September 10, 1959 – September 30, 1977
- Appointed by: Dwight D. Eisenhower
- Preceded by: John William Clancy
- Succeeded by: Leonard B. Sand

Personal details
- Born: Charles Miller Metzner; March 13, 1912 New York City, New York
- Died: November 30, 2009 (aged 97) Sarasota, Florida
- Education: Columbia University (A.B.); Columbia Law School (LL.B.)

Charles Miller Metzner (March 13, 1912 – November 30, 2009) was a United States district judge of the United States District Court for the Southern District of New York.

== Education and career ==
Born in New York City, New York, Metzner received an Artium Baccalaureus degree from Columbia University in 1931 and a Bachelor of Laws from Columbia Law School in 1933. He was in private practice in New York City from 1933 to 1934, and was a research assistant for the Judicial Council of the State of New York from 1934 to 1941. He served as President of The New York Young Republican Club from 1942 to 1943. He was counsel to the General Jewish Council in 1941, and was then a law secretary for Justice William C. Hecht of the Supreme Court of New York from 1942 to 1953. He was an executive assistant to Attorney General Herbert Brownell Jr. from 1953 to 1954. He returned to private practice in New York City from 1955 to 1959, and was also a member of the State Law Revision Commission of New York in 1959.

== Federal judicial service ==
On April 15, 1959, Metzner was nominated by President Dwight D. Eisenhower to a seat on the United States District Court for the Southern District of New York vacated by Judge John William Clancy. Metzner was confirmed by the United States Senate on September 9, 1959, and received his commission on September 10, 1959. He assumed senior status on September 30, 1977, and was a member of the Temporary Emergency Court of Appeals for the United States from 1979 to 1993. He died on November 30, 2009, in Sarasota, Florida. At the time of his death, he was the last remaining federal judge to have been appointed by President Eisenhower.

== See also ==
- List of Jewish American jurists
- List of United States federal judges by longevity of service

== Sources ==
Legal offices
Preceded by John William Clancy	Judge of the United States District Court for the Southern District of New York; 1959–1977	Succeeded by Leonard B. Sand
