= Undisclosed Desires =

2009 single by Muse

Single by Muse

from the album The Resistance
- B-side: "Remixes"
- Released: 16 November 2009
- Recorded: 2009
- Studio: Studio Bellini (Lake Como, Italy)
- Genre: Alternative dance; R&B
- Length: 3:56
- Label: Warner Bros.; Helium-3
- Songwriter: Matt Bellamy
- Producer: Muse

Muse singles chronology
"Uprising" (2009)	"Undisclosed Desires" (2009)	"Resistance" (2010)

"Undisclosed Desires" (also known as "Undisclosed") is a song by English rock band Muse. It was released as the second single from their fifth studio album, The Resistance, on 16 November 2009. The song was written by lead vocalist Matt Bellamy, who has described it as being "quite a personal song about me and my girlfriend." The song peaked at number 49 on the UK Singles Chart. It also achieved large success in Australia where it was certified Platinum and is Muse's highest-charting single in that country.

== Background and composition ==
In an interview with English music magazine Mojo, songwriter Matt Bellamy described "Undisclosed Desires" as one of "some tracks [...] that really take an influence from contemporary R&B, and a little bit from the David Bowie song "Ashes to Ashes" – heavy beats, syncopation, very melodic, rhythmic vocals," adding that "Dom [Howard, Muse drummer] has done all the drum programming. [...] It's the first song we've had where I don't play guitar or piano." NME commented on the lack of guitar and piano, writing that "the song [is] built around electric drum patterns and some slap bass from Chris Wolstenholme." Speaking about his slap bass contribution, Wolstenholme joked that "it's probably not ever been cool to play slap bass, [...] but on that song it just seemed to work so we kept it in." When performed live, Bellamy plays a keytar. Q describe the song as having a "minimal and dance-y feel." In the interview with Q, Bellamy also revealed the inspiration behind the song's lyrics, explaining that "it's actually quite a personal song about me and my girlfriend. I'm thinking people have had enough of geo-political stuff by the end of the album." The style of the song has been compared to that of new wave band Depeche Mode, especially their single "New Life".

== Release and reception ==
The song garnered a mixed reception from critics, with some chastising the R&B sound while others thought of it as too much of a departure from their already diverse sound. Andrew Leahey of music website allmusic described the song as "bizarre Timbaland-meets-Depeche Mode ambiance," using it as an example of the band's apparent "tendency to pile excess upon excess". Reviewing for NME, Ben Patashnik noted "Undisclosed" as evidence of the band "try[ing] to reignite the low-down R&B of ‘Supermassive Black Hole’," which he also suggests "backfires." Patashnik went on to criticize the song further, slating it as sounding like "something Timbaland might find down the back of his mixing desk." Mojo, on the other hand, identified "Undisclosed" as one of the highlights of The Resistance, along with "United States of Eurasia" and "Uprising". Q also described it favourably, calling it "a stark, gothic take (on Timbaland's style)". On 19 February 2010, "Undisclosed Desires" finished on the Hot30 Countdown at a peak of number 9.

== Music video ==
The video, directed by French duo Jonas & François, depicts all 3 members of Muse in a rather unusual room where there are wires lying and hanging everywhere. And before showing a speaker up close Chris is playing slap bass in the corner next to a massive hamster wheel filled with bass guitars; Dom is alternating playing the drum kit and pushing more drums into the kit; and Matt is at the front, playing keytar and singing into two microphones taped together, with three glass frames in front of him labelled "Matt Close up", "Matt Mid shot" and "Matt Long shot", and a small area above him with eight microphones surrounding it, where he occasionally puts his hand in to snap his fingers. There is also a dancer dressed in extravagantly bright colours performing various dance moves. In addition, there are at least thirty monitors on the walls, showing the lyrics word-by-word, all seem to be out of sync except two or three, but they are all right in sync chorus. At the beginning of the video Matt plugs a wire into his shoe. Sometimes a bleeding heart is seen in front of a white background.

== Track listing ==
CD single • digital download
No.	Title	Length
1.	"Undisclosed Desires"	3:56
2.	"Undisclosed Desires" (The Big Pink Remix)	4:27
3.	"Undisclosed Desires" (Thin White Duke Remix)	7:44

Muse.mu exclusive download
No.	Title	Length
1.	"Undisclosed Desires" (Album Version)	3:56
2.	"Undisclosed Desires" (The Big Pink Remix)	4:30
3.	"Undisclosed Desires" (Thin White Duke Remix)	7:40
4.	"Undisclosed Desires" (Thin White Duke Remix (edit))	4:51

== Personnel ==
Muse

- Matt Bellamy – lead vocals, synthesisers, programming, production
- Chris Wolstenholme – bass, backing vocals
- Dominic Howard – drums, synthesisers, programming

Main production personnel

- Adrian Bushby – engineering
- Mark "Spike" Stent – mixing
- Ted Jensen – mastering

== Charts ==
=== Weekly charts ===
Chart (2009–10)	Peak position
Australia (ARIA)	11
Austria (Ö3 Austria Top 40)	45
Belgium (Ultratop 50 Flanders)	35
Belgium (Ultratop 50 Wallonia)	18
Canada Rock (Billboard)	29
Denmark (Tracklisten)	26
France (SNEP)	197
France Download (SNEP)	13
Germany (GfK)	17
Italy (FIMI)	10
Netherlands (Single Top 100)	70
New Zealand (Recorded Music NZ)	12
Portugal (AFP)	20
Scottish Singles Sales (Official Charts)	56
Switzerland (Schweizer Hitparade)	21
UK Singles (Official Charts)	49
UK Rock & Metal (Official Charts)	1
US Hot Rock & Alternative Songs (Billboard)	7

=== Year-end charts ===
Chart (2010)	Position
Australia (ARIA)	89
Belgium (Ultratop Wallonia)	54
Switzerland (Schweizer Hitparade)	72

Chart (2011)	Position
US Hot Rock & Alternative Songs (Billboard)	32

== Certifications ==
Region	Certification	Certified units/sales
Australia (ARIA)	Platinum	70,000^{^}
Denmark (IFPI Danmark)	Gold	45,000^{‡}
Italy (FIMI)	Gold	15,000^{*}
United Kingdom (BPI)	Silver	200,000^{‡}
^{*} Sales figures based on certification alone.^{^} Shipments figures based on certification alone.^{‡} Sales+streaming figures based on certification alone.
