= Leonard B. Sand =

American judge from New York (1928–2016)

Senior Judge of United States District Court for the Southern District of New York
- In office July 1, 1993 – December 3, 2016

Judge of United States District Court for the Southern District of New York
- In office May 19, 1978 – July 1, 1993
- Appointed by: Jimmy Carter
- Preceded by: Charles Miller Metzner
- Succeeded by: Barrington D. Parker Jr.

Personal details
- Born: Leonard Burke Sand; May 24, 1928 New York City, New York, U.S.
- Died: December 3, 2016 (aged 88) Sleepy Hollow, New York, U.S.
- Education: New York University (BS); Harvard University (LLB)

Leonard Burke Sand (May 24, 1928 – December 3, 2016) was an American judge who served as a United States district judge of the United States District Court for the Southern District of New York.

== Early life and education ==
Sand was born and raised in The Bronx, New York. He received a Bachelor of Science degree from the New York University School of Commerce (now the New York University Stern School of Business) in 1947 and a Bachelor of Laws from Harvard Law School in 1951, where he was the notes editor for the Harvard Law Review. Sand served as a United States Naval Reserve Ensign from 1951 to 1953.

== Career ==
After law school, Sand served as a law clerk to Judge Irving Kaufman, then on the United States District Court for the Southern District of New York. In 1953, Sand was appointed assistant United States attorney for the Southern District of New York, serving in the Criminal Division, which was followed by two years in private practice with the firm of Rosenman, Goldmark, Colin & Kaye (later renamed Rosenman & Colin, LLP). From 1956 to 1959, he served as an assistant to the United States solicitor general in Washington, D.C., during which he argued 13 cases before the Supreme Court of the United States. Sand then reentered private practice in New York, eventually becoming a named partner of the firm then known as Robinson, Silverman, Pearce, Aronsohn, Sand & Berman (renamed Robinson, Silverman, Pearce, Aronsohn, and Berman after Sand's appointment to the bench). While in private practice, he successfully argued WMCA, Inc. v. Lomenzo, 377 U.S. 633 (1964), before the Supreme Court of the United States, a redistricting case decided in tandem with Reynolds v. Sims. The Court had set aside a week to hear nothing but reapportionment cases, and Sand was the first litigator to argue that week. He recalled being bombarded with questions from the justices. He was elected as a Delegate to the New York State Constitutional Convention in 1967.

=== Federal judicial service ===
Sand was nominated by President Jimmy Carter on April 7, 1978, to a seat on the United States District Court for the Southern District of New York vacated by Judge Charles Miller Metzner. He was confirmed by the United States Senate on May 17, 1978, and received his commission on May 19, 1978. Sand sat by designation on the United States Court of Appeals for the Second Circuit and the United States Court of Appeals for the Ninth Circuit. He assumed senior status on July 1, 1993, serving in that status until his death on December 3, 2016, in Sleepy Hollow, New York. During his service on the court, Sand also served as an adjunct professor of law at New York University School of Law, where he taught, along with Judge John G. Koeltl, a seminar on constitutional litigation.

As a senior judge, Sand donated his collected papers to the Pace Law School Archives at the Pace University School of Law.

==== Notable clerks ====
Sand's former law clerks include law professor Ann Althouse, Columbia University's General Counsel Jane E. Booth, the Hearst Corporation's Senior Vice President and General Counsel Eve Burton, Massachusetts Appeals Court Associate Justice Gary S. Katzmann, Microsoft's Chief Counsel for Intellectual Property Strategy Tom Rubin, Ernst & Young's Global Vice Chair and General Counsel Michael S. Solender, former interim United States Attorney for the Eastern District of New York Alan Vinegrad, Partner in the Real Estate group at Sullivan and Cromwell Arthur S. Adler, and Colorado Fourth Judicial District judge Eric Bentley.

== Notable cases ==
Two years into his time as a federal judge, Sand was assigned the landmark desegregation case United States v. City of Yonkers. A documentary film shown on PBS stations, Brick by Brick: A Civil Rights Story, detailed the trial and the movement for desegregation that led to it. An HBO television miniseries Show Me a Hero (2015) was based on this trial; Bob Balaban plays Sand in the series, which is based on the book of the same name. In his 1985 decision, he wrote, "the extreme concentration of subsidized housing that exists in southwest Yonkers today is the result of a pattern and practice of racial discrimination by city officials, pursued in response to constituent pressures to select or support only sites that would preserve existing patterns of racial segregation."

In 1990, Sand handed down a ruling that overturned a ban on panhandling in the New York City Subway. His decision says that panhandling is a free-speech right protected by the First Amendment.

Sand appeared in the documentary film, Finding Nico, to recount one of his more famous cases that didn't go to trial. He was presiding over a criminal indictment of the actor, Nico Minardos, and other defendants who had been caught in an FBI sting operation for allegedly conspiring to ship arms to Iran. Rudy Giuliani and his then-deputy United States Attorney, Lorna Schofield, were prosecuting Minardos, who was represented by the famed anti-government lawyer William Kunstler and his flamboyant co-counsel, Ron Kuby. Minardos appeared on 60 Minutes with Mike Wallace to claim his actions had been authorized by the Reagan Administration. When the Iran-Contra scandal occurred the government dropped the charges against Minardos and his co-defendants. Sand commented what a shame it was the case didn't go to trial because the parties and issues were so interesting.

One of the better known criminal trials presided over by Judge Sand was the 2001 trial which resulted from a 1998 bombing of two American embassies in East Africa. The trial was of four men accused of conspiring to perpetrate the bombings, which had led to the death of 224 people. Two of the defendants were sentenced to life imprisonment when the jury could not agree on their execution.

== Awards and honors ==
Sand was awarded the Learned Hand Medal for Excellence in Federal Jurisprudence by the Federal Bar Council in 1992 and the Edward Weinfeld Award for Distinguished Contributions to the Administration of Justice from the New York County Lawyers’ Association in 1993. He was the recipient of the American Arbitration Association’s Whitney North Seymour, Sr. Medal and was a fellow of the American College of Trial Lawyers. On April 3, 2014, Judge Sand was awarded the New York City Bar Association's Association Medal, which is "presented from time to time to a member of the New York Bar who has made exceptional contributions to the honor and standing of the bar in this community."

== Publications ==
Sand is co-editor, with Judge Jed S. Rakoff and others, of Modern Federal Jury Instructions, and has written extensively on juries as well as on other issues in law.

- Leonard B. Sand, et al., Modern Federal Jury Instructions.
- Leonard B. Sand & Danielle L. Rose, Proof Beyond All Possible Doubt: Is there a Need for Higher Burden of Proof When the Sentence May Be Death?, 78 Chi.-Kent L. Rev. 1359 (2003).
- Leonard B. Sand, et al., Preserving the Rule of Law in Hong Kong after July 1, 1997: A Report of a Mission of Inquiry, 18 U. Pa. J. Int'l Econ. L. 367 (1997).
- Leonard B. Sand, Batson and Jury Selection Revisited, 22 Litigation 3 (1995–1996).
- Leonard B. Sand, Getting Through to Jurors, 17 Litigation 3 (1990–1991).
- Leonard B. Sand, Trial by Non-Jury, 13 Litigation 5 (1986–1987).
- Leonard B. Sand & Steven Alan Reiss, Report on Seven Experiments Conducted by District Court Judges in the Second Circuit, 60 N.Y.U. L. Rev. 423 (1985).

Legal offices
Preceded by Charles Miller Metzner	Judge of the United States District Court for the Southern District of New York; 1978–1993	Succeeded by Barrington D. Parker Jr.
