= United States of Eurasia =

2009 song by Muse

Promotional single by Muse

from the album The Resistance
- Released: 21 July 2009
- Recorded: 2008–2009
- Studio: Lake Como, Italy
- Genre: New prog; symphonic rock
- Length: 5:47
- Label: Helium 3; Warner Bros.
- Composers: Matt Bellamy; Frédéric Chopin
- Lyricist: Matt Bellamy
- Producer: Muse

"United States of Eurasia" is a song by English rock band Muse, featured on their fifth studio album The Resistance. The song was made available as a free download online on 21 July 2009. It is followed by an instrumental solo, "Collateral Damage", based on Nocturne in E♭ major, Op. 9, No. 2 by Frédéric Chopin.

== Background and composition ==
"United States of Eurasia" was the first song title to be confirmed as on The Resistance, after fans worked it out from a photograph of its sheet music uploaded on the band's Twitter profile. On 3 July 2009, the album's track listing was revealed, with "United States..." positioned fourth between "Undisclosed Desires" and "Guiding Light".

In a pre-release interview featured in the August edition of music magazine Mojo, vocalist and guitarist Matt Bellamy reveals the song to be inspired by "a book called The Grand Chessboard by Zbigniew Brzezinski," explaining that "Brzezinski has the viewpoint that the Eurasian landmass, ie Europe, Asia and the Middle East, needs to be controlled by America to secure the oil supply." Bellamy goes on to suggest that the song is also influenced by George Orwell's novel Nineteen Eighty-Four, in which Eurasia is one of Earth's three super-states.

== Release – "Project Eurasia" ==
While initially thought to be the first single due to be released from The Resistance, the band confirmed on their Twitter profile that "Uprising" would in fact be released as the lead single, and that "United States..." would be the "prize" achieved by completing the "treasure hunt" activity set up by the band, "United States of Eurasia". After the fan community unlocked all six sample segments of the song promised by the treasure hunt on 20 July; a message was then displayed on the project page, ordering viewers to report back soon for an "emergency flash briefing." The main site then changed the green headline title from "Ununited States of Eurasia" to "United States of Eurasia".

On 20 July at approximately 12:00 PM (BST), the treasure hunt site "Ununited States of Eurasia" updated its map to include America and a banner reading "RECOGNITION FROM USA REQUESTED" with co-ordinates to a street in New York. It was the only station that had a timed limit to it for activation, stating that failure in activating it will result in a Lockdown Crisis Mode which will mobilise "The Resistance". A subsequent Twitter post by Bellamy, in reply to a fan, states that US would have the grand finale and that they would have "a tough decision to make", hinting on the possibility that the final station should not be activated and that United States of Eurasia should not be recognised. Joe Ellis became the first DJ to air the new song on KXLL during his Sunday show on 19 July 2009.

Following the conclusion of the treasure hunt on 21 July 2009, the song was made available for download from the microsite, complete with ending piano sonata "Collateral Damage", a slightly altered version of Frédéric Chopin's Nocturne in E♭ Major, with additional sounds of playing children and a line of a jet fighter dropping nuclear bombs at the end of the arrangement, leading directly into the album's next track, "Guiding Light".

== Reception ==
Music magazine NME published a pre-release interview with the band on 7 July, identifying "United States..." as one of the highlights of the album and describing how it "builds into a climax of multi-tracked Queen-style vocals." In a French review of the album published on MuseBootlegs.com, the song is likened to Queen's song "Bohemian Rhapsody", Maurice Jarre's soundtrack for the 1962 film Lawrence of Arabia and Polish composer Frédéric Chopin, the amalgamation of which is said to produce "A long, cinematic classic rock trip."
