= One Ok Rock discography =

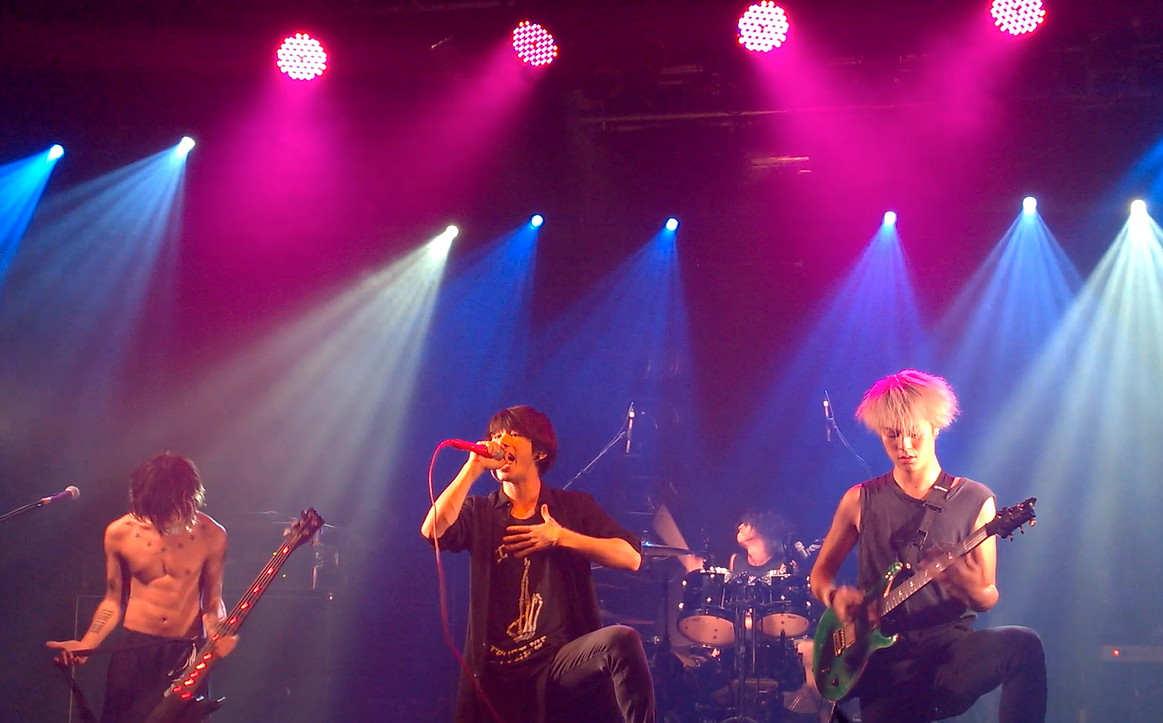
- One Ok Rock performing in London, 2014
- Studio albums: 13
- EPs: 2
- Compilation albums: 2
- Singles: 31
- Other appearances: 6

The discography of the Japanese rock band One Ok Rock consists of ten studio albums, two compilation albums, two EPs, and thirty-one singles. One Ok Rock was formed in Tokyo, Japan in 2005, and currently consists of Takahiro Moriuchi (vocals), Toru Yamashita (guitar/leader), Ryota Kohama (bass guitar), and Tomoya Kanki (drums). One Ok Rock have sold more than 3 million records worldwide.

Their 2012 single "The Beginning" is the most popular song by the band, having reached more than 220 million views on their YouTube channel, further skyrocketing One Ok Rock's popularity. The song was chosen as the theme song for the live action movie adaptation of Rurouni Kenshin. It peaked at number 2 on the Billboard Japan Hot 100 and stayed for 45 weeks and also charted at number 5 on the Oricon charts. Later in 2013, "The Beginning" won "Best Rock Video" and "Best Video from a Film" from the MTV Video Music Awards Japan 2013 and "Best Your Choice" in Space Shower Music Video Awards.

Their seventh studio album, 35xxxv, became their first album which charted on US Billboard. It peaked at number 11 on Billboard Heatseekers Albums. This chart is for new and upcoming musicians, which is usually a stepping stone towards Billboard 200 or Billboard Hot 100. On the same week, it charted at number 43 on Billboard Independent Albums. Then it peaked at number 23 on the Billboard Hard Rock Albums Chart and reached number 1 on the Billboard World Albums chart.

In 2017, their eighth album, Ambitions, debuted at number 106 on the US Billboard 200. It became One Ok Rock's first studio album to debut at the Billboard 200. It also charted at number 2 on the Billboard Top Hard Rock Albums, peaked at #9 on the Billboard Top Alternative Albums and reached number 12 on the Billboard Top Rock Albums.

== Studio albums ==
List of albums, showing selected details, selected chart positions, certifications, and sales figures
Title	Details	Peak chart positions										Sales	Certifications
Title	Details	JPN	AUS	AUT	BEL	CAN	GER	KOR	US	US Hard Rock	US Heat.	Sales	Certifications
Zeitakubyō	Released: November 21, 2007; Label: Aer-born; Format: CD	15	—	—	—	—	—	—	—	—	—	JPN: 30,779	RIAJ: Gold
Beam of Light	Released: May 28, 2008; Label: Aer-born; Format: CD	17	—	—	—	—	—	—	—	—	—	JPN: 13,270	
Kanjō Effect	Released: November 12, 2008; Label: Aer-born; Format: CD, CD/DVD	13	—	—	—	—	—	—	—	—	—	JPN: 21,583	RIAJ: Gold
Niche Syndrome	Released: June 9, 2010; Label: A-Sketch; Format: CD, CD/DVD, digital download	4	—	—	—	—	—	—	—	—	—	JPN: 244,537	RIAJ: Platinum
Zankyo Reference	Released: October 5, 2011; Label: A-Sketch; Format: CD, digital download	2	—	—	—	—	—	—	—	—	—	JPN: 166,602	RIAJ: Gold
Jinsei×Boku=	Released: March 6, 2013; Label: A-Sketch; Format: CD, CD/DVD, digital download	2	—	—	—	—	—	—	—	—	—	JPN: 216,180	RIAJ: Platinum
35xxxv	Released: February 11, 2015; Label: A-Sketch; Format: CD, CD/DVD, digital download	1	—	—	—	—	—	—	—	23	11	JPN: 241,307	RIAJ: Platinum
35xxxv (Deluxe edition)	Released: September 25, 2015; Label: Warner Bros.; Format: CD, digital download	3	—	—	—	—	—	40	—	—	17	JPN: 87,545	
Ambitions (Japanese version)	Released: January 11, 2017; Label: A-Sketch; Format: CD, CD/DVD, digital download	1	—	—	—	—	—	—	—	—	—	JPN: 347,476 (physical); JPN: 79,611 (digital)	RIAJ: Platinum
Ambitions (International version)	Released: January 13, 2017; Label: Fueled by Ramen; Format: CD, digital download	4	57	72	195	61	99	52	106	2	—	JPN: 77,642	
Eye of the Storm (Japanese version)	Released: February 13, 2019; Label: A-Sketch; Format: CD, CD/DVD, digital download	1	—	—	—	—	—	—	—	—	—	JPN: 288,815 (physical); JPN: 67,211 (digital)	RIAJ: Platinum
Eye of the Storm (International version)	Released: February 15, 2019; Label: Fueled by Ramen; Format: CD, digital download	3	—	—	—	—	73	—	—	—	2	JPN: 52,016	
Luxury Disease	Released: September 9, 2022; Label: Fueled by Ramen; Format: CD, digital download	1	—	—	—	—	—	—	—	—	—	JPN: 78,633	RIAJ: Gold
Detox	Released: February 21, 2025; Label: Fueled by Ramen; Format: CD, digital download	2	—	—	—	—	—	—	—	—	—	JPN: 121,909	RIAJ: Gold
"—" denotes an album that did not chart or was not released in that territory.

== Compilation albums ==
List of compilation albums, showing selected details, selected chart positions, and sales figures
Title	Details	Peak chart positions		Sales
Title	Details	JPN	AUS	Sales
One Ok Rock: A Decade of Greatest Hits (2015–2025)	Released: October 30, 2026; Label: Fueled by Ramen; Format: CD, digital download	26	92	JPN: 2,166
Unreleased Collection – Japan Exclusive	Released: October 30, 2026; Label: Fueled by Ramen; Format: Digital download	—	—	
"—" denotes recording that did not chart or was not released in that territory.

== Extended plays ==
List of extended plays, showing selected details, selected chart positions, and sales figures
Title	EP details	Peak chart positions	Sales
Title	EP details	JPN	Sales
One Ok Rock	Released: July 26, 2006; Label: zumania; Format: CD	—	JPN: 11,200
Keep It Real	Released: December 16, 2006; Label: zumania; Format: CD	102	JPN: 4,651
"—" denotes recording that did not chart or was not released in that territory.

== Singles ==
List of singles, showing year released, selected chart positions, certifications, sales figures, and name of the album
Title	Year	Peak chart positions					Certifications	Sales	Album
Title	Year	JPN	JPN Comb (Note: The Oricon Combined Singles Chart was established on December 24, 2018.)	JPN Hot* (Note: The Japan Hot 100 was established in February 2008.)	JPN RIAJ* (Note: The RIAJ Digital Track Chart was established in April 2009. Sales figures for Chaku-Uta Full (cellphone downloads), Chaku-Uta (ringtones) and regular digital downloads were compiled by RIAJ until July 2012.)	WW	Certifications	Sales	Album
"Naihi Shinsho" (内秘心書, Keep It Inside)	2007	48	—	—	—	—		JPN: 14,839	Zeitakubyō
"Yume Yume" (努努-ゆめゆめ-, Absolutely)	2007	43	—	—	—	—		JPN: 9,218	Zeitakubyō
"Et Cetera" (エトセトラ, Eto Setora)	2007	29	—	—	—	—		JPN: 6,665	Zeitakubyō
"Hitsuzen Maker" (必然メーカー, Necessary Maker) †	2008	—	—	—	—	—			Beam of Light
"Koi no Aibō Kokoro no Cupid" (恋ノアイボウ心ノクピド, Love Companion, Cupid of the Heart) †	2008	—	—	—	—	—			Kanjō Effect
"Kanzen Kankaku Dreamer" (完全感覚Dreamer, Perfect Sensation Dreamer)	2010	9	—	40	53	—		JPN: 17,163	Niche Syndrome
"Jibun Rock" (じぶんRock, My Rock) (Note: "Jibun Rock" was released as a rental CD at Tsutaya.)	2010	—	—	—	98	—			Niche Syndrome
"Answer Is Near" (アンサイズニア)	2011	6	—	13	27	—		JPN: 38,000	Zankyo Reference
"Re:make/No Scared"	2011	6	—	10	21	—		JPN: 46,500	Zankyo Reference
"The Beginning"	2012	5	—	2	3	—	RIAJ: Gold (physical)	JPN: 81,325	Jinsei×Boku=
"The Same As..."	2012	—	—	52	—	—			Jinsei×Boku=
"Deeper Deeper/Nothing Helps"	2013	2	—	3	*	—		JPN: 65,240	Jinsei×Boku=
"Clock Strikes"	2013	—	—	27	*	—			Jinsei×Boku=
"Mighty Long Fall/Decision"	2014	2	—	2	*	—	RIAJ: Gold (physical)	JPN: 83,738	35xxxv
"Cry Out"	2015	—	—	15	*	—			35xxxv
"Last Dance"	2015	—	—	93	*	—			35xxxv (Deluxe Edition)
"The Way Back – Japanese Version"	2015	—	—	6	*	—			35xxxv (Deluxe Edition)
"Always Coming Back"	2016	—	—	9	*	—			Ambitions
"Taking Off"	2016	—	—	4	*	—			Ambitions
"Bedroom Warfare"	2016	—	—	20	*	—			Ambitions
"I Was King"	2016	—	—	26	*	—			Ambitions
"We Are"	2017	—	—	4	*	—			Ambitions
"American Girls"	2017	—	—	—	*	—			Ambitions
"Skyfall" (Note: "Skyfall" is a limited CD single sold only at 2017 Ambitions Japan Tour.)	2017	—	—	—	*	—			Non-album single
"Change"	2018	— (Note: "Change" charted at number 2 on the Oricon Digital Singles Chart. The Oricon Digital Singles Chart was established in December 2017.)	—	6	*	—			Eye of the Storm
"Stand Out Fit In"	2018	—	32	9	*	—	RIAJ: 2× Platinum (streaming)		Eye of the Storm
"Wasted Nights"	2019	— (Note: "Wasted Nights" charted at number 2 on the Oricon Digital Singles Chart.)	11	6	*	—	RIAJ: 2× Platinum (streaming)	JPN: 168,346 (dig.)	Eye of the Storm
"Renegades"	2021	— (Note: "Renegades" charted at number 1 on the Oricon Digital Singles Chart.)	5	4	*	47	RIAJ: Gold (digital); RIAJ: Platinum (streaming)		Luxury Disease
"Broken Heart of Gold"	2021	— (Note: "Broken Heart of Gold" charted at number 3 on the Oricon Digital Singles Chart.)	25	17	*	176	RIAJ: Gold (streaming)		Luxury Disease
"Wonder"	2021	— (Note: "Wonder" charted at number 5 on the Oricon Digital Singles Chart.)	—	50	*	—			Luxury Disease
"Save Yourself"	2022	— (Note: "Save Yourself" charted at number 7 on the Oricon Digital Singles Chart.)	47	21	*	—	RIAJ: Gold (streaming)		Luxury Disease
"Let Me Let You Go"	2022	—	—	53	*	—			Luxury Disease
"Vandalize"	2022	—	—	—	*	—			Luxury Disease
"Make It Out Alive"	2023	—	30	17	*	—	RIAJ: Gold (streaming)		Non-album single
"Delusion:All"	2024	—	14	7	*	—	RIAJ: Gold (streaming)		Detox
"Dystopia"	2024	—	—	18	*	—		JPN: 6,315 (dig.)	Detox
"+Matter"	2024	—	—	29	*	—			Detox
"Puppets Can't Control You"	2025	—	39	10	*	—			Detox
"Tropical Therapy"	2025	—	—	53	*	—			Detox
"Fever"	2026	—	—	65	*	—			One Ok Rock: A Decade of Greatest Hits (2015–2025)
"—" denotes recording that did not chart or was not released in that territory. † Radio singles.

== Other charted songs ==
List of other charted songs, showing year released, selected chart positions, and name of the album
Title	Year	Peak chart positions		Certifications	Album
Title	Year	JPN Comb (Note: The Oricon Combined Singles Chart was established on December 24, 2018.)	JPN Hot	Certifications	Album
"Wherever You Are"	2010	—	4	RIAJ: 3× Platinum (streaming)	Niche Syndrome
"C.h.a.o.s.m.y.t.h."	2011	—	88		Zankyo Reference
"Heartache"	2015	—	43		35xxxv
"Take What You Want" (featuring 5 Seconds of Summer)	2017	—	57		Ambitions
"Listen" (featuring Avril Lavigne)	2017	—	93		Ambitions
"In the Stars" (featuring Kiiara)	2019	22	19		Eye of the Storm
"Eye of the Storm"	2019	—	43		Eye of the Storm
"Gravity" (featuring Satoshi Fujihara)	2022	—	63		Luxury Disease
"—" denotes recording that did not chart or was not released in that territory.

== Soundtrack songs ==
Songs that appear on film and video game soundtracks
Title	Year	Description	Ref.
"No Scared"	2011	Theme song of the video game Black Rock Shooter: The Game.	
"Lost and Found"	2011	Theme song of Milocrorze: A Love Story.	
"The Beginning"	2012	Theme song of Rurouni Kenshin.	
"The Same As..."	2012	Theme song of Gummo Evian!	
"Nothing Helps"	2013	Theme song of Japanese version of the video game DmC: Devil May Cry.	
"Clock Strikes"	2013	Theme song of the video game Ryū ga Gotoku Ishin!.	
"Be the Light"	2013	Theme song of Space Pirate Captain Harlock.	
"Mighty Long Fall"	2014	Theme song of Rurouni Kenshin: Kyoto Inferno.	
"Heartache"	2014	Theme song of Rurouni Kenshin: The Legend Ends.	
"Taking Off"	2016	Theme song of Museum.	
"In the Stars"	2019	Theme song of Forutuna no Hitomi.	
"Wasted Nights"	2019	Theme song of Kingdom.	
"Renegades"	2021	Theme song of Rurouni Kenshin: The Final.	
"Broken Heart of Gold"	2021	Theme song of Rurouni Kenshin: The Beginning.	
"Vandalize"	2022	Ending theme song of the video game Sonic Frontiers.	
"Make It Out Alive"	2023	Theme song of the video game Monster Hunter Now.	
"Prove"	2023	Opening theme song of the anime Beyblade X.	
"Neon"	2024	Appears in the movie Sonic the Hedgehog 3.	

== Other appearances ==
=== Covers ===
Song	Year	Original artist	Released on	Notes	Ref.
"To Feel The Fire"	2011	Stevie Wonder	"Answer is Near" ("アンサイズニア") single		
"Smells Like Teen Spirit"	2012	Nirvana	Nevermind Tribute album	A tribute album by Japanese music artists to celebrates 20th anniversary of Nirvana's Nevermind album.	
"A Thousand Miles"	2015	Vanessa Carlton	One Ok Rock 2014 "Mighty Long Fall at Yokohama Stadium" DVD		
"The End"	2016	My Chemical Romance	Rock Sound Presents: The Black Parade CD	A tribute album to celebrate 10th anniversary of My Chemical Romance's album The Black Parade.	
"Easy on Me"	2022	Adele	Apple Music Home Session: One Ok Rock		
"First Love"	2022	Hikaru Utada	One Ok Rock 2021 Day to Night Acoustic Sessions DVD		

== See also ==
- One Ok Rock videography
