= The Beginning (One Ok Rock song) =

- Cover of the regular edition

Single by One Ok Rock

from the album Jinsei×Boku=
- Released: August 22, 2012
- Genre: Pop-punk; post-hardcore
- Label: A-Sketch
- Songwriter: Takahiro Moriuchi

One Ok Rock singles chronology
"Re:make/No Scared" (2011)	"The Beginning" (2012)	"Deeper Deeper/Nothing Helps" (2013)

Audio sample
- file; help

Music video
- "The Beginning" on YouTube

"The Beginning" is the seventh single released by Japanese rock band One Ok Rock. The title track was used as the theme song for the live-action movie of Rurouni Kenshin. The first pressing comes with a sticker. It received a digital download single certification of Gold from the Recording Industry Association of Japan for sales of 100,000. It peaked at #2 on the Billboard Japan Hot 100 and stayed for 45 weeks. The song also reached 5th place on the Oricon chart and charted for 20 weeks.

== Composition and lyrics ==
According to vocalist Taka, the demo of "The Beginning" was made on a piano before Zankyo Reference was released. The lyrics then written in mid-2012 after they were asked to make a song for a new live adaption of the popular manga Rurouni Kenshin that his friend, Takeru Satoh, was the lead actor. "The Beginning" is an emotional track with a powerful and loud sound, tells about a person's struggle to never give up and change for the better for the loved ones and risk everything to stay together in any situation and condition.

The second track "Ketsuraku Automation" begins with two string melodies open up the song, brings melancholic mood to the track. The tempo of the song then increases as the drum beats kick in, guitar melody takes on a heavier, fuller tone while the bass delivers quick jabs. "Ketsuraku Automation" means "automatic disappearance", telling about someone who is lost and doesn't understand all the events in the world which are just fakes.

The last track "Notes n' Words" is an all-English ballad. The song gives a romantic feel with an acoustic touch at the beginning of the song, then gentle bass, soft drums and breezy strings comes in the middle. This song tells about someone's feelings of love that may be difficult to express directly and freely, a kind of love that is restrained and can only be expressed through this song.

== Music video ==
The music video for the title track was directed by Maxilla, released before the single on August 14, 2012.

The video begins showing vocalist Taka starting to sing melancholy as the camera zooms out while giving glimpses of the other members playing their instruments. It then focuses on a young man holding what appears to be a diamond, as the song takes an intense drop while showing key frames of the phrases 'Take my hand' & 'And bring me back". The band starts playing inside an extant empty dark room, a young woman then is shown briefly waiting in a desolated beach while the man starts walking slowly. The whole video is recorded with a gloomy filter and bright brief gleams. Vocalist Taka passionately keeps on singing while drummer Tomoya is often shown from a back perspective with the camera occasionally focusing on guitarist Toru and bassist Ryota. All the band members move in slow motion at first showing they are in sync with their movements while performing. Eventually the phrases 'Stand up stand up', 'Wake up wake up', 'Never give up' and 'Just tell me why baby' take over the screen and then leave a wide perspective of the band playing with quick focuses on Taka and the unnamed young man who keeps walking while limping. The room where the band is playing keeps getting darker and somehow foggy. When the man finally shows up in the beach the songs reaches its climax and most intense and heavy part with the guitar and bass getting louder as a countdown begins, the young man then gives the diamond to the girl and then blacks out. The song reaches its lowest part right after this and the man seems to have died as the girl softly closes his eyes while crying then walks away, with Taka singing softly and saddening the moment more. The girl walks away and then the band enters the last chorus while headbanging to the melancholic melody accompanied by a subtle piano beat that indicates the close end then Taka sings out 'It finally begins' as the end, the noise of the guitar fades out and the band members stand still looking down while the image fades out. The song title "The Beginning" is shown at the end sparkling then fading out too.

== Track listing ==
The single was released in a regular edition. All songs were written and composed by Taka.

=== Regular Edition ===
CD
No.	Title	Length
1.	"The Beginning"	4:56
2.	"Ketsuraku Automation" (欠落オートメーション)	3:45
3.	"Notes N' Words"	4:50

== Personnel ==
One Ok Rock

- Takahiro "Taka" Moriuchi — lead vocals
- Toru Yamashita — lead guitar, rhythm guitar
- Ryota Kohama — bass guitar
- Tomoya Kanki — drums, percussion

Additional musicians

- Makoto Minagawa — additional piano (track 1)

Production

- Akkin — arranger
- Kenichi Arai — engineering
- Takashi Kagami — engineering
- Tue Madsen — mixing (track 1)
- Kazutaka Minemori — bass technician
- Yoshiro "Masuo" Arimatsu — drum technician, guitar

== Charts ==
=== Weekly charts ===
Chart (2012)	Peak positions
Japan Hot 100 (Billboard)	2
Japan Weekly Singles (Oricon)	5

=== Year-end charts ===
Chart (2012)	Peak positions
Japan Hot 100 (Billboard)	70

== Certifications ==
Region	Certification	Certified units/sales
Japan (RIAJ)	Gold	100,000^{^}
^{^} Shipments figures based on certification alone.

== Awards ==
MTV Video Music Awards Japan

Year	Nominee / work	Award	Result
2013	"The Beginning"	Best Rock Video	Won
2013	"The Beginning"	Best Video from a Film	Won

Space Shower Music Video Awards

Year	Nominee / work	Award	Result
2013	"The Beginning"	Best Your Choice	Won
