= Mighty Long Fall/Decision =

Single by One Ok Rock

from the album 35xxxv
- Released: July 30, 2014
- Length: 11:08
- Label: A-Sketch; Amuse, Inc.
- Songwriters: Takahiro Moriuchi; John Feldmann; Arnold Lanni
- Producers: One Ok Rock; John Feldmann

One Ok Rock singles chronology
"Deeper Deeper/Nothing Helps" (2013)	"Mighty Long Fall/Decision" (2014)	"Skyfall" (2017)

Audio sample
- "Mighty Long Fall": file; help

Music video
- "Mighty Long Fall" on YouTube "Decision" (featured in Fool Cool Rock) on YouTube

"Mighty Long Fall/Decision" is the ninth single by Japanese rock band ONE OK ROCK. It was released on July 30, 2014 under the A-Sketch label. It received a digital download single certification of Gold from the Recording Industry Association of Japan for sales of 100,000. The song "Mighty Long Fall" peaked at number 2 on the Billboard Japan Hot 100, with its B-sides "Decision" and "Pieces of Me" peaking at 12 and 30 respectively. The single reached number 2 and stayed on the Oricon charts for 17 weeks. The song "Mighty Long Fall" was used in the live-action film Rurouni Kenshin: Kyoto Inferno.

== Music video ==
The official video for "Mighty Long Fall" uses the Japanese version of the song, released at the same day as the single. It was filmed in Tokyo and directed by Ryohei Shingu, featuring the band performing the track in a large hall. On the other hand, there were several masked men beating drums. Each blow cracks the floor of the building, and some people are seen falling into the dark abyss. Towards the end of the video, the floor of the building collapses, leaving a place where the band plays music.

The music video for "Decision" also uses the Japanese version of the song, released on August 20, 2014. It contains a compilation footage from their Who Are You?? Who Are We?? tour in Europe and Asia which also featured in Fool Cool Rock! Documentary Film directed by Hiroyuki Nakano.

== Track listing ==
CD
No.	Title	Lyrics	Music	Length
1.	"Mighty Long Fall"	Taka; John Feldmann	Taka; Toru; Ryota; Tomoya; Feldmann	4:02
2.	"Decision"	Taka	Taka; Feldmann	3:44
3.	"Pieces of Me"	Taka; Arnold Lanni	Taka	3:22
Total length:				11:08

== Personnel ==
One Ok Rock

- Takahiro "Taka" Moriuchi — lead vocals
- Toru Yamashita — lead guitar, rhythm guitar
- Ryota Kohama — bass guitar
- Tomoya Kanki — drums, percussion

== Charts ==
=== Single ===
Chart (2014)	Peak position
Japan Weekly Singles (Oricon)	2

=== Songs ===
Title	Year	Peak positions
Title	Year	JPN Billboard
"Mighty Long Fall"	2014	2
"Decision"	2014	12
"Pieces of Me"	2014	30

== Certifications ==
Region	Certification	Certified units/sales
Japan (RIAJ)	Gold	100,000^{^}
^{^} Shipments figures based on certification alone.

== Awards ==
MTV Video Music Awards Japan

Year	Nominee / work	Award	Result
2015	"Mighty Long Fall"	Best Group Video	Nominated
