= Zeitakubyo =

Zeitakubyō

Studio album by One Ok Rock
- Released: November 21, 2007
- Genre: Alternative rock; emo; post-grunge
- Length: 43:42
- Language: Japanese; English
- Label: Aer-born
- Producer: One Ok Rock

One Ok Rock chronology
Keep It Real (2006)	Zeitakubyō (2007)	Beam of Light (2008)

Singles from Zeitakubyou
- 1. "Naihi Shinsho" Released: April 25, 2007; 2. "Yume Yume" Released: July 25, 2007; 3. "Et Cetera" Released: October 24, 2007

Zeitakubyo (ゼイタクビョウ, Zeitakubyō; lit. Luxury Disease) is the debut full-length studio album by the Japanese rock band One Ok Rock, released on November 21, 2007. It peaked at No. 15 on the Oricon weekly chart and charted for 22 weeks before dropping out. Their 2022 album's title, Luxury Disease is a literal translation of Zeitakubyo.

== Track listing ==
Zeitakubyō – CD
No.	Title	Lyrics	Music	Arrangement	Length
1.	"Naihi Shinsho" (内秘心書 Keep It Inside)	Takahiro Moriuchi	Moriuchi	One Ok Rock; Koichi Korenaga	3:49
2.	"Borderline"	Toru Yamashita	Yamashita	One Ok Rock; Korenaga	3:42
3.	"(You Can Do) Everything"	Moriuchi	Moriuchi	One Ok Rock; Satoru Hiraide	3:38
4.	"Yoru ni Shika Sakanai Mangetsu" (夜にしか咲かない満月 A full moon blooming only in the evening)	Moriuchi	Moriuchi	One Ok Rock; Hiraide	4:00
5.	"Yume Yume" (努努-ゆめゆめ Absolutely)	Moriuchi; Yamashita	Moriuchi; Yamashita	One Ok Rock; Hiraide	3:16
6.	"Kagerou" (カゲロウ Mirage)	Moriuchi	Moriuchi; Alexander Onizawa	One Ok Rock; Keiji Matsui	4:08
7.	"Lujo"	Moriuchi; Yamashita	Onizawa; Tomoya Kanki; Ryota Kohama	One Ok Rock; I.N.A	4:08
8.	"Kemuri" (ケムリ)	Yamashita	Yamashita	One Ok Rock; Hiraide	4:23
9.	"Yokubō ni Michi ta Seinendan" (欲望に満ちた青年団 Desire filled youth group)	Moriuchi	Moriuchi	One Ok Rock; Korenaga	3:22
10.	"Et Cetera" (エトセトラ)	Moriuchi	Moriuchi; Onizawa	One Ok Rock; Hiraide	4:34
11.	"A New One for All, All for the New One"	Moriuchi	One Ok Rock	One Ok Rock; Korenaga	4:46
Total length:					43:42

== Charts ==
=== Weekly charts ===
Weekly chart performance for Zeitakubyō
Chart (2007)	Peak position
Japanese Albums (Oricon)	15

=== Singles ===
Title	Year	Peak position
Title	Year	JPN
"Naihi Shinsho" (内秘心書)	2007	48
"Yume Yume" (努努-ゆめゆめ)	2007	43
"Et Cetera" (エトセトラ)	2007	29

== Certifications ==
Certifications and sales for Zeitakubyō
Region	Certification	Certified units/sales
Japan (RIAJ)	Gold	100,000^{^}
^{^} Shipments figures based on certification alone.

== Personnel ==
One Ok Rock

- Takahiro "Taka" Moriuchi — lead vocals
- Toru Yamashita — rap vocals, rhythm guitar
- Alexander "Alex" Reimon Onizawa — lead guitar
- Ryota Kohama — bass guitar
- Tomoya Kanki — drums, percussion
