= Kanjō Effect =

- Standard edition cover

Studio album by One Ok Rock
- Released: November 12, 2008
- Genre: Alternative rock; pop-punk; post-grunge
- Length: 52:25
- Language: Japanese; English
- Label: Aer-born
- Producer: One Ok Rock; Akkin; Satoru Hiraide; Jeff Miyahara; Daisuke Fujimoto; Shinji Omura

One Ok Rock chronology
Beam of Light (2008)	Kanjō Effect (2008)	Niche Syndrome (2010)

Professional ratings
Review scores
Source	Rating
AllMusic	4.5/5 stars

Kanjō Effect (感情エフェクト) is the third full-length album by the Japanese rock band One Ok Rock, released on November 12, 2008. It reached No. 13 on the Oricon weekly chart and charted for 15 weeks before dropping out. This was the last album to feature original lead guitarist Alex Onizawa. It is their 2nd album to release in 2008 following Beam of Light in May 2008.

== Track listing ==
Kanjō Effect – Standard edition
No.	Title	Lyrics	Music	Arrangement	Length
1.	"Koi no Aibō Kokoro no Cupid" (恋ノアイボウ心ノクピド)	Toru Yamashita	Takahiro Moriuchi; Yamashita	Moriuchi; Yamashita; Alexander Onizawa; Ryota Kohama; Tomoya Kanki; Akkin	2:53
2.	"Doppelgänger" (どっぺるゲンガー)	Moriuchi	Moriuchi	Moriuchi; Yamashita; Onizawa; Kohama; Kanki; Akkin	3:40
3.	"Kaimu" (皆無 Nothing)	Moriuchi	Moriuchi	Moriuchi; Yamashita; Onizawa; Kohama; Kanki; Satoru Hiraide	3:39
4.	"20 Years Old"	Moriuchi	Moriuchi	Moriuchi; Yamashita; Onizawa; Kohama; Kanki; Jeff Miyahara	3:52
5.	"Living Dolls"	Yamashita	Yamashita	Moriuchi; Yamashita; Onizawa; Kohama; Kanki; Akkin	3:59
6.	"Break My Strings"	Moriuchi	Moriuchi; Onizawa	Moriuchi; Yamashita; Onizawa; Kohama; Kanki; Daisuke Fujimoto; Shinji Omura	4:07
7.	"Sonzai Shōmei" (存在証明 Existential Proof)	Moriuchi	Moriuchi; Yamashita	Moriuchi; Yamashita; Onizawa; Kohama; Kanki; Akkin	3:13
8.	"Convincing"	Moriuchi	Moriuchi	Moriuchi; Yamashita; Onizawa; Kohama; Kanki; Koichi Korenaga	3:41
9.	"My Sweet Baby"	Moriuchi	Moriuchi	Moriuchi; Yamashita; Onizawa; Kohama; Kanki; Miyahara	4:55
10.	"Reflection"	Moriuchi	Moriuchi; Onizawa	Moriuchi; Yamashita; Onizawa; Kohama; Kanki; Fujimoto; Omura	3:37
11.	"Viva Violent Fellow〜Utsukushiki Moshpit〜" (Viva Violent Fellow ～美しきモッシュピット～)	Moriuchi	Moriuchi	Moriuchi; Yamashita; Onizawa; Kohama; Kanki; Korenaga	3:35
12.	"Just" (With "Bossa Nova" hidden track)	Moriuchi	Moriuchi	Moriuchi; Yamashita; Onizawa; Kohama; Kanki; Miyahara	11:14
Total length:					52:25

Kanjō Effect – Limited edition (bonus DVD)
No.	Title	Length
1.	"Hitsuzen Maker (必然メーカー)" (Live Tour 2008 "Beam of Light" Shibuya-AX 08.09.12)
2.	"Melody Line no Shibouritsu (Melody Lineの死亡率)" (Live Tour 2008 "Beam of Light" Shibuya-AX 08.09.12)
3.	"Yoru ni Shika Sakanai Mangetsu (夜にしか咲かない満月)" (Live Tour 2008 "Beam of Light" Shibuya-AX 08.09.12)
4.	"Glass (ガラス)" (Live Tour 2008 "Beam of Light" Shibuya-AX 08.09.12)
5.	"(you can do) everything" (Live Tour 2008 "Beam of Light" Shibuya-AX 08.09.12)
6.	"100% (hundred percent)" (Live Tour 2008 "Beam of Light" Shibuya-AX 08.09.12)
7.	"Crazy Botch" (Live Tour 2008 "Beam of Light" Shibuya-AX 08.09.12)

== Charts ==
=== Weekly charts ===
Weekly chart performance for Kanjō Effect
Chart (2008)	Peak position
Japanese Albums (Oricon)	13
Japanese Albums (Billboard Japan)	13

== Certifications ==
Certifications and sales for Kanjō Effect
Region	Certification	Certified units/sales
Japan (RIAJ)	Gold	100,000^{^}
^{^} Shipments figures based on certification alone.

== Personnel ==
One Ok Rock

- Takahiro "Taka" Moriuchi — lead vocals
- Alexander "Alex" Reimon Onizawa — lead guitar
- Toru Yamashita — rhythm guitar
- Ryota Kohama — bass guitar
- Tomoya Kanki — drums, percussion
