= Niche Syndrome =

- Standard edition cover

Studio album by One Ok Rock
- Released: June 9, 2010
- Studio: Amuse Studio; Alive Studio; Burnish Stone Studios; Sound City Studios; Victor Studios; Sound Crew Studios
- Genre: Alternative rock; pop-punk; post-hardcore; emo
- Length: 48:08
- Language: Japanese; English
- Label: A-Sketch
- Producer: One Ok Rock; Koichi Korenaga; Akkin; Satoru Hiraide

One Ok Rock chronology
Kanjō Effect (2008)	Niche Syndrome (2010)	Zankyo Reference (2011)

Singles from Niche Syndrome
- 1. "Kanzen Kankaku Dreamer" Released: February 3, 2010; 2. "Jibun Rock" Released: April 28, 2010 (rental only at Tsutaya)

Niche Syndrome (Niche シンドローム) is the fourth studio album by Japanese rock band One Ok Rock, released on June 9, 2010. It was released as a normal CD-only edition and a limited CD+DVD edition. This album includes the group's single "Kanzen Kankaku Dreamer", which was released earlier in 2010. This was the first album that did not feature original lead guitarist Alex Onizawa.

The song from the album, "Wherever You Are", peaked at #4 on the Billboard Japan Hot 100 and stayed for 89 weeks. The song was used on NTT Docomo's phone commercial series, "Kazoku-hen". Their single "Kanzen Kankaku Dreamer" peaked at #40 on the Billboard Japan Hot 100 and stayed on the chart for 18 weeks.

The release of Niche Syndrome was followed by a Zepp Tour titled One Ok Rock "This Is My Own Judgement" Tour, spanning from June 27 through July 23, 2010.

== Track listing ==
Niche Syndrome – Standard edition
No.	Title	Lyrics	Music	Arrangement	Length
1.	"Introduction^{[A]}"	-	Takahiro Moriuchi	-	1:00
2.	"Never Let This Go"	Moriuchi	Moriuchi	Moriuchi; Toru Yamashita; Ryota Kohama; Tomoya Kanki; Koichi Korenaga	4:17
3.	"Kanzen Kankaku Dreamer" (完全感覚Dreamer)	Moriuchi	Moriuchi	Moriuchi; Yamashita; Kohama; Kanki; Akkin	4:12
4.	"Konzatsu Communication" (混雑コミュニケーション)	Moriuchi	Moriuchi	Moriuchi; Yamashita; Kohama; Kanki; Akkin	3:19
5.	"Yes I Am"	Yamashita; Moriuchi	Yamashita; Moriuchi	Moriuchi; Yamashita; Kohama; Kanki; Akkin	3:36
6.	"Shake It Down"	Moriuchi	Yamashita; Moriuchi	Moriuchi; Yamashita; Kohama; Kanki; Akkin	3:13
7.	"Jibun Rock" (じぶんRock)	Moriuchi	Moriuchi	Moriuchi; Yamashita; Kohama; Kanki; Akkin	3:47
8.	"Liar"	Moriuchi	Yamashita; Moriuchi	Moriuchi; Yamashita; Kohama; Kanki; Korenaga	3:37
9.	"Wherever You Are^{[B]}"	Moriuchi	Moriuchi	Moriuchi; Yamashita; Kohama; Kanki; Korenaga	4:55
10.	"Riot!!!"	Moriuchi	Moriuchi	Moriuchi; Yamashita; Kohama; Kanki; Korenaga	4:16
11.	"Adult Suit" (アダルトスーツ)	Moriuchi	Yamashita; Moriuchi	Moriuchi; Yamashita; Kohama; Kanki; Akkin	4:11
12.	"Mikansei Kokyokyoku" (未完成交響曲)	Moriuchi	Yamashita; Moriuchi	Moriuchi; Yamashita; Kohama; Kanki; Akkin	3:28
13.	"Nobody's Home^{[C]}"	Moriuchi	Moriuchi	Moriuchi; Yamashita; Kohama; Kanki; Satoru Hiraide	4:17
Total length:					48:08

Niche Syndrome – First press limited edition (bonus track)
No.	Title	Length
13.	"Nobody's Home" (With "Attendance" hidden track)	9:14
Total length:		53:07

Niche Syndrome – Limited edition (bonus DVD)
No.	Title	Director	Length
1.	"Kanzen Kankaku Dreamer" (Music Video)	Hideaki Fukui	4:20
2.	"Jibun Rock" (Music Video)	Hideaki Fukui	3:54
3.	"Liar" (Music Video)	Kensaku Kakimoto	3:49
4.	"Jibun Rock" (Ver.2: MV Shooting Off Shot)		~3:52
5.	"Kanzen Kankaku Dreamer" (2009.11.26 Live at Zepp Tokyo)		~4:40

Notes

- :^{A} "Introduction" is an instrumental song.
- :^{B} "Wherever You Are" was written by Moriuchi for his friend's wedding.
- :^{C} "Nobody's Home" is about Moriuchi's apology and gratitude straightforwardly for his parents Shinichi Mori and Masako Mori.

== Personnel ==
Credits adapted from the liner notes of Niche Syndrome.

One Ok Rock

- Takahiro "Taka" Moriuchi — lead vocals
- Toru Yamashita — guitar, backing vocals
- Ryota Kohama — bass guitar
- Tomoya Kanki — drums

Production

- Hideki Kodera — recording
- Satoru Hiraide — recording, mixing
- Satoshi Hosoi — recording, mixing
- Kensuke Miura — recording
- Ian Cooper — mastering
- Miki Nagashima — assistant engineer
- Naoki Iwata — assistant engineer
- Hideaki Ikawa — assistant engineer
- Norikatsu Teruuchi — assistant engineer
- Masanori Hata — assistant engineer
- Ryota Hattanda — assistant engineer
- Takeshi Baba — assistant engineer
- Kazutaka Minemori — instrument technician
- Yoshiro "Masuo" Arimatsu — instrument technician
- Yukifumi Kaneko — instrument technician
- Kyohei Meguro — instrument technician

Design

- Kazuaki Seki — art direction
- Daichi Shiono — design

== Charts ==
=== Weekly charts ===
Weekly chart performance for Niche Syndrome
Chart (2010)	Peak position
Japanese Albums (Oricon)	4
Japanese Albums (Billboard Japan)	3

=== Year-end charts ===
2016, year-end chart performance for Niche Syndrome
Chart (2016)	Position
Japanese Albums (Oricon)	59
Japanese Hot Albums (Billboard)	28

2025 year-end chart performance for Niche Syndrome
Chart (2025)	Position
Japanese Hot Albums (Billboard Japan)	49

=== Singles ===
Title	Year	Peak positions	
Title	Year	JPN Oricon	JPN Billboard
"Kanzen Kankaku Dreamer" (完全感覚Dreamer)	2010	9	40

=== Other charted songs ===
Title	Year	Peak positions
Title	Year	JPN Billboard
"Wherever You Are"	2010	4

== Certifications ==
Certifications and sales for Niche Syndrome
Region	Certification	Certified units/sales
Japan (RIAJ)	Platinum	250,000^{^}
^{^} Shipments figures based on certification alone.
