= 35xxxv =

2015 studio album by One Ok Rock

Studio album by One Ok Rock
- Released: February 11, 2015
- Studios: 17 Hertz Studio; Foxy Studios; Alchemy Studios; WeVolve Music; The Ranch; Box Canyon; Castle View Studios
- Genres: Alternative rock; pop-punk; post-hardcore; emo; power pop
- Length: 45:57
- Languages: English; Japanese
- Label: A-Sketch
- Producers: John Feldmann; Colin Brittain; Arnold Lanni; Jordan Schmidt; Akkin; Jude Cole; One Ok Rock

One Ok Rock chronology
Jinsei×Boku= (2013)	35xxxv (2015)	35xxxv (deluxe edition) (2015)

Singles from 35xxxv
- 1. "Mighty Long Fall/Decision" Released: July 30, 2014; 2. "Cry Out" Released: February 11, 2015

Professional ratings
Review scores
Source	Rating
Metal.de	6/10
Alternative Press Japan	4.5/5 stars
IZM	3.5/5 stars

35xxxv (read as thirty five or Sātīfaibu) is the seventh studio album by the Japanese band One OK Rock. It was released on February 11, 2015. This is their first album recorded abroad, primarily in the US. The song "Mighty Long Fall" was the theme song of the 2014 sequel film Rurouni Kenshin: Kyoto Inferno, while "Heartache" was used for the third film, Rurouni Kenshin: The Legend Ends. "Mighty Long Fall" peaked at #2 on the Billboard Japan Hot 100 and stayed for 17 weeks.

The limited version of pre-order album bundled with a DVD of the acoustic performance of the band for the songs "Mighty Long Fall" and "Decision" sold out immediately before the end of 2014.

On February 28, 2015, the album peaked at #11 on Billboard Heatseekers Albums. This chart is for new and upcoming musicians, which is usually a stepping stone towards Billboard 200 or Billboard Hot 100. On the same week, it peaked at #43 on Billboard Independent Albums. Then it peaked at #23 on the Billboard Hard Rock Albums Chart and reached #1 on the Billboard World Albums Chart.

An international, English language version of the album was released in the United States by Warner Bros. Records on September 25, 2015 with two exclusive bonus tracks.

== Background and development ==
The band started recording the album in January 2014 in Los Angeles, US. They did it during their premiere tour in Los Angeles and New York. They worked with John Feldmann and Chris Lord-Alge. On January 12, 2014 their album producer John Feldmann tweeted that One Ok Rock had already started recording their new album. The album's title, "35xxxv", came from number "35" which was considered as the band's lucky number as they kept seeing the number during their recording process in the United States.

Their first single from the forthcoming album, "Mighty Long Fall", is the theme song for the movie sequel of Rurouni Kenshin. One Ok Rock released new single "Mighty Long Fall/Decision" on July 30, 2014. The song "Decision" is the theme song for their documentary film "Fool cool rock". A music video for "Decision" released on August 20, 2014 contains a compilation footage from their last tour in Europe and Asia. They also revealed the theme song for another movie sequel of Rurouni Kenshin entitled "Heartache".

In September 2014, One Ok Rock held a 2-day stadium concert in Yokohama Stadium in front of 60,000 people called "Mighty Long Fall Live at Yokohama Stadium 2014". This was their first time performing in a stadium. Their act was broadcast live on WOWOW. They played more than twenty songs, including three new songs and a cover of "A Thousand Miles" by Vanessa Carlton.

== Promotion ==
One Ok Rock released the music video of "Mighty Long Fall" on June 22, 2014. On August 19, 2014 they released a compilation of footage from Who are you?? Who are we?? tour and mixed with the song "Decision". Despite being featured in the movie Rurouni Kenshin: The Legend Ends that was released in September 2014, the song "Heartache" wasn't officially released until the album release. On January 14, 2015, the album could be pre-ordered on iTunes, with the song "Cry Out". On January 20, 2015, they released the music video of "Cry Out".

== Track listing ==
35xxxv – Standard edition
No.	Title	Writer(s)	Producer(s)	Length
1.	"3xxxv5"	Takahiro Moriuchi	Colin Brittain^{[a]}	1:41
2.	"Take Me to the Top"	Moriuchi; Colin Brittain	Brittain	3:15
3.	"Cry Out"	Moriuchi; Brittain	Brittain	3:48
4.	"Suddenly"	Toru Yamashita; Moriuchi	Akkin; Brittain^{[a]}; Zakk Cervini^{[a]}	3:03
5.	"Mighty Long Fall"	Moriuchi; Yamashita; Tomoya Kanki; Ryota Kohama; John Feldmann	Feldmann	4:03
6.	"Heartache"	Moriuchi; Arnold Lanni	Lanni	4:24
7.	"Memories"	Moriuchi; Jordan Schmidt	Schmidt	3:21
8.	"Decision"	Moriuchi; Feldmann	Feldmann	3:44
9.	"Paper Planes" (featuring Kellin Quinn of Sleeping with Sirens)	Moriuchi; Feldmann; Nicholas "RAS" Furlong; Kellin Quinn	Feldmann	3:20
10.	"Good Goodbye"	Moriuchi; Brittain	Brittain	3:44
11.	"One by One"	Moriuchi; Feldmann	Feldmann	3:39
12.	"Stuck in the Middle"	Moriuchi; Yamashita; Kanki; Kohama; Feldmann	Feldmann	3:32
13.	"Fight the Night"	Moriuchi; Jude Cole	Cole	4:17
Total length:				45:57

35xxxv – First press limited edition (bonus track)
No.	Title	Length
13.	"Fight the Night^{[b]}" (With "Gerogeropā" hidden track)	13:20
Total length:		54:53

35xxxv – Limited edition (bonus DVD)
No.	Title	Length
1.	"Mighty Long Fall" (Studio Jam Session Vol.2)
2.	"Decision" (Studio Jam Session Vol.2)
Total length:		11:54

=== Notes ===
- ^{^[a]} denotes an additional producer
- ^{^[b]} "Fight the Night" ends at 4:16; followed by 6:09 of silence, followed by hidden track "Gerogeropā"

== Charts ==
=== Weekly charts ===
Weekly chart performance for 35xxxv
Chart (2015)	Peak position
Japanese Albums (Oricon)	1
Japanese Albums (Billboard Japan)	1
US Hard Rock Albums (Billboard)	23
US Heatseekers Albums (Billboard)	11
US Independent Albums (Billboard)	43
US World Albums (Billboard)	1

=== Year-end charts ===
Yearly chart performance for 35xxxv
Chart (2015)	Position
Japanese Albums (Oricon)	17
Japanese Hot Albums (Billboard)	34

=== Singles ===
Title	Year	Peak positions	
Title	Year	JPN Oricon	JPN Billboard
"Mighty Long Fall"	2014	2	2
"Decision"	2014	2	12
"Cry Out"	2015	—	15

=== Other charted songs ===
Title	Year	Peak positions
Title	Year	JPN Billboard
"Heartache"	2015	43

== Certifications ==
Certifications and sales for 35xxxv
Region	Certification	Certified units/sales
Japan (RIAJ)	Platinum	250,000^{^}
^{^} Shipments figures based on certification alone.

== 35xxxv (deluxe edition) ==
35xxxv (deluxe edition)

Studio album by One Ok Rock
- Released: September 25, 2015
- Studios: 17 Hertz Studio; Foxy Studios; Alchemy Studios; WeVolve Music; The Ranch; Box Canyon; Castle View Studios
- Genres: Alternative rock; pop-punk; post-hardcore; emo; power pop
- Length: 52:38
- Language: English
- Labels: Warner Bros.; Amuse, Inc.
- Producers: John Feldmann; Colin Brittain; Arnold Lanni; Jordan Schmidt; Akkin; Jude Cole; One Ok Rock

One Ok Rock chronology
35xxxv (2015)	35xxxv (deluxe edition) (2015)	Ambitions (2017)

Singles from 35xxxv (deluxe edition)
- 1. "Last Dance" Released: September 25, 2015; 2. "The Way Back" Released: October 2, 2015

In July 2015, One Ok Rock officially announced that they signed with Warner Bros. Records and planned to re-release 35xxxv as a deluxe edition containing all English tracks on September 25, 2015. This edition contains a black album art cover and includes two new tracks, "Last Dance" and "The Way Back". In order to promote their U.S. debut, the band had a North American tour in fall 2015 with a few selected cities as headlining artists, but also opened for All Time Low and Sleeping with Sirens for several cities in the U.S. One Ok Rock also had world tour in Europe and Asia.

On the week of October 17, 2015, 35xxxv (Deluxe Edition) debuted at #20 on Billboard Heatseekers Albums and its highest peak position is at #17.

=== Track listing ===
No.	Title	Writer(s)	Producer(s)	Length
1.	"3xxxv5"	Moriuchi	Brittain^{[a]}	1:41
2.	"Take Me to the Top"	Moriuchi; Brittain	Brittain	3:15
3.	"Cry Out"	Moriuchi; Brittain	Brittain	3:48
4.	"Suddenly"	Yamashita; Moriuchi	Akkin; Brittain^{[a]}; Cervini^{[a]}	3:03
5.	"Mighty Long Fall"	Moriuchi; Yamashita; Kanki; Kohama; Feldmann	Feldmann	4:03
6.	"Heartache"	Moriuchi; Lanni	Lanni	4:24
7.	"Memories"	Moriuchi; Schmidt	Schmidt	3:21
8.	"Decision" (featuring Tyler Carter of Issues)	Moriuchi; Feldmann	Feldmann	3:44
9.	"Paper Planes" (featuring Kellin Quinn of Sleeping with Sirens)	Moriuchi; Feldmann; Furlong; Quinn	Feldmann	3:20
10.	"Good Goodbye"	Moriuchi; Brittain	Brittain	3:44
11.	"One by One"	Moriuchi; Feldmann	Feldmann	3:39
12.	"Stuck in the Middle"	Moriuchi; Yamashita; Kanki; Kohama; Feldmann	Feldmann	3:32
13.	"Fight the Night"	Moriuchi; Cole	Cole	4:16
14.	"Last Dance"	Moriuchi; Cole	Cole	3:49
15.	"The Way Back"	Moriuchi; Feldmann	Feldmann; Brittain^{[a]}; Cervini^{[a]}	3:02
Total length:				52:38

==== Notes ====
- ^{^[a]} denotes an additional producer

=== Charts ===
Weekly chart performance for 35xxxv (deluxe edition)
Chart (2015)	Peak position
US Heatseekers Albums (Billboard)	17

==== Singles ====
Title	Year	Peak positions	
Title	Year	JPN Oricon	JPN Billboard
"Last Dance"	2015	—	93
"The Way Back"	2015	—	6

== Personnel ==
Credits adapted from the liner notes of 35xxxv (deluxe edition).

One Ok Rock

- Takahiro "Taka" Moriuchi — lead vocals
- Toru Yamashita — guitar
- Ryota Kohama — bass guitar
- Tomoya Kanki — drums

General team

- Amuse Group USA, Inc. — publishing
- Jamil Kazmi — direction, coordination, narration (4)
- Kazunori Ito — direction, coordination

Production

- Naoki Itai — recording, programming (1)
- Justin Smith — mastering (1–15)
- Colin Brittain — mixing, additional production (1), production, engineering (2, 3), additional production (4), engineering, additional programming (5, 8), engineering, editing, programming (9, 12), production, engineering, mixing (10), additional production, engineering, editing, programming (15)
- Kato Khandwala — mixing (2, 3)
- Jordan Schmidt — engineering (2, 3), production, engineering (7), engineering (10)
- David Davis — engineering (2, 3, 10)
- Jonny Litten — programming (2, 3, 10)
- Sean Madhill — assistant engineering (2, 3, 10)
- Sonny Brooks — assistant engineering (2, 3, 10)
- Akkin — production (4)
- John Feldmann — mixing (4), production (5, 8), production, recording, mixing (9), production, recording, mixing (11), production, recording (12), production, recording, mixing (15)
- Zakk Cervini — mixing, additional production (4), engineering, additional programming (5, 8), mixing, engineering, editing, programming (9), engineering, editing, programming (11, 12), additional production, engineering, editing, programming, mixing (15)
- Tommy English — engineering (4), engineering, editing, programming (11, 12)
- Vic Wainstein — assistant engineering (4, 7)
- Chris Lord-Alge — mixing (5, 6, 8, 13, 14)
- Tom Lord-Alge — mixing (7, 12)
- Arnold Lanni — production, engineering (6), sound designer, string arrangement (6)
- Greg Johnson — assistant engineering, sound designer, string arrangement (6)
- Todd McKernan — assistant engineering (6)
- Matt Pauling — engineering, editing, programming (9), additional engineering (15)
- Allie Snow — intern (9, 11, 12)
- Terence Healy — intern (9, 11, 12)
- Jude Cole — production, piano, synthesizer (13), production, piano, synthesizer, additional vocals (14)
- Florian Ammon — recording (13, 14)
- Devon Corey — additional editing (15)

Additional musicians

- Fall of Ai Chamber Orchestra — strings (6)

Design

- Kazuaki Seki — art direction
- Daichi Shiono — design
- Alex Tenta — package layout

== Release history ==
Release dates and formats for 35xxxv
Region	Date	Format(s)	Edition(s)	Label(s)	Ref.
Japan	February 11, 2015	Digital download; streaming; CD	Standard	A-Sketch	
Japan	February 11, 2015	CD+DVD	Limited	A-Sketch	
Various	September 25, 2015	CD	Deluxe	Warner Bros. Records; Amuse, Inc.	

== See also ==
- List of Oricon number-one albums of 2015
