= Beam of Light =

Studio album by One Ok Rock
- Released: May 28, 2008
- Genre: Alternative rock; pop-punk; post-grunge
- Length: 26:12
- Language: Japanese; English
- Label: Aer-born
- Producer: One Ok Rock; Akkin; Koichi Korenaga; Hideki Tanaka

One Ok Rock chronology
Zeitakubyō (2007)	Beam of Light (2008)	Kanjō Effect (2008)

Beam of Light is the second full-length album by the Japanese rock band One Ok Rock, released on May 28, 2008. It reached No. 17 on the Oricon weekly chart, and charted for six weeks before it dropped out.

Professional ratings
Review scores
Source	Rating
AllMusic	4/5 stars

== Track listing ==
Beam of Light – CD
No.	Title	Lyrics	Music	Arrangement	Length
1.	"Hitsuzen Maker" (必然メーカー)	Takahiro Moriuchi	Moriuchi; Toru Yamashita	Moriuchi; Yamashita; Alexander Onizawa; Ryota Kohama; Tomoya Kanki; Akkin	3:30
2.	"Melody Line no Shibouritsu" (Melody Lineの死亡率 Mortality Rate of Melody Line)	Yamashita	Moriuchi; Yamashita	Moriuchi; Yamashita; Onizawa; Kohama; Kanki; Akkin	3:44
3.	"100% (One Hundred Percent)"	Moriuchi	Moriuchi; Yamashita	Moriuchi; Yamashita; Onizawa; Kohama; Kanki; Akkin	3:06
4.	"Abduction-Interlude"	-	Onizawa	Koichi Korenaga	1:45
5.	"Sansan Dama"	Moriuchi	Moriuchi	Moriuchi; Yamashita; Onizawa; Kohama; Kanki; Korenaga	3:58
6.	"Koubou" (光芒 Light Beam)	Moriuchi	Moriuchi	Moriuchi; Yamashita; Onizawa; Kohama; Kanki; Korenaga	3:28
7.	"Crazy Botch"	Moriuchi	Moriuchi; Yamashita; Onizawa	Moriuchi; Yamashita; Onizawa; Kohama; Kanki; Korenaga; Hideki Tanaka	3:54
8.	"Yap"	Moriuchi	Moriuchi	Moriuchi; Yamashita; Onizawa; Kohama; Kanki; Akkin	2:46
Total length:					26:12

Notes

- "Abduction-Interlude" is an instrumental song.

== Charts ==
=== Weekly charts ===
Weekly chart performance for Beam of Light
Chart (2008)	Peak position
Japanese Albums (Oricon)	17
Japanese Albums (Billboard Japan)	14

== Personnel ==
One Ok Rock

- Takahiro "Taka" Moriuchi — lead vocals
- Alexander "Alex" Reimon Onizawa — lead guitar
- Toru Yamashita — rhythm guitar
- Ryota Kohama — bass guitar
- Tomoya Kanki — drums, percussion
