= Delusion:All =

Single by One Ok Rock

from the album Detox
- Language: English
- Released: July 12, 2024
- Genre: Hard rock
- Length: 3:04
- Label: Fueled by Ramen
- Songwriters: Takahiro Moriuchi; Dan Lancaster; Jason Alon; Tyler Carter
- Producers: Dan Lancaster; Rob Cavallo

One Ok Rock singles chronology
"Make It Out Alive" (2023)	"Delusion:All" (2024)	"Dystopia" (2024)

Music video
- "Delusion:All" on YouTube

"Delusion:All" is a song by Japanese rock band One Ok Rock from their eleventh studio album, Detox. It was released as the album's lead single by Fueled by Ramen on July 12, 2024. Written by Takahiro Moriuchi, Jason Aalon Butler, Dan Lancaster and Tyler Carter, and produced by Lancaster and Rob Cavallo, the song serves as the theme for Japanese historical war film Kingdom 4: Return of the Great General (2024).

== Background and release ==
On June 11, 2024, the Japanese historical war film Kingdom 4: Return of the Great General announced that One Ok Rock would be performed the film's theme song titled "Delusion:All". It is the second song by the band to feature on the film adaption of manga series Kingdom franchise since the 2019 first film with "Wasted Nights". The song was released concurrently alongside the film on July 12, 2024.

== Composition ==
"Delusion:All" is described as a heavy rock track with theme of "disillusionment and skepticism towards societal and political systems." According to the band's lead vocalist Takahiro Moriuchi at the press release, the song depicts "the various conflicts in the world and the current historical background [of the film]."

== Music video ==
An accompanying music video for "Delusion:All" premiered on July 12, 2024, at 22:00 JST on the band's YouTube channel. Directed by Taichi Kimura, the visual expresses the civil unrest and the indifference of the affluent.

== Credits and personnel ==
- One Ok Rock
  - Taka – vocals, songwriter
  - Toru – guitar
  - Ryota – bass
  - Tomoya – drums
- Dan Lancaster – background vocals, songwriter, producer, guitar, programming
- Tyler Carter – songwriter, recording
- Jason Alon – songwriter
- Rob Cavallo – producer
- MEG – recording
- Zakk Cervini – mixing
  - Julian Gargiulo – assistant
- Vlado Meller – mastering

== Charts ==
Chart performance for "Delusion:All"
Chart (2024)	Peak position
Global Excl. US (Billboard)	92
Japan (Japan Hot 100)	7
Japan Combined Singles (Oricon)	14

== Certifications ==
Certifications for "Delusion:All"
Region	Certification	Certified units/sales
Streaming
Japan (RIAJ)	Gold	50,000,000^{†}
^{†} Streaming-only figures based on certification alone.
