= Ambitions (album) =

- Japanese album cover

Studio album by One Ok Rock
- Released: January 11, 2017
- Studio: Foxy Studios, Los Angeles; The Hideout Studios, Las Vegas
- Genre: Pop rock; alternative rock; post-hardcore; emo pop
- Length: 49:30 (Japanese edition); 49:17 (international edition)
- Language: English
- Label: A-Sketch; Fueled by Ramen
- Producer: Colin Brittain; John Feldmann; Dan Lancaster; Andrew Goldstein; Kane Churko; CJ Baran; One Ok Rock

One Ok Rock chronology
35xxxv (2015)	Ambitions (2017)	Eye of the Storm (2019)

Singles from Ambitions
- 1. "Always Coming Back" Released: March 11, 2016 (Japan); 2. "Taking Off" Released: September 16, 2016; 3. "Bedroom Warfare" Released: November 18, 2016; 4. "I Was King" Released: December 15, 2016; 5. "We Are" Released: January 9, 2017; 6. "American Girls" Released: February 3, 2017 (US)

International edition

Professional ratings
Review scores
Source	Rating
Alternative Press	3.5/5 stars
Melodic	3/5 stars
Rock Sound	4/5 stars

Ambitions is the eighth studio album by Japanese rock band One Ok Rock. The Japanese version was released on January 11, 2017 under the Japanese label A-Sketch, while the international version dropped on January 13, 2017 under the American label Fueled by Ramen.

The song "Always Coming Back" was featured in NTT Docomo's phone commercial series, "Kanjou no Subete / Nakama". After signing with Fueled by Ramen on September 11, 2016, they released the lead single "Taking Off" on September 16, 2016 that was used as a theme song for the Japanese movie "Museum", which starred Shun Oguri, and the second single "Bedroom Warfare" on November 18, 2016. The song "I Was King" was released on December 15, 2016. On January 9, 2017, they released their single "We Are".

Sold in both Limited and Regular editions, the album was available for pre-order on iTunes starting November 18, 2016. The Japanese limited edition album features bonus tracks and a DVD of studio acoustic sessions, while the Ambitions international version CD came with a T-shirt bundle.

== Background ==
In an interview with UK rock magazine Kerrang! issue number 1649 dated December 10, 2016, One Ok Rock vocalist Moriuchi explained the three themes on this album: Hope, ambition, and singing together. He said that the band were at a point in their career where they were trying to break a new market and go worldwide. It was the ambition that was inside of them that pushed them to try new things and to be successful, which became a prevailing theme on the record. The album artwork is yellow, which is the colour of hope. The overall themes of the album are: "Ambition", the title, yellow is the hope, and the songs are anthemic in quality especially in the choruses. In another interview, Moriuchi said, "We wanted to make an album where we can all sing along together. By singing strongly in unison about hope, we wish to reinforce the importance of not giving up."

== Themes ==
Most of the album themes are more personal topics compared to their previous album 35xxxv. It focuses mostly about achieving dreams, life, family, and struggles of depression. Their second track, "Bombs Away" tells about fighting the inner demons or "you versus yourself". "We Are" and "Jaded", are encouraging tracks for the people who lost their hopes and symbolizes empowerment for achieving their goals. "Hard To Love" and "Always Coming Back" are more personal tracks in Ambitions, Moriuchi wrote those songs dedicated to his father. "I Was King" tells the band's ambition to reach some bigger dreams. In Japanese edition, "20/20" is a breakup song, and tells about lovers being cheated by their own beloved ones. "Listen" is about people's struggles with suicide and depression, the band wanted to wake them up and not giving up their life. "Lost in Tonight" is merely a party song. Meanwhile, their first single "Taking Off" tells about "passions for doing what you love". "Start Again" and their last track along 5 Seconds of Summer, "Take What You Want" are the band's notes and commitment to leaving their past and being ready to overcome what's ahead on their future.

== Promotion ==
Fueled by Ramen released One Ok Rock's music videos of "Taking Off" on October 25, 2016 and "Bedroom Warfare" on November 17, 2016 which were both directed by Sitcom Soldiers. Then on December 16, 2016, they released the band's visualizer video of "I Was King" which was directed and animated by Ruth Barrett along with two assistant animators Eva Wagner and Sam Thompson.

On November 13, 2016, One Ok Rock released a compilation of footage from One Ok Rock 2016 Special Live in Nagisaen and mixed with the song "Taking Off" then on November 30, 2016, they released a Studio Jam Session video of "Taking Off" which were both directed by Naoto Amazutsumi.

On January 1, 2017, One Ok Rock opened a special site called "World Ambitions". This is a celebration of the album "Ambitions" which will be released on January 11, 2017. "World Ambitions" is a website that visually represents images of "hope" being shared and spread from users around the world through the website and Twitter/Instagram. People from all over the world can upload pictures with yellow in it that symbolize hope and connecting them all. The user shares the desired image by SNS (Twitter, Instagram). It is also possible to upload simultaneously with multiple names.

On January 9, 2017, the band released the music video of "We Are" (Japanese version) while Fueled by Ramen released their music video of the international version of "We Are". Both videos were directed by Mark Staubach.

In January 2017, the band went on their North American tour for 6 concerts, and from February till May 2017, they held 32 concerts in some Japanese arenas.

== Commercial performance ==
In Japan, Ambitions debuted at number one on the Daily Oricon Albums Chart, selling 102,408 units. For its first week on the Weekly Oricon Albums Chart, it entered atop the chart with over 232,710 copies sold; It sold more copies than its competitor of the week, SMAP's greatest hits album Smap 25 Years (2016). Ambitions became the band's second number one album, and also resulted in becoming their highest first week sales for one of their albums.

One OK Rock had the world's best-selling album with Ambitions during the week of January 25, 2017. It topped the Global Album Chart with 315,000 equivalent sales (including paid downloads and streaming).

== Track listing ==
Ambitions – Japanese standard edition
No.	Title	Writer(s)	Producer(s)	Length
1.	"Ambitions" (Introduction^{[a]})	-	Colin Brittain	1:23
2.	"Bombs Away"	Takahiro Moriuchi; Brittain; Bruno Agra	Brittain; Jonathan Gerring^{[b]}	4:23
3.	"Taking Off"	Moriuchi; Dan Lancaster; Nick Long	Lancaster	3:39
4.	"We Are"	Toru Yamashita; Moriuchi; Brittain; Long	Brittain; Gerring^{[b]}	4:15
5.	"20/20"	Moriuchi; Brittain; Long	Brittain	3:19
6.	"Always Coming Back"	Moriuchi; Yamashita; John Feldmann	Feldmann; Zakk Cervini^{[b]}; Matt Pauling^{[b]}; Brittain^{[b]}	3:33
7.	"Bedroom Warfare"	Moriuchi; Nolan Sipe; Andrew Goldstein	Goldstein	3:23
8.	"Lost in Tonight"	Moriuchi; Kane Churko	Churko	2:52
9.	"I Was King"	Moriuchi; Feldmann; Simon Wilcox; Brittain	Feldmann; Cervini^{[b]}; Pauling^{[b]}; Brittain^{[b]}	3:58
10.	"Listen" (featuring Avril Lavigne)	Moriuchi; Brittain; Long	Brittain; Gerring^{[b]}	3:39
11.	"One Way Ticket"	Moriuchi; CJ Baran; Long	Baran; Mike Shinoda^{[b]}	3:37
12.	"Bon Voyage"	Yamashita; Moriuchi; Brittain	Brittain; Gerring^{[b]}	4:06
13.	"Start Again"	Moriuchi; Brittain; Long	Brittain	3:14
14.	"Take What You Want" (featuring 5 Seconds of Summer)	Moriuchi; Brittain; Long	Brittain	4:04
Total length:				49:30

Ambitions – Japanese limited edition (hidden track)
No.	Title	Length
15.	Untitled	2:20
Total length:		53:54

Ambitions – Japanese limited edition (bonus DVD)
No.	Title	Length
1.	"We Are" (Studio Jam Session Vol.3)
2.	"Bombs Away" (Studio Jam Session Vol.3)
Total length:		9:17

Ambitions – International edition
No.	Title	Writer(s)	Producer(s)	Length
1.	"Ambitions" (Introduction^{[a]})	-	Brittain	1:23
2.	"Bombs Away"	Moriuchi; Brittain; Agra	Brittain; Gerring^{[b]}	4:24
3.	"Taking Off"	Moriuchi; Lancaster; Long	Lancaster	3:38
4.	"We Are"	Yamashita; Moriuchi; Brittain; Long	Brittain; Gerring^{[b]}	4:15
5.	"Jaded" (featuring Alex Gaskarth of All Time Low)	Moriuchi; Brittain; Long	Brittain	3:36
6.	"Hard to Love"	Moriuchi; Brittain; Long	Brittain	3:16
7.	"Bedroom Warfare"	Moriuchi; Sipe; Goldstein	Goldstein	3:22
8.	"American Girls"	Moriuchi; Scott Stevens; Wilcox	Stevens	2:48
9.	"I Was King"	Moriuchi; Feldmann; Wilcox; Brittain	Feldmann; Cervini^{[b]}; Pauling^{[b]}; Brittain^{[b]}	3:58
10.	"Listen"	Moriuchi; Brittain; Long	Brittain; Gerring^{[b]}	3:39
11.	"One Way Ticket"	Moriuchi; Baran; Long	Baran; Shinoda^{[b]}	3:36
12.	"Bon Voyage"	Yamashita; Moriuchi; Brittain	Brittain; Gerring^{[b]}	4:05
13.	"Start Again"	Moriuchi; Brittain; Long	Brittain	3:14
14.	"Take What You Want" (featuring 5 Seconds of Summer)	Moriuchi; Brittain; Long	Brittain	4:03
Total length:				49:17

=== Notes ===
- ^{^[a]} "Ambitions" (Introduction) is an instrumental song composed by Takahiro Moriuchi, Toru Yamashita, Tomoya Kanki, Ryota Kohama and Colin Brittain
- ^{^[b]} denotes an additional producer

== Personnel ==
Credits adapted from the liner notes of Ambitions (Japanese edition).

One Ok Rock

- Takahiro "Taka" Moriuchi – lead vocals
- Toru Yamashita – guitar
- Ryota Kohama – bass guitar
- Tomoya Kanki – drums

Production

- Colin Brittain – production, mixing (1), production, engineering, programming (2, 4, 5, 10, 13, 14), engineering, editing, programming, additional production (6, 9), production, recording, programming (12)
- Dan Lancaster – mixing (2, 5, 9, 10, 12, 13, 14), production, engineering, mixing (3)
- Jonathan Gerring – additional programming, additional production (2, 12), programming, additional production (4, 10)
- Neil Avron – mixing (4)
- Ben Sabin – additional engineering, digital editing, piano (4)
- Nick Long – additional instruments, backing vocals (4, 10, 13)
- Zakk Cervini – mixing (6), engineering, editing, programming, additional production (6, 9)
- John Feldmann – production, recording (6, 9)
- Matt Pauling – engineering, editing, programming, additional production (6, 9)
- Şerban Ghenea – mixing (7)
- Andrew Goldstein – production (7)
- John Hanes – engineering for mixing (7)
- Kane Churko – production, engineering, mixing, mastering (8)
- CJ Baran – production (11)
- Mike Shinoda – additional production (11)
- Mitch McCarthy – mixing (11)
- Florian Ammon – additional vocal recording, engineering (10, 12)
- Ted Jensen – mastering (1–7, 9–14)
- Bruno Agra – drum tech

Additional personnel

- Nolan Sipe – additional vocals (7)
- Aimer – backing vocals (10)
- Tyler Carter – vocal direction (12)
- Chris Baseford – Avril Lavigne's vocal production (10)
- Phil Threlfall – 5 Seconds of Summer vocal recording (14)

Design

- Kazuaki Seki – art direction
- Daichi Shiono – design

== Charts ==
=== Weekly charts ===
Weekly chart performance for Ambitions
Chart (2017)	Peak position
Australian Albums (ARIA)	57
Austrian Albums (Ö3 Austria)	72
Belgian Albums (Ultratop Flanders)	195
Canadian Albums (Billboard)	61
German Albums (Offizielle Top 100)	99
Japan Hot Albums (Billboard Japan)	1
Japanese Weekly Albums Chart (Oricon)	1
New Zealand Heatseeker Albums (RMNZ)	2
South Korean Albums (Gaon)	76
UK Digital Albums (OCC)	62
UK Rock & Metal Albums (OCC)	7
US Billboard 200	106
US Top Alternative Albums (Billboard)	9
US Top Rock Albums (Billboard)	12
US Top Hard Rock Albums (Billboard)	2

=== Year-end charts ===
Yearly chart performance for Ambitions
Chart (2017)	Position
Japanese Albums (Oricon)	11
Japanese Hot Albums (Billboard)	5

Chart (2018)	Position
Japanese Hot Albums (Billboard)	59

=== Singles ===
Title	Year	Peak positions
Title	Year	JPN Billboard
"Always Coming Back"	2016	9
"Taking Off"	2016	4
"Bedroom Warfare"	2016	20
"I Was King"	2016	26
"We Are"	2017	4

=== Other charted songs ===
Title	Year	Peak positions		
Title	Year	JPN Billboard	US Hot Rock	US Spotify Viral 50
"Listen" (featuring Avril Lavigne)	2017	93	—	—
"Take What You Want" (featuring 5 Seconds of Summer)	2017	57	44	13

== Certifications ==
Certifications and sales for Ambitions
Region	Certification	Certified units/sales
Japan (RIAJ)	Platinum	250,000^{^}
^{^} Shipments figures based on certification alone.

== Accolades ==
Awards and nominations for Ambitions
Award ceremony	Year	Category	Result	Ref.
Japan Gold Disc Award	2018	Best 5 Albums	Won	

=== Year-end lists ===
Alternative Press listed the song "Jaded" (with Alex Gaskarth) in their ranking of 12 Best Vocal Collabs of 2017.

== Release history ==
Release dates and formats for Ambitions
Region	Date	Format(s)	Edition(s)	Label(s)	Ref.
Various	January 11, 2017	Digital download; streaming	Standard	Fueled by Ramen; Warner	
Japan	January 11, 2017	Digital download; streaming; CD	Standard	A-Sketch	
Japan	January 11, 2017	CD+DVD	Limited	A-Sketch	
Various	January 13, 2017	CD	Standard	Fueled by Ramen; Warner	
Taiwan	January 13, 2017	CD	Standard	Warner Music Taiwan	

== See also ==
- List of Oricon number-one albums of 2017
