= Zankyo Reference =

- Standard edition cover

Studio album by One Ok Rock
- Released: October 5, 2011
- Studio: Alive Studio; Avaco Creative Studio; Prime Sound Studio; Victor Studios; Amuse Studio; Promix Heacon Studio
- Genre: Alternative rock; pop-punk; post-hardcore; emo
- Length: 39:41
- Language: Japanese; English
- Label: A-Sketch
- Producer: One Ok Rock; Akkin; Koichi Korenaga; Daisuke Fujimoto

One Ok Rock chronology
Niche Syndrome (2010)	Zankyo Reference (2011)	Jinsei×Boku= (2013)

Singles from Zankyo Reference
- 1. "Answer is Near" Released: February 16, 2011; 2. "Re:make/No Scared" Released: July 20, 2011

Zankyo Reference (残響リファレンス, Zankyō Rifarensu; lit. Echo Reference) is the fifth studio album by the Japanese rock band One Ok Rock. It was released on October 5, 2011.

Their single "Re:make" was used in Recochoku Co, Ltd. commercial, while "No Scared" was used in the Black Rock Shooter: The Game PSP video game. The song "Lost and Found" was used for the theme song of Milocrorze: A Love Story movie. A concert film of the band's performance in Yokohama Arena was released in 2012, titled "Zankyo Reference" TOUR in YOKOHAMA ARENA.

== Track listing ==
Zankyo Reference – Standard edition
No.	Title	Lyrics	Music	Arrangement	Length
1.	"Coda^{[A]}"	–	Toru Yamashita	Yamashita; Akkin	0:50
2.	"Lost and Found"	Takahiro Moriuchi	Yamashita; Moriuchi	Moriuchi; Yamashita; Ryota Kohama; Tomoya Kanki; Akkin	3:03
3.	"Answer is Near" (アンサイズニア)	Moriuchi	Yamashita; Moriuchi	Moriuchi; Yamashita; Kohama; Kanki; Akkin	3:40
4.	"No Scared"	Moriuchi	Yamashita; Moriuchi	Moriuchi; Yamashita; Kohama; Kanki; Akkin	3:39
5.	"C.h.a.o.s.m.y.t.h.^{[B]}"	Moriuchi	Moriuchi; Yamashita; Kohama; Kanki	Moriuchi; Yamashita; Kohama; Kanki; Akkin	5:18
6.	"Mr. Gendai Speaker" (Mr.現代Speaker)	Moriuchi	Yamashita; Moriuchi	Moriuchi; Yamashita; Kohama; Kanki; Akkin	3:54
7.	"Seken Shirazu no Uchū Hikōshi" (世間知らずの宇宙飛行士)	Kanki; Kohama	Kanki; Kohama	Moriuchi; Yamashita; Kohama; Kanki; Akkin	3:32
8.	"Re:make"	Moriuchi	Moriuchi	Moriuchi; Yamashita; Kohama; Kanki; Koichi Korenaga	3:25
9.	"Pierce"	Moriuchi	Moriuchi	Moriuchi; Yamashita; Kohama; Kanki; Akkin	4:25
10.	"Let's Take It Someday"	Moriuchi	Moriuchi	Moriuchi; Yamashita; Kohama; Kanki; Akkin	3:41
11.	"Kimishidai Ressha" (キミシダイ列車)	Moriuchi	Moriuchi; Yamashita; Kohama; Kanki	Moriuchi; Yamashita; Kohama; Kanki; Daisuke Fujimoto; Akkin	4:14
Total length:					39:41

Zankyo Reference – First press limited edition (bonus track)
No.	Title	Length
11.	"Kimishidai Ressha" (キミシダイ列車) (With "Tateyama" hidden track)	8:13
Total length:		43:41

Notes

- :^{A} "Coda" is an instrumental song.
- :^{B} The song title, "C.h.a.o.s.m.y.t.h.", came from their friends' initial name.

== Personnel ==
Credits adapted from the liner notes of Zankyo Reference.

One Ok Rock

- Takahiro "Taka" Moriuchi — lead vocals
- Toru Yamashita — guitar
- Ryota Kohama — bass guitar
- Tomoya Kanki — drums

Additional musicians

- Yasuko Murata – viola (9)
- Yoshie Furukawa — cello (9)
- Kazoo – piano (9)

Design

- Kazuaki Seki – art direction
- Daichi Shiono — design
- Rui Hashimoto — photography

Production

- Kenichi Arai — recording
- Hideki Kodera – recording
- Mitsuru Fukuhara – recording
- Ted Jensen — mastering
- Satoru Hiraide — mixing
- Kazutaka Minemori — instrument technician
- Yoshiro "Masuo" Arimatsu — instrument technician
- Masato – instrument technician
- Naoki Iwata — assistant engineer
- Yuji Tanaka – assistant engineer
- Shinya Kondo – assistant engineer
- Yusuke Watanabe – assistant engineer
- Ryota Hattanda – assistant engineer
- Ryosuke Asakawa – assistant engineer
- Akkin – strings arrangement (9)

== Charts ==
=== Weekly charts ===
Weekly chart performance for Zankyo Reference
Chart (2011)	Peak position
Japanese Albums (Oricon)	2
Japanese Albums (Billboard Japan)	2

=== Singles ===
Title	Year	Peak positions	
Title	Year	JPN Oricon	JPN Billboard
"Answer is Near" (アンサイズニア)	2011	6	13
"Re:make/No Scared"	2011	6	10

=== Other charted songs ===
Title	Year	Peak positions
Title	Year	JPN Billboard
"C.h.a.o.s.m.y.t.h."	2011	88

== Certifications ==
Certifications and sales for Zankyo Reference
Region	Certification	Certified units/sales
Japan (RIAJ)	Gold	100,000^{^}
^{^} Shipments figures based on certification alone.
