= One Ok Rock =

Japanese rock band

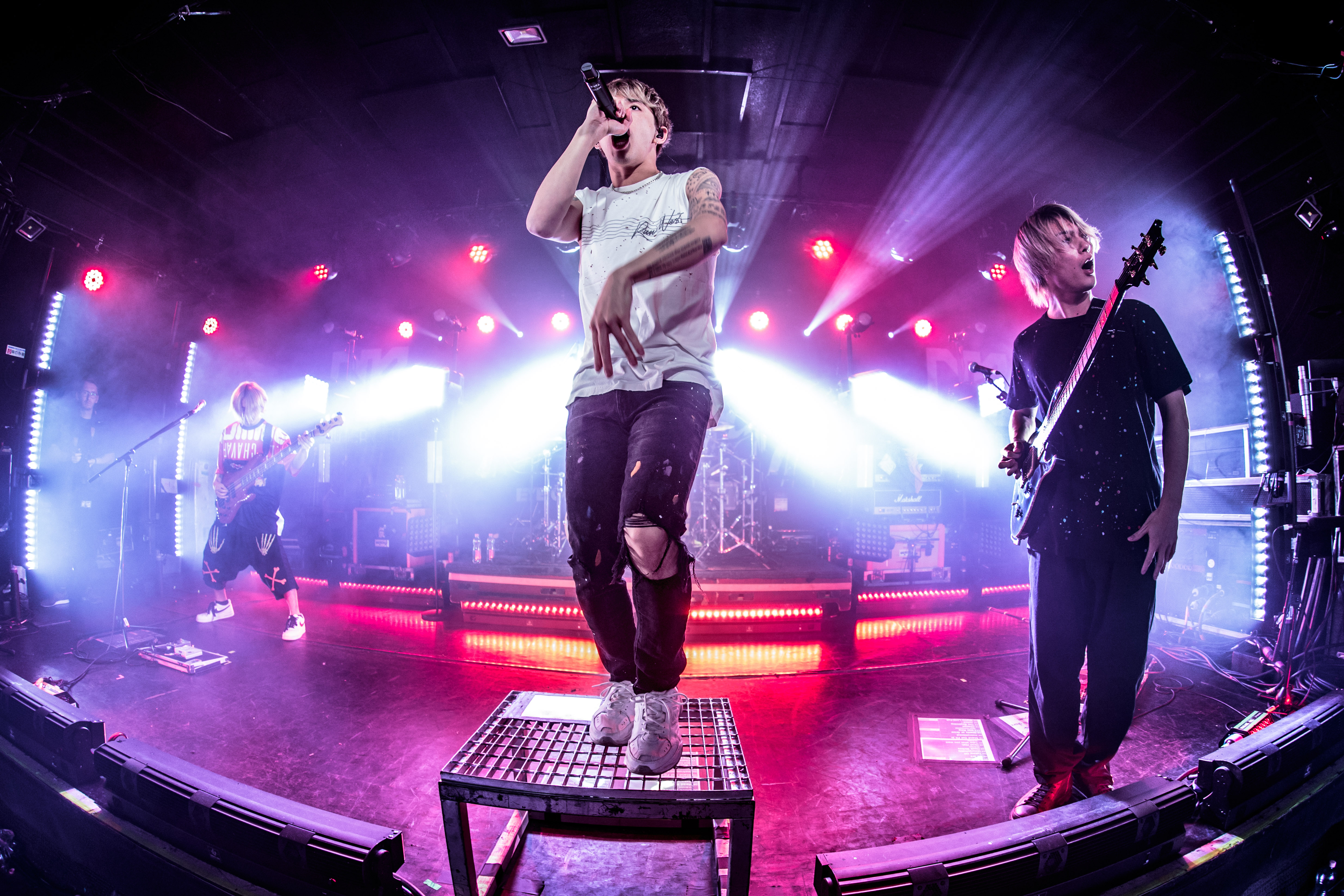
- One Ok Rock performing in Budapest at Dürer Kert in 2019

Background information
- Also known as: OOR; 10969
- Origin: Tokyo, Japan
- Genres: Alternative rock; emo; post-hardcore; pop-punk
- Works: One Ok Rock discography
- Years active: 2005–present
- Labels: Fueled by Ramen; Warner; A-Sketch; 10969 Inc.
- Members: Takahiro Moriuchi; Toru Yamashita; Ryota Kohama; Tomoya Kanki
- Past members: Alexander Reimon Onizawa; Yu Koyanagi
- Website: www.oneokrock.com

One Ok Rock (Japanese: ワンオクロック, Hepburn: Wan Oku Rokku; stylized in all caps) is a Japanese rock band formed in 2005. The band currently consists of vocalist Takahiro Moriuchi, guitarist Toru Yamashita, bassist Ryota Kohama, and drummer Tomoya Kanki. Former members include drummer Yu Koyanagi and guitarist Alexander "Alex" Reimon Onizawa. They play varied styles of music, with songs ranging from alternative rock and emo to post-hardcore and pop-punk.

One Ok Rock was originally affiliated with Amuse since their debut in 2007. The band left Amuse on April 1, 2021, and established their own management agency, named 10969 Inc. They are signed with the Fueled by Ramen record label in the United States.

The band rose to international fame with their 2012 single "The Beginning" from their sixth album Jinsei×Boku=, which led them to concerts and music festivals outside of Asia. Following this success, One Ok Rock began releasing dual versions (Japanese-English and full English) of subsequent albums, with two to three different tracks on each version. Their seventh studio album, 35xxxv, became the band's first to enter Billboard music charts in the US, peaking at No. 11 on Heatseekers Albums, No. 43 on Independent Albums, No. 23 on Hard Rock Albums, and No. 1 on the World Albums chart. The band's eighth album, Ambitions, which incorporated more arena rock and pop-rock, debuted at No. 106 on the Billboard 200 and entered several international charts as well. The band adopted a more electronic and pop sound on their ninth album Eye of the Storm (2019). They experimented with a more rock-centered sound while still incorporating modern pop-rock for their 2022 album, Luxury Disease. They continued to experiment with pop-rock for their 2025 album Detox.

One Ok Rock won Classic Rock Roll of Honour Awards for Eastern Breakthrough Male Band in 2016, and Rock Sound Awards for Best International Band in 2017 and Best Live Performance in 2018. The band was also nominated for two Alternative Press Music Awards – Best International Band in 2016 and Best Breakthrough Band in 2017.

== History ==
=== 2005–2006: Formation and early releases ===
The history of One Ok Rock began on July 29, 2005, when Toru Yamashita, a high school student, wanted to start a band. He invited his childhood friend Ryota Kohama, who was also a member of the hip-hop dance group HEADS they were both in years prior. He told Ryota to learn the bass and asked Alexander Onizawa, who was their senior in school, to join to be their guitarist and his classmate, Yu Koyanagi, to play drums. While searching for a vocalist, Toru found Takahiro Moriuchi, who was in a cover band called Chivalry of Music. Impressed by Taka's singing skills, Toru insisted he join One Ok Rock instead. At first, Taka refused, despite repeated attempts to sway him, but eventually, he joined the band. The band's name was suggested by Koyanagi and comes from "one o'clock", the time that the band used to practice their music on weekends. They chose to play at one o'clock in the morning because it was cheaper to use the rehearsal space during such hours. However, noticing that the Japanese language made no distinction between R's and L's, "O'CLOCK" transformed into "O'CROCK" or "O'KROCK", which later transformed into "OK ROCK". In addition, One Ok Rock can be expressed as "10969" (wan-ō-ku-ro-ku). It is also the name of their management agency they set up in 2021.

The band released their self-produced demo CD "Do You Know A Christmas?" on December 21, 2005. In 2006, they released 2 EPs, "One Ok Rock" and "KEEP IT REAL".

After signing with Amuse, Inc., Yu Koyanagi left the band to pursue an acting career and was replaced by Tomoya Kanki who was a student at the ESP Musical Academy and was already in a band that was not going well. He then joined One Ok Rock in 2006 and became an official member when they debuted in 2007.

=== 2007–2009: Debut album, Beam of Light, Kanjo Effect and departure of Alex ===
In 2007, the band released their debut single, "Naihishinsho", reached number 48 on the Oricon Charts and sold 15,000 copies. Their second and third single, " Yume Yume" and "Et Cetera", replicated that success and charted at number 43 and 29, respectively. After those singles, they released their debut album Zeitakubyō on November 21, 2007, and had their first tour, the Tokyo-Osaka-Nagoya Quattro Tour.

They released their second album Beam of Light in May 2008. In an interview with Rockin'On Japan magazine in June 2012, the band said they did not count this album as an album, but rather as a part of growing up as a band. When they made the album, they had not been in the right mood, but felt that they had to make it to grow as a band. The band came up with many sound sources and ended up making a punk album. The album's confused origins were the reason why they would not play any songs from Beam of Light in live performances. Shortly after releasing Beam of Light, later they performed a gig at Shibuya AX.

They had planned to release two albums in that one year, so they released Kanjou Effect in November 2008. At this point the band had gained more experience and were able to do some more serious recording. They settled into the Western sound they were influenced by. They replaced all their engineers and introduced their music to new producers.

On April 5, 2009, Alex was arrested for groping the leg of a twenty-one-year-old female student on a train. He admitted to the charges and the case was settled out of court. The band reached their weakest point at this time. Ryota intended to leave bass and take up guitar. They felt it was impossible for them to add a new member. The band's next single, "Around the World Shounen", which was planned for a May 6 release as the theme song for the TV drama GodHand Teru, and their nationwide tour were both cancelled. In May 2009, it was announced that One Ok Rock would continue on as a 4-piece band without Alex, who went back to the United States. Toru took his place as lead guitar, and the band re-arranged their songs to be played for one guitar.

=== 2010–2012: Niche Syndrome, music festivals, and Zankyo Reference ===
With the new four-member formation, One Ok Rock released the single "Kanzen Kankaku Dreamer" on February 3, 2010. The song peaked at number nine on the Oricon Singles Chart in Japan. After four months, the band released their fourth studio album titled Niche Syndrome. Released on June 9, 2010, the album peaked at number three on the Billboard's Top Albums Sales chart. For the promotion of Niche Syndrome, One Ok Rock embarked on the "This is my own judgement!" tour initially in five Zepp music halls across the nation in 6 days, starting Sendai, Osaka, Nagoya, Fukuoka and ending in a 2-day concert in Tokyo. The second part the tour took place at sixteen different venues until December 11, 2010. They held a final performance in Nippon Budokan, Tokyo on November 28, followed by the release of a concert DVD This is My Budokan?! on February 16, 2011. On August 6, 7 and 8, One Ok Rock headlined Rock in Japan Festival and Summer Sonic Festival, followed by Rising Sun Rock Festival, Monster Bash, Treasure05X, Mad Ollie, Countdown Japan 2010/2011, and Radio Crazy. The band supported Pay Money to My Pain in their 2010 Stay Real tour, The Hiatus in their Anomaly 2010 tour, and Totalfat in their Overdrive tour.

On February 16, 2011, the band released the single "Answer is Near", later, from April to June of the same year, they performed the "Answer is Alive 2011 tour". After that, One Ok Rock released their first double A-side single "Re:make/No Scared" on July 20, 2011. "No Scared" was the main theme for the Black Rock Shooter: The Game video game. The band's fifth album, Zankyo Reference, was released on October 5, 2011. One Ok Rock announced fourteen dates between November and December 2011 for the Zankyo Reference Tour. The band also announced their final performance for this album as a two-day concert in Yokohama Arena on January 21 and 22, 2012. This was their first time playing in Yokohama Arena, the biggest venue in the Kantō region. The concert was sold out with more than 24,000 attendees. Later, the documentary of the Zankyo Reference Tour and the performance from the second night in Yokohama Arena was released on Blu-ray and DVD on May 30, 2012.

During 2011, One Ok Rock headlined many music festivals, including Jisan Valley Rock Festival in South Korea. In July the band performed at Setstock 2011, followed by Rock in Japan Festival, Rising Sun Rock Festival, Summer Sonic Festival, Monster Bash, Sky Jamboree, and Space Shower's Sweet Love Shower. At the end of the year, they headlined Radio Crazy and Countdown Japan once more.

The band declared their first overseas tour in Start Walking The World on May and June 2012, covering Japan, South Korea, Taiwan, and Singapore. They headlined Rock in Japan Festival on the main stage, as well as Summer Sonic 2012, and additionally, Oga Namahage Rock Festival, Rising Sun Rock Festival, and Sweet Love Shower. Their next single, "The Beginning", was chosen as the theme song for the live action movie adaptation of the Rurouni Kenshin manga, and was released on August 22, 2012, reaching number 2 on the Billboard Japan Hot 100. Later, "The Beginning" won two awards: Best Rock Video from the 2013 MTV Video Music Awards Japan and a second award as Best Your Choice in Space Shower Music Video Awards.

=== 2013–2014: Jinsei×Boku=, Fool Cool Rock, and Worldwide Tour ===
On January 9, 2013, One Ok Rock released the double single "Deeper Deeper/Nothing Helps", and hit 2nd place on the Oricon charts. The song "Nothing Helps" was used for the Japanese version of the video game DmC: Devil May Cry, and "Deeper Deeper" was used for the commercial of Suzuki Swift Sport in Japan. Their sixth full-length album Jinsei×Boku= was released on March 6, 2013, and managed to reach second place on the Oricon weekly chart. In October 2013 the band went on their first tour outside Asia and visited Europe for five concerts. Most of the concerts in Europe were sold out almost immediately.

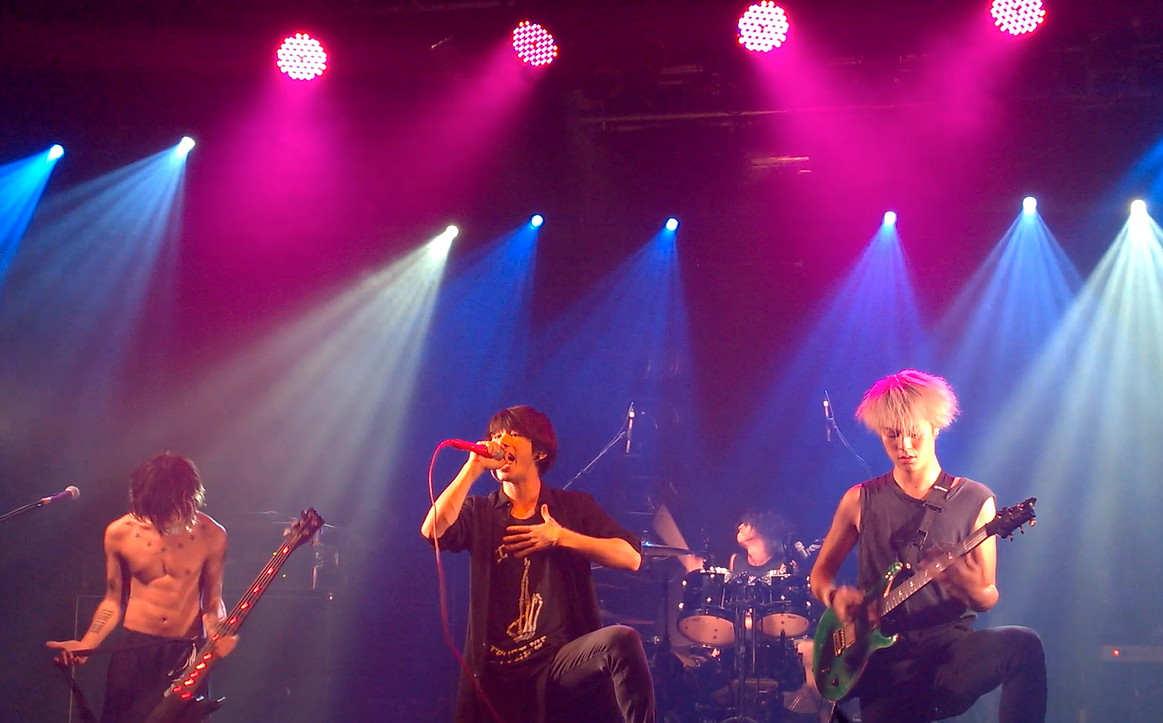
One Ok Rock performing in London, UK, December 2014

On January 12, 2014, their album producer John Feldmann related that One Ok Rock had already started recording their forthcoming album. In February 2014 they visited the US to hold two concerts in New York and Los Angeles and added two more dates in Philadelphia and Toronto in May. They also performed at Rock on the Range in Columbus, Ohio, their first festival outside Asia. On May 16, the documentary film about their last Europe and Asia Tour, Fool Cool Rock, was released and played for a limited time of four weeks at select theaters. The film, directed by Hiroyuki Nakano, was released on DVD and Blu-ray in November 2014, with promotional screenings in Bangkok, Thailand, and Hong Kong.

In June and July 2014 they joined Vans Warped Tour 2014 and performed in eighteen cities in North America. On July 30, 2014, One Ok Rock released the double A-side single "Mighty Long Fall/Decision", and while "Mighty Long Fall", was the theme song for the movie sequel of Rurouni Kenshin entitled Rurouni Kenshin: Kyoto Inferno, the song "Decision" is the theme song for their documentary film Foo Cool Rock. The music video for "Decision" released on August 20, 2014, is a compilation of footage from their tours in Europe and Asia. In September 2014, the song "Heartache" became part of the Rurouni Kenshin: The Legend Ends's soundtrack. Subsequently, in September 2014, One Ok Rock held a two-day stadium concert in Yokohama Stadium in front of 60,000 people called Mighty Long Fall Live at Yokohama Stadium 2014. This was their first time performing in a stadium.

One Ok Rock announced U.S., South American and European tours in late 2014. They performed at Knotfest, in both Japan and the United States, with an additional two dates for the United States in October. At the end of October 2014, the band started their first tour in Latin America visiting five countries. On November 27, they were a guest performer in Hoobastank's Japan tour and returned their tour, this time in Europe, performing in ten more countries in December.

=== 2015–2016: 35xxxv and international success ===
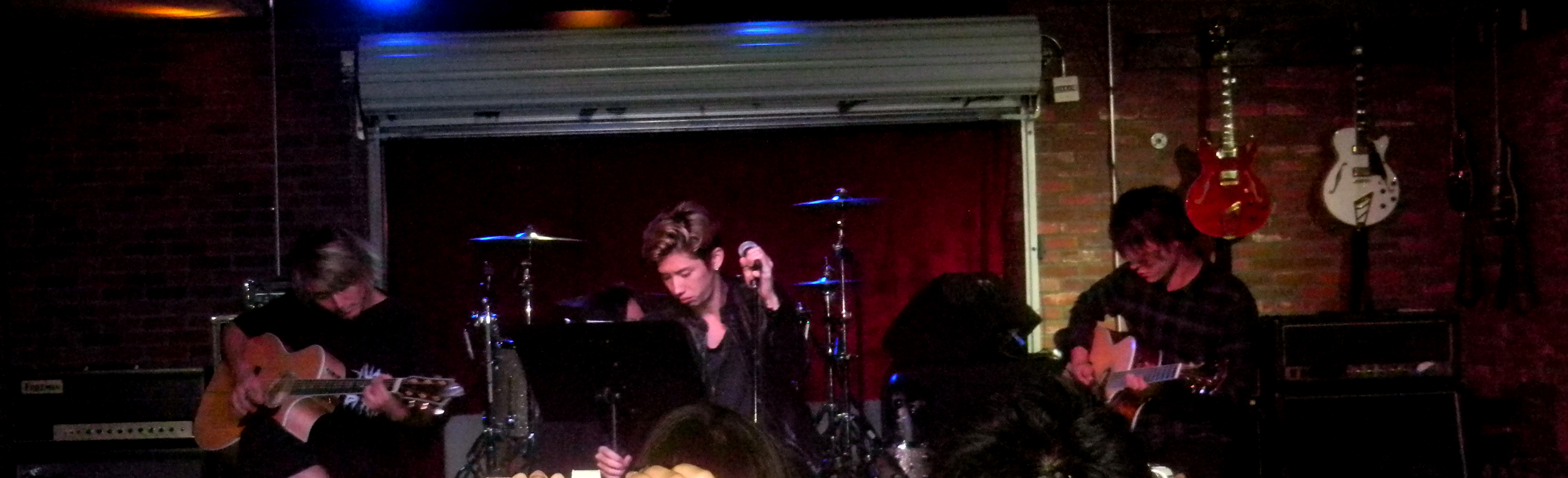
One Ok Rock performing at Lucky Strike Live, October 22, 2015

On October 9, 2014, the band announced that next album would be released in February 2015. The official website of the band was redesigned along with this announcement. Around December 16, 2014, the band revealed the cover and name of their new Japanese upcoming album, 35xxxv. The album peaked at #11 on Billboard's Heatseekers Albums. This chart is for new and upcoming musicians, which is usually a stepping stone towards the Billboard 200. On the same week, it peaked at number 43 on Billboard Independent Albums. Then it peaked at number 23 on the Billboard Hard Rock Albums Chart and reached #1 on the Billboard World Albums Chart.

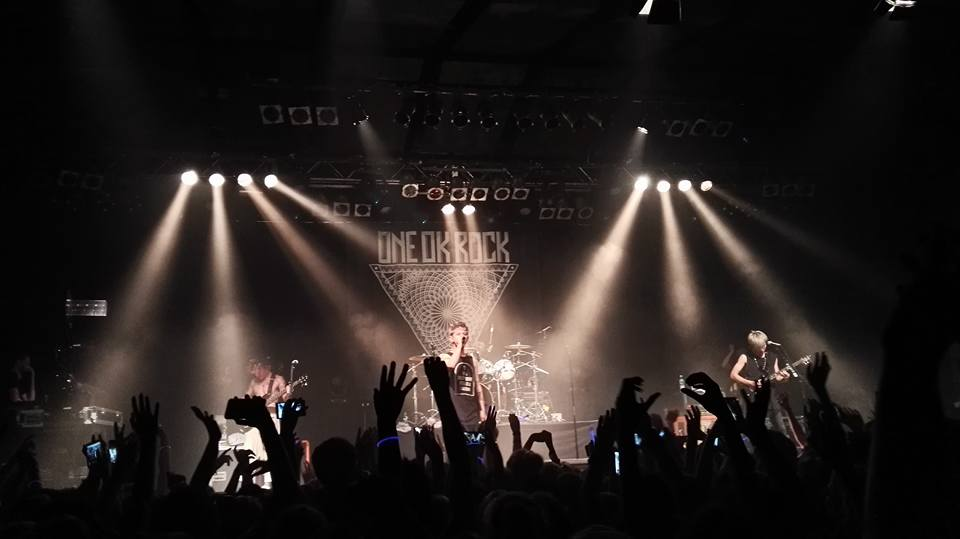
One Ok Rock performing in Poland in 2016

In April 2015, they opened alongside Finch for Yellowcard's U.S. tour. Following that, the band returned to Japan for their extensive album tour starting from May to September. The final concerts included bands like Issues and Against the Current. In July 2015, One Ok Rock officially announced that they have signed with Warner Bros. Records and planned to re-release 35xxxv as a deluxe edition containing all English tracks on September 25, 2015. The band was set to have a North American tour in fall 2015 with a few selected cities as headlining artists, but was the opening act for All Time Low and Sleeping with Sirens for the most part. One Ok Rock also toured Europe and Asia to promote their album.

On October 17, 2015, 35xxxv (Deluxe Edition) debuted at No. 20 on Billboard’s Heatseekers Albums and its highest peak position is at No. 17.

One Ok Rock returned to Japan for their One Thousand Miles Tour 2016 concert along with All Time Low and PVRIS. In early 2016, it was announced that One Ok Rock would open for Issues and Crown the Empire on the Monster Energy Outbreak Tour to promote their English album in the U.S. They also continued to tour in Europe at different music festivals and solo shows.

On March 11, 2016, the band released a new song, "Always Coming Back", that was featured in NTT Docomo's phone commercial series, "Kanjou no Subete / Nakama". In mid-2016, One Ok Rock joined 5 Seconds of Summer on the first North American leg of their Sounds Live Feels Live World Tour.

To commemorate the 10th anniversary of My Chemical Romance's album The Black Parade, Rock Sound announced a special cover album, including One Ok Rock. The band covered the first track, "The End".

On September 10 and 11, the band held a special live concert at Nagisaen, Shizuoka, Japan for a crowd of 110,000 spectators. One Ok Rock also announced the digital single release of "Taking Off" on September 16, 2016, under Fueled by Ramen. The song was used as a theme song for the Japanese film Museum starring Shun Oguri. Later at a special live concert, Taka announced that their 8th studio album would be released the following year following an album tour.

On October 8, Sum 41 released the Japanese edition of their album, 13 Voices, including the song "War" featuring Taka. Deryck Whibley from Sum 41 mentioned to Alternative Press Japan that "It was great to collaborate with Taka on our new song called War. I am a huge fan of his voice and of One Ok Rock and I think that our voices work very well together".

On November 13, 2016, NHK (Nippon Hōsō Kyōkai, a Japan Broadcasting Corporation) held One Ok Rock 18 Festival (18 FES) where One Ok Rock and 1,000 youths (17 – 19 years old from the whole country) sang together on one stage. On November 18, 2016, One Ok Rock released "Bedroom Warfare", the second single from the upcoming album. The third single, "I was King", was released on December 16, 2016.

=== 2017: Ambitions ===
The yellow background of the album cover of Ambitions symbolizes hope

On January 1, 2017, One Ok Rock opened a special site "World Ambitions", in celebration of the new album, Ambitions. World Ambitions was a website that visually represented images of "hope" being shared and spread from users around the world through the website and Twitter/Instagram. People from all over the world could upload pictures with yellow in it, symbolizing hope and connecting them all. Users could share their images through SNS (Twitter, Instagram). On January 9, 2017, the band released a single, titled "We Are".

The Japanese version of Ambitions was released on January 11, 2017, under A-Sketch. The English version of the album was released on January 13, 2017, by Fueled by Ramen. Ambitions features collaborations with Avril Lavigne on the Japanese version of the album, Alex Gaskarth from All Time Low on the English version of the album, and the Australian band 5 Seconds of Summer on both. Alternative Press declared the collaboration song "Jaded" (with Alex Gaskarth) as the best collaboration song of 2017.

In January 2017, the band went on their North American tour for 6 concerts. From February to May 2017, they held 32 concerts in Japanese arenas.

On February 9, 2017, the band released a limited CD single "Skyfall", which was only sold during the "Ambitions" Japan Tour at the show venues. The CD contains 3 songs: "Skyfall" (featuring MAH from SiM, Masato Hayakawa from Coldrain, and Koie from Crossfaith), "Right by your side", and "Manhattan Beach".

On May 2, 2017, it was announced that One Ok Rock would open Linkin Park's One More Light Tour in North America for 4 dates and in Japan for 3 shows. Later on July 21, 2017, it was announced that their North American Tour got cancelled because of Linkin Park frontman Chester Bennington's suicide on July 20, 2017, a week before their shows; while Linkin Park's final leg in Japan was cancelled on October 3, 2017. One Ok Rock paid tribute to Chester Bennington by covering Linkin Park's song "One More Light" during their live performances. Taka participated in the memorial concert for Bennington, titled "Linkin Park & Friends", singing "Somewhere I Belong".

=== 2018–2020: Eye of the Storm ===
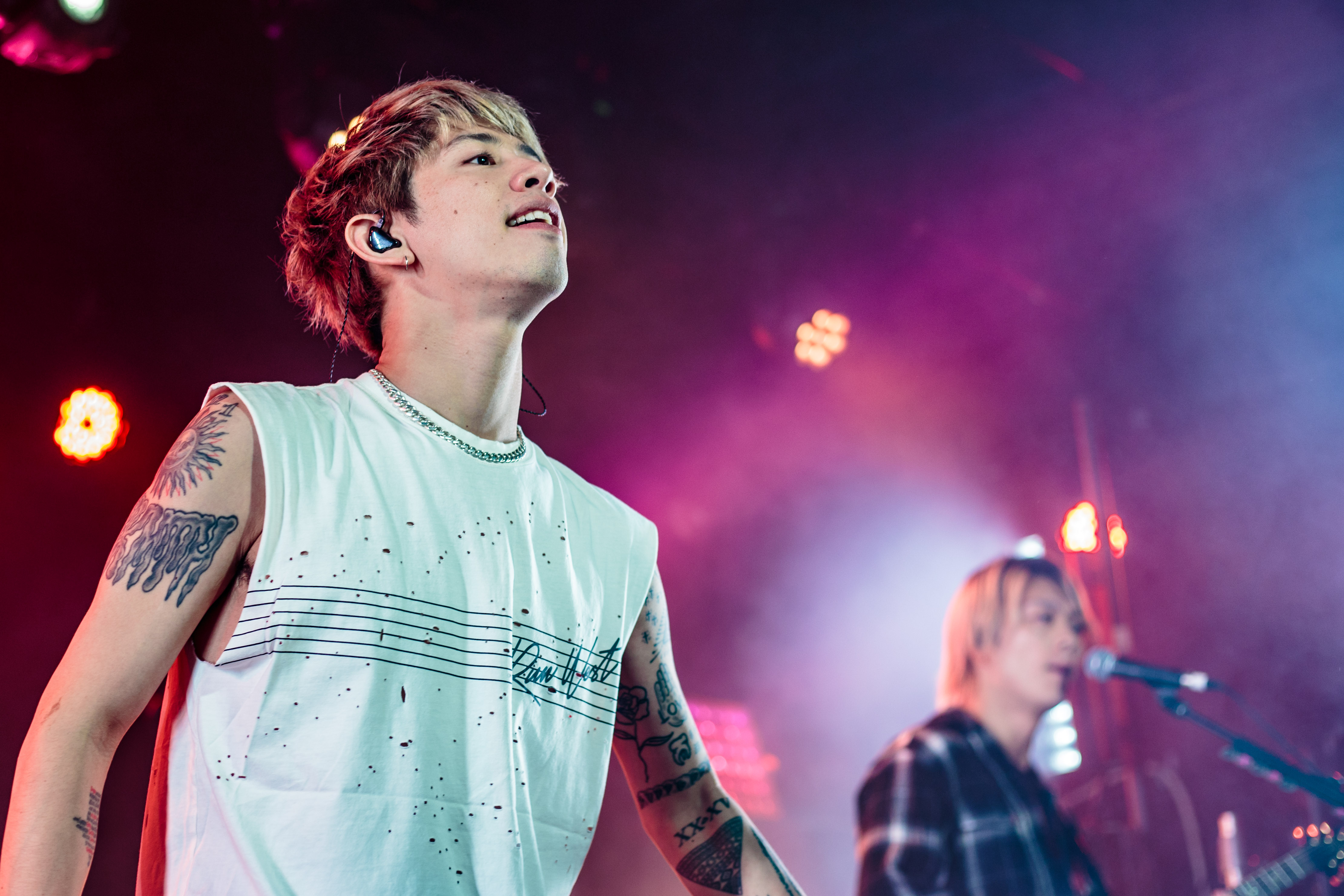
Taka and Toru performing in Budapest at Dürer Kert

On February 16, 2018, they released their first single of 2018, "Change". The song was made by vocalist Taka alongside the band's producer for a HondaJet commercial. The band remained relatively silent throughout the rest of the year (with the exception of embarking on their Ambitions Dome Tour in Japan, announced the previous year), until the announcement of a small, four date tour with an orchestra in Japan in late October, as well as a small European tour in December.

On November 23, the band announced their forthcoming album, Eye of the Storm. The second single, "Stand Out Fit In", considered the lead single for the album, was released the same day with a music video. "Change" was also featured on the album. On February 1, 2019, the band released the third and final single from the album, "Wasted Nights". The song serves as the theme song for the film Kingdom. American singer-songwriter Kiiara is the sole guest feature on the album on the track "In the Stars", which was the theme song for the film Fortuna's Eye. Eye of the Storm was released in Japan on February 13, 2019, via A-Sketch and outside of Japan on February 15, 2019, via Fueled By Ramen.

The band toured with Waterparks and Stand Atlantic in a headlining North American tour during February and March to support "Eye of the Storm". They also supported Ed Sheeran on the second Asian leg of the ÷ Tour throughout April and early May, and performed a headlining tour in Europe throughout the rest of May, with support from dream pop band Anteros and producer Dan Lancaster. One Ok Rock played a short U.S. tour of Oregon, California, and Mexico during July, during which they also played the Vans Warped Tour. Rock band Weathers served as support during this tour. One Ok Rock performed an arena tour of Japan from September 2019 to January 2020. In March 2020, the band toured Australia with American pop rock band Set It Off and Australian pop punk band Stateside serving as support. The band was set to finish their tour with an Asian leg spanning from April to July 2020. However, on March 17, 2020, the band announced that the tour dates would be postponed due to the COVID-19 pandemic, with the shows ultimately being cancelled.

=== 2020–2023: Luxury Disease and 10969 Inc. ===
On August 24, 2020, the band announced a livestreamed, stadium concert, entitled Field of Wonder, which took place at the Zozo Marine Stadium in Chiba City, Japan on October 11, 2020 without spectators. The concert was broadcast to worldwide audiences, and was the band's first performance since the beginning of the COVID-19 pandemic.

In 2021, the band left Amuse, Inc. and established their own management agency 10969 Inc. The band provided a soundtrack song for Rurouni Kenshin: The Final titled "Renegades". The song was co-written by Ed Sheeran and Coldrain's frontman Masato Hayakawa and was released on April 16, 2021, via Fueled By Ramen for both Japanese and International versions. The band provided a new song for Rurouni Kenshin: The Beginning in 2021, titled "Broken Heart of Gold" and released a trailer of the movie featuring the song on their official YouTube channel. The song was released on May 27, 2021.

On July 31, 2021, One Ok Rock held a livestreamed acoustic performance titled "Day to Night Acoustic Session" from the Kawaguchiko Stellar Theater in Yamanashi, Japan. They played more than ten songs, including a cover of Hikaru Utada's 1999 song "First Love". On October 21, 2021, One Ok Rock released the documentary Flip a Coin on Netflix. The next day, on October 22, the band released the single "Wonder" through Fueled By Ramen.

On June 21, 2022, it was announced that they will release a new single, "Save Yourself", on June 24 along with the music video. One Ok Rock announced their new album, Luxury Disease, would be available on September 9, 2022. On August 28, 2022, they announced another single "Let Me Let You Go" to be released on August 30 along with a Live Documentary Video. On September 6, 2022, the band released a new single, "Vandalize", which was simultaneously announced to be featured as one of the ending themes for the video game Sonic Frontiers. One Ok Rock announced tour as the opening act for Muse's Will of the People World Tour along with Evanescence in the United States and Canada in February and March 2023, as well as joining Muse for their European tour dates alongside Royal Blood. During the Europe tour they also headlined separate shows across the continent as part of the Luxury Disease Tour.

On December 11, 2022, the band announced Luxury Disease Japan tour for 2023 performing in all dome stadiums in Japan. On August 24, 2023, the band released a new single, "Make It Out Alive", in collaboration with Monster Hunter Now, a mobile game that launched on September 14. The music video was released on August 29, 2023. On October 6, 2023, One Ok Rock released "Prove", the opening theme for the anime Beyblade X. One Ok Rock and My First Story – whose vocalist is Taka's brother, Hiro – held a one-night-only live show "VS" at Tokyo Dome on November 14, 2023.

=== 2024–present: Detox and World Tour ===
On May 13, 2024 lead singer Taka announced on his Instagram live that the band finished recording their new album in Los Angeles, which will have a more hard rock sound. The band also announced the 2024 Premonition World Tour, with stadium concerts in Tokyo, Kaohsiung, Düsseldorf, Paris, London, Toronto and Los Angeles in September and October. On May 28, they announced that a new song, called "Dystopia" was chosen to be the ending theme song of Nippon Television's news program, News Zero. On June 11, the band announced their new single "Delusion:All" chosen to be the theme song for the 4th Kingdom movie which to be release on July 12, 2024 alongside the movie,"+matter" new single announced for December 6, 2024.

The band announced their eleventh studio album, which they titled Detox and scheduled for release on February 21, 2025.

On January 19, 2025, the band released the single "Puppets Can’t Control You", which is used as the theme song for the Japanese television drama Mikami Sensei.

One Ok Rock performed as opening act on Linkin Park's From Zero World Tour in France, on July 11, 2025.

In 2025, the band's Taka contributed to the original soundtrack of the Netflix original series Glass Heart in 2025.

== Artistry ==
One Ok Rock's influences are Linkin Park, Foo Fighters, Good Charlotte, Ellegarden, and the Used. The group's initial idea began when Yamashita wanted to start a rock band and invited Kohama to join him. Good Charlotte's influences are seen on their first album, Zeitakubyō; while the Foo Fighters' influences can be seen on their second and third albums, Beam of Light and Kanjō Effect.

In their sixth album Jinsei×Boku=, they mentioned that this album was influenced heavily by Linkin Park's screaming and yell-rapping. Their seventh album 35xxxv, was produced along with producer John Feldmann. The album reached first place on the Oricon Album weekly ranking, making it the first time the band had reached the top of the list. In addition, it was the first One Ok Rock album to be released in a separate English language international edition in addition to the Japanese version. Their eighth album Ambitions also topped the Oricon Album weekly ranking.

With regards to songwriting, Taka said that he always needed a theme he could write about and he usually concentrates on what kind of message he wants to convey and what he wants to express. Usually melodies come first and then he writes the lyrics in Japanese and English. However, since he is not a native speaker of English, American producers help him express his thoughts properly.

"I think it’s something I’ve always had within me. If someone asks me to create something, it’s not like I can’t do it. Melodies come to me 365 days a year—it’s kind of like a capsule toy machine (laughs). If I’m told to create, I can create".

When the band was created, Taka stated that the band was started "with a sense of anger" as their driving force, and expressed the entire band's desire to express and channel their frustrations with the world. As time went on, as he stated that the anger he once had felt began to fade, with him stating that it was incredibly rewarding to have so many fans, and to be able to perform in various venues as the reason why. Taka also mentioned that the band touring across Japan, alongside the rest of the world, had felt as if it was an important way to communicate the band's message.

== Band members ==
Current

- Takahiro "Taka" Moriuchi (森内 貴寬, Moriuchi Takahiro) – lead vocals (2005–present), additional guitars (2009–present)
- Toru Yamashita (山下 亨, Yamashita Tōru) – lead guitar (2009–present), rhythm guitar, vocals (2005–present)
- Ryota Kohama (小浜 良太, Kohama Ryōta) – bass guitar, backing vocals (2005–present)
- Tomoya "Tomo" Kanki (神吉 智也, Kanki Tomoya) – drums, percussion, backing vocals (2006–present)

Former

- Alexander Reimon "Alex" Onizawa (鬼澤 アレクサンダー 礼門, Onizawa Alexander Reimon) – lead guitar, backing vocals (2005–2009)
- Yu Koyanagi (小柳 友, Koyanagi Yū) – drums, percussion (2005–2006)

== Discography ==
- Zeitakubyo (2007)
- Beam of Light (2008)
- Kanjō Effect (2008)
- Niche Syndrome (2010)
- Zankyo Reference (2011)
- Jinsei×Boku= (2013)
- 35xxxv (2015)
- Ambitions (2017)
- Eye of the Storm (2019)
- Luxury Disease (2022)
- Detox (2025)

== Filmography ==
- Fool Cool Rock! One Ok Rock Documentary Film (2014)
- One Ok Rock: Flip a Coin (2021)
- One Ok Rock: Detox Japan Tour 2025 at Nissan Stadium (2026)

== Tours and concerts ==
=== As a headliner ===
==== Japan ====
- Shredder in the World (世の中シュレッダー) (2007)
- One Ok Rock Tour 2008 "What Time Is It Now?" (2008)
- One Ok Rock 2009 "Emotion Effect" Tour (2009)
- "This is my own judgment" Tour (2010)
- Answer is aLive Tour (2011)
- One Ok Rock 2011–2012"残響リファレンス"Tour (2011–2012)
- "The Beginning" Tour (2012)
- One Ok Rock 2013 "人生×君="Tour (2013)
- One Ok Rock 2014 "Mighty Long Fall at Yokohama Stadium" (2014)
- One Ok Rock 2015 "35xxxv" Japan Tour (2015)
- One Thousand Miles Tour (2016)
- One Ok Rock 2016 Special Live in Nagisaen (2016)
- One Ok Rock 2017 "Ambitions" Arena Tour (2017)
- One Ok Rock 2018 "Ambitions" Japan Dome Tour (2018)
- One Ok Rock with Orchestra Japan Tour 2018 (2018)
- One Ok Rock 2019-2020 "Eye of the Storm" Japan Tour (2019–2020)
- One Ok Rock 2020 "Field of Wonder" at Stadium Live Streaming (2020)
- One Ok Rock 2021 "Day to Night Acoustic Sessions" at Stellar Theater (2021)
- One Ok Rock 2023 "Luxury Disease" Japan Dome Tour (2023)
- SUPER DRY SPECIAL LIVE Organized by One Ok Rock (2024)
- One Ok Rock 2025 "Detox" Japan Tour (2025)

==== International ====
- "Start Walking The World Tour" (2012)
- "Who are you?? Who are we??" Tour (2013)
- One Ok Rock 2014 South America & Europe Tour (2014)
- One Ok Rock 2015 "35xxxv" North America, Europe, Asia Tour (2015–2016)
- One Ok Rock European Tour 2016 (2016)
- One Ok Rock 2017 "Ambitions" World Tour (2017)
- One Ok Rock "Eye of the Storm" North America, Europe Tour (2019)
- One Ok Rock Eye of the Storm World Tour 2019 -US & Mexico- (2019)
- One Ok Rock "Luxury Disease" North America Tour (2022)
- One Ok Rock "Luxury Disease" Europe, Asia Tour (2023)
- One Ok Rock Premonition World Tour 2024 (2024)
- One Ok Rock "Detox" Latin America, South America, North America and Europe Tour (2025)
- One Ok Rock "Detox" Oceania and Asia Tour (2026)

=== As a co-headliner ===
- Knotfest in US (with Various Artists) (2014)
- Vans Warped Tour (with Various Artists) (2014)
- Rock on the Range in US (with Various Artists) (2014)
- Soundwave in Australia (with Various Artists) (2015)
- Aftershock Festival in US (with Various Artists) (2015)
- Monster Energy Outbreak Tour (with Issues, Crown the Empire, One Ok Rock and Night Verses) (2016)
- Rock am Ring and Rock im Park in Germany (with Various Artists) (2016)
- Download Fest in France and UK (with Various Artists) (2016)
- Pinkpop Fest in Netherlands (with Various Artists) (2016)
- Self Help Fest in US (with Various Artists) (2016)
- Reading and Leeds Festivals in England (with Various Artists) (2017)
- Czad Festiwal in Poland (with Various Artists) (2017)
- Vans Warped Tour in US (with Various Artists) (2019)
- Good Things in Australia (with Various Artists) (2022)

=== As an opening act & Special guest ===
- Hoobastank Japan Tour (with guest One Ok Rock) (2014)
- The Smashing Pumpkins Sidewave in Australia (with One Ok Rock and Gerard Way as supporting acts) (2015)
- Yellowcard Tour (with One Ok Rock and Finch as opening acts) (2015)
- All Time Low "Back to the Future Hearts Tour" (with Sleeping with Sirens, One Ok Rock, and Neck Deep) (2015)
- 5 Seconds Of Summer "Sounds Live Feels Live Tour" in North America (with One Ok Rock and Hey Violet) (summer 2016)
- Ed Sheeran "Divide Asia Tour" (special guest One Ok Rock) (2019)
- Muse "Will of the People World Tour" in the US and Canada, (special guest One Ok Rock and Evanescence), and in Europe (with Royal Blood and One Ok Rock) (2023)
- Linkin Park "From Zero World Tour" in France (with JPEGMafia and One Ok Rock as opening acts) (2025)

== Awards and nominations ==
Name of the award ceremony, year presented, category, nominee(s) of the award, and the result of the nomination
Award ceremony	Year	Category	Nominee(s)/work(s)	Result	Ref.
Alternative Press Music Awards	2016	Best International Band	One Ok Rock	Nominated	
Alternative Press Music Awards	2017	Best Breakthrough Band	One Ok Rock	Nominated	
Berlin Music Video Awards	2026	Best Editor	"C.U.R.I.O.S.I.T.Y."	Nominated	
CD Shop Awards	2014	Finalist Award	Jinsei×Boku=	Won	
Classic Rock Roll of Honour Awards	2016	Eastern Breakthrough Male Band	One Ok Rock	Won	
Isum Bridal Music Awards	2018	Music Award	"Wherever You Are"	Won	
Japan Gold Disc Award	2018	Best 5 Albums	Ambitions	Won	
MTV Europe Music Awards	2013	Best Japanese Act	One Ok Rock	Nominated	
MTV Europe Music Awards	2014	Best Japanese Act	One Ok Rock	Nominated	
MTV Europe Music Awards	2015	Best Japanese Act	One Ok Rock	Nominated	
MTV Europe Music Awards	2016	Best Japanese Act	One Ok Rock	Won	
MTV Video Music Awards Japan	2011	Best Rock Video	"Jibun Rock" (じぶんROCK)	Nominated	
MTV Video Music Awards Japan	2012	Best Rock Video	"Answer is Near" (アンサイズニア)	Won	
MTV Video Music Awards Japan	2013	Best Rock Video	"The Beginning"	Won	
MTV Video Music Awards Japan	2013	Best Video from a Film	"The Beginning"	Won	
MTV Video Music Awards Japan	2014	Best Rock Video	"Be the light"	Won	
MTV Video Music Awards Japan	2015	Best Group Video – Japan	"Mighty Long Fall"	Nominated	
MTV Video Music Awards Japan	2019	Artist of the Year	One Ok Rock	Won	
Rock Sound Awards	2017	Best International Band	One Ok Rock	Won	
Rock Sound Awards	2018	Best Live Performance	One Ok Rock	Won	
Rock Sound Awards	2024	Rock Sound 25 Icons	One Ok Rock	Won	
Rock Sound Awards	2025	The Hall of Fame Award	One Ok Rock	Won	
Space Shower Music Video Awards	2013	Best Your Choice	"The Beginning"	Won	
Space Shower Music Video Awards	2016	Best Active Overseas	One Ok Rock	Won	
Space Shower Music Video Awards	2016	Best Punk/Loud Rock Artist	One Ok Rock	Nominated	
Space Shower Music Video Awards	2017	Best Rock Artist	One Ok Rock	Nominated	
Space Shower Music Video Awards	2018	Best Active Overseas	One Ok Rock	Won	
Space Shower Music Video Awards	2018	Best Group Artist	One Ok Rock	Won	
Space Shower Music Video Awards	2018	People's Choice	One Ok Rock	Nominated	
Space Shower Music Video Awards	2019	Best Group Artist	One Ok Rock	Nominated	
Space Shower Music Video Awards	2019	People's Choice	One Ok Rock	Nominated	
Space Shower Music Video Awards	2020	Artist of the Year	One Ok Rock	Won	
Space Shower Music Video Awards	2020	Best Group Artist	One Ok Rock	Won	
Space Shower Music Video Awards	2020	People's Choice	One Ok Rock	Nominated	
