= Make It Out Alive =

Single by One Ok Rock
- Language: English
- Released: 25 August 2023
- Recorded: 2016; 2023
- Genre: Hard rock • alternative metal
- Length: 3:30
- Label: Fueled by Ramen
- Songwriters: Takahiro Moriuchi; Kane Churko; Jamil Kazmi
- Producers: Kane Churko; Jordan Fish

One Ok Rock singles chronology
"Vandalize" (2022)	"Make It Out Alive" (2023)	"Delusion:All" (2024)

Music video
- "Make It Out Alive" on YouTube

"Make It Out Alive" is a song by Japanese rock band One Ok Rock. The song was written by Takahiro Moriuchi, Kane Churko and Jamil Kazmi, and produced by Kane Churko and Jordan Fish. It was released on 25 August 2023 as a single.

The song serves as collaboration with Capcom and Niantic for use in the mobile game Monster Hunter Now.

== Background ==
The song was originally written in 2016 for the band's eighth studio album, Ambitions. However, the song was scrapped from the album, and the band decided to rerecord the song in 2023.

In an interview uploaded to the official Monster Hunter Now Instagram page, vocalist Takahiro Moriuchi explained about remaking "Make It Out Alive" for the game:

When we got the offer, we chose a song that we all thought really fits the game. Then we pulled it apart and basically remade it. That's how the song was born.

== Music video ==
The music video for "Make It Out Alive" was directed by Yasuhiro Arafune and was released on 29 August 2023 on the band's YouTube channel.

The video starts off with the band performing in the middle of Shibuya Crossing, then shows scenes from Monster Hunter Now, including a Hunter running as Diablos roam around Shibuya, and the Hunter pulling out a sword that was partially buried on the ground and pointing it sword at the Diablos.

== Charts ==
Chart performance for "Make It Out Alive"
Chart (2023)	Peak position
Japan Hot 100 (Billboard)	17
Japan Combined Singles (Oricon)	30

== Certifications ==
Certifications for "Make It Out Alive"
Region	Certification	Certified units/sales
Streaming
Japan (RIAJ)	Gold	50,000,000^{†}
^{†} Streaming-only figures based on certification alone.
