= Tomoya Kanki =

Japanese drummer (born 1987)

- 神吉 智也
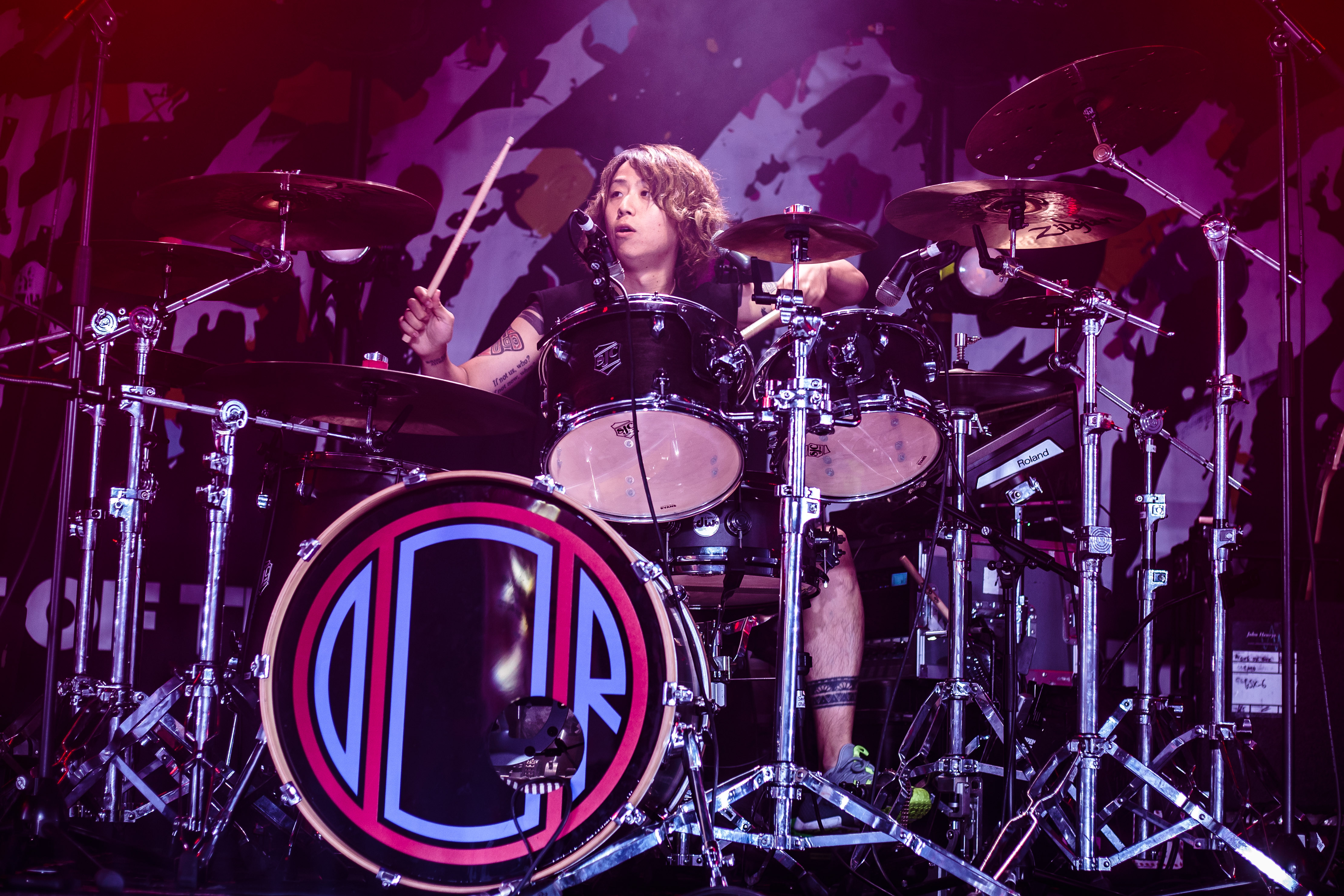
- Tomoya at Dürer Kert in Budapest, 2019
- Born: Kanki Tomoya; June 27, 1987 (age 39); Hyōgo Prefecture, Japan
- Occupations: Musician; drummer
- Spouse: (m. 2017)
- Children: 3
- Musical career
- Genres: Alternative rock; post-hardcore
- Instruments: Drums; percussion
- Years active: 2006–present
- Labels: Fueled by Ramen; Warner Bros.; 10969 Inc.
- Member of: One Ok Rock
- Website: oneokrock.com

Tomoya Kanki (Japanese: 神吉 智也, Hepburn: Kanki Tomoya; born June 27, 1987, in Hyogo), better known mononymously as Tomoya, is a Japanese musician and drummer of the band One Ok Rock.

== Life and career ==
Tomoya is the youngest member of ONE OK ROCK. In junior high school, he belonged to the percussion group in a brass band club, playing various percussion instruments such as tambourine and xylophone. He formed a band in the fall of his first year in high school, and started the band in earnest. After graduated from high school, he came to Tokyo and studied at a technical college.

Tomoya attended ESP Musical Academy where one of his lecturers who was in a band introduced him to a band they had played with earlier that was looking for a drummer. That band was One Ok Rock and after a period of playing as support, he formally joined a month before their major debut. He often updates the One Ok Rock blog.

Tomoya and Ryota Kohama composed the song "Deeper Deeper" together.

On June 9, 2017, he announced that he had gotten married. He has three sons, born in November 2017, May 2019, and March 2021.

== Equipment ==
Tomoya mainly plays drums as his instrument. He has also played percussion and xylophone.

== See also ==
- One Ok Rock discography
