= Toru Yamashita =

Japanese musician (born 1988)

- 山下 亨
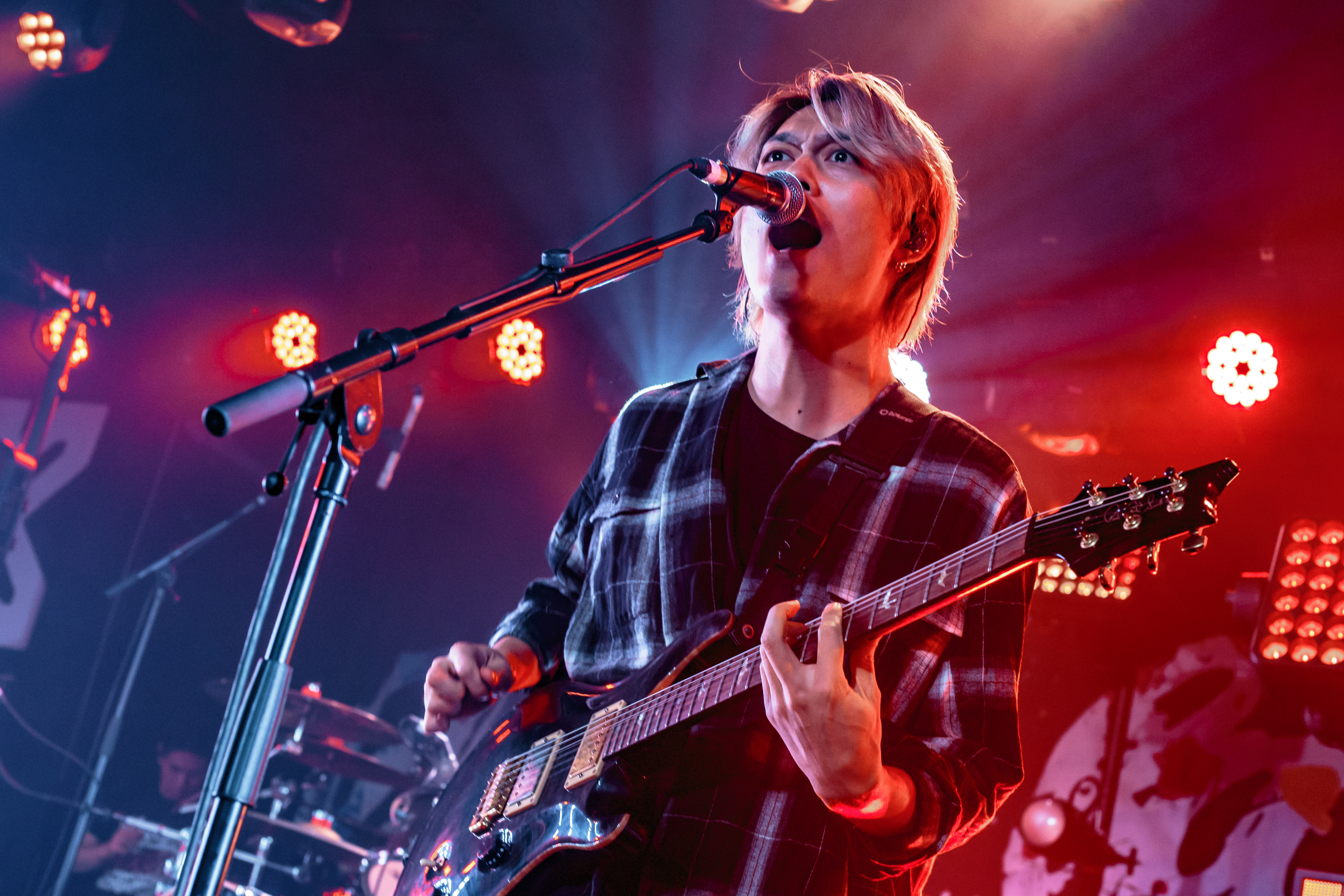
- Toru at Dürer Kert in Budapest, 2019
- Born: Tōru Yamashita; December 7, 1988 (age 37); Moriguchi, Osaka, Japan
- Occupations: Musician; composer; actor
- Spouse: Aya Ōmasa (m. 2021)
- Children: 1
- Musical career
- Genres: Alternative rock; post-hardcore
- Instruments: Guitar; vocals
- Years active: 2000–present
- Labels: Fueled by Ramen; Warner Bros.; 10969 Inc.
- Member of: One Ok Rock
- Formerly of: Heads
- Website: oneokrock.com

Toru Yamashita (Japanese: 山下 亨, Hepburn: Yamashita Tōru; born December 7, 1988, in Osaka), better known by his stage name Toru, is a Japanese musician, best known for being the guitarist and leader of the rock band One Ok Rock.

He was in the hip-hop dance group Heads along with Ryota Kohama from One Ok Rock before they disbanded in 2002.

== Early life ==
Toru was born on December 7, 1988, in Osaka, Japan before moving to Tokyo. Ryota Kohama, bassist from One Ok Rock, is his childhood friend. With two other men, Kohei and Takuya, Toru and Ryota formed a hip-hop dance group called Heads when they were fifth and sixth-graders. They participated in dance competitions in the late 1990s, between the years 1995 to 1999.

== Career ==
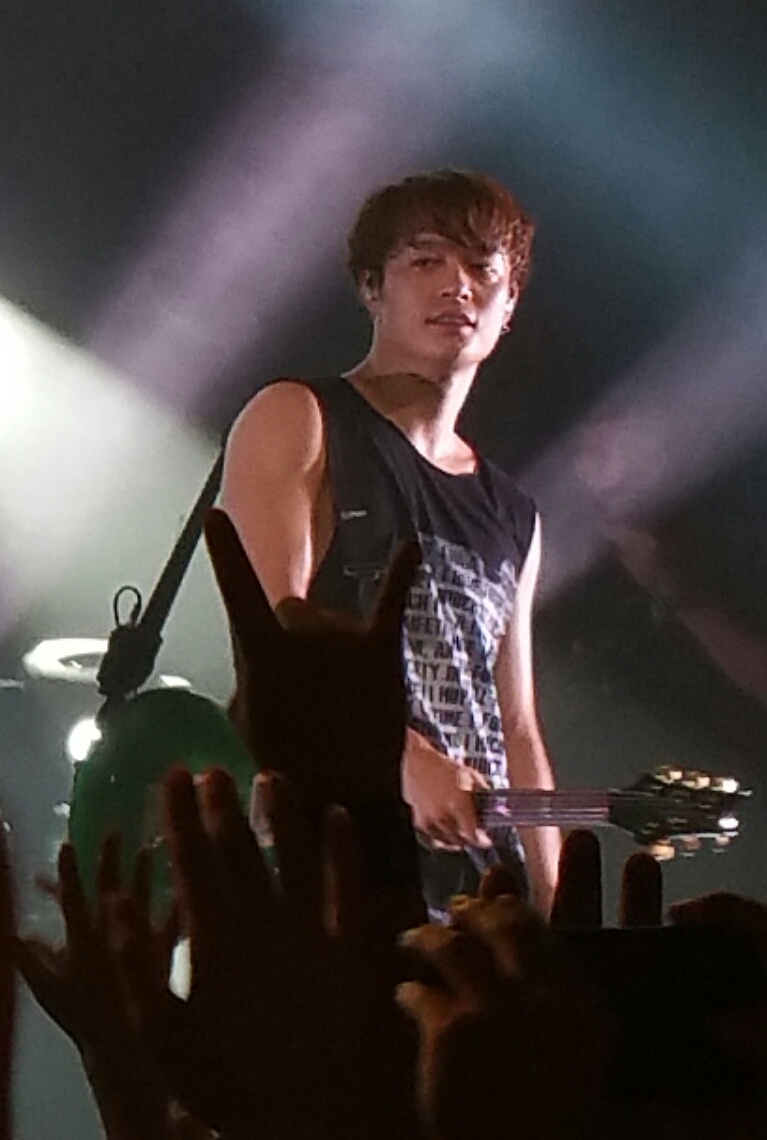
Yamashita performing in 2017

Heads debuted with a single entitled "screeeem!" in July 2000 and followed with "Gooood or Bad!" in November, produced for Amuse, Inc. The group performed every weekend in Osaka's Kyoubashi and Tokyo's Akihabara, shopping and amusement districts.

Heads disbanded in 2002 and in 2003 they took a break to improve their abilities. They merged into a new group with seven other members and were called GROUND 0.

In 2005, Toru took a main role in TV series Shibuya Fifteen. He contributed a cameo as a high school student in Kamen Rider Hibiki. That year, he invited Ryota, their upperclassman Alex and his friend Koyanagi Yuu to form a rock band. Later, Toru become the leader of this band, later named ONE OK ROCK. He met Takahiro Moriuchi when he performed with his previous band and then stalked him until he joined One Ok Rock, after repeated rejections. After Alex quit the band, Yamashita switched from rhythm guitar to lead guitar.

He is heavily influenced by American bands Foo Fighters, The Smashing Pumpkins, Enter Shikari, Linkin Park, Good Charlotte, Sleeping With Sirens, Nirvana, The Used, Avril Lavigne, and Biffy Clyro.

=== Equipment ===
Toru Yamashita uses many guitars from time to time. Toru used Gibson Les Paul guitars in early One Ok Rock live concerts. He started with a Gibson Les Paul Standard Black and then purchased a Les Paul Custom Alpine White in 2009. Four years later, this guitar was signed by the members of Fall Out Boy on the front side and Avril Lavigne on the rear side. Toru has first seen using PRS Guitars during the band's final tour at Nippon Budokan. During the JinseixBoku era, he changed most of his guitar to PRS Guitars and hasn't been seen playing his Gibson Les Paul guitars as often. Recently, he has been using Fender Stratocaster since Eye of the Storm tour.

== Personal life ==
On July 28, 2020, it was announced that Yamashita had been tested positive for COVID-19.

On December 28, 2021 Toru announced on his Instagram that he has married actress and model Aya Omasa.

On January 8, 2025 Toru's wife announced that she is pregnant, minutes later, Toru would confirm the news through Instagram.

== Filmography ==
=== TV series ===
Year	Title	Role	Notes	Ref.
2005	Shibuya Fifteen	Ryuugo	Leading role	
2005	Kamen Rider Hibiki	High school student	Eps. 44–45	

== Collaborations ==
Year	Title	Album	Album artist	Notes
2020	"Inside You"	Eyes	Milet	Toru wrote and produced the songs.
2020	"The Love We've Made"	Eyes	Milet	Toru wrote and produced the songs.
2020	"Somebody"	Eyes	Milet	Toru wrote and produced the songs.
2022	"Who I am"	visions	Milet	Toru wrote and produced the songs.
2022	"On The Edge"	visions	Milet	Toru wrote and produced the songs.
2022	"One Reason"	visions	Milet	Toru wrote and produced the songs.
2022	"Final Call"	5am	Milet	Toru wrote and produced the song.
2022	"lullaby"	Brighter	YU-KA	Toru wrote and produced the songs.
2022	"No Stars"	Brighter	YU-KA	Toru wrote and produced the songs.
2023	"Hoshizukiyo" (星月夜)	Brighter	YU-KA	Toru wrote and produced the songs.
2024	"Sunshade"		YU-KA	Toru wrote and produced the songs.

== Other songs ==
"Sunshade", Laughing Matryoshka (2024) theme song (music composition).

== See also ==
- One Ok Rock discography
