= Ryota Kohama =

Japanese bassist

- 小浜良太
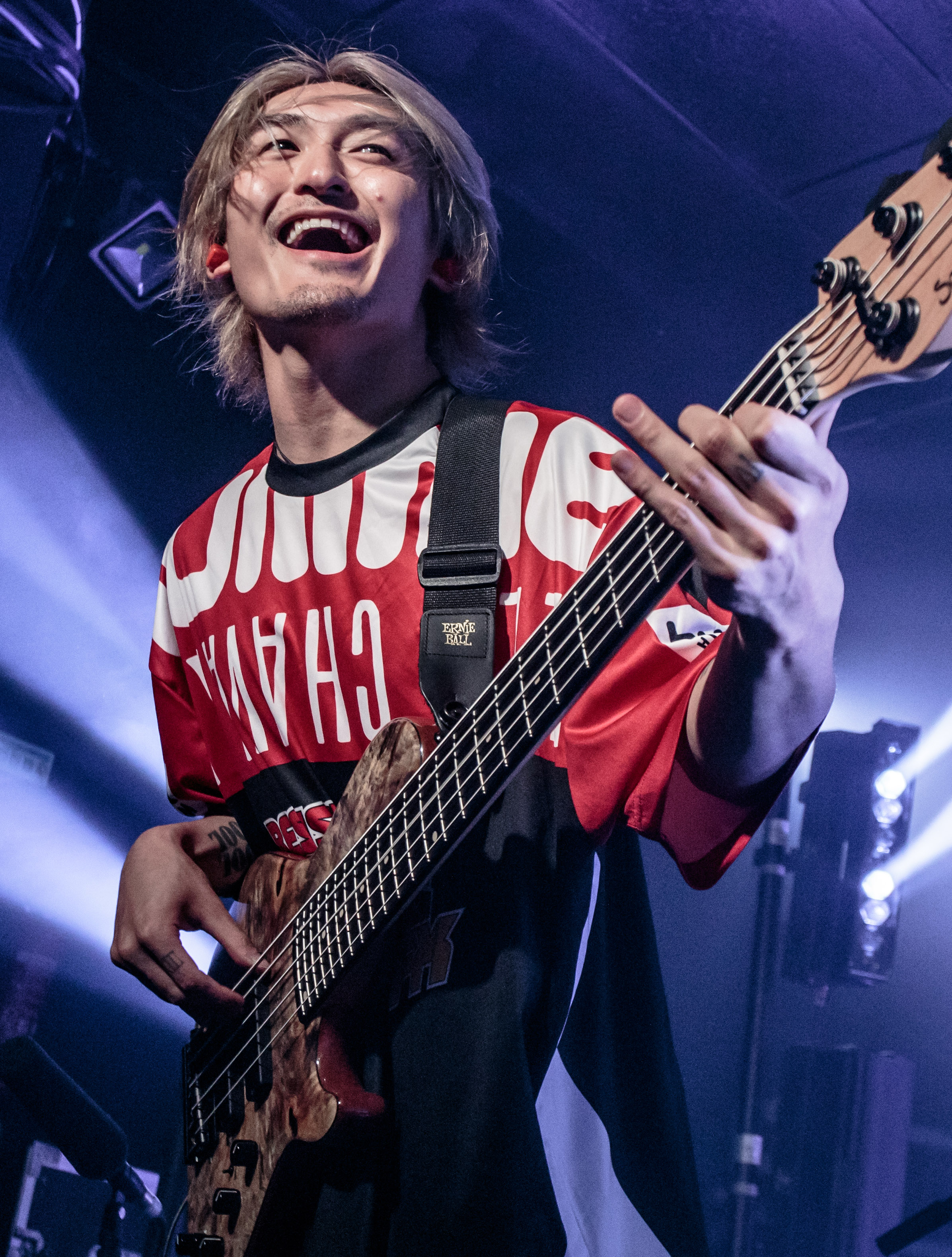
- Ryota in 2019 in Budapest, Dürer Kert
- Born: Kohama Ryota; September 4, 1989 (age 37); Osaka, Japan
- Occupation: Musician
- Spouse: Michelle Lavigne (m. 2017; sep. 2025)
- Children: 1
- Relatives: Avril Lavigne (sister-in-law)
- Musical career
- Genres: Alternative rock; post-hardcore
- Instruments: Bass guitar
- Years active: 2000–present
- Member of: One Ok Rock; Heads
- Website: oneokrock.com

Ryota Kohama (Japanese: 小浜良太, Hepburn: Kohama Ryōta; born 4 September 1989), better known by his stage name Ryota, is a Japanese musician who is best known for being the bassist of the rock band One Ok Rock.

He was in the hip-hop dance group Heads along with Toru Yamashita (guitarist of One Ok Rock) before they disbanded in 2002.

== Early life and career ==
Kohama was born in Osaka before moving to Tokyo. Toru Yamashita, a fellow member from One Ok Rock, is his childhood friend. They formed a hip-hop dance group HEADS when they were fifth and sixth graders with Takuya Uehara and Kohei Nakamura. They were also active before their debut and participated in dance competitions around the years of 1995–1999. They debuted with a single titled "Screeeem!" in July 2000, and it was followed by the second single "Gooood or Bad!" in November, which was produced by a popular musician under the label Amuse, Inc. The dance group made a performance every weekend on the busy streets in Osaka's Kyoubashi and Tokyo's Akihabara, shopping, and amusement districts.

Heads disbanded in 2002 and in 2003 they took a break to improve their abilities. At this point, Heads as a four-member group ended. They merged into a new group with seven other members and were called Ground 0. In 2004, Toru and Ryota continued their activities as Ground 0. In 2005, when Toru tried to explore acting and took a main role in the TV series Shibuya Fifteen, Kohama also played a minor character in the drama.

That same year, he was invited by Toru to form a rock band, alongside their upperclassman Alex and Toru's friend Koyanagi Yuu. In the beginning, Kohama initially had no interest in joining a band or playing bass, until he listened to Red Hot Chili Peppers and was inspired by Flea to play bass. During the early days of One Ok Rock, Kohama only talked to Toru because he felt inferior and didn't talk to vocalist Takahiro Moriuchi for about a year because he was afraid of him. He was the most furious when Alex was caught groping a schoolgirl on a subway and almost quit playing bass to learn to play guitar. Kohama collaborated with drummer Tomoya Kanki and wrote the song "Deeper Deeper".

== Personal life ==
On 18 February 2017, Ryota married Michelle Lavigne, the sister of Canadian singer-songwriter Avril Lavigne. It was rumoured that the couple had gotten married because during an encore at a concert, Taka said "Congrats on marriage, Ryota!" and Kohama replied saying "I registered for marriage this month! Her name is Michelle, please take care of us!" Fans also noticed that Michelle had changed her name to Michelle Kohama on her Instagram account. Kohama later confirmed on Instagram that he and Lavigne were married. In October 2017, he announced the birth of their first child, a daughter. The couple announced their separation at the end of September 2025.

On October 10, 2026, Ryota confirmed reports through his official social media account, that he and actress Saeko Dokyu are in a relationship.

== Equipment ==
Ryota has used many different basses, but he mostly uses Warwick basses. He has three Warwick Streamer LX4 and two Warwick Streamer LX5 with different color. Ryota prefers to play clean, but sometimes he adds distortion to his bassline, such like "Deeper Deeper" and "Rock, Scissor and Paper". He painted his amps with the help of a street artist.

== See also ==
- One Ok Rock discography
