= Jinsei×Boku= =

Studio album by One Ok Rock
- Released: March 6, 2013
- Studio: Victor Studios; Heartbeat Studio; Innig Recording Hostelry; Alive Studio; Foxy Studios
- Genre: Alternative rock; pop-punk; post-hardcore; emo
- Length: 53:50
- Language: English; Japanese
- Label: A-Sketch
- Producer: One Ok Rock; Akkin

One Ok Rock chronology
Zankyo Reference (2011)	Jinsei×Boku= (2013)	35xxxv (2015)

Singles from Jinsei×Boku =
- 1. "The Beginning" Released: August 22, 2012; 2. "The Same As..." Released: December 15, 2012; 3. "Deeper Deeper/Nothing Helps" Released: January 9, 2013; 4. "Clock Strikes" Released: February 26, 2013

Jinsei×Boku= (人生×僕= Jinsei Kakete Boku wa, lit. Life Times Me Equals) is the sixth studio album by the Japanese rock band, One Ok Rock. It was released on March 6, 2013 and reached second place on the Oricon weekly chart. This album brought One Ok Rock to worldwide popularity, especially after the first single, "The Beginning", was selected as official soundtrack in the live action adaptation of Rurouni Kenshin. The song peaked at number 2 on the Billboard Japan Hot 100 and stayed for 45 weeks. The next single, "Deeper Deeper/Nothing Helps", was featured on the DmC: Devil May Cry ("Nothing Helps") game and used for Suzuki Swift TV commercials ("Deeper Deeper").

A DVD special bundled with the album released for limited pre-order only, consists of an acoustic performance in the studio of "The Beginning" and "The Same As...".

The song "The Beginning" can be heard in the 2012 film Rurouni Kenshin. "Clock Strikes" was featured in the PS3/PS4 Sega game Ryū ga Gotoku Ishin!. The song "Be The Light" was used in the animated film Space Pirate Captain Harlock, starring Shun Oguri and Haruma Miura.

== Background and development ==
After their first two nights live in Yokohama Arena, One Ok Rock stated that they "wanted to begin recording a new album." Songs like "The Beginning" and "Clock Strikes", had been made long before Zankyo Reference was released. In mid-2012, they were asked to make a song for a new live adaption of the popular manga Rurouni Kenshin. The single "The Beginning" was used for the live adaption movie.

== Promotion ==
One Ok Rock held their first national arena tour in 2013, engaged more than 100,000 audiences, six cities and 11 days, started from 11 May to 6 June 2013. They recorded 22 songs from their second day in Yokohama Arena released on Blu-ray and DVD, entitled Jinsei×Kimi= (人生×君=) Tour Live&Film, together with a one-hour documentation of the tour.

Later the band conducted their first world tour, consisting of concerts in 11 countries of Asia and Europe from October to December. Additional dates were added for Los Angeles and New York in early 2015. In the spring of 2014, they participated in Vans Warped Tour, successfully reaching new audiences abroad.

== Track listing ==
Jinsei×Boku= – Standard edition
No.	Title	Lyrics	Music	Arrangement	Length
1.	"Introduction〜Where Idiot Should Go〜"	-	Toru Yamashita	Yamashita; Akkin	1:12
2.	"Ending Story??"	Takahiro Moriuchi	Yamashita; Moriuchi	Moriuchi; Yamashita; Ryota Kohama; Tomoya Kanki; Akkin	4:15
3.	"Onion!"	Moriuchi	Moriuchi	Moriuchi; Yamashita; Kohama; Kanki; Akkin	3:18
4.	"The Beginning"	Moriuchi	Moriuchi	Moriuchi; Yamashita; Kohama; Kanki; Akkin	4:55
5.	"Clock Strikes"	Moriuchi	Yamashita; Moriuchi	Moriuchi; Yamashita; Kohama; Kanki; Akkin	3:55
6.	"Be the Light^{[A]}"	Moriuchi	Moriuchi	Moriuchi; Yamashita; Kohama; Kanki; Akkin	5:39
7.	"Nothing Helps"	Moriuchi	Moriuchi; Yamashita; Kohama; Kanki	Moriuchi; Yamashita; Kohama; Kanki; Akkin	4:48
8.	"Juvenile"	Moriuchi	Moriuchi	Moriuchi; Yamashita; Kohama; Kanki; Akkin	3:59
9.	"All Mine"	Moriuchi	Moriuchi	Moriuchi; Yamashita; Kohama; Kanki; Akkin	4:36
10.	"Smiling Down^{[B]}"	Moriuchi	Yamashita; Moriuchi	Moriuchi; Yamashita; Kohama; Kanki; Akkin	4:25
11.	"Deeper Deeper"	Moriuchi	Kanki; Kohama	Moriuchi; Yamashita; Kohama; Kanki; Akkin	3:35
12.	"69^{[C]}"	Moriuchi	Moriuchi; Yamashita; Kohama; Kanki	Moriuchi; Yamashita; Kohama; Kanki; Akkin	4:37
13.	"The Same As..."	Moriuchi	Moriuchi	Moriuchi; Yamashita; Kohama; Kanki; Akkin	4:36
Total length:					53:50

Jinsei×Boku= – First press limited edition (bonus track)
No.	Title	Length
13.	"The Same As..." (With "ワンオクロック劇場" hidden track)	16:15
Total length:		65:27

Jinsei×Boku= – Limited edition (bonus DVD)
No.	Title	Length
14.	"The Beginning" (Studio Jam Session)
15.	"The Same As..." (Studio Jam Session)

Notes

^{A} There are seven kinds of music videos uploaded on the band's Official YouTube including English subtitles, Japanese subtitles, French subtitles, Chinese subtitles, Spanish subtitles, Portuguese subtitles, and no subtitles. The contents are the same in all versions.
^{B} The song was made for their friend, Kei Goto (also known as K), vocalist of Pay Money To My Pain who died in the morning of December 30, 2012 due to acute heart failure.
^{C} Pronounced rokku (ロック, "Rock"), the track's name is an answer to the album title: "Life Times Me Equals Rock". The song title is a goroawase.

== Personnel ==
Credits adapted from the liner notes of Jinsei×Boku=.

One Ok Rock

- Takahiro "Taka" Moriuchi — lead vocals
- Toru Yamashita — guitar
- Ryota Kohama — bass guitar
- Tomoya Kanki — drums

Additional musicians

- Makoto Minagawa — piano (4, 6, 9, 10)
- Kiyohide Ura — piano (13)
- Mio Okamura — 1st violin (2)
- Shohei Yoshida — 2nd violin (2)
- Mikiyo Kikuchi — viola (2)
- Robin Dupuy — cello (2)
- Yoshinobu Takeshita — contrabass (2}
- Ayano Kasahara — cello (9)
- Mari Masumoto — cello (9)

Design

- Kazuaki Seki — art direction
- Daichi Shiono — design

Production

- Akkin — programming (1), strings arrangement (2, 9)
- Kenichi Arai — recording, engineering
- Tomoki Kagami — recording, engineering
- John Feldmann — mixing (1–3, 5, 7, 8, 10–12)
- Tommy English — mixing (1–3, 5, 7, 8, 10–12)
- Tue Madsen — mixing (4, 9, 13)
- Chris Lord-Alge — mixing (6)
- Ryota Hattanda — assistant
- Yusuke Watanabe — assistant
- Yuji Nakamura — assistant
- Kimihiro Nakase — assistant
- Naoki Iwata — assistant
- Ted Jensen — mastering
- Kazutaka Minemori — guitar and bass technician
- Yoshiro "Masuo" Arimatsu — drum technician
- Jamil — English translations

== Charts ==
=== Weekly charts ===
Weekly chart performance for Jinsei×Boku=
Chart (2013)	Peak positions
Japanese Albums (Oricon)	2
Japanese Albums (Billboard Japan)	2

=== Year-end charts ===
Yearly chart performance for Jinsei×Boku=
Chart (2013)	Peak positions
Japanese Albums (Oricon)	24
Japanese Albums (Billboard Japan)	19

=== Singles ===
Title	Year	Peak positions	
Title	Year	JPN Oricon	JPN Billboard
"The Beginning"	2012	5	2
"The Same As..."	2012	—	52
"Deeper Deeper/Nothing Helps"	2013	2	3
"Clock Strikes"	2013	—	27

== Certifications ==
Certifications and sales for Jinsei×Boku=
Region	Certification	Certified units/sales
Japan (RIAJ)	Platinum	250,000^{^}
^{^} Shipments figures based on certification alone.

== Accolades ==
Awards and nominations for Jinsei×Boku=
Award ceremony	Year	Category	Result	Ref.
CD Shop Awards	2014	Finalist Award	Won	
