= Magical Girl Raising Project (disambiguation) =

Magical Girl Raising Project is a Japanese light novel series started in 2012.

Other works in the Magical Girl Raising Project franchise include:

- Magical Girl Raising Project (TV series), a 2016 animated series
- Magical Girl Raising Project: Restart, a 2026 animated series
