= Yuuri (singer-songwriter) =

Japanese singer

Yuuri 優里
- Born: March 23, 1994 (age 32); Makuhari, Chiba Prefecture, Japan
- Genres: J-pop; pop rock
- Occupation: Singer-songwriter
- Instruments: Vocals; guitar
- Years active: 2019–present
- Label: Ariola Japan
- Website: www.yuuriweb.com

Yuuri (優里; born March 23, 1994) is a Japanese singer-songwriter. He is currently signed under the record label Ariola Japan. He is also a YouTuber and owns the channel "Yuuri Channel".

== Career ==
He began his singing career as a vocalist for the four-man rock band, The Bugzy, until they disbanded in May 2019. After the group's disbandment, he began performing live on the streets of Tokyo. On October 10, 2019, Yuuri was singing [「花 」-0714-] by My First Story on the street at the scrambled intersection in Shibuya. It became a hot topic when My First Story vocalist Hiro, jumped in and sang the second verse of the song with him. After this incident, Yuuri was called out from the crowd to perform spontaneously for the encore final performance on November 30 when My First Story was holding a concert in Saitama Super Arena as a part of their country-wide tour "My First Story Tour 2019". Yuuri's originally composed "Kakurenbo" whose recording was supervised by Hiro and My First Story's [「花」 -0714-] were performed together. On December 1, Yuuri released "Kakurenbo" independently. It ranked in 4th place on the general chart on iTunes Japan, and the music video garnered over 40 million views. On the same day, MY FIRST STORY'S version of "Kakurenbo" was also released.

On February 28, 2020, he released his second independent song, titled "Kagome", which later topped the USEN indies chart on March 18. He made his official debut with Sony Music on August 9 with his single "Peter Pan". On October 25, his second major single, "Dry Flower" was released.

On February 1, 2021 "Dry Flower" exceeded over 100 million streams on the Streaming Songs chart on Billboard Japan. He achieved this number after charting for 13 weeks, becoming the first solo male artist to achieve this, and overall third artist to achieve this following LiSA's "Homura" which broke the record after 7 weeks of charting, and BTS' "Dynamite", which took 11 weeks. On March 22, 2021, "Kakurenbo" also exceeded over 100 million streams on Billboard Japan’s Streaming Songs chart. It is the first time in Billboard Japan history for an artist to have two songs exceed 100 million streams only 8 months after their major debut.

On September 1, 2021, "Dry Flower" exceeded 400 million streams on Billboard Japan's Streaming Songs chart. Since it exceeded 400 million streams within 44 weeks of charting, Yuuri became the first and fastest solo male artist to achieve this record, and the second artist overall following BTS’ "Dynamite". He also became the first Japanese artist and solo male artist to exceed 500 million streams on December 22, 2021.

His first studio album Ichi was released on January 12, 2022. He also released his first non-Japanese single, the English version of "Dry Flower" called "Dried Flowers" on January 31, 2022.

== Personal life ==
When Yuuri was in elementary school, he was influenced by his mother who listened to Western rock music, so he often listened to artists such as Bon Jovi, Queen, and AC/DC. Bon Jovi inspired him to become a singer and pursue music as a career. When he entered high school, he started listening to Japanese artists such as Bump of Chicken and Spitz. He started his YouTube channel in March 2020. Since its inception, the channel has gained over 2.5 million subscribers.

== Discography ==
=== Studio albums ===
List of studio albums, with selected details, chart positions, sales, and certifications
Title	Details	Peak chart positions			Sales	Certifications
Title	Details	JPN	JPN Comb	JPN Hot	Sales	Certifications
Ichi	Released: January 12, 2022; Label: Ariola Japan; Formats: CD, digital download, streaming	4	2	3		RIAJ: Gold (phy.)
Ni	Released: March 29, 2023; Label: Ariola Japan; Formats: CD, digital download, streaming	2	1	1	JPN: 25,741	
Poem – 80's	Released: October 4, 2023; Label: Ariola Japan; Formats: CD, digital download, streaming	7	8	9	JPN: 7,511	
Hibiku	Released: November 29, 2023; Label: Ariola Japan; Formats: CD, digital download, streaming	10	11	10	JPN: 6,709	

=== Singles ===
==== As lead artist ====
List of singles as lead artist, showing year released, selected chart positions, certifications, and album name
Title	Year	Peak chart positions					Certifications	Album
Title	Year	JPN	JPN Comb	JPN Hot	KOR	WW	Certifications	Album
"Kakurenbo" (かくれんぼ)	2019	—	30	25	—	—	RIAJ: 3× Platinum (st.)	Ichi
"Kagome" (かごめ)	2020	—	—	—	—	—	RIAJ: Gold (st.)	Ichi
"Peter Pan" (ピーターパン)	2020	—	32	39	—	—	RIAJ: 3× Platinum (st.)	Ichi
"Dry Flower" (ドライフラワー)	2020	—	2	2	—	48	RIAJ: 2× Platinum (dig.); 2× Diamond (st.)	Ichi
"Infinity" (インフィニティ)	2021	20	—	37	—	—	RIAJ: Platinum (st.)	Ichi
"Sakurabare" (桜晴)	2021	—	—	66	—	—	RIAJ: Platinum (st.)	Ichi
"Hikōsen" (飛行船)	2021	—	—	46	—	—	RIAJ: Gold (st.)	Ichi
"Shutter" (シャッター)	2021	—	17	17	—	—	RIAJ: 3× Platinum (st.)	Ichi
"Natsune" (夏音)	2021	—	24	23	—	—	RIAJ: Platinum (st.)	Ichi
"Betelgeuse" (ベテルギウス)	2021	—	3	2	101	116	RIAJ: Platinum (dig.); Diamond (st.)	Ichi
"Wo" (うぉ)	2022	—	—	54	—	—		Ni
"Time Machine" (タイムマシン)	2022	—	—	65	—	—	RIAJ: Gold (st.)	Ni
"Tag" (おにごっこ)	2022	—	41	34	—	—		Ni
"Christmas Eve" (クリスマスイブ)	2022	—	16	17	—	—	RIAJ: Gold (st.)	Ni
"Merry-Go-Round" (メリーゴーランド)	2022	—	48	37	—	—	RIAJ: Gold (st.)	Ni
"The Day We Become Eternal Love, Not Lovers" (恋人じゃなくなった日)	2023	—	43	38	—	—	RIAJ: Platinum (st.)	Ni
"Billimillion" (ビリミリオン)	2023	—	8	6	—	—	RIAJ: 3× Platinum (st.)	Ni
"Curtain Call" (カーテンコール)	2024	15	12	18	—	—	RIAJ: Platinum (st.)	TBA
"Dina"	2025	—	—	—	—	—		TBA
"Strongest" (最&強)	2025	—	—	—	—	—		TBA
"Reincarnation" (輪廻転生)	2025	—	—	—	—	—		TBA
"Song to My Awful You" (最低な君に贈る歌)	2025	—	—	73	—	—		TBA
"The World Has Ended" (世界が終わりました)	2026	—	—	47	—	—		TBA
"Thunderbolt" (サンダーボルト)	2026	21	—	—	—	—		TBA
"—" denotes releases that did not chart.

==== As featured artist ====
List of singles as featured artist, showing year released and album name
Title	Year	Album
"Till I" (SawanoHiroyuki[nZk:Yuuri)	2021	IV
"Bremen" (BAK featuring Yuuri)	2023	Non-album single

==== Other charted songs ====
List of other charted songs, showing year released, selected chart positions, certifications, and album name
Title	Year	Peak chart positions		Certifications	Album
Title	Year	JPN Comb	JPN Hot	Certifications	Album
"Mizukiri" (ミズキリ)	2022	42	53	RIAJ: Gold (st.)	Ichi
"Leo" (レオ)	2022	10	12	RIAJ: Gold (dig.); 3× Platinum (st.)	Ichi

=== Productions ===
- April 30, 2021 – Jun Miyasaka "Shutter": Lyrics and composition by Yuuri.
- December 24, 2021 – Junta "Waraeyo": Lyrics co-written by Yuuri and CHIMERAZ. Composition by Yuuri.
- March 23, 2022 – BAK "Time Machine": Lyrics and composition by Yuuri.
- April 20, 2022 – Little Glee Monster 「心に空を」(The sky inside my heart)
- April 28, 2022 – Ai Tomioka "Rapunzel": Lyrics and composition by Yuuri.
- May 26, 2022 – Maruri "Sukidayo": Lyrics and composition by Yuuri.
- August 24, 2022 – Hey! Say! JUMP "Bitter Chocolate": Lyrics and composition by Yuuri.
- September 20, 2022 – Banbanzai "Yoihanabi": Lyrics and composition by Yuuri.
- November 4, 2022 – Uru "Sobaniiruyo": Lyrics and composition by Yuuri.
- November 10, 2022 – Gen Inoue "My Thoughts On Happiness": Lyrics co-written by GEN INOUE, Yuuri and BAK. Composition by Yuuri and CHIMERAZ.
- February 28, 2023 – Yuuri Channel Editorial Staff (Ryota) "Duplicate Key": Lyrics and composition by Yuuri.
- July 1, 2023 – Tomorrow X Together (TXT) "Hydrangea Love": Producer, Lyrics and composition by Yuuri.
- September 17, 2023 – Zarame "+1": Lyrics and composition by Yuuri and CHIMERAZ.
- October 22, 2023 – Banbanzai "Kinokotakenokoronsou": Lyrics and composition by Yuuri and BAK.
- December 21, 2023 – Banbanzai "Ainouta": Lyrics and composition by Yuuri and BAK.
- January 27, 2024 – Mikuru Asakura "Freedom": Lyrics and composition by Yuuri.

== Appearances ==
=== Radio ===
- October 7, 2020 – Midnight Kakurenbo on FM Yokohama.

=== The First Take ===
- Premiered July 10, 2020 – "Kakurenbo" The Home Take
- Premiered October 30, 2020 – "Dry Flower" The First Take
- Premiered October 1, 2021 – "Shutter" The First Take
- Premiered October 13, 2021 – "Betelgeuse" The First Take
- Premiered August 19, 2022 – "Leo" The First Take
- Premiered August 31, 2022 – "Tag" The First Take
- Premiered December 20, 2024 – "Billimillion" The First Take
- Premiered January 3, 2025 – "DiNA" The First Take

== Music videos ==
List of music videos, showing year released and directors
Title	Year	Director(s)
"Kakurenbo"	2019	Elizabeth Miyaji
"Kagome"	2020	Elizabeth Miyaji
"Peter Pan"	2020	Ichiro Yatsui
"Dry Flower"	2020	Elizabeth Miyaji
"Hikousen"	2021	Kentaro Shima
"Betelgeuse"	2021	Misato Kato
"Leo"	2022	Mai Sakai
"Shutter"	2022	Santa Yamagishi
"Wo"	2022	Daiki Kamoshita

== Awards and nominations ==
Name of the award ceremony, year presented, category, nominee(s) of the award, and the result of the nomination
Award ceremony	Year	Category	Nominee(s)/work(s)	Result	Ref.
Billboard Japan Music Awards	2021	Hot 100 of the Year	"Dry Flower"	Won	
Crunchyroll Anime Awards	2022	Best Ending Sequence	"Infinity" (from anime SK8 the Infinity)	Nominated	
Japan Gold Disc Awards	2022	New Artist of the Year	Yuuri	Won	
JASRAC Awards	2021	Bronze Award	Yuuri	Won	
MTV Video Music Awards Japan	2021	Song of the Year	Yuuri	Won	
