= Deeper Deeper/Nothing Helps =

Single by One Ok Rock

from the album Jinsei×Boku=
- Released: January 9, 2013
- Length: 12:44
- Label: A-Sketch; Amuse, Inc.
- Songwriter: Takahiro Moriuchi
- Producer: One Ok Rock

One Ok Rock singles chronology
"The Beginning" (2012)	"Deeper Deeper/Nothing Helps" (2013)	"Mighty Long Fall/Decision" (2014)

Audio sample
- "Deeper Deeper": file; help

Music video
- "Deeper Deeper" on YouTube

"Deeper Deeper/Nothing Helps" is the eighth single by Japanese rock band ONE OK ROCK. It was released on January 9, 2013, under A-Sketch label. It peaked at #3 on Billboard Japan Hot 100. The single also charted at second place on the Oricon charts and stayed for nine weeks.

"Deeper Deeper" was featured in Suzuki Swift Sport commercial in Japan, while "Nothing Helps" was used in the Japanese version of the PS3/Xbox 360 video game DmC: Devil May Cry.

== Composition and lyrics ==
"Deeper Deeper" is a fast tempo song, composed by drummer Tomoya alongside bassist Ryota and mixed by John Feldmann. It starts with loud bass and drum beats as vocalist Taka's throat-clear and screams amplify the intro. The song's lyrics were written by Taka and invites listeners to keep pushing life by exploring something new, because being trapped in comfort and silence will only make life feel less meaningful.

The second track "Nothing Helps" written in all English lyrics. It was composed by the band and the lyrics written by Taka, dedicate to fans, contains a message that can be taken as the belief and determination to "keep moving forward" through their musical activities.

The last track "Kasabuta" was composed and written by Taka, a powerful ballad depicts the wounds received in the past and the feeling of emptiness that cannot be wiped off. The lyrics were written mostly in Japanese with only four words in English.

== Music video ==
The music video for "Deeper Deeper" was released on January 7, 2013, two days before the single was released. Directed by Takahide Ishii, it features the band playing in an abandoned prison. At the same location, a child is followed by a mysterious floating iron ball. After being followed for a long time, the child finally meets the boss, then faces and defeats it. At the end of the video, the child meets someone who resembles him.

== Track listing ==
All songs were written by Taka.

No.	Title	Music	Length
1.	"Deeper Deeper"	Ryota; Tomoya	3:35
2.	"Nothing Helps"	Taka; Toru; Ryota; Tomoya	4:48
3.	"Kasabuta" (カサブタ)	Taka	4:22
Total length:			12:44

== Personnel ==
One Ok Rock

- Takahiro "Taka" Moriuchi — lead vocals
- Toru Yamashita — lead guitar, rhythm guitar
- Ryota Kohama — bass guitar
- Tomoya Kanki — drums, percussion

Production

- Akkin — arranger
- Kenichi Arai — engineering
- Takashi Kagami — engineering
- John Feldmann — mixing (tracks 1–2)
- Kazutaka Minemori — bass technician
- Yoshiro "Masuo" Arimatsu — drum technician, guitar

== Charts ==
=== Single ===
Chart (2013)	Peak position
Japanese Weekly Singles (Oricon)	2

=== Songs ===
Title	Year	Peak positions
Title	Year	JPN Billboard
"Deeper Deeper"	2013	3
"Nothing Helps"	2013	82
