= Masako Mori (singer) =

Japanese idol, enka singer, and actress (born 1958)

Masako Mori 森 昌子
- Born: Masako Morita (森田 昌子); October 13, 1958 (age 68)
- Origin: Utsunomiya, Tochigi Prefecture, Japan
- Genres: Enka; kayōkyoku
- Occupations: Idol singer; enka singer; actress
- Years active: 1972–1986, 2006–2019
- Labels: Tokuma Ongaku Kōgyō (1972–1979); Pony Canyon (1979–2008); Ongaku Kōbō (2009–2011); King Records (2012–present)
- Spouse: Shinichi Mori (m. 1986; div. 2005)
- Relatives: Takahiro Moriuchi; Tomohiro Moriuchi; Hiroki Moriuchi; Maika Yamamoto (daughter-in-law)

Masako Mori (森 昌子, born; Masako Morita; born October 13, 1958) is a Japanese idol, enka singer, and actress.

== Career ==
She debuted in 1972, at age 13, with the song "Sensei" (Professor), receiving numerous music awards for it. The song reached the #3 position on the Oricon charts. Other hits include "Dōkyūsei" (Classmates), "Chugaku Sannensei" (Junior High School Third Grade), "Okaasan" (Mother) and "Ettou Tsubame" (The Wintering Swallow).

In 1973, she was part of "a hit female trio", which also included musicians Momoe Yamaguchi and Junko Sakurada. The music trio became popular as part of the television program Producing the Stars (Star Tanjō!); they were known as "The Trio of Third-Year Junior High School Students" ("Hana no Chu 3 Trio").

She won the Best Singer prize for "Ettou Tsubame" (越冬つばめ) at the 25th Japan Record Awards. She retired when she married Shinichi Mori in 1986, but in 2006 returned to the stage with the single "Bara Iro no Mirai". The song reached the #14 position on the Oricon charts.

In addition to being a singer, she has acted in a number of Japanese movies and TV dramas.

Masako Mori has performed a total of 15 times at Kōhaku Uta Gassen.

In March 2019, Masako Mori announced that she was retiring from showbusiness again.

== Private life ==
She married fellow singer Shinichi Mori in 1986, they had three sons together, ONE OK ROCK vocalist Takahiro Moriuchi, Tomohiro (who works at TV Tokyo) and MY FIRST STORY vocalist Hiroki Moriuchi. The couple divorced in 2005. Through her third son, actress and model Maika Yamamoto is her daughter-in-law.

== Discography ==
=== Biggest hits ===
#	Title	Date/Position	Sales
1	Sensei (せんせい); Debut single and signature song	72-07-01 (#3)	541,000
2	Dōkyūsei (同級生)	72-10-05 (#4)	367,000
3	Chūgaku Sannensei (中学三年生)	73-02-05 (#3)	329,000
4	Yūgao No Ame (夕顔の雨)	73-05-05 (#7)	202,000
5	Shirakaba Nikki (白樺日記)	73-08-25 (#11)	166,000
6	Kinenjyu (記念樹)	73-10-30 (#13)	136,000
7	Shitamachi No Aoi Sora (下町の青い空)	74-04-20 (#15)	119,000
8	Kyō Mo Egao De Konnichiwa (今日も笑顔でこんにちは)	74-07-01 (#12)	129,000
9	Okaasan (おかあさん)	74-09-01 (#21)	104,000
10	Haru No Mezame (春のめざめ)	75-03-01 (#20)	101,000
11	Omokage No Kimi (面影の君)	75-06-01 (#15)	137,000
12	Anata Wo Matte Sannenmitsuki (あなたを待って三年三月)	75-04-01 (#15)	149,000
13	Ano Hito Fune Itchatta (あの人の船行っちゃった)	75-12-01 (#22)	101,000
14	Yūbue No Oka (夕笛の丘)	76-03-01 (#18)	99,000
15	Namida No Sanbashi (なみだの桟橋)	77-07-25 (#28)	97,000
16	Tameiki Bashi (ためいき橋)	79-10-21 (#28)	82,000
17	Kanashimi Honsen Nihonkai (哀しみ本線日本海)	81-07-10 (#36)	143,000
18	Ettou Tsubame (越冬つばめ)	83-08-21 (#27)	111,000
19	Bara Iro No Mirai (バラ色の未来)	06-06-07 (#14)	22,000
