= Shinichi Mori =

Japanese male enka singer and composer (born 1947)

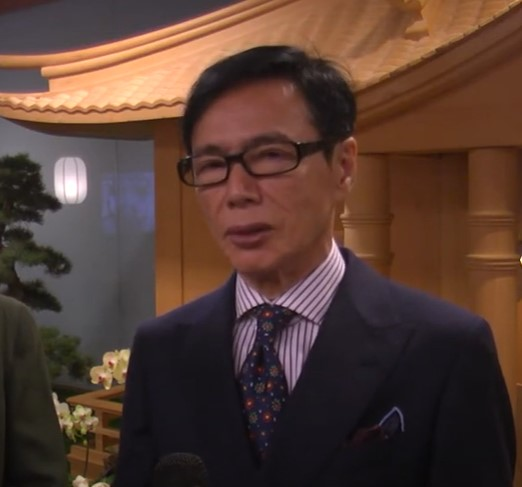
- Born: Kazuhiro Moriuchi; November 18, 1947 (age 78); Kofu, Yamanashi, Japan
- Occupations: Singer; composer
- Years active: 1966–present
- Spouses: Reiko Ohara (m. 1980; div. 1984); Masako Mori (m. 1986; div. 2005)
- Children: Takahiro Moriuchi; Tomohiro Moriuchi; Hiroki Moriuchi
- Relatives: Maika Yamamoto (daughter-in-law)
- Musical career
- Genres: Enka; Kayōkyoku; Folk; Pop
- Instrument: Vocals
- Label: Victor Entertainment
- Website: www.jvcmusic.co.jp/mori

Kazuhiro Moriuchi (森内 一寛; born November 18, 1947, in Kofu, Yamanashi) known professionally as Shinichi Mori (森 進一, Mori Shin'ichi) is a Japanese male enka singer and composer, who also sings folk and pop music. He has sold more than 90 million records, making him one of the best selling Japanese musicians.

Mori has been married and divorced twice, first to Reiko Ohara and then to Masako Mori. His sons, Takahiro Moriuchi and Hiroki Moriuchi, are the vocalists of the rock bands One Ok Rock and My First Story, respectively.

== Career ==
In the beginning, Mori won a competition at Fuji Television Network in 1965. He debuted with the successful song "Onna no Tameiki" of the famous composer Inomata Kōshō in 1966.

His debut at Kōhaku Uta Gassen was in 1968, singing "Hana To Chō". His 1974 Japan Record Award-winning song "Erimo Misaki" (襟裳岬) was composed by Takuro Yoshida. His 1982 song "Fuyu no Riviera" (冬のリヴィエラ) was composed by Eiichi Ohtaki, former member of Happy End. His song "Ofukuro san" (おふくろさん) was covered by Sharam Q in their 1997 album Sharam Q no Enka no Hanamichi (シャ乱Qの演歌の花道). His 2003 song "Ōkami Tachi no Tōboe" (狼たちの遠吠え) was written and composed by Tsuyoshi Nagabuchi. His 2004 song "Saraba Seishun no Kageyo" (さらば青春の影よ) was written by Izumi Sakai.

In 2007, his musical godfather Kōhan Kawauchi became his enemy, because Mori added other lyrics into the original lyrics of "Ofukuro San" at the 57th NHK Kōhaku Uta Gassen. Shinichi's long career as an enka singer is well-known and he has had many appearances in Kōhaku Uta Gassen.

In October 2008, his single "Hatoba" debuted at number 27 on Japan's Oricon charts. The song was composed by himself. With the song "Hatoba", he became the first artist to have one hundred Top 100 singles in Japan's Oricon charts history.

== Discography ==
- "Onna no Tameiki" (女のためいき, Woman's Sigh) : 1966
- "Hana to Chō" (花と蝶, Flower and Butterfly) : 1968
- "Minatomachi Blues" (港町ブルース, Port Town Blues) : 1969
- "Hana to Namida" (花と涙, Flower and Tear) : 1969
- "Ginza no Onna" (銀座の女, Woman in Ginza) : 1970
- "Ofukuro san" (おふくろさん, My dear Mother) : 1971
- "Fuyu no Tabi" (冬の旅, Winter Trip) : 1973
- "Erimo Misaki" (襟裳岬, Cape Erimo) : 1974
- "Wakare no Seppun" (別れの接吻, Farewell Kiss) : 1975
- "Sazanka" (さざんか, Sasanqua) : 1976
- "Tokyo Monogatari" (東京物語, Tokyo Story) : 1977
- "Shinjuku Minatomachi" (新宿・みなと町, Shinjuku, Port Town) : 1979
- "Sakaba Bune" (酒場舟, Boozerie Ship) : 1980
- "Fuyu no Riviera" (冬のリヴィエラ, Winter Riviera) : 1982
- "Kita no Hotaru" (北の螢, North Firefly) : 1984
- "Yūsuge no Koi" (ゆうすげの恋, Love of Daily Lily) : 1986
- "Kanashii Keredo" (悲しいけれど, Although I am sad) : 1987
- "Usagi" (うさぎ, Rabbit) : 1989
- "Kaze no Elegy" (風のエレジー, Wind Elegy) : 1990
- "Nakase Ame" (泣かせ雨, Rain Making Me Cry) : 1991
- "Warui Hito" (わるいひと, Bad Person) : 1993
- "Usotsuki" (うそつき, Liar) : 1994
- "Kanashimi no Utsuwa" (悲しみの器, Receptacle of Sadness) : 1996
- "Onna Gokoro" (女心, Woman's Heart) : 1998
- "Uragiri" (裏切り, Betrayal) : 1999
- "Shūressha" (終列車, Final Train) : 2000
- "Ame no Kūkō" (雨の空港, Rainy Airport) : 2001
- "Sepia no Ame" (セピアの雨, Sepia Rain) : 2002
- "Unga" (運河, Canal) : 2002
- "Ōkami Tachi no Tōboe" (狼たちの遠吠え, Wolves' Howl) : 2003
- "Saraba Seishun no Kageyo" (さらば青春の影よ, Good-bye, Shadow of Adolescence) : 2004
- "Hana" (はな, Flower) : 2005
- "Tazunete Otaru" (たずねて小樽, Visiting Otaru) : 2006
- "Jinsei Hitasura" (人生ひたすら, Single-minded Life) : 2007
- "Onna no Koi" (女の恋, Woman's Love) : 2008
- "Hatoba" (波止場, Dockside) : 2008
- "Yuragi" (ゆらぎ, Flicker) : 2009

== Kohaku Uta Gassen ==
Year/Number	#	Song	#/total	Opponent	Others
1968/19th Kohaku Uta Gassen	1	Hana To Chō	22/23	Jun Mayuzumi	Penultimate(1)
1969/20th Kohaku Uta Gassen	2	Minato Machi Blues	23/23	Hibari Misora	Finalista(1)
1970/21st Kohaku Uta Gassen	3	Ginza no Onna	24/24	Hibari Misora(2)	Finalista(2)
1971/22nd Kohaku Uta Gassen	4	Ofukuro San	25/25	Hibari Misora(3)	Finalista(3)
1972/23rd Kohaku Uta Gassen	5	Sasurai Bune	01/23	Mari Amachi	First singer(1)
1973/24th Kohaku Uta Gassen	6	Fuyu no Tabi	18/22	Mina Aoe	
1974/25th Kohaku Uta Gassen	7	Erimo Misaki	25/25	Chiyoko Shimakura	Finalista (of all singers)(4)
1975/26th Kohaku Uta Gassen	8	Ah Hito Koishi	18/24	Rumiko Koyanagi	
1976/27th Kohaku Uta Gassen	9	Sazanka	19/24	Aki Yashiro(1)	
1977/28th Kohaku Uta Gassen	10	Tokyo Monogatari	23/24	Harumi Miyako(1)	Penultimate(2)
1978/29th Kohaku Uta Gassen	11	Kimiyo Koyae	23/24	Harumi Miyako(2)	Penultimate(3)
1979/30th Kohaku Uta Gassen	12	Shinjuku Minatomachi	20/23	Masako Mori(1)	
1980/31st Kohaku Uta Gassen	13	Koidukiyo	22/23	Sachiko Kobayashi(1)	Penultimate(4)
1981/32nd Kohaku Uta Gassen	14	Inochi Ataete	20/22	Harumi Miyako(3)	
1982/33rd Kohaku Uta Gassen	15	Kagewo Shitaite	22/22	Harumi Miyako(4)	Finalista (of all singers)(5)
1983/34th Kohaku Uta Gassen	16	Fuyu no Riviera	20/21	Sachiko Kobayashi(2)	Penultimate(5)
1984/35th Kohaku Uta Gassen	17	Kita no Hotaru	20/20	Harumi Miyako(5)	Finalista(6)
1985/36th Kohaku Uta Gassen	18	Onna Moyou	20/20	Masako Mori(3)	Finalista (of all singers)(7)
1986/37th Kohaku Uta Gassen	19	Yuusuge no Koi	20/20	Sayuri Ishikawa(1)	Finalista (of all singers)(8)
1987/38th Kohaku Uta Gassen	20	Kanashii Keredo...	01/20	Aki Yashiro(2)	First singer(2)
1988/39th Kohaku Uta Gassen	21	Kyoto Satigatashi	18/21	Naomi Chiaki	
1989/40th Kohaku Uta Gassen	22	Yubiwa	18/20	Sachiko Kobayashi(3)	
1990/41st Kohaku Uta Gassen	23	Ofukuro San (2)	29/29	Harumi Miyako(6)	Finalista (of all singers)(9)
1991/42nd Kohaku Uta Gassen	24	Nakase Ame	25/28	Kye Eun Sook	
1992/43rd Kohaku Uta Gassen	25	Gekijo no Mae	23/28	Miyako Otsuki	
1993/44th Kohaku Uta Gassen	26	Saraba Tomo yo	25/26	Harumi Miyako(7)	Penultimate(6)
1994/45th Kohaku Uta Gassen	27	Ofukuro San (3)	21/25	Saori Yuki and Shoko Yasuda(1)	
1995/46th Kohaku Uta Gassen	28	Kanashimi no Utsuwa	24/25	Harumi Miyako(8)	Penultimate(7)
1996/47th Kohaku Uta Gassen	29	Yoru no Shijima	10/25	Harumi Miyako(9)	Finalista in the first half(1)
1997/48th Kohaku Uta Gassen	30	Erimo Misaki (2)	23/25	Sayuri Ishikawa(2)	
1998/49th Kohaku Uta Gassen	31	Fuyu no Tabi (2)	22/25	Ayako Fuji	
1999/50th Kohaku Uta Gassen	32	Ofukuro San (4)	24/27	Saori Yuki and Shoko Yasuda(2)	
2000/51st Kohaku Uta Gassen	33	Shū Ressha	22/28	Miyuki Kawanaka	
2001/52nd Kohaku Uta Gassen	34	Sore wa Koi	20/27	Fuyumi Sakamoto	
2002/53rd Kohaku Uta Gassen	35	Unga	13/27	Mitsuko Nakamura	Finalista in the first half(2)
2003/54th Kohaku Uta Gassen	36	Ōkami tachi no Tōboe	15/30	Namie Amuro	Finalist in the first half(3)
2004/55th Kohaku Uta Gassen	37	Saraba Seishun no Kage yo	24/28	Mai Kuraki	
2005/56th Kohaku Uta Gassen	38	Ofukuro San (5)	23/29	Ai	
2006/57th Kohaku Uta Gassen	39	Ofukuro San (6)	13/27	Sayuri Ishikawa(3)	Finalist in the first half(4)
2007/58th Kohaku Uta Gassen	40	Kita no Hotaru (2)	26/27	Akiko Wada	Penultimate(8)
2008/59th Kohaku Uta Gassen	41	Ofukuro San (7)	25/26	Yoshimi Tendo	Penultimate(9)
2009/60th Kohaku Uta Gassen	42	Hana To Chō(2)	11/25	Miyuki Kawanaka(2)	Finalist in the first half(5)
2010/61st Kohaku Uta Gassen	43	Erimo Misaki (3)	12/22	Yoshimi Tendo(2)	Finalist in the first half(6)
2011/62nd Kohaku Uta Gassen	44	Minato Machi Blues (2)	10/25	Ringo Shiina(3)	Finalist in the first half(7)
2012/63rd Kohaku Uta Gassen	45	Fuyu no Riviera (2)	11/25	Ayaka Iida	Finalist in the first half(8)

== Honours ==
- Order of the Rising Sun, 4th Class, Gold Rays with Rosette (2021)

== See also ==
- List of best-selling music artists
- List of best-selling music artists in Japan
