= Air Swell (band) =

Japanese rock band

AIR SWELL
- Origin: Shikoku, Japan
- Genres: Alternative rock; post-hardcore
- Years active: 2006–present
- Label: Innovator Records
- Members: Hamaken; Hiromitsu; Yudai
- Past members: Taisuke
- Website: http://air-swell.net/

Air Swell (stylized as AIR SWELL) is a 3-piece Japanese rock band hailing from Shikoku but currently based in Tokyo. They describe their style as a mix of alternative, industrial, britpop, emo, grunge, punk and heavy rock resulting in a multi-layered-instruments-and-vocals rock sound.

== History ==
At the heart of AIR SWELL is singer/guitarist Hamaken who is not only the band's composer, lyricist and music arranger but is also a concert promoter / event organizer of his own Kuroshio Drive. They started with two self-produced mini albums in 2010 your fairytale is neverending (released on 21 Feb 2010) and ツナガルキズナ (released on 20 August 2010).

Currently, their music is distributed by JMS (Japan Music System) which is a music distribution company handling mainly indie artists in Japan.

Their first album under a record label (INNOVATOR Records) is RIMFIRE (released on 2 August 2012) and their first album to be distributed by JMS. Hamaken showed a wide range of songwriting and music arranging with a variety of songs from their signature multi layered rock sound such as the song "FAST LANE" to the pop rock バッドボーイズセレナーデ ("Bad Boys Serenade"). RIMFIRE also features singer Hiro from the band My First Story in the song "JAP POPPER". The two bands met through the small clubs and Livehouses circuit and Hamaken invited Hiro to be a guest singer in the song, saying he liked Hiro's voice.

They then released a mini album THE ART OF PSYCHO on 5 June 2013 with the 1st track "I will pay back" chosen to be made into an MV.

JMS A&R Executive Kentaro Suzuki put them into the BONEDS 4 Bands Split Album project to help expose 4 selected bands under JMS namely AIR SWELL, BLUE ENCOUNT, SWANKY DANK and My First Story in 2013. Each band was asked to contribute two new songs to the album and AIR SWELL contributed "No Going Back" and ゴブリンズスケルシォ. The latter song features screaming vocals by U from the band ANGRY FROG REBIRTH. The album BONEDS was released on 30 November 2013 by INTACT Records. It was followed by a successful 9-city joint Tour of all the four bands.

In April 2014, they performed as opening acts alongside SiM on Skindred's Japan Tour for 4 dates.

The band released a mini album entitled All Lead Tracks on 4 June 2014. This time, Roach's singer taama was invited as a guest singer on one of the tracks バイバイゲロメタル. This album peaked at number 51 on the Oricon Albums Chart.

In October 2014, bassist Taisuke announced his withdrawal from the band. He cited his reason as "circumstances that made him unable to give 100% to the band anymore" but did not elaborate more to the public. He played his last show with AIR SWELL on 26 October 2014 at Yokohama FAD which was them playing as the guest band for MY FIRST STORY's 虚言NEUROSE Tour.

The band then continued with bassist Hiromitsu who started as a support member at the time. Just like Taisuke, Hiromitsu is a finger-picking bass player. They started working on another album and MY CYLINDERs was released on 25 March 2015 with Hiromitsu already an official member by then. This album peaked at number 57 on the Oricon Albums Chart.

AIR SWELL reunited with their BONEDS rival bands for BONEDS Special Night on 17 July 2015 at Shinkiba Studio Coast, Tokyo.

In June 2016, the band released a special edition CD entitled ツナガルキスナ – unplugged mix to donate the proceeds from the sales to the victims of 2016 Kumamoto earthquakes.

AIR SWELL released another EP SIX KILLS on 25 January 2017.

== Band members ==
Current members

- Hamaken – vocals, guitar (2006–present)
- Hiromitsu – bass, vocals (2014–present)
- Yudai – drums (2006–present)

Former members

- Taisuke – bass (2006–2014)

Timeline

== Discography ==
=== Albums ===
Year	Title	Catalogue No.	Oricon Rank
2010	RIMFIRE: Released: August 2, 2010; Label: INNOVATOR Records	INNO-2002	250
2015	MY CYLINDERs: Released: March 25, 2015; Label: INNOVATOR Records	INNO-2007	57

=== Mini albums ===
Year	Title	Catalogue No.	Oricon Rank
2010	your fairytale is neverending: Released: February 21, 2010; Label: – (Independent release)		
2013	THE ART OF PSYCHO: Released: June 5, 2013; Label: INNOVATOR Records	INNO-2004	72
2014	All Lead Tracks: Released: June 4, 2014; Label: INNOVATOR Records	INNO-2006	51
2017	SIX KILLS: Released: January 25, 2017; Label: INNOVATOR Records	INNO-2012	60

=== Singles ===
Year	Title	Oricon Rank
2010	"ツナガルキズナ": Released: August 20, 2010	–
2016	"ツナガルキズナ – unplugged mix": Released: June 25, 2016	–

=== Compilation appearances ===
Year	Title	Catalogue No.	Type	Oricon Rank
2013	BONEDS ~ 4 Bands Split Album: Released: November 30, 2013; Label: INTACT Records	INRC-0005	Album	37
2014	BONEDS Tour Movie: Released: May 21, 2014; Label: INTACT Records	INRC-0008	DVD	24

=== Collaborations ===
Year	Song	Album	Artist	Notes
2015	"Hands" (featuring Hamaken)	ROACH	ROACH	Released: August 19, 2015
