= Magical Girl Raising Project =

Japanese light novel series and its adaptations

- First light novel volume cover featuring one of the first novel's protagonists, Snow White

魔法少女育成計画 (Mahō Shōjo Ikusei Keikaku)
- Genre: Dark fantasy; Magical girl; Survival action
- Light novel
- Written by: Asari Endō
- Illustrated by: Marui-no
- Published by: Takarajimasha
- English publisher: NA: Yen Press
- Imprint: Kono Light Novel ga Sugoi! Bunko
- Original run: June 8, 2012 – present
- Volumes: 19
- Manga
- Written by: Asari Endō
- Illustrated by: Pochi Edoya
- Published by: Kadokawa Shoten
- English publisher: NA: Yen Press
- Magazine: Comp Ace
- Original run: September 26, 2014 – October 26, 2015
- Volumes: 2
- Manga

Magical Girl Raising Project: Restart
- Written by: Asari Endō
- Illustrated by: Nori-Senbei
- Published by: Kadokawa Shoten
- Magazine: Comp Ace
- Original run: June 2016 – present
- Volumes: 2
- Manga

Magical Girl Raising Project F2P
- Written by: Asari Endō
- Illustrated by: Ryōta Yuzuki
- Published by: Takarajimasha
- Magazine: Kono Manga ga Sugoi! Web
- Original run: August 2016 – November 2026
- Volumes: 5
- Anime television series
- Magical Girl Raising Project (2016)
- Anime television series

Magical Girl Raising Project: Restart
- Directed by: Hiroyuki Hashimoto
- Written by: Takao Yoshioka
- Studio: SynergySP
- Licensed by: OceanVeil: SEA: Medialink
- Original network: TV Tokyo, BS Fuji, AT-X
- Original run: October 6, 2026 – present
- Episodes: 4

Magical Girl Raising Project (魔法少女育成計画, Mahō Shōjo Ikusei Keikaku) is a Japanese light novel series written by Asari Endō and illustrated by Marui-no. Takarajimasha has published eighteen volumes since 2012 under their Kono Light Novel ga Sugoi! Bunko imprint. The series is licensed in English by Yen Press. A manga adaptation with art by Pochi Edoya was serialized in Kadokawa Shoten's Comp Ace magazine between September 2014 and October 2015. An anime television series adaptation by Lerche aired in Japan between October and December 2016. A second season by SynergySP adapting the Restart light novel premiered in October 2026.

== Plot ==
A viral, popular social network game known as the "Magical Girl Raising Project" has the capability to grant players a 1-in-10,000 chance of becoming a real-life magical girl. Each of the magical girls possesses unique skills and special abilities and earns Magical Candies by protecting people and performing good deeds. However, at some point, the administration decided that sixteen magical girls in a certain city were too many, announcing they would cut the number in half by having the magical girl with the fewest Magical Candies each week lose their powers. As the rules of the game get out of control, the girls eventually find themselves dragged into a twisted life-or-death battle against each other.

== Media ==
=== Light novels ===
The light novel series is written by Asari Endō with illustrations by Marui-no. The series debuted in June 2012, with its first volume published under Takarajimasha's Kono Light Novel ga Sugoi! Bunko imprint. Yen Press licensed the series and began publishing English translations in June 2017.

==== Volume list ====
| No. | Title | Original release date | English release date |
|---|---|---|---|
| 1 | Magical Girl Raising Project 魔法少女育成計画 | June 8, 2012; 978-4-7966-8039-4 | June 20, 2017; 978-0-3165-5857-0 |
| 2 | Magical Girl Raising Project: Restart I 魔法少女育成計画 restart（前） | November 9, 2012; 978-4-8002-0182-9 | November 14, 2017; 978-0-3165-5991-1 |
| 3 | Magical Girl Raising Project: Restart II 魔法少女育成計画 restart（後） | December 10, 2012; 978-4-8002-0525-4 | March 27, 2018; 978-0-3165-5996-6 |
| 4 | Magical Girl Raising Project: Episodes 魔法少女育成計画 episodes | April 10, 2013; 978-4-8002-0934-4 | July 17, 2018; 978-0-3165-5999-7 |
| 5 | Magical Girl Raising Project: Limited I 魔法少女育成計画 limited（前） | November 9, 2013; 978-4-8002-1849-0 | November 13, 2018; 978-0-3165-6008-5 |
| 6 | Magical Girl Raising Project: Limited II 魔法少女育成計画 limited（後） | December 9, 2013; 978-4-8002-1852-0 | March 19, 2019; 978-0-3165-6010-8 |
| 7 | Magical Girl Raising Project: Jokers 魔法少女育成計画 JOKERS | August 9, 2014; 978-4-8002-3070-6 | October 29, 2019; 978-1-9753-5863-1 |
| 8 | Magical Girl Raising Project: Aces 魔法少女育成計画 ACES | September 10, 2015; 978-4-8002-4586-1 | March 10, 2020; 978-1-9753-8660-3 |
| 9 | Magical Girl Raising Project: Episodes Φ 魔法少女育成計画 episodesΦ | April 9, 2016; 978-4-8002-5443-6 | July 21, 2020; 978-1-9753-8662-7 |
| 10 | Magical Girl Raising Project: Peaceful Days of 16 Magical Girls 魔法少女育成計画 16人の日常 | October 15, 2016; 978-4-8002-6369-8 | November 17, 2020; 978-1-9753-8664-1 |
| 11 | Magical Girl Raising Project: QUEENS 魔法少女育成計画 QUEENS | December 10, 2016; 978-4-8002-6217-2 | March 23, 2021; 978-1-9753-8667-2 |
| 12 | Magical Girl Raising Project: Episodes Δ 魔法少女育成計画 episodesΔ | June 10, 2019; 978-4-8002-9571-2 | January 18, 2022; 978-1-9753-3544-1 |
| 13 | Magical Girl Raising Project: Black 魔法少女育成計画「黒（ブラック）」 | October 10, 2019; 978-4-8002-9656-6 | May 24, 2022; 978-1-9753-3909-8 |
| 14 | Magical Girl Raising Project: Breakdown I 魔法少女育成計画 breakdown（前） | March 11, 2021; 978-4-299-01441-2 | October 18, 2022; 978-1-9753-4801-4 |
| 15 | Magical Girl Raising Project: Breakdown II 魔法少女育成計画 breakdown（後） | May 10, 2021; 978-4-299-01458-0 | February 21, 2023; 978-1-9753-4845-8 |
| 16 | Magical Girl Raising Project: White 魔法少女育成計画「白（ホワイト）」 | February 10, 2022; 978-4-299-02640-8 | September 19, 2023; 978-1-9753-7343-6 |
| 17 | Magical Girl Raising Project: Episodes Σ 魔法少女育成計画 episodesΣ | April 8, 2022; 978-4-299-02861-7 | February 20, 2024; 978-1-9753-7889-9 |
| 18 | Magical Girl Raising Project: Red 魔法少女育成計画「赤」 | November 27, 2023; 978-4-299-02642-2 | August 20, 2024; 978-1-9753-9827-9 |
| 19 | Magical Girl Raising Project: Restart Peaceful Days of 16 Magical Girls 魔法少女育成計画 restart 16人の日常 | October 9, 2026; 978-4-299-08226-8 | — |

=== Manga ===
The first light novel received a manga adaptation illustrated by Pochi Edoya. This adaptation was collected into two tankōbon volumes and published by Kadokawa in June 26, 2015 and March 26, 2016. Yen Press began publishing English translations of the adaptation in June 2017.

A continuation illustrated by Nori-Senbei began serialization in Kadokawa Shoten's Comp Ace magazine in June 2016. It adapts the second and third light novel volumes, covering the "Restart" arc. As of September 2016, Kadokawa has released one volume.

A spin-off manga written by Asari Endo and illustrated by Ryota Suzuki debuted in Takarajimasha's Kono Manga ga Sugoi! Web service in August 2016. Two volumes were released before going on hiatus in October 2017. Publication resumed in February 2026, and the series ended with five total volumes in November 2026.

==== Volume list ====
| No. | Title | Original release date | English release date |
|---|---|---|---|
| 1 | Magical Girl Raising Project 1 魔法少女育成計画 （１） | June 26, 2015; 978-4-0410-3140-7 | December 19, 2017; 978-0-3164-1418-0 |
| 2 | Magical Girl Raising Project 2 魔法少女育成計画 （２） | March 26, 2016; 978-4-0410-3867-3 | April 24, 2018; 978-0-3165-2131-4 |
| 3 | 魔法少女育成計画restart （１） | September 30, 2016; 978-4-0410-4791-0 | TBA |

=== Anime ===
An anime television series adaptation animated by Lerche and directed by Hiroyuki Hashimoto aired in Japan from October 1 to December 17, 2016. It premiered on AT-X and was simulcast by Crunchyroll. An English simuldub by Funimation was streamed during 2018, starting July 29, 2018. Twelve episodes were released, and the anime was later distributed across four Blu-ray and DVD volumes. The opening theme is "Sakebe" (叫べ, Shout) by Manami Numakura, and the ending theme is "Dreamcatcher" by Nano.

A week after the first series finished airing, Hashimoto announced a second season was uncertain to happen. Seven years later, on January 29, 2023, a second season adapting the Restart light novels was announced. The series is animated by SynergySP, with Hiroyuki Hashimoto returning as director. It premiered on October 6, 2026, on TV Tokyo and OceanVeil. The opening theme is "No tears here" by Minori Chihara, and the ending theme is "ReMind" by Daisy×Daisy. Medialink licensed the series in Southeast Asia for streaming on Ani-One Asia's YouTube channel.

==== Episode list ====
===== Magical Girl Raising Project =====
| No. | Title (Note: All English episode titles are taken from Crunchyroll.) | Original release date |
|---|---|---|
| 1 | "Welcome to a World of Dreams and Magic!" "Yume to Mahō no Sekai e Yōkoso!" (夢と魔法の世界へようこそ！) | October 1, 2016 |
While playing a mobile game known as Magical Girl Raising Project on her smartphone, Koyuki Himekawa, a middle school girl who loves magical girls, is chosen by the mascot character, Fav, to become a real magical girl known as Snow White. As Snow White uses her ability to hear people in danger and help them, she uses her Magical Phone to talk to the other magical girls residing in N-City. The following evening, Snow White is called out by one of these girls, La Pucelle, who reveals herself to be her male childhood friend, Souta Kishibe, and forms a partnership with her. The next day, Fav informs everyone that he plans to reduce the number of magical girls in the city down from sixteen to eight.
| 2 | "Collect Magical Candies!" "Majikaru Kyandī o Atsumeyō!" (マジカルキャンディーを集めよう!) | October 8, 2016 |
Claiming that there is not enough "mana" within the city to support sixteen magical girls, Fav announces that whoever earns the fewest Magical Candies from performing good deeds each week will lose their ability to transform. Reluctantly accepting these new rules, magical girls Ripple and Top Speed recall their encounter with the dangerous outlaw Calamity Mary. Meanwhile, as Snow White continues her duties with La Pucelle, she speaks online with Nemurin, a magical girl who can enter dreams. When the first results are announced, Nemurin ends up with the lowest score and is eliminated from the running. After using her remaining time to visit one more dream, Nemurin is found dead by her mother the next morning.
| 3 | "Update Notice!" "Bājon Appu no Oshirase!" (バージョンアップのお知らせ！) | October 15, 2016 |
Top Speed is asked by Swim Swim to give her a lift to the mountains where her leader, Ruler, is having her group bury trash in order to try and earn more Magical Candies. Meanwhile, Snow White and La Pucelle, along with robot girl Magicaloid 44, are contacted by Sister Nana and Weiss Winterprison, who reveal from a conversation log between Fav and Cranberry the Forest Musician that magical girls allegedly die when they lose their powers. As Magicaloid relays this to Mary, suggesting that they join forces, the Peaky Twins Minael and Yunael rope in dog girl Tama into helping increase their rankings with a promotional video. Eventually, all the girls learn from Fav about what will happen if they drop out, confirming that Nemurin had died as a result. As Snow White is torn over what the right thing to do is, an update is added allowing the girls to exchange Magical Candies with each other. Taking this to mean that magical girls can now steal candies from each other, Ruler tasks her followers with stealing candies from Snow White.
| 4 | "Add More Friends!" "Furendo o Fuyasō!" (フレンドを増やそう!) | October 22, 2016 |
Yunael, Minael, and Tama lure La Pucelle away while Ruler has Swim Swim steal all of Snow White's Magical Candies. However, when the weekly results are announced, it is revealed that Swim Swim had actually only taken half of Snow White's candies and split them among all the other magical girls except for Ruler, who ends up in last place and dies as a result. It is revealed that Swim Swim, having been influenced by Nemurin when she visited her dream, conspired with the Peaky Twins to betray Ruler and become their new leader. Meanwhile, as Top Speed and Ripple meet up with Nana and Winterprison, another magical girl is searching for a white magical girl.
| 5 | "New Character!" "Shin Kyara o Tsuikashimashita!" (新キャラを追加しました!) | October 29, 2016 |
Nana suggests to the others that they work together to find a way to stop the cruel system, but Ripple seems unwilling to co-operate. Nana then turns to Magicaloid, who had secretly been using her for monetary gain by supplying her with useless gadgets from the future which she wanted to use to make Weiss into a magical girl, offering her more money in exchange for negotiating with the admins. Nana and Winterprison are then called out by Cranberry, who reveals she is perfectly happy with the current nature of the game and launches an attack against them. Weiss fights using her earth magic, along with Nana's enhancement magic, but is overwhelmed by Cranberry's ability to manipulate soundwaves, which forces them to retreat. The next evening, as Nana and Winterprison meet the most recent magical girl, Hardgore Alice, who goes off in search of Snow White, La Pucelle is confronted by Cranberry.
| 6 | "Get the Super-Rare Items!" "Geki-Rea Aitemu o Getto shiyō!" (激レアアイテムをゲットしよう！) | November 5, 2016 |
La Pucelle battles against Cranberry, who seeks to kill opponents stronger than her. Overwhelmed by Cranberry's strength, La Pucelle is brutally beaten before being thrown in front of an oncoming vehicle and killed. Although Fav announces this to be an accident, a slip of tongue causes Snow White to realize that La Pucelle was in fact murdered. Fav also announces a set of first-come first-served items, which girls pay for in exchange for taking years off of their lifespan, that are quickly sold out before Snow White can buy one for herself. Just then, Snow White is approached by Alice, who is instantly beheaded by Magicaloid under orders from Mary. Before she can kill Snow White, however, Magicaloid is herself killed by Alice, who somehow managed to survive her beheading.
| 7 | "Up Your Friendship!" "Shinmitsudo o Ageyō!" (親密度を上げよう!) | November 12, 2016 |
Snow White, still traumatized over the previous night's events, finds herself with a Rabbit's Foot item that Alice had left behind. Meanwhile, Mary, having learned about Magicaloid's death, goes to confront Alice, quickly discovering she has powerful strength and regenerative abilities. Despite using various methods to try and kill her, Mary finds that Alice has still somehow managed to survive following Fav's report. Later, Snow White once again comes across Alice, who reveals she wanted her to have the Rabbit's Foot, while Winterprison and Nana go to meet with Swim Swim's group.
| 8 | "Sudden Event in Session!" "Gerira Ibento Hassei-chū!" (ゲリライベント発生中!) | November 19, 2016 |
Upon Winterprison and Nana's arrival, Swim Swim has the Peaky Twins use Nana's appearance to sneak up on Winterprison and stab her with a knife. Urging Nana to escape without her, Winterprison kills Yunael as an act of revenge before she herself is killed by Swim Swim, sending both Nana and Minael into despair. The next evening, Mary, who sets out to try and kill Ripple and Top Speed, begins killing innocent civilians on the highway in order to prevent their escape. As Swim Swim sees this as an opportunity to kill any magical girls heading towards the scene, Cranberry becomes determined to fight the one who killed Winterprison.
| 9 | "Notice of New Rules" "Rūru Henkō no Oshirase" (ルール変更のお知らせ) | November 26, 2016 |
Ripple goes to confront Mary head on, only to end up stepping on a landmine that will explode as soon as she steps off of it. After rescuing her from that situation, Top Speed responds to Ripple's desire to do what is right and goes back with her to confront Mary. Sneaking up from below, Ripple manages to kill Mary with a shuriken to the head, only for Swim Swim to suddenly appear and kill Top Speed as well. After Swim Swim escapes, Ripple is saddened to discover that Top Speed was pregnant with a child. Meanwhile, as Snow White and Alice are briefly confronted by Minael and Tama while trying to help out civilians, Nana hangs herself over the loss of Winterprison. Despite the number of magical girls in the city being reduced below the planned eight as a result of all the deaths, Fav announces that there are now plans to further reduce this number down to four.
| 10 | "Sudden Battle Chances Up!" "Ran'nyū Batoru Kakuhen-chū!" (乱入バトル確変中!) | December 3, 2016 |
Just as it seems they are finally getting along with each other, Snow White vent her frustrations at Alice following Fav's latest update on the new deaths and rule changes. On her way to school the next day, Alice is attacked in her civilian form by Swim Swim, who had learned of her secret identity after Minael disguised herself as Alice's stuffed rabbit. In her final moments, Alice calls out to Snow White, thanking her for giving her a reason to live and leaving her with the Lucky Rabbit's Foot before passing away. Meanwhile, it is revealed that Cranberry and Fav arranged the death match as a selection exam to recruit magical girls for the Land of Magic. Later, Swim Swim prepares to confront Cranberry, who thwarts an ambush attempt from the others, injuring Tama and killing Minael.
| 11 | "Server Down for Maintenance" "Sābā Mentenansu Chū desu" (サーバーメンテナンス中です) | December 10, 2016 |
Attempting a pincer attack, Swim Swim is knocked back after Cranberry uses light and sound to attack her liquid form. Upon becoming distracted from discovering that Swim Swim is actually an elementary child, Cranberry is killed by Tama after she hits her with her hole-creation ability. However, Swim Swim then suddenly kills Tama for discovering her identity, after which Fav labels her the new role of Master. Sometime later, Snow White meets with Ripple, who is determined to kill Swim Swim in order to avenge Top Speed. Although Snow White tries to reason with Ripple not to become a murderer, Fav spurs her on by telling her Swim Swim's weakness and declaring the game won't end until two magical girls are left standing.
| 12 | "File not found" | December 17, 2016 |
As Ripple goes to confront Swim Swim, Fav informs Snow White that he is actually a scout for the Magical Girl Recruitment and Training Project, where successful magical girls are either recruited into the World of Magic or made into a Master to oversee the next exam. He further reveals that he intentionally riled up Ripple and Swim Swim, whom he feels wouldn't make suitable Masters, so they would kill each other, wanting Snow White to be his new Master instead. Learning that it was because of Fav's malfunction that everyone had to kill each other, Snow White breaks her magical terminal and rushes to try and stop Ripple and Swim Swim. While losing an eye and an arm, Ripple manages to knock out Swim Swim with a flash grenade, killing her in her civilian form before passing out. Arriving at the scene too late, Snow White attempts to destroy the Master Terminal, which Fav gloats can't be destroyed so easily. Thanks to Snow White's Rabbit's Foot, however, Ripple manages to regain consciousness and uses Swim Swim's magical weapon to destroy the terminal, along with Fav. Six months later, Snow White trains with Ripple to become a stronger magical girl who can help others around the world.

===== Magical Girl Raising Project: RESTART =====
| No. | Title | Original release date |
|---|---|---|
| 1 | "Hallo Daisy"; Transliteration: "Harodeiji" (Japanese: ハローデイジー) | October 6, 2026 |
Pechika—real name: Chika Tatehara—is a magical girl who uses her cute appearance and food-producing magic to impress her crush, Ninomiya. However, she is suddenly teleported to a desert and attacked by skeletons as part of a "tutorial". Fortunately, another magical girl, Akane, saves her, only to then interrogate her about a "musician", though she ultimately lets Pechika go and leaves. Afterward, Pechika wanders the desert until she stumbles upon three more magical girls: Claintail, Rionetta, and Nonako Miyokata. While Pechika tries to stay hidden, the three spot and capture her. Meanwhile, popular magical girl Magical Daisy—real name: Kiku Yakumo—lives as a broke college student when she is also teleported into the tutorial, which she beats. Akane then attacks Daisy but leaves after concluding Daisy isn't her target. Afterward, Daisy encounters three other magical girls, Nokko, Genopsyko Yumenoshima, and @Meow-Meow, before receiving a message about a "support command". Concurrently, three more magical girls, Pfle, Shadow Gale, and Masked Wonder, complete the tutorial, with Pfle deducing they are in a video game. Elsewhere, the magical girl Keek watches a video of Snow White and asserts to her fairy, Fal, that magical girls chosen through combat shouldn't exist.
| 2 | "The Players"; Transliteration: "Pureiyā-tachi" (Japanese: プレイヤー達) | October 12, 2026 |
When Daisy, Nokko, Genopsyko, and @Meow-Meow activate the support command, Fal appears and claims they have been chosen to test a magical girl training simulator and will receive 10,000,000 yen for beating it. Meanwhile, Pechika, Claintail, Rionetta, and Nonako get the same explanation and, although Pechika wants out, the others agree to beta-test for the prize money, making Pechika their final party member. Elsewhere, Pfle, Shadow Gale, and Masked Wonder unlock a new area. After Pfle leaves to buy a monster manual, Masked Wonder asks Shadow Gale about their relationship, since they already knew each other before the game, prompting Shadow Gale to explain that she is Pfle's butler. The two are then attacked by magical girl Cherna Mouse, who claims the new area for her team, though Cherna's teammates, Lapis Lazuline and Melville, appear and help defuse the situation. Back with Daisy's party, they enter the new area and get confronted by a new enemy: a red skeleton. Daisy shoots it with her magic—a laser—but the enemy reflects it back, killing her. Although Fal claimed that in-game damage doesn't carry over into real life, Nokko, Genopsyko, and @Meow-Meow are disturbed when Daisy's corpse doesn't despawn.
| 3 | "Delicious Food Makes Everyone Happy"; Transliteration: "Oishī ryōri de min'na shiawase" (Japanese: 美味しい料理でみんな幸せ) | October 19, 2026 |
All the magical girls are teleported together, and Fal announces they have reached the end of this game session and will celebrate with a race for a special reward, after which they will return to reality for three days before the next session commences. In the end, Pfle wins and entrusts the reward to Masked Wonder. Back in reality, Pfle—real name: Kanoe Hitokouji—and Shadow Gale—real name: Mamori Totoyama—discuss the situation, with Pfle wondering why non-combat magical girls are forced to test a combat simulator. Meanwhile, Cherna, Lazuline, and Melville's teammate, Detec Bell—real name: Shinobu Hioka—uses her real-life detective skills to investigate Daisy's fate following her elimination from the game. Three days later, everyone returns to the game, where Pfle and Shadow Gale discover Masked Wonder has been killed, her head smashed in from behind with a rock. Elsewhere, after regrouping with her party, Pechika treats them to some of her magically created food, and they start bonding. However, Fal then suddenly teleports all the magical girls together at Bell's request. Bell then reveals the result of her investigation into Daisy: when Daisy was eliminated from the game, she also died in real life.
| 4 | "The Detective and the Murder Case"; Transliteration: "Tantei to satsujin jiken" (Japanese: 探偵と殺人事件) | October 26, 2026 |
Fal clarifies that, while in-game injuries do not carry over into real life, participants will die of a heart attack if they are eliminated. Pfle then reveals Masked Wonder's death and the theft of the reward item, meaning a participant must be the culprit. The others let Pfle check their items for the stolen reward, but she finds nothing until only Akane remains unchecked. Pfle and Genopsyko ask for her cooperation, but Akane kills Genopsyko before attacking the others, demanding they reveal where the "musician" is, culminating in @Meow-Meow killing Akane. Afterward, while everyone else assumes Akane was the culprit, Pfle discovers she did not have the reward item either. Also, Genopsyko's corpse disappeared in the chaos, with Cherna, Lazuline, and Melville later claiming they saw her seemingly alive. Elsewhere, Fal tries to convince Keek to let the participants go and use him as a scapegoat for abducting them, but she refuses. Meanwhile, with Cherna monopolizing monster spawning grounds, Pfle and Shadow Gale team up with Nokko and @Meow-Meow and challenge her to a duel, building a giant robot to fight Cherna's gigantification magic.
| 5 | "Mysterious Candy"; Transliteration: "Fukashigina kyandi" (Japanese: 不可思議なキャンディー) | November 2, 2026 |

=== Stage plays ===
The F2P spinoff manga series was adapted as a stage play by Odd Entertainment and directed by Toshiki Tanabe. The play was performed in Tokyo from February 6–10, 2025.

On September 17, 2026, Odd Entertainment announced another play was being produced to adapt the first light novel volume. The play is directed by Saki Nagata and will be performed in Tokyo from January 8 to 13, 2027.

== Reception ==
=== Light novels ===
It is gritty, painful to read at times, and totally a surprise for those going in expecting a cutesy Magical Girl story based on the chibi-like artwork.

— Cody Perez, The Fandom Post

The first novel received mixed reviews. S-F Magazine critic Itoichi Fuyuki praised the novel for its complex cast of characters and battle royale story. To Fuyuki, the battle royale elements allow the novel to quickly place its characters in extreme situations that reveal irrational behaviors or unexpected courage; he further praised the novel for not dwelling on right or wrong, and instead focusing on the contrast between cruelty and the desire to help others. Writing for The Fandom Post, Cody Perez also praised the novel for its cast of characters and character development: "The characters are the star of the novel. The 16 magical girls are so vastly different, even if most are filling a specific trope". However, Perez viewed the novel as being inferior to its anime adaptation and criticized the novel's handling of character deaths, seeing them as abrupt and lacking in detail.

The second and third novels were well received. Critics viewed the novels as surpassing the first, praising them for their mystery story and stronger cast of characters. Perez wrote, "with just as strong – if not stronger – characters and equal attention given to all of the 16 girls almost equally, Magical Girl Raising Project Volume 2 exceeded my expectations by expanding upon what made the original great". His primary criticism with the novels was the lack of focus given to Snow White's presence. Reviewing for Anime News Network, Richard Eisenbeis compared the novels to the mystery stories of Agatha Christie and called them a "fantastic classic murder mystery set within a death game". Eisenbeis also shared the criticism of Snow White not receiving enough attention.
