= Hiroki Moriuchi =

Japanese singer

- 森内寛樹
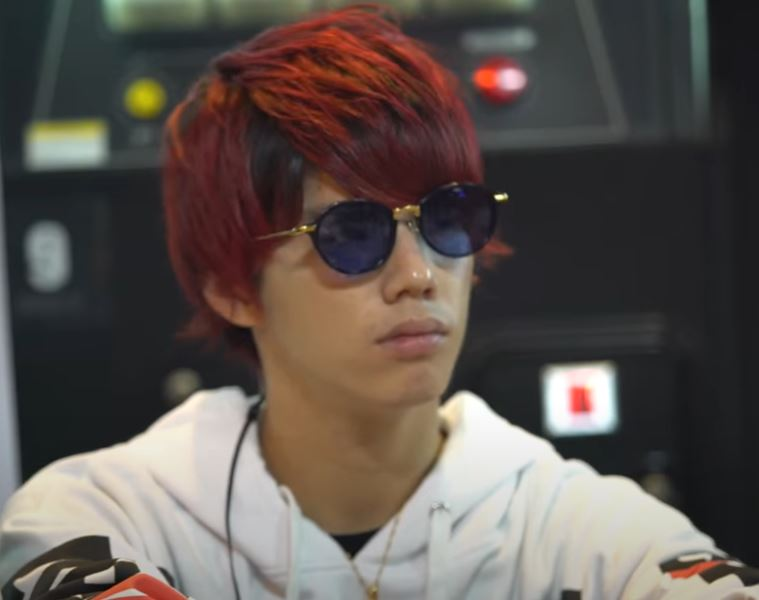
- Hiro in September 2018
- Born: January 25, 1994 (age 32); Tokyo, Japan
- Occupations: Singer; lyricist; composer
- Spouse: Maika Yamamoto (m. 2024)
- Children: 1
- Parents: Shinichi Mori (father); Masako Mori (mother)
- Relatives: Takahiro Moriuchi (brother) Tomohiro Moriuchi (brother)
- Musical career
- Also known as: Hiro
- Genres: Rock; post hardcore
- Instrument: Vocals
- Years active: 2002–present
- Labels: Intact Records; Universal Music Japan; Johnny & Associates (2002–2005)
- Member of: My First Story
- Formerly of: Johnny's Entertainment (2002–2005)
- Website: My First Story official website

YouTube information
- Channel: 森ちゃんねる
- Years active: 2022–present
- Genre: Vlog
- Subscribers: 199 thousand
- Views: 31.51 million
- Last updated: August, 2026

Hiroki Moriuchi (森内 寛樹, Moriuchi Hiroki) (born January 25, 1994, in Tokyo), better known professionally as Hiro, is a Japanese singer and the lead vocalist of the Japanese rock band My First Story.

== Personal life ==
Hiro was born on January 25, 1994, the youngest son of Japanese singers Masako Mori and Shinichi Mori. He has two elder brothers, the eldest of whom is Takahiro Moriuchi, the lead singer of the band One Ok Rock and Tomohiro Moriuchi who works on TV Tokyo. In April 2005, his parents divorced when he was 11. Following the divorce, he and his older brother, Tomohiro, resided with their father; their mother took custody of their oldest brother, Takahiro.

=== Marriage ===
Hiro announced his marriage to actress and model Maika Yamamoto on October 13, 2024, through a post in his official social media account. On May 5, 2026, his wife announced that she was pregnant with their first child. In August 7, his wife announced that she had given birth to their first child.

== Career ==
=== 2002–2005: Career beginnings and other musical pursuits ===
Hiro signed with Johnny's Entertainment on December 1, 2002, when he was 8 years old. He was the youngest Johnny's Jr. and remained active until 2005.

=== 2011–present: MY FIRST STORY ===
He is currently active as the lead vocalist of the Japanese rock band, My First Story, which was formed in Shibuya in 2011. He released his solo debut album Sing;est on January 20, 2021, through Universal Music Japan. It contains ten covers of songs originally performed by exclusively female vocalists.

== Discography ==
=== Albums ===
List of studio albums, with selected chart positions
Title	Album details	Peak chart positions		Sales
Title	Album details	JPN	JPN Hot	Sales
Sing;est	Released: January 20, 2021; Label: Universal Music Japan; Formats: CD, digital download	7	5	JPN: 21,711

=== Collaborations ===
Title	Year	Peak chart position		Album
Title	Year	JPN	JPN Hot	Album
"Savior of Song" (Nano feat. My First Story)	2013	*	25	Rock On
"Sink Like a Stone" (Swanky Dank feat. Hiro)	2014	*	–	Circles
"Reimei" (レイメイ) (Sayuri with My First Story)	2018	*	10	Non-album single
"Black Memory" (The Oral Cigarettes feat. Hiro)	2022	–	–	Bullets into the Pipe
"Airbnb" (あいるびーばっく) (BAK (Chimeraz) feat. Hiro)	2023	–	–	Non-album singles
"I Promise You" (Ryo (Supercell) feat. Hiro)	2024	–	–	Non-album singles
"Unmei to Struggle" (運命と Struggle; "Fate and Struggle") (Ryo (Supercell) feat. Hiro)	2024	–	–	Non-album singles

== Videography ==
=== Music videos ===
Title	Year	Ref.
"Savior of Song" Nano feat. My First Story	2013	
"Sink Like a Stone" Swanky Dank feat. Hiro	2014	
"Reimei" Sayuri with My First Story	2018	

=== Music video appearances ===
Title	Year	Artist(s)	Ref.
"Tokyo 4am"	2022	Chanmina	

== Awards and nominations ==
Name of the award ceremony, year presented, category, nominee(s) of the award, and the result of the nomination
Award ceremony	Year	Category	Nominee(s)/work(s)	Result	Ref.
Japan Record Awards	2023	Best Lyricist Award	"I'm a Mess"	Won	
