= Takahiro Moriuchi =

Japanese singer-songwriter (born 1988)

- 森内 貴寛
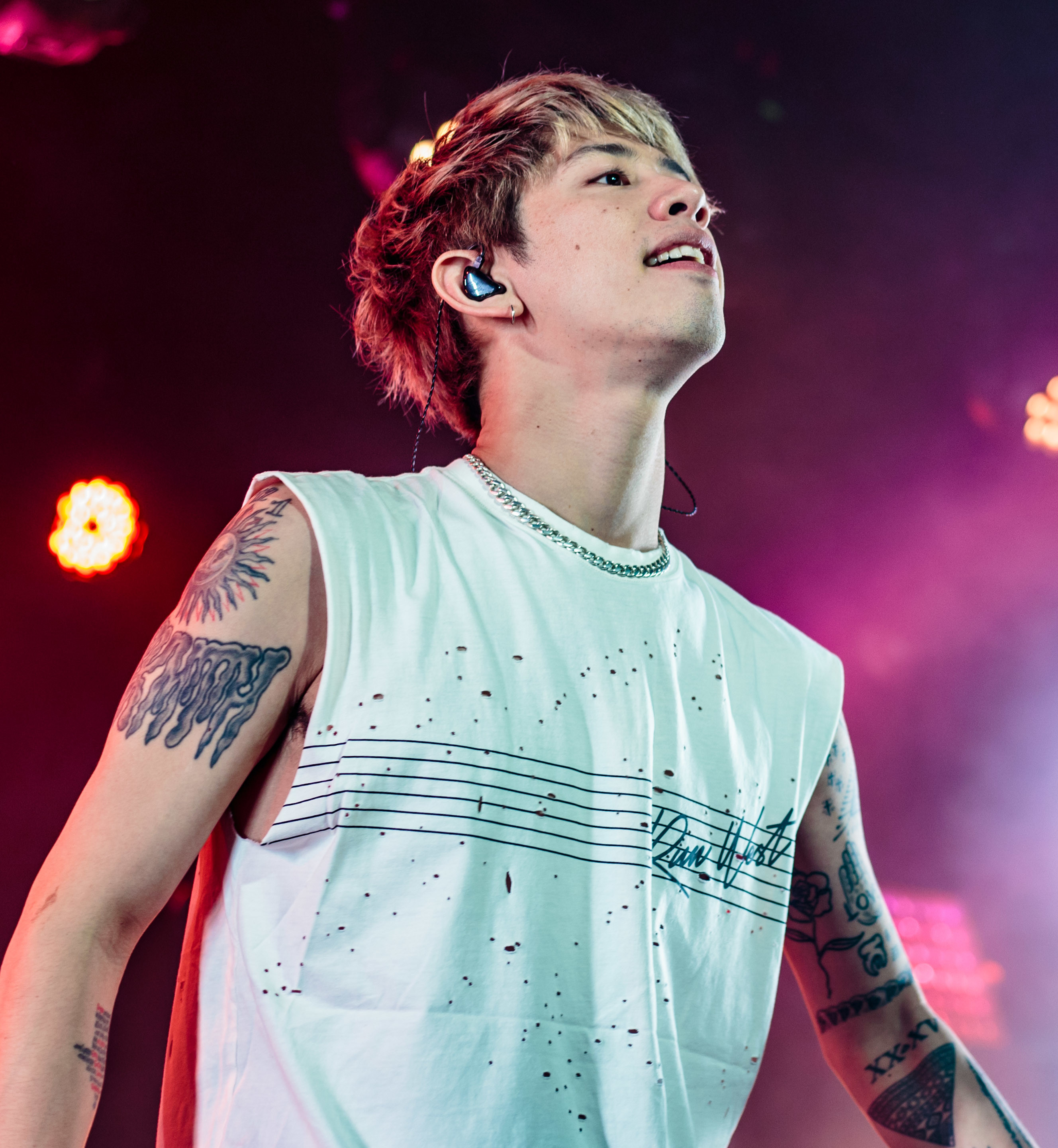
- Moriuchi performing in Budapest in 2019
- Born: Moriuchi Takahiro; April 17, 1988 (age 38); Tokyo, Japan
- Occupations: Singer; lyricist; composer
- Years active: 2001–2003; 2005–present
- Parents: Shinichi Mori (father); Masako Mori (mother)
- Relatives: Hiroki Moriuchi (brother); Maika Yamamoto (sister-in-law)
- Musical career
- Also known as: Taka
- Genres: Alternative rock; post-hardcore
- Instruments: Vocals; guitar; piano
- Labels: Fueled by Ramen; Warner Bros.; 10969 Inc.
- Member of: One Ok Rock
- Formerly of: Chivalry of Music; NEWS
- Website: oneokrock.com

Takahiro Moriuchi (Japanese: 森内 貴寛, Hepburn: Moriuchi Takahiro; born April 17, 1988, in Tokyo), known professionally as Taka, is a Japanese singer and musician who is the lead vocalist of the Japanese rock band One Ok Rock. Moriuchi is the band's main lyricist and composer. In 2017, Kerrang! magazine placed him at number 27 on their list of the "50 Greatest Rockstars in the World". He was also listed by Rock Sound magazine as one of "50 Most Influential Figures in Rock".

Prior to One Ok Rock, he was in the boyband NEWS throughout 2003 until he left the group and the agency. He performs in English and Japanese.

== Personal life ==
Taka was born on April 17, 1988, the eldest son of famous Japanese singers Masako Mori and Shinichi Mori. He has two younger brothers named Tomohiro Moriuchi who works at TV Tokyo, and Hiroki Moriuchi who is the lead singer of the band My First Story. His sister-in-law is model and actress Maika Yamamoto.

He attended Keio Elementary School and graduated in March 2001, then continued his studies at Keio Middle School in April 2001. He joined soccer club in his first year of middle school. In April 2004, he attended Keio High School until his first year of high school (March 2005). He then dropped out to pursue his musical career, which his parents opposed knowing how hard it can be to become successful. After dropping out of high school, after a fight with his parents he left home and lived with his grandmother. During this time, he took up a part-time job at a restaurant in Aoyama to prepare himself for living alone. In April 2005, his parents divorced.

In 2005, he changed his last name from Moriuchi (森内) to Morita (森田) due to the divorce of his parents. However, in the June 2012 issue of the magazine, Rockin'On Japan, he stated in an interview that his real name is Takahiro Moriuchi. In 2013, he is shown again in a photo using his last name, Moriuchi, where all One Ok Rock band members held a written sign of their real names. The photo was taken by the band's official photographer Rui Hashimoto.

Taka wrote the song "Nobody's Home" on fourth album Niche Syndrome, tells about his apology and gratitude straightforwardly for his parents. The song was performed at several concerts, including at the Nippon Budokan in 2010 where his parents attended the concert. On November 14, 2023, he and his brother Hiroki performed "Nobody's Home" together with their bands on My First Story x One Ok Rock concert "VS" at Tokyo Dome.

=== Health ===
On July 2, 2024, Taka revealed in a post that he suffers from panic disorder.

== Career ==
=== 2001–2004: Career beginnings and other musical pursuits ===
Taka signed with Johnny's Entertainment in August 2001 at age 13. He joined as a trainee in the group called Johnny's Junior and made some singing appearances on Japanese music shows during this period. In September 2003, two years after joining the agency, Taka was one of the Johnny's Juniors chosen to be part of the idol group NEWS. However, his activities were suspended when he left the agency and the group in December of the same year.

He was briefly in the cover band Chivalry of Music in 2004, comprising a keyboardist, guitarist, and himself on vocals.

=== 2005–present: One Ok Rock ===
Taka was invited by guitarist Toru Yamashita to join One Ok Rock in 2005. The band released their first independent CD in 2006 and were signed by Amuse, Inc., whom they made their major debut with.

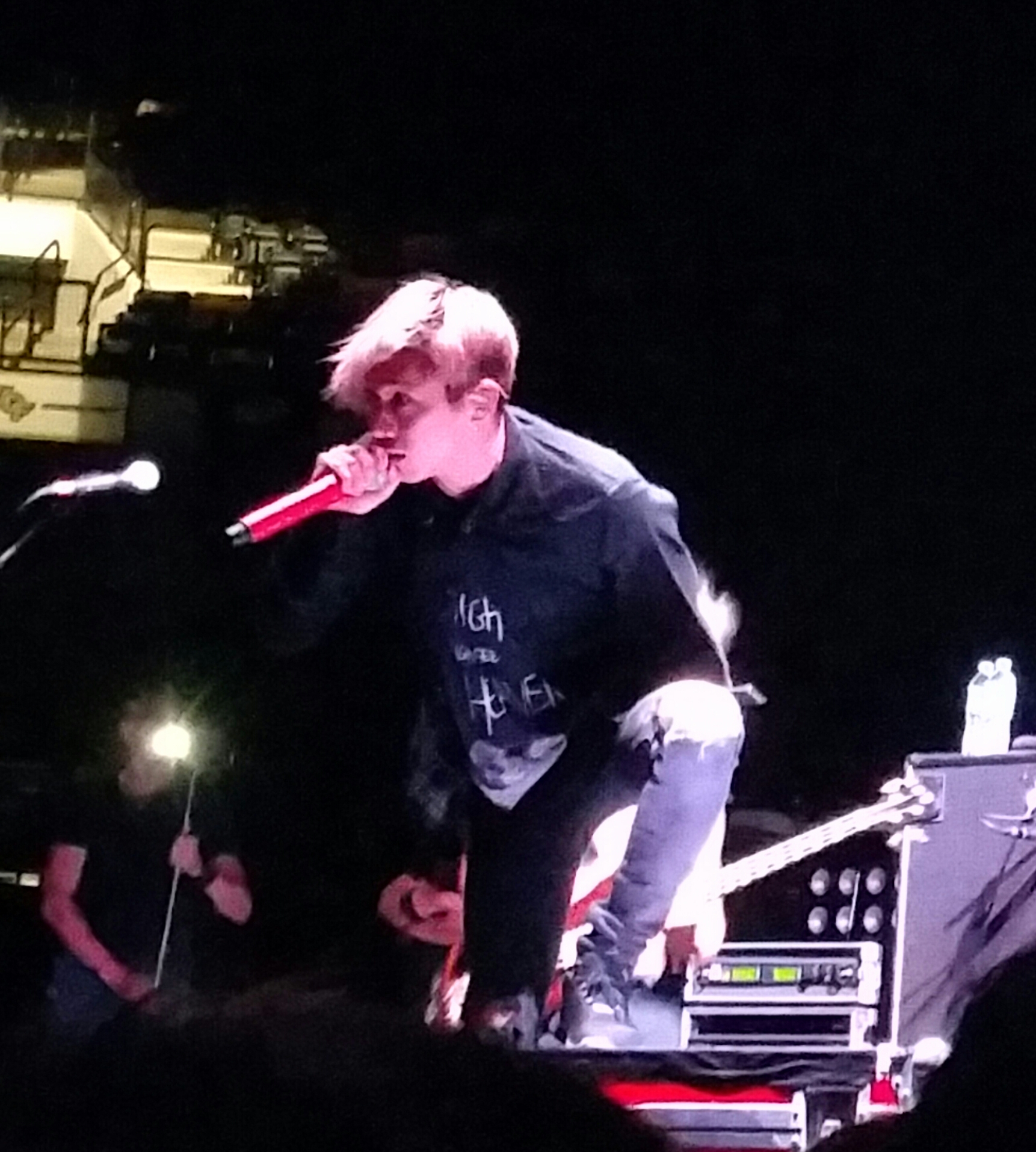
Moriuchi performing in 2015

The band tours extensively in Japan, but ONE OK ROCK has also held concert tours overseas in Asia, the U.S., Europe and South America.

In March 2013, Simple Plan announced a new version of their song "Summer Paradise" with Moriuchi for a Japanese-only release They later performed together at the music festival, Punkspring 2013 in Tokyo, Japan.

In November 2013, Taka helped Pay Money to My Pain to sing and write one of their songs on their tribute album Gene after their vocalist, K (後藤慶, Kei Gotō), died due to heart failure.

In summer 2014, One Ok Rock's newest songs, "Mighty Long Fall" and "Heartache" were featured as theme songs for the live action movie sequels, Rurouni Kenshin: Kyoto Inferno and Rurouni Kenshin: The Legend Ends, respectively.

In February 2015, Moriuchi was featured as a guest vocalist on the track "Dreaming Alone" by Against the Current.

As of July 2015, One Ok Rock is signed with the U.S. label, Warner Bros. Records and released an English version of their album, 35xxxv in February 2015.

On September 11, 2016, One Ok Rock signed with Fueled by Ramen. Their eighth album, Ambitions, was released on January 11, 2017, for the Japanese version album under the Japanese label A-Sketch and on January 13, 2017, for the English version album under the American label Fueled by Ramen.

In July 2017, Moriuchi was featured on the track "Don't Let Me Go" from Goldfinger's album The Knife as a guest vocalist. On 27 October 2017, he appeared at Linkin Park and Friends – Celebrate Life in Honor of Chester Bennington, performing "Somewhere I Belong" with the remaining members of Linkin Park. On May 12, 2018, he guested on Linkin Park co-vocalist Mike Shinoda's show at Identity Festival in Los Angeles, performing "Waiting for the End / Where'd You Go" mash-up.

On September 14, 2020, Journey frontman Arnel Pineda collaborated with him covering the 1981 Journey classic ballad "Open Arms". The cover was recorded separately in isolation, and uploaded on Pineda's YouTube channel.

In 2025, the he contributed to the original soundtrack of the Netflix original series Glass Heart in 2025.

== Artistry ==
=== Influences ===
His greatest influences are Linkin Park, Good Charlotte, The Used, Red Hot Chili Peppers, Thirty Seconds to Mars, hide, Maroon 5, Adele, Rize, Issues, Sum 41, Green Day and Simple Plan. His favorite artists are X Japan, Bring Me the Horizon, Radwimps, Michael Jackson, Vanessa Carlton, Attack Attack!, Asking Alexandria, Destrage, Coldplay, Nickelback, Twenty One Pilots and Avril Lavigne. He has also cited Chester Bennington from Linkin Park and Kellin Quinn from Sleeping With Sirens as his inspirations to switch from pop music to rock music.

=== Voice ===
Moriuchi's high tenor voice has been praised by vocal experts for its wide and dynamic range, smooth transitions between registers, emotiveness, power, tone, as well as his breath control, and ability to change textures and hold out high notes for a long time. Experts agree that he is one of the most well-trained rock vocalists in the current musical scene.

== Discography ==
=== Collaborations ===
Song	Artist(s)	Album	Year	Notes	Ref.
"Summer Paradise"	Simple Plan featuring Taka (One Ok Rock)	Get Your Heart On! (Japan Tour Edition)	2013		
"Bottle Rocket"	Grown Kids featuring Taka (One Ok Rock) & Megan Joy	First Words	2014		
"Dreaming Alone"	Against the Current featuring Taka (One Ok Rock)	Gravity	2015		
"Primavera"	F.T. Island	5.....GO	2015	Moriuchi is co-composer for both songs.	
"My Birthday"	F.T. Island	5.....GO	2015	Moriuchi is co-composer for both songs.	
"By My Side"	Yojiro Noda (Radwimps) featuring Taka (One Ok Rock)	バイ・マイ・サイ (By My Side)	2016		
"Higher Ground"	Aimer	Daydream	2016	Moriuchi as a producer and composer.	
"Stars in the rain"	Aimer	Daydream	2016	Moriuchi as a composer.	
"War"	Sum 41 feat. Taka of One Ok Rock	13 Voices (Japanese edition)	2016		
"Yung & Dum"	Issues featuring Taka of One Ok Rock	Headspace (Japanese edition)	2017		
"Don't Let Me Go"	Goldfinger featuring Takahiro Moriuchi of One Ok Rock	The Knife	2017		
"Ikijibiki"	Radwimps feat Taka	Anti Anti Generation	2018		
"Lights Down Low" (re-recorded)	MAX featuring Taka (One Ok Rock)	Non-album single	2019		
"Curtain Call"	Shota Shimizu featuring Taka (One Ok Rock)	Hope	2021		
"Falling"	Jin featuring Taka	Non-album single	2024	Moriuchi as a songwriter and producer	

=== Non-One Ok Rock songs written by Takahiro Moriuchi ===
Key
†	Indicate song released as single

Song title, original artist, album of release, and year of release
Song	Artist(s)	Writer(s)	Album	Year	Ref.
"Let Life Be"	Ally & Diaz featuring Taka (One Ok Rock) & サイプレス上野 (Cypress Ueno)	Taka, Cypress Ueno	Ally & Diaz	2011	
"Voice"	Pay Money to My Pain feat. Taka from One Ok Rock	Taka	Gene	2013	
"Insane Dream" †	Aimer	Aimer, Taka, Jamil Kazmi	Daydream	2016	
"Closer"	Aimer	Taka, Jamil Kazmi	Daydream	2016	
"Falling Alone" †	Aimer	Taka, Jamil Kazmi	Daydream	2016	
"I Want a Billion" †	Kohh	Carlo Colasacco, Pete Nappi, Taka, Yuki Chiba	Untitled	2019	
"Action" †	Don Broco featuring Taka (One Ok Rock), Tyler Carter (Issues), Caleb Shomo (Beartooth), and Tilian Pearson (Dance Gavin Dance)	Tom Doyle, Taka Moriuchi, Simon Delaney, Robert Damiani, Matthew Donnelly, Laurence Hibbitt, Dan Lancaster, Caleb Shomo	Non-album single	2019	
"Rainbow" †	ReN Feat. Taka	Daniel Ledinsky, Jamil Kazmi, ReN, Takahiro Moriuch	ReNBRANDT	2021	
"Victim of Love" †	Ayaka featuring Taka	Ayaka, Taka	Love Cycle	2022	
"Sayonara Saraba" †	BiSH	Taka, MEG, Kenta	-	2022	
"A long way to go" †	BiSH	Taka, MEG, JxSxK	-	2022	

=== Appearances on music videos ===
List of music videos showing year released, artists and notes
Title	Year	Artist(s)	Role(s)		Notes	Music video
Title	Year	Artist(s)	Actor	Singer	Notes	Music video
"Summer Paradise"	2013	Simple Plan	Yes	Yes	Japanese edition	
"Bottle Rocket"	2014	Grown Kids	Yes	Yes		
"Dreaming Alone"	2015	Against the Current	Yes	Yes		
"Boys"	2017	Charli XCX	Yes	No	Features 75 celebrity cameos in total	
"I Want a Billion"	2019	Kohh	Yes	Yes	360-degree video	
"Action"	2019	Don Broco	No	Yes	Taka as Taka-tron, an action figure of himself	
"Baseball Bat"	2020	SiM	Yes	No	Features 25 bands in total	
"Mōichido" (もう一度 Once More)	2020	Re: Project	Yes	Yes	Also features Aimer, Ayaka, Daichi Miura, Kenta of Wanima, Mao Abe, Shota Shimizu, and Takahiro Nishijima of AAA	
"Curtain Call"	2021	Shota Shimizu	Yes	Yes		
"Victim of Love"	2022	Ayaka	Yes	Yes		
"Tokyo 4am"	2022	Chanmina	Yes	No	Features 26 cameos including Hiro of My First Story, Sky-Hi, and Thelma Aoyama	
