= Magical Girl Raising Project (TV series) =

Japanese anime series

魔法少女育成計画 (Mahō Shōjo Ikusei Keikaku)
- Genre: Magical girl; Survival action; Battle royale
- Created by: Asari Endō
- Anime television series
- Directed by: Hiroyuki Hashimoto
- Written by: Takao Yoshioka
- Music by: Takurou Iga
- Studio: Lerche
- Licensed by: Crunchyroll (Note: Crunchyroll simulcast in all regions except China, Taiwan, Hong Kong, Macau, North Korea, and South Korea.); NA: Funimation
- Original network: AT-X, Tokyo MX, BS11
- Original run: October 2, 2016 – December 18, 2016
- Episodes: 12
- icon

Magical Girl Raising Project (魔法少女育成計画, Mahō Shōjo Ikusei Keikaku) is a Japanese anime television series directed by Hiroyuki Hashimoto and produced by Lerche. The series is based on the 2012 light novel of the same name written by Asari Endō and illustrated by Marui-no. It originally broadcast for twelve episodes on AT-X from October 2 to December 18, 2016. The story follows sixteen people as they are forced to participate in a death game after a smartphone game turns them into magical girls.

The critical reception to Magical Girl Raising Project was mixed. Critics praised the varied cast of characters and story twists, but felt it had poor pacing and an over-reliance on shock value.

A sequel series, Magical Girl Raising Project: Restart, premiered on October 6, 2026, on TV Tokyo.

== Plot ==
A popular smartphone game offers the rare chance to become a real magical girl, complete with magical powers. Sixteen players are selected to become magical girls, and they set out to help people in need, earning Magical Candies in return. However, one day, the game's administrators announce there are too many magical girls; half of them need to go. Each week, the player with the fewest Magical Candies will be killed. As the game's rules become more harsh, the competition becomes a battle for survival.

== Production ==
Magical Girl Raising Project is an adaptation of the 2012 light novel of the same name, which was created by Asari Endō and illustrated by Marui-no. The series was produced by Lerche and directed by Hiroyuki Hashimoto. The script was written by Takao Yoshioka, and the characters were adapted to animation by Yukiko Aikei. The English dub was directed by Jad Saxton based on scripts written by Kristen McGuire.

The music was composed by Takurou Iga. The opening theme is "Sakebe" by Manami Numakura, the Japanese voice actor for Ripple; the ending theme is "Dreamcatcher" by Nano.

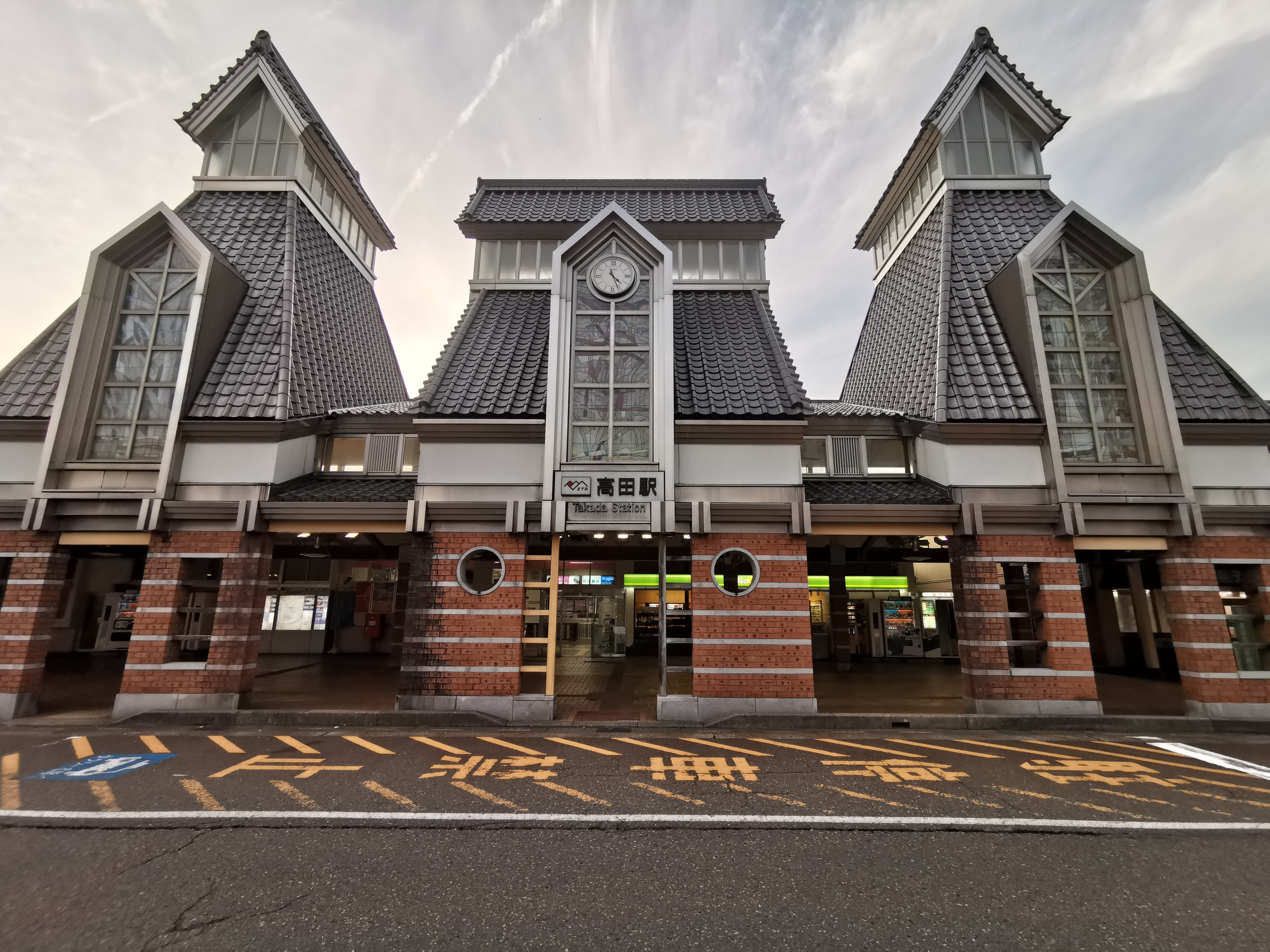
Takada Station, one of several locations in Jōetsu the series depicts

The story takes place in a fictional city in Japan called N-City. While writing the light novel, Asari Endō was thinking of his hometown Jōetsu in Niigata Prefecture. Several locations and landmarks in the series are modeled after locations in Jōetsu, including Takada Station and Takada Castle.

== Release ==
=== Broadcast ===
Magical Girl Raising Project was first announced on September 3, 2015. In March 2016, the official website was launched together with a promotional video that announced the series would premiere that year. The series premiered on Japanese television on October 2, 2016, and aired weekly for twelve episodes until concluding on December 18, 2016. (Note: Episodes aired every Saturday at 24:00 on TV Tokyo. Airing dates have been converted to Japan Standard Time (i.e., the following Sunday).) It first broadcast on AT-X, followed by Tokyo MX, BS-11, and GyaO!, and it was licensed for worldwide simulcast by Crunchyroll. An English dub of the series was produced by Funimation and aired in 2018.

=== Home media ===
A two-disc Blu-ray collection was released by Funimation on September 24, 2019. It includes the original Japanese stereo audio and the English dub in 5.1 audio. The video is in the original 1.78:1 aspect ratio in 1080p. In addition to the original episodes, the collection includes access to a digital version, all of the series promotional videos, and three holiday-themed greetings featuring the character Nemurin.

In his review for The Fandom Post, Chris Beveridge described the collection as solid and gave it a B+ rating. He praised the video and audio quality and said it was an enjoyable presentation.

== Themes and analysis ==
Anime News Network critics described the series as pushing gender boundaries within the magical girl genre with the character La Pucelle, a boy who loves magical girls and can transform into one like the rest of the main characters. Nick Creamer said the series touches on the difficulties young boys can face when liking magical girl aesthetics, praising the first episode for its depiction of the character, which allowed "the boy who liked magical girls to become one without a hint of judgment or mockery". Christopher Farris and Nicholas Dupree discussed the use of magical boys in the genre, and Dupree suggested darker magical girl media allows adult men to engage with magical girls in a culturally-acceptable way; Farris connected this view to La Pucelle's backstory and his love of magical girls.

While analyzing the magical girl genre, Akiko Sugawa-Shimada discussed the use of magical boys as a parody of traditional magical girl tropes, particularly in late-night anime. Sugawa sees magical boys as subverting this association by creating characters that are masculine despite appearing feminine, which can confuse the audience's perception of gender stereotypes. She uses La Pucelle as an example of how this parody can be used to challenge gender norms but remain constrained by them: in the sixth episode, La Pucelle expresses his desire to protect the protagonist Snow White, before being killed soon after. Sugawa argues that, because the genre is constrained by femininity and feminine power, this desire by La Pucelle is too masculine for a magical girl and "leads to his tragic death in the female homosocial space of mahō shōjo".

== Sequel ==
A week after the series finished airing, director Hashimoto said production of a sequel was undecided. He later recalled his desire to continue the story, but the financial prospects were unclear: "if there's no clear prospect of recouping the investment, it's difficult to move forward with making an anime".

During a celebration of the franchise's ten-year anniversary, a sequel series called Magical Girl Raising Project: Restart was announced. Several staff members from the first series returned for the sequel, including Hiroyuki Hashimoto as director and Takao Yoshioka as scriptwriter. The sequel adapts the second and third light novels and premiered October 6, 2026, on TV Tokyo.

== Reception ==
=== Previews ===
The anime adaptation's first episode garnered generally positive reviews from Anime News Network's staff during the Fall 2016 season previews. Paul Jensen saw potential in this being a good series, highlighting the early character setup of Koyuki and the mobile game mechanics being used as a possible critique of the "dark and bloody approach" that magical girl shows took in recent memory. Jacob Chapman criticized the "laughable tone obfuscation and pregnant pacing", and that viewers will be aware of where the series is heading towards but commended Koyuki for being a "generally likable" heroine and the stylishly diverse cast of magical girls, concluding that this Madoka Magica imitation carries potential entertainment value. Theron Martin praised the decent animation, character aesthetics and the perverse intrigue of a blood-soaked magical girl competition but criticized the producers for stringing viewers with said promise shown in the opening. Nick Creamer praised the thoughtful introduction of its ensemble cast, the "grounded but funny approach" it takes with magical girls and the solid production having consistent and colorful animation, saying it's an engaging start that has him hooked to follow more episodes. Rebecca Silverman saw the obvious influences to Madoka and was optimistic of the show moving towards similar series like Nurse Angel Ririka SOS and Kamikaze Kaitō Jeanne in later episodes but felt it will go into the "presumed subversion of making magical girls into a violent murderfest" foreshadowed in the opening.

=== Release ===
Fellow ANN editor Amy McNulty placed Magical Girl Raising Project at number two on her top 5 best anime list of 2016, praising the contrast of "primal brutality with the cutesy art style" and the various ways the female ensemble approach the grisly game, concluding that: "While the series largely gets by on spectacle and shock value, many of its key players—good and bad—are flawed, complex, and sympathetic, and their respective backstories and motivations run the gamut from 'downright silly' to 'genuinely moving.'" Martin reviewed the home video release in 2020 and gave it a B− grade, praising the magical girls for their varied outfits and diversity amongst its cast, the overall plot having decent story twists and action set pieces, but was critical of the tonal inconsistencies throughout the series.

Reviewing for Otaku USA, Brittany Vincent said she considered it a "must-watch if you’re interested in the darker side of magical girls". She praised the diversity of characters, noting several of the characters are not actually girls outside of their transformations. She further praised the art style and felt it reminiscent of "happy-go-lucky" magical girl works, arguing the style could lull the viewer into a false sense of security while watching.

Alex Henderson of Anime Feminist criticized the series in his critique of the dark magical girl subgenre. Henderson argued that the series takes the traditional genre core of inspiring and entertaining young girls and replaces it with murder, despair, and shock value, creating situations where "young animated girls in frilly outfits are essentially being made to suffer onscreen for an adult (often male) audience". They further argue the dark deconstruction subgenre popularized by Puella Magi Madoka Magica has become cliché, and they hope the genre goes back to its more optimistic roots.
