= Pay Money to My Pain =

Japanese rock band

Pay money To my Pain

Background information
- Also known as: P.T.P.
- Origin: Tokyo, Japan
- Genres: Alternative rock; alternative metal; post-hardcore; nu metal
- Years active: 2005–2013
- Label: VAP
- Members: Pablo; T$uyo$hi; Zax
- Past members: JIN; Kei Goto
- Website: paymoneytomypain.com

Pay Money to My Pain (stylized as Pay money To my Pain and abbreviated as P.T.P.) was a Japanese rock band. All of the band's lyrics are written in English.

== History ==
=== Formation and early years (2005–2007) ===
PTP was formed by bassist T$uyo$hi and guitarist Pablo after the two built up a friendship through their respective bands Drug Store Cowboy and Giraffe; deciding to start a project together, the two looked for a singer, discovering K from the then up-and-coming nu metal band Gun Dog. T$uyo$hi, knowing that K was committed to Gun Dog — who was about to release their debut album Humanity — sought out his acquaintance; when offered a chance to perform with Drug Store Cowboy, he invited K to sing for the one-off gig, who invited his childhood friend Jin as second guitarist. Inspired by the chemistry of the group, K quit Gun Dog to focus on the new project. Finally, Pablo recruited former classmate Zax as drummer.

K stated that his lyrics expressed his deepest pain and when fans bought the CDs, they were literally buying into his pain. Hence, Pay money To my Pain.

They began to produce songs independently before signing with the record label VAP. From there, they released their first major single, "Drop of Ink", on December 6, 2006.

=== Career and K's death (2007–2012) ===
Several months later, they went to California where they recorded their first album, Another Day Comes, which was released on September 12, 2007. The album included "Home", the ending theme for Buzzer Beater, and "Another Day Comes", the ending theme for Ultraseven X.

Jin left the band on April 6, 2008 over his worry that the rise of the band's popularity and the pressure coming with it would take its toll on K. On July 30, 2008, they released an EP titled Writing in the Diary.

The band's song "Bury", from the album After You Wake Up, was featured as the opening theme to the anime One Outs. One of their other songs, "The Answer is Not in the TV", was featured in the Konami video game Pro Evolution Soccer 2010.

On June 9, 2010, Pay Money to My Pain released the single Pictures, which is an EP and a DVD sold separately.

On January 26, 2011, Pay Money to My Pain released their third album, Remember the Name.

On August 10, 2011, the band performed alongside Lynch at a charity event, called "Shikiyakou -Shikui-", which was hosted by Dead End. All proceeds were donated to the victims of the 2011 Tōhoku earthquake and tsunami on March 11.

In June 2012, vocalist K was hospitalized. That summer, Pay Money to My Pain performed their live show "House of Chaos". They covered Buck-Tick's song "Love Letter" for Parade II -Respective Tracks of Buck-Tick-, which was released on July 4, 2012. In October, K was again hospitalized and went through rehabilitation; the band declared an activity stop. On December 30, 2012, K died of acute heart failure in his home in Yokohama at the age of 31.

=== After K's death (2013–2023) ===
On 20 September 2013, the band announced a new album called Gene, with songs that K had recorded before his death, as well as songs recorded with guest vocalists. The album, released on November 13, 2013, included "Rain", the theme song of the movie Sekisekirenren, "Innocent in a Silent Room" and a new version of "Sweetest Vengeance".

In December 2013, Pay money To my Pain played their last concert at Zepp Tokyo, entitled "From Here to Somewhere"; the band played as a three-piece with K's vocals played from a backing track. The concert concluded with the band announcing their final disbandment.

In January 2014, "Weight of my Pride" was featured in episode 12 of the anime series Hajime no Ippo: Rising. Their song "Respect for the Dead Man" was also used as the theme song for the Nobunagun anime, which began airing on January 5, 2014.

On December 29, 2014, a previously unreleased song named "Room #103", which has K on vocals, was uploaded to Pay money To my Pain's official YouTube channel.

On December 29, 2015, another previously unreleased song named "Relive", which has K on vocals, was uploaded to Pay money To my Pain's official YouTube channel.

On September 11, 2016, the band announced a limited edition box set entitled 10 Years from Drop of Ink including five CDs, two Blu-Rays, a 12" vinyl and various trinkets that would cover their entire career. The box set was slated for a December 6, 2016, release, ten years to the date of the release of their first major single, "Drop of Ink".

On February 2, 2020, Pay money To my Pain performed on the second day of "BLARE FEST. 2020" hosted by Coldrain. On this memorable day, PTP played "Ligarse", "Resurrection" (feat. Masato from coldrain & Hazuki from lynch.), "Weight of my pride" (feat. MAH from SiM), "Respect for the dead man" (feat. Koie, Teru from Crossfaith, NOBUYA, N∀OKI from ROTTENGRAFFTY), "PICTURES" (feat. Yosh from Survive Said The Prophet, AG from NOISEMAKER), "Voice" (feat. Taka from ONE OK ROCK), "Rain", and "This Life".

On November 17, 2023, a documentary titled Sunrise to Sunset was released in Japan, paying tribute to the band; the documentary's second half is a concert film of the band's Blare Fest appearance.

== Members ==
- K – vocals
  - Kei Gotō (後藤慶), also known as his stage name K. On January 10, 2013, Pay Money to My Pain announced that K had died on December 30, 2012, at age 31 due to acute heart failure at his home in Yokohama.
- JIN – guitar
  - Jin left the band in 2008 and is currently the vocalist High Speed Boyz. He has also produced for groups such as Greeeen, the band of his brother Hide, and Bareeeeeeeeeen, the combination group of Greeeen and Back-On.
- PABLO – guitar
  - Pablo is a Hispanic-Japanese guitarist and is a support guitarist for LiSA, Fake?, Oblivion Dust and Takui Nakajima.
- T$UYO$HI – bass
  - T$UYO$HI now plays bass in the band THE BONEZ.
- ZAX – drums
  - ZAX now plays drums in the band THE BONEZ, and joined Hi-Standard in September 2025.

== Discography ==
Albums

- Another Day Comes (September 12, 2007)
- After You Wake Up (March 18, 2009)
- Remember the Name (January 26, 2011)
- Gene (November 13, 2013)

Greatest hits

- Breakfast (October 24, 2012)

Extended plays

- Drop of Ink (December 6, 2006)
- Writing in the Diary (July 30, 2008)
- Pictures (June 9, 2010)

Digital singles

- "All Because of You" (August 27, 2008)
- "Bury" (January 7, 2009) – the opening theme for the One Outs anime

Box sets

- 10 Years from Drop of Ink (December 6, 2016)

Compilations

- Buzzer Beater Original Soundtrack (September 20, 2007) - "Home-TV Size Version-"
- Ultra Seven X Original Soundtrack (October 24, 2007) - "Another Day Comes [TV Size]"
- One Outs Original Soundtrack (January 21, 2009) - "Bury (TV Size)"
- Parade II -Respective Tracks of Buck-Tick- (July 7, 2012) - "Love Letter" (Buck-Tick cover)
- Immortality (March 22, 2013) - "Weight of my pride (Devilock Night the Final live version)"
- Shinjuku Swan Inspired Tracks Selected by Tatsuhiko Shirojima (May 27, 2015) - "Sweetest vengeance"

== Videography ==
"Drop of Ink"

1. "Black Sheep"
2. "From Here to Somewhere"

"Another Day Comes"

1. "Another Day Comes"
2. "Paralyzed Ocean"

"Writing in the Diary"

1. "Out of My Hands"
2. "All Because of You"

"After You Wake Up"

1. "The Answer is Not in the TV'"
2. "Same As You Are"

"Pictures"

1. "Pictures"

"Remember the Name"

1. "Greed"
2. "Deprogrammer"
3. "Weight of My Pride (Live)"

"Breakfast"

1. "Sweetest Vengeance"

"Gene"

1. "Rain"
