= Nano (singer) =

Japanese-American singer

- Born: July 12; New York City, U.S
- Origin: New York City, U.S
- Genres: J-pop; anison; rock
- Occupations: Singer; lyricist
- Instruments: Vocals; guitar
- Years active: 2006–present
- Label: Flying Dog
- Website: www.nanonano.me

Nano (ナノ; stylized as nano), is a Japanese-American singer and lyricist managed by HoriPro and signed to the Flying Dog label. Born in New York City, Nano sings in both Japanese and English. Nano posted music on YouTube and Niconico before being signed by a record label.

== Biography ==
Nano was born on July 12, in New York City. She was raised in the United States as a child but then moved to Japan when she was fourteen.

Nano posted covers of Vocaloid and anime songs online, first on YouTube and later on the Japanese site Niconico. She is bilingual, and sometimes wrote English lyrics to the cover songs, giving them a Western touch without losing the original style. Eventually, this led to a record deal with Japanese major label Flying Dog. Her debut album Nanoir was released on March 14, 2012. Nano's first live performance was on March 16, 2013.

Nano has recorded several original theme songs for various anime series, such as, "Bull's Eye" for Hidan no Aria, "Now or Never" for Phi Brain: Puzzle of God, "No Pain, No Game" and "Exist" for Btooom!, "Savior of Song" (feat. My First Story) for Arpeggio of Blue Steel, "Born To Be" for Magical Warfare, "Sable" for M3 the dark metal, "Got the grip" produced by TeddyLoid and featuring NANO for New Panty & Stocking with Garterbelt second season's soundtrack, "Dreamcatcher" for Magical Girl Raising Project, "Rock On." for the first film of Arpeggio of Blue Steel, Arpeggio of Blue Steel: Ars Nova DC, “Star Light, Star Bright” for Conception, and "Kemurikusa" for Kemurikusa. "No Pain, No Game" was certified gold by the Recording Industry Association of Japan.

Some of Nano's other commercially featured works include:

- "Destiny: 12 Kaime no Kiseki" as the opening of the PlayStation Portable game Conception: Ore no Kodomo o Undekure!.
- "Silence" as the theme song of the Japanese horror channel Den Of Horror: Horror no Sokutsu!
- "Happy Ending Simulator" as the theme song of the arcade game Gunslinger Stratos 2.
- "Scarlet Story" as the theme song for the Japanese TV puppet show Sherlock Holmes.
- "Infinity≠Zero" as the theme song for the Japanese live action film Bakumatsu Kokosei.
- "Paralyze:D" as the theme song of the PlayStation Vita game Re:Vice[D].
- "Identity Crisis" and "Restart" for the video game Warriors Orochi.
- "Mirror, Mirror" for the PlayStation Vita game Bad Apple Wars.
- "Dare Devil" for the mobile phone game "Houkago Girls Tribe."
- "Nevereverland" as the theme song for the anime OVA Ark IX.
- "INFERNO" as the theme song of Gira Husty from the Japanese tokusatsu television drama Ohsama Sentai King-Ohger.

== Discography ==
=== Albums ===
==== Studio albums ====
Year	Information	Oricon peak position
2012	Nanoir: Released: March 14, 2012	12
2013	N: Released: February 27, 2013	8
2015	Rock On.: Released: January 28, 2015	6
2017	The Crossing: Released: May 31, 2017	20
2020	I: Released: March 18, 2020	58
2023	NOIXE: Released: February 8, 2023	—

==== EPs ====
Year	Information	Oricon peak position
2021	ANTHESIS: Released: April 15, 2021	74
2025	aИomaly: Released: July 2, 2025	—

==== Live albums ====
Year	Information	Oricon peak position
2013	Remember your Color.: Released: June 5, 2013	24

==== Remix albums ====
Year	Information	Oricon peak position
2016	Nano's Remixes: Released: July 13, 2016	50

=== Singles ===
Year	Information	Oricon peak position	Billboard Japan Hot 100	Album
2012	"Now or Never": Released: May 23, 2012	25	93	N
2012	"No Pain, No Game": Released: October 10, 2012	11	—	N
2013	"Nevereverland": Released: April 6, 2013	—	—	N
2013	"SAVIOR OF SONG": Released: October 30, 2013	10	—	Rock on.
2014	"Born to Be": Released: February 19, 2014	19	36	Rock on.
2014	"INFINITY≠ZERO / SABLE": Released: July 23, 2014	31	67	Rock on.
2015	"Bull's Eye": Released: October 28, 2015	29	—	The Crossing
2016	"DREAMCATCHER": Released: November 2, 2016	45	—	The Crossing
2017	"MY LIBERATION / PARAISO": Released: February 2, 2017	33	—	The Crossing
2018	"Utsushiyo no Yume (nano ver.)": Released: August 22, 2018	73	—	I
2018	"Star light, Star bright": Released: November 21, 2018	77	—	I
2019	"Kemurikusa": Released: February 6, 2019	49		I
"—" denotes releases that did not chart.
