= My First Story =

Japanese rock band

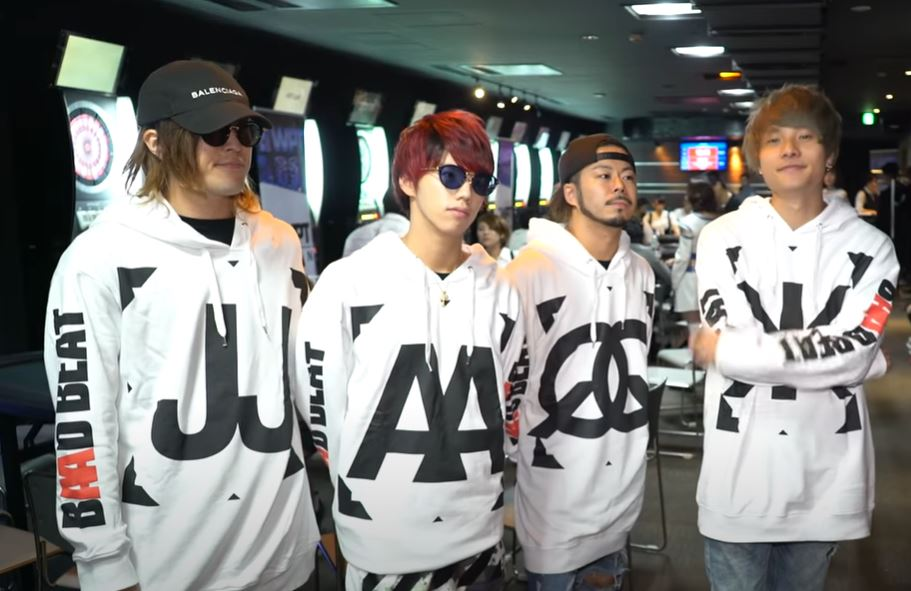
- My First Story in 2018

Background information
- Origin: Shibuya, Tokyo, Japan
- Genres: Post-hardcore; alternative rock
- Years active: 2011–present
- Label: Intact Records
- Members: Hiroki "Hiro" Moriuchi; Nobuaki "Nob" Katō; Teruki "Teru" Nishizawa; Shōhei "Kid'z" Sasaki
- Past members: Masaki "Masack" Kojima; Sho Tsuchiya
- Website: www.myfirststory.net

My First Story (マイ・ファースト・ストーリー、マイファス、MFS, stylized in all caps) is a Japanese rock band from Shibuya, Tokyo. Formed in 2011, the band currently consists of vocalist Hiroki Moriuchi, guitarist Teruki Nishizawa, bassist Nobuaki Katō, and drummer Shōhei Sasaki. Their debut album My First Story (2012) caught people's attention and put them in lineups of major music festivals. Their fourth studio album Antithese (2016) ranked 4th on Oricon chart, and directed their first Nippon Budokan live show, gathering 12,000.

== History ==
=== 2011–2012: Formation and earlier days ===
Having known Hiro through Pay Money to My Pain's vocalist K, producer Nori Outani suggested him to Sho in August 2011, when he was still mainly active in his previous band Fromus together with drummer Masack and bassist Nob. Only a little later, the newly founded formation decided to add another guitarist and Hiro remembered Teru who he had already tried to start a band with in their high school days. Their band name "My First Story" had been suggested by Pay Money to My Pain vocalist K.

In October 2011, they appeared in a music event sponsored by Sanei Shobo Co., which publishes the street fashion magazine Book (Ohlie), and performed in public for the first time. In November 2011, they appeared in a music event sponsored by the street fashion brand Subciety (Sub-society).

On April 4, 2012, eight months after the formation, they released their first full album, self-titled My First Story, that by 2013 had already sold 20,000 copies. This work was the first release from the record label Intact Records (established by Core Trust which operates Subciety). The music video of the lead song "Second Limit" was directed by Maxilla, a video production team known for coldrain, Crossfaith, and SiM. The band's first independent show, "Highest Life Party Vol. 1", held in June sold out immediately. On August 19, 2012, they appeared at the Summer Sonic Festival.

=== 2013–2015: Japan tours and The Story is My Life and Itsuwari Neurose ===
On February 6, 2013, the second album The Story is My Life released. After the release, the band supported All Time Low on their Japan tour, followed by their own tour "The Story Is My Life", which sold out at every venue. They appeared in several music festivals such as Punkspring, Rock in Japan Festival, Summer Sonic Festival, and many more.

The band joined Swanky Dank, Blue Encount and Air Swell, 3 other indie bands, to make a split album project, titled Boneds in the beginning of 2014. In conjunction with the album release, the 4 bands held a nationwide Boneds tour and an accompanying documentary & DVD of the tour released later that year in April.

On February 5, 2014, the first live DVD The End of the Beginning Tour Final Oneman Show at Ebisu Liquidroom released. In June, the band held a duo live with nano, "Highest Life Party Vol. 4 & United We Rock On", who collaborated with the band for her single "Savior of Song".

On July 16, the second single "Black Rail" released.

On September 24, the third single "Fukyagaku Replace" (不可逆リプレイス, Fukagyaku Ripureisu) released. The song was used as the ending theme for the anime Nobunaga Concerto.

On October 29, 2014, the band's third album Itsuwari Neurose (虚言 Neurose) was released, including the song "Someday" that was written as a tribute song to K who died in December 2012. The album ranked number 14 on the Oricon charts. The Itsuwari Neurose tour was held over 2 months, with the final at Shinkiba Studio Coast. Several shows had to be postponed due to vocalist Hiro and drummer Masack becoming sick with influenza.

In May through June 2015, the band appeared on a tour with fellow Intact Records labelmates, titled "My First Story vs Another Story".

On May 27, the second live DVD Itsuwari Neurose Tour Final at Shinkiba Studio Coast released.

On August 5, the fourth single "Alone" released. The single was made in collaboration with Project Hal and used in a TVCM for it.

=== 2015–2016: Antithese and "We're Just Waiting 4 You" ===
In October 2015, guitarist and leader Sho announced he'd go on hiatus due to personal circumstances. On December 2, Sho performed in his last oneman show before his hiatus. The live, "We Are Not Alone – Sho Time !!-", was dedicated to him. During Sho's last performance with the band at Countdown Japan 15/16, vocalist Hiro started to cry as he informed the audience about it being their last 5-men-show before Sho would leave for his hiatus. Despite his absence onstage with his band members, Sho remains present in My First Story's following albums, credited as composer or sound producer.

In January 2016, the band members all deleted their public Twitter and Instagram accounts before launching their Official Member's Club "Storyteller" on January 8.

On March 3, 2016, the drummer Masack announced withdrawal. Kid'z (ex. Shohei) of the band Loth who broke up in November 2015, joined as a new drummer after he had already been friends with Hiro and Teru. After Sho's suspension of activity and Masack's withdrawal, the first live performance with that new band constellation, "Highest Life Party Vol. 5" was held at Shibuya O-East on March 10, 2016. There the band announced they would conduct their 47 prefecture one-man tour "We're Just Waiting 4 You Tour 2016" and release their 4th full-length album in summer 2016.

On May 4, 2016, they appeared on Japan Jam Beach 2016.

On June 29, 2016, their fourth album Antithese was released, reaching number 4 on the Oricon charts which was the band's highest spot on Oricon for an album so far. From June to October 2016 they toured all 47 prefectures of Japan for their "We're Just Waiting 4 You" Tour, and held their tour final at Nippon Budokan on November 18, 2016, accompanied by the release of the limited single "We're Just Waiting 4 You" that was sold at the venue only. The single included the two songs "We're Just Waiting 4 You", written for Sho who had announced his hiatus in 2015, and "Take My Hand". At Budokan, the band performed a setlist consisting of 28 songs in total, including every song from their latest album Antithese, as well as the newly released single "We're Just Waiting 4 You" that they played together with Sho who joined them onstage for encore. Before finishing off their setlist, Hiro announced the last song, "Home", would be performed at Budokan that night for the first and last time.

=== 2016–2017: All Lead/Secret Tracks and "MMA" ===
The We're Just Waiting 4 You Tour 2016 Final at Budokan DVD was released on April 12, 2017 and reached number 4 on the Oricon charts.

In February, the first documentary movie My First Story Documentary Film -全心- screened nationwide through Toho cinemas.

On June 12, 2017, they announced their "MMA" Tour 2017. The tour covered 17 shows from September to November 2017 and would have its final one man show "The Premium Symphony" at Makuhari Messe on December 23, 2017. The band never clarified what MMA stood for. The tour sold out.

On June 21, 2017, My First Story released their Documentary Film ―全心― (Zenshin) that tells the story of the band from the creation up until Budokan, looking at the evolution and hardships they faced while following them for their "We're Just Waiting 4 You Tour 2016".

On July 19, 2017, the band released their fifth album, All Lead Tracks that came in 4 different versions: Regular version with 5 tracks, limited version with a bonus track featuring UK from MOROHA, an Amazon version that came with an illustration of vocalist Hiro, and the Storyteller version that included a DVD. The album's track "Let It Die" was used for the soundtrack of the eponymous PS4 game Let It Die, "Reviver" was part of the soundtrack for the Hortensia Saga: Ao no Kishidan, "Though being the happiest person in this world is something I may not be able to do..." (この世界で一番の幸せ者にはする事など出来ないかもしれないけど..., kono sekai de ichiban no shiawase-sha ni suru koto nado dekinai kamoshirenai kedo...) served as theme song for the Japanese TV-show Buzz Rhythm, "Smash Out!!" was used for Shinjuku Swan II and "The Storyteller" was chosen as the theme song for the band's documentary film ―全心― (Zenshin).

In the same year, on December 12, the band released their sixth album entitled All Secret Tracks. The album contains 6 tracks including the cover of "See You Again" and the song "Overcoming the Night Without You" (君のいない夜を越えて, Kimi No Inai Yoru O Koete) which was used as the theme song of Ochanomizu Rock. Fans guessed that while All Lead Tracks was named after the fact that every track was used for another project, All Secret Tracks may have received its name because there had been no release announcements on the part of staff and band, and the CD itself did not come with any song lyrics either.

On December 23, 2017, My First Story held their "MMA" Tour Final "The Premium Symphony" at Makuhari Messe in front of 18,000 people and performed 23 or their songs together with a live orchestra and choir. Another limited single, "Merry Christmas" was released that day and sold at the venue only. Apart from the title song "Merry Christmas", the CD also included an acoustic version of "Fukagyaku Replace".

=== 2017–2018: S•S•S ===
On January 25, 2018, the band announced a new CD titled The Premium Symphony. It contains eight previously released songs, rearranged with a full orchestra. The CD released March 28, 2018.

On March 16, the band was announced to open for Fall Out Boy's MANIA Tour in Nippon Budokan, Tokyo on April 26.

On March 23, the DVD of "MMA" Tour 2017 Final One Man Show "The Premium Symphony" was announced to release on May 23. In addition to the regular DVD, a special VR set was sold through WIZY and includes original My First Story VR goggles plus 3 songs specially recorded for VR viewing. Another special that came with "The Premium Symphony" was a second DVD including bassist Nob's one man show ~This is Truly Alone~ (〜これがホントの Alone や〜, ~Kore ga honto no Alone ya~) that was held on March 7, 2018 at Tsutaya O-East, Tokyo. The limited bundle was only available for pre-order until April 15.

=== 2019–2021: V ===
The band's single "Mukoku", originally scheduled for release on July 31, 2019, was pushed back to August 14 in order to remove the track "Underdog" which featured a collaboration with Rize and The Bonez vocalist Jesse who had been arrested for marijuana possession.

The band's single, "1,000,000 Times", was released on July 1 in Japan featuring Chelly from Egoist and including a track called "Minors".

=== 2022–present: X and The Crown ===
To commemorate the band's 10th anniversary, My First Story released their best album X on August 24, 2022, containing 17 songs including new song "Memories". The album charted at number six on both Oricon Albums Chart and Billboard Japan Hot Albums. On November 14, 2023, My First Story and One Ok Rock held a one-night-only live show "VS" at Tokyo Dome.

In 2024, the band performed the opening and ending theme songs, "Mugen" (Dreams) and "Tokoshie" (Eternity) with Hyde, for the fourth season of the anime Demon Slayer: Kimetsu no Yaiba.

== Band members ==
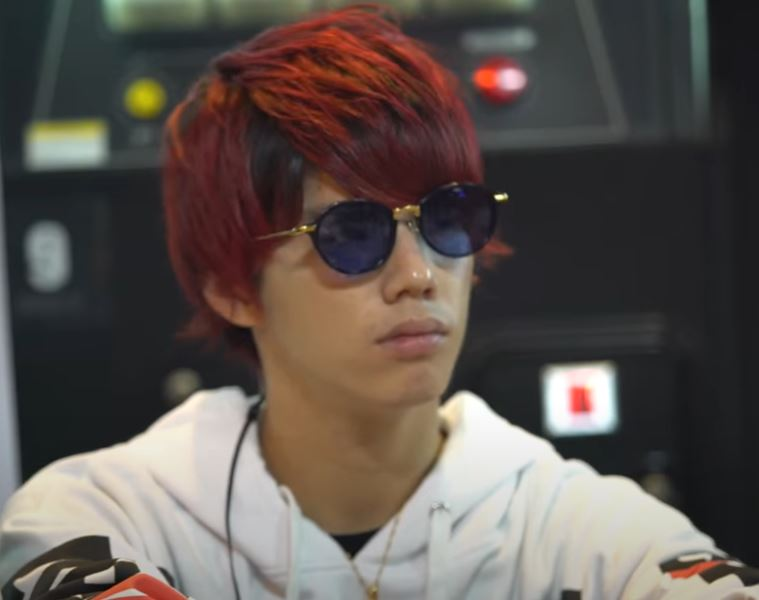
Hiro

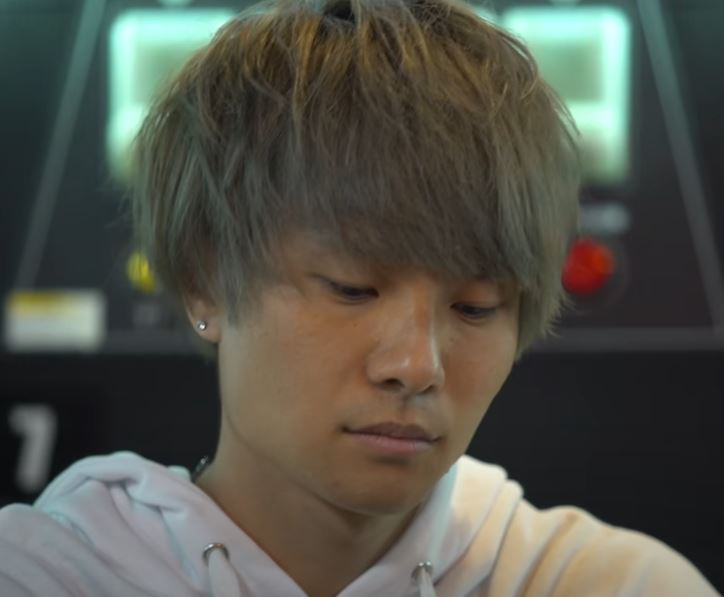
Kid'z

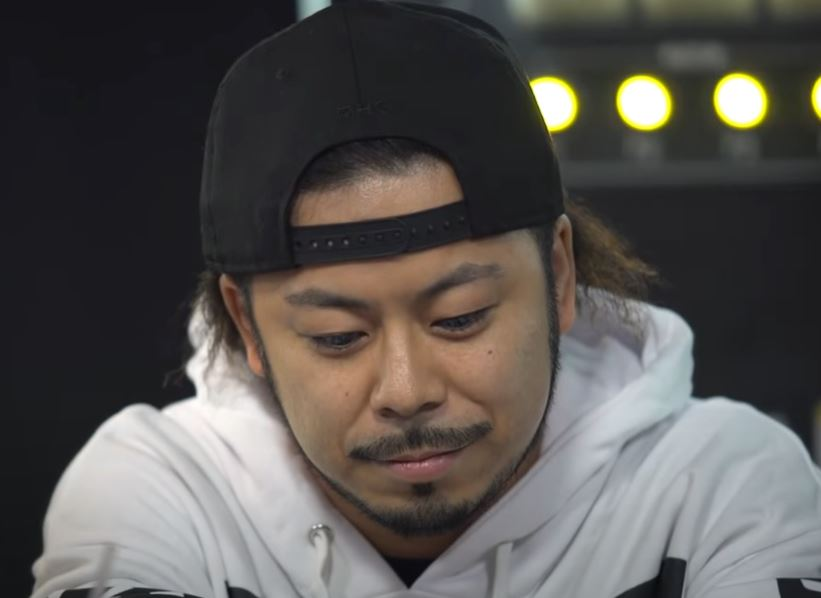
Nob

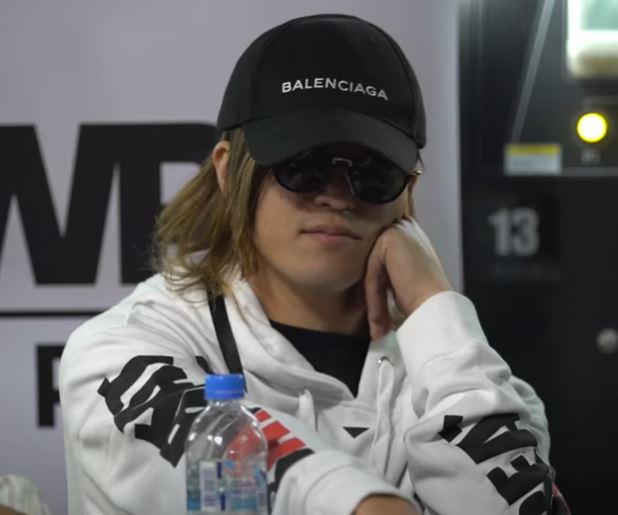
Teru

Current

- Hiroki "Hiro" Moriuchi (森内 寛樹, Moriuchi Hiroki) — lead vocals (2011–present)
- Nobuaki "Nob" Katō (加藤 伸明, Katō Nobuaki) — bass guitar (2011–present)
- Teruki "Teru" Nishizawa (西澤 照貴, Nishizawa Teruki) — guitar (2011–present)
- Shōhei "Kid'z" Sasaki (佐々木 翔平, Sasaki Shōhei) — drums (2016–present)

Former

- Shō Tsuchiya (土屋 翔, Tsuchiya Shō) — lead guitar (2011–2015), leader
- Masaki "Masack" Kojima (Kojima Masaki) — drums (2011–2016)

Timeline

== Discography ==
My First Story discography
- Studio albums: 7
- Compilation albums: 7
- Singles: 29

=== Studio albums ===
Title	Album details	Peak positions		Sales
Title	Album details	JPN	JPN Hot	Sales
My First Story	Released: April 4, 2012; Label: Intact Records; Formats: CD, digital download	26	—	—N/a
The Story Is My Life	Released: February 6, 2013; Label: Intact Records; Formats: CD, digital download	15	—	—N/a
Kyogen Neurose (虚言 Neurose)	Released: October 29, 2014; Label: Intact Records; Formats: CD, digital download	14	—	—N/a
Antithese	Released: June 29, 2016; Label: Intact Records; Formats: CD, digital download	4	7	JPN: 18,924
S·S·S	Released: October 17, 2018; Label: Intact Records; Formats: CD, digital download	4	7	JPN: 18,723
V	Released: August 12, 2020; Label: Intact Records; Formats: CD, digital download	2	3	—N/a
The Crown	Released: May 8, 2024; Label: Intact Records; Formats: CD, digital download	12	10	JPN: 3,581

=== Compilation albums ===
Title	Album details	Peak positions		Sales
Title	Album details	JPN	JPN Hot	Sales
All Lead Tracks	Released: July 19, 2017; Label: Intact Records; Formats: CD, digital download	6	12	—N/a
All Secret Tracks	Released: December 13, 2017; Label: Intact Records; Formats: CD, digital download	22	15	—N/a
The Premium Symphony	Released: March 28, 2018; Label: Intact Records; Formats: CD, digital download	24	31	—N/a
The Plugless	Released: July 3, 2019; Label: Intact Records; Formats: CD, digital download	20	18	—N/a
Sleeping	Released: July 8, 2020; Label: Intact Records; Formats: CD, digital download	—	31	—N/a
BGM	Released: July 8, 2020; Label: Intact Records; Formats: CD, digital download	—	33	—N/a
X	Released: August 24, 2022; Label: Intact Records; Formats: CD, digital download	6	6	JPN: 5,774

=== Singles ===
List of singles, showing year released, selected chart positions, and name of the album
Title	Year	Peak chart positions		Sales	Certifications	Album
Title	Year	JPN	JPN Hot	Sales	Certifications	Album
"Saishūkai Story" (最終回STORY)	2013	15	51			Non-album single
"Black Rail"	2014	18	76			Kyogen Neurose
"Fukyagaku Replace" (不可逆リプレイス)	2014	15	47			Antithese
"Alone"	2015	5	32			Antithese
"We're Just Waiting 4 You" (Note: Limited single released on November 18, 2016, available only at "We're Just Waiting 4 You Tour 2016 Final at Budokan" venue.)	2016	—	—			Non-album singles
"Merry Christmas" (Note: Limited single released on December 23, 2017, available only at "MMA Tour Final at Makuhari Messe" venue.)	2017	—	—			Non-album singles
"Accident"	2018	15	60			S·S·S
"Mukoku" (無告)	2019	16	63			V
"Identity" (アイデンティティー)	2019	—	88			Non-album single
"1,000,000 Times" (featuring Chelly of Egoist)	2020	8	45			V
"Leader"	2021	—	—			Non-album singles
"Kokuhaku" (告白)	2021	22	—			Non-album singles
"I'm a Mess"	2021	—	8			X
"Paradox"	2021	—	—			X
"Memories"	2022	—	—			X
"Two Billion Light-Year Love" (二十億光年の恋)	2023	—	—			The Crown
"Listen"	2023	—	—			The Crown
"Halzion" (ハルジオン)	2023	—	—			The Crown
"Ambience" (アンビシャス)	2023	—	—			The Crown
"Tokyo Midnight" (東京ミッドナイト)	2023	—	—			The Crown
"Merry Go Round" (メリーゴーラン)	2023	—	—			The Crown
"Crazy Beautiful Night"	2023	—	—			The Crown
"I Don't Wanna Be"	2023	—	—			The Crown
"Mirage" (蜃気楼)	2023	—	—			The Crown
"Ashen"	2023	—	—			The Crown
"Boyfriend"	2023	—	—			The Crown
"Mugen" (夢幻) (with Hyde)	2024	6	6	JPN: 70,505 (dig.); JPN: 18,862 (phy.) (Note: A combined single with "Mugen" and "Tokoshie")	RIAJ: Platinum (st.)	Non-album singles
"Tokoshie" (トコシエ) (with Hyde)	2024	6	—	JPN: 17,492 (dig.)		Non-album singles
"Akuma" (アクマ)	2024	—	— (Note: "Akuma" did not enter the Japan Hot 100 Chart, but debuted and peaked at number 21 on the component Download Chart.)	JPN: 1,417 (dig.)		Non-album singles
"—" denotes releases that did not chart or were not released in that region.

=== DVD / Blu-ray ===
Title	Details	Peak positions
Title	Details	JPN
The Ending of the Beginning Tour Final one man show at Ebisu Liquidroom	Released: February 5, 2014; Label: Intact Records; Format: DVD	7
Boneds Tour Movie	Released: May 21, 2014; Label: Intact Records; Format: DVD	24
Itsuwari Neurose Tour Final at Shinkiba Studio Coast	Released: May 27, 2015; Label: Intact Records; Formats: Digital download, DVD	6
We're Just Waiting 4 You Tour 2016 Final at Budokan	Released: April 12, 2017; Label: Intact Records; Formats: BD, DVD	13 (BD); 4 (DVD)
虚言NOBROSE Special (Kyogen NOBROSE Special)	Released: April 12, 2017; Label: Intact Records; Format: DVD	10
My First Story Documentary Film ―全心― (My First Story Documentary Film -Zenshin-)	Released: June 21, 2017; Label: Toho; Formats: BD, digital download, DVD	25 (BD); 23 (DVD)
"MMA" Tour 2017 Final One Man Show ”The Premium Symphony	Released: May 23, 2018; Label: Intact Records; Format: DVD	5

=== Covers ===
Year	Song	Original artist	Performer	Released on
2014	"We Are Never Ever Getting Back Together"	Taylor Swift	My First Story	"Fukyagaku Replace" (不可逆リプレイス) single
2017	"See You Again"	Wiz Khalifa (featuring Charlie Puth)	Hiro	JMSTV1 Official YouTube channel; All Secret Tracks album
2018	"Mikazuki" (ミカヅキ)	Sayuri	Hiro	"Dawn" (レイメイ Reimei) single

== Media appearances ==
Year	Song	Appearance
2014	"Fukyagaku Replace"	The ending theme for the anime Nobunaga Concerto.
2015	"Alone"	HAL (Japan Vocational School) commercial song.
2017	"Smash Out!!"	Shinjuku Swan II movie.
2017	"Reviver"	SEGA game Hortensia Saga: Ao no Kishidan theme song.; Japanese TV series Sukkiri!! theme song for June 2017
2017	"この世界で一番の幸せ者にはする事など出来ないかもしれないけど…" (I may not be able to do the best happiest person in this world, but ...)	Japanese TV series Buzzurism ending theme in July 2017
2017	"Let It Die"	Let It Die PS4 game song.
2018	"Reimei" (with Sayuri)	Opening song for anime Golden Kamuy Season 2.
2019	"King & Ashley"	Opening song for anime Kengan Ashura.
2021	"LEADER"	Opening song for anime Hortensia Saga
2021	"PARADOX"	Song inspired by The Matrix Resurrections
2024	"Mugen" (with Hyde)	Opening song for anime Demon Slayer: Kimetsu no Yaiba Season 4.
2024	"Tokoshie" (with Hyde)	Ending song for anime Demon Slayer: Kimetsu no Yaiba Season 4.

== Music videos ==
=== Official music videos ===
Year	Song	Director(s)
2012	"Second Limit"	Maxilla
2012	"Take it Back!!"	Kimura Kazuaki
2013	"The Story Is My Life"	Maxilla
2013	"The Reason"	Unknown
2013	"Saishūkai Story" (最終回Story The Last Round Story)	Maxilla
2014	"Fake"	Kanaria
2014	"Black Rail"	Kanaria
2014	"Fukyagaku Replace" (不可逆リプレイス Fukyagaku Ripureisu)	Kanaria
2014	"Kyogen Neurose" (虚言 Neurose)	Kanaria
2014	"Someday"	Kanaria
2015	"Child-error"	Kanaria
2015	"Shissō Flame" (失踪Flame Disappearance Flame)	Kei Ikeda
2015	"Alone"	Kei Ikeda
2016	"Missing You"	Kei Ikeda
2016	"Last Call"	Unknown
2017	"Reviver"	Unknown
2017	"Let It Die"	Unknown
2018	"Accident (Trailer)"	Unknown
2018	"Winner"	Unknown
2019	"Mukoku" (無告 Helpless)	Unknown

=== Featured music videos ===
Year	Song	Album	Artist	Notes
2013	"Savior of Song" (featuring My First Story)	Rock on.	nano	Opening theme song of anime series Arpeggio of Blue Steel.
2014	"Sink Like a Stone" (featuring Hiro)	Circles	Swanky Dank	
2018	"Dawn" (レイメイ Reimei) (with My First Story)	Non-album single	Sayuri	Opening song for anime Golden Kamuy Season 2.

== Awards and nominations ==
Year	Award show	Award	Nominee/work	Result	Ref.
2015	MTV Video Music Awards Japan	Next Break Artist	My First Story	Nominated	
2023	Japan Record Awards	Best Lyricist Award	"I'm a Mess" (lyrics by Hiro)	Won	

== Tours and festivals ==
=== Supporting act ===
- All Time Low Japan Tour (2013)
- Fall Out Boy "Mania Tour" with My First Story as supporting act (2018)

=== Festival performances ===
- Summer Sonic (2012)
- Punkspring (2013)
- Rock in Japan Festival (2013)
- Summer Sonic (2013)
- Rock in Japan Festival (2014)
