= Nightshift Superstar =

Single by Muse

from the album The Wow! Signal
- Released: 5 June 2026
- Genre: Disco; French house; electronic rock
- Length: 4:07
- Label: Warner; Helium 3
- Songwriters: Matt Bellamy; Dominic Howard; Chris Wolstenholme; Dan Lancaster
- Producers: Muse; Lancaster; Aleks Von Korff (add.); BloodPop (add.)

Muse singles chronology
"Hexagons" (2026)	"Nightshift Superstar" (2026)	"Hush" (2026)

"Nightshift Superstar" is a song by the English rock band Muse, released through Warner Records on 5 June 2026 as the fifth single from their tenth studio album, The Wow! Signal. It was the last to be released before the rest of the album. It was produced the band, Dan Lancaster and Aleks von Korff.

== Composition and lyrics ==
"Nightshift Superstar" is the second track on The Wow! Signal. Drawing on disco and French house influences, it combines funk-driven rhythms with guitar work, synthesisers, choral arrangements, and orchestral elements. The AU Review noted the prominence of Matt Bellamy's falsetto, blending with modulated harmonies and a choral passage featuring children's voices, while Chris Wolstenholme's bass line, which incorporates slap bass, is placed prominently. NME said the song captured a "sci-fi landscape" consistent with the broader themes of the album. Lyrically, the song was penned by Bellamy as a tribute to the early years of his relationship with his former partner Elle Evans, whom he described as a "real party girl".

== Release ==
"Nightshift Superstar" was released on 5 June 2026, accompanied by a music video. It is the fifth single from The Wow! Signal, following "Unravelling" (2025), and "Be with You", "Cryogen", and "Hexagons" (all 2026). The single's release coincided with the announcement of a North American amphitheatre tour, scheduled to run from July to August 2026.

== Critical reception ==
Radio X highlighted the dancefloor appeal and its incorporation of French house elements. Kerrang! characterised it as a disco-rock track with a futuristic sensibility. XS Noize praised the combination of Muse's rock sound with funk and French house influences. The AU Review commended Wolstenholme's bass work in particular, and argued that the single demonstrates Muse's continued ability to surprise listeners ten albums into their career.

Liam Inscoe-Jones of Pitchfork said "Nightshift Superstar" was "torturous" and the worst track on The Wow! Signal. He described it as "a tune indebted to the Timberlake-blessed whomps that represent the nadir of Timbaland's career. The pure, post-Bee Gees charisma Bellamy mustered in the 2000s seems to have vacated him entirely, and the song's funkiness suffocates under the flatness of his delivery."

== Charts ==
Chart performance for "Nightshift Superstar"
Chart (2026)	Peak position
Belgium (Ultratop 50 Wallonia)	49
Bolivia Anglo Airplay (Monitor Latino)	11
UK Singles Sales (OCC)	61
