= One Ok Rock videography =

ONE OK ROCK video discography
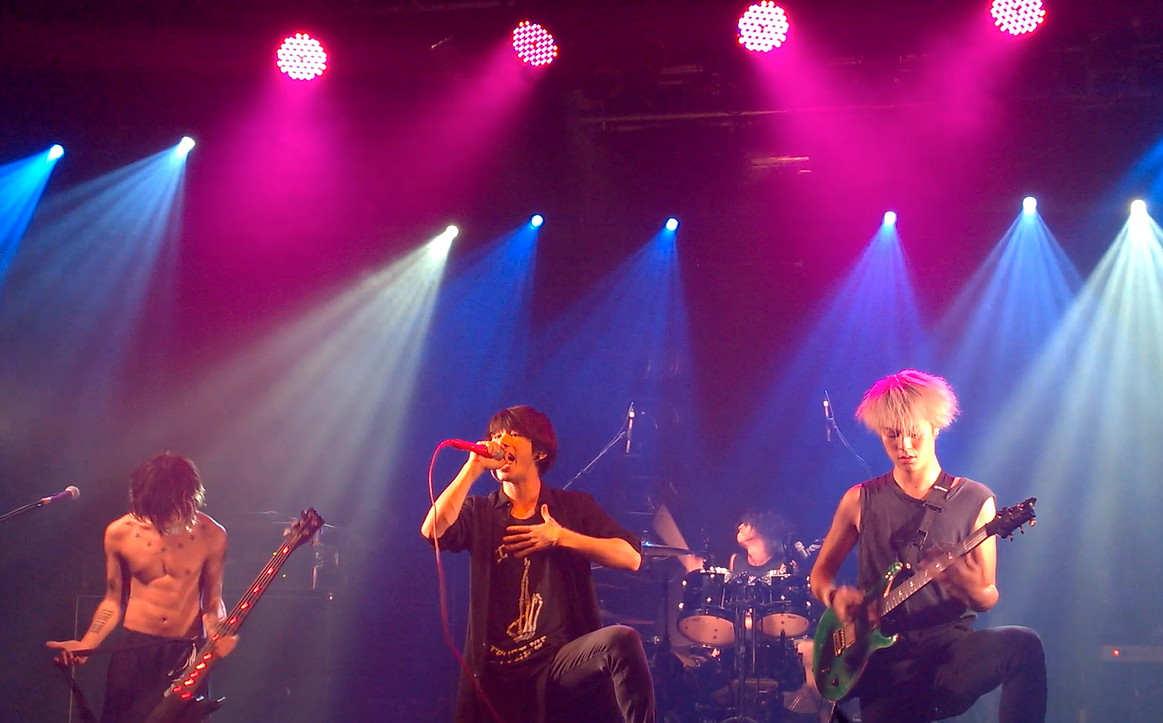
- ONE OK ROCK performing in London, 2014.
- Music videos: 35
- Video albums: 14
- Films: 2
- Television: 4

Japanese rock band ONE OK ROCK has released thirty-five music videos and fourteen video albums. The band and its music have also appeared in various television shows, commercials, and films.

== Music videos ==
List of music videos, showing year released and director
Title	Year	Director(s)	Notes	Ref.
"Moshimo Taiyou Ga Nakunatta Toshitara" ("もしも太陽がなくなったとしたら")	2006	Unknown		
"Keep it real"	2006	Unknown		
"Naihi Shinsho" ("内秘心書")	2007	Hideaki Fukui		
"Yume Yume" ("努努ーゆめゆめー")	2007	Junya Matsuyama		
"Etcetera" ("エトセトラ")	2007	Nobuaki Hongo		
"Hitsuzen Maker" ("必然メーカー")	2008	Hideaki Fukui		
"Koi No Aibou Kokoro No Cupid" ("恋ノアイボウ心ノクピド")	2008	Hideaki Fukui		
"Kanzen Kankaku Dreamer" ("完全感覚 Dreamer")	2010	Hideaki Fukui		
"Jibun Rock" ("じぶんRock")	2010	Hideaki Fukui		
"Liar"	2010	Kensaku Kakimoto		
"C.h.a.o.s.m.y.t.h"	2011	Masakazu Fukatsu		
"No Scared"	2011	Masakazu Fukatsu		
"Re:make"	2011	Daishin Suzuki		
"Answer is Near" ("アンサイズニア")	2011	Masakazu Fukatsu		
"The Beginning"	2012	Maxilla		
"Deeper Deeper"	2012	Takahide Ishii		
"Clock Strikes"	2013	Masakazu Fukatsu		
"Be the Light"	2013	Shoichi David Haruyama		
"Decision"	2014	—N/a	The video uses footage from the documentary Fool Cool Rock! One Ok Rock Documentary Film.	
"Mighty Long Fall"	2014	Ryohei Shingu		
"The Way Back" (Japanese ver.)	2015	Maxilla		
"Last Dance"	2015	Jeremy Cloe		
"Cry Out"	2015	Ryohei Shingu		
"Cry Out" (35xxxv Deluxe Edition)	2015	Naoto Amazutsumi	The video shows One Ok Rock performing the song in a studio session and contains live footage.	
"I was King" (Official Visualizer)	2016	Ruth Barrett (director & animator)	2D animated video that depicts a series of creatures taking down a King.	
"Bedroom Warfare"	2016	Sitcom Soldiers		
"Taking Off"	2016	Sitcom Soldiers		
"We Are"	2017	Mark Staubach		
"American Girls"	2017	Mark Staubach		
"Change"	2018	Raul Gonzo		
"Stand Out Fit In"	2018	Peter Huang		
"Wasted Nights"	2019	Kyle Cogan		
"Renegades"	2021	Toshi Atsunori		
"Broken Heart of Gold (Japanese ver.)"	2021	Koji Kashihara × Akira Miyazaki		
"Save Yourself"	2022	Tanu Muino		

== Video albums ==
List of video albums, with chart positions and certifications
Title	Details	Peak chart positions		Certifications	Sales
Title	Details	JPN Oricon DVD	JPN Oricon Blu-ray	Certifications	Sales
Live DVD "Yononaka Shredder" (Live DVD "世の中シュレッダー")	Released: March 19, 2008; Label: Aer-born; Formats: DVD	60	—		JPN: 4,150
This is My Budokan?! 2010.11.28	Released: February 16, 2011; Label: A-Sketch; Formats: DVD	2	—		JPN: 40,552
"Zankyo Reference" Tour in Yokohama Arena	Released: May 30, 2012; Label: A-Sketch; Formats: DVD, Blu-ray	3	2	RIAJ: Gold	JPN: 41,008 (DVD)
One Ok Rock 2013 "Jinsei x Kimi =" Tour Live&Film	Released: October 9, 2013; Label: A-Sketch; Formats: DVD, Blu-ray	1	2	RIAJ: Gold	JPN: 47,239
"Fool Cool Rock!" One Ok Rock Documentary Film	Released: November 12, 2014; Label: A-Sketch; Formats: DVD, Blu-ray	1	7		—N/a
One Ok Rock 2014 "Mighty Long Fall at Yokohama Stadium"	Released: April 29, 2015; Label: A-Sketch; Formats: DVD, Blu-ray	2	3	RIAJ: Gold	JPN: 96,271 (DVD); JPN: 22,250 (BD)
One Ok Rock 2015 “35xxxv” Japan Tour Live & Documentary	Released: April 6, 2016; Label: A-Sketch; Formats: DVD, Blu-ray	1	2	RIAJ: Gold	JPN: 76,802 (DVD); JPN: 34,797 (BD)
One Ok Rock 2016 Special Live in Nagisaen	Released: January 17, 2018; Label: A-Sketch; Formats: DVD, Blu-ray	2	1	RIAJ: Gold	JPN: 77,773 (DVD); JPN: 39,807 (BD)
One Ok Rock 2017 "Ambitions" Japan Tour	Released: May 16, 2018; Label: A-Sketch; Formats: DVD, Blu-ray	1	1	RIAJ: Gold	JPN: 66,473 (DVD); JPN: 33,795 (BD)
One Ok Rock 2018 Ambitions Japan Dome Tour	Released: August 21, 2019; Label: A-Sketch; Formats: DVD, Blu-ray	2	3		JPN: 51,511 (DVD); JPN: 29,277 (BD)
One Ok Rock with Orchestra Japan Tour 2018	Released: August 21, 2019; Label: A-Sketch; Formats: DVD, Blu-ray	1	2		JPN: 52,732 (DVD); JPN: 33,458 (BD)
One Ok Rock "Eye of the Storm" Japan Tour	Released: October 28, 2020; Label: A-Sketch; Formats: DVD, Blu-ray	1	1		JPN: 47,547 (DVD); JPN: 29,759 (BD)
One Ok Rock 2020 Field of Wonder at Stadium	Released: November 17, 2021; Label: 10969 Inc.; Formats: DVD, Blu-ray	1	1		JPN: 26,157 (DVD); JPN: 16,953 (BD)
One Ok Rock 2021 Day to Night Acoustic Sessions	Released: April 20, 2022; Label: 10969 Inc.; Formats: DVD, Blu-ray	1	1		—N/a
One Ok Rock 2023 Luxury Disease Japan Tour	Released: November 15, 2023; Label: 10969 Inc.; Formats: DVD, Blu-ray	1	1		
One Ok Rock 2024 Premonition World Tour at Ajinomoto Stadium	Released: April 30, 2025; Label: 10969 Inc.; Formats: DVD, Blu-ray	1	1		
One Ok Rock 2025 Detox Japan Tour at Nissan Stadium	Released: July 29, 2026; Label: 10969 Inc.; Formats: DVD, Blu-ray	1 (JPN Music); 3 (Overall)	1 (JPN Music); 3 (Overall)		
"—" denotes items which were released only in DVD format.

== Filmography ==
=== Films ===
Title	Year	Director	Notes	Ref.
Fool Cool Rock! One Ok Rock Documentary Film	2014	Hiroyuki Nakano	Documentary released and shown for limited time in theaters in Japan.	
One Ok Rock: Flip a Coin	2021	Naoto Amazutsumi	Documentary released exclusively on streaming service Netflix.	
One Ok Rock Detox Japan Tour 2025 at Nissan Stadium	2026	Naoto Amazutsumi	Documentary released and shown for limited time in theaters worldwide.	

=== Television ===
Title	Year	Notes	Ref.
One Ok Rock 2011-2012"残響リファレンス"Tour 〜Yokohama Arena Special Final〜	2012	The last two performances of the Zankyo Reference Tour held at Yokohama Arena, became a single performance, aired by channel Wowow.	
One Ok Rock 18祭 -1000人の奇跡 We are-	2017	Television special aired by NHK. One Ok Rock collaborates with a thousand Japanese teenagers who accompany them on a performance.	
One Ok Rock Live & Documentary "Ambitions Asia Tour 2018" in Taiwan	2018	Concert held in Taiwan and broadcast as an exclusive TV show on Space Shower TV.	
One Ok Rock World Tour Document	2019	Documentary broadcast by NHK World Premium, which follows One Ok Rock on their Eye of the Storm World Tour during the North American and European leg.	

== Commercials ==
Company	Year	Theme song	Description	Region	Ref.
Recochoku Co, Ltd.	2011	"Re:make"	Song used to promote Recochoku.	Japan	
Suzuki	2013	"Deeper Deeper"	Song used to promote Suzuki's Swift Sport.	Japan	
NHK-BS	2015	"Take Me to the Top"	Song used for broadcast of 2015 Rugby World Cup.	Japan	
NFL	2015	"Cry Out"	Live broadcast J-Wave Special Super Bowl XLIX Radio.	Japan	
NTT Docomo	2015	"Wherever You Are"	Phone commercial series: "Kazoku-hen".	Japan	
NTT Docomo	2016	"Always Coming Back"	Phone commercial series: "Kanjou no Subete / Nakama".	Japan	
NHK	2017	"We Are"	Theme for NHK's soccer broadcast.	Japan	
Honda	2017	"Take What You Want"	One Ok Rock appears driving Honda's New Civic on the road and features narration by frontman Takahiro Moriuchi.	Japan	
Honda	2018	"Change"	Song used to promote HondaJet. It is narrated by Moriuchi.	Japan	
Honda	2018	"Stand Out Fit In"	Song used to promote Honda Bike. It is narrated by Moriuchi.	Japan	
Honda	2019	"Head High"	One Ok Rock appears performing. It is narrated by Moriuchi.	Japan	
NBC	2020	"Wasted Nights"	Theme for the trailer for the drama television series Council of Dads.	United States	
CBS	2021	"Giants"	Theme for the trailer for the reality competition television series Tough as Nails (season 3).	United States	
Asahi Breweries	2022	"Wonder"	Song used to promote Asahi Super Dry.	Japan	
Seiko Watch Corp.	2022	"Save Yourself"	Song used to promote the Seiko Prospex line.	Japan	

== See also ==
- One Ok Rock discography
