= Hexagons (song) =

Single by Muse

from the album The Wow! Signal
- Released: 19 May 2026
- Genre: Progressive rock; electronic rock; space rock
- Length: 5:26
- Label: Warner; Helium 3
- Songwriter: Matt Bellamy
- Producers: Muse; Dan Lancaster; Aleks Von Korff

Muse singles chronology
"Cryogen" (2026)	"Hexagons" (2026)	"Nightshift Superstar" (2026)

"Hexagons" is a song by the English rock band Muse. Produced by the band alongside Dan Lancaster and Aleks Von Korff, it was released through Warner Records on 19 May 2026 as the fourth single from their tenth studio album, The Wow! Signal.

== Background ==
Ahead of the official release of "Hexagons", Muse launched a cryptic global billboard campaign over the weekend of 15–17 May 2026. Unique codes were hidden in billboards across six cities — Sydney, New York City, Los Angeles, Mexico City, Paris and London — which, when discovered, unlocked separate fragments of the song hosted on dedicated online pages. Fans collectively assembled the full version of the track online before Muse officially unveiled it.

== Composition and lyrics ==
"Hexagons" opens with an instrumental passage lasting over a minute, built around electric synthesisers, cinematic drums, and guitars, before developing into a dense arrangement of haunting vocals, distorted synth textures, and forceful electronic drum fills. The track has been described as pushing Muse "deeper into the futuristic electronic universe" of The Wow! Signal, while retaining the widescreen intensity associated with the band.

Lyrically, "Hexagons" explores themes of technological anxiety, loss of agency, and the search for human connection, consistent with the broader conceptual framework of The Wow! Signal, which draws on the unexplained narrowband radio signal detected in 1977.

== Release ==
"Hexagons" was officially released on 19 May 2026. The single is the fourth to be taken from The Wow! Signal, following "Unravelling" (2025), "Be with You" and "Cryogen" (both 2026).

== Critical reception ==
"Hexagons" received a broadly positive critical reception. Reviewers praised the song's cinematic scope and its affinities with Muse's earlier space rock output, noting shimmering arpeggios and towering climactic passages as highlights. XS Noize described the track as capturing Muse "at their most experimental while retaining the widescreen intensity that has defined the band for more than two decades". Radio X called it "another flamboyant and elaborate synth-filled rock number," while KRMQ-FM characterized the song as "space-age prog-rock at its most exploratory."
