= Detox (One Ok Rock album) =

Studio album by One Ok Rock
- Released: February 21, 2025
- Genres: Hard rock; pop-punk; alternative rock; power pop; alternative metal; pop rock
- Length: 38:05
- Languages: English; Japanese
- Label: Fueled by Ramen
- Producers: Tyler Carter; Rob Cavallo; Dai Dai; Rob Endling; Dan Lancaster; Meg; Pete Nappi; David Pramik; Kyle Reith; Toru; Megumi Wada

One Ok Rock chronology
Luxury Disease (2022)	Detox (2025)

Singles from Detox
- 1. "Delusion:All" Released: July 12, 2024; 2. "Dystopia" Released: October 25, 2024; 3. "+Matter" Released: December 6, 2024; 4. "Puppets Can't Control You" Released: January 19, 2025; 5. "Tropical Therapy" Released: February 21, 2025; 6. "C.U.R.I.O.S.I.T.Y." Released: April 17, 2025

Professional ratings
Review scores
Source	Rating
Kerrang!	2/5 stars

Detox is the eleventh studio album by Japanese rock band One Ok Rock. Produced by Rob Cavallo, it was released on February 21, 2025 through Fueled by Ramen. The album serves as a follow-up to their previous studio album, Luxury Disease (2022).

The album peaked at No. 2 on the Oricon weekly chart and No. 3 on the Oricon monthly chart. It also reached at No. 1 on Oricon Japanese Rock Albums and No. 2 on Billboard Japan Hot Albums. The album was certified gold by the RIAJ in Japan on February 21, 2025.

== Track listing ==
Detox track listing
No.	Title	Writer(s)	Producer(s)	Length
1.	"Nasty"	Derek Tyler Carter; Robert Phipps; Taka; Will IDap	Carter; Meg; Rob Endling; Rob Cavallo	3:23
2.	"Dystopia"	Jin Jin; Pete Nappi; Carter; Elijah Noll; Taka	Nappi; Cavallo	3:09
3.	"Tropical Therapy"	Carter; Jin Jin; Nappi; Taka	Nappi; Cavallo	3:28
4.	"Delusion:All"	Dan Lancaster; Carter; Jason Alon; Taka	Lancaster; Cavallo	3:04
5.	"Party's Over"	Lancaster; Carter; Meg; Taka; Toru	Lancaster; Meg; Toru; Cavallo	2:58
6.	"Puppets Can't Control You"	Dai Dai; Carter; Dru DeCaro; Gianni Taylor; Taka	Dai Dai; Cavallo	3:14
7.	"Tiny Pieces"	Lancaster; Carter; Sasha Sirota; Taka	Lancaster; Cavallo	3:34
8.	"This Can't Be Us"	Carter; Jin Jin; Nappi; Taka	Nappi; Cavallo	4:17
9.	"+Matter"	Nappi; Dai Dai; Carter; Alon; Taka	Nappi; Cavallo	3:52
10.	"C.U.R.I.O.S.I.T.Y." (featuring Paledusk and Chico Carlito)	Carlito; Dai Dai; David Pramik; Carter; DeCaro; Jamil Kazmi; Kaito; Ryota; Soma Genda; Taka; Tenma Tai; Tomoya; Toru	Pramik; Dai Dai; Megumi Wada; Cavallo	3:08
11.	"The Pilot </3"	Carter; Jin Jin; Nappi; Taka	Nappi; Kyle Reith; Cavallo	3:51
Total length:				38:05

== Personnel ==
One Ok Rock

- Takahiro "Taka" Moriuchi – lead vocals
- Toru Yamashita – guitar
- Ryota Kohama – bass guitar
- Tomoya Kanki – drums

Additional musicians

- Paledusk – guest vocals (10)
- Chico Carlito – guest vocals on (10)
- Pete Nappi – keyboards, additional guitar, strings arrangement
- Dan Lancaster – additional guitar, backing vocals
- Kyle Reith – keyboards
- David Campbell – strings arrangement
- Tim Pierce – additional guitar
- Rob Cavallo – additional guitar

Production

- Rob Cavallo – production
- Rhys May – assistant producer
- Zakk Cervini – mixing
- Julian Gargiulo – assistant mixer
- Vlado Meller – mastering
- Dan Lancaster – engineering, programming
- Nicole Schmidt – engineering
- Tyler Carter – engineering
- Joey Cavallo – engineering
- Pete Nappi – engineering
- Kyle Reith – programming

== Charts ==
=== Weekly charts ===
Weekly chart performance for Detox
Chart (2025)	Peak position
Japanese Albums (Oricon)	2
Japanese Combined Albums (Oricon)	2
Japanese Rock Albums (Oricon)	1
Japanese Hot Albums (Billboard Japan)	2
UK Albums Sales (OCC)	98
UK Rock & Metal Albums (Official Charts)	10

=== Monthly charts ===
Monthly chart performance for Detox
Chart (2025)	Position
Japanese Albums (Oricon)	3
Japanese Rock Albums (Oricon)	1

=== Year-end charts ===
Year-end chart performance for Detox
Chart (2025)	Position
Japanese Albums (Oricon)	48
Japanese Digital Albums (Oricon)	7
Japanese Hot Albums (Billboard Japan)	18

== Certifications ==
Certifications for Detox
Region	Certification	Certified units/sales
Japan (RIAJ) Physical	Gold	100,000^{^}
^{^} Shipments figures based on certification alone.
