= Luxury Disease =

- Japanese album cover

Studio album by One Ok Rock
- Released: September 9, 2022
- Studios: Blackstar Studios; United Recording L.A., United States; Decoy Studios, Suffolk, United Kingdom; Victor Studios, Tokyo, Japan
- Genres: Alternative rock; pop rock; power pop
- Length: 52:32 (Japanese edition); 45:12 (international edition)
- Languages: English; Japanese
- Label: Fueled by Ramen
- Producer: Rob Cavallo

One Ok Rock chronology
Eye of the Storm (2019)	Luxury Disease (2022)	Detox (2025)

Singles from Luxury Disease
- 1. "Renegades" Released: April 16, 2021; 2. "Broken Heart of Gold" Released: May 27, 2021; 3. "Wonder" Released: October 22, 2021; 4. "Save Yourself" Released: June 24, 2022; 5. "Let Me Let You Go" Released: August 29, 2022; 6. "Vandalize" Released: September 6, 2022

Luxury Disease is the tenth studio album by Japanese rock band One Ok Rock, released on September 9, 2022, through Fueled by Ramen, and produced by Rob Cavallo. The song "Vandalize" appears in the end credits from the 2022 game Sonic Frontiers, "Prove" is the opening theme of both the Japanese and English versions of season 1 of Beyblade X, and "Neon" is featured in the 2024 film Sonic the Hedgehog 3.

== Background ==
On June 24, 2022, the band announced new album Luxury Disease set to be released on September 9. According to vocalist Taka, the album's title is an English translation of their first album title Zeitakubyo, as they felt similar uncertainty about something. "We're making a fresh start with the experience we've gained in the US. I remembered when we released our first album in Japan, Zeitakubyo, we were in a similar situation where we felt uncertain about lots of things. So we've translated Zeitakubyo into English to show we've determined to do our best on the world stage."

== Composition and lyrics ==
In an Apple Music commentary, Taka stated that the album marks a change from a pop style of the previous album to a more rock-centered sound as the band wanted to bring back the essence of rock music. "Save Yourself" is the album's first track, and its lyrics urges one to leave when love hurts deep. The second song, "Neon", giving off Panic! at the Disco vibe as Brendon Urie helped the band co-wrote the song. It tells about neon-lit city Shibuya, which known as one of a major nightlife area in Japan. The third track, "Vandalize", is an upbeat song, brings back the band's emo sound with some Japanese rock-inspired melodies.

"When They Turn the Lights On"
Sample of "When They Turn the Lights On", the fourth track from Luxury Disease, showing Queen and My Chemical Romance influences with musical and operatic rock sound.

One Ok Rock explores musical and operatic rock on the fourth track, "When They Turn the Lights On", combining the sound of Queen and My Chemical Romance. "Let Me Let You Go" is the album's fifth track, a pop rock song co-written by 5 Seconds of Summer drummer Ashton Irwin, telling about someone who can't return the affection of the person who loves him until the relationship ends without any effort to prevent it. Next track "So Far Gone" is a heartbreaking song, about someone trying to be strong after losing the precious one. "Prove" is a motivational song, co-written by Bring Me the Horizon keyboardist Jordan Fish, reflects a person's determination to continue to grow and never give up after experiencing failure. "Mad World" is a more personal track to vocalist Taka, depicts the problems he encountered when he was 15 years old. The Japanese version of the song has the most Japanese lyrics out of the album, with only one sentence in English.

The album's ninth track, "Free Them", features guest vocal Teddy Swims, tells about the desire to release the emotions that have been kept. An alternative rock/pop rock song of the album, "Renegades", co-written by Ed Sheeran and Coldrain vocalist Masato Hayakawa, conveying an urgent message that calls into question about the current state of affairs in the world, and an anthem for the renegades refusing their battles and passions to be ignored. "Outta Sight" is an upbeat song, while "Your Tears are Mine" is a ballad with the reminiscent of Queen's rock sound. The last track of the International edition album, "Wonder", has a classic rock epic vibe with big drum fills and arena-ready chords. The Japanese edition of Luxury Disease add the songs "Broken Heart of Gold" and "Gravity". "Broken Heart of Gold" is a melodic ballad song, implying someone who is desperate with the situation and forces himself to endure it. The last track, "Gravity", features Official Hige Dandism vocalist Satoshi Fujihara. Its lyrics tells about someone determined not to falling for the same wrong person.

== Singles and release ==
The first single "Renegades" was released on April 16, 2021, used as the theme song for the live-action film Rurouni Kenshin: The Final. The film also uses the second single from the album, "Broken Heart of Gold", for Rurouni Kenshin: The Beginning, released on May 27, 2021. Third single "Wonder" which had performed live in 2020, released on October 22, 2021. In 2022, the fourth single "Save Yourself" was released on June 24 along with the music video and announcement of the album's title and release date. The fifth single "Let Me Let You Go" was released on August 29 alongside an accompanying music video. The sixth single from the album, "Vandalize" was released three days prior to the release of the album on September 6, 2022. The censored version of the song featured as one of the ending themes on the soundtrack for Sonic Frontiers, a video game in Sega's long-running Sonic the Hedgehog franchise.

== Track listing ==
Luxury Disease – Standard edition
No.	Title	Writer(s)	Producer(s)	Length
1.	"Save Yourself"	Takahiro Moriuchi; Toru Yamashita; Rob Cavallo; Tyler Carter; Andrew DeCaro; Sasha Sirota; Luis Martinez; Pink Slip; Charles Roberts	Cavallo; Falconry	3:17
2.	"Neon"	Jake Sinclair; Mike Viola; Brendon Urie; Moriuchi; Yamashita; Cavallo; Carter; Slip; Roberts	Cavallo; Slip; Inverness; Sinclair	3:04
3.	"Vandalize"	Moriuchi; Cavallo; Carter; DeCaro; Sirota	Cavallo; Falconry; Sirota	3:14
4.	"When They Turn the Lights On"	CJ Baran; Moriuchi; Yamashita; Cavallo; Carter; Sirota; Sinclair	Cavallo; Baran; Sinclair	3:27
5.	"Let Me Let You Go"	Colin Brittain; Ashton Irwin; Madison Simmen; Elisha Noll; Moriuchi	Cavallo; Brittain	3:00
6.	"So Far Gone"	David Pramik; Griffith Clawson; Moriuchi; Yamashita; Cavallo; Carter	Cavallo; Pramik	3:35
7.	"Prove"	Dan Lancaster; Jordan Fish; Mike Duce; Jamil Kazmi; Moriuchi; Yamashita; Carter	Cavallo; Lancaster; Fish	3:46
8.	"Mad World"	Pete Nappi; Jordan Benjamin; Moriuchi; Yamashita	Cavallo; Nappi	3:02
9.	"Free Them" (featuring Teddy Swims)	Jim Irvin; Julian Emery; Moriuchi; Sirota; Kazmi	Sirota; Cavallo; Emery	3:12
10.	"Renegades"	Ed Sheeran; Janee Bennett; Masato Hayakawa; Moriuchi; Pramik	Cavallo; Pramik	4:04
11.	"Outta Sight"	Brian Lee; Evan Gartner; Moriuchi; Cavallo; Carter; Sirota	Cavallo; Lee	3:22
12.	"Your Tears are Mine"	Nick Long; Ava King; Moriuchi; Cavallo; DeCaro; Sinclair	Cavallo	4:16
13.	"Wonder"	Moriuchi; Hayakawa; Pramik; Bennett	Pramik; Cavallo	3:47
Total length:				45:12

Luxury Disease – Japanese edition
No.	Title	Writer(s)	Producer(s)	Length
14.	"Broken Heart of Gold"	Moriuchi; Yamashita; Hayakawa; Long; Lancaster	Cavallo; Lancaster	4:13
15.	"Gravity" (featuring Satoshi Fujihara)	Moriuchi; Lancaster; Duce	Lancaster; Cavallo	3:12
Total length:				52:32

Luxury Disease – Japanese limited edition (bonus DVD)
No.	Title	Length
14.	"Vandalize" (Studio Jam Session Vol.5)
15.	"Your Tears are Mine" (Studio Jam Session Vol.5)

== Personnel ==
One Ok Rock

- Takahiro "Taka" Moriuchi – vocals
- Toru Yamashita – guitar
- Ryota Kohama – bass guitar
- Tomoya Kanki – drums

Production

- Ted Jensen - mastering

== Charts ==
=== Weekly charts ===
Weekly chart performance for Luxury Disease
Chart (2022)	Peak position
Japanese Albums (Oricon)	1
Japanese Albums (Oricon) International version	7
Japanese Combined Albums (Oricon)	1
Japanese Combined Albums (Oricon) International version	9
Japanese Hot Albums (Billboard)	1
UK Album Downloads (Official Charts)	35
US Top Current Album Sales (Billboard)	92

=== Monthly charts ===
Monthly chart performance for Luxury Disease
Chart (2022)	Peak position
Japanese Albums (Oricon)	4
Japanese Albums (Oricon) International version	16

=== Year-end charts ===
Year-end chart performance for Luxury Disease
Chart (2022)	Position
Japanese Albums (Oricon)	39
Japanese Hot Albums (Billboard Japan)	36

== Certifications ==
Certifications for Luxury Disease
Region	Certification	Certified units/sales
Japan (RIAJ)	Gold	100,000^{^}
^{^} Shipments figures based on certification alone.
