= Stand Out Fit In =

Stand Out Fit In may refer to:

- Stand Out/Fit In, a 2007 album by The Basics
- "Stand Out Fit In", a 2018 song from by One Ok Rock from the 2019 album Eye of the Storm
