= Head High =

Head High may refer to:

- "Head High", a song by Joey Badass from 2000 (2022)
- "Head High", a song by One Ok Rock from Eye of the Storm (2019)
