= Hush (Muse song) =

- Promotional poster

Single by Muse featuring Ellie Goulding

from the album The Wow! Signal
- Released: 26 June 2026
- Genre: Europop; hard rock
- Length: 3:56
- Label: Warner; Helium 3
- Songwriters: Matt Bellamy; Dan Lancaster; Nicholas Gale; Richard Boardman; Theo Hutchcraft
- Producers: Muse; Dan Lancaster

Muse singles chronology
"Nightshift Superstar" (2026)	"Hush" (2026)

Ellie Goulding singles chronology
"Black Prada Dress" (2026)	"Hush" (2026)	"4 Seasons" (2026)

Visualiser
- "Hush" on YouTube

"Hush" is a song by the English band Muse, featuring the English singer-songwriter Ellie Goulding. It was released as the sixth single from their tenth studio album, The Wow! Signal throughout Warner Records on 26 June 2026, concurrently with the album.

== Background ==
"Hush" features guest vocals from singer-songwriter Ellie Goulding, marking the first time Muse had a credited collaboration as a featuring on one of their studio albums. Goulding had previously expressed admiration for the band, writing "Dreamt I was in Muse" in a 2012 post on X (formerly Twitter).

"I've bumped into Ellie a bunch of times over the years and we've talked about doing something. She just popped her head in at about 11 pm. She asked to listen, [...] someone asked her to sing on it. We just turned it into a duet at that point. She sang it in a couple of takes and an hour-and-a-half later, we had the song."

— Matt Bellamy, via NME, on how the collab with Ellie Goulding happened

The band's frontman Matt Bellamy credited fellow English singer-songwriter Chris Martin with influencing his decision to collaborate with another artist after Martin gave him the book The Collaborative Way as a Christmas gift, which Bellamy described as Martin's way of saying, "You need to learn to collaborate." In an interview with Andrew Trendell of NME, Bellamy explained that the collaboration came about by "absolutely sheer coincidence" as Goulding was recording next door. The collaboration was kept secret and was not publicly revelead until a few days before the album's release.

== Composition and release ==
"Hush" was produced by Muse and Dan Lancaster, with additional production from Aleks von Korff. The song was written by the three members of Muse, Lancaster, Theo Hutchcraft of Hurts, Nicholas James Gale (known professionally as Digital Farm Animals), and Richard Boardman. Released on 26 June 2026, it appears as the ninth track on The Wow! Signal.

Clash magazine described it as "remarkably effective, fusing starry europop with one of the trio's finest choruses". Financial Times, music critic Ludovic Hunter-Tilney, described it as "a hard-rock power ballad". According the single press release, the lyrics describes "a last desperate grasp for connection between two souls in the midst of an apocalyptic event." A sci-fi themed visualiser, directed by Harry Lindley, was released the same day as the album release.

== Reception ==
As reported by NME, the announcement of the collaboration was met with scepticism from the band's rock fanbase, largely due to Goulding's pop star status. Bellamy commented about the reactions, stating: "Muse fans will read online that we've done a song with Ellie Goulding and think it's going to be a pop song. But it's got one of the biggest, heaviest riffs we've done in a long time, so I thought it was quite fun to get Ellie's voice over that kind of heaviness."

After the song release, the reception turned generally positive with critics calling it a "standout surprise" on the album. Jennifer Lavis-Quinlin of The AU Review praised the "musical conversation between Goulding and Bellamy," dubbing it "a knockout". Mike DeWald of Riff Magazine praised the song's execution and the chemistry between the artists, stating that Goulding's textured vocals complement Bellamy's upper register beautifully, resulting in one of the album's standout tracks. DeWald concluded that Goulding "is a natural fit for rock music, but her classical influence mixes well with Muse's aesthetic". Sputnikmusic staff stated that while "it's not necessarily a pairing you'd expect", Goulding's "shimmering, dreamy vocals" are an "ideal complement" to Muse's "synth-wrapped space rock," which intertwine the album sequence, appearing as "a breath of fresh air".

== Personnel ==
Credits were adapted from Tidal.

- Matt Bellamy — vocals, producer, songwriter
- Dominic Howard — drums, producer, songwriter
- Chris Wolstenholme — bass, producer, songwriter, backing vocals
- Ellie Goulding — vocals
- Dan Lancaster — producer, songwriter
- Theo Hutchcraft — songwriter
- Richard Boardman — songwriter
- Nicholas James Gale — songwriter
- Aleks von Korff — additional producer, recording engineer
- Chris Whitemeyer — studio assistant
- Rhys May — digital editor, assistant vocal recording engineer, assistant mixer
- Ed Farrell — assistant engineer
- Dan Hayden — assistant engineer

== Charts ==
Chart performance
Chart (2026)	Peak position
Estonia Airplay (TopHit)	165
New Zealand Hot Singles (RMNZ)	25
UK Rock & Metal (Official Charts)	22

== Release history ==
Release dates and formats
Region	Date	Format(s)	Label	Ref.
Various	26 June 2026	Digital download; streaming	Warner	

== See also ==
- List of songs recorded by Muse
- List of songs recorded by Ellie Goulding
