= First Congregational Church of Los Angeles =

Los Angeles Historic-Cultural Monument

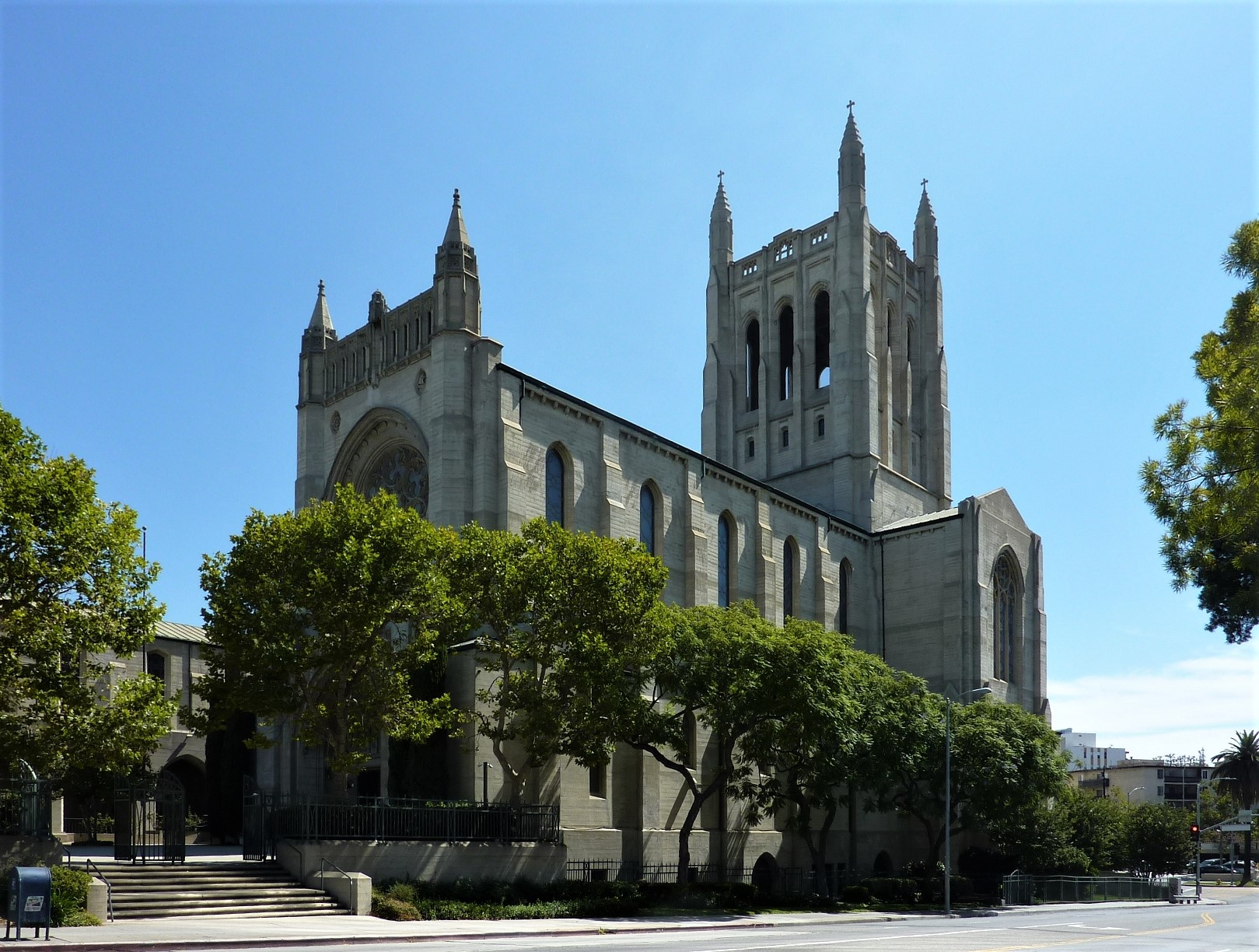
- First Congregational Church of Los Angeles
- 34°3′51.8″N 118°17′5.4″W
- Location: 540 S Commonwealth Ave, Los Angeles, CA 90020
- Country: United States
- Denomination: United Church of Christ
- Churchmanship: Congregational
- Website: fccla.org

History
- Status: Church
- Founded: 1867

Architecture
- Functional status: Active
- Architect: Allison & Allison
- Style: English Gothic Revival
- Completed: 1932

Specifications
- Height: 157 ft (48 m) (tower)
- Materials: Reinforced concrete

First Congregational Church of Los Angeles is located at 540 South Commonwealth Avenue, Los Angeles, California, United States. It is a member of the United Church of Christ. Founded in 1867, the church is the city's oldest continuous Protestant congregation. The congregation moved around using a variety of buildings until it moved to its current location in 1932, with the first service being held on March 13, 1932.

The building is in English Gothic Revival-style designed by Los Angeles architects James Edward Allison & David Clark Allison. The massive concrete structure was reinforced with more than 500 tons of steel, and supported by more than 150 caissons extending up to forty-five feet into the bedrock. Its dominant feature is a tower soaring 157 feet and weighing 30,000 tons. Four three-ton pinnacles used to cap the corners of the tower which rise another nineteen feet. These capstones were dislocated in 1994 by the Northridge Earthquake, and removed shortly thereafter, eventually to be replaced by fiberglass replicas, and eventually resurfaced as monuments at the church's driveway entrances on Commonwealth Street.

The church has the world's second largest church organ.

On March 15, 2002, the church was designated a Historic-Cultural Monument by the Los Angeles Cultural Heritage Commission.

== Organ ==
The church has the world's second largest church organ. Similar to the instrument at St. Stephen's Cathedral, Passau (with five organs, one console), it consists of multiple organs playing from twin consoles. Now known as "The Great Organs at First Church," the instruments were installed over a period of approximately 70 years. As of 2023, The Great Organs at First Church consist of 18,094 speaking pipes, 328 ranks, 15 divisions, and a total of 278 speaking stops:

- The Seeley Wintersmith Mudd Memorial Organ (Chancel) - The church's original instrument, a Skinner Organ built in 1931, is immediately visible upon entering the Sanctuary, flanking either side of the Chancel.
- Frank C. Noon Memorial Organ (West Gallery) - In 1969, a Schlicker Organ was installed by Organist in residence, Lloyd Holzgraf. The organ's look and sound "enables the organist to capture the spirit and inspiration of the North German tradition of the 17th century."
- The Italian Division (Chancel) - A small Italian-style Continuo Organ built by Schlicker, situated adjacent to the South Choir of the Chancel.
- The Holzgraf Trumpet Royale (Chancel) - These powerful trumpets were installed in 1984, in honor of Mr. Holzgraf’s 25th Anniversary at First Church.
- The Gospel and Epistle Divisions (North and South Transepts) - Under the direction of the famed Frederick Swann, Organist in Residence from 1998 to 2001, William Zeiler completed the installation of Divisions in the North Transept Gallery (Gospel) and the South Transept Gallery (Epistle), so that those attending services and concerts at First Church are now surrounded by music on four sides.

The Moller Consoles were installed during renovations in the early 1990s, replacing the original duplicate Schlicker consoles of 1969 which had become outdated and could no longer fully control the many new additions. The Chancel console, installed in 1992, is known to be one of the last works from the Moller firm, which closed its doors that same year. Its twin, the Gallery console, was completed by former Moller craftsmen at the Hagertown Organ Company. The Moller Consoles are the largest draw-knob consoles ever built in the Western Hemisphere.

The current organist in residence, Dr. Christoph Bull, hosts a free playlist of videos featuring The Great Organs at First Church, for those interested in hearing the instrument in action. The organ parts of the Muse songs Be With You and Shimmering Scars (appearing on their tenth album The Wow! Signal) were recorded at the church.

== Media ==
The church has been a popular location for commercials, films, music videos, and television shows.

=== Commercials ===
Company	Commercial	Year
Kia		1999
Men's Wearhouse	"New Suit"	2004
Microsoft		2005

=== Film ===
Movie	Year
Dragonfly	2002
Mr. Deeds	2002
Daredevil	2003
Along Came Polly	2004
Spider-Man 2	2004
National Treasure	2004
Blood & Chocolate	2007
Into the Wild	2007
Nancy Drew	2007
Marcel the Shell with Shoes On	2022

=== Music Videos ===
Artist	Song	Date
Gerald Levert	"Taking Everything"	1998
Nas	"Got Ur Self a Gun"	2001
DMX	"I Miss You"	2001
Linkin Park	"Numb"	2003

=== Television ===
Show	Episode	Date
The A-Team	"A Little Town With an Accent"	May 6, 1986
My So-Called Life	"So-Called Angels"	December 22, 1994
Any Day Now		1998
Profiler		1998
Seven Days		1998
Vengeance Unlimited		1998
To Have & to Hold	"Pilot"	September 30, 1998
Locust Valley	"Pilot"	1999
The X-Files	"Milagro"	April 18, 1999
Ugly Betty	"A Nice Day for a Posh Wedding"	November 8, 2007
The Assassination of Gianni Versace: American Crime Story	"Alone"	March 21, 2018
