= Broken Heart of Gold =

Single by One Ok Rock

from the album Luxury Disease
- Released: 27 May 2021
- Length: 4:13
- Label: Fueled by Ramen
- Songwriters: Takahiro Moriuchi; Toru Yamashita; Nick Long; Dan Lancaster; Masato Hayakawa
- Producers: Rob Cavallo; Dan Lancaster

One Ok Rock singles chronology
"Renegades" (2021)	"Broken Heart of Gold" (2021)	"Wonder" (2021)

Music video
- "Broken Heart of Gold (Japanese version)" on YouTube

"Broken Heart of Gold" is a song by Japanese rock band One Ok Rock. The song was written by vocalist Takahiro Moriuchi and guitarist Toru Yamashita with Nick Long, Dan Lancaster and Masato Hayakawa. It was released as a digital single on 27 May 2021 by Fueled by Ramen, serving as the theme song for the live-action film Rurouni Kenshin: The Beginning.

An acoustic version of the song was released digitally on 2 July 2021.

== Track listing ==
- Digital download / streaming
1. "Broken Heart of Gold" – 4:13
2. "Broken Heart of Gold (Japanese version)" – 4:13
3. "Broken Heart of Gold (Acoustic)" – 3:40
4. "Broken Heart of Gold (Acoustic - Japanese version)" – 3:40

== Personnel ==
Credits adapted from Luxury Disease album liner notes

- Takahiro "Taka" Moriuchi – vocals, songwriting
- Toru Yamashita – guitar, songwriting
- Ryota Kohama – bass
- Tomoya Kanki – drums
- Jamie Muhoberac - keyboards
- Nick Long – songwriter
- Dan Lancaster – songwriting, producer
- Masato Hayakawa – songwriting
- Rob Cavallo - producer
- David Campbell - orchestral arrangement
- Tom Lord-Alge - mixing engineer
- Naoki Itai - Japanese vocals recording, editing

== Charts ==
Weekly chart performance for "Broken Heart of Gold"
Chart (2021)	Peak position
Czech Republic (Modern Rock)	2
Global 200 (Billboard)	176
Japan Billboard Hot 100	17
Japan Digital Singles (Oricon)	3

== Certifications ==
Certifications for "Broken Heart of Gold"
Region	Certification	Certified units/sales
Streaming
Japan (RIAJ)	Gold	50,000,000^{†}
^{†} Streaming-only figures based on certification alone.

== Release history ==
Release dates and formats for "Broken Heart of Gold"
Region	Date	Format(s)	Version	Label	Ref.
Japan	27 May 2021	Digital download; streaming	Standard	Fueled By Ramen	
Australia	27 May 2021	Digital download; streaming	Standard	Fueled By Ramen	
Argentina	27 May 2021	Digital download; streaming	Standard	Fueled By Ramen	
United States	27 May 2021	Digital download; streaming	Standard	Fueled By Ramen	
German	27 May 2021	Digital download; streaming	Standard	Fueled By Ramen	
Taiwan	27 May 2021	Digital download; streaming	Standard	Fueled By Ramen	
Japan	2 July 2021	Digital download; streaming	Acoustic	Fueled By Ramen	
Australia	2 July 2021	Digital download; streaming	Acoustic	Fueled By Ramen	
Argentina	2 July 2021	Digital download; streaming	Acoustic	Fueled By Ramen	
United States	2 July 2021	Digital download; streaming	Acoustic	Fueled By Ramen	
German	2 July 2021	Digital download; streaming	Acoustic	Fueled By Ramen	
Taiwan	2 July 2021	Digital download; streaming	Acoustic	Fueled By Ramen	
