= The Wow! Signal (album) =

Studio album by Muse
- Released: 26 June 2026
- Recorded: 2025–2026
- Studios: Ocean Park (Los Angeles); Abbey Road (London); The Black Lodge (London); The Red Room (Santa Monica); First Congregational Church (Los Angeles)
- Genres: Alternative rock; space rock; progressive rock; art rock; hard rock
- Length: 45:27
- Labels: Warner; Helium-3
- Producers: Muse; Dan Lancaster; Aleks von Korff

Muse chronology
Will of the People (2022)	The Wow! Signal (2026)

Singles from The Wow! Signal
- 1. "Unravelling" Released: 20 June 2025; 2. "Be with You" Released: 19 March 2026; 3. "Cryogen" Released: 24 April 2026; 4. "Hexagons" Released: 19 May 2026; 5. "Nightshift Superstar" Released: 5 June 2026; 6. "Hush" Released: 26 June 2026

The Wow! Signal is the tenth studio album by the English rock band Muse, released on 26 June 2026 through Warner Records and Helium-3. It was produced by Muse, Dan Lancaster and Aleks von Korff.

The bandleader, Matt Bellamy, said Lancaster pushed Muse to create a more modern sound. The lyrics explore themes of cosmic mystery, influenced by Bellamy's split from the model Elle Evans. "Hush" features the singer Ellie Goulding. "Unravelling", "Be with You", "Cryogen", "Hexagons", and "Nightshift Superstar" were released as singles ahead of the album.

The Wow! Signal received generally favourable reviews and became Muse's eighth consecutive UK number 1 album. A North American tour began in July 2026, and a European arena tour began in November.

== Recording ==
In mid-2025, the bandleader, Matt Bellamy, split from his wife, the model Elle Evans. To prioritise his children, Bellamy cancelled Muse shows scheduled for February 2026 in South Africa, India, and the United Arab Emirates. The split influenced the writing of the album, which Bellamy wrote mostly in late 2025 "in the depths of this life-changing experience". He said The Wow! Signal may have been the easiest Muse album to make: "It would just pour out of me ... It was such a catharsis. It became a lifeline for me."

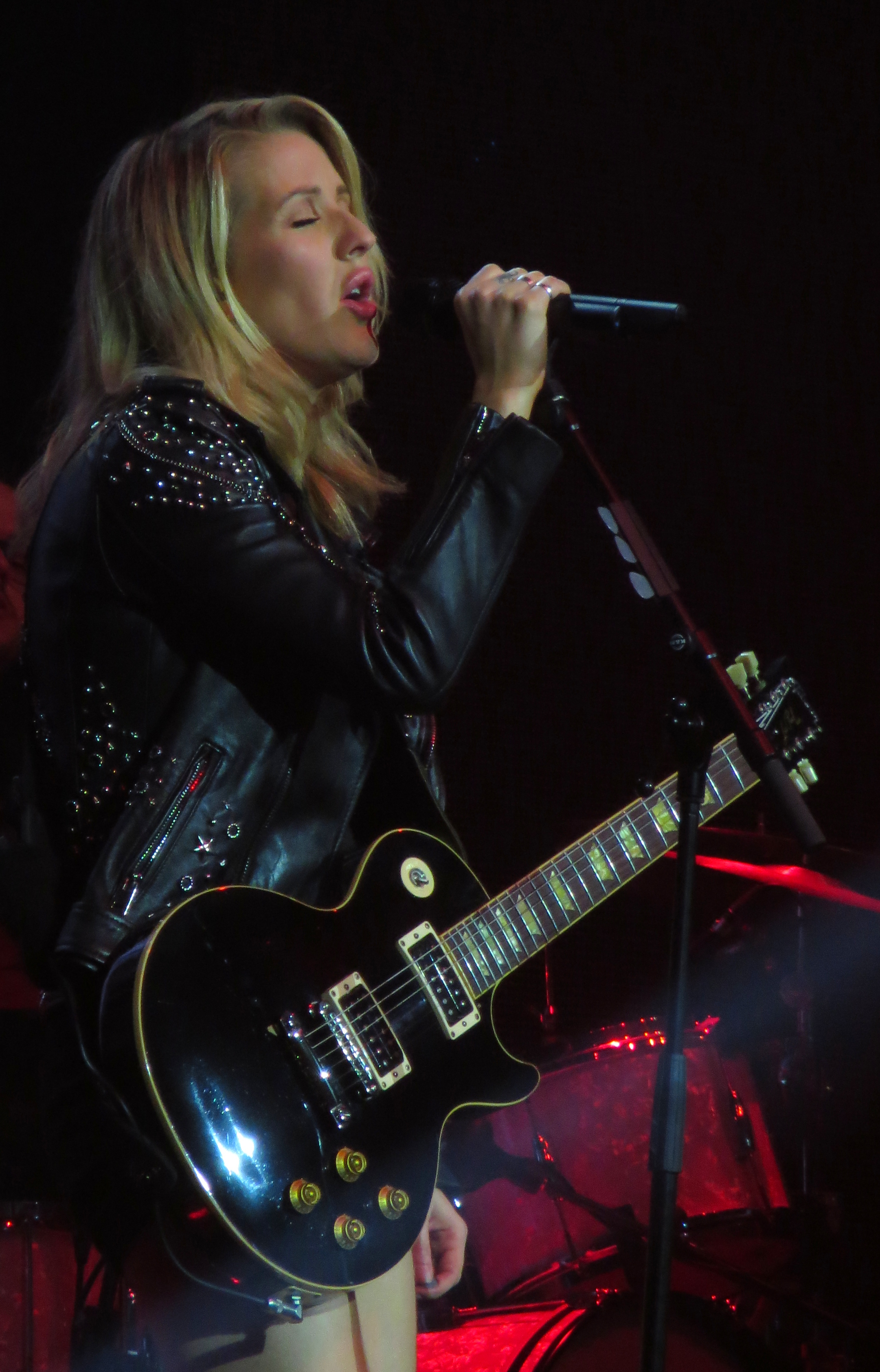
Ellie Goulding sang guest vocals on "Hush".

Eight tracks were produced by Dan Lancaster and two by Aleks von Korff. Lancaster has been a touring member with Muse since May 2022. After self-producing several albums, Bellamy decided to "let go of the reins a little bit". He also credited influence from the Coldplay singer, Chris Martin, who encouraged him to collaborate more. Bellamy described the band members as "control freaks" who initially disliked being given instructions, but said Lancaster pushed them in a new way to create a more "fresh" and modern sound. He likened him to a member of the band.

"Hush" is the first Muse song to feature a guest vocalist, the English singer-songwriter Ellie Goulding. Goulding was working in the same studio as Muse and was invited to add vocals. Bellamy said: "We just turned it into a duet at that point. She sang it in a couple of takes and an hour and a half later we had the song."

== Composition and lyrics ==
Critics have described The Wow! Signal as alternative rock, space rock, progressive rock, art rock and hard rock, with elements of dance, electronic, pop and piano balladry. Featuring a more cohesive sound than Muse's previous two albums, Simulation Theory (2018) and Will of the People (2022), that prioritizes guitars over synths, The Wow! Signal has been regarded as a "return to form" in line with Muse's albums Origin of Symmetry (2001), Absolution (2003) and Black Holes and Revelations (2006). Rather than rehashing their previous work, Muse build upon it with electronic beats reminiscent of The 2nd Law (2012), 8-string guitars that continue the heavy metal experimentation of Will of the People, and a more symphonic rock sound.

Neil Z. Young of AllMusic compared its design to Will of the People, which Bellamy described as a "greatest hits album – of new songs". Young said that The Wow! Signal feels "less like a paint-by-numbers parody of Muse and more like a band extracting the best elements of their DNA and creating something entirely new". Alexis Petridis of The Guardian said it was less "bombastic and melodramatic" than their last few albums. Jon Dolan of Rolling Stone noted influence from Queen, Korn and Radiohead, combined with "seventies arena theatrics, Eighties synth-rock, Nineties alt-rock, and 2000s goth-metal". Ed Power of The Irish Times described The Wow! Signal as "a glam odyssey that fuses metal, techno, science fiction and prog rock," while Shaun Curran of The i Paper similarly felt it spanned the "full gamut of Muse sounds".

A concept album, The Wow! Signal explores themes of "cosmic mystery" and the "possibility of contact with something far greater than ourselves". The title is derived from the 1977 narrowband radio signal reported to have suggested the existence of intelligent extraterrestrial life. This is not only a metaphor for Bellamy's break-up from Evans, with him going through the five stages of grief (denial, anger, bargaining, depression, and acceptance) to find emotional stability as a now single father, but also artificial intelligence (AI). Bellamy said that although AI is not praticulary bad, it "hurts creativity", particularly in rock songwriting, but will "explain something to us that we don't understand yet".

=== Songs ===
"Hexagons" was the opening song played on tour at Co-op Live on 13 November 2026

The opening track, "The Dark Forest", is inspired by the dark forest hypothesis, a proposed solution to the Fermi paradox which advocates that civilisations hide from one another to avoid destruction. Described as a rock opera, it features a rhythmic progressive rock sound likened to Muse's 2006 song "Knights of Cydonia" and scores to films such as Dune, Lawrence of Arabia and The Mummy. It begins with synthesisers and with a clip of the Wow! signal, followed by Latin choir (Kyrie Eleison, Sanctus) and orchestral parts played by the London Metropolitan Orchestra. Bellamy's son, Bingham, plays percussion. At around 3:20, the song moves into hard rock with a guitar solo and "chugging" riffs.

"Nightshift Superstar" has elements of disco and funk, similarly to the Muse songs "Supermassive Black Hole" and "Panic Station". It was influenced by ABBA and French house acts such as Justice and Daft Punk. Despite the bass-driven sound, Muse's rock energy is still present with Bellamy's guitar work and falsetto. His daughter, Lovella, sings in the children's choir. The title is a tribute to the early years of his relationship with Evans, whom he described as "a real party girl".

== Release and promotion ==
Muse began a European festival tour on 12 June 2025, and released the single "Unravelling" on 20 June. On 19 March, 2026, Muse released "Be with You" and announced the album title and release date. Muse promoted the announcement by sending a tablet 33km above the Earth with the English aerospace company Sent Into Space.

Muse played a small show at London's Brixton Academy in April, and debuted "Cryogen". It was released as the third single on 24 April, followed by "Hexagons" on 19 May and "Nightshift Superstar" on 5 June. The Wow! Signal was released on 26 June 2026 through Warner Records and Helium-3. It debuted at number three on the global albums chart with 102,000 album-equivalent units in its opening week, including 97,000 from sales and 5,000 from streaming. The album opened with 21,951 units in the United States during the tracking week ending July 2, 2026, including 17,472 album sales, 111 track-equivalent albums (TEA), and 4,367 streaming-equivalent albums (SEA). In France, the album debuted at number one on the SNEP Top Albums chart with 21,576 album-equivalent units. In the United Kingdom, the album debuted atop the UK Albums Chart with 34,933 album-equivalent units, becoming Muse's eighth consecutive number-one album and making them the first group and second act in chart history to debut at number one with eight consecutive studio albums. The total included 14,848 CD sales, 15,256 vinyl sales, 563 cassette sales, 1,756 digital downloads, and 2,510 streaming-equivalent units.

Muse began the Wow! Signal Tour with a North American leg in July. A European leg is due to begin on 12 November 2026, including two shows at the O2 Arena in London.

== Reception ==
Professional ratings
Aggregate scores
Source	Rating
AnyDecentMusic?	6.6/10
Metacritic	66/100
Review scores
Source	Rating
AllMusic	4/5 stars
The Arts Desk	5/5 stars
Clash	8/10
Classic Rock	4.5/5 stars
The Guardian	4/5 stars
NME	4/5 stars
Pitchfork	4.5/10
Rolling Stone	2/5 stars
Sputnikmusic	4.5/5
Under the Radar	7/10 stars

According to the review aggregator Metacritic, The Wow! Signal received "generally favorable reviews" based on a weighted average score of 66 out of 100 from thirteen critic scores. The review aggregator Any Decent Music gave it a weighted average score of 6.6 out of 10 from fifteen critic scores.

In NME, Andrew Trendell said The Wow! Signal was Muse's most consistent and satisfying album since Black Holes and Revelations (2006). He praised Lancaster for producing a more focused album than Muse's recent albums, saying it was "still bonkers" but felt "human and authentic". The Guardian critic Alexis Petridis wrote: "There's something curiously admirable about its commitment to its utterly preposterous bit, its refusal to bow to any notion of maturity or good taste and instead double down in its own world. If you wouldn't want to live there all time, a visit is never boring." In AllMusic, Neil Z Young wrote that The Wow! Signal was "a seamlessly executed and proudly over-the-top experience, getting Muse back on track with a catalogue highlight that's a lot more vital and fun than their preceding few offerings".

Blabbermouth.net wrote: "The album is great because it trusts the songs and lets them breathe. Instead of going for another reinvention, the band relies on what it has always done best: writing big, memorable tracks that stick long after the final note. Sometimes the smartest move isn't change. It's remembering why people showed up in the first place." Sputnikmusic wrote that "Muse have managed to not only recapture their spark, but also to succeed on so many different fronts. It feels like a career summation in the best way possible, featuring blistering rockers, elaborate guitar solos, synthy/spaced-out atmospheres, groove-laden pop tracks, poignant personal moments ... and brilliantly catchy melodies front-to-end." In Clash, Luke Winstanley wrote: "For a long time, it felt like Muse would be one of those acts frozen in a seemingly never-ending cycle, unable to recapture their early magic. The Wow! Signal not only sees them break that purgatorial cycle, but suggests that more greatness is on the way."

Kerrang wrote that Muse "[threw] in everything including the kitchen synth" for their "joyously uninhibited" tenth album. They called it "delightfully overblown when it wants to be", and end the review by saying "Muse [has sent] out their most impressive and creative signal in a while". The Irish Times described the album as "a glam odyssey, [that] fuses metal, techno, science fiction and prog rock into an overstuffed inferno of absurdity. Ludicrous but great fun, it's a gravity-defying sound only Muse can make."

In Rolling Stone, Jon Dolan wrote that "as is often the case with this ostentatiously bombastic UK band, their music won't blow your mind so much as beat it into numb submission". He praised the more restrained final track, "Space Debris", as "proof that it'd be OK if Muse kept things a little less intense. Of course, if they did, they wouldn't be Muse." Liam Inscoe-Jones of Pitchfork considered the album "too sincere to have fun and too obnoxious to take seriously ... Expecting subtlety from Muse may seem futile, but the subject matter—be it space or heartbreak—demands it."

== Track listing ==
All tracks are written by Matt Bellamy, Dominic Howard, Chris Wolstenholme, and Dan Lancaster, except where noted.

The Wow! Signal track listing
No.	Title	Writer(s)	Producer(s)	Length
1.	"The Dark Forest"	Bellamy	Muse; Aleks Von Korff	5:16
2.	"Nightshift Superstar"		Muse; Lancaster; Von Korff^{[a]}; BloodPop^{[a]}	4:07
3.	"Shimmering Scars"		Muse; Lancaster; Von Korff^{[a]}; BloodPop^{[a]}	4:28
4.	"Cryogen"		Muse; Lancaster; Von Korff^{[a]}	5:01
5.	"Be with You"		Muse; Lancaster; Von Korff^{[a]}	3:35
6.	"Hexagons"	Bellamy	Muse; Von Korff	5:26
7.	"The Sickness in You & I"		Muse; Lancaster; Von Korff^{[a]}; BloodPop^{[a]}	4:17
8.	"Unravelling"	Bellamy; Lancaster	Muse; Lancaster; Von Korff^{[a]}	3:58
9.	"Hush" (with Ellie Goulding)	Bellamy; Lancaster; Nicholas Gale; Richard Boardman; Theo Hutchcraft	Muse; Lancaster; Von Korff^{[a]}	3:56
10.	"Space Debris"	Bellamy	Muse; Lancaster; Von Korff^{[a]}	5:23
Total length:				45:27

=== Notes ===
- ^{^[a]} signifies an additional producer.

== Personnel ==
Credits are adapted from Tidal.

=== Muse ===
- Matt Bellamy – vocals, guitar, keyboards (all tracks); choir arrangement (tracks 1–3, 10), string arrangement (1, 2), orchestration (1), art direction
- Dominic Howard – drums, art direction
- Chris Wolstenholme – bass, backing vocals (all tracks); engineering (1–5), art direction

=== Additional musicians ===
- Crouch End Festival Chorus – choir vocals (1–3, 10)
  - David Temple – choir conductor
  - Jason Carr – choir arrangement
  - Alex Helfrecht – alto vocals
  - Alice Jeffery – alto vocals
  - Alison Brister – alto vocals
  - Becky Claye – alto vocals
  - Beth Horn – alto vocals
  - Bethany Burrow – alto vocals
  - Caroline Milton – alto vocals
  - Charlotte Halliday – alto vocals
  - Diana Parkinson – alto vocals
  - Emma Kingsley – alto vocals
  - Eugenie Aitchison – alto vocals
  - Hannah Leonard – alto vocals
  - Natalie Fine – alto vocals
  - Paula Miller – alto vocals
  - Sarah Elliot – alto vocals
  - Tina Burnett – alto vocals
  - Alistair Scott – bass vocals
  - Alistair Yates – bass vocals
  - Christopher Wetherall – bass vocals
  - David Hodgson – bass vocals
  - Duncan McAlpine – bass vocals
  - Duncan Sim – bass vocals
  - Jonathan Gatward – bass vocals
  - Martin Musgrave – bass vocals
  - Oliver Davis – bass vocals
  - Philip Rashleigh – bass vocals
  - Peter Newsom – bass vocals
  - Ralph Warman – bass vocals
  - Charlotte Smith – soprano vocals
  - Clare James – soprano vocals
  - Davina Ross-Anderson – soprano vocals
  - Emily Soppet – soprano vocals
  - Genevieve Helsby – soprano vocals
  - Helen Garrison – soprano vocals
  - Imogen Rush – soprano vocals
  - Jessie Holder – soprano vocals
  - Lily Griffin – soprano vocals
  - Margaret Ellerby – soprano vocals
  - Pamela Vernon – soprano vocals
  - Rosemary Zolynski – soprano vocals
  - Roxanne Waldron – soprano vocals
  - Sarah Niblock – soprano vocals
  - Susanna Houtheusen – soprano vocals
  - Úna Yates – soprano vocals
  - Adrian Warner – tenor vocals
  - Andrew Dunn – tenor vocals
  - Craig Wilkie – tenor vocals
  - James Brown – tenor vocals
  - John Vernon – tenor vocals
  - Martin Dowling – tenor vocals
  - Pedro Ferreira – tenor vocals
  - Sean Denny – tenor vocals
  - Simon Stock – tenor vocals
  - Steve James – tenor vocals
  - Tim Foxon – tenor vocals
- London Metropolitan Orchestra – strings (1–3, 10)
  - Andy Brown – orchestral conductor
  - Anna Croad – violin
  - Ariel Lang – violin
  - Cathy Thompson – violin
  - Charlie Brown – violin
  - Charlie Lovell-Jones – violin
  - David Juritz – violin
  - Debbie Widdup – violin
  - Emma Fry – violin
  - Gavin Davies – violin
  - Guy Button – violin
  - Jeremy Isaac – violin
  - John Mills – violin
  - Jillian Trafford – violin
  - Kathy Gowers – violin
  - Marianne Haynes – violin
  - Miranda Allen – violin
  - Natalia Bonner – violin
  - Raja Halder – violin
  - Ralph De Souza – violin
  - Steve Morris – violin
  - Thom Gould – violin
  - Tom Bowes – violin
  - Andy Parker – viola
  - Bruce White – viola
  - Edward Vanderspar – viola
  - Garfield Jackson – viola
  - Jordan Bergmans – viola
  - Katie Wilkinson – viola
  - Mike Briggs – viola
  - Úna Palliser – viola
  - Caroline Dale – cello
  - David Daniels – cello
  - Emma Pritchard – cello
  - Katherine Jenkinson – cello
  - Nathanial Boyd – cello
  - Nick Cooper – cello
  - David Ayre – double bass
  - Laurence Ungless – double bass
  - Mary Scully – double bass
  - Steve Williams – double bass
- Dan Lancaster – programming (1, 2, 4, 6, 8, 9), additional backing vocals (1, 2, 4, 6, 9), backing vocals (5, 8), additional percussion (6)
- Bingham Bellamy – additional percussion (1)
- Matt Slater – orchestration (1)
- Lovella Bellamy – backing vocals (2)
- Poppy Tjoeng – backing vocals (2)
- Tobias Tjoeng – backing vocals (2)
- Rachel Lancaster – vocal solo (3)
- Aleks von Korff – additional percussion (6)
- Chris Whitemeyer – additional percussion (6)
- Tom Kirk – additional percussion (6)
- Ellie Goulding – vocals (9)

=== Technical and visuals ===
- Aleks von Korff – engineering (1, 2, 4–6, 8, 9)
- Dan Hayden – engineering assistance (1, 2, 4, 9)
- Ed Farrell – engineering assistance (1, 2, 4, 9)
- Dan Lancaster – mixing (1, 2, 4–6, 8, 9), mastering (9)
- Rhys May – mixing assistance (1, 2, 4–6, 8, 9), vocal engineering assistance (1, 2, 4, 6, 9), digital editing (1, 2, 4, 6, 9), engineering assistance (5)
- Cameron Johnston-Ushijima – engineering assistance (5)
- Marc Doten – engineering assistance (5)
- Tom Ashpitel – engineering assistance (8)
- Chris Gehringer – mastering (1, 2, 4–6, 8)
- Will Quinnell – mastering assistance (1, 2, 4, 6)
- Chris Whitemeyer – studio assistance (1, 2, 4, 6, 9)
- Thomas Briggs – studio assistance (8)
- Jesse Lee Stout – creative direction, art direction
- Mindreader – graphic design

== Charts ==
Chart performance for The Wow! Signal
Chart (2026)	Peak position
Australian Albums (ARIA)	2
Austrian Albums (Ö3 Austria)	1
Belgian Albums (Ultratop Flanders)	1
Belgian Albums (Ultratop Wallonia)	1
Canadian Albums (Billboard)	31
Croatian International Albums (HDU)	1
Dutch Albums (Album Top 100)	1
Finnish Albums (Suomen virallinen lista)	2
French Albums (SNEP)	1
French Rock & Metal Albums (SNEP)	1
German Albums (Offizielle Top 100)	3
German Rock & Metal Albums (Offizielle Top 100)	2
Greek Albums (IFPI)	3
Hungarian Albums (MAHASZ)	3
Irish Albums (Official Charts)	8
Italian Albums (FIMI)	3
Japanese Albums (Oricon)	39
Japanese Digital Albums (Oricon)	10
Japanese Download Albums (Billboard Japan)	8
Japanese Top Albums Sales (Billboard Japan)	41
Lithuanian Albums (AGATA)	76
New Zealand Albums (RMNZ)	5
Norwegian Albums (IFPI Norge)	21
Norwegian Rock Albums (IFPI Norge)	1
Polish Albums (ZPAV)	24
Portuguese Albums (AFP)	10
Scottish Albums (Official Charts)	1
Spanish Albums (Promusicae)	4
Swedish Albums (Sverigetopplistan)	57
Swiss Albums (Schweizer Hitparade)	1
UK Albums (Official Charts)	1
UK Rock & Metal Albums (Official Charts)	1
US Billboard 200	41
US Top Rock & Alternative Albums (Billboard)	10
