= Christoph Bull =

German composer, musician and educator

- Born: August 27, 1966 (age 59); Mannheim, West Germany
- Occupations: Organist, composer, educator
- Website: christophbull.com

Christoph Bull (born August 27, 1966) is a German organist, composer and educator based in Los Angeles. He recorded First & Grand (2010), which was described by KCRW as the first commercial album to feature the pipe organ of Walt Disney Concert Hall. He is affiliated with the UCLA Herb Alpert School of Music and has served as organist-in-residence at the First Congregational Church of Los Angeles.

== Early life and education ==
Bull was born in Mannheim, Germany. He studied at the University of Church Music in Heidelberg and the Hochschule für Musik Freiburg, and attended the Berklee College of Music. He later studied at the University of Southern California and the American Conservatory of Music.

== Career ==
Bull has performed as a concert organist and has been associated with UCLA as a university organist and teacher.

=== First & Grand ===
In 2011, KCRW described Bull's First & Grand as the first CD to feature the pipe organ at Walt Disney Concert Hall.

=== Organica ===
Bull developed Organica, a performance format combining organ music with collaborators from other disciplines.

=== Film and television ===
Bull performed pipe organ parts for the soundtrack to the 2016 film Ghostbusters, recorded at the First Congregational Church of Los Angeles.

== Selected works ==
- First & Grand (2010)
