= Renegades (One Ok Rock song) =

Single by One Ok Rock

from the album Luxury Disease and Rurouni Kenshin Saishūshō: The Final Soundtrack
- Released: 16 April 2021
- Recorded: February 2020
- Studio: Decoy Residential Recording Studios (Suffolk, England)
- Genre: Alternative rock; pop rock
- Length: 4:04
- Label: Fueled by Ramen
- Songwriters: Takahiro Moriuchi; Ed Sheeran; Janee Bennett; Masato Hayakawa; David Pramik
- Producers: Rob Cavallo; Pramik

One Ok Rock singles chronology
"Wasted Nights" (2019)	"Renegades" (2021)	"Broken Heart of Gold" (2021)

Audio sample
- file; help

Music video
- "Renegades" on YouTube

"Renegades" is a song by Japanese rock band One Ok Rock. The song was produced by Jamil Kazmi, written by Takahiro Moriuchi, Ed Sheeran and Masato Hayakawa of Coldrain, and was released on 16 April 2021 as the lead single from the band's tenth studio album Luxury Disease.

The song serves as the main theme for the live action film based on a manga series, Rurouni Kenshin: The Final.

An acoustic version of "Renegades" was later released onto digital and streaming platforms on 30 July 2021.

== Background ==
A week prior to the release of the single on 9 April 2021, the band shared a 30-second teaser of the music video on YouTube to hype up the release of the single, which would be slated for release on 16 April 2021.

== Composition ==
"Renegades" has been described by critics as being an alternative rock and a pop rock song.

According to NME, "Renegades" is all about conveying an urgent message that calls into question about the current state of affairs in the world around us, and this would be how "Renegades" serves as an anthem for renegades who refuse to allow their battles and passions to be ignored. In an interview with J Rock News, Moriuchi would express how the song connects to being the main theme for the Japanese blockbuster Rurouni Kenshin: The Final, in which he would say that "Renegades" relates more to the protagonist than the overarching plot of the film.

"A lightness, love, and hope that shines from within. I think those aspects really connected with our band."

In another interview which was uploaded to the official One Ok Rock YouTube channel, Moriuchi would also explain about how "Renegades" needed to hark back to more of a rock sound in order to properly convey the message of the song, which has lots of anger in it.

"I think we need to trace back to our early intentions. I think anger can only be truly expressed in rock music. So it’s our duty as rock musicians to play rock."

== Music video ==
One Ok Rock performing the song in front of a massive artificial sun within a mountainous region.

The music video for "Renegades" was released alongside the single on 16 April 2021, and was directed by Toshi Atsunori. The official video was released on the Fueled by Ramen YouTube channel, while a Japanese version of the video was released simultaneously on the band's official channel.

The video starts off with individuals in desperation, struggling and in complete despair. As the video showcases these individuals, who eventually come together to form "The Renegades" as the song describes. The band performs the song in a different setting altogether to begin with, though as the crowd forms, the cliff face openes up as the renegades walk towards the band and then back the way they came from, with the band following in tow. The frontman, Takahiro Moriuchi, singing the song as well as the other band members performing the song are then suddenly transported to a mountainous region as an artificial sun forms behind them as they sing the rest of the song, calling out to the renegades who walk towards them, before they stare at the sun and watch the band perform the final chorus as the video ends.

The two major differences in the Japanese version of the music video is that there are Japanese subtitles and in the second pre-chorus lyrics "For all the lies and the burden that they put on us / All of the times that they told us to just because" were replaced with "Surikomare nuri kasanerareta / Uso wa bokura wo nomikonda".

The Japanese video for the song surpassed 2 million views within the first 24 hours of being published. By the end of its first week, both videos (Japanese and International) would tally up to a combined total of 7.5 million views.

As of June 2024, the music videos for "Renegades" have over 55 million views on YouTube combined.

== Track listing ==
CD single
No.	Title	Length
1.	"Renegades"	4:04
2.	"Renegades - Japanese Version"	4:04

== Personnel ==
Credits are adapted from the liner notes of Luxury Disease.

One Ok Rock

- Takahiro "Taka" Moriuchi – Vocals, lyrics
- Toru Yamashita – guitar
- Ryota Kohama – bass
- Tomoya Kanki – drums

Additional personnel

- Ed Sheeran – lyrics
- Janée "Jin Jin" Bennett – lyrics, background vocals
- Masato Hayakawa – lyrics
- David Pramik – lyrics, producer
- Rob Cavallo – producer
- Doug McKean – engineering
- Ted Jensen – mastering
- Mark "Spike" Stent – mixing
- Matt Wolach – mixing assistant
- Pete Nappi – additional programming
- Andrew Wells – additional programming
- Jamie Muhoberac – keyboard
- David Campbell – orchestra arrangement
- Sasha Sirota – voice editing, vocal production

== Charts ==
=== Weekly charts ===
Weekly chart performance for "Renegades"
Chart (2021)	Peak positions
Global 200 (Billboard)	47
Japan Combined Singles (Oricon)	5
Japan Digital Singles (Oricon)	1
Japan Billboard Hot 100	4
US Alternative Digital Song Sales (Billboard)	25

=== Year-end charts ===
Year-end chart performance for "Renegades"
Chart (2021)	Position
Japan (Japan Hot 100)	85

== Certifications ==
Streaming certification for "Renegades"
Region	Certification	Certified units/sales
Japan (RIAJ)	Platinum	100,000,000^{†}
^{†} Streaming-only figures based on certification alone.
