= Wasted Nights =

Single by One Ok Rock

from the album Eye of the Storm
- Released: February 1, 2019
- Recorded: 2018
- Genre: Pop; pop rock; electropop
- Length: 3:44
- Label: A-Sketch; Fueled by Ramen
- Songwriters: Takahiro Moriuchi; Pete Nappi; Janee Bennett; Jamil Kazmi
- Producer: Pete Nappi

One Ok Rock singles chronology
"Stand Out Fit In" (2018)	"Wasted Nights" (2019)	"Renegades" (2021)

Music video
- "Wasted Nights" on YouTube "Wasted Nights" (Japanese music video) on YouTube

"Wasted Nights" is a song by Japanese rock band One Ok Rock, released as the third and last single from their ninth studio album Eye of the Storm (2019). Written by vocalist Takahiro Moriuchi with producer Pete Nappi and songwriters Janee Bennett and Jamil Kazmi, the song was released for digital download and streaming on February 1, 2019, by A-Sketch in Japan and internationally by Fueled by Ramen, serving as the theme song for the live-action film Kingdom released on April 19, 2019. Its lyrics encourage the listeners to live in the moment.

After its release, "Wasted Nights" became the most played song on Japanese radio in the first half of 2019 and peaked at number 6 on the Billboard Japan Hot 100 and at number 2 on the Oricon Digital Singles Chart. The song was supported by a music video directed by Kyle Cogan. The production portrays One Ok Rock performing with an ever-increasing storm forming beneath them, while alternating with scenes of young people hanging out at night and creating memories together living for now.

== Background and release ==
In 2015, film producer Shinzo Matsuhashi requested One Ok Rock for a theme song for a film he was developing the script of. He said in an article published by Oricon, that although it was still in the planning stages, the theme song "Wasted Nights" was an "important and indispensable pieces" for the film. Moriuchi watched the film before it was completed in order to create an image for the song's elaboration and commented that after "Wasted Nights" was finished, everyone concluded it was a good track. Matsuhashi praised the elaboration of song saying:

"I was really impressed when I first heard 'Wasted Nights', and I'm really grateful for their song that made the movie one or two times bigger. I guarantee that my soul is trembling hot".

The choice of "Wasted Nights" as the theme song for the movie Kingdom was announced during an official trailer released on January 31, 2019. The song was released as a digital single and became available for download and streaming, serving as the third single from One Ok Rock's upcoming ninth studio album titled Eye of the Storm, later released on February 13, 2019, in Japan and on February 15, 2019, internationally.

== Composition and reception ==
"Wasted Nights" was written by vocalist Moriuchi, the producer Pete Nappi, besides Janee Bennett and Jamil Kazmi. It was mastered by Ted Jensen and mixed by Serban Ghenea. The track is a pop-rock song with rock ballad elements, that lasts three minutes and forty-four seconds. It is set in the key of F major and performed in common time with a tempo of 125 beats per minute.

Moriuchi revealed that he composed "Wasted Nights" using themes like "magnificence" and "big anthem". Considered an optimistic content track, lyrically, "Wasted Nights" is about the importance of living in the present to the fullest in order not to regret past actions with thoughts like “what if?”. Neil Z. Yeung, in his AllMusic review of Eye of the Storm, called the song an anthem that "brims with optimism so thick that it's pointless to fight it". Writing for the publication Rockin'On, Tomoki Takahashi called "Wasted Nights" of a "brilliant and polished soundscape".

== Commercial performance ==
After the release of "Wasted Nights", the track became the most played song on Japanese radio in the first half of 2019. Commercially, "Wasted Nights" debuted at number 14 on the Billboard Japan Hot 100 dated February 6, 2019. The following week, the song climbed to number 6. With the release of the Kingdom film in April, the song which had fallen a few positions on the chart rose again, reaching number 9 on May 8, 2019. "Wasted Nights" remained in total for 41 non-consecutive weeks on the Billboard Japan Hot 100 in the year 2019. In addition, the song entered on two more charts published by Billboard Japan. "Wasted Nights" debuted at peak number 2 on the Download Songs chart dated February 6, 2019 and entered the Streaming Songs chart at number 22. The following week, the song climbed to number 4. On June 30, 2021, Billboard Japan reported that "Wasted Nights" had exceeded 100 million streams on the Billboard Japan Streaming Chart, making it the second One Ok Rock song to do so after "Wherever You Are" (2010).

By the Oricon charts, "Wasted Nights" entered the Digital Singles Chart, where it peaked at number 2 in the week of February 11, 2019, with sales of 17,766 digital copies in its first week of release.

== Music video ==
The music video for "Wasted Nights", directed by Kyle Cogan, with Justyn Moro credited as the director of photography and Brendan Garrett as the producer, was released on February 1, 2019, the same day as the single's release. The English language music video was released on the Fueled by Ramen YouTube channel, while the Japanese version of the video was released simultaneously on the One Ok Rock's YouTube channel.

The shootings of the music video for "Wasted Nights" took place on two non-consecutives days in November and December 2018. The video features the members of One Ok Rock, performing in front of a set, which projects a storm formation upon themselves. The band members are introduced individually while playing with water under their feet. As the video progresses, the band is featured playing along in heavy rain. These scenes are interspersed with scenes of a group of young people of different ethnicities, hanging out at night, having fun together, when one of them buys a VHS camera and starts filming them at different times in their lives.

== Live performances ==
"Wasted Nights" was included in the set list of the Eye of the Storm World Tour, which featured live performances by One Ok Rock in North America, Europe and Oceania. Additionally, the song was included in Eye of the Storm Japan Tour, later a live performance of the band, taken from this tour, was published on One Ok Rock's YouTube channel in order to promote the release of their concert film on DVD and Blu-ray Eye of the Storm Japan Tour, released on October 28, 2020. "Wasted Nights" was also part of the set list of Field of Wonder at Stadium Live Streaming, their first virtual concert on October 11, 2020 and the Day to Night Acoustic Session, an acoustic performance performed live on four dates in July 2021 at the Kawaguchiko Stellar Theater in Yamanashi, Japan.

== Credits and personnel ==
Credits and personnel adapted from Tidal.

One Ok Rock

- Takahiro "Taka" Moriuchi – lead vocals, songwriting
- Toru Yamashita – guitar
- Ryota Kohama – bass
- Tomoya Kanki – drums

Additional personnel

- Jamil Kazmi – executive producer, songwriting
- Pete Nappi – producer, songwriting
- Janee Bennett – songwriting
- Ted Jensen – mastering
- Serban Ghenea – mixing
- John Hanes – mixing engineer
- Alejandro Baima – additional recording
- Aja Grant, Alex Threat-Arowora, Candace Lacy, Charles Morgan, Erin Tyson-Lewis, G-janee Davis, JonJon Harrold, Judah Lacy, Moriah Holmes, Romaine Jones – choir
- Jonathan Decuir – choir arrangements

== Charts ==
=== Weekly charts ===
Chart (2019)	Peak position
Japan (Japan Hot 100)	6
Japan Combined Singles (Oricon)	11

=== Year-end charts ===
Chart (2019)	Peak position
Japan (Japan Hot 100)	25
Tokyo (Tokio Hot 100)	9

== Certifications ==
Certifications for "Wasted Nights"
Region	Certification	Certified units/sales
Streaming
Japan (RIAJ)	2× Platinum	200,000,000^{†}
^{†} Streaming-only figures based on certification alone.
