= Elle Evans =

American model and actress (born 1989)

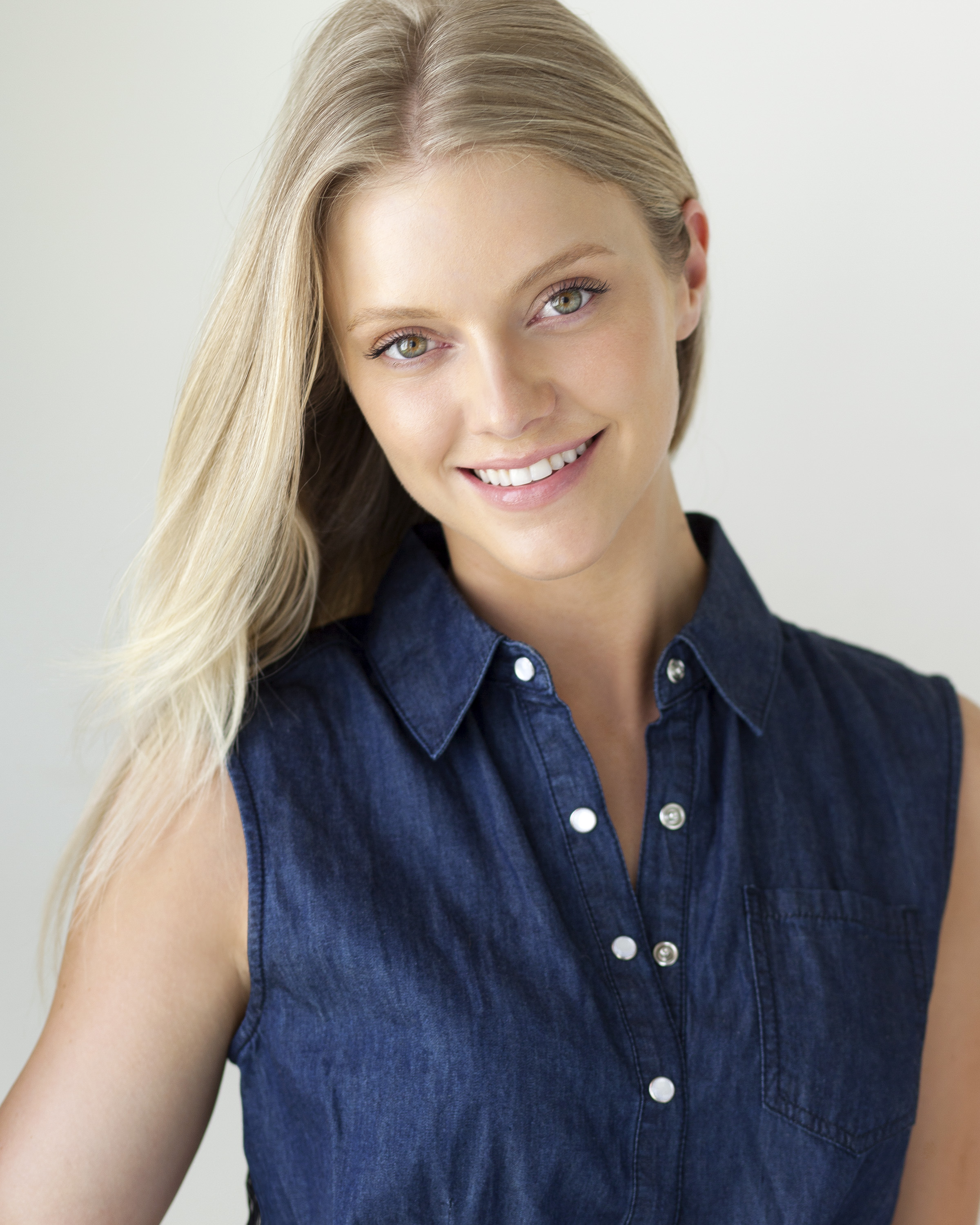
- Born: Lindsey Gayle Evans; December 9, 1989 (age 36); Paris, Texas, U.S.
- Occupations: Model; actress
- Spouse: Matt Bellamy (m. 2019; sep. 2025)
- Children: 2
- Modeling information
- Hair color: Blonde
- Manager: 3 Arts Entertainment, United Talent Agency, Agency for the Performing Arts, Wilhelmina Models

Playboy centerfold appearance
- October 2009
- Preceded by: Kimberly Phillips
- Succeeded by: Kelley Thompson

Personal details
- Height: 5 ft 10 in (1.78 m)
- Website: elleevansofficial.com

Elle Evans Bellamy (born Lindsey Gayle Evans; December 9, 1989) is an American model and actress based in Los Angeles. She appeared in the music video for the 2013 "Blurred Lines" by Robin Thicke. She is also one of the faces of NYX Cosmetics.

== Early life ==
Lindsey Gayle Evans (later known as Elle Evans) was born on December 9, 1989, in Paris, Texas, and grew up in Blanchard, Louisiana. She studied at Northwood High School and attended Northwestern State University, where she majored in broadcast journalism.

Evans is a former pageant titleholder who held the Miss Louisiana Teen USA 2008. Evans came third in the Miss Teen USA 2008 pageant. She was stripped of her title after eleven months following her arrest over an incident in a restaurant, where marijuana was found in her purse, and she and three friends were accused of not paying their bill.

Immediately after the much publicized arrest, Evans was asked to pose as a centerfold for Playboy. At the age of 19, she became Playboy Playmate of the Month for October 2009 under her legal name, Lindsey Gayle Evans. Her pictorial was photographed by Stephen Wayda.

== Career ==
In 2010, Evans was cast by MMG in her first commercial. It was shot in China, and she appeared in it styled to look like Marilyn Monroe. The commercial aired throughout Shanghai.

Evans is represented by United Talent Agency and Wilhelmina Models in Miami. She is managed by 3 Arts Entertainment and represented by Agency for the Performing Arts. In 2013, she appeared topless in Robin Thicke's music video for his single "Blurred Lines", featuring Pharrell Williams. The music video generated over 600 million views. Shortly after, Evans was cast in two Beyoncé music videos: "Haunted" and "Superpower". Both videos were directed by Jonas Akerlund in 2013.

Evans, one of the faces of NYX Cosmetics, appeared in Kmart's 2013 national ad campaign "Money Can't Buy Style", was featured in Relapse's 2013 and 2014 Photo Annual Issue, and starred in an AXE Apollo Cologne commercial that aired during the 2013 MTV Movie Awards. Evans modeled for Samuel Bayer. She was shot nude, along with 15 other models, for Bayer's exhibition "Diptychs & Triptychs". The black-and-white series of 6-foot-tall diptychs and 12-foot-tall triptychs was "to capture beauty in its most vulnerable state", and was on view at the ACE Gallery in Beverly Hills from March 2013 to April 2013.

In 2014, she guest starred in an episode of Two and a Half Men, which originally aired on February 6, 2014. Also in February, she landed the cover of FHM France. Then in September she was featured in an issue of Maxim for their "Golden Girl" spread celebrating the 50th anniversary of the film Goldfinger, in which she was painted gold. That year, Evans was cast in a Wet 'n Wild cosmetics commercial shot by director David LaChapelle titled "Steal the Look", in addition to landing two national ads for Mary Kay Cosmetics which aired during the premiere of the thirteenth season of Project Runway on Lifetime in November 2014.

In 2015, Evans appeared in a music video for the band Muse and their single, "Mercy". The video was directed by Sing J Lee and was released in June. In September, Evans was cast in a Carl's Jr. commercial for their new "Tex Mex Bacon-Thickburger". Donning a patriotic bikini to represent the ladies of Team USA, Evans faces off in a volleyball game against model Alejandra Guilmant and Team Mexico to determine if the burger is "More Tex, or more Mex." The commercial aired on September 28. Shortly after that, Evans appeared as Amber in the film Scouts Guide to the Zombie Apocalypse (2015) directed by Christopher Landon, and as Star in the horror-thriller film The Love Witch, directed by Anna Biller.

== Personal life ==
Evans dated the electronic musician Deadmau5 following her appearance in Playboy, until 2012. Evans started dating Matt Bellamy, the lead singer and guitarist of the band Muse, in February 2015. They married on August 10, 2019. Their daughter was born on June 7, 2020, and their son in May 2024. Evans is also stepmother to the son of Bellamy and his previous partner, Kate Hudson. Evans and Bellamy separated in mid-2025. The separation influenced the lyrics of the 2026 Muse album The Wow! Signal.

Dasha Astafieva	Jessica Burciaga	Jennifer Pershing	Hope Dworaczyk	Crystal McCahill	Candice Cassidy
Karissa Shannon	Kristina Shannon	Kimberly Phillips	Lindsey Gayle Evans	Kelley Thompson	Crystal Harris
