= Be with You (Muse song) =

Single by Muse

from the album The Wow! Signal
- Released: 19 March 2026
- Genre: Synth-pop; arena rock; progressive rock
- Length: 3:35
- Label: Warner
- Songwriters: Matt Bellamy; Dominic Howard; Chris Wolstenholme; Dan Lancaster
- Producers: Muse; Dan Lancaster; Aleks Von Korff

Muse singles chronology
"Unravelling" (2025)	"Be with You" (2026)	"Cryogen" (2026)

"Be with You" is a song by English rock band Muse, released as a single through Warner Records on 19 March 2026. It is the second single from the band's tenth studio album, The Wow! Signal.

== Composition and lyrics ==
Primarily a synth-pop, arena rock and progressive rock song, "Be with You" incorporates electronic elements similar to those used on previous Muse albums, such as Simulation Theory (2018). The song opens with the use of a church organ, specifically the organ of the First Congregational Church of Los Angeles. It is described as "flamboyant" and "bombastic" and is divided into three parts, with the first part opening with the church organ, the second part incorporating elements of dubstep, and the third part erupting into "guitar rock". Listeners drew comparison to other Muse songs, such as "Something Human" from the 2018 album Simulation Theory and "Invincible" from 2006's Black Holes and Revelations.

== Release ==
Muse had begun teasing the single in December 2025, delivering the single's first teaser on 24 December, featuring frontman Matt Bellamy walking through the First Congregational Church of Los Angeles before sitting at its organ and delivering a few chords before the teaser ended. The build-up to the single continued in February 2026, with the band posting cryptic teasers across social media including images of the band in the studio and various uses of morse code, culminating in a 9 March video clip which played the song's opening verse.

== Music video ==
A music video for the single was released alongside it on 19 March 2026. It stars Ella Balinska and is directed by Nico Paolillo.

== Charts ==
Weekly chart performance for "Be with You"
Chart (2026)	Peak position
Canada Mainstream Rock (Billboard Canada)	22
Canada Modern Rock (Billboard Canada)	12
Colombia Anglo Airplay (Monitor Latino)	16
Croatia International Airplay (Top lista)	100
Japan Hot Overseas (Billboard)	8
UK Singles Sales (OCC)	47
US Hot Rock & Alternative Songs (Billboard)	48
