= Cryogen (song) =

Single by Muse

from the album The Wow! Signal
- Released: 24 April 2026
- Genre: Alternative rock; hard rock; space rock
- Length: 5:03
- Label: Warner; Helium 3
- Songwriters: Matt Bellamy; Dominic Howard; Chris Wolstenholme; Dan Lancaster
- Producers: Muse; Dan Lancaster

Muse singles chronology
"Be with You" (2026)	"Cryogen" (2026)	"Hexagons" (2026)

"Cryogen" is a song by the English rock band Muse. Produced by the band along with Dan Lancaster, it was released through Warner Records on 24 April 2026 as the third single from the trio's tenth studio album The Wow! Signal.

== Background ==
In the days leading up to the release of "Cryogen", Muse teased the track through social media posts and visual imagery hinting at themes of isolation and suspended animation.

== Composition and lyrics ==
"Cryogen" blends alternative rock, hard rock, and elements of space rock into a dense and dramatic composition. The song is driven by distorted guitar riffs, pulsing bass lines, and forceful drumming, layered with atmospheric textures that create a sense of vastness and tension. The song features aggressive guitar riffs, heavy drumming, and a prominent, gritty bass tone, combined with a gothic, spacey rock sound and dynamic shifts such as a dramatic breakdown and buildup.

Lyrically, "Cryogen" conveys emotional coldness and loneliness, using imagery of freezing and polar isolation to mirror heartbreak and an inability to feel or express emotion.

== Release ==
The single premiered live during Muse's concert at O2 Academy Brixton on 3 April 2026 and was released alongside an official visualizer 3 weeks later, on 24 April. A music video for the track was released on 8 May.

== Critical reception ==
"Cryogen" received generally positive attention from music critics. Reviewers highlighted its return to a heavier, riff-oriented gothic space rock. Some critics noted the song’s resemblance to earlier material by Muse, particularly in its use of spiraling guitar riffs and dramatic vocal delivery, citing Muse's 2001 Origin of Symmetry album and its single "Plug In Baby" as examples.

== Charts ==
Weekly chart performance for "Cryogen"
Chart (2026)	Peak position
New Zealand Hot Singles (RMNZ)	40
UK Singles Sales (OCC)	36
UK Rock & Metal (Official Charts)	34
US Rock & Alternative Airplay (Billboard)	47
