= Re:make/No Scared =

Single by One Ok Rock

from the album Zankyo Reference
- Released: July 20, 2011
- Genre: Pop-punk; post-hardcore; emo
- Length: 10:36
- Label: A-Sketch
- Songwriter(s): Takahiro Moriuchi
- Producer(s): One Ok Rock

One Ok Rock singles chronology
"Answer is Near" (2011)	"Re:make/No Scared" (2011)	"The Beginning" (2012)

Audio sample
- "Re:make": file; help

Music video
- "Re:make" on YouTube "No Scared" on YouTube

"Re:make/No Scared" is the 6th single by Japanese rock band ONE OK ROCK. It was released on July 20, 2011, under A-Sketch label. It peaked at #10 on Billboard Japan Hot 100. The single also charted at 6th place on the Oricon charts and stayed for 10 weeks.

"Re:make" was used in Recochoku Co, Ltd. commercial, while "NO SCARED" was used in the Black Rock Shooter: The Game PSP video game.

== Music video ==
The music video for "Re:make" was first released on September 21, 2011, by the music label A-Sketch YouTube channel, then uploaded by the band's newly created channel in April 2012. It was directed by Suzuki Daishin, showing the band performing the track energetically in front of LED display.

On August 2, 2011, the music label channel released the music video of "No Scared", and the band uploaded it on the same day as "Re:make" in 2012. Directed by Masakazu Fukatsu, it features the band playing in studio. A recording staff is headbanging while enjoying the recording process until someone comes and taps him on the shoulder then starts headbanging too. A pizza delivery guy comes and accidentally touches the staff's hand so he joins the headbanging. He leaves the studio and nudges the people around him so that a similar incident is repeated until the whole city is headbanging together, until the song ends.

== Track listing ==
All songs were written by Taka.

No.	Title	Music	Length
1.	"Re:make"	Taka	3:25
2.	"No Scared"	Taka; Toru	3:39
3.	"Rock, Scissors, Paper"	Taka; Toru; Ryota; Tomoya	3:33
Total length:			10:36

== Personnel ==
One Ok Rock

- Takahiro "Taka" Moriuchi — lead vocals
- Toru Yamashita — lead guitar, rhythm guitar
- Ryota Kohama — bass guitar
- Tomoya Kanki — drums, percussion

Production

- Koichi Korenaga — arranger (track 1)
- Akkin — arranger (track 2)

== Charts ==
=== Single ===
Chart (2011)	Peak position
Japanese Weekly Singles (Oricon)	6

=== Songs ===
Title	Year	Peak positions
Title	Year	JPN Billboard
"Re:make"	2011	10
