= Unravelling (Muse song) =

Single by Muse

from the album The Wow! Signal
- Released: 20 June 2025
- Studio: Abbey Road (London)
- Genre: Heavy metal; EDM; progressive metal; djent; space rock
- Length: 3:58
- Label: Warner
- Songwriters: Matt Bellamy; Dan Lancaster
- Producers: Muse; Dan Lancaster; Aleks Von Korff

Muse singles chronology
"You Make Me Feel Like It's Halloween" (2022)	"Unravelling" (2025)	"Be with You" (2026)

"Unravelling" is a song by the English rock band Muse, released on 20 June 2025 as the lead single from their tenth studio album The Wow! Signal (2026). It features elements of djent, EDM synths, melodramatic rock opera vocals and progressive metal riffs. "Unravelling" was written by Matt Bellamy and the producer Dan Lancaster. Muse debuted it on their 2025 European festival tour.

== Composition ==
"Unravelling" combines synths, reminiscent of The 2nd Law and Simulation Theory, with riffs, reminiscent of Origin of Symmetry, Absolution and Drones. The song has been described as heavy metal, EDM, progressive metal, djent and space rock, while Bellamy's vocals have been described as operatic. The band travels "into a darker, djent-ier world" on the track, with an "intense mix of prog metal, metalcore and electronic music," while still sounding like Muse. It starts with "digital hums and tension" before "detonating into a riff-heavy meltdown." Critics have noted similarities to Meshuggah and Sleep Token for featuring an eight-string guitar (the first Muse song to do so) and Lancaster's production.

== Release ==
In February 2025, the bassist, Chris Wolstenholme, said Muse would work on new material in the studio in the coming months. He discussed the possibility of a 2026 release for Muse's tenth studio album. In June, before the single's release, Muse released a series of cryptic messages and clips of "Unravelling" on social media platforms.

On 12 June, Muse opened the first show of their 2025 European tour, in Helsinki, Finland, with the debut of "Unravelling". The song received its world premiere airing on 19 June at 18:30 BST during Jack Saunders' show on BBC Radio 1, followed by an interview with frontman Matt Bellamy. A day later, the song was released as a digital-only single. On 8 August, Muse released an acoustic version, the "Ghost Town Version". "Unravelling" featured as the eighth track on Muse's tenth album, The Wow! Signal, released on 26 June 2026.

== Track listing ==
Digital download
No.	Title	Writer(s)	Length
1.	"Unravelling"	Matthew Bellamy; Dan Lancaster	3:58

Digital download – acoustic version
No.	Title	Writer(s)	Length
1.	"Unravelling" (Ghost Town Version)	Matthew Bellamy; Dan Lancaster	3:31

== Charts ==
=== Weekly charts ===
Weekly chart performance for "Unravelling"
Chart (2025)	Peak position
Australia Digital Tracks (ARIA)	45
Belarus Airplay (TopHit)	121
Canada Mainstream Rock (Billboard Canada)	19
Czech Republic Modern Rock (ČNS IFPI)	11
Japan Hot Overseas (Billboard)	13
New Zealand Hot Singles (RMNZ)	34
UK Singles (Official Charts)	85
UK Rock & Metal (Official Charts)	9
US Rock & Alternative Airplay (Billboard)	8

=== Year-end charts ===
Year-end chart performance for "Unravelling"
Chart (2025)	Position
Canada Mainstream Rock (Billboard)	53
