= Eye of the Storm (One Ok Rock album) =

Studio album by One Ok Rock
- Released: February 13, 2019
- Studio: The Village Studios; The Steam Room; Hydde Studios; Sphere Studios; Sleakhouse Studios
- Genre: Pop rock; electropop; electronic rock
- Length: 42:31 (Japanese edition); 42:19 (international edition)
- Language: English; Japanese
- Label: A-Sketch; Fueled by Ramen

One Ok Rock chronology
Ambitions (2017)	Eye of the Storm (2019)	Luxury Disease (2022)

Singles from Eye of the Storm
- 1. "Change" Released: February 16, 2018; 2. "Stand Out Fit In" Released: November 22, 2018; 3. "Wasted Nights" Released: February 1, 2019

Professional ratings
Review scores
Source	Rating
AllMusic	4/5 stars

Eye of the Storm is the ninth studio album by Japanese rock band One Ok Rock. It was released on February 13, 2019, in Japan through A-Sketch, and on February 15, 2019, in other countries through Fueled by Ramen. The album marked a shift in their sound from the emo and alternative rock of their previous albums to pop and electronic music. Three singles, "Change", "Stand Out Fit In", and "Wasted Nights" have been released in support of the album.

The band announced a December European tour along with album details. The band will tour North America in support of the album from February to March 2019, with support acts Waterparks and Stand Atlantic. The band also announced that they would be opening for the Asian leg of Ed Sheeran's 2019 Divide World Tour. The album debuted at number one on the Japanese Oricon Albums Chart.

== Background ==
Vocalist Takahiro Moriuchi stated that the band "challenged and pushed ourselves to try new things while still maintaining the essence of what our band is" on the album. Moriuchi expressed a desire to create a positive album that took influence from a variety of sources, Queen being the most dominant one, but also musicals and Disney. He stated "Rock'n'roll is a lifestyle for me, not hard music, but universal – that's why this album is super different. I was just making music, not only rock music".

The second single "Stand Out Fit In" is about not giving in to peer pressure. The video for "Stand Out, Fit In", directed by Peter Huang, was praised for its portrayal of how peer pressure affects Asian American youth. He was asked to make a video about "the Asian American experience" by the Japanese band. Moriuchi wanted to be "a positive force for Asian-Americans" after moving to the United States in 2015. The song was the 48th-best-performing in 2019 on the Tokio Hot 100.

American pop singer Kiiara was brought on as a guest feature for the album, having met Moriuchi at the tribute concert for Linkin Park's late vocalist Chester Bennington. Moriuchi invited her to work with the band during a chat they had after the concert, involving Bennington's friendship with Kiiara and moving forward after his death. Linkin Park co-vocalist Mike Shinoda was also involved with production on Eye of the Storm, the band having met Shinoda in studio while working on their previous album Ambitions.

== Release ==
Along with the release of the regular Japanese and international versions, initial Japanese pressings included a DVD with acoustic performances. Despite the Japanese version being labeled as such, most of the songs are still in English, with only select verses and lines in songs being sung in Japanese.

== Track listing ==
Eye of the Storm – standard edition
No.	Title	Writer(s)	Producer(s)	Length
1.	"Eye of the Storm"	Takahiro Moriuchi; Toru Yamashita; Dan Lancaster; Mike Duce; Jamil Kazmi	Lancaster; Kyle Moorman^{[a]}	3:04
2.	"Stand Out Fit In"	Moriuchi; Derek Fuhrmann; Liam O'Donnell; Kazmi	Fuhrmann	3:34
3.	"Head High"	Moriuchi; Jason "Poo Bear" Boyd; Jared Gutstadt; Kazmi	Pete Nappi; Poo Bear^{[b]}; Gutstadt	3:27
4.	"Grow Old Die Young"	Moriuchi; CJ Baran; Ben Romans; Kazmi	Baran; Romans	3:27
5.	"Push Back"	Moriuchi; David Pramik; Michael Jade; Kazmi	Pramik	3:30
6.	"Wasted Nights"	Moriuchi; Nappi; Janée "Jin Jin" Bennett; Kazmi	Nappi	3:44
7.	"Change"	Moriuchi; Nappi; Joshua Lewis Golden; Ethan Thompson; Kazmi	Nappi	2:54
8.	"Letting Go"	Moriuchi; Moorman; Nick Long	Moorman	3:20
9.	"Worst in Me"	Moriuchi; Yamashita; Colin Brittain; Long; Kazmi	Brittain; Jonathan Gerring^{[a]}	3:10
10.	"In the Stars" (featuring Kiiara)	Moriuchi; Dan Book; Brian Howes; Kazmi	Book	3:24
11.	"Giants"	Moriuchi; Mark Crew; Bennett; Kazmi	Crew	2:44

Eye of the Storm – Japanese edition bonus tracks
No.	Title	Writer(s)	Producer(s)	Length
12.	"Can't Wait"	Moriuchi; Nappi; Long; Thompson; Kazmi	Nappi	3:20
13.	"The Last Time"	Moriuchi; Pramik; Charlie Snyder; Kazmi	Pramik	2:50
Total length:				42:31

Eye of the Storm – international edition bonus tracks
No.	Title	Writer(s)	Producer(s)	Length
12.	"Unforgettable"	Moriuchi; Andrew Goldstein; Book; J.T Roach; Kazmi	Goldstein; Book	3.16
13.	"The Last Time"	Moriuchi; Pramik; Snyder; Kazmi	Pramik	2:50
Total length:				42:19

Eye of the Storm – Japanese limited edition bonus DVD
No.	Title	Length
14.	"Wasted Nights" (Studio Jam Session Vol.4)
15.	"Change" (Studio Jam Session Vol.4)
Total length:		52:31

=== Notes ===
- ^{^[a]} denotes an additional producer
- ^{^[b]} denotes a co-producer and vocal producer

== Personnel ==
Credits adapted from the liner notes of Eye of the Storm (Japanese edition).

One Ok Rock

- Takahiro "Taka" Moriuchi – vocals, backing vocals (2)
- Toru Yamashita – guitar
- Ryota Kohama – bass guitar
- Tomoya Kanki – drums

Production

- Dan Lancaster – production (1)
- Rhys May – production assistant (1)
- Ted Jensen – mastering (1–13)
- Kyle Moorman – additional production (1), production (8)
- Adam Hawkins – mixing (1), (3)
- Derek Fuhrmann – production, additional guitar, synth, drum programming, backing vocals (2)
- Jamil Kazmi – backing vocals (2)
- Serban Ghenea – mixing (2), (6), (8)
- John Hanes – engineering (2), (6), (8)
- Pete Nappi – production (3), (6), (7), (12)
- Poo Bear – production, vocal production (3)
- Jared Gutstadt – production (3)
- CJ Baran – production (4)
- Ben Romans – production (4)
- Erik Madrid – mixing (4), (7)
- William Binderup – mix assistant (4), (7)
- David Pramik – production (5), (13), backing vocals (5)
- Alejandro Baima – assistant engineer (5)
- Neal Avrom – mixing (5), (11)
- Scott Skrzynski – mix assistant (5), (11)
- Janée "Jin Jin" Bennett – backing vocals (6), (11)
- Colin Brittain – production (9)
- Alex Prieto – engineering (9)
- Brendon Collins – engineering (9)
- Jonathan Gerring – additional production, programming (9)
- Tony Maserati – mixing (9), (10)
- Najeeb Jones – mix assistant (9), (10)
- Dan Book – production (10)
- Mark Crew – production, keyboard, programming (11)
- Dan Priddy – additional programming (11)
- Jack Duxbury – keyboard (11)
- Tom Lord-Alge – mixing (12), (13)

Additional musicians

- Erin Tyson-Lewis, Alex Threat-Arowora, Aja Grant, Moriah Holmes, Candace Lacy, Judah Lacy, Romaine Jones, Charles Morgan, JonJon Harrold, G-janee Davis – choir (2, 4, 6, 10)
- Jonathan Decuir – choir vocal arrangement
- Naoki Itai – Japanese vocals recording and editing

Design

- JonOne – cover artwork
- Kotaro Okusu, Yumeno Arai – design

== Charts ==
=== Weekly charts ===
Weekly chart performance for Eye of the Storm
Chart (2019)	Peak position
Australian Digital Albums (ARIA)	19
German Albums (Offizielle Top 100)	73
Japanese Albums (Oricon)	1
Japanese Hot Albums (Billboard)	1
Taiwanese Western Albums (G-Music)	2
UK Album Downloads (OCC)	58
US Heatseekers Albums (Billboard)	2
US Digital Albums (Billboard)	25
US Top Album Sales (Billboard)	49
US Tastemakers (Billboard)	25

=== Year-end charts ===
2019 year-end chart performance for Eye of the Storm
Chart (2019)	Position
Japanese Albums (Oricon)	8
Japanese Hot Albums (Billboard)	3

2020 year-end chart performance for Eye of the Storm
Chart (2020)	Position
Japanese Hot Albums (Billboard)	72

2025 year-end chart performance for Eye of the Storm
Chart (2025)	Position
Japanese Hot Albums (Billboard Japan)	79

=== Singles ===
Title	Year	Peak positions
Title	Year	JPN Billboard
"Change"	2018	6
"Stand Out Fit In"	2018	9
"Wasted Nights"	2019	6

=== Other charted songs ===
Title	Year	Peak positions
Title	Year	JPN Billboard
"In the Stars"	2019	19
"Eye of the Storm"	2019	43

== Certifications ==
Certifications and sales for Eye of the Storm
Region	Certification	Certified units/sales
Japan (RIAJ)	Platinum	250,000^{^}
^{^} Shipments figures based on certification alone.

== Release history ==
Release dates and formats for Eye of the Storm
Region	Date	Format(s)	Edition(s)	Label(s)	Ref.
Various	February 13, 2019	Digital download; streaming	Standard	Fueled by Ramen; Warner	
Japan	February 13, 2019	Digital download; streaming; CD	Standard	A-Sketch	
Japan	February 13, 2019	CD+DVD	Limited	A-Sketch	
Various	February 15, 2019	CD	Standard	Fueled by Ramen; Warner	
Taiwan	February 15, 2019	CD	Standard	Warner Music Taiwan	

== See also ==
- List of Oricon number-one albums of 2019
