= Dan Lancaster =

British record producer

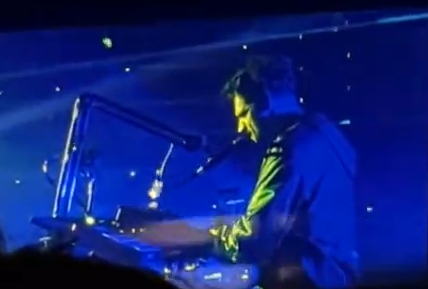
- Lancaster performing with Muse in 2023

Background information
- Born: Daniel Lancaster; London, England
- Genres: Pop; rock; heavy metal
- Occupations: Producer; mixer; writer; artist; musician
- Instruments: Vocals; guitar; keyboards; percussion
- Years active: 2009–present
- Labels: BMG; Kobalt

Dan Lancaster is an English record producer and songwriter. He is best known for his mixing and production work in contemporary rock music, and has worked with prominent global acts such as Blink-182, 5 Seconds Of Summer, Bring Me the Horizon, One OK Rock, The Warning, Lower Than Atlantis, Don Broco, Muse, A Day to Remember, Three Days Grace and The City Divided.

He is a three-time Grammy nominee for his work with Bring Me the Horizon and Blink-182, and he has twice been nominated for "Best Producer" at the Heavy Music Awards.

== Background and career beginnings ==
Lancaster is a self-taught producer and learnt by practising using a small Pro Tools production rig in his own home.

Lancaster's career in music began as the lead singer and guitarist of post-hardcore band Proceed. The band frequently toured the UK and Europe and were friends and frequent performers with UK rock band Don Broco. The band released an EP in June 2010 titled 'Curious Electric' before bassist Tom Doyle eventually left the group to join Don Broco when their former bassist, Luke Rayner, parted ways with the group in 2012.

Lancaster has cited Proceed as the inspiration behind his career in production, as he began self-producing their material which eventually led to producing for other artists. Speaking to BIMM, Lancaster stated: "I developed a skill because I had to. I invested in some [production] equipment initially just to make my own stuff sound better, and then some other people came in and said 'Hey, why don't you help us make a song?'. And then 4 years went past, I was quite deep into it, and my career was set."

== Production and mixing career ==
Lancaster's early work in production and mixing included records for Lower Than Atlantis, Oceans Ate Alaska and Mallory Knox.

In 2012, Lancaster worked with Don Broco, co-writing, producing and mixing their debut full-length album Priorities. The album peaked at #25 on the UK Album Charts, marking Lancaster's first UK Top 40 album.

In 2013 he produced, co-wrote, and mixed Lower Than Atlantis' eponymously titled fourth album, which peaked at #16 in the UK Albums Chart. The following year, he worked with Mike Duce from Lower Than Atlantis to co-write and produce the song "Heartache on the Big Screen" for 5 Seconds of Summer, a B-Side to their breakout single "She Looks So Perfect".

In 2015, Lancaster contributed production, co-writing and mixing to Don Broco's second album Automatic, obtaining his first UK Top 10 album as a producer in the process when the album peaked at #6 on the UK Album Charts. Significantly, this year gave Lancaster his big break when he was chosen to mix Bring Me the Horizon's fifth album That's the Spirit via a blind mix shoot-out. The album reached #2 in both the UK Albums Chart and US Billboard 200 when released in September 2015, while reaching number one in Australia and Canada amongst other countries.

The success of this album lead to Lancaster starting to collaborate with acts from outside the UK. He contributed mixing to Blink-182's seventh album, California (July 2016), which reached number one in both the UK Albums Chart and US Billboard 200, and is certified Gold in Australia, the United States and United Kingdom. Lancaster received his first Grammy Award nomination for his work on California when it was nominated for "Best Rock Album" at the 2017 Awards. Just a couple of months afterwards, he then worked with Japanese band One OK Rock for their single "Taking Off" as well as other tracks on their album "Ambitions", which reached #1 on the Weekly Oricon Albums Chart, bringing with it Lancaster's third album to go number one in at least one country, and his first number one in Japan.

Between 2016 and 2017, Lancaster worked with a number of artists, branching out into more mainstream music than his traditional clients in rock music. He co-wrote and produced Nina Nesbitt's "Chewing Gum" single from her Modern Love EP (2016), then contributed production to the Good Charlotte albumYouth Authority (2016), as well as co-writing and producing three tracks for Fenech-Soler's third album Zilla (2017).

Lancaster worked closely with long-term collaborators Lower Than Atlantis and Don Broco throughout the 2017-2018 period. He was involved in the recording, producing and mixing of Lower Than Atlantis' fifth album, February 2017's Safe in Sound, with writing credits on this album for "Had Enough", "Dumb", "Long Time Coming" and "Work For It". He then worked with Don Broco for the third album running, recording, co-writing, producing, and mixingTechnology, released 2 February 2018. The album peaked at #5 on the UK Albums Chart; their most successful album to date. Other projects completed in this time include mixing the songs "American Attraction" and "Casualty" from Anti-Flag's tenth album American Fall (November 2017), Hollywood Undead's fifth albumV, and mixing the songs "Lovesick", "Heartbroken", and "Midnight" from You Are Someone Else (March 2018), the debut album by British indie-pop band Fickle Friends.

In 2019 Lancaster grew a particularly close relationship with Bring Me the Horizon. Having mixed their 2015 album That's the Spirit, Lancaster was retained to mix their sixth album "amo" released in January 2019. amo debuted at #1 in Australia and the UK, a second time in the former and a first in the latter for the group. amo earned Lancaster his second and third Grammy nominations, as promotional single "MANTRA" was nominated for "Best Rock Song" at the 2018 awards, and the album was nominated for "Best Rock Album" at the 2019 awards. When Bring Me the Horizon were commissioned to write a song for the soundtrack to Hideo Kojima's video game Death Stranding, Lancaster was again drafted in to provide additional production and mixing to "Ludens", all of which was completed in a mixture of a studio and hotel room in Bologna, Italy while the band were on tour, with a deadline of just a few hours at times in the mixing stage. Finally, Lancaster mixed the group's experimental Music to Listen To... EP, released unannounced on 27 December 2019.

2019 also saw Lancaster work for a number of artists both with an existing relationship with himself and with new clients. Lancaster mixed A Day to Remember's single "Resentment" from their seventh album You're Welcome, and he co-wrote, produced and mixed the title track of One OK Rock's ninth album Eye of the Storm, which was once again a #1 album in Japan. The making of "Eye of the Storm" was the subject of a promotional video made by YouTube Music. He continued to work with Don Broco by mixing the standalone single "HALF MAN HALF GOD" as well co-writing, producing and mixing their super-group single "ACTION" which featured Takahiro Moriuchi (One OK Rock), Tyler Carter (formerly of Issues), Caleb Shomo (Beartooth) and Tilian Peason (Dance Gavin Dance). He mixed tracks for YONAKA's debut album Don't Wait 'Til Tomorrow, and mixed American rock band STARSET's third album DIVISIONS.

In 2020, Lancaster began his year by once again working with Bring Me the Horizon, this time mixing the lead single "Parasite Eve" from their October 2020 EP Post Human: Survival Horror. Lancaster was the subject of an episode of a documentary that the band filmed to showcase the challenges of making music remotely during the COVID-19 pandemic lockdown measures put in place in the UK. Lancaster contributed mixing to Enter Shikari's sixth album Nothing Is True & Everything Is Possible, which peaked at #2 in the UK Albums Chart, as well as mixing for British rock band The Hunna. In June 2020 Lancaster worked with Oli Sykes of Bring Me the Horizon and Brazilian model Alissa Salls to produce and mix "Like", the debut single of Salls' artist project Alissic.

In 2021, Lancaster worked once again with One OK Rock, this time to co-write, produce and mix their single 'Broken Heart of Gold', which was written for the movie Ruroni Kenshin: The Beginning, released in Japan on 23 April, with a global release date set for 30 July 2021. During a documentary showing the making of the single, singer Takahiro Moriuchi commented on his long-term relationship with Lancaster, stating: "Dan Lancaster is a sweetheart, and also he is really talented. Me and Dan are totally in understanding of each other." In 2022, Lancaster mixed the single "Won't Stand Down" by the rock band Muse. He then joined the band as their new touring member starting with the Will of the People World Tour in May 2022, replacing longtime touring member Morgan Nicholls, providing additional keyboards, percussion, backing vocals, and guitar. While on this tour in 2023, Dan met rock band The Warning who opened for Muse in Mexico and the UK. This connection resulted in him co-writing and co-producing 3 tracks from the band's 2023 album Keep Me Fed. Lancaster produced and co-wrote the majority of the tracks on Muse's tenth studio album, The Wow! Signal (2026), with bandleader Matt Bellamy praising Lancaster for helping push the band to create a more modern and "fresh" sound.

== Solo work ==
Since the end of his previous project with post-hardcore band Proceed in 2012, Lancaster began posting clips of his own solo music on his Instagram in 2016. After multiple clips of teaser footage for new music, Lancaster released his debut solo single "Move A Mountain" in August 2018 via Raw Kingdom with support from AWAL. The track received a positive critical reception from Rock Sound and Kerrang! amongst others, with Robin Murray of Clash writing: "It's an expertly pieced together track, with the songwriter using the full force of his experience and expertise. The start of something new, something special."

Lancaster followed "Move a Mountain" with single "Wild Life" in September 2018, before his debut solo headline show at Oslo in London in October 2018. In May 2019, Lancaster embarked on his first tours as a solo artist. He supported Lower Than Atlantis' on their farewell UK tour, with performances at Manchester Academy, Birmingham O2 Academy and Brixton Academy in London. At the Birmingham leg of the tour, Lancaster was brought in by the group to be their emergency stand-in vocalist for the show, after singer Mike Duce had lost his voice at the show in Manchester the night before.

Lancaster followed this tour immediately by supporting long-term collaborators One OK Rock in mainland Europe on their May 2019 tour with fellow support act Anteros. Lancaster often appeared on stage with the band during their performances to perform songs he'd co-written with the group, such as "Taking Off". In June 2019 Lancaster released a double-single, "I Tried" and "Phases", followed by the release of "Stay Away" in July 2019. In May 2021, Lancaster signed a publishing deal with BMG, to allow him to continue to write and produce for other artists as well as continue to work on his own music.

== Discography ==
| Year | Title | Label | Format |
| 2010 | Curious Electric* | Self-Release | EP |
| 2018 | Move a Mountain | Raw Kingdom / AWAL | Non-Album Single |
| 2018 | Wild Life | Raw Kingdom / AWAL | Non-Album Single |
| 2018 | Heartless | RAM Records | Feature Vocals for Bad Company UK |
| 2019 | Move a Mountain – Stripped | Raw Kingdom | Non-Album Single |
| 2019 | Phases | Raw Kingdom / AWAL | Non-Album Single (Double Release) |
| 2019 | I Tried | Raw Kingdom / AWAL | Non-Album Single (Double Release) |
| 2019 | Stay Away | Raw Kingdom / AWAL | Non-Album Single |

*With Proceed

== Full production/songwriting/mixing credits ==
| Year | Artist | Track(s) | Album | Label | Role | Notes |
|---|---|---|---|---|---|---|
| 2010 | Lower Than Atlantis | All Tracks | Far Q | A Wolf at Your Door | Producer / Mixer | |
| 2012 | Oceans Ate Alaska | All Tracks | Into The Deep – EP | Icon Music | Producer / Mixer | |
| 2012 | Don Broco | All Tracks | Priorities | Search & Destroy / Sony | Producer / Mixer / Songwriter | UK Top 40 Album |
| 2013 | Little Mix | Little Me (Unplugged) | Salute (Deluxe Edition) | Syco / Sony | Mixer | From the Top 6 Billboard 200 US Album – From the Top 5 UK Album – Album Certified Platinum in the UK |
| 2013 | Don Broco | You Wanna Know | Automatic | Sony | Co-Producer / Songwriter / Mixer / Programming | Top 40 UK Singles Chart – Dan P Carter's 'Rockest Record' on BBC Radio 1 |
| 2013 | Mallory Knox | All Tracks | Signals | A Wolf at the Door | Producer / Mixer | |
| 2013 | Mallory Knox | Maps | Signals (Deluxe Edition) | A Wolf at the Door | Producer / Mixer | |
| 2013 | Mallory Knox | Lights | Signals (Deluxe Edition) | A Wolf at the Door | Producer / Mixer | |
| 2013 | Mallory Knox | Oceans | Signals (Deluxe Edition) | A Wolf at the Door | Producer / Mixer | |
| 2014 | 5SOS | Heartache on the Big Screen | LIVESOS | Capitol / Universal | Songwriter | From their live album 'LIVESOS' that debuted at Number 13 US Billboard Top 200 |
| 2014 | Don Broco | Money, Power, Fame | Automatic | Sony | Co-Producer / Songwriter / Mixer / Programming | Dan P Carter's 'Rockest Record': BBC Radio 1 |
| 2014 | Lower Than Atlantis | All Tracks | Lower Than Atlantis | Easy Life / Sony | Producer / Songwriter / Mixer / Backing Vocals / Programming | Sold 50,000 copies worldwide – Top 15 UK album. |
| 2014 | Lower Than Atlantis | I'm Partying | Lower Than Atlantis: The Black Edition | Easy Life / Sony | Producer / Songwriter / Mixer / Backing Vocals / Programming | Sold 50,000 copies worldwide – Top 15 UK album. |
| 2014 | Lower Than Atlantis | Superhero | Lower Than Atlantis: The Black Edition | Easy Life / Sony | Producer / Songwriter / Mixer / Backing Vocals / Programming | Sold 50,000 copies worldwide – Top 15 UK album. |
| 2014 | Lower Than Atlantis | Sewer Side | Lower Than Atlantis: The Black Edition | Easy Life / Sony | Producer / Songwriter / Mixer / Backing Vocals / Programming | Sold 50,000 copies worldwide – Top 15 UK album. |
| 2014 | 5SOS | Heartache on the Big Screen | She Looks So Perfect EP | Capitol / Universal | Producer / Songwriter / Mixer / Backing Vocals / Programming | Featured on 5 Seconds of Summer UK Number 1 EP |
| 2015 | Lower Than Atlantis | Get Over It | Lower Than Atlantis: The Black Edition | Easy Life / Sony | Producer / Songwriter / Mixer / Backing Vocals / Programming | Annie Mac 'Hottest Record in the World': BBC Radio 1 |
| 2015 | Bring Me the Horizon | All Tracks | That's The Spirit | RCA / Sony | Mixer | Top 2 Album in the United States, UK, Canada, and Australia – The Album has sold over 1M copies Worldwide – Album certified Gold in the UK and Australia |
| 2015 | Strange Bones | S.O.I.A | S.O.I.A – EP | Northern Rats / Kobalt | Mixer | |
| 2015 | Crooks | All Tracks | Are We All the Same Distance Apart | Equal Vision | Producer / Mixer | |
| 2015 | The Ordinary Boys | All Tracks | The Ordinary Boys | Treat Yourself Records | Mixer | |
| 2015 | Don Broco | Automatic | Automatic | Epic / Sony | Songwriter / Additional Production / Programming | UK Top 10 Album |
| 2015 | Don Broco | Superlove | Automatic | Epic / Sony | Songwriter / Additional Production / Programming | UK Top 10 Album |
| 2015 | Don Broco | Fire | Automatic | Epic / Sony | Songwriter / Additional Production / Programming | UK Top 10 Album |
| 2015 | Don Broco | Keep on Pushing | Automatic | Epic / Sony | Songwriter / Additional Production / Programming | UK Top 10 Album |
| 2015 | Don Broco | Wrong Place, Wrong Time | Automatic | Epic / Sony | Songwriter / Additional Production / Programming | UK Top 10 Album |
| 2016 | One OK Rock | I Was King | Ambitions | Fueled By Ramen / Warner | Mixer | |
| 2016 | Lower Than Atlantis | Work For It | Safe in Sound | Easy Life / Sony | Producer / Songwriter / Mixer / Backing Vocals / Programming | Annie Mac 'Hottest Record in the World': BBC Radio 1 |
| 2016 | One OK Rock | Taking Off | Ambitions | Fueled By Ramen / Warner | Producer / Songwriter / Mixer / Backing Vocals / Programming | Number 1 Single in Japan – Featured in Japanese film 'Museum' – Featured in Apple TV advert in Japan. |
| 2016 | Fenech-Soler | Kaleidoscope | Zilla | SO Recordings | Songwriter / Co-Producer | |
| 2016 | Don Broco | Everybody | Technology | SharpTone | Songwriter / Mixer | |
| 2016 | Blink-182 | California | California | BMG | Mixer | Nominated for 'Best Rock Album' at 59th Grammy Awards in 2017 – Number 1 in the United States and Canada and Blink-182's first UK Number 1 Album – Top 10 Album in Australia, Austria, Belgium, Germany, Italy, Ireland, New Zealand, and Switzerland – Album Certified Gold in the US, UK and Australia |
| 2016 | Blink-182 | Left Alone | California | BMG | Mixer | Nominated for 'Best Rock Album' at 59th Grammy Awards in 2017 – Number 1 in the United States and Canada and Blink-182's first UK Number 1 Album – Top 10 Album in Australia, Austria, Belgium, Germany, Italy, Ireland, New Zealand, and Switzerland – Album Certified Gold in the US, UK and Australia |
| 2016 | Strange Bones | God Save The Teen | S.O.I.A – EP | Northern Rats / Kobalt | Mixer | |
| 2016 | Good Charlotte | 40 Oz Dream | Youth Authority | MDDN / Kobalt | Mixer | Number 1 Album in the Australia |
| 2016 | Nina Nesbitt | Chewing Gum | Modern Love – EP | Island / Universal | Producer / Songwriter / Programming | |
| 2017 | Don Broco | T-Shirt Song | Technology | SharpTone | Producer / Mixer / Backing Vocals / Programming | 'T-shirt Song' Annie Mac 'Hottest Record in the World': BBC Radio 1 |
| 2017 | Don Broco | Stay Ignorant | Technology | SharpTone | Producer / Mixer / Backing Vocals / Programming | 'T-shirt Song' Annie Mac 'Hottest Record in the World': BBC Radio 1 |
| 2017 | Anti-Flag | American Attraction | American Fall | Spinefarm Records | Mixer | Debuted at #17 on the Hard Rock Albums in the US – #11 on the Independent Albums in the US |
| 2017 | Anti-Flag | Casualty | American Fall | Spinefarm Records | Mixer | #10 on the Tastemakers chart in the US |
| 2017 | Hollywood Undead | All Tracks | V | MDDN/BMG | Mixer | Debuted at 2 on US Top Alternative Albums (Billboard) – Debuted at 3 on US Top Rock Albums (Billboard) – Debuted at 22 on Billboard 200 album chart in US – Top 20 Album in the Austria, Canada, Czech Republic, Finland, New Zealand |
| 2017 | Don Broco | Technology | Technology | SharpTone | Producer / Songwriter / Mixer / Backing Vocals / Programming | Dan P Carter's 'Rockest Record': BBC Radio 1 |
| 2017 | Don Broco | Pretty | Technology | SharpTone | Producer / Mixer / Backing Vocals / Programming | |
| 2017 | Polyphia | All Tracks | The Most Hated – EP | Sony Japan | Mixer | |
| 2017 | Frank Carter & The Rattlesnakes | Lullaby | Lullaby (Radio Mix) | International Death Cult / Kobalt | Mixer | BBC Radio 1 Playlist |
| 2017 | Blink-182 | Hey, I'm Sorry | California (Deluxe Edition) | BMG | Mixer | |
| 2017 | Lower Than Atlantis | All Tracks | Safe in Sound | Easy Life / Sony | Producer / Songwriter / Mixer / Backing Vocals / Programming | UK Top 10 Album |
| 2017 | One OK Rock | Bombs Away | Ambitions | Fueled By Ramen / Warner | Mixer | Japanese Number 1 album – selling over 315,000 records in its first week |
| 2017 | One OK Rock | We Are | Ambitions | Fueled By Ramen / Warner | Mixer | Japanese Number 1 album – selling over 315,000 records in its first week |
| 2017 | One OK Rock | 20/20 | Ambitions | Fueled By Ramen / Warner | Mixer | Japanese Number 1 album – selling over 315,000 records in its first week |
| 2017 | One OK Rock | Listen (feat. Avril Lavigne) | Ambitions | Fueled By Ramen / Warner | Mixer | Japanese Number 1 album – selling over 315,000 records in its first week |
| 2017 | One OK Rock | Bon Voyage | Ambitions | Fueled By Ramen / Warner | Mixer | Japanese Number 1 album – selling over 315,000 records in its first week |
| 2017 | One OK Rock | Take What You Want (feat. 5 Seconds of Summer) | Ambitions | Fueled By Ramen / Warner | Mixer | Japanese Number 1 album – selling over 315,000 records in its first week |
| 2017 | Fenech-Soler | Touch | Zilla | SO Recordings | Songwriter / Co-Producer | |
| 2017 | Fenech-Soler | Conversation | Zilla | SO Recordings | Songwriter / Co-Producer | |
| 2018 | Fickle Friends | Lovesick | You Are Someone Else | Polydor | Mixer | UK Top 10 Album |
| 2018 | Fickle Friends | Heartbroken | You Are Someone Else | Polydor | Mixer | UK Top 10 Album |
| 2018 | Fickle Friends | Midnight | You Are Someone Else | Polydor | Mixer | UK Top 10 Album |
| 2018 | Don Broco | The Blues | Technology | SharpTone | Producer / Songwriter / Mixer / Backing Vocals / Programming | Top 5 UK Album |
| 2018 | Don Broco | Tightrope | Technology | SharpTone | Producer / Mixer / Backing Vocals / Programming | Top 5 UK Album |
| 2018 | Don Broco | Greatness | Technology | SharpTone | Producer / Mixer / Backing Vocals / Programming | Top 5 UK Album |
| 2018 | Don Broco | Porkies | Technology | SharpTone | Producer / Mixer / Backing Vocals / Programming | Top 5 UK Album |
| 2018 | Don Broco | Good Listener | Technology | SharpTone | Producer / Mixer / Backing Vocals / Programming | Top 5 UK Album |
| 2018 | Don Broco | ¥ | Technology | SharpTone | Producer / Songwriter / Mixer / Backing Vocals / Programming | Top 5 UK Album |
| 2018 | Don Broco | Blood in the Water | Technology | SharpTone | Producer / Songwriter / Mixer / Backing Vocals / Programming | Top 5 UK Album |
| 2018 | Don Broco | Come Out To LA | Technology | SharpTone | Producer / Songwriter / Mixer / Backing Vocals / Programming | Top 5 UK Album |
| 2018 | STARSET | Bringing It Down (Version 2.0) | Vessels 2.0 | Fearless | Mixer | |
| 2018 | Crossfaith | All Tracks | EX_MACHINA | UNFD / Sony Japan | Mixer | Japan Top 20 Album |
| 2018 | Dir En Grey | All Tracks | The Insulated World | Okami | Mixer | Japan Top 10 Album |
| 2018 | Good Charlotte | Better Demons | Generation Rx | MDDN / BMG | Songwriting / Production | |
| 2019 | Dir En Grey | The World of Mercy | The World of Mercy – EP | Okami | Mixer | |
| 2019 | Dir En Grey | Dozing Green (Acoustic Version) | The World of Mercy – EP | Okami | Mixer | |
| 2019 | Bring Me the Horizon | Ludens | POST HUMAN : SURVIVAL HORROR – EP | RCA / Sony | Additional Production / Mixing | Featured on the soundtrack of Hideo Kojima game Death Stranding |
| 2019 | Bring Me the Horizon | All Tracks | Music To Listen To... – EP | RCA / Sony | Mixer | |
| 2019 | Bring Me the Horizon | All Tracks | amo | RCA / Sony | Mixer | UK & Australia Number 1 Album – UK Certified Gold – 'MANTRA' Grammy nominated for 'Best Rock Song' 2018 Awards – Album nominated for 'Best Rock Album' 2019 Grammy Awards |
| 2019 | One OK Rock | Eye of the Storm | Eye of the Storm | Fueled By Ramen / Warner | Songwriting / Production / Mixing | Japan #1 Album |
| 2019 | YONAKA | Awake | Don't Wait 'Til Tomorrow | Atlantic / Warner | Mixer | |
| 2019 | YONAKA | Guilty (For Your Love) | Don't Wait 'Til Tomorrow | Atlantic / Warner | Mixer | |
| 2019 | YONAKA | Punch Bag | Don't Wait 'Til Tomorrow | Atlantic / Warner | Mixer | |
| 2019 | YONAKA | Wake Up | Don't Wait 'Til Tomorrow | Atlantic / Warner | Mixer | |
| 2019 | YONAKA | The Cure | Don't Wait 'Til Tomorrow | Atlantic / Warner | Mixer | |
| 2019 | STARSET | All Tracks | DIVISIONS | Fearless | Mixer | US Top 10 Rock Albums |
| 2019 | A Day to Remember | Resentment | You're Welcome | Fueled By Ramen / Warner | Mixer | US Top 15 Billboard 200 Album – Australia Top 10 Album |
| 2020 | Enter Shikari | THE GREAT UNKNOWN | Nothing Is True & Everything Is Possible | SO Recordings | Mixer | UK Top 2 Album |
| 2020 | Enter Shikari | Reprise 3 | Nothing Is True & Everything Is Possible | SO Recordings | Mixer | UK Top 2 Album |
| 2020 | Enter Shikari | { The Dreamer's Hotel } | Nothing Is True & Everything Is Possible | SO Recordings | Mixer | UK Top 2 Album |
| 2020 | Enter Shikari | T.I.N.A. | Nothing Is True & Everything Is Possible | SO Recordings | Mixer | UK Top 2 Album |
| 2020 | Enter Shikari | thē kĭñg | Nothing Is True & Everything Is Possible | SO Recordings | Mixer | UK Top 2 Album |
| 2020 | Bring Me the Horizon | Parasite Eve | POST HUMAN : SURVIVAL HORROR – EP | RCA / Sony | Mixer | UK Top 40 Single – UK #1 Album |
| 2020 | The Hunna | Lost | I'd Rather Die Than Let You In | Last Minute Warriors / Believe | Songwriting / Production / Mixing | |
| 2020 | The Hunna | Anything Is Better Than Nothing | I'd Rather Die Than Let You In | Last Minute Warriors / Believe | Songwriting / Production / Mixing | |
| 2020 | The Hunna | Lost (feat. OMB Peezy | Non-Album Single | Last Minute Warriors / Believe | Songwriting / Production / Mixing | |
| 2020 | Alissic | Like | Non-Album Single | Classii | Production / Mixing | |
| 2021 | Lenny | OVERDOSED | Non-Album Single | Universal | Production / Mixing | |
| 2021 | One OK Rock | Broken Heart of Gold | Non-Album Single | Fueled By Ramen / Warner | Songwriting / Production / Mixing | Featured in the movie Ruroni Kenshin: The Beginning |
| 2021 | AlienBlaze | Broken Hearted Or What? | Non-Album Single | Raw Kingdom | Songwriting / Production / Mixing | |
| 2021 | The Maine | Select Tracks | XOXO: From Love and Anxiety in Real Time | 8123 / Photo Finish | Mixing | |
| 2022 | Muse | Won't Stand Down | Will of the People | Warner | Mixing | |
| 2024 | The Warning | Six Feet Deep | Keep Me Fed | Lava Records / Republic Records | Writer / Co-producer | |
| 2024 | The Warning | Hell You Call a Dream | Keep Me Fed | Lava Records / Republic Records | Writer / Co-producer | |
| 2024 | The Warning | Automatic Sun | Keep Me Fed | Lava Records / Republic Records | Writer / Co-producer | |
| 2025 | Pendulum | Save The Cat | Inertia | Mushroom Music / Virgin Music Group | Composer | |
| 2025 | Muse | Unravelling | The Wow! Signal | Warner | Producer / Mixer / Songwriter / Backing Vocals | |
| 2025 | Three Days Grace | All tracks | Alienation | RCA | Producer | |
| 2026 | Muse | Cryogen | The Wow! Signal | Warner | Songwriter | |
| 2026 | Muse | Nightshift Superstar | The Wow! Signal | Warner | Songwriter | |
