= Tyler Acord =

American record producer and DJ

- Also known as: Lophiile; Scout; Ty
- Born: Tyler Joseph Acord; September 12, 1990 (age 35)
- Origin: Redmond, Washington, United States
- Genres: Lo-fi hip hop; R&B; dance; electronic; future bass; soul; neo-funk; hip hop; metalcore; nu metal
- Occupations: Record producer; DJ; musician; multi-instrumentalist; songwriter
- Instruments: Keyboards; synthesizers; piano; guitar; drums; percussion; digital audio workstation
- Years active: 2012–present
- Labels: Cascadian Noise; Rise; Blue Note Records
- Formerly of: Issues

Tyler Joseph Acord (born September 12, 1990), also known by his stage name Lophiile and formerly known as Scout, is an American record producer, DJ, multi-instrumentalist, and songwriter born in Lakewood, Washington. He is a member of the English-American R&B group Radiant Children and is a former member of the American metalcore band Issues.

== Early life ==
After moving to Los Angeles, Acord joined the metal band A Memoria Brooded playing drums and met Tyler Carter during his time at Atlantic Records. Together, they formed the band Issues.

== Influences and musical style ==
Born into a deeply musical family, his mother a gospel singer and his father a trumpet player and sound engineer, Acord had early introductions to Motown and soul, from classics like Stevie Wonder and Marvin Gaye to contemporary artists like Jill Scott and India Arie. He fell in love with hip-hop as a teenager, studied jazz in college, and spent three years touring as a DJ in the American metalcore band Issues, alongside his twin brother Skyler Acord, who plays bass guitar, and longtime collaborator and lead vocalist Tyler Carter.

As a solo artist, he prominently produces hip hop, dance, electronic, lo-fi, and contemporary R&B music. Acord has crafted a style heavy on bass and drawing from elements as far-ranging as hip hop, old school funk, and sample-based R&B.

Acord has written and produced for artists such as: GoldLink, H.E.R., Gallant, Ray BLK, Moss Kena, Nick Grant, Freddie Gibbs, Skrillex, and Zedd.

As a producer, he has stated that Billboard, Oliver, Whereisalex, Lido, Gravez, Tennyson, and Mxxwll influence his production.

== Career ==
=== 2012–15: Issues ===
Acord became acquainted with singer and songwriter Tyler Carter while interning at Atlantic Records. He toured with Carter as a DJ on a solo tour in the United States. After helping Carter start Issues in 2012, Acord later accepted a position in the band as a keyboardist and DJ. Acord adopted the alias Scout and pursued keys, production, and DJ for the group from 2012 to 2015, before disbanding as a permanent member. While no longer a performing member, Ty is still a session member for the band as a producer and keyboardist, having participated on their second and third albums Headspace (2016) and Beautiful Oblivion (2019).

=== 2012–present: Solo career ===
Tyler Acord moved from Tacoma, Washington to Los Angeles, California to begin pursuing a career in producing music. He first began pursuing music under the alias Scout. In the summer of 2014, he performed on the Beatport stage on the Vans Warped Tour. On August 31, 2015, Scout won Zedd's "I Want You to Know" remix contest. The following year, he adopted another alias, Lophiile. He released the song "Preach" on September 23, 2016.

He released the single "Newno", featuring American rapper Nick Grant and singer Moss Kena, on July 20, 2017.

On September 27, 2017, he released the song "left you". On November 14, Lophiile premiered the single "Off Top", featuring American rapper Freddie Gibbs, on Beats 1's radio show with Zane Lowe, and was released to critical acclaim.

On March 20, 2018, Lophiile released a song, titled "when". The following year, he released the To Forgive EP on February 21, 2019.

On September 25, 2019, he released the single "No Bus" under No Tricks/Blue Note Records.

=== 2018–present: Radiant Children ===
Radiant Children formed between three musicians, songwriters, and producers in 2016, consisting of Acord, singer Fabienne Holloway, and multi-instrumentalist Marco Bernardis, based out of London, England. Bernardis and Acord previously had collaborated with other musicians such as Gallant and Chon. The group released their debut single, "Life's a Bitch", in June 2018. They self-released their debut extended play, Tryin', on August 24, 2018.

== Production credits ==
=== 2012 ===
Flo Rida – Wild Ones (Deluxe) (2012)

- "I Cry"

Issues – Black Diamonds (2012)

- "King of Amarillo"
- "Love, Sex, Riot" (featuring Fronz)
- "The Worst of Them"
- "Princeton Ave"
- "Black Diamonds"

=== 2013 ===
Issues – Issues (2013)

- "Stingray Affliction"

Issues – Guitar Hero Live GHTV Soundtrack (2013)

- "Hooligans"

Tyler Carter (2013)

- "Mirrors"

=== 2014 ===
Issues – Diamond Dreams (2014)

- "King Of Amarillo (Re-Imagined)"
- "NLYF x Neck Deep" (featuring Neck Deep)
- "Hooligans (Re-Imagined)"
- "Tears On The Runway (Re-Imagined)" (featuring Nylo)
- "The Worst Of Them (Re-Imagined)"

Issues – Issues (2014)

- "Never Lose Your Flames"
- "Disappear (Remember When)"
- "Mad at Myself"
- "The Langdon House"
- "Tears on the Runway Pt. 2" (featuring Nylo)
- "Life of a Nine"
- "Sad Ghost"
- "Late"
- "Personality Cult"
- "Old Dena"
- "The Settlement"

Fronz – Party People's Anthem (2014)

- "Turn It Up"

Tyler Carter – Leave Your Love EP (2014)

- "Tears On The Runway, Pt. 1" (featuring Nylo)
- "Georgia"

Buried in Verona – Faceless (2014)

- "Blind Eyes"

=== 2015 ===
Tyler Carter – Leave Your Love EP (2015)

- "Sophisticated"
- "So Slow"
- "Find Me"
- "Leave Your Love"

Cane Hill – Cane Hill (2015)

- "Screwtape"

Fronz – Party People's Anthem (2015)

- "Zilla"

=== 2016 ===
Issues – Headspace (2016)

- "Slow Me Down"
- "Coma"
- "Made to Last"
- "Someone Who Does"
- "Hero"
- "Rank Rider"
- "Yung & Dum" (featuring Jon Langston)
- "Lost-n-Found (On A Roll)"
- "Flojo"
- "The Realest"
- "Blue Wall"
- "I Always Knew"

Moss Kena (2016)

- "These Walls"

Tyler Carter (2016)

- "Forget You"

Sundai (2016)

- "All I Got"

Polyphia (2016)

- "LIT"

Troye Sivan – Blue Neighbourhood (Remixes) (2016)

- "Wild (Lophiile & Grey Remix)"

Nikki Hayes (2016)

- "Chance of Rain"

Zedd (2016)

- "Beautiful Now (Lophiile Remix)" (featuring Lophiile, Jon Bellion)

=== 2017 ===
H.E.R. – H.E.R. Volume 2 (2017)

- "Avenue"

Ray BLK (2017)

- "Patience (Freestyle)"

Gallant, Tablo & Eric Nam (2017)

- "Cave Me In"

Chon – Homey (2017)

- "Nayhoo" (featuring Lophiile, Masego)

Star Cast – Star: Original Soundtrack From Season 2 (2017)

- "Little Bird" (featuring Jude Demorest)

GoldLink – At What Cost (2017)

- "Summatime" (featuring Radiant Children, Wale)

VanJess – Silk Canvas (2017)

- "Through Enough" (featuring GoldLink)

Polyphia – The Most Hated (2017)

- "Goose"
- "40oz"
- "The Worst"
- "Loud"
- "Icronic"
- "Crosty"

Moss Kena (2017)

- "48" (featuring Jay Prince)

Futuristic (2017)

- "Everyday Is My Birthday"

Lophiile (2017)

- "Newno" (featuring Nick Grant, Moss Kena)
- "Off Top" (featuring Freddie Gibbs)

Mark Johns (2017)

- "Same Girl"

Gallant (2017)

- "Bourbon (Remix)" (featuring Lophiile, Saba)

OmenXIII – Moonlight (2017)

- "Vampire"

Zedd, Alessia Cara & Lophiile – Helix (Volume 1) (2017)

- "Stay (Lophiile Remix)"

Grey (2017)

- "I Miss You (Lophiile Remix)" (featuring Bahari)

=== 2018 ===
BTS – Love Yourself: Tear (2018)

- "낙원 (Paradise)"

Radiant Children – Tryin' (2018)

- "Poke Bowl"
- "Go Left"
- "Life's a Bitch"
- "Tryin'"
- "48th & 9th"

New Years Day – Unbreakable (2018)

- "Skeletons"

Zilo – The Nature Of The Beast (2018)

- "Don't Waste My Time"

MNEK – Language (2018)

- "Phone"

Tyler Carter – Moonshine (2018)

- "Pressure"
- "Focus"
- "HBSL" (featuring Ben Great)

R.LUM.R – Right Here, I Need To Know (2018)

- "Right Here"

Polyphia – New Levels New Devils (2018)

- "Death Note" (featuring Ichika)
- "Saucy"

VanJess – Silk Canvas (2018)

- "Cool Off the Rain (Interlude)"

Lophiile (2018)

- "Common Sense" (featuring Vic Mensa)

=== 2019 ===
Issues – Beautiful Oblivion (2019)

- "Drink About It"
- "Tapping Out"
- "Without You"
- "Beautiful Oblivion"
- "Downfall"
- "Get it Right"
- "Second Best"
- "Your Sake"
- "Rain"
- "Flexin"
- "No Problem (Keep it Alive)"

Alina Baraz – It Was Divine (2019)

- "To Me"

Lophiile, Col3trane & Amber Mark (2019)

- "No Bus" (featuring Amber Mark, Col3trane)

Lophiile & NSTASIA – To Forgive (2019)

- "My Side"

VanJess – Silk Canvas (The Remixes) (2019)

- "Cool Off the Rain" (featuring Ari Lennox)
- "Through Enough REMIX" (featuring MNEK)
- "Through Enough (Jarreau Vandal Remix)" (featuring GoldLink)

Cantrell – Devil Never Even Lived (2019)

- "Know It's Wrong"
- "4 Letter Word"

Lophiile – To Forgive (2019)

- "You're Gonna Need It" (with Jesse Boykins III)
- "You've Changed"
- "Late Ass
- "One Hand" (with Sophie Faith)

Damienfarron & Nikhedonia – Memetal Illness (2019)

- "TOKYO DRIP!"

Iophiile & NSTASIA (2019)

- "My Side"

=== 2020 ===
G Herbo – PTSD (2020)

- "Party in Heaven" (featuring Lil Durk)

Alina Baraz (2020)

- "Trust"

Hope Tala – Girl Eats Sun (2020)

- "Crazy"

Gallant – Our Beloved BoA (2020)

- "Only One"

Radiant Children – There's Only Being Yourself (2020)

- "Sky Mind"
- "Rare"
- "Mariposa"
- "Gently"
- "I Need Love"
- "Pretend"
- "Mind Control"
- "Jane"
- "Radio Silence"

Xavier Omär – if You Feel (2020)

- "want/need"

Jae Stephens & VanJess – And Friends - EP (2020)

- "Already On It"

Kinfolk Jon (2020)

- "Gassed" (featuring $teven Cannon, Lil Xan)

HXRY – Piece of Mind (2020)

- "MrFreeze" (featuring Jeff Doubleday)

Issues (2020)

- "Tapping Out (Stripped)"

=== 2021 ===
Emir Taha – Hoppa pt. 2 (2021)

- "Katakulli"
- "Bad Reception"

Ace Hashimoto – Play.Make.Believe. (2021)

- "Girls" (featuring pH-1)

Yasmeen Al-Mazeedi – Purple. (2021)

=== 2025 ===
Hope Tala - Hope Handwritten (2025)
- "Miracle"

== Discography ==
=== with A Memoria Brooded ===
- Human (2012)
- Conduit (2014)

=== with Issues ===
Extended plays

- Black Diamonds (2012)

Studio albums

- Issues (2014)
- Diamond Dreams (2014)
- Headspace (2016) (as session member)
- Beautiful Oblivion (2019) (as session member)

=== as Lophiile ===
Singles

- "Preach" (2016)
- "Newno", featuring Moss Kena and Nick Grant (2017)
- "Left you" (2017)
- "Off Top", featuring Freddie Gibbs (2017)
- "When" (2018)
- "No Bus" (2019)

Extended plays

- To Forgive (EP) (2019)

=== with Radiant Children ===
- Tryin (EP) (2018)
- There's Only Being Yourself (2020)

=== Remixes ===
- "I Want You to Know" (Lophiile Remix) (2015)
- "Beautiful Now" (Lophiile Remix) (2015)
- "Breathe Life" (Lophiile Remix) (2016)
- "Kiss the Sky" (Lophiile Remix) (2016)
- "Stay" (Lophiile Remix) (2017)
- "I Miss You" (Lophiile Remix) (2017)
