= Cantril =

Cantril or Cantrill may refer to:

- Cantrill (surname)
- Cantril, Iowa, United States
- Cantril Farm, now Stockbridge Village, United Kingdom, former name of Liverpool residential suburb
- Mepenzolate, by trade name Cantril
- Cantril ladder, a method of measuring happiness

== See also ==
- Cantrell
- Quantrill (disambiguation)
