= Moonshine (Tyler Carter album) =

Studio album by Tyler Carter
- Released: February 1, 2019
- Recorded: 2018
- Genre: R&B; pop; neo-soul; country pop
- Length: 38:41
- Label: Rise; Velocity
- Producer: Lophiile; Medasin; Femdouble; Maui Black; SmarterChild; Brandon Paddock

Tyler Carter chronology
Leave Your Love (2014)	Moonshine (2019)	Moonshine Acoustic (2020)

Singles from Moonshine
- 1. "Pressure" Released: June 28, 2018; 2. "Focus" Released: August 17, 2018; 3. "Moonshine" Released: November 9, 2018; 4. "Good Things" Released: January 18, 2019

Moonshine is the debut studio album by American singer-songwriter and former Issues lead vocalist Tyler Carter, released on February 1, 2019, on Velocity and Rise Records. The album is a follow-up to Carter's debut extended play (EP), Leave Your Love. It was produced by long time collaborator Lophiile, Medasin, Brandon Paddock, Femdouble, Maui Black, and SmarterChild. The album was recorded in 2018 and was written over the course of three years, between 2016 and 2018. The singer continues his unique sound of soul, R&B, and electronic music with elements of country and pop. A companion extended play, Moonshine Acoustic, was released in June 2020.

The album was announced on January 17, 2019. The lead single, "Pressure", was released on June 28, 2018. The second single, "Focus", was released on August 17, 2018. The title-track of the album was released on November 9, 2018. The fourth and final single, "Good Things", was released on January 18, 2019. In support of the album, Tyler Carter embarked on the Moonshine Tour, which took place between January and March 2019.

== Background ==
After recording his band Issues' self-titled debut studio album in 2013, and touring internationally in support of its release, Carter began planning to release his debut solo album in 2014. He collaborated with other musicians such as blackbear, producers Boogie and Igloo, and long-time collaborator and former Issues keyboardist and disc jockey Tyler Acord, also known as Lophiile, for his debut solo project. He released his debut EP, Leave Your Love, on January 13, 2015, on Rise Records and Velocity Records, having released music videos for his songs "Georgia" and "Find Me". He continued to pursue his role as the lead vocalist in Issues, touring internationally and recording their second studio album, Headspace, throughout 2015 and 2016. As a solo artist, Carter also released a handful of covers with Luke Holland, including his cover of "Ain't It Fun" by Paramore for Punk Goes Pop Vol. 6 (2014) and "Hello" by Adele.

On July 25, 2016, Carter released his first solo single since Leave Your Love, titled "Forget You", featuring Lophiile.

In the album's announcement on his Instagram, Carter stated:

My life will be forever changed. This album has put me through so much turbulence in my life. The last couple years trying to get it right, and find the time in my career to fit this project and not neglect the other things that bring livelihood to many others. I have neglected my own dreams, but with patience and determination, and accepting the things I cannot change, putting my best foot forward, and trusting the universe, I am finally able to give you #Moonshine much of which I like to show the diversity in my music as a songwriter, but also make songs that I am passionate about, genres I love, and still take it back to Georgia where I was born and raised. I think you will taste all of these things as you listen. Thanks for believing in a small town guy, and supporting me on this journey.

== Promotion ==
On June 28, 2018, Tyler Carter released the album's lead single "Pressure", accompanied with its music video. On Instagram, Carter spoke about the song, stating "I’m actually freaking the fuck out, which is contradicting to the whole attitude of this song, but I’m insanely excited that after 2, maybe even 3 years of working on new solo music, my first single for this new me is finally out! I got a whole new perspective, and I def don’t fuck with NO PRESSURE. I’m doing what I want and what I know is dope for me. So here you go! Take it or leave it.”

On August 17, 2018, he released the second single, "Focus".

On September 27, 2018, a music video premiered for the song "Moonshine". It was officially released as the third single on November 9.

On November 26, 2018, he premiered a music video for a song titled "Good Things". It was released as the fourth single on January 18, 2019.

On June 26, 2020, Carter released the acoustic album, Moonshine Acoustic.

=== Tour ===
In support of the album, Tyler Carter announced the Moonshine Tour, on November 19, 2018. The first leg began at the Beat Kitchen in Chicago, Illinois on January 8 and concluded at Trees in Dallas, Texas on January 19, 2019, with support from R&B singer Riley.

The second leg of the Moonshine Tour was announced on February 1, 2019. The tour is set to begin on March 1 and conclude March 21, 2019.

== Track listing ==
No.	Title	Length
1.	"Moonshine"	3:23
2.	"Focus"	3:33
3.	"Good Things"	4:00
4.	"Too Tight"	3:37
5.	"Glow"	3:09
6.	"HBSL" (featuring Ben Great)	4:07
7.	"Felony"	3:57
8.	"Pressure"	2:57
9.	"Big Things"	3:11
10.	"Legend (Remember Me)"	4:00
11.	"Drown"	4:07
Total length:		38:41

== Credits and personnel ==
- Tyler Carter – lead vocals, composer, executive producer
- Erik Ron – engineer, composer
- Lophiile – producer, composer, keyboards
- Brandon Paddock – producer, engineer, guitar
- Grant Nelsen "Medasin" – composer, producer
- Femi Ojetunde "Femdouble" – composer, producer
- SmarterChild – composer, producer
- Jimmy Burney – composer
- Andrea Landis – composer
- Josh Manuel – drums
