= Moonshine Acoustic =

EP by Tyler Carter
- Released: June 26, 2020
- Recorded: 2019–20
- Genre: Neo-soul; acoustic pop; soft rock
- Length: 28:38
- Label: Rise
- Producer: ZK Productions; Chris Miller

Tyler Carter chronology
Moonshine (2019)	Moonshine Acoustic (2020)

Singles from Moonshine Acoustic
- 1. "Landslide" Released: June 12, 2020; 2. "Escape My Love" Released: June 19, 2020

Moonshine Acoustic is the second extended play (EP) by American singer-songwriter and former Issues frontman Tyler Carter. Released on June 26, 2020 on Rise Records, the EP is composed of six acoustic revisions of tracks from Carter's debut studio album, Moonshine (2019), including one studio cover of "Landslide" by Fleetwood Mac and one previously unreleased original song.

== Background ==
Following the release of Tyler Carter's debut studio album, Moonshine, on February 1, 2019, the singer embarked on two North American tours in support of its release, each in January and March 2019. Carter subsequently focused on recording and writing the album Beautiful Oblivion for his band Issues, which was later released in October 2019.

== Promotion ==
On June 10, 2020, Tyler Carter announced he would be releasing a cover of Fleetwood Mac's 1975 single "Landslide". On June 12, he released "Landslide", accompanied with its music video.

On June 19, 2020, he released the second single, "Escape My Love", a previously unreleased acoustic pop song.

== Track listing ==
All track titles and duration information was taken from Apple Music.

No.	Title	Length
1.	"Drown (Acoustic Version)"	4:39
2.	"Escape My Love"	3:40
3.	"Landslide"	3:45
4.	"Too Tight"	3:43
5.	"Glow"	3:01
6.	"Moonshine"	4:14
7.	"Good Things"	4:06
8.	"Focus"	2:50
Total length:		28:38

== Credits ==
- Tyler Carter – vocals
- Chris Miller – guitar, composer
- Zack Odom – composer
- Kenneth Mount – composer
- ZK Productions – producer
