= Leave Your Love =

EP by Tyler Carter
- Released: January 13, 2015
- Recorded: 2013–2014
- Genre: R&B; pop
- Label: Rise; Velocity
- Producer: Scout; Mat Musto; Boogie; Igloo

Tyler Carter chronology
Leave Your Love (2015)	Moonshine (2019)

Singles from Leave Your Love
- 1. "Georgia" Released: December 16, 2014; 2. "Leave Your Love" Released: December 22, 2014; 3. "Find Me" Released: February 26, 2015

Leave Your Love is the debut EP release by American singer-songwriter and former Issues clean vocalist Tyler Carter, which was released on January 13, 2015 through Rise Records. The lead single, "Georgia" was released on December 16, 2014 through Rise Records along with a music video. "Tears on the Runway Pt. 1", featuring recording artist Nylo, was released as a promotional single on December 19. The title track, "Leave Your Love" was released as a single along with a music video on December 22, 2014. On February 26, 2015, Tyler uploaded the music video for the third and final single off the EP, "Find Me".

== Track listing ==
All track titles and duration information was taken from iTunes Store.

No.	Title	Length
1.	"Sophisticated"	3:48
2.	"Leave Your Love"	3:37
3.	"Georgia"	4:20
4.	"So Slow"	4:19
5.	"Tears on the Runway Pt. 1" (featuring Nylo)	3:01
6.	"Find Me"	4:11
Total length:		23:36

== Personnel ==
- Tyler Carter – vocals, songwriting on "Tears on the Runway, Pt. 1", "Leave Your Love", and "So Slow"
- Andrea "Nylo" Landis – additional vocals and songwriting on "Tears on the Runway, Pt. 1"
- Mat "blackbear" Musto – songwriting on "Leave Your Love" and "Sophisticated"; production on "Tears on the Runway, Pt. 1" and "Sophisticated"
- Ty "Scout" Acord – mixing on "Tears on the Runway, Pt. 1", "Leave Your Love", "Sophisticated" and "So Slow"; production on "Georgia", "Leave Your Love", "So Slow", and "Find Me"
- Kris Crummett – mastering on "Tears on the Runway, Pt. 1", "Leave Your Love", "Sophisticated", and "So Slow"
- Jerrol "Boogie" Wizard – production on "Leave Your Love", songwriting on "Sophisticated"
- Josh "Igloo" Monroy – production on "Find Me"

== Charts ==
Chart (2015)	Peak position
US Billboard 200	110
US Heatseekers Albums (Billboard)	1
US Independent Albums (Billboard)	6
US Top R&B/Hip-Hop Albums (Billboard)	9
