= Jon Langston =

American musician, singer and songwriter

- Birth name: Jonathan Thomas Langston
- Born: April 8, 1991 (age 34); Loganville, Georgia, U.S.
- Origin: Nashville, Tennessee, U.S.
- Genres: Country
- Occupation(s): Singer, songwriter, guitarist
- Instrument(s): vocals, singer-songwriter
- Years active: 2013–present
- Labels: EMI Nashville / 32 Bridge Entertainment
- Website: jonlangston.com

Jonathan Thomas Langston (born April 8, 1991) is an American country musician from Loganville, Georgia. He released an extended play, Showtime, with Treehouse Records, in 2015. This was his breakthrough release upon the Billboard magazine charts. His extended play, Jon Langston, was released independently in 2015. The release got better placements upon the same Billboard magazine charts.

== Early and personal life ==
Langston was born Jonathan Thomas Langston, on April 8, 1991, in Loganville, Georgia, to Rob and Kathryn Langston. He attended Gardner–Webb University to be a player on their football team, where he was sidelined due to the effects of concussions.

== Music career ==
His music career began at a show in Kennesaw, Georgia in 2013, where he was the opening act for Chase Rice. He released an independently made extended play in 2013, Runnin' on Sunshine. The extended play, Showtime, was released on May 5, 2015, with Treehouse Records. This extended play was his breakthrough release upon the Billboard magazine charts, where it peaked at No. 26 on the Top Country Albums chart, No. 22 on the Independent Albums chart, and No. 8 on the Heatseekers Albums chart. His second extended play, Jon Langston, was independently released on December 11, 2015. It placed on the same Billboard magazine charts, where this time it got No. 25 on the Top Country Albums, No. 13 on Independent Albums, and No. 1 on the Heatseekers Albums.

Langston is featured on the song "Yung and Dum" by American metalcore band Issues, taken from their second full-length album, Headspace, which was released on May 20, 2016. In February 2018 it was announced on his Instagram page that he would be signing a record deal with UMG Nashville.

In February 2018, Langston released the single "When It Comes To Loving You" which received considerable attention, and it became the second best-selling country song of the week with 21,000 copies sold. It reached No. 29 on Hot Country Songs, his second single to appear on the chart after "Right Girl Wrong Time" in 2017. In August 2018 Jon was assigned to UMG Nashville imprint EMI Records Nashville and 32 Bridge Entertainment, an imprint founded by Luke Bryan. Langston made his debut at the Grand Ole Opry on February 22, 2022. He released the single "Back Words" in 2022.

== Discography ==
=== EPs ===
List of Releases, with selected chart positions
Title	Details	Peak chart positions		
Title	Details	US Country	US Indie	US Heat
Runnin on Sunshine	Released: August 2, 2013; Label: Independent; Formats: CD, digital download	—	—	—
Showtime	Released: May 5, 2015; Label: Treehouse; Formats: CD, digital download	26	22	8
Jon Langston	Released: December 11, 2015; Label: Jon Langston; Formats: CD, digital download	25	13	1
"—" denotes releases that did not chart

=== Singles ===
Year	Title	Peak chart positions		Certifications	Album
Year	Title	US Country	US Country Airplay	Certifications	Album
2013	"Young & Reckless"	—	—		
2014	"Party Boots"	—	—		
2015	"Forever Girl"	—	—	RIAA: Gold	Jon Langston
2016	"All Eyes On Us"	—	—	RIAA: Gold	
2017	"Right Girl Wrong Time"	44	—		
2017	"Prob'ly at a Bar"	—	—		
2018	"When It Comes to Loving You"	29	59		
2019	"Now You Know"	—	35		
2022	"Back Words"	—	—		
"—" denotes releases that did not chart

=== Music videos ===
Year	Video
2013	"Forever Girl"
2014	"She's So Georgia"
2015	"'Rollin In and Rockin Out'"
2017	"Right Girl Wrong Time"
2018	"When It Comes To Loving You"
