= Acid rain (disambiguation) =

Acid rain is rain or any other form of precipitation that is unusually acidic.

Acid Rain may also refer to:

== Music ==
=== Albums ===
- Acid Rain (album), a 2002 album by Esham

=== Songs ===
- "Acid Rain" (Alexis Jordan song), 2013
- "Acid Rain" (Angra song), 2001
- "Acid Rain", by Avenged Sevenfold on their album Hail to the King
- "Acid Rain", by Cane Hill on their album Kill the Sun
- "Acid Rain", by Chance the Rapper on his album Acid Rap
- "Acid Rain", by D.R.I. on their album Definition
- "Acid Rain", by FireHouse on their album Category 5
- "Acid Rain", by Liquid Tension Experiment on their 1999 album Liquid Tension Experiment 2
- "Acid Rain", by Lorn
