= Tapping Out (song) =

2019 song by Issues

Single by Issues

from the album Beautiful Oblivion
- Released: May 3, 2019
- Recorded: 2018–2019
- Genre: Nu metal; metalcore; R&B
- Length: 3:38
- Label: Rise
- Songwriters: Skyler Acord; Tyler Carter; Joshua Manuel; AJ Rebollo; Erik Ron
- Producer: Howard Benson

Issues singles chronology
"Blue Wall" (2016)	"Tapping Out" (2019)	"Drink About It" (2019)

"Tapping Out" is a song by American metalcore band Issues, released for digital download and streaming as the lead single from their third studio album, Beautiful Oblivion, on May 3, 2019, on Rise Records. It is the group's first song to be released since the departure of vocalist Michael Bohn, as well as the second to feature vocals from AJ Rebollo, the first being their previous single "Blue Wall".

== Credits and personnel ==
=== Issues ===
- Tyler Carter – lead vocals
- AJ Rebollo – guitars, unclean vocals
- Skyler Acord – bass
- Joshua Manuel – drums, percussion

=== Additional personnel ===
- Production – Howard Benson
- Engineering – Kris Crummett, Michael Closson, Hatsukazu Inagaki, Mike Plotnikoff, Trevor Dietrich
- Mixing – Kris Crummett, Ricky Orozco
- Songwriting – Skyler Acord, Tyler Carter, Joshua Manuel, AJ Rebollo, Erik Ron
- Vocals – Tyler Carter, AJ Rebollo
- Guitar – Marc Vangool
- Drums – Jon Nicholson
- Digital editing – Paul DeCarli, Joe Rickard
- Programming – Jonathan Litten
