= Homey (album) =

Studio album by Chon
- Released: June 16, 2017
- Genre: Progressive rock
- Length: 39:20
- Label: Sumerian

Chon chronology
Grow (2015)	Homey (2017)	Chon (2019)

Professional ratings
Review scores
Source	Rating
AllMusic	3.5/5 stars

Homey is the second studio album by the American progressive rock band Chon. It was released on June 16, 2017, through Sumerian Records. It was the band's first release not to feature bassist Drew Pelisek.

== Track listing ==
Adapted from iTunes

No.	Title	Length
1.	"Sleepy Tea"	3:05
2.	"Waterslide"	3:26
3.	"Berry Streets (feat. GoYama)"	3:28
4.	"No Signal"	3:48
5.	"Checkpoint"	3:05
6.	"Nayhoo (feat. Masego & Lophiile)"	2:51
7.	"Here and There"	3:40
8.	"The Space"	2:47
9.	"Feel This Way (feat. Giraffage)"	3:43
10.	"Continue?"	4:15
11.	"Glitch (feat. ROM)"	2:05
12.	"Wave Bounce"	3:01
Total length:		39:20

== Personnel ==
Chon

- Mario Camarena – guitar
- Nathan Camarena – drums
- Erick Hansel – guitar, bass

Guest Musicians

- Brian Evans – drums (Tracks: 1, 2, 5, 12)
- Anthony Crawford – bass (Tracks: 1, 2, 4, 5, 12)
- GoYama - producer (Track 3)
- Lophiile - producer (Track 6)
- Masego - vocals (Track 6)
- Giraffage - producer (Track 9)
- ROM - producer (Track 11)

Production

- Chon – producer
- John Greenham – mastering
- Eric Palmquist – engineer, producer
