= Tyler Carter =

American singer (born 1991)

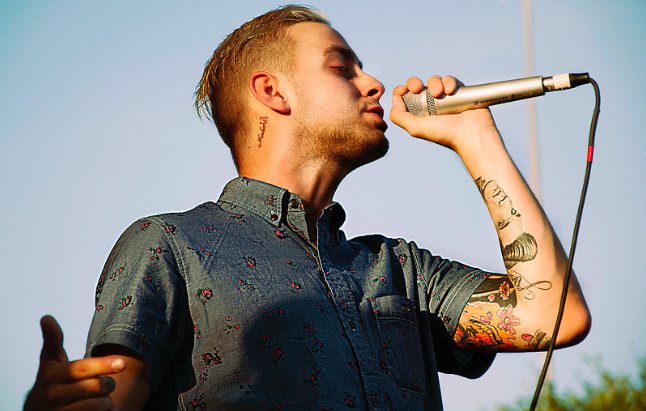
- Carter performing in 2013

Background information
- Born: Derek Tyler Carter; December 30, 1991 (age 34); Habersham County, Georgia, U.S.
- Genres: R&B; electropop; soul; pop; post-hardcore; metalcore; nu metal; rap rock
- Occupations: Singer; songwriter; record producer
- Years active: 2007–present
- Member of: The Audacity
- Formerly of: Issues; Woe, Is Me; Emerald Royce; A Path Less Traveled

Derek Tyler Carter (born December 30, 1991) is an American musician from Habersham County, Georgia. He was the lead vocalist and founding member of the metalcore band Issues (2012–2020). Carter began his music career as a drummer in local Atlanta bands before joining Woe, Is Me, with whom he released the studio album Number[s] (2010).

After leaving Woe, Is Me, he formed Issues with former bandmates, releasing the EP Black Diamonds (2012), the single "Hooligans" (2013), and three studio albums: Issues (2014), Headspace (2016), and Beautiful Oblivion (2019). Following the departure of co-vocalist Michael Bohn in 2018, Carter became the band's sole frontman until his own exit in 2020. That year, he co-founded the duo Emerald Royce with Attila's Chris Linck, followed by another band called The Audacity in 2025.

Carter's solo career includes the EPs Leave Your Love (2015) and Moonshine Acoustic (2020), and the album Moonshine (2019). He has collaborated with artists such as blackbear, MAX, Jamie's Elsewhere, Breathe Carolina, Hands Like Houses, Slaves, and One Ok Rock. He has also recorded covers with drummer Luke Holland and worked extensively with producer Tyler Acord.

== Early life ==
Derek Tyler Carter was born in Habersham County, Georgia, on December 30, 1991. While in junior high, Carter drummed for his church's band. He was active in sports while attending a military school. After high school, his close friend and musical partner Rachel Glenn Reece was killed by a drunk driver, leading Carter to abandon his music career to attend college, studying psychology. He returned to bands a few years later, dropping out of college to return to music full-time when Woe, Is Me was offered a record contract in 2009.

== Career ==
=== 2008–2009: A Path Less Traveled ===
Carter joined the metalcore band A Path Less Traveled in 2008. He began pursuing an interest in mixing post-hardcore and metalcore elements with electronic and pop influences, which would show in Carter's future musical projects. In A Path Less Traveled, he became acquainted with vocalist Michael Bohn, who would co-front bands with Carter in the future. A Path Less Traveled released their debut extended play, From Here On Out, in 2009, selling over 500 copies. The following year, Carter departed from A Path Less Traveled and began working with Woe, Is Me.

=== 2009–2011: Woe, Is Me ===
Tyler Carter joined the American electronicore band Woe, Is Me, in 2009, eventually signing to Rise Records the same year. With this seven-member line-up, the band recorded a three-song demo with producer Cameron Mizell. After releasing a studio cover of Kesha's 2009 single Tik Tok, on MySpace, the group wrote and recorded their debut studio album with Mizell. Their debut studio album, Number[s], was released on August 30, 2010, on Velocity Records, a subsidiary of Rise Records. With Carter and Bohn still members of Woe, Is Me, the group went on to release the single "Fame > Demise", the following year. Due to complications with the line-up stability and tensions within the group, Carter departed from Woe, Is Me on August 10, 2011.

=== 2012–2020: Issues ===
Following his departure from Woe, Is Me, Tyler Carter began forming a new metalcore project. After pursuing a solo career, Carter expressed interest in forming a rock band with former members of Woe, Is Me, under the name Issues. Originally, screaming vocalist Michael Bohn, keyboardist Ben Ferris, bassist Cory Ferris, guitarist AJ Rebollo, and drummer Case Snedecor joined the lineup, subsequently signing to Rise Records. The Ferris brothers departed from the group prior to the release of their debut EP, Black Diamonds, which was released on November 13, 2012, produced by Kris Crummett and recorded at Interlace Studios in Portland, Oregon . Snedecor left the band in 2013 and was replaced by drummer Josh Manuel, while Ben and Cory Ferris were replaced by keyboardist and disc jockey Tyler "Ty" Acord and bassist Skyler Acord, respectively.

The band released their debut studio album, Issues, on February 18, 2014, on Rise Records. The album was praised for its DJ-based breakdowns and fusion of metalcore and post-hardcore elements. It debuted at number 9 on the U.S. Billboard 200, selling over 22,000 copies in its first week.The same year, the band released their second EP, Diamond Dreams, on November 18.

Their second studio album, Headspace, was released on May 20, 2016, and debuted at number 20 on the U.S. Billboard 200.

Bohn announced his departure from the band in January 2018, making Tyler Carter the sole remaining vocalist in the band's line-up. The group's third studio album, Beautiful Oblivion, was released on October 4, 2019, charting at number 181 on the U.S. Billboard 200 and number 31 on the ARIA Digital Album Chart. The album also reached number 8 on Billboard's Alternative New Artist Albums chart and number 12 on the Top Rock Albums chart. In support of the album, they headlined the Beautiful Oblivion Tour in Europe and North America during the fall of 2019.

On September 1, 2020, Carter was removed from the band due to § Grooming and sexual misconduct allegations made against him.

=== Solo career ===
Tyler Carter debuted his solo career with a holiday-inspired song "I Hate the Holidays", featuring Mat Musto, on December 19, 2010. He featured on American rock band All Things Will End's song "There's No Turning Back", released on August 19, 2012. Carter also appeared on Hands Like Houses' song "Lion Skin", alongside Jonny Craig, from the album Ground Dweller (2012). The following year, he released another holiday song, "Make it Snow", featuring Tyler "Scout" Acord, on December 13.

Carter released his debut extended play, Leave Your Love, on January 13, 2015, on Velocity and Rise Records. On the album, Carter worked with producers blackbear, Ty "Scout" Acord, Boogie and Igloo. He featured on post-hardcore band Jamie's Elsewhere's 2014 single "The Illusionist".

Carter performed live with American rock band PVRIS at the 2015 Alternative Press Music Awards, performing the song "My House".

On December 23, 2015, he released a studio cover of Adele's 2015 single "Hello".

On July 8, 2016, American singer MAX released the Sokko remix of the single "Basement Party", featuring Tyler Carter. On December 20, Carter and Issues drummer Josh Manuel released a cover of "Pokémon Theme", entitled "Gotta Catch 'Em All", featuring Jacky Vincent.

Carter released the solo single, "Forget You", featuring Lophiile, on July 15, 2016. Two years later, he released the single "Pressure", on June 29, 2018. He released a second single, titled "Focus", on August 17. A third single, "Moonshine", was released on September 27, accompanied with its music video.

His debut studio album, Moonshine, was released on February 1, 2019, on Rise Records. In support of the album, he embarked on a headlining U.S. tour with musician Riley in January 2019.

In 2020, Carter collaborated with Japanese musician KSUKE to release the song "Contradiction". The song was used as the opening theme for the anime The God of High School.

Carter released Moonshine Acoustic on June 26, 2020.

In July 2020, Carter announced on Instagram that he had ended his recording contract as a solo artist with Rise Records and declared himself an independent artist, despite remaining signed with the label in Issues.

In December 2020, he announced Emerald Royce, a musical duo consisting of Carter and Chris Linck from metalcore band Attila.

In May 2025, he revealed he was fronting a new three-piece band called The Audacity. They self-released their debut EP called "Entry Wounds" on August 8, 2025.

== Personal life ==
Tyler Carter came out as bisexual in 2015.

=== Grooming and sexual misconduct allegations ===
In September 2020, Carter was accused of grooming and sexual misconduct. Carter was subsequently removed from the band Issues, which followed with a statement that they had parted ways with Carter following the allegations. In October, Miss Fortune singer Mikey Sawyer accused Carter of sexual harassment and coercion over several years. Carter released statement denying that he ever assaulted anybody but admitting to "abusing his power and 'blurring lines' with fans".

== Discography ==
=== Solo career ===
Studio albums

- Moonshine (Rise/Velocity, 2019)

Extended plays

- Leave Your Love (Rise/Velocity, 2015)
- Moonshine Acoustic (Rise, 2020)

Singles

- "Pressure" (Rise/Velocity, 2018)
- "Focus" (Rise, 2018)
- "Moonshine" (Rise, 2018)
- "Good Things" (Rise, 2018)

=== With The Audacity ===
Extended plays

- Entry Wounds (Red Slushy, 2025)

=== With Emerald Royce ===
Singles

- Use Me (Independent, 2020)
- Where Was I (Independent, 2020)

=== With Issues ===
Studio albums

- Issues (Rise, 2014)
- Headspace (Rise, 2016)
- Beautiful Oblivion (Rise, 2019)

Extended plays

- Black Diamonds (Rise, 2012)
- Diamond Dreams (Rise, 2014)

Singles

- "Hooligans" (Rise, 2013)

=== With Woe, Is Me ===
Studio albums

- Number[s] (Rise, 2010)

Singles

- "Fame > Demise" (Rise, 2011)

=== With A Path Less Traveled ===
- From Here on Out (2010)

== Collaborations ==
Year	Song	Album	Artist
2010	"I Will Destroy the Wisdom of the Wise" (feat. Tyler Carter)	Revision:Revise	A Bullet for Pretty Boy
2011	"This Was Never Yours" (feat. Tyler Carter)	Endlessly Crashing	The Last Word
2012	"Lion Skin" (feat. Tyler Carter & Jonny Craig)	Ground Dweller	Hands Like Houses
2012	"The Double Threat of Danger" (feat. Tyler Carter)	Single	Miss Fortune
2012	"Two Steps Forward, No Step Back" (feat. Tyler Carter)	Mistaken for Trophies	His Statue Falls
2012	"Inception" (feat. Tyler Carter)	It's Now or Never	Make Me Famous
2012	"Farther From Letting Go" (feat. Tyler Carter)	Single	Waves of Aether
2012	"Cars, Clothes, Calories" (feat. Tyler Carter)	Sex Mixtape	blackbear
2012	"A Dose of Reality" (feat. Tyler Carter & Michael Bohn)	The Dreamcatcher	Of Reverie
2013	"Now or Never" (feat. Tyler Carter)	Material Me	Tilian
2013	"Super Alcalina" (feat. Tyler Carter)	Morla and the Red Balloon	Time Traveller
2013	"The Drinking Song" (feat. Tyler Carter)	The Edge	Russ
2013	"Slice of Life" (feat. Tyler Carter)	Single	I Capture Castle
2013	"What I Never Learned in Study Hall" (feat. Tyler Carter)	The Predator	Ice Nine Kills
2013	"I'm Not Cut Out for This" (feat. Tyler Carter)	Genuine EP	The Crash Years
2014	"Chasing Hearts" (feat. Tyler Carter)	Savages	Breathe Carolina
2014	"High and Low" (feat. Tyler Carter)	Mind Games	Palisades
2014	"The Young and Beyond Reckless" (feat. Tyler Carter)	Through Art We Are All Equals	Slaves
2014	"The Illusionist" (feat. Tyler Carter)	Rebel-Revive	Jamie's Elsewhere
2014	"In the Mouth of Madness" (feat. Tyler Carter)	Suspiria	Nightmares
2014	"These Mountains" (feat. Tyler Carter)	Still in the Balance	Me in a Million
2014	"Armor" (feat. Tyler Carter & Sy Ari Da Kid)	Watch Me - Mixtape	Ronnie Radke
2015	"Decisions" (feat. Tyler Carter)	35xxxv (Deluxe Edition)	One Ok Rock
2015	"Transcendents" (feat. Tyler Carter)	Nomads	Vita Versus
2016	"IIII. Complicated" (feat. Tyler Carter)	WHYDFML	badXchannels
2016	"Desperate" (feat. Tyler Carter)	Boy Hero	Boy Hero
2016	"Basement Part (Sokko Remix)" (feat. Tyler Carter)	Single	MAX
2016	"Dream Eater" (feat. Tyler Carter)	Dream Eater	Separations
2016	"Cold Water (Originally by Major Lazer" (feat. Tyler Carter)	Single	Against the Current
2018	"40% Disco" (feat. Tyler Carter & Michael Bohn)	Dermaga	Sekumpulan Orang Gila
2019	"Action" (feat. Taka Moriuchi, Tyler Carter, Caleb Shomo, Tilian)|	Single	Don Broco
2019	"High School" (feat. Tyler Carter)	Single	Andrés
2019	"Sucker (Jonas Brother's Cover)" (feat. Luke Holland, Tyler Carter & Teddy Swims)	Single	Jared Dines
2020	"Blow (Ed Sheeran Cover)" (feat. Danny Worsnop, Tyler Carter & Josh Manuel)	Single	Teddy Swims
2020	"Contradiction (feat. Tyler Carter)	Single	KSUKE
