= Cane Hill (EP) =

EP by Cane Hill
- Released: October 23, 2015
- Recorded: 2014–2015
- Genre: Nu metalcore
- Length: 24:44
- Label: Rise
- Producer: Drew Fulk

Cane Hill chronology
Cane Hill (2015)	Smile (2016)

Cane Hill EP chronology
Cane Hill (2015)	Kill the Sun (2019)

Singles from Cane Hill
- 1. "Sunday School" Released: October 3, 2014; 2. "Time Bomb" Released: August 11, 2015; 3. "OxBlood" Released: September 17, 2015

Professional ratings
Review scores
Source	Rating
The Soundboard Reviews	8/10 stars
New-Transcendence	7/10 stars
Dead Press	6/10
Already Heard	3.5/5 stars

Cane Hill is the debut EP by American heavy metal band Cane Hill, released on October 23, 2015, through Rise Records.

== Track listing ==
No.	Title	Length
1.	"OxBlood"	2:49
2.	"Time Bomb" (featuring Tyler Acord)	3:27
3.	"Screwtape"	3:46
4.	"Gemini"	3:21
5.	"French 75"	4:33
6.	"The Fat of the Land"	3:23
7.	"Sunday School"	3:20
Total length:		24:44

== Personnel ==
Cane Hill

- Elijah Witt – lead vocals
- James Barnett – guitars
- Bemo Barnett – guitars
- Ryan Henriquez – bass
- Devin Clark – drums, percussion

Guest musicians

- Tyler Acord – turntables

Production

- Drew Fulk – production, recording, mixing, mastering

== Charts ==
Chart (2015)	Peak position
US Heatseekers Albums (Billboard)	21
