= Cane Hill (band) =

American heavy metal band

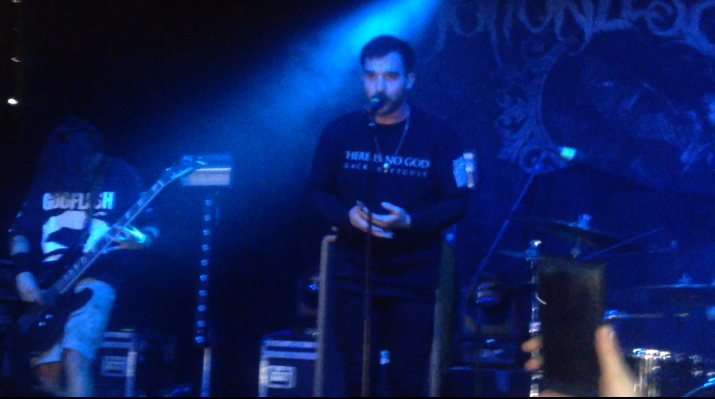
- Cane Hill performing in 2018; from left to right: Ryan Henriquez, Elijah Witt, Devin Clark.

Background information
- Origin: New Orleans, Louisiana, U.S.
- Genres: Nu metal; industrial metal; alternative metal; metalcore; nu metalcore
- Years active: 2011–present
- Labels: Rise; Out of Line
- Members: Elijah Witt; James Barnett; Ryan Henriquez; Devin Clark
- Past members: Bemo Barnett; Colt Dimaio
- Website: wearecanehill.com

Cane Hill is an American heavy metal band formed in New Orleans, Louisiana, in 2011. The band consists of vocalist Elijah Witt, guitarist James Barnett, bassist Ryan Henriquez, and drummer Devin Clark.

In 2015, the band signed to Rise Records, releasing their debut self-titled EP, Cane Hill. In 2016, the band released their debut full-length studio album, Smile. On January 19, 2018, their sophomore album Too Far Gone, was released, again via Rise Records. Too Far Gone was critically acclaimed, featuring the singles "Too Far Gone, "It Follows", "Lord of Flies" and "10¢". In late 2019, the band left Rise Records and became independent.

As of 2024, the band has released three studio albums: Smile (2016), Too Far Gone (2018) and A Piece of Me I Never Let You Find (2024) and four EPs: Cane Hill (2014), Kill the Sun (2019), Krewe de la Mort, Vol. 1 (2021) and Krewe D'Amour, Vol. 2 (2022).

== History ==
=== Formation (2011–2015) ===
After participating in different metal bands throughout the New Orleans heavy music scene, members Elijah Witt, James Barnett, Bemo Barnett, Ryan Henriquez, and Colt Dimaio emerged under the name of Cane Hill in 2014 after many line-up changes since the Barnett brothers initially formed the band in 2011. The group named themselves Cane Hill after an abandoned psychiatric hospital of that name in the United Kingdom. The band released their debut single, "Sunday School", accompanied with its music video on October 8, 2014. On the same day, the group announced that they had signed a recording contract with record label Rise Records. The band premiered their music video for the single "Time Bomb", featuring Issues former member Tyler "Scout" Acord. The single "OxBlood" was released as a single on September 17, 2015, along with its music video.

Cane Hill toured as a supporting act on Stick To Your Guns and Blessthefall's headlining U.S. tour, alongside Emarosa and Oceans Ate Alaska, from October 20 to November 22, 2015. The band released their debut self-titled EP, Cane Hill, on October 23, 2015, through Rise Records.

=== Smile (2016–2017) ===
Cane Hill entered the studio with producer WZRD BLD in Los Angeles in January 2016 to begin production for Smile. Recording took place over four weeks.

The band toured as support on Bullet For My Valentine and Asking Alexandria's headlining Attention Army of Noise U.S. tour from April 30 to May 29, 2016. They also toured as support on Atreyu's headlining U.S. tour, alongside Light the Torch and From Ashes to New, from March 4 to 28, 2016.

On April 22, 2016, the band released their single "The (New) Jesus" and announced their debut studio album Smile, which was released on July 15, 2016, through Rise Records. The music video for the single was released on the same day and sparked controversy among music critics and fans. They released the single "True Love", accompanied with its music video, on May 29, 2016. "You're So Wonderful", the band's third single off of their album Smile, was released with its music video on June 23, 2016.

Cane Hill later went on to tour on the 2016 Vans Warped Tour performing on the Full Sail University Stage from June 24 to August 13, 2016. They supported Insane Clown Posse on the Riddle Box Tour in the United States from September 22 to October 15, 2016. Cane Hill then went to Europe for the first time in the Fall of 2016 with Bullet for my Valentine and Killswitch Engage.

Cane Hill then supported Superjoint and Devildriver throughout the fall of 2017. King Parrot and Child Bite also joined up on the tour as support.

=== Too Far Gone and Kill The Sun EP (2018–present) ===
Cane Hill released their second full-length album Too Far Gone on January 19, 2018, through Rise Records.

The band supported Motionless in White's Graveyard Shift Tour in the UK and Europe with Ice Nine Kills from January 18-28th. Cane Hill also supported Of Mice & Men's Defy Tour with Blessthefall, Fire From the Gods, and MSCW from February 1 to March 8 and performed at A Day to Remember's Self Help Festival on March 3.

Cane Hill's singles, "It Follows" and "Lord of the Flies", were the theme songs for the NXT TakeOver: New Orleans that took place on April 7, 2018, at the Smoothie King Center in New Orleans, Louisiana. The band performed "It Follows" to start off the event and also performed NXT Woman's Champion Ember Moon's theme song with Lzzy Hale.

On July 25, 2018, Cane Hill announced their first headlining tour in North America which spans from September 21 through November 3 with support from Sharptooth and Afterlife.

On November 16, 2018, Cane Hill announced that they will release their semi-acoustic EP Kill the Sun on January 18, 2019. The title track and lead single "Kill the Sun", was released the day the band announced the EP. Music videos for the songs "86d - No Escort" and "Acid Rain" were released from the EP.

In late 2020, the band released "Power of the High" and "Kill Me", two of three tracks on the upcoming Vol. 1 Krewe de la Mort EP. The band released a series of EP's throughout 2021, confirmed by guitarist James Barnett during a Twitch interview in early 2021. Both singles were well received by metal fans and journalists.

In February 2021, the band released the single "God Is The Enemy" during a YouTube livestream. All three singles were recorded at Konkrete Studios in Kenner, Louisiana by producer and engineer Jonathan Dolese. A few months later in April, Cane Hill released the first single from Vol. 2, "Blood and Honey" along with a music video.

In April 2024, Cane Hill released singles "Ecstacy in Grief" and "The Midnight Sun" with its own music video.

On July 24, 2024, the band released the single "Fade (Into You)", accompanied with a music video, simultaneously announcing the release of their upcoming third album, A Piece of Me I Never Let You Find, released on November 1 through Out of Line Music. On August 28th, the band released another single from the upcoming album, "Permanence in Sleep".

== Musical style and influences ==
Cane Hill has been categorized as nu metal, industrial metal, metalcore alternative metal, and nu metalcore.

Lead vocalist Elijah Witt spoke about the band's influences in an interview with Rock Revolt magazine, stating Slipknot, Pantera, Megadeth, and indie hip hop as influences. Witt also cited Alice in Chains as an influence, as well as their 1994 EP Jar of Flies as a big influence on Cane Hill's 2019 EP Kill the Sun.

== Band members ==
Current

- Elijah Witt – lead vocals (2011–present)
- Elijah James Barnett – lead guitar, backing vocals (2011–present)
- Ryan Henriquez – bass, backing vocals (2012–present)
- Devin Clark – drums (2014–present)

Former

- Bemo Barnett – rhythm guitar (2011–2015)
- Colt Dimaio – drums (2013–2014)

Touring

- Mattie Hood – rhythm guitar (2016)

Timeline

== Discography ==
=== Studio albums ===
- Smile (Rise, 2016)
- Too Far Gone (Rise, 2018)
- A Piece of Me I Never Let You Find (Out of Line, 2024)

=== EPs ===
- Cane Hill (Rise, 2015)
- Kill the Sun (Rise, 2019)
- Krewe De la Mort, Volume 1 (EP) (Independent, 2021)
- Krewe D'Amour, Volume 2 (EP) (Independent, 2022)

=== Singles ===
- "All We Know" (Single) (Independent, 2021)
- "A Form of Protest" (Single) (Out of Line Music, 2022)
