= Cantrell =

Cantrell is a surname of English and French origin. Notable people with the surname include:

- Cantrell (rapper), American hip-hop artist
- Ava Cantrell (born 2001), American actress
- Arthur Cantrell (1883–1954), English cricketer and Royal Marines officer
- Betty Cantrell (disambiguation), several people
- Blu Cantrell (born 1976), R&B singer
- Cady Cantrell, model
- Cantrell (Middlesex cricketer)
- Charles P. Cantrell (1874–1948), American Medal of Honor recipient
- Dylan Cantrell (born 1994), American football player
- Frédérique Cantrel (fl. 1969–present), French actress
- Gary Cantrell, aka Lazarus Lake, American endurance race designer and director
- Hunter Cantrell (born 1995), American politician
- Jerry Cantrell (born 1966), guitarist from the band Alice in Chains
- Julie Cantrell (born 1973), American author and editor
- Lana Cantrell (born 1943), Australian-American singer, lawyer, Order of Australia awardee
- LaToya Cantrell (born 1972), American politician currently serving as the Mayor of New Orleans
- Laura Cantrell (born 1967), American singer and DJ
- Northwind (Norda Cantrell), DC Comics character
- Paul Cantrell (1895–1962), American businessman and politician
- Peter Cantrell (born 1962), Dutch cricketer
- Will Cantrell, character in the film Dark Command

== See also ==
- Cantril (disambiguation)
