= A Piece of Me I Never Let You Find =

Studio album by Cane Hill
- Released: November 1, 2024
- Recorded: 2024
- Genre: Metalcore; nu metal; industrial metal; alternative metal; alternative rock
- Length: 35:50
- Label: Out of Line

Cane Hill studio album chronology
Too Far Gone (2018)	A Piece of Me I Never Let You Find (2024)

Singles from A Piece of Me I Never Let You Find
- 1. "The Midnight Sun" Released: April 11, 2024; 2. "Ecstasy in Grief" Released: April 11, 2024; 3. "Fade" Released: July 24, 2024; 4. "Permanence in Sleep" Released: August 27, 2024; 5. "Drowning Therapy" Released: October 9, 2024; 6. "Finding Euphoria" Released: November 1, 2024

Professional ratings
Review scores
Source	Rating
Boolin Tunes	9/10
Lambgoat	5/10

A Piece of Me I Never Let You Find is the third studio album by American metal band Cane Hill, released on November 1, 2024, through Out of Line Music, a week after its originally scheduled release date of October 25. Six singles were released in advance of the album.

In August and September 2024, the band promoted the album in advance by supporting the Signs of the Swarm 10th anniversary tour along with Ov Sulfur, 156/Silence, and A Wake in Providence.

== Track listing ==
A Piece of Me I Never Let You Find track listing
No.	Title	Length
1.	"The Pain Ends When You Let Go."	1:00
2.	"The Midnight Sun"	3:33
3.	"Ecstasy in Grief"	2:52
4.	"I Always Knew We Were Doomed"	3:28
5.	"Fade"	2:52
6.	"Drowning Therapy"	3:31
7.	"The Sound of Roses in Bloom."	1:23
8.	"Eye to Eye (Iris)"	2:25
9.	"How Could You Lose?"	4:07
10.	"Permanence in Sleep"	3:36
11.	"Finding Euphoria"	3:36
12.	"Fade (Into You)"	3:27
Total length:		35:50

== Personnel ==
Cane Hill

- Elijah Witt – lead vocals
- James Barnett – guitars
- Ryan Henriquez – bass
- Devin Clark – drums, percussion
- Jonathan Dolese – production, mixing, mastering
- Landon Tewers - production, mixing, mastering
