= Smile (Cane Hill album) =

Studio album by Cane Hill
- Released: July 15, 2016
- Genres: Nu metal; nu metalcore
- Length: 34:25
- Label: Rise
- Producer: Drew Fulk

Cane Hill chronology
| Cane Hill (2015) | Smile (2016) | Too Far Gone (2018) |

Cane Hill studio album chronology
| Smile (2016) | Too Far Gone (2018) |

Singles from Smile
- 1. "(The New) Jesus" Released: April 22, 2016; 2. "True Love" Released: May 29, 2016; 3. "You're So Wonderful" Released: June 23, 2016; 4. "MGGDA" Released: July 4, 2016

Professional ratings
Review scores
| Source | Rating |
|---|---|
| New Noise | 4.5/5 stars |
| Loud Mag | 7/10 stars |
| Louder Sound | 2.5/5 stars |
| The Soundboard Reviews | 8/10 stars |
| Dead Press | 8/10 |
| Already Heard | 4/5 stars |
| Heavy Mag | 4/5 stars |
| KillYourStereo.com | 5.5/10 stars |
| The Edge | 4/5 stars |

Smile is the debut studio album by American heavy metal band Cane Hill, released on July 15, 2016, through Rise Records.

== Track listing ==
| No. | Title | Length |
|---|---|---|
| 1. | "MGGDA" | 2:49 |
| 2. | "(The New) Jesus" | 3:17 |
| 3. | "True Love" | 3:47 |
| 4. | "St. Veronica" ( (Note: Incorrectly referred to as "Lost Angel Dust" in album booklet)) | 3:32 |
| 5. | "Fountain of Youth" | 3:24 |
| 6. | "Cream Pie" | 2:24 |
| 7. | "You're So Wonderful" | 3:20 |
| 8. | "Ugly Model Mannequin" ( (Note: Also referred to as "Ugly Idol Mannequin" by lyrics and album booklet)) | 2:53 |
| 9. | "Screwtape" (Re-recorded from Cane Hill) | 3:47 |
| 10. | "Strange Candy" | 5:06 |
| Total length: | | 34:25 |

== Personnel ==
Cane Hill

- Elijah Witt – lead vocals
- James Barnett – guitars
- Ryan Henriquez – bass
- Devin Clark – drums, percussion

Production

- Drew Fulk – production, recording, mixing, mastering
- Jeff Dunne – engineering, mixing, mastering

== Charts ==
| Chart (2016) | Peak position |
|---|---|
| US Heatseekers Albums (Billboard) | 1 |
| US Independent Albums (Billboard) | 10 |
| US Top Hard Rock Albums (Billboard) | 3 |
| US Top Rock Albums (Billboard) | 15 |
