= Beautiful Oblivion =

Studio album by Issues
- Released: October 4, 2019
- Recorded: 2017–2019
- Studio: Home recording studio Calabasas, California
- Genre: Nu metal; pop metal; R&B; funk; metalcore
- Length: 46:21
- Label: Rise
- Producer: Howard Benson

Issues chronology
Headspace (2016)	Beautiful Oblivion (2019)

Singles from Beautiful Oblivion
- 1. "Tapping Out" Released: May 3, 2019; 2. "Drink About It" Released: August 12, 2019; 3. "Flexin'" Released: September 27, 2019

Beautiful Oblivion is the third and final studio album by American metalcore band Issues, released on October 4, 2019, on Rise Records. It serves as a follow-up to their second studio album, Headspace (2016) and was produced by Howard Benson. The album showcases the group's progression of experimenting with other musical styles and influences, using elements of nu metal, progressive metal and djent, and influences of neo-soul, R&B, funk, electronica and pop. Less than a year following the album's release, lead singer Tyler Carter was fired in relation to allegations of sexual misconduct; the band later announced in late 2023 that they would be breaking up following three farewell shows in 2024.

The album was supported by three singles: "Tapping Out", "Drink About It" and "Flexin'". To promote the album, the band toured as support on American rock band I Prevail's Trauma North American tour and embarked on a headlining 2019 world tour in the US and UK.

After Headspace (2016), Issues began writing sessions for their third studio album. On January 4, 2018, it was revealed that the group had parted ways with original member and unclean vocalist Michael Bohn, thus making the band a four-piece moving forward. Guitarist AJ Rebollo and bass guitarist Skyler Acord subsequently took over screaming vocal duties for future tours, with Rebollo recording unclean vocals on studio performances. In between tours and recording sessions, lead singer Tyler Carter released his debut solo studio album, Moonshine, in February 2019, and embarked on a solo headlining tour.

== Promotion ==
On May 3, 2019, the band released the album's lead single, "Tapping Out". The music video for the song premiered June 26, 2019. The album's announcement was on August 11, 2019, and the second single, "Drink About It", was released accompanied with its music video the following day. A third single, "Flexin'", a 2 minute and 26 second disco-inspired pop and funk metal song, was released on September 27, along with its music video.

The band toured as support on American rock band I Prevail's Trauma North American tour, from April 24 to August 9, 2019. The Beautiful Oblivion Tour took place in the United Kingdom from October 7 to 17, with support from Lotus Eater, and continued in North America from November 7 to December 15, 2019, with support from Polyphia, Sleep Token, and Lil Aaron.

On November 20, 2020, Issues released the instrumental version of the album on all streaming media and digital download platforms.

== Composition ==
Beautiful Oblivion is a nu metal album with elements of progressive metal and djent, and influences of neo-soul, R&B, funk, electronica and pop. The album is the band's first release to not feature original member and unclean vocalist Michael Bohn, which led to significantly less screaming vocals being featured on the record, with the exception of guitarist AJ Rebollo's unclean vocals on a few tracks. Writing sessions for songs on the album began as early as 2014, when the band began reviving old demo recordings, while recording sessions took place between 2017 and 2019, in Calabasas, California with producer Howard Benson. Kris Crummett stepped down as producer and served as an engineer on the record. Ty "Lophiile" Acord, a former member of the band, helped compose and perform synthesizers and programming for the album. The band's recording sessions were heavily disrupted due to the 2018 California wildfires, which lead to the members having to evacuate on various occasions.

=== Lyrics and music ===
The opening track, "Here's To You"–a moody R&B-laden metal song–opens with a sample of Ty "Lophiile" Acord toying with a yo-yo. The second track, "Drink About It", a groove metal and R&B song, was written by singer Tyler Carter with the lyrical subject matter dealing with "[a] cheater being found out by their unfortunate partner." "Tapping Out", a nu metalcore track, was released as the lead single and features guitarist AJ Rebollo performing unclean vocals on the bridge; Rebollo and Carter wrote the song about Rebollo's suicide attempt during recording sessions for the album. "Rain" was musically inspired by pop punk, specifically Mayday Parade, with its lyricism dealing with "people who always drag the fucking mood down."

The seventh song, "Downfall", has been labeled as one of the heavier tracks on the record, featuring double drop C# tuned guitars. "Second Best", the eighth track, features both melancholic lyrics and upbeat nu metal elements, and was co-written by Carter with Bad Seed Rising singer and guitarist Francheska Pastor. The ninth song, "Get It Right", has been described as a stand-out on the record, with elements of neo-soul, R&B and 90s-inspired pop; lyrically, the track deals with sex. "Flexin'", the tenth song, began as a joke which later was decided by the band to be a track on the record featuring satirical lyrics about rebelling and elements of funk, electro-pop and disco. It was described as a freestyle exercise for Carter after growing tired of writing. "No Problem (Keep It Alive)", the eleventh song, was the first track written for the album, and features interpolated lyrics and vocal parts from "If You Love Me" by Brownstone and "Red Nose" by Sage the Gemini. The twelfth track, "Your Sake", is a piano ballad featuring no other instrumentation, becoming the first song by Issues to only feature piano and vocals. The thirteenth and final track, the title-track, features more electronica production with elements of nu metal and jazz.

== Track listing ==
All tracks are written by Skyler Acord, Tyler Carter, Joshua Manuel and Adrian Rebollo, with additional co-writers listed.

No.	Title	Co-writer	Length
1.	"Here's to You"	Jesse Boykins III, Michael Montoya	4:40
2.	"Drink About It"	Tyler Acord, Jimmy Burney, Jazelle Rodriguez	3:29
3.	"Find Forever"		3:39
4.	"Tapping Out"	Erik Ron	3:38
5.	"Without You"	T. Acord, Nico Hartikainen, Patrick Hunt Bradley	3:02
6.	"Rain"	T. Acord, Jessica Schneidau, David Newton	2:50
7.	"Downfall"	Tyler Smyth, Rou Reynolds	3:53
8.	"Second Best"	Kenneth Mount, Francheska Dominique, Zack Odom	3:56
9.	"Get It Right"	T. Acord, Alex Mescudi, Jacob Lutrell	2:59
10.	"Flexin'"	Seann Bowe, Lenny Skolnik	2:26
11.	"No Problem (Keep It Alive)"	Ivana Nwokike, Lynette Gilbert, Dave Hall, Gordon Chambers	4:01
12.	"Your Sake"	Bryce Cain	4:12
13.	"Beautiful Oblivion"	T. Acord, Burney	3:36
Total length:			46:21

== Personnel ==
Issues

- Tyler Carter – clean vocals, additional unclean vocals
- Adrian Rebollo – guitars, unclean vocals on "Tapping Out"
- Skyler Acord – bass, additional vocals on “Here’s to You”
- Joshua Manuel – drums, percussion

Additional personnel

- Tyler Acord "Lophiile" – programming, composer, additional instrumentation, synthesizers

Production

- Digital editor – Paul DeCarli, Joe Rickard
- Engineer – Howard Benson, Michael Closson, Kris Crummett, Trevor Dietrich, Hatsukazu Inagaki, Ricky Orozco, Mike Plotnikoff
- Guitar technician – Marc VanGool
- Producer – Howard Benson
- Mixing – Kris Crummett
- Mastering – Kris Crummett

== Charts ==
Chart (2019)	Peak position
Australian Digital Albums (ARIA)	31
US Billboard 200	181
