= Miss HIV =

- Directed by: Jim Hanon
- Written by: Jim Hanon
- Produced by: Mart Green
- Music by: Jason Moore; Kirk Whalum
- Distributed by: EthnoGraphic Media (U.S. and worldwide with exceptions)
- Release dates: 2007 (festivals); August 26, 2008
- Running time: 88 minutes
- Country: United States
- Language: English
- Budget: $750,000

Miss HIV is a feature-length documentary by Ethnographic Media, released to DVD on August 26, 2008. Written and directed by Jim Hanon (Beyond the Gates of Splendor, End of the Spear), and produced by Mart Green, the film explores the international collision of HIV/AIDS policies while following the journey of two HIV-positive women who enter a pageant in Botswana. What is happening in Botswana, where half of all pregnant women are HIV positive, is set contrasted with the past successes of Uganda, which has experienced one of the largest reductions in HIV infections ever recorded.

== Inspiration ==
According to Hanon, HIV/AIDS is an almost unimaginable tragedy that everyone acknowledges at some level; but Hanon believes it is largely compartmentalized by those Westerners who have no direct experience with the disease. Hanon wanted to find out why, unlike previous pandemics, people are still dying of a preventable disease. He traveled to the International AIDS Conference in Toronto and found that answering that question meant addressing the issue of controlling sexual behaviors and moral judgement, which is already a point of conflict between many church and homosexual communities. Controlling sex also raises issues of women's rights in parts of the world where women are not able to refuse their partners.

Producer Mart Green had read a book by Dr. Edward C. Green, which shared the success of the Uganda ABC program (Abstinence, be faithful, use a condom) and how this program is under attack from AIDS activists. Questions emerged about sex, human rights, and ideology. Hanon felt that the Miss HIV pageant in Botswana was a place to explore these questions.

== Individuals featured ==
- Elizabeth Romolale - HIV Positive contestant
- Gaelebale Thabang - HIV Positive contestant
- Bill Gates
- Melinda Gates
- Bill Clinton
- Dr. Edward C. Green
- Dr. Norman Hearst
- Martin Ssempa

== Filming ==
Miss HIV was filmed on location across sub-Saharan Africa and at the International AIDS Conference in Toronto with Bill and Melinda Gates and former President Bill Clinton. Music group, The Newsboys joined Ethnographic Media in Africa during production not only as musicians, but also as members of the film making crew. Their music video for the song "Something Beautiful" was filmed in Uganda by the Ethnographic film team as well.

== Soundtrack ==
Contributing to the soundtrack of the film were international jazz artist Kirk Whalum, Anthony Crawford and Gospel rappers Caleb The Bridge and Mr.Del.

== Behind-the-scenes ==
The Ethnographic Film team has released several behind-the-scenes videos that chronicle the journey of the film team as well as the music artists that joined the production. EGM also filmed three music videos related to the project for the songs: "Something Beautiful" by The Newsboys, "Rain Cry" and "U Can Do It 2" by Mr. Del.

== Film festivals ==
- Redemptive Film Festival 2007 - Winner Redemptive Storyteller Award
- Heartland Film Festival 2007
- Africa World Festival of Documentary Films 2007
- Artivist Film Festival 2007
- San Francisco Black Film Festival

== Recent activity ==
EGM recently announced that a portion of proceeds from the sale of the DVD will help provide DVDs free of charge to the Office of the First Lady and any African media outlets to use in AIDS prevention education efforts.
