= Hope Handwritten =

Studio album by Hope Tala
- Released: 28 February 2025
- Genre: R&B, bossa nova, pop, neo soul
- Length: 53:24
- Label: PMR
- Producer: Baca & Brandn; Jonah Christian; Anoop D'Souza; Anton Göransson; Grades; Tommy King; Greg Kurstin; Nolan Lambroza; Lophiile; Hope Natasha McDonald; Jacob Olofsson; Ari PenSmith; Social House; Stint; TSB; Youngteam

Singles from Hope Handwritten
- 1. "I Can't Even Cry" Released: 5 April 2024; 2. "Bad Love God" Released: 28 June 2024; 3. "Thank Goodness" Released: 16 August 2024; 4. "Shiver" Released: 25 September 2024; 5. "Jumping the Gun" Released: 17 October 2024; 6. "Survival" Released: 25 November 2024; 7. "Phoenix" Released: 24 January 2025; 8. "Magic or Medicine" Released: 25 February 2025

Hope Handwritten is the debut studio album by British singer-songwriter Hope Tala, released on 28 February 2025 through PMR.

== Release ==
On 5 April 2024, Hope Tala released the single "I Can't Even Cry". She released her second single of the year, "Bad Love God", on 28 June 2024. She released the single "Thank Goodness" on 16 August 2024. On 25 September 2024, she released "Shiver" as a single. Tala formally announced the album and its release date, alongside its fifth single, "Jumping the Gun", on 17 October 2024. The album's sixth single, "Survival", was released on 25 November 2024. She released "Phoenix" as a single on 24 January 2025. The album's final single, "Magic or Medicine" was released on 25 February 2025.

== Critical reception ==
Professional ratings
Aggregate scores
Source	Rating
Metacritic	72/100
Review scores
Source	Rating
Clash	8/10
DIY	3.5/5 stars
Dork	5/5
The Guardian	3/5 stars
NME	4/5 stars

According to the review aggregator Metacritic, Hope Handwritten received "generally favorable reviews" based on a weighted average score of 72 out of 100 from 4 critic scores.

Luke Winstanley of Clash praised the album as a "fascinating blend of joyous R&B hooks [...], sparkling dream pop guitars [...] and luxurious balladry." Hollie Geraghty's review for NME concludes that album is "for going through the growing pains of your twenties and accepting the unknown of it all, but never refusing to feel it." Katie Hawthorne of The Guardian wrote that "Tala ruminates on heartbreak, self-confidence, faith, family and friendship" on the album "over a honeyed mix of bossa nova, R&B and pop, and in her gorgeous, breathy voice". Writing for DIY, Ife Lawrence praised the album's lyrics, describing it "full of heart and introspective, candid lyricism."

== Track listing ==
Hope Handwritten track listing
No.	Title	Writer(s)	Producer(s)	Length
1.	"Growing Pains (Prologue)"	Hope Natasha McDonald	Baca & Brandn	3:29
2.	"Jumping the Gun"	H. McDonald; Caroline Ailin; Maureen McDonald; Isabella Sjöstrand	H. McDonald; Anton Göransson; Social House	3:11
3.	"Lights Camera Action"	McDonald; Jonah Christian; Tommy King	Christian; King	3:23
4.	"Magic or Medicine"	McDonald; Christian; Daniel Traynor	Christian; Grades	3:03
5.	"Breaking Isn't What a Heart Is For"	H. McDonald; Ailin; M. McDonald; Sjöstrand	Greg Kurstin	2:52
6.	"I Can't Even Cry"	H. McDonald; Anoop D'Souza	D'Souza	3:41
7.	"Thank Goodness"	H. McDonald; Ailin; M. McDonald; Sjöstrand	Stint	3:20
8.	"Survival"	H. McDonald	Ari PenSmith; Jacob Olofsson	3:33
9.	"Phoenix"	H. McDonald	Baca & Brandn; Nolan Lambroza	2:39
10.	"Fall Too Hard"	H. McDonald; Ailin; M. McDonald; Sjöstrand	Kurstin	3:32
11.	"Lose My Mind"	H. McDonald; D'Souza	D'Souza; Rob Arágon	3:19
12.	"Bad Love God"	H. McDonald	Social House; TSB	3:23
13.	"A Story to Tell/Where I Begin"	H. McDonald; D'Souza	H. McDonald; D'Souza	4:37
14.	"Miracle"	H. McDonald	Lophiile; Youngteam	2:54
15.	"Shiver"	H. McDonald; D'Souza; Olofsson	D'Souza; PenSmith; Olofsson	3:25
16.	"Heartbeat (The End)"	H. McDonald; D'Souza; Shaan Ramaprasad	D'Souza	2:54
Total length:				53:24

== Personnel ==
Credits adapted from Tidal.

=== Musicians ===
- Hope Tala – vocals (all tracks), guitar (track 13)
- Brandon Garcia – guitar, piano (1, 9); arrangement, drum programming, synthesizer (1)
- David Baca – drum programming, vocals (1); bass, guitar (9)
- Isaac Mallach – cello (1, 9)
- Sarah Hennessy – violin (1)
- Jonah Christian – drum programming, guitar (3, 4); bass, drums (3); keyboards, synthesizer (4)
- Tommy King – keyboards, organ, piano (3)
- Grades – drum programming, keyboards (4)
- Greg Kurstin – bass, guitar, Rhodes (5, 10); strings, Wurlitzer (5); drums, percussion, synthesizer (10)
- Jacob Olofsson – bass, drum programming, drums, synthesizer (8)
- Ari PenSmith – synthesizer, vocals (8)
- Nolan Lambroza – Mellotron, Wurlitzer (9)
- Anoop D'Souza – bass, guitar, piano (11, 13, 16); arrangement, drum programming, Rhodes (11); drums (13, 16); barrel organ, percussion, vocals (13); organ (16)
- Rob Arágon – guitar (11)
- Laine Johnston – violin (11)
- Ali Ramsey – vocals (13)
- Anaïs Cardot – vocals (13)
- Lophiile – drum programming, drums, keyboards, synthesizer (14)
- Youngteam – drum programming, guitar, synthesizer (14)
- Shaan Ramaprasad – viola, violin (16)
- Sie Romero – vocals (16)

=== Technical ===
- Jaycen Joshua – mixing, mastering
- Mike Seaberg – mixing, engineering
- Greg Kurstin – mixing (10); engineering, recording (5, 10)
- Emily Lazar – mastering (10)
- Jonah Christian – engineering (3), recording (3, 4)
- Jacob Olofsson – engineering (8)
- David Baca – engineering, editing (9); recording (1)
- Nolan Lambroza – engineering (9)
- Anoop D'Souza – engineering, recording (11, 13)
- Tyler Acord – engineering (14, 16), recording (16)
- Julian Burg – recording (5, 10)
- Matt Tuggle – recording (5, 10)
- Brandon Garcia – recording (1)
- Chris Bhikoo – engineering assistance
- Jacob Richards – engineering assistance
