= Too Far Gone (Cane Hill album) =

Studio album by Cane Hill
- Released: January 19, 2018
- Recorded: 2017
- Genre: Nu metal; grunge; groove metal; metalcore
- Length: 35:58
- Label: Rise
- Producer: Drew Fulk

Cane Hill chronology
Smile (2016)	Too Far Gone (2018)	Kill the Sun (2019)

Cane Hill studio album chronology
Smile (2016)	Too Far Gone (2018)	A Piece of Me I Never Let You Find (2024)

Singles from Too Far Gone
- 1. "Too Far Gone" Released: October 9, 2017; 2. "Lord of Flies" Released: December 5, 2017; 3. "10¢" Released: December 17, 2017; 4. "It Follows" Released: January 6, 2018

Too Far Gone is the second studio album by American heavy metal band Cane Hill, released on January 19, 2018, through Rise Records. It is their most successful album to date, topping Billboard's Heatseekers Chart and charting at #8 on Billboard's Independent Albums Chart.

== Reception ==
Professional ratings
Review scores
Source	Rating
Cryptic Rock	5/5 stars
Ghost Cult Magazine	8/10 stars
Kill Your Stereo	75/100
The Soundboard Reviews	8/10 stars
New Noise Magazine	4/5 stars
Louder Sound	3.5/5 stars
Already Heard	3.5/5 stars
Depth Mag	8/10 stars
Dead Press	7/10

In April 2018, Loudwire named Too Far Gone as one of the best metal albums of 2018 (so far), commenting: "Combining nu metal and metalcore for a slick and modern sound with plenty of Korn worship, there’s been a huge amount of buzz surrounding Cane Hill thanks to songs like “Lord of Flies,” “It Follows” and the album’s title track.”

== Track listing ==
No.	Title	Length
1.	"Too Far Gone"	3:44
2.	"Lord of Flies"	3:25
3.	"Singing in the Swamp"	4:28
4.	"Erased"	3:52
5.	"Why?"	4:09
6.	"It Follows"	3:47
7.	"Scumbag"	1:57
8.	"Hateful"	3:07
9.	"10¢"	3:04
10.	"The End."	4:20
Total length:		35:58

== Personnel ==
Cane Hill

- Elijah Witt – lead vocals
- James Barnett – guitars
- Ryan Henriquez – bass
- Devin Clark – drums, percussion

Production

- Drew Fulk – production, recording, mixing, mastering
- Jeff Dunne – engineering, mixing, mastering

== Charts ==
Chart (2018)	Peak position
US Top Album Sales (Billboard)	46
US Top Hard Rock Albums (Billboard)	16
US Heatseekers Albums (Billboard)	1
US Independent Albums (Billboard)	8
