= Grow (album) =

Studio album by Chon
- Released: March 24, 2015
- Genre: Progressive rock
- Length: 34:05
- Label: Sumerian
- Producer: Eric Palmquist, Shaun Lopez, Eric Broyhill

Chon chronology
Woohoo! (2014)	Grow (2015)	Homey (2017)

Grow is the debut studio album by American progressive rock band Chon. It was released on March 23, 2015, through Sumerian Records. It was the band's last release to feature bassist Drew Pelisek. The album features several new compositions, along with several that had previously appeared elsewhere. ‘Knot’, ‘Suda’ and ‘Echo’ (formerly ‘Ecco’) are all pulled from the bands second EP, Woohoo! while ‘Perfect Pillow’ is based on ‘The Perfect Pillow’ from their original 2008 self-titled EP.

== Track listing ==
Adapted from iTunes

No.	Title	Length
1.	"Drift"	0:36
2.	"Story"	3:50
3.	"Fall"	3:39
4.	"Book"	2:42
5.	"Can't Wait"	3:08
6.	"Suda"	3:02
7.	"Knot"	3:02
8.	"Moon"	1:20
9.	"Splash"	2:27
10.	"Perfect Pillow"	3:35
11.	"Echo"	2:52
12.	"But"	3:52
Total length:		34:05

== Personnel ==
Chon

- Mario Camarena – guitar, bass, keyboard, piano
- Erick Hansel – guitar, bass, piano
- Drew Pelisek – bass, vocals
- Nathan Camarena – drums, percussion, vocals

Guest Musicians

- Brian Evans – drums (Tracks: 2, 9, 10)
- Matt Garstka – drums (Tracks: 4, 12)

Production

- Eric Palmquist – tracking, recording, audio engineering
- Shaun Lopez – mixing
- Eric Broyhill – mastering
- Andrew Jarrín – management
- Amanda Fiore and Daniel McBride – A&R
- Daniel McBride – photography, artwork, layout
- Mario Camarena and Erick Hansel – additional art
- Steven Conteras – additional photography

== Chart performance ==
Chart (2015)	Peak position
Heatseekers Albums	1
Independent Albums	13
Billboard 200	122
