= Headspace (Issues album) =

Studio album by Issues
- Released: May 20, 2016
- Recorded: January 23 – August 13, 2015
- Studio: Interlace Audio in Portland, Oregon; Grey Area Studios in North Hollywood, Los Angeles
- Genre: Metalcore; R&B; pop; nu metal
- Length: 43:59
- Label: Rise
- Producer: Kris Crummett; Erik Ron; Tyler "Scout" Acord

Issues chronology
| Diamond Dreams (2014) | Headspace (2016) | Beautiful Oblivion (2019) |

Singles from Headspace
- 1. "The Realest" Released: March 24, 2016; 2. "COMA" Released: April 19, 2016; 3. "Blue Wall" Released: May 9, 2016

Headspace is the second studio album by American metalcore band Issues. Released on May 20, 2016, on Rise Records, the band recruited Kris Crummett once more to produce the album. It is their final studio album to feature original member and co-vocalist Michael Bohn before his departure in January 2018, and is their first release since the departure of keyboardist and disc jockey Tyler "Scout" Acord. Despite this, Acord performs synthesizers and production on the album, and appears in the music video for its first single "The Realest". The album showcases the group's experimental approach to their signature metalcore-contemporary R&B hybrid sound, exploring elements of nu metal, pop, hip hop and funk.

The album was supported by three singles; "The Realest", "COMA" and "Home Soon". In support of the album, the group toured with Volumes, from September to November 2017. They also performed on the Vans Warped Tour in 2016 and 2018.

== Background and recording ==
Issues began recording the album on January 23, 2015, and discussed a hopefulness in an exciting change in sound. Ty "Scout" Acord left the band, as an official member, a month before album's recording was done, however continued to record the album with the band. Recording sessions for the album concluded on August 13, 2015.

== Reception ==
Professional ratings
Review scores
| Source | Rating |
|---|---|
| Alternative Press | (positive) |
| Dead Press! | 9/10 |
| Rock Sound | 6/10 |
| Soundfiction | (positive) |

Upon its release, the album has received generally positive reviews. The record has largely been seen as an improvement over their self-titled record, most notably the guitar work has been stepped up utilizing jazz chords, more lead riffs, and choppy syncopated rhythms. Reviewers also showed their appreciation for a new mix of genres the band has tampered with including country ("Home Soon" and "Yung and Dum"), jazz ("Hero"), funk ("Hero" and "The Realest") and rap. "Blue Wall", regarded as one of the heaviest song on the album, features vocals from guitarist A.J. Rebollo. Carter rapped a significant amount of lyrics on songs "Flojo", "Blue Wall", and "Someone Who Does". The vocal dynamic between Bohn and Carter has been the center of attention, because Bohn had not taken clean vocal duties prior to Headspace. Praising the album, Michelle Beck for Revival Media said, "Headspace is a mish-mash masterpiece of genres and one huge step forward in Issues' development as a band. You can clearly hear both lyrically and musically how much the band have matured in the two years since the release of their self titled album." Jack Appleby of Alternative Press commended Carter and Bohn's vocal progression from their first album, going on to say that, "...Carter's hook might be the obvious spotlight, but Bohn's feisty verses set the foundation in a fresh way. Suddenly the band are accessible while maintaining heavy tendencies thanks to two strong personalities on the mics."

== Track listing ==
| No. | Title | Writer(s) | Length |
|---|---|---|---|
| 1. | "The Realest" | Issues; Erik Ron | 4:00 |
| 2. | "Home Soon" | Issues; E. Ron | 4:04 |
| 3. | "Lost-n-Found (On a Roll)" | Issues; E. Ron | 3:05 |
| 4. | "Yung & Dum" (featuring Jonathan Langston) | Issues; E. Ron | 3:06 |
| 5. | "Made to Last" | Issues; E. Ron; Jared Lee; Mario Marchetti | 3:12 |
| 6. | "Flojo" | Issues | 3:30 |
| 7. | "Hero" | Issues; E. Ron | 3:23 |
| 8. | "Coma" | Issues | 2:53 |
| 9. | "Rank Rider" | Issues; E. Ron; Colin Cunningham | 3:43 |
| 10. | "Blue Wall" | Issues | 2:41 |
| 11. | "Someone Who Does" | Issues; E. Ron | 4:15 |
| 12. | "I Always Knew" (Instrumental) | Issues | 2:04 |
| 13. | "Slow Me Down" | Issues; E. Ron; C. Cunningham | 4:04 |
| Total length: | | | 43:59 |

Japanese edition bonus tracks
| No. | Title | Length |
|---|---|---|
| 14. | "Yung & Dum" (Japanese version featuring Taka of One Ok Rock) | 3:09 |
| Total length: | | 47:08 |

== Personnel ==
Taken from album liner notes.

Issues

- Tyler Carter – clean vocals
- Michael Bohn – unclean vocals, additional clean vocals
- Adrian Rebollo – guitar, additional unclean vocals on "Blue Wall"
- Skyler Acord – bass guitar
- Tyler "Scout" Acord – turntables, samples, programming, keyboards, synthesizers, production, additional unclean vocals on "Flojo"
- Josh Manuel – drums, percussion

Additional personnel

- Kris Crummett – produced, mixed, mastered, and recorded @ Interlace Audio in Portland, OR
- Erik Ron – additional songwriting (tracks 1, 2, 3, 4, 5, 7, 9, 11, and 13), vocals recorded and produced @ Grey Area Studios in North Hollywood, CA
- Neil Engle – engineering
- Anthony Reeder – engineering
- Jared Lee – additional songwriting on "Made to Last"
- Mario Marchetti – additional songwriting on "Made to Last"
- Colin "Colin Brittain" Cunningham – additional songwriting on "Rank Rider" and "Slow Me Down"
- Brandy Wynn – violin on "Yung & Dum"
- Jacob Herring (45th St. Brass) – trombone on "Someone Who Does"
- Peter Daniel (45th St. Brass) – tenor sax on "Someone Who Does"
- Steve O'Brien (45th St. Brass) – trumpet on "Someone Who Does"
- Brienne Moore, Keanna "KJ Rose" Henson, Chel Hill – choir vocals on "Lost-n-Found (On a Roll)"
- Jonathan Thomas "Jon" Langston – additional vocals on "Yung & Dum"
- Miles Toland – artwork
- Alan Ashcraft (Rise Records) – layout
- Sean Heydorn (Rise Records) – album commissioner
- Mark Mercado, John Youngman (Fly South Music Group) – management
- Dave Shapiro, Tom Taaffe (United Talent Agency) – booking
- Bryan K. Christner, ESQ. – legal

== Charts ==
| Chart (2016) | Peak position |
|---|---|
| Australian Albums (ARIA) | 36 |
| UK Albums (OCC) | 73 |
| US Billboard 200 | 20 |
| US Top Alternative Albums (Billboard) | 1 |
