= Anthony Crawford (bassist) =

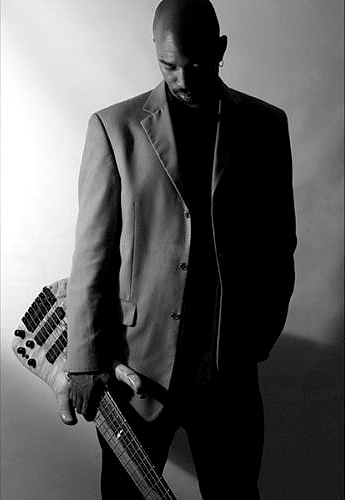

Background information
- Born: June 29, 1981 (age 43)
- Genres: Jazz, jazz fusion, hard rock, blues-rock, blues
- Occupation: Musician
- Instrument: Bass guitar
- Years active: 2000–present
- Labels: Hydro 6 Records

Anthony Crawford (born June 29, 1981) is an American bassist, songwriter, producer, and recording artist from Memphis, Tennessee.

He is best known for working with Chon, Allan Holdsworth, Justin Timberlake, Peabo Bryson, Howard Hewett, Shalamar, Kirk Whalum, Phil Perry, Glen Jones, and Karen Briggs. Crawford also played bass for the National Democratic Convention for Bill Clinton in 2000.

== Early life ==
Anthony Crawford was born in Memphis, Tennessee, into a musical family including his father, drummer Hubert "H-Bomb" Crawford, and his uncle, Hank Crawford, a well-known saxophonist. Hubert Crawford played with many notable acts, including James Brown, The Bar-Kays, The Eric Gales Band, Mark Farner of "Grand Funk Railroad", and Ann Peebles.

Anthony Crawford was considered a musical prodigy. At the age of 14, he sat in with the Bette Midler band. He later honed his talent while performing with a variety of Memphis community choirs and churches.

== Career ==
After being discovered by several notable producers, including Angelo Earl, Crawford was asked to play at the National Democratic Convention for Bill Clinton. The word began to spread and, in 2002, he appeared in a Burger King commercial with basketball icon, Shaquille O'Neal. This eventually led to him playing with well-known pop vocalist Justin Timberlake.

Crawford began serving as a bassist in the legendary R&B group Shalamar in 2004. Shortly after, he performed on tours and a DVD release with Shalamar frontman Howard Hewett.

Crawford worked with saxophonist Kirk Whalum and the pair donated their talents to create the soundtrack for a documentary film featuring Bill Gates, Melinda Gates, and Bill Clinton called Miss HIV, which was filmed in Toronto, Canada and in Sub-Saharan Africa.

Crawford relocated from Memphis to Los Angeles, and began to widely proliferate on the LA scene. In 2010, he released his debut solo album, "Urban Jazz".

In December 2010, Crawford joined Virgil Donati's group for their upcoming tour.

In 2017, Crawford served as studio bassist for CHON's Homey album.

In 2019, Crawford served for CHON's self-titled album.

== Discography ==
Anthony Crawford:

- 2017 Witherfall "Nocturnes and Requiems"
- 2010 Urban Jazz

World Overcomers Outreach Ministry:

- Kingdom Liberation LIVE

FreeSol

- 11:11

Howard Hewett

- Intimate

Delight

- Rita Marie Valle

Solstice

- Exploration=Discovery
- Hyperspace Wavelength Travel

The Tim Terry Experience

- Self-titled

Floyd Taylor

- No Doubt

CHON

- Homey
- CHON
