= Chon (band) =

American progressive rock band

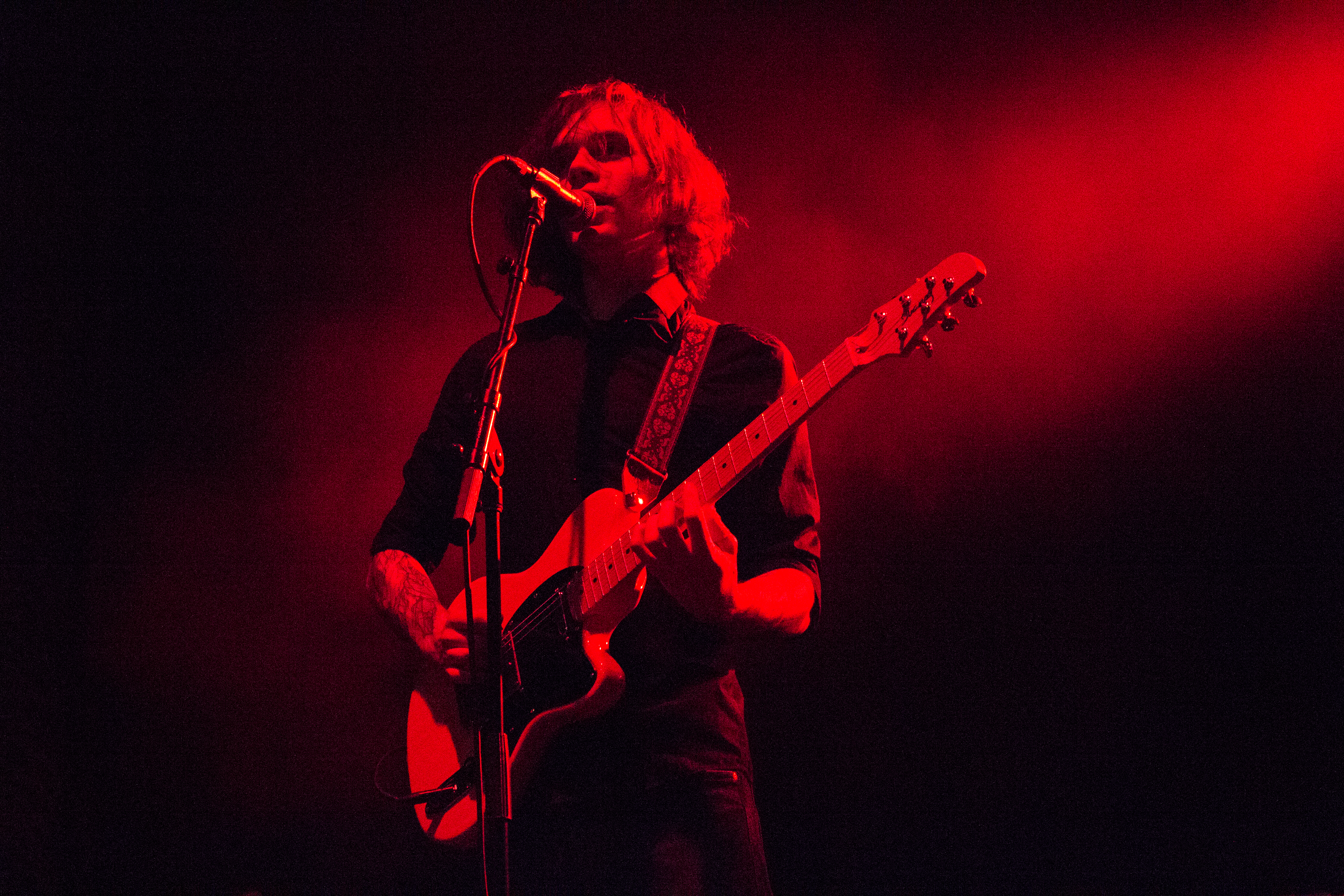
- Erick Hansel performing with Chon at The Observatory North Park

Background information
- Origin: Oceanside, California, U.S.
- Genres: Progressive rock; instrumental rock
- Years active: 2008–2024
- Label: Sumerian
- Past members: Mario Camarena; Erick Hansel; Nathan Camarena; Esiah Camarena; Drew Pelisek; Brian Evans
- Website: https://chonofficial.bandcamp.com/

Chon (sometimes stylized as CHON) was an American progressive rock band from Oceanside, California. Their music is largely instrumental with only a few songs containing vocal performances. The final line up of the band consisted of Mario Camarena (guitar), Erick Hansel (guitar), Esiah Camarena (bass) and Nathan Camarena (drums).

== History ==
=== Early career ===
In 2008, they began releasing demos via the internet. In 2010, the band began a brief hiatus, but reunited in 2011 to record two new songs, "O.G." and "Breathe". They returned in 2013 with the release of their debut EP entitled Newborn Sun. In 2014, Chon released their second EP, entitled Woohoo! and embarked on two consecutive nationwide tours with Animals as Leaders.

=== Grow and departure of Pelisek ===
In December 2014, Chon signed with the record label Sumerian Records, and announced they would be releasing their debut full-length album the following year. On February 5, 2015, the band announced their debut full length titled Grow would be released in March 2015. On March 5, the band premiered their song Can't Wait from the album via Red Bull. They released the album on March 24. Eight days prior the band embarked on a 27 date tour supporting Circa Survive. On December 16, 2015, Chon announced their first full US headlining tour, titled the Super Chon Bros Tour, with accompanying bands Polyphia and Strawberry Girls. They sold out every single show on the tour. Chon was also an opening band during the Sonic Unrest Tour, featuring headliner Periphery, and bands Sikth and Toothgrinder.

On November 8, 2015, Chon stated via their Twitter feed that they parted ways with Drew Pelisek due to 'artistic differences'. It was also confirmed by Drew on a personal account.

=== Homey, self-titled, hiatus, and disbandment ===
They recorded their second album Homey with Anthony Crawford on bass. Since Pelisek's departure, Chon has had 3 touring bassists, including original bassist Esiah Camarena, who played bass during the Journey's Unplugged tour. Esiah returned as a full-time member of the band following his attendance on the Robot With Human Hair Vs. Chonzilla tour with Dance Gavin Dance. Touring bassist Brandon Ewing later went on to form Eternity Forever with drummer Ben Rosett (Strawberry Girls) and vocalist Kurt Travis.

In April 2019, Chon performed on the Mojave Stage at Coachella. Kenny G appeared as a special guest for their set.

On June 7, 2019, Chon released their third full-length self-titled album, under Sumerian Records.

On May 16, 2022, Mario and Erick announced that the band was going on hiatus via their Discord server.

On February 6, 2024, guitarist Erick Hansel confirmed through an Instagram story that Chon had officially disbanded.

== Musical style and influences ==
In the early days the band were influenced by metal bands such as Necrophagist and post-hardcore band The Fall of Troy, but the band have also listed musicians such as Hiromi Uehara, Anthony Jackson Tigran Hamasyan, Zach Hill and Alex Argento as influences in their sound as well as jazz fusion band Return to Forever. Chon's music was noted for its use of complex harmony with heavy emphasis on extended chords, as well as the odd time signatures and polyrhythms typical of the progressive rock genre. Chon's music often features counterpoint between two guitars with one instrument panned to the left and one to the right. Stereo panned counterpoint can be heard on tracks such as 'Story', 'Suda', 'Fluffy' and 'Spike'. Their second album, Homey, saw the band incorporating elements of trip-hop and electronic music, which can be heard in tracks such as 'Nayhoo.'

== Band members ==
Final lineup

- Erick Hansel – guitars (2008–2024), vocals (2016–2024)
- Mario Camarena – guitars (2008–2024)
- Nathan Camarena – drums (2008–2024)
- Esiah Camarena – bass (2008–2010, 2016–2024)

Former members

- Drew Pelisek – bass, vocals (2012–2016)

Touring members

- Garrick Arden – trombone (2010–2014)
- Brandon Ewing – bass (2016, Super Chon Bros Tour)
- Summer Swee-Singh – keys, string conductor, vocals (2018, Holiday Tour)

Studio members

- Anthony Crawford – bass guitar (2017–2020)
- Brian Evans – drums (2015–2020)

== Discography ==
=== Studio albums ===
- Grow (2015, Sumerian Records)
- Homey (2017, Sumerian Records)
- Chon (2019, Sumerian Records)

=== EPs ===
- Newborn Sun (2013, self-released)
- Woohoo! (2014, self-released)

=== Demos ===
- Chon (2008, self-released)

=== Singles ===
- "Story" (2015, Sumerian Records)
- "Splash" (2015, Sumerian Records)
- "Sleepy Tea" (2017, Sumerian Records)
- "Waterslide" (2017, Sumerian Records)
- "Nayhoo" (featuring Masego & Lophiile) (2017, Sumerian Records)
- "Peace" (2019, Sumerian Records)
- "Petal" (2019, Sumerian Records)
- "Pitch Dark" (2019, Sumerian Records)
