= Cantrill (surname) =

Cantrill is an occupational surname, for a bellman, first recorded in Staffordshire, England.

- Arthur and Corinne Cantrill, Australian filmmakers and commentators
- Bryan Cantrill, American software developer
- Hadley Cantril (1906–1969), American researcher of public opinion
- James E. Cantrill (1839–1908), Captain in the Confederate States Army Cavalry, politician and judge
- J. Campbell Cantrill (1870–1923), U.S. Representative from Kentucky
- Andrew Cantrill, British organist and choral director
