= Quantrill =

Quantrill or Quantrell is a surname of English origin. Notable people with the surname include:

- Alf Quantrill (1897–1968), British footballer
- Cal Quantrill (born 1995), Canadian baseball pitcher
- Malcolm Quantrill (1931–2009), British architect
- Paul Quantrill (born 1968), Canadian former Major League Baseball pitcher
- Sarah Quantrill (born 1990), English football goalkeeper
- William Quantrill (1837–1865), Confederate guerrilla leader during the American Civil War
- William Quantrill (diplomat) (born 1939), British former diplomat
