= Betty Cantrell =

Betty Cantrell may refer to:

- Betty Maxwell (singer) (Betty Cantrell, born 1994), American beauty pageant contestant
- Betty Roberts (Betty Cantrell, 1923–2011), American judge
