= Kill the Sun (EP) =

EP by Cane Hill
- Released: January 18, 2019
- Recorded: 2018
- Genre: Alternative rock; americana
- Length: 22:15
- Label: Rise
- Producer: Kris Crummett

Cane Hill chronology
Too Far Gone (2018)	Kill the Sun (2019)	Krewe de la Mort, Vol. 1 (2021)

Cane Hill EP chronology
Cane Hill (2015)	Kill the Sun (2019)	Krewe de la Mort, Vol. 1 (2021)

Singles from Kill the Sun
- 1. "Kill the Sun" Released: November 16, 2018; 2. "Acid Rain" Released: December 14, 2018; 3. "86d - No Escort" Released: January 11, 2019

Professional ratings
Review scores
Source	Rating
Cryptic Rock	5/5 stars
Ghost Cult Magazine	8/10 stars
The Soundboard Reviews	8/10 stars
New Noise Magazine	4/5 stars
Already Heard	3.5/5 stars
Depth Mag	8/10 stars

Kill the Sun is the second EP by American heavy metal band Cane Hill, released on January 18, 2019, through Rise Records. The EP was announced on November 16, 2018, alongside the title track "Kill the Sun", which was released as the lead single. The second single "Acid Rain" was released on December 14, 2018. According to lead vocalist Elijah Witt, Alice in Chains' 1994 acoustic EP Jar of Flies and the grunge era of MTV Unplugged were big influences on Kill the Sun, as well as R&B and pop music.

== Track listing ==
No.	Title	Length
1.	"86d - No Escort"	3:12
2.	"Empty"	3:36
3.	"Save Me"	3:30
4.	"Kill the Sun"	3:14
5.	"Acid Rain"	4:23
6.	"Smoking Man"	4:22
Total length:		22:17

== Personnel ==
Cane Hill

- Elijah Witt – lead vocals
- James Barnett – guitars
- Ryan Henriquez – bass
- Devin Clark – drums, percussion, saxophone

Production

- Kris Crummett – production, recording, mixing, mastering
