= Hope Tala =

British singer-songwriter (born 1997)

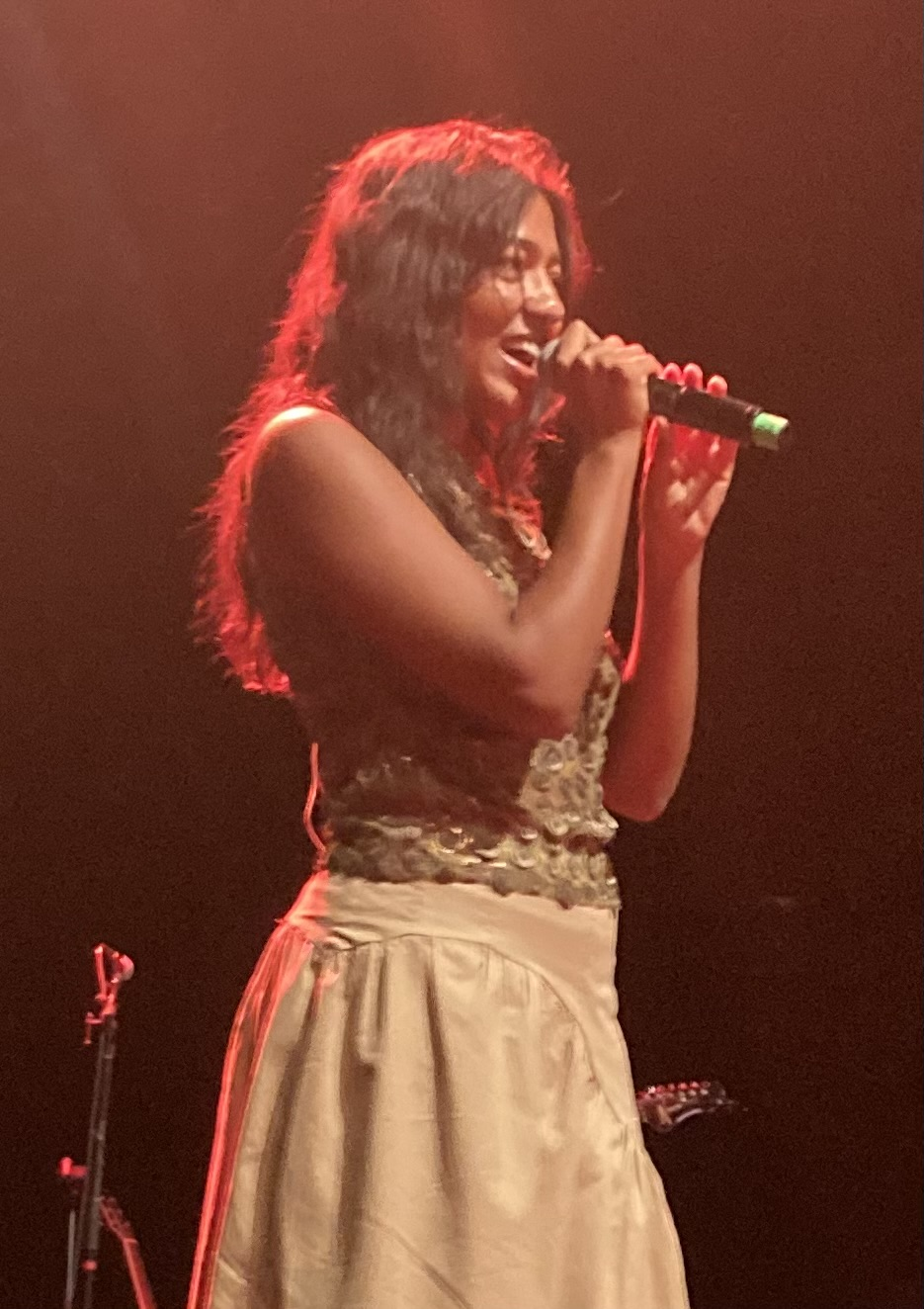
- Tala performing at the Gramercy Theatre in New York
- Born: Hope Natasha McDonald; 18 November 1997 (age 28); London, England

Academic background
- Education: University of Bristol (BA)
- Musical career
- Genres: Bossa nova, R&B, neo soul
- Occupations: Singer; songwriter
- Years active: 2018–present
- Labels: Republic Records
- Website: Official website

Hope Natasha McDonald (born 18 November 1997), known professionally as Hope Tala, is a British singer-songwriter. Her musical style has been described as pulling from R&B, Latin, neo soul, and bossa nova. Tala released her first studio album, Hope Handwritten, in February 2025.

== Early life ==
Hope Tala was born in West London to a Jamaican-descended Black father and a mother of British and Irish heritage. She learned to play various musical instruments during her childhood. Tala first started to sing at the age of 15 and wrote her first compositions during her study of AS-Level music. At home, she experimented with Logic Pro, producing demos which she published on SoundCloud. Tala describes her favourite instrument as the guitar, with a preference for nylon-string guitars but also enjoying acoustic and electric guitars. Her moniker is derived from her birth name; "Tala" is a diminutive form of her middle name, Natasha.

== Career ==
=== 2018–2019: Studies, Starry Ache, Sensitive Soul ===
Tala studied English literature at the University of Bristol. graduating with first-class honours in 2019. Tala turned down the chance to pursue a master's degree at the University of Cambridge in favor of pursuing a career in music. Tala finished her first and second EPs, Starry Ache and Sensitive Soul, while she was at university. She finished her single "Lovestained" as she was finishing her dissertation.

Tala's first single was "Blue", released in 2018 which was later included on the EP Starry Ache. She would proceed to release her singles "Lovestained" and "D.T.M." in 2019. "Lovestained" was written as Tala was working towards her degree in English literature. Tala's "Lovestained" would later be placed on Rolling Stone's "50 Best songs of 2019" list at #8. The two singles would be compiled into her EP Sensitive Soul.

=== 2020–present: Girl Eats Sun and other singles ===
Tala's "All My Girls Like To Fight" was her first song in 2020. It was around this time that Tala had declined pursuing a master's degree in favour of a career in music. Speaking to Wonderland, Tala described music as a "one-shot career" and that she would have "regretted continuing her studies" when there was the opportunity to continue on later in life. Tala described writing "All My Girls Like To Fight" as "constructing an expansive narrative in a song" and she "wanted to portray women having strength and agency in the narrative". The song would be included in her EP Girl Eats Sun.

== Critical reception ==
Tala's All My Girls Like To Fight was listed as one of Barack Obama's favourite songs of 2020. Her song "Tiptoeing" was chosen by Clara Amfo as BBC Radio One's "Hottest Record in the World" on 19 October 2021.

== Personal life ==
Tala is queer and considers herself as "black or mixed race".

== Discography ==
=== Studio albums ===
Title	Description
Hope Handwritten	Release date: 28 February 2025; Label: PMR; Formats: CD, streaming, digital download

=== Guest appearances ===
Title	Year	Album
"Floating (feat. Hope Tala)" (Raveena featuring Hope Tala)	2019	Lucid

=== Extended plays ===
List of extended-plays, with selected details, chart positions
Title	Details	Peak chart positions
Title	Details	UK DL
Starry Ache	Released: 3 October 2018; Label: Self-released; Formats: Digital download, streaming	—
Sensitive Soul	Released: 14 July 2019; Label: Self-released; Formats: Digital download, streaming	—
Girl Eats Sun	Released: 13 November 2020; Label: EMI Records; Formats: Digital download, streaming	—

=== Singles ===
Title	Year	Album
"Blue"	2018	Starry Ache
"Moontime"	2018	Starry Ache
"Lovestained"	2019	Sensitive Soul
"D.T.M."	2019	Sensitive Soul
"All My Girls Like To Fight"	2020	Girl Eats Sun
"Cherries" (featuring Aminé)	2020	Girl Eats Sun
"Crazy"	2020	Girl Eats Sun
"Mad"	2021	Non-album singles
"Tiptoeing"	2021	Non-album singles
"Party Sickness"	2022	Non-album singles
"Is It Enough"	2022	Non-album singles
"Leave It On The Dancefloor"	2022	Non-album singles
"Stayed at the Party"	2022	Non-album singles
"I Can't Even Cry"	2024	Hope Handwritten
"Bad Love God"	2024	Hope Handwritten
"Thank Goodness"	2024	Hope Handwritten
"Shiver"	2024	Hope Handwritten
"Jumping the Gun"	2024	Hope Handwritten
"Survival"	2024	Hope Handwritten
"Phoenix"	2024	Hope Handwritten
