= Black Diamonds (EP) =

EP by Issues
- Released: November 13, 2012
- Recorded: August–September 2012; Interlace Audio Studios, Portland, OR.
- Genres: Metalcore; electronicore
- Length: 22:32
- Label: Rise
- Producers: Kris Crummett; Ty "Scout" Acord

Issues chronology
Black Diamonds (2012)	Issues (2014)

Singles from Black Diamonds
- 1. "King of Amarillo" Released: October 1, 2012; 2. "Princeton Ave" Released: October 31, 2012; 3. "The Worst of Them" Released: December 17, 2012; 4. "Love, Sex, Riot" Released: March 2, 2013

Black Diamonds is the debut EP by American metalcore band Issues released on November 13, 2012.

== Background ==
The majority of the band's members originated from ex-members of Woe, Is Me, being Tyler Carter, Michael Bohn, Cory Ferris and Ben Ferris. After they left their previous band, they recorded and released this debut EP. Later in 2014, Josh Manuel replaced Case Snedecor on drums, moving on to record the full titled Issues album. The lead single, titled "King of Amarillo," was released on October 2, 2012, along with a lyric video.

== Critical reception ==
Professional ratings
Review scores
Source	Rating
AbsolutePunk	69%

AbsolutePunk stated that the sound of the album was very similar to Woe, Is Me's album Number[s], although it had a 'twist', praising Tyler Carter's vocal ability, although called the rapping in the songs 'sour'.

== Track listing ==
No.	Title	Length
1.	"Black Diamonds"	1:57
2.	"King of Amarillo"	3:29
3.	"The Worst of Them"	3:36
4.	"Princeton Ave"	3:48
5.	"Love, Sex, Riot" (featuring Chris Fronzak)	3:18
6.	"Her Monologue" (includes hidden track "Embrace Your Issues")	6:22
Total length:		22:32

Japanese bonus track
No.	Title	Length
7.	"Hooligans"

== Personnel ==
Issues

- Tyler Carter – clean vocals
- Michael Bohn – unclean vocals
- AJ Rebollo – guitars
- Case Snedecor – drums

Additional musicians

- Skyler Acord – bass
- Tyler "Scout" Acord – keyboards, synthesizers, programming, turntables
- Snow tha Product – additional vocals on "Embrace Your Issue"

Production

- Produced by Kris Crummett at Interlace Studios in Portland, Oregon
