= Issues (Issues album) =

Studio album by Issues
- Released: February 18, 2014
- Recorded: 2013
- Genres: Metalcore; pop metal; R&B
- Length: 43:44
- Label: Rise
- Producers: Kris Crummett; Ty "Scout" Acord; Matt Malpass

Issues chronology
Black Diamonds (2012)	Issues (2014)	Diamond Dreams (2014)

Singles from Issues
- 1. "Stingray Affliction" Released: December 18, 2013; 2. "Never Lose Your Flames" Released: May 1, 2014; 3. "Mad at Myself" Released: October 10, 2014

Issues (written as "•issues•" on the album's cover) is the debut studio album by American metalcore band Issues. Released on February 18, 2014, on Rise Records, the album debuted at number 9 on the Billboard 200, selling over 22,000 copies in its first week. The album was produced by Kris Crummett, Matt Malpass, and the group's keyboardist and disc jockey Tyler "Scout" Acord.

== Background and recording ==
The album's initial release was originally in November 2013, however had been pushed back to February 2014. It is the band's first release with current drummer Josh Manuel after Case Snedecor's departure in early 2013. The band released a teaser for the track, "Stingray Affliction" on November 19, 2013. The official track listing was released on December 7, 2013. The album's first single, "Stingray Affliction" was released on December 18, 2013, along with the album's artwork.

The album was released as a music download, CD and as an LP through Rise Records.

On November 18, 2014, the deluxe edition was released, featuring the Diamond Dreams.

== Critical reception ==
Professional ratings
Review scores
Source	Rating
AllMusic	2.5/5 stars
Alternative Press	4/5 stars
Sputnikmusic	1/5 stars

At Alternative Press, Brian Kraus rated the album four stars out of five stars as he praised the album's DJ-based breakdowns and called the album a mixture of metalcore and post-hardcore with elements of nu metal. Gregory Heaney of AllMusic gave the album a considerably lower score as he criticized the album's sound as the two genres (being metalcore and mainstream pop) saying, "can be a little hard to wrap your head around" and called it a new variant of the old nu metal genre. However, he praised its efforts on some tracks. Sputnikmusic's Robert Lowe expressed negativity against the album, giving it the lowest rating. He criticized the album's use of throwing in random genres with metalcore, including R&B, hip hop and nu metal and stated this failed miserably, calling it a mixture of Limp Bizkit and Justin Bieber elements, and even went as far as to say, "it could be the worst album ever." The album was included at number 16 on Rock Sound's "Top 50 Albums of the Year" list. The album was included at number 43 on Kerrang!'s "The Top 50 Rock Albums Of 2014" list. In 2024, John Hill of Loudwire named it the best metalcore album of 2014.

== Track listing ==
No.	Title	Length
1.	"Sad Ghost"	4:31
2.	"Mad at Myself"	3:50
3.	"Life of a Nine"	3:14
4.	"The Langdon House"	3:57
5.	"Late"	3:33
6.	"Old Dena"	1:35
7.	"Stingray Affliction"	3:38
8.	"Never Lose Your Flames"	3:41
9.	"Personality Cult"	3:53
10.	"Tears on the Runway Pt. 2"	3:57
11.	"The Settlement"	2:32
12.	"Disappear (Remember When)"	5:23
Total length:		43:44

Deluxe edition bonus disc: Diamond Dreams
No.	Title	Length
1.	"Hooligans" (reimagined)	4:06
2.	"Disappear" (reimagined)	3:41
3.	"King of Amarillo" (reimagined)	3:02
4.	"Princeton Ave" (reimagined)	3:45
5.	"Diamond Dreams"	2:26
6.	"Never Lose Your Flames" (reimagined) (featuring Ben Barlow of Neck Deep)	3:36
7.	"Tears on the Runway" (reimagined) (featuring Nylo)	3:28
8.	"The Worst of Them" (reimagined)	3:30

== Personnel ==
Issues

- Tyler Carter – clean vocals, additional unclean vocals
- Michael Bohn – unclean vocals
- AJ Rebollo – guitars
- Tyler "Scout" Acord – turntables, keyboards, synthesizers, programming
- Josh Manuel – drums
- Skyler Acord – bass

Additional artists

- Heather Acord – choir
- Jimmie Herrod – choir
- Sonya Kaye – choir
- Veronica Moss – choir
- Nylo – vocals on track 10

Artwork

- Peter Schreve – artwork, design
- Caitlin Brookins – photography

Production

- Issues – composer
- Kris Crummett – executive producer, producer, engineer, mixing, mastering
- Matt Malpass – executive producer, producer
- Nylo – production
