= Diamond Dreams =

EP by Issues
- Released: November 18, 2014
- Genre: Metalcore; acoustic rock; R&B
- Length: 27:34
- Label: Rise

Issues chronology
Issues (2014)	Diamond Dreams (2014)	Headspace (2016)

Diamond Dreams is the second EP by American metalcore band Issues released on November 18, 2014.

== Background ==
This version of The Worst of Them was released as a music video in late 2012 while Case Snedecor was still their drummer and Jake Vinston was their bassist.

In anticipation of the new EP, the band released the following statement: “We had a lot of fun making this record, being able to reimagine songs and show that we aren’t just metalcore kids, or whatever you wanna call us. We are multitalented, and we aren’t set on one taste of music; we respect and appreciate all variations. Sorry it took so long to put this out, guys!”

== Track listing ==
No.	Title	Length
1.	"Hooligans"	4:06
2.	"Disappear"	3:41
3.	"King of Amarillo"	3:02
4.	"Princeton Ave"	3:45
5.	"Diamond Dreams"	2:26
6.	"NLYF X Neck Deep"	3:36
7.	"Tears on the Runway"	3:28
8.	"The Worst of Them"	3:30
Total length:		27:34

== Personnel ==
Issues

- Tyler Carter – clean vocals
- AJ Rebollo – guitars
- Josh Manuel – drums, percussion
- Skyler Acord – bass
- Tyler "Scout" Acord – keyboards, synthesizers, programming, piano

Additional musicians

- Ben Barlow – guest vocals on "Nlyf X Neck Deep"
- Nylo – guest vocals on "Tears on the Runway"
- Case Snedecor – drums on "The Worst of Them"
- Jake Vinston – bass on "The Worst of Them"

== Charts ==
Chart (2016)	Peak position
US Top Alternative Albums (Billboard)	20
US Top Rock Albums (Billboard)	27
US Independent Albums (Billboard)	13
