= Issues (band) =

American metalcore band

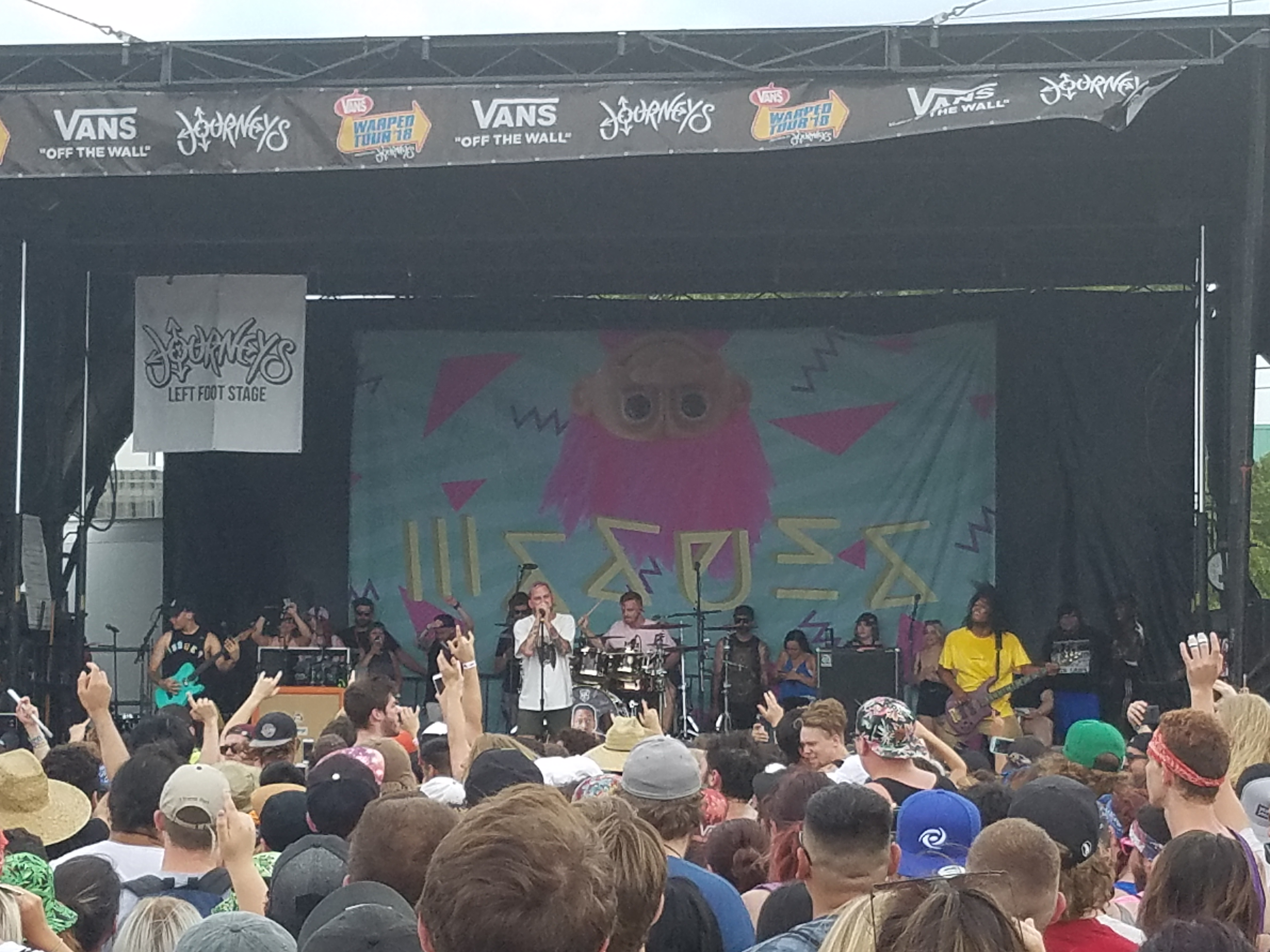
- Issues performing in 2018

Background information
- Origin: Atlanta, Georgia, U.S.
- Genres: Metalcore; R&B; pop metal; nu metal
- Years active: 2012–2020; 2023–2024
- Label: Rise
- Spinoff of: Woe, Is Me
- Past members: Ben Ferris; Cory Ferris; Jake Vintson; Case Snedecor; Tyler Acord; Michael Bohn; Tyler Carter; Skyler Acord; AJ Rebollo; Josh Manuel
- Website: ixiimmxxiv.com

Issues was an American metalcore band based in Atlanta, Georgia, founded in 2012. The band's final lineup consisted of guitarist and vocalist AJ Rebollo, bassist and vocalist Skyler Acord, and drummer Josh Manuel. They were known for their combination of metalcore, nu metal, pop and contemporary R&B.

Following original member Michael Bohn and Tyler Carter's departure from Woe, Is Me, the duo formed Issues with keyboardist Ben Ferris, bassist Cory Ferris, guitarist AJ Rebollo, and drummer Case Snedecor, subsequently signing to Rise Records. The Ferris brothers departed from the group prior to the release of the Black Diamonds EP, in 2012. Snedecor left the band in 2013 and was replaced by drummer Josh Manuel while Ben and Cory Ferris were replaced by keyboardist and disc jockey Tyler Acord and bassist Skyler Acord, respectively. The band released their self-titled debut studio album in 2014, which was praised for its DJ-based breakdowns and mixture of metalcore and electronica, charting at number-nine on the US Billboard 200. They released their remix album, Diamond Dreams, in November 2014. Their second studio album, Headspace, was released in May 2016. On January 4, 2018, it was revealed the band had fired Michael Bohn due to "wanting to go in a different direction". The following year, the group released their third studio album, Beautiful Oblivion, on October 4, 2019. In September 2020, Tyler Carter was fired from the band for multiple accusations of grooming and sexual misconduct. The band would remain inactive until November 2023, when they announced they would be disbanding following three farewell shows slated for January 2024.

Issues won the Alternative Press Music Award for Artist of the Year in 2015 and for Best Bassist the following year, and altogether was nominated for seven Alternative Press Music Awards. The group was nominated for Best New Talent at the 2014 Revolver Golden Gods. The band performed at various music festivals including the Vans Warped Tour, the Reading and Leeds Festivals, and Slam Dunk Festival.

== History ==
=== 2012: Formation and Black Diamonds ===
The project was first announced by former Woe, Is Me vocalist Tyler Carter in 2012, stating that he had plans to create a band with other former members of the band. This included; Michael Bohn, Cory Ferris and Ben Ferris. Before the band started to record their debut EP, titled Black Diamonds, both Cory and Ben Ferris were unable to attend the recording sessions and ultimately left the band. Ben Ferris departed from the band early in September 2012, while Cory Ferris decided to stay with the band until he announced his departure in November 2012. Skyler Acord played bass guitar on the band's debut EP, while his brother Tyler Acord played keyboards and turntables. Both of the Acord brothers were later asked to join the band after the departure of bassist Jake Vintson in early 2013.

The band first started touring as a support act with Attila on their "Party with the Devil Tour", along with support acts Make Me Famous, Ice Nine Kills and Adestria. Their debut EP, Black Diamonds, was released on November 13, 2012. The lead single for Black Diamonds, titled "King of Amarillo", was released on October 2, 2012, along with a lyric video. The band was featured on the Punk Goes Pop 5 compilation album covering "Boyfriend", originally by Justin Bieber.

=== 2013–2015: Self-titled album and Diamond Dreams EP ===
Issues' first release of 2013 was a stand-alone single titled "Hooligans", which was released on July 5 and was accompanied with a music video. In May, drummer Case Snedecor left the band due to musical differences. But in the next month, his successor, Josh Manuel, was announced as the new drummer of the band, making this the fourth lineup change in the band's short history. On May 19, 2013, the band participated in the Vans Warped Tour.

The band was initially set to release their debut album in November 2013, however it was pushed back to January 2014. It was revealed in December that the album was set to be released on February 18, 2014, along with the album details and track list, revealing it to be a self-titled album.

Issues made another release through Fearless Records on the Punk Goes Christmas album, released on November 2, with song "Merry Christmas, Happy Holidays". It was later announced that they would be joining Beartooth on Of Mice & Men UK headlining tour in April as a support act. It was also announced that they would be joining Bring Me the Horizon and Of Mice & Men on their 'American Dream Tour' beginning February 2014 with fellow supporting acts Letlive and Northlane. The band also confirmed that they will be performing the entire Vans Warped Tour 2014.

The band's debut album Issues was released on February 18, 2014. In April, it was announced that the band would perform at 2014's Reading and Leeds Festival. The band were a support act for the Wembley Arena performance in London on December 5 supporting Bring Me the Horizon along with Young Guns and Sleepwave. The band will be headlining in America dubbed the "Journeys Noise: Thanks for the Invite" tour and will be supported by I Killed The Prom Queen, Ghost Town, Marmozets and Nightmares and takes place late October to mid December.

On October 17, 2014, the band confirmed they'd be releasing their first acoustic EP, Diamond Dreams, produced and mixed by the band themselves along with Matt Malpass and various other personnel. The EP was officially released on November 17.

=== 2015–2018: Headspace and Bohn's departure ===
On January 2, 2015, Issues were featured in an article on Alternative Press, in which they stated that the writing and pre-production for their second album would begin on January 23. Ty Acord announced that he wouldn't be touring with Issues during 2015, in order to focus on his work as a music producer. However, he stated that he would still be a member of the band in the studio, and will co-produce the upcoming album, titled Headspace.

Drummer Josh Manuel said that the band was in the studio writing for their second album and that they had booked time, once again, with Kristofer Crummett and Erik Ron in July 2015 to record it. In November 2015, they announced that they will be a five-piece, with Ty leaving to focus on producing music and working with Issues only as a collaborator.

Issues were announced as part of the line-up for Slam Dunk Festival during November 2015.

On January 4, 2018, the band confirmed that they fired vocalist Michael Bohn.

Between recording sessions and the release of the band's upcoming third studio album, vocalist Tyler Carter released his debut solo studio album, Moonshine, on February 1, 2019, on Rise Records.

=== 2019–2024: Beautiful Oblivion, Carter's firing and disbandment ===
On April 9, 2019, Issues announced that they had completed recording sessions and tracking for their upcoming third studio album. In a statement from bass guitarist Skyler Acord, he stated: "We finished our album yesterday, almost two years to the day from the first writing session. It (literally) almost killed us in more ways than one but good art comes from conflict. I can't wait for you to hear what we went through, woven into the music we're all so proud of." On the same day, the band confirmed that they would release a new single "coming soon." Before the album's announcement or promotional tour, the group was set to tour as support on American metalcore band I Prevail's Trauma U.S. Tour, from April 24 to August 9, 2019. While taking online polls via Instagram on what the setlist should be for the upcoming tour, it was announced that the first single for the upcoming album would be released on May 3, 2019, titled "Tapping Out". On August 11, it was announced that the album would be titled Beautiful Oblivion and be released on October 4.

On September 1, 2020, the band announced that founding member and vocalist Tyler Carter had been kicked from the band due to accusations of grooming and sexual misconduct. Following Carter's departure from the band, the three remaining members released an album of instrumental tracks from Beautiful Oblivion on November 20, 2020.

Over the course of the next several years, bassist and vocalist Skyler Acord began working with American musical duo Twenty One Pilots; drummer Josh Manuel began working with American country singer Kane Brown; and guitarist and vocalist AJ Rebollo joined American rock band Bad Wolves.

On November 17, 2023, the band announced a breakup and three farewell shows that will take place in January 2024.

On January 10, 2024, the band released the final single titled "Since I Lost You" with bassist Skyler Acord providing lead vocals.

During the final two farewell shows – both at The Masquerade in Atlanta, GA – the band's ex-member, unclean vocalist Michael Bohn joined the band on stage to perform the Black Diamonds EP in its entirety, along with the single "Hooligans", during the encore portion of the show. The band recorded the farewell shows and will release a selection of song recordings as a double-vinyl live album, Issues Forever, in late summer/early fall 2024.

== Musical style and influences ==
Issues has often been associated with metalcore, having a blend of nu metal, pop, electronic and R&B. AllMusic said the band mixed these genres to obtain "new nu metal", which has also been termed nu metalcore. The band themselves has commented that they wanted to mix metal and "Top 40" music in the same way that nu metal mixed heavy metal music with hip hop music. Other than being labelled as nu metal, Issues has also been labelled as metalcore, "pop/metal" and "R&Bcore". They are influenced by artists and groups such as Korn, Katy Perry, Linkin Park, Michael Jackson, Slipknot, Miley Cyrus, and Kesha.

== Band members ==
Final lineup

- Adrian "AJ" Rebollo – guitars (2012–2024), unclean vocals (2015–2024)
- Skyler Acord – bass guitar (2013–2024; session 2012), clean vocals (2018–2024)
- Josh Manuel – drums (2013–2024)

Touring

- Brian Butcher – clean vocals (2023–2024)

Former

- Tyler Carter – clean vocals, additional unclean vocals (2012–2020)
- Michael Bohn – unclean and backing clean vocals (2012–2018, guest 2024)
- Case Snedecor – drums (2012–2013)
- Ben Ferris – keyboards, synthesizers, unclean vocals (2012)
- Cory Ferris – bass (2012)
- Tyler Acord – turntables, keyboards, synthesizers, keytar, samples, producer, occasional unclean vocals (2013–2015; session 2012, 2015–2024; touring 2024)
- Jake Vintson – bass (2012–2013)

Timeline

== Discography ==
Issues discography
- Studio albums: 3
- Extended plays: 2
- Singles: 16
- Music videos: 15

=== Studio albums ===
Year	Details	Peak chart positions						
Year	Details	US	US Alt.	US Hard Rock	US Rock	US Indie.	AUS	UK
2014	Issues: Release: February 18, 2014; Label: Rise Records; Formats: CD, Download	9	2	1	2	1	50	77
2016	Headspace: Release: May 20, 2016; Label: Rise Records; Formats: CD, Download	20	1	1	4	2	36	73
2019	Beautiful Oblivion: Release: October 4, 2019; Label: Rise Records; Formats: CD, Download	181	20	8	38	—	—	—

=== EPs ===
Year	Details	Peak chart positions				
Year	Details	US	US Alt.	US Hard Rock	US Rock	US Indie.
2012	Black Diamonds: Release: November 13, 2012; Label: Rise Records; Formats: CD, Download	96	20	8	14	31
2014	Diamond Dreams: Release: November 18, 2014; Label: Rise Records; Formats: CD, Download	—	20	—	27	13

=== Singles ===
Year	Song	Album
2012	"King of Amarillo"	Black Diamonds EP
2012	"Princeton Ave"	Black Diamonds EP
2012	"Boyfriend" (Justin Bieber cover)	Punk Goes Pop 5
2012	"The Worst of Them "(Acoustic)	Diamond Dreams EP
2013	"Hooligans"	non-album single
2013	"Merry Christmas, Happy Holidays" ('N SYNC cover)	Punk Goes Christmas
2014	"Stingray Affliction"	Issues
2014	"Never Lose Your Flames"	Issues
2014	"Mad at Myself"	Issues
2016	"The Realest"	Headspace
2016	"Coma"	Headspace
2016	"Blue Wall"	Headspace
2016	"Slow Me Down"	Headspace
2019	"Tapping Out"	Beautiful Oblivion
2019	"Drink About It"	Beautiful Oblivion
2019	"Flexin"	Beautiful Oblivion
2024	"Since I Lost You"	non-album single

=== Music videos ===
Year	Song	Album	Director(s)	Type	Link
2012	"The Worst of Them" (Acoustic)	Diamond Dreams	Josh Manuel	Performance	
2013	"Princeton Ave"	Black Diamonds	Dillon Novak	Narrative	
2013	"Hooligans"	non-album single	Dillon Novak	Narrative	
2014	"Stingray Affliction"	Issues	Ryan Valdez	Narrative	
2014	"Never Lose Your Flames"	Issues	Ryan Valdez	Narrative	
2014	"Mad at Myself"	Issues	Dillon Novak	Narrative	
2016	"The Realest"	Headspace	ANAKT Films	Narrative	
2016	"Coma"	Headspace	Dillon Novak	Narrative	
2016	"Blue Wall"	Headspace	Mollie Tarlow	Performance	
2016	"Slow Me Down"	Headspace	Samuel Halleen	Narrative	
2017	"Home Soon"	Headspace	Max Moore	Performance	
2019	"Tapping Out"	Beautiful Oblivion	Dillon Novak	Performance	
2019	"Drink About It"	Beautiful Oblivion	Dillon Novak, Cole Schwartz	Performance	
2019	"Flexin"	Beautiful Oblivion	Jensen Noen	Narrative	
2020	"Rain"	Beautiful Oblivion	Lorenzo Diego Carrera	Performance	

== Accolades ==
=== Alternative Press Music Awards ===
Year	Nominated work	Award	Result
2014	Issues	Best Breakthrough Band	Nominated
2015	Tyler Carter	Best Vocalist	Nominated
2015	Issues	Album of the Year	Nominated
2015	Issues	Artist of the Year	Won
2016	Skyler Acord	Best Bassist	Won
2016	Issues	Best Live Band	Nominated
2016	Issues	Most Dedicated Fanbase	Nominated

=== Revolver's Golden Gods ===
Year	Nominated work	Award	Result
2014	Issues	Best New Talent	Nominated
