= The Bronx discography =

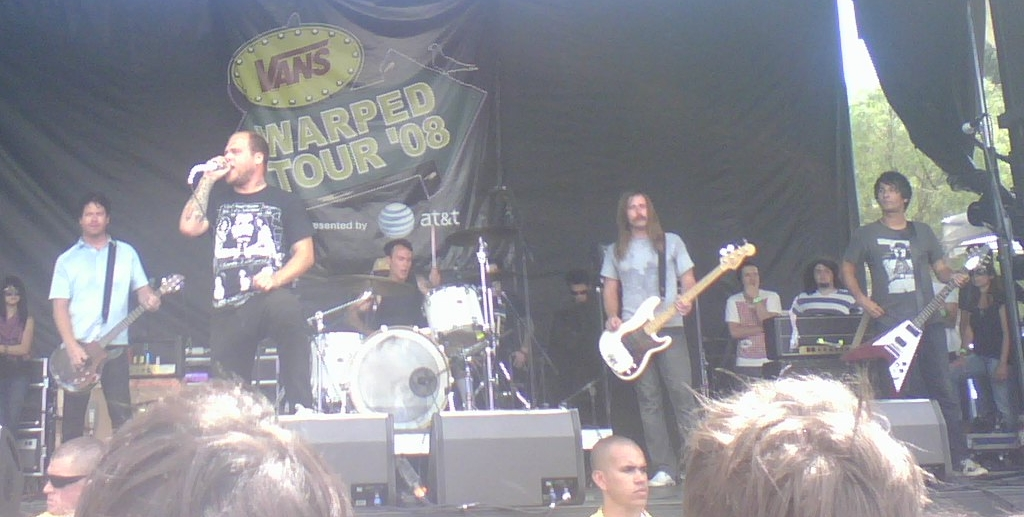
- The Bronx performing on the 2008 Warped Tour
- Studio albums: 6
- Extended plays: 2
- Singles: 8
- Video albums: 1
- Music videos: 11
- Social Club singles: 3
- Other appearances: 3

The discography of The Bronx, a Los Angeles–based punk rock band, consists of six eponymously titled studio albums, two EPs, one DVD, eight singles, two demos, and eleven music videos. This includes releases by the band's mariachi alter-ego Mariachi El Bronx.

The Bronx formed in 2002 with an initial lineup of singer Matt Caughthran, guitarist Joby J. Ford, bassist James Tweedy, and drummer Jorma Vik. After only twelve live performances the band signed to major label Island Def Jam, but opted to put out their early releases independently. They released two demos, both titled Sure Death, in 2002 on their own label, White Drugs. Their first single, "Bats!", was released in July 2003 on Tarantulas Records. Their debut album The Bronx was released in August 2003 through White Drugs and Ferret Records. Later that year Wichita Recordings released La Muerte Viva, an EP exclusive to the United Kingdom and Australia. Wichita has also released all of the singles from The Bronx's albums, beginning with "They Will Kill Us All (Without Mercy)" and "False Alarm" in 2004, which were made into music videos and reached No. 65 and No. 73 on the UK Singles Chart, respectively.

In January 2006 The Bronx released the first two installments of their Social Club series, an exclusive series of singles limited to 250 copies each. The DVD Live at the Annandale followed later that month, documenting a 2004 performance in Sydney. Their only album for Island Def Jam, The Bronx, was released in July 2006 and supported by singles and music videos for "Shitty Future", "History's Stranglers", and "White Guilt". Ken Horne of The Dragons played some guitar parts on the album and soon joined the band as second guitarist. The band also appeared on the soundtrack to the film Snakes on a Plane with a remix of "Around the Horn".

In 2008 The Bronx left Island Def Jam and Brad Magers replaced James Tweedy on bass. That March they recorded two albums, one in a punk rock style and one in a mariachi style. A third Social Club single was released that May, followed by the punk rock album in November. Another eponymous effort, it was released independently on White Drugs and was their first album to reach the Billboard charts, reaching #17 on Top Heatseekers. "Young Bloods" was released as a single, with music videos also filmed for "Knifeman", "Past Lives", and "Inveigh". Mariachi El Bronx followed in September 2009 through Swami Records, who had released the vinyl edition of their 2006 album. "Cell Mates" has been released as a single and music video from the mariachi album, and a video has also been released for "Holy". A second Mariachi El Bronx album followed in August 2011. An EP of cover versions, titled Plys Yr Fvrt Sngs, was released in conjunction with the album.

In a 2009 interview, Caughthran explained the reasoning behind titling all of The Bronx's albums eponymously, citing the desire to place focus on Ford's album artwork: "Joby's a great artist as far as graphic design goes, so the idea behind that is to have the records distinguished by their art instead of some amazing sentence or theme or word."

== Studio albums ==
Year	Album details	Peak chart positions		
Year	Album details	US Heatseekers	AUS	UK
2003	The Bronx: Released: August 26, 2003; Label: White Drugs (WHD 001) / Ferret (F 39); Format: CD, LP	—	88	—
2006	The Bronx: Released: July 18, 2006; Label: White Drugs / Island Def Jam (B0006692); Format: CD, LP	—	—	—
2008	The Bronx: Released: November 3, 2008; Label: White Drugs / Distort (WHD 006); Format: CD, LP	17	98	—
2009	Mariachi El Bronx: Released: September 1, 2009; Label: Swami (SWA 139); Format: CD, LP	—	—	—
2011	Mariachi El Bronx: Released: August 2, 2011; Label: ATO; Format: CD, LP	—	—	—
2013	The Bronx: Released: February 5, 2013; Label: ATO; Format: CD, LP	—	37	—
2014	Mariachi El Bronx: Released: November 4, 2014; Label: ATO; Format: CD, LP	—	—	—
2017	V: Released: September 22, 2017; Label: ATO; Format: CD, LP	—	26	—
2021	VI: Released: August 27, 2021; Label: ATO; Format: CD, LP, digital	—	16	99
"—" denotes albums that were released but did not chart.

== Extended plays ==
Year	Album details
2003	La Muerte Viva: Released: November 15, 2003; Label: Wichita (WEBB 052) / White Drugs; Format: EP
2011	Plys Yr Fvrt Sngs: Released: August 2, 2011; Label: White Drugs; Format: CD

== Singles ==
With the exception of "Bats!", all of The Bronx's singles have only been released in the United Kingdom, through Wichita Recordings. They have been released as CDs and as vinyl 7-inches, with the 7-inches limited to 1,500 copies each.

Year	Single	Peak chart positions	Album
Year	Single	UK	Album
2003	"Bats!"	—	
2004	"They Will Kill Us All (Without Mercy)"	65	The Bronx
2004	"False Alarm"	73	The Bronx
2006	"History's Stranglers"	—	The Bronx
2006	"Shitty Future"	—	The Bronx
2006	"White Guilt"	200	The Bronx
2009	"Young Bloods"	—	The Bronx
2009	"Cell Mates"	—	Mariachi El Bronx
"—" denotes singles that were released but did not chart.

== Social Club singles ==
Each Social Club single is limited to 250 copies on clear vinyl with hand-screened artwork.

Year	Album details	Tracks
2006	Social Club Issue No. One: Released: January 2006; Label: White Drugs; Format: 7"	1. "A Peace in Your Heart" (originally performed by Charles Manson); 2. "Witness (Can I Get A?)" (featuring Keith Morris)
2006	Social Club Issue No. Two: Released: January 2006; Label: White Drugs; Format: 7"	1. "Eyes in the Sky"; 2. "Carmelita" (originally performed by Warren Zevon)
2008	Social Club Issue No. Three: Released: May 2008; Label: White Drugs; Format: 7"	1. "Can't Kill It" (featuring Joe Cardamone); 2. "Dirty Leaves" (featuring Zander Schloss and Keith Dougless)

== Video albums ==
Year	Video details
2006	Live at the Annandale: Released: January 31, 2006; Label: White Drugs (WHD 004) / Livecast Production Studios; Formats: DVD

== Demos ==
A "couple hundred" of each demo were sold at The Bronx's early shows, in white cardboard sleeves with the "Sure Death" logo in red, black, or blue.

Year	Album details	Tracks
2002	Sure Death #1: Released: September 2002; Label: White Drugs; Format: CD	1. "Heart Attack American"; 2. "White Tar"; 3. "Strobe Life"
2002	Sure Death #2: Released: September 2002; Label: White Drugs; Format: CD	1. "False Alarm"; 2. "Kill My Friends"; 3. "Notice of Eviction"

== Music videos ==
Year	Title	Director	Album
2004	"They Will Kill Us All (Without Mercy)"	Mike Piscitelli	The Bronx
2004	"False Alarm"	Mike Piscitelli	The Bronx
2006	"History's Stranglers"	Mike Piscitelli	The Bronx
2006	"Shitty Future"	The Riot Agency	The Bronx
2006	"White Guilt"	Mike Piscitelli	The Bronx
2009	"Young Bloods"	Lokiss	The Bronx
2009	"Knifeman"		The Bronx
2009	"Past Lives"		The Bronx
2009	"Cell Mates"	Josh Litwhiler	Mariachi El Bronx
2009	"Inveigh"		The Bronx
2009	"Holy"	Polite Co.	Mariachi El Bronx
2015	"Wildfires"	Polite Co.	Mariachi El Bronx

== Other appearances ==
The following songs by The Bronx were released on compilation albums, soundtracks, and other releases. This is not an exhaustive list; songs that were first released on the band's albums, EPs, or singles are not included.

Year	Release details	Track(s)
2006	Snakes on a Plane: The Album: Released: September 4, 2006; Label: Decaydance / New Line; Format: CD	"Around the Horn" (Louis XIV remix)
2009	Shred Yr Face Vol. 2: Released: March 4, 2009; Label: Wichita, Matador, Hassle, Coalition (SYF 002); Format: 7"	"She's Like Heroin to Me" (originally performed by The Gun Club)
2009	Purplish Rain: Released: June 23, 2009; Label: Spin; Format: CD	"I Would Die 4 U" (originally performed by Prince)
