= Bronx (disambiguation) =

The Bronx is one of the five boroughs of New York City.

Bronx or The Bronx may also refer to:

- Bronx (cocktail), an alcoholic beverage
- Bronx (gargoyle), a dog-like beast from the television series Gargoyles
- Bronx, Wyoming, small community in Sublette County,
- Bronx River, the river in New York state
- Bronx, codename of WWII double agent Elvira Chaudoir
- The Bronx (band), an American punk rock band that has released five self-titled albums:
  - The Bronx (2003 album)
  - The Bronx (2006 album)
  - The Bronx (2008 album)
  - The Bronx (2013 album)
- The Bronx (Bogotá), an area of Bogotá
- The Bronx, a nickname applied to the Western Sydney suburb of Villawood during the 1990s
