= White Guilt (song) =

Single by The Bronx

from the album The Bronx
- A-side: "White Guilt"
- B-side: "Rockers NYC"
- Released: November 6, 2006
- Recorded: The Pallidrome, Venice, Los Angeles, California
- Genre: Punk rock
- Length: 6:11
- Label: Wichita (WEBB 113S/114S)
- Songwriter(s): Matt Caughthran, Joby J. Ford, James Tweedy, Jorma Vik
- Producer(s): Michael Beinhorn

The Bronx singles chronology
"Shitty Future" (2006)	"White Guilt" (2006)	"Young Bloods" (2009)

Audio sample
- A sample of the song's chorus: file; help

"White Guilt" is a song by the Los Angeles-based punk rock band The Bronx, released as the third single from their 2006 album The Bronx. Gilby Clarke played additional guitar on the song, having produced the band's previous album The Bronx (2003).

While the album was released by the Island Def Jam Music Group, the singles for all of their albums have been released exclusively in the United Kingdom, through Wichita Recordings. The single was released on both compact disc and 7-inch vinyl, the latter pressed on red vinyl and limited to 1,500 copies. The B-side song, "Rockers NYC", is an outtake from the album's recording sessions. The cover artwork was designed by guitarist Joby J. Ford.

The music video for "White Guilt" was directed by Mike Piscitelli. It depicts the band as "out-of-work superheroes and fictional characters", with singer Matt Caughthran in costume as the Easter Bunny, guitarist Joby Ford as a genie, drummer Jorma Vik as a vampire, and bassist James Tweedy as Santa Claus. The four are destitute and spend their day among the homeless, with Ford busking near the beach by taking photos with tourists and families. He becomes upset when another Santa Claus and Easter Bunny begin busking in the same spot, and calls the others over to attack them. The fight is broken up by the police and the band members are arrested.

== Track listing ==
=== CD version ===
All tracks are written by The Bronx.

No.	Title	Length
1.	"White Guilt"	3:46
2.	"Rockers NYC"	2:25
Total length:		6:11

=== Vinyl version ===
Side A
No.	Title	Length
1.	"White Guilt"	3:46

Side B
No.	Title	Length
1.	"Rockers NYC"	2:25
Total length:		6:11

== Personnel ==
=== Band ===
- Matt Caughthran – lead vocals
- Joby J. Ford – guitar, backing vocals, artwork and design
- James Tweedy – bass guitar, backing vocals
- Jorma Vik – drums

=== Additional musicians ===
- Gilby Clarke – guitar

=== Production ===
- Michael Beinhorn – producer, recording
- Ross Hogarth – recording
- Nick Paige – recording assistant
- Mike Shipley – mixing engineer
- Brian Wolgemuth – mixing assistant
- Butch Walker – additional vocal production
- Karl Egsieker – engineer

== See also ==
- The Bronx discography
