= History's Stranglers =

Single by The Bronx

from the album The Bronx
- A-side: "History's Stranglers"
- B-side: "Venice"
- Released: September 4, 2006
- Recorded: The Pallidrome, Venice, Los Angeles, California
- Genre: Punk rock
- Label: Wichita (WEBB 113-S)
- Songwriter(s): Matt Caughthran, Joby J. Ford, James Tweedy, Jorma Vik
- Producer(s): Michael Beinhorn

The Bronx singles chronology
| "False Alarm" (2004) | "History's Stranglers" (2006) | "Shitty Future" (2006) |

Audio sample
- A sample of the pre-chorus and chorus of the song.: file; help

"History's Stranglers" is a song by the Los Angeles-based punk rock band The Bronx, released as the first single from their 2006 album The Bronx.

While the album was released by the Island Def Jam Music Group and the band's own label White Drugs, the singles for all of their albums have been released exclusively in the United Kingdom, through Wichita Recordings. The single was released on both compact disc and 7-inch vinyl, the latter pressed on transparent vinyl and limited to 1,500 copies. The B-side song, "Venice", is an outtake from the album's recording sessions. The cover artwork was designed by guitarist Joby J. Ford.

The music video for "History's Stranglers" was directed by Mike Piscitelli. It depicts camcorder footage of a child's outdoor birthday party, with the band members' heads composited over some of the children's. The children engage in various activities such as playing on a playground and in an inflatable structure, receiving balloon models from a clown, and breaking a piñata. At the end of the video the birthday boy, with the head of singer Matt Caughthran, throws a tantrum and smashes his own birthday cake.

== Track listing ==
=== CD version ===
All tracks are written by The Bronx

| No. | Title | Length |
|---|---|---|
| 1. | "History's Stranglers" | 2:45 |
| 2. | "Venice" |

=== Vinyl version ===
Side A
| No. | Title | Length |
|---|---|---|
| 1. | "History's Stranglers" | 2:45 |

Side B
| No. | Title | Length |
|---|---|---|
| 1. | "Venice" |

== Personnel ==
=== Band ===
- Matt Caughthran – lead vocals
- Joby J. Ford – guitar, backing vocals, artwork and design
- James Tweedy – bass guitar, backing vocals
- Jorma Vik – drums

=== Production ===
- Michael Beinhorn – producer, recording
- Ross Hogarth – recording
- Nick Paige – recording assistant
- Mike Shipley – mixing engineer
- Brian Wolgemuth – mixing assistant
- Karl Egsieker – engineer

== See also ==
- The Bronx discography
