= Young Bloods (song) =

Single by The Bronx

from the album The Bronx
- A-side: "Young Bloods"
- B-side: "Lab Rats"
- Released: March 4, 2009
- Recorded: June 2008 at Big Game Lodge in Van Nuys, Los Angeles, California
- Genre: Punk rock
- Label: Wichita (WEBB 198-S)
- Songwriter(s): Matt Caughthran, Joby J. Ford, Ken Horne, Brad Magers, Jorma Vik
- Producer(s): Dave Schiffman

The Bronx singles chronology
"White Guilt" (2006)	"Young Bloods" (2009)	"Cell Mates" (2009)

Audio sample
- A sample of the song's chorus and beginning of the second verse: file; help

"Young Bloods" is a song by the Los Angeles-based punk rock band The Bronx, released as the first single from their 2008 album The Bronx.

While the album was released by Original Signal Records and the band's own White Drugs label, the singles for all of their albums have been released exclusively in the United Kingdom, through Wichita Recordings. The single was released on 7-inch vinyl and limited to 1,500 copies. The B-side song, "Lab Rats", is an outtake from the album's recording sessions. The cover artwork was designed by guitarist Joby J. Ford.

The music video for "Young Bloods" was directed by French visual artist Lokiss. Mike Piscitelli had directed four of the band's five previous music videos, but was unable to work on "Young Bloods" due to being on a project in Africa. The video shows lucha libre-style wrestlers practicing and sparring in a room. It failed a Harding Test for broadcast in the United Kingdom due to numerous flashes and strobes which could potentially cause seizures in viewers. The band posted the results of the test to their website, noting that "of course we don't wish this upon anyone and feel a bit weird posting something like this. But - the interesting fact is no other broadcast has failed as miserably as our video."

== Track listing ==
=== CD version ===
All tracks are written by The Bronx

No.	Title	Length
1.	"Young Bloods"	2:54
2.	"Lab Rats"	3:41

=== Vinyl version ===
Side A
No.	Title	Length
1.	"Young Bloods"	2:54

Side B
No.	Title	Length
1.	"Lab Rats"	3:41

== Personnel ==
=== Band ===
- Matt Caughthran – lead vocals
- Joby J. Ford – guitar, backing vocals, artwork and design
- Ken Horne – guitar, backing vocals
- Brad Magers – bass guitar, backing vocals
- Jorma Vik – drums

=== Production ===
- Dave Schiffman – producer, recording, mixing engineer
- Howie Weinberg – mastering

== See also ==
- The Bronx discography
