= Shitty Future =

Single by The Bronx

from the album The Bronx
- B-side: "Dirty Leaves"
- Released: October 4, 2006
- Recorded: The Pallidrome, Venice, Los Angeles, California
- Genre: Punk rock
- Label: Wichita (WEBB 113-S)
- Songwriter(s): Matt Caughthran, Joby J. Ford, James Tweedy, Jorma Vik
- Producer(s): Michael Beinhorn

The Bronx singles chronology
"History's Stranglers" (2006)	"Shitty Future" (2006)	"White Guilt" (2006)

Audio sample
- A sample of the pre-chorus and chorus of the song: file; help

"Shitty Future" is a song by the Los Angeles–based punk rock band The Bronx, released as the second single from their 2006 album The Bronx.

While the album was released by the Island Def Jam Music Group and the band's own label White Drugs, the singles for all of their albums have been released exclusively in the United Kingdom, through Wichita Recordings. The single was released on both compact disc and 7-inch vinyl, the latter pressed on black vinyl with a foil-stamped cover and limited to 1,500 copies. The B-side track is a demo version of "Dirty Leaves", another song from the album. The cover artwork was designed by guitarist Joby J. Ford.

The music video for "Shitty Future" consists of a montage of live footage of the band performing the song in concert.

== Track listing ==
=== CD version ===
All tracks are written by The Bronx

No.	Title	Length
1.	"Shitty Future"	2:09
2.	"Dirty Leaves" (demo)

=== Vinyl version ===
Side A
No.	Title	Length
1.	"Shitty Future"	2:09

Side B
No.	Title	Length
1.	"Dirty Leaves" (demo)

== Personnel ==
=== Band ===
- Matt Caughthran – lead vocals
- Joby J. Ford – guitar, backing vocals, artwork and design
- James Tweedy – bass guitar, backing vocals
- Jorma Vik – drums

=== Production ===
- Michael Beinhorn – producer, recording
- Ross Hogarth – recording
- Nick Paige – recording assistant
- Mike Shipley – mixing engineer
- Brian Wolgemuth – mixing assistant
- Karl Egsieker – engineer

== See also ==
- The Bronx discography
