= La Muerte Viva =

La Muerte Viva!

EP by The Bronx
- Released: November 15, 2003
- Recorded: 2003
- Genre: Punk rock
- Length: 14:54
- Label: Wichita Records
- Producer: The Bronx

The Bronx chronology
The Bronx (2003)	La Muerte Viva! (2003)	The Bronx (2006)

La Muerte Viva! is The Bronx's second EP and the first recording on Wichita Records, released on November 15, 2003. The EP was only largely released both in Europe and Australia and being limited edition has since become somewhat of a collector's item.

== Track listing ==
- All tracks by The Bronx, except "Private Affair" written by The Saints

U.K. Version (Wichita Recordings)
No.	Title	Length
1.	"Stop The Bleeding"	3:02
2.	"False Alarm"	2:12
3.	"Bats!"	2:26
4.	"All This Is"	3:03
5.	"You Want To See Us Burn"	2:46
6.	"Private Affair"	2:05

Australian Version (Shock Records)
No.	Title	Length
1.	"They Will Kill Us All (Without Mercy)"	3:50
2.	"Stop The Bleeding"	2:58
3.	"All This Is"	3:01
4.	"Private Affair"	2:05
5.	"Bats!"	2:25
6.	"You Want To See Us Burn"	2:49

The Australian version was printed with the track names in the wrong order on the case as well as in the booklet. On the actual CD "Private Affair" is Track 4 instead of Track 6, "Bats" is Track 5 instead of Track 4 and "You want to see us burn" is Track 6 instead of Track 5. The track listing above matches the order on the CD. The booklet is folded differently from the U.K. Version.

== Personnel ==
- Jorma Vik - drums
- Matt Caughthran - vocals
- Joby J. Ford - Guitar
- James Tweedy - Bass
