= False Alarm (The Bronx song) =

Single by The Bronx

from the album The Bronx
- A-side: "False Alarm"
- B-side: "The Needle and the Damage Done"
- Released: July 5, 2004
- Recorded: The home of Gilby Clarke, Los Angeles
- Genre: Punk rock
- Label: Wichita (WEBB 062-S)
- Songwriter(s): Matt Caughthran, Joby J. Ford, James Tweedy, Jorma Vik
- Producer(s): Gilby Clarke

The Bronx singles chronology
| "They Will Kill Us All (Without Mercy)" (2004) | "False Alarm" (2004) | "History's Stranglers" (2006) |

Audio sample
- A sample of the song's chorus.: file; help

"False Alarm" is a song by the Los Angeles-based punk rock band The Bronx, released as the second single from their 2003 debut album The Bronx. It was their second single to chart, reaching #73 on the UK Singles Chart.

The song is on the soundtrack for Rock Band 3.

While the album was released by Ferret Music and the band's own label White Drugs, the singles for all of their albums have been released exclusively in the United Kingdom, through Wichita Recordings. The single was released on both compact disc and 7-inch vinyl, the latter pressed on translucent green vinyl and limited to 1,500 copies. The B-side song is a cover version of Neil Young's "The Needle and the Damage Done". The cover artwork was designed by guitarist Joby J. Ford.

The music video for "False Alarm" was directed by Mike Piscitelli. The black-and-white video consists of footage from old B-grade horror, science fiction, and thriller films. The band members, performing in white face makeup with heavy dark eye shadow, are composited into the scenes.

== Track listing ==
=== CD version ===
| No. | Title | Writer(s) | Length |
|---|---|---|---|
| 1. | "False Alarm" | The Bronx | 2:12 |
| 2. | "The Needle and the Damage Done" (originally performed by Neil Young) | Neil Young |

=== Vinyl version ===
Side A
| No. | Title | Writer(s) | Length |
|---|---|---|---|
| 1. | "False Alarm" | The Bronx | 2:12 |

Side B
| No. | Title | Writer(s) | Length |
|---|---|---|---|
| 1. | "The Needle and the Damage Done" (originally performed by Neil Young) | Neil Young |

== Personnel ==
=== Band ===
- Matt Caughthran – lead vocals
- Joby J. Ford – guitar, artwork and design
- James Tweedy – bass guitar
- Jorma Vik – drums

=== Production ===
- Gilby Clarke – producer, recording
- Howie Weinberg – mastering

== See also ==
- The Bronx discography
