= Cell Mates (song) =

Single by The Bronx

from the album Mariachi El Bronx
- A-side: "Cell Mates"
- B-side: "I Would Die 4 U"
- Released: August 10, 2009
- Recorded: March 2008 at Brandos Paradise in San Gabriel, California
- Genre: Mariachi
- Label: Wichita (WEBB 227S)
- Songwriter(s): Matt Caughthran, Joby J. Ford, Vincent Hidalgo, Ken Horne, Brad Magers, Jorma Vik
- Producer(s): John Avila

The Bronx singles chronology
"Young Bloods" (2009)	"Cell Mates" (2009)

Audio sample
- A sample of the song's chorus. The mariachi style was in stark contrast to the band's previous hardcore punk and hard rock sound.: file; help

"Cell Mates" is a song by the Los Angeles-based punk rock band The Bronx, released as the first single from their 2009 album Mariachi El Bronx. The album marks a divergence from the band's usual hardcore punk and hard rock sound in favor of a mariachi style. In June 2008 the band posted a video to YouTube of themselves performing "Cell Mates" in mariachi style under the name "Mariachi El Bronx", an alter ego persona that the band has used to promote and perform the album.

While the album was released by Swami Records, the singles for all of their albums have been released exclusively in the United Kingdom, through Wichita Recordings. The single was released as a translucent green 7-inch vinyl and limited to 1,500 copies. The B-side song is a cover version of Prince's "I Would Die 4 U", originally released on the tribute album Purplish Rain in June 2009. The single's cover artwork was designed by guitarist Joby J. Ford.

The music video for "Cell Mates" was directed by Josh Litwhiler and premiered on August 27, 2009. Filmed at La Cita, a bar in downtown Los Angeles, it depicts the band performing while wearing traditional mariachi-style costumes. Though most of the patrons do not acknowledge the band, a young waitress takes notice and stands attentively in front of the stage. As the band continues to play, decorative lights embedded in their costumes begin to illuminate and blink. At the end of the song, red lights in the waitress' shirt illuminate to form a heart over her left breast.

== Track listing ==
Side A
No.	Title	Writer(s)	Length
1.	"Cell Mates"	Mariachi El Bronx	2:36

Side B
No.	Title	Writer(s)	Length
1.	"I Would Die 4 U" (originally performed by Prince)	Prince

== Personnel ==
=== Band ===
- Matt Caughthran – vocals
- Joby J. Ford – guitar, vihuela, jarana, ukulele, requinto romantico
- Vincent Hidalgo – guitarrón, jarana, guitar, requinto romantico
- Ken Horne – guitar
- Brad Magers – horns, backing vocals
- Jorma Vik – drums, percussion

=== Additional musicians ===
- John Avila – charango, backing vocals
- Francesca Fernes – viola
- David Hidalgo – accordion, tresillos, guitar
- Bruce Lee – violin
- Alfredo Ortiz – percussion
- Liza Piccadilly – violin
- Lia Teoni – violin

=== Production ===
- John Avila – producer, recording, engineer, mixing engineer
- Gavin Lurssssen – mastering
- William V. Malpede – string arrangement and conducting

=== Artwork ===
- Joby J. Ford – artwork

== See also ==
- The Bronx discography
