= They Will Kill Us All (Without Mercy) =

Single by The Bronx

from the album The Bronx
- B-side: "I Got Chills"
- Released: April 4, 2004
- Recorded: The home of Gilby Clarke, Los Angeles
- Genre: Punk rock
- Label: Wichita (WEBB 060-S)
- Songwriter(s): Matt Caughthran, Joby J. Ford, James Tweedy, Jorma Vik
- Producer(s): Gilby Clarke

The Bronx singles chronology
"Bats!" (2003)	"They Will Kill Us All (Without Mercy)" (2004)	"False Alarm" (2004)

Audio sample
- A sample of the song's chorus: file; help

"They Will Kill Us All (Without Mercy)" is a song by the Los Angeles–based punk rock band The Bronx, released as the first single from their 2003 debut album The Bronx. It was their first single to chart, reaching No. 65 on the UK Singles Chart.

While the album was released by Ferret Music and the band's own label White Drugs, the singles for all of their albums have been released exclusively in the United Kingdom, through Wichita Recordings. The single was released on both compact disc and 7-inch vinyl, the latter pressed on white vinyl and limited to 1,500 copies. The B-side song is a live recording of "I Got Chills" from a performance at the Three Clubs in Hollywood. The cover artwork was designed by guitarist Joby J. Ford.

The music video for "They Will Kill Us All (Without Mercy)" was directed by Mike Piscitelli. It depicts an African American man in a heavy jacket walking through Los Angeles, lip syncing the song's lyrics while dancing and making exaggerated gestures to the music. The band members appear as extras whom the man bumps into or passes on the street. During the final chorus the man is shot in the chest by an unseen gunman and bleeds to death on the Hollywood Walk of Fame. In a 2009 interview, singer Matt Caughthran named it as his favorite of the band's videos and explained its nature:

The idea behind that video was that if the TV was turned all the way down and there was no sound, it would look like a hip-hop video. The great thing about that was that it actually worked, 'cause I would get interviews, like we were in Sweden for [...] the Hultsfred Festival and I was doing press and I sit down with this lady and she just starts laughing. She goes "I think there's a mistake here. I think this is the wrong band." I'm like "What are you talking about?" She's like "I'm here to interview The Bronx", and I'm like "That's me. I sing for The Bronx." She's like "But you're not black." [...] That was a good moment, 'cause that means the video worked.

== Track listing ==
=== CD version ===
All tracks are written by The Bronx

No.	Title	Length
1.	"They Will Kill Us All (Without Mercy)"	3:49
2.	"I Got Chills" (live)

=== Vinyl version ===
Side A
No.	Title	Length
1.	"They Will Kill Us All (Without Mercy)"	3:49

Side B
No.	Title	Length
1.	"I Got Chills" (live)

== Personnel ==
=== Band ===
- Matt Caughthran – lead vocals
- Joby J. Ford – guitar, backing vocals, artwork and design
- James Tweedy – bass guitar, backing vocals
- Jorma Vik – drums

=== Production ===
- Gilby Clarke – producer, recording
- Howie Weinberg – mastering

== See also ==
- The Bronx discography
