= Mariachi El Bronx (2009 album) =

Studio album by The Bronx
- Released: September 1, 2009
- Recorded: March 2008 at Brandos Paradise in San Gabriel, California
- Genre: Mariachi
- Label: Swami; Wichita
- Producer: John Avila

The Bronx chronology
The Bronx (2008)	Mariachi El Bronx (2009)	Mariachi El Bronx (2011)

Singles from Mariachi El Bronx
- 1. "Cell Mates" Released: August 2009

Professional ratings
Review scores
Source	Rating
BBC	(positive)
Drowned in Sound	8/10
The Fly	3/5
Gigwise	4/5 stars
NME	8/10

Mariachi El Bronx is the fourth studio album by the Los Angeles rock band The Bronx, released on September 1, 2009 through Swami Records in the United States and Wichita Recordings in the United Kingdom. It marks a divergence from the band's usual hardcore punk and hard rock sound in favor of a mariachi style. To promote and perform the album the band adopted the alter ego persona "Mariachi El Bronx", and have performed under both identities concurrently.

== Background ==
The Bronx first expressed intentions to record in a mariachi style in April 2007, when they announced plans to record both a mariachi album and a punk rock album in short succession, hoping to release the former before the end of that summer. However, they did not enter the recording studio until March 2008, by which time they planned to release the mariachi album before the end of the summer. Mariachi El Bronx was recorded in March 2008 at Brandos Paradise in San Gabriel, California with producer and engineer John Avila, who also played charango, sang backing vocals, and mixed the album with the band.

In June 2008 the band posted a video to YouTube of themselves performing "Cell Mates" in mariachi style under the name "Mariachi El Bronx". The punk rock album was released first, on November 11, 2008. Titled The Bronx, it was their third eponymous album. The band supported it with a world tour from September through December 2008 covering Canada, the United States, Europe, the United Kingdom, Australia, and New Zealand, playing with bands such as Bad Religion, Every Time I Die, and Stick to Your Guns. In a December 2008 interview, singer Matt Caughthran commented that "[Mariachi El Bronx] was something that was a part of us that we didn't really realize. I mean, being from Los Angeles and, you know, growing up and surrounded by Mexican culture, it just kind of happened [...] We were writing two or three songs a day for that record, and the lyrics and everything just kind of shit out of all of us [...] it was the funnest and easiest record we've ever made." Guitarist Joby J. Ford, discussing the band's decision to leave Island Records and to release The Bronx on their own label White Drugs, remarked that "I want to be in a band that plays music that I like and also has another band where they play mariachi music."

In March 2009 The Bronx played the South By Southwest festival in Austin, Texas, followed by a tour of the United States ending in June. In an April 2009 interview, Caughthran spoke more about Mariachi El Bronx:

The record's been done for a while now, hopefully it's gonna come out in like early or mid summer. It's a really really important record; it's the best thing I've ever done. It's all original music, traditional mariachi stuff, and it's the punkest thing in the world for a band like The Bronx to put out a record like that. And I know it's gonna fuck a lot of people up. I want to make sure it gets done the right way, so we're being real careful with it. We don't know if we have the manpower ourselves to put it out on White Drugs, so we're trying to see if we can find a label who's in love with it enough to put it out there.

On the impetus for switching styles for the album, Caughthran remarked that many musicians "kind of blow it by not challenging themselves and not listening to their urges, so to speak. A lot of bands play it safe and make the same record over and over again [...] It was just one of those things, where we got asked to do an acoustic thing for Fuel TV, and it's like nothing sucks more than rock bands playing acoustic rock songs. You know, it just sucks. So we did a song mariachi style, and it just opened up this whole thing where we were like 'This is awesome.' So we wrote some songs, and it just became." He speculated that Mariachi El Bronx might tour with The Hold Steady after the album's release, calling it "a whole different outlet – we can go tour with bands The Bronx couldn't go on tour with."

The first Mariachi El Bronx song to see release was a cover of Prince's "I Would Die 4 U", released on the tribute album Purplish Rain in June 2009. The following month the band announced that Mariachi El Bronx would be released on September 1 through Swami Records, who had released the vinyl version of their second album, 2006's The Bronx. In July Spin exclusively debuted the song "Quinceniera" as streaming media on their website. The website Clashmusic.com then offered a free download of "Slave Labor" in August, the same month that Wichita Recordings released a single for "Cell Mates" in the United Kingdom. The band launched a full album stream on Purevolume, followed by the premier of the music video for "Cell Mates" on August 28, 2009.

== Track listing ==
All tracks are written by Mariachi El Bronx

No.	Title	Length
1.	"Cell Mates"	2:38
2.	"Litigation"	4:05
3.	"Despretador"	3:14
4.	"Quinceniera"	3:29
5.	"Sleepwalking"	4:00
6.	"Silver or Lead"	3:50
7.	"Slave Labor"	2:38
8.	"Clown Powder"	4:09
9.	"Holy"	4:45
10.	"My Brother the Gun"	3.34
11.	"My Love"	3:13

== Personnel ==
The Bronx

- Matt Caughthran – vocals
- Joby J. Ford – guitar, vihuela, jarana, ukulele, requinto romantico
- Vincent Hidalgo – guitarrón, jarana, guitar, requinto romantico
- Ken Horne – guitar
- Brad Magers – horns, backing vocals
- Jorma Vik – drums, percussion

Additional musicians

- John Avila – charango, backing vocals
- Francesca Fernes – viola
- David Hidalgo – accordion, tresillos, guitar
- Bruce Lee – violin
- Alfredo Ortiz – percussion
- Liza Piccadilly – violin
- Lia Teoni – violin

Production

- John Avila – producer, recording, engineer, mixing engineer
- Gavin Lurssssen – mastering
- William V. Malpede – string arrangement and conducting

Artwork

- Joby J. Ford – artwork
- Lisa Johnson – photography
