= Rock Sound =

British rock music magazine

- Chester Bennington and Mike Shinoda of Linkin Park on the cover of June 2014 edition
- Categories: Music magazine
- Frequency: Monthly
- Circulation: 14,057
- First issue: 1999
- Company: WhyNow
- Country: United Kingdom
- Language: English
- Website: www.rocksound.tv
- ISSN: 1465-0185

Rock Sound is a British magazine that covers rock music. The magazine aims at being more "underground" and less commercial, while also giving coverage to better-known acts. It generally focuses on pop punk, post-hardcore, metalcore, punk, emo, hardcore, heavy metal and extreme metal genres of rock music, rarely covering indie rock music at all. The tag-line "For those who like their music loud, extreme and non-conformist" is sometimes used. Although primarily aimed at the British market, the magazine is also sold in Australia, Canada and the United States.

== History ==
The British edition of Rock Sound was launched in March 1999 by the French publisher Editions Freeway. The magazine was bought out by its director, Patrick Napier, in December 2004. The magazines offices are in London and Paris. Separate titles with the same name have been published under the same umbrella company in France since 1993, and in Spain since 1998.

The first issue was published in April 1999. Issue 2 featured British band Reef on the front cover, and later issues 3 and 8 featured Terrorvision and Foo Fighters respectively. In July 2011 a host of "Through The Years" articles were written to celebrate the 150th issue of the magazine. 2017 witnessed the first annual Rock Sound Awards where £1 from every magazine bundle sold was donated to the One More Light Fund in memory of Chester Bennington.

The magazine was known for including a free CD in most issues, which had tracks from bands' new albums that have not been released as singles. These were called '100% Volume' or 'The Volumes', with other past compilations named 'Music With Attitude', 'Bugging Your Ears!', 'Sound Check' and 'Punk Rawk Explosion'. Sometimes whole albums were included with the magazine, particularly from bands wanting to gain exposure, including Futures' debut album The Holiday in March 2010, and Burn The Fleet's debut album The Modern Shape in May 2012.

In more recent years, exclusive artist merchandise including t-shirts have been sold alongside the magazine via the Rock Sound web store.

In 2023, Rock Sound became part of WhyNow media group and a special edition magazine was published in partnership with Slam Dunk Festival featuring headliners Enter Shikari and The Offspring on the cover. A weekly digital cover feature, The Album Story, was also launched on ROCKSOUND.TV.

Rock Sound's 300th issue was published in September 2023 with Fall Out Boy, Corey Taylor and Motionless In White appearing on the cover. The magazine will celebrate its 25th anniversary in 2024.

== Audience ==
Year	Circulation
2009	16,374
2010	15,005
2011	14,227
2013	13,220
2015	13,924
2016	14,057

The magazine had a circulation figure of 15,005 from January to December 2010 auditored by ABC. This includes 10,162 sales in the United Kingdom and Ireland, and 4,843 from Other Countries. The same auditing body said the magazine had a slightly lower circulation figure of 14,227 from January to December 2011, with sales of 10,053 from the United Kingdom and Ireland, and 4,174 from Other Countries. The majority of sales come from newstrade, with some coming from subscriptions.

The main rival to the magazine in Britain is Kerrang! because of the similar types of music both magazines cover.

== Album of the Year ==
At the end of every year the magazine lists their favourite 75 albums released in the previous twelve months.

- 1999 – Filter – Title of Record
- 2000 – A Perfect Circle – Mer de Noms
- 2001 – System of a Down – Toxicity
- 2002 – Isis – Oceanic
- 2003 – Hell Is for Heroes – The Neon Handshake
- 2004 – Isis – Panopticon
- 2005 – Coheed and Cambria – Good Apollo, I'm Burning Star IV, Volume One: From Fear Through the Eyes of Madness
- 2006 – The Bronx – The Bronx
- 2007 – Biffy Clyro – Puzzle
- 2008 – Genghis Tron – Board Up the House
- 2009 – Mastodon – Crack the Skye
- 2010 – Bring Me the Horizon – There Is a Hell Believe Me I've Seen It. There Is a Heaven Let's Keep It a Secret
- 2011 – Mastodon – The Hunter
- 2012 – The Menzingers – On the Impossible Past
- 2013 – letlive – The Blackest Beautiful
- 2014 – Lower Than Atlantis – Lower Than Atlantis
- 2015 – Bring Me the Horizon – That's the Spirit
- 2016 – Panic! at the Disco – Death of a Bachelor
- 2017 – All Time Low – Last Young Renegade
- 2018 – Twenty One Pilots – Trench
- 2023 – Sleep Token – Take Me Back to Eden
- 2024 – Twenty One Pilots – Clancy
- 2025 – Sleep Token – Even In Arcadia

== Hall of Fame/Throwback ==
Rock Sound inducted numerous albums into its Hall of Fame, as part of a long-running feature. The main criterion for inclusion was thought to be influence – even within a particular genre – and for that reason many of the albums have been commercially successful as well as critically successful because they have then gone on to influence large numbers of bands or the music scene. Thus this differs from the Yearly Top Albums lists which do not take influence into account. In each article there was normally an interview with band members, a commentary on the album's release, a look at its initial success, and reaction from other musicians or participants in the album's creation - such as producers, engineers, and music video directors. Towards the end of this section's run it was renamed to "Throwback".

Album	Artist	Nationality	Year	Issue	Guest Writer
The Shape of Punk to Come	Refused	Sweden	27 October 1998	#136, June 2010	
Jupiter	Cave In	United States	8 August 2000	#138, August 2010	Jacob Bannon of Converge
Weezer	Weezer	United States	10 May 1994	#139, September 2010	Gustav Woods of Young Guns
Smash	The Offspring	United States	8 April 1994	#140, October 2010	Frank Turner
White Pony	Deftones	United States	20 June 2000	#142, December 2010	
Jane Doe	Converge	United States	4 September 2001	#145, March 2011	Winston McCall of Parkway Drive
Queens of the Stone Age	Queens of the Stone Age	United States	22 September 1998	#146, April 2011	
Hello Rockview	Less Than Jake	United States	6 October 1998	#149, July 2011	
Casually Dressed & Deep in Conversation	Funeral for a Friend	Wales 2	20 October 2003	#151, Summer 2011	
Tell All Your Friends	Taking Back Sunday	United States	26 March 2002	#152, September 2011	
Relationship of Command	At the Drive-In	United States	12 September 2000	#153, October 2011	
From Under the Cork Tree	Fall Out Boy	United States	3 May 2005	#155, December 2011	
New Found Glory	New Found Glory	United States	26 September 2000	#158, March 2012	
The Artist in the Ambulance	Thrice	United States	22 July 2003	#159, April 2012	
Good Mourning	Alkaline Trio	United States	13 May 2003	#160, May 2012	
Start Something	Lostprophets	Wales 2	2 February 2004	#161, June 2012	Aled Phillips of Kids In Glass Houses
Ideas Above Our Station	Hundred Reasons	United Kingdom	20 May 2002	#162, July 2012	Rou Reynolds of Enter Shikari, Frank Turner
Suicide Season	Bring Me the Horizon	United Kingdom	29 September 2008	#164, Summer 2012	Sam Carter of Architects
A Fever You Can't Sweat Out	Panic! at the Disco	United States	27 September 2005	#165, September 2012	Pete Wentz of Fall Out Boy; Mike Ferri of We Are the In Crowd
The Used	The Used	United States	25 June 2002	#166, October 2012	Chris Pennells of Deaf Havana
The Young and the Hopeless	Good Charlotte	United States	30 September 2002	#167, November 2012	
Alive or Just Breathing	Killswitch Engage	United States	21 May 2002	#168, December 2012	Matt Heafy of Trivium
Ascendancy	Trivium	United States	15 March 2005	#171, March 2013	
What It Is to Burn	Finch	United States	12 March 2002	#172, April 2013	
The Bronx	The Bronx	United States	26 August 2003	#173, May 2013	
Love Metal	HIM	Finland	14 April 2003	#174, June 2013	
Infest	Papa Roach	United States	25 April 2000	#175, July 2013	
Tomorrow Come Today	Boysetsfire	United States	1 April 2003	#176, August 2013	
As the Palaces Burn	Lamb of God	United States	6 May 2003	#177, Summer 2013	
Bleed American	Jimmy Eat World	United States	24 July 2001	#178, September 2013	
Take to the Skies	Enter Shikari	United Kingdom	19 March 2007	#179, October 2013	
Miss Machine	The Dillinger Escape Plan	United States	20 July 2004	#180, November 2013	
Good Apollo, I'm Burning Star IV, Volume One: From Fear Through the Eyes of Madness	Coheed and Cambria	United States	20 September 2005	#181, December 2013	
Gutter Phenomenon	Every Time I Die	United States	23 August 2005	#184, March 2014	
Perseverance	Hatebreed	United States	12 March 2002	#185, April 2014	
Chocolate Starfish and the Hot Dog Flavored Water	Limp Bizkit	United States	17 October 2000	#186, May 2014	
A Place in the Sun	Lit	United States	23 February 1999	#187, June 2014	
The Trees Are Dead & Dried Out Wait for Something Wild	Sikth	United Kingdom	18 August 2003	#188, July 2014	
Superunknown	Soundgarden	United States	8 March 1994	#189, August 2014	
Punk in Drublic	NOFX	United States	19 July 1994	#191, September 2014	
Hollow Crown	Architects	United Kingdom	26 January 2009	#192, October 2014	
Slaughter of the Soul	At the Gates	Sweden	14 November 1995	#193, November 2014	
Get Some	Snot	United States	27 May 1997	#197, March 2015	
Follow the Leader	KoЯn	United States	18 August 1998	#198, April 2015	
Crisis	Alexisonfire	Canada	22 August 2006	#202, August 2015	
Nothing Personal	All Time Low	United States	7 July 2009	#203, Summer 2015	
The Gift of Game	Crazy Town	United States	9 November 1999	#204, September 2015	
Menace to Sobriety	OPM	United States	15 August 2000	#205, October 2015	
This War Is Ours	Escape the Fate	United States	21 October 2008	#206, November 2015	
Anthology	Alien Ant Farm	United States	6 March 2001	#207, December 2015	
The Best in Town	The Blackout	Wales 2	25 May 2009	#210, March 2016	
Nightmare Anatomy	Aiden	United States	4 October 2005	#211, April 2016	
Saosin	Saosin	United States	26 September 2006	#212, May 2016	
Ocean Avenue	Yellowcard	United States	22 July 2003	#213, June 2016	
Billy Talent	Billy Talent	Canada	16 September 2003	#214, July 2016	

== Rock Sound Records ==
In 2019, Rock Sound introduced a new venture titled Rock Sound Records, a sub-brand of Rock Sound offering and distributing music in limited physical formats, such as cassette tapes and vinyl records. Generally, this involves the exclusive physical release of a record released by a band that is signed to a different (major) record label. For instance, the first Rock Sound Records release was a cassette tape version of Simple Creatures′ debut EP Strange Love, while the band is currently signed to BMG.

=== Discography ===
#	Artist	Title	Release date	Format
1.	Simple Creatures	Strange Love	22 March 2019	Cassette tape
2.	PUP	Morbid Stuff	27 March 2019	Cassette tape
3.	Boston Manor	Welcome to the Neighbourhood	10 May 2019	Cassette tape
4.	Real Friends	Even More Acoustic Songs	17 May 2019	Vinyl record
5.	Sum 41	Order in Decline	31 May 2019	Cassette tape
6.	Crown the Empire	Sudden Sky	24 June 2019	Vinyl record + magazine
7.	Knocked Loose	A Different Shade Of Blue	7 August 2019	Cassette tape
8.	Issues	Beautiful Oblivion	12 August 2019	Vinyl record
9.	Waterparks	Fandom	30 August 2019	Vinyl record + cassette tape
10.	Grayscale	Nella Vita	3 September 2019	Cassette tape

== See also ==
- Kerrang!
- NME
- Metal Hammer
- Alternative Press
