= Cell Mates =

Cell Mates may refer to:

- Cell Mates (album), a 1996 album by Bowling for Soup
- Cell Mates (play), a 1995 play by Simon Gray
- "Cell Mates" (song), a 2009 song by The Bronx

== See also ==
- Cellmates, a 2011 American comedy film
- Prison cell
