= Cheatahs (album) =

Studio album by Cheatahs
- Released: 11 February 2014
- Genre: Shoegaze, noise rock, alternative rock
- Length: 45:44
- Label: Wichita

Professional ratings
Aggregate scores
Source	Rating
Metacritic	79/100
Review scores
Source	Rating
AllMusic	4/5 stars
Exclaim!	9/10
The A.V. Club	B+

Cheatahs is the debut studio album by London-based band Cheatahs. It was released in February 2014 by Wichita Recordings.

== Track list ==
No.	Title	Length
1.	"I"	0:41
2.	"Geographic"	3:29
3.	"Northern Exposure"	2:53
4.	"Mission Creep"	4:56
5.	"Get Tight"	3:24
6.	"The Swan"	4:22
7.	"IV"	5:11
8.	"Leave to Remain"	2:56
9.	"Kenworth"	6:03
10.	"Fall"	3:23
11.	"Cut the Grass"	4:09
12.	"Loon Calls"	4:17
