= Peggy Sue (disambiguation) =

"Peggy Sue" is a 1957 song by Buddy Holly.

Peggy Sue may also refer to:

- Peggy Sue (singer) (born 1943), American country singer and songwriter
- Peggy Sue (band), British folk/pop band
- "Peggy Sue", 1995 song from Blink-182's album Cheshire Cat, see Cheshire Cat (Blink-182 album)
- Peggy Sue Got Married, 1986 film directed by Francis Ford Coppola
- Peggy Sue's Diner, notable 1950s style American diner in Yermo, California
- "Peggy Sue", nickname of Australian politician Peter Dutton
