= In Our Space Hero Suits =

Studio album by Those Dancing Days
- Released: 2008
- Genre: Indie rock, Indie pop
- Length: 39:36
- Label: Wichita

Those Dancing Days chronology
In Our Space Hero Suits (2008)	Daydreams & Nightmares (2011)

In Our Space Hero Suits is the debut LP by Those Dancing Days. The album was released on 13 October 2008 by Wichita Recordings. Three years later, the band produced the full-length album, Daydreams & Nightmares.

== Artwork ==
The hand-drawn and hand-painted album cover art was created by group members Cissi Efraimsson and Rebecka Rolfart.

== Track listing ==
In Our Space Hero Suits
No.	Title	Writer(s)	Length
1.	"Knights in Mountain Fox Jackets"		0:06
2.	"Falling in Fall"	Rebecka Rolfart	3:27
3.	"I Know Where You Live"	Rebecka Rolfart	3:08
4.	"Run Run"	Mimmi Evrell	3:17
5.	"Hitten"	Linnea Jönsson	3:32
6.	"Actionman"	Cissi Efraimsson	3:31
7.	"Shuffle"	Linnea Jönsson, Mimmi Evrell	3:31
8.	"Home Sweet Home"	Those Dancing Days	3:14
9.	"Duet Under Waters"	Rebecka Rolfart	3:56
10.	"Kids"	Rebecka Rolfart	3:18
11.	"Those Dancing Days"	Those Dancing Days	3:13
12.	"Spaceherosuits"	Mimmi Evrell	5:33

== Personnel ==
- Linnea Jönsson – Vocalist
- Mimmi Evrell – Bass
- Rebecka Rolfart – Guitar
- Cissi Efraimsson – Drums
- Lisa Pyk – Hammond Organ
