= The Drips =

American punk rock band

- Origin: Los Angeles, California, U.S.
- Genre: Punk rock
- Years active: 2001–present
- Labels: White Drugs, Wichita Recordings, Riot Style
- Members: Matt Caughthran; Joby J. Ford; Tony Bevilacqua; David Hidalgo Jr. Vincent Hidalgo

The Drips is an American punk rock band from Los Angeles, California, United States, currently signed to White Drugs/Wichita Recordings.

== History ==
A side-project of members of various other bands, The Drips are Matt Caughthran and Joby J. Ford, both from The Bronx, Tony Bevilaqua from The Distillers, David Hidalgo Jr. from Suicidal Tendencies and Social Distortion and Vincent Hidalgo from Bullet Treatment and Mariachi el Bronx.

Due to the touring duties of the members' different bands, The Drips were extremely inactive for their first five years. Their first album, self-titled "The Drips," was released in April 2006 mid-way through a UK tour. The album received many favorable reviews, with critics hailing their sound as "muscular and melodic... a thrilling blur"

The band reunited in 2016 for a handful of shows in their native California. Recordings from two shows were released digitally.

== Discography ==
- "Live Cuts" (White Drugs) digital-only - 2016
- "The Drips" (Riot Style) 2xLP Vinyl - scheduled September, 2010
- BBC Sessions - released 2009
- Broken (Wichita) 7" - released April 10, 2006
- The Drips (Wichita) album - released April 26, 2006
- 16 16 Six (Wichita) 7" - released May 5, 2006
- Mexico (Hostage) 7" - released 2003

== Videography ==
- 16, 16, Six (2006)
