= David Hidalgo Jr. =

American drummer (born 1984)

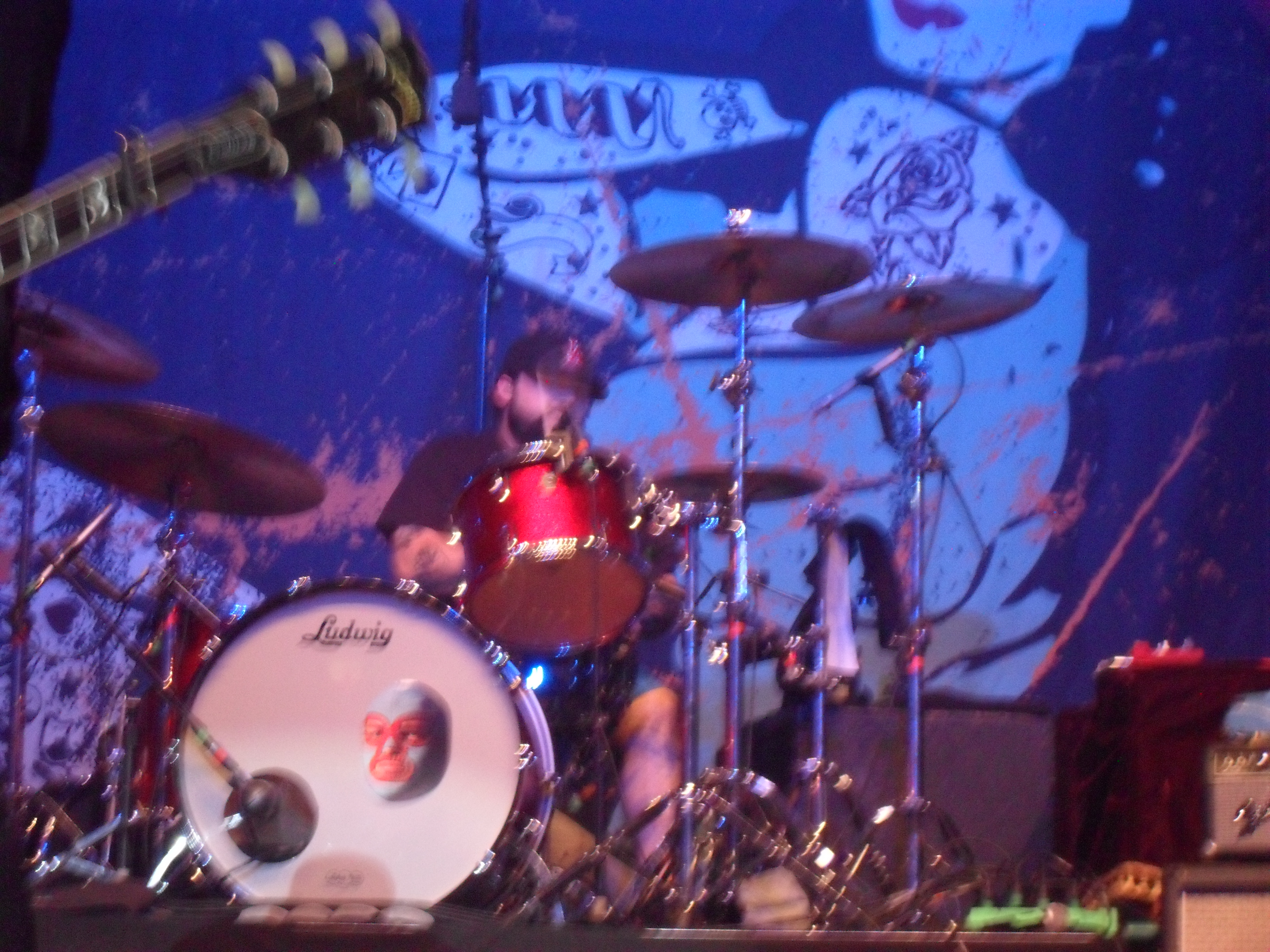

Background information
- Born: August 30, 1984 (age 41); Los Angeles, California, US
- Genres: Punk rock, Mariachi
- Occupation: Musician
- Instruments: Drums, percussion
- Years active: 2004–present
- Member of: Social Distortion, Mariachi El Bronx
- Formerly of: The Bronx, The Drips, Suicidal Tendencies, Bullet Treatment, Spinnerette

David Hidalgo Jr. (born August 30, 1984) is an American drummer who plays in the punk rock band Social Distortion.

== Early life, family and education ==
Hidalgo was born in Los Angeles, California. He is the son of David Hidalgo, guitarist and singer of Los Lobos. The young David began playing drums at age four.

== Career ==
Hidalgo decided to become a career musician at age 20. He began playing with Suicidal Tendencies in 2002 until about 2007. He also played drums for The Bronx/Mariachi El Bronx (beginning in 2015 on a tour and later in 2016 as a member) as well as its side project The Drips and the hardcore punk band Bullet Treatment with a variety of line-ups that also included members of Rise Against, The Bronx, Cancer Bats, Anti-Flag and others.

Joining Social Distortion in 2010, he replaced former drummer Scott Reeder, who had been busy with his main project Fu Manchu. David also toured with Brody Dalle in her Spinnerette and self-titled projects. He has recorded and toured with Chuck Ragan and Dave Hause. He also recorded on a Greg Graffin solo album.

== Instruments and equipment ==
Hidalgo uses and endorses:

- Ludwig drums
- Zildjian cymbals
- Remo drumheads
- Vater percussion and drumsticks
