= The Orange Glow =

2015 album by Globelamp

Studio album by Globelamp
- Released: October 27, 2015
- Recorded: 2015
- Genre: Indie folk, psychedelic folk
- Length: 49:27
- Label: Psychedelic Thriftstore Recordings, Wichita Recordings
- Producer: Elizabeth Le Fey, Joel Jerome

Globelamp chronology
Stardust (2014)	The Orange Glow (2015)	Romantic Cancer (2018)

The Orange Glow is the second album by Globelamp, the indie psychedelic folk project of singer-songwriter Elizabeth Le Fey. The album was reportedly written “as a reflection of the last year and a half and how [she] got out of it alive.” That period included both a breakup and the death of her best friend.

== Music and lyrics ==
The album explores La Fey’s own journey in a folky, ethereal musical one. With a voice that can be either ethereal or savage, shimmery as California sunshine through the leaves of redwoods, or dark as a Washington rainstorm, but always haunting, Globelamp sings of loss, longing, survival and the enchantments of nature. From the hopeful ‘Washington Moon’ to ‘Controversial/Confrontational’, she switches from an almost fawn-like innocence, to savage snarls of “men cannot be trusted”. Between tracks like ‘Artist/Traveler’ and title track ‘The Orange Glow’, and those like ‘Piece of Pie’, the album explores the lure of the “orange glow” and Le Fey’s mission to escape it.

== Release and reception ==
Prior to its wider 2016 issue by Wichita Recordings, the album was initially released on cassette October 27, 2015 through Psychedelic Thriftstore Recordings.

Professional ratings
Review scores
Source	Rating
AllMusic	3.5/5 stars
DIY	4/5 stars
Louder Than War	7.0/10 stars
The Skinny	3/5 stars
Record Collector	2/5 stars

In an AllMusic review, Paul Simpson states "Elizabeth Le Fey performs an intensely personal brand of lo-fi indie folk. Her voice has an appropriately mystical quality to it, stretching words out and bending the tempos in order to dramatically emphasize the lyrics. Musically, her songs sound like a slightly more pop-focused update of the early material by artists like Devendra Banhart and Joanna Newsom, dating from the mid-2000s era when people used the term "freak folk" to describe this sort of thing. It has a distinctly Northwestern indie sensibility to it, with loose, reverb-covered drums crashing in the back of the mix and a general shambolic, D.I.Y. feel."

Louder Than War editor Sarah Lay follows The Orange Glow in a retrospective review. "The story of The Orange Glow is as cautionary as any fairytale; pretty, ethereal and other-wordly, a shimmering surface below which lurks a savage darkness that turns dream to nightmare. The entrancing orange glow which Globelamp followed becomes the dizzying and garish fairground lights spinning through the life of Elizabeth Le Fey. The art and the artist are hopelessly enmeshed in this record; the personal reflections whimsically woven through a mix of neo-psychedelia and folk noir are cast in deeper shadow by what came after the record’s release as much as what came before. For when Globelamp sings of riding a train with no one beside her and of being invisible, when she sings this in gauzy and ever so slightly discordant tones, there is a foreboding sense of the rejection and isolation of the real world Elizabeth Le Fey lurking. When Globelamp sings hauntingly of invisible prisms, the words gently placed between tissue-soft layers, harmonising only with herself, the ghosts of outcast women are stood silent and watchful around Le Fey as she speaks out over and over."

It was described by The Fader as a “folk song for a new weirder America” and having “the sparse melancholy that made The Milk-Eyed Mender so bewitching, plus the haunted schoolyard vibe of outsider family band The Shaggs.”

Melissa Svensen at Gigsluts, UK in a review described the album as something that could be muddled and confusing, but rather ends up being completely hypnotising. Ethereal, almost manic at times, but overall incredibly refined, drawing on a series of influences – psychedelic, punk and folk blended with the supernatural and fairytales.

== Track listing ==
No.	Title	Length
1.	"Washington Moon"	2:58
2.	"Controversial/Confrontational"	3:19
3.	"The Negative"	4:42
4.	"Moon Proof"	5:10
5.	"Artist/Traveler"	4:10
6.	"Don't Go Walking in the Woods Alone at Night"	3:05
7.	"The Orange Glow"	4:55
8.	"Invisible Prisms"	5:28
9.	"Master of Lonely"	3:58
10.	"Piece of the Pie"	3:25
11.	"San Francisco"	4:25
12.	"Faerie Queen"	3:52
Total length:		49:27

== Personnel ==
- Elizabeth Le Fey - songwriter, composer, producer, artwork
- Maia Hisamoto - composer
- Joel Jerome - engineer, producer
- Colin Pleasants - violin
- Eliva Lexa - photography
- Ammo Bankoff - photography
