= V (The Bronx album) =

Studio album by The Bronx
- Released: September 22, 2017
- Length: 34:33
- Label: ATO
- Producer: Rob Schnapf

The Bronx chronology
Mariachi El Bronx (2014)	V (2017)	Dead Tracks, Vol. 1 (2019)

V (stylized as BRVNX) is the fifth studio album by American hardcore punk band The Bronx, excluding the three albums they recorded under the Mariachi El Bronx name. It was released in September 2017 under ATO Records.

== Track listing ==
No.	Title	Length
1.	"Night Drop at the Glue Factory"	3:07
2.	"Stranger Danger"	2:56
3.	"Side Effects"	3:24
4.	"Fill the Tanks"	3:01
5.	"Channel Islands"	3:24
6.	"Two Birds"	3:13
7.	"Sore Throat"	2:32
8.	"Past Away"	2:53
9.	"Cordless Kids"	3:31
10.	"Broken Arrow"	3:06
11.	"Kingsize"	3:26

== Critical reception ==
Professional ratings
Aggregate scores
Source	Rating
Metacritic	66/100
Review scores
Source	Rating
AllMusic	4/5 stars
Classic Rock	3.5/5 stars
DIY	3/5 stars
Drowned In Sound	7/10
Exclaim!	7/10
Kerrang!	4/5 stars
The Line of Best Fit	5.5/10
Magnet	1/5 stars
Q	4/5 stars

V received mixed to positive reviews from music critics. On review aggregator website, Metacritic, V received an average critic score of 66 out of 100 indicating "generally favorable reviews".

== Charts ==
Chart (2017)	Peak position
Australian Albums (ARIA)	26
US Top Current Albums (Billboard)	62
US Heatseekers Albums (Billboard)	5
US Independent Albums (Billboard)	20
US Top Hard Rock Albums (Billboard)	18

== Accolades ==
Publication	Accolade	Year	Rank	Ref.
Kerrang!	Top 50 Albums of 2017	2017	19	
Metal Hammer	Top 100 Albums of 2017	2017	54	
