= Futures (band) =

English rock band

- Origin: Buckinghamshire, England
- Genres: Rock, pop-punk, alternative rock
- Years active: 2009–2012
- Labels: Indigo, Mercury
- Members: Ant West; Casey Roarty; Christian Ward; George Lindsay
- Website: wearefutures.co.uk

Futures were a four-piece rock band from Buckinghamshire, England. Futures received modest reviews and a smattering of fans while remaining unsigned with their debut Mini Album, The Holiday. The band were signed to self made label, Indigo, after leaving Major Label Mercury Records in April 2012.

== History ==
Futures formed when friends Ant West, Casey Roarty and George Lindsay disbanded from previous band Tonight Is Goodbye and looked to start something new. They soon added bassist Christian Ward (formerly of The Riverclub) and reinvented themselves as Futures.

In September 2009, the band's first gig as Futures, at The Barfly in Camden, London, completely sold out.

== The Holiday (2010) ==
In issue 133 of Rock Sound magazine, March 2010, Futures gave away their debut mini album, The Holiday, free of charge, leading the issue to becoming the biggest selling copy of the magazine in two years. The album was later made available for purchase via the band's website. The album was originally going to be released as a free download from the band's website until Rock Sound suggested the idea of a covermount release. The Holiday has been very well received, with the majority of reviews being positive. Kerrang! gave a positive review stating that it was "an album of gloriously uplifting tunes" and giving the album a KKKK rating. Rock Sound's review was also very positive saying about the album, "it's gorgeous, it's rocking and it paints Futures as a very exciting prospect indeed". The album also gained a 9/10 rating. The review on Punktastic stated that The Holiday "is going to set them apart from all of the more established acts doing this kind of thing. Kids in Glass Houses apart, I doubt there's a band doing this style of music any better" and that saying that "the future is very bright." The album was re-released through the band's website on 19 April 2010, with bonus acoustic tracks.

On 23 June 2010, the band announced that they had signed with a major record label Mercury Records.

Futures embarked on a sold-out headline tour UK tour in September 2010, selling out the London Borderline in less than 48 hours.

== 2011 ==
The band went in the studio in February 2011 to record with the Grammy Award winning record producer, Gil Norton, for their next album. In May/June 2011 they played their second sold out UK tour, with support from Lower Than Atlantis and Pegasus Bridge. They released the single, 'Start A Fire', with Mercury on 11 November 2011 and embarked on 'The Far Reaches Tour', seeing the band visit every corner of the UK and playing towns usually unnoticed by touring bands.

The band have been played on television shows, including Hollyoaks, Coronation Street, Emmerdale, Made in Chelsea, Sky Sports 1 and Sky Sports Formula.

== 2012 ==
Since then, the band have been gearing up to release their debut record, since its recording in April 2011. However, on 2 April 2012 the band announced that they had decided to leave Mercury Records, with a statement made by lead singer, Ant West; "We have been restricted over the past two years as to how much music we have been able to share with you. This has been one of the most frustrating parts about being signed to a major record label, no longer being in control of releases. We recorded our album one year ago and it is yet to surface so we decided to take the matter into our own hands. We wrote fifty-six songs for our album and you guys have only had access to two of them: we’ve wanted to give you more but it’s been an impossibility. Today we decided to leave Mercury Records, and the team there were kind and understanding enough to let us take our album with us."

On the day of the announcement the band also postponed their upcoming April tour to July. They released the track, 'Swim Teams', as an apology for those who had bought tickets to the tour, and thank them for being patient for the past year.

On 8 April Futures announced the launch of their independent self-owned label, Indigo, through whom they released their new album in June 2012.

On 31 October Futures released an announcement on their Facebook page about their decision to break up. They played one last show on 12 December at The Garage in London.

== The Karma Album (2012) ==
Futures released a new single 'Karma Satellite' through Indigo Records on 6 May 2012, their first release under their own label. 100 hand made copies were released and sold out within a matter of minutes. The official video, filmed in North East England, has been played on Channel 4, MTV and NME music video channels. Following this, the band released 'Futures and Friends', a live session which saw members of the band and 20 friends playing Karma Satellite in London's British Grove Studios. On 16 May 2012 Futures revealed the title, artwork and release date of their new album, 'The Karma Album', set for release on Indigo in June 2012. The Karma Album was released on 17 June 2012 digitally and through the band's own store. The album went to number 1 on the iTunes Rock Chart and hit the iTunes top 40 album chart. The Karma Tour saw the band on their 3rd UK headline tour, playing songs from the newly released record.

== Band members ==
- Ant West – vocals, guitar
- Casey Roarty – guitar
- Christian Ward – bass
- George Lindsay – drums

== Discography ==
=== Studio albums ===
Year	Album details
2010	The Holiday: Release date: 3 March 2010; Label: self-released
Year	Album details
2012	The Karma Album: Release date: 17 June 2012; Label: Indigo Records

=== Singles ===
Year	Single	Album
2010	"The Boy Who Cried Wolf"	The Holiday
2010	"Sal Paradise"	The Holiday
2012	"Start A Fire"	The Karma Album
2012	"Karma Satellite"	The Karma Album
