= Render Another Ugly Method =

Studio album by Mothers
- Released: September 7, 2018
- Length: 57:19
- Label: Anti-

Mothers chronology
When You Walk A Long Distance You Are Tired (2016)	Render Another Ugly Method (2018)

Singles from Render Another Ugly Method
- 1. "Blame Kit" Released: June 22, 2018; 2. "Pink" Released: July 24, 2018

Render Another Ugly Method is the second studio album by American experimental band Mothers. It was released on September 7, 2018, under Anti-.

== Release ==
On June 22, 2018, the band announced the release of the album, along with the first single "Blame Kit". The second single "Pink" was released on July 24, 2018.

== Critical reception ==
Professional ratings
Aggregate scores
Source	Rating
Metacritic	73/100
Review scores
Source	Rating
AllMusic	3.5/5 stars
Consequence of Sound	C
DIY	4/5 stars
Exclaim!	8/10
The Line of Best Fit	7/10
Loud and Quiet	7/10
MusicOMH	4/5 stars
The Skinny	4/5 stars
Under the Radar	3/10

Render Another Ugly Methord was met with "generally favorable" reviews from critics. At Metacritic, which assigns a weighted average rating out of 100 to reviews from mainstream publications, this release received an average score of 73, based on 12 reviews. Aggregator Album of the Year gave the release a 70 out of 100 based on a critical consensus of 14 reviews.

== Track listing ==
Render Another Ugly Method track listing
No.	Title	Length
1.	"Beauty Routine"	3:16
2.	"Pink"	6:50
3.	"It Is a Pleasure to Be Here"	5:15
4.	"Blame Kit"	4:15
5.	"Baptist Trauma"	3:20
6.	"Western Medicine"	5:34
7.	"Circle Once"	4:56
8.	"Mutual Agreement"	5:41
9.	"Mother and Wife"	7:53
10.	"Wealth Center"	4:16
11.	"Fat Chance"	6:03
