= Elizabeth le Fey =

American musician

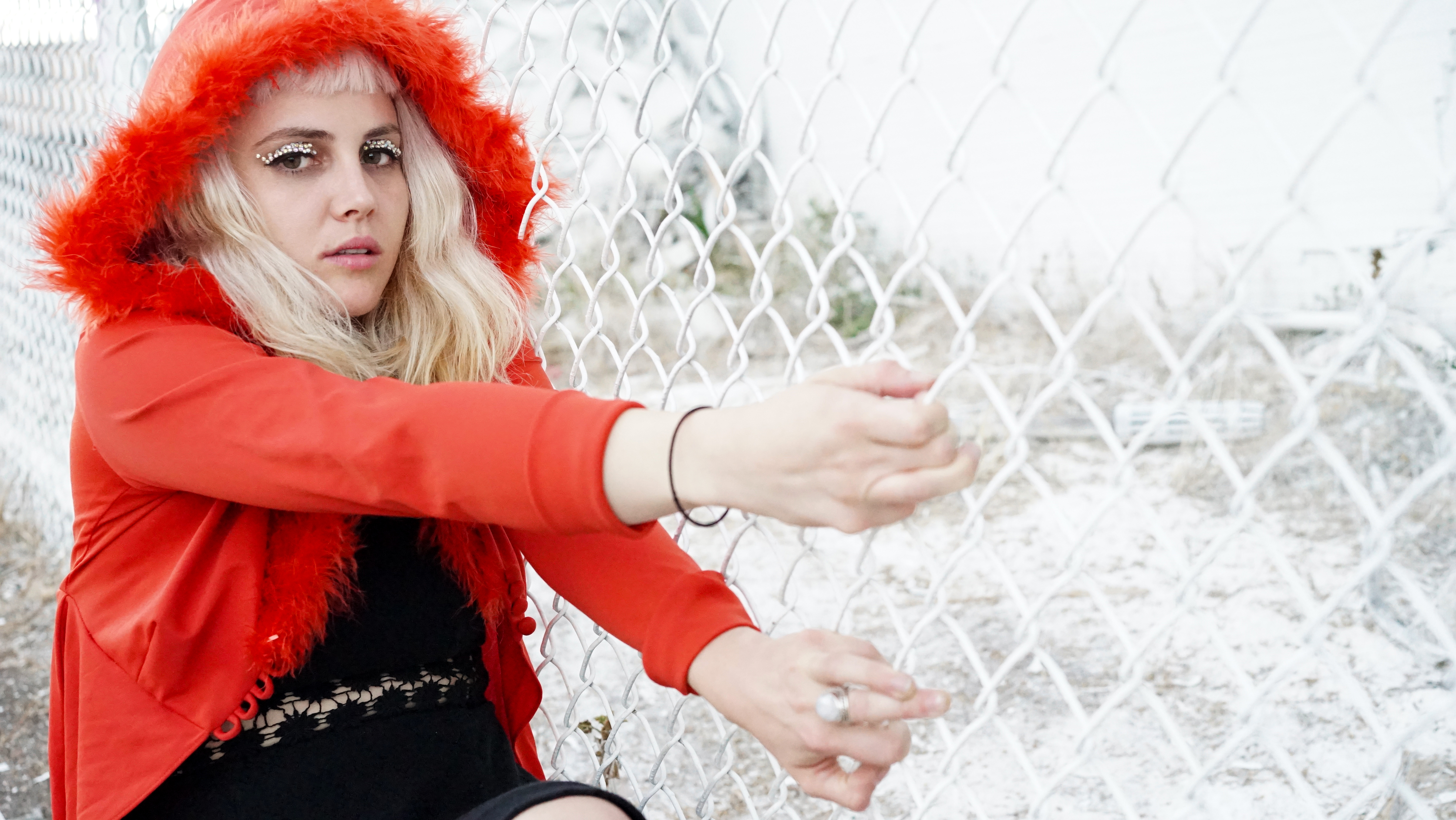
- le Fey in 2014
- Born: Elizabeth Gomez
- Occupations: Singer-songwriter; music producer
- Years active: 2010–present
- Musical career
- Origin: Mission Viejo, California, United States
- Genres: Indie folk; folk; psychedelic folk; neo-psychedelia
- Instruments: Vocals; guitar; keyboard
- Labels: Wichita Recordings; Nefarious Industries
- Formerly of: Meowtain

Elizabeth Gomez, known as Elizabeth Le Fey also known by the stage name Globelamp is an American singer-songwriter, musician, and producer from Mission Viejo, California.

== Career ==
Le Fey, who was born Elizabeth Gomez, started writing poetry at age 15, inspired by books like the Harry Potter series as well as myths and legends. She would start putting music to those poems years later, once she learned to play the guitar. Her earliest music influences include Syd Barrett, but as a young teen, she was inspired by the works of Conor Oberst, which led her to performing on her acoustic guitar at small coffee shops in Orange County, California. At age 15 she saw Le Tigre perform in Los Angeles, which made her love feminist rock.

In her early twenties, she moved to Olympia, Washington, to study at Evergreen State College. Shortly thereafter, she became an intern at K Records and formed the psych-punk band Meowtain. Elizabeth le Fey released her self-titled EP Globelamp, in 2011. She then took off to write, produce, and record her debut full length Star Dust, but prior to release, she began touring with the psych-rock band Foxygen in September 2012 after being asked to star in their music video "San Francisco"

=== Star Dust ===
Star Dust began as a lo-fi 8 track cassette recording experiment, recorded in many different houses across the United States. Le Fey first released Star Dust as an EP before re-releasing it as a full length, a year later on June 3, 2014 through Gazelle Recordings, holding six additional tracks.

Accompanying the release of Star Dust, Le Fey released a music video for the song "Breathing Ritual", June 2014.

=== Covers albums ===
In November 2014, le Fey produced and self released a covers album. A follow-up was released in 2018.

=== The Orange Glow ===
In May 2015 she opened for Laura Jane Grace in New York City at City Winery, and in Los Angeles at Hollywood Forever's Masonic Lodge.

In October, she released the freak-folk album The Orange Glow on cassette through Psychedelic Thriftstore Recordings, before being signed to Wichita Recordings and re-releasing it June 10, 2016.

Before the re-release of The Orange Glow, she premiered her music video for the opening track "Washington Moon" on February 18 of 2016. Followed by videos for her singles "Controversial/Confrontational" and "San Francisco" in April. "San Francisco" shares a name with a Foxygen song. The video was filmed at the Madonna Inn, which was the same location Foxygen's "San Francisco" was filmed, in which she appeared in during the summer of 2013. A few days before the release of the album, Le Fey put out the music video for her song "Artist/Traveler".

November 14, 2016 she premiered her music video for the album's title track "The Orange Glow".

=== Romantic Cancer ===
On October 12, 2018 she released her third album Romantic Cancer through Nefarious Industries. It features guest accordion by James Felice of The Felice Brothers and guest vocals and trombone by Morgan Y. Evans (Walking Bombs). It was recorded at Bohemesphere Studios, in the Catskill Mountains.

== Musical influences ==
Globelamp said that Conor Oberst inspired her to start writing songs, and that as a songwriter she is inspired by Elliott Smith, Fiona Apple, Syd Barrett, Taylor Swift, Tori Amos and Nick Drake.

== Discography ==
=== Albums ===
Year	Title	Label	Format
2014	Star Dust	Gazelle Recordings	CD, digital download, cassette
2014	Covers Album	Self-released	digital download
2015	The Orange Glow	Psychedelic Thriftstore Recordings, Wichita Recordings	CD, LP, digital download, cassette
2018	Romantic Cancer	Nefarious Industries	CD, digital download

=== Extended plays ===
Year	Title	label	Format
2011	Globelamp	self-released	CD, digital download

== Music videos ==
List of music videos, showing year released and director
Title	Year	Director(s)
"Breathing Ritual"	2014	Leslie Andrew Ridings
"Washington Moon"	2016	Paige Stark and Janell Shirtcliff
"Controversial/Confrontational"	2016	Elva Lexa
"San Francisco"	2016	Elva Lexa
"Artist / Traveler"	2016	Elva Lexa
"The Negative"	2016	Ivan Velazquez
"The Orange Glow"	2016	Angela Izzo
