= Mariachi El Bronx (2011 album) =

Studio album by The Bronx
- Released: August 2, 2011
- Recorded: December 2010–January 2011 at Brandos Paradise in San Gabriel, California
- Genre: Mariachi
- Length: 44:41
- Label: ATO
- Producer: John Avila; The Bronx

The Bronx chronology
Mariachi El Bronx (2009)	Mariachi El Bronx (2011)	The Bronx (2013)

Mariachi El Bronx is the fifth studio album by the Los Angeles rock band The Bronx, released August 2, 2011 through ATO Records. It is the band's second album under their alter egos "Mariachi El Bronx", in which they play mariachi music in place of their usual hardcore punk and hard rock styles.

== Reception ==
K. Ross Hoffman of AllMusic gave Mariachi El Bronx four and a half stars out of five, saying that "If there was any doubt that the gringo Angeleno hardcore punks in The Bronx were dead serious about their Mexican folk alter-ego ... the outfit's second album offers ironclad reassurance that this is no novelty act." He remarked that the album was a "significant improvement" over the band's 2009 mariachi album "in almost every respect: both the production and the performances are notably crisper and punchier; the arrangements are richer and more complex, full of swirling, soaring strings; the stylistic range is successfully broadened (to encompass cumbia, norteño, and bolero), and the passion and fire on display are simply undeniable. And the songs, in particular, are uniformly strong and memorable".

== Track listing ==
All tracks are written by Mariachi El Bronx

No.	Title	Length
1.	"48 Roses"	3:37
2.	"Great Provider"	2:55
3.	"Revolution Girls"	4:04
4.	"Fallen"	4:02
5.	"Norteño Lights"	3:36
6.	"Mariachi El Bronx" (featuring Mariachi Reyna de Los Angeles)	4:52
7.	"Map of the World"	3:09
8.	"Bodies of Christ"	3:19
9.	"Poverty's King"	3:52
10.	"Matador"	4:26
11.	"Everything Dies"	3:37
12.	"Spread Thin"	3:12
Total length:		44:41

== Personnel ==
The Bronx

- Matt Caughthran – vocals
- Joby J. Ford – vihuela, guitar, bajo sexto, accordion, jarana, recording engineer, album art
- Jorma Vik – drums, percussion
- Brad Magers – trumpet, backing vocals
- Ken Horne – jarana
- Vincent Hidalgo – guitarrón, requinto jarocho, guitar
- Ray Suen – violin, guitar, harp, requinto jarocho, vihuela, jarana, backing vocals

Additional musicians

- John Avila – charango, backing vocals
- Alfredo Ortiz – percussion
- Laura Peña – gritos, backing vocals
- Sasha Hernandez – gritos, backing vocals
- Linda Uhila – gritos, backing vocals

Production

- John Avila – producer, recording engineer
- Danny Avila – assistant recording engineer
- Beau Burchell – mixing engineer
- Gavin Lurssen – mastering
- Lisa Johnson – photographs

Artwork

- Joby J. Ford – artwork
- Lisa Johnson – photography

== Charts ==
Chart (2011)	Peak position
US Billboard 200	174
US Heatseekers Albums (Billboard)	4
US Independent Albums (Billboard)	29
US Top Rock Albums (Billboard)	50
