= The Holiday (album) =

Studio album by Futures
- Released: 3 March 2010 (Rock Sound); 19 April 2010 (Re-release)
- Genre: Rock, pop, pop-punk
- Length: 26:27 (Rock Sound); 33:19 (Re-release)
- Label: Self-released
- Producer: Peter Miles

Singles from The Holiday
- 1. "The Boy Who Cried Wolf" Released: 22 February 2010

The Holiday is the debut album from Buckinghamshire-based alternative band Futures, given away free with issue 133 (March 2010) of Rock Sound magazine.

This was the first time Rock Sound had given away a full album for free and led to this issue of the magazine becoming the highest selling in two years.

The album was re-released through the band's website on 19 April 2010, with bonus acoustic tracks.

== Track listing ==
All songs written by Futures.

1. "16" – 3:23
2. "Take Me Home" – 3:27
3. "Sal Paradise" – 3:27
4. "The Boy Who Cried Wolf" (featuring Annabel Jones of Lady and the Lost Boys) – 3:28
5. "Holiday" – 3:37
6. "The Summer" – 4:26
7. "Thank You" – 4:40

=== Re-release bonus tracks ===
8. "The Boy Who Cried Wolf (Acoustic)" – 3:12
9. "Holiday (Acoustic)" – 3:40

== Reception ==
Professional ratings
Review scores
| Source | Rating |
|---|---|
| Kerrang! | 4/5 stars |
| Rock Sound | 9/10 stars |
| Punktastic | 4/5 stars |
| Rocklifestyle | 4/5 stars |

The Holiday has been very well received, with the majority of reviews being positive. Kerrang! gave a positive review stating that it was "an album of gloriously uplifting tunes" and giving the album a KKKK rating.

Rock Sound's review was also very positive saying about the album, "it's gorgeous, it's rocking and it paints Futures as a very exciting prospect indeed". The album also gained a 9/10 rating.

The review on Punktastic stated that The Holiday "is going to set them apart from all of the more established acts doing this kind of thing. Kids in Glass Houses apart, I doubt there's a band doing this style of music any better" and that saying that "the future is very bright."

== Personnel ==
- Ant West – vocals, guitar
- Casey Roarty – guitar
- Christian Ward – bass
- George Lindsay – drums
- Annabel Jones – vocals on "The Boy Who Cried Wolf"
