= Cheatahs =

British shoegaze band

- Origin: London, England
- Genres: Shoegaze, noise rock
- Years active: 2009–2016
- Labels: Wichita Recordings
- Members: Dean Reid; James Wignall; Marc Raue; Nathan Hewitt
- Website: cheatahs.net

Cheatahs are a British shoegaze band formed in London, England in 2009.

== History ==
Three of the four members of Cheatahs hailed from different countries: vocalist Nathan Hewitt from Edmonton, Alberta, Canada; bassist Dean Reid from San Diego, California; and drummer Marc Raue from Dresden, Germany.

Hewitt and Wignall first met in 2006, recruiting friends Reid and Raue a few years later.

Their first release, the "Warrior" single, was issued in 2009, followed by the Coare and Sans EPs. The latter two were compiled as Extended Plays in 2013.

The band released their eponymous debut full-length album on Wichita Recordings in early 2014, supported by tours of the United States and Europe.

Their fourth EP, Sunne, was released on 23 February 2015. On 31 March 2015 they announced its follow-up, 紫 (Murasaki), inspired by Japanese novelist Murasaki Shikibu, and in particular, her novel The Tale of Genji.

On 18 August 2015, Cheatahs previewed new song "Seven Sisters" and announced that their second full-length album, Mythologies, would be released on 30 October by Wichita.

== Discography ==
=== Studio albums ===
- Cheatahs (2014, Wichita Recordings)
- Mythologies (2015, Wichita Recordings)

=== Compilation albums ===
- Extended Plays (2013, Wichita Recordings)

=== Singles and EPs ===
- "Warrior" single (2009, Young and Lost Club)
- Coared EP (2012, Marshall Teller Records)
- Sans EP (2012, Wichita Recordings)
- "Cut the Grass" single (2013, Wichita Recordings)
- "Get Tight" single (2014, Wichita Recordings)
- Sunne EP (2015, Wichita Recordings)
- Sunne E.P. Remixes EP (2015, Wichita Recordings)
- 紫 (Murasaki) EP (2015, Wichita Recordings)

== Members ==
- Nathan Hewitt – vocals, guitar
- James Wignall – vocals, guitar, tapes, keyboards
- Dean Reid – bass, vocals, keyboards
- Marc Raue – drums, tapes, keyboards
