= Ray Suen =

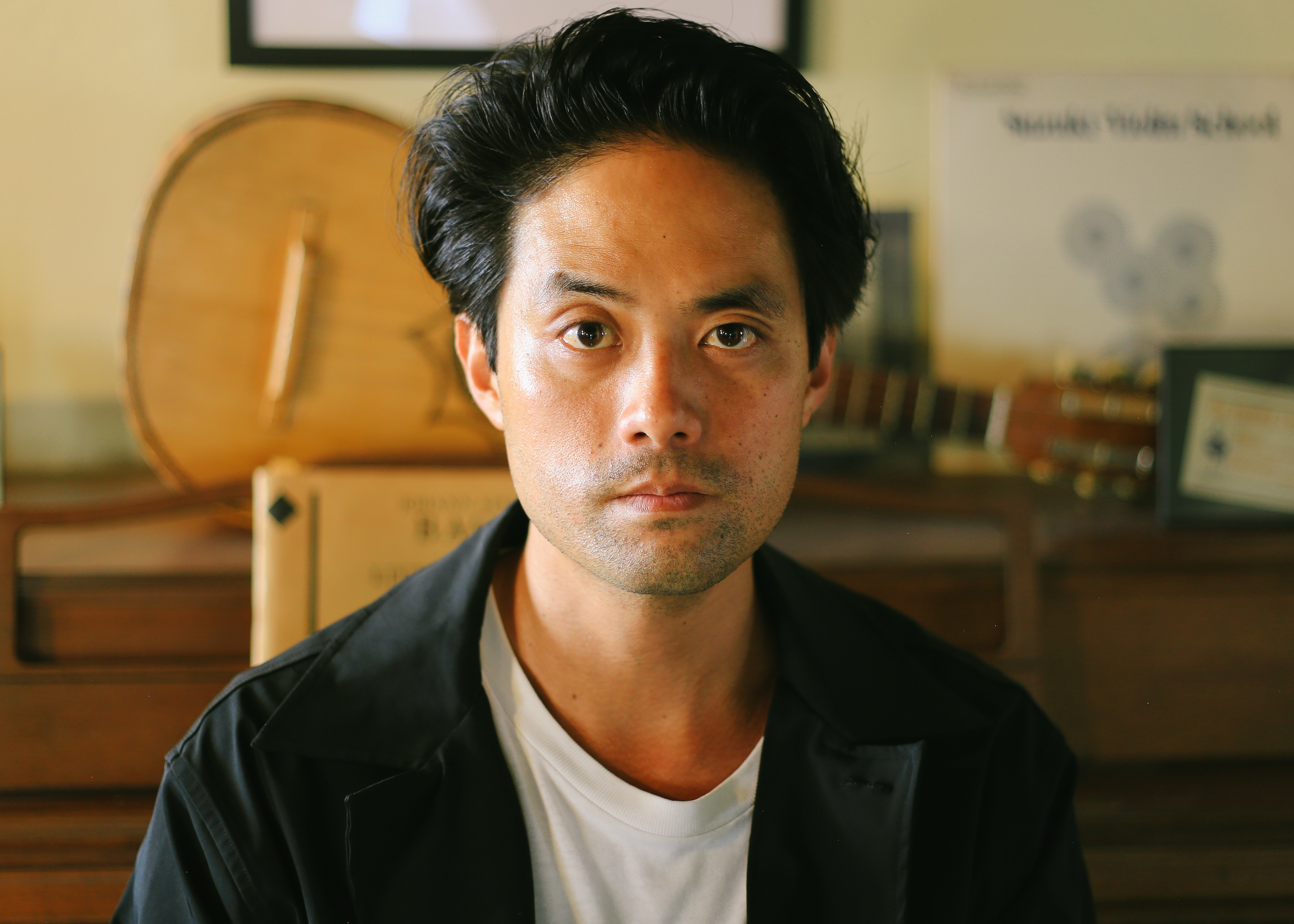

Background information
- Born: Raymond Liang Suen; July 5, 1985 (age 41); Newark, Delaware, United States
- Occupations: Musician; composer
- Instruments: Violin; guitar; keyboards; vocals
- Website: www.raysuen.com

Raymond Liang Suen (born July 5, 1985) is an American musician and composer based in Los Angeles, California, best known for his work with Childish Gambino, Lorde and David Byrne.

He composed and produced his first film score for Elliott Lester's The Thicket (film), released September 6, 2024. The score was released as a soundtrack album on September 13, 2024 on Lakeshore Records.

== Career ==
Born in Newark, Delaware and raised in San Diego, California and classically trained, Suen began playing violin at the age of three. He served as a principal violinist with the La Jolla Symphony Orchestra and also studied jazz while earning a degree in psychology at UCSD. He became a fixture in the San Diego music scene performing with rock, folk, jazz, and world music groups as well as recording with such artists as Jason Mraz, Matt Curreri & the Exfriends, Joanie Mendenhall, and Gregory Page among others. He would also occasionally feature with the Joe Firstman house band on Last Call with Carson Daly.

Upon graduation in 2007, he began his first national tour playing violin and keys with San Diego glam-rock band, Louis XIV opening for the Las Vegas rock band, The Killers on the last leg of their Sam's Town Tour. Suen would later join The Killers in 2008 as keyboardist, guitarist, violinist, and backing vocalist for their Day & Age World Tour and appears on The Killers' live concert DVD, Live from the Royal Albert Hall.

Suen met members of Mariachi El Bronx when they opened for the Killers and began touring with them following the end of the Day & Age Tour. He would later become a member, writing songs and playing vihuela, jarana, harp, guitar, violin, and vocals for albums "II" and "III". Suen left the band in 2014.

Other artists Suen has performed with include Devon Sproule, The Flaming Lips and Childish Gambino. Suen played with Sproule during a short tour in February 2009 and played percussion with The Flaming Lips on The Tonight Show with Conan O'Brien in October 2009. Suen appeared again with The Flaming Lips at the 2011 New Year's Eve Freakout playing harp, guitar, synth and other percussion for the first live performance of The Soft Bulletin album. He performed subsequent Soft Bulletin shows as well as Dark Side of the Moon shows as an auxiliary musician.

Suen joined Childish Gambino during the I Am Donald tour playing guitar, keyboard, and violin. He resumed playing with Childish Gambino for the Camp, Because the Internet and This is America tours. He also contributed to the "Awaken, My Love!" album released December 2016.

In 2015, Suen was a touring member of Passion Pit in support of their third album, Kindred. In 2016, he toured with Australian R&B artist Jarryd James playing keyboards in support of his first American album, "High."

Suen has released 2 EPs as his solo project, Savio Savio.

In 2017, Suen began working as musical director for Lorde in support of her sophomore release, Melodrama, playing keys and guitar as well as arranging band, vocals, strings and horns. He was also music director for Lorde's Solar Power tour (2021–2023).

In 2024, Suen joined the touring line-up of the American indie rock band Vampire Weekend, playing the guitar, keyboards, violin, and pedal steel, as well as singing backing vocals.

He was the musical director for David Byrne's "Who Is The Sky?" Tour from 2025-2026, performing as a guitarist, violinist, bassist, accordionist and backing vocalist.

== Selected discography ==
- Mariachi El Bronx - "IV" (2026)
- The Thicket - Original Motion Picture Soundtrack (2024)
- Georgia Gets By – Fish Bird Baby Boy (2023) – Strings, Pedal Steel Guitar
- Lorde – Solar Power (album) (2021) – Vocal Arrangement
- Adam Melchor – Lullaby Hotline Vol. I (2021) – pedal steel guitar
- Bill & Ted Face the Music (2020) – additional music
- Trolls World Tour – Original Motion Picture Soundtrack (2020) – guitar
- Khalid – Free Spirit (Khalid album) (2019) – guitar
- Kamasi Washington – Heaven and Earth (2018) – violin
- Jaws of Love – Tasha Sits Close to the Piano (2017) – strings, engineer
- Clinical – Soundtrack (2017) – strings
- Miles Mosley – Uprising (2017) – violin
- Childish Gambino – "Awaken, My Love!" (2016) – guitar, keys, additional production.
- My Blind Brother – Soundtrack (2016) – violin, viola
- Burning Bodhi – Soundtrack (2015) – whistling, violin, string arrangement
- Carl Barât & The Jackals – "Let It Reign" (2015) – bass, strings
- Mariachi El Bronx- "III" (2014) – violin, vihuela, guitar, vocals
- Willis Earl Beal – "Nobody Knows" (2013) – violin
- The Enemy – "Streets in the Sky" – violin
- Madness (band) – "Oui Oui Si Si Ja Ja Da Da" (2012) – violins, vocals
- Mariachi El Bronx – Mariachi El Bronx (II) (2011) – Vihuela, Jarana, vocals (background), harp, guitar, violin
- White Sea – This Frontier EP (2010) – strings, guitar
- Transfer – Future Selves (2011) – strings
- Armistice – Armistice EP (2011) – strings, guitar
- The Killers – Live from the Royal Albert Hall (2009) – guitar, keyboards, violin, backing vocals credited as Ray L. Suen
- Louis XIV – Slick Dogs and Ponies (2007) – strings credited as Mister Raymond Suen

== External links and references ==
- Official Ray Suen site
- SAVIO SAVIO site
