= Bats! =

2003 single by The Bronx

Single by The Bronx
- A-side: "Bats!"
- B-side: "You Want to See Us Burn"; "Private Affair"
- Released: July 15, 2003
- Recorded: March 2003 at the home of Beau Burchell in Los Angeles
- Genre: Punk rock
- Length: 7:18
- Label: Tarantulas (TAR 004)
- Songwriter(s): The Bronx
- Producer(s): Beau Burchell

The Bronx singles chronology
"Bats!" (2003)	"They Will Kill Us All (Without Mercy)" (2004)

"Bats!" is the debut single by Los Angeles–based punk rock band The Bronx, released in 2003 by Tarantulas Records. It was produced by Beau Burchell and recorded at his home in Los Angeles. The single was released on both compact disc and 12-inch vinyl, the latter a picture disc limited to 1,000 copies. The B-side is backmasked, playing from the inner edge to the outer.

== Track listing ==
=== CD version ===
No.	Title	Writer(s)	Length
1.	"Bats!"	The Bronx	2:26
2.	"You Want to See Us Burn"	The Bronx	2:47
3.	"Private Affair" (originally performed by The Saints)	Ed Kuepper, Chris Bailey	2:05
Total length:			7:18

=== Vinyl version ===
Side A
No.	Title	Writer(s)	Length
1.	"Bats!"	The Bronx	2:26

Side B
No.	Title	Writer(s)	Length
1.	"You Want to See Us Burn"	The Bronx	2:47
2.	"Private Affair" (originally performed by The Saints)	Ed Kuepper, Chris Bailey	2:05
Total length:			7:18

== Personnel ==
=== Band ===
- Matt Caughthran – lead vocals
- Joby J. Ford – guitar, backing vocals, graphic design
- James Tweedy – bass guitar, backing vocals
- Jorma Vik – drums

=== Production ===
- Beau Burchell – producer, recording
- Don C. Tyler – mastering

== See also ==
- The Bronx discography
