= Those Dancing Days =

Swedish indie pop band

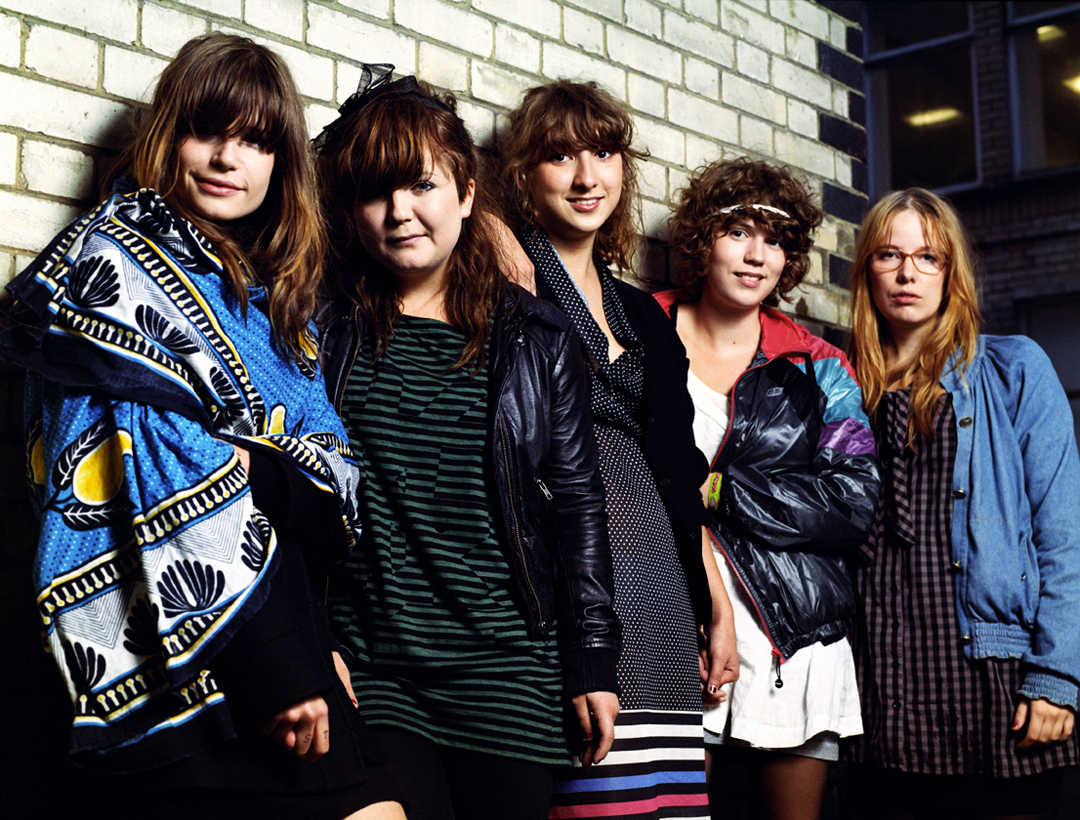
- Pictured in July 2009

Background information
- Origin: Stockholm, Sweden
- Genres: Indie pop, twee pop
- Years active: 2005–2011 (hiatus)
- Labels: Wichita Recordings
- Members: Linnea Jönsson: Vocals; Lisa Pyk: Hammond organ Rebecka Rolfart: Electric guitar Mimmi Evrell: Bass guitar Cissi Efraimsson: Drums

Those Dancing Days were an indie pop band from Nacka, a suburb of Stockholm, Sweden. Most frequently compared to Northern Soul and 1960s era girl-groups, the band formed in 2005 while the members were all still in school. They were signed to Wichita Recordings. The band consisted of five people from Stockholm. Their name derived from the Led Zeppelin song "Dancing Days" pitched by the band's bassist, Mimmi.

== History ==
Two of the band members completed school as late as summer 2008, and they received a lot of publicity during 2007, including being featured in NME and on MTV2. They were also nominated for the Best Swedish Act prize at the MTV Europe Music Awards 2007. The band has played many gigs in their native Sweden as well as in the United Kingdom and Germany.

They released a 5-track EP in Sweden before being signed by UK label Wichita Recordings, who released a self-titled single in October 2007 (described as "Blondie backed by The Attractions", and "The Slits rehearsing with Bow Wow Wow whilst breaking in a new drummer"), with a second single, "Hitten". Their debut full-length album In Our Space Hero Suits was released on 6 October 2008, preceded by a single Home Sweet Home on 29 September.

The band was chosen personally by Belle & Sebastian to perform at their second Bowlie Weekender festival presented by All Tomorrow's Parties in the UK in December 2010. A second album, Daydreams & Nightmares was released in 2011. The band made a number of festival appearances in the summer including Glastonbury finishing with Popaganda in Stockholm on 27 August. Four days after this performance, the band announced on their website that the group would be 'put to bed for a while'. The same announcement revealed the final release will be the single "Help Me Close My Eyes". Some band members founded Vulkano in late 2011.

== Discography ==
=== Albums ===
- In Our Space Hero Suits (2008) – UK No. 180
- Daydreams & Nightmares (2011) – SWE No. 58

=== EPs ===
- Those Dancing Days (2007)

=== Singles ===
- "Those Dancing Days" (2007) - SWE No. 17
- "Hitten" (2008)
- "Run Run" (2008)
- "Home Sweet Home" (2008)
- "Fuckarias" (2010)
- "Reaching Forward" (2011)
- "I'll Be Yours" (2011)
- "Can't Find Entrance" (2011)
- "Help Me Close My Eyes" (2011)
