= Choir of Echoes =

Studio album by Peggy Sue
- Released: 27 January 2014
- Genre: Rock
- Length: 46:27
- Label: Yep Roc

Peggy Sue chronology
| Acrobats (2011) | Choir of Echoes (2014) |

Professional ratings
Aggregate scores
| Source | Rating |
|---|---|
| Metacritic | 76/100 |
Review scores
| Source | Rating |
| AllMusic | 3.5/5 stars |

Choir of Echoes is the third studio album by British band Peggy Sue. It was released in January 2014 under Yep Roc Records.

== Track list ==
| No. | Title | Length |
|---|---|---|
| 1. | "(Come Back Around)" | 1:30 |
| 2. | "Esme" | 3:26 |
| 3. | "Substitute" | 3:34 |
| 4. | "Figure of Eight" | 4:03 |
| 5. | "Always Going" | 4:38 |
| 6. | "Just the Night" | 3:34 |
| 7. | "How Heavy the Quiet That Grew Between Your Mouth and Mine" | 1:57 |
| 8. | "Electric Light" | 4:16 |
| 9. | "Longest Day of the Year Blues" | 3:09 |
| 10. | "Idle" | 4:42 |
| 11. | "And Always Is" | 3:36 |
| 12. | "Two Shots" | 4:11 |
| 13. | "The Errors of Your Ways" | 3:51 |
