= Mothers (band) =

American band

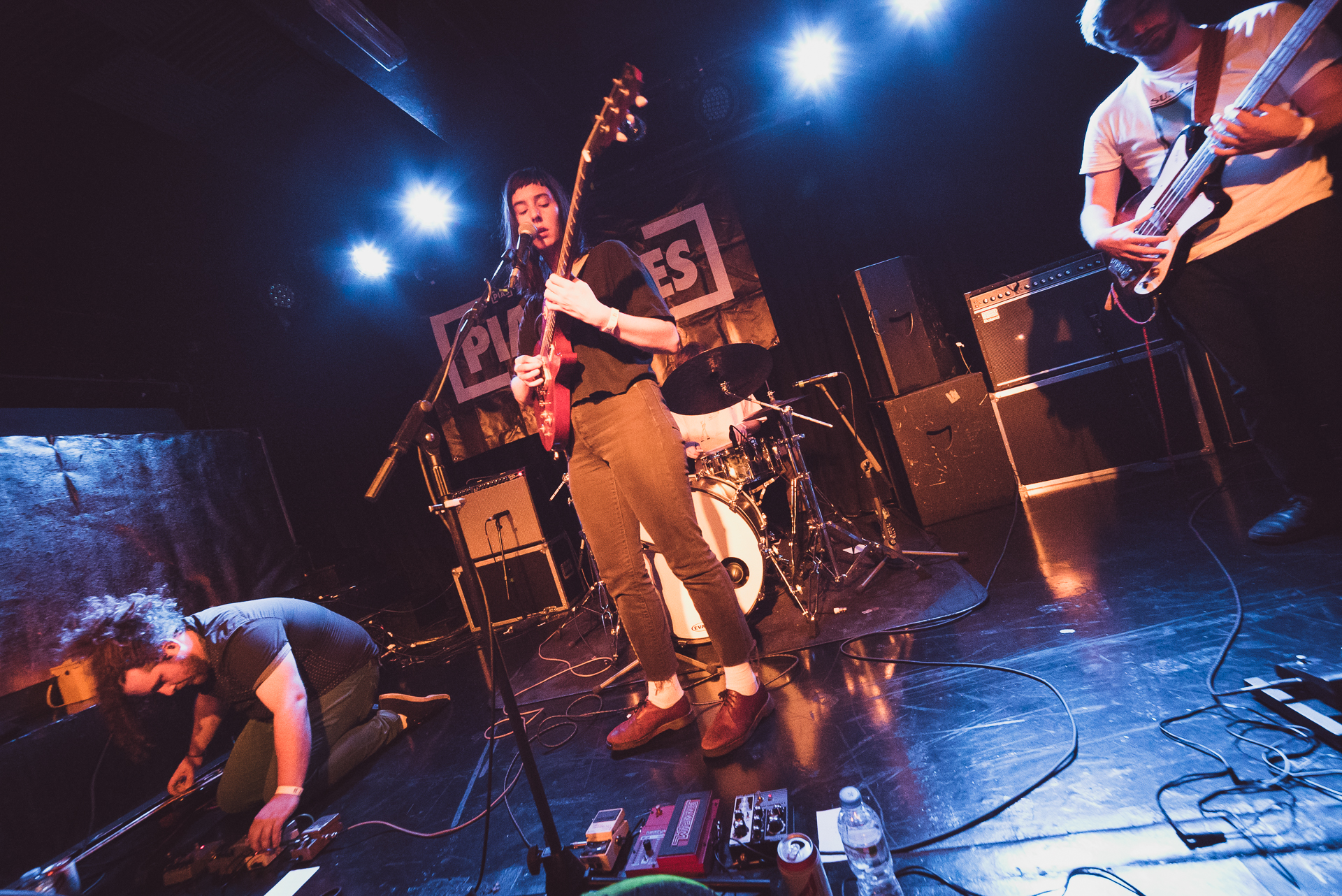

Background information
- Origin: Athens, Georgia
- Genres: Folk, experimental, indie rock
- Years active: 2013–2018
- Labels: Grand Jury Records; Wichita Recordings; Anti-
- Past members: Kristine Leschper; Matthew Anderegg; Garrett Burke; Chris Taylor
- Website: mothersband.us

Mothers was an American band from Athens, Georgia, United States, composed of Kristine Leschper, Matthew Anderegg, Chris Taylor, and Garrett Burke. They released their debut album When You Walk a Long Distance You Are Tired, on February 26, 2016. Their sophomore album, Render Another Ugly Method, released September 7, 2018.

== History ==
Mothers originally formed in 2013 as the solo project of musician Kristine Leschper. Leschper started making music while she was a student studying printmaking at the Lamar Dodd School of Art. Over the next year, Leschper began to garner a following alongside acclaim in the Georgia music scene. After garnering this attention, Leschper decided to recruit other musicians from Athens to form a full band. In November 2015, Mothers announced plans to release their debut album, When You Walk a Long Distance You Are Tired, on February 26, 2016. The album was released on Grand Jury Records in America and Wichita Recordings in England.

On June 20, 2018, Mothers announced the follow-up LP to their debut, titled Render Another Ugly Method, due to be released on September 7, 2018 on ANTI- Records. An accompanying tour throughout North America was announced in conjunction.

The band was dissolved in 2018 following the recording of Render Another Ugly Method. This came amid a worsening depression for Leschper, stemming from the stress of touring and recording and later the COVID-19 pandemic. Leschper released her first solo album after departing Mothers, The Opening, or Closing of a Door, in March 2022.

== Band members ==
- Kristine Leschper - guitar, vocals
- Matthew Anderegg - drums, guitar
- Chris Goggins - bass
- Garrett Burke - drums (2017- )

Former Members -

- Mckendrick Bearden - Guitar, Bass, String Arrangements
- Patrick Morales - Bass
- Drew Kirby - guitar (2014-2017)

== Discography ==
=== Studio albums ===
- When You Walk a Long Distance You Are Tired (2016, Grand Jury Records + Wichita Recordings)
- Render Another Ugly Method (Anti-, 2018)
