= Kristine Leschper =

American musician

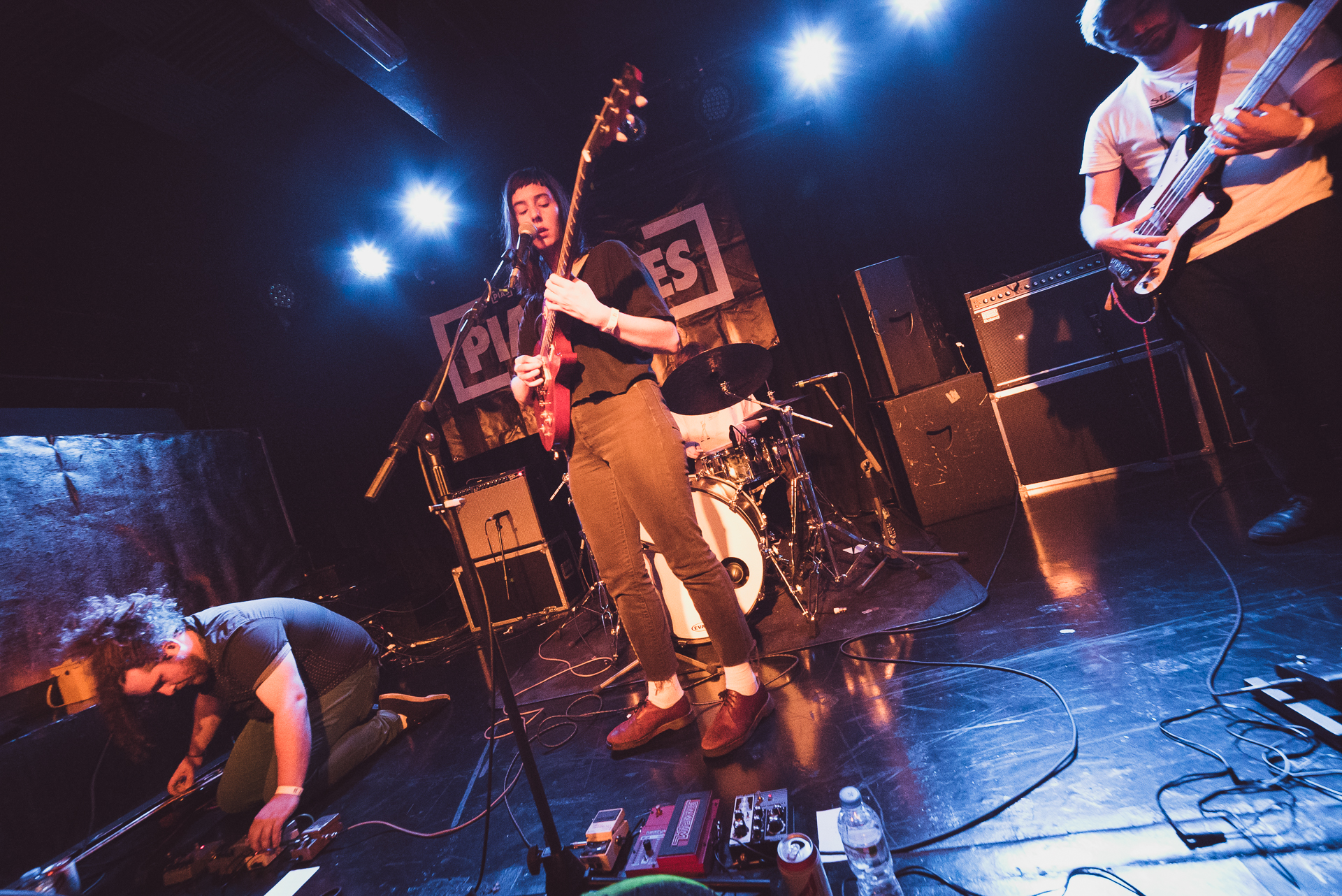
- Leschper with Mothers in 2016

Background information
- Born: Athens, Georgia, U.S
- Genres: Folk; experimental; indie rock
- Occupations: Musician; songwriter
- Instruments: Vocals; guitar
- Years active: 2010s–present
- Label: Anti-
- Formerly of: Mothers

Kristine Leschper is an American musician from Athens, Georgia, now based in Philadelphia, Pennsylvania. She is best known as the former frontwoman of Mothers.

== Career ==
Leschper began her career writing solo music under the moniker "Mothers" in the early 2010s. However, the project soon turned into a full band, and they released two albums as a group before breaking up. Leschper moved from Athens, Georgia, to Philadelphia in 2018. She said that anxiety and depression ensued after the last Mothers album and tour. During the COVID-19 pandemic, Leschper decided to return to her early days as a solo musician and begin working on new material. In late 2021, Leschper emerged with the announcement of her first solo album, The Opening, or Closing of a Door. When discussing why Leschper decided to become a solo artist, she said:

Earlier work didn't involve recording as part of the writing process, recordings were simply made as a document of something that had been written and rehearsed. I have since discovered a deep affection for home recording and sound exploration, finding that I thrive in those rabbit holes of texture, timbre, rhythm, which can add so much complexity to the emotionality of a composition.

The album was released on March 4, 2022, through Anti-, and received positive reviews.
