= Peggy Sue (band) =

English indie band

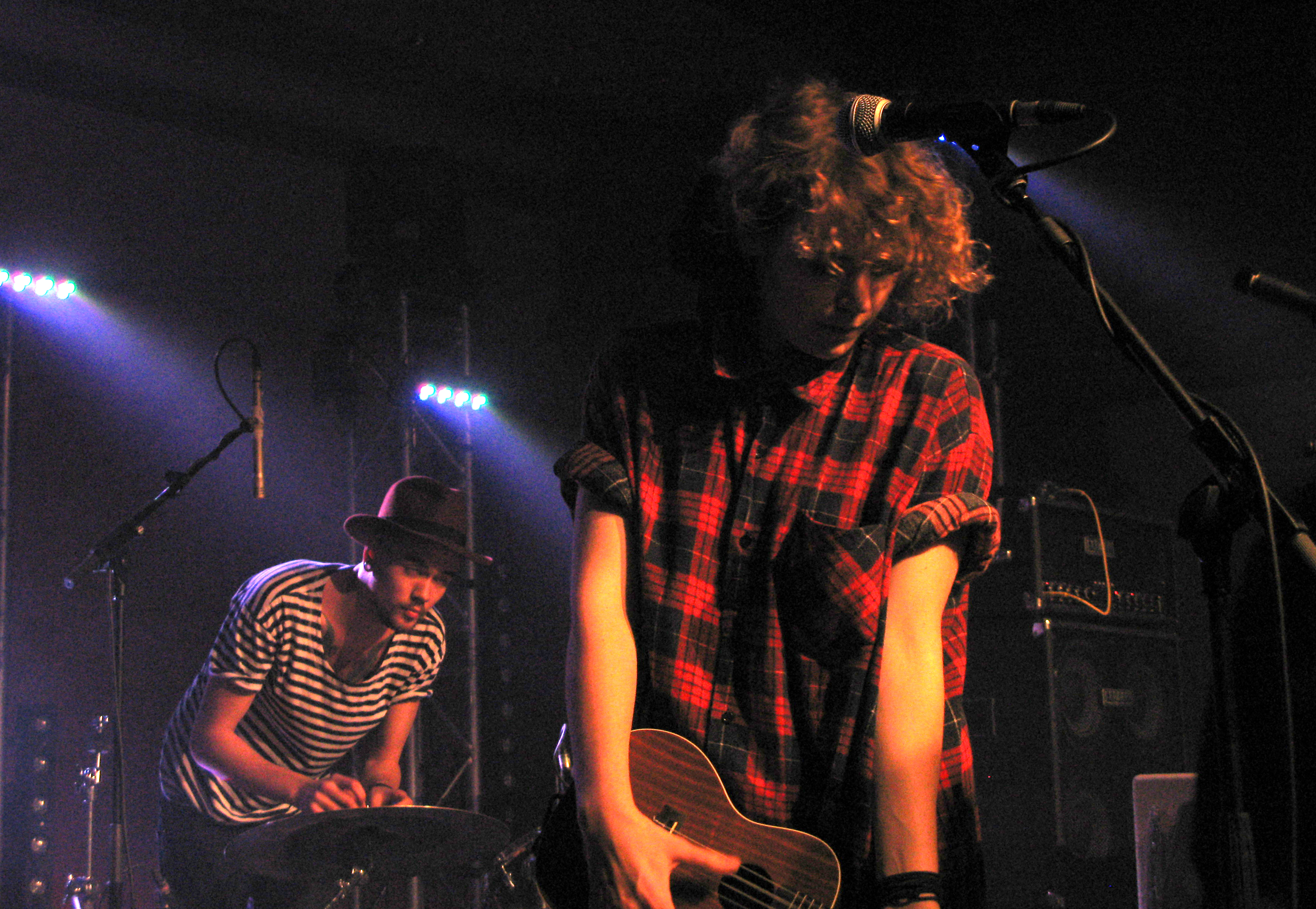
- Peggy Sue in Amiens (October 2010)

Background information
- Origin: Brighton, England
- Genres: Indie folk, blues,
- Years active: 2007–present
- Labels: Wichita Recordings (UK); Yep Roc Records (US)
- Members: Clay Slade, Katy Young
- Website: peggywho.com

Peggy Sue are an English indie pop/indie folk band from Brighton. The band have toured with a number of well-known indie artists including Mumford & Sons, The Maccabees, First Aid Kit, Kate Nash, and Jack White.

== History ==
Peggy Sue were formerly known as Peggy Sue and the Pirates and Peggy Sue and the Pictures. In June 2008, the band announced that they were shortening their name from Peggy Sue and the Pirates to just Peggy Sue. The band have also released music under the name of Peggy Sue and the Pictures, a collaboration with Left with Pictures, and Peggy Sue and Les Triplettes.

On 10 April 2009, it was announced that Peggy Sue had signed to US-based Yep Roc Records, and the label was releasing Body Parts EP for free.

On 9 December 2009, Peggy Sue signed with Wichita Recordings, and the label released the band's debut album Fossils and Other Phantoms in April 2010.

On 12 September 2011, the second album Acrobats came out on Wichita Recordings, to a generally positive critical response.

In 2011, the band were invited to perform a live soundtrack to a film at a temporary cinema in Hackney, East London. They chose Kenneth Anger's 1963 cult classic Scorpio Rising, mostly because of its groundbreaking rock n' roll/doo wop soundtrack. The band's subsequent album "Peggy Sue Play the Songs of Scorpio Rising" was released 18 September 2012 via Yep Roc Records and features 12 new arrangements of songs from the film.

Yep Roc Records announced a new full-length album Choir of Echoes to be released in the US 29 January 2014. Choir of Echoes was produced at the legendary Rockfield Studio in South Wales by Jimmy Robertson and mixed by longtime collaborator John Askew. Of the record, the band say "Choir of Echoes is an album about singing. About losing your voice and finding it again. Voices keeping each other company and voices competing for space. The call and response of the kindest and the cruelest words. Choruses. Duets. Whispers and shouts.".

== Discography ==
=== Studio albums ===
- Fossils and Other Phantoms (Wichita, Yep Roc) April 2010
- Acrobats (Wichita, Yep Roc) September 2011
- Peggy Sue Play the Songs of Scorpio Rising (ep), September 2012
- Choir of Echoes, January 2014
- Vices, February 2020

=== Extended plays ===
"The Body Parts EP" was released on Monday 4 August 2008 on a limited run of 500. It was released via the label Broken Sounds, who gave away a reel to reel recorder as part of the release. The Body Parts EP was recorded with Left With Pictures, hence the name change to "Peggy Sue & The Pictures", and was available as a 2 x 7" Gatefold EP. It was also digitally distributed through iTunes.

- A1 "Spare Parts"
- B1 "Pupils Blink"
- C1 "Gettysburg"
- D1 "Escargot"

"The First Aid EP" is the second in a collection released via Broken Sounds Music. As before, it was released as a limited run of 500 as a 2 x 7" Gatefold EP, and digitally on iTunes. Unlike The Body Parts EP, it was not recorded with Left With Pictures, but with an unknown band. The name on the front of the EP is Peggy Sue & Les Triplettes.

- A1 "First Aid" / "Once We Were Strangers"
- B1 "Clockwork"
- C1 "Eisenstein"
- D1 "The Sea The Sea"

=== Singles ===
- "Television" / "The New Song" (Thesaurus Records) November 2007
- "Alice in the Kitchen" / "Lazarus" (Too Pure Singles Club) February 2009
- "Lover Gone" (Thesaurus Records) June 2009

=== Monthly CDs ===
The band also released 100 copies of a CD of around four songs every month in 2008. The monthly CDs were available from their Myspace page.
