= The Dragons (band) =

American rock band (1991–2005)

- Origin: San Diego, California, United States
- Genres: Rock & roll, punk rock
- Years active: 1991–2005
- Labels: Imposible; Poptone; Scam-O-Rama; Junk; Gearhead
- Past members: Mario Escovedo; Steve Rodriguez; Ken Horne; Jarrod Lucas

The Dragons were a rock band based in San Diego, California, that released seven albums between 1991 and 2005. The band was notably fronted by singer/guitarist Mario Escovedo, whose musical family also includes Alejandro Escovedo, Pete Escovedo, Javier Escovedo (The Zeros), Coke Escovedo, Paris Escovedo (the son of Coke Escovedo) and Sheila E. Other members of The Dragons included Ken Horne (lead guitar), Steve Rodriguez (bass guitar) and Jarrod Lucas (drums).

The band played a combination of glam, garage and punk rock, similar to New York Dolls and Hanoi Rocks.

Before starting The Dragons, both Escovedo and Rodriguez had played together in a local San Diego band called M-80. The Dragons formed in 1991 and later that year performed at the first of their 11 appearances at South by Southwest. The band released an eponymous vinyl album in 1992 for the Spanish label Imposible Records.

A year later they followed with a single for Poptone Records that brought them a lot of local radio exposure. In 1996, The Dragons recorded "Painkiller" for Scam-O-Rama records. Two years later in The Dragons signed a deal with Junk Records and released "Cheers to Me", "R.L.F." and "Kamikaze" in three consecutive years. The band followed that with a Japanese-only release "The Dragons." In 2003, The Dragons signed with Gearhead Records and released "Sin Salvation." Over the years, the band toured nationally both on the club circuit and as opening act for major bands. The band also filmed a music video for the song "Red Fox Room" directed by Mark Habegger.

After 13 years and seven albums, the band announced it was parting ways in November 2005. Guitarist Horne moved back to his native Japan, and in 2008 joined The Bronx. The Dragons have since reformed with guest lead guitarists for a few one-off shows from time to time.

Escovedo has since formed a new band called the Mario Escovedo Xperience (MEX for short) that plays music more akin to Los Lobos and the Texas Tornados than the hard rock of The Dragons. Bass guitarist Steve Rodriguez died on July 21, 2015, aged 48.

== Discography ==
Albums

- 1992 - The Dragons (Imposible Records)
- 1996 - Pain Killer (Scam-O-Rama Records)
- 1998 - Cheers to Me (Junk Records)
- 1999 - Rock Like Fuck (Junk Records)
- 2000 - Live at the Casbah (Junk Records)
- 2003 - Sin Salvation (Gearhead Records)
- 2004 - Rock n Roll Kamikaze (Gearhead Records)

Singles

- 2000 - "Woah Yeah!" b/w "Wasted Days and Wasted Nights" (Gearhead Records)
- 2004 - "Dirty Bomb" b/w "Save A Smile" (Gearhead Records)

Compilations

- 1996 - "Red Fox Room" - Keep The Beat (Hairball 8)
- 1998 - "Ted" - All Punk Rods! (A Devil's Dozen Of Deluxe Drag Punk!) (Lookout Records)
- 2000 - "C'mon!", "Long Way To Go" - Welcome To Gearhead Country (Gearhead Records)
