= The Bronx (2013 album) =

IV

Studio album by The Bronx
- Released: February 5, 2013
- Length: 36:49
- Label: ATO; White Drugs
- Producer: Beau Burchell

The Bronx chronology
Mariachi El Bronx (2011)	IV (2013)	Mariachi El Bronx (2014)

Professional ratings
Review scores
Source	Rating
AllMusic	3.5/5 stars
The A.V. Club	B+
BBC	(favourable)
Consequence of Sound	3/5 stars
DIY	8/10
Drowned in Sound	7/10
PopMatters	8/10 stars
Prefix Magazine	6.5/10
Punknews.org	4/5 stars
The Skinny	3/5 stars
Tone Deaf	6.5/10

IV is the fourth studio album by punk rock band The Bronx. It was released on February 5, 2013.

== Track listing ==
No.	Title	Length
1.	"The Unholy Hand"	2:36
2.	"Along for the Ride"	2:50
3.	"Style Over Everything"	3:43
4.	"Youth Wasted"	2:55
5.	"Too Many Devils"	2:39
6.	"Pilot Light"	2:59
7.	"Torches"	3:07
8.	"Under The Rabbit"	2:48
9.	"Ribcage"	2:59
10.	"Valley Heat"	2:55
11.	"Life Less Ordinary"	4:09
12.	"Last Revelation"	3:09

== Personnel ==
- Matt Caughthran – vocals
- Joby J. Ford – guitar
- Ken Horne – guitar
- Brad Magers – bass
- Jorma Vik – drums

== Charts ==
Chart (2013)	Peak position
Australian Albums (ARIA)	37
Belgian Albums (Ultratop Flanders)	124
UK Albums (OCC)	138
UK Independent Albums (OCC)	19
UK Rock & Metal Albums (OCC)	14
US Billboard 200	173
US Heatseekers Albums (Billboard)	3
US Independent Albums (Billboard)	27
US Top Rock Albums (Billboard)	50
