= Bronx, Wyoming =

Community in Wyoming, USA

Coordinates: 42°59′34″N 110°06′57″W

Bronx was a small community in Sublette County, Wyoming, United States. It was located on the east side of the Green River near the original Warren Bridge (named for local Missouri-born rancher J.J. Warren). Settled in the early 1900s, a post office was established in 1906, on the Pape Ranch. A community hall was constructed one-half mile to the east of the bridge, and foundations still remain. Many Bronx settlers came from Kansas. A store was opened here by C.Y Phillips; later R.T. Albert and Sons ran it.

On the west side of the Green the Beaver School was built. Eventually it was moved near Cora. The Bronx School was located on the east side of the river; both were part of Sublette County School District Number 6. The schools were closed circa 1948, but no transportation was provided to Pinedale, so they reopened in 1953, finally becoming defunct in 1964–65.

The area is now occupied by ranches of various sizes; the Bronx Community Club still includes women from hereabouts, as well as from Pinedale and Cora.

== Statistics ==
- Coordinates: 42.9927180 N; 110.1157198 W
- Elevation: 7176 feet
- Zip Code 83115 (Daniel, Wyoming)
