= Bullet Treatment =

- Origin: Los Angeles, California, U.S.
- Genres: Hardcore punk
- Years active: 1998–present
- Labels: Basement, Think Fast!, Fat Wreck Chords
- Members: Chuck Dietrich
- Website: www.facebook.com/BulletTreatment

Bullet Treatment is an American hardcore punk band based out of Los Angeles, California, United States.

== Career ==
Most of their albums are released on Basement Records. They also have released music on Fat Wreck Chords and Think Fast! Records. Started by guitarist Chuck Dietrich, the band has featured over 30 members over its long history including Tim McIlrath of Rise Against, Matt Caughthran of The Bronx, and Dave Hildago Jr. from Social Distortion. Bullet Treatment songs "Grindstone", "Spread My Legs", "A Reason For Violence", "Hand In Hand", "Pointless Conversation", and "Not Afraid Of The World" have been featured on MTV's television show Nitro Circus.

== Reception ==
The song "The Escapist" from the EP "Ex-Breathers" was featured in Season 3 Episode 11 of the MTV show, Ridiculousness.

Punknews.org described Bullet Treatment as "Take the reckless intensity of Black Flag, the breakneck speed of Minor Threat and the brilliant musical structures of early Adolescents. Now throw it all in a pot, set that shit on fire and let it explode in a blaze of glory. Your end result would be The Mistake by a little-known band called Bullet Treatment."

== Discography ==
“Split w/ Riotgun” (2002, Basement Records)
“Furious World” (2003, Basement Records)
"What More Do You Want" (2004, Basement Records)
“Split w/ Shellshock” (2004, Puke N’ Vomit)
“Split w/ The Nipples” (2004, Basement Records)
“The Bigger, The Better” (2005, Basement Records)
“Dead Are Walking” (2006, Basement Records)
"The Mistake" (2006, Basement / Think Fast Records)
“Split w/ It’s Casual” (2008, Basement Records)
"Designated - Vol.1" (2009, Fat Wreck Chords)
“What Else Could You Want?” (2009, Basement Records)
“Designated - Vol. 2” (2012, Think Fast Records)
“Ex-Breathers” (2013, Basement Records)
“What More Do You Want? (Re-Issue)” (2014, Basement Records)
“Retrospective” (2015, Basement Records)
“Bloodshot Chapter 1” (2016, Basement Records)
