= The Bronx (2006 album) =

Studio album by The Bronx
- Released: July 4, 2006
- Genres: Hardcore punk, hard rock
- Length: 33:43
- Labels: Island Def Jam, White Drugs, Swami
- Producers: Michael Beinhorn and Gilby Clarke

The Bronx chronology
La Muerte Viva (2003)	The Bronx (2006)	The Bronx (2008)

Professional ratings
Review scores
Source	Rating
Absolutepunk	(8.5/10) link
Alternative Press	link
AllMusic	link
BBC Music	link
Drowned in Sound	(5/10) link
IGN	(5.5/10) link
Kerrang!	4/5 stars
NME	(7/10)
PopMatters	(6/10) link
Pluginmusic	(6/10) link
Punknews	link
Rocklouder	link
Rock Sound	(9/10) link

The Bronx is The Bronx's second studio album and the first recording by the band on a major label, Island Def Jam. Released on July 18, 2006, it is the band's second eponymous album and has a change in musical style. It was leaked online on April 26, 2006, almost two months before it was released on vinyl LP.

The album was named best album of the year by Rock Sound magazine and was in Spin magazine's list of the top 40 albums of the year at number 36.

== Track listing ==
No.	Title	Length
1.	"Senor Hombre De Tamale"	1:06
2.	"Small Stone"	0:52
3.	"Shitty Future"	2:09
4.	"History's Stranglers"	2:45
5.	"Oceans of Class"	2:31
6.	"Dirty Leaves"	4:25
7.	"Transsexual Blackout (The Movement)"	2:32
8.	"Mouth Money"	2:35
9.	"Rape Zombie"	2:41
10.	"Around the Horn"	2:07
11.	"Three Dead Sisters"	2:40
12.	"Safe Passage"	3:34
13.	"White Guilt"	3:46

Vinyl Bonus Tracks
No.	Title	Length
14.	"Rockers NYC"
15.	"Venice"

== Personnel ==
- Jorma Vik - drums
- Matt Caughthran - vocals
- Joby J. Ford - guitar
- James Tweedy - bass guitar

== Vinyl information ==
1st press : 1,000 White
