= The Bronx (2003 album) =

Studio album by The Bronx
- Released: August 26, 2003
- Recorded: 2003
- Genre: Hardcore punk; garage punk
- Length: 31:30
- Label: Ferret; White Drugs; Tarantulas; Shock
- Producer: Gilby Clarke and The Bronx

The Bronx chronology
The Bronx (2003)	La Muerte Viva (2003)

Professional ratings
Review scores
Source	Rating
AllMusic	link
Drowned in Sound	9/10 link
Kerrang!	5/5 stars
Lambgoat.com	7/10 link
Lost at Sea	8.5/10 link
Neumu.net	7/10 link
Punknews.org	link
Shakingthrough.net	5.4/10 link
Spin	7/10 link

The Bronx is The Bronx's debut studio album and the first recording by the band on Ferret Records. Released on August 26, 2003, it is the first of six self-titled albums and was also released on the band's own White Drugs record label.

== Release ==
The album was released in a digipack in Australia, Japan and the United Kingdom (U.K.). The Australian and UK versions contain a cover version of the X song "Los Angeles," while the Japanese CD, released on Sonic Label, featured four additional songs, including the X cover version. The X song was later released in the U.S. on the limited edition Tarantulas Records vinyl release, sold under license from the White Drugs label. The song "False Alarm" is featured as an on-disc playable song in the 2010 video game Rock Band 3, and the song "Notice of Eviction" is featured in the soundtrack for the 2004 video-game Need for Speed: Underground 2.

== Influence ==
Simon Ridley, drummer of Brisbane, Australia band DZ Deathrays identified the album as one of seven that changed his life and described it as "a psych up album for nights when I’m too tired but need to party." Ridley further explained: “Every song on this album is fucking rad!"

== Track listing ==
All tracks are written by The Bronx.

The Bronx track listing
No.	Title	Length
1.	"Heart Attack American"	2:51
2.	"False Alarm"	2:12
3.	"White Tar"	2:57
4.	"Cobra Lucha"	2:47
5.	"They Will Kill Us All (Without Mercy)"	3:49
6.	"I Got Chills"	2:19
7.	"Gun Without Bullets"	3:00
8.	"Notice of Eviction"	2:16
9.	"Kill My Friends"	2:10
10.	"Strobe Life"	4:32

Bonus track on Australian, Japanese and vinyl releases
No.	Title	Length
11.	"Los Angeles (originally by X)"	2:27

Bonus track on Japanese releases
No.	Title	Length
12.	"Stop the Bleeding"	3:02
13.	"Bats!"	2:26
14.	"All This Is"	3:03

== Vinyl release ==
Limited edition: 1000 copies pressed on grey marble vinyl by the Tarantulas Records music company.

== Personnel ==
The Bronx

- Jorma Vik – drums
- Matt Caughthran – vocals
- Joby J. Ford – guitar
- James Tweedy – bass guitar

== Charts ==
Chart performance for The Bronx
Chart (2023)	Peak position
Australian Albums (ARIA)	88
