= The Bronx (2008 album) =

Studio album by The Bronx
- Released: November 11, 2008
- Recorded: June 2008
- Length: 33:13
- Labels: Distort, White Drugs
- Producer: Dave Schiffman

The Bronx chronology
The Bronx (2006)	The Bronx (2008)	Mariachi El Bronx (2009)

Singles from The Bronx
- 1. "Young Bloods" Released: March 4, 2009

The Bronx is the third studio album by punk rock band The Bronx. It was released on November 11, 2008.

Professional ratings
Review scores
Source	Rating
Alternative Press	3.5/5 stars
CHARTattack	3/5 stars
Drowned in Sound	(7/10)
Gigwise	(8/10)
NME	7/10 stars
Now Magazine	3/5 stars
The Observer	3/5 stars
Spin	3.5/5 stars
Sputnikmusic	4.5/5 stars

== Track listing ==
No.	Title	Length
1.	"Knifeman"	3:55
2.	"Inveigh"	2:48
3.	"Past Lives"	3:29
4.	"Enemy Mind"	3:09
5.	"Pleasure Seekers"	3:02
6.	"Six Days a Week"	3:09
7.	"Young Bloods"	2:54
8.	"Ship High in Transit"	2:21
9.	"Minutes in Night"	2:43
10.	"Spanish Handshake"	3:17
11.	"Digital Leash"	2:26
