= The Bronx (band) =

American punk rock band

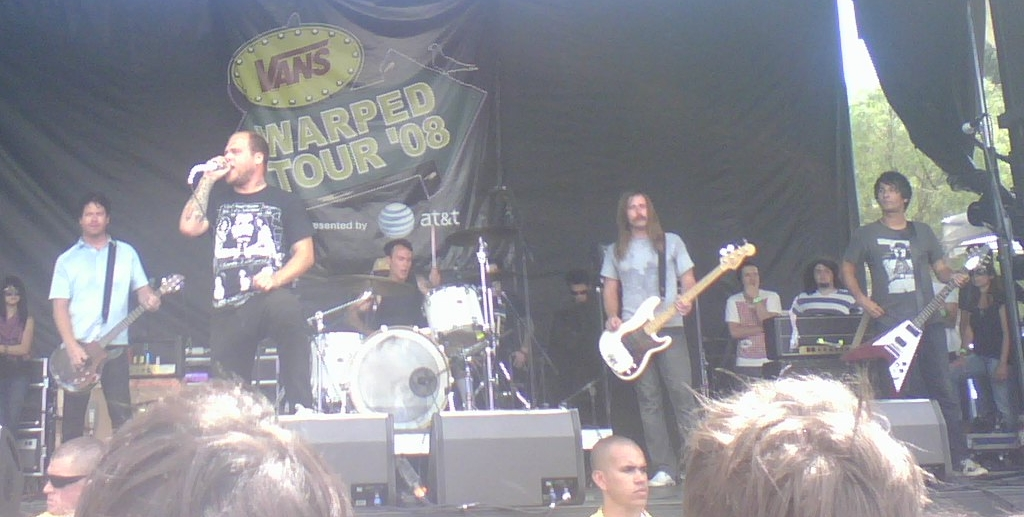
- The Bronx performing on the Warped Tour in Chula Vista, California on August 14, 2008. Left to right: Joby J. Ford, Matt Caughthran, Jorma Vik, Brad Magers, and Ken Horne.

Background information
- Also known as: Mariachi El Bronx
- Origin: Los Angeles, California, U.S.
- Genres: Hardcore punk; punk rock; hard rock; garage punk
- Years active: 2002–present
- Labels: Wichita; Island Def Jam; White Drugs; ATO; MapleMusic (Canada)
- Members: Matt Caughthran; Joby J. Ford; Ken Horne; Brad Magers; Joey Castillo
- Past members: James Tweedy; Jorma Vik; David Hidalgo Jr.
- Website: thebronxxx.com

The Bronx is an American punk rock band from Los Angeles, California, originally formed in 2002. The band's current lineup consists of vocalist Matt Caughthran, guitarists Joby J. Ford and Ken Horne, bass guitarist Brad Magers, and drummer Joey Castillo. The band has released six studio albums, as well as four additional albums of mariachi music under the moniker of Mariachi El Bronx.

== History ==
The initial lineup of The Bronx consisted of Caughthran, Ford, bassist James Tweedy, and drummer Jorma Vik. At their first performance they impressed Jonathan Daniel, manager of American Hi-Fi, who became their manager; and as early as their second show had attracted the attention of A&R representatives from major record labels. After only twelve live performances the band signed a contract with the Island Def Jam Music Group. However, feeling as though they were not yet ready to record for a major label, the band opted to form their own label, White Drugs, to put out their first few releases. They recorded a demo entitled Sure Death in 2002, followed by their first single "Bats!" in 2003. Their debut album The Bronx was released in August 2003. It was produced by Gilby Clarke (Guns N' Roses) and recorded in his kitchen. This was followed by an EP, La Muerte Viva, that November. To support the album, singles and music videos were released for the songs "They Will Kill Us All (Without Mercy)" and "False Alarm". The band toured the United States and Australia in support of the album. In Australia, the band's performance at the Annandale Hotel in Sydney was filmed, later released as the DVD Live at the Annandale.

The Bronx's major-label debut was The Bronx (2006), a second eponymous album that was supported by singles and music videos for "History's Stranglers", "White Guilt" and "Shitty Future". Ken Horne of The Dragons played some guitar parts on the album, and soon joined the band as second guitarist.

In April 2007, the band announced that they would record two new albums. The Bronx was planned as a punk rock album, while Mariachi El Bronx would be a mariachi album. They entered a recording studio in March 2008 to begin work on both albums, with Brad Magers (formerly of Christiansen and Your Highness Electric) replacing Tweedy on bass guitar, and Vincent Hidalgo (formerly of The Drips) also joining Mariachi El Bronx. That June they posted the new song "Knifeman", from The Bronx, on their Myspace profile, followed by the premiere of "PR Rules" from El Bronx. During summer 2008, The Bronx played the entirety of the Warped Tour. They also appeared in the film What We Do Is Secret as Black Flag, performing the Black Flag song "Police Story". Beginning with preparations for the release of El Bronx, the band has performed as "Mariachi El Bronx" when playing their mariachi set and as "The Bronx" for rock sets. The Bronx was released on November 11, 2008, with El Bronx following on August 17, 2009. The band toured North America, followed by a festival performance in the United Kingdom. A second album of mariachi music, Mariachi El Bronx, was released in August 2011.

Several members of the band also appear on the debut EP by Armistice, a Canadian indie pop band consisting of Coeur de pirate and Jay Malinowski.

In 2012, Mariachi El Bronx collaborated with rapper Schoolly D for the theme song to Adult Swim's show Aqua Something You Know Whatever.

Mariachi El Bronx currently perform between segments on the El Rey Network wrestling programme Lucha Underground.

On June 26, 2016, drummer Jorma Vik announced his departure from both The Bronx and Mariachi El Bronx, later joining Eagles of Death Metal as their touring drummer. He was replaced by David Hidalgo Jr., who also plays with Mariachi El Bronx.

In June 2017, the band's Facebook page was updated with the album art for V, the fifth studio album by the band. A teaser was uploaded to the page the following month. The album is the second studio album of their career not to be named The Bronx or Mariachi El Bronx. It was released on September 22, 2017.

In 2018, Hidalgo, Jr. was replaced in The Bronx by former Queens of the Stone Age drummer Joey Castillo. The band released their sixth album, The Bronx VI, in August of 2021. In 2025, the band announced the fourth Mariachi El Bronx album, which is set for release in February 2026.

== Band members ==
=== The Bronx ===
Current

- Matt Caughthran – lead vocals (2002–present)
- Joby J. Ford – guitar, backing vocals (2002–present)
- Ken Horne – guitar, backing vocals (2006–present)
- Brad Magers – bass, backing vocals (2007–present)
- Joey Castillo – drums (2018–present)

Former

- James Tweedy – bass, backing vocals (2002–2007)
- Jorma Vik – drums (2002–2016)
- David Hidalgo Jr. – drums (2016–2018)
- Bianca Paredes - guitars (2016-2016)

Touring

- Atom Willard – drums (2022; substitute for Joey Castillo)
- Vincent Hidalgo – guitar (2018, 2023–2024; substitute for Joby Ford)
- Pete Parada – drums (2023–2024; substitute for Joey Castillo)

Timeline

=== Mariachi El Bronx ===
Current

- Matt Caughthran – lead vocals (2007–present)
- Joby J. Ford – requinto, vihuela, jarana huasteca, ukulele, bajo sexto, accordion, guitar (2007–present)
- Ken Horne – guitar, requinto, jarana huasteca (2007–present)
- Brad Magers – trumpet, percussion, backing vocals (2007–present)
- Vincent Hidalgo – guitarrón, jarana huasteca, guitar (2007–present)
- Keith Douglas – trumpet, percussion, backing vocals (2011–present)
- Jared Shavelson – percussion, drums (2018–present)
- Katie Jacoby – violin, backing vocals (2026-present)

Former

- Jorma Vik – percussion, drums (2007–2015)
- Ray Suen – violin, guitar, harp, requinto, vihuela, jarana huasteca, backing vocals (2011–2018)
- David Hidalgo Jr. – percussion, drums (2015–2018)
- Rebecca Schlappich – violin, backing vocals (2015–2024)
- Laena Myers – violin, backing vocals (2024–2025)

Timeline

== Discography ==
As The Bronx

- The Bronx (2003)
- The Bronx (2006)
- The Bronx (2008)
- The Bronx (2013)
- Bronx V (2017)
- The Bronx VI (2021)

As Mariachi El Bronx

- Mariachi El Bronx (2009)
- Mariachi El Bronx (2011)
- Mariachi El Bronx (2014)
- Música Muerta Vol. 1 & Vol. 2 (2020)
- Mariachi El Bronx (2026)
