= Wichita Recordings =

London-based independent record label

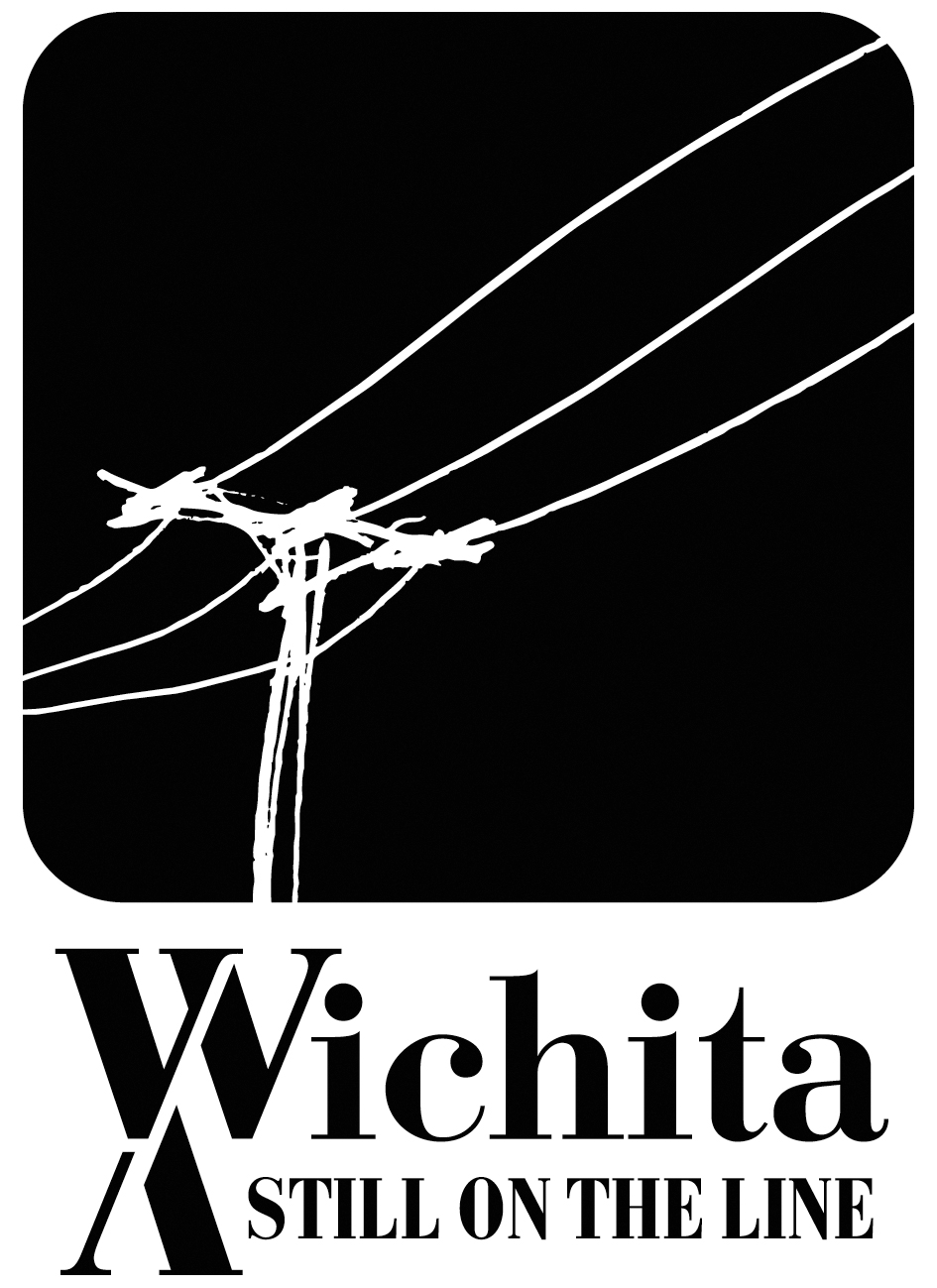
- Founded: 2000; 25 years ago
- Founder: Mark Bowen, Dick Green
- Distributor: PIAS
- Genre: Rock, indie rock, punk rock, folk, experimental
- Country of origin: United Kingdom
- Location: London
- Official website: www.wichita-recordings.com

Wichita Recordings is a London based independent record label founded in 2000 by Mark Bowen and Dick Green. Its most notable signees include Bloc Party, The Cribs, Clap Your Hands Say Yeah, Bright Eyes, My Morning Jacket, Yeah Yeah Yeahs, Best Coast, Los Campesinos! and Peter Bjorn and John. The label signed Clap Your Hands Say Yeah for a UK distribution deal for the group's debut album. They also signed the UK producers Simian Mobile Disco for the UK.

The label's first release was the UK release of the Bright Eyes album Fevers and Mirrors, released in 2000.

Wichita Management runs alongside the label, and currently represents Gold Panda, Brolin, Shannon and the Clams, Open Mike Eagle, Cloud Nothings, Dan Tombs, Luke Abbott, Frankie & The Heartstrings, Peggy Sue, Star Slinger, Dam Mantle and Theo Verney.

2015 saw Wichita Recordings celebrate 15 years as a label, and have released new music from FIDLAR, Cheatahs, Meg Baird, Frankie & The Heartstrings, Girlpool, Waxahatchee and Total Babes.

2016 releases included Globelamp's debut LP The Orange Glow, Mothers' debut LP When You Walk A Long Distance You Are Tired, and the debut from Oscar, Cut and Paste.

== Current artists ==
- Cheatahs
- Cloud Nothings
- Espers
- Euros Childs
- FIDLAR
- Frankie & The Heartstrings
- Girlpool
- Gold Panda
- Greg Weeks
- Indoor Pets
- Lovvers
- Meg Baird
- Mothers
- Oscar
- Peggy Sue
- Ride
- Slow Club
- Swearin'
- Total Babes
- Waxahatchee
- Young Legionnaire

== Former artists ==
- Best Coast
- Bloc Party
- The Blood Brothers
- Bright Eyes
- The Bumblebeez
- The Bronx
- Canyon
- Cate Le Bon
- Conor Oberst
- Brave Captain
- Euros Childs
- Clap Your Hands Say Yeah
- The Cribs
- Desaparecidos
- The Dodos
- The Drips
- Elastica
- First Aid Kit
- Giant Drag
- Globelamp
- Her Space Holiday
- Kele
- Kid606
- Les Savy Fav
- Lissy Trullie
- Los Campesinos!
- My Morning Jacket
- Northern State
- The Pattern
- Penfold Plum
- Peter Bjorn and John
- Peter Morén
- Ruby
- Saul Williams
- Simian Mobile Disco
- Sky Larkin
- Spectrals
- Those Dancing Days
- Times New Viking
- Wauvenfold
- Weevil
- Wild Flag
- Yeah Yeah Yeahs

== See also ==
- Category:Wichita Recordings albums
- List of record labels
- List of independent UK record labels
