= Matt Caughthran =

American singer

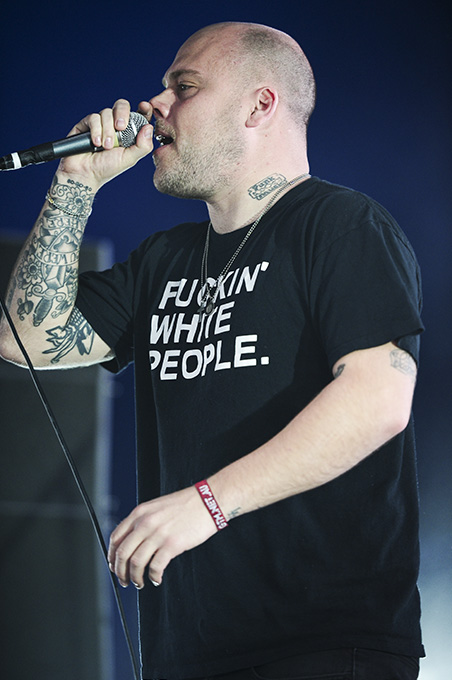
- Caughthran in 2013

Background information
- Birth name: Matt Caughthran
- Born: 13 February 1979 (age 46)
- Genres: Punk rock, hardcore punk, hard rock, mariachi music
- Instrument: Vocals
- Member of: The Bronx, Mariachi El Bronx, The Drips

Matt Caughthran (born February 13, 1979) is an American singer, best known as the frontman for Los Angeles–based punk band The Bronx and Mariachi El Bronx. In addition to The Bronx, Caughthran is involved in a side project, The Drips. Caughthran has also recorded a number of tracks with Bullet Treatment which can be found on the What More Do You Want? EP and the full length The Mistake. He has also provided guest vocals for Biffy Clyro, Trash Talk, Oppenheimer, Every Time I Die and DZ Deathrays.
