= The Cribs discography =

- Studio albums: 9
- EPs: 1
- Live albums: 1
- Compilation albums: 1
- Singles: 30
- Promotional singles: 7
- Video albums: 1
- Music videos: 30
- Split singles: 3

The discography of the English rock band the Cribs consists of nine studio albums, one compilation album, thirty singles, one EP, and thirty music videos. The Cribs was formed in 2001 by twins Gary and Ryan Jarman and their younger brother Ross Jarman. The band signed to Wichita Recordings in 2003 and released the singles "Another Number", "You Were Always the One" and "What About Me" from their debut album The Cribs which released in March 2004. The latter two singles reached the UK Singles Chart Top 100.

The Cribs released their second studio album The New Fellas in July 2005. Despite having leaked onto internet file sharing sites and message boards, it was more successful than their debut album, charting at #78 on the UK Albums Chart, this would be their first entry on the chart. The album produced three singles, "Hey Scenesters!", "Mirror Kissers" and "Martell", all of which reached the top 40 of the UK Singles Chart, another first for the band.

The band's third studio album Men's Needs, Women's Needs, Whatever was released in May 2007. The album performed even better than the last, reaching #13 in the UK and also charting on the Scottish Albums Chart as well as the Irish Albums Chart. The album also spawned the band's most popular single "Men's Needs" which reached #17 in the UK, and also charted in various other countries charts. Singles "Moving Pictures" and "Don't You Wanna Be Relevant? / Our Bovine Public" also reached the top 40 in UK, completing a run of 7 consecutive Top 40 singles for the band.

The Cribs following albums; Ignore the Ignorant, In the Belly of the Brazen Bull, For All My Sisters and 24-7 Rock Star Shit would all reach the top 10 in UK. The band's eighth studio album Night Network was the first since 2009's Ignore the Ignorant to not reach the UK top 10, peaking at number 19.

In 2022, the band re-released their first three albums, which all reached the UK Album Chart, charting against the likes of Beyoncé. All three albums topped their previous charting positions including the band's debut which never reached the charts upon release. On August 5, 2022, The Cribs became the first band to chart three studio albums in the Official Scottish Albums Chart simultaneously.

== Albums ==
=== Studio albums ===
List of studio albums, with selected chart positions and certifications
Title	Album details	Peak chart positions						Certifications
Title	Album details	UK	UK Ind.	AUS Hit.	IRL	JPN	SCO	Certifications
The Cribs	Released: 8 March 2004; Label: Wichita; Formats: CD, LP, digital download	23	4	—	—	—	8	
The New Fellas	Released: 1 July 2005; Label: Wichita; Formats: CD, LP, digital download	20	3	—	—	—	4	BPI: Silver
Men's Needs, Women's Needs, Whatever	Released: 21 May 2007; Label: Wichita, Warner Bros.; Formats: CD, LP, digital download	13	1	—	87	107	5	BPI: Gold
Ignore the Ignorant	Released: 7 September 2009; Label: Wichita, Warner Bros.; Formats: CD, LP, digital download	8	×	—	46	88	14	BPI: Silver
In the Belly of the Brazen Bull	Released: 7 May 2012; Label: Wichita; Formats: CD, LP, digital download	9	2	—	—	177	10	
For All My Sisters	Released: 23 March 2015; Label: Sonic Blew / Sony RED UK, Arts & Crafts Productions; Formats: CD, LP, cassette, digital download	9	×	19	—	161	16	
24-7 Rock Star Shit	Released: 11 August 2017; Label: Sonic Blew / Sony RED; Formats: CD, LP, cassette, digital download	8	2	—	—	—	7	
Night Network	Released: 20 November 2020; Label: Sonic Blew / PIAS; Formats: CD, LP, cassette, digital download	19	4	—	—	—	18	
Selling a Vibe	Released: 9 January 2026; Label: Sonic Blew / PIAS; Formats: CD, LP, cassette, digital download	5	2	—	—	—	2	
"—" denotes a recording that did not chart or was not released in that territory. "×" denotes ineligible charts.

=== Live albums ===
List of live albums with selected chart positions
Title	Album details	Peak chart positions		
Title	Album details	UK Rec.	UK Ind.	SCO
Live at the Cavern	Released: 9 June 2023; Label: Sonic Blew / PIAS; Formats: digital download	12	36	94

=== Compilation albums ===
List of compilation albums with selected chart positions
Title	Album details	Peak chart positions		
Title	Album details	UK	UK Ind.	SCO
Payola: 2002–2012	Released: 25 February 2013; Label: Wichita; Formats: CD, LP, digital download	69	14	80

== Extended plays ==
List of EPs and with selected chart positions
Title	EP details	Peak chart positions
Title	EP details	UK Vinyl
Vs. The Moths: College Sessions 2001	Released: October 28th 2022; Label: Kill Rock Stars	1

== Singles ==
List of singles, with selected chart positions and certifications, showing year released and album name
Title	Year	Peak chart positions							Certifications	Album
Title	Year	UK	UK Indie	UK R&B	BEL	EUR	MEX	SCO	Certifications	Album
"Another Number" / "Baby Don't Sweat" (Note: "Another Number" / "Baby Don't Sweat" were released as a limited edition 7" single only.)	2004	126	46	—	—	—	—	—		The Cribs
"You Were Always the One"	2004	66	17	—	—	—	—	—		The Cribs
"What About Me"	2004	75	12	—	—	—	—	—		The Cribs
"Hey Scenesters!"	2005	27	2	15	—	85	—	21		The New Fellas
"Mirror Kissers"	2005	27	2	—	—	83	—	28		The New Fellas
"Martell"	2005	39	5	—	—	—	—	76		The New Fellas
"You're Gonna Lose Us"	2005	30	4	—	—	93	—	27		Non-album single
"Men's Needs"	2007	17	×	—	68	51	—	15	BPI: Silver	Men's Needs, Women's Needs, Whatever
"Moving Pictures"	2007	38	×	—	—	—	—	13		Men's Needs, Women's Needs, Whatever
"Don't You Wanna Be Relevant? / Our Bovine Public"	2007	39	×	—	—	—	—	12		Men's Needs, Women's Needs, Whatever
"I'm a Realist"	2008	× (Note: "I'm a Realist" was ineligible for the UK Singles Chart, but peaked at number 34 on the Official Physical Singles Chart Top 100.)	×	—	—	—	—	28		Men's Needs, Women's Needs, Whatever
"Cheat on Me"	2009	80	×	—	—	—	20	5		Ignore the Ignorant
"We Share the Same Skies"	2009	× (Note: "We Share the Same Skies" was ineligible for the UK Singles Chart, but peaked at number 34 on the Official Physical Singles Chart Top 100.)	×	—	—	—	—	—		Ignore the Ignorant
"Housewife" (Note: "Housewife" was released as a 7" single only.))	2010	105	×	—	—	—	—	—		Non-album single
"Chi-Town"	2012	—	—	—	—	—	49	—		In the Belly of the Brazen Bull
"Come On, Be a No-One"	2012	— (Note: "Come On, Be a No-One" did not enter the UK Singles Chart, but peaked at number 7 on the Official Physical Singles Chart Top 100.)	30	—	—	—	—	—		In the Belly of the Brazen Bull
"Glitters Like Gold"	2012	— (Note: "Glitters Like Gold" did not enter the UK Singles Chart, but peaked at number 4 on the UK Physical Singles Chart.)	—	—	—	—	—	—		In the Belly of the Brazen Bull
"Leather Jacket Love Song"	2013	—	—	—	—	—	—	—		Payola
"Burning for No One"	2015	— (Note: "Burning for No One" did not enter the UK Singles Chart, but peaked at number 4 on the Official Physical Singles Chart Top 100.)	—	—	—	—	—	—		For All My Sisters
"Different Angle"	2015	— (Note: "Different Angle" did not enter the UK Singles Chart, but peaked at number 5 on the UK Physical Singles Chart.)	—	—	—	—	—	—		For All My Sisters
"Summer of Chances" (Note: "Summer of Chances" was released as a 7" single only.)	2015	— (Note: "Summer of Chances" did not enter the UK Singles Chart, but peaked at number 7 on the Official Physical Singles Chart Top 100.)	—	—	—	—	—	—		For All My Sisters
"In Your Palace"	2017	—	—	—	—	—	—	—		24–7 Rock Star Shit
"Year of Hate"	2017	— (Note: "Year of Hate" did not enter the UK Singles Chart, but peaked at number 3 on the Official Physical Singles Chart Top 100.)	—	—	—	—	—	—		24–7 Rock Star Shit
"Running into You"	2020	— (Note: "Running Into You" did not enter the UK Singles Chart, but peaked at number 69 on the UK Singles Sales Chart Top 100.)	—	—	—	—	—	2		Night Network
"Never Thought I'd Feel Again"	2020	—	—	—	—	—	—	—		Night Network
"Christmas All Year Long"	2020	— (Note: "Christmas All Year Long" did not enter the UK Singles Chart, but peaked at number 8 on the Official Physical Singles Chart Top 100.)	—	—	—	—	—	11		Non-album singles
"Swinging at Shadows" / "Taken to Tualatin"	2021	— (Note: "Swinging At Shadows" / "Taken To Tualatin" did not enter the UK Singles Chart, but peaked at number 6 on the Official Physical Singles Chart Top 100.)	—	—	—	—	—	×		Non-album singles
"The Day I Got Lost Again" / "Opaline and Evergreen"	2021	— (Note: "The Day I Got Lost Again" / "Opaline and Evergreen" did not enter the UK Singles Chart, but peaked at number 51 on the UK Singles Sales Chart Top 100.)	—	—	—	—	—	×		Non-album singles
"Sucked Sweet" / "Bad Dream"	2021	— (Note: "Sucked Sweet" / "Bad Dream" did not enter the UK Singles Chart, but peaked at number 4 on the Official Physical Singles Chart Top 100.)	—	—	—	—	—	×		Non-album singles
"Things Could Be Better" / "Yellow Venus"	2021	— (Note: "Things Could Be Better" / "Yellow Venus" did not enter the UK Singles Chart, but peaked at number 54 on the UK Singles Sales Chart Top 100.)	—	—	—	—	—	×		Non-album singles
"Summer Seizures"	2025	—	—	—	—	—	—	×		Selling a Vibe
"A Point Too Hard to Make"	2025	—	—	—	—	—	—	×		Selling a Vibe
"Never the Same"	2026	—	—	—	—	—	—	×		Selling a Vibe
"—" denotes a recording that did not chart or was not released in that territory. "×" denotes ineligible charts or periods where charts did not exist or were not archived.

=== Promotional singles ===
Title	Year	Album
"Anna"	2012	In the Belly of the Brazen Bull
"Rainbow Ridge"	2017	24-7 Rock Star Shit
"What Have You Done for Me?"	2017	24-7 Rock Star Shit
"I Don't Know Who I Am"	2020	Night Network
"In the Room"	2022	The New Fellas - Definitive Edition
"Feelin’ It!" (4-Track Demo)	2022	The Cribs - Definitive Edition
"Shoot the Poets" (Demo)	2022	Men's Needs, Women's Needs, Whatever - Definitive Edition

=== Split singles ===
Title	Year	Other artist(s)	Album
"Baby Don't Sweat" "You & I" / "Dig The Halo" "Well Now It's Too Loud"	2003	Jen Schande	Non-album single
"Another Number" / "Modern Way"	2005	Kaiser Chiefs	Non-album single
"So Hot Now" / "Separate"	2010	The Thermals	Non-album single
"—" denotes a recording that did not chart or was not released in that territory.

== Other charted songs ==
List of other charted songs, with selected chart positions, showing year released and album name
Title	Year	Peak chart positions		Album
Title	Year	UK	SCO	Album
"My Life Flashed Before My Eyes"	2008	193	—	Men's Needs, Women's Needs, Whatever
"It Happened So Fast"	2013	—	87	Payola
"—" denotes a recording that did not chart or was not released in that territory.

== Videography ==
=== Video albums ===
Title	Details	Peak chart positions
Title	Details	UK DVD
Live at the Brudenell Social Club	Released: 15 December 2008; Label: Wichita; Format: 3×DVD	25

=== Music videos ===
List of music videos, showing year released and director
Title	Year	Director(s)	Ref(s)
"You Were Always the One"		Adam Fair	
"What About Me"		Mafe Valen	
"Hey Scenesters"		Chris Cairns	
"Martell"		Aoife McArdle	
"Mirror Kissers"		Diamond Dogs	
"You're Gonna Lose Us"		Sarah Chatfield/Chris Sweeney	
"Men's Needs"	2007	Diane Martel	
"Moving Pictures"	2007	Norwood Cheek	
"Don't You Wanna Be Relevant?"	2007	Dan & Jason	
"Our Bovine Public"	2007	Patrick Stanton	
"I'm a Realist"	2007	3 Pronged Attack/Patrick Holtkamp	
"Cheat on Me"	2009	Steven Drypolcher/Partizan	
"We Share the Same Skies"	2009	Daniel Brereton	
"Housewife"	2010	Luke Bellis	
"Come On, Be a No-One"	2012	Patrick Stanton	
"Glitters Like Gold"	2012	Andrew Knowles and Stephen Agnew	
"Anna"	2012	Martin Creed	
"Leather Jacket Love Song"	2013	Andrew Knowles	
"Burning for No One"	2015	Nick Scott and Andrew Knowles	
"Different Angle"	2015	Andy Sonnefeld	
"Summer of Chances"	2015	Hiromix	
"In Your Palace"	2017	Andy Knowles and Simon Lewis	
"Rainbow Ridge"	2017	Andy Knowles and Simon Lewis	
"Running into You"	2020	Andy Knowles and Nick Scott	
"I Don't Know Who I Am"	2020	Nick Scott	
"Never Thought I'd Feel Again"	2020	Andy Knowles and Nick Scott	
"Siren Sing-Along"	2021	Nick Scott	
"Swinging at Shadows"	2021	Alexander Preston	
"Sucked Sweet"	2021	Josh McCartney	
"In the Room"	2022	Andy Knowles	
