= Payola (The Cribs album) =

Compilation album by The Cribs

Payola, 2002 - 2012

Compilation album by The Cribs
- Released: 11 March 2013
- Recorded: Tarbox Road, New York City; Electrical Audio, Chicago
- Genre: Indie rock, punk rock, alternative rock
- Label: (United Kingdom) (Republic of Ireland) Wichita Recordings
- Producer: The Cribs, Ed Deegan, Edwyn Collins, Bernard Butler, Alex Kapranos, Nick Launay, Dave Fridmann, Steve Albini, Lee Smith, Jamie Lockhart, Will Jackson

The Cribs chronology
In the Belly of the Brazen Bull (2012)	Payola, 2002 - 2012 (2013)	For All My Sisters (2015)

Payola: 2002 - 2012 is a greatest hits compilation album by UK indie rock band, The Cribs. The album was scheduled for release on 25 February 2013, however; due to manufacturing complications, the release date was pushed back a further two weeks to 11 March 2013. The album features the previously unreleased single "Leather Jacket Love Song" - the last song recorded with erstwhile guitarist Johnny Marr.

Professional ratings
Review scores
Source	Rating
DIY	9/10 stars
Mojo	4/5 stars
Drowned in Sound	8/10 stars
The Quietus	8/10 stars
Clash	8/10 stars
Uncut	6/10 stars

== Formats ==
The album was released as a standard edition 22-track CD and download, plus a 22-track double LP. A special 40 track 'Anthology Edition' CD was also released which included a bonus 18-track disc of b-sides.

== Track listing ==
All tracks are written by The Cribs (Ryan Jarman, Ross Jarman and Gary Jarman).

Payola (cat no. - WEBB360DL)
No.	Title	Length
1.	"Another Number"	2:52
2.	"Come On, Be a No-One"	2:37
3.	"I'm a Realist"	3:05
4.	"Hey Scenesters!"	3:14
5.	"We Share the Same Skies"	3:14
6.	"You were Always the One"	2:31
7.	"Anna"	3:04
8.	"Cheat on Me"	3:24
9.	"Back to the Bolthole"	4:48
10.	"We Were Aborted"	3:09
11.	"Our Bovine Public"	2:18
12.	"I've Tried Everything"	2:47
13.	"Direction"	3:31
14.	"Glitters Like Gold"	4:16
15.	"Be Safe" (also written by Lee Ranaldo)	5:55
16.	"Mirror Kisses"	3:37
17.	"Men's Needs"	3:18
18.	"We Can No Longer Cheat You"	3:04
19.	"Chi-Town"	3:20
20.	"The Wrong Way to Be"	3:47
21.	"City of Bugs"	6:22
22.	"Leather Jacket Love Song"	3:06
Total length:		1:14:19

Bonus Disc

1. Glandular Fever Go the Best of Me
2. On a Hotel Wall
3. Saturday Night Facts of Life
4. Kind Words from The Broken Hearted
5. It Happened So Fast
6. Eat Me
7. Fairer Sex
8. Advice from a Roving Artist
9. You're Gonna Lose Us
10. Get Yr Hands Out of My Grave
11. My Adolescent Dreams
12. Bastards of Young
13. To Jackson
14. Better Than Me
15. So Hot Now
16. Is Anybody There?
17. Don't You Wanna Be Relevant?
18. Don't Believe in Me

== Critical reception ==
Payola was well received by critics. DIY magazine called it a "staggeringly good collection of songs" and ruminated that the album "offers a compelling argument of the threesome as the most important and greatest UK band of the past 10 years" in a 9/10 review. In their 8/10 review, Virgin notes that "This release shows what a huge footprint The Cribs have made on the modern music scene." Q magazine referred to the album as "A reminder of their heartfelt commitment to a struggling underground ideal" in a 4 star review, whilst The Quietus called The Cribs "A national treasure". In a more mixed 6/10 review, Uncut magazine praised the band's ability to write a single, but refers to the b-side disc as "best left to the completists".
