= Anna (The Cribs song) =

Single by The Cribs

from the album In the Belly of the Brazen Bull
- Released: 17 September 2012
- Recorded: Tarbox Road, Cassadaga, New York, US
- Genre: Indie rock; alternative rock
- Length: 3:03
- Label: Wichita Recordings
- Songwriters: Gary Jarman; Ross Jarman; Ryan Jarman

The Cribs singles chronology
"Glitters Like Gold" (2012)	"Anna" (2012)	"Burning for No One" (2015)

"Anna" is the second promotional single, and fourth overall, taken from the fifth studio album by British indie rock band the Cribs. Unlike the previous two singles released from In the Belly of the Brazen Bull, "Come On, Be a No-One" and "Glitters Like Gold", "Anna" did not receive a physical issue on vinyl. Recorded and mixed at Tarbox Road Studios, Cassadaga, New York with producer David Fridmann, the song received mastering treatment in Sterling Sound, New York City from Greg Calbi.

== Video ==
Although similar to the promotional release of "Chi-Town" in February, instead of a physical issue, "Anna" received a visual interpretation through a collaboration with artist and friend of the band Martin Creed, entitled Work #1431. Creed supported the band on their May tour, and also hails from Wakefield, sharing a mutual point of reference. The video features "personal photographs in a fast paced and jolting yet minimalist sequence to the soundtrack of the song."

== Track listing ==
All tracks are written by Gary Jarman, Ross Jarman and Ryan Jarman.

Digital download
No.	Title	Length
1.	"Anna"	3:03
