= So Hot Now / Separate =

Single by The Cribs and The Thermals
- Released: 17 April 2010
- Recorded: Mastan Music / Jackpot! Portland, Oregon
- Genre: Indie rock, alternative rock
- Length: 3:15 / 3:36
- Label: Kill Rock Stars
- Songwriter(s): Jarman, Jarman, Jarman and Marr / Harris, Foster and Glass
- Producer(s): Jeremy Wilson / Chris Walla

The Cribs singles chronology
| "We Share the Same Skies" (2009) | "So Hot Now / Separate" (2010) | "Housewife" (2010) |

"So Hot Now / Separate" is a split single from British indie rock band The Cribs and American alternative rock band The Thermals, released on Kill Rock Stars on 17 April 2010. The single found release as part of Record Store Day 2010.

== Song information ==
The Cribs originally released "So Hot Now" as a B-side to "Cheat on Me" in September 2009, with Gary on guitar and Ryan on bass duties. The Thermals released "Separate" as a between-albums single, bridging Now We Can See in 2009 and Personal Life, following in September 2010.

== Track listing ==
All tracks are written by Gary Jarman, Ross Jarman, Ryan Jarman and Johnny Marr / Hutch Harris, Kathy Foster and Westin Glass

The Cribs / The Thermals
| No. | Title | Length |
|---|---|---|
| 1. | "So Hot Now" | 3:15 |
| 2. | "Separate" | 3:36 |
