= 24-7 Rock Star Shit =

24–7 Rock Star Shit

Studio album by The Cribs
- Released: 11 August 2017
- Studios: Electrical Audio, Chicago
- Genres: Punk rock, grunge
- Length: 36:16
- Label: Sony RED/Sonic Blew
- Producer: Steve Albini

The Cribs chronology
For All My Sisters (2015)	24–7 Rock Star Shit (2017)	Night Network (2020)

Singles from 24/7 Rock Star Shit
- 1. "In Your Palace" Released: 2 June 2017; 2. "Year of Hate" Released: 16 June 2017; 3. "Rainbow Ridge" Released: 24 July 2017; 4. "What Have You Done For Me?" Released: 3 August 2017

24–7 Rock Star Shit is the seventh studio album by English band The Cribs. It was released in August 2017 under Sonic Blew, a partner label of Sony RED. The album is the band's second album recorded at Electrical Audio with producer Steve Albini, following the recording of "Chi-Town" from 2012's In the Belly of the Brazen Bull. The album has been described as a back-to-basics return to the band's early punk/grunge sound in contrast to the more pop-driven sound of their previous album For All My Sisters.

== Background ==
After collaborating with producer Steve Albini for the song "Chi-Town" on their 2012 album In the Belly of the Brazen Bull, many had speculated that the band would be recording a full LP with the producer. In a 2015 interview with NME, Ryan Jarman commented on their plans to finish an album with Albini having a third of the album already recorded. The band initially decided to carry on working on songs scrapped during the Brazen Bull sessions with Albini for a potential EP, however they found themselves with enough material for a full LP. The album was recorded within 5 days on analog tape with no overdubs or comping of tracks.

In early 2017, the band embarked on a 10-year anniversary tour for their third album Men's Needs, Women's Needs, Whatever as well as re-releasing it on a special gold reissue vinyl via Wichita Recordings. This sparked rumours of a new album from the band. On May 22, the band released a limited edition 7" to 24 independent record stores over 7 days featuring the new song "Year of Hate." On June 2, the band released the track "In Your Palace" which was described by Dork as a "garage punk banger that's still got that sparkle in its eye." On June 15, the band released a short clip on Twitter teasing release of new music the following day. The following day they released the track "Year of Hate" onto digital platforms.

The band officially announced the album alongside the release of the third single "Rainbow Ridge" on 24 July. The band also performed shows at Kingston's New Slang and London's House of Vans to coincide with the album's release.

== Critical reception ==
Professional ratings
Aggregate scores
Source	Rating
Metacritic	68/100
Review scores
Source	Rating
AllMusic	3.5/5 stars
MusicOMH	4/5 stars
Paste Magazine	6.4/10
Drowned in Sound	8/10
The Guardian	3/5 stars
DIY	4/5 stars
The Independent	2/5 stars

24–7 Rock Star Shit has received generally favorable reviews from music critics. At Metacritic, which assigns a normalized rating out of 100 to reviews from mainstream critics, the album received an average score of 68 based on 13 reviews.

Critics praised the band's return-to-basics and have described the album as "brilliant, scrappy, socially-conscious indie punk." The album was described as rawer and less produced than the band's more recent releases returning to the band's "lo-fi roots." Heather Phares from AllMusic compared the album's blend of melody and aggression to that of 1990s bands such as Weezer and Nirvana. She also described the album as "more proof that the band's eternal tug of war between grit and polish still generates excitement." However, in a negative review, Andy Gill with The Independent said that despite the album's title being one of the all-time great rock 'n' roll titles, "lurking behind it is an album which struggles to fulfil such vagabond promise."

== Accolades ==
Publication	Accolade	Rank	Ref.
Dork	Top 50 Albums of 2017	36	

== Track listing ==
No.	Title	Length
1.	"Give Good Time"	3:13
2.	"Year Of Hate"	4:06
3.	"In Your Palace"	4:18
4.	"Dendrophobia"	2:59
5.	"What Have You Done For Me?"	3:27
6.	"Sticks Not Twigs"	2:19
7.	"Rainbow Ridge"	3:36
8.	"Partisan"	2:48
9.	"Dead at the Wheel"	4:55
10.	"Broken Arrow"	4:35

== Charts ==
Chart	Peak position
UK Albums (Official Charts)	8

== Personnel ==
Credits adapted from the album's liner notes.

The Cribs

- Gary Jarman – bass guitar, vocals
- Ryan Jarman – guitar, vocals
- Ross Jarman – drums

Additional personnel

- Steve Albini – producer, mixing
- Bob Weston – mastering engineer
- Chris Cooper – cover photo
- Shotaway – cover photo
- Steve Gullick – portraits
- Nick Scott – artwork, layout
- James Moodie – product manager
- Ali Tant – product manager
