= Glitters Like Gold =

Single by The Cribs

from the album In the Belly of the Brazen Bull
- B-side: "On a Hotel Wall"
- Released: 22 July 2012
- Recorded: Cassadaga, New York, 2011
- Genre: Indie rock; alternative rock
- Length: 4:13
- Label: Wichita Recordings
- Songwriters: Gary Jarman; Ross Jarman; Ryan Jarman
- Producer: David Fridmann

The Cribs singles chronology
"Come On, Be a No-One" (2012)	"Glitters Like Gold" (2012)	"Anna" (2012)

"Glitters Like Gold" is the third release and second official single taken from the fifth studio album by British indie rock band the Cribs, released in July 2012. "Glitters Like Gold" featured throughout the February and March 2012 tour at venues in London, Edinburgh, Brighton and Leeds, and opens fifth LP In the Belly of the Brazen Bull.

Recorded and mixed at Tarbox Road Studios, Cassadaga with producer David Fridmann, the song received mastering treatment in Sterling Sound, New York City from Greg Calbi.

== Physical release ==
Unlike other Cribs releases, the single came in a transparent sleeve with minimal artwork. However, the transparent vinyl features gold glitter sprinkled throughout, and received the catalogue number 'WEBB338S'.

== "On a Hotel Wall" ==
"On a Hotel Wall", the 7-inch single B-side, features a different set-up for the band. Gary plays guitar whereas Ryan Jarman takes up bass duties, and although recorded during the album sessions with Fridmann, did not make the final cut. The band originally intended to hold this song back for a future album, but changed their mind at the last minute. The song reached completion though Chris Potter at Electric Mastering, London.

== Miscellaneous ==
The band released an accompanying video for the song by working with directors Andy Knowles and Stephen Agnew. Based on the 'Pop-Up Videos' of the 1990s, the promo features an interactive element coupled with several 'facts' about the band members, often of a humorous nature. The video received a premiere on influential contemporary music website Pitchfork.

== Track listing ==
All tracks are written by Gary Jarman, Ross Jarman and Ryan Jarman.

7-inch single & digital download
No.	Title	Length
1.	"Glitters Like Gold"	4:13
2.	"On a Hotel Wall"	3:40
