= Night Network (album) =

Studio album by the Cribs
- Released: 20 November 2020
- Recorded: Spring / Summer 2019
- Studios: Studio 606, Los Angeles, California
- Labels: Sonic Blew; PIAS
- Producer: The Cribs

The Cribs chronology
24-7 Rock Star Shit (2017)	Night Network (2020)	Selling a Vibe (2026)

Singles from Night Network
- 1. "Running into You" Released: 13 August 2020; 2. "I Don't Know Who I Am" Released: 21 September 2020; 3. "Never Thought I'd Feel Again" Released: 16 October 2020

Night Network is the eighth studio album by English band the Cribs. It was released on 20 November 2020 via PIAS, under the band's own Sonic Blew imprint. The album is the band's first fully self-produced album. The album was recorded over spring / summer of 2019, at the Foo Fighters' Studio 606 in Los Angeles, California, and at Halfling Studios in Portland, OR.

== Background ==
Following the release of their fourth consecutive UK top 10 album 24-7 Rock Star Shit, the band almost immediately parted company with their long time UK management and found themselves stuck in what Gary (lead vocals, bass) described as "legal morass", unable to record or release new music. What followed was an eighteen-month period of inactivity, resulting in 2019 being the only year since the band's inception in 2002 whereby the band did not play a live concert, following their final gig of the 24-7 Rock Star Shit tour in Glasgow in September 2018. In a position of uncertainty about how to continue beyond the already booked gigs, following a show where the Cribs had supported Foo Fighters in Manchester at the Etihad Stadium in June 2018, Dave Grohl learned of the band's struggles and offered for the band to use his recording studio Studio 606; "Forget about all that business stuff, just come out to L.A. and make a record at our studio".

During 2020, the band was active on Twitter to participate in Tim Burgess' "Listening Parties", offering behind the scenes insight for their most commercially successful album Men's Needs, Women's Needs, Whatever on 7 April. Due to the positive response, this was followed up with another listening party of fan favourite The New Fellas on 28 May.

On 8 June, the band announced on their social media pages, with 4 hours' notice, their first live performance in nearly 2 years. This turned out to be a pre-recorded webcam broadcast of "Be Safe", featuring Lee Ranaldo performing spoken word, from the band's residences across the world (Ryan in Queens, New York, Gary in Portland, Oregon, Ross in Wakefield and Lee in Manhattan, New York).

On 12 August 2020, a day over three years since their last new material 24-7 Rock Star Shit, the band's social media profile pictures changed to a stylised test card. The following day on 13 August 2020, the band announced their return with a new song to be broadcast on BBC Radio 6 Music. The song turned out to be lead single "Running into You" and subsequently the band announced new album "Night Network" to be released on 13 November 2020, along with artwork, tracklisting and a video for "Running into You" starring Sam Riley.

The album marks the return of Lee Ranaldo as guest musician, playing guitar on "I Don't Know Who I Am".

Released into the UK COVID-19 lockdown of 2020, the band had all of their scheduled headline touring to support the album delayed. The album release was therefore celebrated with a socially-distanced performance at Liverpool's legendary Cavern Club on 21 November. This performance was streamed worldwide as a PPV via the Veeps platform.

== Critical reception ==
Professional ratings
Aggregate scores
Source	Rating
Metacritic	83/100
Review scores
Source	Rating
AllMusic	4/5 stars
Clash	8/10
Dork	4/5
DIY	4.5/5 stars
Gigwise	10/10 stars
The Independent	3/5 stars
The Line of Best Fit	8.5/10
musicOMH	5/5 stars
NME	5/5 stars
Paste	6.5/10

According to the review aggregator Metacritic, Night Network received "universal acclaim" based on a weighted average score of 83 out of 100 from 10 critic scores. The NME called it "their best album in a decade" and gave the record five stars. Both the NME and The Line of Best Fit recognised the role of Dave Grohl in how the album came together, with the latter concluding: "Night Network is a minor masterpiece. Thank God for Dave Grohl."

== Track listing ==
No.	Title	Length
1.	"Goodbye"	2:39
2.	"Running into You"	2:52
3.	"Screaming in Suburbia"	3:49
4.	"Never Thought I'd Feel Again"	4:09
5.	"Deep Infatuation"	3:24
6.	"I Don't Know Who I Am" (feat. Lee Ranaldo)	5:03
7.	"She's My Style"	3:11
8.	"Under the Bus Station Clock"	2:51
9.	"The Weather Speaks Your Name"	4:31
10.	"Siren Sing-Along"	3:11
11.	"Earl & Duke"	3:43
12.	"In the Neon Night"	3:37

== Personnel ==
The Cribs

- Gary Jarman – bass guitar, vocals, keyboards (tracks 1, 5 and 12)
- Ryan Jarman – guitar, vocals
- Ross Jarman – percussion

Additional personnel

- Lee Ranaldo – noise guitar, backing vocals (track 6)
- Jennifer Turner – piano (track 5)
- Mike Clark – piano (track 3), organ (tracks 4 and 8)
- The Cribs – producer, engineer, mixing
- James Brown – engineer, piano (track 5)
- Adam Lee – additional engineering
- Oliver Roman – additional engineering
- John O'Mahony – mixing, engineering
- Ian Sefchick – mastering
- Nick Scott – artwork, layout

== Charts ==
Chart performance for Night Network
Chart (2020)	Peak position
Scottish Albums (OCC)	18
UK Albums (OCC)	19
UK Independent Albums (OCC)	4
