= Squier Gary Jarman Signature Bass =

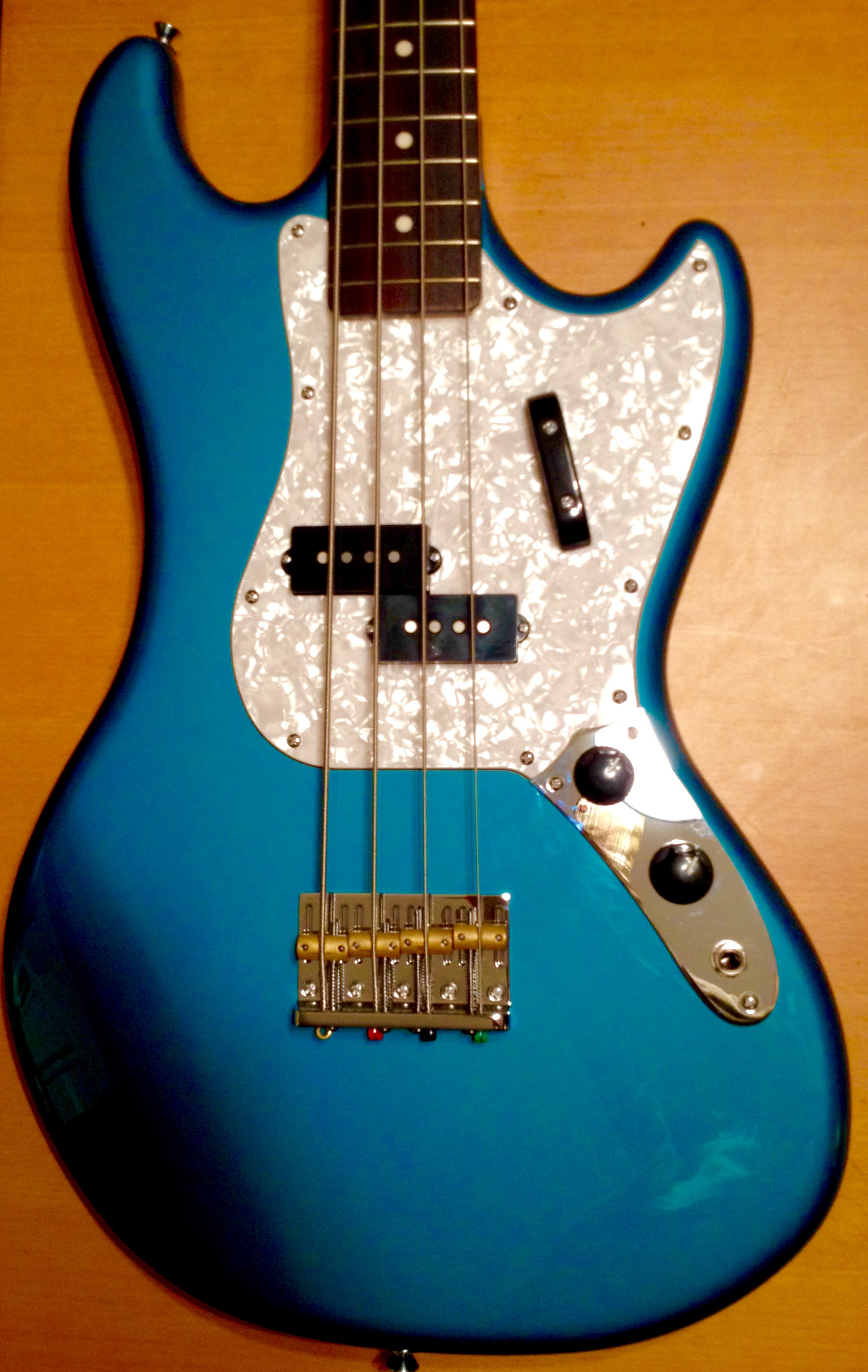
- Fender Squier Gary Jarman Signature Bass in Ocean Turquoise Metallic
- Manufacturer: Fender/Squier
- Period: 2016

Construction
- Body type: Solid
- Neck joint: Bolt-on

Woods
- Body: Alder
- Neck: Maple
- Fretboard: Rosewood

Hardware
- Bridge: Hi-mass with brass saddles
- Pickup(s): Vintage Precision style split-coil

Colors available
- Ocean Turquoise Metallic

The Gary Jarman Signature Bass is an electric bass guitar manufactured by Fender/Squier in 2016, designed by Gary Jarman of The Cribs. It was released in August 2016 alongside the Squier Ryan Jarman Signature Guitar 'Mus-Uar'.

Talking to Total Guitar, Jarman explained that the bass was an amalgamation of his favorite Fender models. Prior to the release of his signature instrument, Jarman had usually been seen using Fender Mustang Basses and Precision Basses. He claims the concept of his signature instrument was influenced by both these basses, as well as an obscure Fender design from the 1960s, the Bass V. The bass features a split coil humbucking pickup, hi-mass bridge, and an unusual 32" scale length neck- a compromise between the short scale Mustang Bass (30"), and the Precision (34") “I use a P-Bass, but before that I always used Mustangs and I wanted to find a balance between the two [scale-lengths], so we made a medium-scale neck.” he explained. The bass also features a headstock shape which dates back to the original Precision Bass design from the early 1950s.

The bass is available in one colour, Ocean Turquoise Metallic.

Other professionals seen using this bass include Nirvana bassist Krist Novoselic.
