= We Share the Same Skies =

Single by The Cribs

from the album Ignore the Ignorant
- B-side: "City of Bugs" (live in London)
- Released: 6 November 2009
- Recorded: Los Angeles, California
- Genre: Indie rock; alternative rock; new wave
- Length: 3:15
- Label: Wichita Recordings (UK, Ireland)
- Songwriters: Gary Jarman; Ross Jarman; Ryan Jarman; Johnny Marr
- Producer: Nick Launay

The Cribs singles chronology
"Cheat on Me" (2009)	"We Share the Same Skies" (2009)	"So Hot Now / Separate" (2010)

"We Share the Same Skies" is the second and final single taken from the fourth studio album by British indie rock band the Cribs. The song provided listeners with two of the stand out songs from the four-piece incarnation of the band, with the Smiths and Modest Mouse guitarist Johnny Marr an addition the year previous, which found release on fourth LP Ignore the Ignorant in September 2009.

Gary Jarman features on hammond organ during the song. Recorded and mixed at Seedy Underbelly Studio in Laurel Canyon, Los Angeles, California with producer Nick Launay, the song received additional treatment at British Grove Studio, London, United Kingdom. It is reported Australian indie rock band Last Dinosaurs were influenced by the song when writing Purist off their second studio album Wellness.

An instrumental version featured heavily on Match of the Day 2 for several years, usually played in-between highlights from the previous day's games - or as part of the Goal of the Month compilation.

== Physical release ==
The song received a physical release on blue coloured seven-inch vinyl in addition to digital download. Frequent band collaborator Nick Scott designed the sleeve. The band released an accompanying video with the song, yet failed to make a mark on the British singles chart due to BPI regulations. The vinyl received the catalogue number 'WEBB236S'.

== "City of Bugs" ==
The flip-side features a rendition of "City of Bugs" performed for a MTV session to promote the album in September 2009, recorded by Chris Leckie. Live collaborator Jim Spencer mixed the take whereas Greg Moore finished the recording off at Masterpiece, London.

== Track listing ==
All tracks are written by Gary Jarman, Ross Jarman, Ryan Jarman and Johnny Marr.

No.	Title	Length
1.	"We Share the Same Skies"	3:15
2.	"City of Bugs" (live in London)	6:44
