= Housewife (The Cribs song) =

Single by The Cribs
- B-side: "Etching"
- Released: 10 August 2010
- Recorded: West Heath Studios, London in 2010
- Genre: Indie rock, alternative rock
- Length: 4:07
- Label: (United Kingdom) (Republic of Ireland) Wichita Recordings (United States) (Canada) Warner Bros. Records (Australia) (New Zealand) Shock (Europe) Cooperative Music (Japan) Hostess
- Songwriters: Jarman, Jarman, Jarman and Marr
- Producers: Ryan Jarman, Edwyn Collins

The Cribs singles chronology
"So Hot Now / Separate" (2010)	"Housewife" (2010)	"Chi-Town" (2012)

"Housewife" arrived in August 2010 as a one-off release, and their fourth single overall, by the four-piece incarnation of British indie rock band The Cribs. On 9 August 2010, BBC Radio 1 DJ Zane Lowe announced during his show that he would play a brand new song that night, something previously hinted at on the official band website several days previously. The release took fans and critics by surprise due to the secretive nature of the release.

== Physical release ==
Recorded at West Heath Studios, London by Ryan with assistance from frequent collaborator Edwyn Collins, John O'Mahony mixed the song at Sunset Sound Factory, Hollywood, California. The vinyl received the catalogue number 'WEBB271S'. A traditional set-up for the band, except with Ryan providing work on organ.

== Etching and poem ==
Unlike the majority of Cribs releases, the 7" vinyl featured no b-side. Instead, an etching appeared with the words 'SCAM', in addition to a message on the run-out groove stating 'insert me into your computer for additional content'. A poem, containing allusions to the song, appears on the back cover. The cover art featured Ryan and Gary dressed as the title of the single suggests, shot by Pat Graham, with the sleeve designed by Nick Scott, receiving assistance by Owen Richards, Corrado and Nell Frizzell.

== Track listing ==
All tracks are written by Gary Jarman, Ross Jarman, Ryan Jarman and Johnny Marr.

No.	Title	Length
1.	"Housewife"	4:07
