= Cheat on Me (The Cribs song) =

Single by The Cribs

from the album Ignore the Ignorant
- B-side: "Curse This English Rain"; "So Hot Now"; "Cheat on Me" (live in Manchester); "We Were Aborted" (live in Manchester)
- Released: 31 August 2009
- Recorded: Los Angeles, California
- Genre: Indie rock; alternative rock
- Length: 3:24
- Label: Wichita Recordings (UK, Ireland)
- Songwriter(s): Gary Jarman; Ross Jarman; Ryan Jarman; Johnny Marr
- Producer(s): Nick Launay

The Cribs singles chronology
| "I'm a Realist" (2008) | "Cheat on Me" (2009) | "We Share the Same Skies" (2009) |

"Cheat on Me" arrived in August 2009 as the first single taken from the fourth studio album by British indie rock band the Cribs. The song provided listeners with the first batch of new material from the four-piece incarnation of the band, with the Smiths and Modest Mouse guitarist Johnny Marr an addition the year previous, later finding release on fourth LP Ignore the Ignorant in September 2009.

Recorded and mixed at Seedy Underbelly Studio in Laurel Canyon, Los Angeles, California with producer Nick Launay, the song received additional treatment at British Grove Studio, London, United Kingdom.

== Physical release ==
The song received a physical release in numerous forms, through two seven-inch records and a CD single, as well as digital download. Frequent band collaborator Nick Scott designed the sleeve, whereas Autumn de Wilde provided band photography for one of the releases. The first vinyl included a band photograph as an A3 poster, with the second a clear-coloured release. Catalogue numbers 'WEBB221S', 'WEBB221SX' and 'WEBB221SCD'.

== B-sides ==
"Curse This English Rain" and "So Hot Now", the CD single and seven inch vinyl one B-sides, came from the same sessions as the rest of the album, with additional recording completed at Mastan Music, Portland, Oregon by Jeremy Wilson. "So Hot Now" went on to feature as a split single with Portland band the Thermals on Kill Rock Stars in March 2010, with Gary Jarman on guitar and Ryan Jarman on bass duties. The live versions of "Cheat on Me" and "We Were Aborted" come from Live at the Ritz, an album recorded in Manchester on 5 and 6 February 2009 by Jim Spencer.

== Miscellaneous ==
The band released an accompanying video with the song, reaching number eighty on the British singles chart.

== Track listing ==
All tracks are written by Gary Jarman, Ross Jarman, Ryan Jarman and Johnny Marr

CD single
| No. | Title | Length |
|---|---|---|
| 1. | "Cheat on Me" | 3:24 |
| 2. | "Curse This English Rain" | 3:20 |

7-inch single (version 1)
| No. | Title | Length |
|---|---|---|
| 1. | "Cheat on Me" | 3:24 |
| 2. | "So Hot Now" | 3:18 |

7-inch single (version 2)
| No. | Title | Length |
|---|---|---|
| 1. | "Cheat on Me" (live in Manchester) | 3:33 |
| 2. | "We Were Aborted" (live in Manchester) | 3:10 |
