= The Cribs (album) =

Studio album by The Cribs
- Released: 8 March 2004
- Recorded: Toerag Studios, London
- Genres: Indie rock, garage rock, lo-fi
- Length: 35:40
- Labels: Wichita Recordings (United Kingdom); Wichita/Worlds Fair (United States); V2 (Europe, Japan); Festival Mushroom Records (Australia, New Zealand)
- Producers: Ed Deegan, Bobby Conn

The Cribs chronology
The Cribs (2004)	The New Fellas (2005)

Professional ratings
Review scores
Source	Rating
AllMusic	3.5/5 stars
NME	8/10 stars
Mojo	3.5/5 stars
Tiny Mix Tapes	2/5 stars
Fader	(positive)

The Cribs is the debut studio album by the British indie rock band The Cribs, released in 2004. It was recorded in 7 days in mid/late 2003 at London's Toe-Rag Studios, a vintage styled 8-track studio in the Hackney area. It was self-produced by the band with Ed Deegan engineering, all except track 9, "Tri'elle", which was culled from the band's original sessions at Fortress Studio with Chicago-based Avant-Garde musician Bobby Conn. In 2005, this record was awarded the prestigious American Society of Composers, Authors and Publishers (ASCAP) College Award. Previous winners have included Coldplay and Franz Ferdinand.

== Background ==
The band formed in 2001, and for the first few years of their existence, they played small gigs in local venues. After being signed by Wichita Recordings, the band released this album in 2004. It was supposed to be released in 2002 but the band had to wait 18 months for drummer Ross Jarman to turn 18, otherwise they would have to spend money they didn't have to rewrite their recording contract.

The majority of the album was recorded at the Toerag Studios in London, and was recorded and produced by Ed Deegan, although the ninth track on the album, "Tri'Elle", was produced by Bobby Conn and engineered by Gareth Parton at Fortress Studios. Conn also provided backing vocals on the track. The album has a mixture of garage rock and indie rock sounds and features Ryan Jarman on electric guitar and vocals, Gary Jarman on bass guitar and vocals, and Ross Jarman plays the drums. All other instruments on the record are played by the band members.

== Reissue ==
On 29 July 2022, The Cribs released reissues of their first three albums, the main reason for which was because the albums' vinyl editions had been out of print for some time. After regaining the rights and master tapes for the albums through the legal battle that caused the band's inactivity several years prior, they spent 2021 sifting through their archives for bonus material to include on the reissues. All three reissued albums entered the Top Ten of the midweek UK Albums Chart.

== Track listing ==
All tracks are written by Ryan Jarman, Gary Jarman and Ross Jarman except where noted.

No.	Title	Length
1.	"The Watch Trick"	2:09
2.	"You Were Always The One"	2:28
3.	"The Lights Went Out"	2:57
4.	"You & I"	2:44
5.	"Things You Should Be Knowing"	2:33
6.	"Another Number"	2:53
7.	"What About Me"	3:00
8.	"Learning How To Fight"	2:41
9.	"Tri'elle"	2:41
10.	"Baby Don't Sweat"	2:46
11.	"Direction"	3:33
12.	"Third Outing"	5:14

Definitive Edition Disc 2
No.	Title	Writer(s)	Length
1.	"Fevers And Seizures"		2:36
2.	"Feelin' It!"		3:45
3.	"Song From Practice 1"		4:02
4.	"Another Number" (Bobby Conn Session)		2:58
5.	"What About Me" (Bobby Conn Session)		3:07
6.	"Baby Don't Sweat" (Bobby Conn Session)		2:58
7.	"Third Outing" (Bobby Conn Session)		3:42
8.	"Another Number" (Original Demo)		3:08
9.	"On The Floor" (Original Demo)		4:26
10.	"You & I" (Original Demo)		2:55
11.	"Death To The Dead Bodies" (Original Demo)		3:05
12.	"Third Outing" (Original Demo)		3:32
13.	"Tri'elle" (Original Demo)		2:40
14.	"Feelin' It!" (Original Demo)		3:49
15.	"I Gotta Go To L.A." (Original Demo)		2:23
16.	"Song From Practice 1" (Original Demo)		4:10
17.	"Baby Don't Sweat" (Squirrel 7" Version)		2:54
18.	"What About Me" (Demo)		3:02
19.	"Run A Mile"		2:14
20.	"Will You Still Love Me Tomorrow"	Gerry Goffin; Carole King	2:25
21.	"Death To The Dead Bodies" (4-Track Demo)		3:08
22.	"Feelin' It!" (4-Track Demo)		3:55
23.	"Song From Practice 1" (4-Track Demo)		4:05

== Charts ==
2022 chart performance for The Cribs
Chart (2022)	Peak position
UK Albums (Official Charts)	23
