= Men's Needs =

Single by The Cribs

from the album Men's Needs, Women's Needs, Whatever
- B-side: "Fairer Sex"; "Tonight"; "I've Tried Everything" (acoustic)
- Released: 14 May 2007
- Recorded: Vancouver, British Columbia
- Genre: Indie rock; alternative rock
- Length: 3:15
- Label: Wichita Recordings; Warner Bros. Records; Shock; Cooperative Music; Hostess
- Songwriter(s): Jarman, Jarman and Jarman
- Producer(s): Alex Kapranos

The Cribs singles chronology
| "You're Gonna Lose Us" (2005) | "Men's Needs" (2007) | "Moving Pictures" (2007) |

"Men's Needs" was released in May 2007 as the first single taken from the third studio album by British indie rock band The Cribs. The song provided listeners with new material for the first time since December 2005, and later found release on third LP Men's Needs, Women's Needs, Whatever in May 2007. Recorded at the Warehouse Studio in Vancouver, British Columbia with Franz Ferdinand vocalist and guitarist Alex Kapranos, the song received additional treatment at Alchemy, London, United Kingdom.

== Physical release ==
The song received a physical release in numerous forms, through two seven inch records and a CD single, in addition to digital download. Frequent band collaborator Nick Scott designed the sleeve, whereas Bob Taylor provided band photography for the releases. The release featured the catalogue numbers 'WEBB124S', 'WEBB124SX' and 'WEBB124SCD'.

== B-sides ==
"Tonight", the seven-inch vinyl one B-side, came from the same sessions as the rest of the album, whereas "Fairer Sex", the CD single flip, found completion at Avatar Studios, New York City along with "Be Safe" and "Shoot the Poets". The acoustic version of "I've Tried Everything", the 7" vinyl two b-side, came from a Board of Trade Building session in Portland, Oregon, with Joe Plummer providing additional percussion duties.

== Chart position ==
The song reached number seventeen in the UK Singles Chart, the highest position to date for the band.

== Critical reception ==
The song featured at number three on the NME 'Songs of the Year 2007', named 'Single of the Year' by the Metro newspaper and finished in the 'Top 100 Songs of 2007' published by Rolling Stone in the United States. In 2009, NME also named "Men's Needs" as one of the 'Songs of the Decade', saying that this took them "from cult favourites to one of Britain's best loved bands". Furthermore, in October 2011, NME placed the song at number ninety-eight on a list '150 Best Tracks of the Past Fifteen Years'.

== Music video ==
Directed by Diane Martel, the video depicts the band playing "Men's Needs" in front of a yellow background. A nude woman (censored due to watershed restrictions) licks and kisses vocalist and guitarist Ryan, dances and trashes amplifiers, performs household tasks, punches the band members and interrupts proceedings. Near the middle of the video, she throws a knife at drummer Ross and severs his arm. Using Ross' severed arm she then cuts off Ryan's head, which she then holds in her arms during his guitar solo. Both have their limbs back on their bodies for the third verse. Oblivious to all these actions, the band plays on.

The graphic nature of the video led to a ban on MTV2 before the watershed due to Ofcom complaints about violence and nudity. Three versions of the video exist: the first censored version as described above, a second version that shows the woman wearing a leotard and a third uncensored version.

== Track listing ==
All tracks are written by Gary Jarman, Ross Jarman and Ryan Jarman

CD single
| No. | Title | Length |
|---|---|---|
| 1. | "Men's Needs" | 3:15 |
| 2. | "Fairer Sex" | 2:53 |

7" vinyl one
| No. | Title | Length |
|---|---|---|
| 1. | "Men's Needs" | 3:15 |
| 2. | "Tonight" | 2:42 |

7" vinyl two
| No. | Title | Length |
|---|---|---|
| 1. | "Men's Needs" | 3:15 |
| 2. | "I've Tried Everything (Acoustic)" | 2:58 |
