= Squier Ryan Jarman Signature Guitar =

Electric guitar

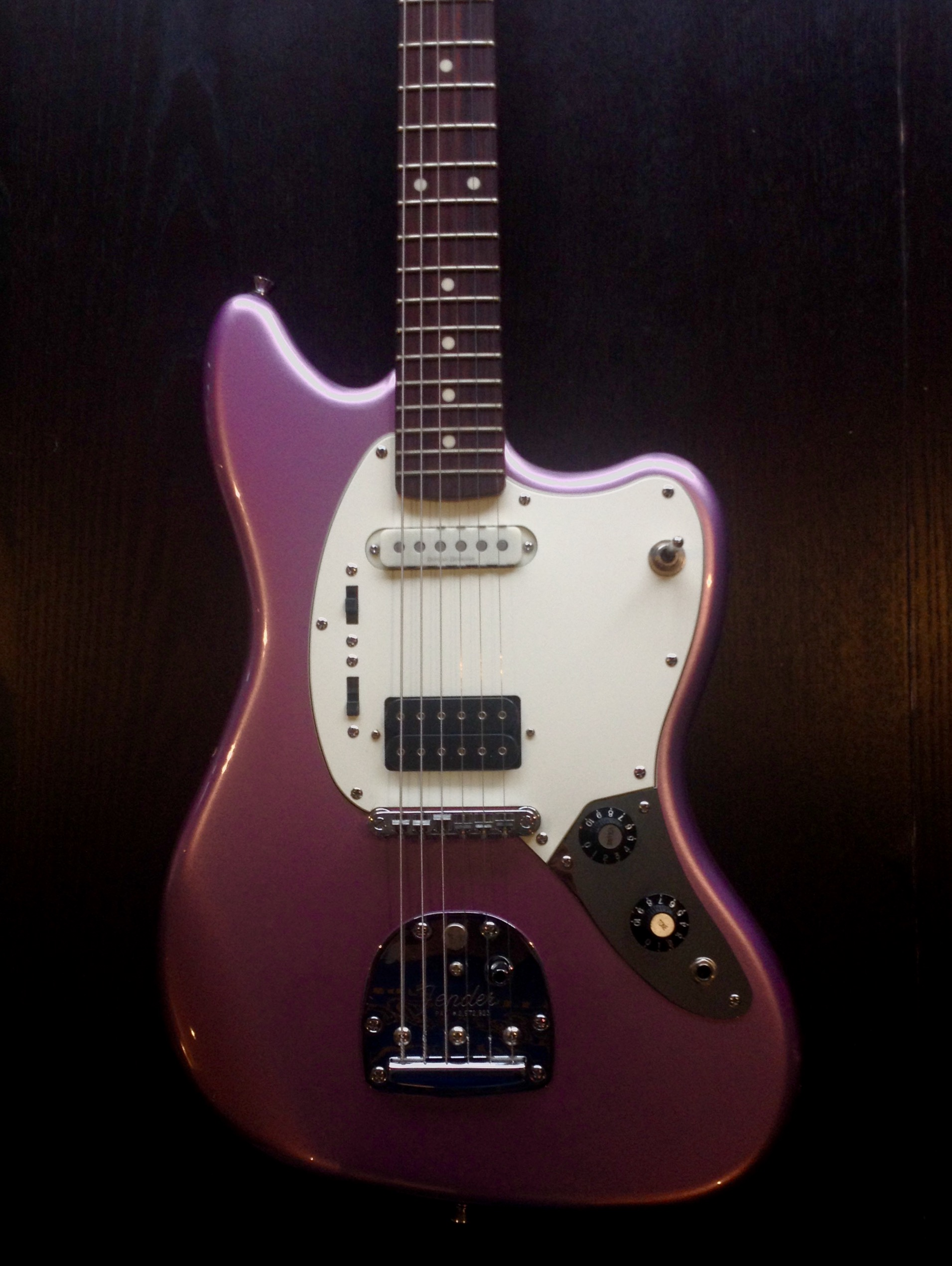
- Fender Squier Ryan Jarman Signature Guitar in Burgundy Mist Metallic
- Manufacturer: Fender/Squier
- Period: 2016

Construction
- Body type: Solid
- Neck joint: Bolt-on

Woods
- Body: Alder
- Neck: Maple
- Fretboard: Rosewood Slab

Hardware
- Bridge: Adjust-O-Matic with Fender Jaguar Tailpiece
- Pickup(s): Duncan-Designed Jaguar single-coil (neck), Hi-Output Humbucker (bridge)

Colors available
- Burgundy Mist Metallic

The Squier Ryan Jarman Signature Guitar is an electric guitar manufactured by the Fender/Squier company in August 2016. It was designed by Ryan Jarman of The Cribs as his signature model instrument.

== Design and concept ==
Speaking to NME in 2016, Jarman spoke of the guitars origins - "They asked us to do signature models a few years ago based on the Mustang and Precision Basses we were known for using, but we wanted to do something different and offer brand new models. We went to a party that they threw after we played Reading 2012 and I showed them my rough design and they were really enthused on it."

Combining elements of the Fender Mustang and Jaguar guitars, the Ryan Jarman Signature guitar has become more commonly known as the 'Mus-Uar'. Speaking to Total Guitar, Jarman explained that his influences behind the guitar design went back to his teenage years, and owning another Fender hybrid - the Kurt Cobain designed Jag-Stang. "I got the Jag-Stang as a teenager, and I used to spend ages drawing it, but I always thought the shape was a bit weird. I thought, I could do one that's like a 'Mus-Uar'. It turned out that the two body shapes that I'd cut together balanced perfectly".

== Features ==
The 'Mus-Uar' features a single coil Fender Jaguar pickup in the neck position, with a Hi-output Fender MP-H1F Modern Player Telecaster humbucker in the bridge. The bridge is an 'adjust-o-matic' style, with an authentic Fender Jaguar tailpiece, unusual for a Squier. From Total Guitar - “One of my personal hangups, is trying to make sure that a guitar sustains as much as possible. That definitely factored into the decisions on the bridge and tailpiece". It also features Fender Mustang-style switching, a large 1960s style matching painted headstock, and vintage style tuners. It was released to the public in one color (Burgundy Mist Metallic), although recent photos show Jarman with a Fiesta Red model, and more recently with one in Apple Green. Other players who have been seen using this guitar include The Lemonheads frontman Evan Dando and Brad from The Vamps.
