= The New Fellas =

Studio album by the Cribs
- Released: 20 June 2005
- Recorded: West Heath Studios, London
- Genres: Indie rock, post-punk revival, garage rock
- Length: 34:15
- Labels: Wichita Recordings, Wichita/Worlds Fair, V2, Revolution Records
- Producer: Edwyn Collins

The Cribs chronology
The Cribs (2004)	The New Fellas (2005)	Men's Needs, Women's Needs, Whatever (2007)

Professional ratings
Review scores
Source	Rating
Allmusic	4/5 stars
Drowned in Sound	8/10 stars
NME	8/10 stars
Pitchfork	(3.0/10)
Rolling Stone	3/5 stars

The New Fellas is the second album by the British indie rock band the Cribs, released in June 2005. It reached No. 20 on the UK album chart, staying on the chart for two weeks, and it placed at No. 11 in NME's "Albums of the Year" edition, 2005.

== Background ==
Having become more of a part of the music scene following the release of their debut album The Cribs, much of The New Fellas' lyrics deal with the band's disgust at the attitudes of other UK bands.

== Recording ==
The Cribs chose Edwyn Collins to produce The New Fellas because they were fans of his old band Orange Juice and because he shared their attitude towards the music industry.

== Reception ==
In its early reviews, the staff at AllMusic rated the album at three-and-a-half stars out of a possible five. However, after a review was written by Tim Sendra in 2023, the rating was raised to four stars.

In 2007, the song "Hey Scenesters!" was named one of the "Greatest Indie Anthems Ever" by music magazine NME.

In December 2009, Q Magazine chose it as one of their "Albums of the Century" in their year end issue.

In October 2015, The New Fellas was inducted into the DIY Hall of Fame.

== Reissue ==
On July 29, 2022, The Cribs released reissues of their first three albums, the main reason for which was because the albums' vinyl editions had been out of print for some time. After regaining the rights and master tapes for the albums through the legal battle that caused the band's inactivity several years prior, they spent 2021 sifting through their archives for bonus material to include on the reissues. All three reissued albums entered the Top Ten of the midweek UK Albums Chart.

== Accolades ==
Publication	Accolade	Year	Rank
Q	Albums of the Century	2009	98
NME	Albums of the Year	2005	11
NME	Tracks of the Year ('Hey Scenesters!')	2005	33
NME	Greatest Indie Anthems Ever ('Hey Scenesters!')	2007	42
DIY	Hall of Fame	2015	inducted

== Track listing ==
All tracks are written by Ryan Jarman, Gary Jarman and Ross Jarman except where noted.

No.	Title	Length
1.	"Hey Scenesters!"	3:11
2.	"I'm Alright Me"	2:42
3.	"Martell"	2:57
4.	"Mirror Kissers"	3:38
5.	"We Can No Longer Cheat You"	3:03
6.	"It Was Only Love"	3:22
7.	"The New Fellas"	3:01
8.	"Hello? Oh..."	2:38
9.	"The Wrong Way To Be"	3:48
10.	"Haunted"	2:31
11.	"Things Aren’t Gonna Change"	3:28

Definitive Edition Disc 2
No.	Title	Writer(s)	Producer(s)	Length
1.	"In The Room"		Edwyn Collins	3:01
2.	"Lost In The Crowd"			2:49
3.	"You're Gonna Lose Us"		Bernard Butler	2:38
4.	"To Jackson"			3:05
5.	"North Of England"			2:40
6.	"It Happened So Fast"		The Cribs	3:17
7.	"Happy's Just A State of Mind And A State Of Mind Is Just Electrical Impulses"			1:22
8.	"Saturday Night Facts Of Life"	David Christian		2:04
9.	"I'm Still Blaming You"			3:35
10.	"Advice From A Roving Artist"			3:25
11.	"I Was Her Man But I Done Her Wrong"			2:30
12.	"Modern Way"	Ricky Wilson; Andrew White; Simon Rix; Nick Baines; Nick Hodgson		3:41
13.	"I'm Alright Me" (Greenmount Demo)			2:39
14.	"Things Aren't Gonna Change" (Greenmount Demo)			3:49
15.	"Martell" (Demo)			3:06
16.	"We Can No Longer Cheat You" (Demo)			3:15
17.	"It Was Only Love" (Demo)			3:23
18.	"The New Fellas" (Demo)			3:05
19.	"Hello? Oh..." (Demo)			2:51
20.	"The Wrong Way To Be" (Demo)			3:53
21.	"Things Aren't Gonna Change" (Demo)			3:08
22.	"You're Gonna Lose Us" (Demo)			2:55

== Charts ==
2005 chart performance for The New Fellas
Chart (2005)	Peak position
Scottish Albums (Official Charts)	84
UK Albums (Official Charts)	78

2022 chart performance for The New Fellas
Chart (2022)	Peak position
Scottish Albums (Official Charts)	4
UK Albums (Official Charts)	20
UK Independent Albums (Official Charts)	3

== Certifications ==
Certifications for The New Fellas
Region	Certification	Certified units/sales
United Kingdom (BPI)	Silver	60,000^{‡}
^{*} Sales figures based on certification alone.
