= The Research =

English indie pop band

Background information
- Origin: Wakefield, England
- Genres: Indie pop
- Years active: 2004–2008, 2023-present
- Labels: This Is Fake DIY Records (2008); At Large (2004–2007)
- Members: Russell "The Disaster" Searle; Georgia Lashbrook; Sarah Williams
- Past members: Johnny White

The Research are a band from Wakefield, England. The members are Russell "The Disaster" Searle (vocals, guitar, synthesizers), Georgia Lashbrook (bass, vocals, harmonica), and Sarah Williams (drums, vocals). Their songs – typically about themes of love, loss and fear – are notable for their plaintive lyrics and vocal harmonies.

In February 2006 they released their debut album, Breaking Up, via At Large Recordings, a subsidiary of EMI. Following the album's release, the band parted company with At Large, and signed to This Is Fake DIY Records, with whom they released their second album. The Old Terminal, and its accompanying single "I Think She's the One I Love", were released in autumn 2008.

In the time between the end of the band's promotion of their debut album and the announcement that they had left EMI, the band's MySpace blog detailed the recording of a second album in various places including Malmö, Sweden, where the band reportedly worked with Cardigans producer Per Sunding. The band also announced that they had recruited a lead guitarist named Johnny White and that Searle had moved from playing a keyboard live to playing guitar. The band played several concerts in this configuration before White left the band and was not replaced.

In March 2008, after a period of seeming inactivity, the band's MySpace was revamped, with several new songs and a seemingly handwritten announcement by Searle detailing the current status of the band, their departure from EMI and their plans for the future. This was followed by several blog posts clarifying aspects of the note and answering fans' queries.

"I Would Like to Be Forgiven", one of the tracks on The Old Terminal, is a collaboration with Gary Jarman of fellow Wakefield band the Cribs.

The band split up in 2008. However, they reunited for a one-off performance on June 10, 2023, in honour of the final edition of Wakefield's Long Division Festival. They performed another concert on January 12, 2024, at the Lexington in London.

== Discography ==
=== Singles ===
- "She's Not Leaving" (2004) - UK #73
- "C'mon Chameleon" / "I Love You But..." (2005) - UK #63
- "The Way You Used to Smile" (2005)- UK #66
- "Lonely Hearts Still Beat the Same" / "All These Feelings" (2006)
- "The Hard Times" (2006)
- "For Christmas I Got Pityriasis Rosea" (2007, download only)
- "I Think She's the One I Love" (2008)
- "Back to the Real World" / "Feels Like the First Time" (2023)

=== Albums ===
- Breaking Up (2006)
- The Old Terminal (2008)
