= Come On, Be a No-One =

Single by the Cribs

from the album In the Belly of the Brazen Bull
- B-side: "Don't Believe in Me"
- Released: 23 April 2012
- Recorded: 2011: Cassadaga, New York, US; London, UK
- Genre: Alternative rock; noise rock
- Length: 2:37
- Label: Wichita Recordings
- Songwriters: Gary Jarman; Ross Jarman; Ryan Jarman
- Producer: David Fridmann

The Cribs singles chronology
"Chi-Town" (2012)	"Come On, Be a No-One" (2012)	"Glitters Like Gold" (2012)

"Come On, Be a No-One" arrived in April 2012 as the second release and first official single taken from the fifth studio album by British indie rock band the Cribs, In the Belly of the Brazen Bull. The song gained place within the UK top ten albums chart.

Recorded and mixed at Tarbox Road Studios, Cassadaga, New York with producer David Fridmann, the song received mastering treatment in Sterling Sound, New York City from Greg Calbi.

== Physical release ==
Nick Scott designed the sleeve, whereas the cover image contains detail from the piece "Lessons of Our Forefathers" by Portland, Oregon-based artist Sean Croghan. The vinyl received release in red, continuing the theme of "Chi-Town" in purple and later the respective colour mentioned in "Glitters Like Gold", and was given the catalogue number 'WEBB337S'.

== "Don't Believe in Me" ==
"Don't Believe in Me", the 7-inch single B-side was initially recorded at the same time as "Housewife", when Johnny Marr still played with the band in 2010, the song went unused for more than a year. Several parties helped resurrect the song: Ryan Jarman produced the original track in 2010 with engineering by Sebastian Lewsley at West Heath Studios in London. Furthermore, Gary Jarman undertook additional recording at Tartan Hell, Portland in 2012. Finally, Woodie Taylor, drummer for Comet Gain and previously Morrissey, mixed the song in Milou Studios. The song reached completion though Chris Potter at Electric Mastering.

== Track listing ==
All tracks are written by Gary Jarman, Ross Jarman and Ryan Jarman.

7-inch single & digital download
No.	Title	Length
1.	"Come On, Be a No-one"	2:37
2.	"Don't Believe in Me"	3:45
