= Hey Scenesters! =

Single by The Cribs

from the album The New Fellas
- B-side: "To Jackson, North of England, You're Gonna Lose Us"
- Released: 18 April 2005
- Recorded: 2005
- Genre: Post-punk revival
- Length: 3:11
- Label: Wichita Recordings
- Songwriter(s): Ryan Jarman; Ross Jarman; Gary Jarman
- Producer(s): Edwyn Collins

The Cribs singles chronology
"What About Me" (2004)	"Hey Scenesters!" (2005)	"Mirror Kissers" (2005)

"Hey Scenesters!" was the first single from English post-punk revival band The Cribs second album The New Fellas. The single charted at number 27 in April 2005, becoming their first Top 40 single. In its year of release, the song was voted the 3rd best song of the year by the NME, Track of the Year by the Metro newspaper, and finished in the top 100 tracks of the year in Rolling Stone in the USA. In May 2007, the song placed 42nd in the influential music paper NME's "Top Indie Anthems of All Time", one of the only contemporary bands included in the list. Drummer Ross Jarman told Mojo magazine that this song was fueled by the band's experiences: "playing Brixton Windmill, full of kids who were only there because they thought it made them look cool."

== Critical reception ==
Alex Wisgard of Drowned in Sound proclaimed "Hey Scenesters! kicks the album off in suckerpunch style; the chorus spits in your face; an unearthly mix of The Libertines and Pavement, made all the more abrasive by Edwyn Collins' sandpaper-raw production".
