= Chi-Town (song) =

Single by The Cribs

from the album In the Belly of the Brazen Bull
- B-side: "Better Than Me"
- Released: 14 February 2012
- Recorded: Chicago, US
- Genre: Indie rock; alternative rock
- Length: 3:20
- Label: Wichita Recordings
- Songwriters: Gary Jarman; Ross Jarman; Ryan Jarman

The Cribs singles chronology
"Housewife" (2010)	"Chi-Town" (2012)	"Come On, Be a No-One" (2012)

"Chi-Town" is the first single taken from the fifth studio album by British indie rock band the Cribs, released in February 2012. The song was the band's first new material since "Housewife" in August 2010, and later found release on fifth LP In the Belly of the Brazen Bull in May 2012.

BBC Radio 1 DJ Zane Lowe premiered the track, playing it three times on his show one evening, and "Chi-Town" was immediately released as a free digital download on a variety of music news websites. Recorded and mixed at Electrical Audio studio, Chicago with engineer Steve Albini, the song received mastering treatment in Sterling Sound, New York City from Greg Calbi.

== Physical release ==
Frequent band collaborator Nick Scott designed the sleeve, whereas Gary Jarman provided the cover image of the lo-fi Chicago skyline. The vinyl received release in purple, continuing a theme dating back to their debut of using a variety of colours, and gained the catalogue number 'WEBB344S'. The liner notes also indicate "this seven inch was given away with the album, In the Belly of the Brazen Bull".

== "Better Than Me" ==
"Better Than Me", the 7-inch single B-side, initially found release as a 'treat' for those who pre-ordered the new LP as an "instant gratification track". Produced and engineered at Greenmount Studios, Leeds by Lee Smith and fellow Wakefield resident Jamie Lockhart, the song reached completion through Chris Potter at Electric Mastering, London.

== Miscellaneous ==
The band opted not to release an accompanying video with the song. Furthermore, "Chi-Town" failed to make a mark on the British singles chart due to BPI rules and regulations associated with free digital downloads.

Chicago, Illinois, where the song was recorded at "Electrical Audio", is sometimes known as Chi-Town, which is likely the reason the song is named as such.

== Track listing ==
All tracks are written by Gary Jarman, Ross Jarman and Ryan Jarman.

7-inch single & digital download
No.	Title	Length
1.	"Chi-Town"	3:20
2.	"Better Than Me"	3:01
