= Ignore the Ignorant =

Studio album by The Cribs
- Released: 7 September 2009
- Recorded: Seedy Underbelly Studio, Laurel Canyon, Los Angeles
- Genre: Indie rock, alternative rock
- Length: 47:48
- Label: (United Kingdom) (Republic of Ireland) Wichita Recordings (United States) (Canada) Warner Bros. Records (Australia) (New Zealand) Shock (Europe) Cooperative Music (Japan) Hostess
- Producer: Nick Launay

The Cribs chronology
Men's Needs, Women's Needs, Whatever (2007)	Ignore the Ignorant (2009)	In the Belly of the Brazen Bull (2012)

Singles from Ignore the Ignorant
- 1. "Cheat on Me" Released: 31 August 2009; 2. "We Share the Same Skies" Released: 6 November 2009

Ignore the Ignorant is the fourth studio album by British indie rock band The Cribs, released via Wichita Recordings on 7 September 2009, following the release of first single 'Cheat on Me' on 31 August. Warner Bros. Records released the album one day later on 8 September in North America as a digital download, then given a physical outlet later in the year on 10 November.

== Background ==
After a chance meeting with Johnny Marr in Portland, OR, the band invited the guitarist to join as a touring member in February 2008, with the prospect of recording together proposed for the future. The remainder of the year found the band writing new material in Portland, OR, Manchester and Wakefield, with a short UK tour that took place at the ABC, Glasgow, the Manchester Ritz for two nights, St. George's Hall, Bradford and Heaven, London used to roadtest some of the new songs before recording commenced.

== Recording ==
Sessions for the album began first with rehearsal/pre-production in January 2009 at a rented, rural barn in Oregon City, OR. However, the band soon relocated to record the majority of the LP at Seedy Underbelly Studios, Laurel Canyon, Los Angeles with producer Nick Launay throughout spring and summer 2009. The main body of the recording found completion in three separate weeks, with another seven-day stretch spent on overdubs and mixing. Launay oversaw the mixing process too, with assistance from Atom and engineers Nick Veitbakk and Erick Phillips. Additional mixing took place at British Grove Studios, London, with Tim Young mastering the final recordings at Metropolis.

== Composition ==
As per previous Cribs releases, Nick Scott provided the cover and inlay artwork, assisted on this occasion by Nell Frizzell amongst others. The four-piece line-up of the band included Gary on vocals and bass, Ross on drums and percussion, Ryan on vocals and guitar and Johnny on guitar and backing vocals. However, some songs featured additional instrumentation. Gary played Hammond organ on ‘We Share the Same Skies’ and 'Victim of Mass Production'. For 'Save Your Secrets', Gary played guitar and kalimba piano, with Ryan on baritone, and in turn, Gary takes on the latter instrument and mellotron for 'Stick to Yr Guns' whereas Ryan features on violin and additional mellotron.

== Release and promotion ==
Initially, opening track 'We Were Aborted' received a debut on the Radio 6 Steve Lamacq show, becoming available for free download that day. Two singles found release to promote the album. The first single arrived on 31 August 2009 with 'Cheat on Me', while 6 November brought 'We Share the Same Skies'.

The album was released the same week as all of the deluxe Beatles re-issues, Ignore the Ignorant outsold all but two of them in the first week. The band described this in various interviews at the time as "surreal".

== Critical reception ==
Professional ratings
Aggregate scores
Source	Rating
Metacritic	75/100
Review scores
Source	Rating
Allmusic	link
BBC	(positive) link
Drowned in Sound	(5/10) link
The Fly	link
musicOMH	link
Q	4/5 stars
Mojo	4/5 stars
Uncut	4/5 stars
The Guardian	link
NME	link
Pitchfork Media	(7.0/10) link

Ignore the Ignorant has received generally favourable reviews from music critics. At Metacritic, which assigns a normalised rating out of 100 to reviews from mainstream critics, the album received an average score of 75 based on 17 reviews.

Robert Earle of Stereola gave the album 9 out of 10, describing Ignore the Ignorant as "a masterpiece from start to finish."

In December 2009, Mojo magazine placed the album at number 11 in their 'Albums of the Year' chart, The Fly ranked it at 7 and NME ranked it at 30. In Japan, Crossbeat magazine placed it at 8 in their 'Albums of 2009' list, whilst Music Magazine ranked it at number 1.

== Accolades ==
Publication	Accolade	Year	Rank
Mojo	Albums of the Year	2009	11
NME	Albums of the year	2009	30
The Fly	Albums of the year	2009	7

== The Roses Edition ==
A special, deluxe box set edition of the record, nicknamed The Roses Edition, found release in areas local to the band. Originally, The Roses Edition was only available from record stores in Yorkshire, Lancashire and Oregon. However, due to demand, many record stores stocked this version of the album. The box contains Ignore the Ignorant, a live CD of the band performing in February, Live at the Ritz, Manchester, a DVD documentary of the recording of the album, Secrets Saved, and a silent film titled The Serpent and the Peach, recorded predominantly on a hand-held camera by Ryan.

== Track listing ==
All tracks are written by Gary Jarman, Ross Jarman, Ryan Jarman and Johnny Marr.

No.	Title	Length
1.	"We Were Aborted"	3:09
2.	"Cheat On Me"	3:24
3.	"We Share The Same Skies"	3:15
4.	"City of Bugs"	6:22
5.	"Hari Kari"	3:44
6.	"Last Year's Snow"	3:35
7.	"Emasculate Me"	3:35
8.	"Ignore The Ignorant"	3:18
9.	"Save Your Secrets"	4:29
10.	"Nothing"	3:41
11.	"Victim Of Mass Production"	4:08
12.	"Stick To Yr Guns"	5:08

iTunes bonus track
No.	Title	Length
13.	"Is Anybody There?"	3:08

== Charts ==
Chart (2009)	Peak position
UK Albums Chart	8

== Certifications ==
Certifications for Ignore the Ignorant
Region	Certification	Certified units/sales
United Kingdom (BPI)	Silver	60,000^{*}
^{*} Sales figures based on certification alone.
