= For All My Sisters =

Studio album by The Cribs
- Released: 20 March 2015
- Recorded: October 2014
- Studio: Magic Shop, New York City
- Genre: Indie rock, punk, indie pop, power pop
- Label: Sonic Blew /Sony RED UK; Arts & Crafts; Hostess
- Producer: Ric Ocasek

The Cribs chronology
Payola, 2002 - 2012 (2013)	For All My Sisters (2015)	24-7 Rock Star Shit (2017)

Singles from For All My Sisters
- 1. "Burning For No One" Released: 23 March 2015; 2. "Different Angle" Released: 1 June 2015; 3. "Summer of Chances" Released: 23 October 2015

Professional ratings
Aggregate scores
Source	Rating
Metacritic	74/100
Review scores
Source	Rating
NME	8/10 stars
AllMusic	4/5 stars
Drowned in Sound	8/10 stars
MusicOMH	4/5 stars
The Guardian	4/5 stars
Pitchfork Media	(6.7/10)
DIY	8/10 stars
The Line Of Best Fit	8.5/10 stars
PopMatters	6/10 stars

For All My Sisters is the sixth studio album by English band The Cribs. It was released in Germany on 20 March 2015, in the UK on 23 March and in North America on 24 March. The Cribs announced the album title and track-listing on 19 January 2015, along with the teaser track "An Ivory Hand". The album was recorded in New York with producer Ric Ocasek - the last album he produced before his death in 2019. This is the first Cribs album to not be released by their longtime label Wichita Recordings, as the group signed a deal with Sony RED UK to release recordings under their own label, Sonic Blew.

The first single released from the album was "Burning For No One", on 23 March 2015.

The album entered the UK midweek album chart at number 7 eventually charting at number 9 when the UK Albums Chart was announced on Sunday 29 March 2015. For All My Sisters is The Cribs' third top 10 album in a row.

== Critical response ==
The album was broadly well received by critics upon release. Writing for the NME, Mark Beaumont called it "delirious, damaged indie-punk greatness." He applauded the band's "real sense of striving to make ‘For All My Sisters’ a one-album greatest hits," and gave it four stars out of five. The Guardian praised the band's "gleefully ramshackle sound towards poppier parameters." They also awarded the record four stars. The Line of Best Fit were perhaps most effusive of For All My Sisters calling it "the year’s most glorious pop album." They were fulsome in their praise of The Cribs calling them "the outstanding British band of the past decade or so." They awarded the album an 8.5/10. Pitchfork were perhaps the only major music publication to be less than enthused by the album. They awarded it a score of 6.7 declaring it a "scruffy, buzzy and very hooky guitar album that doesn’t quite scan as "punk" or "indie.""

== Accolades ==
Publication	Accolade	Year	Rank
NME	NME'S Albums of the Year 2015	2015	45

== Charts ==
Chart (2015)	Peak position
UK Albums Chart	9

== Track listing ==
No.	Title	Length
1.	"Finally Free"	3:39
2.	"Different Angle"	3:38
3.	"Burning For No One"	3:14
4.	"Mr. Wrong"	2:58
5.	"An Ivory Hand"	3:56
6.	"Simple Story"	3:21
7.	"City Storms"	3:54
8.	"Pacific Time"	4:25
9.	"Summer Of Chances"	3:31
10.	"Diamond Girl"	3:17
11.	"Spring On Broadway"	3:50
12.	"Pink Snow"	7:13

iTunes bonus track Pre-Orders Only
No.	Title	Length
13.	"I See Your Pictures Every Day"	3:08
14.	"Cowlily"	4:32

iTunes/Amazon bonus track - Deluxe Edition Only
No.	Title	Length
13.	"I See Your Pictures Every Day"	3:08
14.	"Cowlily"	4:32
15.	"Orange Star Rattle"	4:03
16.	"Wish I Knew You In the 90's"	3:05
17.	"Regina, Don't Get Lost"	4:10

== Personnel ==
- Gary Jarman – vocals, bass, guitar
- Ryan Jarman – vocals, guitar
- Ross Jarman – drums, percussion
- Ric Ocasek – Record producer
- Sam Bell – co-Record producer
- Kabir Hermon – assistant engineer
- John O'Mahony – mixing engineer
- James Sandom – manager
- Ali Tant – product manager
- Pieter M. van Hattem – photographer
- Nick Scott – Art Direction
