= Squirrel Records =

UK-based record company

Squirrel Records is a UK-based record company based in Trumpington, Cambridgeshire, founded in 1994 by Simon Squirelle, former manager of the 1990s artists Candyman, The U-Krew, and the Funhouse presenter Pat Sharp.

Squirrel Records was declared bankrupt in 1997, following the 1996 unsuccessful re-release of the single "Walking on Sunshine" by Katrina and the Waves, which charted at number 53 in the UK Singles Chart, but reached the number 1 chart position for seven weeks in Turkmenistan.
