= In the Belly of the Brazen Bull =

Studio album by the Cribs
- Released: 7 May 2012
- Recorded: Tarbox Road, New York City; Abbey Road, London; Electrical Audio, Chicago
- Genres: Indie rock; punk rock; alternative rock
- Length: 47:25
- Labels: Wichita; Shock; PIAS; Hostess
- Producers: The Cribs, Dave Fridmann, Steve Albini

The Cribs chronology
Ignore the Ignorant (2009)	In the Belly of the Brazen Bull (2012)	Payola: 2002 – 2012 (2013)

Singles from In the Belly of the Brazen Bull
- 1. "Chi-Town" Released: 14 February 2012; 2. "Come On, Be a No-One" Released: 23 April 2012; 3. "Glitters Like Gold" Released: 22 July 2012; 4. "Anna" Released: 17 September 2012

Professional ratings
Aggregate scores
Source	Rating
Metacritic	70/100
Review scores
Source	Rating
NME	9/10 stars
Drowned in Sound	9/10 stars
AllMusic	4/5 stars
Pitchfork	7.3/10
Filter	8.5/10 stars
Consequence of Sound	4/5 stars

In the Belly of the Brazen Bull is the fifth studio album by British indie rock band The Cribs via Wichita Recordings. It was released on 7 May 2012. The band announced the record title and track-listing on 14 February 2012.

== Background ==
After the departure of guitarist Johnny Marr from the group was announced on 11 April 2011, the Cribs started working on writing the follow-up to Ignore the Ignorant as a three-piece. They played several headlining slots at UK festivals in summer 2011, as well as a show at Le Zenith, Paris with The Strokes, and a trip to Brazil for two shows in São Paulo. In December, the band headlined the Clockenflap festival in Hong Kong, debuting material from the new album for the first time.

== Recording ==
Recording for the album began in summer 2011 with Queen producer David Richards, at Mountain Studios, Montreux. However, the sessions were later shelved, for unspecified reasons. Instead, the majority of the LP was recorded at Tarbox Road Studios, Cassadaga with producer and engineer David Fridmann in autumn and winter 2011 and early 2012. Sessions at Electrical Audio studio, Chicago with engineer Steve Albini-produced "Chi-Town". A self-produced session at Abbey Road, London yielded the final four-song suite that closes the record. Sam Okell and Pete Hutchings engineered the Abbey Road sessions. The album was mastered at Sterling Sound, New York City by Greg Calbi.

== Critical response ==
In the Belly of the Brazen Bull has received generally favorable reviews from music critics. At Metacritic, which assigns a normalized rating out of 100 to reviews from mainstream critics, the album received an average score of 69 based on 26 reviews. The Guardian called it "a well-executed homage to lo-fi slacker rock" but warned "it's all a little too faithful to its template to be truly arresting." Pitchfork scored the album a 7.3, reserving particular praise for the lead single Chi-Town and its "ruthless efficiency."

== Personnel ==
The Cribs

- Gary Jarman – bass guitar, vocals
- Ryan Jarman – guitar, vocals
- Ross Jarman – percussion

Additional personnel

- Rodrigo Etguello – violin
- Tristan Beck – cello
- Dave Fridmann – Mellotron, Omnichord
- Greg Calbi – mastering
- Nick Scott – artwork, layout

== Singles ==
Four singles were released to promote the album. The band gave away the song "Chi-Town" as a free digital download on February 14, 2012. The first official single, "Come On, Be a No-One" was released on 23 April, with "Glitters Like Gold" following on 22 July. Both singles were backed with original b-sides. A collaboration with artist Martin Creed produced Work #1431, a video for "Anna".

== Accolades ==
Publication	Accolade	Year	Rank
The Guardian	The Guardian's Albums of the Year	2012	22
NME	Albums of the year	2012	8
DIY	Albums of the year	2012	3
The Fly	Albums of the year	2012	21

== Charts ==
Chart (2012)	Peak position
UK Albums Chart	9

== Track listing ==
All tracks are written by Gary Jarman, Ross Jarman and Ryan Jarman.

No.	Title	Length
1.	"Glitters Like Gold"	4:13
2.	"Come On, Be a No-One"	2:37
3.	"Jaded Youth"	3:52
4.	"'Anna'"	3:03
5.	"Confident Men"	3:01
6.	"Uptight"	4:12
7.	"Chi-Town"	3:20
8.	"Pure O"	4:16
9.	"Back to the Bolthole"	4:49
10.	"I Should Have Helped"	2:30
11.	"Stalagmites"	4:26
12.	"Like A Gift Giver"	1:17
13.	"Butterflies"	2:52
14.	"Arena Rock Encore with Full Cast"	2:40

All tracks are written by Ryan Jarman.

iTunes bonus track
No.	Title	Length
15.	"Eat Me"	3:20
