= You're Gonna Lose Us =

Single by The Cribs
- B-side: "The Wrong Way to Be" (Live at Reading); "I Was Her Man But I Done Her Wrong"
- Released: 5 December 2005
- Recorded: 2005
- Genre: Indie rock
- Length: 2:37
- Label: Wichita Recordings
- Songwriter(s): Gary Jarman, Ryan Jarman, Ross Jarman
- Producer(s): Bernard Butler

The Cribs singles chronology
"Martell" (2005)	"You're Gonna Lose Us" (2005)	"Men's Needs" (2007)

"You're Gonna Lose Us" is a non-album single from The Cribs, and was released on 5 December 2005, charting at #30 on the UK Singles Chart.

The track originally appeared as a b-side to "Hey Scenesters!" earlier in the year, before being reworked by Bernard Butler for its own stand-alone release.

== Music video ==
The promotional video recreates the infamous early '90s television programme The Word, featuring an appearance from its original host Terry Christian.
