= The Cribs =

English indie rock band

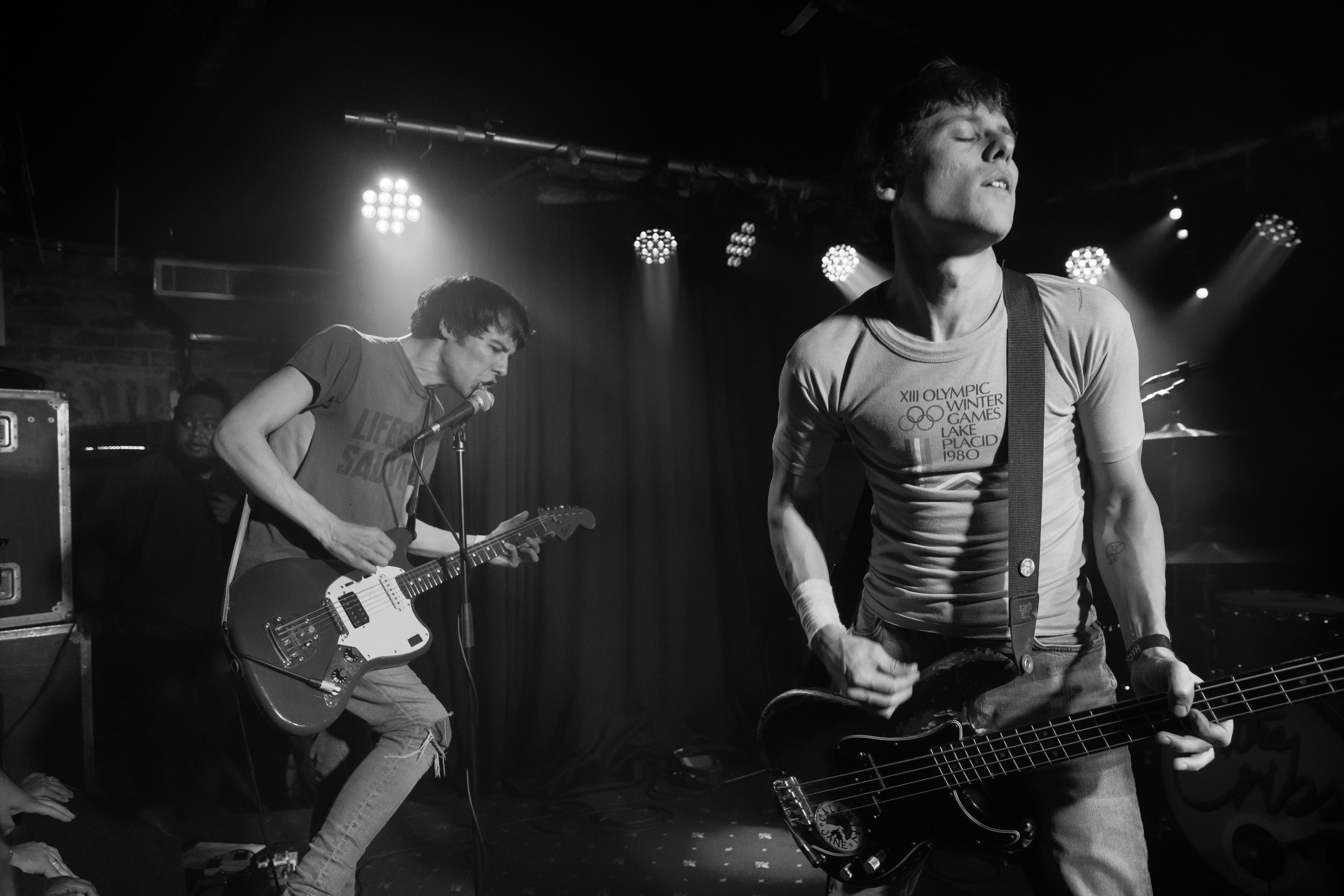
- The Cribs performing live in Sydney in 2018

Background information
- Origin: Wakefield, West Yorkshire, England
- Genres: Indie rock; alternative rock; punk rock; lo-fi
- Years active: 2001–2018, 2019–present
- Labels: Wichita; Warner Bros. Sony; PIAS; Kill Rock Stars others:Universal, V2, Arts & Crafts; Hostess
- Members: Gary Jarman; Ryan Jarman; Ross Jarman
- Past members: Johnny Marr
- Website: thecribs.com

The Cribs are a British indie rock band, formed in Wakefield, West Yorkshire, in 2001. The band consists of twins Gary and Ryan Jarman and their younger brother Ross Jarman. They were subsequently joined by ex-Smiths guitarist Johnny Marr, who was an official member of the group from 2008 until 2011.

The band, who first became active on the concert circuit in 2002, were initially tied to other like-minded UK bands of that time, most notably the Libertines, by a British music press that were looking for a 'British rearguard' to the wave of popular US alternative rock bands of the time. They had outgrown this tag by the time of the commercial success of their third LP. In 2008, Q magazine described the band as "the biggest cult band in the UK".

In 2012, the band's 10th anniversary year, they were honoured with the Spirit of Independence award at the annual Q Awards. Several months later, they received the Outstanding Contribution to Music award at the annual NME Awards. As of 2017, their last four albums have charted in the UK Top 10. In 2023, they were named one of the "20 Best Indie Rock Bands of All Time" by the Evening Standard, placing at #9.

== History ==
=== Formation and early years (2001–2003) ===
Twins Gary and Ryan Jarman - Gary being the older of the two by five minutes - and their younger brother Ross began performing together in 1989 when the twins were nine years old and Ross was five. The Cribs were formed in late 2001 as a recording project for the three brothers. Gary and Ryan enrolled in a music course at a local college, and used their student loan to buy a drum kit for Ross. Their poor attendance record and impending failure of the course threatened access to the campus' recording studio facilities. In order to maintain that access, they decided to book the studio under a different name; The Cribs was the first name that came to Ryan's mind.

After recording a demo and garnering label interest, the band started playing live around this time, at venues like the Brudenell Social Club in Leeds, and "squats and warehouse parties" with artists such as Calvin Johnston, Subway Sect, Herman Dune, and Ballboy. They also released a split 7-inch single on Leeds based garage/riot grrrl/punk label Squirrel Records during this period with former Shove/Boyskout member Jen Schande. Limited to 300 copies on blue vinyl the record is now a rarity that sells for upwards of $150 on eBay. According to Mojo magazine, 'On the strength of one demo, the rush to find the UK Strokes saw the three-piece fielding calls from major labels, pluggers and label managers' in 2002. After several high-profile support slots, the band signed to the fledgling independent label Wichita Recordings in 2003 "we thought (they) were great because they sounded a bit like Pavement and had a big hook. We went to see them at the Metro on Oxford Street and completely fell in love with them. They seemed like such an obvious pop band. Every song sounded like a single" – Mark Bowen, Wichita Recordings.

=== The Cribs (2004) ===
After signing with Wichita Recordings, the band began re-recording many of the songs from the original demo, as well as several new tracks for what would be their debut record. Sessions began in London with Chicago based avant-garde musician Bobby Conn producing, after the band had supported him on some UK dates and impressed him "They had this cassette demo they had recorded on a boom-box, I suggested overdubs, they were too kitchen-sink for overdubs. I tried handclaps, they were 'not sure about handclaps'. It was all 'Keep it real'" – Bobby Conn. Then sessions moved to Toe Rag Studios in Hackney with the band self-producing. The album was completed in 7 days, live to 8-track tape, with Ed Deegan engineering.

Released on 8 March 2004, the album found early supporters in the NME, who commented on its "supreme pop melodies", and referred to it as "lo-fi, hi fun" giving it an 8/10 review. Lo-fi would be a term that would follow the band around for the next few years, and something that became synonymous with the group. Again, from the NME in 2011: "Recorded in a week, it's the definition of indie lo-fi. But not willful indie lo-fi; the scratches, clangs and gawwumps all heard here are genuinely the product of the trio's shoestring methods rather than the usual contrived fuzz that bands spend ages poring over beaten up eight-tracks to achieve". Radio 1 DJ Steve Lamacq was also an early champion. Lois Wilson of Mojo magazine described the album in 2009 as "intelligent lyrics on a background of clipped guitars and tumbling drums, with nods to the Strokes, Beat Happening, and C86's inept charm" Three singles were released from the album – the limited edition 7-inch only "Another Number"/"Baby Don't Sweat" in November 2003, followed by first single proper "You Were Always the One", which climbed to No. 2 in the indie charts. "What About Me" was the third and final single from the album, again making the indie top 10. The Cribs toured extensively throughout 2004 and into 2005, both as headliners as well as supporting artists like old friend Bobby Conn, Death Cab for Cutie and the Libertines. Over the campaign they toured the UK and Ireland, Europe, Japan, and the United States, as well as several significant international festival appearances such as Reading and Leeds Festivals, Summersonic, T in the Park and Pukkelpop amongst others. Though only a moderate underground success at the time "Another Number" has gone on to become one of the band's most enduring 'hits' – seldom being left off the set-list and usually accompanied by a full crowd sing-along of the signature, repeated guitar riff.

=== The New Fellas (2005–2006) ===
After concluding touring duties for the first record, the band were starting to write the follow-up. The Cribs decided they still wanted to tour and took to posting their phone numbers and email addresses on the internet, professing to play anywhere for fuel money and a crate of beer. This DIY approach is something the band and label now feel was a key factor in their success, as it helped nurture a fanbase.

The New Fellas, the band's second album release, was recorded with Edwyn Collins, the singer-songwriter and guitarist from Glasgow's influential Orange Juice in London at his own West Heath Studios. Again, it was a comparatively unpolished record sonically, as both the producer Collins and the band themselves were achieving sounds similar to those heard on the Orange Juice records. This was, however, the intention and the reason the band and producer were put together. "They had definite ideas what they wanted the record to sound like...They had this work ethic, there was nothing spoiled about them – they were proper indie; everything done on a shoe-string and they just got on with it....they were tremendous" – Edwyn Collins. One song, "Haunted", was even recorded on Scarborough beach on a whim, after hearing a Steve Martin ukulele duet recorded on a beach.

The first release from the record was the single "Hey Scenesters!" on 18 April 2005. It reached no. 27 in the UK charts, and started their run of 7 consecutive top 40 singles. The album followed on 20 June 2005 although it had leaked onto the internet several months prior to the official release date, hampering its first week sales. The record has however, gone on to be certified Silver by the BPI, and in a recent poll held by the NME was proved to be the overall fans favourite record. The other singles released from the record were "Mirror Kissers", "Martell", and non-album track "You're Gonna Lose Us" (produced by Bernard Butler), which was paired with "The Wrong Way To Be" as a AA side. The extensive New Fellas world tour took in several UK tours, Europe, United States, Canada, Japan, Australia, Scandinavia, and their first trip to Iceland. They appeared at numerous festivals at this time, including an appearance on the main stage at Reading and Leeds Festivals (becoming the first band to ever progress through all three stages in consecutive years), headlining the tent at T in the Park, Fuji Rock festival in Japan as well as an extensive US arena tour with Death Cab for Cutie and Franz Ferdinand. A European tour during this period with ex Pavement man Stephen Malkmus and the Jicks would introduce Gary to his future wife Joanna Bolme.

Shortly before their appearance at the Fuji Rock festival, the Cribs released a Japan-only mini album called Arigato Cockers, made up of B-sides and rarities from both the first and second albums.

In their year-end issue, the NME made The New Fellas the No. 11 album of the year, and Hey Scenesters a single of the year.

=== Men's Needs, Women's Needs, Whatever (2007–2008) ===
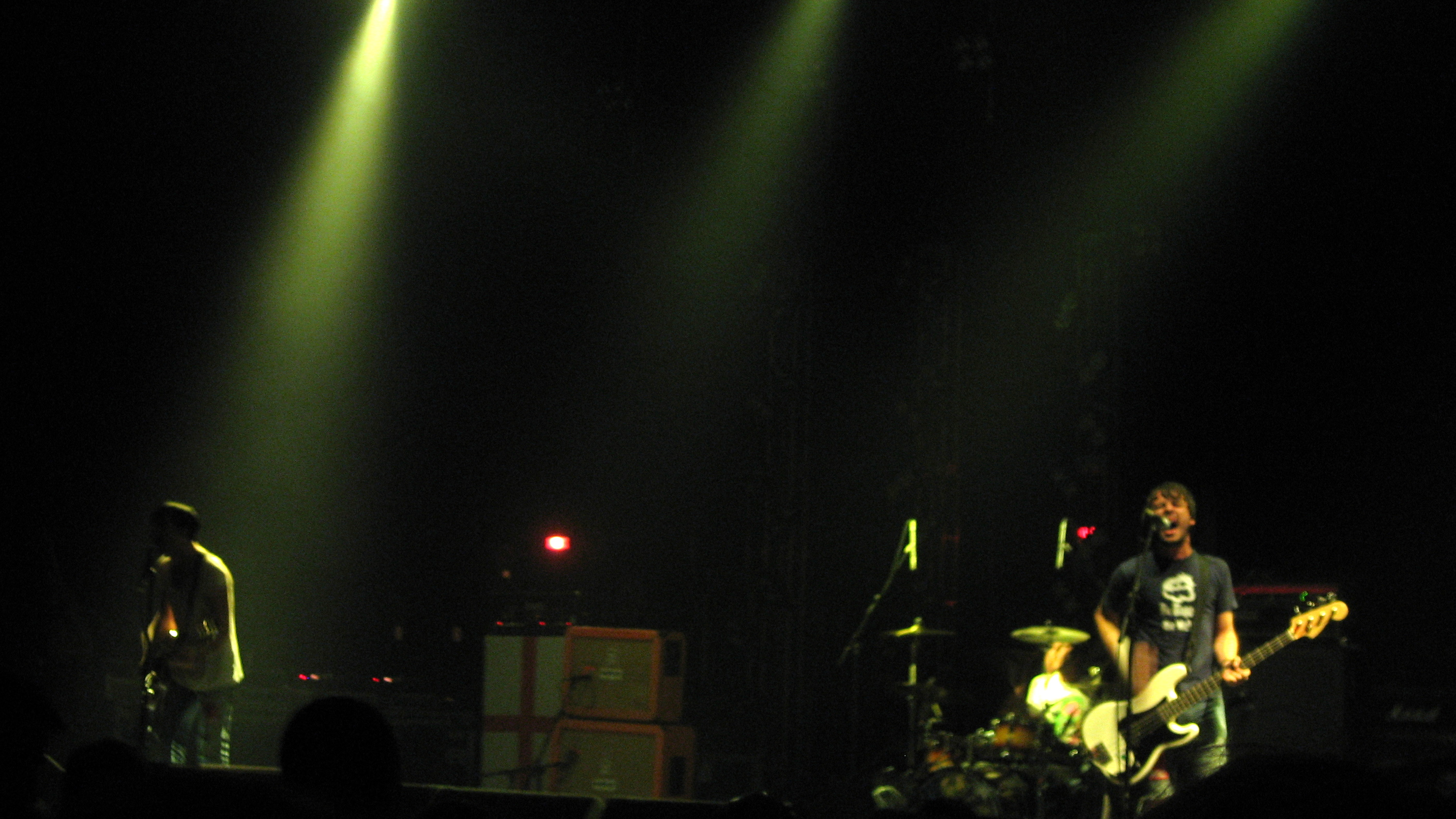
The Cribs in 2007

At the conclusion of The New Fellas campaign, the Cribs signed a major label deal with Warner Bros. Records – though they remained on Wichita in the UK at the bands insistence. The subsequent album, Men's Needs, Women's Needs, Whatever saw the band finally take steps to progress forth from their 'lo-fi' roots, being recorded in Vancouver, British Columbia, Canada with Alex Kapranos of Franz Ferdinand as producer. The band and producer had met during the US tour the bands did together with Death Cab for Cutie, and hit it off immediately. The album was mixed by Andy Wallace (Nirvana, Foo Fighters). They collaborated with Lee Ranaldo of Sonic Youth on the track "Be Safe" – Ranaldo contributing his spoken word poetry to the band's music.

Prior to the record's release the Cribs took in a run of small UK club dates to preview songs from the new record. This is documented in the first Cribs documentary Leave Too Neat. The first cut from the album was the single "Men's Needs", released on 7 May. It proved to be the band's first breakthrough with mainstream radio and reached no. 17 in the UK charts, becoming their biggest hit to date. The accompanying video, filmed in Hollywood by director Diane Martel has achieved over 7 million YouTube views to date.

The album was released on 21 May 2007, and entered the UK album charts at No. 13.

Touring began at the Royal Albert Hall in London on 30 March for the Teenage Cancer Trust. The rest of 2007 and most of 2008 was spent on the road promoting the record, taking in extensive UK and European touring, several United States and Canada tours, Japan, and the band's first trip out to Mexico for a main stage appearance at the MX Beat Festival, as well as some later headline shows. During their US touring schedules they appeared on Late Night with Conan O'Brien, the Late Show with David Letterman, and The Late Late Show with Craig Ferguson.

The second single to be released from the record was "Moving Pictures", again charting in the UK Top 40, and then later a 7-inch only release of "I'm a Realist". The latter was backed with a cover of the Replacements song "Bastards of Young", a band the Cribs cite as a large influence. Another non-album single "Don't You Wanna be Relevant?" was paired with album cut "Our Bovine Public" and again climbed to the UK top 40. There were numerous festival slots around this time including main stage slots at Lollapalooza, T in the Park, and V festival, as well as returning to Fuji Rock, and a first time appearance at Coachella amongst others. In November 2007 the Cribs were invited by a re-formed Sex Pistols to play with them for three nights at Brixton Academy in celebration of the 30-year anniversary of Never Mind the Bollocks In December the band announced three intimate shows at their old haunt the Brudenell Social Club in aid of cystic fibrosis where they would play all three albums to date in sequence with secret unannounced support bands each night (Franz Ferdinand, Kate Nash, and Kaiser Chiefs respectively). This was documented for the band's second DVD, the 3 disc Live at the Brudenell Social Club. In the year-end issues "Men's Needs" was named third-best track of 2007 by NME with the album coming in at No. 9, Track of the Year 2007 by the Metro newspaper and making the annual 100 best tracks list in Rolling Stone magazine in the US.

2008 began with the Cribs being nominated for 4 awards at the annual NME awards ceremony (Best British Band, Best Live Band, Best Track and Hero of the Year for Ryan Jarman). Through this they were asked to headline the annual NME Awards Tour, which they undertook through January and February featuring some of the band's largest headline shows up to that point and culminating in a show at the o2 Arena in London. They also made a live appearance at the Awards ceremony itself, playing new single "I'm a Realist" and a cover of "Panic" by the Smiths, featuring their new guitarist Johnny Marr (of the aforementioned band), who had been guesting with them throughout the tour. Another US tour followed this, and then some more festival appearances including main stage slots at the Isle of Wight Festival, Rockness, Primavera Festival, Fuji Rock and Sziget, as well as a headline appearance on the John Peel Stage at Glastonbury, and headlining the second stage at Reading and Leeds Festivals.

In April 2018, the album was certified Gold in the UK by the British Phonographic Industry for sales over 100,000, becoming the first album certified Gold by the BRIT Awards.

=== Ignore the Ignorant (2009–2010) ===
After a chance meeting with Johnny Marr (at the time a member of Modest Mouse) in Portland, Oregon, the Cribs and Marr became close friends. Once Modest Mouse completed touring duties for their record, the Cribs and Marr started to hang around and jam together – "It's been going well and it would be shame to cut it short, the original intention was to be doing an EP" the band told BBC 6 Music in January 2008. It was later announced that they would be working on an album together and that Marr had joined as a full-time member of the group.

Much of the remainder of 2008 was spent writing new material in Portland, Manchester and Wakefield, followed by a short UK tour taking in Glasgow ABC, Bradford St. Georges Hall, two nights at Manchester Ritz, and Heaven in London to road-test some of the new songs before recording commenced. Studio time was booked for March 2009 in Los Angeles with veteran producer Nick Launay (Nick Cave, PIL, Yeah Yeah Yeahs). Ross Jarman performed most of the drum tracks for the recording with a broken wrist after a skateboard accident. Promotion for the Ignore the Ignorant album came in the form of an intimate "alternative Leeds/Reading show" at HMV in Leeds. This was scheduled as the same weekend as the Reading and Leeds festival. The band played several songs from their new album as well as some old favourites. Afterwards, Ryan Jarman could be seen browsing the CD's in HMV and being available for fans to meet him.

Preceded by the single "Cheat on Me", the album Ignore the Ignorant was released on 7 September 2009, and scored the Cribs their first UK Top Ten album. Released the same week that the Beatles re-issued their entire 13 LP back-catalogue, Ignore the Ignorant managed to out-sell all but two of them to chart at number 8, something the band described as "surreal". Touring began with a headline slot at the White Air festival in Brighton followed by a UK tour of large halls. The band then went on to tour Japan (including a show at Budokan with Arctic Monkeys) then on to South Korea where they headlined the Grand Mint festival at the Olympic Park, Seoul. Next was a United States/Canada tour, as well as a European arena tour with Franz Ferdinand before the Cribs returned to the UK for their largest headline shows to date.

In December 2009, Ignore the Ignorant was placed at number 11 in Mojo magazine's "Albums of the Year", and at number 7 in The Fly's "Albums of the Year". NME also placed it at No. 30 in their end of year list, as well as making "Cheat on Me" a track of the year. In Japan, Crossbeat magazine placed it at No. 8 in its "Albums of 2009" list, whilst Music Magazine called it the No. 1 album of 2009. Both magazines are leading publications in Japan. At the same time, The New Fellas was named an "Album of the Century" by Q.

2010 began with another extensive United States and Canada tour, before heading off for dates in Australia and New Zealand. Festival appearances including Glastonbury, Lollapalooza, Fuji Rock, Benicassim, Sziget and Pukkelpop amongst others followed. During this time the band were invited to support Aerosmith at two arena shows in Spain and France. For Record Store Day 2010 the Cribs released "So Hot Now" as a split 7-inch single with Portland, OR band the Thermals on legendary riot grrrl label Kill Rock Stars. On 9 August 2010, BBC Radio 1 DJ Zane Lowe announced during his show that he would be playing a brand new Cribs song that night. The very next day, "Housewife" was released officially on iTunes. No one, from music industry insiders to the band's fans, had any idea that a new single was being geared up until that moment. The cover art featured Ryan and Gary in drag. Later that month the band appeared on the main stage once again at the Reading and Leeds festivals to close the album campaign. These would be Marr's last shows with the Cribs.

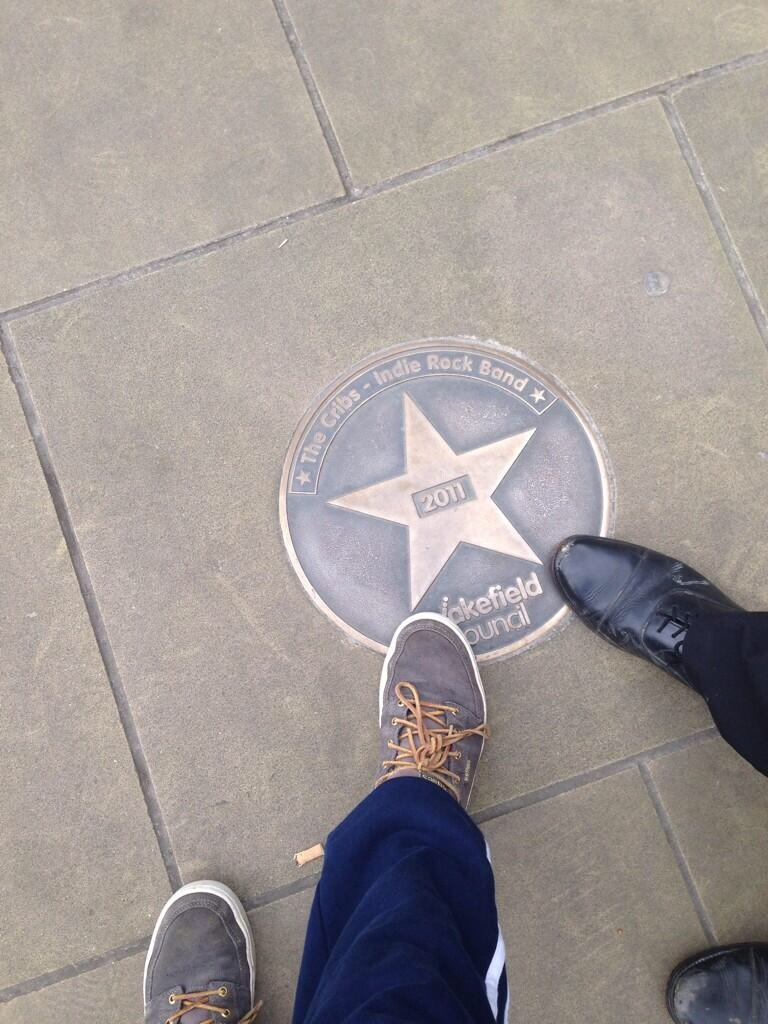
The Cribs' Star on the Wakefield Walk of Fame

=== In the Belly of the Brazen Bull (2011–2012) ===
After announcing Marr's departure from the group on 11 April 2011, the Cribs started work on writing the follow-up to Ignore the Ignorant, mooted for a spring 2012 release. During this time, they recorded a cover of original 70's Canadian punk band The Dishrags 'Death in the Family' for a Canadian Mint Records compilation. Over the summer they played several headlining slots at UK festivals in 2011, as well as a show at Le Zenith in Paris with the Strokes. In June 2011 they made their first trip to Brazil, playing two shows in São Paulo. In December 2011 they headlined the Clockenflap festival in Hong Kong, debuting new songs "Come On, Be a No-One", and "Anna" for the first time.

The Cribs announced the title of their fifth studio album as In the Belly of the Brazen Bull and its track-listing on 14 February 2012. The album was recorded at Tarbox Road studio in New York with David Fridmann, London's Abbey Road and Chicago's EAR studio with engineer Steve Albini. On 14 February, BBC Radio 1 DJ Zane Lowe premiered the first taster from the album, "Chi-Town" on his radio show and played the song 3 times. During this time, both the band and the song title were trending on Twitter. Shortly after the announcement was made, the band embarked on a quick UK tour, to preview the new material and promote the upcoming single, slated for April. In March, the band headed out on a tour of the United States, concluding in April, and later that month released the first official single from the new album "Come On, Be A No-One". A European tour followed, and then a full-scale UK tour in May – kicking off with a performance at the 2012 Camden Crawl. It was during this tour that the band were introduced to Turner Prize winning artist Martin Creed, who was acting as support band. The album was released on 7 May 2012 and would provide the band with their second UK Top 10 record, charting at number 9.

The next month, the band headed out for another tour of the United States and Canada, before flying to Japan to headline the Hostess Weekender festival at the Yebisu Garden Hall in Tokyo, as well as a show in Osaka. In July, the second official single from the album, "Glitters Like Gold" would be released on a special gold glitter vinyl. The band toured Italy, and then toured the European festival circuit throughout most of the summer, including a large outdoor show with the Foo Fighters in Belfast Boucher playing fields, and another engagement at the Reading and Leeds festival, where the band would destroy the instruments and stage set at the climax of the Reading show.

September would see the release of the third and final single from the album. "Anna", unlike the prior singles, was made available as a download only, and featured a collaboration with the aforementioned Martin Creed. The band and Creed had been looking for a project to collaborate on since meeting on tour earlier in the year, and the artist provided Work #1431 as the video to the single. In October the Cribs headlined Sŵn Festival in Cardiff, and then headed out on another UK and Irish tour. During this tour, the Cribs were awarded the 'Spirit of Independence' award at the Q Awards 2012 on 22 October. At the conclusion of the UK tour, the band headed to eastern Europe where, amongst other dates, they would visit Croatia, Czech Republic, Greece and Turkey for the first time. Following these dates, the band headed to South America to play a show in Brazil, and then on to Argentina for a show at the open air hockey arena Club Ciudad de Buenos Aires for the Personal Fest festival. 2013 would see the band visit Australia for 3 shows in January, effectively concluding live touring for 'In The Belly of The Brazen Bull'.

In the end of year lists, the album was placed by The Guardian (#22), NME (#8), The Fly (#21), This Is Fake DIY (#3) amongst others in the UK.

=== Payola (2013) ===
On 20 November 2012 the Cribs announced details of their first 'Best Of' compilation, Payola, which was released on 11 March 2013 via Wichita Recordings to mark the group's 10th anniversary. The 22 track album saw the first official release of "Leather Jacket Love Song" – recorded at sessions in early 2010, it is the final Cribs song to feature Johnny Marr. A special 40-track 'Anthology Edition' was released with an additional 18 track disc containing B-sides and rarities. On 29 February, the band made their fourth appearance on the cover of NME magazine, which came with an additional CD release "Payola: The Demos". This companion disc to "Payola" featured demo versions of most of the significant songs featured on "Payola", as well as 3 unheard and unreleased tracks harking back as far as 2001.

Around the same time the band played an NME Awards show at Shepherd's Bush Empire and several other headline dates around the country. Over the summer, the Cribs played numerous festivals in the UK and Europe, including headline slots at Y Not Festival and a show at the Olympic Park (London), as well as a short tour of Scottish venues. Autumn saw the band head back to Australia for an "Anniversary Tour", before venturing into Asia for a lengthy tour there. Cities and countries visited on this trip would include Thailand (Bangkok), Malaysia (Kuala Lumpur), Vietnam (Saigon), two shows in Japan (Tokyo), a show at the Kowloonbay International Trade & Exhibition Centre in Hong Kong, and a large outdoor show in the meadow at the Gardens by the Bay in Singapore. The year was rounded out by two sold out Christmas shows at the Leeds Academy

2014 began quietly, as the band began writing sessions for their next studio album. The only shows announced would be as part of the Weezer Cruise from Florida to the Bahamas in February. Later in the year, the Cribs returned to the UK for some UK festival slots, including headlining Truck Festival and Tramlines Festival amongst others, and an Italian tour with Franz Ferdinand.

=== For All My Sisters (2014–2016) ===
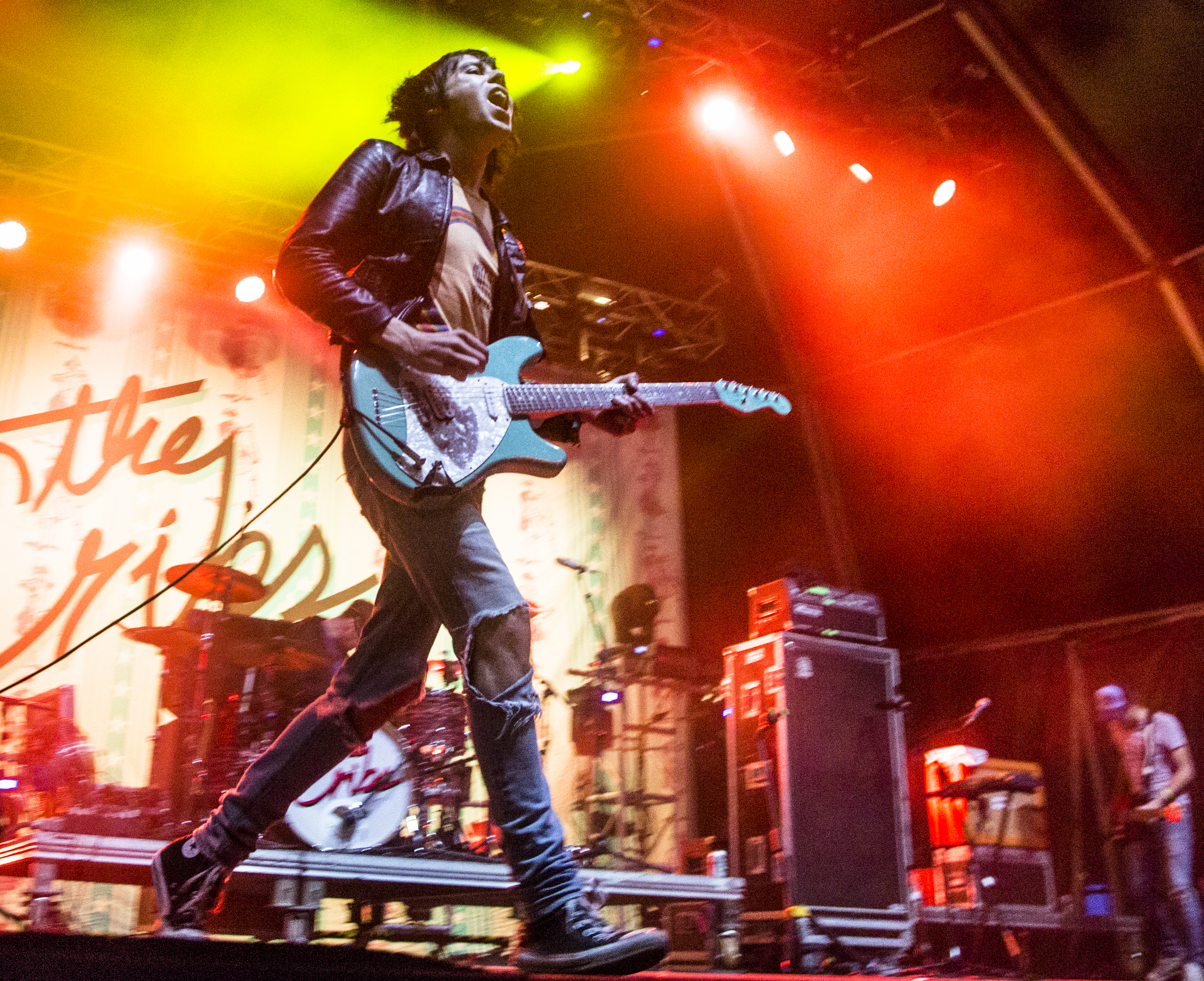
The Cribs at Festival Internacional de Benicàssim 2015

In August 2014, Music Week reported that the band had signed with Sony RED. This followed news that the band's sixth album was to be produced by former Cars frontman Ric Ocasek, known for his work with artists including Weezer, Nada Surf and Guided by Voices. Frenchkiss Records was also named by Music Week as the band's new label for North America, but the band would ultimately later announce their signing with Arts & Crafts. "An Ivory Hand", a teaser track for the upcoming album had a midnight digital release on 19 January 2015. It received its first radio play later that day from the BBC's Steve Lamacq. It would later be made 'Single of the Week' by the NME. The album, For All My Sisters, was released in the UK on 23 March 2015; although due in North America on 24 March 2015, it was released the same day. It would go on to become the Cribs' third consecutive UK Top 10 album.

The first single from the album, "Burning For No One", was debuted by BBC Radio 1 on 2 February by Zane Lowe, who made it his 'Hottest Record in the World'. The accompanying video, shot on the Bahamian island of Exuma was released on 16 February and clocked up over 200,000 views on YouTube in its first week.

The new songs were road tested on a quick UK tour of sold-out shows, and then the band went to New York City to play a 3 night residency across 3 different venues (2 in Brooklyn, 1 in Manhattan), before heading to Austin, Texas for the annual SXSW showcase, playing 4 shows across 3 days. Immediately after returning from SXSW, The Cribs embarked on a week-long tour of in-store performances and signings at independent record stores throughout the UK.

US touring began a few weeks later in San Francisco for a tour of the west coast, and would include a second appearance at the Coachella Festival, playing the Sunday of both weekends and playing headline shows throughout the state and Las Vegas in the intervening week. For this outing, the band was joined on stage by Michael Cummings of the NYC band Skaters.

Back in the UK, the Cribs headlined Leeds Town Hall as part of the Live at Leeds festival in May, before headlining The Great Escape Festival in Brighton with 2 performances, and then two shows in Ireland. That summer they would play on the main stages at the Liverpool Sound City festival and T in the Park, and made their third appearance on The Other Stage at Glastonbury. They would also play at Festival Internacional de Benicassim in Spain.

The Cribs then went out to Asia, for a headline show in Tokyo, and a main stage appearance at the Pentaport Rock Festival in Incheon, South Korea. Later that month they would appear on the Main Stage at the Reading and Leeds Festivals for the third time before heading out to North America for a full tour there. During the band's performance at the Fairmount Theatre in Montreal as part of the Pop Montreal festival, the band would perform 'Be Safe' with Lee Ranaldo performing his spoken word part live in person for only the second time since the song's release (the first coming in 2008 at the Music Hall of Williamsburg).

A full UK tour was announced during this period, and took place in October and November, which included dates at Glasgow Barrowlands, Manchester Albert Hall, and The Roundhouse in Camden amongst others.

In 2016 the Cribs were announced as headliners of the Camden Rocks Festival taking place in June. Over the summer the Cribs would play the main stage at Isle of Wight Festival, Y Not Festival, and were the secret unannounced headliners of In The Woods Festival in Kent. During the summer, the Cribs played their largest headline show to date, at the 8,000 capacity open air Millennium Square in Leeds.

Another tour of Asia followed, including stops in S. Korea (Seoul), Japan (Tokyo and Osaka) and the band's first engagement in China, where they would play the Shanghai Rugby Football Stadium for the Concrete and Grass Festival. Shortly after the show the Cribs announced that this would be the final show of the "For All My Sisters" tour.

=== 24–7 Rock Star Shit (2017–2018) ===
On 3 February 2017 it was announced that the Cribs would be the subject to their own exhibition in their hometown at Wakefield Museum. The exhibit featured 3 large glass containers dedicated to each of the band members with their chosen instruments as well as various memorabilia such as early gig posters, awards, touring paraphernalia and original records. The exhibit was unveiled on 14 February 2017 by Ross, who appeared on BBC Look North playing the drum kit within his respective glass container. The exhibition ran until July 2017.

On 7 February 2017 the Cribs announced a 10th anniversary tour in honour of their third album. The "Men's Needs, Women's Needs, FOREVER" tour was initially scheduled to consist of seven dates in large venues across the UK. A second London date at the Forum was later added due to popular demand. The tour commenced on 11 May at Glasgow Academy and finished on 20 May with a show at Leeds First Direct Arena where they were joined live on stage by Lee Ranaldo for his spoken word part in Be Safe. The band also performed the album in full for their headlining slot on the Baltic Stage at Liverpool Sound City festival.

Following the final night of this tour, at midnight on 21 May, the Cribs tweeted a series of code which the next day revealed itself to be coordinates for various record stores across the UK and the US, along with specific timestamp for each store. Arriving at the location at the specified time would allow customers to purchase a white label single entitled "Year of Hate". Each single was hand numbered and the edition number totaled 247. This process continued with handfuls of co-ordinates for record stores being announced each day for the next week. The cryptic coordinate approach was dropped on 22 May due to the recent attack in Manchester. Despite the limited run number and obscure release method the single entered the UK vinyl singles chart at number 3 on the week commencing 26 May 2017. The song eventually saw a digital release on 16 June – until that time the only way to hear it was by playing the vinyl or via BBC iPlayer on-demand, after Steve Lamacq aired the song on his show.

A second single "In Your Palace" was shock released digitally on 2 June 2017 with a music video released on 13 June. It was then announced on 24 July 2017 that the album "24–7 Rock Star Shit" would be released 2 weeks later on 11 August 2017, alongside a music video for another new song – "Rainbow Ridge", which was available as a free download with a pre-order of the album. Exclusive launch parties were announced for Leeds and London – with the London party being a curated event at House of Vans, featuring an art display, Q&A with the band, and a full live performance on the night the album was released. Entrants were selected by a free-to-enter ballot via the Vans website.

After spending three days at number 1 in the UK charts, the album mid-weeked at number 5, before officially entering the charts at number 8 – the band's fourth consecutive Top 10 album.

Following this, the Cribs began a tour of the United States and Canada. At the conclusion of this tour they returned to Mexico to headline the Sala Corona in Mexico City, and to play the main stages at Live Out Festival in Monterrey and Festival Coordenada in Guadalajara. In December, to celebrate the 10th anniversary of the original 'Cribsmas' event, the band booked Christmas residency shows in the UK – 4 nights in Glasgow, 4 nights in Manchester, 3 nights in London, and 5 nights in Leeds – performing over 80 songs from their back catalogue. In 2018 the band continued their UK tour with the '24–7 Rock Star Shit in the UK' tour – a 14 date tour of secondary markets throughout January.

In April the band went to Australia to play shows in Newcastle, Brisbane, Perth, Sydney, Adelaide and Melbourne. Following this was a 4 date tour of China in May – visiting Chengdu, Wuhan, Shanghai, and Beijing. A show in Hong Kong followed as well as two shows in Japan. Summer saw the Cribs invited to support Foo Fighters at City of Manchester Stadium alongside several other UK festival appearances.

=== Night Network (2019–2024) ===
Following the release of their fourth consecutive UK top 10 album 24-7 Rock Star Shit, the band almost immediately parted company with their long time UK management and found themselves stuck in what Gary described as "legal morass", unable to record or release new music. This is because the band had belatedly discovered that the rights to the back catalogue from earlier in their career was owned by other parties thanks to various deals that they were unaware of. As a result, the band – who were now managing themselves – decided to focus on gaining ownership because there would be no point in signing a new deal, making a new record and touring as long as someone else owned their music.

What followed was an eighteen month period of inactivity, resulting in 2019 being the only year since the band's inception in 2002 whereby the band did not play a live concert, following their final gig of the 24-7 Rock Star Shit tour in Glasgow in September 2018.

In a position of uncertainty about how to continue beyond the already-booked gigs, following a show where the Cribs had supported Foo Fighters in Manchester at the Etihad Stadium in June 2018, Dave Grohl learned of the band's struggles and offered for the band to use his Studio 606.

Following the successful resolution of their back catalogue ownership, the band was set to sign a major label deal. But then it emerged that there was yet other people claiming ownership of their music, and so they had to go through another legal battle from September 2019 to February 2020 while working on the new album.

During 2020, the band was active on Twitter to participate in Tim Burgess' "Listening Parties", offering behind the scenes insight for their most commercially successful album Men's Needs, Women's Needs, Whatever on 7 April and due to the positive response, followed up with another listening party of fan favourite The New Fellas on 28 May.

On 8 June, the band announced on their social media pages, with four hours notice, their first live performance in nearly two years. This turned out to be a pre-recorded webcam broadcast of "Be Safe", featuring Lee Ranaldo performing his spoken word part, from their residences across the world (Ryan in Queens, New York, Gary in Portland, Oregon, Ross in Wakefield and Lee in Manhattan, New York).

On 12 August 2020, a day over three years since their last new material 24-7 Rock Star Shit, the band's social media profile pictures changed to a stylised test card. The following day on 13 August 2020, the band announced their return with a new song to be broadcast on BBC Radio 6 Music. The song turned out to be lead single "Running Into You" and subsequently the band announced new album Night Network to be released on 13 November 2020, along with artwork, tracklisting and a video for "Running Into You" starring Sam Riley.

Released into the UK COVID-19 lockdown of 2020, the band had all of their scheduled headline touring to support the album delayed. The album release was therefore celebrated with a socially distanced performance at Liverpool's legendary Cavern Club on 21 November. This performance was streamed worldwide as a PPV via the Veeps platform.

On 15 July 2021, the Cribs released a cover of the Comet Gain song "Fingernailed For You" as part of the Kill Rock Stars label's 30th anniversary covers compilation "Stars Rock Kill (Rock Stars)".

On 12 August 2021 they announced details of a monthly mail-order singles club, to run September–December. Members would receive an exclusive 2 track 7-inch each month, plus a collectors box, sew on patch, and sticker. They also announced a one-off outdoor show at Halifax Piece Hall, to take place on September 3. The band would spend much of 2022 (April - September) on tour in the US with Modest Mouse.

On 29 July 2022, the Cribs released reissues of their first three albums, the main reason for which was because the albums' vinyl editions had been out of print for some time. After regaining the rights and master tapes for the albums through the legal battle that caused the band's inactivity several years prior, they spent 2021 sifting through their archives for bonus material to include on the reissues. To mark the reissues' release, the band did a number of shows at intimate venues in which they performed all three albums in full. All three reissued albums entered the Top Ten of the midweek UK Albums Chart.

On 22 September 2022, it was announced that Kill Rock Stars would be releasing 'Vs. The Moths: College Sessions 2001', a 7-inch EP featuring the original sessions recorded by the band at Wakefield College.

On 23 April 2025, it was announced that The Cribs will be performing at Chicago punk rock festival Riot Fest during the weekend of 19-21 September 2025. This will be the first time The Cribs have played in the United States in three years.

=== Selling a Vibe (2025–present) ===
On 18 August 2025, the Cribs announced that their ninth album, Selling a Vibe, would be released on 9 January 2026. Subsequently, they announced tours of the US, supporting the Rapture, and of the UK, with Courting in support.

== Band members ==
Current members

- Gary Jarman – bass, vocals (2001–present)
- Ryan Jarman – guitar, vocals (2001–present)
- Ross Jarman – drums (2001–present)

Former members

- Johnny Marr – guitar (2008–2011)

Touring musicians

- David Jones – guitar (2011–2015)
- Michael Cummings – guitar, keyboard, bass
- Russell Searle – guitar, keyboard (May 2015 – present)

== Awards and nominations ==
Year	Awarding Body	Award	Result
2005	ASCAP Awards	College Award	Won
2008	NME Awards	Best British Band	Nominated
2008	NME Awards	Best Live Band	Nominated
2008	NME Awards	Best Track (Men's Needs)	Nominated
2008	NME Awards	Hero of the Year (Ryan Jarman)	Nominated
2008	NME Awards USA	Best International Live Band	Nominated
2010	NME Awards	Best Album (Ignore The Ignorant)	Nominated
2012	Q Awards	Spirit of Independence	Won
2012	Q Awards	Best Live Act	Nominated
2013	AIM Awards	Best Live Band	Nominated
2013	NME Awards	Outstanding Contribution to Music	Won
2013	NME Awards	Best British Band	Nominated
2013	NME Awards	Best Live Band	Nominated
2014	The Fly Awards	Best Live Band	Nominated

== Discography ==
- The Cribs (2004)
- The New Fellas (2005)
- Men's Needs, Women's Needs, Whatever (2007)
- Ignore the Ignorant (2009)
- In the Belly of the Brazen Bull (2012)
- For All My Sisters (2015)
- 24-7 Rock Star Shit (2017)
- Night Network (2020)
- Selling a Vibe (2026)

== Fanzine ==
A group of between fifty and one-hundred committed fans aimed to 'collect thoughtful, dedicated and passionate written work' on the band beginning in early summer 2011. Kind Words from the Broken Hearted 'outlines a range of responses to the Cribs...with many otherwise "ordinary" men and women contributing ideas and views' that fill the pages of the fanzine. Pieces within the fanzine emphasise the importance of Wichita Recordings, Domino Recording Company, Kill Rock Stars and Fortuna Pop!, amongst others, in providing a vibrant and supportive environment for independent bands to hone their work and retain an ethical stance in the music industry. The fanzine also shares close links with fellow Wakefield independent music fans at Rhubarb Bomb, in addition to Bonus Cupped, a left-leaning, travel and punk publication from Bristol. Moreover, Kind Words from the Broken Hearted supports other forms of independent music, including Comet Gain, Edwyn Collins and Pavement to name but three, welcoming diverse forms of the art but keen to eschew a celebratory tone that pervades contemporary music journalism. Notable readers, and upcoming contributors include band collaborator Nick Scott at Narcsville and Eddie Argos and Jasper Future from Art Brut. Support from within contemporary music journalism has come from influential the Smiths and David Bowie writer and broadcaster Simon Goddard, in addition to Tim Jonze at The Guardian. Those interested by independent journalism can find the fanzine through a regular address or alternatively through an Edinburgh-based social media site.
