= Ryan Jarman =

British musician with The Cribs

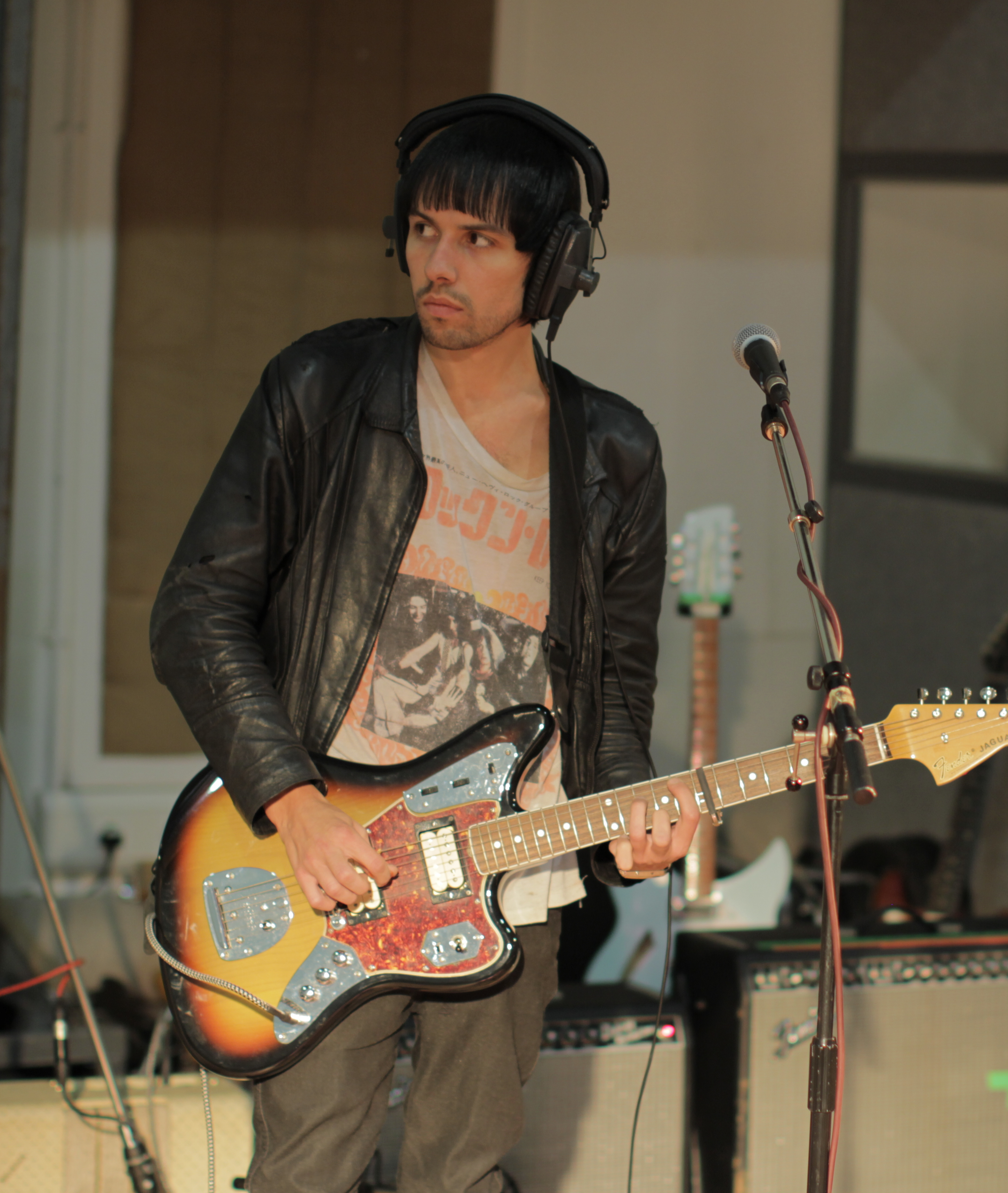
- Jarman at Abbey Road Studios in 2011
- Born: Ryan James Jarman; October 20, 1980 (age 45)
- Occupations: musician; record producer; songwriter
- Years active: 2000–present
- Relatives: Gary Jarman (twin brother); Ross Jarman (brother)
- Musical career
- Origin: Wakefield, West Yorkshire England
- Genres: indie rock; post-punk revival; garage rock revival; garage punk; garage rock
- Instruments: guitar; vocals
- Member of: The Cribs
- Website: thecribs.com

Ryan James Jarman is a British musician who is the guitarist and one of the vocalists of the indie rock band The Cribs.

== The Cribs ==
Jarman formed The Cribs in 2001 with his twin brother, Gary, and younger brother, Ross.

The band has released six albums on the Wichita label, the first two being The Cribs (produced by Ed Deegan and Bobby Conn), and The New Fellas (produced by Edwyn Collins, singer in influential indie band Orange Juice).

The Cribs' third album, Men's Needs, Women's Needs, Whatever was released in May 2007; the record was produced by Alex Kapranos of Franz Ferdinand.

Their fourth studio album Ignore the Ignorant, released in September 2009 included ex-Smiths guitarist Johnny Marr; Ignore the Ignorant was produced by Nick Launay in Los Angeles. The Cribs' fifth album, In the Belly of the Brazen Bull produced by Dave Fridmann and Steve Albini was released in May 2012.

On 12 March 2013, The Cribs released Payola, a 22-track compilation album featuring some of their greatest hits and rarities.

The bands sixth studio album, For All My Sisters, was released on 20 March 2015.

== Playing style ==
Jarman plays repetitive, high pitched, guitar riffs. In a recent poll of The Cribs back catalogue, NME claimed that "Another Number" was an "early indication of Ryan's status as one of the best – and most underrated – guitarists of his generation" For Ignore the Ignorant, Jarman and Johnny Marr would refer to each other as "axe-bro's", as Marr told Total Guitar in October 2010: "We're very deliberate about being a twin guitar assault, Ryan is a busy player and I am too, so we both fizz and whoever comes to the top is backed up. Ryan is one of the best guitarists to come out of British pop culture. He's in an elite handful of people doing innovative, unexpected things".

== Gear ==
Up until the Cribs' third album, Jarman played Fender Mustang guitars. He discovered the Gibson ES-335 in recording Men's Needs, Women's Needs, Whatever, and took to using it almost exclusively live afterwards. He now uses a Squier Venus for his Cribs work, and an Epiphone Coronet for his side project. He has also been seen using a vintage Mosrite Ventures, and a Pawn Shop series Fender Mustang (well known as Fender Pawn Shop Mustang Special) in 'Lake Placid' blue as well as a Sonic Blue Fender Mustang with a black hotrails pickup.

=== Signature Squier Guitar ===
After using Fender guitars for many years, Jarman was given his own signature model in 2016, released through the Squier brand. The Squier Ryan Jarman Signature includes Duncan Designed single-coil Jaguar neck pickup and a 'high output' humbucking bridge pickup, blended with master volume and tone controls along with phase and on/off switches for each pickup, and a toggle killswitch. An adjust-o-matic bridge with Fender Jaguar tailpiece, large '60s-style headstock and metal control plate offer vintage looks and practical usage. Combining elements of the Fender Mustang and Jaguar guitars, the Squier Ryan Jarman Signature Guitar is more commonly referred to as the 'Mus-Uar', as it was influenced by the Fender Jag-Stang.

=== Amps and effects ===
Although sparingly spotted with Vox amplifiers in the early days of the Cribs, Jarman has almost always played through Orange amps. Jarman has been quoted as saying that, out of habit, he runs both an AD30 combo and head at the same time with the combo on top of an Orange cabinet and the head hidden out of view. In situations where taking both would be impractical, he uses just the AD30R Combo. As of 2012, Jarman has started using a Green Matamp head alongside the Orange head. For effects, his regular pedals are the Fulltone OCD and the Ibanez Tube Screamer, which was his pedal of choice until 2008. Primarily using just distortion, Jarman has however recently started using an Electro Harmonix Poly-Chorus regularly both live and in the studio. Jarman also claims to use the thickest possible strings, both for tonal reasons and to minimise any string bend, giving his playing a more robotic feel. Rotosound custom make his own gauge for him.

== Production ==
As well as producing/co-producing many tracks with the Cribs, Jarman has also produced records by various other bands. From Springtime Studios, which Jarman set up with his brothers in Wakefield in 2002, he engineered and worked with various local bands as well as numerous records for Leeds-based noise label Squirrel Records. In 2010, he produced the Comet Gain album Howl of the Lonely Crowd. More recently, he has produced tracks for Frankie & the Heartstrings, Kate Nash and has produced the debut record by This Many Boyfriends.

== Personal life ==
At the 2006 NME Awards, Jarman was seriously injured when he collected an award on behalf of Franz Ferdinand. In his haste to accept it, he jumped across the Kaiser Chiefs' table, breaking a large jar containing 'Flying Saucer' sweets and stabbing himself in the back on one of the shards. He spent 4 hours in hospital receiving 15 stitches before returning to party at the awards. He subsequently went missing and was found slumped in a hallway by Radio 1 DJ Zane Lowe. Jarman was bleeding profusely and another ambulance was called to return him to hospital. He received both external and internal stitches to repair a rip to the membrane around the kidney that the first surgeon had missed. Jarman was discharged the next morning.

Jarman was in a four-year relationship with Kate Nash, however it was announced in 2012 that the pair had split.

In 2015, it was reported that Jarman had been in a two-year relationship with musician Jennifer Turner.
