= Ross Jarman =

British drummer (born 1984)

- Jarman at WhiteAir Festival in September 2009
- Born: Ross Anthony Jarman; 22 September 1984 (age 41)
- Occupation: Musician
- Years active: 2000–present
- Relatives: Gary Jarman (brother); Ryan Jarman (brother)
- Musical career
- Origin: Wakefield, West Yorkshire, England
- Genres: Indie rock; power pop; punk rock; lo-fi
- Instrument: Drums

Ross Anthony Jarman (born 22 September 1984) is a British drummer who is a member of the indie rock band The Cribs.

== The Cribs ==
Ross was born and raised in Wakefield. He formed The Cribs in the early 2000s with brothers Ryan and Gary in Wakefield. The band is known for their short, punchy tunes with pop riffs and a lo-fi sound, influenced by bands like Huggy Bear and Beat Happening. The Cribs have released five albums on the Wichita label, the first two being The Cribs (produced by Ed Deegan and Bobby Conn), and The New Fellas (produced by Edwyn Collins, singer in influential indie band Orange Juice). The Cribs' third album, Men's Needs, Women's Needs, Whatever was released on 21 May 2007; the record was produced by Alex Kapranos of Franz Ferdinand. The Cribs' fourth album, "Ignore the Ignorant" was released on 7 September 2009; the record was produced by Nick Launay. The Cribs' fifth album, "In the Belly of the Brazen Bull" was released in May 2012.

Ross is known by friends for his dry sense of humour and as a very down to earth person. When asked about being designated the band's drummer, Jarman said; "As far as me being on the drums, I’m sure it's purely to do just with the fact that I’m the youngest so I get the worst instrument. You know, like the oldest kid gets the biggest room; the youngest gets the smallest bedroom. The youngest gets the drum kit while the oldest gets a guitar and sing at the front. [...] You know when you’re a kid, you don’t want to be the drummer. You want to be the frontman with the guitar. But no, I certainly don’t think it’s the worst instrument now."

In March 2009, Ross was reported to have broken his left wrist in a skateboarding accident, whilst recording Ignore the Ignorant in Los Angeles, California. After only having one track laid down, he carried on and finished the last 11 tracks taking Vicodin in between takes, then having his wrist cast after finishing his album commitments 10 days later.
