= Gary Jarman =

British musician (born 1980)

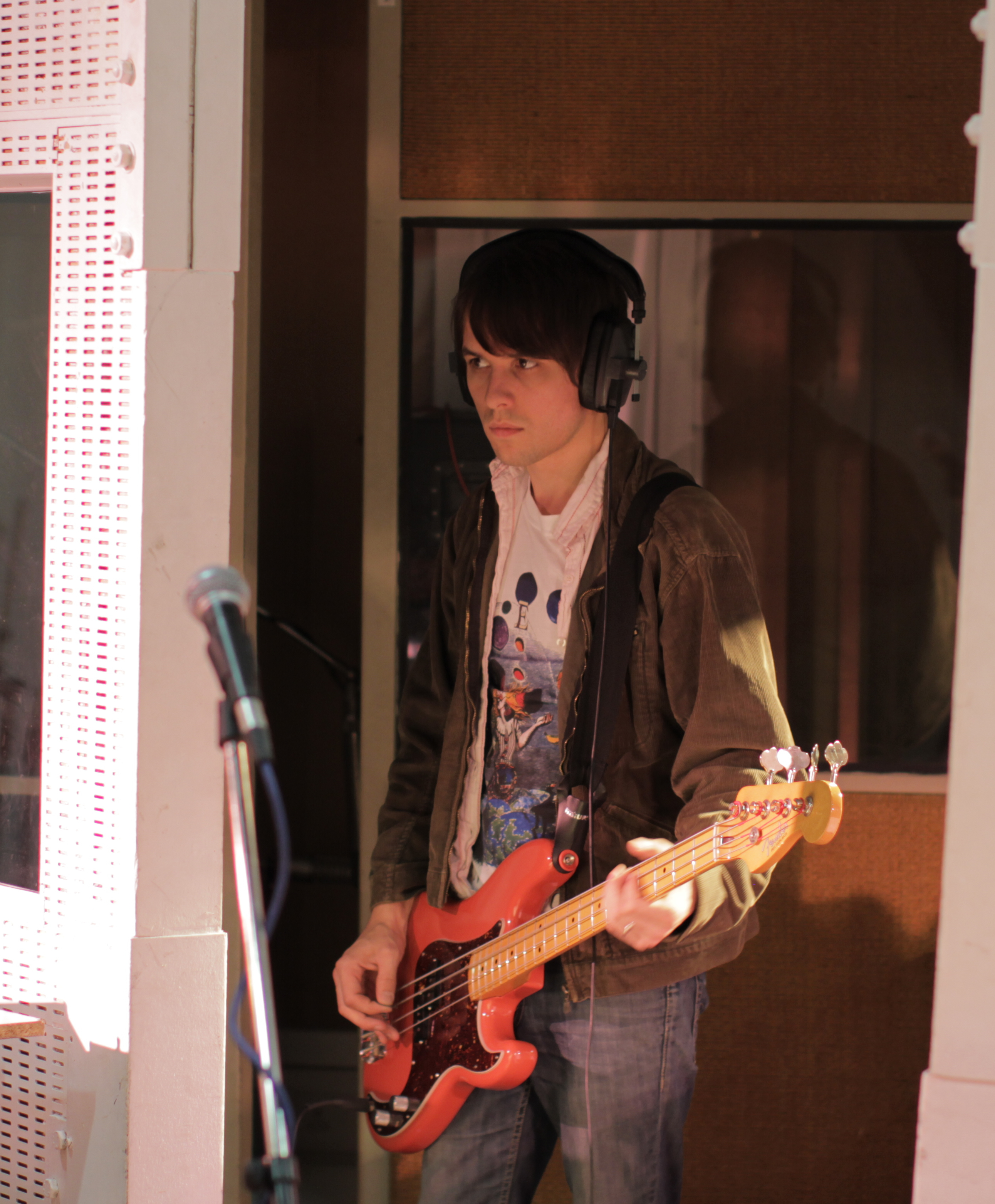
- Jarman at Abbey Road Studios in 2011
- Born: Gary John Jarman; 20 October 1980 (age 45)
- Occupations: Musician; songwriter; producer
- Years active: 2000–present
- Relatives: Ryan Jarman (twin brother); Ross Jarman (brother)
- Musical career
- Origin: Wakefield, West Yorkshire England
- Genres: Indie rock; power pop; punk rock; lo-fi
- Instruments: Bass; vocals

Gary John Jarman is a British bassist and singer in the indie rock band The Cribs. He has lived in Portland, Oregon, since 2006.

The band consists of his twin brother Ryan and his younger brother Ross. Gary participating as part of the committee that put on the UK's first "Ladyfest" in London.

In 2009 he underwent surgery in the US to remove growths from his vocal cords.

== Other work ==
Has worked with Quasi (in which his wife Joanna Bolme plays bass), Comet Gain, and Jeffrey Lewis – guesting as a drummer. In 2008, he recorded vocals for a track called "I Would Like to be Forgiven" by fellow Wakefield band The Research, and appeared in the music video for Stephen Malkmus and The Jicks' song "Gardenia".

In 2009 he played bass with Franz Ferdinand during two of their shows supporting Green Day, when bassist Bob Hardy forgot about a wedding he had been invited to. Later that year he guested on Guided By Voices frontman Robert Pollard's new band Boston Spaceships album, The Planets Are Blasted.

In 2010, he contributed his bass playing as part of ex-Grandaddy guitarist Jim Fairchild's project All Smiles, appearing on the album Staylow and Mighty.

In 2016, he engineered and produced the debut album by Portland instrumental-prog trio Blesst Chest, in his basement.

== Bass ==
In 2014, Jarman was named one of the "Greatest Bass Players of All-Time" by NME and its readers. His playing style was described thus "A true punk, Jarman’s bass playing is often violent and thrashy but he never misses a note or a beat."

In 2016, it was announced that Jarman would receive his own signature bass through Fender/Squier. The Gary Jarman Signature Bass was released in August 2016.

He endorses Fender basses, of which he prefers the Precision and Mustang, and Ampeg bass amplifiers, using valve Classics and Vintage, as well as the solid-state SVT 350, through classic 8x10 cabinets.
