= Los Campesinos! discography =

Discography of Welsh indie pop band Los Campesinos!

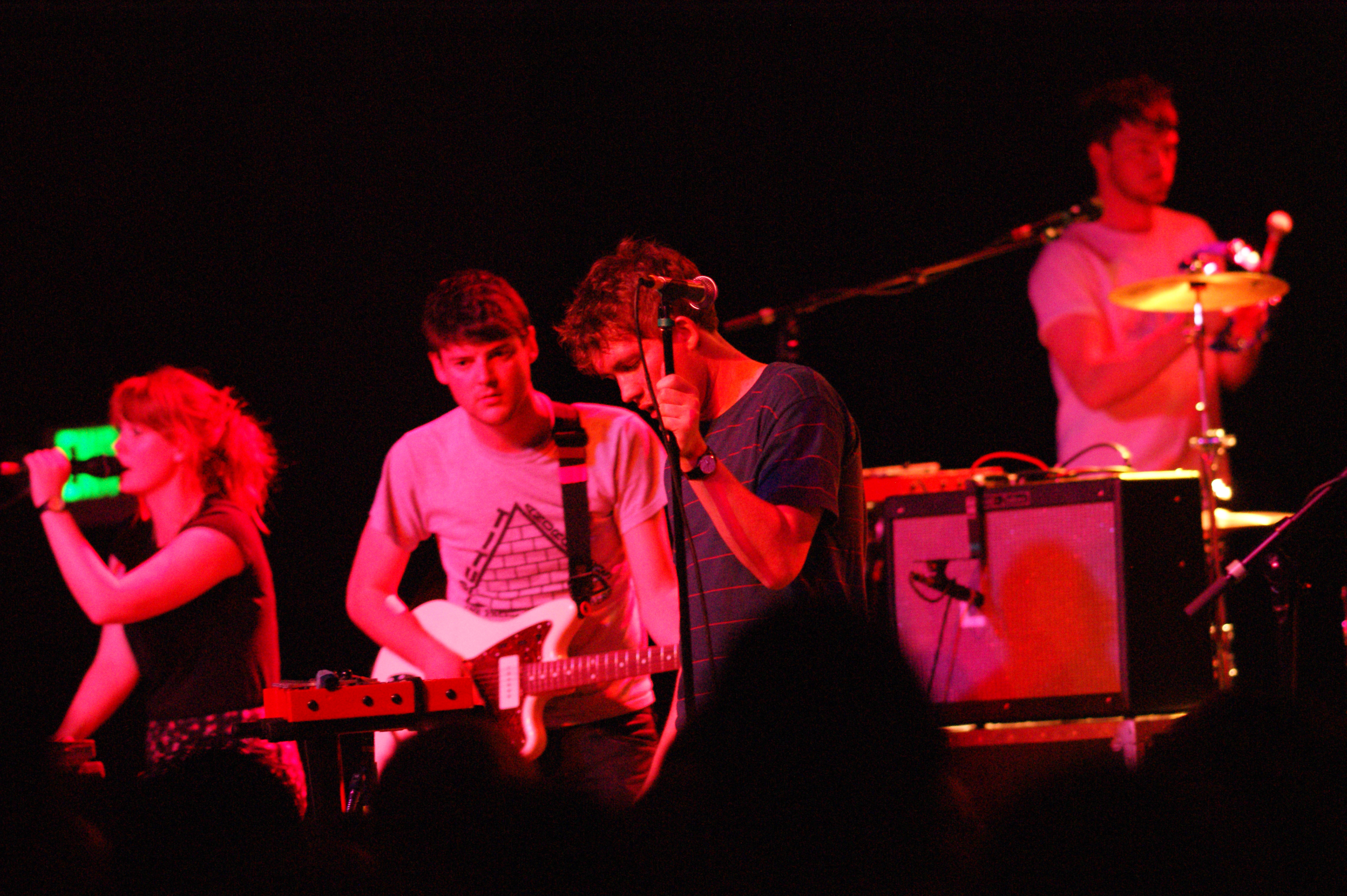
- Los Campesinos! performing live in 2010
- Studio albums: 7
- EPs: 4
- Live albums: 2
- Compilation albums: 2
- Singles: 25

The discography of Welsh emo and indie rock band Los Campesinos! consists of seven studio albums, two live albums, two compilation albums, five EPs and 25 singles.

Los Campesinos! was formed in early 2006 and has gone through a number of line-up changes. Influenced by the twee-pop movement, their first two albums were both released in 2008. Hold on Now, Youngster... and We Are Beautiful, We Are Doomed both received critical acclaim, prompting their third album in 2010, Romance Is Boring, which was praised for expanding their "already sizeable instrumental palette".

Their fourth release, Hello Sadness, was released in 2011, followed by No Blues in 2013 and Sick Scenes in 2017. The band has also released a live album – Good Night for a Fistfight in 2013, and five EPs, most recently More Hell in 2024. They released their seventh studio album, All Hell, in July 2024.

== Albums ==
=== Studio albums ===
List of albums, with selected chart positions
Title	Album details	Peak chart positions							
Title	Album details	UK	UK Indie	BEL	NED Alt.	SCO	US Heat.	US Indie	US Rock
Hold on Now, Youngster...	Released: 22 February 2008; Label: Arts & Crafts (A&C 031), Wichita (WEBB 160); Formats: CD, LP, digital download	72	38	97	15	100	45	—	—
We Are Beautiful, We Are Doomed	Released: 27 October 2008; Label: Arts & Crafts (A&C 037), Wichita (WEBB 187); Formats: CD, LP, digital download	112	42	—	—	—	43	—	—
Romance Is Boring	Released: 26 January 2010; Label: Arts & Crafts (A&C 050), Wichita (WEBB 239); Formats: CD, LP, digital download	92	23	—	—	59	3	28	—
Hello Sadness	Released: 14 November 2011; Label: Arts & Crafts (A&C 065), Wichita (WEBB 315); Formats: CD, LP, digital download, streaming	186	13	—	—	22	3	37	48
No Blues	Released: 29 October 2013; Label: Turnstile (TS 007), Wichita (WEBB 410); Formats: CD, LP, digital download, streaming	— (Note: No Blues did not enter the UK Albums Chart, but peaked at number 67 on the UK Album Sales Chart.)	14	—	—	—	35	—	—
Sick Scenes	Released: 24 February 2017; Label: Wichita (WEBB 500); Formats: CD, LP, digital download, streaming	83	8	—	—	67	14	32	—
All Hell	Scheduled: 19 July 2024; Label: Heart Swells; Formats: CD, LP, cassette, digital download, streaming	14	3	—	—	6	—	—	—
"—" denotes a recording that did not chart or was not released in that territory.

=== Live albums ===
List of live albums, with details shown
Title	Details
A Good Night for a Fistfight	Released: 4 May 2013; Label: Heart Swells; Formats: Cassette (CS), digital download
So Close to Heaven (Live at Troxy)	Released: 20 August 2025; Label: Heart Swells; Formats: digital download

=== Compilations ===
List of compilation albums, with details shown
Title	Details
Hold On Now, Youngster... The Demos	Released: 14 November 2011; Label: Arts & Crafts; Formats: CD, digital download
Hold On Now, Youngster... Rarities Collection	Released: 24 August 2018; Label: Wichita; Formats: Digital download

== Extended plays ==
List of extended plays, with details shown
Title	Details
Sticking Fingers into Sockets	Released: 3 July 2007; Label: Arts & Crafts, Wichita; Formats: Digital download
All's Well That Ends	Released: 19 July 2010; Label: Arts & Crafts, Wichita; Formats: Digital download
A Los Campesinos! Christmas	Released: 8 December 2014; Label: Heart Swells, Turnstile; Formats: CD, CS, LP, digital download, streaming
Whole Damn Body	Released: 7 May 2021; Label: Heart Swells; Formats: CS, digital download, streaming
More Hell	Released: 15 November 2024; Label: Heart Swells; Formats: digital download, streaming

== Singles ==
List of singles, with details and selected chart positions shown
Title	Year	Peak chart positions		Album
Title	Year	UK	SCO	Album
"We Throw Parties, You Throw Knives" / "Don't Tell Me to Do the Math(s)"	2007	— (Note: "We Throw Parties, You Throw Knives" did not enter the UK Singles Chart, but peaked at number 53 on the UK Physical Singles Chart Top 100.)	72	Sticking Fingers into Sockets
"You! Me! Dancing!"	2007	—	—	Sticking Fingers into Sockets
"The International Tweexcore Underground"	2007	126	47	Non-album single
"Death to Los Campesinos!"	2008	198	32	Hold On Now, Youngster...
"My Year in Lists"	2008	— (Note: "My Year in Lists" did not enter the UK Singles Chart, but peaked at number 56 on the UK Physical Singles Chart Top 100.)	—	Hold On Now, Youngster...
"The Sea Is a Good Place to Think of the Future"	2009	—	—	Romance Is Boring
"There Are Listed Buildings"	2009	—	—	Romance Is Boring
"Romance is Boring"	2010	— (Note: "Romance is Boring" did not enter the UK Singles Chart, but peaked at number six on the UK Physical Singles Chart Top 100.)	—	Romance Is Boring
"Kindle a Flame in Her Heart"	2010	—	—	Non-album single
"By Your Hand"	2011	—	—	Hello Sadness
"Hello Sadness"	2011	—	—	Hello Sadness
"Songs About Your Girlfriend"	2011	—	—	Hello Sadness
"Tiptoe Through the True Bits" (Note: This track was originally exclusive to subscribers of the band's zine Heat Rash, but was released digitally in their 2021 compilation EP Whole Damn Body.)	2012	—	—	Non-album singles
"A Doe to a Deer"	2012	—	—	Non-album singles
"What Death Leaves Behind"	2013	—	—	No Blues
"Avocado Baby"	2013	—	—	No Blues
"Little Mouth" (Note: Originally released only on the band's website in 2014, this song was remastered and re-released on streaming services in 2023.)	2014	—	—	Non-album single
"The Holly and the Ivy"	2014	—	—	A Los Campesinos! Christmas
"I Broke Up in Amarante"	2016	—	—	Sick Scenes
"5 Flucloxacillin"	2017	—	—	Sick Scenes
"The Fall of Home"	2017	—	—	Sick Scenes
"Renato Dall’Ara (2008)"	2017	—	—	Sick Scenes
"Feast of Tongues"	2024	—	–	All Hell
"A Psychic Wound"	2024	—	–	All Hell
"0898 Heartache"	2024	—	–	All Hell
"kms"	2024	—	–	All Hell

=== Heat Rash singles ===
In December 2010, the band announced the launch of a quarterly magazine, Heat Rash. The following singles were released exclusively to subscribers, until 2021 when Los Campesinos! released their fourth EP, Whole Damn Body, which compiles remastered versions of all these tracks except for singles from Heat Rash #2. Los Campesinos! also released "I Love You (But You're Boring)" in the summer of 2023.

- Heat Rash #1 (April 2011): "Light Leaves, Dark Sees" b/w "Four Seasons"
- Heat Rash #2 (December 2011): "Dreams Don't Become You" (with Zac Pennington) b/w "I Love You (But You're Boring)" (The Beautiful South cover)
- Heat Rash #3 (June 2012): "Allez Les Blues" b/w "Dumb Luck"
- Heat Rash #4 (November 2012): "She Crows" b/w "To the Boneyard"

=== Remixes ===
- Tokyo Police Club – "Tessellate" (credited only to Tom Bromley)
- Johnny Foreigner – "Criminals" (credited only to Bromley)
- White Ring – "Suffocation"
- You Say Party – "Laura Palmer's Prom"
- Parenthetical Girls – "Sympathy for Spastics"
