= The Spaces Between =

Single by Expatriate
- Released: July 23, 2007
- Recorded: 2006, Seattle
- Genre: Indie rock
- Length: 3 min 27 s
- Label: Dew Process
- Songwriters: Ben King, Chris Kollias, Damian Press
- Producer: John Goodmanson

Expatriate singles chronology
"Crazy" (2007)	"The Spaces Between" (2007)	"Missing" (2007)

"The Spaces Between" is the first United States single from Sydney band Expatriate's debut album In the Midst of This. It is generally considered their most popular song to date.

Expatriate re-recorded "The Spaces Between" for the album, taking a noticeably different approach to its Lovers le Strange EP incarnation.

The song had since been revealed as the fourth Australian single from the album. It was released as a digital download on iTunes Australia on July 23, 2007. This song is featured in Rugby 08 and Fox Sports advertisements for the 07/08 season of domestic cricket.

== Structure ==
The song is based around the guitar chord progression of Cm/Gm/G#/Fm which repeats all throughout the song. The only time the progression changes is in the songs bridge which goes G#/A#/Fm. The song does not have a chorus, however it has a coda which features they lyrics "I truly love you I do" until the song fades out.

== Track listing ==
Digital download/promo CD

1. "The Spaces Between" (Album version) – 3:28

== Video ==
In an interview with Drum Media lead singer Ben King mentioned they shot a music video for the new version of the song in the Californian desert about hours out of LA. However, when the final product was revealed it turned out to be a video featuring the band against a white backdrop with coloured lines, shapes and such with no traces of the Californian desert whatsoever. The video uses many special effects including film grains and transparency to give it an almost '80s feel. Whilst the video has been hailed by the band, it has also received criticism from their fans.

They never made a clip for the original version of the song when it was released as the band's debut single in Australia on the Lovers le Strange EP in 2005.
