= All Hell (Los Campesinos! album) =

Studio album by Los Campesinos!
- Released: July 19, 2024
- Recorded: October 2023–February 2024
- Studios: Bert Jansch, Frome; Sail Loft MusicBox, Cardiff; Tom's house, Cardiff
- Length: 49:51
- Label: Heart Swells
- Producer: Tom Bromley

Los Campesinos! chronology
Whole Damn Body (2021)	All Hell (2024)	More Hell (2024)

Singles from All Hell
- 1. "Feast of Tongues" Released: 15 May 2024; 2. "A Psychic Wound" Released: 17 May 2024; 3. "0898 HEARTACHE" Released: 11 June 2024; 4. "kms" Released: 2 July 2024

All Hell is the seventh studio album by Welsh indie rock band Los Campesinos!, released on 19 July 2024 via Heart Swells. It is their first album in seven years, following Sick Scenes (2017), as well as their first to not be issued by their longtime label Wichita. All Hell is promoted by four singles, "Feast of Tongues", "A Psychic Wound", "0898 Heartache", and "Kms", a US tour in June 2024, and a UK tour in September.

== Release and promotion ==
In an interview with the Big Issue in December 2023, band member Rob Taylor said Los Campesinos! were working on their seventh studio album. At the band's show at the Troxy in February 2024, frontman Gareth Paisey said the album was complete, set to release that summer. They also debuted their first new original song since 2017, titled "A Psychic Wound".

On 15 May 2024, the title, artwork and track listing of All Hell was announced, and its lead single "Feast of Tongues" was released. Two days later, "A Psychic Wound" was officially released as the album's second single, alongside a music video composed of footage from the Troxy show, and the announcement of a UK tour in September 2024. Two more singles were released prior to the album: "0898 Heartache" and "Kms" in June and July respectively.

A deluxe version of All Hell, featuring five acoustic versions of songs on the standard version plus a cover of "Wait" by the Secret Stars, was released digitally on 22 July 2024 for a limited time. It was later rereleased on streaming on 15 November 2024 as More Hell.

== Production ==
All Hell was recorded across three separate sessions between Frome, Somerset and Cardiff, Wales from October 2023 to February 2024. Gareth Paisey said they were not worried about deadlines, with producer Tom Bromley adopting the mantra "it's ready when it's good and we're happy with it".

According to Abby Jones of Stereogum, All Hell is the most polished-sounding Los Campesinos! album, calling back to the production of their 2013 album No Blues. Meanwhile, the title of track four and the group chant "Can we all calm the fuck down?" from "Clown Blood/Orpheus' Bobbing Head" are references to "This Is A Flag. There Is No Wind" from Romance Is Boring (2010).

== Critical reception ==
Professional ratings
Aggregate scores
Source	Rating
AnyDecentMusic?	8.3/10
Metacritic	89/100
Review scores
Source	Rating
AllMusic	4/5 stars
Clash	9/10
DIY	4.5/5 stars
Dork	4/5 stars
Exclaim!	8/10
The Line of Best Fit	9/10
Paste	7.4/10
Pitchfork	8.5/10
PopMatters	9/10
The Skinny	5/5 stars

According to the review aggregator Metacritic, All Hell received "universal acclaim" based on a weighted average score of 89 out of 100 from 12 critic scores. At AnyDecentMusic?, the album scored an 8.3 out of 10, aggregating 11 reviews.

Reviewing for DIY, Joe Goggins called the album a satisfying improvement on the band's established sound and a "triumph". For Pitchfork, reviewer Ian Cohen similarly praised All Hell as "unquestionably the ultimate Los Campesinos! album." Chris Gee of Exclaim! commended Paisey's improved vocal range to create a more dynamic sound, and his "signature inventive wordplay" which is "never overly macabre" but consistently humorous. Dan Harrison of Dork wrote that Bromley had outdone himself as producer, "crafting a sound that's both intimately familiar and refreshingly new," and further complimented Paisey's distinctive writing style. In The Skinny, Lewis Wade stated that the band, "demonstrate once more that they are masters of drilling down into the minutiae of life, spotting the danger ahead, while remaining powerless to make better choices."

All Hell was named the album of the week by indie music publication Stereogum.

== Track listing ==
All lyrics are written by Gareth Paisey; all music is composed by Tom Bromley.

All Hell track listing
No.	Title	Length
1.	"The Coin-Op Guillotine"	4:19
2.	"Holy Smoke (2005)"	2:56
3.	"A Psychic Wound"	4:02
4.	"I. Spit; or, a Bite Mark in the Shape of the Sunflower State"	1:24
5.	"Long Throes"	4:19
6.	"Feast of Tongues"	5:02
7.	"The Order of the Seasons"	3:57
8.	"II. Music for Aerial Toll House"	0:52
9.	"To Hell in a Handjob"	4:11
10.	"Clown Blood/Orpheus' Bobbing Head"	3:57
11.	"Kms"	2:35
12.	"III. Surfing a Contrail"	0:39
13.	"Moonstruck"	3:28
14.	"0898 Heartache"	5:16
15.	"Adult Acne Stigmata"	2:54
Total length:		49:51

All Hell (Deluxe) track listing
No.	Title	Length
16.	"A Psychic Wound (A Cosmic Cheque version)"	3:56
17.	"Long Throes (Punks on the Playlist version)"	3:18
18.	"To Hell in a Handjob (Shucked)"	4:02
19.	"Moonstruck (29 September 2023)"	3:30
20.	"The Coin-Op Guillotine (Sharpen the Blade)"	3:32
21.	"Wait" (the Secret Stars cover)	3:25
Total length:		71:34

Notes

- All tracks are stylised in title case, except for "kms" in all lowercase and "0898 HEARTACHE" in all caps.

== Personnel ==
Los Campesinos!

- Gareth Paisey – vocals
- Kim Paisey – lead vocals (track 11)
- Jason Adelinia
- Matthew Fidler
- Neil Turner
- Rob Taylor – sleeve image, album design, illustration
- Tom Bromley – production, string arrangements

Additional contributors

- Milo Ferreira-Hayes – engineering
- Gareth Bodman – additional engineering
- Andrei Eremin – mixing and mastering
- Holly Carpenter – violin (tracks 1, 5–7, 13)
- Eileen McDonald Sparks – cello (tracks 1, 6, 13)
- Jon Natchez – saxophone (track 9)
- Gareth Paisey – handwritten text

== Charts ==
Chart performance for All Hell
Chart (2024)	Peak position
Scottish Albums (Official Charts)	6
UK Albums (Official Charts)	14
UK Independent Albums (Official Charts)	3
