= Crazy (Expatriate song) =

Single by Expatriate
- Released: 12 May 2007
- Recorded: 2006, Seattle
- Genre: Indie rock
- Length: 3 min 36 s
- Label: Dew Process
- Songwriter(s): Ben King, Chris Kollias, Damian Press
- Producer(s): John Goodmanson

Expatriate singles chronology
"'Play a Part EP'" (2007)	"Crazy" (2007)	"The Spaces Between" (2007)

"Crazy" is the third single from Sydney band Expatriate's debut album In the Midst of This. It came as the No. 4 most played song at Australia radio on the 26 March 2007 chart. Promo CDs were issued of the song to radio stations however a physical single was never issued.

== Video ==
The video debut on Rage on 13 April 2007. It features the band performing in Melbourne bar The Croft Institute.

== Track listing ==
Digital download/Promo CD

1. "Crazy" (Radio Edit) – 3:35
