= Whole Damn Body =

2021 EP by Los Campesinos!

Compilation album by Los Campesinos!
- Released: 7 May 2021
- Recorded: 2011
- Studio: MusicLan, Girona; ElectroKitty, Seattle; John's House, Seattle; Tom and Rob's House, Cardiff
- Genre: Indie rock; emo
- Length: 26:30
- Label: Heart Swells
- Producer: John Goodmanson; Tom Bromley

Los Campesinos! chronology
Sick Scenes (2017)	Whole Damn Body (2021)	All Hell (2024)

Whole Damn Body is an extended play (EP) by Welsh indie rock band Los Campesinos!, released independently on 7 May 2021. It is a compilation of songs recorded from the sessions of their fourth studio album, Hello Sadness (2011), most of which had only been released via the band's zine or fan website. Whole Damn Body was released digitally and on cassette to coincide with the record's tenth anniversary.

== Release ==
Throughout 2011 and 2012, Los Campesinos! issued a bi-annual zine titled Heat Rash, where subscribers would receive a 7-inch single featuring two exclusive, unreleased tracks in each drop. Six out of the seven tracks on Whole Damn Body are derived from this programme. The other song, "Tiptoe Through the True Bits", was released in 2012 on the band's blog.

Whole Damn Body was released to Bandcamp on 7 May 2021, coinciding with the tenth anniversary of their fourth studio album, Hello Sadness (2011). The EP's only physical version was on cassette tape.

== Reception ==
Professional ratings
Review scores
Source	Rating
Far Out	8.6/10
Pitchfork	7.3/10

Writing for Far Out, Tyler Golsen called the record "seven tracks of high energy no bullshit rock and roll", demonstrating "the band at their wittiest, catchiest, and thoughtful best". He continued that the EP "barely gives you time to breathe, much less take in all that’s happening on the relatively short run time", praising its complex themes and imagery.

Abby Jones of music publication Pitchfork commended the record's lyricism and thematic consistency with their back catalogue, "filled with the band’s sticky hooks and guttural vocals". Nick Matthopoulos of Atwood Magazine praised Whole Damn Body for presenting "beautifully and poetically miserable highs and lows", containing "clever and emotional lyrics, a range of energy and dynamics, and equally expressive instrumentation".

== Track listing ==
All tracks are written by Gareth Paisey and Tom Bromley; tracks 5–6 co-written by Neil Turner.

No.	Title	Producer	Length
1.	"Allez Les Blues"	John Goodmanson	3:50
2.	"Dumb Luck"	Goodmanson	3:03
3.	"She Crows (Documented Minor Emotional Breakdown #4)"	Goodmanson; Tom Bromley	4:01
4.	"Tiptoe Through the True Bits"	Goodmanson	5:17
5.	"Four Seasons"	Bromley	3:23
6.	"To the Boneyard"	Goodmanson; Bromley	3:44
7.	"Light Leaves, Dark Sees, Pt. I"	Bromley	3:09
Total length:			26:30

Original releases

- Heat Rash edition No. 1 (April 2011) contained "Light Leaves, Dark Sees, Pt. I" and "Four Seasons"
- Heat Rash edition No. 3 (June 2012) contained "Allez Les Blues" and "Dumb Luck"
- Heat Rash edition No. 4 (November 2012) contained "She Crows" and "To the Boneyard".

== Personnel ==
Musicians

- Los Campesinos!, specifically:
  - Tom Bromley – writing; producer, mixing, recording (tracks 3, 5–7); brass arrangement
  - Gareth Paisey – writing, vocals
  - Neil Turner – writing (tracks 5–6), guitar
  - Rob Taylor – cover art
  - Harriet Coleman – vocals (tracks 4–5, 7), violin (tracks 5, 7)
- Samantha Boshnack – trumpet, flugelhorn (track 4)
- Nelson Bell – trombone, tuba (track 4)
- Jherek Bischoff – brass arrangement

Technical

- John Goodmanson – producer, mixing, recording (tracks 1–4, 6)
- Jose Luis Molero – engineering
- Eric Corson – engineering
- Simon Francis – mastering
