= There Are Listed Buildings =

Single by Los Campesinos!

from the album Romance is Boring
- Released: 2 November 2009
- Recorded: 2009
- Genre: Indie pop; twee pop
- Length: 2:54
- Label: Wichita
- Songwriter(s): Gareth Campesinos!
- Producer(s): John Goodmanson

Los Campesinos! singles chronology
"The Sea Is A Good Place To Think Of The Future" (2009)	"There Are Listed Buildings" (2009)	"Romance Is Boring" (2010)

"There Are Listed Buildings" is a song by Welsh indie pop band Los Campesinos!, released on 2 November 2009 as the lead single to their third studio album Romance Is Boring. It was initially distributed via digital download and as a seven-inch single only available on their 2009 UK tour. Frontman Gareth Paisey said the track was influenced by the work of Death Cab for Cutie.

== Reception ==
Writing for Consequence, Alex Young said the track was "Broken Social Scene-esque" and "features an awesome horn part". Joseph Lynch of Entertainment Weekly said the track "brings back the life-affirming marriage of punk energy and twee songcraft from their 2008 debut".

The song was voted first place by listeners of Dandelion Radio in the 2009 Festive Fifty.

== Music video ==
A music video for "There Are Listed Buildings" was released alongside the track on YouTube via Arts & Crafts. It was directed by Aaron Brown and Ben Chappell. In 2020, frontman Gareth Paisey reflected: "Music video for this [song] isn’t very good. I think I only ever watched it once".
