= All's Well That Ends =

EP by Los Campesinos!
- Released: 19 July 2010
- Recorded: June 2010
- Genre: Acoustic, indie pop
- Length: 16:19
- Label: Wichita Recordings
- Producer: John Goodmanson

Los Campesinos! chronology
Romance Is Boring (2010)	All's Well That Ends (2010)	Hello Sadness (2011)

All's Well That Ends is the second extended play by Welsh eight-piece band Los Campesinos!. It was recorded in June 2010 and features reworkings of four songs from the band's third album Romance Is Boring.

It was released on limited edition 10" vinyl on 19 July 2010, was made available from independent record stores, and was also released on iTunes. It is the first release from the band to feature Rob Taylor and vocals from Kim Paisey, and the final release featuring drummer Ollie Briggs before he left the band in June 2010. A video of the recording process was also released to coincide with the EP filmed and edited by Ellen Waddell.

Marc Hogan, for music publication Pitchfork, gave the EP a 7.6/10 rating, writing that it "sheds clearer light on some of the group's most bewilderingly complex songs, without sacrificing intricacy or exposing too many shortcomings".

A remixed and remastered version of the EP was released on 14 February 2020 as part of tenth anniversary celebrations for Romance Is Boring.

The EP is completely acoustic, aside from a short section in Romance Is Boring (Princess Version) which features a slide guitar part in place of the noise guitar solo in the original version.

== Track listing ==
1. "Romance Is Boring (Princess Version)" – 3:22
2. "Letters From Me to Charlotte (RSVP)" – 3:45
3. "Straight In at 101/It's Never Enough" – 4:16
4. "(All's Well That Ends) In Medias Res" – 4:56

== Personnel ==
Adapted from Bandcamp.

- Los Campesinos! – performing; in particular:
  - Tom Bromley – writing, mixing
  - Gareth Paisey – writing
- Simon Francis – mastering
