= Romance Is Boring =

Studio album by Los Campesinos!
- Released: 26 January 2010
- Recorded: February–June 2009
- Studios: Carriage House, Stamford; Two Sticks Audio, Seattle
- Genres: Indie rock; noise pop; emo
- Length: 48:22
- Labels: Wichita; Arts & Crafts (Note: Released under Arts & Crafts in North America.)
- Producer: John Goodmanson

Los Campesinos! chronology
We Are Beautiful, We Are Doomed (2008)	Romance Is Boring (2010)	All's Well That Ends (2010)

Singles from Romance Is Boring
- 1. "There Are Listed Buildings" Released: 2 November 2009; 2. "Romance Is Boring" Released: 15 February 2010

Romance Is Boring is the third studio album by Welsh indie pop band Los Campesinos!, released via Wichita on 26 January 2010. The album's maximalist production, unconventional structure and particularly demoralising themes marked a departure from the band's previous twee pop sound.

Los Campesinos! recorded Romance Is Boring in early 2009 with producer John Goodmanson in Stamford and Seattle. Desiring to build a complex soundscape, the band experimented with strings and brass instruments for the first time. As the album's narrator through three distinct acts, lead vocalist Gareth Paisey wrote about "the death and decay of the human body, sex, lost love, mental breakdown, football and, ultimately, that there probably isn’t a light at the end of the tunnel".

Two singles were issued before the album's release: "The Sea Is a Good Place to Think of the Future" and "There Are Listed Buildings". Romance Is Boring debuted at number 92 on the UK Albums Chart and received widespread critical acclaim, appearing on the annual lists of music publications including DIY and The Line of Best Fit. Four of its tracks would be reworked on the All's Well That Ends EP in 2010. Romance Is Boring remains one of the most highly regarded albums in the band's catalogue.

== Background ==
Los Campesinos! released their first two studio albums, Hold on Now, Youngster... and We Are Beautiful, We Are Doomed, in 2008, and "started amassing a devout fanbase". In 2009, they performed a 21-show tour across North America alongside punk band Titus Adronicus, and began to play at bigger venues including at the music festivals Lollapalooza and Coachella in the same year.

== Composition ==
=== Production ===
The creative process for Romance Is Boring would begin with lead guitarist Tom Bromley recording a demo and sending it to the other six members. He was inspired by the work of Pavement, Guided by Voices, Blur and Modest Mouse. Recordings took place in the United States from January to June 2009 in two studios: Carriage House in Stamford, Connecticut, and Two Sticks Audio in Seattle, Washington. John Goodmanson returned as producer after previously handling We Are Beautiful, We Are Doomed; he also mixed the album at Monnow Valley Studio in Rockfield, Wales.

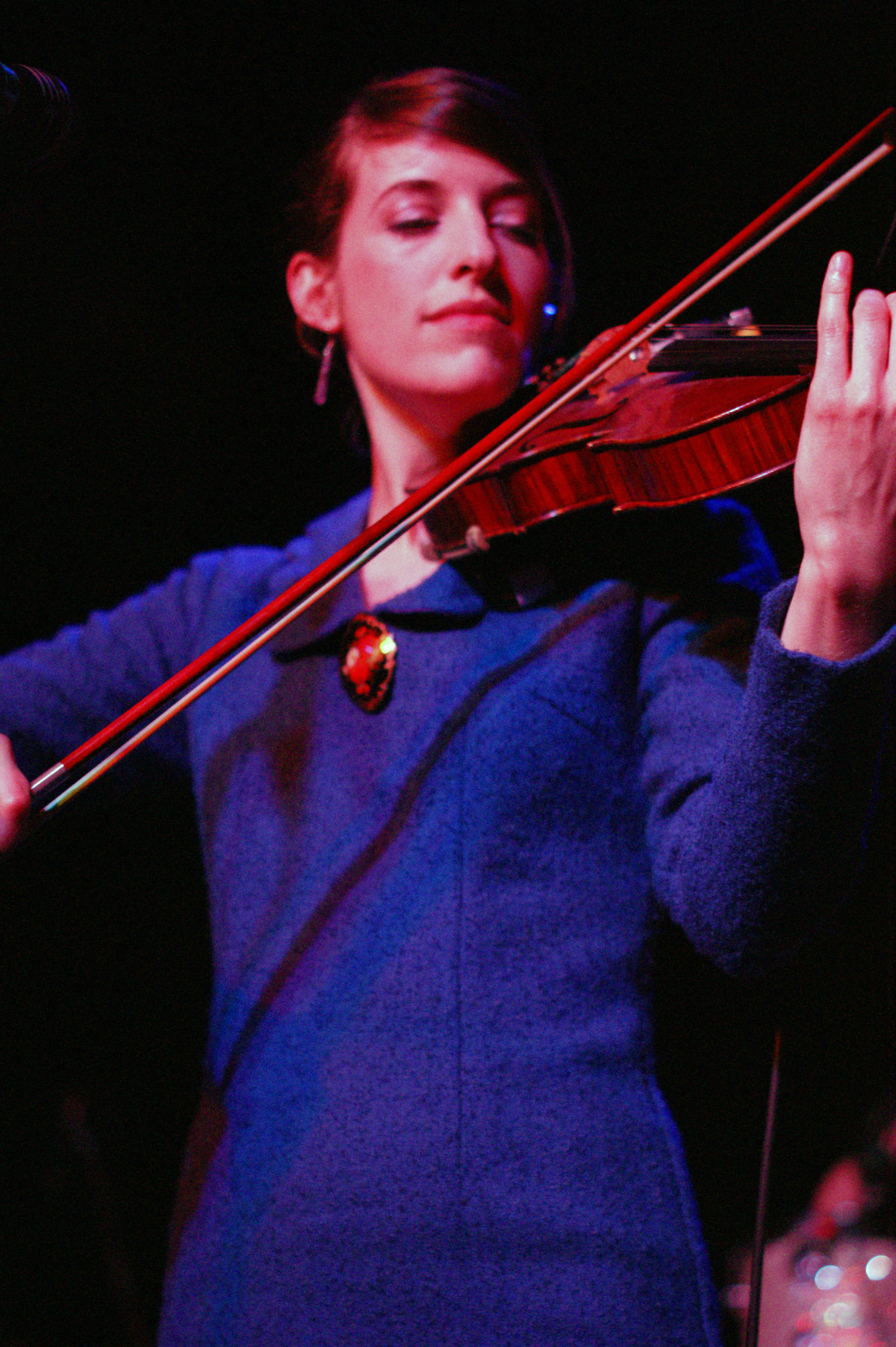
Band violinist Harriet Coleman contributed string arrangements, adding to the album's maximalist sound.

Romance Is Boring showcases an expansion in the band's sound. A maximalist album, it is characterised by "densely-knotted and gnashing layers of instrumentation". Bromley said their goal was to "give the songs as a whole a number of dimensions that will reveal themselves slowly through repeated listens." Strings and brass instruments feature for the first time in a Los Campesinos! album. It also includes guest appearances from Jamie Stewart of Xiu Xiu, Zac Pennington of Parenthetical Girls, and Jherek Bischoff of the Dead Science.

Jordan Sargent of PopMatters said the album "represents how sonic exploration can actually go right". Writing for NME, Lisa Wright said the album is "incredibly structurally cohesive" and "blows anything they’ve previously released out of the water in terms of textural intricacy, technical prowess and general experimentation". Rob Hakimian of The Line of Best Fit continued, that despite the "when the verses are in-your-face and unhospitable, the songs glide into beautifully anthemic choruses, where the melodies shine clear and bright".

After Romance Is Boring was recorded, founding keyboardist Aleksandra Berditchevskaia left the band to continue her studies. She was replaced by Kim Paisey, the sister of frontman Gareth, in September 2009.

=== Lyricism ===
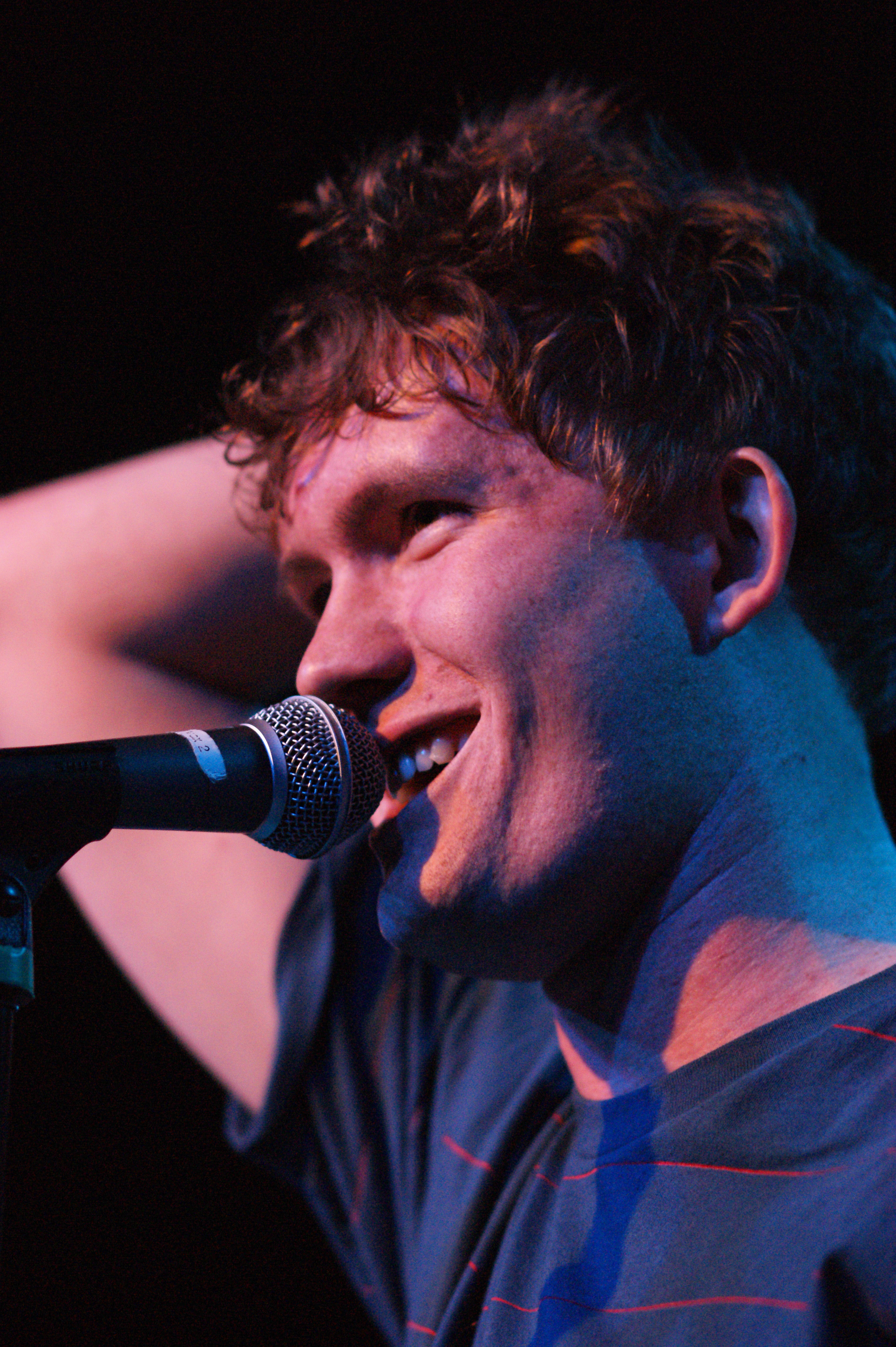
The album's lyrics are written from the perspective of frontman Gareth Paisey.

For Romance Is Boring, Gareth Paisey wrote in prose before turning his words into songs. He wrote several songs, like the title track, at the last minute while the group was recording. The album's central tenets include death, football, beer and sex. While the band's first two records dabbled with these themes, Paisey reflected: "it’s the sex that really stands out from this collection of songs." Paisey said it was the first time the band had attempted to create a cohesive concept album with running musical and lyrical themes. The album's track listing is split into three distinctive acts.

As the narrator of each song, Paisey represents himself as an insecure, sexually frustrated and bitter man. Writing for PopMatters, Evan Sawdey said that tracks occasionally detail "the build-up and deflation of one man’s fragile ego". Paisey has clarified he's always been the butt of the joke: "I can’t think of many examples where it’s been the person that I’ve been singing about that has come out of the situation looking worse than me."

The bonus track "Too Many Flesh Suppers" was described by Paisey as the darkest song the band had ever written and recorded, and "the biggest departure from anything [they'd] done before".

The band cite author B. S. Johnson as one of their influences: the title of "Too Many Flesh Suppers", and lyrics from "Coda: A Burn Scar in the Shape of the Sooner State" and the title track are taken from a title of a poem, and from lines from his poem See the Old Lady Decently and novel Trawl (then Paisey's favourite novel) respectively.

== Release and promotion ==
A promotional single for the album, "The Sea Is a Good Place to Think of the Future", was released on 9 September 2009. A "slow-building, atmospherically-arranged epic about death", the track marked a sonic departure from their previous work. It was named a Best New Track on Pitchfork, with critic Ryan Dombal calling the song "the work of a band, not a bunch of enthusiastic devotees". The lead single, "There Are Listed Buildings", was issued on 2 November 2009, when it was announced the band's third studio album, Romance Is Boring, would release on 1 February 2010. Its cover art was designed by Cari Ann Wayman. Three months before its official release, in December, the full album was leaked online. Paisey wrote a statement on the band's blog talking of his disappointment and anger at the fact, saying: "It really feels like ripping something out of my chest".

The album's title track was released as a 7" single on 15 February 2010, which was backed with "Too Many Flesh Suppers", a then-unreleased song. The B-side was later released as a free download on the band's blog on 30 November 2010.

From April 2010, the band embarked on a North American tour supporting the album. The following month, they played at several festivals across the United Kingdom, before performing a second circuit across the United States in October. While on tour, Paisey suffered from a mild concussion and sprained wrist after he leaped from the stage at the Summer Sundae.

In July 2010, the band released All's Well That Ends, an extended play featuring reworked, acoustic versions of four songs from Romance Is Boring.

=== 2020 reissue ===
In February 2020, to celebrate the tenth anniversary of Romance Is Boring, Los Campesinos! digitally released a remastered edition of the album featuring "Too Many Flesh Suppers" as a bonus track. The band also released an 86-page zine detailing the album's writing, recording and release. Further, the band played two shows over Valentine's Day at the Islington Assembly Hall in London, where they performed the entire album in full.

== Critical reception ==
Professional ratings
Aggregate scores
Source	Rating
AnyDecentMusic?	7.1/10
Metacritic	75/100
Review scores
Source	Rating
AllMusic	2.5/5 stars
Clash	8/10
Consequence of Sound	4/5 stars
DIY	4.5/5 stars
Drowned in Sound	8/10
NME	8/10
Pitchfork	8.3/10
PopMatters	9/10
Spin	3.5/5 stars
Under the Radar	7/10

The album debuted to widespread acclaim. According to Metacritic, the album has an average score of 75 based on the scores from 28 mainstream reviewers.

Many music outlets claimed Romance Is Boring was the band's best album, or one that was a major improvement compared to their previous work. Calling it "an absolutely astounding album", Gareth O'Malley for DIY said it stands as "a rare example of a band that have improved with each release." Tony Heywood of London magazine MusicOMH concluded "Romance Is Boring is a triumph, a glistening, breathless success", writing the band were "at the peak of their considerable powers". Matt Latham for Set The Tape called the album "the crowning piece of their discography" and a "masterpiece of songwriting and rewarding repeated listens".

Writing for Pitchfork, Paul Thompson praised Paisey's relatable and honest lyricism, and called it a matured release from the band. He particularly commended the album's production which displays sonic experimentation without cluttering the mix. Jordan Sargent of PopMatters concluded that "Los Campesinos! have, in short time, found their sound."

Other reviews were less positive, like British music magazine Uncut writing that "the band have beefed up their sound, at the expense of their spindly charm." Tim Sendra of AllMusic gave Romance Is Boring a scathing review, calling it an "over-cooked, under-performing album that ultimately falls short of their first two efforts," calling Paisey's songwriting poor and his voice "annoying more often than charming".

== Legacy ==
For the ten year anniversary of Romance Is Boring in 2020, several publications including The Line of Best Fit and PopMatters published retrospectives on the album. Writing for Getintothis, Matthew Eland claimed it remained "their most accomplished record" a decade on, and called the track "I Just Sighed. I Just Sighed, Just So You Know" the group's best song. On the remaster, Sawdey concluded: "It’s a remarkable achievement ... and it still stings a decade down the line". Hakimian wrote that the record "set a path for what was to come in their music in the following years" – Paisey agreed, claiming that he finds Sick Scenes (2017) to be more similar to their 2010 output compared to their debut, Hold on Now, Youngster... (2008). In 2020, Vulture described the album as the band's "most divisive".

In 2020, Joe Goggins for The Skinny wrote that Romance Is Boring was a "unsung cornerstone of the emo revival" and a crucial contribution to the genre, citing its raw lyricism underrated beneath "oblique football references and the Heatonesque colloquialisms".

=== Accolades ===
Romance Is Boring was featured several times in various music publications' year-end lists. DIY placed the album at number 15 in their annual compilation, and the publication's readers voted it in at number eight in a separate list. Meanwhile, NME called Romance Is Boring one of 2010's most underrated albums. It also featured in the lists of Consequence of Sound, Drowned in Sound and The Line of Best Fit.

List of appearances on year-end lists
Publication	Accolade	Rank	Ref.
Consequence of Sound	Top 100 Albums of 2010	89	
Consequence of Sound	Top 35 Albums to Buy In 2010	—N/a	
DIY	Albums of the Year	15	
DIY	Readers' Album of the Year	8	
Drowned in Sound	Albums of The Year 2010	32	
The Line of Best Fit	Albums of 2010	12	
NME	Most Underrated Albums of 2010	—N/a	
Sputnikmusic	Top 50 Albums of 2010	34	

== Track listing ==
All tracks are written by Gareth Paisey; tracks 4 and 11 co-written by Aleksandra Berditchevskaia.

Standard edition
No.	Title	Length
1.	"In Medias Res"	4:42
2.	"There Are Listed Buildings"	2:54
3.	"Romance Is Boring"	2:35
4.	"We've Got Your Back (Documented Minor Emotional Breakdown #2)"	4:29
5.	"(Plan A)"	2:02
6.	"200–102"	0:53
7.	"Straight in at 101"	3:55
8.	"Who Fell Asleep In"	4:11
9.	"I Warned You: Do Not Make an Enemy of Me"	2:47
10.	"Heart Swells/100–1"	0:46
11.	"I Just Sighed. I Just Sighed, Just So You Know"	4:38
12.	"A Heat Rash in the Shape of the Show Me State; or, Letters from Me to Charlotte"	3:43
13.	"The Sea Is a Good Place to Think of the Future"	4:24
14.	"This Is a Flag. There Is No Wind"	3:28
15.	"Coda: A Burn Scar in the Shape of the Sooner State"	2:52
Total length:		48:14

Remastered edition
No.	Title	Length
16.	"Too Many Flesh Suppers"	4:49
Total length:		53:15

== Personnel ==
Credits are reflective of liner notes.

Musicians

- Los Campesinos!, specifically:
  - Tom Bromley – music, string arrangements
  - Gareth Paisey – writing
  - Aleksandra Berditchevskaia – writing (tracks 4, 11)
  - Harriet Coleman – string arrangements
  - Kim Paisey – shruti box, piccolo
- Zac Pennington – vocals
- Jamie Stewart – vocals
- Eric Corson – vocals
- Jherek Bischoff – vocals, trombone, double bass
- Izaak Mills – saxophone, flute
- Samantha Boshnack – trumpet, flugel horn

Additional personnel

- John Goodmanson – recording, mixing, producer
- Eric Corson – engineering
- Michael Lerner – engineering
- Jackson Long – engineering
- Tom Manning – assistant
- Guy Davie – mastering
- Anna Wayman – cover images

== Charts ==
Weekly chart performance for Romance Is Boring
Charts (2010)	Peak position	Ref.
UK Albums Chart	92	
US Top Heatseekers	3	
US Top Independent	28	

== Release history ==
List of release dates and formats for Romance Is Boring
Date	Country	Label	Catalogue
26 January 2010	United States, Canada	Arts & Crafts	A&C050
1 February 2010	United Kingdom	Wichita	WEBB239
3 February 2010	Japan	Hostess	N/A
