= A Los Campesinos! Christmas =

EP by Los Campesinos!
- Released: 8 December 2014
- Genre: Indie pop, Christmas music
- Length: 24:34
- Label: Turnstile/Heart Swells

Los Campesinos! chronology
No Blues (2013)	A Los Campesinos! Christmas (2014)	Sick Scenes (2017)

A Los Campesinos! Christmas is a Christmas EP released by Welsh indie pop band Los Campesinos! on 8 December 2014. The record compiles Christmas songs from past years, in addition to new tracks and a cover of Mud's 1974 Christmas number one "Lonely This Christmas".

It was released through Turnstile and Heart Swells via iTunes and on 12-inch vinyl, pressed on white, with a CD copy and Christmas card (designed by Rob Taylor) signed by the band included. In 2021, the band re-released the EP on cassette.

== Track listing ==
No.	Title	Length
1.	"When Christmas Comes"	3:51
2.	"A Doe to a Deer"	4:03
3.	"The Holly and the Ivy"	4:56
4.	"Kindle a Flame in Her Heart"	4:03
5.	"The Trains Don’t Run (It’s Christmas Day)"	2:50
6.	"Lonely This Christmas"	4:54
Total length:		24:34

== Charts ==
Chart performance for A Los Campesinos! Christmas
Chart (2022–2025)	Peak position
UK Independent Albums (OCC)	28
