= Hello Sadness =

Studio album by Los Campesinos!
- Released: 14 November 2011 (UK); 15 November 2011 (US/CAN)
- Recorded: 2011
- Studio: Cardiff Music Studio, Cardiff; ElectroKitty, Seattle; MusicLan Studios, Girona
- Genre: Indie pop, indie rock, emo
- Length: 40:06
- Label: Wichita, Arts & Crafts
- Producer: John Goodmanson

Los Campesinos! chronology
All's Well That Ends (2010)	Hello Sadness (2011)	No Blues (2013)

Singles from Hello Sadness
- 1. "By Your Hand" Released: 6 September 2011; 2. "Hello Sadness" Released: 21 November 2011; 3. "Songs About Your Girlfriend" Released: 19 March 2012

Hello Sadness is the fourth studio album by Welsh indie pop band Los Campesinos!. It was recorded during summer 2011 in a small studio near Figueres, Spain, and was produced by John Goodmanson. It is the band's first release to feature new drummer Jason (formerly of The Ghost Frequency) and the first full-length release to feature new members Rob and Kim, who had previously first appeared on the All's Well That Ends EP in 2010. The album is also the group's final release to feature violinist Harriet, who left before the album's release, and bassist Ellen who left the band in December 2012.

The album was released on 14 November 2011 in the United Kingdom and 15 November 2011 in the United States and Canada. In August 2012, the album shortlisted for the 2012 Welsh Music Prize.

== Release ==
The album's pre-release bundle featured the CD, a digital download, a T-shirt, a DVD and an exclusive release called Hold on Now, Youngster...: The Demos, which featured demo tracks from the recording of the band's 2008 debut album Hold on Now, Youngster... as well as the non-album rarity "How I Taught Myself to Scream" and the previously unreleased track "No Tetris".

The general release of the album featured the CD and a DVD featuring a documentary about the making of the album.

Professional ratings
Review scores
Source	Rating
AllMusic	3.5/5 stars
The A.V. Club	B−
Consequence of Sound	4/5 stars
Pitchfork	8.0/10
SPIN	8/10

== Track listing ==
1. "By Your Hand" – 4:07
2. "Songs About Your Girlfriend" – 3:18
3. "Hello Sadness" – 4:13
4. "Life Is a Long Time" – 4:21
5. "Every Defeat a Divorce (Three Lions)" – 5:04
6. "Hate for the Island" – 2:20
7. "The Black Bird, the Dark Slope" – 3:55
8. "To Tundra" – 4:11
9. "Baby I Got the Death Rattle" – 4:13
10. "Light Leaves, Dark Sees Pt. II" – 4:20

== Personnel ==
Adapted from Bandcamp.

Musicians

- Los Campesinos!
  - Gareth Paisey – vocals, writing
  - Kim Paisey – vocals, keyboards
  - Robert Taylor – vocals, guitar, keyboards
  - Ellen Waddell – bass, vocals
  - Neil Turner – guitar
  - Tom Bromley – guitar, brass arrangements, writing
  - Jason Adelinia – drums, percussion
  - Harriet Coleman – string arrangements, violin, piano
- Benjamin Kaminski – viola
- Jimmy Ottley – cello
- Samantha Boshnack – trumpet, flugelhorn
- Nelson Bell – trombone, tuba
- Jherek Bischoff – double bass, brass arrangements
- Tom Bischoff – brass arrangements

Technical

- John Goodmanson – mixing, recording, producing
- Jose Luis Molero – assistant engineering
- Eric Corson – assistant engineering
- Andrew Lewis – producer
