= Stories and Alibis =

Studio album by Matchbook Romance
- Released: September 23, 2003
- Recorded: 2003
- Genres: Emo; post-hardcore; pop-punk; alternative rock
- Length: 46:55
- Label: Epitaph
- Producer: Joe Barresi

Matchbook Romance chronology
West For Wishing (2003)	Stories and Alibis (2003)	Voices (2006)

Singles from Stories and Alibis
- 1. "Promise" Released: June 28, 2003; 2. "My Eyes Burn" Released: 2004

Professional ratings
Review scores
Source	Rating
AllMusic	3/5 stars
Drowned in Sound	8/10
Ox-Fanzine	6/10
Punknews.org	2.5/5 stars
Rock Hard	7/10

Stories and Alibis is the debut studio album by Matchbook Romance. The album was released in September 23, 2003, on Epitaph Records.

== Background ==
Matchbook Romance was formed by Andrew Jordan and Ryan Kienle in 1997 under the name Fizzlewink. The initial band line up consisted of Andrew as vocalist and rhythm guitarist, Ryan on bass and backing vocals, and Jon Dunham on drums. Two years later, PJ Manzo joined on lead guitar in summer of 1999. This period of the band was heavily influenced by the sound of bands like NOFX, Bad Religion, and Pennywise. After three years of playing with Fizzlewink, Jon decided to step down in April 2000. He was replaced by Adam Bock in July 2000, and soon after Adam joined, the band began recording an independent album called "Who's Listening" that was released on February 2, 2001. A few months after this release, Ryan "Judas" DePaolo was recruited as Fizzlewink's third guitarist, and with him, they started recording new songs. However, soon afterward, Adam was replaced by Aaron Stern (circa August 2001). This new line up prompted the band to change the name to "The Getaway", and with the new material and songs that they wrote over the prior months, the band soon began promoting itself on the internet, leading to posts on PunkNews.org about their music. When Epitaph Records president Brett Gurewitz caught on with one of these posts and decided to download "Ex Marks the Spot", one of the new songs that the band had written, he decided to contact Andrew to sign them and make a record deal with them. After being officially signed, they changed their name once again – this time to Matchbook Romance – in order to avoid a name conflict with The Getaway, a Canadian based pop-punk band. After resolving this legal issue, they started writing their debut LP under the direction of Brett. It is reported that Brett initially contacted the band and asked them to not release what was supposed to be The Getaway's debut EP titled "...If All Else Fails", which was scheduled to be released on May 24, 2002, so in return, he offered them guidance to record a full length album. Around this time, PJ decided to leave the band due to creative differences and because he wasn't happy with the direction that the band was going. He then went on to join melodic hardcore and punk band River's End.

Pre–production was held at Mets Studio Rehearsal in North Hollywood, California. Joe Barresi produced and engineered the album, while additional production was done on "The Greatest Fall" by Epitaph Records owner Brett Gurewitz. Pete Martinez acted as an assistant engineer and did additional editing at Sound City Studios in Los Angeles, California, while Jeff Moses was the assistant engineer at Larrabee East Studio in North Hollywood. John Naclerio recorded the vocals for "The Greatest Fall" at Nada Studios in New Windsor, New York. "Playing for Keeps", "Promise" and "She'll Never Understand" were mixed at Larrabee East by Barresi. Gene Grimaldi then mastered the album at Oasis Mastering.

== Track listing ==
No.	Title	Length
1.	"Introduction" (instrumental)	1:35
2.	"Your Stories, My Alibis"	4:46
3.	"Playing for Keeps"	3:46
4.	"Promise"	4:17
5.	"Lovers & Liars"	3:22
6.	"Tiger Lily"	3:04
7.	"Shadows Like Statues"	4:30
8.	"My Eyes Burn"	4:20
9.	"She'll Never Understand"	3:59
10.	"If All Else Fails"	5:48
11.	"Stay Tonight"	3:23
12.	"The Greatest Fall"	4:05
Total length:		46:55

Hidden track
No.	Title	Length
1.	"Untitled"	3:08

== Personnel ==
Personnel per booklet.

Matchbook Romance

- Andrew Jordan – vocals, guitar
- Ryan "Judas" DePaolo – guitar, vocals
- Ryan Kienle – bass guitar, vocals
- Aaron Stern – drums

Additional musicians

- David Palmer – keyboards

Production and design

- Joe Barresi – producer, engineer and mixing
- Pete Martinez – assistant engineer, additional editing
- Jeff Moses – assistant engineer
- Brett Gurewitz – additional production (track 12)
- John Naclerio – vocal recording (track 12)
- Gene Grimaldi – mastering
- Bob Lenz – art direction, design
- Matt Govaere – art direction, design

== Charts ==
Album – Billboard (United States)

Year	Chart	Position
2003	Heatseekers	30
2003	Top Independent Albums	31
