= The Golden Spike =

Studio album by Sky Larkin
- Released: 2 February 2009
- Recorded: Spring 2008 in Seattle
- Genre: Indie rock
- Length: 36.04
- Label: Wichita
- Producer: John Goodmanson

Sky Larkin chronology
The Golden Spike (2009)	Kaleide (2010)

Professional ratings
Review scores
Source	Rating
BBC	(favorable)
The Guardian	3/5 stars
musicOMH	4/5 stars
NME	7/10
Rock Sound	8/10
Yahoo! Music UK	7/10 stars

The Golden Spike is the debut album by English band Sky Larkin, released on 2 February 2009.

== Track listing ==
No.	Title	Length
1.	"Fossil, I"	2:20
2.	"Pica"	1:30
3.	"Molten"	2:52
4.	"Antibodies"	3:31
5.	"Octopus '08"	2:50
6.	"Somersault"	2:59
7.	"Beeline"	2:38
8.	"One of Two"	3:54
9.	"Matador"	3:53
10.	"Geography"	3:02
11.	"Summit"	3:36
12.	"Keep Sakes"	2:42
13.	"Untitled (Hidden Track)"	0:47
