= Katie Harkin =

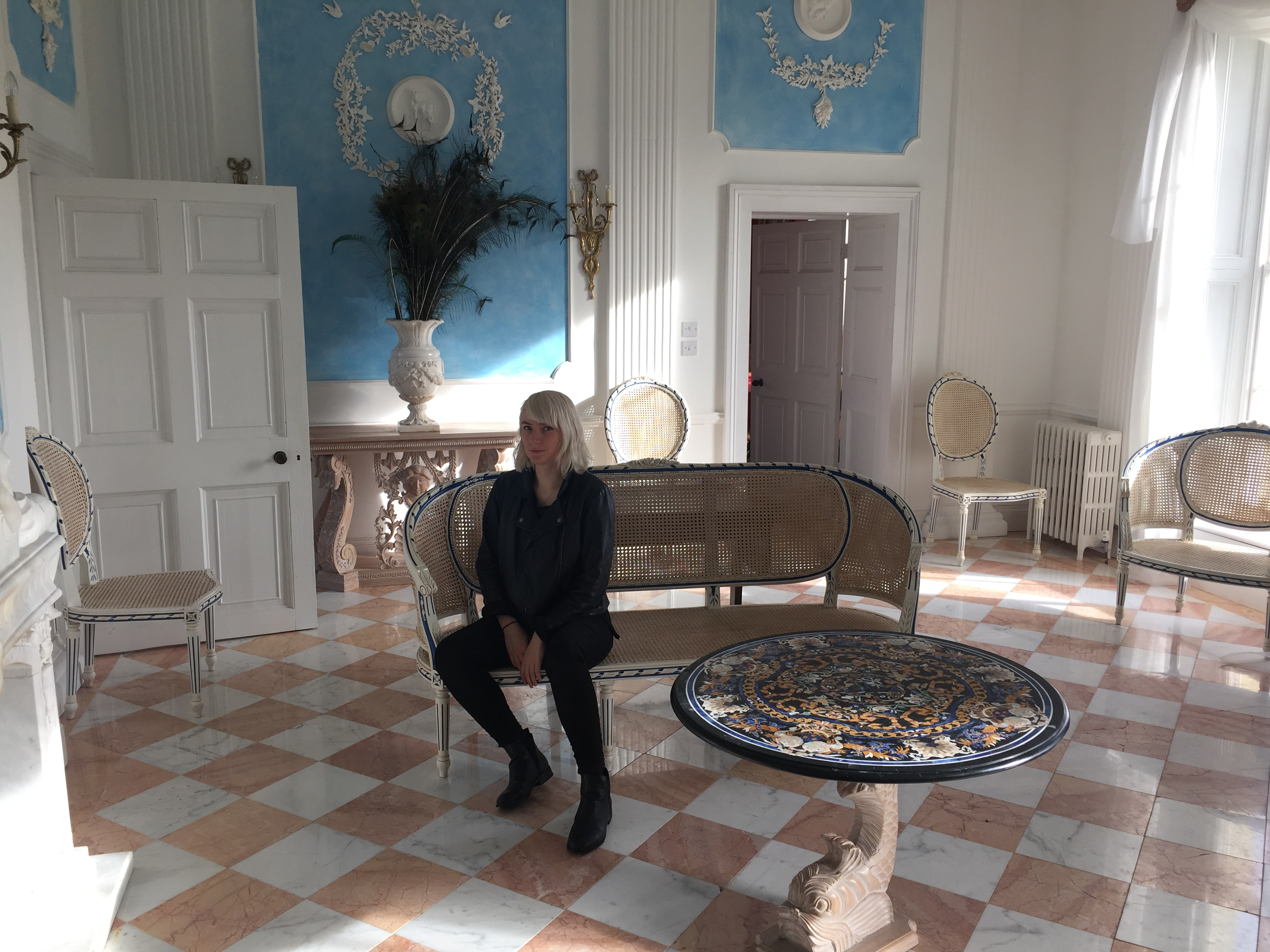

Background information
- Born: 12 April 1986 (age 40)
- Genres: Indie rock
- Occupations: Musician; songwriter
- Instruments: Guitar; vocals; keyboards
- Years active: 2005–present
- Website: handmirror.bandcamp.com

Katie Harkin (born 12 April 1986) is an English musician and songwriter, originally from Leeds, England. She was the vocalist and guitarist for Sky Larkin and a touring member with Courtney Barnett, Sleater-Kinney and Wild Beasts. She has since released two solo albums under the name Harkin.

== Career ==
Harkin was a founding member of Sky Larkin from 2005 to 2014, performing guitar, keyboards and vocals while acting as the band's main songwriter. She formed the band while attending university with her childhood friend Nestor Matthews. The group released two singles on Dance To The Radio and three albums on Wichita Recordings.

In 2011 Harkin toured with Wild Beasts in support of their album Smother and composed the score for 2016 Turner Prize winner Helen Martin's CGI animation Dust and Piranhas for The Serpentine Gallery in London.

Beginning in 2015, she was a touring member of Sleater-Kinney, appearing on their live album Live in Paris.

In 2016, Harkin worked with Waxahatchee on their album Out in the Storm, performing on the album and also contributing to some of the songwriting process. She also toured with Flock of Dimes.

In 2017, Harkin toured with Kurt Vile and Courtney Barnett in their backing band to promote their album Lotta Sea Lice. She also soundtracked British comedian Josie Long's podcast All Of The Planet's Wonders Shown In Detail the same year.

In 2018, Harkin toured with Barnett in her backing band in the US and Europe to promote her album Tell Me How You Really Feel.

On 24 April 2020 Harkin released her first solo album, Harkin. Her second album, Honeymoon Suite, was released in June 2022 on her own Hand Mirror label.

== Personal life ==
Harkin married Kate Hewett in 2020. The couple have a daughter. Their first daughter, Alba Harkett, was stillborn in January 2023.
