= In the Midst of This =

Studio album by Expatriate
- Released: 21 April 2007
- Recorded: 2006, Seattle
- Studio: Robert Lang (Shoreline, Washington)
- Genre: Indie rock
- Label: Dew Process
- Producer: John Goodmanson; Damien Press

Expatriate chronology
Play a Part EP (2007)	In the Midst of This (2007)

Professional ratings
Review scores
Source	Rating
Rock Sound	(7/10)

In the Midst of This is the debut album by Sydney-based Australian indie rock band Expatriate. The band had previously revealed on Myspace that they hoped to have the album released by February 2007, however it was released in Australia on 21 April. It featured in the Australian ARIA album chart for one week, peaking at #38.

== Artwork ==
The cover artwork for the album was designed and made by Jonathan Zowada who also did the artwork for the Play a Part EP. It shows a red flag blowing against the blue sky, however if you look at the picture another way, the red flag looks like a face from its side.

== Track listing ==
1. "Get Out, Give in"
2. "Crazy"
3. "Gotta Get Home"
4. "The Spaces Between"
5. "In the Night"
6. "Play a Part"
7. "Shooting Star"
8. "You Were There"
9. "Only Wanna Love Ya"
10. "Deadma'"
11. "Blackbird"
12. "Times Like These"
13. "Are You Awake?"

== Charts ==
Chart (2007)	Peak position
Australian Albums (ARIA)	38
