= Sky Larkin =

English indie rock band

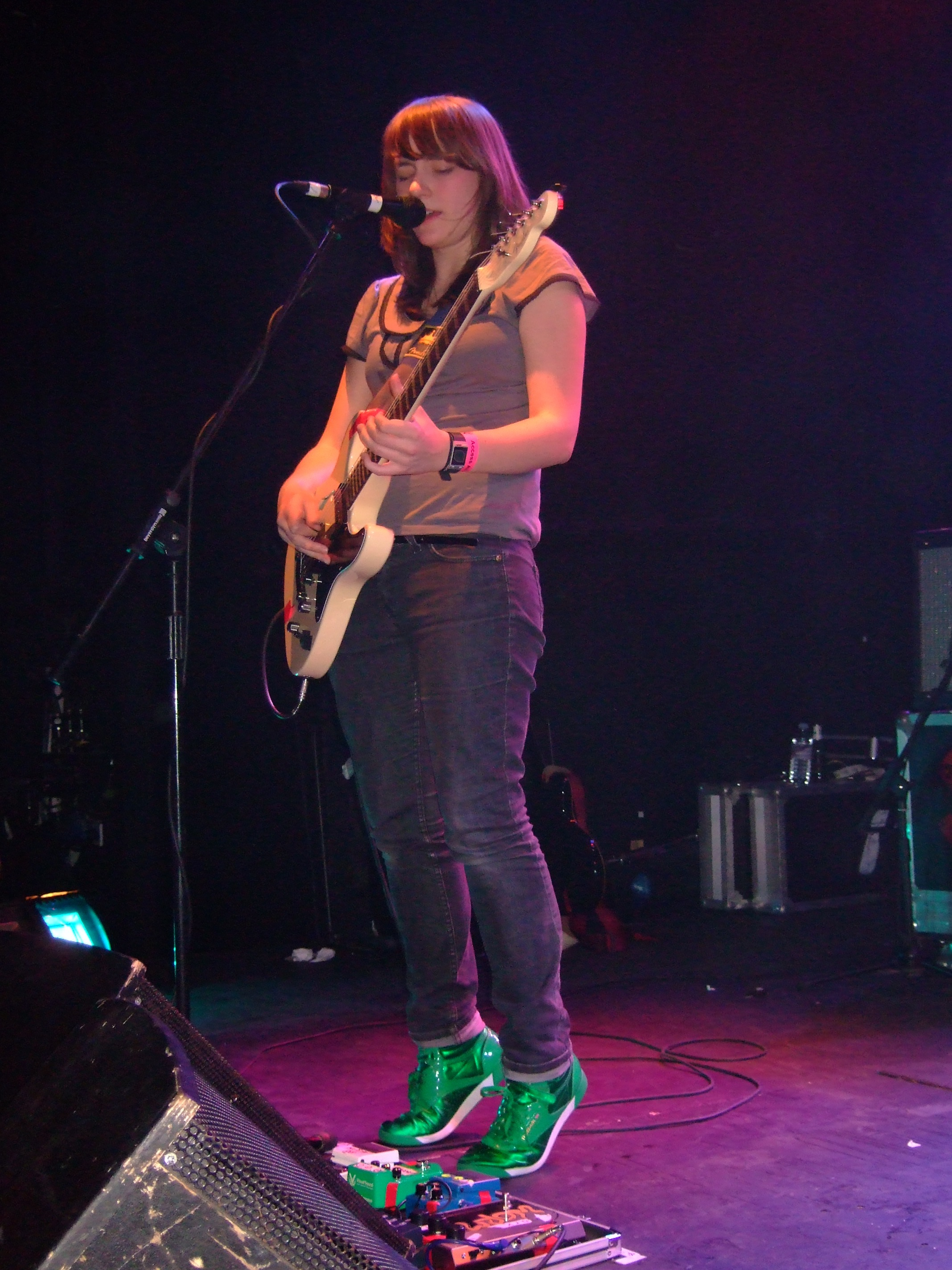
- Katie Harkin performing with Sky Larkin at the ICA in London, 29 January 2009

Background information
- Origin: Leeds, West Yorkshire, England
- Years active: 2005–present
- Label: Wichita Recordings
- Members: Katie Harkin (vocals, guitar, keys); Nestor Matthews (drums); Michael Matthews (bass)
- Past members: Doug Adams (bass); Nile Marr (guitar); Sam Pryor (bass)

Sky Larkin is an English indie rock band from Leeds, West Yorkshire, England, who formed in 2005.

== Early history ==
In common with many bands from Leeds, Sky Larkin released two singles on the Leeds-based label Dance To The Radio. Songs of theirs appeared on Dance To The Radio compilation albums 'Something I Learned Today' and 'Out Of The Woods And Trees', the former featuring 'Summit' and the latter featuring the Napoleon IIIrd remix of 'Keepsakes' In both 2006 and 2007 they appeared on the unsigned stage at the Leeds Festival. During this time they would play around the UK on bills with the likes of Los Campesinos!, Nosferatu D2, Johnny Foreigner, Wild Beasts and others.

In 2008 they released the 'Swit Swoo' EP digitally as a covers collection. Amongst those included was 'I Was A Teenage Hand Model' originally by Queens Of The Stone Age and the Bruce Springsteen song 'Because The Night' alongside the more eclectic choice of Jake Thackray's "Lah-di-dah"

The album was recorded in Seattle in spring 2008 with Sleater-Kinney and Death Cab For Cutie producer John Goodmanson.

The band signed to record label Wichita in 2008, and released their debut single on this new label, titled 'Fossil, I', on 20 October 2008. There was an accompanying video for the single which enjoyed success on MTV2 and can be viewed on Youtube.com.

Their debut album The Golden Spike was released in February 2009 on Wichita Records. A promotional tour of England, Europe and America (including an appearance at South By Southwest Festival in Texas) took place in spring/summer 2009, and in December 2009 they toured in support of The Cribs.

In 2010, the band recorded follow up to their debut and released Kaleide in August, which was preceded by the single, "Still Windmills". In September 2010, the band headed out on a UK tour. Later that year the band supported Blood Red Shoes, Les Savy Fav and Frightened Rabbit in support of second single "Tiny Heist".

Following the end of the album cycle, Harkin joined the Wild Beasts providing keyboards, drums and backing vocals on a worldwide tour. On 25 January 2012, five years to the day after the band released their first single, Doug Adams announced his amicable departure from the band. When Harkin returned from tour, Sky Larkin expanded into a four-piece, with These Monsters' Sam Pryor replacing Adams on bass, and Man Made's Nile Marr added as second guitarist. In May 2013, the band released a single, "Motto," and embarked on a tour supporting Dutch Uncles and Marnie Stern.

Their third album "Motto" was released 16 September 2013 and a video for "Newsworthy" followed. Following the release of "Motto", Nile Marr and Sam Pryor left the band and Michael Matthews joined on bass. The album cycle concluded with the release of a video for "Carve It Out" in November 2014. Harkin has since joined the reunited Sleater-Kinney as a touring guitarist, keyboardist and percussionist, including an appearance on the 15 January 2015 edition of the Late Show with David Letterman, the group's first live performance since their 2006 hiatus.

== Influences ==
Sky Larkin cited influences including This Et Al, the Futureheads, Death From Above 1979, Bloc Party, LCD Soundsystem, Liars, Interpol, Yeah Yeah Yeahs, Sleater-Kinney, Le Tigre, Gossip, TV on the Radio, Broken Social Scene, Arcade Fire, Blondie, the Ramones, At the Drive-In, the Mars Volta, Black Sabbath, Led Zeppelin, Queens of the Stone Age, Desert Sessions, Mark Lanegan, the Smashing Pumpkins, the Pixies, PJ Harvey, the Beach Boys, the Smiths, the Cure, Radiohead, ...And You Will Know Us by the Trail of Dead, Autolux, M83, the Postal Service, Massive Attack, Bjork, Cat Power, the Octopus Project, Johnny Cash, Miranda July, Peaches, the Eighties Matchbox B-Line Disaster, the Duke Spirit, the Bellrays, Deerhoof, Jaga Jazzist, Delta 5 and Pylon.

== Discography ==
=== Albums ===
- The Golden Spike (2009)
- Kaleide (2010)
- Motto (2013)

=== Singles ===
- "One of Two" 7", download and CD single (2007)
- "Molten" / "Keepsakes" 7" download and CD single (2007)
- "Swit Swoo" digital EP (2008)
- "Fossil, I" (2008)
- "Beeline" (2009), released as a watch
- "Antibodies" (2009) cassette tape single
- "Still Windmills" (2010)
- "Tiny Heist EP" (2010)
- "Motto" (2013)
- "Newsworthy" (2013)
