= The Sea Is a Good Place to Think of the Future =

Promotional single by Los Campesinos!

from the album Romance Is Boring
- Released: 2 September 2009
- Genre: Indie pop
- Length: 4:26
- Label: Wichita
- Songwriter: Gareth Paisey
- Producer: John Goodmanson

Los Campesinos! singles chronology
"My Year in Lists" (2008)	"The Sea Is a Good Place to Think of the Future" (2009)	"There Are Listed Buildings" (2009)

"The Sea Is a Good Place to Think of the Future" is a song by Welsh indie pop band Los Campesinos!, released on 2 September 2009 as a promotional single for their third studio album, Romance is Boring.

An accompanying music video was shot in Barry Island and directed by band bassist Ellen Waddell.

In 2020, it was ranked number 90 on the "100 Greatest Emo Songs of All Time" list by Vulture.

In November 2021, the band released a remastered version of the track, coinciding with the tenth anniversary of Romance is Boring.

== Reception ==
The song was named the week's "best new track" by music publication Pitchfork, with reviewer Ryan Dombal praising its "grand arrangements and transcendental gut-wrenching" lyricism.

Interpreting the lyrics to tell the story of a suicidal girl and her lover, Vulture writer Ian Cohen described the track as "five uninterrupted minutes of tidal post-rock" and a "future genre classic, even if no one really knew what to call it".

== Personnel ==
- Ellen Waddell – bass guitar
- Gareth Paisey – writing, vocals, glockenspiel
- Harriet Coleman – violin, keyboard
- Neil Turner – guitar
- Ollie Briggs – drums
- Tom Bromley – lead guitar
- Aleksandra Berditchevskaia – keyboard, vocals
- John Goodmanson – producer
