= Voices (Matchbook Romance album) =

Studio album by Matchbook Romance
- Released: February 14, 2006
- Recorded: April – June, October 2005
- Studios: Long View Farm (North Brookfield, MA)
- Genres: Emo; post-hardcore; hard rock
- Length: 61:45
- Label: Epitaph
- Producer: John Goodmanson

Matchbook Romance chronology
Stories and Alibis (2003)	Voices (2006)

Singles from Voices
- 1. "Monsters" Released: October 31, 2005; 2. "Surrender" Released: 2006

Professional ratings
Review scores
Source	Rating
AllMusic	4/5 stars
Rock Hard	8.5/10

Voices is the second studio album by American rock band Matchbook Romance. Production and recording for the album began in April 2005 after a year and a half of almost non stop touring. The album's sound leaves behind much of the stripped-down sound of their debut, Stories and Alibis, opting for a darker, more foreboding tone. The album was released through Epitaph Records on February 14, 2006. accompanied by the single "Monsters" and radio only single "Surrender".

== Background ==
Lead singer and guitarist Andrew Jordan adopted a much different vocal style for this record than their previous and debut album. Andrew described the album as one that embarked “on stories of betrayal, nightmares, ghosts, and of course a little love” and that it became natural for them to grow up from their previous pop-punk influenced sound.

The cover of the album was designed by Shawn Harris from pop-punk band The Matches Inside the album's packaging, there is a small plastic panel with alternating black and transparent strips. This panel can be aligned with parts of the album's artwork to reveal secret messages, hence the liner "There are voices in the walls". Some of the lyrics to the hidden track can also be found in the lyrics of the other songs, and are represented by the capital letters that are not colored in white.

== Release ==
The track "Monsters" was featured as the lead single from Voices and was released on October 31, 2005. The song ended up being featured in multiple video games such as Guitar Hero III: Legends of Rock, Madden NFL 07 and Arena Football: Road to Glory.

== Track listing ==
All songs written by Matchbook Romance, all lyrics written by Andrew Jordan.

1. "You Can Run, But We'll Find You" – 4:07
2. "Surrender" – 4:48
3. "My Mannequin Can Dance" – 3:56
4. "Goody, Like Two Shoes" – 7:10
5. "Monsters" – 4:04
6. "Say It Like You Mean It" – 4:22
7. "Portrait" – 4:26
8. "Singing Bridges (We All Fall)" – 5:12
9. "Fiction" – 3:26
10. "What A Sight" – 4:28
11. "I Wish You Were Here" – 15:46

- Ends at 3:47, untitled hidden track starts at 11:33.

== Personnel ==
Matchbook Romance

- Andrew Jordan – lead vocals, guitars, piano
- Ryan "Judas" DePaolo – guitars, vocals, programming
- Ryan Kienle – bass
- Aaron Stern – drums, percussion

Other musicians

- Phil Peterson – Cello & string arrangements on 'Surrender', 'Goody, Like Two Shoes', 'Say It Like You Mean It' and 'What A Sight'
- Victoria Parker – Violin on 'Goody, Like Two Shoes' and 'I Wish You Were Here'
- Trish Scearce – Pump organ on 'I Wish You Were Here'
- Mark Rank – Piano on 'You Can Run, But We'll Find You' and 'My Mannequin Can Dance'

Production

- John Goodmanson – Producer
- Greg Calbi – Mastering
- Mike Lapierre – Additional engineer
- Brain Thorn – Additional engineer
- Mark Renk – Vocal coaching
- Dana Childs – Project coordinator
- Benji Woerly – Drum technician
- Philip Pierce – Guitar technician

Artwork

- Emilee Seymour & Shawn Harris

Layout

- Nick Pritchard

== Charts ==
Chart (2006)	Peak position
US Billboard 200	43
US Top Independent Albums (Billboard)	2
