= Lovers le Strange =

Lovers Ie Strange

EP by Expatriate
- Released: September 2005
- Recorded: 2005
- Genre: Indie rock
- Length: 13 min 4 s
- Label: Dew Process
- Producer: Damien Press

Expatriate chronology
Lovers Ie Strange (2005)	Play a Part (2007)

"Lovers le Strange" is the debut EP from Sydney band Expatriate. The line-up was Ben King, Chris Kollias and Damien Press. Tim Rogers had already left the band by this stage.

== Artwork ==
The cover photo was taken by Matt O'Brien. The artwork is very closely modelled upon René Magritte's work The Lovers. It is speculated that the EP's title is an inside joke relating to the artwork, possibly suggesting that the piece The Lovers is strange.

== Track listings ==
1. "The Spaces Between"
2. "Get Out, Give In"
3. "Killer Kat"
4. "Aviation at Night"
5. "The Spaces Between" (Decoder Ring Remix)

== Charts ==
Chart (2005/06)	Peak position
Australia (ARIA)	69
