= Underground Railroad (band) =

French-English rock band

- Origin: Paris, France
- Genres: Alternative rock, experimental rock, post-punk, indie rock
- Years active: 2003–present
- Label: One Little Indian Records
- Members: Raphael Mura; Marion Andrau; J.B. Ganivet
- Website: MySpace.com

Underground Railroad are a French post-punk band based in London, England, originally from Paris. The band are on and signed to One Little Indian Records and have released three albums, Twisted Trees (2007), Sticks and Stones (2008) and White Night Stand (2011), as well as an EP, Pick the Ghost... in 2009. They toured promoting both their first two albums in the UK, and the rest of Europe, from 2007 to 2009.

They have been featured in the NME's "Radar" and Q magazine's "QPM show", and been played on the Zane Lowe show on BBC Radio 1. They also featured on the BBC Introducing Stage at 2008 Reading and Leeds Festival.

The band's members are Raphael Mura on drums and vocals, Marion Andrau on guitar and vocals, with JB Ganivet on bass guitar and backing vocals. Cello player Anna Scott played on their third album White Night Stand, and joins the band on occasional tour dates.

== Discography ==
=== Albums ===
Year	Album information	Chart positions	
Year	Album information	US	UK
2007	Twisted Trees: Debut album; Released: 7 June 2007; Label: One Little Indian		
2008	Sticks and Stones: Second album; Released: 29 September 2008; Label: One Little Indian		
2011	White Night Stand: Third album; Released: 13 June 2011; Label: One Little Indian		

=== Singles ===
Date	Single	Backed with	Record label	Format	Other details
2007	"Watch and Play"	"Headache"	One Little Indian	7" single	1000 copies
2008	"Sticks and Stones"	"Homeless town"	One Little Indian	7" single	1000 copies
2008	"25"	"N.Y.C (Money Money)"	One Little Indian	7" single	1000 copies
2008	"Kill Me Now (Or You Never Will)"	"Breakfast"	One Little Indian	7" single	1000 copies
2009	Pick the Ghost... (EP)	"Homeless Town" / "Monday Morning" / "Breakfast" / "Lots of Cars"	One Little Indian	CD EP	1000 copies
2011	"Russian Doll" (radio edit)	"Russian Doll" (full version) / "The Orchid's Curse"	One Little Indian		Digital
2011	"Ginkgo Biloba"	"Lucky Duck Idealise" (acoustic)	One Little Indian		Digital
2011	"8 Millimetres"	"Pick the Ghost" (acoustic)	One Little Indian		Digital
