= Sticking Fingers into Sockets =

EP by Los Campesinos!
- Released: 3 July 2007
- Recorded: Stir Studios, Cardiff; Warwick Hall, Cardiff
- Genre: Indie pop
- Length: 16:02
- Labels: Wichita, Arts & Crafts
- Producer: David Newfeld

Los Campesinos! chronology
| Hold On Now, Youngster (EP) (2006) | Sticking Fingers into Sockets (2007) | Hold on Now, Youngster... (2008) |

Professional ratings
Review scores
| Source | Rating |
|---|---|
| AllMusic | 4/5 stars |
| The A.V. Club | A |
| Pitchfork Media | 8.4/10 |
| Popmatters | 8/10 |
| Stylus | B+ |

Sticking Fingers into Sockets is a compilation EP released by Welsh indie pop band Los Campesinos! in 2007. It collects their two previously released 7-inch UK singles onto one CD. It was released through Arts & Crafts, being the band's first release with the label.

Track four, "Frontwards", is a cover of a song by Pavement, released on their 1992 EP Watery, Domestic.

The release was positively received by critics. Music publication Pitchfork, in a 8.4/10 review, called it a "superbly crafted indie pop" record.

== Track listing ==
All tracks written by Gareth Paisey and Tom Bromley, except for "Frontwards" by Stephen Malkmus and Scott Kannberg.

1. "We Throw Parties, You Throw Knives" – 2:18
2. "It Started With a Mixx" – 1:19
3. "Don't Tell Me to Do the Math(s)" – 3:20
4. "Frontwards" – 2:18
5. "You! Me! Dancing!" – 6:12
6. "Clunk-Rewind-Clunk-Play-Clunk" – 0:35

== Release history ==
| Date | Country | Label (Cat#) |
|---|---|---|
| 3 July 2007 | United States/Canada | Arts & Crafts (A&C025) |
| 27 August 2007 | United Kingdom | Wichita Recordings (WEBB147) |

== Personnel ==
- Aleksandra Berditchevskaia – vocals, keyboard
- Ellen Waddell – bass guitar
- Gareth Paisey – vocals, glockenspiel
- Harriet Coleman – violin, keyboard
- Neil Turner – guitar
- Ollie Briggs – drums
- Tom Bromley – lead guitar
- David Newfeld – producer
- Luke Jones – engineer (4, 6)
