= We Are Beautiful, We Are Doomed =

Studio album by Los Campesinos!
- Released: 27 October 2008
- Recorded: 12–23 June 2008
- Studio: Avast Recording Co., Seattle; Electrokitty, Seattle; Stars and Sons, Toronto
- Genre: Indie rock, indie pop, noise pop
- Length: 32:10
- Label: Wichita, Arts & Crafts
- Producer: John Goodmanson

Los Campesinos! chronology
Hold on Now, Youngster... (2008)	We Are Beautiful, We Are Doomed (2008)	Romance Is Boring (2010)

We Are Beautiful, We Are Doomed is the second studio album (Note: Due to contractual reasons, the band originally refused to call We Are Beautiful, We Are Doomed their second album, rather a mini-album or an EP. However, by 2017, frontman Gareth Paisey relented, calling it their second album because: "I want to be able to say that 'my band has released six albums' ... because it makes us seem like we've been more important for longer".) by Welsh indie pop band Los Campesinos!. It was released on 27 October 2008 via Wichita. Recorded over 11 days in June 2008 with John Goodmanson in Seattle, the record was released with no singles, just 33 weeks after their debut album, Hold on Now, Youngster... (from February 2008). The album's title was taken from a review of the band by Kieron Gillen, with lyrics from the first track being inspired from his comic Phonogram.

The album was met with universal acclaim due to its musical cohesiveness and exploration into noise pop. Its song "Miserabilia" was named the 94th best song of 2008 by Rolling Stone.

== Release ==
In February 2008, Los Campesinos! released their debut studio album, Hold on Now, Youngster..., which debuted at number 72 on the UK Albums Chart. In August 2008, they announced the release of their second album and its track listing. Frontman Gareth Paisey reassured listeners of the record's quality despite its unusually quick turnaround, posting to the band's blog: "This is no post-album cash-in...it's ten all-new tracks that none of you have ever heard before".

== Critical reception ==
Professional ratings
Aggregate scores
Source	Rating
Metacritic	82/100
Review scores
Source	Rating
AllMusic	4/5 stars
The A.V. Club	A
Drowned in Sound	7/10
Entertainment Weekly	A
MSN Music (Consumer Guide)	B+
NME	9/10
Pitchfork	8.3/10
Rolling Stone	4/5 stars
Spin	4/5 stars
Uncut	4/5 stars

Initial critical response was very positive. At Metacritic, which assigns a normalized rating out of 100 to reviews from mainstream critics, the album was met with universal acclaim, receiving an average score of 82, based on 22 reviews.

Almost all critics agreed the album was superior to their debut from early 2008, Hold on Now, Youngster.... Writing for NME, Louis Pattison concluded: "Cooked up in a session originally meant to spawn a batch of B-sides, We Are Beautiful, We Are Doomed instead debuts 10 songs that outstrip LC!'s debut album at every turn". For AllMusic, Tim Sendra claimed the record "has more depth and feeling". He said that earlier fans "may be initially put off by the emotion and desperation on display [but] they need to give the record a chance to take hold ... it grabs you by the throat and the heart, and doesn't let go".

== Track listing ==
All tracks written by Gareth Paisey and Tom Bromley, except "Heart Swells/Pacific Daylight Time" co-written by Neil Turner and Zac Pennington.

1. "Ways to Make It Through the Wall" – 4:12
2. "Miserabilia" – 3:15
3. "We Are Beautiful, We Are Doomed" – 3:54
4. "Between an Erupting Earth and an Exploding Sky" – 1:16
5. "You'll Need Those Fingers for Crossing" – 5:09
6. "It's Never That Easy Though, Is It? (Song for the Other Kurt)" – 2:21
7. "The End of the Asterisk" – 1:52
8. "Documented Minor Emotional Breakdown #1" – 4:27
9. "Heart Swells/Pacific Daylight Time" – 2:37
10. "All Your Kayfabe Friends" – 3:15

== Personnel ==
- Aleksandra Berditchevskaia – vocals, keyboard
- Ellen Waddell – bass guitar
- Gareth Paisey – vocals, glockenspiel
- Harriet Coleman – violin, keyboard
- Neil Turner – guitar
- Ollie Briggs – drums
- Tom Bromley – lead guitar
- John Goodmanson – production, recording, mixing
- Jim Anderson – engineering

== Charts ==
Chart (2008)	Peak position
US Top Heatseekers	43

== Release history ==
The CD version was released with an accompanying DVD featuring a short documentary of the band during their 2008 tour, as well as a 32-page booklet which, in addition to liner notes and lyrics, also includes drawings and poems from Jason Lytle of Grandaddy, Jamie Stewart of Xiu Xiu, Zac Pennington of Parenthetical Girls, Brent Knopf of Menomena and Ramona Falls, and Paul Heaton of The Housemartins and The Beautiful South, among others.

Date	Country	Label (Cat#)
27 October 2008	United Kingdom	Wichita Recordings (WEBB187)
25 November 2008	United States/Canada	Arts & Crafts (A&C037)
