= Matchbook Romance =

American rock band

- Matchbook Romance in 2006

Background information
- Also known as: Fizzlewink (1997–2001); The Getaway (2001–2002)
- Origin: Poughkeepsie, New York, U.S.
- Genres: Alternative rock; emo; pop-punk; post-hardcore
- Years active: 1997–2007; 2009; 2012; 2015–2016; 2025–present
- Label: Epitaph
- Spinoffs: Destroy Rebuild Until God Shows
- Members: Andrew Jordan; Ryan Kienle; Ryan "Judas" DePaolo; Aaron Stern
- Past members: PJ Manzo; Adam Bock; Jon Dunham; Chris Vicious

Matchbook Romance is an American alternative rock band from Poughkeepsie, New York, initially formed in 1997 under the name Fizzlewink (1997–2001) and then The Getaway (2001–2002). They were signed to Epitaph Records and released two full-length albums, one EP and one split EP with Motion City Soundtrack under their label. Their EP West For Wishing, released in April 2003, was their first professional record and was produced by Brett Gurewitz. In September 2003, they debuted their first full-length album, Stories and Alibis.

== History ==
=== Fizzlewink and The Getaway; Epitaph Records (1997–2002) ===
Matchbook Romance was formed by Andrew Jordan and Ryan Kienle in 1997 under the name Fizzlewink. The initial band line up consisted of Andrew as vocalist and rhythm guitarist, Ryan on bass and backing vocals, and Jon Dunham on drums. Two years later, PJ Manzo joined on lead guitar in the summer of 1999. This period of the band was heavily influenced by the sound of bands like NOFX, Bad Religion, and Pennywise. After three years of playing with Fizzlewink, Dunham decided to step down in April 2000. He was replaced by Adam Bock in July 2000, and soon after Bock joined, the band began recording an independent album called Who's Listening that was released on February 2, 2001. A few months after this release, Ryan "Judas" DePaolo was recruited as Fizzlewink's third guitarist, and with him, they started recording new songs. However, soon afterward, Bock was replaced by Aaron Stern (circa August 2001). This new line up prompted the band to change its name to "The Getaway", and with the new material and songs that they wrote over the prior months, the band soon began promoting itself on the internet, leading to posts on PunkNews.org about their music. When Epitaph Records president Brett Gurewitz caught on with one of these posts and decided to download "Ex Marks the Spot", one of the new songs that the band had written, he decided to contact Jordan to sign them. After being officially signed, they changed their name once again – this time to Matchbook Romance – in order to avoid a name conflict with The Getaway, a Canadian pop-punk band.

=== West for Wishing, Stories and Alibis, and early touring (2002–2005) ===
Matchbook Romance started writing their debut LP under the direction of Gurewitz. It is reported that Gurewitz initially contacted the band and asked them to not release what was supposed to be The Getaway's debut EP, titled ...If All Else Fails, which was scheduled to be released on May 24, 2002. In return, he offered them guidance to record a full-length album. Around this time, Manzo decided to leave the band due to creative differences and because he was not happy with the direction that the band was taking. He went on to join melodic hardcore and punk band River's End.

Matchbook Romance officially debuted with West For Wishing, an EP released on April 8, 2003, and later that year they released their first LP Stories and Alibis, on September 23, 2003. They also appeared on a 4-song split with Motion City Soundtrack in which acoustic versions of "Playing for Keeps" and "In Transit (For You)" were featured.

=== Voices and indefinite hiatus (2005–2007) ===
After three years of touring and the summer 2005 Warped Tour, Matchbook Romance returned in October 2005 to promote and tour for their second album, Voices, which marked a new change on their sound. The lead single "Monsters" appeared in the video games Madden NFL 07, Arena Football: Road to Glory, and Guitar Hero III: Legends of Rock. The song also received heavy rotation on radio stations and MTV, and was released on October 31, 2005. Voices was then released on February 14, 2006.

On March 12, 2007, after a 10-year career, they announced via MySpace that they were going on an indefinite hiatus; the actual reason of this was never stated but it is very likely that it was because both DePaolo and Stern decided to leave the band. A few months after the announcement, on May 31, Kienle posted an update stating that he and Jordan had been working on a new project with Amanda Rogers, although the project was "in its infancy" and being built "upon the foundation of Matchbook [Romance]". Nothing came out of this project. He also stated that he had joined Dead Rose Beauty, a Los Angeles-based band. During this hiatus, Stern joined Taking Back Sunday as a touring member for 2007's Projekt Revolution tour.

=== Occasional reunion shows (2009–2016) ===
In May 2009, the band came back to play on a small tour on the East Coast but after this tour, members of the band decided to work on separated projects. Drummer Aaron Stern went on to join God or Julie. Before the first hiatus, guitarist Ryan "Judas" DePaolo had started his own band called HILLValley and debuted their album Salutations in the summer of 2009, followed by a second LP called Upside Down in the summer of 2011. Vocalist Jordan formed the group DriftDivision and released a six song self-titled EP on October 26, 2010. In a video posted by his new band, he mentioned that he had been working on some songs with former bandmate Kienle. Around this time, Jordan also joined the supergroup D.R.U.G.S. (Destroy Rebuild Until God Shows) that was started by Craig Owens, formerly of Chiodos. Previously to this, Jordan had toured with You, Me, and Everyone We Know from 2008 through 2010. Their debut album was released on February 22, 2011, but the band split up in 2012 and later returned in 2020, although this time without Jordan.

The band briefly returned in 2012 to play two reunion shows in December of that year, and three years after, it was announced that they would be playing on the 2015 Vans Warped Tour. Ryan Seaman, from Falling in Reverse, supported them during some of these dates. The band went on to play a few shows in early 2016 to celebrate the 10 year anniversary of their second album.

=== Full reunion and third album (2025–present) ===
In December 2025, the band started posting on social media beginning with a photo of a microphone inside a studio vocal booth, followed by a clip titled "VISIONS" on January 4, 2026 which featured slowed down audio of a song. Upon speeding the audio up, the video was revealed to be a clip of a new song "Something Worse Than the Night". On January 12, 2026, the band officially revealed the song. It was released on January 16, their first release in 20 years.

== Musical style ==
Matchbook Romance was classified as a pop-punk band by The Washington Post and Syracuse.com. Kerrang! referred to them as emo, as well as a "Myspace band". AllMusic called them a melodic hardcore band.

They cited influences including Rites of Spring, Fugazi, the Get Up Kids, Quicksand, At the Drive-In, Bad Religion, NOFX and Pennywise.

== Band members ==
Current members

- Andrew Jordan – lead vocals, rhythm guitar, piano, keyboard (1997–2007, 2009, 2012, 2015–2016, 2025–present)
- Ryan "Judas" DePaolo – lead guitar, vocals, programming, synthesizer (2001–2007, 2009, 2012, 2015–2016, 2025–present)
- Ryan Kienle – bass guitar, backing vocals (1997–2007, 2009, 2012, 2015–2016, 2025–present)
- Aaron Stern – drums, percussion (2001–2007, 2009, 2012, 2015–2016, 2025–present)

Past members

- PJ Manzo – lead guitar (1999–2002)
- Adam Bock – drums (2000–2001)
- Jon Dunham – drums (1997–2000)
- Chris Vicious – touring guitar (2006)

== Discography ==
Studio albums

- Stories and Alibis (Epitaph Records, 2003)
- Voices (Epitaph Records, 2006) U.S. No. 43

Independent albums

- Who's Listening (Self-released under Fizzlewink's name, 2001)

Independent miscellaneous releases

- Carbonated Punk (Cassette self-released under Fizzlewink's name, circa 1998)
- The Getaway (Sampler CD self-released under The Getaway's name, 2001). Featuring two early demos of "She'll Never Understand" and "Farewell To Friends"
- ...If All Else Fails (Commercially unreleased The Getaway's EP, but was sent to different label companies, 2002)

Singles and EPs

- West For Wishing (Epitaph Records, 2003) - EP
- Promise (Epitaph Records, 2003) - Single
- My Eyes Burn (Epitaph Records, 2004) - Single
- Monsters (Epitaph Records, 2005) - Single
- Surrender (Epitaph Records, 2006) - Single
- Something Worse Than the Night (Epitaph Records, 2026) - Single

Compilations featured on

- Too Melodic To Stay Indifferent, Vol. 11 (SpUnK, 2001). Featuring "Kings" from "Who's Listening"
- Nada Recording Studio 2002 Sampler (Broken English Records, 2002). Featuring "If All Else Fails" from their scrapped EP "...If All Else Fails"
- Atticus: ...Dragging the Lake, Vol. 2 (Side One Dummy Records, 2003)
- Punk-O-Rama Vol. 8 (Epitaph Records, 2003)
- 2003 Warped Tour Compilation (Side One Dummy Records, 2003)
- A Santa Cause: It's a Punk Rock Christmas (Immortal Records, 2003)
- Punk-O-Rama Vol. 9 (Epitaph Records, 2004)
- 2004 Warped Tour Compilation (Side One Dummy Records, 2004)
- Matchbook Romance/Motion City Soundtrack Split EP (Epitaph Records, 2004)
- Punk-O-Rama Vol. 10 (Epitaph Records, 2005)
- Take Action! Tour Sampler Album (Sub City Records, 2005)
- 2006 Warped Tour Compilation (Side One Dummy Records, 2006)
- The Best of Taste of Chaos (Warcon Records, 2006)

== Music videos ==
- "Promise" (2004)
- "My Eyes Burn" (2005)
- "My Eyes Burn" (alternative unreleased MV posted in 2018)
- "Monsters" (2006)
