= John Goodmanson =

American recording engineer and indie rock record producer

- Born: 1968 (age 57–58); Alhambra, California
- Origin: Seattle, Washington
- Genres: Indie rock
- Occupations: Record producer, recording engineer
- Years active: 1995–present
- Website: www.johngoodmanson.com

John Goodmanson (born 1968) is an American recording engineer and indie rock record producer. He is best known for producing multiple albums by Bikini Kill, Blonde Redhead, Death Cab for Cutie, Los Campesinos!, and Sleater-Kinney, as well as the album Voices by Matchbook Romance.

== Selected discography ==
- Aiden: Conviction (Victory)
- Bikini Kill Reject All American (Kill Rock Stars)
- Bikini Kill The Singles (Kill Rock Stars)
- Blonde Redhead Misery Is a Butterfly (4AD)
- Blonde Redhead Fake Can Be Just as Good (Touch and Go)
- Blonde Redhead In an Expression of the Inexpressible (Touch and Go)
- Blondie: The Curse of Blondie (Left Bank)
- The Blood Brothers Crimes (V2 Records)
- Brandi Carlile: Brandi Carlile Prod., Engr., Mixing (Columbia Records)
- Ceremony Zoo (Matador Records)
- Cloud Nothings Life Without Sound (Carpark Records)
- Dance Movie Pierce (independent)
- Death Cab for Cutie: Drive Well, Sleep Carefully - DVD
- Death Cab for Cutie The John Byrd EP Mixing (Barsuk)
- Death Cab for Cutie "The Sound of Settling" radio mix (Barsuk)
- Death Cab for Cutie Transatlanticism (2 tracks) (Barsuk)
  - The Dirty Nil- "Master Volume"
- Ever We Fall Endura EP (Rise Records)
- Expatriate In the Midst of This
- Fight Like Apes Fight Like Apes and the Mystery of the Golden Medallion
- Foxx Bodies Vixen (Kill Rock Stars)
- Green Apple Quick Step "Feel My Way" & "The Unheard Music", on "Ludes and Cherry Bombs"; a single from Wonderful Virus (Medicine Label)
- Hanson Shout It Out (3CG Records)
- Hanson Underneath
- Harvey Danger - Where Have All the Merrymakers Gone? (London/Slash)
- Harvey Danger - King James Version (Sire/Warner)
- Hot Hot Heat "No, Not Now", "5 Times Out of 100" (Warner Bros.)
- Hot Hot Heat "Bandages" radio mix Sub Pop
- The Long Winters Putting the Days to Bed LP https://www.thelongwinters.com/
- Los Campesinos! We Are Beautiful, We Are Doomed
- Los Campesinos! Romance Is Boring
- Los Campesinos! Hello Sadness
- Los Campesinos! No Blues
- Los Campesinos! Sick Scenes
- Los Campesinos! Whole Damn Body
- Matchbook Romance - Voices - LP (Epitaph Records)
- Nada Surf Lucky (Barsuk)
- Nada Surf "What Is Your Secret" (Barsuk)
- Pavement "Stereo" Radio Mix (Matador)
- Pigeonhed The Full Sentence (Sub Pop)
- Poor Old Lu Sin (Alarma Records)
- The Posies Amazing Disgrace (Geffen)
- The Rockfords The Rockfords (Epic Records)
- The Rockfords Waiting...
- Rogue Wave "Bird on a Wire" (Sub Pop)
- Saliva Every Six Seconds (Island Def Jam)
- Satisfact Satisfact (K Records)
- Sepultura Nation (Roadrunner Records)
- Simple Plan "Crash and Burn" (Lava/Atlantic)
- Sirens Sister "Unspeakable Things" (The Control Group)
- Socratic Lunch for the Sky (Drive-Thru Records)
- Soundgarden "Spoonman" Remixes (A&M)
- Sleater-Kinney Call The Doctor (Chainsaw)
- Sleater-Kinney Dig Me Out (Kill Rock Stars)
- Sleater-Kinney All Hands on the Bad One (Kill Rock Stars)
- Sleater-Kinney One Beat (Kill Rock Stars)
- Sleater-Kinney No Cities to Love (Sub Pop)
- Sky Larkin The Golden Spike (Wichita Recordings)
- Team Dresch Personal Best (Chainsaw Records/Candy Ass Records)
- Team Dresch Captain My Captain (Chainsaw Records/Candy Ass Records)
- Three Fish Three Fish
- Train Christmas in Tahoe
- Treepeople Just Kidding
- Treepeople Actual Re-Enactment
- Underground Railroad Sticks and Stones (One Little Indian)
- Unwound The Future of What (Kill Rock Stars)
- Unwound Repetition (Kill Rock Stars)
- Wu-Tang Clan Iron Flag
- Zox Line in the Sand (SideOneDummy)
