= Los Campesinos! =

Welsh indie pop band

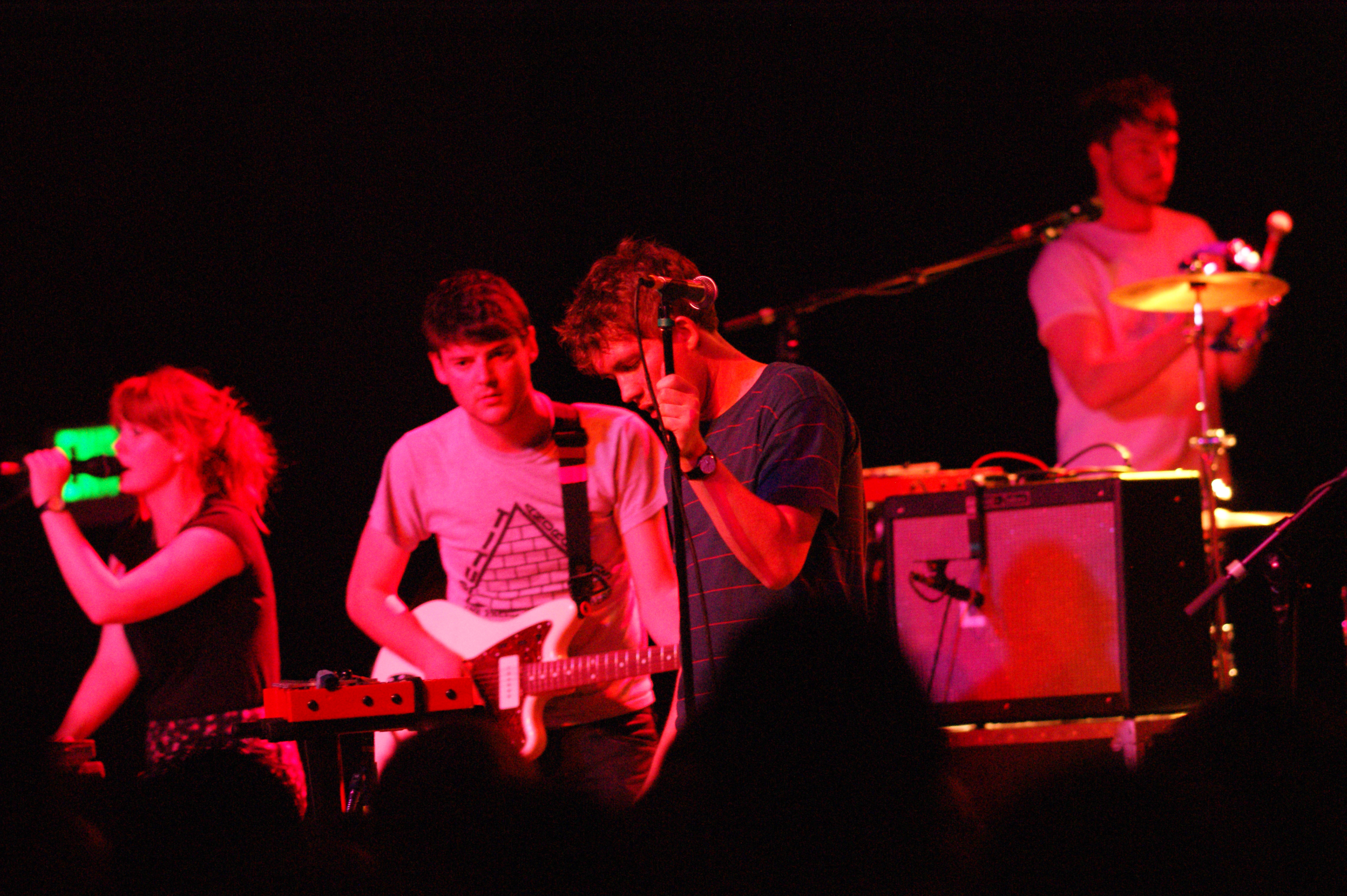
- The band performing in 2010. Left to right: Kim, Neil, Gareth and Rob (Tom, Ellen and Jason were present but not pictured)

Background information
- Origin: Cardiff, Wales
- Genres: Twee pop; indie rock; indie pop; noise pop; emo
- Works: Los Campesinos! discography
- Years active: 2006–present
- Labels: Wichita; Arts & Crafts; Heart Swells (independent)
- Members: Gareth David Paisey; Neil Turner; Tom Bromley; Kim Paisey; Rob Taylor; Jason Adelinia; Matt Fidler
- Past members: Ellen Waddell; Aleksandra Berditchevskaia; Ollie Briggs; Harriet Coleman
- Website: loscampesinos.com

Los Campesinos! are a seven-piece indie pop band from Cardiff, Wales, formed in early 2006 at Cardiff University. The band has seen several lineup changes – lead vocalist Gareth David Paisey and guitarists Neil Turner and Tom Bromley are the only remaining original members, now joined by guitarist Rob Taylor, keyboardist Kim Paisey, bassist Matt Fidler and drummer Jason Adelinia.

Influenced by the twee pop movement, the band released their debut studio album, Hold on Now, Youngster..., in February 2008, and followed up with We Are Beautiful, We Are Doomed, in October that year. Both receiving favourable reviews by critics, the former was described by Pitchfork as a "giddy, tuneful love note to individuality, pathos – and everything else indie pop built its name on". Their third album, Romance Is Boring (2010), saw the band expanding their "already sizeable instrumental palette". Since then, Los Campesinos! have issued four more studio albums, with All Hell (2024) being their most recent release and highest charting album, to date.

In 2021, Pitchfork included Los Campesinos! among the 200 most important artists from the site's first 25 years, and described the group as "the 21st century's most endearing cult band."

== History ==
=== Formation, signing, and debut singles (2006–2007) ===
The group was formed at Cardiff University in 2006, originally consisting of Neil Turner on guitar, Ellen Waddell on bass guitar, and Ollie Briggs on drums. In March 2006, Tom Bromley joined the band, assuming the role of lead guitarist, later followed by Gareth Paisey – who became the band's principal lyricist – on lead vocals and glockenspiel, Harriet Coleman on violin and keyboard, and Aleksandra Berditchevskaia on vocals, keyboards and melodica. The band's earliest compositions were influenced by post-rock, though no recordings from this era are known to circulate publicly. The word campesino in Spanish translates to "peasant" or "country person". All members of the band refer to their surnames as "Campesinos!".

The band performed their first gig on 8 May 2006 at a student union club night; they went on to play a number of increasingly well-received gigs around Cardiff. An early demo was recorded featuring the songs "Death To Los Campesinos!", "It Started With A Mixx", "Sweet Dreams, Sweet Cheeks", and "You! Me! Dancing!". The songs were posted on the band's Myspace account which saw their reach and reputation grow, and in August 2006 landed them a slot supporting Canadian supergroup Broken Social Scene. In November 2006, the band were signed by Wichita Recordings.

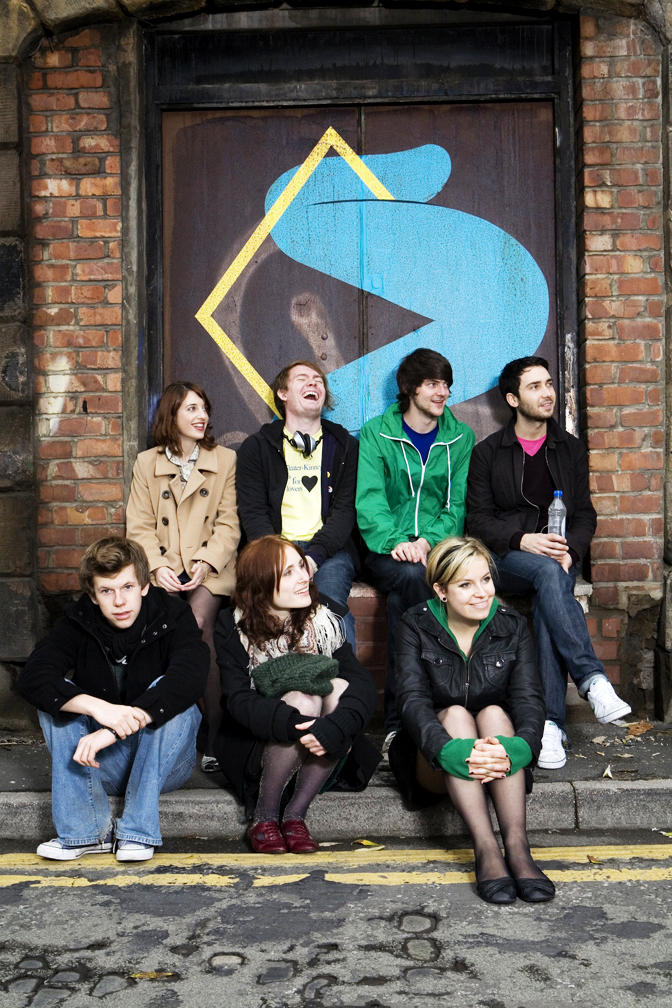
The band's original line-up in October 2007. Top row: Harriet, Gareth, Neil, Tom Bottom row: Ollie, Aleksandra, Ellen

The band's first single, a double A-side featuring songs "We Throw Parties, You Throw Knives" and "Don't Tell Me To Do The Math(s)", was released on 26 February 2007. In April, the band signed to Canadian label Arts & Crafts for North American releases. In June 2007, the band released "You! Me! Dancing!" on limited edition 7" coloured vinyl, which later went on to feature in an advertisement for Budweiser. This release was accompanied by a handful of live performances in Bath, Newport, Cardiff and London. Around this time they were seen playing with bands like Sky Larkin and Johnny Foreigner. Both singles, produced by Dave Newfeld, were released in North America on Sticking Fingers Into Sockets, a compilation album released in July 2007.

The band embarked on their first full UK tour in October 2007, following the release of "The International Tweexcore Underground" on 15 October.

=== Hold on Now, Youngster... and We Are Beautiful, We Are Doomed (2008) ===
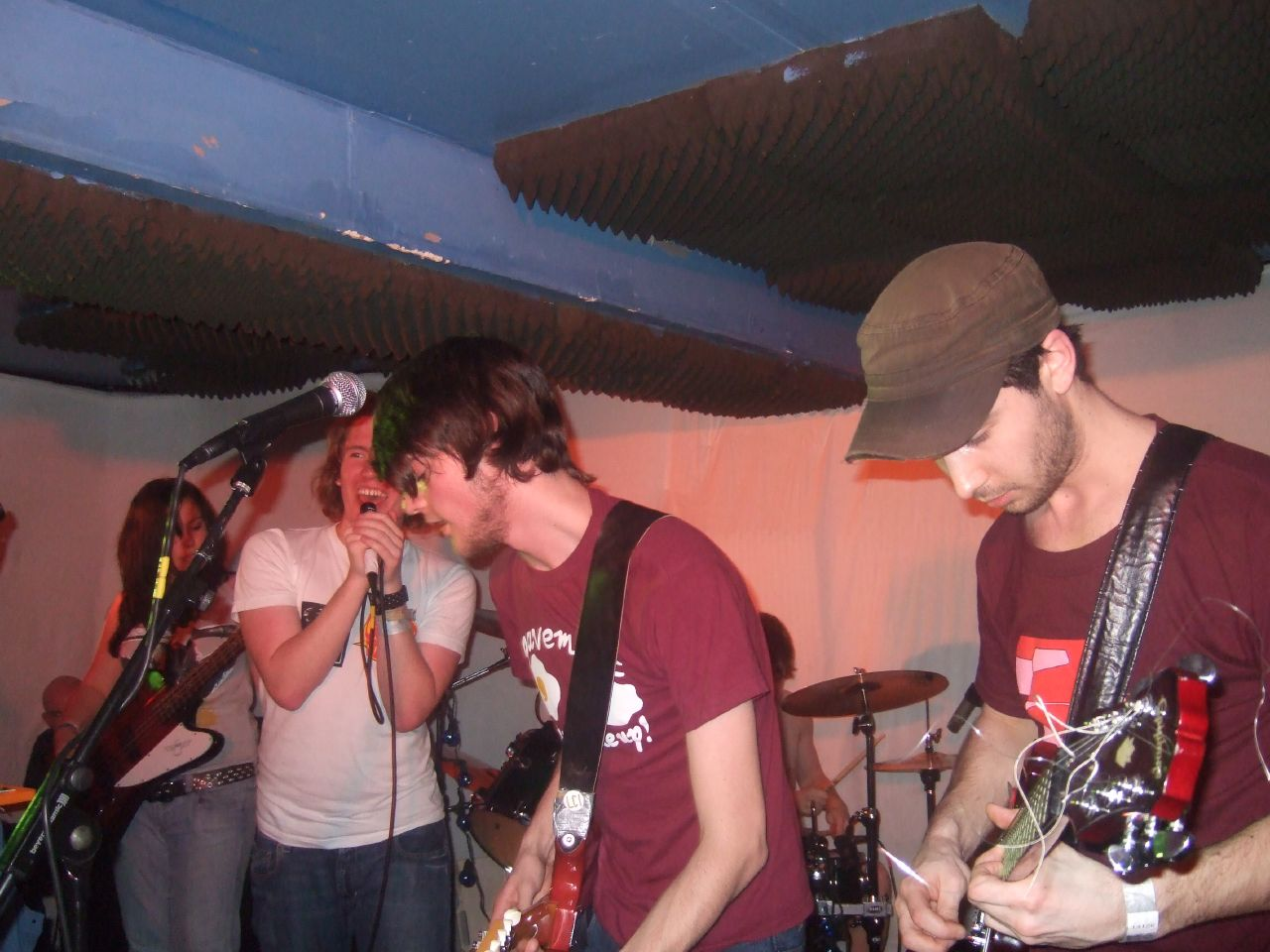
From left to right: Ellen, Gareth, Neil and Tom performing

Their debut album, Hold on Now, Youngster..., was released in the UK on 25 February 2008 and in North America on 1 April 2008. They embarked on a European and North American tour in support of the album. Receiving generally positive reviews, publication NME specifically praised its musicality but criticised its cohesiveness. Other sources such as Pitchfork and Drowned in Sound, however, lauded the album. The band made their TV debut on Tubridy Tonight in February 2008.

On 1 August 2008, the band announced that a record titled We Are Beautiful, We Are Doomed would be released before the end of the year, and the date later confirmed for this was 13 October, although that was later delayed to 27 October 2008. Paisey explained the album would not be a "post-album cash in", but "ten all-new tracks". No singles were released from the record, and its distribution was limited.

In October 2008, the band performed around the U.K. and in Ireland, headlining the Shred Yr Face tour with support from No Age and Times New Viking. In April 2009, the band played in Argentina, Colombia and Venezuela, their first performances in South America.

=== Romance Is Boring (2009–2010) ===
On 2 June 2009, it was announced via the band's blog that lead female vocalist Aleksandra planned to leave the band and return to her studies following a US tour in August. Rob Taylor, whom had opened frequently for the band in a solo capacity as Sparky Deathcap, became an official member, performing guitars, keyboards, percussion and glockenspiel.

The band's third studio album, Romance Is Boring, was released on 26 January 2010. It was preceded by the single "The Sea is a Good Place to Think of the Future", a free download released in September 2009, which was described by Vulture as a classic of the emo genre, "even if no one really knew what to call it" at the time. "There Are Listed Buildings" was released as the second single in November, coming with the announcement Gareth's sister, Kim Paisey, would join the band as keyboardist and vocalist.

The band made their American network television debut on Last Call with Carson Daly, in which they performed "Romance Is Boring", pre-recorded from their show at the El Rey Theatre in Los Angeles in May 2010.

In June, drummer Ollie Briggs announced that he had left the band.

All's Well That Ends, the band's second EP, was released on 19 July 2010 – the first to feature Rob Taylor, featuring alternative versions of four songs from Romance Is Boring. Jason Adelinia, who had been the band's road manager since 2007 and previously a member of The Ghost Frequency and The Pipettes' backing group, The Cassettes, joined Los Campesinos! not long after.

=== Heat Rash and Hello Sadness (2010–2012) ===
On 9 December 2010, the band announced the launch of a quarterly magazine, Heat Rash, and released a new Christmas song, "Kindle a Flame in Her Heart" as a free download through SoundCloud. Each Heat Rash release included a magazine, a limited edition 7" vinyl record, and downloads of new music. The first Heat Rash release included tracks "Light Leaves, Dark Sees" and "Four Seasons".

The band's fourth studio album, Hello Sadness, was released on 14 November 2011. Described by Gareth as having a more pop-oriented sound, it was preceded by "By Your Hand", released as a free download in September, and title track "Hello Sadness" in October. To promote the album the band played several tour dates across the UK, the US and Japan. In 2012, the band performed "By Your Hand" on the Late Show with David Letterman.

In an interview with the NME, frontman Gareth also confirmed that they would begin work on their fifth album in early 2013.

=== A Good Night for a Fistfight and No Blues (2013–2015) ===
On 7 December 2012, founding member Ellen Waddell announced she would be leaving the band to "try something new" following their show of 15 December at London's Islington Assembly Hall. Her final show also featured former member Aleksandra providing guest vocals during the encore. The show was recorded, and later released as the band's first live album, A Good Night for a Fistfight.

In August 2013, the band released a teaser trailer for their fifth album, No Blues. Lead single "What Death Leaves Behind" was released as a free download through SoundCloud. This was followed by a second single, "Avocado, Baby", released in October, accompanying a music video directed by Craig Roberts. No Blues was released on 29 October 2013.

The band released a six-song Christmas EP, A Los Campesinos! Christmas, on 8 December 2014.

=== Sick Scenes (2016–2022) ===
Matt Fidler was announced as the band's seventh member in June 2016.

On 24 February 2017, the band released their sixth studio album Sick Scenes. It was preceded by singles "I Broke Up in Amarante", "5 Flucloxacillin", and "The Fall of Home" and was accompanied by the announcement of the band's first North American tour in four years.

In 2018, the band announced that their first two albums would be remastered and reissued on vinyl on 12 October, with an additional EP featuring unreleased tracks. The band also announced that they would perform a concert in commemoration of both albums' tenth anniversary show on 13 October at the London Forum. Romance Is Boring also received a limited edition remaster and a zine documenting its creation was released. In February 2020, the band performed the album's full track listing at two sold-out shows at Islington Assembly Hall.

The 2021 animated film The Mitchells vs. the Machines incorporates two songs by the band, both from Hold on Now, Youngster....

On 7 May 2021, the band released Whole Damn Body, an EP of remastered tracks from the Hello Sadness era, via Bandcamp.

=== All Hell (2023–present) ===
In an interview with The Big Issue in December 2023, Rob Taylor said Los Campesinos! were working on their seventh studio album. At the band's show at the Troxy in February 2024, Gareth said the album was complete, set to release that summer. They also performed their first new original song since 2017, titled "A Psychic Wound". On 14 May 2024, the band announced in a newsletter that the seventh album, All Hell, would be released on 19 July, consisting of 15 tracks. They also released the album's first single, "Feast of Tongues", which was also their first new song in 7 years and 80 days. The second single from the album, "A Psychic Wound", was released to newsletter subscribers on 16 May, with a streaming release the following day. They also revealed a UK tour for later in the year. Prior to the start of their North American tour, the band released "0898 Heartache", a third single from the album, on June 11. This was followed on July 2 by the fourth and final single, "kms," which features Kim Paisey on lead vocals.

Upon its release, All Hell reached number 14 on the UK Albums Chart, which was the band's highest placement on the chart to date and their first album to reach the Top 40.

On 15 November 2024, the band released More Hell, an EP containing reworked versions of five tracks from All Hell, as well as a cover of the song "Wait" by the Secret Stars. The track list is the same as that of the deluxe version of the album, released as a limited edition digital copy on 22 July 2024.

Los Campesinos! performed two concerts at the Troxy in London on 14 and 15 February 2025. Following this, they performed five shows in the US for their "Holy Smoke" tour. The band released their second live concert album, with recordings from their Troxy gigs, So Close to Heaven, on 20 August 2025.

== Band sound and influences ==
When the band first emerged on the indie pop scene, they were pigeonholed with the 'twee pop' movement, as a result of their lively, joyous music. The band have worked hard since their 2008 debut, Hold On Now, Youngster, to shake this image. With their second recording, We Are Beautiful, We Are Doomed, critics generally applauded the band for adopting a new, darker guise. This continued through their following two albums, though whilst expanding the band's instrumental sounds. In an interview with Noisey in 2017, Gareth recalled that the band was labeled as a twee band early in their career, and they initially embraced the tag because they were happy to have people sharing their opinion on their music, saying, "We did invite the 'twee' label upon ourselves. I'm not sure if it's ever really accurate but it was a useful pigeonhole for us and, well, fair enough." Reflecting their movement away from their early sound, Gareth said, "Some people would use it to reference our most recent records and for me, then, that's just inaccurate. You may as well be calling us trance."

As a band, they have before claimed to be heavily influenced by Pavement, Modest Mouse, Guided By Voices, Blur, The Beautiful South, Xiu Xiu, Broken Social Scene, Built To Spill, Yo La Tengo, Sonic Youth, Pulp, Belle & Sebastian, The Magnetic Fields, Joy Division and The Smiths, amongst others. They also cite the literature of B. S. Johnson, obsessions with death, and football as their non-musical influences.

Gareth has cited Paul Heaton, the frontman of The Housemartins and The Beautiful South, as his biggest influence as a songwriter. He told Stereogum, "It's safe to say, if it were not for Paul Heaton, I would never have wanted to write lyrics."

Gareth's lyrics regularly feature references and allusions to football; Jeff Rueter of The Athletic wrote, "Few bands incorporate football parlance into their lyrics quite like Los Campesinos! — it's become a sort of Easter egg hunt for their fans written by [Gareth] David. 'Béla Guttmann of love. Curse all my exes to a life of celibacy,' he sings on 'Let It Spill.' 'Dreamt I'm anchoring that midfield, like the anchor in my midriff,' he offers on 'I Broke Up in Amarante.'" From 2020, Gareth was the vice-chairperson of Welton Rovers F.C., a Western Football League club based in Midsomer Norton. However, in October 2023 he revealed via a private X post that as of the 31st August 2023, he is no longer volunteering for the club.

== Members ==
Though the band formed in Wales, none of the members are Welsh. The members used to replace their surnames with "Campesinos!" as stage names, but discontinued the practice in 2024.

- Gareth David Paisey – vocals, glockenspiel (2006–present)
- Neil Turner – guitars (2006–present)
- Tom Bromley – guitars, keyboards, backing vocals, string arrangements (2006–present)
- Kim Paisey – keyboard, flute, vocals (2009–present)
- Rob Taylor – keyboards, additional guitars, percussion, backing vocals (2010–present; touring musician 2009–2010)
- Jason Adelinia – drums, percussion, programming (2010–present)
- Matt Fidler – bass, backing vocals (2016–present; touring musician 2014–2016)

=== Former members ===
- Aleksandra Berditchevskaia – keyboards, melodica, vocals (2006–2009; 2012 (one show))
- Ollie Briggs – drums (2006–2010)
- Harriet Coleman – violin, keyboards, string arrangements, backing vocals (2006–2011)
- Ellen Waddell – bass, backing vocals (2006–2012)

== Discography ==
- Hold on Now, Youngster... (2008)
- We Are Beautiful, We Are Doomed (2008)
- Romance Is Boring (2010)
- Hello Sadness (2011)
- No Blues (2013)
- Sick Scenes (2017)
- All Hell (2024)
