= Expatriate (band) =

Australian band

- Origin: Sydney, New South Wales, Australia
- Genres: Indie rock, experimental rock, new wave
- Years active: 2004–present
- Labels: Dew Process
- Members: Ben King; Cristo; Damian Press; David Molland

Expatriate is an Australian indie rock band from Sydney, Australia, formed in 2005. The band comprises vocalist Ben King, drummer Cristo, keyboardist Damian Press and bassist David Molland.

Expatriate has released two studio albums and two EPs to date, with the first album charting at No. 38 in the ARIA charts. The name is derived from what the band describe as "common themes running through each member's life".

== History ==
Frontman Ben King grew up an expatriate, moving between Australia and the Indonesian capital Jakarta, where he attended an international high school with classmates from all over the world. Students would trade cassette tapes, recipes and languages, all against the political background of President Suharto's controversial "New Order" administration. King returned to Australia with his family in his early teens, eventually studying politics at Sydney University before deciding to focus on music.

Drummer & percussionist Cristo was the son of Greek immigrants, listening on his father's transistor radio to Greek underground Rebetiko – a type of folk music originating from the forced immigration from Asia Minor of two million Greek refugees following the Turkish Independence War. Cristo and King met in Sydney's Annandale Hotel, where they discovered the similarity of their musical tastes and life experiences. Joined by Cristo's housemate Damian Press, a keyboard player and sound designer with a love for the atmospheric and ethereal in music, the musicians settled on the name Expatriate and began working on realising King's songs.

=== 2004-2005: Lovers le Strange ===
They recorded their debut five-track EP, entitled Lovers le Strange, at Ginsberg Studios in Petersham in 2004. Press worked as a producer and recording engineer, and was released in October 2005. The EP's singles "The Spaces Between" (2005) and "Killer Kat" (2006) gained solid airplay, the former spending six weeks on Australian national radio station Triple J's playlist. This led to national touring and a performance at the all-Australian Homebake festival in 2005 and in February 2006, their first headlining national tour was sold out. Appearances in London, Toronto, New York City, Los Angeles, and Austin, Texas brought them to the attention of Jim Kerr who personally invited the band to support Simple Minds on the Australian leg of their world tour that May.

=== 2006-2007: Play a Part & In the Midst of This ===
In July and August 2006, Expatriate headed to Robert Lang Studios in Seattle to record and co-produce their debut full-length album In the Midst of This with producer John Goodmanson (Death Cab for Cutie, Blonde Redhead, Wu Tang Clan, Hot Hot Heat). The band were interested in working with Goodmanson "in order to capture the rawness of their live shows" on record. Bassist Dave Molland joined the band in September 2006 after the album sessions were completed and they toured Los Angeles and London before returning to Australia for a seven-week national tour with Something for Kate.

Expatriate's Play a Part was released in February 2007, with In The Midst of This following in April. The album debuted at No. 38 in the Australian Recording Industry Association (ARIA) charts.

=== 2012: Hyper/Hearts ===
The band released their second studio album on 6 July 2012.

== In popular culture ==
- "The Spaces Between" was featured in the advertising campaign for Fox Sports (Australia), Domestic Cricket Competition in Australia and on the soundtrack for EA Sports Rugby 08
- "The Spaces Between" featured in the film Yes Man
- "Killer Kat" was featured on the soundtrack for EA Sports Cricket 07
- Expatriate appeared on the Paul McDermott-hosted ABC show The Sideshow on 23 June 2007
- Expatriate were featured on the June 2007 cover of Rolling Stone magazine as one of the top ten bands to watch for 2007
- Expatriate had a guest programming spot on ABC television show Rage on 10 November 2007

== Members ==
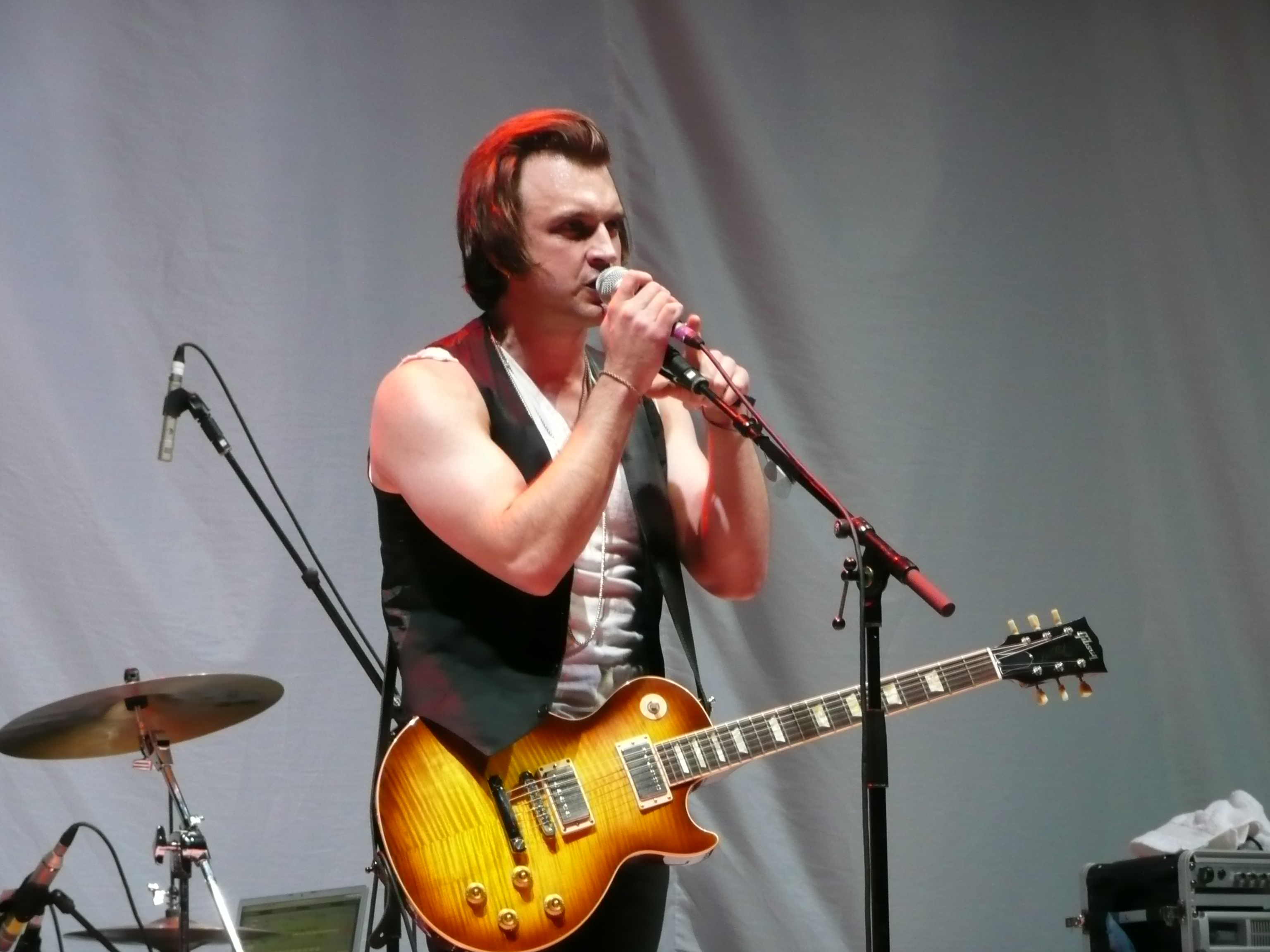
Ben King

- Ben King – vocals, guitar
- Cristo – drums
- Damian Press – keyboards, guitars, engineering
- David Molland – bass

== Discography ==
=== Studio albums ===
| Title | Details | Peak chart positions |
| Title | Details | AUS |
|---|---|---|
| In the Midst of This | Released: April 2007; Label: Dew Process (DEW905002); Format: CD | 38 |
| Hyper/Hearts | Released: July 2012; Label: Dew Process (DEW9000454); Format: CD, digital | |

=== Extended plays ===
| Title | Details | Peak chart positions |
| Title | Details | AUS |
|---|---|---|
| Lovers le Strange | Released: November 2005; Label: Dew Process (DEW90182); Format: CD | 69 |
| Play a Part | Released: February 2007; Label: Dew Process (DEW905003); Format: CD, digital | 54 |

== Awards and nominations ==
=== ARIA Music Awards ===
The ARIA Music Awards is an annual awards ceremony that recognises excellence, innovation, and achievement across all genres of Australian music. They commenced in 1987.

| Year | Nominee / work | Award | Result | Ref. |
|---|---|---|---|---|
| 2007 | In the Midst of This | Breakthrough Artist - Album | Nominated | |
