= Samantha Boshnack =

- Born: May 30, 1981 (age 44)
- Genres: Jazz
- Occupation: Composer
- Instrument: Trumpet
- Years active: 2000–present
- Website: samanthaboshnack.wordpress.com

Samantha Boshnack (Born May 30, 1981) is a Seattle-based trumpeter, composer, and bandleader of contemporary jazz music.

== Biography ==
Boshnack attended Bard College in New York, where she studied with Erica Lindsay, graduating in 2003. She subsequently moved to Seattle, Washington to play with the jazz ensemble Reptet, with whom she released four albums and toured. In 2011 she began two projects as bandleader: B'Shnorkestra and the Sam Boshnack Quintet. In 2014, she joined the composer collective Alchemy Sound Project, which includes Lindsay, pianist Sumi Tonooka, and others.

Boshnack's work has received support from many cultural institutions, including 4Culture, ASCAPlus, Artist Trust, Meet the Composer, Earshot Jazz, and Seattle Mayor's Office of Arts & Culture.

== Critical Response ==
In its write-up of Boshnack after awarding her the Make Jazz Fellowship in 2018, arts organization 18th Street Arts Center said, "Boshnack synthesizes a dazzling array of musical influences." Other critical responses have similarly emphasized her wide stylistic reach, calling her "difficult to define," a composer existing outside of "rigidly defined categories." Her large-concept works often showcase this explorational impulse. Global Concertos features five soloists from five continents, while Sam Boshnack's Seismic Belt charts the route of the ring of fire, Earshot Jazz noting: "Boshnack skillfully weaves melodies ... to express arcs, plate movements, and explosive volcanic activity."

Boshnack's "left of center modern jazz, with avant leanings" is also typified by her Nellie Bly Project, a 2017 concept record about the journalist Nellie Bly that features sung and spoken quotations from Bly's own writing. Avant Music News called the piece "an unusually compelling 35-minute suite that is strongly recommended."

== Grants/Awards/Fellowships ==
- 2012 Artist Trust Fellowship
- 2013 Artist Trust GAP Grant
- 2018 Make Jazz Fellowship from 18th Street Art Center

== Discography ==
=== With Reptet ===
- Reptet (Monktail Creative Conern), 2003
- Do This! (Monktail), 2006
- Chicken or Beef? (Monktail), 2008
- At the Cabin (ARC Music, ARC-2253), 2011

=== With B'shnorkestra ===
- Go to Orange (Present Sounds Recordings PS1301), 2013
- Global Concertos (self-released), 2016

=== With Sam Boshnack Quintet ===
- Sam Boshnack Quintet, Exploding Syndrome (Self Release), 2014
- Sam Boshnack Quintet, Nellie Bly Project s (ARC Music, ARC-2772), 2017

=== With Alchemy Sound Project ===
- Alchemy Sound Project, Further Explorations (ARC Music, ARC-2666), 2016.
- Alchemy Sound Project, Adventures in Time and Space (ARC Music, ARC-2857), 2018.
- Alchemy Sound Project, Afrika Love, 2021 (ARC Music, ARC-3574).

=== With Samantha Boshnack's Seismic Belt ===
- Live in Santa Monica (Orenda Records, 0059), 2019.
