= Sick Scenes =

2017 studio album by Los Campesinos!

Studio album by Los Campesinos!
- Released: 24 February 2017
- Genre: Indie rock
- Length: 40:19
- Label: Wichita Recordings
- Producer: John Goodmanson, Tom Bromley

Los Campesinos! chronology
No Blues (2013)	Sick Scenes (2017)	Whole Damn Body (2021)

Singles from Sick Scenes
- 1. "I Broke Up in Amarante" Released: 10 November 2016; 2. "5 Flucloxacillin" Released: 16 January 2017; 3. "The Fall of Home" Released: 14 February 2017; 4. "Renato Dall'Ara (2008)" Released: 28 April 2017

Sick Scenes is the sixth studio album by Welsh indie rock band Los Campesinos!. The album was released on 24 February 2017 by Wichita Recordings. The album was produced by John Goodmanson and the band's guitarist Tom Bromley at a studio in the Fridão parish of Amarante, Portugal. It is the band's first album to feature bassist Matt Fidler, who joined the group in 2014, and their final release on Wichita.

== Background ==
After releasing their fifth album No Blues in 2013, the members of Los Campesinos! all got full-time jobs and put the band on a hiatus of sorts. When they realized it was the ten-year anniversary of their formation in 2016, they began discussing the possibility of a sixth album. No Blues had fulfilled their contract with Turnstile, their previous label, and as a result they decided to self-finance their next record for the first time in their careers. Sick Scenes was recorded over four and a half weeks in Fridão, a small village outside of Amarante, Portugal. As a result of their commitment to day jobs, many members of the group could only record sporadically. Like most of their work, music and arrangements were left to guitarist Tom Bromley, with frontman Gareth Paisey contributing his lyrics only when it came time to record the album.

== Critical reception ==
Professional ratings
Aggregate scores
Source	Rating
Metacritic	74/100
Review scores
Source	Rating
AllMusic	3/5 stars
Exclaim!	9/10
Pitchfork	7.6/10
Record Collector	3/5 stars
The Skinny	4/5 stars
Uncut	2.5/5 stars
Under the Radar	3.5/5 stars

Sick Scenes received positive reviews from critics. At Metacritic, which assigns a normalized rating out of 100 to reviews from mainstream publications, it received an average score of 74, based on 16 reviews.

Emily Mackay from The Guardian felt the album "[balances] a warmer, mature sound with a still-angry energy." Ryan Dombal of Pitchfork Media was positive in his assumption of the album, describing it as "a love note to aging indie idealism and to those who've reveled in their careening pop-punk singalongs, scathing neuroses, and charmingly specific soccer references." Tim Sendra of Allmusic considered the album overproduced and lacking, but still retaining several elements of the sound of their earlier days: "It all makes for an unbalanced listening experience, one that only the most dedicated Los Campesinos! fans will likely want to undertake." The A.V. Club's Alex McLevy also found the album inconsistent, but enjoyable, commenting, "If Sick Scenes doesn’t necessarily cohere as a whole, the individual songs are strong enough that it also doesn’t really matter."

== Track listing ==
All tracks written by Gareth Paisey and composed by Tom Bromley.

1. "Renato Dall'Ara (2008)" – 2:48
2. "Sad Suppers" – 3:37
3. "I Broke Up in Amarante" – 3:14
4. "A Slow, Slow Death" – 4:01
5. "The Fall of Home" – 2:57
6. "5 Flucloxacillin" – 3:09
7. "Here's to the Fourth Time!" – 3:45
8. "For Whom the Belly Tolls" – 3:24
9. "Got Stendhal's" – 5:27
10. "A Litany/Heart Swells" – 3:27
11. "Hung Empty" – 4:30

== Personnel ==
Credits adapted from the album's liner notes.

Los Campesinos!

- Gareth Paisey – vocals
- Neil Turner – guitar
- Tom Bromley – guitar, brass arrangements
- Rob Taylor – vocals, guitar, keyboards, artwork
- Kim Paisey – vocals, keyboards
- Jason Adelinia – drums, percussion
- Matt Fidler – bass, vocals

Additional musicians

- Kelly Pratt – brass
- Aniela Marie Perry – cello
- Jherek Bischoff – violin

Production

- John Goodmanson – producer
- Tom Bromley – producer
- Jimmy Robertson – mixing
- Greg Calbi – mastering engineer

== Charts ==
Chart (2017)	Peak position
Scottish Albums (OCC)	67
UK Albums (OCC)	83
