= No Blues (Los Campesinos! album) =

Studio album by Los Campesinos!
- Released: 29 October 2013
- Recorded: 2013
- Studio: Bryn Derwen, Bethesda
- Genre: Indie rock; indie pop
- Length: 41:39
- Label: Wichita; Turnstile Music; Heart Swells
- Producer: John Goodmanson; Tom Bromley

Los Campesinos! chronology
| Hello Sadness (2011) | No Blues (2013) | A Los Campesinos! Christmas (2014) |

Singles from No Blues
- 1. "What Death Leaves Behind" Released: 29 August 2013; 2. "Avocado, Baby" Released: 8 October 2013

No Blues (Note: Stylised in all caps.) is the fifth studio album by Welsh indie rock band Los Campesinos!. It was released on 29 October 2013 via Wichita, Turnstile and Heart Swells. The album was produced by John Goodmanson and guitarist Tom Bromley, and is the first to not feature founding bassist Ellen Waddell, who amicably left the group in late 2012.

The first single, "What Death Leaves Behind", was released as a free download on the band's SoundCloud page on 29 August 2013. The second single, "Avocado, Baby", was released on 8 October 2013.

== Composition ==
Compared to the band's previous album, Hello Sadness (2011), No Blues is thematically a more hopeful and optimistic record and a "turning point" for Los Campesinos! according to frontman Gareth David. Speaking with Adam Smith from Interview, David said No Blues was lyrically about as morbid as its precursor, but "a little bit cockier, a little bit cheekier [and] a little bit more confident."

== Critical reception ==
Professional ratings
Aggregate scores
| Source | Rating |
|---|---|
| Metacritic | 79/100 |
Review scores
| Source | Rating |
| AllMusic | 2.5/5 stars |
| The A.V. Club | B+ |
| Consequence of Sound | B |
| Drowned in Sound | 8/10 |
| MusicOMH | 4.5/5 stars |
| The Line of Best Fit | 8.5/10 |
| Pitchfork | 8.0/10 |
| The Skinny | 4/5 stars |
| This is Fake DIY | 4/5 stars |

Critical response was positive. At Metacritic, which assigns a normalized rating out of 100 to reviews from mainstream critics, the album has received an average score of 79, based on 18 reviews.

Writing for Pitchfork, Ian Cohen said No Blues "ends up sounding like the happiest [Los Campesinos!] record, or at least the most implicitly hopeful". He claimed the band "have never sounded so muscular or crafted melodies as instantly memorable". Chris Tapley of The Line of Best Fit praised the album's production, in which the band "no longer assert themselves as the most important aspect of the tracks". He called "Selling Rope (Swan Dive to Estuary)" their best closing track and concluded: "No longer a band rough and ready jumping breathlessly between ideas, they are burying their chaos under smooth edges and verdant melodies and it sounds better than ever".

=== Accolades ===
Appearances on year-end lists
| Publication | Accolade | Rank | Ref. |
|---|---|---|---|
| The A.V. Club | 23 Best Albums of 2013 | 18 | |
| Drowned in Sound | Favourite Albums of 2013 | 14 | |
| MusicOMH | Top 100 Albums of 2013 | 72 | |
| PopMatters | 75 Best Albums of 2013 | 49 | |
| PopMatters | Best Indie Rock Albums of 2013 | 4 | |

== Track listing ==
All lyrics written by Gareth Paisey, all music composed by Tom Bromley.

1. "For Flotsam" – 3:43
2. "What Death Leaves Behind" – 3:37
3. "A Portrait of the Trequartista as a Young Man" – 3:01
4. "Cemetery Gaits" – 4:52
5. "Glue Me" – 5:04
6. "As Lucerne/The Low" – 4:22
7. "Avocado, Baby" – 4:36
8. "Let It Spill" – 3:20
9. "The Time Before the Last Time" – 2:47
10. "Selling Rope (Swan Dive to Estuary)" – 6:17

== Personnel ==
Credits adapted from liner notes.

- Los Campesinos! – arrangements and performing
  - Gareth David – writing
  - Tom Bromley – producer, brass and string arrangements
- Phillip Peterson – strings
- Michael Iles – trumpet
- Craig Walker – trombone
- Cardiff Cougar Allstars Cheerleaders – backing vocals ("Avocado, Baby")
- John Goodmanson – producer, mixing
- Mazen Murad – mastering
