= Hold on Now, Youngster... =

Studio album by Los Campesinos!
- Released: 22 February 2008
- Recorded: 2007
- Genre: Indie pop, noise pop
- Length: 42:52
- Label: Wichita, Arts & Crafts
- Producer: David Newfeld

Los Campesinos! chronology
Sticking Fingers into Sockets (2007)	Hold on Now, Youngster... (2008)	We Are Beautiful, We Are Doomed (2008)

Singles from Hold on Now, Youngster...
- 1. "You! Me! Dancing!" Released: 4 June 2007; 2. "Death to Los Campesinos!" Released: 18 February 2008; 3. "My Year in Lists" Released: 12 May 2008

Hold on Now, Youngster... is the debut studio album by Welsh indie pop band Los Campesinos!, released through Wichita on 22 February 2008. It debuted at number 72 on the UK Album Charts. The album was preceded by three singles – "Death to Los Campesinos!" (February), "My Year in Lists" (May), and most notably, "You! Me! Dancing!" released in June 2007.

A deluxe remastered tenth anniversary edition of the album with bonus tracks, specifically pre-album singles and rarities, was released on 12 October 2018.

== Release ==
The original album contains 12 tracks, despite only being 11 listed on physical versions. "2007: The Year Punk Broke (My Heart)" is an unlisted track on the CD release, and as a C-side on the double gatefold vinyl.

On 3 July 2007, "You! Me! Dancing!" was released as part of the Sticking Fingers Into Sockets EP. A rerecorded, slightly longer version of the track appears on Hold on Now, Youngster..., and was promoted as the album's lead single. The song appeared at number 72 on Rolling Stone's list of the 100 Best Songs of 2007. The track appeared on a Budweiser television advert in 2010.

Two more singles – "Death to Los Campesinos!" and "My Year in Lists", were released before the album became available on 22 February 2008. The latter was formerly part of the band's four-track My Year in Lists single.

== Reception ==
Professional ratings
Aggregate scores
Source	Rating
Metacritic	81/100
Review scores
Source	Rating
AllMusic	4.5/5 stars
The A.V. Club	A
Blender	4/5 stars
The Guardian	4/5 stars
MSN Music (Consumer Guide)	A
NME	6/10
The Observer	4/5 stars
Pitchfork	8.4/10
Spin	4/5 stars
Uncut	4/5 stars

Initial critical response was very positive. Metacritic gave the album an average score of 81 based on 29 mainstream critic reviews, asserting "universal acclaim".

Marc Hogan of Pitchfork called the debut "unusually taut and polished, with hooks, crescendos, and clever turns of phrase nearly always in the right place", citing "Sweet Dreams, Sweet Cheeks" as the album's highlight. Dave Simpson of the Guardian, in a four star review, wrote the album was "impeccably arranged and sharply constructed, and showered in xylophones and violins".

== Track listing ==
Hold On Now, Youngster...
No.	Title	Length
1.	"Death to Los Campesinos!"	2:52
2.	"Broken Heartbeats Sound Like Breakbeats"	3:35
3.	"Don't Tell Me to Do the Math(s)"	3:22
4.	"Drop It Doe Eyes"	2:44
5.	"My Year in Lists"	1:51
6.	"Knee Deep at ATP"	2:49
7.	"This Is How You Spell "HAHAHA, We Destroyed the Hopes and Dreams of a Generation of Faux-Romantics""	4:20
8.	"We Are All Accelerated Readers"	2:54
9.	"You! Me! Dancing!"	6:48
10.	"...And We Exhale and Roll Our Eyes in Unison"	2:50
11.	"Sweet Dreams, Sweet Cheeks"	4:31
12.	"2007: The Year Punk Broke (My Heart)" (unlisted bonus track)	4:44
Total length:		42:57

Japanese bonus tracks
No.	Title	Length
13.	"The International Tweexcore Underground"	3:16
14.	"C Is the Heavenly Option" (Heavenly cover)	3:17
15.	"Police Story" (Black Flag cover)	2:15
Total length:		50:45

Remastered Deluxe Edition
No.	Title	Length
13.	"The International Tweexcore Underground"	3:12
14.	"We Throw Parties, You Throw Knives"	2:21
15.	"Frontwards" (Pavement cover)	2:21
16.	"In Accordance To Natural Law" (Bikini Kill cover)	0:30
17.	"How I Taught Myself To Scream"	2:47
18.	"Yr Boyfriend" (Casiotone for the Painfully Alone cover)	0:42
19.	"It Started With A Mixx"	1:20
20.	"The Eyebright Bugler" (Deerhoof cover)	0:45
21.	"Police Story" (Black Flag cover)	1:58
22.	"C Is The Heavenly Option" (Heavenly cover)	3:15
23.	"Clunk-Rewind-Clunk-Play-Clunk"	0:36
Total length:		1:02:00

== Personnel ==
=== Musicians ===
Los Campesinos!

- Gareth Paisey – writing, vocals, glockenspiel
- Neil Beale – writing, guitar
- Tom Bromley – writing, keyboard, guitar, backing vocals
- Ellen Waddell – writing, bass, backing vocals
- Aleksandra Berditchevskaia – writing, backing vocals, keyboard
- Ollie Briggs – writing, drums
- Harriet Coleman – writing, violin, keyboards, string arrangements, backing vocals

=== Technical ===
- David Newfeld – recording (1, 2–9, 10–12, 14, 17, 19)
- John Goodmanson – mixing (1, 2, 4–8, 10–12, 17)
- Simon Francis – mastering
- Steve Davis – recording, mixing (18, 20, 22)
- Luke Jones – recording, mixing (15, 23)

== Release history ==
Date	Country	Label (Cat#)
25 February 2008	United Kingdom	Wichita Recordings (WEBB160)
1 April 2008	United States/Canada	Arts & Crafts (A&C031)

== Charts ==
Chart (2008)	Peak position
Belgian Albums (Ultratop Flanders)	97
UK Albums (OCC)	72
US Heatseekers Albums (Billboard)	45
