= MTN $5.2 billion fine =

Fine assessed by the Nigerian government to MTN in 2015

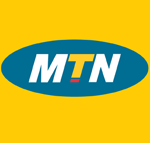
MTN logo

MTN Group, a major multi-national telecom company based in Johannesburg, South Africa, was handed down a $5.2 billion fine by the Federal Government of Nigeria through the Nigerian Communications Commission (NCC). The commission exercised section 20(1) of the Telephone Subscribers regulation (TSR) law on MTN, for not meeting the deadline set up by the mobile network operators (MNOs) for disconnecting the Subscribers Identification Modules (SIM) with improper registration. The compliance audit carried out by the NCC on MTN network revealed unregistered 5.2 million customers lines un-deactivated. This led to the NCC fining MTN with the sum of $1000 for each unregistered SIM, which amounted to $5.2bn.

What followed was major resignations among the top echelon of the organisation including the chief executive officer, Sifiso Dabengwa, the Head of Nigeria Operation, Micheal Ikpoki and the Head of Cooperate Affairs, Akinwale Goodluck being replaced with Phuthuma Nhleko, Ferdi Moolman and Amina Oyegbola as new chairman, managing director and Head of Corporate and Regulation respectively.

The new management employed a diplomatic measure between the government of the Republic of South Africa and its Nigerian counterpart to ameliorate the burden of the liabilities from the fine. This action brought about the reduction of the liability to $3.2 billion. Also, the new management partnered with Seamfix, an identity management company, to replace their existing solution and recapture their subscriber base. This implementation was done in 10 days, and over 70 million biometric data capturing was done.

The registration of SIM cards started in 2010, and the initial phase of this project was handled by the Mobile Network Operators (MNOs). However, NCC took over these operations because the service providers could not meet up with the six months earmarked by NCC. The registration by NCC started in March 2011 and it was anchored by seven consultants.

== Activities that led to the penalty ==
In 2010 the Nigerian government through the National Security Adviser, other securities agencies and the NCC initiated that all SIM-cards across all mobile networks in the country should be registered. The primary objective of this project is to reduce security challenges facing the country by criminals using mobile phones to perpetuate kidnapping, robbery and other criminal activities. This exercise is in line with Section 20(1) of Registration of Telephone Subscribers Regulations (TSR) 2011 which states that: "Any licensee who activates or fails to deactivate a subscription medium in violation of any provision of these Regulations is liable to a penalty of N200,000.00 for each unregistered but activated subscription medium."

In 2011, following the regulation the NCC directed all MNOs to deactivate newly registered lines that remain inactive for 48 hours after registration. In August 2015, NCC and securities agencies carried out a compliance audit on all of the MNOs networks. Contrary to the TSR, the audit revealed 5.2 million customer lines in MTN were improperly registered. Sahara Reporters claimed that the NCC and security agencies informed the public during a press conference held on 18 August 2015, that the expiration of the 7-day deactivation deadline ends on 11 August 2015. MTN failed to fully deactivate any subscribers and following repeated warnings and compliance enforcement visits by the responsible authorities only made a partial attempt to bar unregistered subscribers in selected areas over a few days in September 2015. Other operators had fully complied and reconciled their deactivations with the invalid registrations shared by the NCC up to 4 weeks earlier. The consequence of MTN's refusal to comply with the directive was even more pronounced as half of all the invalid registrations shared by the NCC belonged to MTN.

In a related development, the house of representatives committee on telecommunications, headed by Saheed Akinade Fijabi to investigate the abuse among the MNOs in complying with the registration of SIM cards in the country.

In a letter addressed to NCC on 2 November 2015, MTN admitted wrongdoing for their role of 5.2 million improperly registered SIMs after the NCC deadline on the network and also pleaded for mercy. NCC acknowledged the letter from MTN, but said the decision on the penalty is final, but the deadline for payment could be shifted to accommodate the position of each party.

== Post penalty activities ==
In October 2015, NCC made the pronouncement to penalise MTN for their inability to disconnect 5.2 million unregistered subscribers on its network. According to the TSR signed by all stakeholders in the telecommunications industry, any erring MNO shall be charged with N200,000 or $1000 per unregistered SIM on their network after the deadline for the registration. Subsequently, the commission demanded the sum of $5.2billion being the total amount payable by MTN for their role in improper SIM registration, to be paid on or before 16 November 2015. In a swift move to pacify its shareholders, MTN published a press release on the same day of the pronouncement that the deadline for the payment of the penalty fee of the $5.2bn (16 November 2015) will not be effected by the commission until the end of the negotiation. As part of the strategy to re-stabilize the organisation, Phuthuma Nhleko, was appointed in temporary capacity as the Chairman of the organisation over the next 6 months. This action follows the resignation of Sifiso Dabengwa, the CEO of the organisation. Dabengwa in a letter confessed to Guardian Newspaper that "Due to the most unfortunate prevailing circumstances occurring at MTN Nigeria, I, in the interest of the company and its shareholders, have tendered my resignation with immediate effect.". The office of the presidency in Nigeria took over the case of improper SIM registration. This instance warranted MTN group to organise a diplomatic meeting between president Jacob Zuma of South African and its Nigerian counterpart Muhammadu Buhari. The outcome of this meeting is the reduction of the fee from $5.2bn to $3.2bn. In a related development, many Nigerians are unhappy and took the case to a court of law for proper interpretation of the position taking by the government. A group of concerned Nigerian based in Abuja, said the action taking by the FGN is a slap on the fundamental human right and breach of our Nigeria constitutions. Timipa Okponipere, the lawyer to the applicant believe the action is not only a breached of Nigeria Constitution but an attempt by NCC to conspire with MTN to cheat Nigerians of our common wealth. He said, if the decision is not pursue to a logical end it would amount to mere academic exercise.

Following the report of the slash in the penalty fee, MTN Nigeria head to court challenging the 20% reduction on the ground that the amount will diminish their profit. According to the Mail & Guardian, John Burke, director of issuer regulation at the JSE said: "The JSE has halted all trading on MTN Group Limited. Trading will resume as soon as MTN Group Limited has issued a Sens announcement." Subsequently, 14% loss was declared on the market value of the company by Johannesburg Stock Exchange (JSE). In another fresh development, the Nigerian Governors Forum, an association of 36 governors from all the states in the federation. In a statement signed by the chairman declared their support to the NCC for penalising MTN for not disconnecting 5.2 million unregistered subscribers on their database, after the deadline given by the commission. The Chairman of the forum said "The forum also commended the NCC for its strict compliance and enforcement of the law with regards to the fine issued to MTN and advised the federal government to ensure prompt and full payment."

== The deadline for the penalty expires ==
The federal government of Nigeria after deliberations with the management team of MTN, gave 31 December 2015 as the last day for the payment of the penalty fee. According to the spokesperson of NCC, Tony Ojobo, the commission decision on this issue remains unchanged.

On 17 December 2015, MTN announced their decision to contest the decision by the FGN enforcing the payment of the penalty on the last day of the year 2015.

MTN Nigeria also got an order from the Federal high Court stopping the Federal Government from preventing MTN Nigeria from moving its funds in Nigerian Banks out of the country.

It was announced on 22 January 2016 that MTN would have until 18 March of the same year to reach an out of court settlement.

== MTN engages ex US attorney general ==
MTN has engaged the service of Mr. Eric Holder, a former US attorney general to intervene in the ongoing slam of $5.2bn fine on the telecommunications company, which was subsequently reduces to $3.2bn by the Nigerian government through NCC after much persuasion. He was hired by the MTN group because of his experience in corporate settlement. He served as US attorney general between the year 2009–2015. According to report by Financial Times Holder visited Abuja, the federal capital territory, Nigeria in January 2016 to meet with the official of NCC to challenge the fine.

== FG sets condition for out-of-court settlement ==
The FGN through the minister of communication, Mr. Adebayo Shittu on 26 January 2016, gave conditions to be met by MTN before FGN can agree to out-of-court settlement of the litigation made against the government by the communication firm. The case remains in court as at this date( February 2016). The minister requested that the case can be settled as per MTN request only if the communication firm withdraw the case from court and also if the president, Muhammadu Buhari approves a new deal for settlement. The minister said "As far as we are concerned, there can be no out-of-court settlement except the case is withdrawn from the court so that the government will not be put under pressure. If the case is out of court and if they make further moves, Mr. President may graciously make a decision. But now, I am not aware of any out-of-court settlement talks.". In another development, it was reported that the FGN is not ready to shift ground for the out-of-court settlement by MTN. The minister said "We are not aware of any out of court settlement on the issue. We will not accept out of court settlement until MTN willingly discontinue the case".

== MTN pays advance $250 million ==
On 24 February 2016, MTN announced the payment of $250 million as an advance-payment towards a reduced settlement, yet to be finalised, of the imposed penalty by the FGN. MTN group, through their spokesperson, said, "Pursuant to the ongoing engagement with the Nigerian authorities, MTN Nigeria has today (yesterday), made an agreed payment of N50 billion ($250 million) to the Federal Government of Nigeria on the basis that this will be applied towards a settlement, where one is eventually, and hopefully, arrived at. In an effort to achieve an amicable settlement, MTN has agreed to withdraw the matter from the Federal High Court in Lagos. Phuthuma Nhleko in his capacity as executive chairman of MTN Group and a director of MTN Nigeria is continuing to lead the team engaging the Nigerian authorities with a view to settling the matter." In the same development, the MTN Nigeria Chief Executive Office (CEO), Ferdi Moolman, said the firm has withdrawn the case in the federal high court in the intent to further deliberate on the settlement of the fine

== Nigeria president speaks on MTN fine ==
On 8 March 2016, President Mohammadu Buhari (PMB) hosted Jacob Zuma, the president of the South Africa Republic (RSA), on an official visit. During the visit, PMB noted that the negligence of MTN to follow the NCC mandate to de-register unapproved SIMs had aided the activities of terrorists in the country. He said "The concern of the Federal Government was basically on the security and not the fine imposed on MTN. “You know how the unregistered GSM (SIM cards) are being used by terrorists and between 2009 and today, at least 10,000 Nigerians were killed by Boko Haram, at least 10,000".

== MTN withdraws case suits against NCC and Nigeria ==
Chief Wole Olanipekun, the counsel to the telecommunication company, announced on Friday 18 March 2016 the withdrawal of suits instituted against NCC and the FGN contesting the fine slammed on it for its failure to disconnect unregistered SIMs from its network.

== MTN finalise payment plan with NCC ==
On 10 June 2016, MTN announced through its chief executive officer, Ferdi Moolman, that the sum of N300bn (less than $1 billion) had been accepted as the final settlement of the fine demanded by FG for not disconnecting unregistered lines from its network by the deadline giving by NCC to all MTOs in the country. The reduced fine must be paid within a period of three years. The telecommunication company also promised to list its stock on the Nigeria Stock Exchange. According to Premium Times, Ferdi said that "MTN will pay the NCC the sum of N330 billion in full and final settlement of the fine in line with an agreed payment plan,". In line with the agreement, the last tranche of the bill will be paid on 31 May 2019.

=== MTN paid first installment ===
The minister of communication in Nigeria, Adebayo Shittu, confirmed the payment of $254 million, the first tranche of the three-installments settlement plan. The fine of $5.2 billion was reduced to $1.7 billion. According to africanews, "For the first year, they paid N80 billion, after paying the initial N50 billion, and they will have to pay for three years until they will complete the N330 billion".

=== MTN pays additional 30 billion Naira ===
The telecommunication company recently paid additional 30 billion Naira to offset part of the initial fine of 330 billion Naira fined.
