= Spear REIT =

South African real estate investment trust

Spear REIT Limited
- Formerly: Arrow 2 Investments
- Type: Public
- Traded as: JSE: SEA
- ISIN: ZAE000228995
- Industry: Real estate
- Incorporated: 2015; 11 years ago
- Founded: 2011; 15 years ago
- Founder: Mike Flax; Abu Varachhia; Quintin Rossi
- Headquarters: Cape Town, South Africa
- Number of locations: 42 (2026)
- Area served: South Africa
- Key people: Abu Varachhia (Chairman); Quintin Rossi (CEO)
- Services: Property investment and development
- Revenue: ▲ R853 million (2026)
- Operating income: ▲ R913 million (2026)*
- Net income: ▲ R799 million (2026)
- Total assets: ▲ R7.58 billion (2026)
- Total equity: ▲ R5.39 billion (2026)
- Number of employees: 35 (2026)
- Subsidiaries: Spear Holdco; Webram Four; George Aerotropolis; Fundamental Holdings
- Website: spearprop.co.za
- Footnotes * Operating income is greater than revenue due to the addition of a fair-value gain on investment property

Spear REIT is a South African real estate investment trust (REIT), listed on the JSE.

Headquartered in Cape Town, the company was founded in 2011. As of 2026, Spear has 42 properties in its portfolio, worth a combined R7.17 billion, and covering a gross lettable area (GLA) of over 630,000m².

== History ==
The company was founded in 2011 as Arrow 2 Investments, by Mike Flax, Abu Varachhia, and Quintin Rossi.

Arrow 2 officially incorporated in 2015.

In 2016, the company changed its name to Spear REIT. In November that year, it listed as a real estate investment trust (REIT) on the AltX of South Africa's largest stock exchange, the JSE Limited. It was the first Western Cape region-specific property fund to list on the JSE.

In 2017, following its listing, Spear expanded rapidly, adding approximately R1.4 billion in property acquisitions, and nearly doubling its asset base and market capitalization.

In 2018, Spear transferred its listing from the JSE's AltX to the exchange's Main Board.

By 2021, Spear had begun repositioning its portfolio away from the hospitality industry, announcing plans to dispose of its hotel assets and instead focus on properties providing fixed income streams. As part of this shift, Spear sold the 15 on Orange hotel in Cape Town in 2023, for R246 million. The sale completed the company's exit from the hospitality sector.

Also in 2023, Spear launched GTX Park, a R400 million light industrial development in George, in the Western Cape. The development planned to comprise approximately 30,000m² of industrial space.

In 2024, Spear agreed to acquire a 13-property Western Cape portfolio from Emira Property Fund for R1.14 billion, substantially expanding its presence in the province.

In 2025, the company raised R749 million in new equity and subsequently expanded its portfolio through the acquisitions of Maynard Mall, Consani Industrial Park, and Berg River Business Park. The three properties had a combined value of approximately R1.07 billion.

In March 2026, Spear was included in the FTSE/JSE All Property Index and the FTSE/JSE SA REIT Index, both partner indices between the JSE Limited and FTSE Group.

== Operations ==
As of September 2026, Spear has a total of 42 properties in its portfolio, worth a combined R7.17 billion, and consisting of a combined gross lettable area (GLA) of over 630,000m². That same year, Spear's properties valued at over R200 million each were:

Property	Property type	Location	Gross leasable area (GLA)	Value February 2026	Ref.
Mega Park	Industrial	Bellville, Western Cape	86,066m²	R656 million	
Sable Square Shopping Centre	Retail	Cape Town, Western Cape	31,089m²	R528 million	
2 Long Street	Commercial	Cape Town, Western Cape	25,268m²	R497 million	
Consani Industrial Park	Industrial	Cape Town, Western Cape	82,942m²	R482 million	
Maynard Mall	Retail	Cape Town, Western Cape	25,097m²	R460 million	
Bravo Park	Industrial	Cape Town, Western Cape	40,331m²	R311 million	
1 Waterhouse Place	Commercial	Cape Town, Western Cape	11,963m²	R296 million	
Boundary Terraces	Commercial	Cape Town, Western Cape	8,705m²	R289 million	
Northgate Park	Commercial	Cape Town, Western Cape	16,880m²	R275 million	
The Island	Industrial	Cape Town, Western Cape	21,542m²	R238 million	
