= Selling a Vibe =

Studio album by the Cribs
- Released: 9 January 2026
- Studio: CRC (Brooklyn, New York); Eiger (Leeds, England); Tartan Hell (Portland, Oregon)
- Genre: Indie rock
- Length: 41:27
- Label: Sonic Blew; PIAS
- Producer: Patrick Wimberly; The Cribs

The Cribs chronology
Night Network (2020)	Selling a Vibe (2026)

Singles from Selling a Vibe
- 1. "Summer Seizures" Released: 18 August 2025; 2. "A Point Too Hard to Make" Released: 28 October 2025; 3. "Never the Same" Released: 5 January 2026

Selling a Vibe is the ninth studio album by English indie rock band the Cribs, released on 9 January 2026 through Sonic Blew and PIAS Recordings. It was their first album in five years, following 2020's Night Network. The band produced most of the album with Patrick Wimberly, with co-production from Miles Robinson. "You'll Tell Me Anything" was produced with Gordon Raphael. It was met with generally positive reviews and debuted on the UK Albums Chart at no. 5, representing their highest position to date.

== Background and recording ==
Their previous album, Night Network (2020), was the first on which the Cribs self-produced every track. Although it was widely acclaimed upon release, it became their first LP to chart under the top 10 on the UK Albums Chart since 2007's Men's Needs, Women's Needs, Whatever at no. 19. In search of a producer for their next album, they originally recorded five tracks in Leeds with Gordon Raphael, known for producing the Strokes' first two albums. Ultimately, they chose producer Patrick Wimberly, who had worked with artists such as Caroline Polachek, Ellie Goulding, and Paloma Faith. Ryan Jarman told the NME that they opted for Wimberly because they wanted a producer who was more on the pop-oriented end of the musical spectrum, so that the band would be forced to operate outside of their normal comfort zone, having previously worked with rock producers.

== Promotion and singles ==
On 18 August 2025, the Cribs announced Selling a Vibe and released its lead single "Summer Seizures", the first song they recorded for the album. Accompanied with the single was a music video that shows the band performing live, directed by Andy Knowles and shot on 16 mm film. The subsequent month, the band began a North American tour.

A second single, "A Point Too Hard to Make", was released on 28 October 2025. As part of their 2026 UK tour, the band are scheduled to perform at Millennium Square in Leeds for the first time in ten years. On 5 January 2026, four days before the album's release, the Cribs released the third and final single "Never the Same", which was written following a performance at Louis Tomlinson's Away from Home festival. It was initially intended for Tomlinson's next album before the band decided to keep the song for themselves.

== Release ==
On 9 January 2026, Selling a Vibe was released through Sonic Blew and PIAS Recordings. Following Night Network from 2020, it was their first album in more than five years. A week later, it entered the UK Album Charts at no. 5, the Cribs' highest entry to date.

=== Gordon Raphael Sessions EP ===
On 15 January, to help promote the album in the charts, the band also released the Gordon Raphael Sessions EP as part of a digital deluxe version of Selling a Vibe. It contains early versions of five albums tracks that they had recorded with the producer. A 10-inch vinyl release of the EP is scheduled for 18 April 2026 on Record Store Day.

== Critical reception ==
Professional ratings
Aggregate scores
Source	Rating
AnyDecentMusic?	7.7/10
Metacritic	78/100
Review scores
Source	Rating
Clash	8/10
Classic Pop	2/5 stars
DIY	4.5/5 stars
The Guardian	4/5 stars
The Irish Times	4/5 stars
Louder Than War	4/5 stars
NME	4/5 stars
Record Collector	3/5 stars
The Times	3/5 stars
Uncut	7/10

According to the review aggregator Metacritic, Selling a Vibe received "generally favorable reviews" based on a weighted average score of 78 out of 100 from 11 critic scores. Another aggregator, AnyDecentMusic?, gave the album 7.7 out of 10 based on a sample of 16 critical reviews.

In a four-and-a-half-star review for the magazine DIY, Joe Goggins said that by the time it closes with "Brothers Won't Break", the album is "a roar of assurance ... that they remain one of the most irrepressibly vital bands in Britain"; Goggins additionally praised the band's decision to enlist Wimberly as producer, feeling that they benefited from his presence. Alexis Petridis of The Guardian made it his "Album of the Week" and rated it four stars, saying that although it felt "a little more streamlined" in comparison to Night Network, "the melodies soar, the choruses hit, everything clicks faultlessly". In Record Collector, Annie Zaleski thought that with Selling a Vibe, the Cribs retain the consistency of their previous material but added that it "is often cohesive to the point of being monotonous", ultimately rating the album three stars out of five.

== Track listing ==
All tracks are written by the Cribs.

Selling a Vibe track listing
No.	Title	Length
1.	"Dark Luck"	2:57
2.	"Selling a Vibe"	3:17
3.	"A Point Too Hard to Make"	3:28
4.	"Never the Same"	2:50
5.	"Summer Seizures"	3:55
6.	"Looking for the Wrong Guy"	4:28
7.	"If Our Paths Never Crossed"	3:33
8.	"Self Respect"	3:57
9.	"You'll Tell Me Anything"	3:03
10.	"Rose Mist"	3:23
11.	"Distractions"	3:35
12.	"Brothers Won't Break"	3:01
Total length:		41:27

Gordon Raphael Sessions EP
No.	Title	Length
1.	"Dark Luck" (Gordon Raphael version)	3:18
2.	"Selling a Vibe" (Gordon Raphael version)	3:18
3.	"A Point Too Hard to Make" (Gordon Raphael version)	3:27
4.	"You'll Tell Me Anything" (Gordon Raphael version)	3:04
5.	"Summer Seizures" (Gordon Raphael version)	3:58
Total length:		17:05

== Personnel ==
Credits are adapted from the vinyl liner notes.

=== The Cribs ===
- Gary Jarman – vocals, production, additional engineering and recording; bass (except track 6), keyboards (3, 7, 8, 10), additional guitar (5, 9, 11, 12)
- Ross Jarman – drums, production
- Ryan Jarman – guitar, vocals, production, additional engineering and recording; organ (6, 12)

=== Additional contributors ===
- Patrick Wimberly – synthesiser (5, 6, 8, 10), production (except 9)
- Jennifer Turner – bass (6)
- Francisco Morales – operatic tenor (9)
- Miles Robinson – co-production (except 9), engineering
- Gordon Raphael – production (9)
- Sam Darwish – engineering assistance at the CRC, Brooklyn, New York
- Dom Richmond – engineering assistance at Eiger Studios, Leeds, England
- Lars Stalfors – mixing at Lankershim Studios, Los Angeles
- Hamish Patrick – mixing assistance
- Greg Calbi – mastering at Sterling Sound, Edgewater, New Jersey
- Steve Gullick – band portraits
- Liz Hirsch – art and design

== Charts ==
Chart performance for Selling a Vibe
Chart (2026)	Peak position
Scottish Albums (OCC)	2
UK Albums (OCC)	5
UK Independent Albums (OCC)	2
