= FTSE/JSE Top 40 Index =

Index consisting of the 40 major companies trading on the JSE

- Foundation: June 24, 2002; 24 years ago
- Exchanges: JSE Limited
- Trading symbol: JTOPI
- Constituents: 40
- Weighting method: Capitalization-weighted
- Related indices: FTSE/JSE All-Share Index

The FTSE/JSE Top 40 Index is a South African stock market index. The index consists of the 40 largest stocks in the FTSE/JSE All-Share Index of the JSE Limited by market capitalization.

The FTSE/JSE All-Share Index is South Africa's most important index, comprising all companies listed on the JSE. They cover 99 percent of the exchange's market capitalization and trading volume.

The Top 40 Index was published on 24 June 2002, with a base value of 10,300.31 points.

== Components ==
The index components, in alphabetical order, as at 18 June 2025:

Name	Sector	Logo
Absa Group	Finance	
Anglo American	Mining	
Anglogold Ashanti	Mining	
AB InBev	Beverages	
Aspen Pharmacare	Pharmaceuticals	
BHP	Mining	
Bidcorp	Food	
Bidvest Group	Holding	
BAT	Tobacco	
Capitec	Banking	
Clicks	Pharmaceutivals	
Discovery	Finance	
Exxaro	Mining	
FirstRand	Banking	
Glencore	Mining	
Gold Fields	Mining	
Growthpoint Properties	Real estate	
Implats	Mining	
Investec Ltd	Banking	
Investec PLC	Banking	
Mondi	Paper	
Mr Price Group	Retail	
MTN Group	Telecommunications	
MultiChoice	Media	
Naspers	Media	
Nedbank	Banking	
NEPI Rockcastle	Real estate	
Northam Platinum	Mining	
Old Mutual	Insurance	
Prosus	Investments	
Reinet Investments	Investments	
Remgro	Investments	
RMH	Finance	
Sanlam	Insurance	
Sasol	Chemicals	
Shoprite	Retail	
Standard Bank	Banking	
Valterra Platinum	Mining	
Vodacom	Telecommunications	
Woolworths Holdings	Retail	

== Annual returns ==
The following table shows the annual development of the FTSE/JSE Top 40 Index since 1996.

Year	Closing level	Change in index (in points)	Change in index (in %)
1996	5,800.07	361.34	6.64
1997	5,072.13	−727.94	−12.55
1998	4,562.63	−509.50	−10.05
1999	7,981.01	3,418.38	74.92
2000	8,038.84	57.83	0.72
2001	10,074.38	2,035.54	25.32
2002	8,682.03	−1392.35	−13.82
2003	9,495.76	813.73	9.37
2004	11,405.72	1,909.96	20.11
2005	16,438.05	5,032.33	44.12
2006	22,607.16	6,169.11	37.53
2007	26,250.29	3,643.13	16.11
2008	19,444.40	−6,805.89	−25.93
2009	24,996.97	5,552.57	28.56
2010	28,639.40	3,642.43	14.57
2011	28,469.81	−169.59	−0.59
2012	34,795.50	6,325.69	22.22
2013	41,482.39	6,686.89	19.22
2014	43,969.96	2,487.57	6.00
2015	45,797.30	1,827.34	4.16
2016	43,901.99	−1,895.31	−4.14
2017	52,533.04	8,631.05	19.66
2018	46,726.59	−5,806.45	−12.83
2019	50,816.05	4,089.46	8.75
2020	54,379.58	3,563.53	7.01
2021	67,052.40	12,672.82	23.30
2022	66,955.50	−96.90	−0.14
2023	70,494.80	3,593.30	5.29
2024	75,381.31	4,886.51	6.93
2025	107,977.90	32,596.59	43.24
