= Nhleko =

Nhleko is a surname. Notable people with this surname include:

- Nathi Nhleko (born 1964), South African politician
- Phuthuma Nhleko (born 1960), South African businessman
- Toni Nhleko (born 1979), retired South African soccer player
- Wonder Nhleko (born 1981), Liswati former footballer
