= IMatchative =

iMatchative is the parent company of the financial technology product, AltX. The company was founded in 2012 by Sam Hocking. Company is no longer trading as of 2023.
