= South African Futures Exchange =

Financial market

- Type: Subsidiary
- Founded: 1990; 36 years ago
- Parent: JSE Limited (from 2001)
- Website: safex.co.za

The South African Futures Exchange (Safex) is the futures exchange subsidiary of JSE Limited, the Johannesburg-based exchange. It consists of two divisions; a financial markets division for trading of equity derivatives and an agricultural markets division (AMD) for trading of agricultural derivatives.

Safex was formed in 1990 as an independent exchange and experienced steady growth over the following decade. In 1995 a separate agricultural markets division was formed for trading of agricultural derivatives. The exchange continued to make steady progress despite intensifying competition from international derivative exchanges and over-the-counter alternatives. By 1997 Safex reserves have grown sufficiently to allow a significant reduction in the fees it levies per future or options contract. Consequently, all fees were reduced by 50 per cent that year and in the charges on allocated trades were removed. In 2001 the exchange was acquired by the JSE Securities Exchange, with the JSE agreeing to keep the Safex branding.

The exchange is a Self Regulatory Authority and exercises its regulatory functions in terms of the Financial Markets Control Act, 1989 and its rules. The Exchange, in turn, is supervised by FSB. -Tisetso

== Historical development ==
Date	Event
May 2001	Safex and JSE members agree to buyout of Safex by JSE Securities Exchange. Effective date of transaction to be 1 July 2001. The JSE agrees to retain the Safex branding and creates two divisions - Safex Financial Derivatives and Safex Agricultural Derivatives.
August 2000	Individual Equities contract listed has increased to 49.
July 2000	New Government Bond Index launched (GOVI).
February 1999	The Individual Equity Options are replaced with twelve Individual Equity Futures and Options on the futures. Twelve IEF's listed.
March 1998	Options introduced on agricultural products.
September 1997	Individual equity options introduced on the six largest equity counters.
January 1997	Open interest exceeds 1 million contracts.
May 1996	Introduction of fully automated trading through a specifically designed system that was written in South Africa.
January 1995	Safex Agricultural Derivatives Division opened.
December 1993	Volumes exceed 1 million per month for the first time. Open interest is over 500,000 contracts.
January 1993	Monthly volumes exceed 200,000. Open interest exceeds 100,000 contracts.
October 1992	Options-on-futures launched together with a world- class, portfolio-scanning- type margining system.
June 1992	Monthly volumes start consistently exceeding 100,000 contracts.
October 1991	Permission received from the South African Reserve Bank for non-residents to participate on Safex via the Financial Rand system.
August 1990	Enabling legislation (the Financial Markets Control Act, 1990) is enacted and Safex is officially licensed as a derivatives exchange. Officially opened on 10 August 1990 by the Minister of Finance. Monthly volumes are approximately 60,000 contracts, with 10,000 open interest.
April 1990	Safcom takes over operation of the informal futures market from RMB. Futures contracts are available on equity indices, long bonds and money market products.
September 1988	Twenty-one banks and financial institutions meet and establish the South African Futures Exchange (Safex) and the Safex Clearing Company (Safcom).
April 1987	Rand Merchant Bank Limited (RMB) start 5 trading "futures" contracts on various equity indices and long bonds. RMB is the exchange, clearing house and only market maker.

== See also ==
- Alternative Exchange
- Bond Exchange of South Africa
- Johannesburg Stock Exchange
- List of futures exchanges
- List of stock exchanges
- List of African stock exchanges
- South African Institute of Financial Markets
