= Mr Price Group =

South African retail company

Mr Price Group Limited

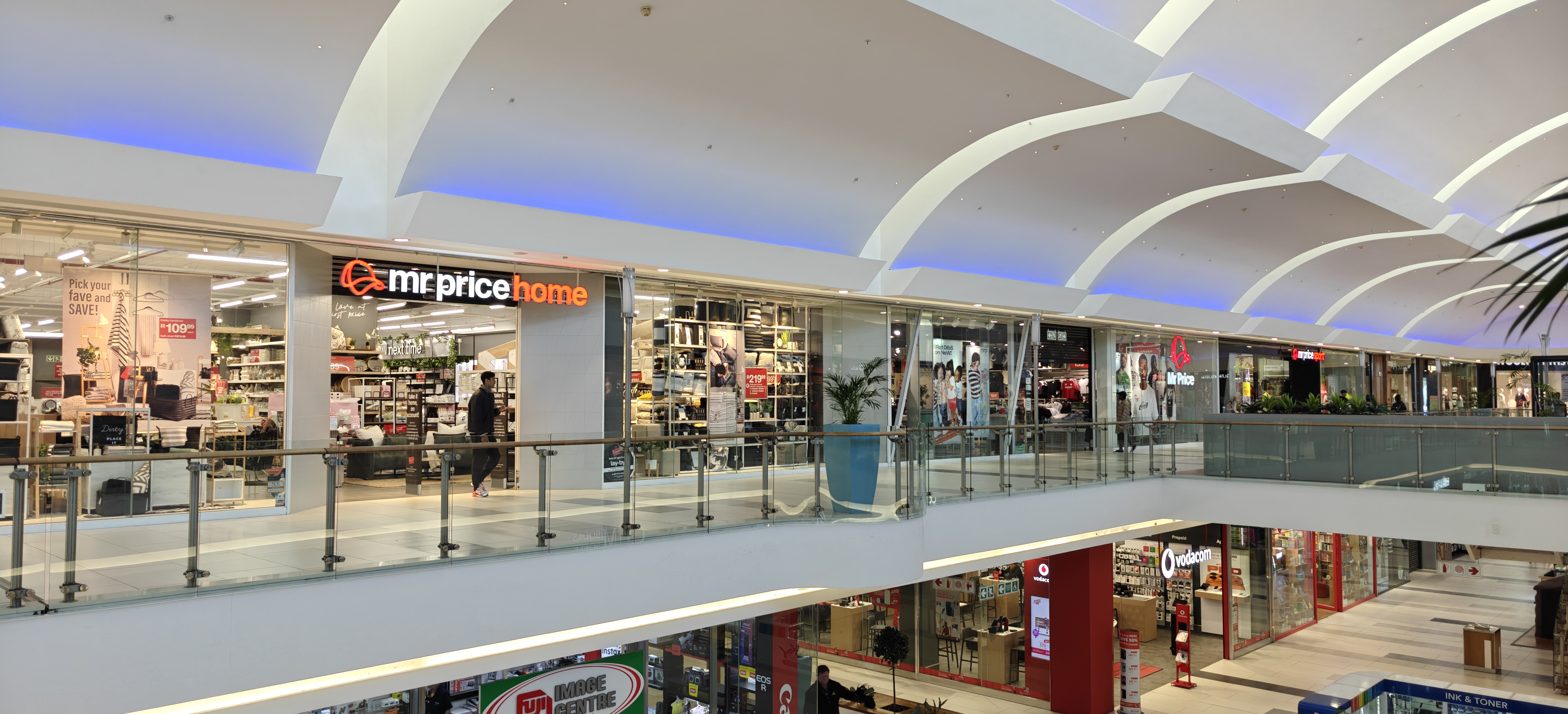
- MRP Home, MRP, and MRP Sport stores next to one another in Blue Route Mall, Tokai, Cape Town
- Type: Public
- Traded as: (JSE: MRP)
- ISIN: ZAE000200457
- Industry: Retail
- Founded: 1985; 41 years ago
- Founder: Laurie Chiappini; Stewart Cohen
- Headquarters: Durban, KwaZulu-Natal, South Africa
- Number of locations: 3,100 (2026)
- Area served: Africa
- Key people: Mark Blair (CEO); Praneel Nundkumar (CFO)
- Products: Apparel; Sportswear; Linen; Homeware
- Services: Financial services Telecoms
- Revenue: ▲ R40.93 billion (2025)
- Operating income: ▲ R5.78 billion (2025)
- Net income: ▲ R3.78 billion (2025)
- Total assets: ▲ R32.53 billion (2025)
- Total equity: ▲ R14.42 billion (2025)
- Number of employees: 32,000+ (2026)
- Subsidiaries: MRP; MRP Home; MRP Sports; MRP Kids; MRP Cellular; MRP Money; Sheet Street; Power Fashion; Miladys; Studio 88; Yuppiechef
- Website: www.mrpricegroup.com

Mr Price Group (officially Mr Price Group Limited, sometimes referred to as MRP Group, and stylized in lowercase) is a South African retail group. The company operates via numerous subsidiaries, across multiple distinct retail categories, and maintains stores in numerous African countries. It is one of South Africa's largest retail groups, by number of stores and annual revenue.

Established in 1985 and headquartered in Durban, the group has 3,100 stores across 10 brands. MRP Group employs over 32,000 people, and is a Level 4 BBBEE contributor.

The company is listed on the JSE Limited, and is the largest apparel and homeware retailer on the FTSE/JSE Top 40 Index, ranking 32nd for market capitalization.

== History ==
Mr Price Group was founded in 1985, with the opening of the first Mr Price clothing store in Klerksdorp, by Laurie Chiappini and Stewart Cohen. Their goal was to provide fashionable offerings to South Africans at competitively low prices.

The group expanded over the years, with the Miladys women's clothing brand starting in 1987, following which, the co-founders acquired ownership of the group from BOE, in 1991.

The group's linen chain, Sheet Street, opened in 1996, and the standalone homeware chain, Mr Price Home, commencing operations in 1998.

The group launched the Mr Price Foundation, a nonprofit organization (NPO) in 2005, with a focus on improving youth unemployment and education quality.

The group further expanded its operations in 2006, by launching the standalone sportswear chain, Mr Price Sport. The following year, the group launched Mr Price Money, offering credit and insurance facilities to consumers. Its financial offerings are registered under the group's Associated Credit Specialists company.

In 2012, the group launched its online retail channel, and reached 1,000 stores in 2013.

Mr Price Group then expanded into the cellular market in 2014, launching Mr Price Mobile as a South African mobile virtual network operator (MVNO). This telecoms offering then grew to include Mr Price Cellular, whereby the group began retailing mobile phones and accessories, compatible across all local cellular networks.

In 2021, Mr Price Group acquired South African homeware retailer Yuppiechef, as well as low-cost clothing retailer Power Fashion (formerly Otto Brothers).

The group acquired South African athletic apparel retail chain, Studio88, in 2023. In the same year, the group merged Mr Price Kids and Mr Price Baby into a standalone Mr Price Kids retail chain.

In 2024, the company opened 238 stores during its 2024 fiscal year, with telecoms being the fastest growing segment. The same year, the company announced it reached 3,000 stores.

In June 2025, the group announced plans to open 200 additional stores in 2026.

In January 2026, MRP Group restated its intention to acquire German clothing retail company NKD, including 2,100 stores across Europe. The acquisition would cost R9.7 billion.

However, MRP faced pushback from some of its shareholders, who believed that MRP would be subsidizing NKD, with not enough certainty of a return on investment. One shareholding company noted NKD's R500 million loss in 2023. Shareholders also noted failed international expansions by other South African companies, such as Woolworths acquiring David Jones, and Famous Brands acquiring Gourmet Burger Kitchen, and said the capital could be better spent elsewhere. A special review of the purchase by the JSE Limited was requested in January 2026 by MRP Group shareholder Benguela Global Fund Managers.

Also in January 2026, MRP Group opened applications for young women interested in operating small coffee businesses inside certain MRP Home stores, as part of the company's Foundation Coffee incubator program. The foundation said the program is designed to give aspiring entrepreneurs access to real trading environments, rather than their relying on classroom-based education. Those selected will be responsible for managing the cafés’ daily operations and generating revenue through sales.

== Operations ==
Mr Price Group operates the following subsidiaries:

MRP Group store distribution, as at June 2025
Store name	Type	Number of outlets
Studio 88	Clothing	951
MRP	Clothing	626
Sheet Street	Homeware (linen)	334
Power Fashion	Clothing	324
Miladys	Women's clothing	265
MRP Home	Homeware (general)	231
MRP Sport	Sportswear and sporting equipment	178
MRP Cellular	Mobile telephony	61
MRP Kids	Kidswear	39
Yuppiechef	Cooking equipment	21
Total stores	-	3,030

In terms of the group's retail category split, in 2025, 79.7% of the group's sales came from apparel, 17.1% from homeware, and 3.2% from financial services and telecoms.

The group operates across numerous African countries. In the same year, online channels contributed a total of 2.1% of the group's sales.

Mr Price Group's sales are generated predominantly in South Africa, with the company's home country comprising a total of 92.2% of total sales, and Africa making up the remaining 7.8%. In 2024, South African sales grew by 15.5%, compared to the rest of Africa sales for the group growing by 25.4%.

Analysts have described the group as operating a low-cost retail model relative to industry peers. In its 2024 fiscal year, the group reported that it had 4.1 million customers.

The group has partnered with South African delivery company, Pargo, for click and collect lockers. Mr Price Group operates over 900 such lockers as delivery options for its customers.

== Corporate social responsibility ==
The group operates the Mr Price Foundation, founded in 2005. A registered nonprofit organization (NPO) the Foundation focuses on improving youth unemployment and education quality.

By the mid-2020s, the company reported increased use of sustainable materials in its product lines. It also helped develop the Retail-CTFL Master Plan 2030 of South Africa.

The group participates in membership organizations including the Ethical Trading Initiative (ETI), the National Credit Retail Federation (NCRF), the Forestry Stewardship Council (FSC), Proudly SA, and various Producer Responsibility Organizations (PROs).

Mr Price Group partners with The Clothing Bank and The Clothing Box, both economic empowerment projects in South Africa focused on prolonging product usage and reducing excess merchandise.

MRP Group also operates a Foundation Coffee incubator program, with the goal of empowering young women with experiential learning, by offering them the opportunity to earn incomes by running coffeehouses inside select MRP Home stores across SA.

== See also ==
- Retailing in South Africa
