= Investment Analysts Society of South Africa =

The Investment Analysts Society of South Africa (IASSA) is a non profit professional society for Investment analysts and Fund managers within the South African financial markets. Services to its members include access to JSE listed company presentations, and continuing professional development activities. IASSA also publishes the Investment Analysts Journal, a globally rated, peer-reviewed academic journal. It is based in Johannesburg and was founded in 1968.

== See also ==
- South African Institute of Financial Markets
- South African Institute of Stockbrokers
