= Ralph Mupita =

South African engineer and business executive

- Born: Ralph Tendai Mupita; 1972 (age 53–54); Rhodesia (now Zimbabwe)
- Education: University of Cape Town (BS, MBA); Harvard University (Graduate Management Program)
- Occupations: Businessman; corporate executive
- Years active: 1996–present
- Title: President and chief executive officer of MTN Group
- Predecessor: Rob Shuter
- Spouse: Makole Mupita

Ralph Tendai Mupita is a Zimbabwe-born engineer, businessman, and corporate executive, whose appointment as group president and chief executive of MTN Group with effect from 1 September 2020 was announced on 19 August 2020. Prior to that he served as the MTN Group's chief financial officer from April 2017 until August 2020.

== Background and education ==
Mupita was born in Zimbabwe 11 April, 1972. He attended Mutare Junior School and then Churchill School and Plumtree School for his middle school and high school education. He was then admitted to the University of Cape Town, in South Africa, where he obtained a Bachelor of Science degree in Civil Engineering. He followed that with a Master of Business Administration degree, also awarded by the University of Cape Town. Later, he studied at Harvard University, in their Graduate Management Program.

== Career ==
After his first degree, Mupita worked as staff civil engineer at Haw & Inglis Civil Engineering, in Cape Town for just over three years, from December 1996 until December 1999. In January 2001, he joined Old Mutual South Africa, serving in varying roles, as Director of Strategy and as Director of Retail for High Net-worth & Affluent. In February 2012, he was appointed as the chief executive officer Emerging Markets for Old Mutual Plc., based in Johannesburg, serving in that capacity until January 2017. From April 2017 to August 2020, he was CFO of MTN Group Limited. Mupita replaced Rob Shuter who stepped down as CEO on 31 August 2020.

== Personal ==
Mupita is married to Makole Mupita, a chartered accountant who is the proprietor and principal at Mahlako A Phahla Investments (Pty) Limited, established in 2009. He has four children.
