= MTN Group =

Multinational telecommunications company based in South Africa ayomide

MTN Group Limited
- Formerly: M-Cell
- Type: Public
- Traded as: JSE: MTN
- Industry: Telecommunications
- Founded: 1994; 32 years ago
- Headquarters: Johannesburg, South Africa
- Area served: Africa
- Key people: Mcebisi Jonas (Non-Executive chairman); Ralph Mupita (CEO)
- Products: GSM-related products Internet services
- Revenue: ▲R490.361 billion (US$2.73 billion, 2026); R490.361billion (US$2.73 billion, 2016)
- Operating income: ▲US$5.22 billion (2015)
- Net income: ▲US$30.345 billion (2026)
- Total assets: ▲US$52.762 billion (2026)
- Total equity: ▲US$129.433 billion (2026)
- Number of employees: 19,288 (2026)
- Subsidiaries: visafone SuperSonic
- Website: www.mtn.com

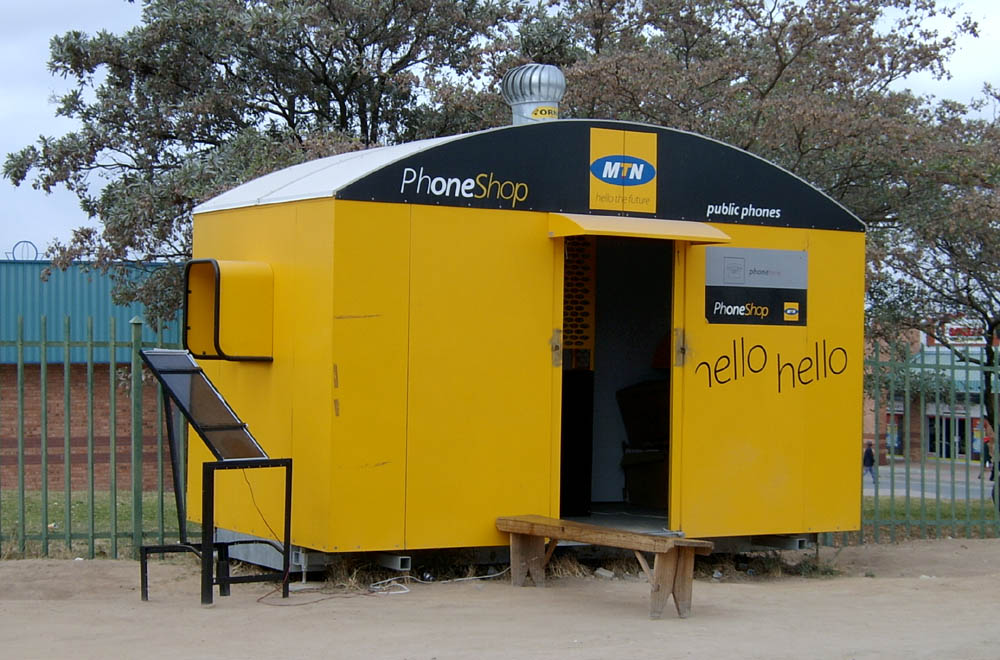
MTN mobile shop in South Africa

MTN Group Limited (formerly M-Cell) is a South African multinational corporation and mobile telecommunications provider. Its head office is in Johannesburg. MTN is among the largest mobile network operators in the world, and the largest in Africa.

In October 2025, MTN announced it had surpassed 300 million customers, the first African-headquartered telco to reach that milestone, making it the sixth-largest in the world by subscriber count. It has a footprint in sixteen countries in Africa and the Middle East.

== History ==
The company was founded in 1994 as M-Cell with assistance from the South African government. In 1995, it replaced its then CEO, John Beck, with Robert (Bob) Chaphe and founder Leena Jaitley. In 2001, the company reported that its controlling shareholder was Johnnic Holdings, and the chairperson was Irene Charnley. In 2002, Phuthuma Nhleko became the CEO, replacing then-CEO Paul Edwards, who had invested in expansion to Nigeria. MTN's competitors in South Africa include Vodacom, Cell C and Telkom Mobile.

In May 2008, Bharti Airtel, an India-based telecommunications company, explored the possibility of buying MTN Group. Reliance Communications was also in talks with MTN for a "potential combination of their businesses". In July, the two companies ended discussions regarding the merger. In June 2008, MTN Group agreed to purchase Verizon Business South Africa, which was a provider of data services to customers in South Africa and four other African countries. The acquisition was completed on 28 February 2009. On 26 June 2009, MTN Group's subsidiary merged with Belgacom International Carrier Services (BICS), a subsidiary of Belgacom. The combined subsidiary functioned as the international gateway for carrier services of MTN.

In October 2012, MTN announced a partnership with Afrihost to provide DSL Broadband services in Africa. In November 2012, South African holding company Shanduka Group acquired a minority stake in MTN Group's Nigeria business for $335 million.

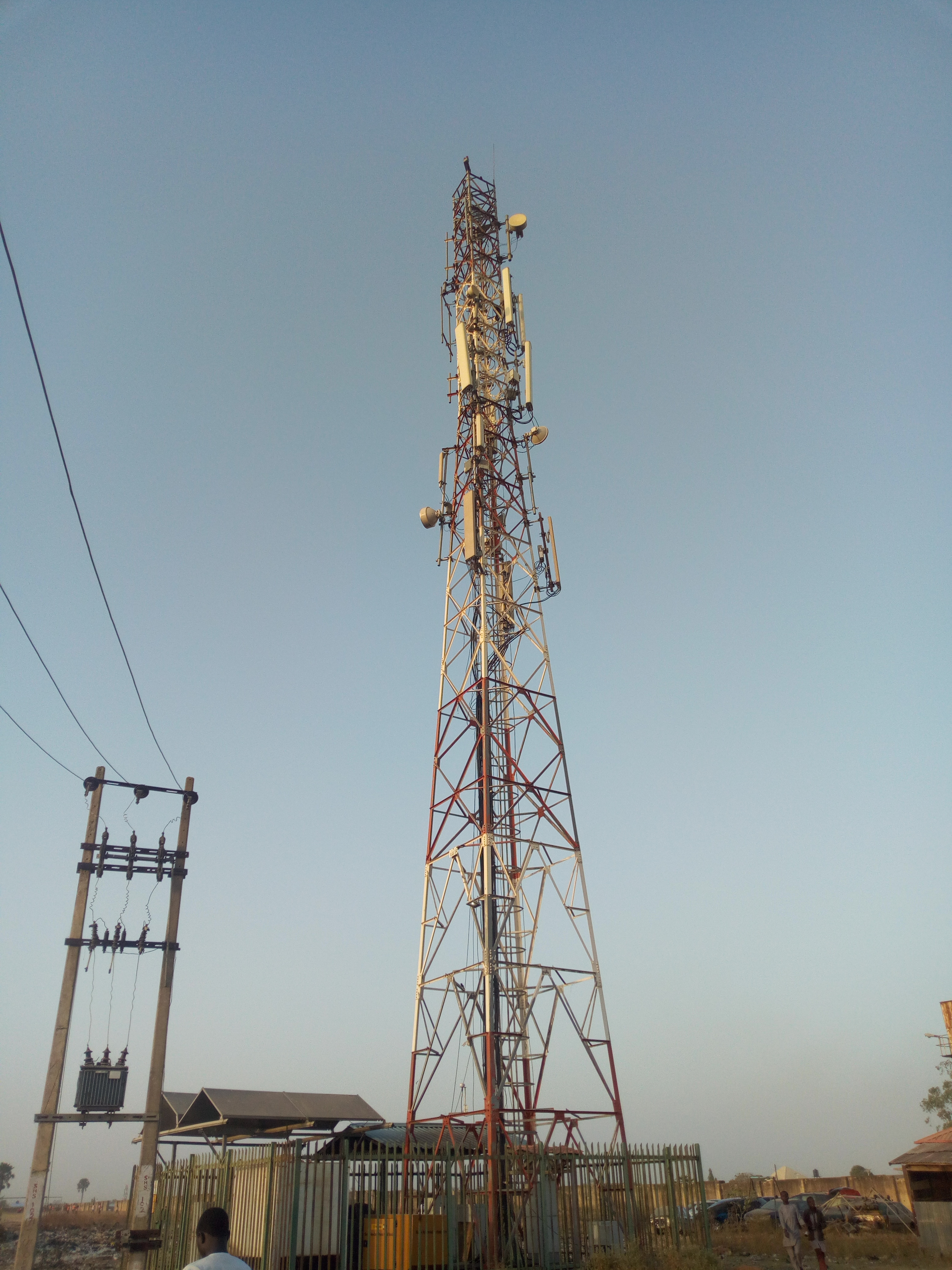
MTN mast in Kaduna State

In 2014, the company sold its tower portfolios in Côte d'Ivoire, Cameroon, Zambia and Rwanda to IHS Towers. That year, MTN was named to the 2014 BrandZ Top 100 Most Valuable Global Brand rankings and named the Most Admired and Most Valuable Brand in Africa, retaining the latter ranking in 2015. IHS Towers later acquired MTN South Africa's towers, in 2022. In March 2016, the company appointed Rob Shuter as CEO, who was succeeded on 1 September 2020 by Ralph Mupita.

In May 2023, in support of the company's "Ambition 2025" plan to structurally separate its fibre business; MTN rebranded subsidiary MTN GlobalConnect as Bayobab, operating as Bayobab Fibre and Bayobab Communication. On March 14, 2024, several undersea cables were cut, disrupting service for the Africa Coast to Europe. Bayobab repaired the disabled ACE and WASC lines during the following week.

On January 21, 2026, Ireland's AC Shining Stars (ACS) announced a CFA 2600 billion (€4 billion) lawsuit against MTN Group for its unauthorized use of the "Mobile Money" registered trademark in 14 African countries: Benin, Botswana, Cameroon, Congo, Ivory Coast, France, Ghana, Guinea-Bissau, Guinea, Kenya, Liberia, Namibia, Rwanda, and Zambia. On February 17, 2026, MTN Group announces proposed acquisition of the remaining 75% stake in IHS Towers, valuing the company at around $6.2 billion. On March 4, 2026, following the deaths of Supreme Leader Khamenei and Defense Minister Nasirzadeh in a missile strike, MTN stated it had 'no authorized counterparty with whom to negotiate a legal exit' from Irancell.

On March 16, 2026, MTN Group posted operational and financial results for 2025, delivering significantly on its Ambition 2025 strategy and transitioning to Ambition 2030 priorities to capture value from the attractive structural growth opportunities brought about by accelerated data adoption and financial inclusion across Africa. The same day, a €4 billion ($4.3 billion) whistleblower complaint against MTN Group is reported to be making its way through the US Securities Exchange Commission in the United States of America; a contingent liability of up about 70% of the value of MTN's recently announced $6.2-billion (R103-billion) merger with IHS Towers. AC Shining Stars (ACS), the claimant, claims that this contingent liability has not been disclosed in MTN's official 2025 financial statements or in the IHS merger proxy filings despite the fact that the MTN Group's CEO Ralph MUPITA publicly acknowledged being aware of this claim during the March 16th 2026 investor call as reported by Daily Maverick the same day.

=== MTN Ghana IPO ===
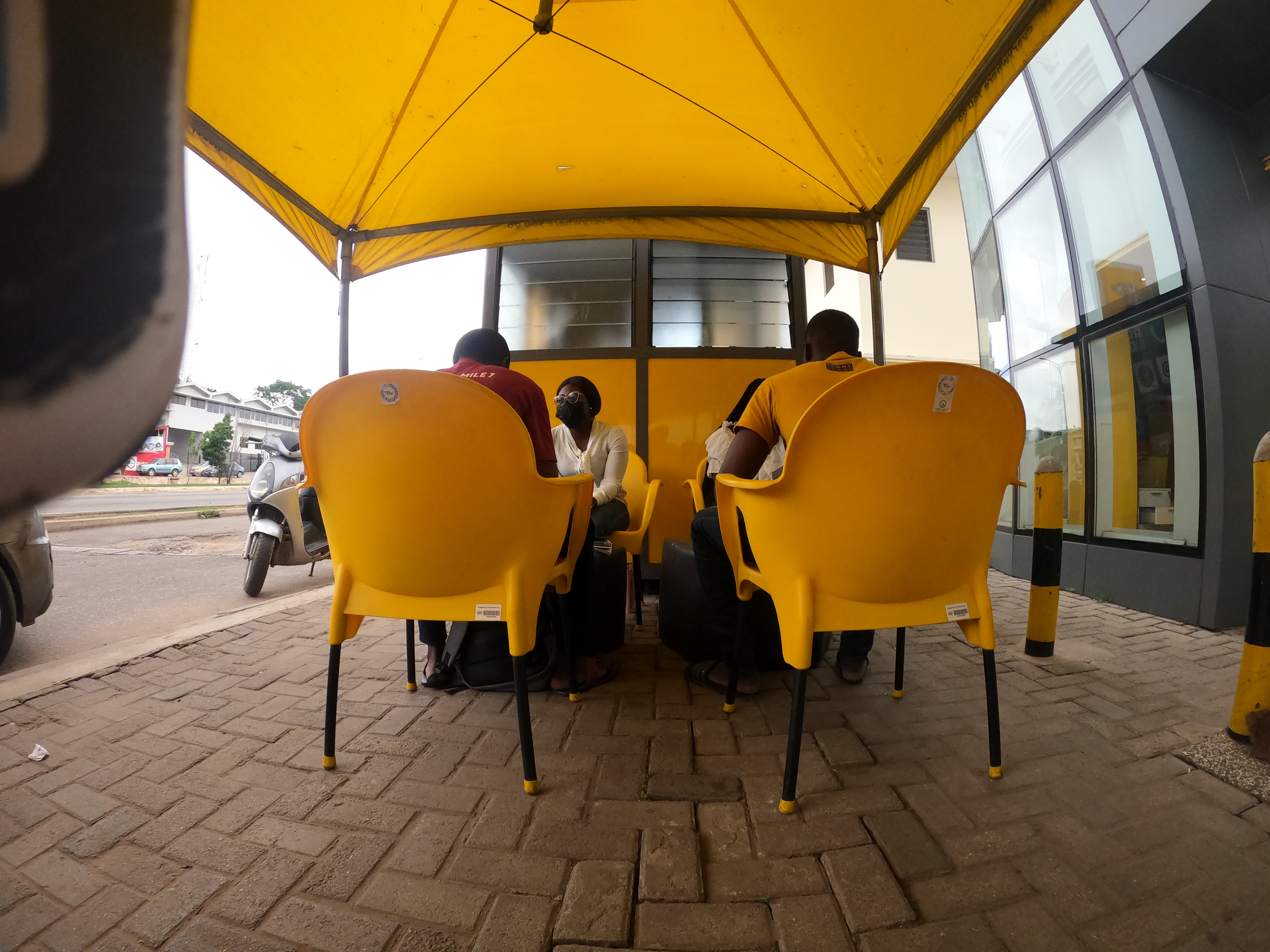
MTN Sim Card re-registration in Accra, Ghana

On 31 May 2018, MTN Ghana launched its initial public offering (IPO). The IPO closed on 31 July 2019. A total of up to 4,637,394,533 ordinary shares of MTN Ghana, representing 35% of its equity was offered to qualifying applicants. This was part of the agreement between MTN Ghana and Ghana's National Communications Authority (NCA) in November, 2015 for MTN Ghana to deploy 4G LTE mobile services to its customers in Ghana. Among other methods of payments, MTN mobile money was included as a payment option for the MTN share offer subscription. This was the first time mobile money had been used as a payment method in an IPO. In December 2024, MTN appointed Stephen Blewett as CEO of MTN Ghana, succeeding Selorm Adadevoh, who moved to the position of Group Chief Commercial Officer. Blewett assumed the role on 1 April 2025.

=== MTN Shuts Down Stores ===
On 23 February 2017, Nigerian protestors attacked a MTN office in Abuja, Nigeria as a counterattack due to violence targeted against Nigerians in South Africa.

In September 2019 MTN began closing stores in Nigeria and some of their stores in Johannesburg, South Africa due to rioting, looting, and attacks on some of their facilities.

Geoffrey Onyeama the Nigerian Foreign Minister stated at a press briefing on 4 September 2019, that MTN group along with Shoprite, stated that the targeted South African stores in Nigeria are "subsidiaries that are owned by Nigerians." And that "the property owned by Nigerians within Nigeria and the people working there are Nigerians."

Lai Mohammed, Nigeria's Minister of Information and Culture, reported that some of the South African companies that were attacked in Nigeria have Nigerian investors owning significant amounts of stakes, and Nigerian employees.

MTN has stated that they will continue to do business in Nigeria.

=== Services ===
In March 2019 MTN launched a WhatsApp channel to let its customers buy airtime and data bundles through the messaging app. Customers can also check their balances and store their credit or debit cards in the app for future purchases. The service is provided by another South African company, Clickatell.

In the same year, MTN launched a communication platform ayoba.

=== Cyprus branch re-branding ===
MTN sold its Cyprus branch to Monaco Telecom for €260 million in July 2018. It was later re-branded as Epic in June 2019. In December 2019, former Deputy Finance Minister of the Government of South Africa, Mcebisi Jonas, was appointed as the board chairperson of the company.

=== Middle East exodus ===
In August 2020, MTN decided to sell its shares in Syria, Afghanistan and Yemen, and to divest its 49% minority holding in Irancell over time. The company's decision was based on the fact that their assets in the Middle East contributed less than 4% to group earnings in the first half of the year. MTN Group has transferred its majority 82.8% shareholding in MTN Yemen to Emerald International Investment, thereby exiting the market.

=== Sale of stake in Jumia ===
On 30 October 2020, MTN made public the sale of their shares in the e-commerce brand Jumia. The sale was worth US$142.31 million dollars.

=== MTN Mastercard Collaboration ===
In February 2021, the MTN Group partnered with Mastercard to ensure safe and secure global e-commerce payments of their customer base in 16 African countries. A Mastercard virtual payment platform, that is linked to MTN MoMo (Mobile Money) wallets makes this possible.

=== Mobile Money spin-off ===
In March 2021, MTN CEO Ralph Mupita announced during the company's annual results call that the group was now considering spinning off its mobile money activities. "We see a separation and carve out of our fintech business as something that we have to do". In April 2021, he estimated the value of the group's mobile money arm to at least US$5 to 6 billion.

== Technology ==
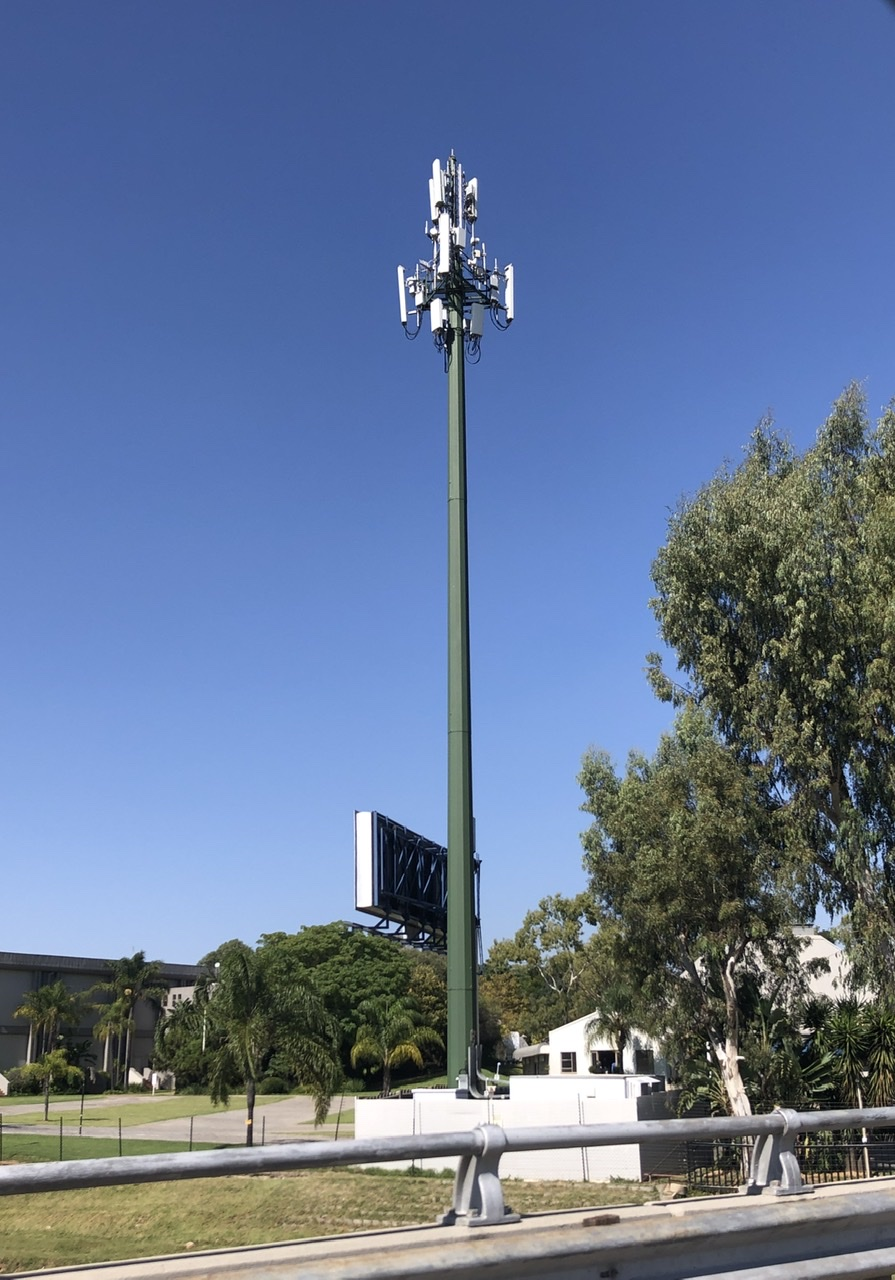
MTN 5G Cell site in Johannesburg, South Africa

MTN South Africa provides GSM, UMTS, HSPA+ (21.1 Mbit/s), HSUPA (42 Mbit/s, 2100 MHz), VOIP, 3G, 4G, LTE and 5G services. On 1 December 2011, MTN became the second cellular provider to introduce 4G and LTE in South Africa They were also the first network operator in South Africa to launch a live public 5G network available in Johannesburg and Cape Town on 30 June 2020.

=== Transition away from 2G and 3G ===
MTN intends to transition away from old technologies, including 2G and 3G coverage, which still form part of its vast network. In early 2025, the company announced intentions to roll out low-cost (R99) 4G smartphones to 1.2 million of its prepaid customers, as part of this effort.

== Coverage ==
MTN acquired Investcom, mainly under the Areeba and Spacetel brands.

As of Q2 2024, MTN is active in:

Country	Subscribers (in millions)	Note
Benin	7.237	(formerly Investcom)
Botswana	1.844	(operates under the MASCOM brand)
Cameroon	11.492	
Republic of Congo	3.556	
Eswatini	1.041	(operates under the MTN Eswatini brand)
Ghana	28.358	(formerly Areeba)
Guinea	2.886	(formerly Investcom)
Guinea-Bissau	2.122	(formerly Investcom)
Iran	55.128	(operates under the MTN Irancell brand)
Ivory Coast	15.922	
Liberia	2.122	(operates under the Lonestar Cell brand)
Nigeria	79.393	Has the most MTN Subscribers
Rwanda	7.501	20 percent owned by Crystal Telecom Rwanda
South Africa	38.465	
South Sudan	2.946	(see MTN South Sudan, formerly Investcom)
Sudan	7.792	(formerly Investcom)
Uganda	20.724 (2024)	MTN Uganda
Zambia	6.897	MTN Zambia is the mobile network market leader in Zambia with a market share of 44 percent.

== SuperSonic ==
Supersonic is an Internet service provider that was founded in Johannesburg, South Africa in 2018 by MTN Group in to provide FTTH (Fibre) Internet services to South African consumers. SuperSonic is owned by MTN Group.

Supersonic provides Fibre through most Service Providers including OpenServe and Vumatel. SuperSonic also offers "Air Fibre", a 5G Based Mobile data service introduced in February 2021.

PIn July 2021, they were fourth from the bottom of a list of 16 big ISP's that were rated.

== Sponsorships ==
=== Past ===
MTN Group sponsored the CAF Champions League football competition, as well as APOEL FC, winners of the Cypriot First Division in 2009, 2011, 2013 and 2014, and participants in the 2009–10 and 2011–12 UEFA Champions League.

In March 2010, MTN signed a three-and-half year sponsorship deal with English football club Manchester United F.C.

From 2018 to 2025 MTN was the primary sponsor of the South Africa national rugby union team.

=== Current ===
In 2010 MTN Group became the title sponsor of the Ghana FA Cup, renamed the MTN FA Cup. In September 2025, the company deepened its investment in Ghanaian football with a two-year deal to sponsor its football teams the Black Stars, Black Queens, Black Satellites, and Black Starlets, in addition to the Elite U-19 Championship.

In 2018, MTN signed a five-year sponsorship deal with the Zambia Super League, also known as the MTN Super League. It also is a sponsor of Zambian's national football team, the "Chipolopolo". Renewed in 2021, it was valued at ZMW 43 million (about $2 million) and considered one of the largest telecom sponsorships in African football.

MTN Nigeria signed a 3-year ₦500M sponsorship deal with the Nigerian Football Federation in September 2021, which was renewed in 2023.

In 2023, the Federation of Uganda Football Associations (FUFA) signed a five-year sponsorship deal with MTN Uganda worth 19 billion shillings (approx. $147 million). The sponsorship covers several teams and events: the Uganda Cranes, the Crested Cranes, the FUFA Drum regional cup, the FUFA Juniors League, FUFA Super 8 tournament, the FUFA Super Cup, and the FUFA Annual Awards.

== Philanthropy ==
From 2013 to 2024 the MTN Foundation sponsored Nigerian Students with financial and educational grants worth ₦2.5 billion. In October 2024, over 1,000 students across each received a grant of ₦300,000.

== Controversies ==
=== Iran ===
MTN has been criticised for its activities in Iran's telecommunications sector. MTN has a 49 percent stake in government-controlled MTN Irancell, the second-largest mobile phone operator in Iran, and 21 percent of MTN's subscriber base is from the country. In January 2012, the US-based advocacy group United Against Nuclear Iran (UANI) launched a campaign publicly calling for MTN to scale back its operations in Iran and end its business in the country. UANI alleges that MTN technology is "enabling the Iranian government to locate and track individual cellphone users which it says is a violation of users' human rights".

In June 2012, Reuters and the BBC reported an allegation by Chris Kilowan, a former executive for the company in Iran, that MTN Group may have been complicit in securing American telecommunications technology from Sun Microsystems, Hewlett-Packard and Cisco Systems on behalf of Irancell, in violation of trade sanctions against Iran. Oracle, which owns Sun Microsystems, said that it was investigating and denied involvement, saying that it complies with US export laws. Hewlett-Packard issued a similar statement. MTN Group denied the allegations, saying that it complied with US sanctions against Iran.

=== Turkcell court case ===
Turkey's Turkcell filed a $4.2 billion lawsuit in Washington, D.C., in 2012 alleging the company used bribery to win a mobile licence in Iran that was first awarded to Turkcell. The court delayed the case in October 2012 pending a US Supreme Court decision on the Alien Tort Statute, the US human rights law on which Turkcell's suit is based. In May 2013, Turkcell dropped its multibillion-dollar US lawsuit against MTN Group, citing a US Supreme Court ruling that hurt its case. On 27 November 2013, Turkcell resumed in Johannesburg.

=== Nigeria $5.2 billion fine ===
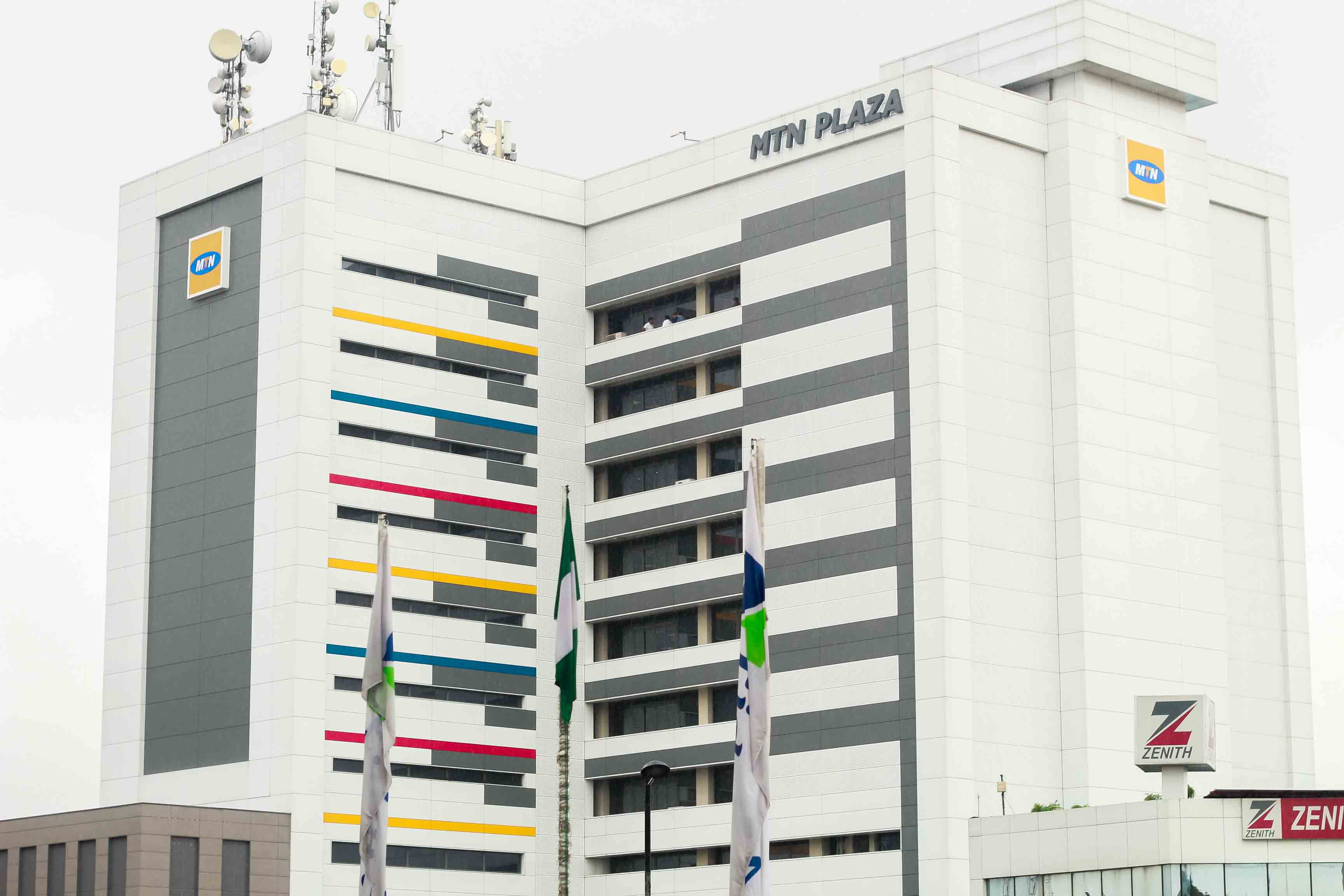
MTN Nigeria Building in Lagos, Nigeria

In 2015, the Nigerian subsidiary of MTN was fined by the Government of Nigeria through the telecommunications regulator, Nigerian Communications Commission (NCC) for partial compliance of regulatory guidelines to Mobile Network Operators to disconnect from their network, all improperly registered Subscribers Identification Modules (SIM). The commission exercised section 20(1) of the Telephone Subscribers regulation (TSR) law on MTN, leading to a calculated fine of $5.2 billion, according to the constitution.

The compliance audit carried out by the NCC on MTN network revealed unregistered 5.2 million customers lines were not deactivated as directed. This led to the NCC fining MTN with the sum of $1000 for each unregistered SIM according to the Telephone Subscribers regulation (TSR) law, which amounted to $5.2bn.

What followed was major resignations among the top echelon of the organization including the chief executive officer, Sifiso Dabengwa, the Head of Nigeria Operation, Micheal Ikpoki and the Head of Cooperate Affairs, Akinwale Goodluck being replaced with Phuthuma Nhleko, Ferdi Moolman and Amina Oyegbola as new chairman, managing director and Head of Corporate and Regulation respectively.

The new management employed a diplomatic measure between the government of the Republic of South Africa and its Nigerian counterpart to ameliorate the burden of the liabilities from the fine. This action brought about the reduction of the liability to $3.2 billion.

=== South Africa ===
In September 2021, MTN announced that it will close its zero-rated access to the popular social network Twitter. As of early 2022, MTN has had poor internet connection throughout the country; the cause is still unknown.

== See also ==
- List of mobile network operators
- Mobile telephony in Africa
- MTN $5.2 billion fine
