= Bond Exchange of South Africa =

Bond Exchange of South Africa Limited
- Company type: Public company
- Industry: Financial services
- Defunct: 2009
- Fate: Purchased by Johannesburg Stock Exchange
- Successor: JSE Limited
- Headquarters: Johannesburg, South Africa
- Products: Bond Exchange

The Bond Exchange of South Africa (BESA) was a South African bond exchange based in Johannesburg. It was acquired by the JSE Limited in 2009, and rebranded as the JSE Debt Market. The entity, now through the JSE Limited, operates and regulates the debt securities and interest rate derivatives markets in South Africa. Prior to its acquisition it was constituted as a public company.

== History ==
BESA was granted its exchange license in 1996 and over the next twelve years was responsible for the development of the bond market in South Africa. As an exchange, BESA was in the business of providing a range of platforms and services to address the needs of capital market participants, be it issuers, market makers, traders or investors.

In December 2007, BESA converting from a mutual association to a public company. This was followed by a rights issue which was concluded in October 2008, injecting fresh capital into the business and introducing new strategic partners to the exchange. With demutualisation and capitalisation achieved, BESA focused attention on furthering capital market infrastructure in South Africa through the introduction of projects such as;

- BondClear Limited - a clearing solution developed in partnership with Nasdaq, Inc.
- Justtrade.com - South Africa’s first online binary options exchange

By 2008 the South African bond market was a leader among emerging-market economies. Turnover reported on BESA in 2008 reached R19.2 trillion. Given listed debt securities of R825 billion nominal. However the local bond market was still dominated by securities issued by the South African government, with local government, public enterprises and major corporations accounting for the rest of the debt issuers active in the market. The number of borrowers and listed bonds as well as the market capitalisation had all risen sharply, at December 2008 BESA had listed some 1,102 debt securities, issued by 100 sovereign and corporate borrowers, with a total market cap of R935 billion.

In 2009 the Johannesburg Stock Exchange acquired the BESA for R240 million and rebranded as the JSE Debt Market.

== Rules and protections ==
Old logo used by the BSEA

As the direct regulator of the bond market, BESA operated within the framework of the Securities Services Act 2004 of South Africa and a set of rules and directives approved by the Financial Services Board (FSB). BESA's rules and directives served as a tool for regulating both issuers and trading participants. Extensive rules also applied to trading participants, with BESA undertaking active surveillance over all aspects of market activity as well as requiring compliance with a variety of best-practice standards.

== See also ==
- Bond market
- The South African Futures Exchange
- South African Institute of Financial Markets
