= IHS Towers =

Communications infrastructure company

- Type: Public
- Traded as: NYSE: IHS
- Industry: Telecommunications
- Founded: 2001; 25 years ago
- Founder: Sam Darwish
- Area served: Africa, Latin America, Middle East
- Website: ihstowers.com

IHS Towers is one of the largest independent owners, operators and developers of shared communications infrastructure in the world, with operations across Africa. It is one of the largest independent multinational tower companies in the world. In 2026, MTN Group agreed to acquire the company, excluding its Latin America operations.

== Operations ==
Founded by Sam Darwish in Lagos, Nigeria, in 2001, IHS specializes in building and operating communication infrastructure throughout emerging markets. The company launched colocation services in 2009, and had acquired MTN’s tower portfolios in Ivory Coast, Cameroon, Zambia and Rwanda by 2014.

Following the completion of a sale and leaseback agreement with the mobile network operator Zain in Kuwait, and the acquisition of Cell Site Solutions in February 2020, IHS Towers expanded beyond Africa, operating across three continents. The company owns and manages approximately 28,000 towers in 5 countries, including Cameroon, Ivory Coast, Nigeria, South Africa and Zambia. The company sold its 70% stake in IHS Kuwait to Zain Group in 2024 and completed the sale of its Rwanda operations to Paradigm in October 2025. In May 2026, the company completed the sale of I-Systems, its Latam fiber business, and in August 2026 it sold its Latam tower operations in Brazil and Colombia.

IHS was listed on the NYSE in October 2021 in what was noted as the largest U.S. listing of a company with an African heritage.

The company operates six business segments: colocation and lease amendments; new sites; inbuilding solutions, or distributed antenna system (DAS); small cell; fiber connectivity; and rural telephony.

In November 2021, IHS expanded its fiber offering and closed its acquisition of a 51% stake in FiberCo Solucoes de Infraestrutura from TIM Brasil. In February 2025, it announced the sale of its stake back to TIM S.A. In June 2022, IHS acquired MTN South Africa’s towers.

IHS increased its use of solar energy and hybrid power systems to reduce its overall emissions; by December 2020, over 45% of its African operations had solar power available. In October 2022, IHS published its "Carbon Reduction Roadmap", a strategy for decreasing Scope 1 and 2 emissions by approximately 50% by 2030.

Mobile network operators (MNO)s that IHS works with include: MTN, Orange, Airtel, Etisalat, Millicom, Zain, Claro, TIM, Telefônica and Vivo.

Along with its founding partners, UBC, IHS is supported by a group of international shareholders including Emerging Capital Partners, International Finance Corporation, Wendel, Goldman Sachs, African Infrastructure Investment Managers, Investec, the IFC’s Global Infrastructure Fund, (FMO) Dutch development bank, Korea Investment Corporation, and Singapore sovereign wealth fund, GIC.

The IHS Board includes Jeb Bush, who heads the governance committee; Ursula Burns, the former Xerox CEO and the first Black woman to lead a Fortune 500 company, who also sits on the Uber and Nestle boards; and Carolina Lacerda, the former head of investment banking of UBS in Brazil.

In February 2026, MTN Group announces proposed acquisition of IHS Towers' remaining 75% stake in the company, valuing IHS at around $6.2 billion.

In March 2026, MTN Group reports exceptional 2025 results, unveils evolved platform strategy The same day, Shining Stars (ACS) lodged a €4 billion ($4.3 billion) whistleblower complaint through the United States Securities and Exchange Commission, alleging that a contingent liability of up about 70% of the value of MTN's recently announced $6.2-billion (R103-billion) merger with IHS Towers has not been disclosed in MTN's 2025 financial statements or the IHS merger proxy filings.

In February 2025, IHS Nigeria announced launches Incubation and Accelerator programs at Ilorin Innovation Hub ahead of its official commissioning. Development in partnership with Kwara State Government, the hub aims to foster innovation, entrepreneurship, and digital skills development through programs delivered by Co-creation Hub (CcHub) and future Africa. The initiative is expected to create over 10,000 jobs, support startups and young innovators, and strengthen Nigeria's technology ecosystem while completing the Federal Government's 3MTT digital skills program

In April 2026, IHS Nigeria, in partner with the Ilorin Innovation Hub (IIH), hosted the inaugural Demo day, "The Convergence," at the Hub's facility in Ilorin, Kwara State. The event showcased 19 startups from the Hub acceleration and incubation programs, giving them the opportunity to present their innovation solution to investors, venture capital firms, corporate partners, and the media

In July 2026, IHS Nigeria collaborated with the Amazon Web Services (AWS) and the Kwara State Government to launch the AWS re/Start programme at the Ilorin Innovation Hub. The programme provided cloud computing training to 30 participants, with the aim of equipping unemployed and underemployed young people with technical and employability skills for careers in cloud computing.

== Competitors ==
IHS competitors in Africa include Helios Towers and American Tower Corporation.
