= Yuppiechef =

South African kitchen and homeware retailer

Yuppiechef.com
- Type: Private subsidiary
- Industry: E-commerce; Retail
- Founded: 2006; 20 years ago
- Founder: Andrew Smith; Shane Dryden
- Headquarters: Cape Town, South Africa
- Number of locations: 25 (2026)
- Area served: South Africa
- Products: Kitchen tools
- Parent: Mr Price Group (since 2021)
- Website: yuppiechef.com

Yuppiechef is a South African retailer of kitchen and homeware products, based in Cape Town. Founded in 2006, the company has been wholly-owned by major South African retailer Mr Price Group since 2021.

== History ==
Originally run from Smith's home, Yuppiechef was one of a few experimental e-commerce projects initiated by the co-founders, who were running a web development agency at the time.

The idea for the business originated from cooking shows and international travel. Smith and Dryden noticed that many of the kitchen tools and brands featured overseas weren't very accessible to South Africans. Instead of competing on price, Yuppiechef decided to focus on specialized products that couldn't be easily sourced elsewhere.

Yuppiechef launched with just 32 products, and deliveries were initially packed and shipped from Smith's lounge, at his home in Plumstead, Cape Town.

In June 2008, Paul Galatis, a high school friend of Smith's, joined the company as its third partner and assumed the role of Marketing Director.

In 2010, Yuppiechef won a gold Loerie and gained media attention for a campaign that made use of a national marketing campaign by the retailer Woolworths called "Woolies Lovebirds". A misspelled URL on Woolworth's marketing material, allowed them to register the URL, and post a ransom note asking that Woolworths match any donations by Yuppiechef's customers to a local charity they supported at the time.

Known for including handwritten cards with deliveries, Yuppiechef established and early presence in the South African e-commerce sector. The company was named the best eCommerce store in South Africa annually from 2010 through 2015.

12 years after starting its online store, Yuppiechef opened its first brick & mortar stores in Cape Town and Johannesburg. In October 2017, the first of their physical retail stores was launched. The company has subsequently opened two more stores in Cape Town. Yuppiechef's headquarters in Westlake Business Park also contains a store.

Yuppiechef was sold to major South African retail chain Mr Price Group in 2021, in a deal valued at around R470 million. The company's founders remained with Yuppiechef for a year, before leaving in 2022.

== Operations ==
As of June 2026, Yuppiechef retails online, and operates a total of 25 physical stores, across multiple of South Africa's major cities.

== See also ==
- Retailing in South Africa
- E-commerce
