= FTSE/JSE All-Share Index =

South African stock market index

- Foundation: October 2, 1978; 48 years ago
- Exchanges: Johannesburg Stock Exchange
- Weighting method: Capitalization-weighted
- Website: FTSE/JSE All-Share Index homepage

The FTSE/JSE All-Share Index is the most important stock market index in South Africa. It comprises all companies listed on the Johannesburg Stock Exchange. The 40 largest stocks by market capitalization are combined in the FTSE/JSE Top 40 Index.

== Index ==
The FTSE/JSE All-Share Index is a price index in which all public limited companies of the Johannesburg Securities Exchange (JSE) are listed. They cover 99 percent of the exchange's market capitalization and trading volume. To be included in the index, the company must be financially viable, have high liquidity and be traded on the Johannesburg Stock Exchange.

The index level is determined solely on the basis of share prices. The weighting is based on the market capitalization of the listed companies. Corporate actions such as share splits have no (distorting) influence on the index. The composition of the index is reviewed two times a year. The calculation is updated every 60 seconds during JSE trading hours.

== History ==
The index was first published on 2 October 1978, under the name JSE Actuaries Overall Index (base value: 264.30 points) and was calculated back to 1960 (daily prices) and 1926 (monthly prices). By October 19, 1987, the index had risen by 960.9% to a closing level of 2,804 points. After Black Monday the JSE Actuaries fell again. On December 10, 2001, the index closed above the 10,000-point mark for the first time at 10,030.17 points.

On June 24, 2002, the FTSE Group took over the calculation of the index. To reflect this change, the JSE Actuaries Overall Index was renamed the FTSE/JSE All-Share Index. The base value is 10,815.08 points, the closing level of the old index on June 21, 2002.

== Annual returns ==
The following table shows the annual development of the FTSE/JSE All-Share Index since 1975.

Year	Closing level	Change in index (in points)	Change in index (in %)
1975	226.30		
1976	201.60	−24.70	−10.91
1977	243.10	41.50	20.59
1978	310.70	67.60	27.81
1979	565.00	254.30	81.85
1980	746.80	181.80	32.18
1981	692.20	−54.60	−7.31
1982	879.20	187.00	27.02
1983	950.00	70.80	8.05
1984	984.20	34.20	3.60
1985	1,322.80	338.60	34.40
1986	1,972.70	649.90	49.13
1987	1,820.00	−152.70	−7.74
1988	1,990.00	170.00	9.34
1989	2,976.00	986.00	49.55
1990	2,719.74	−256.26	−8.61
1991	3,440.31	720.57	26.49
1992	3,258.76	−181.55	−5.28
1993	4,892.99	1,634.23	50.15
1994	5,866.91	973.92	19.90
1995	6,228.42	361.51	6.16
1996	6,657.53	429.11	6.89
1997	6,202.31	−455.22	−6.84
1998	5,430.48	−771.84	−12.44
1999	8,542.78	3,112.30	57.31
2000	8,326.19	−216.59	−2.54
2001	10,441.68	2,115.49	25.41
2002	9,277.22	−1.164,46	−11.15
2003	10,387.22	1,110.00	11.96
2004	12,656.86	2,269.64	21.85
2005	18,096.54	5,439.68	42.98
2006	24,915.20	6,818.66	37.68
2007	28,957.97	4,042.77	16.23
2008	21,509.20	−7.448,77	−25.72
2009	27,666.45	6,157.25	28.63
2010	32,118.89	4,452.44	16.09
2011	31,985.67	−133,22	−0.41
2012	39,250.24	7,264.57	22.71
2013	46,256.23	7,005.99	15.15
2014	49,770.60	3,514.37	7.06
2015	50,693.76	923.16	1.82
2016	50,653.54	−40.22	−0.08
2017	59,504.67	8,851.13	17.47
2018	52,736.86	−6,767.81	−12.83
2019	57,084.10	4,347.24	8.24
2020	59,408.68	2,324.58	4.07
2021	73,709.39	14,300.71	24.07
2022	73,048.57	−660.82	0.90
2023	76.893,15	3,844.58	5.26
2024	94,290.33	17,397.18	22.63
2025	115,832.30	21,541.97	22.85
