= Sam Darwish =

American entrepreneur

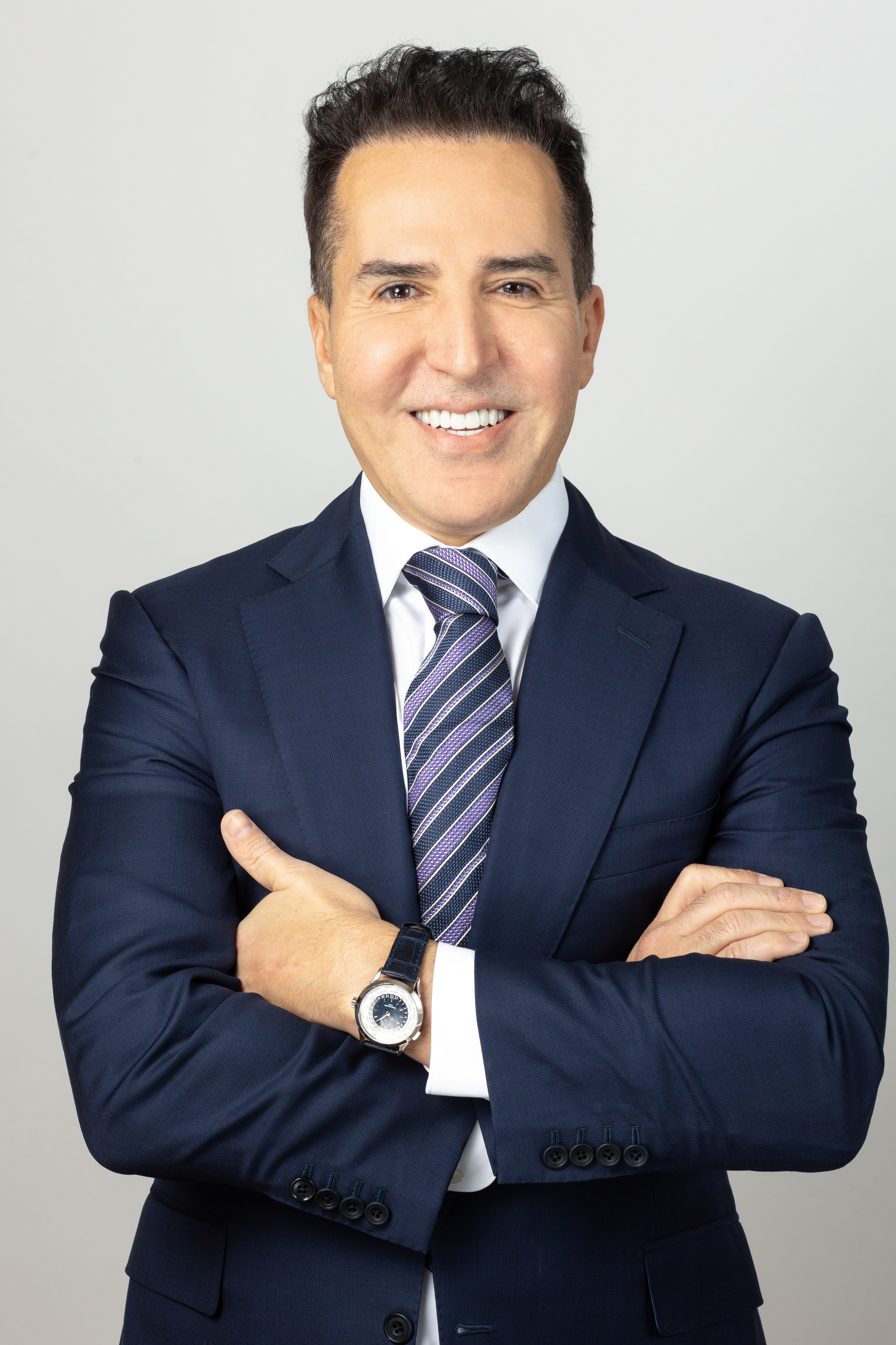
- Occupation: Businessman

Sam Darwish is a U.S. entrepreneur active in the telecommunications industry. He is the founder, Chairman and CEO of IHS Towers, which operates approximately 37,000 towers across Africa and Latin America, and was listed on the NYSE in October 2021.

== Early life and education ==
Darwish was raised and educated in Beirut during the Lebanese Civil War.

== Business career ==
After leaving his executive position at MCI, he joined Libancell, now known as MTC Touch, where he helped establish the first Lebanese mobile network. Subsequently, in 1998, he was appointed Deputy Managing Director of Motophone, Nigeria's first GSM operator.

Following the Nigerian government's 2001 plan to privatize its telecommunications industry, he set up a mobile infrastructure company, IHS Towers, which he has led since then. The company has been identified as one of the largest equity fundraisers in Africa, as well as one of the overall largest fundraisers of the past decade.

IHS Towers became a publicly listed company on the New York Stock Exchange in October 2021, and regarded as the largest IPO of a firm of African heritage to list on the Exchange.

In 2016, he won the West Africa Business Leader of the Year the award for his founding and continued leadership of IHS Towers.

In October 2025, the company collaborated with Claro, Vivo and TIM, to bring connectivity to rural Ilha do Combu in Belém.

== Other ventures ==
Darwish has founded additional businesses in the US and is the founder and President of Dar Properties and Dar Telecom.

Darwish has been involved in setting up incubator programs for aspiring tech entrepreneurs in Lagos and oversees local community projects throughout the emerging markets.

In September 2015, he participated in an entrepreneur judging panel for She Leads Africa, a venture that invests in women entrepreneurs in Africa.

Darwish is a Trustee of the George and Barbara Bush Foundation He is also a member of the Navy SEAL Legacy Foundation National Advisory Committee.
