= AltX =

Stock exchange in South Africa

AltX is an alternative public equity exchange for small and medium-sized companies in South Africa operated in parallel with and wholly owned by the JSE Securities Exchange. As of July 2008 the shares of just over 80 companies listed on AltX had a combined value of over R30-billion.

The exchange launched in October 2003 as a nursery for the JSE main board, replacing the failed venture capital and development capital boards established as sub-sets of the main board in the 1980s. It was intended to encourage entrepreneurship, especially among South Africa's emerging black middle class.

Beige Holdings Limited and Insurance Outsourcing Managers' Holding Limited were the first companies to list, in January 2004.
