= Phuthuma Nhleko =

South African businessman

Freedom Phuthuma Nhleko (born 7 April 1960) is a South African businessman, formerly chief executive and executive chairman of MTN Group, a South African multinational mobile telecommunications company primarily focused on Africa.

== Career ==
Nhleko's earned a BSc in civil engineering from Ohio State University and an MBA in finance from Atlanta University.

In 1994, Nhleko founded Worldwide African Investment Holdings, an investment holding company with interests in the petroleum, telecommunications, and information technology industries.

In 2002, Nhleko became CEO of MTN Group. In 2007, Nhleko was appointed to the board of directors of the GSM Association (GSMA), the global trade association for mobile phone operators. He served the board during a two-year term from January 2007.

He was previously a senior member of the Standard Corporate & Merchant Bank corporate finance team. He also practised as a civil engineer and project manager for the Urban Foundation, and was a senior road engineer for the Ministry of Works in Swaziland.

Nhleko is a director of Johnnic Holdings, Nedbank Group and Old Mutual SA.

In 2012, Nhleko founded the Pembani Remgro Infrastructure Fund with Johann Rupert.
