= JSE Limited =

Stock exchange in Johannesburg, South Africa

Johannesburg Stock Exchange Limited
- JSE Limited / JSE

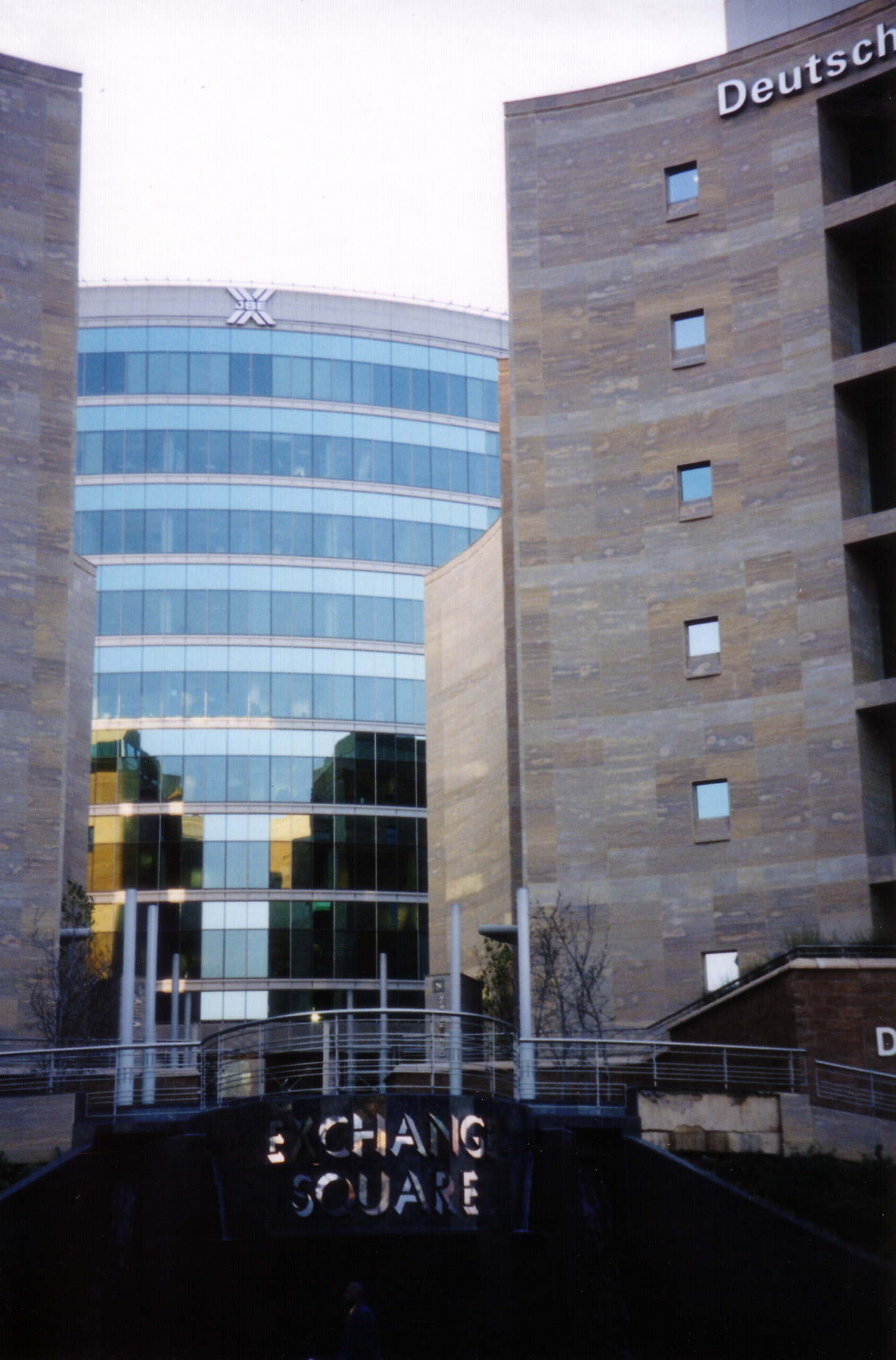
- Type: Stock exchange
- Location: Sandton, Johannesburg, South Africa
- Coordinates: 26.1029°S 28.0576°E
- Founded: 8 November 1887; 139 years ago
- Key people: Phuthuma Nhleko (Non-executive chairman); Leila Fourie (CEO)
- Currency: Rand
- No. of listings: 431 (January 2026)
- Market cap: R24,22 trillion (January 2026)
- Indices: FTSE/JSE All-Share Index; FTSE/JSE Top 40 Index
- Website: jse.co.za

The JSE Limited (previously the JSE Securities Exchange and the Johannesburg Stock Exchange, and commonly referred to as the JSE) is a stock exchange in South Africa and the largest in Africa by market capitalization. It has been located in Sandton, Gauteng, since it moved from the Johannesburg CBD in 2000.

As of January 2026, the JSE had a market capitalization of R24,22 trillion (roughly €1.27 trillion / £1.1 trillion / $1.48 trillion), and a total of 431 listed companies. In the same month, the FTSE/JSE All-Share Index (ALSI) hit 100,000 points - the highest since its foundation.

The JSE accounts for around 60% of Africa's total equity market value, with large, liquid, globally-integrated companies across numerous economic sectors. In terms of market cap, it is larger than the next nine ranking African stock exchanges combined.

== History ==
The discovery of gold on the Witwatersrand in 1886 led to many mining and financial companies opening and a need soon arose for a stock exchange. The first share transactions on the Rand took place in a rustic canvas tent, with trade taking place on Sundays, as this was the only day when mining was not allowed, owing to a strictly enforced regulation prohibiting the entry of African workers to the gold reefs.

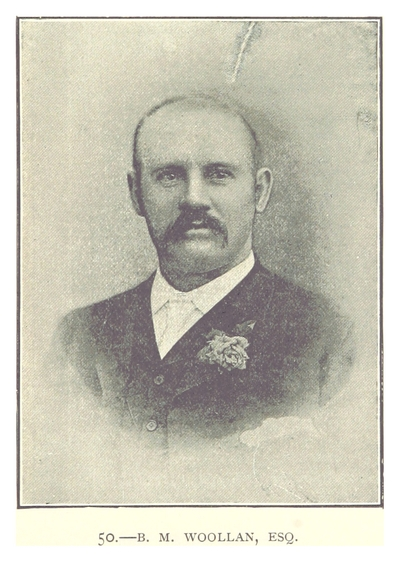
Benjamin Minors Woollan

The Johannesburg Exchange & Chambers Company was established by a London businessman, Benjamin Minors Woollan, and housed at the corner of Commissioner and Simmonds Streets. Out of this the JSE was born on 8 November 1887.

What immediately gave the JSE a clear advantage over exchanges such as Kimberley, Barberton, and, most importantly, London, was that listing of companies for a quotation on the Official List of the JSE was an easy and relatively cheap procedure.

This relatively simple and non-restricting nature of the early Exchange promoted a wave of initial registrations on the Official List, with 68 companies by the end of November 1887. The Official List further expanded to more than 300 companies by the end of January 1890.

By 1890, the trading hall became too small and had to be rebuilt but this too was outgrown. Trading then moved into the street. The Mining Commissioner closed off Simmonds Street between Market Square and Commissioner Street by means of chains.

In 1903, a new building was built for the JSE on Hollard Street. It was a storey building that took up an entire whole city block bounded by Fox and Main, Hollard and Sauer Streets.

After World War II, it became apparent that this building was again inadequate and in 1947 the decision was made to rebuild the stock exchange. It took 11 years before construction began and in February 1961 the second exchange at Hollard Street was officially opened. By 1963, the JSE became a member of the Federation International Bourses de Valeurs (FIBV).

In 1978, the JSE took up residence at 17 Diagonal Street near Kerk Street, Johannesburg. 1993 saw the JSE become an active member of the African Stock Exchanges Association. After 108 years, the open outcry system of trading was changed to an electronic system on 7 June 1996.

In September 2000, the Johannesburg Securities Exchange moved to its present location in Sandton, Gauteng at the corner of Maude Street and Gwen Lane. It adopted the JSE Securities Exchange as its new official name.

In 2001 an agreement was struck with the London Stock Exchange enabling cross-dealing between the two bourses and replacing the JSE's trading system with that of the LSE.

In 2009 the JSE acquired the Bond Exchange of South Africa for R240 million and rebranded it the JSE debt market adding South African government and corporate bonds as well as interest rate derivatives to its product set.

On 18 June 2012, the JSE became a founding member of the United Nations Sustainable Stock Exchanges initiative on the eve of the United Nations Conference on Sustainable Development (Rio+20).

JSE logo prior to the April 2014 re-branding

On 14 April 2014, the JSE re-branded to demonstrates the bourse's identity as a modern African marketplace that connects investors to growth opportunities not only in South Africa but globally.

In May 2022, the JSE became the first exchange to come to market with a new service from provider xyt that would utilize peer group rankings to help trading firms explore market share and examine and view trading interactions and performance. It would be called JSE Trade Explorer.

== Composition ==
The JSE provides a market where securities can be traded freely under a regulated procedure. It not only channels funds into the economy, but also provides investors with returns on investments in the form of dividends.

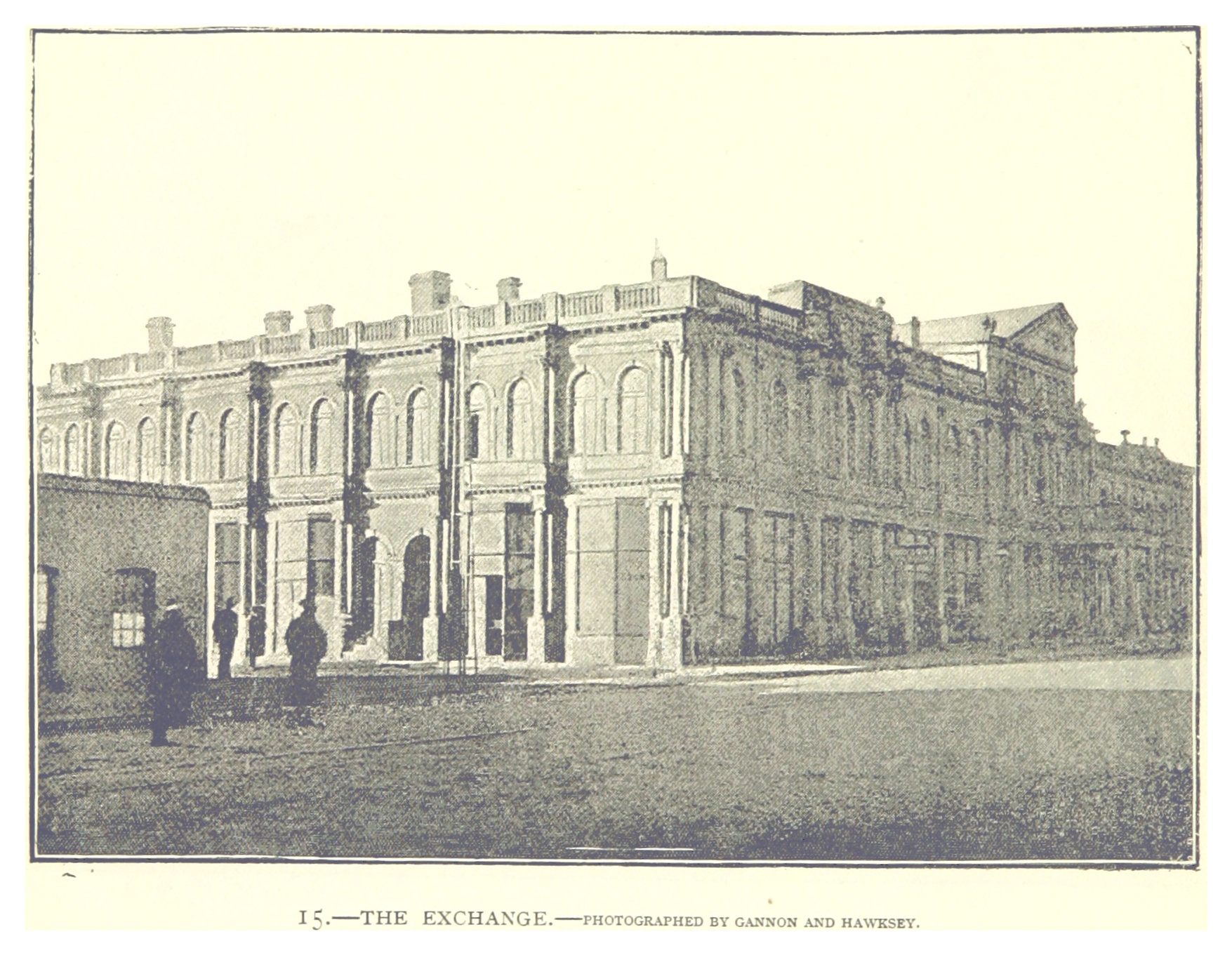
The Johannesburg Exchange in 1893

The exchange successfully fulfils its main function—the raising of primary capital—by rechannelling cash resources into productive economic activity, thus building the economy while enhancing job opportunities and wealth creation.

The exchange is directed by an honorary committee of 16 people, all with full voting rights. The elected stockbroking members, who cannot number less than eight or more than eleven, may appoint an executive president and five outside members to the committee. Policy decisions are made by the committee and carried out by a full-time executive committee headed by the executive president.

The JSE is governed by its members but through their use of JSE services and facilities, these members are also customers of the Exchange. Each year the JSE must apply to the Minister of Finance for an operating license which vests external control of the exchange in the FSB.

=== JSE Equities Trading System ===
The JSE's fully automated (electronic trading) trading system is called the Millennium Exchange, which replaced the JSE TradElect system in 2012, which in turn had replaced the JSE SETS system in April 2007, which had replaced the JSE JET system in May 2002.

The change to the Millennium Exchange involved moving the platform from London to a new platform housed in the JSE building in Johannesburg, thus speeding up the execution of transactions. The JSE operates an order-driven, central order book trading system with opening, intra-day and closing auctions.

=== Sens ===
In August 1997, the JSE launched the real-time Stock Exchange News Service (Sens) to enhance market transparency and investor confidence. Initially, it was optional for listed companies to use the service during its two-month trial period.

From 15 October, augmented JSE listing requirements oblige companies to disseminate any corporate news or price-sensitive information on the service prior to using any other media outlet. Sens is carried by all the major wire services.

=== Strate ===
Since its inception over ten years ago, Strate (Pty) Ltd has become the licensed South Africa's Central Securities Depository (CSD) for the electronic settlement of financial instruments in South Africa. Strate's stated core purpose is to mitigate risk, bring efficiencies to South African financial markets and improve its profile as an investment destination.

Strate handles the settlement of a number of securities, including equities and bonds for the Johannesburg Stock Exchange (JSE), as well as a range of derivative products such as warrants, exchange-traded funds (ETFs), retail notes and tracker funds. It has now added the settlement of money market securities to its portfolio of services. It provides services to issuers for their investors in terms of the Companies Act and Securities Services Act (SSA), 2004.

== Trading hours ==
JSE's normal trading sessions are from 9:00am to 5:00pm on all weekdays except Saturdays, Sundays and holidays declared by the exchange in advance.

In July 2025, it was reported that the exchange was considering 24-hour trading.

== Alternative Exchange ==
The Alternative Exchange is a stock exchange that was founded as a division of the JSE in order to accommodate small- and medium-sized high growth companies. Its website is accessible from the front page of the JSE's main website. The Alternative Exchange is known as AltX.

== Growth ==
In 2003 the JSE had an estimated 473 listed companies and a market capitalisation of US$182.6 billion (€158 billion), as well as an average monthly traded value of US$6.399 billion (€5.5 billion).

In March 2022, the market capitalisation of the JSE was at US$2.35 trillion.

As of July 2025, the JSE had a market capitalization of R21,73 trillion, and 435 listed companies. The FTSE/JSE All-Share Index (ALSI) hit 100,000 points in the same month - an all-time record.

As of January 2026, the JSE Limited was the most valuable African stock exchange in terms of market capitalization, by a significant margin. The JSE hosts far more large and liquid corporations than any other country on the continent. In January 2026, the exchange's market cap totaled R24,22 trillion, which was more than the total value of the next nine largest African stock exchanges combined.

With many globally-integrated companies across various economic sectors, the JSE accounts for around 60% of Africa's entire equity market value.

== Ownership ==
The bourse is operated by JSE Limited, a company that listed on its own main board in June 2006.

== Fees and taxes ==
- Securities Transfer Tax (STT) 0.25%. Applies to share purchases only, not share sales.
- Strate 0.005787% (excluding VAT) based on the value of the share transactions:
  - Minimum R10,19 for trades with a value up to R176 000.
  - Maximum R73,49 for trades with a value over R1 270 000.
- FSCA Investor Protection Levy 0.0002% (excluding VAT) on all trades.

== See also ==
- Cibecs (2009)
- Diamonds as an investment
- Gold as an investment
- Investment Analysts Society of South Africa
- South African Futures Exchange
- List of stock exchanges in the Commonwealth of Nations
- List of stock exchanges
- List of African stock exchanges
- South African Mineral Reporting Codes
- South African Institute of Stockbrokers
- South African Institute of Financial Markets
- A2X Markets
- CCP Global
