= Live at Rome Olympic Stadium =

- Original Italian cinematic poster
- Directed by: Matt Askem
- Based on: The 2nd Law World Tour by Muse
- Produced by: Muse
- Starring: Matt Bellamy; Dominic Howard; Chris Wolstenholme; Morgan Nicholls
- Music by: Muse
- Distributed by: Warner Bros., Helium 3
- Release date: 5 November 2013
- Running time: 96 minutes
- Country: United Kingdom
- Language: English

Live at Rome Olympic Stadium

Live album and Video by Muse
- Released: 29 November 2013
- Recorded: 6 July 2013
- Venue: Stadio Olimpico (Rome)
- Genres: Alternative rock; hard rock; progressive rock
- Length: 64:32 (CD); 116:56 (DVD/Blu-ray)
- Labels: Warner Bros.; Helium 3
- Producer: Muse

Muse chronology
The 2nd Law (2012)	Live at Rome Olympic Stadium (2013)	Drones (2015)

Live at Rome Olympic Stadium is a live album and video by English rock band Muse, which was released on 29 November 2013 in CD/DVD formats. On 5 November 2013, the film received theatrical screenings in 20 cities worldwide, and the next day it was screened for one night only in 40 other territories. The album contains the band's performance in Italy at Rome's Stadio Olimpico on 6 July 2013, in front of a crowd of 60,963 people. The concert was a part of The Unsustainable Tour, which is a moniker for the band's summer 2013 European leg of The 2nd Law World Tour.

== Filming and production ==
The cameras which brought the concert to screen were sixteen Sony PMW-F55 CineAlta 4K cameras, and with a variety of cinema lenses, including 5 Angenieux 24/290s, an Elite 120/520, a number of Optimo 14/52's and with Fujinon 19–90 Cabrio and 85–300 Cabrio. Furthermore, a crane, a Towercam, various hotheads and a Spidercam were used. All images were recorded in HD and 4K on three terabyte hard drives. Alongside video, 120 lines of multi-track audio were recorded, all redundant. The result of all of this was 4 sets with material, 2 main sets and 2 back-up sets.

The show was directed by Matt Askem (with whom the band worked on two previous videos, Hullabaloo: Live at Le Zenith, Paris and HAARP), and produced by Serpent Productions.

Additional songs that were performed on the night but omitted on the album were; "Map of the Problematique", "Dracula Mountain", "Liquid State", "Stockholm Syndrome", "Unintended" and "Blackout". In addition, "The 2nd Law: Isolated System" was shortened on the release.

== Release ==
The album was released on 29 November 2013 in the CD/DVD and CD/Blu-ray formats.

The 4K format was screened in theatres in 20 cities worldwide on 5 November 2013, and in 40 other territories the next day. The film was screened in the US and Canada on 6 November 2013, in Europe, UK, Australia and Japan on 7 November 2013, on 12 November 2013 in Austria, Germany, Italy and Spain, 19 November 2013 in Poland, and 22–24 November 2013 in Indonesia.

== Track listing ==
All tracks are written by Matt Bellamy, except where noted.

CD
No.	Title	Writer(s)	Length
1.	"Supremacy"		5:14
2.	"Panic Station"		3:12
3.	"Resistance"		5:32
4.	"Hysteria"	Bellamy; Dominic Howard; Chris Wolstenholme	5:06
5.	"Animals"		4:21
6.	"Knights of Cydonia"		8:19
7.	"Explorers"		5:54
8.	"Follow Me"		3:52
9.	"Madness"		4:37
10.	"Guiding Light"		4:18
11.	"Supermassive Black Hole"		4:05
12.	"Uprising"		5:35
13.	"Starlight"		4:27
Total length:			64:32

DVD / Blu-ray / 4K
No.	Title	Writer(s)	Length
1.	"Intro"		1:11
2.	"Supremacy"		5:21
3.	"Panic Station"		3:17
4.	"Plug in Baby"		4:27
5.	"Resistance"		5:35
6.	"Animals"		4:33
7.	"Knights of Cydonia"		8:58
8.	"Explorers"		5:54
9.	"Hysteria"	Bellamy; Howard; Wolstenholme	5:21
10.	"Feeling Good"	Leslie Bricusse; Anthony Newley	3:44
11.	"Follow Me"		4:02
12.	"Madness"		4:48
13.	"Time Is Running Out"	Bellamy; Howard; Wolstenholme	4:40
14.	"Guiding Light"		4:26
15.	"Undisclosed Desires"		4:10
16.	"Supermassive Black Hole"		4:15
17.	"Survival"		4:49
18.	"The 2nd Law: Isolated System"		2:26
19.	"Uprising"		5:43
20.	"Starlight"		5:10
21.	"Closing credits" ("The 2nd Law: Unsustainable")		2:44
Total length:			95:45

Extras
No.	Title	Writer(s)	Length
1.	"Stockholm Syndrome" (Las Vegas)	Bellamy; Howard; Wolstenholme	8:36
2.	"The 2nd Law: Unsustainable" (Las Vegas)		4:25
3.	"Liquid State" (Dallas)	Wolstenholme	3:23
4.	"The Road" (The Film)		4:47
Total length:			21:11

Notes

- "Hysteria" is preceded by "Interlude" from Absolution (2003).
- "Knights of Cydonia" is preceded by "Man with a Harmonica", written by Ennio Morricone, and used as an intro.

== Credits ==
Muse

- Matt Bellamy – lead vocals, guitars, piano, production, mixing
- Chris Wolstenholme – bass, backing vocals, rhythm guitar, harmonica on "Knights of Cydonia", lead vocals on "Liquid State", production, mixing
- Dominic Howard – drums, electronic drums, backing vocals on "Supermassive Black Hole", production, mixing

Additional musicians

- Morgan Nicholls – keyboards, synthesizers, backing vocals, cabasa on "Supermassive Black Hole", other assorted percussion, electronics, guitar on "Madness" and "Starlight"

Additional personnel

- Chris Lord-Alge – mixing
- Chris Vaughan – Production Manager
- Tommaso Colliva – recording
- Matt Askem – directing
- Tim Woolcott – editing
- Thomas Kirk – screen visuals
- Ted Jensen – mastering
- Hans-Peter Van Velthoven – artwork, photography

== Charts and certifications ==
=== Weekly charts ===
Chart (2013)	Peak position
Austrian Albums (Ö3 Austria)	61
Belgian Albums (Ultratop Flanders)	12
Belgian Albums (Ultratop Wallonia)	9
Croatian International Albums (HDU)	16
Dutch Albums (Album Top 100)	7
Finnish Albums (Suomen virallinen lista)	34
French Albums (SNEP)	5
German Albums (Offizielle Top 100)	26
Hungarian Albums (MAHASZ)	31
Irish Albums (IRMA)	81
Italian Albums (FIMI)	8
Norwegian Albums (VG-lista)	26
Japanese Albums (Oricon)	36
Mexican Albums (AMPROFON)	6
Portuguese Albums (AFP)	7
Scottish Albums (Official Charts)	38
Spanish Albums (Promusicae)	22
Swiss Albums (Schweizer Hitparade)	14
UK Albums (Official Charts)	36
UK Rock & Metal Albums (Official Charts)	1
US Billboard 200	115
US Top Alternative Albums (Billboard)	14
US Top Rock Albums (Billboard)	23
US Indie Store Album Sales (Billboard)	15

=== Year-end charts ===
Chart (2013)	Position
Belgian Albums (Ultratop Flanders)	169
Belgian Albums (Ultratop Wallonia)	114
Dutch Albums (Album Top 100)	79
French Albums (SNEP)	52
Hungarian Albums (MAHASZ)	98
Italian Albums (FIMI)	83

Chart (2014)	Position
Belgian Albums (Ultratop Flanders)	148
Belgian Albums (Ultratop Wallonia)	78
French Albums (SNEP)	141

=== Certifications ===
Region	Certification	Certified units/sales
France (SNEP)	Platinum	100,000^{*}
Italy (FIMI)	Gold	25,000^{*}
Portugal (AFP)	Gold	7,500^{^}
^{*} Sales figures based on certification alone.^{^} Shipments figures based on certification alone.

== Release history ==
Country	Date	Format	Label
Australia	29 November 2013	CD+DVD, CD+Blu-ray	Warner Music
Germany	29 November 2013	CD+DVD, CD+Blu-ray	Warner Music
Switzerland	29 November 2013	CD+DVD, CD+Blu-ray	Warner Music
Poland	2 December 2013	CD+DVD, CD+Blu-ray	Warner Music
United Kingdom	2 December 2013	CD+DVD, CD+Blu-ray	Helium 3
Canada	3 December 2013	CD+DVD, CD+Blu-ray	Warner Bros.
Italy	3 December 2013	CD+DVD, CD+Blu-ray	Warner Music
United States	3 December 2013	CD+DVD, CD+Blu-ray	Warner Bros.
Japan	4 December 2013	CD+DVD	Warner Music
Japan	11 December 2013	CD+Blu-ray	Warner Music
