= List of awards and nominations received by Muse =

Muse awards and nominations
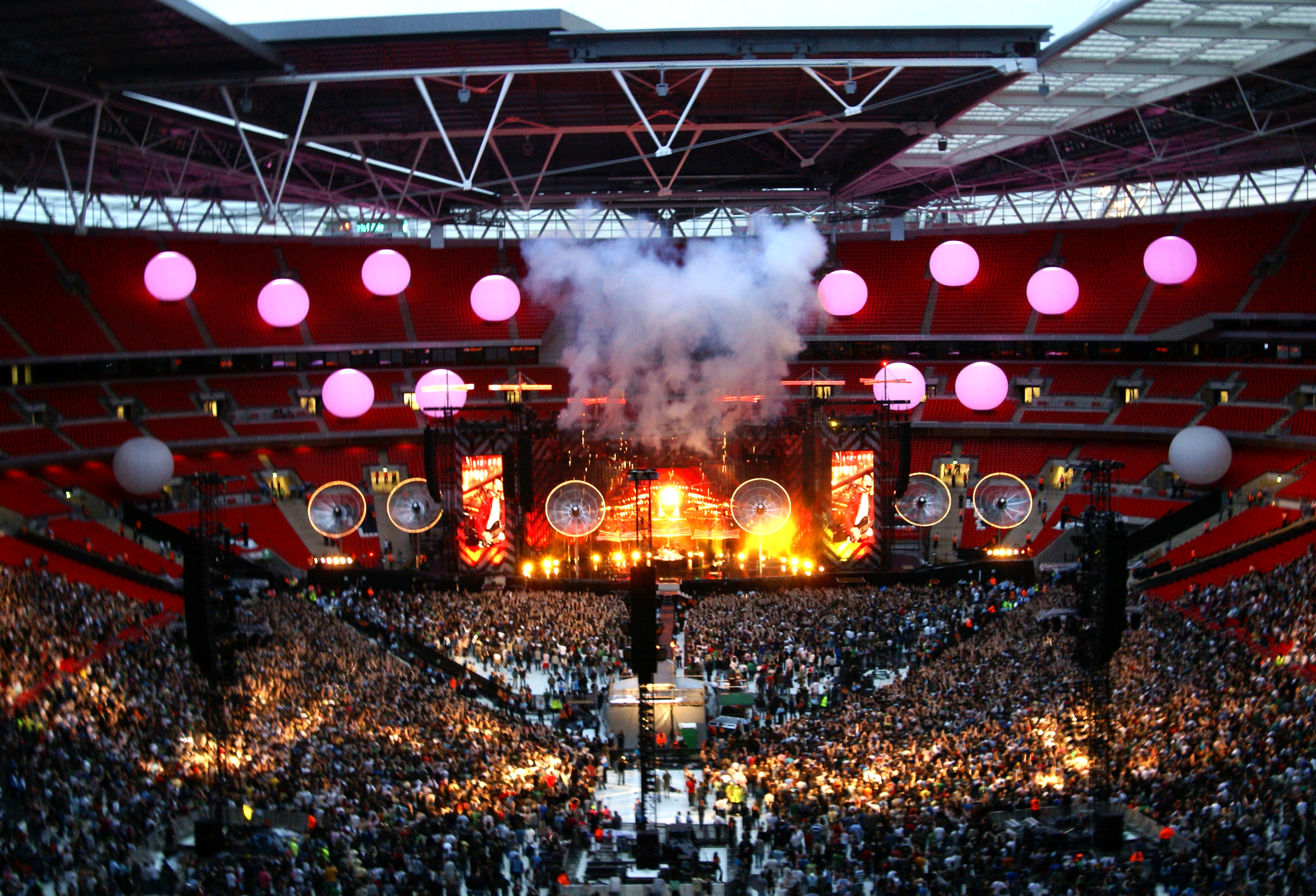
- Muse performing at Wembley Stadium, London in June 2007
Awards and nominations
Award	Wins	Nominations
Billboard	0	2
Brit	2	12
Grammy	2	9
Kerrang!	4	11
Mercury Prize	0	1
Meteor Music	1	3
MTV Asia	1	1
MTV Europe	7	18
NME	19	49
Q	7	27
American Music Awards	1	1
European Festival Awards	2	2
MTV Video Music Awards	1	3
MTV Video Music Awards Japan	3	3
mtvU Woodie Awards	1	3
Ivor Novello Awards	1	1
NRJ Music Awards	1	2
People Choice Awards	0	1
UK Festival Awards	1	3
Best Art Vinyl Award	1	2
AltRock Awards	1	2
Music Video Production Awards	4	8
O2 Silver Clef Awards	1	1
GAFFA Awards	7	10
ZD Awards	1	2
Touring Milestone Award	1	1

Totals (Note: Certain award groups do not simply award one winner. They acknowledge several different recipients, have runners-up, and have third place. Since this is a specific recognition and is different from losing an award, runner-up mentions are considered wins in this award tally. For simplification and to avoid errors, each award in this list has been presumed to have had a prior nomination.)
- Wins: 70
- Nominations: 177

Muse are an English rock band formed in Teignmouth, Devon by Matt Bellamy (lead vocals, guitars, piano), Chris Wolstenholme (bass, backing vocals) and Dominic Howard (drums, percussion). The band have released ten studio albums: Showbiz (1999), Origin of Symmetry (2001), Absolution (2003), Black Holes and Revelations (2006), The Resistance (2009), The 2nd Law (2012), Drones (2015), Simulation Theory (2018), Will of the People (2022), and The Wow! Signal (2026). "Supermassive Black Hole", the first single from the band's fourth album Black Holes and Revelations, is Muse's highest-charting single, peaking at #4 on the UK Singles Chart and #6 on Billboard's Hot Modern Rock Tracks. The band's fourth studio album, Black Holes and Revelations, has been their highest-selling album, with over three and a half million copies sold worldwide.

Muse have been nominated twelve times at the BRIT Awards, receiving two awards; both were for "Best Live Act", in 2005 and 2007. The band received seven awards at the MTV Europe Music Awards, winning both "Best Alternative Act" (in 2004 & 2006) and "Best UK & Irish Act" (in 2004 & 2007). The album Black Holes and Revelations received numerous nominations, including a Mercury Music Prize, "Best Album" from both the MTV Europe Video Awards and the NME Awards. At the Kerrang! Awards, Muse have been nominated for the "Best British Band" award five times, from 2001 to 2004, and again in 2007, but only winning it in 2001. The NME Awards have recognised Muse by awarding them the "Best Live Band" award in 2005, 2008 and 2009; the "Best British Band" award in 2007, 2010 and 2011 and the "Best New Band" award in 2000. The Q Awards have also recognised Muse as outstanding live performers; the band were nominated for the "Best Live Act" award eight times, winning it three times in 2004, 2006, and 2007, and winning "Best Act in the World Today" in 2009, 2012, and 2016. In 2010, Muse won an MTV VMA for the first time, for Best Special Effects in a Video for "Uprising", with special effects by Humble. In 2011, they received three Grammy Award nominations, of which they won "Best Rock Album" for The Resistance, and in 2013 they received a further two nominations, for "Best Rock Album" for The 2nd Law, and "Best Rock Song" for "Madness". In 2016, they won another Grammy for "Best Rock Album" for Drones. They also received the prestigious Ivor Novello Award for the first time, for International Achievement. Overall, Muse have received 70 awards from 177 nominations.

== AltRock Awards ==
The AltRock Award is presented annually by the American radio station i99Radio. Muse have received two nominations.

Year	Nominee / work	Award	Result
2018	Muse (with Thirty Seconds to Mars and PVRIS)	Tour of the Year	Won
2018	Muse (with Thirty Seconds to Mars and PVRIS)	Best Online Performance	Nominated

== American Music Awards ==
The American Music Awards is an annual awards ceremony created by Dick Clark in 1973. Muse have received one award from one nomination.

Year	Nominee / work	Award	Result
2010	Muse	Favorite Alternative Artist	Won

== Berlin Music Video Awards ==
The Berlin Music Video Awards is an international festival that promotes the art of music videos.

Year	Nominee / work	Award	Result
2019	Pressure	Best Narrative	Nominated
2022	Compliance	Best Director	Nominated
2022	Won't Stand Down	Most Bizarre	Nominated
2023	You make me feel like it's Halloween	Best Animation	Nominated

== Best Art Vinyl Award ==
The Best Art Vinyl award has been awarded since 2005 by Art Vinyl Ltd for the best album artwork of the past year. The award is judged by public vote from a list of 50 nominations from music industry and graphic design experts. In 2009, The Resistance won the award, beating Manic Street Preachers and Fever Ray to first place. For Best Art Vinyl 2012, The 2nd Law came in second place.

Year	Nominee / work	Award	Result
2009	The Resistance	Best Vinyl Art	1st
2012	The 2nd Law	Best Vinyl Art	3rd

== Billboard Music Awards ==
The Billboard Music Awards, sponsored by Billboard magazine, is one of several annual United States music awards shows. The BMAs honour winners based on Billboard's year-end music charts, which are based on Nielsen data for sales, downloads and airplay. Muse were nominated for two awards.

Year	Nominee / work	Award	Result
2011	Muse	Best Rock Artist	Nominated
2011	Muse	Best Alternative Artist	Nominated

== Brit Awards ==
The Brit Awards are the British Phonographic Industry's annual pop music awards. Muse have received two awards from twelve nominations.

Year	Nominee / work	Award	Result
2004	Muse	British Rock Act	Nominated
2005	Muse	British Group	Nominated
2005	Muse	British Rock Act	Nominated
2005	Muse	British Live Act	Won
2005	Absolution	British Album of the Year	Nominated
2007	Muse	British Group	Nominated
2007	Muse	British Live Act	Won
2007	Black Holes and Revelations	British Album of the Year	Nominated
2008	Muse	British Live Act	Nominated
2010	Muse	British Group	Nominated
2013	Muse	British Group	Nominated
2013	Muse	British Live Act	Nominated

== European Festival Awards ==
The European Festival Awards are awarded annually, with various categories for all aspects of festivals that have taken place in Europe. Muse have received 2 awards from 2 nominations.

Year	Nominee / work	Award	Result
2010	Muse	Best Headliner	Won
2010	"Uprising"	Anthem of the Year	Won

== GAFFA Awards ==
=== GAFFA Awards (Denmark) ===
Delivered since 1991, the GAFFA Awards are a Danish award that rewards popular music by the magazine of the same name.

Year	Nominee / work	Award	Result	Ref.
2003	Muse	Foreign Live Act	Nominated	
2006	Muse	Best Foreign Band	Won	
2006	"Starlight"	Best Foreign Song	Nominated	
2006	Black Holes and Revelations	Best Foreign Album	Nominated	
2008	H.A.A.R.P.	Best Foreign DVD	Won	
2009	The Resistance	Best Foreign Album	Won	
2009	"Uprising"	Best Foreign Song	Won	
2009	Muse	Best Foreign Band	Won	
2012	Muse	Best Foreign Band	Won	
2015	Muse	Best Foreign Band	Won	

=== GAFFA Awards (Sweden) ===
Delivered since 2010, the GAFFA Awards (Swedish: GAFFA Priset) are a Swedish award that rewards popular music awarded by the magazine of the same name.

Year	Nominee / work	Award	Result	Ref.
2019	Muse	Best Foreign Band	Nominated	

== Grammy Awards ==
The Grammy Awards are an annual music awards show, presented by National Academy of Recording Arts and Sciences. Muse have received two awards from eight nominations.

Year	Nominee / work	Award	Result
2011	"Resistance"	Best Rock Performance by a Duo or Group with Vocal	Nominated
2011	"Resistance"	Best Rock Song	Nominated
2011	The Resistance	Best Rock Album	Won
2013	The 2nd Law	Best Rock Album	Nominated
2013	"Madness"	Best Rock Song	Nominated
2014	"Panic Station"	Best Rock Song	Nominated
2016	Drones	Best Rock Album	Won
2023	"Kill or Be Killed"	Best Metal Performance	Nominated
2027	The Wow! Signal	Best Rock Album	TBA

== Ivor Novello Awards ==
The Ivor Novello Awards, named after the Cardiff born entertainer Ivor Novello, are awards for songwriting and composing. They are presented annually in London by the British Academy of Songwriters, Composers and Authors (BASCA). The Ivors remain the only award ceremony in the musical calendar that is not influenced by publishers and record companies but judged and presented by the writing community.

Year	Nominee / work	Award	Result
2011	Muse	International Achievement	Won

== Kerrang! Awards ==
The Kerrang! Awards are awarded annually by British music magazine Kerrang!. Muse have received four awards from eleven nominations.

Year	Nominee / work	Award	Result
2001	Muse	Best British Band	Won
2002	Muse	Best British Live Act	Won
2002	Muse	Best British Band	Nominated
2003	Muse	Best British Band	Nominated
2004	Absolution	Best Album	Won
2004	Muse	Best British Band	Nominated
2004	Muse	Best Live Band	Nominated
2006	Muse	Best Live Act	Won
2006	"Supermassive Black Hole"	Best Single	Nominated
2007	Muse	Best Live Band	Nominated
2007	Muse	Best British Band	Nominated

== Mercury Prize ==
In 2006, Muse were nominated for the Mercury Prize for their album Black Holes and Revelations.

Year	Nominee / work	Award	Result
2006	Black Holes and Revelations	Album of the Year	Nominated

== Meteor Music Awards ==
The Meteor Music Awards are the national music awards of Ireland, established by mobile telecommunications company Meteor. Muse have received one award from three nominations.

Year	Nominee / work	Award	Result
2007	Black Holes and Revelations	Best International Album	Nominated
2007	Muse	Best International Band	Nominated
2008	Oxegen 2007	Best International Live Performance	Won

== MTV Awards ==
MTV Asia Awards

The biannual MTV Asia Awards is the Asian equivalent of the Australian MTV Australia Awards. Muse have received one award.

Year	Nominee / work	Award	Result
2008	Asia Tour 2007	Bring Da House Down	Won

MTV Europe Music Awards

The MTV Europe Music Awards is an annual awards ceremony established in 1994 by MTV Europe. Muse have received seven awards from eighteen nominations. They performed at the 2012 show.

Year	Nominee / work	Award	Result
2004	Muse	Best Alternative	Won
2004	Muse	Best UK & Ireland Act	Won
2006	Black Holes and Revelations	Best Album	Nominated
2006	Muse	Best Alternative	Won
2007	Muse	Best Headliner	Won
2007	Muse	Best UK & Ireland Act	Won
2009	Muse	Best Alternative	Nominated
2010	Muse	Best Rock	Nominated
2010	Muse	Best Live Act	Nominated
2010	Muse	Best World Stage Performance	Nominated
2012	Muse	Best Rock	Nominated
2012	Muse	Best Live Act	Nominated
2015	Muse	Best Rock	Nominated
2016	Muse	Best Rock	Nominated
2018	Muse	Best Rock	Nominated
2018	Muse	Best Live Act	Nominated
2019	Muse	Best World Stage	Won
2022	Muse	Best Rock	Won

MTV Video Music Awards

The MTV Video Music Awards is an annual awards ceremony established in 1984 by MTV. Muse have received one award from three nominations.

Year	Nominee / work	Award	Result
2010	"Uprising"	Best Special Effects	Won
2010	"Uprising"	Best Rock Video	Nominated
2022	"Won't Stand Down"	Best Rock	Nominated

MTV Video Music Awards Japan

The MTV Video Music Awards Japan is the Japanese version of the MTV Video Music Awards, established in 2002 by MTV Japan. Muse have received three awards.

Year	Nominee / work	Award	Result
2010	"Uprising"	Best Rock Video	Won
2013	"Follow Me"	Video of the Year	Won
2013	"Follow Me"	Best Rock Video	Won

mtvU Woodie Awards

The mtvU Woodie Awards are awarded annually by American music video network mtvU. Muse have received one award from three nominations.

Year	Nominee / work	Award	Result
2005	Muse	Best Live Woodie	Nominated
2005	Muse	Best International Woodie	Nominated
2007	Muse	Best Performing Woodie	Won

== Music Video Production Awards ==
The MVPA Awards are annually presented by a Los Angeles-based music trade organization to honor the year's best music videos.

Year	Nominee / work	Award	Result
2005	"Hysteria"	Best Special Effects	Won
2007	"Knights of Cydonia"	Best Director of a Band	Won
2007	"Knights of Cydonia"	Best Cinematography	Won
2007	"Knights of Cydonia"	Best Hair	Nominated
2008	"Invincible"	Best Computer Effects	Won
2008	"Invincible"	Best Animated Video	Nominated
2008	"Invincible"	Best Special Effects	Nominated
2013	"Madness"	Best Editing	Nominated

== NME Awards ==
The NME Awards are an annual music awards show, founded by the music magazine NME. Muse have received 19 awards from 49 nominations.

Year	Nominee / work	Award	Result
2000	Muse	Best New Band	Won
2002	Origin of Symmetry	Best Album	Nominated
2002	Muse	Best Live Act	Nominated
2005	Muse	Best Live Band	Won
2007	"Supermassive Black Hole"	Best Track	Nominated
2007	Black Holes and Revelations	Best Album	Nominated
2007	Muse	Best Live Band	Nominated
2007	Muse	Best British Band	Won
2007	Matt Bellamy	Sexiest Male	Won
2008	Matt Bellamy	Sexiest Male	Nominated
2008	Wembley Stadium 2007	Best Live Event	Nominated
2008	Muse	Best Live Band	Won
2008	Muse	Best British Band	Nominated
2009	Muse	Best British Band	Nominated
2009	Muse	Best Live Band	Won
2009	HAARP	Best DVD	Nominated
2009	HAARP	Best Album Artwork	Won
2009	Matt Bellamy	Sexiest Male	Won
2010	Muse	Best British Band	Won
2010	Muse	Best Live Band	Nominated
2010	The Resistance	Best Album	Nominated
2010	The Resistance	Best Album Artwork	Nominated
2010	muse.mu and twitter.com/muse	Best Band Blog	Nominated
2010	muse.mu	Best Website	Won
2010	A Seaside Rendezvous	Best Live Event	Nominated
2010	"Plug In Baby"	Best Guitar Riff	Won
2010	Matt Bellamy	Worst Dressed	Nominated
2010	Matt Bellamy	Hero of the Year	Nominated
2010	Matt Bellamy	Hottest Male	Won
2010	Dominic Howard	Hottest Male	Nominated
2011	Muse	Best British Band	Won
2011	Muse	Best Live Band	Nominated
2011	Matt Bellamy	Hero of the Year	Nominated
2011	Matt Bellamy	Hottest Male	Won
2011	Dominic Howard	Hottest Male	Nominated
2012	Muse	Best British Band	Nominated
2012	Muse	Best Live Band	Nominated
2012	Muse	Most Dedicated Fans	Won
2012	Muse	Worst Band	Nominated
2012	Matt Bellamy	Hero of the Year	Nominated
2012	Matt Bellamy	Hottest Male	Nominated
2012	Dominic Howard	Hottest Male	Nominated
2013	Muse	Best Fan Community	Won
2013	Muse	Best Twitter	Nominated
2014	Muse	Worst Band	Nominated
2014	Muse	Best Fan Community	Nominated
2015	Muse	Best Fan Community	Won
2018	Muse	Best Festival Headliner	Won
2020	Muse	Best Reissue	Won

== NRJ Music Awards ==
The NRJ Music Awards, created in 2000 by the radio station NRJ in partnership with the television network TF1, takes place every year in mid-January at Cannes. They give out awards to popular musicians in different categories. Muse have received one award from two nomination.

Year	Nominee / work	Award	Result
2011	Muse	International Group/Duo of the Year	Nominated
2018	Muse	NRJ Award of Honor	Won

== Silver Clef Awards ==
The Silver Clef Award is an annual UK music awards lunch which has been running since 1976. Muse received one award from one nomination.

Year	Nominee / work	Award	Result
2010	Muse	Nordorff Robbins O2 Silver Clef Award	Won

== Peoples Choice Awards ==
The People's Choice Awards is an annual awards ceremony from CBS to honor pop culture. Muse received one nomination

Year	Nominee / work	Award	Result
2014	Muse	Favorite Alternative Band	Nominated

== Q Awards ==
The Q Awards are the UK's annual music awards run by music magazine Q. Muse have received seven awards from 27 nominations.

Year	Nominee / work	Award	Result
2000	Showbiz	Best Album	Nominated
2000	Muse	Best New Act	Nominated
2001	Origin of Symmetry	Best Album	Nominated
2001	Muse	Best Live Act	Nominated
2002	Muse	Best Live Act	Nominated
2003	"Time Is Running Out"	Best Single	Nominated
2003	"Time Is Running Out"	Best Video	Nominated
2003	Muse	Innovation in Sound	Won
2004	Muse	Best Live Act	Won
2004	Muse	Best Act in the World Today	Nominated
2006	Muse	Best Live Act	Won
2006	Muse	Best Act in the World Today	Nominated
2006	Black Holes and Revelations	Best Album	Nominated
2007	"Knights of Cydonia"	Best Track	Nominated
2007	Muse	Best Live Act	Won
2007	Muse	Best Act in the World Today	Nominated
2008	Muse	Best Act in the World Today	Nominated
2009	Muse	Best Act in the World Today	Won
2009	"Uprising"	Best Track	Nominated
2010	Muse	Best Act in the World Today	Nominated
2010	Muse	Best Live Act	Nominated
2012	Muse	Best Act in the World Today	Won
2013	Muse	Best Live Act	Nominated
2015	Muse	Best Act in the World Today	Nominated
2015	"Psycho"	Best Video	Nominated
2016	Muse	Best Act in the World Today	Won
2016	Muse	Best Live Act	Nominated

== UK Festival Awards ==
The UK Festival Awards are awarded annually, with various categories for all aspects of festivals that have taken place in the UK, and one category for European festivals. Muse have received 1 award from 3 nominations.

Year	Nominee / work	Award	Result
2008	Muse	Best Headline Act	Nominated
2010	Glastonbury and T in the Park	Best Headline Performance	Nominated
2010	"Uprising"	Anthem of the Year	Won

== Ticketmaster Touring Milestone Award ==
An annual honor for musicians who headlined the biggest tours, rocked the largest stage and reached the most fans around the world. To qualify for a Ticketmaster Touring Milestone Award (TTMA), an artist must have sold at least one million tickets globally for a tour. Muse have received 1 award from 1 nominations.

Year	Nominee / work	Award	Result
2019	The Simulation Theory World Tour	Touring Milestone Award	Won

== ZD Awards ==
Zvukovaya Dorozhka (Russian: Звуковая Дорожка, "sound track") is Russia's oldest hit parade in field of popular music. Since 2003 it is presented in a ceremony in concert halls. It's considered one of the major Russian music awards.

Year	Nominee / work	Award	Result	Ref.
2015	Themselves	Best Foreign Act	Won	
2015	Drones World Tour (live at Park Live Festival)	Tour of the Year	Nominated	
