= H.A.A.R.P. =

H.A.A.R.P. may refer to:

- High Frequency Active Auroral Research Program, an investigation project to understand, simulate and control ionospheric processes
- HAARP, a live album by English rock band Muse, named after the investigation
