= The Tourist (soundtrack) =

The Tourist (Original Motion Picture Soundtrack)

Soundtrack album by James Newton Howard
- Released: December 21, 2010
- Recorded: 2010
- Studio: Sony Scoring Stage, Sony Pictures Studios, Culver City, California; James Newton Howard Studios, Santa Monica, California
- Genre: Film score
- Length: 70:59
- Label: Varèse Sarabande
- Producer: James Newton Howard

James Newton Howard chronology
Love & Other Drugs (2010)	The Tourist (2010)	The Green Hornet (2011)

The Tourist (Original Motion Picture Soundtrack) is the soundtrack album composed by James Newton Howard to the 2010 film The Tourist directed by Florian Henckel von Donnersmarck and starring Johnny Depp and Angelina Jolie. The album featured 21 tracks of Howard's score, with three songs performed by Gabriel Yared, Muse and Katie Melua was released on December 21, 2010, through the Varèse Sarabande label.

== Background ==
The film score was initially set to be composed by Gabriel Yared, a friend of von Donnersmarck. Yared went on a four-month tour to Venice in order to know Depp and Jolie before creating a dance track. However, during the middle of the film's production, he was replaced by James Newton Howard. Yared had composed one musical piece "Dance in F" for the film. Howard pictured Venice as the inspiration for the film's musical palette and crafted a score that supplemented the storyline. The film also features, "Starlight" by the band Muse and "No Fear of Heights" by Katie Melua.

== Reception ==
James Christopher Monger of AllMusic noted that Howard's score for The Tourist "strikes a nice balance between electronic-driven, modern heist cues and more traditional, James Bond-inspired espionage themes." Filmtracks wrote "Interestingly, the fluffy tone of The Tourist is in part perpetuated by Howard's choice to mix the orchestral elements far in front of the synthetic ones, another reason this score really sounds little like Salt [...] The album presentation is generous with Howard's material, including over an hour of it (perhaps unnecessarily). But the bonus of the album is hearing one retained cue from Yared's score at the end, a dance saturated with the same European sensibilities that Howard clearly emulated. In the end, one has to wonder if Yared's entire score would have worked just as well, if not better." Thomas Glorieux of Maintitles wrote "Either way The Tourist is an acceptable spy score and at times charming romantic score. And in my mind it is clear that the romantic music does outshine the suspenseful material, and this due to a most lovely romantic theme. So I guess most of you will want to stay to that side of the soundtrack."

Daniel Schweiger of AssignmentX wrote "From fun start to finish on our trip down the dangerously romantic byways of Venice, there's no denying the old-school charm that The Tourist's score has in spades, music that plays the glamorous stuff that stars like Jolie are made of." "This isn't a great album by any means, but it's very enjoyable; probably Howard's most enjoyable non-Shyamalan album in a long time." Tom Lynch of Newcity wrote "James Newton Howard's mawkish score lacks the retro wit seen in the eyewear, costumes and decor."

Justin Chang of Variety called it "an alternately jittery and swoony concoction by James Newton Howard". Matt Soergel of The Florida Times-Union wrote "James Newton Howard's score is sprightly and pleasingly retro." Mick LaSalle of SFGate called it a "mellow soundtrack". Christy Lemire of The Repository wrote "the score from James Newton Howard tends to play up the madcap hilarity, and the would-be romance, a bit too intrusively".

== Track listing ==
No.	Title	Writer(s)	Length
1.	"Tracking Elise"	James Newton Howard	1:29
2.	"Burned Letter"	James Newton Howard	2:21
3.	"Paranoid Math Teacher"	James Newton Howard	3:31
4.	"Arrival At Venice"	James Newton Howard	3:06
5.	"Elise Offers A Ride"	James Newton Howard	1:52
6.	"A Very Nice Kiss"	James Newton Howard	2:04
7.	"Bedroom Dreams"	James Newton Howard	2:58
8.	"Piecing It Together"	James Newton Howard	3:11
9.	"Rooftop Run"	James Newton Howard	5:18
10.	"Chase Through The Canals"	James Newton Howard	5:45
11.	"Because I Kissed You"	James Newton Howard	3:34
12.	"A Very Nice Hotel"	James Newton Howard	2:27
13.	"Arriving At The Ball"	James Newton Howard	2:04
14.	"Your Choice In Men"	James Newton Howard	2:04
15.	"Sudden Departure"	James Newton Howard	2:03
16.	"The Infinite Price"	James Newton Howard	7:30
17.	"The Janus Safe"	James Newton Howard	3:01
18.	"Rain Of Bullets"	James Newton Howard	1:29
19.	"Aftermath"	James Newton Howard	0:52
20.	"Elise & Alexander"	James Newton Howard	2:41
21.	"Personal Cheque"	James Newton Howard	1:57
22.	"Dance In F"	Gabriel Yared	2:42
23.	"Starlight"	Muse	4:06
24.	"No Fear of Heights"	Katie Melua	2:59

== Personnel ==
Credits adapted from liner notes:

- Music composer and producer – James Newton Howard
- Co-producer – Stuart Michael Thomas
- Sound engineer – Matt Ward
- Sound designer and programmer – Mel Wesson, Ryeland Allison
- Score recordist – Adam Michalak
- Recording – Shawn Murphy
- Mixing – Joel Iwataki
- Mastering – Patricia Sullivan Fourstar
- Music editor – Joe E. Rand
- Assistant music editor – Barbara McDermott
- Auricle control systems operator – Richard Grant
- Pro-tools operator – Erik Swanson
- Technical score advisor – Sven Faulconer
- Executive producer – Robert Townson
- Music coordinator – Pamela Sollie
- Music preparation – JoAnn Kane Music Service, Mark Graham
- Scoring crew – David Marquette, Greg Loskorn, Mark Eshelman
- Liner notes – Florian Henckel von Donnersmarck
- Executive in charge of music for Columbia Pictures – Lia Vollack

Orchestra

- Orchestra – Hollywood Studio Symphony
- Orchestrators – Conrad Pope, James Newton Howard, Jeff Atmajian, John Ashton Thomas, Jon Kull, Pete Anthony
- Conductor – Pete Anthony
- Contractor – Peter Rotter, Sandy de Crescent
- Leader – Roger Wilkie

Instruments

- Accordion – Frank Marocco
- Bass – Bruce Morgenthaler, Drew Dembowski, Edward Meares, Michael Valerio, Nico Abondolo, Oscar Hidalgo
- Bassoon – Kenneth Munday, Michael O'Donovan
- Cello – Andrew Shulman, Antony Cooke, Armen Ksajikian, Cecilia Tsan, Christina Soule, David Speltz, Dennis Karmazyn, Erika Duke-Kirkpatrick, John Walz, Paula Hochhalter, Timothy Landauer, Trevor Handy
- Clarinet – Benjamin Lulich, Stuart Clark
- Flute – Geraldine Rotella, Heather Clark, Jenni Olson
- Harp – Gayle Levant, Marcia Dickstein
- Horn – Daniel Kelley, David Everson, David Duke, James Thatcher, Mark Adams, Phillip Yao, Steve Becknell
- Oboe – Barbara Northcutt, Tom Boyd
- Percussion – Alan Estes, Robert Zimmitti, Peter Limonick
- Piano, celesta – Randy Kerber
- Trombone – Andy Malloy, Bill Reichenbach, George Thatcher, Bill Booth
- Trumpet – David Washburn, Jon Lewis, Malcolm McNab
- Tuba – Jim Self
- Viola – Alma Fernandez, Andrew Duckles, Brian Dembow, Darrin McCann, David Walther, Keith Greene, Matthew Funes, Mike Nowak, Rob Brophy, Roland Kato, Shawn Mann, Steven Gordon, Thomas Diener, Vickie Miskolczy
- Violin – Alan Grunfeld, Alyssa Park, Ana Landauer, Bruce Dukov, Darius Campo, Dimitrie Leivici, Elizabeth Johnson, Endre Granat, Eun-Mee Ahn, Haim Shtrum, Jackie Brand, Jay Rosen, Jeanne Skrocki, Jessica Guideri, Josefina Vergara, Julie Ann Gigante, Katia Popov, Kenneth Yerke, Kevin Connolly, Marc Sazer, Miwako Watanabe, Natalie Leggett, Nina Evtuhov, Phillip Levy, Roberto Cani, Roger Wilkie, Sara Parkins, Sarah Thornblade, Searmi Park, Serena McKinney, Tammy Hatwan, Tereza Stanislav

== Accolades ==
Awards
Ceremony	Award	Category	Name	Outcome
2011 ASCAP Awards	ASCAP Film and Television Music Awards	Top Box Office Films	James Newton Howard	Won
