= HAARP (album) =

2008 live album and video by Muse

Live album and Video by Muse
- Released: 17 March 2008
- Recorded: 16 June 2007 (CD); 17 June 2007 (DVD)
- Venue: Wembley Stadium (London)
- Genres: Alternative rock; hard rock; progressive rock
- Length: 71:48 (CD); 99:23 (DVD)
- Labels: Warner Bros.; Helium-3
- Producer: Muse

Muse chronology
Black Holes and Revelations (2006)	HAARP (2008)	The Resistance (2009)

HAARP is a live album and video by English rock band Muse, released on 17 March 2008 in the United Kingdom and 1 April 2008 in the United States. The CD documents the band's performance at London's Wembley Stadium, as part of their Black Holes and Revelations Tour, on 16 June 2007, while the DVD contains 20 tracks from the performance on 17 June. The total number of audiences watching the band's shows on 16 and 17 June 2007 was 180,000 (150,000 seated and 30,000 standing). It was named the 40th greatest live album of all time by NME in 2010.

== Set design ==
For their performances at Wembley, Muse had the stadium decked out with massive props to dress it as the Ionospheric Research Instrument of the High Frequency Active Auroral Research Program (HAARP), a US government-funded ionospheric research program in Gakona, Alaska which uses high frequency radio waves to cause changes in the ionosphere. and stated in a 2006 interview "Some people think it's designed to tap into the ionosphere to control the weather. Others think it's there to diffuse UFO beams, or to send out microwaves to control our thoughts". In 2008 they explained to Virgin Radio "All these sort of antennas, cables, screens and stuff are based on the same sort of layout as the HAARP layout".

== Release and promotion ==
Professional ratings
Review scores
Source	Rating
AbsolutePunk.net	90%
AllMusic	3.5/5 stars
Melodic	5/5 stars
NME	8/10
Pitchfork	6.5/10
Q	5/5 stars

In the build-up to the release of the recordings, the band released a number of web-format clips from the DVD. The full performance of "Unintended" was added to the band's official website on Christmas Eve, 24 December 2007, dubbed as a "little taste of things to come". On 11 January 2008, a microsite at www.he-3.mu was announced, featuring a grid of six boxes representing thumbnails of short clips from the DVD. By 17 March, all six clips were filled, featuring short clips from "Knights of Cydonia", "Supermassive Black Hole", "Feeling Good", "New Born", "Blackout" and the outro riffs of "Stockholm Syndrome". "Feeling Good" was also released in full to radio and television stations shortly afterwards, although it was not advertised on the official website. Vue cinemas held special screenings of the concert in high definition on 11 March 2008 at select cinemas.

A special edition of HAARP was released in addition to the regular CD/DVD, which features additional backstage footage and bonus postcards showing pictures of the three band members. The HAARP microsite is available for visitors to download iPod- and iPod Touch-/iPhone-formatted videos and mp3s of "Knights of Cydonia", "Supermassive Black Hole", "Unintended" and "Plug in Baby" featured on the DVD for free. Included is a bonus video of "Micro Cuts" and an mp3 of "Soldier's Poem" from the performance on 16 June.

== Track listing ==
All songs written and composed by Matt Bellamy, except where otherwise noted.

CD (HEL3007CD)
No.	Title	Writer(s)	Length
1.	"Intro" ("Dance of the Knights")	Sergei Prokofiev	1:44
2.	"Knights of Cydonia"		6:37
3.	"Hysteria"	Bellamy, Dominic Howard, Chris Wolstenholme	4:19
4.	"Supermassive Black Hole"		4:01
5.	"Map of the Problematique"		5:22
6.	"Butterflies and Hurricanes"	Bellamy, Howard, Wolstenholme	5:56
7.	"Invincible"		6:15
8.	"Starlight"		4:13
9.	"Time Is Running Out"	Bellamy, Howard, Wolstenholme	4:23
10.	"New Born"		8:16
11.	"Unintended"		4:36
12.	"Micro Cuts"		3:47
13.	"Stockholm Syndrome"	Bellamy, Howard, Wolstenholme	7:37
14.	"Take a Bow"		4:42
Total length:			71:48

iTunes edition
No.	Title	Length
15.	"City of Delusion"	5:08
Total length:		76:56

DVD (HEL3007DVD)
No.	Title	Writer(s)	Length
1.	"Intro"		1:50
2.	"Knights of Cydonia"		6:29
3.	"Hysteria"	Bellamy, Howard, Wolstenholme	4:11
4.	"Supermassive Black Hole"		4:12
5.	"Map of the Problematique"		5:08
6.	"Butterflies and Hurricanes"	Bellamy, Howard, Wolstenholme	6:13
7.	"Hoodoo"		3:32
8.	"Apocalypse Please"	Bellamy, Howard, Wolstenholme	4:45
9.	"Feeling Good"	Leslie Bricusse, Anthony Newley	3:46
10.	"Invincible"		5:49
11.	"Starlight"		4:14
12.	"Improv."		0:52
13.	"Time Is Running Out"	Bellamy, Howard, Wolstenholme	4:30
14.	"New Born"		9:16
15.	"Soldier's Poem"		2:19
16.	"Unintended"		4:42
17.	"Blackout"	Bellamy, Howard, Wolstenholme	5:02
18.	"Plug in Baby"		4:27
19.	"Stockholm Syndrome"	Bellamy, Howard, Wolstenholme	8:06
20.	"Take a Bow"		5:24
21.	"Closing credits" ("Blackout" instrumental)	Bellamy, Howard, Wolstenholme	4:36
Total length:			99:23

Notes

1. "Knights of Cydonia" incorporates elements of "Close Encounters of the Third Kind", written by John Williams
2. "Map of the Problematique" incorporates elements of "Maggie's Farm" as performed by Rage Against the Machine, originally written and performed by Bob Dylan
3. "New Born" incorporates elements of "Microphone Fiend" as performed by Rage Against the Machine, originally written and performed by Eric B. & Rakim and containing elements of "School Boy Crush", written by Hamish Stuart, Steve Ferrone, Alan Gorrie, Roger Ball, Molly Duncan and Onnie McIntyre and originally performed by the Average White Band
4. "Stockholm Syndrome" incorporates elements of "Township Rebellion" originally written and performed by Rage Against the Machine and "Endless, Nameless" written and performed by Nirvana, as well as a rudimentary version of the main riff of their future song "Psycho"

5. An easter egg features on the DVD. If the 'Gallery' screen is displayed, the left button on the remote control can be clicked to highlight Dominic Howard's trousers. If the enter button is pressed whilst the trousers are highlighted, a screen will come up advertising the band's website.

== Personnel ==
Muse

- Matt Bellamy – lead vocals, guitar, piano, production, mixing
- Chris Wolstenholme – bass, backing vocals, guitar on "Hoodoo", production, mixing
- Dominic Howard – drums, electronic drums and backing vocals on "Supermassive Black Hole", synthesiser on "Take a Bow", production, mixing

Additional musicians

- Morgan Nicholls – keyboards, synthesisers, backing vocals, cabasa on "Supermassive Black Hole", bass on "Hoodoo", glockenspiel on "Soldier's Poem"
- Dan Newell – trumpet on "Knights of Cydonia" and "City of Delusion"

Additional personnel

- Rich Costey – mixing
- Thomas Kirk – directing, editing, screen visuals
- Tommaso Colliva – assistant mixing
- Justin Gerrish – assistant mixing
- Vlado Meller – mastering
- Mark Santangelo – assistant mastering
- Ben Curzon – artwork
- Hans-Peter Van Velthoven – photography

== Charts and certifications ==
=== Weekly charts ===
Chart (2008)	Peak position
Austrian Albums (Ö3 Austria)	21
Belgian Albums (Ultratop Flanders)	3
Belgian Albums (Ultratop Wallonia)	4
Danish Albums (Hitlisten)	12
Dutch Albums (Album Top 100)	4
Finnish Albums (Suomen virallinen lista)	9
French Albums (SNEP)	3
German Albums (Offizielle Top 100)	27
Irish Albums (IRMA)	5
Italian Albums (FIMI)	5
New Zealand Albums (RMNZ)	2
Norwegian Albums (VG-lista)	2
Portuguese Albums (AFP)	10
Scottish Albums (Official Charts)	2
Spanish Albums (Promusicae)	24
Swedish Albums (Sverigetopplistan)	36
Swiss Albums (Schweizer Hitparade)	6
UK Albums (Official Charts)	2
US Billboard 200	46
US Top Alternative Albums (Billboard)	14
US Top Rock Albums (Billboard)	16

=== Year-end charts ===
Chart (2008)	Position
Belgian Albums (Ultratop Flanders)	85
Belgian Albums (Ultratop Wallonia)	50
French Albums (SNEP)	70
UK Albums (OCC)	161

=== Certifications ===
Region	Certification	Certified units/sales
Mexico (AMPROFON)	Gold	10,000^{^}
Norway (IFPI Norway)	Gold	15,000^{*}
United Kingdom (BPI)	Gold	25,000^{*}
United States (RIAA)	Gold	50,000^{^}
^{*} Sales figures based on certification alone.^{^} Shipments figures based on certification alone.
