= Follow Me (Muse song) =

Single by Muse

from the album The 2nd Law
- Released: 7 December 2012
- Recorded: October 2011 – July 2012
- Studio: Shangri La Studios (Malibu, California) and Air Studios (London, England)
- Genre: Electronic rock; dubstep; pop rock
- Length: 3:51
- Label: Warner Bros.; Helium-3
- Songwriter: Matt Bellamy
- Producers: Muse; Nero

Muse singles chronology
"Madness" (2012)	"Follow Me" (2012)	"Supremacy" (2013)

Music video
- "Follow Me" on YouTube "Follow Me" (Lyric Video) on YouTube

"Follow Me" is a song by the English rock band Muse, written and Matt Bellamy for their sixth studio album, The 2nd Law. It appears as the sixth track on the album. The song was released as the third single from The 2nd Law on 7 December 2012, just over two months after the album was released.

== Composition ==
"Follow Me", which is co-produced by Nero, contains influences from dubstep, like the early promotional, "The 2nd Law: Unsustainable". The song also shares instrumental elements from Muse's previous two studio albums, Black Holes and Revelations and concept album The Resistance, both of which were electronically inspired, like The 2nd Law. The beginning of the track features Bellamy's newborn son Bingham's heartbeat, recorded on Bellamy's iPhone. According to Bellamy, the song is about "having a baby and all that." This was later confirmed in an NME article where the song was described as Bellamy's "ode to fatherhood." The instrumental version was featured in the end credits of the film World War Z.

== Release ==
"Follow Me" was originally released to radio stations as a promotional single from The 2nd Law, alongside "Panic Station" on 24 September 2012. In October, it was confirmed that the song would serve as the third single from the album, after much speculation and debate. In the lead up to the single release, Muse issued another single, a live version of the song, recorded during the band's performance at the O2 Arena during the 2nd Law Tour. It was offered as a free download on 31 October 2012. Muse released a lyric video for the song on 1 November 2012.

== Music video ==
The music video for "Follow Me" was released on 11 December 2012. Similarly to the video for "Resistance", it consists of live footage from the O2 Arena and Atlas Arena during the 2nd Law World Tour.

== Critical response ==
Digital Spy gave the song a positive note in their review of the album, stating "adding a dollop of reverb to 'Follow Me' enhances the track's doom-sodden message of clinging to strength from a dark place." AllMusic's Gregory Heaney wrote in his review of The 2nd Law about the electronic influences on "Follow Me" and the previous single, "Madness", saying that "their excursions into dubstep and dance music on tracks like 'Madness' and 'Follow Me' feel more like remixes than original songs."

== Track listing ==
Digital download
No.	Title	Length
1.	"Follow Me" (Jacques Lu Cont's Thin White Duke Remix)	5:54

UK promotional single
No.	Title	Length
1.	"Follow Me" (Album Version)	3:51
2.	"Follow Me" (Jacques Lu Cont's Thin White Duke Remix)	5:54

Follow Me (Live from the O2, London, 27 October 2012)
No.	Title	Length
1.	"Follow Me" (Live from the O2, London)	3:58

== Charts ==
Chart (2012–13)	Peak position
Belgium (Ultratop 50 Flanders)	31
Belgium (Ultratop 50 Wallonia)	37
France (SNEP)	56
Italy (FIMI)	41
Japan Hot 100 (Billboard)	37
Switzerland Airplay (Schweizer Hitparade)	40
US Rock & Alternative Airplay (Billboard)	47
US Alternative Airplay (Billboard)	19

== Release history ==
Country	Date	Format	Label
Europe	14 November 2012	CD-R (Contemporary hit radio)	Warner Music
United Kingdom	7 December 2012	Digital download	Warner Music
United Kingdom	10 December 2012	CD-R (Contemporary hit radio, BBC Radio 1 rotation)	Warner Music
United States	9 July 2013	CD-R (Modern rock / Alternative radio)	Warner Music
