= Knights of Cydonia =

- Standard artwork

Single by Muse

from the album Black Holes and Revelations
- B-side: "Assassin" (Grand Omega Bosses Edit)
- Released: 27 November 2006
- Recorded: 2005
- Genre: Rock; art rock; progressive pop; progressive metal
- Length: 6:07 (album version); 3:58 (radio edit)
- Label: Warner Bros.; Helium-3
- Songwriter: Matt Bellamy
- Producers: Rich Costey; Muse

Muse singles chronology
"Starlight" (2006)	"Knights of Cydonia" (2006)	"Invincible" (2007)

Music videos
- "Knights of Cydonia" on YouTube

"Knights of Cydonia" is a song by English rock band Muse. It is the closing track on their fourth studio album, Black Holes and Revelations (2006), (Note: On Japanese pressings of the album, "Glorious" is the final track.) and was released as the third single on 27 November 2006. The title refers to the Cydonia region of Mars, which gained public attention from the illusion of a rock formation which looked similar to a human face.

== Composition ==
The intro, as performed on the live album HAARP, is a citation of the five tone musical phrase from the film Close Encounters of the Third Kind. The song uses synthesised and live trumpet parts overlaid with vocals from both Matt Bellamy's higher and lower reaches, spanning B^{3}-E^{5}. The guitar sound in the song was inspired by the 1962 number one hit "Telstar" by the Tornados (George Bellamy, Matt Bellamy's father, was the band's rhythm guitarist). The song, taken in entirety, also bears a striking resemblance to George Bellamy's composition "Ridin' the Wind". The first noise heard in the song is an explosion, then a horse neigh. The first 2:03 of the song is a guitar solo to the tune of the lyrics, before Bellamy sings "Come ride with me, through the veins of history."

The intro passes through several different keys, starting in E minor, then modulating to C minor, and modulating again to G-sharp minor once the first verse begins. By the end of the first verse, it modulates back into E minor.

Bellamy has stated that on the album in general, he tried to create a vision of what is occurring in the song. For example, the bassline has a galloping rhythm resembling someone riding a horse.

== Release ==
The radio edit version was first aired on KROQ-FM radio on 6 June 2006, and released to other radio stations in the United States on 12 June 2006. The song was released as the third single from Black Holes & Revelations in the UK on 27 November 2006, debuting at No 10 in the UK Singles Chart (see 2006 in British music). It also hit the No. 10 spot on the Billboard Modern Rock Tracks chart in the United States, becoming their third top-ten hit on that chart.

Prior to its entry in the Singles Chart, "Knights of Cydonia" had been active in the Downloads Chart, and sat at No. 41 the same week that the physical release debuted at No. 10 in the Singles Chart. Three weeks earlier, the song sat at No. 104 in the Downloads Chart, marking a substantial jump in that time period. The song also reached number 2 in the charts in both Flanders and Wallonia of Belgium. It peaked at number 20 in Norway.

== Critical reception ==
The song was the winner of Triple J's annual Hottest 100 countdown for 2007, beating Silverchair's "Straight Lines" by only 13 votes, and was later voted No. 18 in 2009's Hottest 100 of All Time countdown. In 2012, "Knights of Cydonia" was ranked No. 53 on Rhapsody's list of the Top 100 Tracks of the Decade. In October 2011, NME placed it at number 44 on its list "150 Best Tracks of the Past 15 Years". The song was described by BBC Radio 1 DJ Annie Mac on 27 October 2006 as "six minutes and seven seconds of pure genius".

== Music video ==
The "Knights of Cydonia" video was shot over five days: three days in Romania; one day in London; and one day in Red Rock, California; it was made available on 11 July 2006. It was filmed and edited as a thematic smörgåsbord: a post-apocalyptic Spaghetti Western film, complete with beginning and end credits, with elements of kung fu, porno and acid western.

The video was directed by Joseph Kahn, and stars British actor Russ Bain as the protagonist (The Man With No Name), Richard Brake as the antagonist (Sheriff Baron Klaus Rottingham), and Cassandra Bell as the love interest (Princess Shane Kuriyami). The Man With No Name enters Cydonia, a small town under the grip of the cruel and oppressive Rottingham, who defeats and humiliates the Man With No Name. After a spirit journey in the desert, guided by a Valkyrian warrior, a shaman and a robot, the Man With No Name returns to Cydonia to get revenge. Throughout the video, the actors mouth out the lyrics, such as Russ Bain pilloried in town square mouthing "No one's going to take me alive," and Cassandra Bell at the gallows "You and I must fight for our rights." In both instances, the mouthed words occur after the song lyrics and complete before the song moves on to the next line. The band appears in some scenes, partly as holograms.

At the end of the video, the end of the credits read "Copyright MCMLXXXI" which are the Roman numerals for 1981. The filming location is given as the People's Republic of Socialist Romanistan.

== Live performances ==
The first live performance of "Knights of Cydonia" took place at a BBC Radio 1 event, Radio 1's Big Weekend, held at Camperdown Park in Dundee on 13 May 2006. Also performed at this event were "Supermassive Black Hole" and "Starlight", the first two singles from Black Holes and Revelations. Live performances of "Knights of Cydonia" give Matt Bellamy's intro falsetto more prominence than its studio counterpart, along with Dominic Howard's introductory drum pattern being included in the performance. Since 2008, live performances have included an introduction of Ennio Morricone's "Man With a Harmonica" from Once Upon a Time in the West where bassist Chris Wolstenholme plays a harmonica piece. Other live additions include Bellamy playing an extra guitar part during the solo at the end of the song, Howard ending the song with a short drum solo and the coda of "Space Dementia" played as a finale.

== Track listing ==
- Promo PRO-16112
1. "Knights of Cydonia" (radio edit) – 4:48
- US Promo CD-R PRO-CDR-101829
1. "Knights of Cydonia" (radio edit) – 4:42
2. "Knights of Cydonia" (album version) – 6:07 (6:06.863)
- 7" HEL3004, Digital download
1. "Knights of Cydonia" – 6:07
2. "Assassin" (Grand Omega Bosses Edit) – 5:19
- CD HEL3004CD
1. "Knights of Cydonia" – 6:07
2. "Supermassive Black Hole" (live from the Campo Pequeno in Lisbon)
- DVD HEL3004DVD
1. "Knights of Cydonia" (video) – 6:07
2. "Knights of Cydonia" (audio) – 6:07
3. "Knights of Cydonia" (the making of) – 10:59
4. Gallery

== Charts ==
=== Weekly charts ===
Weekly chart performance for "Knights of Cydonia"
Chart (2006–2008)	Peak position
Australia Digital Tracks (ARIA)	43
Netherlands (Single Top 100)	91
Norway (VG-lista)	20
Scottish Singles Sales (Official Charts)	7
UK Singles (Official Charts)	10
UK Rock & Metal (Official Charts)	1
US Alternative Airplay (Billboard)	10

=== Year-end charts ===
Year-end chart performance for "Knights of Cydonia"
Chart (2006)	Position
US Alternative Songs (Billboard)	34

== Certifications ==
Certifications for "Knights of Cydonia"
Region	Certification	Certified units/sales
New Zealand (RMNZ)	Gold	15,000^{‡}
United Kingdom (BPI)	Platinum	600,000^{‡}
United States (RIAA)	Gold	500,000^{‡}
^{‡} Sales+streaming figures based on certification alone.

== Cover versions ==
- Oakland hip hop group Zion I released a notable remix of the song in 2008.
- A remix by Gramatik was released in the "Official & Bootleg Remixes, Colabs & Rare Tracks" album in 2012.
- In 2015 the song was sampled in and was used as the main theme for the launch gameplay trailer for Halo 5: Guardians.
