= The 2nd Law: Unsustainable =

Song by Muse

from the album The 2nd Law
- Released: 15 June 2012
- Recorded: 2011–2012
- Genre: Dubstep; symphonic rock; experimental
- Length: 3:48
- Label: Warner Bros.; Helium-3
- Songwriter: Matt Bellamy
- Producer: Muse

"The 2nd Law: Unsustainable" is a song by English rock band Muse released on their 2012 album The 2nd Law. The song's music video was made downloadable on 9 August 2012, but only after buying the deluxe box set of the album on the band's official site. The song appears to feature in a trailer for The 2nd Law, released on 6 June 2012, making it the first song released from The 2nd Law. Despite assumptions, due to it being the first sampling from the album, the song was never released as a single for the album.

== Composition ==
The song mixes various genres together. These include classical music, progressive rock, and dubstep. This mixture gained a mixed reaction from fans. However, despite the strong dubstep influences, the supposed electronic sound is produced through "real instruments". According to the band: "We went to see Skrillex in Camden around October. We went 'Fuck, it's so heavy', loved it. It was like a full metal gig, they had the circles of death, people were moshing, I hadn't seen a reaction like that to electronic music before. We took inspiration and came up with 'Unsustainable'. Some of that hard dubstep or brostep coming from America is capturing the imagination. The moshpit has moved from guitars and gone towards the laptop, so with that song we're trying to see if we can challenge the laptop. We created something that was dubsteppy but we wanted to see if we could do it with real instruments. We wanted to ask, 'Can rock bands compete with what these guys are doing?'" The song has four distinct parts: a classical music section (with a glitching female speaking voice in the background), a dubstep breakdown, a progressive rock bridge (also containing the female voice), and another dubstep breakdown to finish the song.

== Live performances ==
The song was first played live on October 16, 2012. These live performances usually contain the band grouped around the drummer (Dominic Howard) and play the speaking part in the background electronically. During The 2nd Law World Tour, the song was typically played as an opener before "Supremacy", or as the first song during the encore.

== Usage in media ==
On June 6, 2012, Muse released a trailer for The 2nd Law containing a sample of the song, which received mixed reactions regarding the change in style for the band. This release of the trailer led many fans to assume that the song would be the first single from the album; however, this assumption was later proved to be incorrect.

In 2013, the song was used by the Nine Network to promote the National Rugby League match between the Sydney Roosters and Canterbury-Bankstown Bulldogs, in which Sonny Bill Williams came up against his old club for the first time since walking out on them halfway through the 2008 NRL season.

In 2014, Ukrainian rhythmic gymnast Viktoria Mazur used the tune for her club’s routine at the 2014 Izmir World Rhythmic Gymnastics Championships.

== Charts ==
Chart (2012)	Peak position
France (SNEP)	100
UK Rock & Metal (Official Charts)	24
