= Survival (Muse song) =

Single by Muse

from the album The 2nd Law and A Symphony of British Music
- Released: 27 June 2012
- Recorded: 2012
- Genre: Progressive rock; symphonic rock; arena rock
- Length: 4:17 (Single version); 5:15 (with "Prelude")
- Label: Warner Bros.; Helium-3
- Songwriter: Matt Bellamy
- Producer: Muse

Muse singles chronology
"Neutron Star Collision (Love Is Forever)" (2010)	"Survival" (2012)	"Madness" (2012)

"Survival" is a song by the English rock band Muse, released as the lead single from their sixth studio album, The 2nd Law. It was the official song of the 2012 Summer Olympics, held in London, and was released following its premiere on BBC Radio 1.

== Background and writing ==
In 2011, the Muse songwriter, Matt Bellamy, was asked to compose a song for the London 2012 Olympics. Bellamy said the song "expresses a sense of conviction and determination to win".

"Survival" was played as the athletes entered the stadium and in the period before medal ceremonies; international broadcasters played it while reporting on the Games. In addition, the song was included on the album London 2012 Rock The Games. The song was also premièred live during Muse's live set for the London 2012 closing ceremony. However NBC, the channel that broadcasts the Olympics in the US, did not broadcast their set.

== Release ==
"Survival" premiered on BBC Radio 1 on 27 June 2012. It was the first single from the band's 2012 album The 2nd Law, released in October. The official music video was released on 4 July 2012. It showed a montage of past Olympic events, including both celebratory and disappointing experiences for certain athletes.

== Reception ==
The Associated Press called the song "a thundering rock anthem". NME columnist Mark Beaumont was perturbed that the band's latest track was "assimilated into something as annoying" as the Olympics. He continued that "'Survival' might be amongst the most ear-scorchingly, arse-burstingly, aneurysm-inducingly brilliant songs in Muse’s canon, but it’ll forever be deemed corny by its association with one long-past sporting event." Adam Boult of The Guardian referred to the track as "a hilarious five-minute onslaught of camp, falling somewhere between Queen, Gloria Gaynor and a Monty Python sketch. Swelling strings, battle drums, ludicrous falsetto shrieking and chugga-chugga guitar channelling the Little Engine That Could. It's as insanely overblown as the Olympics themselves." Jon Holmes of BBC Radio 4's The Now Show described it as an "Epically proportioned cacophony of enormous noise" that was like "the sound of an orchestra falling down some stairs" created by "throwing a hand-grenade into a music cupboard and recording the results". He depicted the drumkit as like "the noise of a rhino knocking a wall down" and said "this is the song I want to hear when the world ends".

== Track listing ==
Download; UK promotional single
No.	Title	Length
1.	"Survival"	4:17

French promotional single
No.	Title	Length
1.	"Survival" (Radio Edit)	4:17
2.	"Survival" (Album Version)	5:15

== Charts ==
Chart (2012)	Peak position
Australia (ARIA)	72
Belgium (Ultratop 50 Flanders)	22
Belgium (Ultratop 50 Wallonia)	13
Canada (Canadian Hot 100)	90
Canada Rock (Billboard)	34
Czech Republic Airplay (ČNS IFPI)	76
France (SNEP)	18
Germany (GfK)	87
Ireland (IRMA)	68
Japan (Japan Hot 100)	24
Lebanon (The Official Lebanese Top 20)	17
Netherlands (Single Top 100)	12
Scottish Singles Sales (Official Charts)	32
Spain (Promusicae)	25
Switzerland (Schweizer Hitparade)	40
UK Singles (Official Charts)	22
US Rock Songs (Billboard)	39

== Release history ==
Region	Date	Format	Label
Worldwide	27 June 2012	Download	Warner Bros. Records
United Kingdom	6 August 2012	CD-R (Contemporary hit radio, BBC Radio 1 rotation)	Warner Bros. Records

== See also ==
- Isles of Wonder: official soundtrack album of the London 2012 Olympics opening ceremony
- A Symphony of British Music: the official soundtrack album of the London 2012 Olympics closing ceremony.
