= The 2nd Law =

- Cover art by the Human Connectome Project

Studio album by Muse
- Released: 1 October 2012
- Recorded: October 2011 – August 2012
- Studios: AIR Lyndhurst (London); EastWest (Los Angeles); Shangri-La (Malibu); Capitol (Los Angeles)
- Genres: Alternative rock; art rock; progressive rock; electronica
- Length: 53:49
- Labels: Warner Bros.; Helium-3
- Producer: Muse

Muse chronology
The Resistance (2009)	The 2nd Law (2012)	Live at Rome Olympic Stadium (2013)

Singles from The 2nd Law
- 1. "Survival" Released: 27 June 2012; 2. "Madness" Released: 20 August 2012; 3. "Follow Me" Released: 7 December 2012; 4. "Supremacy" Released: 20 February 2013; 5. "Panic Station" Released: 31 May 2013

The 2nd Law is the sixth studio album by the English rock band Muse. It was first released on 28 September 2012 in Europe, 1 October 2012 in the United Kingdom, and on 2 October 2012 in North America through Warner Bros. Records and the band's own Helium-3 imprint. Recording took place in studios between London and Los Angeles County, beginning in October 2011 and ending in August 2012. The 2nd Law was Muse's second album to be solely self-produced by the band, following The Resistance (2009). It features additional musicians that performed brass, strings, and choir vocals.

The 2nd Law is a concept album about a deteriorating planet that its inhabitants can no longer live on. Major lyrical themes include societal collapse, totalitarianism, and the second law of thermodynamics, which the title references. Musically, the band chose to experiment significantly and create a sound that was distinct from their previous records. The album incorporates art rock, progressive rock, and electronic music with Muse's traditional alternative rock style. Acts such as Queen, David Bowie, and Skrillex were also key influences. The cover art features a 3D reconstruction of a human brain's white matter tract pathways, which was computed using data from the Human Connectome Project.

Five singles were released to promote the album: "Survival", "Madness", "Follow Me", "Supremacy", and "Panic Station". "Survival" had been chosen as the official song for the 2012 Summer Olympics in London, "Madness" became an international hit, most notably topping the Billboard Alternative Songs chart for a record-breaking 19 weeks, and "Supremacy" was performed live to begin the 2013 Brit Awards. The track "The 2nd Law: Isolated System" was included in the 2013 movie World War Z. The 2nd Law received positive reviews from critics and performed well commercially; it was a top ten-charting album in 31 countries and a number one album in 13 countries. For its sales figures, it was certified platinum in four countries, including the United Kingdom, and triple-platinum in France. At the 55th Annual Grammy Awards, the album was nominated for Best Rock Album and "Madness" was nominated for Best Rock Song. "Panic Station" was later nominated for Best Rock Song at the 56th Annual Grammy Awards the following year. As of 2018, The 2nd Law has sold over 1.6 million copies worldwide.

== Background and recording ==
The 2nd Law was primarily recorded at AIR Studios in London, England and EastWest Studios in Los Angeles, California, with additional recording taking place at Shangri La Studios in Malibu, California and Capitol Studios in Hollywood. In an interview with Billboard on 18 October 2011, the band's manager Anthony Addis revealed that Muse had begun recording their sixth album in London and that he expected it to be released by October 2012. Muse bassist Chris Wolstenholme had stated in an interview with BBC Radio 1 that they had aimed to begin recording The 2nd Law in either September or October 2011. During the recording of the album, band frontman Matt Bellamy jokingly described the album as a "Christian gangsta rap jazz odyssey, with some ambient rebellious dubstep and face-melting metal flamenco cowboy psychedelia" on his Twitter account.

In an interview with Kerrang! on 14 December 2011, Wolstenholme stated that the next Muse album would be "something radically different" from their prior releases. He also said that it felt as if the band were "drawing a line under a certain period" of their career with their sixth album. In another interview Chris mentioned that the band had experimented with music and sounds in particular. It was revealed via Muse's publicist Tom Kirk on his Twitter account that composer David Campbell was helping the band compose the album. In an interview in the April 2012 issue of NME, Bellamy said that the band were set to include elements of electronic music, with influences coming from acts such as French house duo Justice and UK dance-punk group Does It Offend You, Yeah?.

== Composition ==
"The 2nd Law: Unsustainable" (2012)
A 22-second sample from "The 2nd Law: Unsustainable" by Muse. The song was influenced by dubstep producer Skrillex.

The 2nd Law has been described by The Arts Desk as a concept album with main themes of "chaos, control, societal collapse and totalitarianism". The iTunes review of the album similarly described it as a concept album telling the story of "a resource-strapped planet that can no longer support its inhabitants". The music of The 2nd Law has been described as art rock, alternative rock, progressive rock, and electronic music. The album's first track, "Supremacy", has been compared to James Bond theme songs. "Madness", according to NME, features influences which draw from Queen's "I Want to Break Free" and David Bowie's Scary Monsters album. Instead of using a bass guitar for the song, Wolstenholme opted to use a Misa Kitara, a digital MIDI controller, to create the song's main bass riff. "Panic Station", the third track, has been noted as a funk rock song and features collaborations from people who had worked on Stevie Wonder's "Superstition". It also includes explicit lyrics, making The 2nd Law Muse's first album to feature the Parental Advisory label.

Bellamy stated that dubstep producer Skrillex was an influence when writing one of the final two tracks on the album – "The 2nd Law: Unsustainable". He also stated that the song "Follow Me" was written about his newborn son, Bingham Bellamy. The song was produced by electronic music trio Nero. Bassist Chris Wolstenholme wrote two songs for the album about his battle with alcoholism – "Save Me" and "Liquid State" – and provided lead vocals on both tracks, thus marking the first time Wolstenholme sang lead vocals on a Muse song. Bellamy revealed that during the recording of The 2nd Law he was reading the novel World War Z, which became a major influence on the album, especially the tracks "The 2nd Law: Isolated System" and "Survival". "The 2nd Law: Isolated System" was featured in the film adaptation of the novel.

== Packaging ==
The name "The 2nd Law" references the second law of thermodynamics, which is quoted in the track "Unsustainable" as follows:

All natural and technological processes proceed in such a way that the availability of the remaining energy decreases. In all energy exchanges, if no energy enters or leaves an isolated system, the entropy of that system increases. Energy continuously flows from being concentrated, to becoming dispersed, spread out, wasted, and useless. New energy cannot be created and high-grade energy are being destroyed. An economy based on endless growth is unsustainable.

The album's cover art, taken from the Human Connectome Project, represents the map of the human brain's pathways, "tracking the circuits in our heads and how we process information with bright, neon colors." The artwork was subsequently used by Muse in a social Connectome Project on 21 September 2012. As more fans joined the online project, the album art was built, representing the network of the neurons within the brain. As the album art branched and more fans joined the network, incremental segments of the album track "The 2nd Law: Isolated System" were released.

The album was released as a digital download, CD, CD+DVD (with The Making of The 2nd Law and bonus feature), and vinyl. A deluxe edition box set of The 2nd Law included a CD, DVD, double vinyl and three posters.

== Promotion ==
On 6 June 2012, Muse released a trailer for The 2nd Law with a countdown on the band's website suggesting a 17 September release date. The trailer, which included dubstep elements, was met with mixed reactions from fans. "Survival" was released as the album's first single on 27 June 2012 and premiered on BBC Radio 1's Zane Lowe show, along with the song's counterpart intro, "Prelude". The song served as the official song of the London 2012 Olympic Games and peaked at number 22 on the UK Singles Chart.

It was revealed by the band in an interview with NME magazine that "Madness" would be released as the second single. Released on 20 August, it was announced that the song would make its world premiere on BBC Radio 1 at 19:30 BST, but the track was leaked online beforehand, due to an unintentional early release in South Korea. The official music video for the song was uploaded on 5 September to the band's YouTube channel. The song had significant chart performance by peaking in the top 40 in several countries. It has peaked at number 25 in the UK, as well as number 45 in the Billboard Hot 100, making "Madness" the band's second-highest-charting song in the US, behind "Uprising". The song was also notable for topping the Billboard Alternative Songs chart for a cumulative amount of nineteen weeks, making it the longest-running number-one song on the chart. The previous record was eighteen weeks, held by the Foo Fighters with their song "The Pretender". The song has been certified platinum by the FIMI in Italy and the MC in Canada. The song has also been certified double-platinum by the RIAA in the US for 2,000,000 copies of the song sold.

"Follow Me" was revealed as the third single when several promo CD's allegedly sent to radio stations appeared on eBay. The official lyric video was released on 1 November and the official music video was released on 11 December, both on the band's official YouTube channel. The song failed to chart in the UK, but it ended up charting in Belgium, France, Italy, and Japan. "Supremacy" was released as the fourth single from the album on 25 February 2013. The song gained popularity when it was performed at the beginning of the 2013 Brit Awards. Due to this performance, the song charted and peaked at number 58 on the UK singles chart. The band conducted a competition to produce a music video for "Animals". The winning video was created by Inês Freitas and Miguel Mendes (Oneness Team) from Portugal. The winning entry was released on 20 March 2013. "Panic Station" was released as the fifth single on 31 May 2013, accompanied by a music video shot during the Japanese dates of The 2nd Law Tour. The music video was released on 22 April 2013 at 10:00 AM PDT on the official Muse YouTube channel. An interactive lyric video for the song was released, as well. The band had previously performed this track, as well as "Madness", on the 6 October 2012 episode of Saturday Night Live. The song failed to chart in the UK, but it peaked at number two on the Billboard Alternative Songs chart. Furthermore, "Big Freeze" was released in April 2013, but only for French radios and without a commercial release.

=== Tour ===
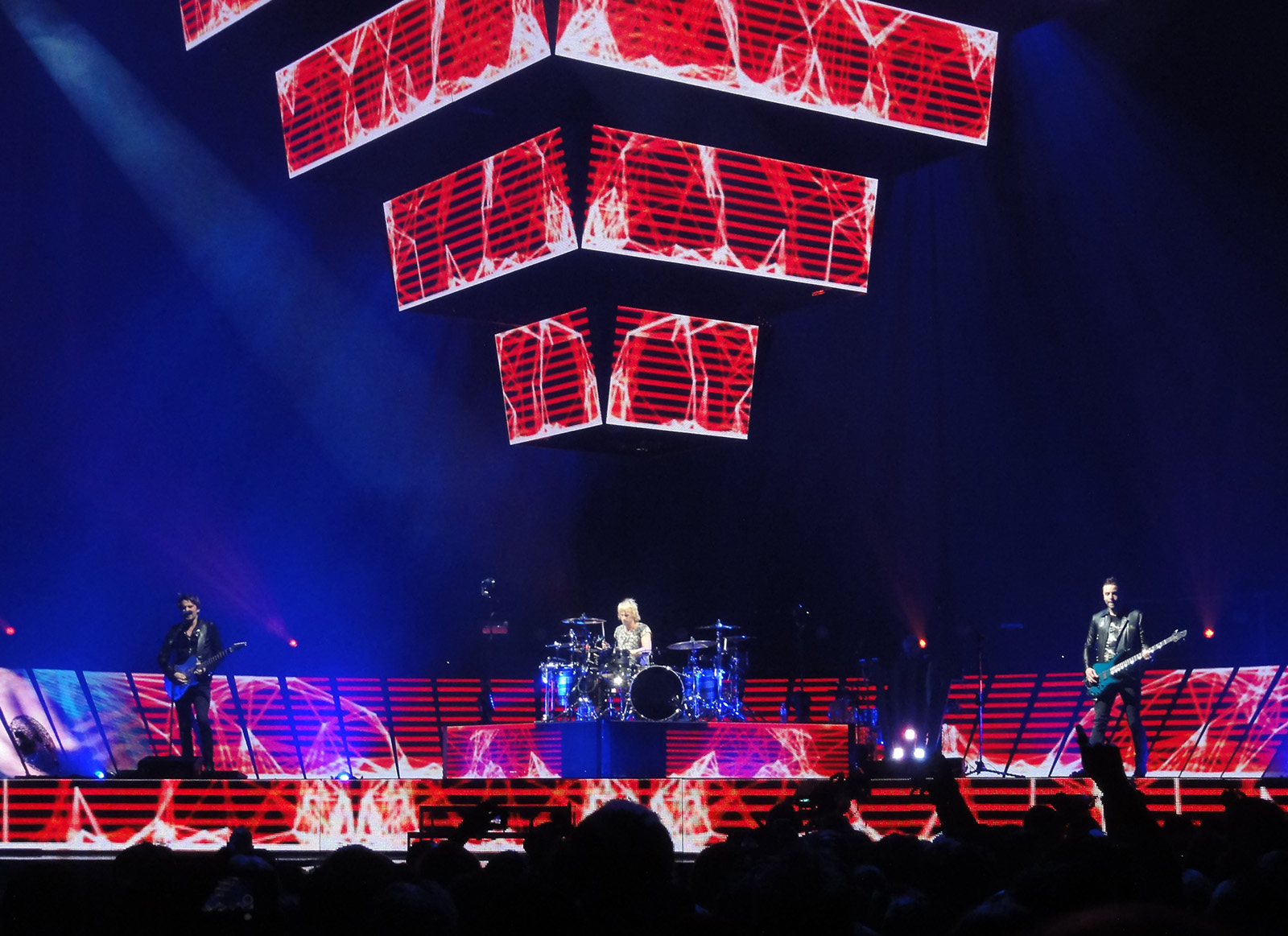
Muse performing in Melbourne in December 2013 during the 2nd Law World Tour

On 7 June 2012, Muse announced a European Arena tour; the first leg of the 2nd Law World Tour. The leg included dates in France, Italy, Ireland, Spain, Finland and the United Kingdom as well as other countries. They had also added North American dates to the tour.

Furthermore, the tour has an official live release on CD/DVD/Blu-ray: Live at Rome Olympic Stadium, which was filmed on 6 July 2013 at the Stadio Olimpico in Rome, in front of a crowd of 60,963 people. A show in Tokyo described by drummer Dom as 'the funniest ever' was also filmed. However, a release date for this recording has yet to be confirmed, with only one song from the concert being released as a Muse website members 'Christmas present.' At the conclusion of 2013, the tour was placed on Pollstar's annual "Year End Top 20 Worldwide Tours", and appeared 13th worldwide, earning over $103 million with 79 shows in 2013.

== Reception ==
=== Critical ===
Professional ratings
Aggregate scores
Source	Rating
AnyDecentMusic?	6.4/10
Metacritic	70/100
Review scores
Source	Rating
AllMusic	3/5 stars
The A.V. Club	C−
The Daily Telegraph	4/5 stars
Entertainment Weekly	C+
The Guardian	4/5 stars
Los Angeles Times	3/4 stars
NME	8/10
Pitchfork	5.5/10
Rolling Stone	3.5/5 stars
Spin	4/10

The 2nd Law received generally positive reviews upon release. On Metacritic, which assigns a normalised rating out of 100 to reviews from mainstream critics, the album received an average score of 70 based on 30 reviews, indicating "generally favorable reviews". BBC music critic Ian Winwood also gave the album a positive review, highlighting "Supremacy", "Liquid State" and "The 2nd Law: Isolated System", saying that Muse "present themselves in any guise they please". The Telegraph's Helen Brown rated the album four out of five stars, noting the album's eclectic influences and reserving praise for "Madness" in particular. The Observer's Kitty Empire also alluded to Muse's bombastic tendencies, saying "Bellamy is not blind to the contradictions of his band's attempts continually to ramp the ludicrousness up to 11; endless growth is, of course, unsustainable. But for now they remain pretty comfortable with the idea of obscene over-inflation. So should we."

AllMusic rated the album three out of five stars, noting "their excursions into dubstep and dance music on tracks like "Madness" and "Follow Me" feel more like remixes than original songs. Songs like these definitely have the spine of Muse tracks, but the production that's built up around them feels almost alien." Kyle Anderson of Entertainment Weekly gave the album a grade of C+, claiming that "the band goes overboard with Queen-isms" and expressing disappointment at the lack of electronic music elements compared to the band's expectations that the album would be a departure from previous releases. The Guardian's Alexis Petridis rated the album four out of five stars, complimenting the band's ambition but finding fault with the album's bombastic tendencies which were also present on their previous albums, stating "no one goes to see a blockbuster for its profundity and deep characterisation. They go for the stunts and the special effects, both of which The 2nd Law delivers."

=== Accolades ===
The album was a nominee for Best Rock Album at the 2013 Grammy Awards. The song "Madness" was also nominated for Best Rock Song. The album listed at number 46 on Rolling Stone's list of the top 50 albums of 2012, saying "In an era of diminished expectations, Muse make stadium-crushing songs that mix the legacies of Queen, King Crimson, Led Zeppelin and Radiohead while making almost every other current band seem tiny."

=== Commercial ===
The 2nd Law had a very positive commercial performance, selling around 475,000 copies worldwide on its release. It debuted at number 2 on the Billboard 200 with 102,000 copies sold in its first week, giving Muse the highest charting debut of their career in the US, although it sold fewer copies than the debut of their previous album The Resistance, which debuted at number three with 128,000 copies. It has sold 485,000 copies in the US as of May 2015. It also debuted at number 2 in Australia, Germany, Ireland, Korea and Spain. The album gave Muse their fourth number 1 debut in the UK with first week sales of 108,536 copies, while also debuting at number 1 in 13 other countries. It has sold 255,000 copies in the UK in 2012 alone.

== Track listing ==
All songs written and sung by Matt Bellamy, except "Save Me" and "Liquid State" written and sung by Chris Wolstenholme.

The 2nd Law – Standard edition
No.	Title	Length
1.	"Supremacy"	4:55
2.	"Madness"	4:39
3.	"Panic Station"	3:03
4.	"Prelude"	0:57
5.	"Survival"	4:17
6.	"Follow Me"	3:51
7.	"Animals"	4:23
8.	"Explorers"	5:48
9.	"Big Freeze"	4:41
10.	"Save Me"	5:09
11.	"Liquid State"	3:03
12.	"The 2nd Law: Unsustainable"	3:47
13.	"The 2nd Law: Isolated System"	4:59
Total length:		53:49

The 2nd Law – Deluxe edition (DVD)
No.	Title	Length
1.	"The Making of The 2nd Law"	32:27
2.	"Bonus Feature"	7:52
Total length:		40:19

== Personnel ==
Personnel adapted from album liner notes.

Muse

- Matt Bellamy – vocals, guitars, keyboards, synthesisers, orchestral arrangements, production, additional mixing (track 6)
- Dominic Howard – drums, percussion, synthesisers, production
- Chris Wolstenholme – bass, vocals, synthesisers, additional drums (track 1), production

Additional musicians

- David Campbell – conductor and additional orchestral arrangements
- Alyssa Park – first violinist
- Gerardo Hilera, Josefin Vergara, Kevin Connolly, Mario Deleon, Michele Richards, Ruth Bruegger, Sara Parkins, Sara Thornblade, Serena McKinny, Songa Lee, Tamara Hatwan – violins
- Andrew Duckles – principal viola
- Alma Fernandez, David Walther, Matthew Funes – violas
- Steve Richards – principal cello
- Erika Duke-Kirkpatrick, George Kim Scholes, Suzie Katayama – cellos
- Dave Stone, Oscar Hidalgo – basses
- Rodrigo D'Erasmo – additional violin (tracks 4, 8)
- Daniela Savoldi – additional cello (tracks 4, 8)
- Wayne Bergeron – trumpet solo (1)
- Joseph Meyer, Nathan Campbell – French horns
- Alan Kaplan, Charles Morillas, Craig Gosnell, Nick Lane – trombones
- Charles Findlay, Steven Madaio – trumpets (track 3)
- Tom Saviano – tenor saxophone
- Donald Markese – baritone saxophone
- Katie Razzall – spoken words (tracks 12–13)
- Tom Kirk – additional chanting (track 5)
- Bingham Bellamy – Additional sound effects (track 6)
- Aaron Page, Antonio Sol, Baraka Williams, Beth Anderson, Bobbi Page, Christian Ebner, Chyla Anderson, Clydene Jackson, Edie Lehmann Boddicker, Francesca Proponis, Gabriel Mann, Gerald White, Gregory Jasperse, Gregory Whipple, Guy Maeda, Joanna Bushnell, John Kimberling, Karen Harper, Karen Whipple Schnurr, Kathryn Reid, Kimberley Lingo Hinze, Michael Geiger, Oren Waters, Raven Kane, Reid Bruton, Robert Joyce, Scottie Haskell, Susie Stevens Logan, Teri Koide, Walter Harrah – choir

Production

- Tommaso Colliva – additional production, engineering, mixing (track 4), additional mixing (track 6)
- Adrian Bushby – additional production, engineering
- Paul Reeve – additional vocal production (tracks 10 & 11)
- Nero – additional production and mixing (track 6)
- Chris Lord-Alge – mixing (tracks 1, 5, 7, 9 & 12)
- Mark "Spike" Stent – mixing (tracks 2, 8, & 10)
- Rich Costey – mixing (tracks 3, 11 & 13)
- Alessandro Cortini – additional synthesiser engineering
- Brendan Dekora – engineering assistance
- Olga Fitzroy – engineering assistance
- Sean Oakley – engineering assistance
- Tom Bailey – engineering assistance
- Ted Jensen – mastering

Additional personnel

- Gavin Bond – photography
- The Human Connectome Project – cover art

== Charts ==
=== Weekly charts ===
Weekly chart performance for The 2nd Law
Chart (2012)	Peak position
Australian Albums (ARIA)	2
Austrian Albums (Ö3 Austria)	1
Belgian Albums (Ultratop Flanders)	1
Belgian Albums (Ultratop Wallonia)	1
Canadian Albums (Billboard)	2
Croatian Albums Chart	9
Czech Albums Chart	5
Danish Albums (Hitlisten)	2
Dutch Albums (Album Top 100)	1
Finnish Albums (Suomen virallinen lista)	1
French Albums (SNEP)	1
German Albums (Offizielle Top 100)	2
Hungarian Albums (MAHASZ)	2
Irish Albums (IRMA)	2
Italian Albums (FIMI)	1
Japanese Albums (Oricon)	5
New Zealand Albums (RMNZ)	1
Norwegian Albums (VG-lista)	1
Polish Albums (ZPAV)	2
Portuguese Albums (AFP)	1
Russian Albums (2M)	2
Scottish Albums (Official Charts)	1
Slovenian Albums Chart	4
South Korean Albums (Circle)	2
Spanish Albums (Promusicae)	2
Swedish Albums (Sverigetopplistan)	6
Swiss Albums (Schweizer Hitparade)	1
UK Albums (Official Charts)	1
UK Rock & Metal Albums (Official Charts)	1
US Billboard 200	2
US Digital Albums (Billboard)	2
US Top Alternative Albums (Billboard)	2
US Top Rock Albums (Billboard)	2

=== Year-end charts ===
2012 year-end chart performance for The 2nd Law
Chart (2012)	Peak position
Argentine Albums (CAPIF)	62
Australian Albums (ARIA)	73
Austrian Albums (Ö3 Austria)	38
Belgian Albums (Ultratop Flanders)	14
Belgian Albums (Ultratop Wallonia)	5
Danish Albums (Hitlisten)	42
Dutch Albums (Album Top 100)	24
Finnish Albums (Suomen virallinen lista)	25
French Albums (SNEP)	8
German Albums (Offizielle Top 100)	67
Hungarian Albums (MAHASZ)	13
Italian Albums (FIMI)	20
Mexican Albums (AMPROFON)	71
Polish Albums (ZPAV)	78
Russian Albums (2M)	18
South Korean International Albums (Gaon)	11
Swiss Albums (Schweizer Hitparade)	6
UK Albums (OCC)	32
US Billboard 200	154
US Alternative Albums (Billboard)	24
Worldwide Albums (IFPI)	21

2013 year-end chart performance for The 2nd Law
Chart (2013)	Peak position
Argentine Albums (CAPIF)	69
Belgian Albums (Ultratop Flanders)	63
Belgian Albums (Ultratop Wallonia)	30
Dutch Albums (Album Top 100)	96
French Albums (SNEP)	43
Italian Albums (FIMI)	46
Swiss Albums (Schweizer Hitparade)	47
US Billboard 200	113
US Alternative Albums (Billboard)	18
US Rock Albums (Billboard)	27

== Certifications ==
Certifications for The 2nd Law
Region	Certification	Certified units/sales
Belgium (BRMA)	Gold	15,000^{*}
Canada (Music Canada)	Platinum	80,000^{^}
Denmark (IFPI Danmark)	Gold	10,000^{^}
Finland (Musiikkituottajat)	Gold	16,427
France (SNEP)	3× Platinum	300,000^{*}
Germany (BVMI)	Gold	100,000^{‡}
Ireland (IRMA)	Gold	7,500^{^}
Italy (FIMI)	2× Platinum	100,000^{‡}
Mexico (AMPROFON)	Gold	30,000^{^}
Netherlands (NVPI)	Gold	25,000^{^}
New Zealand (RMNZ)	Gold	7,500^{^}
Poland (ZPAV)	Gold	10,000^{*}
Spain (Promusicae)	Gold	20,000^{‡}
Switzerland (IFPI Switzerland)	Platinum	30,000^{^}
United Kingdom (BPI)	Platinum	300,000^{^}
United States (RIAA)	Gold	500,000^{^}
Summaries
Europe (IFPI)	Platinum	1,000,000^{*}
Worldwide (2012)	—	1,600,000
^{*} Sales figures based on certification alone.^{^} Shipments figures based on certification alone.^{‡} Sales+streaming figures based on certification alone.

== Release history ==
Release history and formats for The 2nd Law
Country	Date	Format	Label
Australia	28 September 2012	Standard, deluxe, box set, 2 LP	Warner Bros., Helium-3
Austria	28 September 2012	Standard, deluxe, box set, 2 LP	Warner Bros., Helium-3
Belgium	28 September 2012	Standard, deluxe, box set, 2 LP	Warner Bros., Helium-3
Finland	28 September 2012	Standard, deluxe, box set, 2 LP	Warner Bros., Helium-3
Germany	28 September 2012	Standard, deluxe, box set, 2 LP	Warner Bros., Helium-3
Ireland	28 September 2012	Standard, deluxe, box set, 2 LP	Warner Bros., Helium-3
Netherlands	28 September 2012	Standard, deluxe, box set, 2 LP	Warner Bros., Helium-3
Switzerland	28 September 2012	Standard, deluxe, box set, 2 LP	Warner Bros., Helium-3
Poland	1 October 2012	Standard, deluxe, 2 LP	Warner Bros., Helium-3
United Kingdom	1 October 2012	Standard, deluxe, box set, 2 LP	Warner Bros., Helium-3
Italy	2 October 2012	Standard, deluxe, box set, 2 LP	Warner Bros., Helium-3
Canada	2 October 2012	Standard, deluxe, 2 LP	Warner Bros., Helium-3
United States	2 October 2012	Standard, deluxe, 2 LP	Warner Bros., Helium-3
Japan	3 October 2012	Standard, deluxe, box set	Warner Bros., Helium-3
Sweden	3 October 2012	Standard, deluxe, box set, 2 LP	Warner Bros., Helium-3

== Notes and references ==
Notes
