= Animals (Muse song) =

Song by Muse

from the album The 2nd Law
- Released: 28 September 2012
- Recorded: 2011–2012
- Genre: Progressive rock; art rock; alternative rock
- Length: 4:23
- Label: Warner Bros.; Helium-3
- Songwriter: Matt Bellamy
- Producer: Muse

"Animals" is a song by English rock band Muse. It is the seventh track on their sixth studio album, The 2nd Law (2012). A music video for the song was released on 22 April 2013, which was fan-created during an open competition to create a music video for the song. The song had a positive reception from music critics.

== Composition ==
"Animals", which is performed mainly in a 5/4 time signature, features a fast tempo of 170 beats per minute with multiple guitar riffs throughout the song as well as a short guitar solo and a climactic ending. The ending also features noise picked up from Wall Street trading floors. According to NME, the song depicts deteriorating economies under weight of "stock market savagery, industries desperate to 'advertise, franchise, kill the competition', and the greed of bankers." Band drummer Dominic Howard described the song as The 2nd Law's most political song, aimed at the bankers and people "who gambled everyone’s money and ended up putting countries in debt."

== Music video ==
For the "Animals" music video, Muse created a competition open to the public in December 2012, in association with Genero.tv, which had people create their own music video for the song. The fans voted for which finalist would be selected as the winner, and eventually, Inês Freitas and Miguel Mendes of Portugal, known together as "onenessteam", were selected as the winner. The video was aired during one of the live shows during The 2nd Law World Tour. The video was uploaded to the band's official YouTube channel on 22 April 2013.

The animated music video takes place in a city where tall black entities wearing red ties (the government) walk around collecting money from small entities (the citizens) to fix a financial crisis. However, their money isn't enough. One of the government members then gets an idea by making a giant shredder-like machine that converts the citizens into money. They invite the citizens into the city's tallest building, which is possibly their headquarters, for the citizens' parts to be taken off and thrown into the machine. However, the government members start taking each other's parts and throwing them into the machine and end up holding into each other while one of them is about to fall into the machine, causing all of them to fall into it and be converted into money as the money indicator goes from "-010,974,642" to "000,000,000" and its bar goes full and turns green. A citizen throws an ignited match into the stack of money, burning it.

== Critical reception ==
"Animals" received generally positive reviews from critics. Andrew W. Gold of Sputnikmusic complimented the song, saying that it is "the most genuine song Muse have done in years". Ian Cohen of Pitchfork described the song as the moment "where Muse ditch the pyrotechnics for actual piano-tinkling prog and remind you that they're still not that far off from Showbiz, their charming debut of slavish OK Computer worship." Colin Stutz of Idolator labeled the song as the most "straight-forward" song on The 2nd Law. Iann Robinson of CraveOnline had a more negative reaction to the song, labeling it "something Muse found in Radiohead's dumpster".

== Personnel ==
Personnel adapted from The 2nd Law album notes.

Muse

- Matt Bellamy – vocals, guitar, keyboards
- Chris Wolstenholme – bass guitar
- Dominic Howard – drums

Technical personnel

- Adrian Bushby – engineering, additional production
- Tommaso Colliva – engineering, additional production
- Chris Lord-Alge – mixing
- Ted Jensen – mastering
- Matt Bellamy – production
