= Madness (Muse song) =

2012 single by Muse

Single by Muse

from the album The 2nd Law
- Released: 20 August 2012
- Recorded: 2011–2012
- Genre: Electronic rock; synth-pop; soft rock; R&B
- Length: 4:39 (album version); 3:38 (radio edit)
- Label: Warner Bros.; Helium-3
- Songwriter: Matt Bellamy
- Producer: Muse

Muse singles chronology
"Survival" (2012)	"Madness" (2012)	"Follow Me" (2012)

"Madness" is a song by the English rock band Muse. It is the second track and second single from Muse's sixth studio album, The 2nd Law (2012), released as a download on 20 August 2012. It was written by singer and guitarist Matt Bellamy and produced by the band. The music video premiered on 5 September 2012.

"Madness" spent 19 weeks at number one on Billboard's Alternative Songs chart, becoming the second-longest-running number-one song on the chart. The song earned a nomination in the Best Rock Song category at the 2013 Grammy Awards.

== Background and writing ==
"Madness" is an electronic rock, synth-pop, soft rock, and R&B song. According to NME, "Madness" draws influences from Queen's "I Want to Break Free", George Michael's "Faith" and some instrumental elements of his other hit "I Want Your Sex". During a preview of The 2nd Law on French site Jeuxactu, the song was said to resemble Depeche Mode and described as "calm, languid and sweet". Matt Bellamy stated that the song started as a personal reflection after a fight with his girlfriend Kate Hudson, and how, after she had gone to her mother's house, he began to realise "yeah, she was right, wasn't she?" In a separate interview, Bellamy stated the song was the band's attempt to strip down the sound of the album, and that the song has its roots in twelve-bar blues with gospel, soul and R&B influences. He went on to conclude that, "It's the song I'm probably most proud of on the album for sure."

== Music video ==
The "Madness" music video was uploaded to Muse's YouTube channel on 5 September 2012. This video saw the second collaboration between the band and director Anthony Mandler, who previously directed the music video for "Neutron Star Collision (Love Is Forever)". Jacquelyn London edited it. The director of photography was David Devlin. The video was filmed on the Red Line platform at Los Angeles Union Station. The two main characters are played by models Erin Wasson and Max Silberman.

== Release and reception ==
"Madness" was released as a download on 20 August 2012, with an accompanying lyric video for the song being uploaded shortly after. NME described the song as "taking the defining noise of 'bass music' and using it to create slinky, soft rock sex music." The track review goes on to call it a brilliant single and states that Muse have "tamed the shark" following their declaration that Muse had jumped the shark with "Survival". Diffuser.fm noted that the single "doesn't sound like the Muse that established itself as one of the world's biggest rock bands" but that "the unusual blend of sounds works far better than it probably should", giving the track 8/10.

Rolling Stone stated that the single sees Muse "swap bombastic bass brutality with wubby subtleties as Matthew Bellamy croons over a surprisingly gentle pop track." Radio Times described it as "George Michael's ‘Faith’ underwater". In a negative review of the song, Robert Myers of The Village Voice wrote that "the band's U2 imitation has finally caught up to Achtung Baby and Zooropa". He further added that Muse "gets the surface details right but lacks the emotional and intellectual foundation to get at their inspiration's essence." Rolling Stone named the song the 37th best song of 2012. Chris Martin of Coldplay described the single as "Muse's best song yet". Jesse Quin of Keane stated that the single "has completely restored my faith in British music".

"Madness" spent 19 weeks at the summit of Billboard's Alternative Songs chart, making it the longest running number-one song on the chart, beating the previous record of 18 weeks set by Foo Fighters' "The Pretender". The record was later broken again by Portugal. The Man's "Feel It Still" in 2017, which spent 20 weeks at the number-one spot. "Madness" was nominated for Best Rock Song at the 2013 Grammy Awards, but lost to "Lonely Boy" by the Black Keys.

== Commercial performance ==
"Madness" had a positive commercial performance, charting in several countries and peaking within the top 10 in Belgium (Wallonia), Iceland, Israel, Italy, Japan, Portugal, and South Korea. In the band's home country of the United Kingdom, the song peaked at number 25 on the UK Singles Chart. In the United States, the song peaked at number 45 on the Hot 100 and number three on the Hot Rock Songs chart. It topped the Alternative Songs chart for 19 weeks, breaking the record for the longest-reigning number-one song on the chart, which was previously held by "The Pretender" by Foo Fighters. That record later got overtaken by Portugal. The Man's "Feel It Still" in 2017 which spent 20 weeks at the number-one spot. In late 2023, for the chart's 35th anniversary, Billboard ranked "Madness" as the sixth-biggest hit in the history of the chart. The song has been certified gold by the IFPI in Switzerland, platinum by the MC in Canada and FIMI in Italy, and double-platinum by the RIAA in the United States.

== Track listing ==
Digital download
No.	Title	Length
1.	"Madness"	4:39

UK promotional single
No.	Title	Length
1.	"Madness" (radio edit)	3:38
2.	"Madness" (album version)	4:40

== Charts ==
=== Weekly charts ===
Weekly chart performance for "Madness"
Chart (2012–13)	Peak position
Australia (ARIA)	82
Austria (Ö3 Austria Top 40)	56
Belgium (Ultratop 50 Flanders)	41
Belgium (Ultratop 50 Wallonia)	10
Canada Hot 100 (Billboard)	43
Canada CHR/Top 40 (Billboard)	42
Canada Rock (Billboard)	10
Czech Republic Airplay (ČNS IFPI)	49
Denmark (Tracklisten)	38
France (SNEP)	14
Germany (GfK)	67
Iceland (Tónlist)	9
Ireland (IRMA)	74
Israel International Airplay (Media Forest)	9
Italy (FIMI)	9
Japan Hot 100 (Billboard)	9
Netherlands (Dutch Top 40)	33
Netherlands (Single Top 100)	43
Scottish Singles Sales (Official Charts)	27
South Korea (Gaon International Chart)	7
Spain (Promusicae)	30
Switzerland (Schweizer Hitparade)	27
UK Singles (Official Charts)	25
US Billboard Hot 100	45
US Adult Pop Airplay (Billboard)	11
US Hot Rock & Alternative Songs (Billboard)	3
US Pop Airplay (Billboard)	23
US Rock & Alternative Airplay (Billboard)	1
Venezuela (Record Report)	142

=== Year-end charts ===
2012 year-end chart performance for "Madness"
Chart (2012)	Position
Belgium (Ultratop Wallonia)	83
France (SNEP)	82
Italy (FIMI)	47
US Hot Rock Songs (Billboard)	24

2013 year-end chart performance for "Madness"
Chart (2013)	Position
US Adult Top 40 (Billboard)	33
US Hot Rock Songs (Billboard)	20
US Rock Airplay (Billboard)	3

== Certifications ==
Certifications for "Madness"
Region	Certification	Certified units/sales
Canada (Music Canada)	Platinum	80,000^{*}
Italy (FIMI)	Platinum	30,000^{*}
Mexico (AMPROFON)	Gold	30,000^{*}
New Zealand (RMNZ)	Gold	15,000^{‡}
Portugal (AFP)	Gold	10,000^{‡}
Switzerland (IFPI Switzerland)	Gold	15,000^{^}
United Kingdom (BPI)	Silver	200,000^{‡}
United States (RIAA)	2× Platinum	2,000,000^{‡}
^{*} Sales figures based on certification alone.^{^} Shipments figures based on certification alone.^{‡} Sales+streaming figures based on certification alone.

== Release history ==
Release dates and formats for "Madness"
Region	Date	Format	Label(s)	Ref.
United States	27 November 2012	Mainstream airplay	Warner Bros.	

== See also ==
- List of number-one Billboard Alternative Songs of 2012
- List of number-one Billboard Alternative Songs of 2013
