= Panic Station =

Single by Muse

from the album The 2nd Law
- B-side: "Madeon Remix"
- Released: 31 May 2013
- Recorded: October 2011 – July 2012
- Genre: Funk rock; dance-rock
- Length: 3:06
- Label: Warner Bros.; Helium-3
- Songwriter: Matt Bellamy
- Producer: Muse

Muse singles chronology
"Supremacy" (2013)	"Panic Station" (2013)	"Dead Inside" (2015)

Music video
- "Panic Station" on YouTube "Panic Station" (Lyric Video) on Muse.mu

"Panic Station" is a song by the English rock band Muse, released as the fifth single from their sixth studio album The 2nd Law (2012) on 31 May 2013. Written by Matt Bellamy, it was the first song from a Muse album to contain profanity; the first time it was used was in the B-side "Crying Shame".

== Music video ==
The music video for "Panic Station" was filmed in January 2013 in Japan when band was in the country for The 2nd Law World Tour. It was released on 22 April 2013. The video is set in Shibuya, Tokyo.

The original video featured the Rising Sun Flag in the intro. This drew the ire of many East Asian listeners, who felt that the flag represented Japanese militarism from World War II. The controversy led the band to apologise through Twitter and re-upload a new version of the video, which replaced the Rising Sun Flag with the Japanese flag.

== Reception ==
Most reviewers compared "Panic Station" to other songs. In a review of the album, the BBC's Ian Winwood wrote that the song "borrows from both Queen's "Another One Bites the Dust" and Michael Jackson's "Thriller", without ever attaining the majesty of either tune." The A.V. Club called it the album's "catchiest song" and thought "it’s not hard to imagine Bellamy strutting around the stage like Michael Hutchence, oozing sex with his stunning falsetto backing metal-pop riffs." The reviewer, however, concluded that it "would be a real triumph if it didn’t sound so much like another band." Helen Brown of The Daily Telegraph opined that the single had a "disco feel," with "nods at INXS's "Suicide Blonde", Queen’s "Another One Bites the Dust", David Bowie's "Fame" and Prince's "Kiss" – ends up sounding a bit like a Scissor Sisters number." Billboard noted that the song is "aggressive until it serves up a 70s-sounding falsetto chorus with audacious horns. It's all incredibly self-indulgent in an impressively restrained amount of time, with every Muse hallmark included and every riff a champion."

At the 56th Annual Grammy Awards, the song received a nomination for Best Rock Song. It has also been used in an episode of the British TV series Top Gear (season 19 episode 5).

== Track listing ==
Digital download
No.	Title	Length
1.	"Panic Station"	3:04
2.	"Panic Station" (Alternate Version Mixed by Madeon)	2:53

Promotional single
No.	Title	Length
1.	"Panic Station" (Album Version)	3:06
2.	"Panic Station" (Clean Version)	3:04
3.	"Panic Station" (Alternate Version Mixed by Madeon) (Album Version)	2:55
4.	"Panic Station" (Alternate Version Mixed by Madeon) (Clean Version)	2:53

== Charts ==
=== Weekly charts ===
Chart (2012–13)	Peak position
Belgium (Ultratop 50 Flanders)	19
Belgium (Ultratop 50 Wallonia)	30
Canada Rock (Billboard)	15
France (SNEP)	107
Switzerland Airplay (Schweizer Hitparade)	30
UK Rock & Metal (Official Charts)	4
US Hot Rock & Alternative Songs (Billboard)	27
US Rock & Alternative Airplay (Billboard)	6

=== Year-end charts ===
Chart (2013)	Position
US Hot Rock Songs (Billboard)	75
US Rock Airplay (Billboard)	27

== Release history ==
Country	Date	Format	Label
United Kingdom	24 September 2012	CD-R (BBC Radio 1 premiere)	Warner Music Group
Belgium	25 February 2013	CD-R (Contemporary hit radio)	Warner-Benelux
United States	25 February 2013	CD-R (Modern rock/Alternative radio)	Warner Music Group
Worldwide	31 May 2013	Digital download	Warner Music Group
United Kingdom	3 June 2013	CD-R (Contemporary hit radio; BBC Radio 1 rotation)	Warner Music Group
