= Map of the Problematique =

Single by Muse

from the album Black Holes and Revelations
- Released: 18 June 2007
- Recorded: August – December 2005
- Genre: Alternative rock; progressive rock; electronic rock; space rock
- Length: 4:18
- Label: Warner Bros.; Helium-3
- Songwriter: Matt Bellamy
- Producers: Rich Costey; Muse

Muse singles chronology
"Invincible" (2007)	"Map of the Problematique" (2007)	"Uprising" (2009)

"Map of the Problematique" is a song by English rock band Muse, released as the fifth and final single from their fourth studio album Black Holes and Revelations (2006) on 18 June 2007 as a download. The release date followed the two concerts the band performed at Wembley Stadium on 16 and 17 June.

== Composition ==
"Map of the Problematique" is an electronic rock song featuring heavy use of synthesisers, distortion, flanging and octave shifting. Written in the key of C minor, it moves in common time at a moderately fast tempo of 125 bpm. Lead singer Matt Bellamy's displayed vocal range spans from B♭3 to C5. His vocals in the song are overdubbed to create an echo effect.

The main riff does not feature any dominant chords, which gives it a more modal sound. The chords being played are C minor, E♭ major, A♭ major, and F minor.

The song has drawn frequent comparisons to "Enjoy the Silence" by Depeche Mode due to their similar chord progression and arrangement. Bellamy has also cited Depeche Mode as inspiration for the song in interviews.

The title is a reference to the book The Limits to Growth (1972) and the Club of Rome think-tank who would create a "map of the problematique" detailing the "global problematique" - a set of likely challenges the world might face in the near future.

== Recording ==
Originating from rehearsals before the recording of Black Holes and Revelations, "Map of the Problematique" was one of the later songs the band started work on. It was originally played on synthesisers before being transferred to guitar, giving it a darker sound, although initially the intention was to keep it as keyboard-orientated as possible. The rhythm section was recorded after the guitar tracks. This was different from anything the band had done before, according to bassist Chris Wolstenholme, "because the whole theme of the song was based more on the sound and creation of this sound".

The riff was written on keyboard. At the encouragement of the producer, Rich Costey, Bellamy recreated it on guitar by splitting the guitar into three signals, which were processed with pitch shifters and ARP 2600, Korg MS-20 and EMS Synthi AKS synthesisers.

== Track listing ==
Download
No.	Title	Length
1.	"Map of the Problematique"	4:18
2.	"Map of the Problematique" (Does It Offend You, Yeah? Remix)	4:24
3.	"Map of the Problematique" (AOL Session)	4:25

Muse.mu exclusive download
No.	Title	Length
1.	"Map of the Problematique"	4:18
2.	"Map of the Problematique" (Live from Wembley Stadium)	5:05
3.	"Map of the Problematique" (Rich Costey Edit)	3:40
4.	"Map of the Problematique" (Does It Offend You, Yeah? Remix)	4:24
5.	"Map of the Problematique" (AOL Session)	4:25

== Chart performance ==
The song reached number 18 in the UK singles chart in its first week of release, and was more successful than "Invincible", the previous single.

== Charts ==
Chart (2007)	Peak position
UK Singles (Official Charts)	18
