= Black Holes and Revelations =

Studio album by Muse
- Released: 3 July 2006
- Recorded: October 2005 – March 2006
- Studios: Miraval (Correns, France); Avatar (New York City); Electric Lady (New York City); Officine Meccaniche (Milan); Townhouse (London)
- Genres: Alternative rock; progressive rock; space rock; hard rock; electronic rock
- Length: 45:28
- Labels: Warner Bros.; Helium-3
- Producers: Rich Costey; Muse

Muse chronology
Absolution (2003)	Black Holes and Revelations (2006)	HAARP (2008)

Singles from Black Holes and Revelations
- 1. "Supermassive Black Hole" Released: 19 June 2006; 2. "Starlight" Released: 4 September 2006; 3. "Knights of Cydonia" Released: 27 November 2006; 4. "Invincible" Released: 9 April 2007; 5. "Map of the Problematique" Released: 18 June 2007

Black Holes and Revelations is the fourth studio album by the English rock band Muse. It was released on 3 July 2006 through Warner Bros. Records and Helium-3. It was produced by Rich Costey over four months in London, Milan, New York City, and southern France.

The album saw a change in style for Muse, with influences including Depeche Mode, Millionaire, Lightning Bolt, Sly and the Family Stone, and music from southern Italy. Like their previous albums, it features political and dystopian themes, with lyrics covering topics such as political corruption, alien invasion, revolution and New World Order conspiracies, as well as more conventional love songs.

Black Holes and Revelations entered the charts at number one in five countries, including the UK, and in the top 10 in several other countries, including the US. It was certified quadruple platinum in the UK and platinum in the US. "Supermassive Black Hole" and "Knights of Cydonia" entered the top 10 of the UK singles chart, while "Starlight", "Map of the Problematique" and "Invincible" reached the top 25. As of 2018, Black Holes and Revelations had sold more than 4.5 million copies worldwide.

Black Holes and Revelations received positive reviews and appeared on several lists of the year's best albums. It was nominated for the Mercury Prize and appeared in the 2007 version of 1001 Albums You Must Hear Before You Die. Recordings from the Black Holes and Revelations tour were released on the 2008 live album HAARP.

== Recording ==
Muse's third album, Absolution (2003), brought them mainstream exposure in the United States. Muse spent about two weeks writing and rehearsing for their next album at Studio Miraval, an old château in southern France. The producer Rich Costey, who had also worked on Absolution, joined them two weeks later.

The songwriter, Matt Bellamy, said Muse wanted to be free from distractions so that they could focus and be absorb different influences. The bassist, Chris Wolstenholme, said writing and recording was more relaxed than previous albums, as the band had no deadline. The group wanted to create a more personal album than Absolution. However, progress was slow and they had difficulty deciding which songs to work on. The group moved to New York City, where Bellamy spent time in clubs and learnt to DJ, influencing the dance elements of "Supermassive Black Hole" and "Map of the Problematique".

Bellamy used guitar amps including a Vox AC30 and a Ampeg V4. Muse took a more active role in using studio technology, having previously left its use to engineers. Costey wanted to capture Bellamy's "personality" as a guitarist, recording the sound of his fingers and plectrum on the strings. Hoping to change their working style, they purchased old synthesisers including a Buchla 200e and set aside time to learn to use them.

The bulk of recording was completed at Avatar and Electric Lady Studios in New York City. The album was finished at a studio in Italy, where Bellamy spent several weeks recording vocals. Costey estimated that the album took about four months to record, including mixing at Townhouse Studios, London.

== Music ==
On "Take a Bow", Muse wanted to blend classical, electronic and rock music. It opens with string arpeggios inspired by Philip Glass, backed by a Moog synthesiser. The "Map of the Problematique" riff was written on keyboard; at Costey's encouragement, Bellamy recreated it on guitar by splitting the guitar signal into three audio signals, which were processed with pitch shifters and synthesisers. "Assassin", influenced by the noise rock band Lightning Bolt, began as a long progressive rock song with a "huge" piano break before Muse trimmed it. "Supermassive Black Hole", a mixture of dance beats and guitar, was influenced by Bellamy's visits to clubs in New York City and the Belgian band Millionaire. Critics likened it to Prince.

Muse recorded the "Starlight" melody using two pianos at different octaves and layered samples of prepared piano. "Soldier's Poem" was written for Absolution, but rewritten with new lyrics and an arrangement inspired by "Can't Help Falling in Love" by Elvis Presley. The drummer, Dominic Howard, said Muse had planned to record it with a "massive, epic" approach, but decided to use a small studio with vintage equipment and few microphones. He described it as a "real highlight", with "some of the most amazing vocals I've ever heard Matt do".

"Knights of Cydonia" features mariachi trumpet and a "galloping" drumbeat and ends with a guitar solo. It was inspired by surf rock and the 1962 single "Telstar" by the Tornados, which featured Bellamy's father, George Bellamy. Bellamy said that the title "acknowledged that this is a bit funny, particularly when we are pushing the epic side of the band to almost comical levels ... There's a lot of freedom in being able to laugh at yourself." "City of Delusion" and "Knights of Cydonia" were influenced by Bellamy's interest in flamenco guitar.

== Themes ==
"Take a Bow" is an "attack on an all but unnamed political leader", incorporating lyrics such as "you corrupt / and bring corruption to all that you touch". These themes are carried in the tracks "Exo-Politics" and "Assassin". Bellamy said "Exo-Politics" describes an “orchestrated alien invasion for the purpose of increasing military budgets and building space weapons”, while "Soldier's Poem" is sung from the perspective of someone realising they are being used.

The themes involve such as the "New World Order conspiracy, unjustifiable war, abusive power, conspiratorial manipulation and populist revolt", and was influenced by the conspiracy theories. Bellamy said he finds "the unknown in general a stimulating area for the imagination", and this interest is reflected throughout the album, which features rebellious paranoia (particularly during "Assassin"). The album also includes more emotional themes, including regret, ambition, and love.

The title is taken from the "Starlight" lyrics. Bellamy told Q: "Black holes and revelations – they're the two areas of songwriting for me that make up the majority of this album. A revelation about yourself, something personal, something genuine of an everyday nature that maybe people can relate to. Then the black holes are these songs that are from the more ... unknown regions of the imagination."

== Artwork ==
The album artwork was photographed in Bardenas, Spain, and designed by Storm Thorgerson. The motif was inspired by the "galloping" of "Knights of Cydonia" and "Invincible", an allusion to the Four Horsemen of the Apocalypse.

== Release ==
On May 13, Muse performed at BBC Radio 1's Big Weekend in Dundee, Scotland, and performed "Supermassive Black Hole", "Starlight" and "Knights of Cydonia". "Supermassive Black Hole" was released as the lead single on June 19, 2006, and reached number four on the UK singles chart. It was followed by "Starlight", "Knights of Cydonia", "Invincible" and "Map of the Problematique". The album stayed at number one for two weeks on the UK Albums Chart, producing Muse's largest sales up to that point.

The first US single was "Knights of Cydonia", on 13 June 2006, which reached number 10 on the Billboard Modern Rock Tracks chart. It was followed by "Starlight" and "Supermassive Black Hole". "Starlight" was Muse's most popular single in the US at that point, reaching number two on the Modern Rock Tracks chart. The album debuted at number nine on the Billboard 200, making it Muse's first top-ten entry in the US.

Black Holes and Revelations was released on 3 July 2006 in the UK, followed by releases in the US, Australia, Taiwan and Japan. It was also available as a limited edition CD/DVD combination, that featured videos and live renditions of "Supermassive Black Hole", "Knights of Cydonia" and "Starlight". In addition, the album was re-released in the US on vinyl LP on 18 August 2009. The album was certified quadruple platinum in the UK on 22 March 2024.

Black Holes and Revelations sold 115,144 copies in its first week in the UK. It was certified quadruple platinum by the BPI, and had sold more than one million copies in the UK as of 2018. Black Holes and Revelations popularised Muse in the US.

== Tour ==
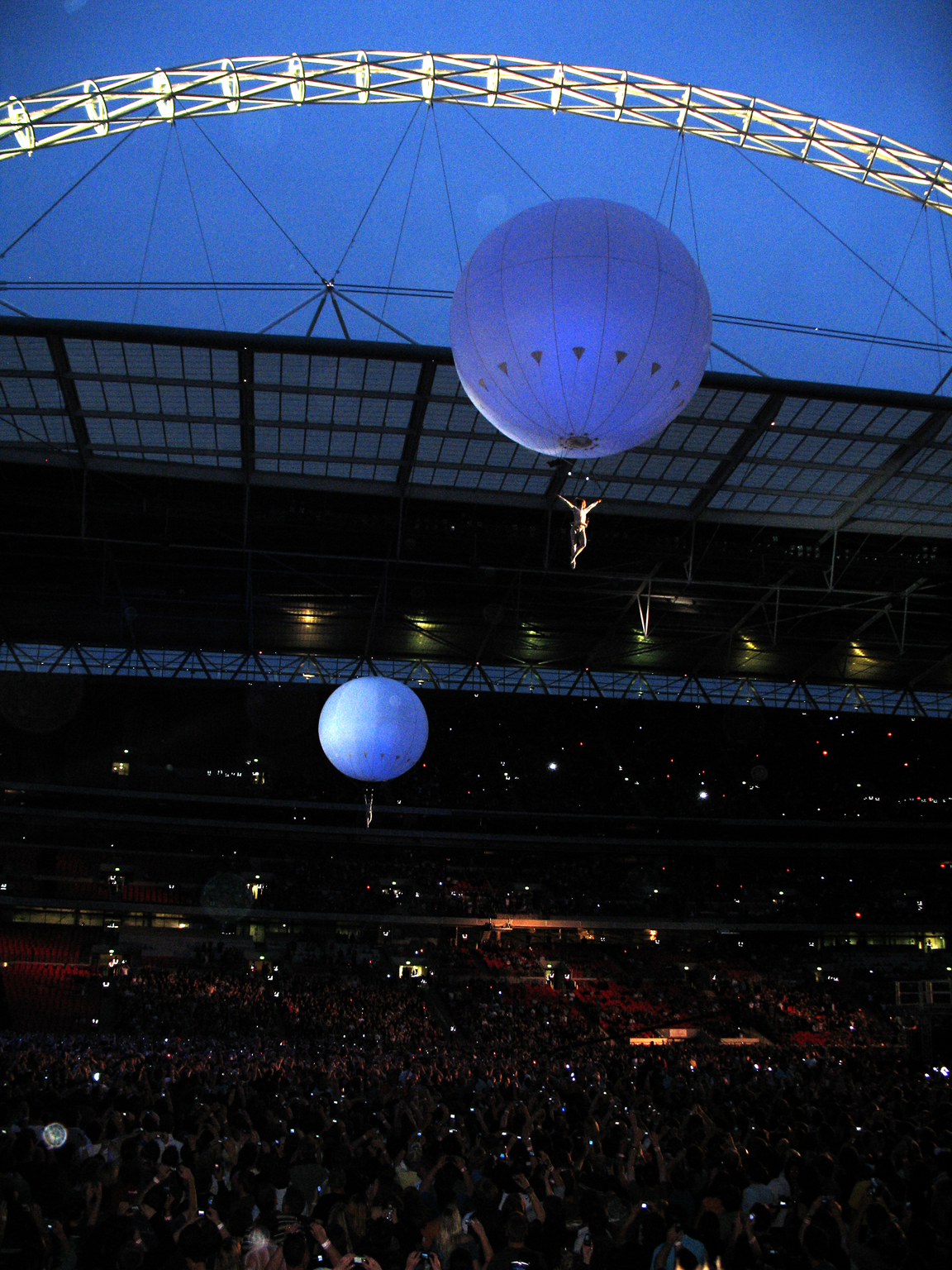
Acrobats suspended from giant white balloons float above the audience in the first, sellout night of Muse's Wembley gigs

In July 2006, Muse announced they would embark on their "biggest ever tour" in support of the album. The first shows included the Leeds and Reading Carling Weekend festivals, followed by a tour that visited most of the world's major continents. The tour saw them travelling around most of the world, and its shows became noted for their increasing usage of special effects. Some dates that were booked to play in support of My Chemical Romance in the US were cancelled after members of both bands were affected by food poisoning. The US stretch of the tour included dates at Madison Square Garden and a headlining slot at Lollapalooza.

Between the European arena and festival/stadium tours, the band embarked on a tour to Australia and Asia. The band were second on the bill at the 2007 Big Day Out Festival, behind headliners Tool. They also played sideshows in Sydney and Melbourne before embarking on concerts in South East Asia. That tour led to the band's biggest tour of Japan and a debut show in South Korea. The band then moved to America, playing their biggest North American headline concerts at the time at the Inglewood Forum and the Palacio de los Deportes arena in Mexico City.

The biggest concert of the tour was the two nights at the new Wembley Stadium, London, on 16 and 17 June 2007, which incorporated more extensive special effects than other concerts. The Wembley show was released as the live album HAARP.

The tour continued with many European festival shows, including headline appearances at Rock Werchter and the Benicàssim Festival. The tour then progressed to Muse's biggest North American tour at that point, including appearances at New York City's Madison Square Garden, Morrison's Red Rocks Amphitheatre and a headline appearance at Lollapalooza 2007. The band toured Eastern Europe in October before heading for an arena tour of Australia in November, finally ending at the KROQ Almost Acoustic Christmas. The following year saw Muse have a much more relaxed schedule, but still saw them play their first gigs in Dubai and South Africa at festivals, before making their gig debuts in South America on a three-week arena tour.

== Reception ==
=== Critical ===
Professional ratings
Aggregate scores
Source	Rating
Metacritic	75/100
Review scores
Source	Rating
AllMusic	5/5 stars
Blender	4/5 stars
Entertainment Weekly	B+
The Guardian	4/5 stars
Los Angeles Times	3/4 stars
NME	9/10
Pitchfork	4.2/10
Q	5/5 stars
Rolling Stone	3.5/5 stars
Spin	2/5 stars

On Metacritic, which aggregates scores from mainstream critics, Black Holes and Revelations has an average score of 75 based on 32 reviews, indicating "generally favourable reviews".

Several critics commented on the scale and bombast. Rolling Stone's Christian Hoard wrote that Black Holes and Revelations was "one of the year's most overblown records ... If you manage to suspend your disbelief a little, Black Holes and Revelations will push your pleasure buttons." In Entertainment Weekly, Will Hermes described it as "corny and bombastic ... also ambitious, impeccably built, and apt to induce fits of uncontrolled fist pumping. If prog is indeed the new punk, these guys are its Green Day." In Observer Music Monthly, Andrew Perry wrote: "Entertaining and rabble-rousing, daft and deadly serious, it's a fantastic record, with almost limitless appeal." In Stylus Magazine, Barry Schwartz wrote that Muse "bring loud, excessive, and proggy sometimes to the point of caricature, but they also do these things really, really well ... It's enough to suggest Muse are heading somewhere; they're just not quite there yet."

E! Online wrote that Black Holes and Revelations "strives to be nothing less than epic", and that "not since the Darkness's debut has anyone attempted to make hard rock this elaborate and blatantly gaudy". In NME, Anthony Thorton wrote that "Muse have made a ridiculous, overblown, ambitious and utterly brilliant album, with more thrills than their previous three put together". He argued they descended from acclaimed rock acts such as Queen, Roxy Music and David Bowie, but their "power and ambition" was unfairly dismissed by critics seeking "authenticity". He asked: "Why does music have to be so serious, so authentic? Rock is the only artform where authenticity is held supreme – more important than moving or provoking you. It's as if the whole rock canon has been assembled by a committee of sociologists rather than hedonists, madmen and geniuses." Trouser Press observed the additional influence of 1980s electronic acts like Orchestral Manoeuvres in the Dark and Depeche Mode, and said that Muse end up "delivering the goods more consistently" than on Absolution.

The Guardian wrote that the electronic elements "shouldn't work, but Bellamy's mania is so convincingly realised that even the most avowed Muse refusenik may have to finally concede defeat". However, The Los Angeles Times found the combination "jarring" and "slightly half-baked". The A.V. Club's Noel Murray gave Black Holes and Revelations a grade of D+, writing: "Give Muse credit for remaking itself over the years into a full-blown theatrical experience, and not just another echoing rock band. But that experience is, frankly, kind of shitty." In Spin, Brian Raferty wrote that Black Holes and Revelations was "admirable and terrible" and that Muse now "sound like a Muse knockoff". He praised "Starlight" and "Map of the Problematique", but criticised the lyrics as "mumbo jumbo about persecution". Pitchfork wrote that it was "the band's most autopiloted effort yet, a hacked-up last-gen rehash of said space jams, only now with greater emphasis on glitz and glam. Somehow Muse, always loveably lame, have managed to take a turn for the lamer." Spin, Stylus Magazine and Observer Music Monthly wrote that Muse had transcended the comparisons to Radiohead that had dogged their earlier albums.

=== Accolades ===
Black Holes and Revelations was nominated for the 2006 Mercury Prize, and listed in the updated 2008 edition of 1001 Albums You Must Hear Before You Die. It was named the year's second-best album by Q and third-best by NME. Classic Rock named it one of the ten essential progressive rock albums of the decade, and voted the 34th-best album of all time by readers of Q in 2006.

In 2011, NME named "Supermassive Black Hole" the 74th-best song of the preceding 15 years and "Knights of Cydonia" the 44th-best. On 26 January 2008, "Knights of Cydonia" was announced as the number-one song on Australia's 2007 Triple J Hottest 100. It was also ranked No. 18 in the Triple J Hottest 100 of All Time, 2009. It was also ranked No. 53 on Rhapsody's list of the Top 100 Tracks of the Decade.

== Track listing ==
All tracks are written by Matt Bellamy.

Black Holes and Revelations – Standard edition
No.	Title	Length
1.	"Take a Bow"	4:35
2.	"Starlight"	3:59
3.	"Supermassive Black Hole"	3:29
4.	"Map of the Problematique"	4:18
5.	"Soldier's Poem"	2:03
6.	"Invincible"	5:00
7.	"Assassin"	3:31
8.	"Exo-Politics"	3:53
9.	"City of Delusion"	4:48
10.	"Hoodoo"	3:43
11.	"Knights of Cydonia"	6:06
Total length:		45:28

Japanese release
No.	Title	Length
12.	"Glorious"	4:42
Total length:		50:10

== Personnel ==
Muse

- Matt Bellamy – lead vocals, guitars, piano, synthesisers, sampling, production
- Chris Wolstenholme – bass guitar, backing vocals, production, additional synthesisers (tracks 4 and 10), guitar solo (track 3), double bass (track 5)
- Dominic Howard – drums, production

Additional personnel

- Edoardo de Angelis – first violin on "Take a Bow", "City of Delusion", "Hoodoo" and "Knights of Cydonia"
- Around Art – strings on "Take a Bow", "City of Delusion", "Hoodoo" and "Knights of Cydonia"
- Marco Brioschi – trumpet on "City of Delusion" and "Knights of Cydonia"
- Tommaso Colliva – engineer
- Myriam Correge – assistant engineer
- Rich Costey – production
- Max Dingle – mixing assistant
- Tom Kirk – antique items crushed on "Exo-Politics"
- Roger Lian – mastering assistant
- Vlado Meller – mastering
- Mauro Pagani – string arrangements, string conductor
- Ross Petersen – assistant engineer
- Audrey Riley – string arrangements, string conductor
- Mark Rinaldi – mixing assistant
- Ryan Simms – assistant engineer
- Derrick Santini – photography
- Storm Thorgerson – cover photo
- Rupert Truman – cover photo
- Howie Weinberg – mastering

== Charts ==
=== Weekly charts ===
Chart (2006)	Peak position
Australian Albums (ARIA)	1
Austrian Albums (Ö3 Austria)	1
Belgian Albums (Ultratop Flanders)	1
Belgian Albums (Ultratop Wallonia)	2
Canadian Albums (Nielsen SoundScan)	11
Danish Albums (Hitlisten)	5
Dutch Albums (Album Top 100)	2
European Albums (Billboard)	1
Finnish Albums (Suomen virallinen lista)	3
French Albums (SNEP)	2
German Albums (Offizielle Top 100)	4
Hungarian Albums (MAHASZ)	33
Irish Albums (IRMA)	1
Italian Albums (FIMI)	2
Japanese Albums (Oricon)	11
Mexican Albums (AMPROFON)	84
New Zealand Albums (RMNZ)	6
Norwegian Albums (VG-lista)	6
Polish Albums (ZPAV)	41
Portuguese Albums (AFP)	17
Scottish Albums (Official Charts)	1
Spanish Albums (Promusicae)	20
Swedish Albums (Sverigetopplistan)	15
Swiss Albums (Schweizer Hitparade)	1
UK Albums (Official Charts)	1
UK Rock & Metal Albums (Official Charts)	1
US Billboard 200	9

=== Year-end charts ===
Chart (2006)	Position
Australian Albums (ARIA)	77
Austrian Albums (Ö3 Austria)	74
Belgian Albums (Ultratop Flanders)	29
Belgian Albums (Ultratop Wallonia)	20
Dutch Albums (Album Top 100)	50
European Hot 100 Albums (Billboard)	31
French Albums (SNEP)	22
Greek Foreign Albums (IFPI)	27
Italian Albums (FIMI)	45
Swiss Albums (Schweizer Hitparade)	29
UK Albums (OCC)	26

Chart (2007)	Position
Belgian Albums (Ultratop Flanders)	90
Belgian Albums (Ultratop Wallonia)	76
French Albums (SNEP)	96
New Zealand Albums (RMNZ)	47
UK Albums (OCC)	117

Chart (2008)	Position
UK Albums (OCC)	165

Chart (2009)	Position
UK Albums (OCC)	151

Chart (2010)	Position
UK Albums (OCC)	149

== Certifications ==
Region	Certification	Certified units/sales
Australia (ARIA)	Platinum	70,000^{^}
Belgium (BRMA)	Gold	25,000^{*}
Canada (Music Canada)	Platinum	100,000^{^}
Denmark (IFPI Danmark)	Gold	20,000^{^}
Finland (Musiikkituottajat)	Gold	15,000
France (SNEP)	3× Platinum	300,000^{*}
Germany (BVMI)	Gold	100,000^{^}
Ireland (IRMA)	Platinum	15,000^{^}
Italy (FIMI) sales since 2009	Platinum	50,000^{‡}
Japan (RIAJ)	Gold	100,000^{^}
New Zealand (RMNZ)	2× Platinum	30,000^{‡}
Norway (IFPI Norway)	Gold	20,000^{*}
Switzerland (IFPI Switzerland)	Platinum	30,000^{^}
United Kingdom (BPI)	4× Platinum	1,200,000^{‡}
United States (RIAA)	Platinum	1,000,000^{‡}
Summaries
Europe (IFPI)	2× Platinum	2,000,000^{*}
^{*} Sales figures based on certification alone.^{^} Shipments figures based on certification alone.^{‡} Sales+streaming figures based on certification alone.
