= Supremacy (song) =

Single by Muse

from the album The 2nd Law
- Released: 20 February 2013
- Recorded: October 2011 – July 2012
- Studio: Capitol Studios (Los Angeles, California)
- Genre: Hard rock; progressive rock
- Length: 4:55 (album version); 3:40 (radio edit)
- Label: Warner Bros.; Helium-3
- Songwriter: Matt Bellamy
- Producer: Muse

Muse singles chronology
"Follow Me" (2012)	"Supremacy" (2013)	"Panic Station" (2013)

Music video
- "Supremacy" on YouTube "Supremacy" (Lyric Video) on YouTube

"Supremacy" is a song by the English rock band Muse. It is the opening track on their sixth studio album, The 2nd Law (2012), and was released as the fourth single on 20 February 2013. "Supremacy" reached number 58 on the UK singles chart.

== Release ==
The Muse drummer, Dom Howard, likened "Supremacy" to a James Bond theme and said "it all goes a bit crazy 'Live and Let Die' in the middle". The Bond producer Barbara Broccoli denied that it had been considered for the 2012 Bond theme Skyfall, saying Adele had "always been our first choice".

A live version, featuring an orchestra and choir taken from the 2013 BRIT Awards performance on 20 February 2013 was released as the next single from The 2nd Law after "Follow Me" on 25 February 2013.

== Music video ==
The music video was released on February 2, 2013 through the NME website. It features people with black metal corpse paint doing extreme sports like BMX and surfing while Muse plays the song.

== Track listing ==
download
No.	Title	Length
1.	"Supremacy" (Live from the BRITs 2013)	4:47

Promotional single
No.	Title	Length
1.	"Supremacy" (Radio Edit)	3:40
2.	"Supremacy" (Album Version)	4:55

== Charts ==
Chart (2012–13)	Peak position
France (SNEP)	84
Switzerland (Schweizer Hitparade)	58
UK Singles (Official Charts)	58
UK Rock & Metal (Official Charts)	2
US Hot Rock & Alternative Songs (Billboard)	39

== Release history ==
Country	Date	Format	Label
Australia	20 February 2013	Digital download	Warner Music
United Kingdom	20 February 2013	Digital download	Warner Music
United States	20 February 2013	Digital download	Warner Music
United Kingdom	25 February 2013	CD-R (Contemporary hit radio)	Warner Music
