= Invincible (Muse song) =

- Standard artwork

Single by Muse

from the album Black Holes and Revelations
- B-side: "Glorious"
- Released: 9 April 2007
- Genre: Space rock
- Length: 5:00 (album version); 4:06 (radio edit)
- Label: Warner Bros.; Helium-3
- Songwriter: Matt Bellamy
- Producers: Rich Costey; Muse

Muse singles chronology
"Knights of Cydonia" (2006)	"Invincible" (2007)	"Map of the Problematique" (2007)

Music video
- "Invincible" by Muse on YouTube

"Invincible" is a song by English rock band Muse, released on 9 April 2007 as the fourth single from their fourth studio album Black Holes & Revelations (2006). Matt Bellamy has cited David Bowie's "Heroes" as an influence on the song. The B-side "Glorious" was included as a bonus track on the Japanese edition of Black Holes and Revelations.

The song debuted at number 21 on 15 April, becoming the first single from the album not to debut in the top-twenty of the UK Singles Chart the first week physical formats were available.

== Music video ==
The music video was directed by Jonnie Ross. The video premiered in the United Kingdom on 16 March 2007 at around 11:50pm on Channel 4. It can be seen at the band's official website. The song's length in the video is shorter than the album version but longer than the radio edit, lasting 4:30. It was filmed in Dublin before a concert.

The music video features the band playing through an "It's a Small World"-styled amusement park ride that goes through the events of the history of the world, including prehistoric dinosaur times, Ancient Egypt, Ancient Rome and World War II. There are also allusions to the September 11, 2001 attacks and evolution. The climax involves extraterrestrials with UFOs and giant mouse robots attacking the modern city. Humanity sounds the alarm, and all eras come together to prevail.

== Live performances ==
"Invincible" was performed at almost every show on the Black Holes and Revelations Tour. It has not been performed since 2008.

== Track listing ==
CD single (HEL3005CD)
No.	Title	Length
1.	"Invincible" (Album Version)	5:03
2.	"Knights of Cydonia" (Simian Mobile Disco Remix)	4:53

DVD single (HEL3005DVD)
No.	Title	Length
1.	"Invincible" (Audio)	4:30
2.	"Invincible" (Video)	4:30
3.	"Invincible" (Video; Live in Milan)	5:27

7" Picture disc (HEL3005)
No.	Title	Length
1.	"Invincible"	5:00
2.	"Glorious"	4:40

== Charts ==
Chart (2007)	Peak position
France (SNEP)	89
Scottish Singles Sales (Official Charts)	6
UK Singles (Official Charts)	21
UK Rock & Metal (Official Charts)	1
