= Starlight (Muse song) =

2006 single by Muse

Single by Muse

from the album Black Holes and Revelations
- B-side: "Easily"; "Supermassive Black Hole" (Phones Control Voltage mix)
- Released: 4 September 2006
- Recorded: 2005
- Genre: Alternative rock; pop rock; space rock; glam rock
- Length: 4:00 (album version); 3:35 (radio version)
- Label: Warner Bros.; Helium-3
- Songwriter: Matt Bellamy
- Producers: Rich Costey; Muse

Muse singles chronology
"Supermassive Black Hole" (2006)	"Starlight" (2006)	"Knights of Cydonia" (2006)

"Starlight" is a song by English rock band Muse, released in 2006 as the second single from their fourth studio album, Black Holes and Revelations. It reached number 13 on the UK singles chart and number two on the US Modern Rock Tracks chart.

== Composition ==
The NME reviewer Mark Beaumont described "Starlight" as "a spangly glam moment". It was written by the Muse singer, Matt Bellamy, and produced by Rich Costey. Bellamy said he wrote it on a boat in bad weather. The bassist, Chris Wolstenholme, said it was about missing loved ones. The band recorded the melody using two different pianos at different octaves and layered samples of prepared piano.

== Music video ==
Muse worked with Paul Minor on the music video, which was filmed in Los Angeles. In the video, the band perform on the deck of the MS Ocean Chie, a handysize bulk carrier. Band members are also carrying flares, in an attempt to be rescued, but this fails and they are abandoned.

Bellamy stated in an interview with The Sunday Mail that the band wanted to "create the idea of a band lost at sea because we see ourselves as being outside what's happening in the music scene" He also told the interviewer, Billy Sloan, that "it was an epic feeling playing on a huge platform with the sea all around us."

== Critical reception ==
MusicOMH stated that the song was "a track perfectly at home on drivetime radio" while saying it "showcases another side to the band's music and their staggering breadth of appeal." Leeds Music Scene reviewer Maria Pinto-Fernandes gave "Starlight" a glowing review, with a score of four and a half stars out of five. In her review, she commented that "the band's musical arrangements on the track do not come into being just by accident." She also stated that the song was just as passionate when performed live as when heard on CD. The Guardian reviewer Matt Mills praised the song for meshing "pop-rock drama with calls for revolution just vague enough that both the left and right could rally behind them."

Trouser Press likened the track to 1980s techno-pop and said that it "could have been lifted from an Orchestral Manoeuvres in the Dark album. A harsh review came from NME with the reviewer stating that the song "is a tune so chart-hungry it's virtually dry-humping JK and Joel's legs."

== Chart performance ==
"Starlight" entered the UK singles chart the week of 3 September at number 38 via downloads. The following week, and with the physical release in the United Kingdom, the single peaked at number 13. Afterwards, the single's chart position steadily declined, and it remained in the top 75 after fifteen weeks, during the week of 11 December 2006. The next week, "Starlight" had fallen out of the top 75.

It was certified platinum by RIAA for 1,000,000 paid downloads, but reached only #101 on the US Hot 100 as a result of minimal mainstream radio airplay (despite being a substantial hit on specialized modern rock radio stations).

"Starlight" also peaked at number two on Billboard's Modern Rock Tracks chart, Muse's fourth highest-charting single to date on any major chart in the US. It also charted in at number nine on the Triple J Hottest 100, 2006. It was also ranked at number four on Colombian radio station Radiónica's 2006 top 100.

== Track listings ==
=== 7" picture disc ===
1. "Starlight" – 3:59
2. "Supermassive Black Hole" (Phones Control Voltage mix) – 4:19

=== CD ===
1. "Starlight" – 3:59
2. "Easily" – 3:40

=== DVD ===
1. "Starlight" (video) – 4:07
2. "Starlight" (audio) – 3:59
3. "Starlight" (making of the video)
4. "Hidden Track"*

*The 'hidden track' on the DVD release is a short song. It is sung in a distorted falsetto voice with profane lyrics (largely variations of the word 'fuck' with some instruments in the background). Between fans it is often referred as "You Fucking Motherfucker", but in August 2018, Bellamy stated on his Twitter account that the actual lyrics of the song are "You Funky Motherfucker".

== Charts ==
=== Weekly charts ===
Weekly chart performance for "Starlight"
Chart (2006–2007)	Peak position
Australia (ARIA)	46
Belgium (Ultratip Bubbling Under Flanders)	2
Belgium (Ultratip Bubbling Under Wallonia)	6
Canada Hot 100 (Billboard)	69
Canada Rock (Billboard)	20
France (SNEP)	26
Germany (GfK)	70
Ireland (IRMA)	23
Italy (FIMI)	13
Netherlands (Dutch Top 40)	52
Norway (VG-lista)	10
Scottish Singles Sales (Official Charts)	8
Switzerland (Schweizer Hitparade)	30
UK Singles (Official Charts)	13
UK Rock & Metal (Official Charts)	1
US Bubbling Under Hot 100 (Billboard)	1
US Alternative Airplay (Billboard)	2

=== Year-end charts ===
2006 year-end chart performance for "Starlight"
Chart (2006)	Position
UK Singles (Official Charts Company)	136

2007 year-end chart performance for "Starlight"
Chart (2007)	Position
US Alternative Songs (Billboard)	15

== Certifications ==
Certifications and sales for "Starlight"
Region	Certification	Certified units/sales
Canada (Music Canada)	Gold	40,000^{*}
Denmark (IFPI Danmark)	Gold	45,000^{‡}
Italy (FIMI)	Platinum	50,000^{‡}
Mexico (AMPROFON)	Gold	30,000^{*}
New Zealand (RMNZ)	Platinum	30,000^{‡}
Portugal (AFP)	Platinum	20,000^{‡}
Spain (Promusicae)	Platinum	60,000^{‡}
Switzerland (IFPI Switzerland)	Gold	15,000^{^}
United Kingdom (BPI)	Platinum	600,000^{‡}
United States (RIAA)	Platinum	1,000,000^{‡}
^{*} Sales figures based on certification alone.^{^} Shipments figures based on certification alone.^{‡} Sales+streaming figures based on certification alone.
