= Supermassive Black Hole (song) =

2006 single by Muse

Single by Muse

from the album Black Holes and Revelations
- B-side: "Crying Shame"
- Released: 19 June 2006
- Genre: Alternative rock; dance-rock
- Length: 3:29
- Label: Warner Bros.; Helium-3
- Songwriter: Matt Bellamy
- Producers: Rich Costey; Muse

Muse singles chronology
"Butterflies and Hurricanes" (2004)	"Supermassive Black Hole" (2006)	"Starlight" (2006)

Music video
- "Supermassive Black Hole" by Muse on YouTube

"Supermassive Black Hole" is a song by the English rock band Muse, released as the lead single from their fourth studio album, Black Holes and Revelations, on 19 June 2006. It reached number four on the UK singles chart, Muse's highest position to date. It was nominated for the Kerrang! Award for Best Single in 2006. In October 2011, NME named it the 74th-best track of the preceding 15 years. In 2026, Rolling Stone named "Supermassive Black Hole" the 51st-greatest rock song of the 21st century so far.

== Composition and influences ==
"Supermassive Black Hole" has been described as alternative rock and dance-rock, with elements of funk. Bellamy said that the song was "the most different to anything we've ever done." Influences included bands such as the Beatles as well as several Belgian bands; specifically, Millionaire, dEUS, Evil Superstars and Soulwax. Bellamy said that "these groups were the first to mix R&B rhythms with alternative guitar. We've added a bit of Prince and Kanye West. The drumbeat isn't rocky, with Rage Against the Machine riffs underneath. We've mixed a lot of things in this track, with a bit of electronica; it’s different, slow, quite funky." In an interview with NME, Bellamy said "I was going out dancing in clubs around New York. That helped create tracks like 'Supermassive Black Hole'. Franz Ferdinand would have done it very well, with that dance type beat going on mixed with alternative guitar and I've always wanted to find that." The guitar solo performed during the bridge was added at the behest of Rich Costey, the producer of Black Holes & Revelations. Muse were against the idea of adding anything to the bridge, but Costey overruled them during the mixing session after finding the bridge to be lackluster in comparison to the rest of the song. Chris Wolstenholme, the band's bass player, brought a 4-string electric guitar from his hotel room to the studio and played a riff that was used as a guitar solo.

== Music video ==
The single's accompanying music video shows the band playing in a small furniture shop, clad in masks. This is intercut with images of dancers in Zentai suits which are then unzipped at the end to reveal beings made of space. The video was directed by Floria Sigismondi, who has directed videos for alternative bands such as Marilyn Manson, the White Stripes, Interpol, Incubus and the Cure. Sigismondi described the video as replicating a recurring dream she has experienced, in which dancers wearing masks of their own faces or mirrors and full body suits fill a dark mirrored room. There are also flashes of a black circle, a depiction of a supermassive black hole.

== Release ==
"Supermassive Black Hole" was released 19 June 2006 on vinyl, CD, and DVD, with a digital download available a week before the release. It peaked at number four on the UK Singles Chart, making it their most popular single released in the UK to date. In the US, it was the third single to be released, on 23 April 2007. The single reached number six on the Billboard Alternative Songs chart, making it the eighth highest-charting Muse single in the US. The song was certified platinum by the Recording Industry Association of America in 2015.

== Reception ==
NME gave "Supermassive Black Hole" 8.5 out of 10, describing it as "dirty funk guitars rub[bing] saucily against a Prince-ish falsetto over a pink leather couchette". Andrew Perry of The Observer wrote that it "thunderingly mixes Automatic-era Jesus and Mary Chain with a Prince-like funk, and boasts lyrics like, 'Oo, baby, I'm a fool for you' – not the doings of a gothy navel-gazer." It was nominated for the Kerrang! Award for Best Single in 2006. In October 2011, NME named it the 74th-best track of the preceding 15 years. In 2026, Rolling Stone named "Supermassive Black Hole" the 51st-greatest rock song of the 21st century so far.

== Usage in media ==
The song featured in the FIFA 07 soundtrack. On 8 May 2008, the song was released as downloadable content for the rhythm game Guitar Hero III: Legends of Rock on the PlayStation 3 and Xbox 360, along with "Stockholm Syndrome" and "Exo-Politics". It was featured at the beginning of the Series 6 Doctor Who episode "The Rebel Flesh", and was used as a wake-up for Space Shuttle Atlantis astronauts on the vessel's presumed final day in space, 26 May 2010. The song is available to play on Rocksmith 2014 as part of a 5-song Muse pack. Black Mirror featured the song in the episode "Mazey Day". The song was also featured heavily during a scene in Twilight, where it plays over the Cullens engaging in an intense familial game of baseball (as well as a scene from What We Do in the Shadows that pays homage to the Twilight scene). The song was featured in The Sopranos episode "Walk Like a Man".

== Track listings ==
All tracks are written by Matt Bellamy.

CD and 7-inch single (HEL3001CD; HEL3001)
No.	Title	Length
1.	"Supermassive Black Hole"	3:29
2.	"Crying Shame"	2:38
Total length:		6:07

DVD single (HEL3001DVD)
No.	Title	Length
1.	"Supermassive Black Hole" (video)	3:29
2.	"Supermassive Black Hole" (audio)	3:29
3.	"Supermassive Black Hole" ("Making Of" the video)	12:04
4.	"Gallery"
Total length:		19:02

== Charts ==
=== Weekly charts ===
Weekly chart performance for "Supermassive Black Hole"
Chart (2006–2007)	Peak position
Australia (ARIA)	34
Belgium (Ultratip Bubbling Under Flanders)	13
Belgium (Ultratip Bubbling Under Wallonia)	13
Canada Rock (Billboard)	43
Denmark (Tracklisten)	7
Europe (Eurochart Hot 100)	8
Finland (Suomen virallinen lista)	10
France (SNEP)	51
Ireland (IRMA)	16
Italy (FIMI)	9
Netherlands (Single Top 100)	39
Scottish Singles Sales (Official Charts)	2
Switzerland (Schweizer Hitparade)	33
UK Singles (Official Charts)	4
UK Rock & Metal (Official Charts)	1
US Alternative Airplay (Billboard)	6

=== Year-end charts ===
2006 year-end chart performance for "Supermassive Black Hole"
Chart (2006)	Position
UK Singles (OCC)	84
Chart (2007)	Position
US Modern Rock Tracks (Billboard)	27

== Certifications and sales ==
Certifications and sales for "Supermassive Black Hole"
Region	Certification	Certified units/sales
Canada (Music Canada)	Gold	40,000^{*}
Denmark (IFPI Danmark)	Gold	45,000^{‡}
Germany (BVMI)	Gold	300,000^{‡}
Italy (FIMI)	Platinum	100,000^{‡}
New Zealand (RMNZ)	2× Platinum	60,000^{‡}
Spain (Promusicae)	Gold	30,000^{‡}
United Kingdom (BPI)	2× Platinum	1,200,000^{‡}
United States (RIAA)	Platinum	1,000,000^{‡}
^{*} Sales figures based on certification alone.^{‡} Sales+streaming figures based on certification alone.
