= Will of the People =

Will of the People may refer to:

- General will, a philosophical concept popularized by Jean-Jacques Rousseau
- Narodnaya Volya, or People's Will, the name of a number of populist movements in the Russian Empire
- People's Will (parliamentary group), Ukrainian parliamentary faction established in 2014
- Will of the People (album), the ninth studio album by English rock band Muse
  - "Will of the People" (song), from the album
  - Will of the People World Tour, concert tour promoting the album
- "Will of the People", song by Tim Pool

== See also ==
- Narodnaya Volya (disambiguation)
