= Will of the People World Tour =

2022–23 concert tour by Muse

- World tour by Muse
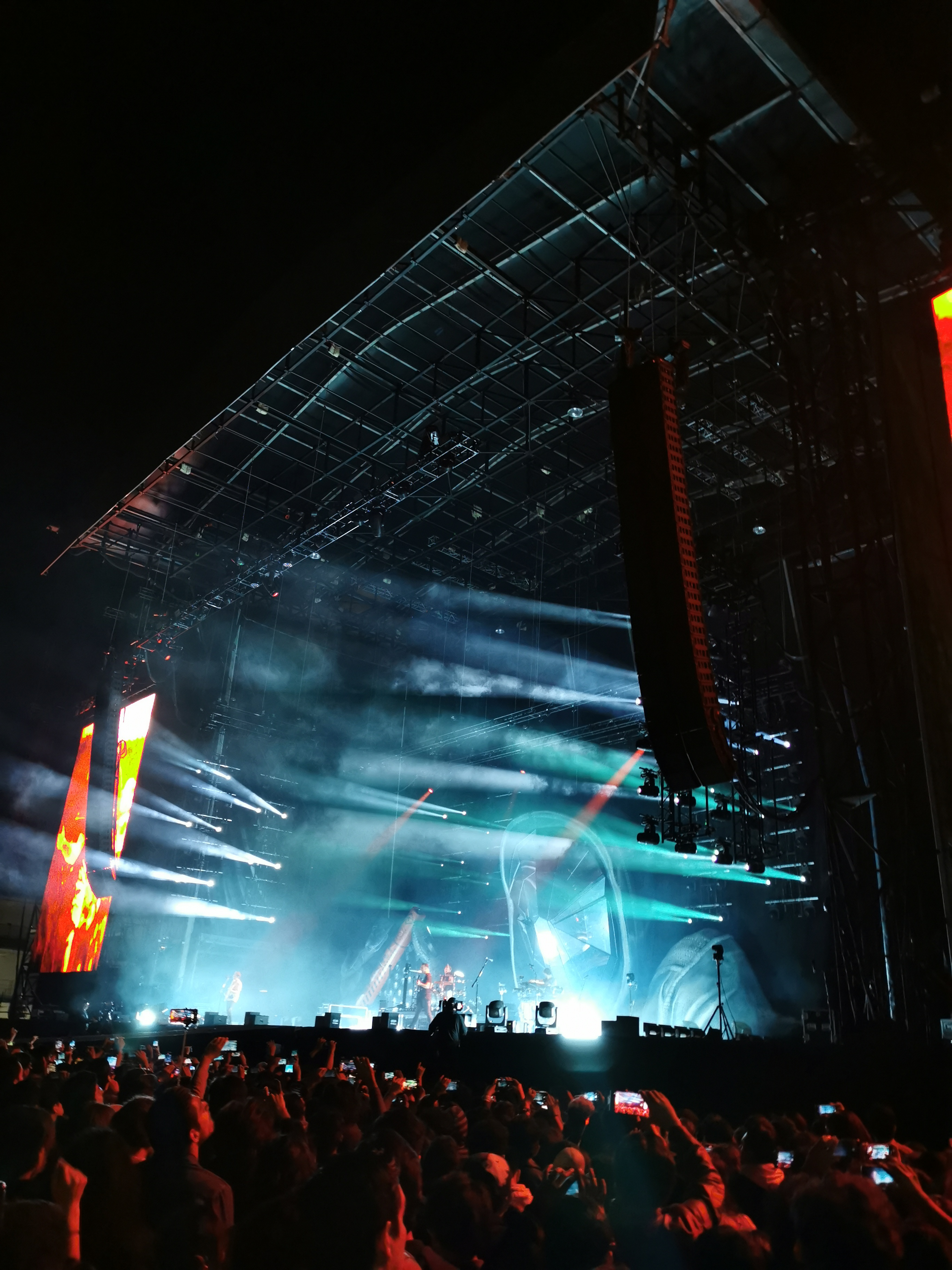
- A view from the concert at Foro Sol in Mexico City (23 January 2023)
- Associated album: Will of the People
- Start date: 7 April 2022
- End date: 4 November 2023
- Legs: 8
- No. of shows: 90
- Attendance: 1.07 million (49 shows)
- Box office: $99.15 million (49 shows)

Muse concert chronology
- Simulation Theory World Tour (2019); Will of the People World Tour (2022–23); The Wow! Signal Tour (2026)

The Will of the People World Tour was a world concert tour by English rock band Muse, in support of their ninth studio album, Will of the People (2022). The tour began in April 2022 and concluded in November 2023. The tour was Muse's first since the start of the COVID-19 pandemic, and is also the first to feature new touring member Dan Lancaster, who replaced long-time touring member Morgan Nicholls.

== Setlist ==
The following set list was obtained from the concert held on 26 February 2023 at Target Center in Minneapolis, United States. It does not represent all concerts for the duration of the tour.

1. "Will of the People" (extended intro)
2. "Hysteria" (with "Interlude" intro)
3. "Psycho" (with "Drill Sergeant" intro)
4. "Bliss"
5. "Won't Stand Down"
6. "Compliance"
7. "Thought Contagion"
8. "Verona"
9. "Time Is Running Out" (with "Interstitial 'Parkour'" intro)
10. "The 2nd Law: Isolated System" (shortened)
11. "Resistance"
12. "You Make Me Feel Like It's Halloween"
13. "Madness"
14. "We Are Fucking Fucked"
15. "The Dark Side" (Alternate Reality instrumental version)
16. "Supermassive Black Hole"
17. "Plug In Baby" (with "Interstitial 'Driving'" intro)
18. "Behold, the Glove" (Matt Bellamy song)
19. "Uprising"
20. "Starlight" (with "Prelude" intro)

Encore

21. "Kill or Be Killed" (with "Simulation Theory Theme / [JFK]" intro)
22. "Knights of Cydonia" (with "Man With A Harmonica" intro)

== Shows ==
List of 2022 concerts
Date	City	Country	Venue	Opening acts	Attendance	Revenue
7 April (Note: The concert in Exeter on 7 April 2022 was a secret invitation-only promotional warm-up concert ahead of the main tour.)	Exeter	England	Exeter Cavern Club	—N/a	150	—N/a
9 May (Note: The concert in London on 9 May 2022 was a charity concert to raise money for the victims of the 2022 Russian invasion of Ukraine.)	London	England	Eventim Apollo	—N/a	10,078	—N/a
10 May (Note: The concert in London on 10 May 2022 was a charity concert to raise money for The Big Issue.)	London	England	Eventim Apollo	Razorlight	10,078	—N/a
4 June (Note: The concert in Nürburg on 4 June 2022 was part of the Rock am Ring festival.)	Nürburg	Germany	Nürburgring	—N/a	—N/a	—N/a
5 June (Note: The concert in Nuremberg on 5 June 2022 was part of the Rock im Park festival.)	Nuremberg	Germany	Zeppelinfeld	—N/a	—N/a	—N/a
9 June (Note: The concert in Nickelsdorf on 9 June 2022 was part of the Nova Rock Festival.)	Nickelsdorf	Austria	Pannonia Fields II	—N/a	—N/a	—N/a
11 June (Note: The concert in Berlin on 11 June 2022 was part of the Tempelhof Sounds festival.)	Berlin	Germany	Tempelhof Airport	—N/a	—N/a	—N/a
17 June (Note: The concert in Florence on 9 June 2022 was part of the Firenze Rocks festival.)	Florence	Italy	Visarno Arena	—N/a	—N/a	—N/a
18 June (Note: The concert in Lisbon on 18 June 2022 was part of the Rock in Rio Lisboa festival.)	Lisbon	Portugal	Bela Vista Park	—N/a	—N/a	—N/a
19 June (Note: The concert in Newport on 19 June 2022 was part of the Isle of Wight Festival.)	Newport	England	Seaclose Park	—N/a	—N/a	—N/a
21 June (Note: The concert in Sopron on 21 June 2022 was part of the VOLT Festival.)	Sopron	Hungary	Löver Camping	—N/a	—N/a	—N/a
23 June (Note: The concert in Odense on 23 June 2022 was part of the Tinderbox Festival.)	Odense	Denmark	Tusindårsskoven	—N/a	—N/a	—N/a
26 June (Note: The concert in Calvià on 26 June 2022 was part of the Mallorca Live Festival.)	Calvià	Spain	Antiguo Aquapark	—N/a	—N/a	—N/a
29 June (Note: The concert in Athens on 29 June 2022 was part of the Ejekt Festival.)	Athens	Greece	Olympic Sports Complex	—N/a	—N/a	—N/a
2 July (Note: The concert in St. Gallen on 2 July 2022 was part of the Open Air St. Gallen festival.)	St. Gallen	Switzerland	Open Air St. Gallen	—N/a	—N/a	—N/a
3 July (Note: The concert in Belfort on 3 July 2022 was part of the Eurockéennes festival.)	Belfort	France	Lac de Malsaucy	—N/a	—N/a	—N/a
6 July (Note: The concert in Héroville-Saint-Claire on 6 July 2022 was part of the Festival Beauregard.)	Hérouville-Saint-Clair	France	Château de Beauregard	—N/a	—N/a	—N/a
8 July (Note: The concert in Madrid on 8 July 2022 was part of the Mad Cool festival.)	Madrid	Spain	Espacio Mad Cool	—N/a	—N/a	—N/a
10 July (Note: The concert in Céret on 10 July 2022 was part of the Les Déferlantes festival.)	Céret	France	Château d'Aubiry	—N/a	—N/a	—N/a
8 September (Note: The concert in Vigo on 8 September 2022 was part of the Ano Santo Xacobeo celebrations.)	Vigo	Spain	Balaídos	Years & Years; The Killer Barbies	17,000	—N/a
10 September (Note: The concert in Málaga on 10 September 2022 was part of the Andalucía Big Festival.)	Málaga	Spain	Recinto Ferial	—N/a	—N/a	—N/a
13 September (Note: The concert in Cologne on 13 September 2022 was part of the Telekom Street Gigs at Digital X)	Cologne	Germany	Media Park	—N/a	—N/a	—N/a
4 October	Los Angeles	United States	Wiltern Theatre	Tapei Houston	2,300	—N/a
8 October (Note: The concert in Clermont on 8 October 2022 was part of the Jim Beam Welcome Sessions.)	Clermont	United States	James B. Beam Distillery	—N/a	—N/a	—N/a
9 October (Note: The concert in Sacramento on 9 October 2022 was part of the Aftershock Festival.)	Sacramento	United States	Discovery Park	—N/a	—N/a	—N/a
11 October	Chicago	United States	Riviera Theatre	Brigitte Calls Me Baby	—N/a	—N/a
14 October	Toronto	Canada	History	Softcult	2,500	—N/a
16 October	New York City	United States	Beacon Theatre	Thick	2,894	—N/a
23 October	Amsterdam	Netherlands	Royal Theater Carré	Robin Kester	1,500	—N/a
25 October	Paris	France	Salle Pleyel	Bandit Bandit	2,500	—N/a
26 October	Milan	Italy	Alcatraz	Le Frequenze di Tesla	—N/a	—N/a
28 October	Berlin	Germany	Admiralspalast	—N/a	—N/a	—N/a
3 December (Note: The concert in Fort Lauderdale on 3 December 2022 was part of the Audacy Beach Festival.)	Fort Lauderdale	United States	Fort Lauderdale Beach	—N/a	—N/a	—N/a

List of 2023 concerts
Date	City	Country	Venue	Opening acts	Attendance	Revenue
18 January	Monterrey	Mexico	Estadio Banorte	The Warning	16,485 (80.15%)	$1,496,497
20 January	Guadalajara	Mexico	Arena VFG	The Warning	13,128 (100%)	$1,152,938
22 January	Mexico City	Mexico	Foro Sol	The Warning	107,270 (100%)	$6,764,113
23 January	Mexico City	Mexico	Foro Sol	The Warning	107,270 (100%)	$6,764,113
25 February	Chicago	United States	United Center	Evanescence; One Ok Rock	—N/a	—N/a
26 February	Minneapolis	United States	Target Center	Evanescence; One Ok Rock	—N/a	—N/a
28 February	Austin	United States	Moody Center	Evanescence; One Ok Rock	10,558 (100%)	$1,072,723
2 March	Houston	United States	Toyota Center	Evanescence; One Ok Rock	—N/a	—N/a
3 March	Fort Worth	United States	Dickies Arena	Evanescence; One Ok Rock	11,655 (100%)	$1,287,249
5 March	St. Louis	United States	Chaifetz Arena	Evanescence; One Ok Rock	6,662 (100%)	$584,000
7 March	Columbus	United States	Nationwide Arena	Evanescence; One Ok Rock	—N/a	—N/a
9 March	Toronto	Canada	Scotiabank Arena	Evanescence; One Ok Rock	—N/a	—N/a
11 March	Quebec City	Canada	Videotron Centre	Evanescence; One Ok Rock	—N/a	—N/a
12 March	Quebec City	Canada	Videotron Centre	Evanescence; One Ok Rock	—N/a	—N/a
14 March	Montreal	Canada	Bell Centre	Evanescence; One Ok Rock	—N/a	—N/a
15 March	Montreal	Canada	Bell Centre	Evanescence; One Ok Rock	—N/a	—N/a
17 March	New York City	United States	Madison Square Garden	Evanescence; One Ok Rock	13,099 (100%)	$1,414,150
19 March	Philadelphia	United States	Wells Fargo Center	Evanescence; One Ok Rock	—N/a	—N/a
2 April	Glendale	United States	Desert Diamond Arena	Evanescence; Highly Suspect	—N/a	—N/a
4 April	Denver	United States	Ball Arena	Evanescence; Highly Suspect	—N/a	—N/a
6 April	Los Angeles	United States	Crypto.com Arena	Evanescence; Highly Suspect	12,811 (100%)	$1,568,543
8 April	Las Vegas	United States	T-Mobile Arena	Evanescence; Highly Suspect	—N/a	—N/a
10 April	San Diego	United States	Pechanga Arena	Evanescence; Highly Suspect	9,664 (100%)	$942,000
12 April	Anaheim	United States	Honda Center	Evanescence; Highly Suspect	—N/a	—N/a
14 April	Oakland	United States	Oakland Arena	Evanescence; Highly Suspect	11,711 (100%)	$1,125,120
16 April	Portland	United States	Moda Center	Evanescence; Highly Suspect	—N/a	—N/a
18 April	Seattle	United States	Climate Pledge Arena	Evanescence; Highly Suspect	12,293 (100%)	$1,575,075
20 April	Salt Lake City	United States	Vivint Arena	Evanescence; Highly Suspect	—N/a	—N/a
6 May (Note: The concert in Atlanta on 6 May 2023 was part of the Shaky Knees Music Festival.)	Atlanta	United States	Central Park	—N/a	—N/a	—N/a
27 May	Plymouth	England	Home Park	Royal Blood; The Warning	—N/a	—N/a
1 June (Note: The concert in Aarhus on 1 June 2023 was part of the NorthSide Festival.)	Aarhus	Denmark	Ådalen	—N/a	—N/a	—N/a
3 June	Wiener Neustadt	Austria	Stadion Open Air	Royal Blood; One Ok Rock	—N/a	—N/a
7 June	The Hague	Netherlands	Malieveld	Royal Blood; One Ok Rock	67,000 (100%)	—N/a
9 June	Cologne	Germany	RheinEnergieStadion	Royal Blood; One Ok Rock	—N/a	—N/a
11 June (Note: The concert in Hradec Kralove on 11 June 2023 was part of the Rock for People festival.)	Hradec Králové	Czech Republic	Hradec Králové Airport	—N/a	—N/a	—N/a
15 June	Lyon	France	Groupama Stadium	Royal Blood; The Warning	—N/a	—N/a
17 June (Note: The concert in Scheeßel on 17 June 2023 was part of the Hurricane Festival.)	Scheeßel	Germany	Eichenring	—N/a	—N/a	—N/a
18 June (Note: The concert in Neuhausen ob Eck on 18 June 2023 was part of the Southside Festival.)	Neuhausen ob Eck	Germany	Neuhausen ob Eck Airfield	—N/a	—N/a	—N/a
20 June	Huddersfield	England	John Smith's Stadium	Royal Blood; The Warning	—N/a	—N/a
23 June	Glasgow	Scotland	Bellahouston Park	Twin Atlantic; The Warning	—N/a	—N/a
25 June	Milton Keynes	England	National Bowl	Royal Blood; The Warning	—N/a	—N/a
29 June	Bordeaux	France	Matmut Atlantique	Royal Blood; One Ok Rock	—N/a	—N/a
1 July (Note: The concert in Werchter on 1 July 2023 was part of the Rock Werchter festival.)	Werchter	Belgium	Werchter Festivalpark	—N/a	—N/a	—N/a
4 July	Santander	Spain	Campos de Sport de El Sardinero	Royal Blood; One Ok Rock	23,000 (100%)	—N/a
6 July (Note: The concert in Nancy on 6 July 2023 was part of the Nancy Open Air festival.)	Nancy	France	Zénith de Nancy	One Ok Rock	—N/a	—N/a
8 July	Saint-Denis	France	Stade de France	Royal Blood; One Ok Rock	—N/a	—N/a
12 July	Bern	Switzerland	Areal OpenAir	Royal Blood; Emilie Zoé	—N/a	—N/a
15 July	Marseille	France	Orange Vélodrome	Royal Blood; One Ok Rock	—N/a	—N/a
18 July	Rome	Italy	Stadio Olimpico	Royal Blood; One Ok Rock	—N/a	—N/a
22 July	Milan	Italy	San Siro	Royal Blood; One Ok Rock	—N/a	—N/a
29 July	Kuala Lumpur	Malaysia	Bukit Jalil National Stadium	Kyoto Protocol	53,000	—N/a
27 September	Dublin	Ireland	3Arena	Nova Twins	—N/a	—N/a
29 September	Manchester	England	AO Arena	Nova Twins	—N/a	—N/a
1 October	London	England	The O_{2} Arena	Nova Twins	—N/a	—N/a
2 October	London	England	The O_{2} Arena	Nova Twins	—N/a	—N/a
4 November (Note: The concert in Toluca on 4 November 2023 was part of the Hell & Heaven Metal Fest.)	Toluca	Mexico	Foro Pegaso	—N/a	—N/a	—N/a

== Personnel ==
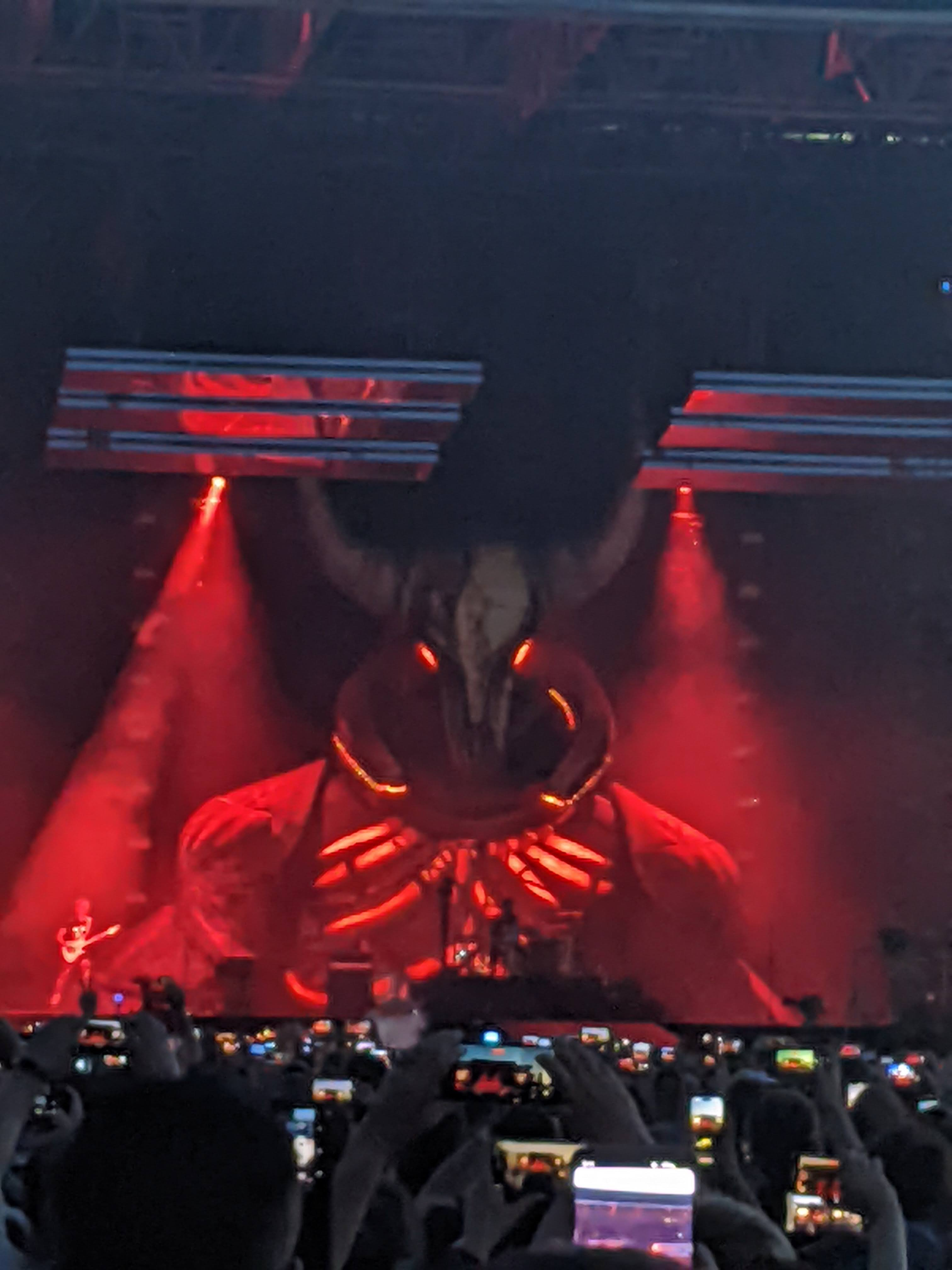
The Stage during the Encore

=== Muse ===
- Matt Bellamy – lead vocals, guitars, piano, synthesizers
- Chris Wolstenholme – bass, backing vocals, harmonica
- Dominic Howard – drums, acoustic and electronic percussion, backing vocals on "Supermassive Black Hole"

=== Additional musicians ===
- Dan Lancaster – keyboards, synthesizers, guitar, electronic percussion, backing vocals

=== Crew ===
- Metaform Studio – creative direction
- Sooner Routhier – lighting design, lighting programming
- Aaron D. Luke – associate lighting designer, lighting director, programmer
