= UK charts =

UK charts may refer to

- UK Albums Chart
- UK Dance Chart
- UK Official Download Chart
- UK R&B Chart
- UK Rock Chart
- UK Singles Chart records
- UK Classical Chart
- UK Indie Chart
- UK Music Charts
- UK Progressive Albums Chart
- UK Singles Chart
