= Ghosts (How Can I Move On) =

- Remix with Elisa cover

Single by Muse featuring Elisa

from the album Will of the People
- Released: 25 November 2022
- Genre: Pop
- Length: 3:37
- Label: Warner; Helium-3
- Songwriter: Matt Bellamy
- Producer: Muse

Muse singles chronology
"You Make Me Feel Like It's Halloween" (2022)	"Ghosts (How Can I Move On)" (2022)	"Unravelling" (2025)

Elisa singles chronology
"Palla al centro" (2022)	"Ghosts (How Can I Move On)" (2022)	"Come te nessuno mai" (2022)

Music video
- "Ghosts (How Can I Move On)" (Visualiser) on YouTube "Ghosts (How Can I Move On)" (Featuring Elisa) on YouTube

"Ghosts (How Can I Move On)" is a song by English rock band Muse, featuring Italian singer Elisa Toffoli. It was released through Warner Records and Helium-3 on 25 November 2022 as the sixth and final single from Muse's ninth studio album Will of the People, and was sent to Italian radio on the same day. On 9 December 2022, a second duet with French singer Mylène Farmer was released for French radio.

== Background and recording ==
The original album song was written and composed by Matt Bellamy as a solo piano ballad, and produced by himself with fellow band members Chris Wolstenholme and Dominic Howard. Bellamy explained the meaning of the song and its composition:

"That one is an unusual one for us. I was surprised that Dom and Chris even wanted that on the album. During the pandemic, I did a couple things on my own, just on the piano, acoustic. This song was in my mind in that world: me on the piano, singing alone. It really is a direct expression of that loneliness, and also the tragedy of what was happening for so many people"

On November 25, 2022, coinciding with the release of the original single, a second version of the song was released in collaboration with Italian singer-songwriter Elisa, who wrote the second verse in Italian. Taliking about Elisa's involvement on the record, Bellamy explained: "We always thought this song would be perfect for a powerful female voice. We are thrilled that Elisa is the first in a series of future collaborations that our fans will hear." Elisa described the collaboration as "stimulating", as it represents a "beautiful intertwining of my personal history with them and the great artistic value of the band, made up of exceptional performers".

== Charts ==
Chart performance for "Ghosts (How Can I Move On)" (with Elisa)
Chart (2022)	Peak position
Italy (EarOne Airplay)	26

== Release history ==
Region	Date	Format(s)	Version	Label(s)	Ref.
Various	November 25, 2022	Digital download; streaming	Original	Warner; Helium-3	
Various	November 25, 2022	Digital download; streaming	Collaboration with Elisa	Warner; Helium-3	
Italy	November 25, 2022	Radio airplay	Collaboration with Elisa	Warner	
France	December 9, 2022	Radio airplay	Collaboration with Mylène Farmer	Warner	
