= Kill or Be Killed (song) =

- Cover of the Felsmann + Tiley reinterpretation

Single by Muse

from the album Will of the People
- Released: 21 July 2022
- Genre: Progressive metal; heavy metal; alternative metal; metalcore; arena rock
- Length: 5:00
- Label: Warner
- Songwriter: Matt Bellamy
- Producer: Muse

Muse singles chronology
"Will of the People" (2022)	"Kill or Be Killed" (2022)	"You Make Me Feel Like It's Halloween" (2022)

Music video
- "Kill or Be Killed" on YouTube

"Kill or Be Killed" is a song by the English rock band Muse. It was released on 21 July 2022 as the fourth single ahead of their ninth studio album Will of the People, having already debuted in live format during festival shows of their Will of the People World Tour. It was nominated for Best Metal Performance at the 65th Annual Grammy Awards.

== Release history ==
"Kill or Be Killed" was debuted in live format at the 4 June 2022 show of the Will of the People World Tour, at the Rock am Ring music festival in Germany, during which the previous single "Will of the People" also received its live debut. "Kill or Be Killed" was played as the first song of the encore, before the closing song "Knights of Cydonia", and without any official prior announcement from the band.

"Kill or Be Killed" was subsequently played at every following show of the tour, emerging as a fan favourite. On 14 July, Muse confirmed through social media that "Kill or Be Killed" would be released as the fourth single ahead of Will of the People one week later on 21 July 2022, with a thirty-second snippet of the studio version of the song becoming available to preview through TikTok later that day.

A synthwave remix version by anonyomous German production duo Felsmann + Tiley, "Kill Or Be Killed [Felsmann + Tiley Reinterpretation]", was released as a digital single on 10 February 2023. The remix has subsequently been performed live in lieu of the original version on tours including the 2026 European tour for The Wow! Signal album, where the live vocals for the remix were provided by Ameca the Robot.

== Writing and composition ==
Prior to the live debut of "Kill or Be Killed", in an interview with Apple Music 1 on 17 March 2022, Matt Bellamy described "Kill or Be Killed" as "the best metal/prog track we've ever done", featuring "industrial-tinged, granite-heavy guitar riffs". Music journalists described "Kill or Be Killed" as progressive metal, heavy metal, alternative metal, metalcore, and arena rock

For the guitar solo, Bellamy combined a tapping technique with a DigiTech Whammy, a pitch-shifting pedal, to shift rapidly between octaves. He said, "I'm plainly cheating in that solo ... It sounds like I’m doing insane arpeggios. I'm not a shredder at all. I've never been a very good shredder, but I found ways to cut corners."

== Charts ==
Chart performance for "Kill or Be Killed"
Chart (2022)	Peak position
UK Singles Sales (OCC)	81
UK Singles Downloads (Official Charts)	80
UK Rock & Metal (Official Charts)	20
US Rock Airplay (Billboard)	37
