= Will of the People (song) =

Single by Muse

from the album Will of the People
- Released: 1 June 2022
- Recorded: 2022
- Genre: Glam rock
- Length: 3:19
- Label: Warner
- Songwriter: Matt Bellamy
- Producer: Muse

Muse singles chronology
"Compliance" (2022)	"Will of the People" (2022)	"Kill or Be Killed" (2022)

Music video
- "Will of the People" on YouTube

"Will of the People" is a song by English rock band Muse. The title track from their ninth studio album Will of the People, it was released as its third single from the album on 1 June 2022.

== Release ==
"Will of the People" was first announced as the opening song on the track listing for Muse's upcoming ninth studio album, also named Will of the People, through the band's social media channels on 4 April 2022. On 27 May, "Will of the People" was announced through the band's social media channels as the third single to be released from the album, with a release date of 1 June.

Upon its release on 1 June 2022, "Will of the People" was accompanied on social media channels with a quote explaining the backstory of the song and music video, which read as follows:

WOTP is a fictional story set in a fictional metaverse on a fictional planet ruled by a fictional authoritarian state run by a fictional algorithm manifested by a fictional data centre running a fictional bank printing a fictional currency controlling a fictional population occupying a fictional city containing a fictional apartment where a fictional man woke up one day and thought "fuck this".

On the same day as the release of the single, Muse announced a series of seven intimate concerts in small venues across Europe and North America in October 2022, ahead of the Will of the People World Tour.

== Writing and composition ==
"Will of the People" has been described as an "anthemic" glam rock song, also featuring traits of progressive rock. Rhythmically, the song has been compared to "The Beautiful People" by Marilyn Manson and "Summertime Blues" by Eddie Cochran. In a direct lift of the hook from "The Beautiful People", a crowd repeatedly chants "the will of the people" throughout the track, forming both the song's bridge and the backing vocals to the choruses.

Lyrically, the song is an anti-establishment protest song, similarly to previous Muse single "Compliance"; however, in contrast to the gaslighting nature of the previous single attempting to convince the listener that the oppressor is the one in the right, the lyrics of "Will of the People" are from the perspective of the victim, calling for direct action to be taken against the oppressor. The song is intended to be a "populist parody, almost the antithesis to 'Uprising'," another Muse song with a similar anti-establishment theme that instead "[takes] it seriously."

== Music video ==
The music video for "Will of the People" was released on 1 June 2022 at 15:00 BST (UTC+1), the same day as the single was released. The music video for "Will of the People" follows on from the videos for previous singles "Won't Stand Down" and "Compliance", continuing the same themes and following the same characters.

The video, directed and animated by Tom Teller, is set in a dystopian city in which a revolution takes place. The video opens with a person receiving a delivery of a metallic mask, the same as the mask featured in the "Won't Stand Down" and "Compliance" music videos; he is later revealed to be Will the Hacker, the leader of the revolution. As the video progresses, a growing number of revolutionaries advance through the city, destroying security cameras, spraying "Will of the People" logo graffiti onto walls, tearing down statues and attacking the building belonging to the Ministry of Truth, in reference to George Orwell's dystopian novel Nineteen Eighty-Four.

As the Ministry of Truth building explodes and continues to burn, the city's electricity supply and mobile phone signals are shut down in an attempt to smother the revolution. The leaders of the revolution depart the city in futuristic supercars, resembling Tesla Cybertrucks, heading into the desert as the skyline of the city burns behind them. In the desert the revolutionaries find three ancient statues of the faces of band members Matt Bellamy, Dominic Howard and Chris Wolstenholme carved in the style of Mount Rushmore; they are destroyed by being pulled to the ground with cables, before being covered in "Will of the People" logo graffiti. Three members take off their masks, revealing themselves as the members of Muse.

The music video for "Will of the People" references multiple forms of popular culture; as well as Orwell's Nineteen Eighty-Four, the video has been compared to "V for Vendetta set in [the] Blade Runner 2049 universe".

== Personnel ==
Credits adapted from Tidal.

Muse

- Matt Bellamy – lead vocals, guitars, composition, production, engineering
- Chris Wolstenholme – bass guitar, engineering
- Dominic Howard – drums, engineering

Production

- Aleks Von Korff – additional production, engineering
- Chris Gehringer – mastering
- Serban Ghenea – mixing
- Bryce Bordone – mixing engineer
- Andy Maxwell – studio assistant
- Joe Devenney – studio assistant
- Tommy Bosustow – studio assistant
- Chris Whitemyer – technical assistant
- Paul Warren – technical assistant

== Charts ==
Chart performance for "Will of the People"
Chart (2022)	Peak position
Canada Rock (Billboard)	44
Czech Republic Rock (IFPI)	12
Japan Hot Overseas (Billboard)	19
New Zealand Hot Singles (RMNZ)	25
UK Singles Sales (OCC)	96
UK Singles Downloads (OCC)	93
UK Rock & Metal (Official Charts)	11
US Mainstream Rock (Billboard)	23
