= Official Progressive Albums Chart =

Monthly album chart for progressive music sales

The Official Progressive Albums Chart is a monthly album chart for progressive music sales compiled by the Official Charts Company and launched in September 2015. The first album to top the chart was Currents by Tame Impala.

== Number ones ==
Key
No.	nth album to top the Official Progressive Albums Chart
re	Return of an album to number one

No.	Artist	Album	Record label	Reached number one	Months at number one	Ref.
2015
1	Tame Impala	Currents	Fiction	September 2015	1	
2	Muse	Drones	Warner Bros.	October 2015	1	
3	David Gilmour	Rattle That Lock	Columbia	November 2015	1	
4	Jeff Lynne's ELO	Alone in the Universe	Columbia	December 2015	3	
2016
re	Tame Impala	Currents	Fiction	April 2016	1	
re	Muse	Drones	Warner Bros.	May 2016	1	
5	Radiohead	A Moon Shaped Pool	XL Recordings	June 2016	7	
2017
6	Kate Bush	Before the Dawn	Fish People	January 2017	2	
7	Rick Wakeman	Piano Portraits	UMC	March 2017	2	
8	Mike and the Mechanics	Let Me Fly	BMG	May 2017	1	
9	Hawkwind	Into the Woods	Cherry Red	June 2017	1	
10	Radiohead	OK Computer	XL Recordings	August 2017	2	
11	Steven Wilson	To the Bone	Caroline	October 2017	1	
12	David Gilmour	Live at Pompeii	Columbia	November 2017	1	
13	Jeff Lynne's ELO	Wembley or Bust	RCA	December 2017	3	
2018
14	Jethro Tull	Heavy Horses	Rhino	April 2018	1	
re	Radiohead	OK Computer	XL Recordings	May 2018	1	
15	A Perfect Circle	Eat the Elephant	BMG	June 2018	1	
16	Wooden Shjips	V	Thrill Jockey	July 2018	1	
17	Roger Waters	Is This the Life We Really Want?	Columbia	August 2018	1	
re	Tame Impala	Currents	Fiction	September 2018	1	
18	Spiritualized	And Nothing Hurt	Bella Union	October 2018	1	
19	Rick Wakeman	Piano Odyssey	Sony Classical	November 2018	1	
20	Muse	Simulation Theory	Helium 3/Warner Bros	December 2018	2	
2019
21	Within Temptation	Resist	Spinefarm	March 2019	1	
22	Dream Theater	Distance over Time	Century Media	April 2019	1	
23	Kate Bush	The Other Sides	Rhino	May 2019	1	
24	Mike and the Mechanics	Out of the Blue	BMG	June 2019	1	
re	Muse	Simulation Theory	Helium 3/Warner Bros	July 2019	2	
25	Brian Eno	Apollo: Atmospheres and Soundtracks	UMC	September 2019	1	
26	Opeth	In Cauda Venenum	Nuclear Blast	October 2019	1	
27	Jeff Lynne's ELO	From Out of Nowhere	RCA	November 2019	3	
2020
28	Pink Floyd	The Later Years 1987–2019	Rhino	March 2020	1	
29	Tame Impala	The Slow Rush	Fiction	April 2020	2	
30	Nightwish	Human. :II: Nature.	Nuclear Blast	June 2020	1	
31	Rush	Permanent Waves	Mercury/UMC	July 2020	1	
re	Pink Floyd	The Later Years 1987–2019	Rhino	August 2020	2	
32	The Flaming Lips	American Head	Bella Union	October 2020	1	
re	Tame Impala	The Slow Rush	Fiction	November 2020	3	
2021
33	Steven Wilson	The Future Bites	SW Records	March 2021	1	
34	Mogwai	As the Love Continues	Rock Action	April 2021	1	
35	Jean-Michel Jarre	Amazônia	RCA	May 2021	1	
36	Matt Berry	The Blue Elephant	Acid Jazz	July 2021	1	
37	Mogwai	ZeroZeroZero	Rock Action	August 2021	1	
38	Big Big Train	Common Ground	English Electric	September 2021	1	
39	Marillion	Fugazi	Parlophone	October 2021	1	
40	Yes	The Quest	Inside Out	November 2021	1	
41	Radiohead	Kid A Mnesia	XL Recordings	December 2021	2	
2022
42	Jethro Tull	The Zealot Gene	Inside Out	March 2022	1	
43	Marillion	An Hour Before It's Dark	earMUSIC	April 2022	1	
44	Spiritualized	Everything Was Beautiful	Bella Union	May 2022	1	
45	10cc	The Things We Do for Love - The Ultimate	Xploded Music	July 2022	1	
46	Porcupine Tree	Closure/Continuation	Music for Nations	August 2022	1	
47	Muse	Will of the People	Warner Records	September 2022	2	
48	Pink Floyd	Animals	Rhino	November 2022	1	
re	Muse	Will of the People	Warner Records	December 2022	2	
2023
49	Riverside	ID.Entity	Inside Out	March 2023	1	
re	Muse	Will of the People	Warner Records	April 2023	1	
50	The Zombies	Different Game	Cooking Vinyl	May 2023	1	
51	Yes	Mirror to the Sky	Century Media	June 2023	1	
re	Muse	Will of the People	Warner Records	August 2023	2	
52	Public Service Broadcasting	This New Noise	Test Card	October 2023	1	
53	Steven Wilson	The Harmony Codex	SW Records	November 2023	2	
2024
54	Peter Gabriel	i/o	Real World	February 2024	2	
55	Steve Hackett	The Circus and the Nightwhale	Inside Out	April 2024	1	
56	Hawkwind	Stories from Time and Space	Cherry Red	May 2024	1	
re	Peter Gabriel	i/o	Real World	June 2024	1	
57	Alcest	Les Chants de l'Aurore	Nuclear Blast	August 2024	1	
58	Brian Eno	Eno - OST	Universal Music Recordings	September 2024	1	
59	David Gilmour	Luck and Strange	Sony	October 2024	2	
2025
60	Sleep Token	Take Me Back to Eden	Spinefarm	February 2025	1	
61	Mogwai	The Bad Fire	Rock Action	March 2025	1	
re	Sleep Token	Take Me Back to Eden	Spinefarm	April 2025	2	
62	Sleep Token	Even in Arcadia	RCA	June 2025	3	
