= Narodnaya Volya (disambiguation) =

Narodnaya Volya was a radical organization in Tsarist Russia.

Narodnaya Volya may also refer to:

- Narodnaja Volya (newspaper), recent Belarusian newspaper
- People's Union (Russia), also known as the Party of National Revival "Narodnaya Volya"

== See also ==
- Will of the People (disambiguation)
