= Muse (band) =

English rock band

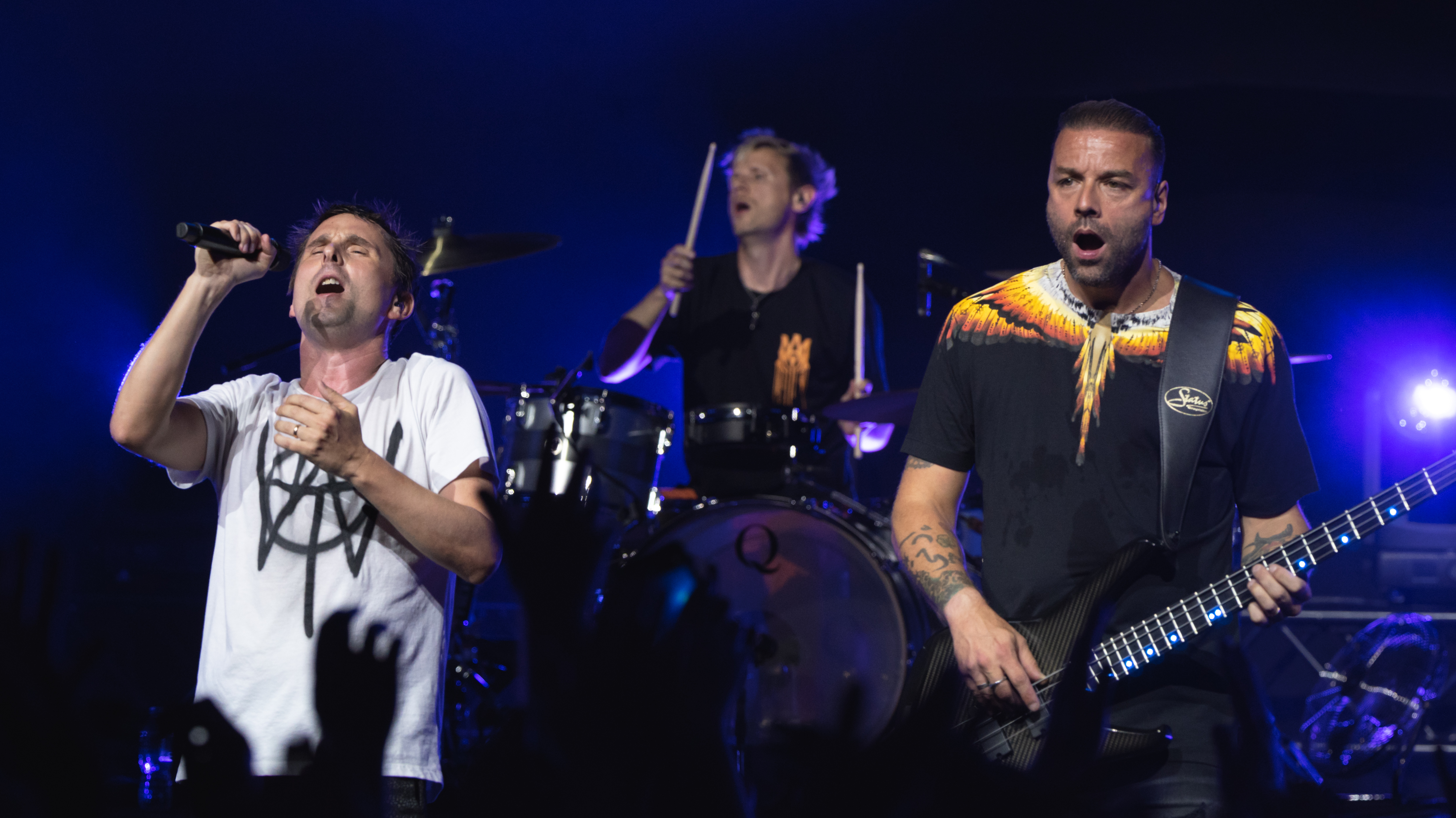
- Muse performing in 2022. From left to right: Matt Bellamy, Dominic Howard, Chris Wolstenholme

Background information
- Origin: Teignmouth, Devon, England
- Genres: Alternative rock; progressive rock; space rock; hard rock; art rock; electronic rock
- Works: Discography; songs
- Years active: 1994–present
- Labels: Helium 3; Warner; Taste; Dangerous
- Spinoffs: The Jaded Hearts Club
- Members: Matt Bellamy; Dominic Howard; Chris Wolstenholme
- Website: muse.mu
- Logo

Muse are an English rock band from Teignmouth, Devon, formed in 1994. The band consists of Matt Bellamy (lead vocals, guitar, keyboards), Chris Wolstenholme (bass guitar, backing vocals), and Dominic Howard (drums, percussion).

Muse released their debut album, Showbiz, in 1999, showcasing Bellamy's falsetto and a melancholic alternative rock style. Their second album, Origin of Symmetry (2001), incorporated wider instrumentation and romantic classical influences and earned them a reputation for energetic live performances. Absolution (2003) saw further classical influence, with strings on tracks such as "Butterflies and Hurricanes", and was the first of eight consecutive UK number-one albums.

Black Holes and Revelations (2006) incorporated electronic and pop elements, displayed in singles such as "Supermassive Black Hole", and brought Muse wider international success. The Resistance (2009) and The 2nd Law (2012) explored themes of government oppression and civil uprising and cemented Muse as one of the world's major stadium acts. Topping the US Billboard 200, their seventh album, Drones (2015), was a concept album about drone warfare and returned to a harder rock sound. Their eighth album, Simulation Theory (2018), prominently featured synthesisers and was influenced by science fiction and the simulation hypothesis. Their ninth album, Will of the People (2022), combined many genres and themes from their previous albums. Their tenth album, The Wow! Signal (2026), was influenced by space, the possibility of extraterrestrial life, and Bellamy's split from his wife.

Muse have won numerous awards, including two Grammy Awards, two Brit Awards, five MTV Europe Music Awards and eight NME Awards. In 2012, they received the Ivor Novello Award for International Achievement from the British Academy of Songwriters, Composers and Authors. As of 2022, they had sold more than 30 million albums worldwide.

== History ==
=== 1994–1997: Early years ===
The members of Muse played in separate school bands during their time at Teignmouth Community College in the early 1990s. Guitarist Matt Bellamy successfully auditioned for drummer Dominic Howard's band, Carnage Mayhem, becoming its singer and songwriter. They renamed the band Gothic Plague. They asked Chris Wolstenholme – at that time the drummer for Fixed Penalty – to join as bassist; he agreed and took up bass lessons. The band was renamed Rocket Baby Dolls and adopted a goth-glam image. Around this time, they received a £150 grant from the Prince's Trust for equipment.

In 1994, Rocket Baby Dolls won a local battle of the bands, smashing their equipment in the process. Bellamy said, "It was supposed to be a protest, a statement, so, when we actually won, it was a real shock, a massive shock. After that, we started taking ourselves seriously." The band quit their jobs, changed their name to Muse, and moved away from Teignmouth. The band liked that the new name was short and thought that it looked good on a poster. According to journalist Mark Beaumont, the band wanted the name to reflect "the sense Matt had that he had somehow 'summoned up' this band, the way mediums could summon up inspirational spirits at times of emotional need".

=== 1998–2002: Showbiz and Origin of Symmetry ===
After a few years building a fanbase, Muse played their first gigs in London and Manchester supporting Skunk Anansie on tour. They had a significant meeting with Dennis Smith, the owner of Sawmills Studio, situated in a converted water mill in Cornwall. He had seen the three boys grow up as he knew their parents, and had a production company with their future manager Safta Jaffery, with whom he had recently started the record label Taste Media. The meeting led to their first serious recordings and the release of the Muse EP on 11 May 1998 on Sawmills' in-house Dangerous label, produced by Paul Reeve. Their second EP, the Muscle Museum EP, also produced by Reeve, was released on 11 January 1999. It reached number 3 in the indie singles chart and attracted the attention of the radio broadcaster Steve Lamacq and the magazine NME.

Later in 1999, Muse performed on the Emerging Artist's stage at Woodstock '99 and signed with Smith and Jaffery. Despite the success of their second EP, British record companies were reluctant to sign Muse. After a trip to New York's CMJ Festival, Nanci Walker, then Sr. Director of A&R at Columbia Records, flew Muse to the US to showcase for Columbia Records' then-Senior Vice-president of A&R, Tim Devine, as well as for American Recording's Rick Rubin. During this trip, on 24 December 1998, Muse signed a deal with American record label Maverick Records. Upon their return to England, Taste Media arranged deals for Muse with various record labels in Europe and Australia, allowing them control over their career in individual countries. John Leckie was brought in alongside Reeve to produce the band's first album, Showbiz (1999). The album showcased Muse's aggressive yet melancholic musical style, with lyrics about relationships and their difficulties trying to establish themselves in their hometown.

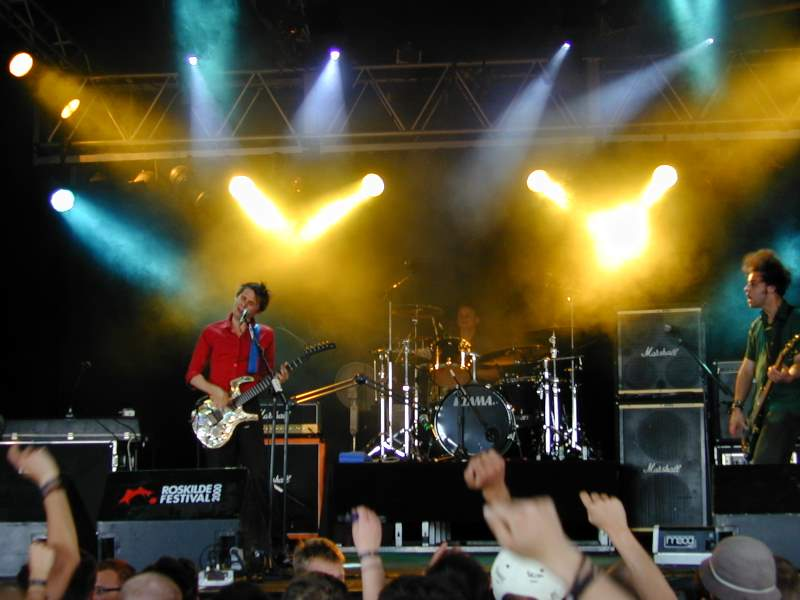
Muse performing at Roskilde Festival in Denmark, July 2000

During the production of their second album, Origin of Symmetry (2001), Muse experimented with instrumentation such as a church organ, Mellotron, animal bones, and an expanded drum kit. There was more of Bellamy's falsetto, arpeggiated guitar, and piano playing. Bellamy cites guitar influences such as Jimi Hendrix and Tom Morello (of Rage Against the Machine), the latter evident in the more riff-based songs in Origin of Symmetry and in Bellamy's use of guitar pitch-shifting effects. The album features a cover of Anthony Newley and Leslie Bricusse's "Feeling Good", voted in various polls one of the greatest cover versions of all time. It was released as a double A-side single, "Hyper Music / Feeling Good".

Origin of Symmetry received positive reviews. NME gave it 9/10 and wrote: "It's amazing for such a young band to load up with a heritage that includes the darker visions of Cobain and Kafka, Mahler and the Tiger Lillies, Cronenberg and Schoenberg, and make a sexy, populist album." Maverick, Muse's American label, did not consider Bellamy's vocals "radio-friendly" and asked Muse to rerecord "Plug in Baby" for the US release. Muse refused and left Maverick. Origin of Symmetry was not released in the US until September 2005, after Muse signed to Warner Bros.

Origin of Symmetry has made appearances on lists of the greatest rock albums of the 2000s, both poll-based and on publication lists. In 2006, it placed at number 74 on Q magazine's list of the 100 Greatest Albums of All-Time, while in February 2008, the album placed at number 28 on a list of the Best British Albums of All Time determined by the magazine's readers. Kerrang! placed the album at number 20 in its 100 Best British Rock Albums Ever! List and at number 13 on its 50 Best Albums of the 21st Century list.

On 10 November 2001 the band appeared on BBC's Later... with Jools Holland and performed "Hyper Music" and "Feeling Good".

In 2002, Muse released the first live DVD, Hullabaloo, featuring footage recorded during Muse's two gigs at Le Zenith in Paris in 2001, and a documentary film of the band on tour. A double album, Hullabaloo Soundtrack, was released at the same time, containing a compilation of B-sides and a disc of recordings of songs from the Le Zenith performances. A double-A side single was also released featuring the new songs "In Your World" and "Dead Star".

In 2002, Muse threatened Celine Dion with legal action when she planned to name her Las Vegas show "Muse", as Muse had worldwide performing rights to the name. Muse refused an offer from Dion of $50,000 for the rights, as they feared it could harm their chances of breaking into the US market. Bellamy said: "We don't want to turn up there with people thinking we're Celine Dion's backing band."

=== 2003–2008: Absolution and Black Holes and Revelations ===
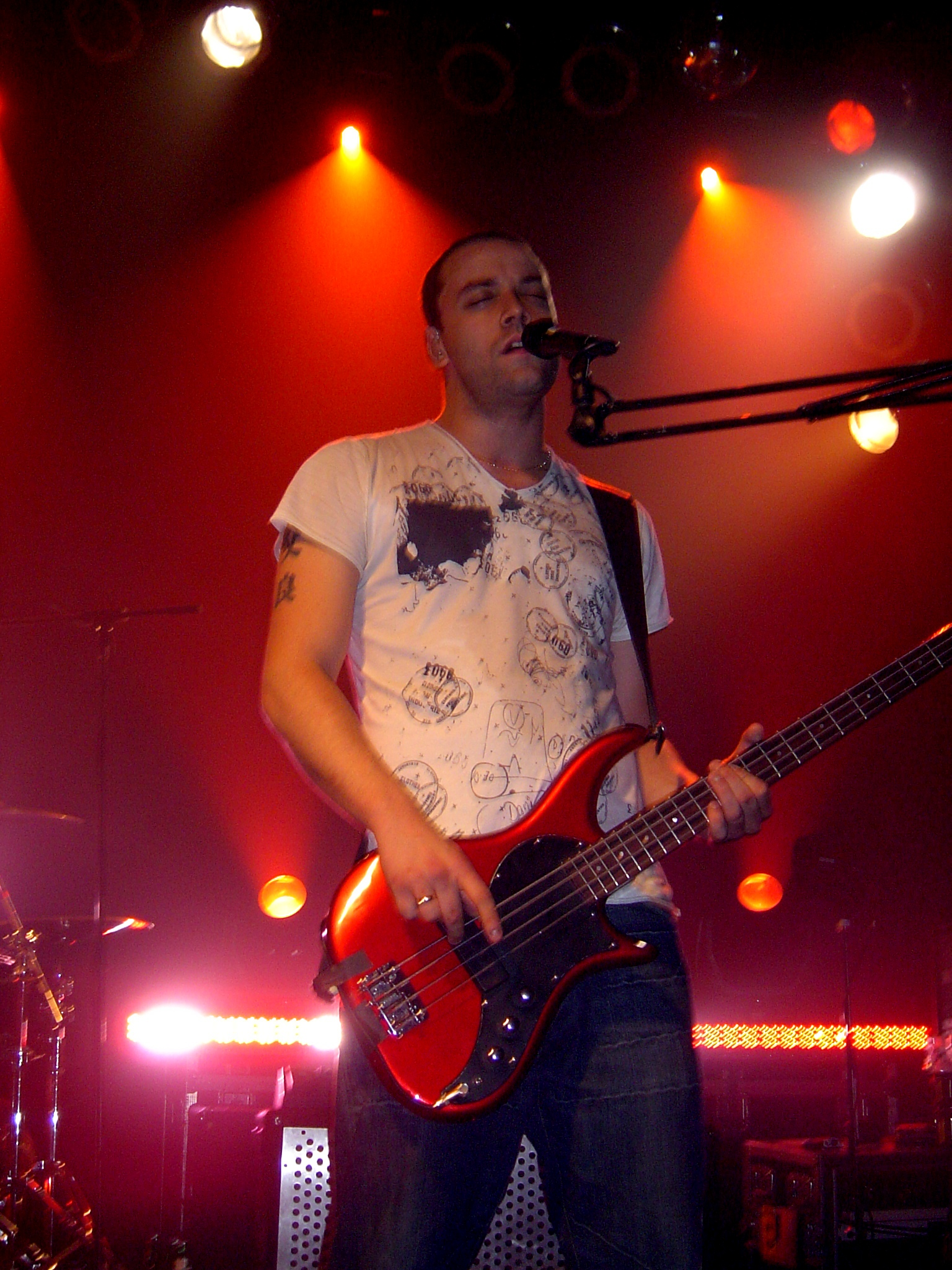
Wolstenholme performing at the Mod Club Theatre, Toronto in 2004. The international Absolution tour included the band's first shows in North America since 1999.

Muse's third album, Absolution, produced by Rich Costey, Paul Reeve and John Cornfield was released on 15 September 2003. It debuted at number one in the UK and produced Muse's first top-ten hit, "Time Is Running Out", and three top-twenty hits: "Hysteria", "Sing for Absolution" and "Butterflies and Hurricanes". Absolution was eventually certified gold in the US. Muse undertook a year-long international tour in support of the album, visiting Australia, New Zealand, the United States, Canada, and France. On the 2004 US leg of the tour, Bellamy injured himself onstage during the opening show in Atlanta; the tour resumed after Bellamy received stitches.

In June 2004, Muse headlined the Glastonbury Festival, which they later described as "the best gig of our lives". Howard's father, William Howard, who attended the festival to watch the band, died from a heart attack shortly after the performance. Bellamy said: "It was the biggest feeling of achievement we've ever had after coming offstage. It was almost surreal that an hour later his dad died. It was almost not believable. We spent about a week sort of just with Dom trying to support him. I think he was happy that at least his dad got to see him at probably what was the finest moment so far of the band's life."

Muse won two MTV Europe awards, including "Best Alternative Act", and a Q Award for "Best Live Act", and received an award for "Best British Live Act" at the Brit Awards. On 2 July 2005, they participated in the Live 8 concert in Paris. In 2003, the band successfully sued Nestlé for using their cover "Feeling Good" for a Nescafé advertisement without permission and donated the money won from the lawsuit to Oxfam. An unofficial DVD biography, Manic Depression, was released in April 2005.

Muse released another live DVD on 12 December 2005, Absolution Tour, containing edited and remastered highlights from their Glastonbury performance unseen footage from their performances at London Earls Court, Wembley Arena, and the Wiltern Theatre in Los Angeles.

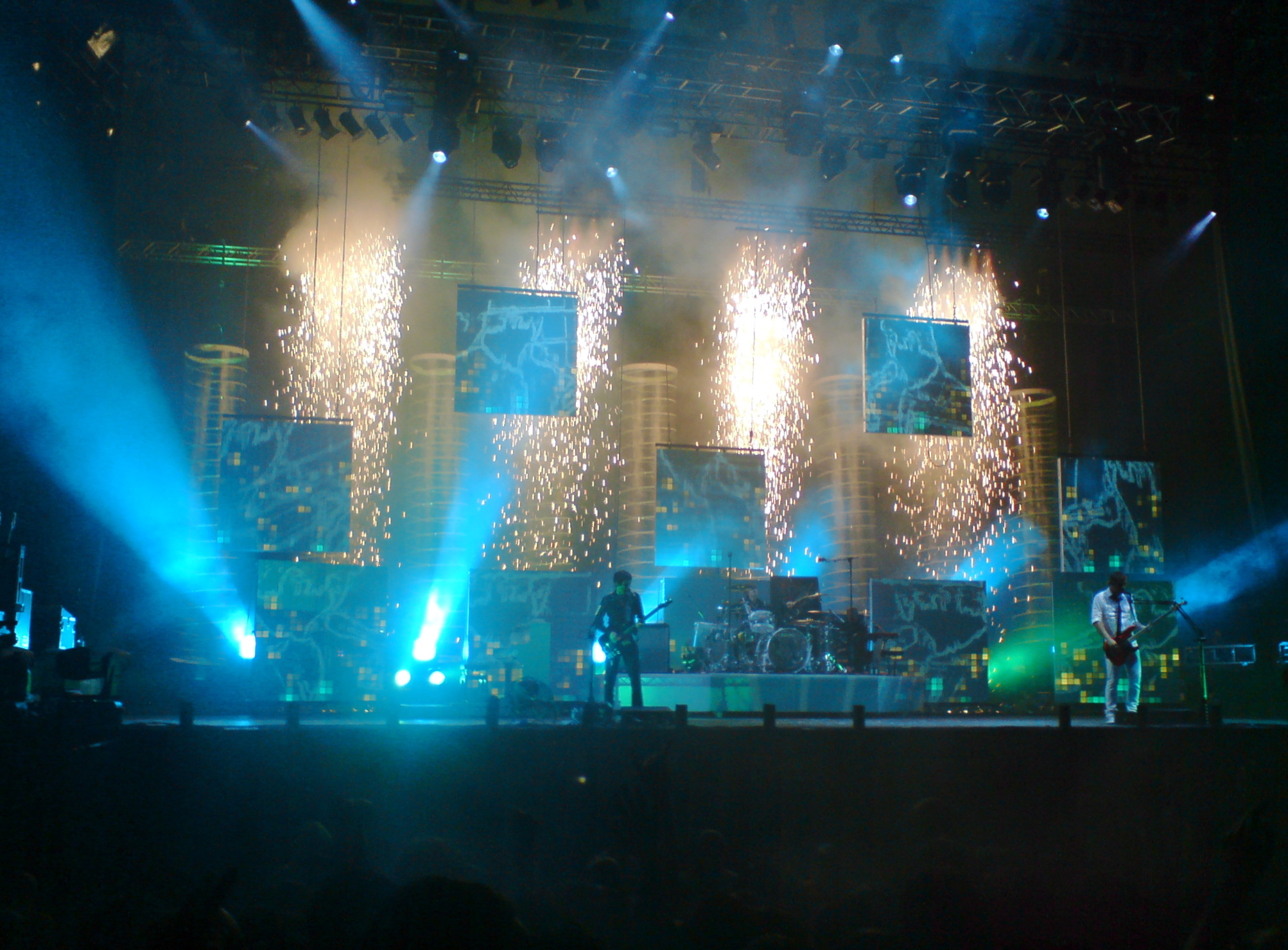
Muse playing "Starlight" at Reading and Leeds Festivals on 28 August 2006

In 2006, Muse released their fourth album, Black Holes and Revelations, co-produced once again with Rich Costey. The album's title and themes reflect the band's interest in science fiction. The album charted at number one in the UK, much of Europe, and Australia. In the US, it reached number nine on the Billboard 200.

Before the release of the new album, Muse made several promotional TV appearances starting on 13 May 2006 at BBC Radio 1's Big Weekend. The Black Holes and Revelations Tour started before the release of their album and initially consisted mostly of festival appearances, including a headline slot at the Reading and Leeds Festivals in August 2006. The band's main touring itinerary started with a tour of North America from late July to early August 2006. After the last of the summer festivals, a tour of Europe began, including a large arena tour of the UK. Muse recruited an additional touring member, Morgan Nicholls, on keyboards, percussion and guitar. He performed with them until 2022.

Black Holes and Revelations was nominated for the 2006 Mercury Music Prize, but lost to Arctic Monkeys. It earned a Platinum Europe Award after selling one million copies in Europe. The first single from the album, "Supermassive Black Hole", was released as a download in May 2006. In August 2006, Muse recorded a live session at Abbey Road Studios for the Live from Abbey Road television show. The second single, "Starlight", was released in September 2006. "Knights of Cydonia" was released in the US as a radio-only single in June 2006 and in the UK in November 2006. The fourth single, "Invincible", was released in April 2007. Another single, "Map of the Problematique", was released for download only in June 2007, following the band's performance at Wembley Stadium.

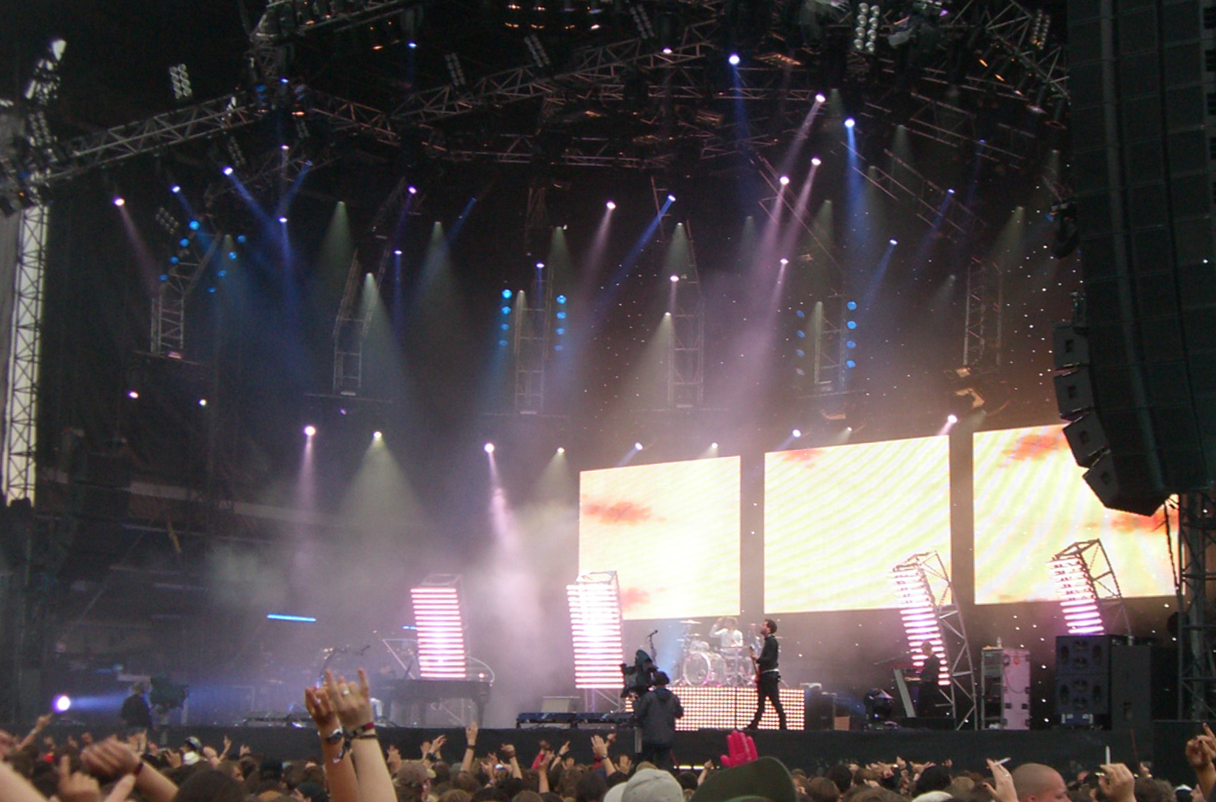
Muse at the Rock im Park, Germany in October 2007

Muse spent November and much of December 2006 touring Europe with British band Noisettes as the supporting act. The tour continued in Australia, New Zealand, and Southeast Asia in early 2007 before returning to England for the summer. At the 2007 Brit Awards in February, Muse received their second award for Best British Live Act. They became the first act to sell out the newly rebuilt Wembley Stadium when they performed two dates there in June 2007. Both concerts were recorded for a DVD/CD, HAARP, released in early 2008. In 2018, HAARP was named the 40th-greatest live album of all time by NME.

The tour continued across Europe in July 2007 before returning to the US in August, where Muse played to a sold-out crowd at Madison Square Garden, New York City. They headlined the second night of the Austin City Limits Music Festival on 15 September, and performed at the October Vegoose in Las Vegas with bands including Rage Against the Machine, Daft Punk and Queens of the Stone Age. Muse continued touring in Eastern Europe, Russia, Scandinavia, Australia, and New Zealand in 2007 before going to South Africa, Portugal, Mexico, Argentina, Chile, Colombia, Brazil, Ireland, and the UK in 2008. On 12 April, they played a concert at the Royal Albert Hall, London in aid of the Teenage Cancer Trust.

Muse performed at Rock in Rio Lisboa on 6 June 2008, alongside bands including Kaiser Chiefs, the Offspring and Linkin Park. They also performed in Marlay Park, Dublin, on 13 August. A few days later, Muse headlined the 2008 V Festival, playing in Chelmsford on Saturday 16 August and Staffordshire on Sunday 17 August. On 25 September, Bellamy, Howard and Wolstenholme received an Honorary Doctorate of Arts from the University of Plymouth for their contributions to music.

=== 2009–2013: The Resistance and The 2nd Law ===
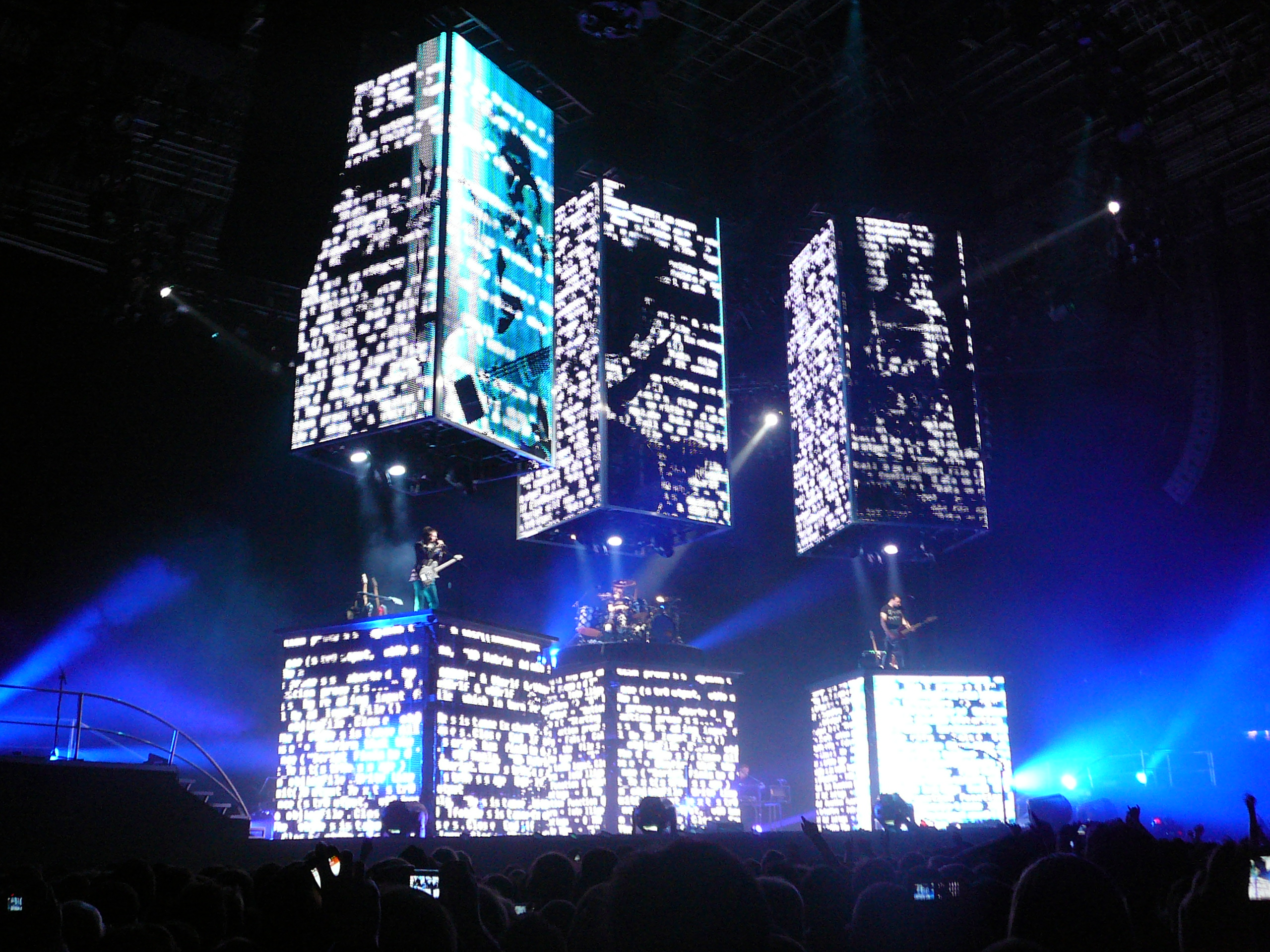
Muse performing "Resistance" at the National Indoor Arena, Birmingham, England on 10 November 2009.

During the recording of Muse's fifth studio album, The Resistance, Wolstenholme checked into rehab to deal with his alcoholism, which was threatening the band's future. Howard said: "I've always believed in band integrity and sticking together. There's something about the fact we all grew up together. We've been together for 18 years now, which is over half our lives."

The Resistance was released in September 2009, the first album produced by Muse, with engineering by Adrian Bushby and mixing by Mark Stent. It topped album charts in 19 countries, became the band's third number one album in the UK, and reached number three on the Billboard 200. Reviews were mostly positive, with praise for its ambition, classical influences and the three-part "Exogenesis: Symphony". The Resistance beat its predecessor Black Holes and Revelations in album sales in its debut week in the UK with approximately 148,000 copies sold. The first single, "Uprising", was released seven days earlier. On 13 September, Muse performed "Uprising" at the 2009 MTV Video Music Awards in New York City.

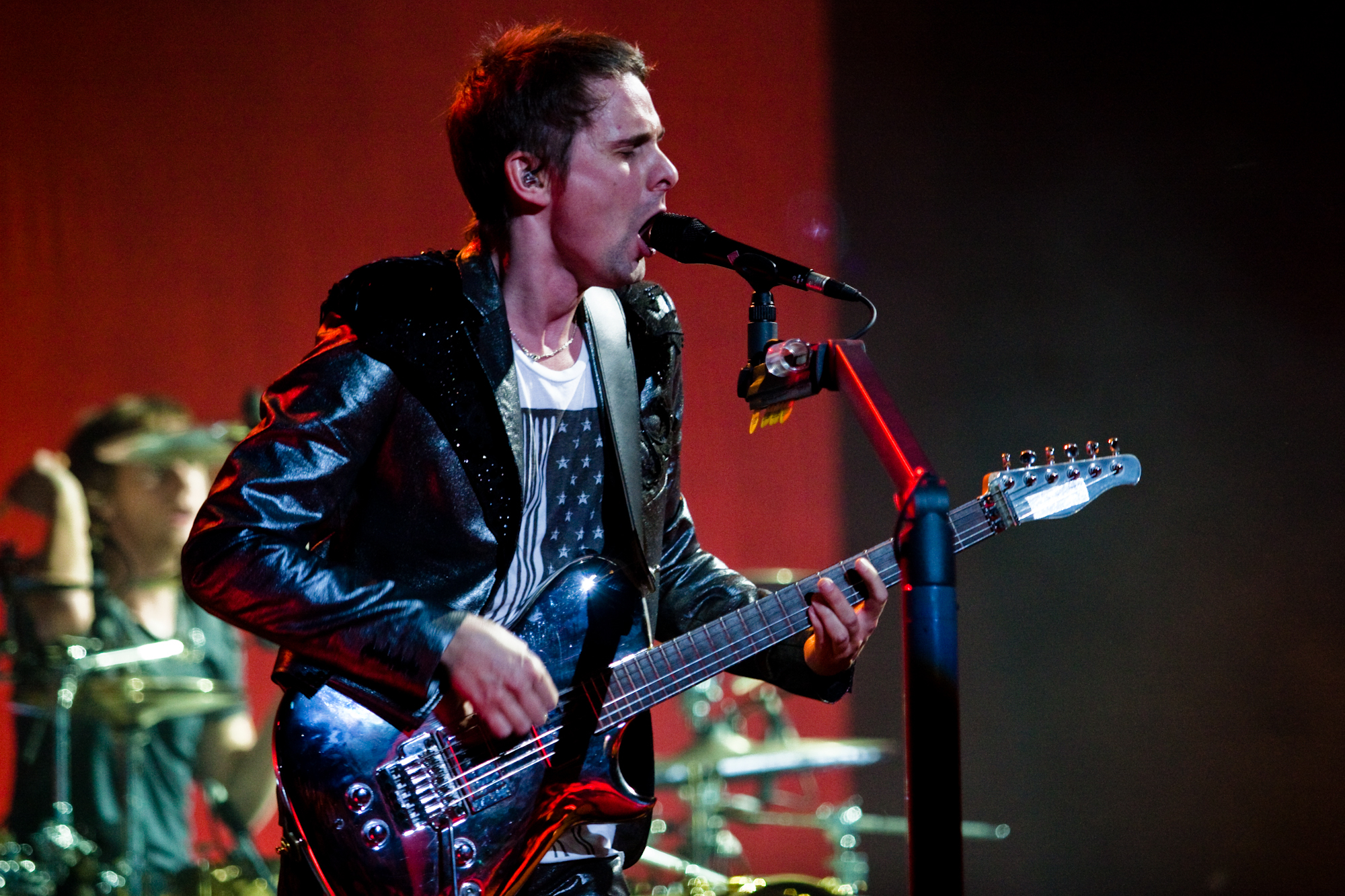
Bellamy performing at the Oracle Arena, Oakland, California, on 11 December 2009

The Resistance Tour began with A Seaside Rendezvous in Muse's hometown of Teignmouth, Devon, in September 2009. It included headline slots the following year at festivals including Coachella, Glastonbury, Oxegen, Hovefestivalen, T in the Park, Austin City Limits and the Australian Big Day Out. Between September and November, Muse toured North America.

Muse provided the lead single for the film The Twilight Saga: Eclipse, "Neutron Star Collision (Love Is Forever)", released on 17 May 2010. In June, Muse headlined Glastonbury Festival for the second time. After U2 canceled their headline slot following their singer Bono's back injury, their guitarist, the Edge, joined Muse to play the U2 track "Where the Streets Have No Name".

For their live performances, Muse received the O2 Silver Clef Award in London on 2 July 2010, presented by Roger Taylor and Brian May of Queen. Taylor described the trio as "probably the greatest live act in the world today". On 12 September 2010, Muse won an MTV Video Music Award in the category of Best Special Effects, for the "Uprising" video. On 21 November, Muse won an American Music Award for Favorite Artist in the Alternative Rock Music Category. On 2 December, Muse were nominated for three awards for the 53rd Grammy Awards on 13 February 2011, for which they won the Grammy Award for Best Rock Album for The Resistance.

Based on having the largest airplay and sales in the US, Muse were named the Billboard Alternative Songs and Rock Songs artist for 2010 with "Uprising", "Resistance" and "Undisclosed Desires" achieving 1st, 6th and 49th places on the year-end Alternative Song chart. On 30 July 2011, Muse supported Rage Against the Machine at their only 2011 gig at the L.A. Rising festival. On 13 August, Muse headlined the Outside Lands Music and Arts Festival in San Francisco. They headlined the Reading and Leeds Festivals in August 2011. To celebrate the tenth anniversary of their album Origin of Symmetry (2001), Muse performed all eleven tracks. Muse also headlined Lollapalooza in Chicago's Grant Park in August 2011.

In an April 2012 interview, Bellamy said Muse's next album would include influences from acts such as French house duo Justice and UK electronic rock group Does It Offend You, Yeah?. On 6 June 2012, Muse released a trailer for their next album, The 2nd Law, with a countdown on the band's website. The trailer, which included dubstep elements, was met with mixed reactions. On 7 June, Muse announced a European Arena tour, the first leg of The 2nd Law Tour. The leg included dates in France, Spain and the UK. The first single from the album, "Survival", was the official song of the London 2012 Summer Olympics, and Muse performed it at the Olympics closing ceremony.

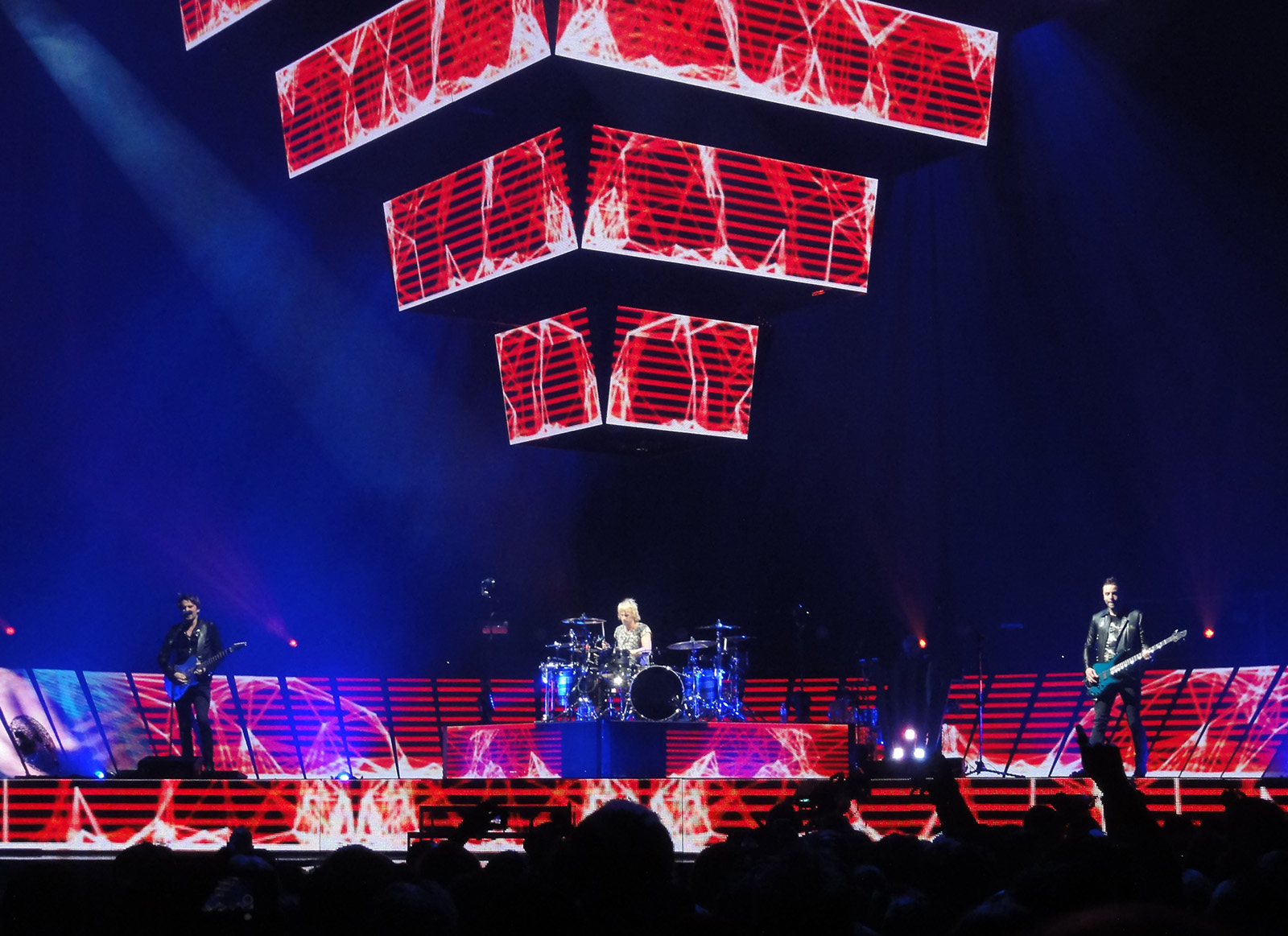
Muse performing in Melbourne in December 2013 during the 2nd Law World Tour

Muse revealed the 2nd Law tracklist on 13 July 2012. The second single, "Madness", was released on 20 August 2012, with a music video on 5 September. Muse played at the Roundhouse on 30 September as part of the iTunes Festival. The 2nd Law was released worldwide on 1 October, and on 2 October 2012 in the US; it reached number one in the UK Albums Chart, and number two on the US Billboard 200. The song "Madness" earned a nomination in the Best Rock Song category and the album itself was nominated for the Best Rock Album at the 55th Grammy Awards, 2013. The band performed the album's opening song, "Supremacy", with an orchestra at the 2013 Brit Awards on 20 February 2013. The album was a nominee for Best Rock Album at the 2013 Grammy Awards. The song "Madness" was also nominated for Best Rock Song. The album listed at number 46 on Rolling Stone's list of the top 50 albums of 2012, saying "In an era of diminished expectations, Muse make stadium-crushing songs that mix the legacies of Queen, King Crimson, Led Zeppelin and Radiohead while making almost every other current band seem tiny."

Muse released their fourth live album, Live at Rome Olympic Stadium, on 29 November 2013 on CD/DVD and CD/Blu-ray formats. In November 2013, the film had theatrical screenings in 20 cities worldwide. The album contains the band's performance at Rome's Stadio Olimpico on 6 July 2013, in front of over 60,000 people; it was the first concert filmed in 4K format. The concert was a part of the Unsustainable Tour, Muse's mid-2013 tour of Europe.

=== 2014–2021: Drones and Simulation Theory ===
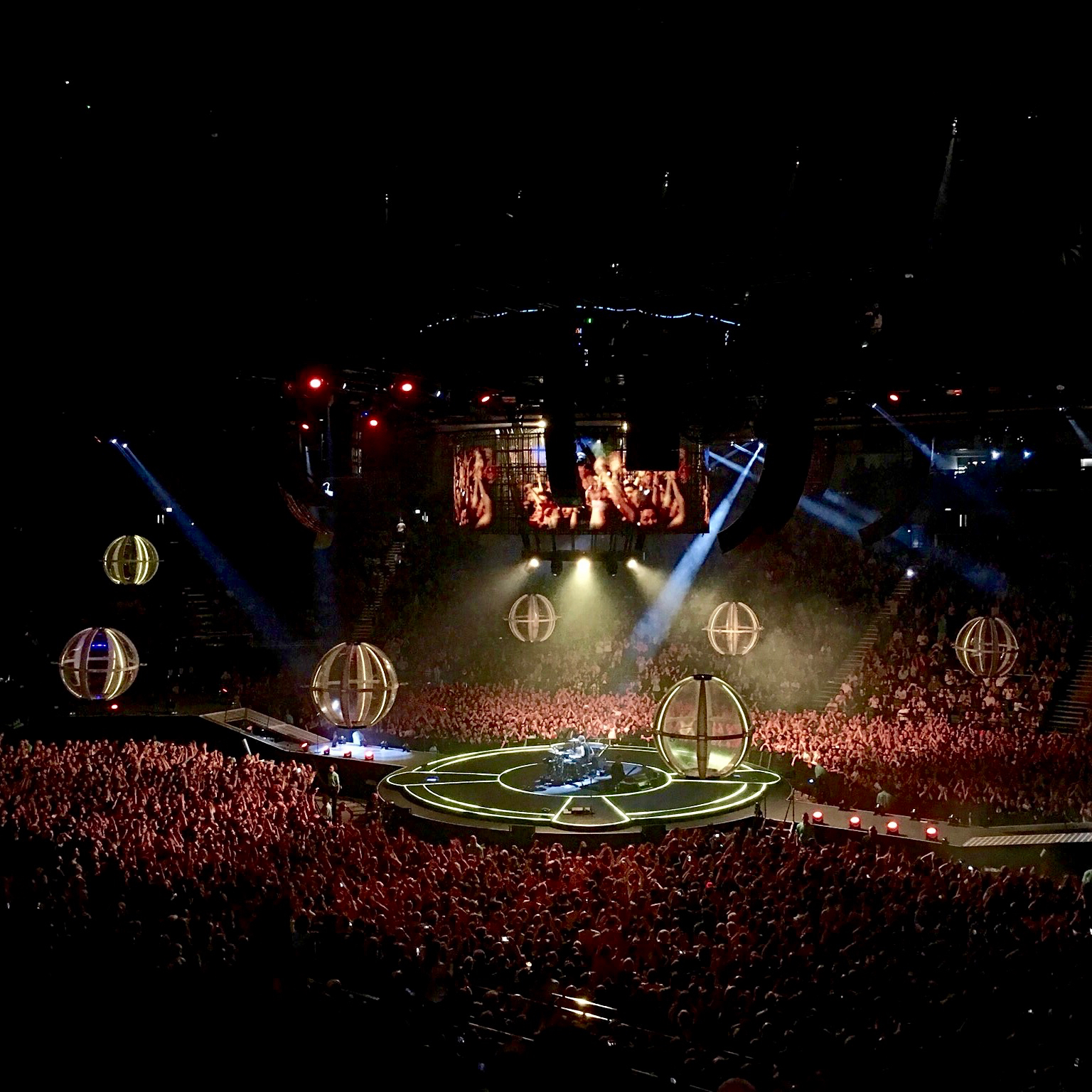
Muse on stage at the O_{2} Arena in London in April 2016 as part of the Drones World Tour

Muse began writing their seventh album soon after the Rome concert. The band felt that the electronic side of their music was becoming too dominant, and wanted to return to a simpler rock sound. After self-producing their previous two albums, the band hired producer Robert John "Mutt" Lange so they could focus on performance and spend less time mixing and reviewing takes. Recording took place in the Vancouver Warehouse Studio from October 2014 to April 2015.

Muse announced their seventh album, Drones, on 11 March 2015. The following day, they released a lyric video for "Psycho" on their YouTube channel, and made the song available for instant download with the album pre-order. Another single, "Dead Inside", was released on 23 March.

From 15 March to 16 May, Muse embarked on a short tour in small venues throughout the UK and the US, the Psycho Tour. Live performances of new songs from these concerts are included on the DVD accompanying the album along with bonus studio footage. On 18 May 2015, Muse released a lyric video for "Mercy" on their YouTube channel, and made the song available for instant download with the album pre-order.

Drones was released on 8 June 2015. A concept album about the dehumanisation of modern warfare, it returned to a simpler rock sound with less elaborate production and genre experimentation. It topped the album charts in the UK, the US, Australia and most major markets. Muse headlined Lollapalooza Berlin on 13 September 2015. On 15 February 2016, Drones won the Grammy Award for Best Rock Album at the 58th Grammy Awards. On 24 June, Muse headlined the Glastonbury Festival for a third time, becoming the first act to have headlined each day of the festival (Friday, Saturday and Sunday). On 30 November 2016, Muse were announced to headline Reading and Leeds 2017.

In 2017, Muse embarked on a co-headlining North American tour with Thirty Seconds to Mars, supported by PVRIS. On 18 May, they released "Dig Down", the first single from their eighth album. In November, they performed at the BlizzCon festival. "Thought Contagion", the second single, was released on 15 February 2018, accompanied by an 1980s-styled music video. In June, Muse opened the Rock In Rio festival. On 24 February, they played a show at La Cigale in France with a setlist voted for fans online, followed by a show at Shepherd's Bush Empire, London, in which they played mainly older material and B-sides. A concert video, Muse: Drones World Tour, was released in cinemas worldwide on 12 July 2018.

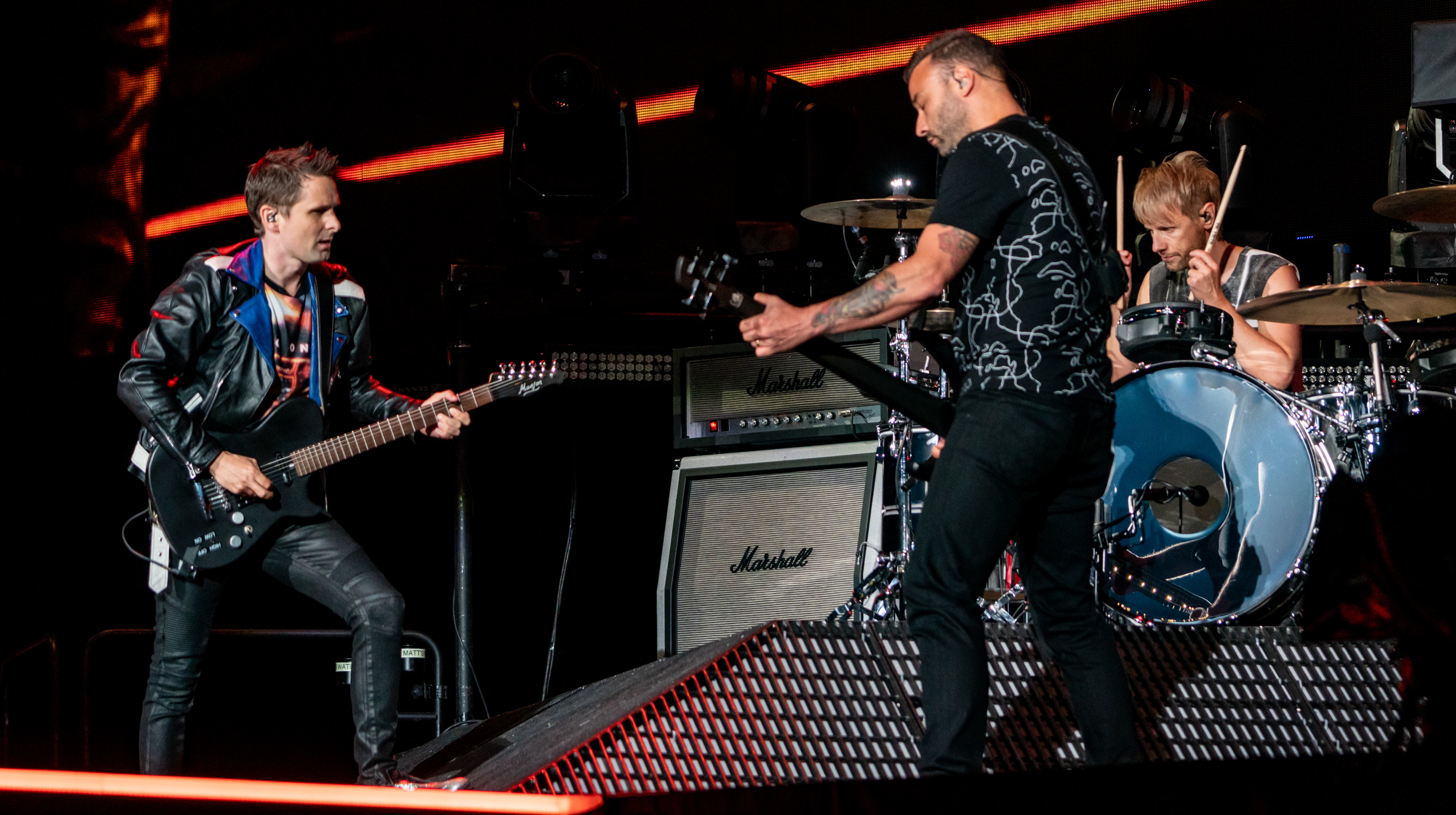
Muse performing in Bristol in June 2019

On 19 July 2018, Muse released the third single from their upcoming album, "Something Human", followed by "The Dark Side" on 30 August and "Pressure" on 27 September. Muse released their eighth studio album, Simulation Theory, with a focus on 80s-inspired synthesisers, on 9 November. The Simulation Theory World Tour began in Houston on 3 February 2019 and concluded on 15 October in Lima. A film based on the album and tour, Muse – Simulation Theory, combining concert footage and narrative scenes, was released in August 2020.

In December 2019, Muse released Origin of Muse, a box set comprising remastered versions of Showbiz and Origin of Symmetry plus previously unreleased material. For the 20th anniversary of Origin of Symmetry in June 2021, Muse released a remixed and remastered version, Origin of Symmetry: XX Anniversary RemiXX.

=== 2022–2024: Will of the People ===
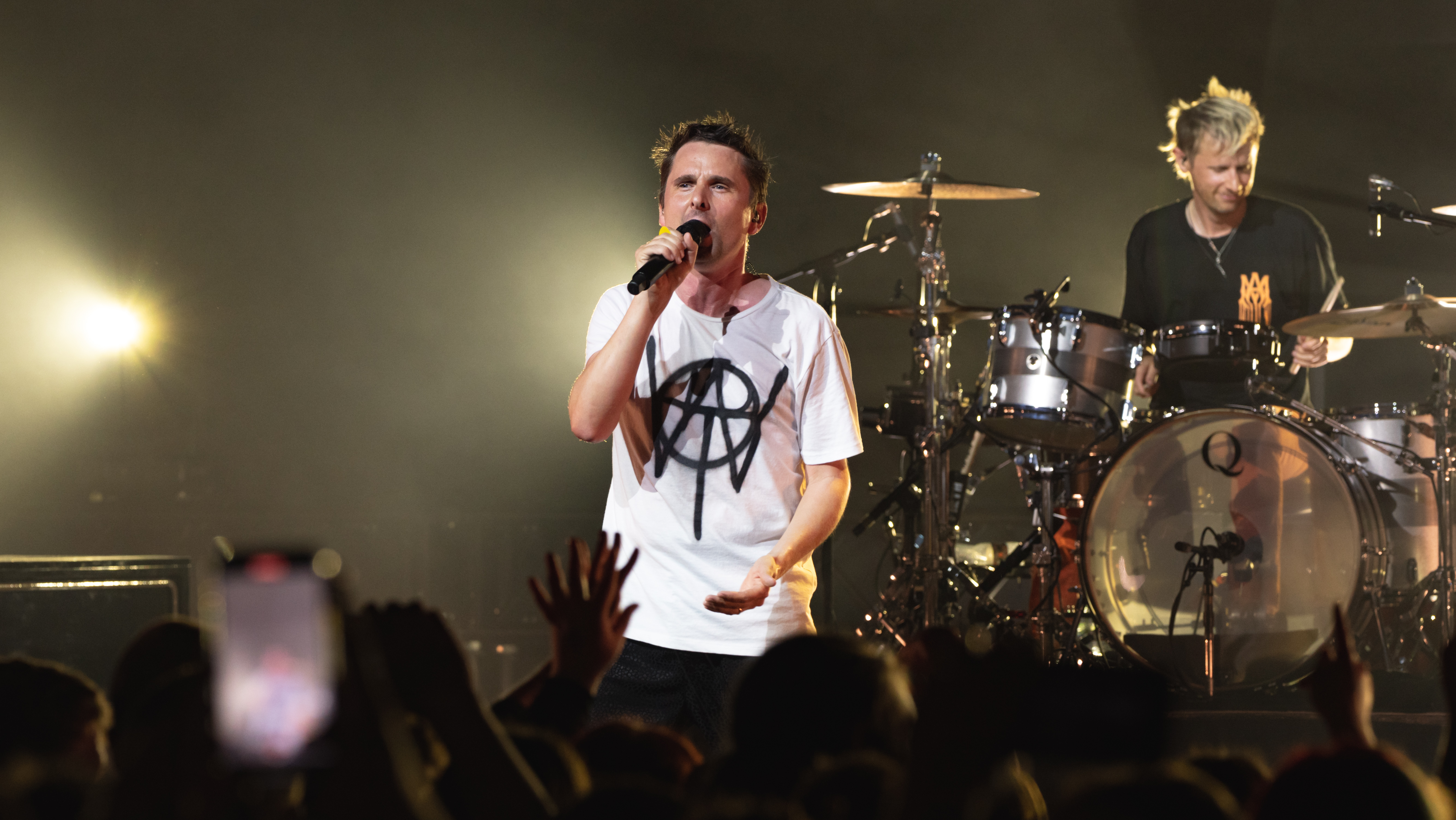
Muse performing in May 2022

On 13 January 2022, Muse released the single "Won't Stand Down", which marked a return to their heavier early sound. On 9 March, Muse posted a 35-second clip across various social media platforms depicting large busts of the band members being torn down. Muse released their ninth album, Will of the People, on 26 August 2022. It was promoted with the singles "Compliance", "Will of the People", "Kill or Be Killed" and "You Make Me Feel Like It's Halloween". The final single "Ghosts (How Can I Move On)" was published as a collaborative version with Italian singer-songwriter Elisa on 25 November 2022.

The Will of the People World Tour began in April 2022. Nicholls was replaced by Dan Lancaster on additional keys, percussion and guitar. On 17 November 2023, Muse released a 20th-anniversary reissue of Absolution, featuring bonus tracks, live recordings and demos. Muse appeared on the song "1685" from the 2024 album Telos by the electronic producer Zedd. In August 2024, Wolstenholme announced a solo project, Chromes, and released the singles "Imaginary World" and "The Good Life".

=== 2025–present: The Wow! Signal ===
According to the Guardian, by 2023, Muse's critical standing had declined, with "hit-and-miss albums" damaging "what was previously a bulletproof reputation for top-notch anthem-making". Bellamy conceded that Simulation Theory and Will of the People were poorly received by critics and fans. The Guardian critic Alexis Petridis suggested that Muse had been weakened by the rise of "dystopian fantasies" and conspiracy theories in the mainstream, and the adoption of their songs by rightwing commentators.

Muse's tenth album, The Wow! Signal, was released on 26 June, 2026. The lyrics were influenced by Bellamy's split from his wife, the model Elle Evans. Most tracks were produced by Lancaster, who pushed Muse to a create a more "fresh" and modern sound. It was backed by the singles "Unravelling", "Be with You", "Cryogen", "Hexagons", "Nightshift Superstar", and "Hush". A North American tour began in July, with a European arena tour to begin in November.

== Musical style ==
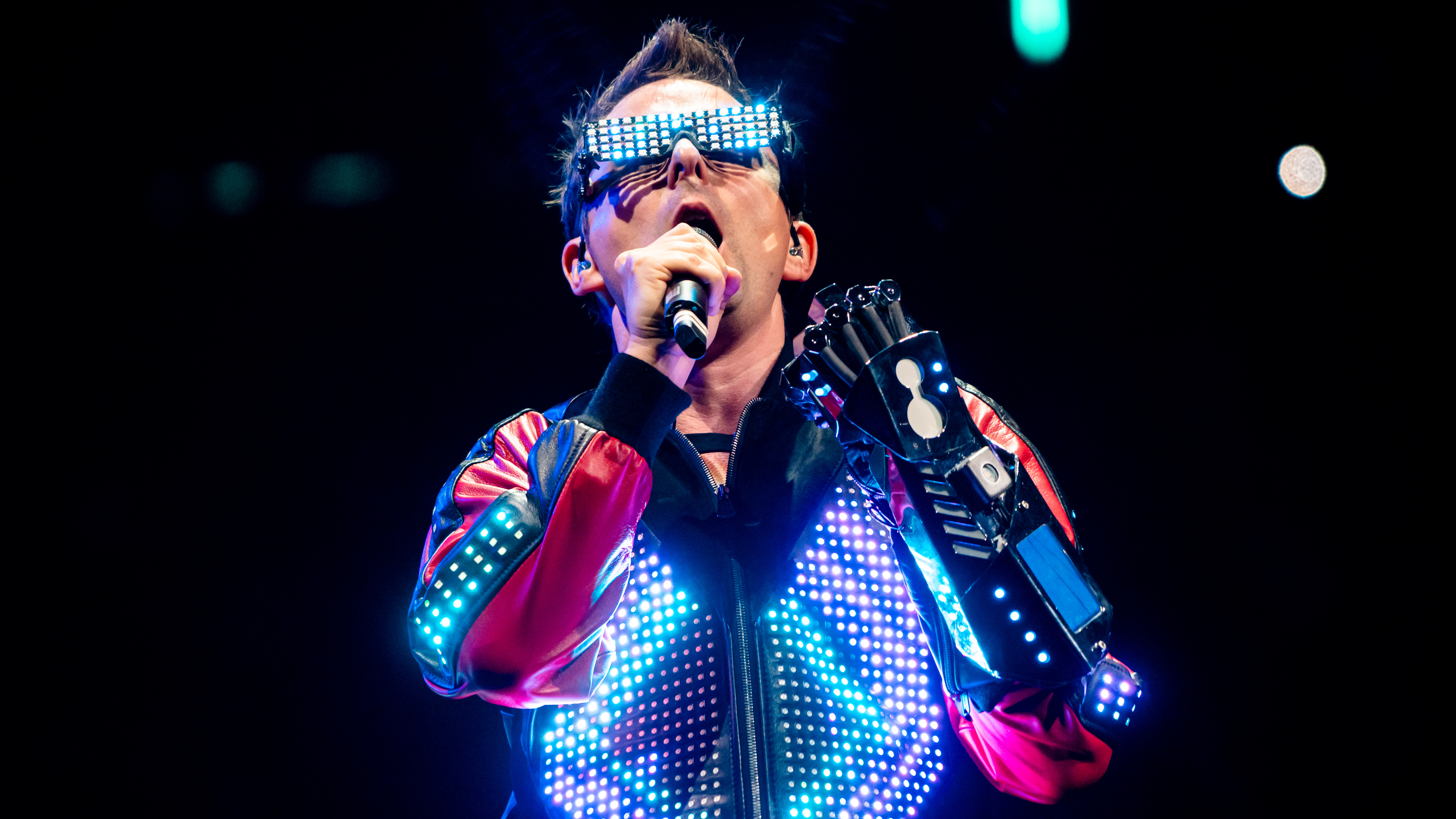
Bellamy performing with the band in September 2019

Critics have identified elements of alternative rock, progressive rock, space rock, hard rock, art rock, electronic rock, progressive metal, indie rock pop, electronica R&B, classical music and rock opera. In 2002, Bellamy described Muse as a "trashy three-piece". He said supporting the Red Hot Chili Peppers on their 1999 Californication tour inspired Muse to become less reserved and "up their game" in their performances. Bellamy said Lady Gaga was an influence on Muse's showmanship and stage costumes, "crossing that line between what is fantasy and what is reality".

Early in their career, Muse were often likened to Radiohead. Spin wrote that Bellamy's voice "often slips into high, mournful tones" similar to the Radiohead singer, Thom Yorke. John Leckie, who produced Muse's first two albums and also produced Radiohead's second album, The Bends (1995), dismissed the comparisons, saying: "In the late 90s, any British band that sang passionately and played guitar was going to get compared to Radiohead." He said he chose to produce Muse after The Bends because he "intentionally looked for something different". Asked in 2009, Bellamy said he did not hear the similarity, saying Muse were "past [the comparisons] in most places". Reviewing their fourth album, Black Holes and Revelations (2006), Spin, Stylus Magazine and Observer Music Monthly wrote that Muse had transcended comparisons to Radiohead. In 2026, the Guardian critic Alexis Petridis wrote that Muse "pulled away from a deluge of post-OK Computer artists by the simple expedient of dialling everything up to 11. As their sound became bombastic and melodramatic, the lyrics dealt not in Radiohead-esque existential grumbling but irrational conspiracy theories, luridly drawn dystopias and apocalypticism."

In 2006, Pitchfork described Muse's music as "firmly ol' skool at heart: proggy hard rock that forgoes any pretensions to restraint ... their songs use full-stacked guitars and thunderous drums to evoke God's footsteps". AllMusic described their sound as a "fusion of progressive rock, glam, electronica, and Radiohead-influenced experimentation". On Muse's association with progressive rock, Howard said: "I associate [progressive rock] with 10-minute guitar solos, but I guess we kind of come into the category. A lot of bands are quite ambitious with their music, mixing lots of different styles – and when I see that I think it's great."

The Guardian described Muse as "fearlessly flamboyant". Howard said he loved the "excess" of their music and that he liked "pushing it as far as we can", citing the choir of "Survival" as an example. Wolstenholme said: "You can go on writing traditional pop-rock songs and get stale or try something new. There are risks either way." The Queen guitarist, Brian May, praised Muse in 2009, calling them "extraordinary musicians" who "let their madness show through, always a good thing in an artist".

Bellamy said that some missed the humour of their music, saying they "often crack up in the studio ... We are aware that at any point we are one step away from a Spinal Tap moment." According to The Telegraph, Muse attracted criticism from "more serious-minded rock critics, who prize the virtue of authenticity above all others. Muse sit at the other end of the spectrum to the blue-collar aesthetic of Bruce Springsteen or Manu Chao." In NME, Anthony Thorton wrote Muse descended from acclaimed rock acts such as Queen, Roxy Music and David Bowie, but their "power and ambition" was unfairly dismissed by critics seeking "authenticity". Bellamy said he saw Muse as part of a tradition of "slightly mad, eccentric English" bands such as Genesis, Queen and Depeche Mode.

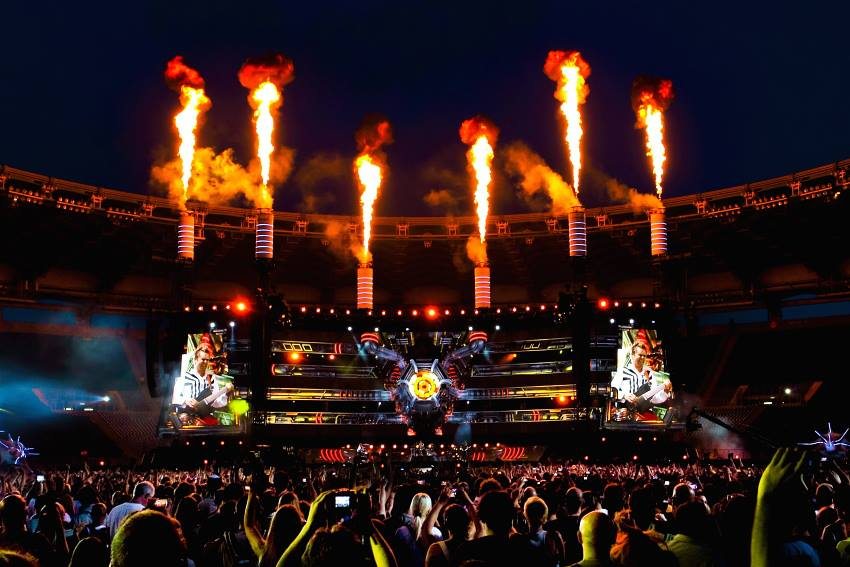
Muse performing "Supremacy" at Stadio Olimpico, Rome on 6 July 2013 during The Unsustainable Tour. Rolling Stone stated the band possess "stadium-crushing songs".

For their second album, Origin of Symmetry (2001), Muse aimed to craft a "heavier", more aggressive sound. Their third album, Absolution (2003), features prominent string arrangements and drew influences from artists such as Queen. Their fourth album, Black Holes and Revelations (2006) was influenced by artists including Depeche Mode and Lightning Bolt, as well as Asian and European music such as Naples music. The band listened to radio stations from the Middle East during the recording sessions.

Muse's sixth album, The 2nd Law (2012) has a broader range of influences, ranging from funk and film scores to electronica and dubstep. The 2nd Law is influenced by rock acts such as Queen and Led Zeppelin (on "Supremacy") as well as dubstep producer Skrillex and Nero (on "The 2nd Law: Unsustainable" and "Follow Me", with the latter being co-produced by Nero), Michael Jackson, Stevie Wonder (on "Panic Station" which features musicians who performed on Stevie Wonder's "Superstition") and Hans Zimmer. The album features two songs with lyrics written and sung by Wolstenholme, who wrote about his battle with alcoholism. It features extensive electronic instrumentation, including modular synthesisers and the French Connection, a synthesiser controller similar to the ondes martenot.

=== Musicianship ===
Many Muse songs are recognisable by Bellamy's vocal vibrato, falsetto, and melismatic phrasing, influenced by Jeff Buckley. As a guitarist, Bellamy often uses arpeggiator and pitch-shift effects to create a more "electronic" sound, citing Jimi Hendrix, Tom Morello and the Edge as influences. His guitar playing is also influenced by Latin and Spanish guitar music; Bellamy said: "I just think that music is really passionate...It has so much feel and flair to it. I’ve spent important times of my life in Spain and Greece, and various deep things happened there – falling in love, stuff like that. So maybe that rubbed off somewhere."

Wolstenholme's basslines provide a motif for many Muse songs; the band combines bass guitar with effects and synthesisers to create overdriven fuzz bass tones. Bellamy and Wolstenholme use touch-screen controllers, often built into their instruments, to control synthesisers and effects including Kaoss Pads and DigiTech Whammy pedals.

=== Lyrics ===
Many Muse lyrics were inspired by conspiracy theories. Bellamy disowned conspiracy theories in later years, saying they had been "hijacked" by rightwing politics and describing them as quackery. The Guardian wrote that Muse incorporate "calls for revolution just vague enough that both the left and right could rally behind them". Bellamy expressed discomfort when the lyrics of The Resistance were adopted by the rightwing Fox News anchor Glenn Beck, and when their song "Uprising" was used in YouTube videos advocating for conspiracy theories. Muse refused requests from American politicians to use "Uprising" in their rallies.

Books that have influenced Muse's lyrics include Nineteen Eighty-Four, Confessions of an Economic Hitman by John Perkins, Hyperspace by Michio Kaku, The 12th Planet by Zecharia Sitchin, Rule by Secrecy by Jim Marrs and Trance Formation of America by Cathy O'Brien.

== Band members ==
=== Official members ===
- Matt Bellamy – lead vocals, guitars, keyboards
- Dominic Howard – drums, percussion
- Chris Wolstenholme – bass, backing vocals

=== Touring musicians ===
==== Current ====
- Dan Lancaster – keyboards, guitars, percussion, backing vocals (2022–present)

==== Former ====
- Morgan Nicholls – keyboards, guitars, percussion, backing vocals, bass (2004, 2006–2022)
- Daniel Newell – trumpet (2006–2008)
- Alessandro Cortini – keyboards, synthesisers (2009, substitute)
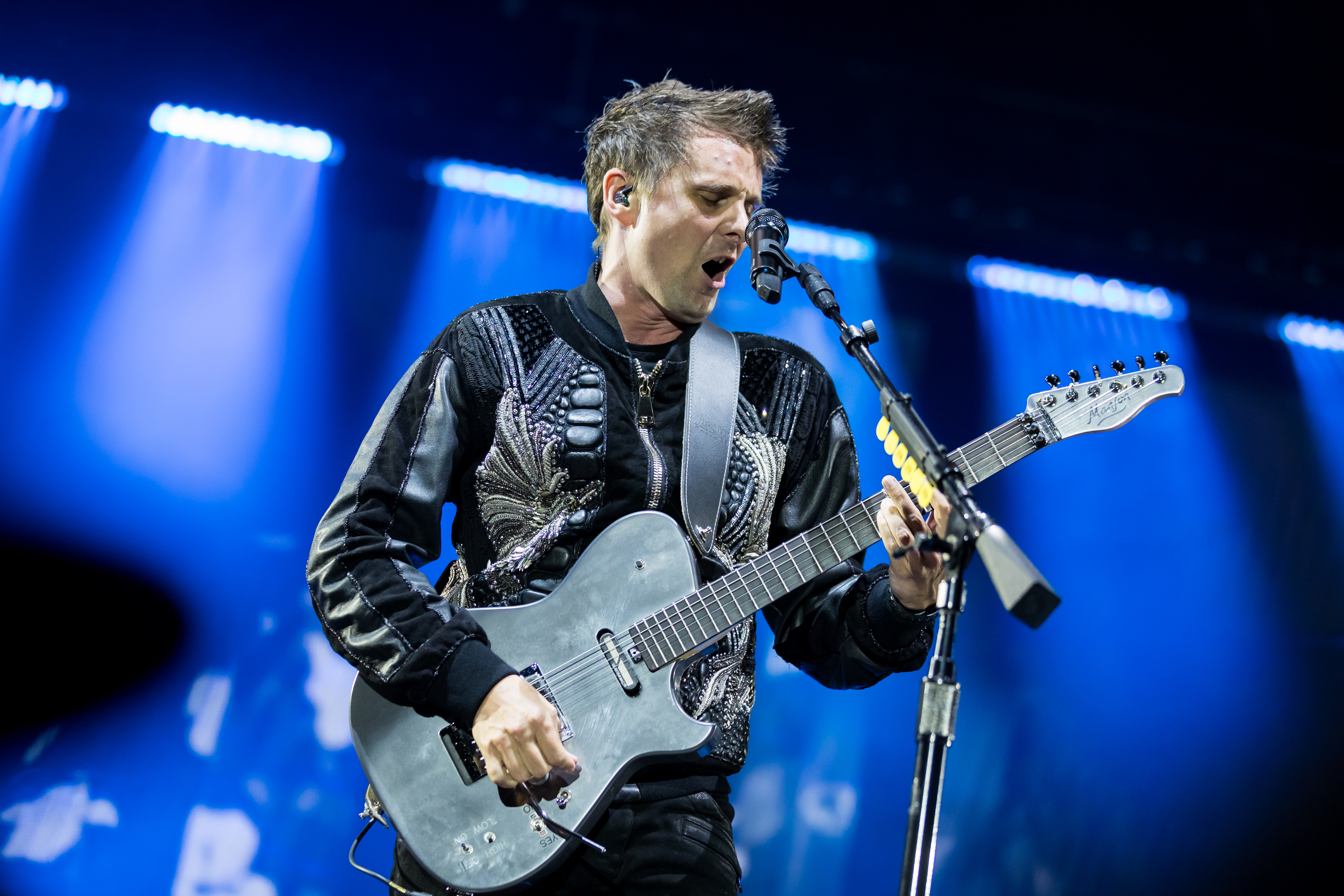
Matt Bellamy

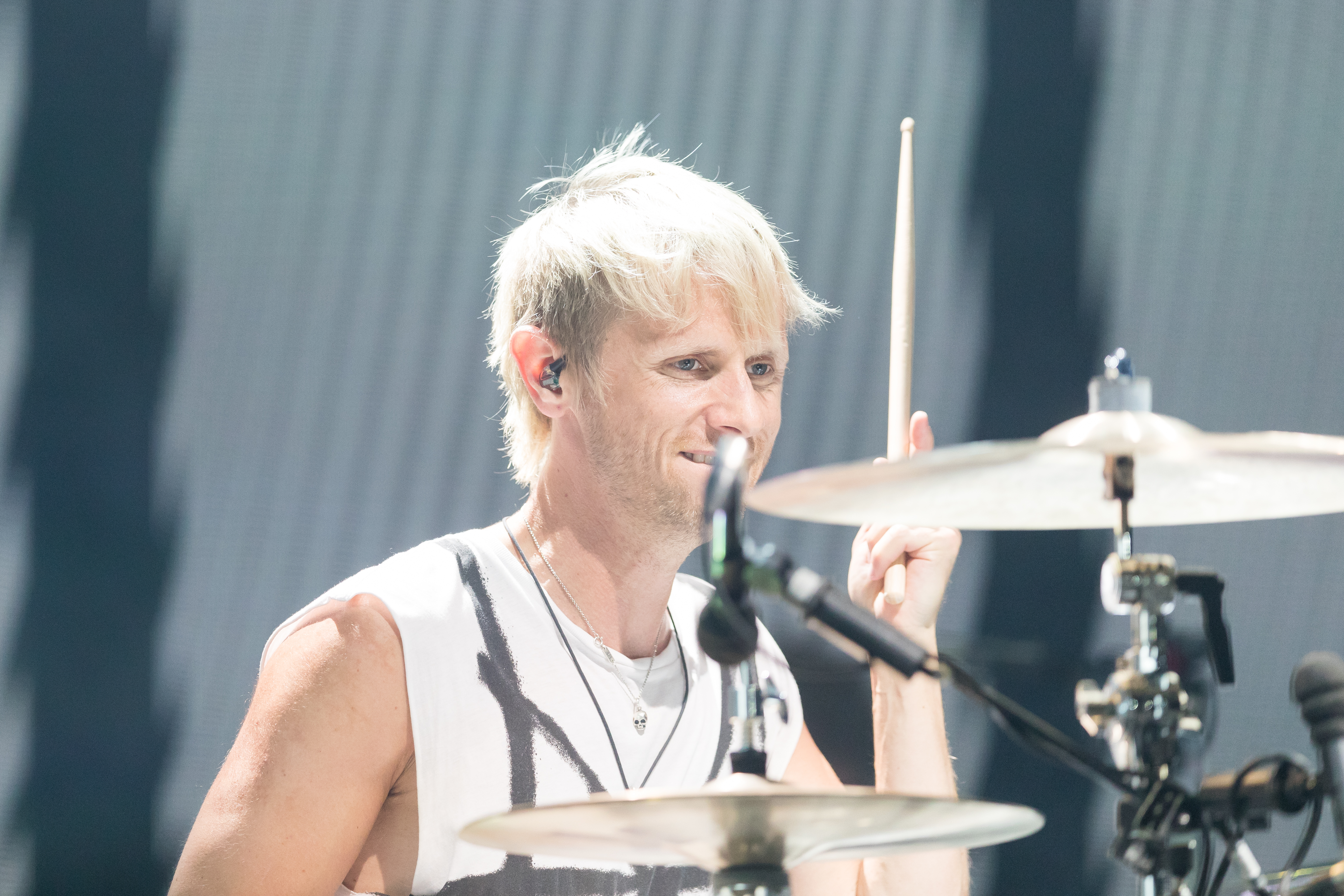
Dominic Howard

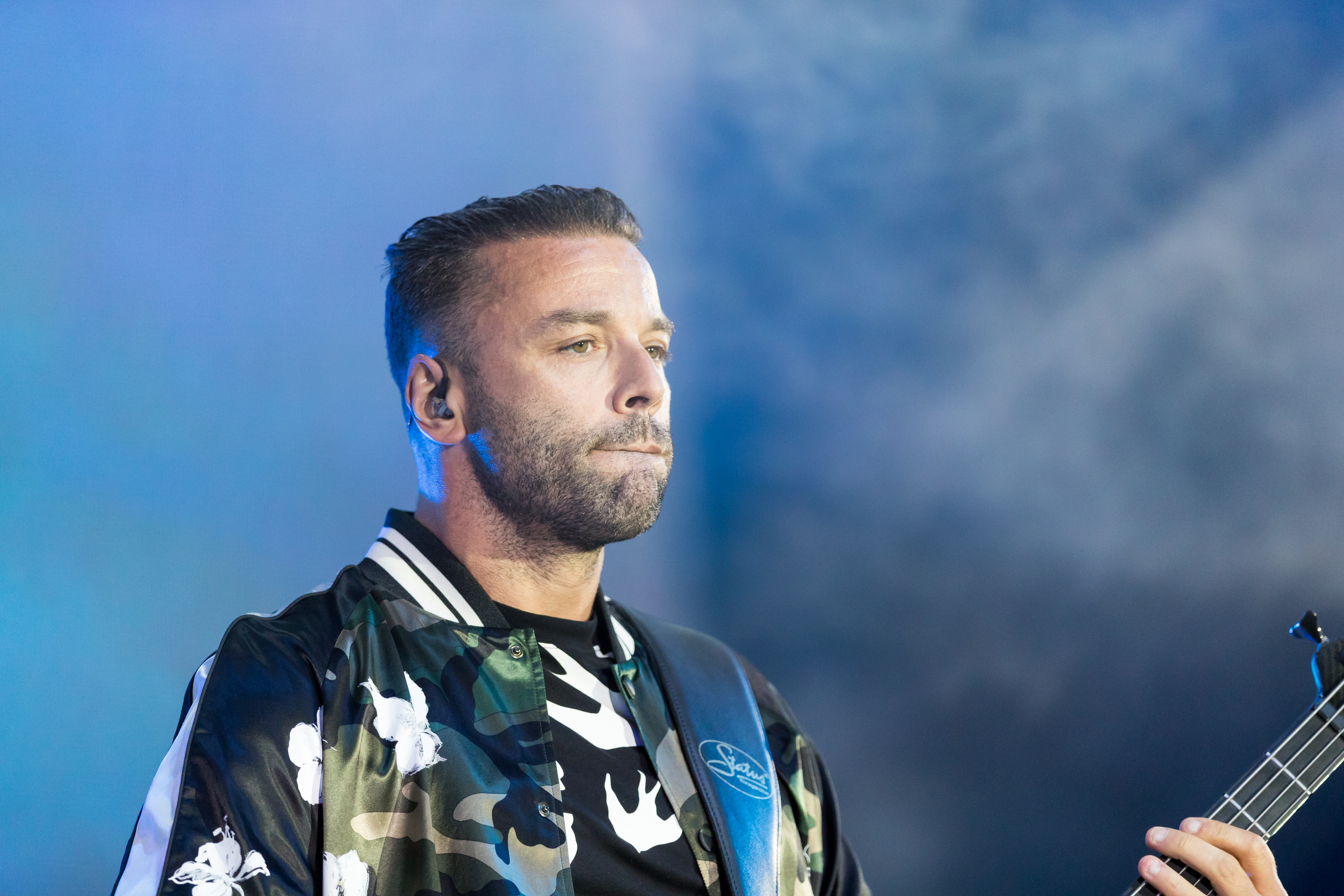
Chris Wolstenholme

== Discography ==
- Showbiz (1999)
- Origin of Symmetry (2001)
- Absolution (2003)
- Black Holes and Revelations (2006)
- The Resistance (2009)
- The 2nd Law (2012)
- Drones (2015)
- Simulation Theory (2018)
- Will of the People (2022)
- The Wow! Signal (2026)

== Concert tours ==
Headlining

- Showbiz Tour (1998–2000)
- Origin of Symmetry Tour (2000–2002)
- Absolution Tour (2003–2004)
- US Campus Invasion Tour 2005 (2005)
- Black Holes and Revelations Tour (2006–2008)
- The Resistance Tour (2009–2011)
- The 2nd Law World Tour (2012–2014)
- Psycho Tour (2015)
- Drones World Tour (2015–2016)
- Simulation Theory World Tour (2019)
- Will of the People World Tour (2022–2023)
- The Wow! Signal Tour (2026–2027)

Co-headlining

- North American Tour (with Thirty Seconds to Mars) (2017)

== See also ==
- List of awards and nominations received by Muse
- List of songs recorded by Muse
