= Will of the People (album) =

Studio album by Muse
- Released: 26 August 2022
- Recorded: June 2020 – December 2021
- Studios: Red Room (Santa Monica); Black Lodge (London); Abbey Road (London)
- Genres: Alternative rock; glam rock; synth-pop; arena rock; hard rock; progressive metal
- Length: 37:39
- Labels: Warner; Helium-3
- Producer: Muse

Muse chronology
Origin of Muse (2019)	Will of the People (2022)	The Wow! Signal (2026)

Singles from Will of the People
- 1. "Won't Stand Down" Released: 13 January 2022; 2. "Compliance" Released: 17 March 2022; 3. "Will of the People" Released: 1 June 2022; 4. "Kill or Be Killed" Released: 21 July 2022; 5. "You Make Me Feel Like It's Halloween" Released: 26 August 2022; 6. "Ghosts (How Can I Move On)" Released: 25 November 2022

Will of the People is the ninth studio album by the English rock band Muse, released through Warner Records and Helium-3 on 26 August 2022. Self-produced by the band, it is a genre-hopping album that Matt Bellamy described as "a greatest hits album – of new songs". "Won't Stand Down", "Compliance", "Will of the People", and "Kill or Be Killed" were released as singles before the album was released, and "You Make Me Feel Like It's Halloween" was released as a single the same day the album came out, followed by the final single "Ghosts (How Can I Move On)" featuring Italian singer-songwriter Elisa.

The album received generally positive reviews and became Muse's seventh consecutive number-one album in the UK. A world tour in support of the album, the Will of the People World Tour, began in April 2022 and concluded in November 2023. It was ranked as the number 17 best guitar album of 2022 by Guitar World readers.

== Background and recording ==
About the origins of the album, Matt Bellamy related that Warner Records requested a greatest hits album from Muse. Instead, the band decided to make an album that was a "montage" of "all of those types of genres that we’ve touched on in the past" and would feel like "a greatest hits album – of new songs." Warner stated that the album spans multiple genres, describing "Will of the People" as a "glam rocker" and "Kill or Be Killed" as "industrial".

Bellamy said the lyrics on the album were inspired by "the increasing uncertainty and instability in the world [...] as the Western empire and the natural world, which have cradled us for so long, are genuinely threatened. This album is a personal navigation through those fears and preparation for what comes next."

The album was recorded at Bellamy's Red Room studio in Santa Monica, California, as well as at Black Lodge and Abbey Road Studios in London.

== Promotion and release ==
The first snippet from the album was heard on 25 December 2021, when Bellamy briefly livestreamed himself and his then 10-year-old son, Bing, listening to the song "Won't Stand Down". About two weeks later, Muse announced the song would be released on 13 January 2022, making it their first single since "Pressure" in September 2018. The second single from the album, "Compliance", was released on 17 March, alongside the announcement of the album and its release date of 26 August.

The third single from the album was the title track, which was released on 1 June 2022. That same month, Muse began the European festival leg of their Will of the People World Tour, on which they played all three of the new singles live, as well as a then-unreleased track from the album, "Kill or Be Killed". On 21 July, "Kill or Be Killed" was released as the album's fourth single. On 23 August, Muse announced that a fifth single from the album, "You Make Me Feel Like It's Halloween", would be released on 26 August, the same day as the release of the album.

On 25 November 2022 "Ghosts (How Can I Move On)" was released as the sixth and final single from the album featuring Italian singer-songwriter Elisa. A French-language version featuring Mylène Farmer was released two weeks later, on 9 December.

On 1 August 2022, it was announced that Will of the People could be purchased as a non-fungible token (NFT) on the "eco-friendly" Polygon-powered platform Serenade, and that it would be the first album for which NFT sales would qualify for the UK and Australian charts. Per The Guardian: "The Muse NFT album will retail for £20 and will be limited to 1,000 copies globally. As both an NFT and a limited-edition format, it is relatively sparse in its offering. Buyers will get a downloadable version of the album – complete with different sleeve – as high-res FLAC files; the members of Muse will digitally sign it and each of the 1,000 buyers will have their names permanently listed on the linked roster of purchasers."

== Composition ==
Musically, Will of the People has been described as glam rock, alternative rock, synth-pop, arena rock, hard rock, progressive rock, progressive metal, industrial metal, and electropop.

== Critical reception ==
Professional ratings
Aggregate scores
Source	Rating
AnyDecentMusic?	6.5/10
Metacritic	71/100
Review scores
Source	Rating
AllMusic	3.5/5 stars
Clash	7/10
Classic Rock	4.5/5 stars
DIY	2.5/5 stars
Gigwise	8/10 stars
Kerrang!	4/5
MusicOMH	3.5/5 stars
NME	4/5 stars
Pitchfork	3.7/10
Sputnikmusic	3.5/5

Will of the People received generally positive reviews from critics. On Metacritic, it has a normalised score of 71 out of 100 based on 14 mainstream critics, indicating "generally favourable reviews". Neil Z. Yeung of AllMusic stated that "While Will of the People is not as essential as their 2000s classics, it's a quick, satisfying burst of Muse essentials that cleverly forgoes the hits-compilation graveyard in favor of fresh material that honors both their evolution and dedicated fan base." Emily Swingle of Clash described the album as "a sharp, punchy dose of Muse...[despite] lyrics [that] can feel uninspired." Writing for Classic Rock, Mark Beaumont wrote, "Muse master the wider range of future rock and pop sonics they’ve been toying with for the past decade and refine and define their current sound as neatly as Black Holes & Revelations did for their 2000s period." Emma Wilkes of DIY called the album "A smorgasbord of dystopian-flavoured cringe." Andrew Belt of Gigwise writes, "Will of the People is heavy on doom-laden lyrics...Yet it also finds Muse at the top of their game — and having a ball — across ten distinctive songs."

== Commercial performance ==
In the UK, the album sold 51,500 units in its first week of release, which was enough to make it Muse's seventh consecutive album to top the UK Albums Chart. In the US, with 24,000 album equivalent units, it debuted at number 15 on the Billboard 200, and number 1 on Billboard's Top Alternative Albums and Top Rock Albums charts. As of January 2023, Will of the People has sold over 300,000 units worldwide.

== Track listing ==
All tracks are written by Matt Bellamy.

Will of the People track listing
No.	Title	Length
1.	"Will of the People"	3:18
2.	"Compliance"	4:10
3.	"Liberation"	3:06
4.	"Won't Stand Down"	3:29
5.	"Ghosts (How Can I Move On)"	3:36
6.	"You Make Me Feel Like It's Halloween"	3:00
7.	"Kill or Be Killed"	5:00
8.	"Verona"	4:56
9.	"Euphoria"	3:23
10.	"We Are Fucking Fucked"	3:36
Total length:		37:40

== Personnel ==
Muse

- Matt Bellamy – lead vocals, crowd vocals (track 1), guitar, piano, keyboards, synthesisers, programming, production, engineering, art direction
- Dominic Howard – drums, percussion, programming, crowd vocals (track 1), production, engineering, art direction
- Chris Wolstenholme – bass guitar, backing vocals, crowd vocals (track 1), production, engineering, art direction

Additional musicians

- Elle Bellamy, Bing Bellamy, Caris Wolstenholme, Ernie Wolstenholme, Buster Wolstenholme, Teddi Wolstenholme, Tabitha Wolstenholme Tolhurst, Indiana Wolstenholme Tolhurst – crowd vocals (track 1)

Technical personnel

- Aleks Von Korff – additional production, engineering, mixing (track 7)
- Adrian Bushby – additional engineer (track 7)
- Şerban Ghenea – mixing (tracks 1–3, 5, 6, 8–10)
- Bryce Bordone – mixing engineer (tracks 1–3, 5, 6, 8–10)
- Dan Lancaster – mixing (track 4)
- Rhys May – mixing assistant (track 4)
- Joe Devenney – mixing assistant (track 7), studio assistant (Red Room)
- Chris Gehringer – mastering
- Andy Maxwell – studio assistant (Abbey Road)
- Tommy Bosustow – studio runner (Abbey Road)
- Chris Whitemyer – technical assistant
- Paul Warren – technical assistant

Artwork

- Jesse Lee Stout – creative director, art direction, cover and gatefold art
- Tiago Marinho – cover and gatefold art
- Tyrone Yarde – cover and gatefold art
- Gabriella Russo – cover and gatefold art
- Nick Fancher – photography
- Andrea "Waarp" Marcias – back cover and Side 1 label/CD art
- Miko del Rosario – Side 2 label art

== Charts ==
=== Weekly charts ===
Weekly chart performance for Will of the People
Chart (2022)	Peak position
Australian Albums (ARIA)	1
Austrian Albums (Ö3 Austria)	1
Belgian Albums (Ultratop Flanders)	2
Belgian Albums (Ultratop Wallonia)	1
Canadian Albums (Billboard)	5
Croatian International Albums (HDU)	1
Czech Albums (ČNS IFPI)	37
Danish Albums (Hitlisten)	18
Dutch Albums (Album Top 100)	2
Finnish Albums (Suomen virallinen lista)	2
French Albums (SNEP)	1
German Albums (Offizielle Top 100)	2
Hungarian Albums (MAHASZ)	4
Irish Albums (Official Charts)	2
Italian Albums (FIMI)	1
Japanese Albums (Oricon)	15
Lithuanian Albums (AGATA)	58
New Zealand Albums (RMNZ)	1
Norwegian Albums (VG-lista)	16
Polish Albums (ZPAV)	6
Portuguese Albums (AFP)	1
Scottish Albums (Official Charts)	1
Slovak Albums (ČNS IFPI)	51
Spanish Albums (Promusicae)	2
Swedish Albums (Sverigetopplistan)	27
Swiss Albums (Schweizer Hitparade)	1
UK Albums (Official Charts)	1
UK Progressive Albums (OCC)	1
US Billboard 200	15
US Top Album Sales (Billboard)	4
US Top Rock Albums (Billboard)	1
US Top Alternative Albums (Billboard)	1

=== Year-end charts ===
2022 year-end chart performance for Will of the People
Chart (2022)	Position
Belgian Albums (Ultratop Flanders)	176
Belgian Albums (Ultratop Wallonia)	32
Dutch Albums (Album Top 100)	96
French Albums (SNEP)	43
Swiss Albums (Schweizer Hitparade)	15
UK Albums (OCC)	85

2023 year-end chart performance for Will of the People
Chart (2023)	Position
French Albums (SNEP)	184

== Certifications ==
Sales certifications for Will of the People
Region	Certification	Certified units/sales
France (SNEP)	Platinum	100,000^{‡}
United Kingdom (BPI)	Gold	100,000^{‡}
^{‡} Sales+streaming figures based on certification alone.
