= Compliance (song) =

- Cover of the Purple Disco Machine remix

Single by Muse

from the album Will of the People
- Released: 17 March 2022
- Recorded: 2022
- Genre: Pop rock; synth-pop
- Length: 4:10
- Label: Warner
- Songwriter: Matt Bellamy
- Producer: Muse

Muse singles chronology
"Won't Stand Down" (2022)	"Compliance" (2022)	"Will of the People" (2022)

Music video
- "Compliance" on YouTube

"Compliance" is a song by English rock band Muse. It was released as a single on 17 March 2022 as the second single from Will of the People, their ninth studio album.

== Release ==
"Compliance" was announced through Muse's social media channels on 11 March 2022, alongside a cryptic short video featuring a quote which explains the backstory of the song, which read as follows:

Compliance is about the promise of safety and reassurance sold to us by powerful entities during times of vulnerability. Gangs, governments, demagogues, social media algorithms & religions seduce us with misleading untruths and comforting fables. They want us to join their narrow worldview in exchange for obedience and turning a blind eye to our own internal voice of reason & compassion. They just need our Compliance.

Additional social media posts were published on 16 March, the day before the release of "Compliance", confirming that both "Compliance" and previously released single "Won't Stand Down" will feature on Muse's upcoming ninth studio album, Will of the People.

== Writing and composition ==
Lyrically, "Compliance" is an anti-establishment protest song, in common with previous Muse songs such as "Uprising". It features themes of oppression of the people, delivered from the perspective of the oppressor; lyrics such as "we have what you need, just reach out and touch" and "you will feel no pain any more" are an attempt to gaslight the population into accepting their oppressed state as being better than any alternative scenario. "Compliance" was released less than a month after the commencement of the 2022 Russian invasion of Ukraine, and the lyrics highlight the plight of the Ukrainian people by exposing Russia's perspective of the conflict; songwriter Matt Bellamy stated that, among other themes, the song references "new wars in Europe".

Musically, "Compliance" was described by Mike DeWald of Riff as a "melodic alt-pop rocker", while Ludovic Hunter-Tilney of Financial Times labeled the song as synth-pop. Muse lead singer Matt Bellamy said he thought the song was "the best pop track we've ever done".

== Music video ==
The music video for "Compliance", directed by Jeremi Durand and shot in Poland, was released with the single on 17 March. The video features references to 2012 film Looper; three masked children, wearing masks resembling the band members, travel to a dystopian future in an attempt to destroy it and save their future selves. Much of the video is shot in reversed slow-motion. The music video shares a common theme with "Won't Stand Down", commencing with the same metallic masked figure who appeared in the music video for this single.

== Live performances ==
"Compliance" made its live debut at a special invitation-only concert at the Cavern Club in Exeter, Devon, not far from the band's home town of Teignmouth, held on 7 April 2022. In contrast to the studio recording, it is usually played in a heavier, guitar-based version.

In live performances, the song is usually paired with "The Gallery", the B-side to 2001 single "Bliss", as an instrumental introduction. "The Gallery" made its live debut in this role at a charity concert to support the victims of the 2022 Russian invasion of Ukraine at the Hammersmith Apollo on 9 May 2022, 21 years after it was released.

== Personnel ==
Credits adapted from Tidal.

Muse

- Matt Bellamy – lead vocals, guitars, keyboards, production
- Chris Wolstenholme – bass, production
- Dominic Howard – drums, production

Production

- Aleks Von Korff – additional production, engineering
- Serban Ghenea – mixing
- Chris Gehringer – mastering
- Bryce Bordine – mixing engineer
- Andy Maxwell – studio assistant
- Joe Devenney – studio assistant
- Tommy Bosustow – studio assistant
- Chris Whitemyer – technical assistant
- Paul Warren – technical assistant

== Charts ==
Chart performance for "Compliance"
Chart (2022)	Peak position
Mexico Ingles Airplay (Billboard)	23
UK Singles Sales (OCC)	45
UK Singles Downloads (OCC)	45
UK Rock & Metal (Official Charts)	21
US Rock & Alternative Airplay (Billboard)	38

Chart performance for "Compliance" (Purple Disco Machine remix)
Chart (2023)	Peak position
Belarus Airplay (TopHit)	161
Spain Airplay (TopHit)	55

== Release history ==
Release history for "Compliance"
Region	Date	Format	Label	Ref.
Italy	17 March 2022	Contemporary hit radio	Warner	
