= You Make Me Feel Like It's Halloween =

Single by Muse

from the album Will of the People
- Released: 26 August 2022
- Genre: Electronic rock; dance-rock; synth-pop; alternative rock; glam rock
- Length: 3:00
- Label: Warner; Helium-3
- Songwriter: Matt Bellamy
- Producer: Muse

Muse singles chronology
"Kill or Be Killed" (2022)	"You Make Me Feel Like It's Halloween" (2022)	"Unravelling" (2025)

Music video
- "You Make Me Feel Like It's Halloween" on YouTube

"You Make Me Feel Like It's Halloween" is a song by English rock band Muse, released as the fifth track from the band's ninth studio album Will of the People. It was also released as a standalone single alongside a music video. The song has a horror theme, with a music video referencing popular horror media such as IT and The Shining.

== Composition and lyrics ==
"You Make Me Feel Like it's Halloween" has been described as an electronic rock, dance-rock, synth-pop, alternative rock and glam rock song, featuring a 1980s pop aesthetic. The synthesizer work has been described as "ominous" and John Carpenter-esque. The track also experiments with "frazzled, spooky distortion", and features organs throughout.

Lyrically, the song is about "the claustrophobia of an abusive relationship," such as domestic violence during the COVID-19 pandemic.

== Music video ==
The music video, directed by Tom Teller, features a group of masked figures sneaking into a house only to discover that it is haunted. The video features many references to horror media such as IT, Friday the 13th, Poltergeist, The Shining, and a nod to Corey Taylor's Slipknot mask, who was an influence on the new album. Band members Matt Bellamy, Chris Wolstenholme, and Dominic Howard appear as framed paintings in the background.

== Personnel ==
Muse

- Matt Bellamy – vocals, guitar, piano, keyboards
- Dominic Howard – drums, percussion
- Chris Wolstenholme – bass guitar

Technical

- Matt Bellamy – production, engineering
- Dominic Howard – engineering
- Chris Wolstenholme – engineering
- Serban Ghenea – mixing engineer
- Bryce Bordone – mixing engineer
- Chris Gehringer – mastering
- Andy Maxwell – studio assistant (Abbey Road)
- Tommy Bosustow – studio runner (Abbey Road)
- Chris Whitemyer – technical assistant
- Paul Warren – technical assistant

== Charts ==
Chart performance for "You Make Me Feel Like It's Halloween"
Chart (2022)	Peak position
New Zealand Hot Singles (RMNZ)	32
UK Singles Sales (OCC)	3
UK Physical Singles (OCC)	1
US Rock & Alternative Airplay (Billboard)	41
