= Won't Stand Down (Muse song) =

Single by Muse

from the album Will of the People
- Released: 13 January 2022
- Recorded: 2021
- Genre: Heavy metal; hard rock; electronic rock; metalcore
- Length: 3:29
- Label: Warner
- Songwriter: Matt Bellamy
- Producer: Muse

Muse singles chronology
"Pressure" (2018)	"Won't Stand Down" (2022)	"Compliance" (2022)

Music video
- "Won't Stand Down" on YouTube

"Won't Stand Down" is a song by English rock band Muse. Released as a single on 13 January 2022, it is their first single from Will of the People, their ninth studio album. It topped the UK Rock & Metal chart and reached number 56 on the UK Singles Chart. The song was a sleeper hit in the United States, reaching number 1 on Billboard's Mainstream Rock Airplay chart in May 2022, becoming the first Muse song to do so.

== Release ==
On 25 December 2021, Muse lead singer and guitarist Matt Bellamy held a brief livestream on the official Muse Instagram account. In the video, he can be seen driving his Tesla on Autopilot mode, with his 10-year-old son Bing in the passenger seat. The pair are listening (and, in Bing's case, headbanging) to a then-unreleased Muse song, entitled "Won't Stand Down" on the car stereo screen, while Matt provides occasional commentary over the track. In total, the livestream previewed a roughly one-minute-long section of the song. Muse's own Instagram account hinted towards the release of a new single in a post on 31 December, initially uploaded with the caption "Looking forward to WSD. We'll see you on the other side!" before "WSD" was changed to "2022" after a few minutes.

The release of "Won't Stand Down" as a single was officially confirmed by Muse on 7 January 2022, with the release date set for 13 January on all digital platforms. On 9 January, a further snippet of the song, this time consisting of the opening verse, was posted to Muse's TikTok account as well as a "Won't Stand Down"-themed Instagram Stories mask filter.

== Writing and composition ==
Musically, the song has been described as heavy metal, hard rock, and electronic rock. Prior to release, the song was described as Muse's "heaviest material yet", featuring a metalcore breakdown. The song also contains "heavy guitars and industrial-like distortions", and "triplet-flow-type vocals in the verse". The song was mixed by Dan Lancaster, who would become Muse's new live touring member from 2022 onwards, replacing longtime touring member, Morgan Nicholls.

According to vocalist and guitarist Matt Bellamy, "'Won't Stand Down' is a song about standing your ground against bullies, whether that be on the playground, at work or anywhere."

== Artwork and music video ==
The digital artwork for "Won't Stand Down" was described as "dark and ominous", featuring a hooded priest-like figure hovering over ten disciples, figures wearing digital-style masks and gothic chandeliers. A short teaser of the music video was posted to Muse's TikTok account on 9 January.

== Personnel ==
Credits adapted from Tidal

Muse

- Matt Bellamy – lead vocals, guitars, keyboards, production
- Chris Wolstenholme – bass, backing vocals, production
- Dominic Howard – drums, production

Production

- Aleks Von Korff – additional production, engineering
- Dan Lancaster – mixing
- Chris Gehringer – mastering
- Rhys May – mixing assistant
- Andy Maxwell – studio assistant
- Joe Devenney – studio assistant
- Tommy Bosustow – studio assistant
- Chris Whitemyer – technical assistant
- Paul Warren – technical assistant

== Charts ==
=== Weekly charts ===
Weekly chart performance for "Won't Stand Down"
Chart (2022)	Peak position
Australia Digital Tracks (ARIA)	27
Canada Digital Songs (Billboard)	41
Canada Rock (Billboard)	6
Czech Republic (Modern Rock)	10
Euro Digital Song Sales (Billboard)	7
France (SNEP)	118
Hungary (Single Top 40)	18
Mexico Ingles Airplay (Billboard)	28
New Zealand Hot Singles (RMNZ)	30
Switzerland (Schweizer Hitparade)	46
UK Singles (Official Charts)	56
UK Rock & Metal (Official Charts)	1
US Hot Rock & Alternative Songs (Billboard)	27
US Rock & Alternative Airplay (Billboard)	3

=== Year-end charts ===
Year-end chart performance for "Won't Stand Down"
Chart (2022)	Position
US Hot Rock & Alternative Songs (Billboard)	85
US Rock Airplay (Billboard)	10

== Awards and nominations ==
Awards and nominations for "Won't Stand Down"
Year	Organization	Award	Result	Ref(s)
2022	MTV Video Music Awards	Rock Video of the Year	Nominated	

== Release history ==
Release history for "Won't Stand Down"
Region	Date	Format	Label	Ref.
Italy	14 January 2022	Contemporary hit radio	Warner	
United States	18 January 2022	Alternative radio	Warner	
United States	18 January 2022	Rock radio	Warner	
