= Algorithm (song) =

Song by Muse

from the album Simulation Theory
- Released: 9 November 2018
- Recorded: 2017/2018
- Genre: Electronic rock; industrial rock; pop rock; new wave; synth-pop
- Length: 4:05
- Label: Warner Bros.
- Songwriter: Matt Bellamy
- Producers: Rich Costey; Muse

"Algorithm" is a song by English rock band Muse. It was released as the first track from the band's eighth studio album, Simulation Theory, on 9 November 2018. "Algorithm" is a retro-futuristic and industrial sounding song, in common with the overall theme of Simulation Theory.

== Release ==
The name of the song was first mentioned by lead singer Matt Bellamy while speaking with Matt Wilkinson on Beats 1 Radio on 16 February 2018. According to Bellamy, the song blends classical romantic piano with 1980s synths and computer game music. Q magazine published a preview of Simulation Theory on 23 October, in which they stated that "opener "Algorithm" sounds like it could be from Daft Punk's Tron: Legacy soundtrack, a fusion of dramatic strings and industrial electro."

== Writing and recording ==
Lead singer Bellamy said regarding "Algorithm" that "it’s about an intelligence, be it human or artificial, that realises that it lives in a simulated reality, and it is controlled by its creator. It feels betrayed, finds this situation unfair and tries to escape". In another interview, Bellamy said that "Algorithm" and "The Dark Side" deal with the struggle to get away from a dystopian world and anxieties about technology.

Bellamy has stated that "Algorithm" is his favourite track from Simulation Theory "because it's an interesting combination of retro-synth and futuristic stuff". The song has been compared by various reviewers to "Apocalypse Please" and "Supremacy", and by Muse fans to "Take A Bow" and "The Dark Side".

== Music video ==
A short preview of the "Algorithm" music video was first shown by Bellamy on his smartphone during an interview on Virgin Radio in Milan two days prior to the release. Actor Terry Crews makes a second appearance in a Simulation Theory music video, following on from his role as protagonist of the music video for "Pressure".

== Charts ==
Chart (2018)	Peak position
France (SNEP)	137
New Zealand (RMNZ)	38
Portugal (AFP)	93
Switzerland (Schweizer Hitparade)	52
UK Singles (Official Charts)	97
