= Muse – Simulation Theory =

2020 concert film

- Official poster
- Directed by: Lance Drake
- Based on: Simulation Theory by Muse
- Produced by: Muse; Pulse Films; Lance Drake; Jesse-Lee Stout
- Starring: Matt Bellamy; Dominic Howard; Chris Wolstenholme; Morgan Nicholls
- Edited by: Jeremiah Mayhew
- Music by: Muse
- Distributed by: Warner Bros.
- Release date: 17 August 2020
- Running time: 90 minutes
- Country: United Kingdom
- Language: English

Muse – Simulation Theory is a concert film by English rock band Muse, based on their 2018 album Simulation Theory and its supporting tour in 2019. Directed by Lance Drake, it was released on 17 August 2020 in a one-night only worldwide IMAX release, with a download and streaming release on 21 August.

The film combines live concert footage from Muse's shows at the O2 Arena in London from 14 to 15 September 2019, which were part of their worldwide Simulation Theory World Tour that took place throughout 2019, with more traditionally filmed scenes that take place in between and during songs, making up the film's narrative.

== Synopsis ==
=== Concert footage ===
The film primarily consists of live concert footage of Muse's shows at the London O2 Arena in September 2019, with an overarching narrative tying the songs together. The songs featured in the film primarily focus on songs from the Simulation Theory album, but multiple other songs from previous Muse albums are also included, as well as additional film pieces composed by Matt Bellamy. Some songs were shortened and re-ordered from how they were played live for the film, and multiple songs performed were omitted. The omitted songs included; "Plug in Baby", "Hysteria", "The 2nd Law: Unsustainable", "Time is Running Out", "Reapers" and "Knights of Cydonia".

Track listing

1. "Algorithm" (Alternate Reality version)
2. "Pressure"
3. "Drill Sergeant" / "Psycho"
4. "Break It to Me"
5. "Pray (High Valyrian)"
6. "The Dark Side"
7. "Supermassive Black Hole"
8. "Thought Contagion"
9. "Uprising"
10. "Propaganda"
11. "Madness"
12. "The Void"
13. "Dig Down" (Acoustic Gospel Version)
14. "Mercy"
15. "Take a Bow"
16. "Prelude" / "Starlight"
17. "Algorithm"
18. "Metal Medley" (Extracts from "Stockholm Syndrome", "The Handler", "Assassin" and "New Born")

=== Plot ===
A group of scientists is sent to investigate a mysterious source producing unknown paranormal activity, which leads them to a concert stage located in London with an arcade cabinet on it. One of the scientists called Murphy, touches the cabinet, causing him to break the fabric of his reality and be transported into another one where he finds himself in the crowd of a live Muse concert. After being pulled back to his reality, he is then bitten by a mysterious phantom, causing him to become infected with an unknown pathogen and mutate into a monster. A mysterious woman then appears and reveals that she is an NPC from the "mainframe". The NPC explains that due to a tear in their reality, a deadly virus has been released and a new entity, known as the "Truth Slayer", is being created.

The media reports on the virus and large sections of London are quarantined off to curb the infection rate, with multiple NPCs coming to fight off the infected people. The NPC then takes control of the news broadcasts and puts words in their mouths, stating that the virus is a hoax and that "there is nothing to fear". The Truth Slayer then breaks out of his containment and a hero, known as "The One" (Matt Bellamy), enters the same reality to stop him from gaining control of more. The One gains access to the mainframe, gains the power of a glove, and confronts the Truth Slayer. After a climactic battle, The One prevails and defeats the Truth Slayer. The NPC closes the film by stating that while The One may have saved this reality, there are more.

== Production and release ==
Muse's performances at the O2 Arena, London, on 14–15 September 2019 were filmed. Both the concert footage and the additional narrative scenes were directed by Lance Drake, who had previously worked with the band, directing the music videos for all 5 of the singles from Simulation Theory. Bellamy described the film as Muse's version of Pink Floyd – The Wall (1982), combining musical and dramatic scenes. It was planned for a general cinematic release, but this was abandoned due to the COVID-19 pandemic.

The film was announced on 11 August 2020 and was scheduled for release on 17 August 2020 in a one-night only IMAX cinema release, with a download and streaming release a few days later on 21 August. Two deluxe edition box-sets of the film were also announced for release on 11 December 2020; both sets contain a Blu-ray of the film with a 5.1 DTS-HD Master Audio mix packed in a VHS-inspired box, a vinyl LP and Compact Cassette containing selected tracks from the film as well as a comic of the film's story among other items.

== Cast and crew ==
=== Cast ===
==== Musicians ====
- Matt Bellamy – lead vocals, guitars, piano, synthesizers on "Algorithm"
- Chris Wolstenholme – bass, backing vocals, guitar on "Dig Down (Acoustic Gospel Version)", percussion on "Pray (High Valyrian)"
- Dominic Howard – electric and acoustic drums, percussion, backing vocals on "Supermassive Black Hole", synthesizers on "Take a Bow"
- Morgan Nicholls – keyboards, synthesizers, backing vocals, percussion including cabasa on "Supermassive Black Hole", guitar on "Uprising", "Mercy" and "Starlight"
