= Simulation Theory World Tour =

2019 concert tour by Muse

- World tour by Muse
- Promotional poster for the tour
- Associated album: Simulation Theory
- Start date: 22 February 2019
- End date: 15 October 2019
- Legs: 4
- No. of shows: 21 in North America; 30 in Europe; 1 in Asia; 7 in Latin America; 59 total
- Attendance: 1,308,531 (55 shows)
- Box office: $102.3 million (55 shows)

Muse concert chronology
- Drones World Tour (2015–16); Simulation Theory World Tour (2019); Will of the People World Tour (2022–23)

The Simulation Theory World Tour was a world concert tour by English rock band Muse, in support of their eighth studio album, Simulation Theory (2018). The tour began in Houston, Texas on 22 February 2019 and ended in Lima, Peru on 15 October 2019. Numerous acts appeared as the opening act, including Tom Morello, Walk the Moon, Nothing But Thieves and SWMRS.

The tour grossed $102.3 million, with more than 1.3 million tickets sold, based on 55 reported dates.

Muse – Simulation Theory, a film containing live footage from the shows at The O2 Arena in London from 14 to 15 September 2019, as well as additional filmed scenes, was released on 17 August 2020 in IMAX cinemas worldwide with a digital download release on 21 August.

== Background ==
The Simulation Theory World Tour featured a new enhanced experience package that allowed access to an exclusive mixed reality pre-show party, powered by Microsoft. This included three original virtual reality games, inspired by tracks from Simulation Theory. Additional enhanced experience perks included a premium concert ticket, show-specific poster, interactive photo experience with props and memorabilia from the band's latest videos, and more.

== Staging and Production ==
The staging was similar to The Unsustainable Tour of 2013, with a few differences. It consisted of a main stage, two stage wings and a long catwalk to the B-Stage, where certain songs were played from throughout the show. Behind the stage there was a large LED screen displaying various visuals. During the Metal Medley near the end of the show, a large inflatable puppet skeleton called "Murph", similar to ones seen in the music video for "The Dark Side", was featured as if it were towering over the stage. The show also featured 14 dancers performing throughout the show during certain songs – some again linking to the music videos for the album.

The show loosely told the story of being caged in simulations with the world battling back and defeating them with the "creator" at the end of the show. This narrative was expanded upon in the Simulation Theory film with additional scenes.

== Setlist ==
1. "Algorithm" (Alternate Reality version)
2. "Pressure"
3. "Drill Sergeant" + "Psycho"
4. "Break It to Me"
5. "Uprising"
6. "Propaganda"
7. "Plug in Baby"
8. "Pray (High Valyrian)" (Matt Bellamy cover)
9. "The Dark Side"
10. "Supermassive Black Hole"
11. "Thought Contagion"
12. "Interlude" + "Hysteria"
13. "The 2nd Law: Unsustainable"
14. "Dig Down" (Acoustic Gospel Version)
15. "Madness"
16. "Mercy"
17. "Time is Running Out"
18. "Houston Jam" (drum and bass jam, with "Futurism", "Unnatural Selection" and "Micro Cuts" riffs)
19. "Take a Bow"
20. "Prelude" + "Starlight"

Encore

21. "Algorithm"
22. "Metal Medley" (Extracts from "Stockholm Syndrome", "Assassin", "Reapers", "The Handler", "New Born")
23. "Man with a Harmonica" + "Knights of Cydonia"
Notes
- "Undisclosed Desires" was occasionally played at outdoor gigs from the European Leg onwards, being played after Dig Down.
- "Bliss" was occasionally played at outdoor gigs from the European leg onwards, being played after Hysteria.
- "The Void" was played on the 12, 14 and 15 September 2019, being played after "Dig Down".
- "Showbiz" was played at a few shows at the end of the tour after "Hysteria", mostly due to high fan demand for the song.
- "Metal Medley" was not played at the concert in Buenos Aires on 11 October 2019, due to poor weather.
- "Houston Jam" and "Take a Bow" were both skipped in the Latin American leg of the tour, being only performed in Mexico City.

== Personnel ==
- Matt Bellamy - lead vocals, guitars, piano, synthesizers on "Algorithm"
- Chris Wolstenholme - bass, backing vocals, guitar on "Dig Down (Acoustic Gospel Version)", percussion on "Pray (High Valyrian)", harmonica on "Man with a Harmonica"
- Dominic Howard - electric & acoustic drums, percussion, backing vocals on "Supermassive Black Hole", synthesizers on "Take a Bow"
- Morgan Nicholls - keyboards, synthesizers, backing vocals, percussion including cabasa on "Supermassive Black Hole", guitar on "Uprising", "Thought Contagion", "Mercy", & "Starlight"

== Shows ==
List of concerts, showing date, city, country, venue, opening act, tickets sold, number of available tickets and amount of gross revenue
Date	City	Country	Venue	Opening act	Attendance	Revenue
Leg 1 — North America
22 February 2019	Houston	United States	Toyota Center	Walk the Moon	7,092	$538,042
24 February 2019	Dallas	United States	American Airlines Center	Walk the Moon	8,727	$660,719
26 February 2019	Phoenix	United States	Talking Stick Resort Arena	Walk the Moon	7,706	$604,356
28 February 2019	Salt Lake City	United States	Vivint Smart Home Arena	Walk the Moon	7,064	$522,140
2 March 2019	Las Vegas	United States	Mandalay Bay Events Center	Walk the Moon	8,084	$656,610
5 March 2019	San Diego	United States	Pechanga Arena	Walk the Moon	9,315	$698,359
7 March 2019	Sacramento	United States	Golden 1 Center	Walk the Moon	5,781	$468,832
9 March 2019	Oakland	United States	Oracle Arena	Walk the Moon	11,242	$960,794
11 March 2019	Inglewood	United States	The Forum	Walk the Moon	12,662	$1,096,514
23 March 2019	Austin	United States	Austin 360 Amphitheater	Walk the Moon	—	—
24 March 2019	Sunrise	United States	BB&T Center	Walk the Moon	6,902	$543,793
26 March 2019	Atlanta	United States	State Farm Arena	Walk the Moon	6,513	$551,203
28 March 2019	Toronto	Canada	Scotiabank Arena	Walk the Moon	11,352	$682,726
30 March 2019	Montreal	Canada	Bell Centre	Walk the Moon	15,930	$968,738
31 March 2019	Quebec City	Canada	Videotron Centre	Walk the Moon	13,127	$732,281
2 April 2019	Washington, D.C.	United States	Capital One Arena	SWMRS	11,271	$868,582
4 April 2019	Detroit	United States	Little Caesars Arena	Walk the Moon	11,168	$541,958
7 April 2019	Philadelphia	United States	Wells Fargo Center	SWMRS	10,557	$708,322
8 April 2019	New York	United States	Madison Square Garden	Walk the Moon	12,426	$984,373
10 April 2019	Boston	United States	TD Garden	Walk the Moon	10,067	$827,792
12 April 2019	Chicago	United States	United Center	Walk the Moon	12,035	$953,843
Leg 2 — Europe
26 May 2019	Prague	Czech Republic	Letňany Airport	The Atavists; Imodium	32,987 / 35,093	$2,251,588
28 May 2019	Budapest	Hungary	László Papp Sports Arena	Dinosaur Pile-Up	11,271 / 12,386	$868,582
29 May 2019	Graz	Austria	Stadthalle Graz	Dinosaur Pile-Up	14,365 / 14,658	$1,029,318
1 June 2019	London	England	London Stadium	Tom Morello; Pale Waves	72,721 / 72,721	$6,652,663
5 June 2019	Bristol	England	Ashton Gate Stadium	Tom Morello; Pale Waves	23,579 / 23,579	$2,068,648
8 June 2019 (Note: Due to a medical emergency, Pale Waves were forced to cut their set short. As a result both Tom Morello and Muse were delayed.)	Manchester	England	Etihad Stadium	Tom Morello; Pale Waves	43,128 / 43,128	$3,732,041
12 June 2019	Riga	Latvia	Arena Riga	Kiefer Sutherland	8,962 / 11,203	$902,904
15 June 2019	Moscow	Russia	Luzhniki Stadium	Kiefer Sutherland	46,340 / 56,512	$3,683,656
18 June 2019	Helsinki	Finland	Suvilahti	Kiefer Sutherland; The Amazons	15,979 / 15,979	$1,407,586
22 June 2019	Kraków	Poland	Tauron Arena	Allusinlove	14,222 / 14,222	$1,182,544
27 June 2019	Nijmegen	Netherlands	Goffertpark	SWMRS; Andy Burrows	65,004 / 65,661	$4,276,518
29 June 2019	Cologne	Germany	RheinEnergieStadion	Andy Burrows; The Amazons	40,400 / 42,526	$3,113,013
30 June 2019 (Note: The concert on 30 June 2019 at Werchter Festival Park in Werchter was part of Rock Werchter festival.)	Werchter	Belgium	Werchter Festivalpark	—N/a	—N/a	—N/a
3 July 2019	Zürich	Switzerland	Hallenstadion	SWMRS	13,300 / 13,300	$1,792,981
5 July 2019	Saint-Denis	France	Stade de France	Weezer; Mini Mansions	131,321 / 147,552	$12,225,296
6 July 2019	Saint-Denis	France	Stade de France	SWMRS; Mini Mansions	131,321 / 147,552	$12,225,296
9 July 2019	Marseille	France	Stade Vélodrome	SWMRS; Mini Mansions	55,330 / 55,330	$4,432,254
12 July 2019	Milan	Italy	San Siro	Mini Mansions; The Amazons	89,619 / 103,010	$6,158,308
13 July 2019	Milan	Italy	San Siro	Mini Mansions; Nic Cester	89,619 / 103,010	$6,158,308
16 July 2019	Bordeaux	France	Matmut Atlantique	Mini Mansions; Nic Cester	38,613 / 38,613	$3,063,978
20 July 2019	Rome	Italy	Stadio Olimpico	Mini Mansions; Nic Cester	50,385 / 50,385	$3,506,064
24 July 2019	Lisbon	Portugal	Passeio Maritimo de Alges	Miles Kane; Mini Mansions	—	—
26 July 2019	Madrid	Spain	Wanda Metropolitano	Mini Mansions; Nic Cester	50,719 / 50,719	$4,083,636
7 September 2019	Oslo	Norway	Telenor Arena	Des Rocs	12,666 / 18,357	$937,001
8 September 2019	Copenhagen	Denmark	Royal Arena	Des Rocs	—	—
10 September 2019	Berlin	Germany	Mercedes-Benz Arena	Des Rocs	12,500 / 13.441	$1,055,850
12 September 2019	Amsterdam	Netherlands	Ziggo Dome	Des Rocs	—	—
14 September 2019	London	England	The O_{2} Arena	Nothing But Thieves	30,600 / 34,773	$3,032,640
15 September 2019	London	England	The O_{2} Arena	Nothing But Thieves	30,600 / 34,773	$3,032,640
17 September 2019	Birmingham	England	Arena Birmingham	Nothing But Thieves	13,191 / 13,741	$1,192,030
Leg 3 — Asia
21 September 2019	Singapore		Marina Bay Street Circuit	Gwen Stefani; Fatboy Slim	—N/a	—N/a
Leg 4 — Latin America
2 October 2019	Mexico City	Mexico	Foro Sol	The Ruse	94,400 / 122,597	$4,968,447
3 October 2019	Mexico City	Mexico	Foro Sol	The Ruse	94,400 / 122,597	$4,968,447
6 October 2019 (Note: The concert on 6 October 2019 at Barra Olympic Park in Rio de Janeiro was part of Rock in Rio festival.)	Rio de Janeiro	Brazil	Barra Olympic Park	—N/a	—N/a	—N/a
9 October 2019	São Paulo	Brazil	Ginásio do Ibirapuera (Note: The concert in São Paulo on 9 October 2019 was originally scheduled in the Allianz Parque but it was moved to the Ginásio do Ibirapuera for undisclosed reasons.)	Kaiser Chiefs	8,480 / 8,480	$452,603
11 October 2019	Buenos Aires	Argentina	Hipódromo de Palermo	Airbag; Kaiser Chiefs	14,378 / 17,973	$660,211
13 October 2019	Santiago	Chile	Pista Atletica	Kaiser Chiefs	15,701 / 18,692	$1,114,378
15 October 2019	Lima	Peru	Jockey Club del Peru	Kaiser Chiefs	18,154 / 24,868	$1,447,698
Total					1,308,531	$102,357,939 (55 shows)
