= The Dark Side (song) =

Single by Muse

from the album Simulation Theory
- Released: 30 August 2018
- Recorded: 2018
- Studio: AIR (London)
- Genre: Hard rock; electropop
- Length: 3:47
- Label: Warner; Helium-3
- Songwriter: Matt Bellamy
- Producers: Rich Costey; Muse

Muse singles chronology
"Something Human" (2018)	"The Dark Side" (2018)	"Pressure" (2018)

Music video
- "The Dark Side" on YouTube

"The Dark Side" is a song by English rock band Muse. It was released as a single on 30 August 2018 as the fourth single from Simulation Theory, their eighth studio album.

== Release ==
The name of the fourth single to be released ahead of Muse's then-unnamed eighth studio album was first teased in the music video for previous single "Something Human", which was released on 19 July 2018. In the music video for "Something Human", lead singer Matt Bellamy can be seen driving a Lamborghini Countach which featured the vehicle registration plate "DRKSIDE". Subsequently, on 30 August 2018, the name of the upcoming album was revealed to be Simulation Theory and its release date was confirmed; later that day, Muse released "The Dark Side" as the surprise next single from the album.

== Composition ==
"The Dark Side" is an operatic hard rock song with an electropop edge, more traditional of Muse than the album's previous singles. Travis Lausch of Ultimate Guitar compared its "funky stomp" to that of "Supermassive Black Hole."

== Music video ==
The music video for "The Dark Side", released on the same day as the single, continues the running theme of the previous music videos from Simulation Theory, picking up where the music video for previous single "Something Human" ends.

In the video, Bellamy is seen driving a Lamborghini Countach supercar through the dystopian cyberpunk landscape which first appeared at the end of the "Something Human" music video, after he crashed through a wormhole in a collision with a police car which had been pursuing him. This dystopian world, one of many simulated realities featured in Simulation Theory music videos, is populated by giant robots attempting to kill or capture Bellamy as he attempts to understand or overcome the simulations; these robots are later revealed to be Murph, the giant robot which appeared above the stage during the finale of Simulation Theory World Tour concerts. Bellamy swerves the car to avoid the robots as they break through the ground in an attempt to reach him, before driving into the mouth of one of them and observing its brain. He then escapes the robot, ramming the car through the back of its skull, and landing on a bridge which passes many deactivated robots on his way to a futuristic neon city; he reaches the safety of the city just as the robots begin to wake up and destroy the bridge behind him.

== Personnel ==
Credits adapted from Tidal.

Muse

- Matt Bellamy – lead vocals, guitars, keyboards, production, composition, songwriting
- Chris Wolstenholme – bass, backing vocals, production
- Dominic Howard – drums, production

Production

- Rich Costey – production
- Adam Hawkins – engineering
- Aleks Von Korff – assistant engineering
- Rob Bisel – assistant engineering
- Tyler Beans – assistant engineering
- Spike Stent – mixing
- Michael Freeman – mixing
- Pete Winfield – mixing

== Charts ==
Chart (2018)	Peak position
Belgium (Ultratip Bubbling Under Flanders)	22
Belgium (Ultratip Bubbling Under Wallonia)	20
France (SNEP)	115
Netherlands Single Tip (MegaCharts)	14
Portugal (AFP)	75
Switzerland (Schweizer Hitparade)	74
UK Singles Downloads (OCC)	64
UK Singles Sales (OCC)	64
US Hot Rock & Alternative Songs (Billboard)	32
