= Simulation Theory (album) =

2018 studio album by Muse

Studio album by Muse
- Released: 9 November 2018
- Recorded: January 2017 – August 2018
- Studio: AIR Lyndhurst (London)
- Genres: Electronic rock; new wave; alternative rock; pop rock; synth-pop
- Length: 42:12
- Labels: Warner Bros.; Helium-3
- Producers: Rich Costey; Mike Elizondo; Muse; Shellback; Timbaland

Muse chronology
Drones (2015)	Simulation Theory (2018)	Origin of Muse (2019)

Singles from Simulation Theory
- 1. "Dig Down" Released: 18 May 2017; 2. "Thought Contagion" Released: 15 February 2018; 3. "Something Human" Released: 19 July 2018; 4. "The Dark Side" Released: 30 August 2018; 5. "Pressure" Released: 27 September 2018

Simulation Theory is the eighth studio album by the English rock band Muse. It was released on 9 November 2018 through Warner Bros. Records and Helium-3. Muse co-produced the album with Rich Costey, Mike Elizondo, Shellback and Timbaland. Following the darker themes of Muse's prior albums, Simulation Theory incorporates lighter influences from science fiction and 1980s pop culture, with extensive use of synthesisers. The contemporary political climate of the United States informed the lyrics.

Rather than working on the album as a whole, Muse focused on recording a single track at a time. Recording began at AIR Studios in London in early 2017 with Elizondo, before embarking on a tour of North America. Production restarted in Los Angeles in late 2017 with Costey, who previously produced Muse's albums Absolution (2003) and Black Holes and Revelations (2006).

The album cover, designed by Stranger Things artist Kyle Lambert, and its music videos homage 1980s pop culture such as Back to the Future, Michael Jackson's Thriller, and Teen Wolf. Simulation Theory was preceded by the release of singles "Dig Down", "Thought Contagion", "Something Human", "The Dark Side", and "Pressure", along with a 2018 festival tour of North America. It was released in a standard edition alongside two deluxe editions featuring alternate versions of its tracks. A world tour of North America, Europe and South America took place in 2019 to support the album. The album received generally mixed reviews, but became the band's sixth consecutive album to top the UK Albums Chart. A film based on the album and tour, Muse – Simulation Theory, was released in August 2020. As of November 2022, Simulation Theory has sold over one million copies worldwide.

== Background ==
Following the conclusion of the Drones World Tour, Muse and tour director Glen Rowe expressed an eagerness to design a new more ambitious tour, but with a different musical direction. Singer and guitarist Matt Bellamy entertained the possibility of experimenting with hip hop or making another attempt at creating a stripped-back acoustic sound. Drummer Dominic Howard suggested that the band might release singles or EPs to target audiences who did not listen to albums.

== Composition ==
Musically, Simulation Theory has been described as featuring electronic rock, new wave, alternative rock, pop rock, synth-pop and electro-funk. Lyrically, it explores the role of simulation in society and the simulation hypothesis, which proposes that reality is a simulation. Biographer Mark Beaumont wrote that it would likely be songwriter Matt Bellamy's "dissection of the idea that we're all just lumps of code in the shape of unusually lumpy sims". In contrast to the darker themes of Muse's previous albums, Simulation Theory takes on a lighter science fiction theme, with "fantasy becoming real" cited by Bellamy as a core idea.

The band wanted to blend elements of different eras, citing the music of Lana Del Rey, who mixes '50s-style music with lyrics concerning modern concepts in songs such as "Video Games", as an example. The opening track, "Algorithm", features a musical juxtaposition between classical piano and '80s synthesizers and chiptunes. "Something Human" is a song inspired by folk pop written to counteract the "dark vibe" of Drones and the Drones World Tour. Bellamy described it as a "tender, down-to-earth, simplistic song" that describes the burnout and homesickness he felt towards the end of the tour. "Pressure" is a power pop track with contrasting horns and guitars, reminiscent of nerd rock. The song features several interchanging riffs.

"Dig Down", one of the first songs written, is a reaction to the social and political climate following the Brexit referendum and the 2016 US presidential election, hoping to "give inspiration, optimism and hope to people to fight for the causes they believe in." "Thought Contagion" was written in late 2017 following the band's move to Los Angeles, California, and the restart of production. The verses stem from Bellamy's anxieties observing American news at the time; its chorus recalls Bellamy's concerns about the power misinformed or ideological people have over their audiences. The track's title was inspired by scientist Richard Dawkins, who compared the spread of thoughts, "regardless of their accuracy and truth", to a viral disease. "The Void" was used for the opening titles of the 2019 BBC/PBC documentary series The Planets.

== Recording ==
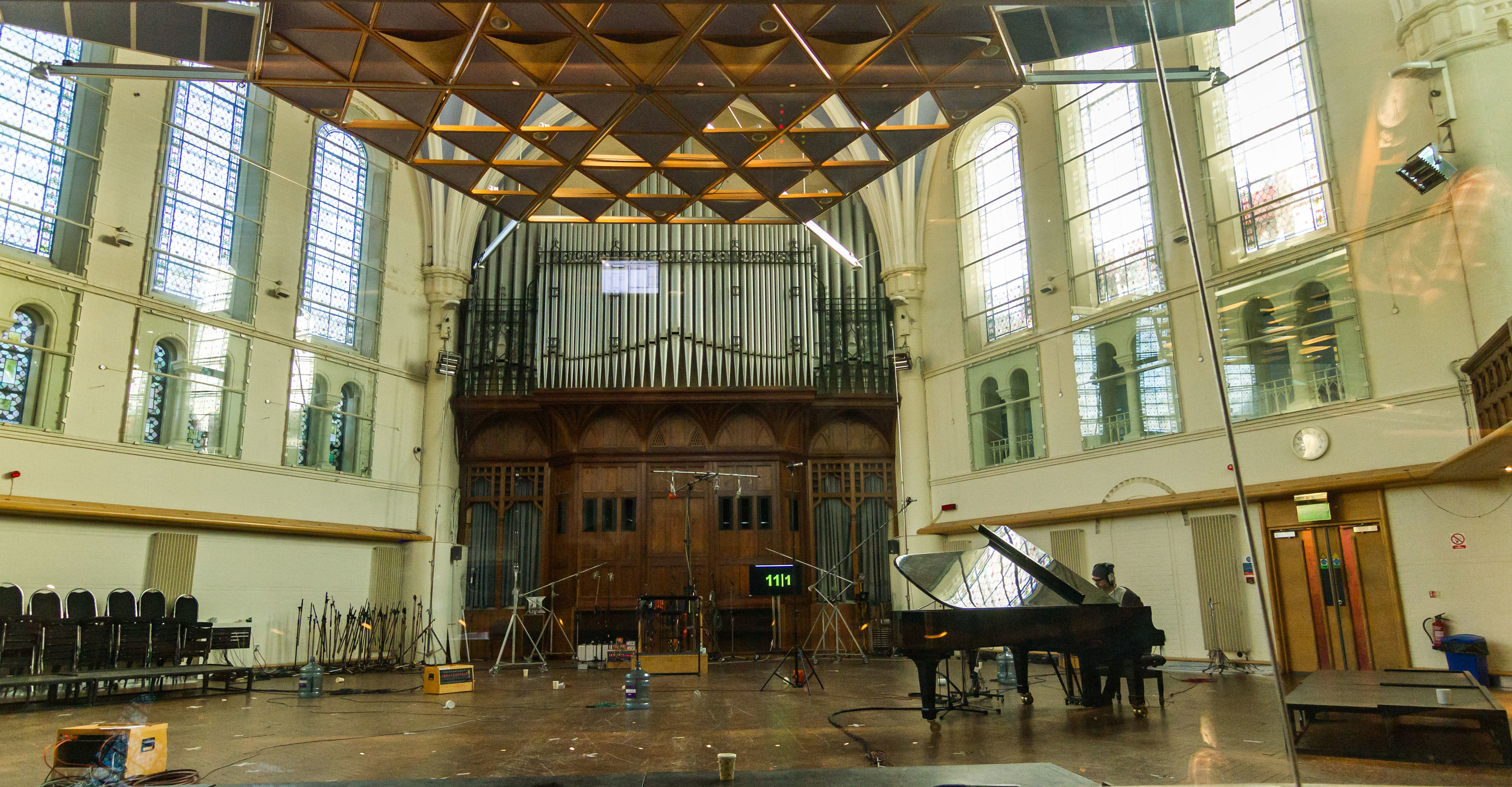
AIR Studios in London, England, where the first recording sessions for Simulation Theory took place in early 2017.

Muse began writing and recording their eighth studio album following the conclusion of the Drones World Tour in late 2016. The band spent time at AIR Studios in London, England, with producer Mike Elizondo until they left to embark on a tour of North America with PVRIS and Thirty Seconds to Mars in May 2017. Three tracks were written and recorded during these sessions; information that had been relayed by the band to a fan that visited them at AIR Studios in March 2017. One of the tracks, "Dig Down", was released following the conclusion of these sessions in May 2017. At the end of the tour, the band moved to Los Angeles, California, to restart production, this time with collaborator Rich Costey, who co-produced Absolution and Black Holes and Revelations.

I think for the last two or three albums, we've always been thinking about the whole. [...] It was nice to remind ourselves to just think about a song. What makes a song great?

— Matt Bellamy, Rolling Stone

Rather than concentrating on the album as a whole, as they had on previous albums, Muse focused on recording and mixing one track at a time. The band hoped this would improve the individual quality of the songs, and they worked with no particular theme in mind, even halfway through its production.

One of the first tracks produced with Costey was "Thought Contagion", based on a bassline and theremin melody conceived by Bellamy. The band began recording it in November, and replaced the theremin with a ten-layer vocal chorus performed by Bellamy and bassist Chris Wolstenholme. The verses were originally intended to be supported by a heavier, arena-style drum sequence, before experimentation with programming led to a trap-inspired drum sound that emulated the Roland TR-808. The folk rock-inspired track "Something Human" was also co-produced with Costey. Shellback and Timbaland also co-produced tracks.

== Artwork ==
The album cover for the "Super Deluxe" edition of Simulation Theory, illustrated by Paul Shipper.

The album cover for Simulation Theory was designed by British visual artist Kyle Lambert, who had worked on Netflix’s television series Stranger Things. It was created using Procreate on an iPad Pro with Apple Pencil, and features a retro style focused on 1980s aesthetics. This art style prompted comparisons by critics to Lambert's earlier work and similar aesthetics used in both 1980s and contemporary media. The cover for the "super deluxe" version was designed by Paul Shipper, who had designed the Dolby Cinema posters for Walt Disney Studios Motion Pictures films such as Star Wars: The Last Jedi and Avengers: Infinity War. It features an array of characters, including members of the band, in a stylistic arrangement similar to Shipper's previous work.

== Promotion ==
In April 2017, Muse shared footage from their early studio sessions on social media, with captions teasing new material "coming soon". More cryptic teasers were published in the weeks following. The first product of the sessions, "Dig Down", was released on 18 May 2017, along with a music video. The song became the opening song on the band's 2017 North American tour.

After the band's return to the studio, Muse teased "Thought Contagion" as their next release, and teased several more tracks to follow. "Thought Contagion" was released on 15 February 2018 with its accompanying music video. Muse continued to post in-studio footage on social media in the weeks following. The band also headlined a number of festivals in the United States in 2018, including Bonnaroo, BottleRock, and Carolina Rebellion festivals.

Muse announced the album release date on 20 July 2018, alongside the lead single "Something Human". The title, tracklist and cover art were announced on 30 August 2018. The "deluxe" and "super deluxe" editions feature alternative versions of songs, referred to as "alternate reality versions", including a version of "Pressure" performed by the UCLA Bruin Marching Band, a gospel rendition of "Dig Down", a live version of "Thought Contagion" and acoustic renditions of "Propaganda", "Something Human", and "The Void". A fourth single, "The Dark Side", was released on 30 August, followed by "Pressure" on 27 September.

=== Music videos ===
Muse planned to produce music videos for all eleven tracks on Simulation Theory, forming a narrative focused on "digital containment and escape". Like the album, the videos are science fiction-themed, with 1980s-inspired aesthetics and effects. Each video was directed by American filmmaker Lance Drake, noted for his work with Miike Snow and Twin Shadow.

The first video, "Dig Down", stars model and former athlete Lauren Wasser attempting to escape a high-security facility. The action-heavy video is a literal interpretation of the song's lyrics, based on Wasser's publicised experience with toxic shock syndrome. Drake had intended to film a video with Wasser starring prior to his involvement with Muse, and "Dig Down"'s themes of unity and survival inspired him to create a story centered around her. Bellamy appears in the video through cathode ray tube television sets dressed as 80s cyberpunk character Max Headroom. The second video, "Thought Contagion", references the 1983 music video Michael Jackson's Thriller, with a love story involving a vampire antagonist illustrated through choreography and neon lighting. Muse held an open casting call for dancers and extras for the video, welcoming "super edgy" punk characters with "wild hair", tattoos, and piercings.

The third video, "Something Human", follows Bellamy as he attempts to return a VHS cassette to a video rental shop before turning into a werewolf, while being chased by police portrayed by bandmates Dominic Howard and Chris Wolstenholme. Drake aimed to create an "epic journey" out of a simple task, such as returning a tape, while continuing the narrative of the previous two videos. Continuing the 1980s-inspired visual style, the video takes place in a simulation, and makes more direct references to 80s media, such as Back to the Future and Teen Wolf; films that Bellamy had enjoyed during his childhood and wanted to recall as part of the video's simulation setting. The following video, "The Dark Side", continues where the ending of "Something Human" left off and features Bellamy driving through a simulated dystopian landscape populated by giant robots. The video has invited comparisons to Cyberpunk and Grand Theft Auto: Vice City by critics. The fifth music video, "Pressure", continues the 1980s pop culture references, and stars the band as performing as Rocket Baby Dolls (Muse's original band name) at a homecoming dance akin to a scene from Back to the Future, and Terry Crews as a chaperone who uses a Ghostbusters-esque proton pack to subdue an outbreak of gremlin-like creatures. Critics also identified homages to Critters, the work of John Hughes, and Stranger Things. A film based on the album and tour, Muse – Simulation Theory, was released in August 2020.

=== Tour ===
In September 2018, Muse revealed through a post on Twitter the name of twenty cities in North America and seventeen cities in Europe that the band intended to visit on their Simulation Theory World Tour. In the same post, the band promised early access to tickets for the tour for people who pre-ordered the album. Technology was a focus in the design of the tour, with an intent to showcase "something that no one's ever seen before". Early ideas for the tour included a system of magnets that would allow the band to levitate without wires. The tour began in Houston on 22 February 2019, and ended on 15 October 2019, in Lima.

Multiple bands played in the opening act, such as Tom Morello, Walk the Moon and SWMRS. The shows on 14 and 15 September at The O2 Arena, London were filmed.

== Critical reception ==
Professional ratings
Aggregate scores
Source	Rating
AnyDecentMusic?	5.6/10
Metacritic	63/100
Review scores
Source	Rating
AllMusic	3.5/5 stars
The Guardian	3/5 stars
The Independent	2/5 stars
Mojo	3/5 stars
NME	4/5 stars
The Observer	3/5 stars
Pitchfork	6.0/10
Q	3/5 stars
Rolling Stone	2/5 stars
Uncut	8/10

Simulation Theory received generally mixed reviews. At Metacritic, which assigns a normalised rating out of 100 to reviews from mainstream critics, Simulation Theory has an average score of 63 based on 19 reviews. AllMusic's Neil. Z Yeung praised the combination of electronic pop with "urgent, stadium rock foundation". Andrew Trendell of NME described the album as a "Tron-style pastiche of [Muse's] own adolescence", adding that "you'll be ashamed to tell anyone how much you love it."

The Guardian's Michael Hann wrote that the "less poppy moments are the most exciting", citing the arpeggios and power chords of "Blockades" and the "none-more-jackbooted" synth bassline and "urgent" strings of "Algorithm". Christopher R. Weingarten of Rolling Stone found that the lyrical mix of relationships and political themes resulted in a confusing message.

Yeung found Simulation Theory to be "the least complicated or overly conceptual [Muse album] in over a decade", and felt that "the orchestral and dubstep meandering of [Muse's] previous 2010s output" was absent. Trendell wrote that Muse present their "bombast" by "indulg[ing] their guiltiest pleasures" rather than through the "operatic prog" found in their previous albums, and Hann commented that producers such as Shellback and Timbaland found "a new face to Muse ... to a certain extent". DIY writer Will Richards saw Simulation Theory as a continuation of the "absurdities" of Drones and concluded: "If a Muse album isn't meant to make you laugh, gasp and double-take in its ridiculousness, then we don't wanna hear it."

== Track listing ==
All tracks are written by Matt Bellamy, except where noted.

Simulation Theory – Standard edition
No.	Title	Writer(s)	Producer(s)	Length
1.	"Algorithm"		Muse; Rich Costey	4:05
2.	"The Dark Side"		Muse; Costey	3:47
3.	"Pressure"		Muse; Costey	3:55
4.	"Propaganda"	Bellamy; Tim Mosley; Angel Lopez; Federico Vindver	Muse; Costey; Timbaland; Lopez; Vindver	3:00
5.	"Break It to Me"		Muse; Costey	3:37
6.	"Something Human"		Muse; Costey	3:46
7.	"Thought Contagion"		Muse; Costey	3:26
8.	"Get Up and Fight"	Bellamy; Johan Schuster	Shellback	4:04
9.	"Blockades"		Muse; Mike Elizondo	3:50
10.	"Dig Down"		Muse; Elizondo	3:48
11.	"The Void"		Muse; Costey	4:44
Total length:				42:12

Simulation Theory – Deluxe edition
No.	Title	Length
12.	"Algorithm" (Alternate Reality version)	3:32
13.	"The Dark Side" (Alternate Reality version)	3:54
14.	"Propaganda" (acoustic)	2:58
15.	"Something Human" (acoustic)	3:46
16.	"Dig Down" (acoustic gospel version)	3:57
Total length:		58:59

Simulation Theory – Super Deluxe edition
No.	Title	Length
12.	"Algorithm" (Alternate Reality version)	3:32
13.	"The Dark Side" (Alternate Reality version)	3:54
14.	"Pressure" (featuring the UCLA Bruin Marching Band)	4:04
15.	"Propaganda" (acoustic)	2:58
16.	"Break It to Me" (Sam de Jong remix)	3:08
17.	"Something Human" (acoustic)	3:46
18.	"Thought Contagion" (live)	4:08
19.	"Dig Down" (acoustic gospel version)	3:57
20.	"The Void" (acoustic)	4:34
21.	"The Dark Side" (Alternate Reality instrumental)	2:53
Total length:		78:56

== Personnel ==
Muse

- Matt Bellamy – lead vocals, guitars, keyboards; producer (all except 8), string and brass arrangements (tracks 1 and 3)
- Chris Wolstenholme – bass guitar, backing vocals; producer (all except 8)
- Dominic Howard – drums; producer (all except 8)

Additional musicians

- David Campbell – conducting (tracks 1, 3)
- Mike Elizondo – producer (tracks 9, 10), keyboard and programmer (track 10)
- Tove Lo – additional vocals (track 8)
- Shellback – producer, keyboard and programmer (track 8)

Production

- Laurence Anslow – assistant engineer (track 10)
- Brent Arrowood – assistant engineer (track 10)
- Tom Bailey – additional engineer (track 6)
- Tyler Beans – assistant engineer (track 1–3, 7), assistant producer (track 6)
- Jeremy Berman – "assistant" (track 1–3, 7)
- Rob Bisel – assistant engineer (track 2, 3, 7), assistant producer (track 6)
- Phillip Broussard – assistant engineer (track 10), assistant producer (track 6)
- Adrian Bushby – engineer (track 9), additional engineer (tracks 10, 11)
- Tommaso Colliva – engineer (track 4), additional engineer (track 6)
- Martin Cooke – assistant engineer (tracks 4, 7), assistant producer (track 6)
- Rich Costey – producer (track 1–7, 11), engineer (tracks 5, 6), mixing (tracks 1, 5, 11), mastering (track 7)
- Nick Fournier – assistant producer (track 6), assistant engineer (track 4)
- Michael Freeman – mixing (track 2, 6, 10)
- Chris Gehringer – mastering (track 7)
- Noah Goldstein – additional producer (track 6)
- Sam Grubbs – "assistant" [sic] (track 2, 3), assistant producer (track 7)
- Adam Hawkins – engineer (track 1–4, 6–8, 10, 11), mixing (track 3, 7, 9)
- Ted Jensen – mastering (track 10)
- Aleks Von Korff – assistant engineer (track 1–3, 7), assistant producer (track 6)
- Kyle Lambert, Paul Shippers – cover art
- Michael Limbert – engineer (track 8), mixing (track 8)
- Randy Merrill – mastering (track 6)
- Dylan Neustadter – "assistant" [sic] (track 2, 3), assistant producer (track 7)
- John Prestage – assistant engineer (track 10)
- Spike Stent – mixing (track 2, 4, 6, 10)
- Chris Whitemyer – "assistant" [sic] (track 3, 7)
- Colin Willard – "assistant" [sic] (track 3), assistant producer (track 7)
- Pete Winfield – additional mixing

== Charts ==
=== Weekly charts ===
Weekly chart performance for Simulation Theory
Chart (2018)	Peak position
Australian Albums (ARIA)	7
Austrian Albums (Ö3 Austria)	3
Belgian Albums (Ultratop Flanders)	2
Belgian Albums (Ultratop Wallonia)	1
Canadian Albums (Billboard)	3
Czech Albums (ČNS IFPI)	9
Danish Albums (Hitlisten)	16
Dutch Albums (Album Top 100)	1
Estonian Albums (Eesti Ekspress)	3
Finnish Albums (Suomen virallinen lista)	3
French Albums (SNEP)	3
German Albums (Offizielle Top 100)	4
Hungarian Albums (MAHASZ)	4
Irish Albums (IRMA)	5
Italian Albums (FIMI)	2
Japan Hot Albums (Billboard Japan)	17
Japanese Albums (Oricon)	15
Latvian Albums (LAIPA)	20
Mexican Albums (AMPROFON)	10
New Zealand Albums (RMNZ)	4
Norwegian Albums (VG-lista)	17
Polish Albums (ZPAV)	13
Portuguese Albums (AFP)	2
Scottish Albums (Official Charts)	1
Slovak Albums (ČNS IFPI)	11
Spanish Albums (Promusicae)	4
Swedish Albums (Sverigetopplistan)	17
Swiss Albums (Schweizer Hitparade)	1
UK Albums (Official Charts)	1
US Billboard 200	12
US Top Rock Albums (Billboard)	4

=== Year-end charts ===
Year-end chart performance for Simulation Theory
Chart (2018)	Position
Belgian Albums (Ultratop Flanders)	73
Belgian Albums (Ultratop Wallonia)	21
Dutch Albums (MegaCharts)	67
French Albums (SNEP)	50
Hungarian Albums (MAHASZ)	48
Italian Albums (FIMI)	72
Portuguese Albums (AFP)	65
Spanish Albums (PROMUSICAE)	71
Swiss Albums (Schweizer Hitparade)	16
UK Albums (OCC)	77

Chart (2019)	Position
Belgian Albums (Ultratop Flanders)	197
Belgian Albums (Ultratop Wallonia)	64
French Albums (SNEP)	118
Swiss Albums (Schweizer Hitparade)	88
US Top Album Sales (Billboard)	56
US Top Rock Albums (Billboard)	52

== Certifications ==
Sales certifications for Simulation Theory
Region	Certification	Certified units/sales
Canada (Music Canada)	Gold	40,000^{‡}
France (SNEP)	Platinum	100,000^{‡}
Italy (FIMI)	Gold	25,000^{‡}
Poland (ZPAV)	Gold	10,000^{‡}
United Kingdom (BPI)	Gold	100,000^{‡}
^{‡} Sales+streaming figures based on certification alone.
