= Sing for Absolution =

2004 single by Muse

- Standard artwork

Single by Muse

from the album Absolution
- B-side: "Fury"
- Released: 17 May 2004
- Studio: AIR (London)
- Genre: Alternative rock
- Length: 4:54 (album version); 3:42 (radio edit)
- Label: East West
- Composers: Matt Bellamy; Dominic Howard; Chris Wolstenholme
- Lyricist: Matt Bellamy
- Producers: Rich Costey; Muse

Muse singles chronology
"Hysteria" (2003)	"Sing for Absolution" (2004)	"Apocalypse Please" (2004)

Music video
- "Sing for Absolution" by Muse on YouTube

"Sing for Absolution" is a song by English rock band Muse, serving as the title track for their third studio album, Absolution (2003). It was released in May 2004 as the fourth single from that album, peaking at number 16 in the UK Singles Chart. The song also appears on the Absolution Tour DVD. A live acoustic version of the song serves as a B-side for the "Butterflies and Hurricanes" single.

== Background ==
"Sing for Absolution" is composed in the key of D minor, and moves at a slow tempo of 86 bpm. The song's vocal range spans from G_{3} to A_{4}. When performed live, the song is typically transposed down half a step, into C sharp minor; it was performed in its original key only in its earliest live appearances. The song was performed at most shows from 2003 to 2004 and occasionally in 2007. The song has not been performed since 2017.

Drummer Dominic Howard has said that the song is about finding absolution through singing and writing music, Dom said: The song "Sing For Absolution" is about the music writing and making music. This can also be a kind of absolution, but not in the religious sense intentioned. Absolution may mean that you will find an absoluteness or something positive. Through things you might not quite understand, or things that are strange or confusing things that you look at first as a negative singing, in other word, making music can be a way to understand these things. To pack in a context that makes them understandable.

== Music video ==
The music video for "Sing for Absolution" was produced by ARK of Sheffield, UK, and released in May 2004. It depicts a far future setting, beginning with a city residing populated exoplanet, firing missiles at a target. As the camera pans left, the viewer can see massive walls of ice that suggest the leading edge of an encroaching glacier. This is the apparent target for the missiles being fired. Shortly afterwards, it cuts to a larger view of the city itself, and following it, Muse is shown to be on a large spacecraft preparing for spaceflight. Leaving the atmosphere, they pass by space debris and an enormous video screen which features a beautiful, coyly smiling woman along with the message, "Be prepared... the ice age is coming".

Muse's rocket then docks with another spacecraft housing cryonics units intended to hold a large amount of people in suspended animation, named the "Cryo Module". It is currently holding hundreds of people in the said state of suspended animation as well, which is revealed in the extended version of the video. The spacecraft and its attached module shortly use a warp drive to travel a presumably long distance to low-earth orbit. The ship eventually exits into an asteroid field above the deserted Earth. The pilot (Bellamy) steers the ship to avoid colliding with the asteroids but ends up failing to completely avoid an especially large one. The cryonics collides with the asteroid, damaging the docking systems of both, leading them to lose control of their flight. The cryonics module is detached due to the damage of the docking systems, and the spacecraft gains speed as it enters the Earth's atmosphere. The air brakes on the ship are attempted to be deployed but causes both of the horizontal stabilizers to break off completely due to the stresses of atmospheric entry, and they promptly crash. The broken spacecraft slides a very large distance from the incredible speed, but manages to leave the crew and most of the airframe intact. The crew leave the spacecraft, as Muse is next seen standing on a cliff, looking out over a large landscape. As the camera zooms out, the Houses of Parliament and Big Ben in London are revealed, completely in ruin buried beneath large collections of dirt and sand. It can be speculated that they are the last remaining survivors on the planet, however, the final shot of the detached cryonics module drifting in space implies that the last surviving humans are actually those left frozen inside, ending the video on a darkly ironic note.

== Track listing ==
- 7" EW285, CD EW285CD
1. "Sing for Absolution" (full length US remix) – 5:01
2. "Fury" – 4:59
  - Previously released on the Japanese version of Absolution as a bonus track.
- DVD EW285DVD
1. "Sing for Absolution" (video)
2. "Sing for Absolution" (audio)
3. "Sing for Absolution" (making of the video)
4. "Big Day Off" (video)
5. Artwork Gallery of the band

== Charts ==
=== Weekly charts ===
Chart (2004)	Peak position
Belgium (Ultratip Bubbling Under Wallonia)	17
France (SNEP)	47
Italy (FIMI)	45
Netherlands (Dutch Top 40)	12
Netherlands (Single Top 100)	7
Scotland Singles (Official Charts)	18
UK Singles (Official Charts)	16
UK Rock & Metal (Official Charts)	3

=== Year-end charts ===
Chart (2004)	Position
Netherlands (Dutch Top 40)	94
Netherlands (Single Top 100)	43
