= Something Human =

Single by Muse

from the album Simulation Theory
- Released: 19 July 2018
- Recorded: 2017
- Genre: Electro-folk; indie pop
- Length: 3:46
- Label: Helium 3; Warner Bros.
- Songwriter: Matt Bellamy
- Producers: Rich Costey; Muse

Muse singles chronology
"Thought Contagion" (2018)	"Something Human" (2018)	"The Dark Side" (2018)

"Something Human" is a song by English rock band Muse. It was released as the third single from the band's eighth studio album, Simulation Theory. The track was released on 19 July 2018, following their previous single "Thought Contagion", which was released February of that year.

== Writing and recording ==
"Something Human" was the first song frontman Matt Bellamy wrote after the Drones World Tour. He has said that the song is about getting "a bit burnt out from being on the road for too long", and that it came as a natural result after playing the tour, as the song has a lighter tone than most of the songs on the band's previous album, Drones.

In another interview Bellamy stated that the inspiration for the stripped down style of the song came from a common cliché about Muse being over the top. Bellamy said that people "talk about how [Muse does] everything on such a big scale and over the top and crazy," and that he'd always wanted to "do something a bit more stripped down." Drummer Dominic Howard also chimed in saying "I just like the song a lot, it was literally the first thing I heard it was just Matt playing the guitar and singing it. So it’s a case of how are we going to do this? But I just really like the song, so we figured out how to turn it into what it is."

== Composition ==
"Something Human" is an electro-folk and indie pop ballad, with a country-inspired EDM sound, similar to Avicii's "Wake Me Up". Matt Bellamy described the song as "intimate" and a departure from the "dark and moody" Drones. On the deluxe versions of the album, an acoustic rendition of the song, with less electronic elements, was included.

== Promotion ==
The song was originally teased after the credits at the end of the Drones World Tour live film on 12 July 2018, with Bellamy posting an acoustic preview of the track on his Instagram the morning after.

== Music video ==
A music video for "Something Human" was released alongside the track on 19 July 2018. The video was directed by Lance Drake, who directed the music videos for the band's previous two singles, "Dig Down" and "Thought Contagion". Drake said that their aim with "Something Human" was to "continue the journey that began in 'Dig Down' and 'Thought Contagion.'" It follows the band members on the "chase of a lifetime," and "something as simple as returning some video tapes becomes an epic journey." Bellamy also added: "Life on the road can bring out your inner beast," and that this video is about "taming that beast, desiring a return to something human, Plus, Teen Wolf is cool."

== Charts ==
Chart (2018)	Peak position
Belgium (Ultratip Bubbling Under Flanders)	4
Belgium (Ultratop 50 Wallonia)	48
France (SNEP)	17
Iceland (Tónlistinn)	16
Netherlands Single Tip (MegaCharts)	26
Poland (ZPAV)	43
Switzerland (Schweizer Hitparade)	77
UK Singles Downloads (Official Charts)	61
UK Singles Sales (OCC)	61
US Hot Rock & Alternative Songs (Billboard)	19
US Adult Alternative Airplay (Billboard)	9
US Alternative Airplay (Billboard)	10
