= MXR Phase 90 =

Phaser pedal

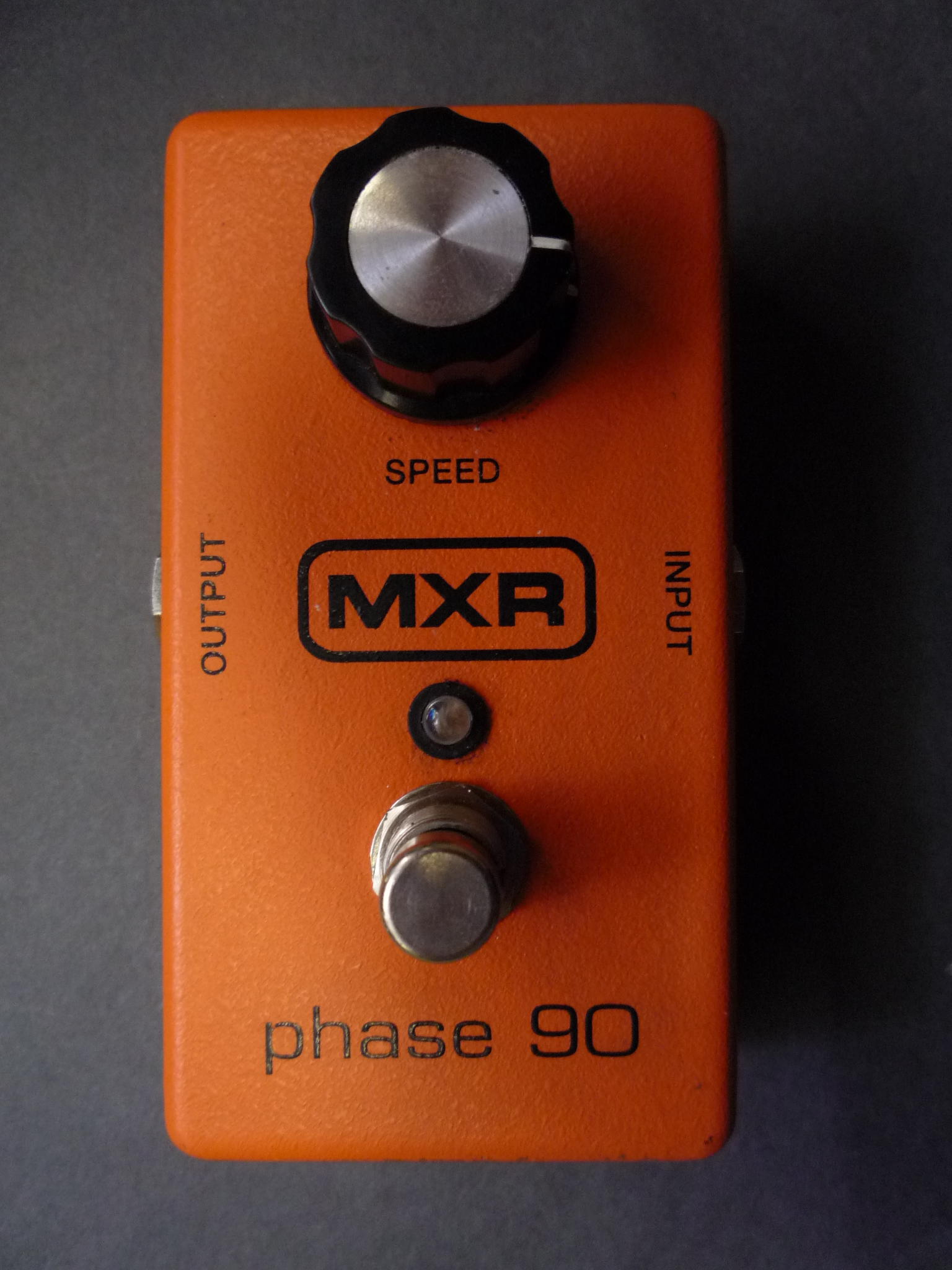
MXR M-101 Phase 90

The MXR Phase 90 is a phaser effect introduced in 1972 by MXR. It users include Eddie Van Halen, David Gilmour, Jimmy Page and Matt Bellamy.

== History ==
The Phase 90 was the first pedal sold by MXR and helped launch MXR in 1974. The original model had a simple orange enclosure with a script style MXR logo. In 1977, MXR changed its logo to a block style. There was a transitional period in which some Phase 90s with script logos had box logo circuits, and vice versa. Production ceased when MXR went bankrupt in 1984. Production resumed when Jim Dunlop bought the MXR brand in 1987.

== Sound ==
The Phase 90 is a four-stage phaser, meaning its signal is reversed at four stages, creating two modulated frequency "notches". The knob controls the speed at which the notches are moved up and down the frequency spectrum. Guitar World wrote of its "mellow quality" that "seems an integral part of the guitar sound rather than something slapped on top of it".

== Users ==
Eddie Van Halen uses the Phase 90 on songs such as "Eruption", "Atomic Punk", "Ain't Talkin' 'bout Love", "Everybody Wants Some!!", and "Drop Dead Legs". He said he liked its subtle sound compared to other phaser effects, and would often engage it for solos in performances to stand out in the mix.

Matt Bellamy of Muse has a Phase 90 built into his custom Manson guitars. Other users include David Gilmour of Pink Floyd, who used it on "Shine On You Crazy Diamond" (1975), Mick Jones of the Clash, who used it on "Lost in the Supermarket" (1979), and Jimmy Page of Led Zeppelin.
