= DigiTech Whammy =

Pitch-shifting effect pedal

Whammy
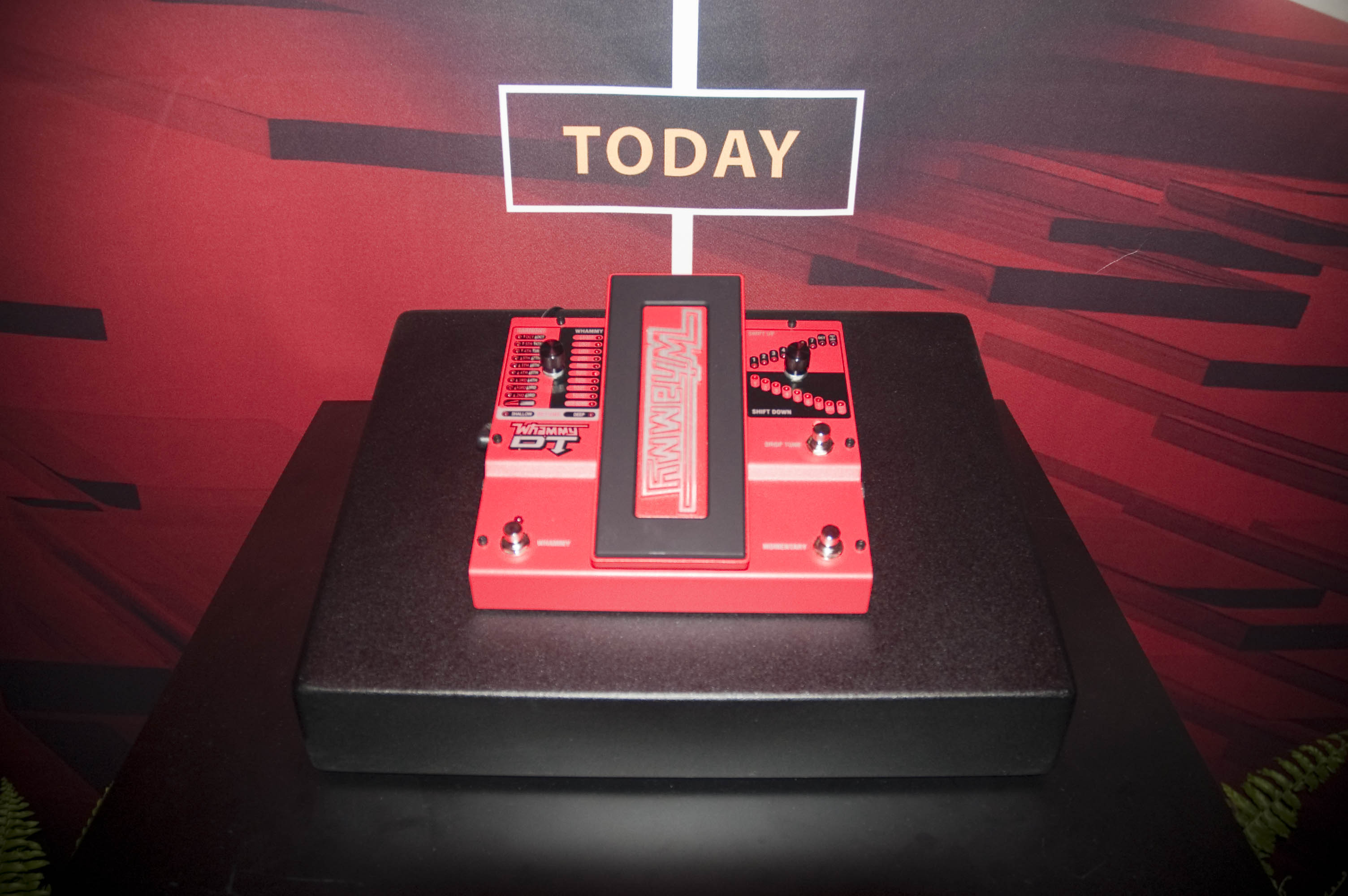
- Digitech Whammy DT
- Manufacturer: DigiTech
- Dates: 1989–present

Technical specifications
- Effects type: Pitch shifter
- Hardware: Digital

Controls
- Pedal control: Expression pedal for pitch bend

Input/output
- External control: MIDI I/O (on Whammy IV) for pitch bend via CC

The DigiTech Whammy is a pitch shifter pedal manufactured by DigiTech. It raises or lowers the pitch of an audio signal by up to two octaves, controlled with a treadle. The first model, released in 1989, was the first mass-market digital pitch shifter.

The Whammy has a distinctive artificial sound, and Guitar World described it as one of the most iconic guitar pedals. Its users include Jonny Greenwood and Ed O'Brien of Radiohead, Matt Bellamy of Muse, Tom Morello of Rage Against the Machine and Audioslave, David Gilmour of Pink Floyd and Jack White of the White Stripes.

== Features ==
The Whammy uses a pitch detection algorithm licensed from IVL Technologies to raise or lower the pitch of an audio signal by up to two octaves. The degree of shift is controlled by a treadle. Users can set pitch-shifting intervals, add harmony, or detune the signal for a chorus-like effect.

The first model was introduced in 1989. Later models added more accurate polyphony, drop-tuning modes, a MIDI input for external control, and a "dive bomb" setting that emulates the sound of a whammy bar. DigiTech also released the Bass Whammy, a model for bass guitars.

Early models were monophonic, meaning they could only accurately track one note at a time. According to Sound on Sound, playing chords created a "strange and artificial" sound, with distinctive "wobbly" artifacts. MusicRadar described it as a "distinctive warble". Later models introduced more accurate pitch tracking for chords, with the option to switch to the "classic" sound.

MusicRadar said the Whammy made a major impact as the first mass-market digital pitch shifter. Guitar World described it as one of the most iconic guitar pedals.

== Users ==
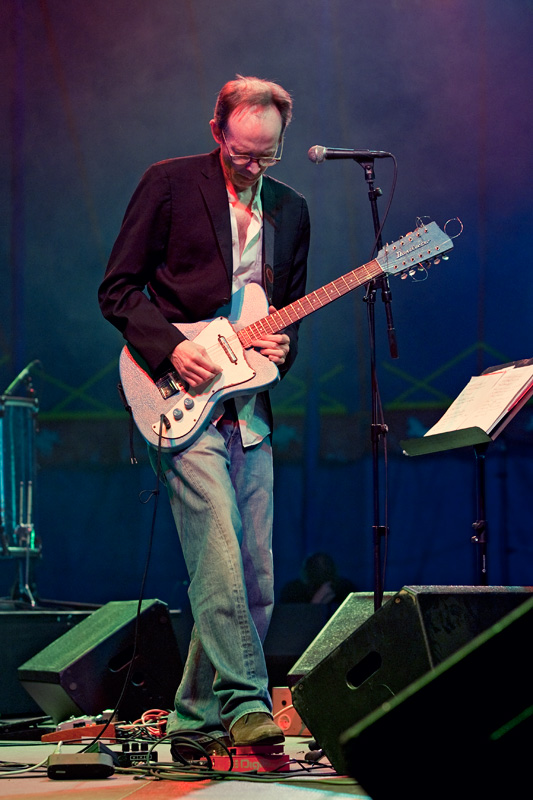
Arto Lindsay using the Whammy

The Radiohead guitarists Jonny Greenwood and Ed O'Brien both use the Whammy. For the introduction of the 1994 song "My Iron Lung", Greenwood uses it to pitch-shift his guitar by an octave, exploiting the inaccurate pitch tracking for chords to create a "glitchy, lo-fi" sound. For "Just", he shifts his solo into a high, piercing frequency. On the 2001 song "Dollars and Cents", O'Brien uses the Whammy to shift his guitar chords from minor to major.

Tom Morello of Rage Against the Machine and Audioslave uses the Whammy to create otherwise impossible effects. For "Voice of the Voiceless", he uses the pitch knob to cycle between intervals.

Matt Bellamy of Muse uses the Whammy on several songs. For the 2007 song "Map of the Problematique", he programmed the Whammy to shift his power chords rhythmically, creating octave patterns. On the 2022 song "Kill or Be Killed", he plays a tapping solo through a Whammy programmed to shift rapidly between octaves, creating broad arpeggios. In 2020, Bellamy worked with Manson Guitar Works to develop a guitar with a built-in Whammy effect.

The Pink Floyd guitarist David Gilmour used the Whammy to achieve "wild, octave-wide bends" on "Marooned" on the 1994 album The Division Bell. Jack White of the White Stripes recorded the riff for "Seven Nation Army" (2003) with the Whammy set one octave down. The Whammy is used by math rock acts such as Three Trapped Tigers and Adebisi Shank to create "video game"-like tones. Other users include Steve Vai, the Smashing Pumpkins, Swervedriver, and Justin Chancellor of Tool.
