= Kyle Lambert =

British illustrator

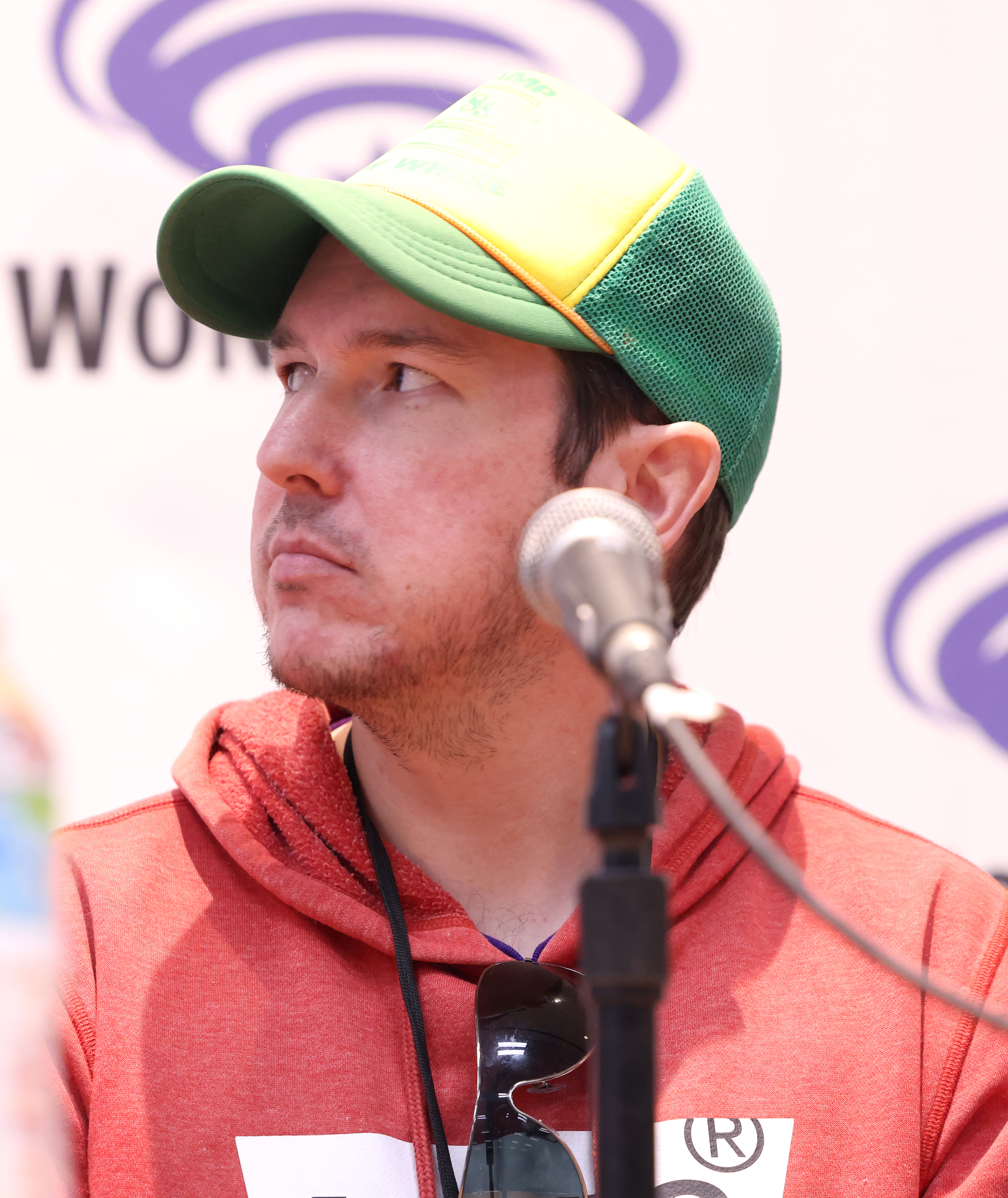
Lambert at the 2025 WonderCon

Kyle Lambert is a British artist known for his illustrated posters, including TV shows like Netflix's Stranger Things and One Piece.

== Biography ==
Lambert studied Fine Art Painting and Illustration with Animation at Manchester Metropolitan University. He initially garnered attention online with his portraits of celebrities done on his Apple iPad.

== Career ==
Lambert has created artwork for the Stranger Things franchise, Jungle Cruise (film), Marvel's Agents of S.H.I.E.L.D., The Boys, Timeless, The Blacklist, Adobe Inc., the Wicker Man (SW8) roller coaster at Alton Towers Resort, the San Diego Zoo's Africa Rocks campaign, and the cover of Muse's 2018 album Simulation Theory.
