= Butterflies and Hurricanes =

- CD cover art by Storm Thorgerson

Single by Muse

from the album Absolution
- Released: 20 September 2004
- Recorded: 2003
- Studio: AIR (London)
- Genre: Art rock; progressive rock; alternative rock
- Length: 5:01 (album version); 4:48 (single version); 4:20 (radio edit)
- Label: Atlantic; Taste; East West
- Composers: Matt Bellamy; Dominic Howard; Chris Wolstenholme
- Lyricist: Matt Bellamy
- Producers: John Cornfield; Muse; Paul Reeve

Muse singles chronology
"Apocalypse Please" (2004)	"Butterflies and Hurricanes" (2004)	"Supermassive Black Hole" (2006)

Music video
- "Butterflies and Hurricanes" by Muse on YouTube

"Butterflies and Hurricanes" is a song by English rock band Muse. It was released as the sixth and final single from their third studio album, Absolution (2003), on 20 September 2004. Unlike Absolution, the single was released through Atlantic Records.

The song was one of two songs recorded with a studio orchestra during the initial stages of production. The song was also dedicated to Dominic Howard's father, who died shortly after the band's performance at the Glastonbury Festival.

== Recording ==
Muse recorded "Butterflies and Hurricanes" in late 2002 with the producers John Cornfield and Paul Reed at Air Studios, London. The songwriter, Matt Bellamy, sought to create a heavy rock song using classical piano instead of guitar, with a continuous "mechanical" paradiddle.

== Track listing ==
=== CD ===
1. "Butterflies and Hurricanes" (Remix With Additional Guitars Full Length) – 5:02
2. "Sing for Absolution" (Live Acoustic Radio 2) – 4:28

=== Clear Vinyl 7" ===
1. "Butterflies and Hurricanes" (full length) – 5:01
2. "Butterflies and Hurricanes" (Glastonbury 2004)

=== DVD ===
1. "Butterflies and Hurricanes" – 4:48
2. "Butterflies and Hurricanes video" – 4:48
3. "The Groove in the States video" – 9:51
4. "Raw video footage"

=== Promo CD ===
1. "Butterflies and Hurricanes" (radio edit) – 4:10
2. "Butterflies and Hurricanes"

== Charts ==
Chart (2004)	Peak position
France (SNEP)	70
Netherlands (Single Top 100)	29
Scottish Singles Sales (Official Charts)	19
UK Singles (Official Charts)	14
UK Rock & Metal (Official Charts)	2
