= Cryosleep (album) =

Studio album by Matt Bellamy
- Released: 17 July 2021
- Recorded: 2019–2021
- Length: 35:52
- Label: Globalist Industries
- Producers: Matt Bellamy; Aleks Von Korff

Cryosleep is the debut solo album by the Muse songwriter Matt Bellamy, released for Record Store Day by Globalist Industries on 17 June 2021 as a 12" LP. It came with an exclusive songbook and gatefold LP.

== Content ==
Cryosleep consists of a cover of the 1970 Simon & Garfunkel song "Bridge over Troubled Water"; a cover of the 1956 song "Fever" performed by Bellamy's band the Jaded Hearts Club; rearranged verions of the Muse songs, "Guiding Light", "Unintended" and "Take a Bow"; Bellamy's composition "Pray", from the album For the Throne: Music Inspired by the HBO Series Game of Thrones; and the previously released tracks "Behold, the Glove" and "Tomorrow's World".

Bellamy recorded "Guiding Light" with the same guitar Jeff Buckley used on his only studio album, Grace, which Bellamy said he would use on future Muse albums. Bellamy said: "I had a whole team of people doing due diligence on it to make sure it was absolutely the right guitar, interviewing his family and all sorts."

"Tomorrow's World", "Unintended" and "Guiding Light" were auctioned as NFTs. The auction was held on the website Cryptograph and made 73,000 dollars.

== Track listing ==
All tracks are written by Matt Bellamy unless stated.

Side A
No.	Title	Writer(s)	Length
1.	"Unintended" (acoustic version)		4:02
2.	"Bridge Over Troubled Water"	Paul Simon	3:15
3.	"Behold, the Glove"		2:28
4.	"Take a Bow (Four Hands Piano)"		4:48
5.	"Pray"		3:43
Total length:			18:17

Side B
No.	Title	Writer(s)	Length
6.	"Tomorrow's World"		2:59
7.	"Guiding Light (on Jeff's Guitar)"		3:52
8.	"Simulation Theory Theme"		3:09
9.	"Fever" (originally by the Jaded Hearts Club)	Eddie Cooley; John Davenport	3:33
10.	"Unintended" (piano lullaby)		3:59
Total length:			17:34; 35:52
