= Absolution (album) =

Studio album by Muse
- Released: 15 September 2003
- Recorded: September 2002 – June 2003
- Studios: Grouse Lodge (Rosemount); AIR (London); Livingston (London); Cello (Los Angeles); Sawmills (Cornwall)
- Genres: Alternative rock; progressive rock; art rock; hard rock
- Length: 52:19
- Label: Taste (Note: Also released through East West Records in the United Kingdom, PIAS Recordings in Benelux, Motor Music in Germany, Naïve Records in France, Festival Mushroom Records in Oceania, Cutting Edge/maximum10 in Japan, and Warner Bros. Records in the United States.)
- Producers: John Cornfield; Rich Costey; Muse; Paul Reeve

Muse chronology
Hullabaloo Soundtrack (2002)	Absolution (2003)	Black Holes and Revelations (2006)

Singles from Absolution
- 1. "Stockholm Syndrome" Released: 14 July 2003; 2. "Time Is Running Out" Released: 8 September 2003; 3. "Hysteria" Released: 1 December 2003; 4. "Sing for Absolution" Released: 17 May 2004; 5. "Apocalypse Please" Released: 23 August 2004; 6. "Butterflies and Hurricanes" Released: 20 September 2004

Absolution is the third studio album by the English rock band Muse, released on 15 September 2003 in Japan before releasing in the UK on 22 September through Taste Media. It was produced by Muse and Rich Costey, with additional production by John Cornfield and Paul Reeve.

Absolution incorporates classical influences, with orchestra on tracks such as "Butterflies and Hurricanes" and "Blackout", and apocalyptic lyrical themes. Muse used effects, synthesisers and software to process many tracks. Most of the album was recorded at Grouse Lodge in County Westmeath, Ireland, with additional sessions at AIR Studios and Livingston Recording Studios in London, Cello Studios in Los Angeles, and Sawmills Studios in Cornwall. Costey aimed to give Muse a bigger, more aggressive sound.

Absolution debuted at number one on the UK Albums Chart. "Stockholm Syndrome", "Time Is Running Out", "Hysteria" and "Sing for Absolution" were released as commercial singles; "Time Is Running Out" became Muse's first top-ten single on the UK singles chart, reaching number eight. A 20th-anniversary version was released in 2023, with remastered audio, unreleased demos and live tracks.

== Background ==
Muse set aside time to develop their third album, as their previous recording sessions had been rushed. In early 2002, they rented a country house outside Brighton for six months to write material. During this period, they were dropped by their American record label, Maverick. The System of a Down singer, Serj Tankian, attempted to sign Muse to his label, Serjical Strike, but Maverick asked for half a million dollars to release them from their contract and his attempts to have Sony provide the money failed.

Muse decided to focus on Europe, and embarked on the final leg of their tour for their previous album, Origin of Symmetry (2001), playing the future Absolution songs "Hysteria" and "The Small Print". After the tour, Muse resumed writing and recording demos in an unused commercial loft in Hackney, London. The singer and songwriter, Matt Bellamy, wrote most of the songs on piano, including guitar-based songs such as "Stockholm Syndrome".

== Recording ==
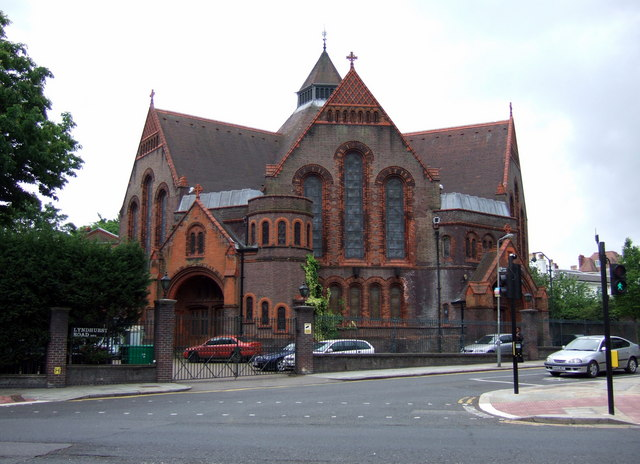
Air Studios, London, where Muse recorded "Butterflies and Hurricanes" and "Blackout"

Muse began recording in late 2002 with the producers John Cornfield and Paul Reed at Air Studios, London, where they recorded "Butterflies and Hurricanes" and "Blackout". They were joined later by the American producer Rich Costey, who produced the rest of the album. Costey had worked with acts Muse admired, including Rage Against the Machine and Audioslave, and wanted to give them a bigger, more aggressive sound. According to Costey, Muse wanted to sound like a "colossal, dynamic, epic and powerful rock band".

Muse and Costey returned to Air in late 2002 to work on songs including "Hysteria" and "Stockholm Syndrome". Bellamy restructured "Hysteria" after feedback from Costey. For "Stockholm Syndrome", Costey vocodered Bellamy's guitar with a Nord modular synthesiser. Muse and Costey regrouped in early 2003 for 10 days at Livingston Recording Studios, London, completing the recordings they had made at Air.

Muse moved to Grouse Lodge, a residential recording studio in County Westmeath, Ireland, where most of the album was recorded. The sessions were marred by Muse's strained relationship with their record company and a lawsuit with their production company. When Muse's co-manager arrived to review their progress, they found him disruptive and threw him out of the studio. Bellamy said later that "there was a genuine sense of impending doom for the band". The bassist, Chris Wolstenholme, struggled with alcoholism during the sessions.

To create basic tracks, Muse recorded together live, then focused on overdubs. Costey minimised editing to preserve the "human touch" and avoid an artificial result. He added little reverb, preferring the natural ambience recorded by the microphones.

Bellamy used custom Manson guitars and Marshall and Diezel amps. Wolstenholme split his signal into three Marshall amps, one clean and two distorted, and blended the results. For "Fury", Bellamy used a DigiTech Whammy pedal to rhythmically pitch-shift the guitar riff. Muse and Costey used the sound design system Kyma to process multiple tracks. Bellamy said Kyma added an "outrageously hi-fi and bright and futuristic sound"; Costey described it as "the sound of the record".

The group experimented with drum sounds, using a number of microphones. For the introduction to "Apocalypse Please", they recorded two kick drums in the Grouse Lodge swimming pool. They also recorded Wolstenholme diving into the pool, which was used in the bridge of "Thoughts of a Dying Atheist". For "Ruled by Secrecy", they recorded a drum take in the courtyard outdoors, hoping to capture an unusual ambience, but discarded the results. On "Falling Away with You", Costey captured the sound of Bellamy's fingers on the guitar strings to create an intimate feeling.

For "Sing for Absolution", Muse used prepared piano, laying metal objects such as nails and guitar strings on the piano strings. They also processed the piano with a pitch-shifting DigiTech Whammy pedal and an Echloplex delay effect. For "Ruled by Secrecy", they blended piano and a Yamaha CP-80 electric piano. Costey recorded Bellamy's left and right-hand parts separately, and ran them through guitar amps and an Echoplex. "Time Is Running Out" was the most difficult song to record; Muse spent hours working on the bass sound for the introduction, processing Wolstenholme's bass with multiple effects. Eventually, they used a Roland synthesiser played through a Marshall amp.

"Endlessly" was the last song completed. Muse struggled to improve on the simplicity of Bellamy's demo, recorded with a piano and a four-to-the-floor drum machine rhythm. Eventually, they used lighter, jazzier drumming and an old Hammond organ. Later in 2003, Muse and Costey spent three weeks in Cello Studios, Los Angeles. They recorded the final version of "Endlessly", recorded additional overdubs, including the opening marching sounds, and mixed the album. They also attracted interest from American labels and signed a contract with Warner Bros. Records.

== Music and lyrics ==
Absolution contains elements of alternative rock, progressive rock, hard rock, and art rock. Its sound is more polished and direct than Muse's previous albums. In 2020, Wolstenholme described it as a continuation of Origin of Symmetry: "We knew what we wanted to do, and we'd found our feet a little bit, and we felt comfortable with what we did."

Initially, Bellamy planned Absolution as a concept album about insanity; "Butterflies & Hurricanes" was a remnant of this idea. The direction changed following the beginning of the Iraq War. Bellamy said that the lyrics for "Apocalypse Please" followed naturally from the "epic and in-your-face" chord progression. For "Butterflies and Hurricanes", Bellamy sought to create a heavy rock song using classical piano instead of guitar, with a continuous "mechanical" paradiddle. "Blackout" features mandolin and orchestra.

The lyrics incorporate themes of fear, mistrust, achievement and joy, and a general theme of "things coming to an end". Bellamy was inspired by 9/11 conspiracy theories, which he described as "good subject matter" for songwriting. He later disavowed conspiracy theories as dangerous. The end of Muse's relationship with their American label, Maverick, also influenced the lyrics. Bellamy said that absolution was "not necessarily a religious word; it has meanings of purity, but it's not necessarily talking from a Christian or any particular religious point of view. I think it's just suggesting that the act of making music is a way of understanding things."

== Artwork ==
The Absolution cover was created by Storm Thorgerson, and depicts the shadows of figures either leaving or descending to Earth. Rather than use software such as Photoshop, Thorgerson's team cut shapes from hardboard, fixed them to poles and photographed them in a chalk pit to create strong shadows. The Reader's Digest writer Kris Griffiths likened the image to the 1953 René Magritte painting Golconda.

== Release and promotion ==
Absolution was presented to the press with a star show at the London Planetarium, followed by a party at Madame Tussauds. It was released on 22 September 2003 on CD and double vinyl.

The first single, "Stockholm Syndrome", was released as a download and was downloaded more than 20,000 times. Because of contractual obligations, Muse could not allow it to be downloaded free, so the fee was set at $0.99 in the US. "Time Is Running Out" became Muse's first top-10 single on the UK singles chart and was certified gold in the US. "Hysteria" was released on December 1, and reached number 17 on the UK singles chart and number 9 on the US Modern Rock Tracks chart. Boosted by the "Hysteria" single, Absolution re-entered the UK Album Chart.

Muse released "Apocalypse Please" as a download on August 23 exclusively on Oxfam's Big Noise website. Sixty per cent of the proceeds went to Oxfam; Muse and their record label waived their profit. "Butterflies and Hurricanes" was released as a CD single on September 20, featuring software that allowed listeners to create their own remix.

Absolution entered the UK Albums Chart at number one. By January 2004 it had sold a quarter of a million copies. It was Muse's first album to chart in the US, and is credited with establishing their fan base there. It was the second Muse album released in the US, after a dispute with Maverick Records had canceled the release of Origin of Symmetry there. Absolution reached No. 1 on the Billboard Top Heatseekers chart and No. 107 on the Billboard 200. It was certified gold in the US in March 2007.

On tour for Absolution, Muse performed in arenas for the first time and headlined Glastonbury Festival in 2004. The tour ended with two sold-out nights at Earls Court, London. Muse also toured the United States, playing in small clubs.

== Critical reception ==
Professional ratings
Aggregate scores
Source	Rating
Metacritic	72/100
Review scores
Source	Rating
AllMusic	4/5 stars
Alternative Press	5/5
Blender	3/5 stars
Drowned in Sound	10/10
The Guardian	4/5 stars
NME	9/10
Q	4/5 stars
Rolling Stone	3/5 stars
The Scotsman	4/5 stars
Uncut	3/5 stars

On Metacritic, Absolution has a score of 72 of 100 based on 16 reviews, indicating "generally favourable reviews". Alternative Press wrote that its "chaotic choruses feel like the triumphant culmination of some earth-shattering undertaking", while Andrew Future of Drowned in Sound called it "a truly elemental opus". Tyler Fisher of Sputnikmusic felt that Absolution was Muse's most consistent album yet and that it perfected their sound, writing that it "expands on newer sounds and improves on others". Alexis Petridis of The Guardian wrote: "Muse sound like a band who are at the top of their game. Their confidence carries you through the album's excesses." Rob Kemp of Rolling Stone was less enthusiastic, drawing Radiohead comparisons and concluding that Bellamy "doesn't bring as much ingenuity to his singing".

=== Legacy ===
In 2005, Absolution was ranked number 345 in the Rock Hard book The 500 Greatest Rock & Metal Albums of All Time. In 2009, Q readers voted it the 23rd-best British album, and in 2009 Kerrang! readers voted it the second-best album of the century so far. In 2024, the Dream Theater drummer, Mike Portnoy, said Absolution was his favourite album of the century. It influenced Dream Theater tracks such as "Never Enough", from Octavarium (2005), and "Prophets of War", from Systematic Chaos (2007).

A remastered 20th-anniversary reissue, Absolution XX Anniversary, featuring bonus tracks, live recordings and demos, was released on 17 November 2023. Clash wrote that the reissue was not as "neatly constructed or unique" as the 2021 Origin of Symmetry reissue, with "largely dispensable" bonus material, but praised the "punchier, cleaner" remaster.

== Track listing ==
All lyrics are written by Matt Bellamy; all music is composed by Bellamy, Dominic Howard and Chris Wolstenholme.

Absolution – Standard edition
No.	Title	Length
1.	"Intro"	0:22
2.	"Apocalypse Please"	4:12
3.	"Time Is Running Out"	3:56
4.	"Sing for Absolution"	4:54
5.	"Stockholm Syndrome"	4:58
6.	"Falling Away with You"	4:40
7.	"Interlude"	0:37
8.	"Hysteria"	3:47
9.	"Blackout"	4:22
10.	"Butterflies and Hurricanes"	5:01
11.	"The Small Print"	3:28
12.	"Endlessly"	3:49
13.	"Thoughts of a Dying Atheist"	3:11
14.	"Ruled by Secrecy"	4:54
Total length:		52:19

== Personnel ==
Personnel adapted from Absolution liner notes, except where noted.

Muse

- Matt Bellamy – lead vocals, guitars, keyboards, mandolin on "Blackout", programming, string arrangements, production
- Chris Wolstenholme – bass, backing vocals, production
- Dominic Howard – drums, percussion, programming, production

Production

- Rich Costey – production, mixing, engineering, additional production on "Blackout" and "Butterflies and Hurricanes"
- Paul Reeve – production and backing vocals on "Blackout" and "Butterflies and Hurricanes", vocal samples on "Intro"
- John Cornfield – production and engineering on "Blackout" and "Butterflies and Hurricanes"
- Wally Gagel – engineering, digital engineering, additional production on "Butterflies and Hurricanes"
- Howie Weinberg – mastering
- Roger Lian – digital editing
- Ciaran Bradshaw – assistant engineer (Grouse Lodge)
- Adam Noble – assistant engineer (AIR)
- Darren Mora – assistant engineer (Cello)
- Jason Gossman – assistant engineer (Cello)
- Donald Clark – assistant engineer (Livingston)
- Tom Joyce – assistant engineer (Sawmills)
- Dennis Smith, Safta Jaffery – executive production

Additional personnel

- Audrey Riley – string arrangements
- Spectrasonics Symphony of Voices – vocal samples on "Stockholm Syndrome" and "Endlessly"
- Storm Thorgerson, Dan Abbott – graphic design
- Rupert Truman, Sean Winstanley – photography
- Perou – band photography
- Lee Baker – layout design
- Sam Winston – typography

== Charts ==
=== Weekly charts ===
Chart (2003–2004)	Peak position
Australian Albums (ARIA)	21
Austrian Albums (Ö3 Austria)	5
Belgian Albums (Ultratop Flanders)	7
Belgian Albums (Ultratop Wallonia)	2
Canadian Albums (Nielsen SoundScan)	74
Danish Albums (Hitlisten)	28
Dutch Albums (Album Top 100)	2
Finnish Albums (Suomen virallinen lista)	12
French Albums (SNEP)	1
German Albums (Offizielle Top 100)	11
Irish Albums (IRMA)	3
Italian Albums (FIMI)	4
Japanese Albums (Oricon)	22
New Zealand Albums (RMNZ)	17
Norwegian Albums (VG-lista)	5
Portuguese Albums (AFP)	7
Scottish Albums (Official Charts)	2
Spanish Albums (AFYVE)	14
Swiss Albums (Schweizer Hitparade)	3
UK Albums (Official Charts)	1
US Billboard 200	107

Chart (2026)	Peak position
Croatian International Albums (HDU)	40

=== Year-end charts ===
Chart (2003)	Position
Belgian Albums (Ultratop Flanders)	83
Belgian Albums (Ultratop Wallonia)	25
Dutch Albums (Album Top 100)	73
French Albums (SNEP)	62
Italian Albums (FIMI)	55
Swiss Albums (Schweizer Hitparade)	38
UK Albums (OCC)	70

Chart (2004)	Position
French Albums (SNEP)	124
UK Albums (OCC)	82

Chart (2005)	Position
UK Albums (OCC)	171

Chart (2006)	Position
UK Albums (OCC)	197

== Certifications ==
Region	Certification	Certified units/sales
Australia (ARIA)	Platinum	70,000^{^}
Belgium (BRMA)	Gold	25,000^{*}
Canada (Music Canada)	Gold	50,000^{^}
Germany (BVMI)	Gold	100,000^{‡}
Italy (FIMI) sales in between 2003-2004	Gold	50,000^{*}
Italy (FIMI) sales since 2009	Gold	25,000^{*}
Netherlands (NVPI)	Gold	40,000^{^}
New Zealand (RMNZ)	Gold	7,500^{^}
Russia (NFPF)	Gold	10,000^{*}
Switzerland (IFPI Switzerland)	Gold	20,000^{^}
United Kingdom (BPI)	3× Platinum	948,685
United States (RIAA)	Platinum	1,000,000^{^}
Summaries
Europe (IFPI)	Platinum	1,000,000^{*}
^{*} Sales figures based on certification alone.^{^} Shipments figures based on certification alone.^{‡} Sales+streaming figures based on certification alone.

== Notes and references ==
Notes
