= Manson Guitar Works =

British guitar and bass manufacturer

Manson Guitar Works is a British guitar manufacturer based in Devon, England. Initially focused on one-off, customised instruments, Manson Guitar Works has since extended its range of products into bass guitars, accessories, and, after forming a relationship with Cort, has recently launched more affordable ranges. Muse’s Matt Bellamy has used Manson guitars since 2001, and in 2019 he bought a majority share of the company.

== History ==
The company was started by Hugh Manson after following in his brother's footsteps in the guitar building scene, specialising in electric guitars. After moving from Crowborough to Exeter, Manson set up Mansons Guitar Shop alongside Adrian Ashton and Jay Henson. The company separated from the guitar shop in to avoid confusion. In 2019, the long-time Manson player Matt Bellamy of Muse bought a majority share in the company. In 2023, Bellamy revealed that the company is working on a line of pedals as well as more affordable instruments and more integrated effects, hinting at potential collaborations with DigiTech.

== Matt Bellamy ==
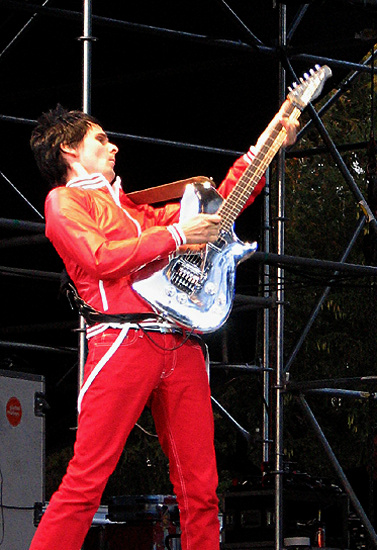
Bellamy playing a Manson guitar in 2006

Since the early 2000s, Matt Bellamy of Muse has worked with Manson Guitar Works to create his electric guitars. They have released several "M-series" signature models.

The early years Muse were based in their hometown of Teignmouth, and the band sourced much of their equipment from Mansons Guitar Shop in Exeter. After the release of Showbiz in 1999, Bellamy had the funds to purchase his first Manson guitar — a 7-string that is most notably played in the song "Citizen Erased" —and ordered a customised guitar known as the De Lorean, after the time machine in Back to the Future. The guitar's shape was inspired by a Fender Telecaster and Bellamy's previous Yamaha Pacifica, featuring custom electronics which allowed for the integration of a ZVEX Fuzz Factory and MXR Phase 90 and a custom aluminium finish. In 2001, Manson built a guitar with integrated MIDI.

After the formation of the Beatles tribute the Jaded Hearts Club, Bellamy purchased a Höfner bass. By the time the group extended their repertoire and released the singles from the debut cover album, Bellamy had acquired a custom Manson violin bass with integrated LEDs. Bellamy's signature models have also been manufactured by Cort, first as the MBC model and now as the MBM. The Verona Sky guitar debuted on the Will of the People tour and is used for performances of the song "Verona".
