= Thought Contagion =

Single by Muse

from the album Simulation Theory
- Released: 15 February 2018
- Recorded: 2017
- Genre: Electronic rock; alternative rock
- Length: 3:26
- Label: Warner Bros.
- Songwriter: Matt Bellamy
- Producers: Rich Costey; Sam Grubbs; Muse; Dylan Neustadter; Colin Willard

Muse singles chronology
"Dig Down" (2017)	"Thought Contagion" (2018)	"Something Human" (2018)

"Thought Contagion" is a song by the English rock band Muse. It was released as the second single from their eighth studio album, Simulation Theory, on 15 February 2018. It debuted at number 76 on the UK Singles Chart and topped the UK Rock & Metal Singles Chart.

== Writing and recording ==
"Thought Contagion" was released as a single and music video on 15 February 2018. Speaking to Rolling Stone, frontman Matt Bellamy revealed that the song was written in late 2017, explaining that "I came up with the bass line and then I used a theremin, originally, to [create] this lead melody that went over the top." This melody was later changed, with Bellamy noting that "it occurred to me that the theremin melody would be a cool, anthemic sort of vocal part, so [bassist] Chris [Wolstenholme] and I did about ten passes on that to create this sort of crowd effect on the vocal".

== Composition and lyrics ==
"Thought Contagion" has been described as electronic rock, while retaining "Muse's usual mix of flashy alt-rock and Queen-sized theatrics." Matt Bellamy called it "a pretty epic and anthemic track", pointing out its "arena sound and synths" as examples of the band's process of "getting into blending genres and eras together" for their upcoming eighth studio album.

In an interview with Beats 1 presenter Matt Wilkinson, Bellamy explained that the lyrics of "Thought Contagion" are based on the theory "that thoughts are contagious [and that] they spread like a virus, or like genes", noting that he had read about the idea in a book by Richard Dawkins. The singer has also admitted that the lyrical content of the song is likely influenced by "watching American news stations", detailing that "The verses are me streaming off anxieties and feelings, which ... I'm wondering whether they're actually mine or not".

== Music video ==
The music video for "Thought Contagion" was directed by Lance Drake, who also directed the band's previous video "Dig Down", and features "vampires who can manipulate lightning, neon-drenched streets, old arcade cabinets and a Thriller-type dance routine". Billboard writer Nina Braca also compared the video to Michael Jackson's Thriller, describing it as "[an] intense '80s-inspired zombie love story", while Spin magazine's Andy Cush called it "an '80s-indebted video about sexy vampires and riot police".

== Charts ==
=== Weekly charts ===
Weekly chart performance for "Thought Contagion"
Chart (2018)	Peak position
Belgium (Ultratip Bubbling Under Flanders)	2
Belgium (Ultratip Bubbling Under Wallonia)	5
Canada Rock (Billboard)	5
France (SNEP)	197
Portugal (AFP)	79
Scottish Singles Sales (Official Charts)	56
Switzerland (Schweizer Hitparade)	24
UK Singles (Official Charts)	76
UK Rock & Metal (Official Charts)	1
US Hot Rock & Alternative Songs (Billboard)	10
US Rock & Alternative Airplay (Billboard)	3

=== Year-end charts ===
Year-end chart performance for "Thought Contagion"
Chart (2018)	Position
US Hot Rock Songs (Billboard)	25
US Rock Airplay (Billboard)	9
