= Pressure (Muse song) =

Single by Muse

from the album Simulation Theory
- Released: 27 September 2018
- Genre: Power pop; hard rock; pop rock
- Length: 3:55
- Label: Warner Bros.
- Songwriter: Matt Bellamy
- Producers: Rich Costey; Muse

Muse singles chronology
"The Dark Side" (2018)	"Pressure" (2018)	"Won't Stand Down" (2022)

"Pressure" is a song by English rock band Muse. It was released as the fifth single from the band's eighth studio album, Simulation Theory. The track was released on 27 September 2018, following the release of "The Dark Side", which was released August of that year.

== Writing and composition ==
"Pressure" is a power pop, hard rock and pop rock song with contrasting horns and guitars, reminiscent of nerd rock. The song features several interchanging riffs. Prior to the release of the single, Muse frontman Matt Bellamy expressed that the single would be a "straight Muse rock track" and return to the band's "classic" sound, following the release of "Something Human". Radio.com described the single as a "dark song exploring a mind trapped by expectations."

Bellamy had a demo of the song which included him playing the guitar and it was suggested by drummer Dominic Howard to perform some of the riffs with brass instruments. After viewing a video of the UCLA Bruin Marching Band perform a Muse tribute halftime show, the band recorded an alternative version that prominently features the school marching band. This version was included in the deluxe versions of the album.

== Music video ==
Similarly to the music videos of previous singles from the album, the video continues to include 1980's pop culture references. It was directed by Lance Drake and stars the band performing as "Rocket Baby Dolls" (Muse's original band name) at a homecoming dance akin to a scene from Back to the Future, and Terry Crews as a chaperone who uses a Ghostbusters-esque proton pack to subdue an outbreak of gremlin-like creatures made by Eric Fox at Morbx FX Lab. Critics also identified homages to Critters, the work of John Hughes, Footloose, The Breakfast Club, and Stranger Things. The vampric creatures that the corpses transform into at the end of the video resemble the Haemovores from the 1989 Doctor Who serial The Curse of Fenric.

== Charts ==
=== Weekly charts ===
Chart (2018)	Peak position
Belgium (Ultratip Bubbling Under Flanders)	3
Belgium (Ultratip Bubbling Under Wallonia)	19
Canada Rock (Billboard)	11
France (SNEP)	165
Netherlands Single Tip (MegaCharts)	15
Portugal (AFP)	69
UK Singles (OCC)	96
US Hot Rock & Alternative Songs (Billboard)	14
US Rock & Alternative Airplay (Billboard)	7

=== Year-end charts ===
Chart (2019)	Position
US Hot Rock Songs (Billboard)	43
US Rock Airplay Songs (Billboard)	25
