= DOD Electronics =

American effects pedal manufacturer

- Company type: Private
- Industry: Musical Instrument Manufacturing
- Founded: 1974
- Founder: David Oreste DiFrancesco
- Defunct: 2008, revived in 2013
- Headquarters: United States
- Products: guitar effects
- Owner: Cort
- Parent: U.S. Music Corporation
- Website: Official website

DOD Electronics, or simply DOD, also known as their brand name DigiTech, is an American manufacturing company that makes guitar effects pedals, as well as active crossover gear. DOD is owned by Cortek, the parent company of Cort Guitars. Their DigiTech Whammy pedal has been called "one of the most significant innovations in pedal tech".

== History ==
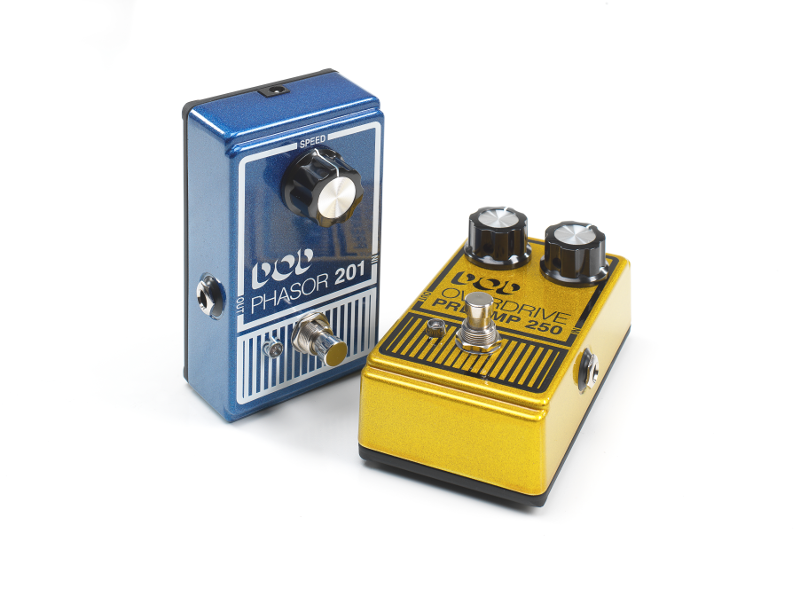
Photograph of the new 2013 DOD Pedals

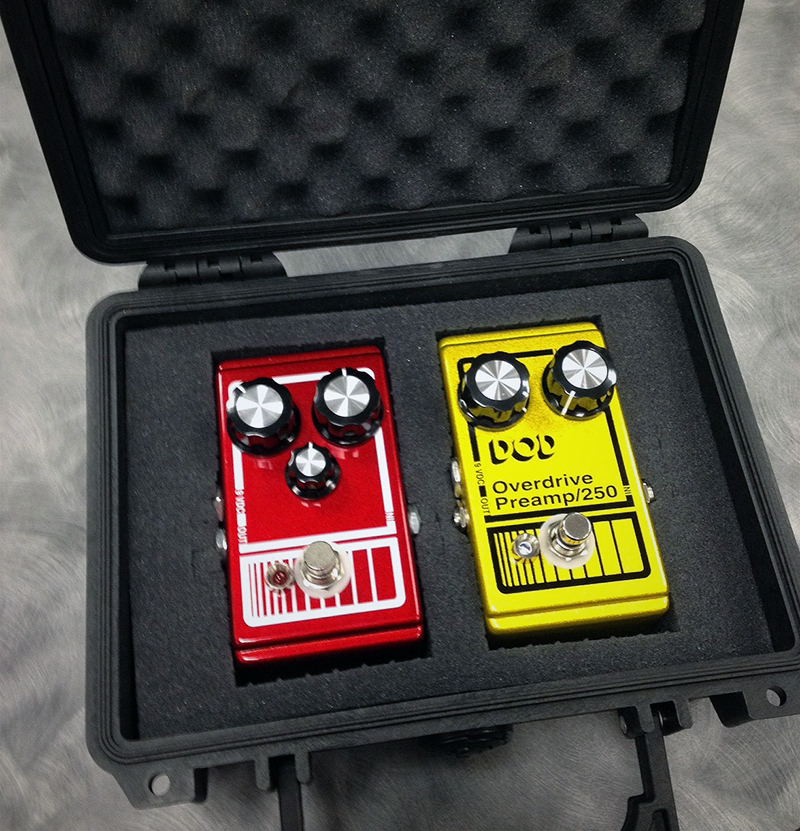
Photo of DOD prototypes shown at the 2011 NAMM Show

DOD stands for the initials of David Oreste DiFrancesco, who founded the company in 1974 with business partner and musician John Johnson. David was the original engineer who, with his business partner John, later sold the company to Harman International in 1990–1991. David now runs a company called Rolls Corporation.

Over DOD's 50-year history, the company introduced many pedal lines and early multi-effect devices, like the "944 Chain-Reaction" and digital delays like the now sought-after PDS series. The 1970s and early 1980s 200, 400 and 600 series of stompboxes have become very collectable. 1970s gray Overdrive Preamp 250s with LM741 op-amps fetch premium prices with collectors, with the yellow early 1980s 250s not far behind. Later 1990s DOD pedals have also become collector's items like the "Gonkulator", "Grind", "Buzz Box", "Meat Box", "Vibro Thang", and "Big Pig Fat" Distortion.

Many popular DOD pedals are available under the DigiTech name. This includes the Envelope Filter.

In early 2010, Harman employee Tom Cram personally began a clandestine skunkworks project to revive DOD. This resulted in the prototypes for what would be the new DOD 250, 201, and an unidentified third red pedal. This skunkworks project was unknown to Harman and only became official after Cram showed his completed prototypes. Mr. Cram has subsequently become the marketing manager for DigiTech/DOD and continued to work on new DigiTech and DOD pedals until Samsung bought Harman International in 2018.

On September 16, 2013, DOD returned with updated versions of the venerable "Overdrive Preamp/250", and "Phasor/201". Both feature true bypass, blue LEDs, modern power jack, lighter aluminum chassis, two tone flat-black and metal-flake paint jobs. The 2013 250 also features an LM741 op-amp to replicate the sounds of the original 250. In 2014 three more updated DOD pedals were released, the "BIFET Boost 410", and the "Envelope Filter 440", and the "Electro-Optical Compressor 280". The 410 features a new buffer on/off toggle and the 440 features an up/down voicing toggle, and the 280 circuit is untouched except for the addition of true bypass, LED, and modern PSU jack. All feature true bypass, blue LEDs, modern power jack, lighter aluminum chassis, two tone flat-black and metal-flake paint jobs.

In early 2015, a new DOD pedal called the "Boneshaker" distortion unit was released; this is a collaboration with boutique pedal builder Mark Wentz of Black Arts Toneworks.

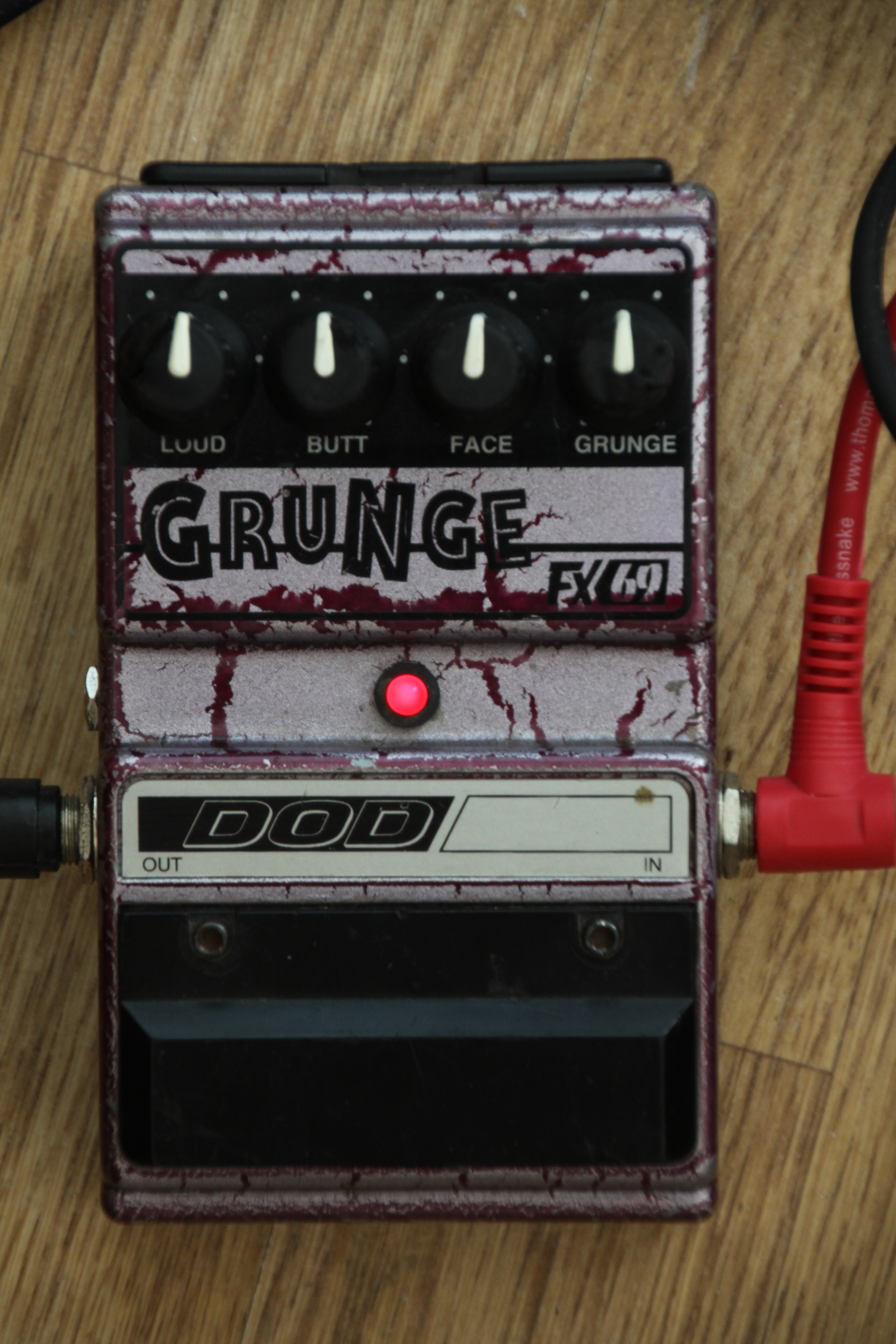
DOD Grunge distortion effect pedal.

In September 2017, Harman announced that it was restructuring and consolidating its R&D facilities. This led to the engineering team at DOD/Digitech being fired in 2018, and the department integrated into Harman Pro.

In April 2022, Cort Guitars' parent company Cortek purchased DOD and DigiTech.
