= Dig Down =

Single by Muse

from the album Simulation Theory
- Released: 18 May 2017
- Recorded: 2017
- Studio: AIR Studios (London, England)
- Genre: Synth-pop; new wave; glam rock; gospel
- Length: 3:48; 3:57 (Acoustic Gospel Version)
- Label: Helium 3; Warner Bros.
- Songwriter: Matt Bellamy
- Producers: Mike Elizondo; Muse

Muse singles chronology
"Reapers" (2016)	"Dig Down" (2017)	"Thought Contagion" (2018)

"Dig Down" is a song by English rock band Muse. Produced by the band with Mike Elizondo, it was released as the lead single from their eighth studio album, Simulation Theory (2018) on 18 May 2017. "Dig Down" debuted at number 94 on the UK Singles Downloads Chart. The next week, it peaked at 51 on that chart.

== Background ==
Muse began teasing the release of a new song in early May 2017, sharing photos and clips from the video. After announcing the track the week before, "Dig Down" was released alongside its music video on 18 May 2017. Speaking about writing the song, Muse frontman Matt Bellamy explained that "I was looking to counteract the current negativity in the world and give inspiration, optimism and hope to people to fight for the causes they believe in – that as individuals we can choose to change the world if we want to".

On the deluxe versions of the album, an alternative version of the song was included, dubbed the "Acoustic Gospel Version". This version does away with the electronic elements and instead is a much quieter, simpler version featuring acoustic guitar, piano and a choir in the background. According to Bellamy, this version is very similar to how the song sounded when he initially wrote it, before he reworked the song into its finished version.

== Composition ==
As the lead single, "Dig Down" introduced the synth-pop and new wave sound of Simulation Theory, a departure from the hard rock-leaning Drones (2015). Michelle Geslani of Consequence described the song as "a stuttering, mostly sparse number with hints of glam rock flare," while Jörn Schlüter of Rolling Stone Germany called it "cyborg gospel."

== Music video ==
The music video for "Dig Down" was released alongside the track on 18 May 2017. Directed by Lance Drake, the video features model and activist Lauren Wasser, "who has to fight her way out of a high-security building" while the band members sing or play their respective instruments while attempting to resemble the Max Headroom incident. Writing for Rolling Stone magazine, Elias Light outlined that in the "violent, kung-fu-filled" video, "Wasser's character, outnumbered at least 20-to-1, defeats a series of shadowy assailants in hand-to-hand combat". Speaking about the production of the video, Drake explained that "When I heard this song, I knew I wanted to do an action-packed narrative. I'd heard about Lauren a year or so ago, I read her story and she gave me personal inspiration so I'd always kept her in mind to shoot with one day. The power of the song made me think of her – so I wrote the video narrative based on Lauren's story and how she overcame the odds."

== Live video ==
An official live video was also released through the Muse YouTube channel on 5 June 2017. The video, directed by Tom Kirk, was recorded in Nashville on 3 June 2017.

== Reception ==
The song has received mixed reviews from both critics and fans of the band. Matt Dawson from RedBrick gave an average review stating "it appears that Muse have yet to perfect the formula of trying new things and retaining the components that made them good in the first place". Jason Davis from The Edge also gave a mixed review expressing - "Muse have a knack for the experimenting in their music, but 'Dig Down' has only that going for it. This relatively uneventful song doesn't stand up to their past anthems." awarding 3/5 stars. However, Hayden Benfield from Renowned for Sound gave a positive review stating - "Dig Down is certainly a catchy track that grows on the listener with repeat listens.", giving it 4/5 stars.

== Charts ==
=== Weekly charts ===
Chart (2017)	Peak position
Belgium (Ultratip Bubbling Under Flanders)	13
Belgium (Ultratip Bubbling Under Wallonia)	13
Canada Rock (Billboard)	13
France (SNEP)	35
Scottish Singles Sales (Official Charts)	56
Spain (Promusicae)	39
Switzerland (Schweizer Hitparade)	47
UK Singles Downloads (OCC)	51
US Hot Rock & Alternative Songs (Billboard)	21
US Rock & Alternative Airplay (Billboard)	6

=== Year-end charts ===
Chart (2017)	Position
US Hot Rock Songs (Billboard)	59
US Rock Airplay (Billboard)	31
