= Matt Bellamy =

English musician (born 1978)

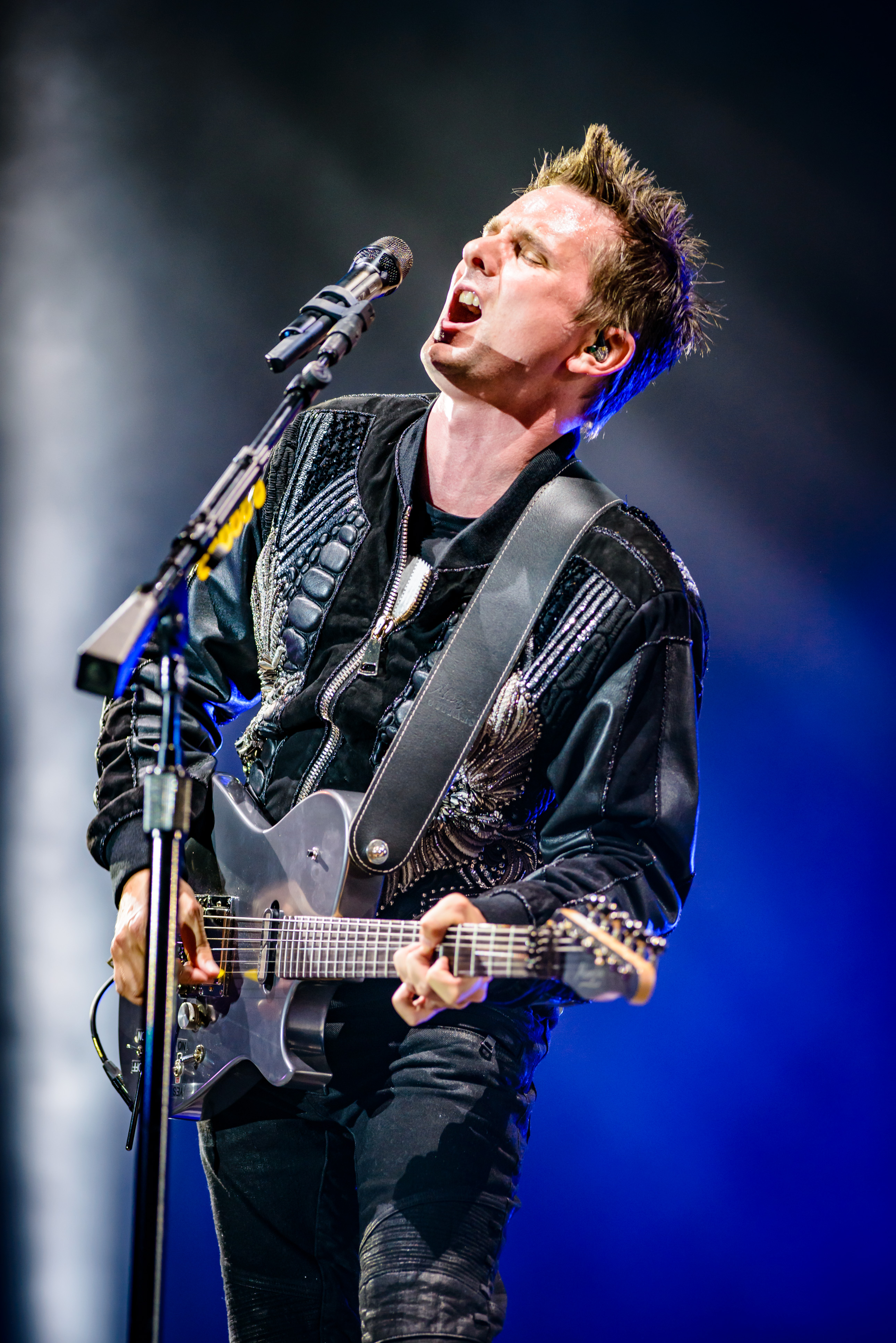
- Bellamy performing with Muse in 2018
- Born: Matthew James Bellamy; 9 June 1978 (age 48); Cambridge, Cambridgeshire, England
- Occupations: Musician; singer; songwriter; record producer
- Years active: 1991–present
- Spouse: Elle Evans (m. 2019; sep. 2025)
- Partner: Kate Hudson (2010–2014)
- Children: 3
- Musical career
- Origin: Teignmouth, Devon, England
- Genres: Alternative rock; art rock; electronic rock; progressive rock; hard rock; space rock; electronica
- Instruments: Vocals; guitar; piano; keyboards; bass
- Label: Helium 3
- Member of: Muse; The Jaded Hearts Club
- Website: mattbellamy.com

Matthew James Bellamy (born 9 June 1978) is an English musician and producer. He is the lead vocalist, guitarist, pianist, and lyricist for the English rock band Muse. He is recognised for his eccentric stage persona, wide tenor vocal range and musicianship.

Bellamy was born in Cambridge. His family moved to Teignmouth, Devon, where he formed Muse with schoolmates. They released their debut album, Showbiz, in 1999. With Muse, Bellamy has won two Grammy Awards for Best Rock Album, for The Resistance (2009) and Drones (2015); two Brit Awards for Best British Live Act; five MTV Europe Music Awards; and eight NME Awards. Muse have sold over 30 million albums worldwide. In 2012, they received the Ivor Novello Award for International Achievement from the British Academy of Songwriters, Composers and Authors.

Bellamy has released solo compositions, and released a compilation of solo tracks, Cryosleep, in 2021. He plays bass in the supergroup the Jaded Hearts Club, and produced their debut album, You've Always Been Here (2020). Since the early 2000s, Bellamy has worked with Manson Guitar Works, based in Devon, to create his electric guitars. In 2019, Bellamy purchased a majority stake in Manson.

== Early life ==
Matthew James Bellamy was born on 9 June 1978 in Cambridge. He has an older brother named Paul. His father, George Bellamy, was the rhythm guitarist of the 1960s pop group the Tornados, whose 1962 single "Telstar" was the first US number one by a British band. He grew up in Teignmouth, Devon.

Bellamy had violin and clarinet lessons as a child, but soon quit. He began playing piano at home around the age of 11, mimicking his father's Ray Charles and Stevie Wonder records. At age 13, he won a talent contest playing boogie-woogie piano. He took piano lessons with a jazz teacher, but quit when the teacher told him his technique was incorrect. Instead, he started playing rock guitar, inspired by Jimi Hendrix. He took flamenco guitar lessons when he was 17, which led to his interest in classical music. Bellamy studied music at A-level at Exeter College, Devon.

== Muse ==
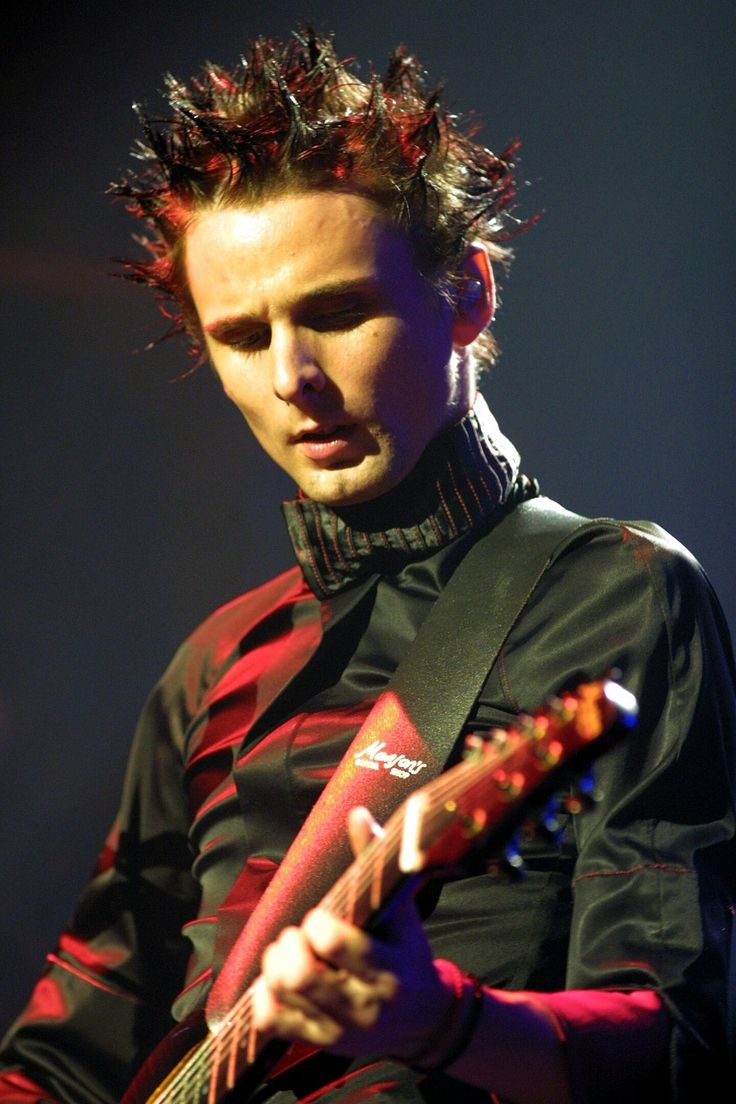
Bellamy performing in 2001

At Teignmouth Community School, Devon, Bellamy played in a number of bands, including Carnage Mayhem and Gothic Plague with drummer Dominic Howard. When members of Gothic Plague left because of other interests, Bellamy and Howard asked bassist Chris Wolstenholme to join. In 1994, using the name Rocket Baby Dolls, they won the school's "Battle of the Bands" which led them to take the band more seriously, and changed their name to Muse.

Muse have gone on to worldwide success. Muse blends alternative, art rock, experimental rock, progressive rock, classical music, electronica and many other styles. The band is also well known for its energetic and visually dazzling live performances. On 16–17 June 2007, Muse became the first band to sell out the newly built Wembley Stadium in London.

Muse released their debut album, Showbiz, in 1999, showcasing Bellamy's falsetto and a melancholic alternative rock style. Their second album, Origin of Symmetry (2001), expanded their sound, incorporating wider instrumentation and romantic classical influences, and earned them a reputation for energetic live performances. Absolution (2003) saw further classical influence, with orchestra on tracks such as "Butterflies and Hurricanes", and became the first of seven consecutive UK number-one albums.

Black Holes and Revelations (2006) incorporated electronic and pop elements, influenced by 1980s groups such as Depeche Mode, displayed in singles such as "Supermassive Black Hole". The album brought Muse wider international success. The Resistance (2009) and The 2nd Law (2012) explored themes of government oppression and civil uprising and cemented Muse as one of the world's major stadium acts. Their seventh album, Drones (2015), was a concept album about drone warfare and returned to a harder rock sound. Their eighth album, Simulation Theory (2018), featuring a retro 1980s style, was released on 9 November 2018. Their ninth album, Will of The People, was released on 26 August 2022. Their tenth, The Wow! Signal, featuring more personal lyrics influenced by Bellamy's separation from his wife, Elle Evans, was released on 26 June 2026.

Muse's awards include two Grammy Awards (winning the Grammys for Best Rock Album for The Resistance and Drones) two Brit Awards (winning Best British Live Act twice) five MTV Europe Music Awards and eight NME Awards. In 2012, they received the Ivor Novello Award for International Achievement from the British Academy of Songwriters, Composers and Authors. Muse have sold over 30 million albums worldwide.

== Musicianship ==
=== Vocals ===
Bellamy has a tenor vocal range. Many Muse songs are recognisable by his use of vibrato, falsetto, and melismatic phrasing, influenced by the American songwriter Jeff Buckley. Bellamy said he did not believe his high-pitched singing would be suitable for rock music until he heard Buckley's 1994 album Grace. He had wanted to be a "harder" singer, working in genres such as metal or hard rock, but said his "soft” voice pushed Muse towards alternative rock. He said: "If I could have done Zack de la Rocha, I would. If I could have done Nirvana, I would. But I didn't have that voice." He sometimes uses distortion on his vocals to mimic the sound of a guitar.

=== Instrumentation ===
Bellamy performing in 2018 at the Royal Albert Hall

After playing piano as a child, Bellamy took up piano again for "Sunburn" on the first Muse album, Showbiz, and began incorporating piano into further songs.

Bellamy's earliest guitar influences were Kurt Cobain and Jimi Hendrix; he admired their "element of chaos, an element of being slightly out of control". He sometimes uses tapping techniques. He said: "I'm not the most technical player. I never spent years doing scales and runs, and I never studied the intricacies of sweep picking ... I like some of the struggle that comes out in my playing. I think there’s some humanity in it." Bellamy described his style as a combination of Tom Morello of Rage Against the Machine and the "shimmering atmospherics" of the U2 guitarist the Edge.

=== Equipment ===
Bellamy often uses pitch-shift effects (such as the DigiTech Whammy) and arpeggiators to create a more "electronic" sound, citing Hendrix and Morello as influences. He uses effects to create synthesiser-like guitar tones, and sometimes merges his guitar parts with synthesiser parts. He often uses a Fuzz Factory, a fuzz distortion effect.

Since the early 2000s, Bellamy has worked with Manson Guitar Works, based in Devon, to create his electric guitars. In 2019, he purchased a majority stake in Manson. Manson has released several "M-series" signature models. Bellamy's guitars have built-in Fuzz Factory and MXR Phase 90 effects, and touch-controlled MIDI controllers, which control Kaoss Pad effects processors; the Guardian described Bellamy as "undoubtedly the Kaoss rock star". He has used seven-string and eight-string guitars on songs including "Citizen Erased", "Unravelling" and "Shimmering Scars". In 2020, Bellamy purchased the Fender Telecaster used by Buckley for Grace. According to Bellamy, its pickups are out of phase, creating a "super-glassy" tone. He used it to record his album Cryosleep, with the Jaded Hearts Club and with Muse.

=== Lyrics ===
Bellamy's lyrics incorporate political and dystopian themes. Books that have influenced his lyrics include Nineteen Eighty-Four by George Orwell, Confessions of an Economic Hitman by John Perkins, Hyperspace by Michio Kaku, The 12th Planet by Zecharia Sitchin and Trance Formation of America by Cathy O'Brien.

== Other work ==
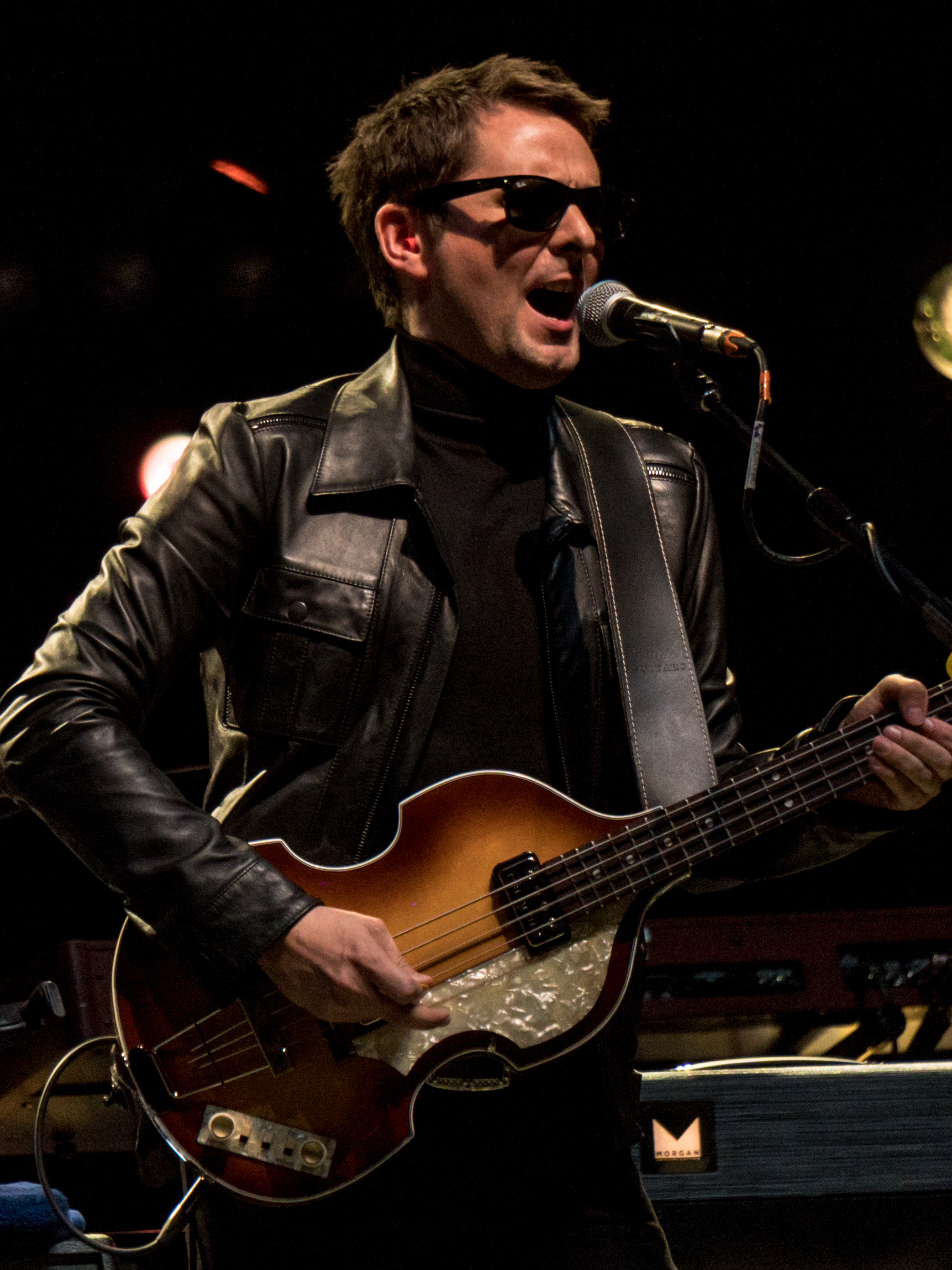
Bellamy playing a Höfner 500/1 bass guitar with the Jaded Hearts Club in 2018

Bellamy co-wrote the end credits for the 2009 film The International. He wrote "Soaked", which appears on Adam Lambert's debut album, For Your Entertainment (2009). Bellamy appears as a playable character in the video game Guitar Hero 5, along with the Muse song "Plug In Baby". He contributed to the second album by the New Zealand artist Kimbra, The Golden Echo (2014).

In 2017, Bellamy cofounded a supergroup, the Jaded Hearts Club, to perform covers of Beatles songs. Their repertoire grew to include songs by other acts. The other members include the singer Miles Kane, the Nine Inch Nails drummer Ilan Rubin and the drummer Sean Payne. Bellamy plays bass; he said, "It's nice being the lukewarm water in the background rather than [having] to be up the front there." He said of the covers: "It was such a different area of music to explore for me ... the development of where the kind of music that ended up becoming Muse over the course of decades in terms of the evolution of rock, going back to where it first started." Bellamy produced the Jaded Hearts Club's debut album, You've Always Been Here (2020).

Bellamy released his first solo track, "Pray", on For the Throne, a 2019 compilation album of music inspired by the TV series Game of Thrones. In May 2020, Bellamy released, "Tomorrow's World", inspired by life under lockdown during the COVID-19 pandemic. In June, he released an acoustic version of the 1999 Muse song "Unintended". Bellamy released a compilation of solo work, Cryosleep, on 16 July 2021 for Record Store Day.

With the British composer Ilan Eshkeri, Bellamy wrote the score for a 2024 audiobook adaptation of the novel Nineteen Eighty-Four for Audible. It was performed by a 60-piece orchestra at Abbey Road Studios. The Guardian said the score "brims with melodrama and menace". Bellamy and Eshkeri also composed the soundtrack of the Paramount+ crime drama series, MobLand, which premiered in 2025. In April 2026, Bellamy made a surprise appearance during Anyma's performance at Coachella, singing the unreleased song "Carrier of Souls".

== Accolades ==
In 2004, Total Guitar readers voted Bellamy the 29th-greatest guitarist and his "Plug in Baby" riff the 13th-greatest riff. In 2008, Gigwise named Bellamy the 19th-greatest guitarist ever.

In April 2005, Kerrang! named Bellamy the 28th-sexiest person in rock. Cosmopolitan also chose him as the sexiest rocker of 2003 and 2004. NME named him the 14th-greatest "rock 'n' roll hero", ahead of John Lennon and Bob Dylan. Bellamy also won the Sexiest Male Award at the 2007 NME Awards. He won again in 2009, 2010, 2011, 2013 and 2014 and was nominated in 2012. Bellamy, however, declared himself "too short to be sexy" (he is 5' 7"), and said the award should have gone to Dominic Howard, Muse's drummer. Bellamy also won the "Hero of the Year" award at the 2012 NME Awards. On 26 September 2008, the University of Plymouth awarded the members of Muse an honorary doctorate degree for their work in music.

In the January 2010 edition of Total Guitar, Bellamy was named "Guitarist of the Decade" and was proclaimed to be "the Hendrix of his generation". In the Guinness Book of World Records 2010, Bellamy is credited as holding the world record for most guitars smashed on a tour. His record, 140, was set during the Absolution tour. In April 2010, Bellamy was named the eighth-best frontman by the readers of Q. In December 2010, MusicRadar readers voted Bellamy the ninth-greatest lead singer. In 2010, a BBC Radio 6 Music survey named Bellamy the third-best guitarist of the last 30 years.

== Political views ==
Bellamy describes himself as a "left-leaning libertarian" and "in the realm of" Noam Chomsky. He supports decentralised government, decarbonisation, land value tax, limits on the size of corporations, and the abolition of the British monarchy and abolition of the House of Lords. In 2022, Bellamy used the term "meta-centrism" to describe his political views, calling it "an oscillation between liberal, libertarian values for individuals ... but then more socialist on things like land ownership, nature and energy distribution". He invests in startups in Silicon Valley focusing on clean energy. He said: "That has given me optimism. When you hear their ideas and their vision for the future, it does give you genuine hope that a lot of the biggest issues we're facing could be solved."

Earlier in his career, Bellamy expressed interest in conspiracy theories, including theories about the 9/11 terror attacks. He disowned conspiracy theories in later years, saying they had been "hijacked" by rightwing politics, and that he had "become far more rational and empirical" and was more focused on "more realistic, tangible things". In 2022, he described conspiracy theories as quackery, saying they were attractive because they distracted from pressing issues and that "there's a comfort that maybe human beings somewhere, even if they're evil, are in control, when in fact the truth is far more frightening – there are no humans in control and it's all a bunch of chaos". Bellamy received vaccinations against COVID-19 and supported masking during the COVID-19 pandemic.

Bellamy expressed discomfort when the lyrics of Muse's 2009 album The Resistance were adopted by the rightwing Fox News anchor Glenn Beck, and when their song "Uprising" was used in YouTube videos advocating for conspiracy theories. Muse refused requests from American politicians to use "Uprising" in their rallies.

== Personal life ==
Bellamy began dating the American actress Kate Hudson in mid-2010. They became engaged in April 2011. Their son was born in July 2011. In December 2014, Bellamy and Hudson announced that they had ended their engagement.

In February 2015, Bellamy began dating the American model Elle Evans. They married on 10 August 2019. Their daughter was born in June 2020, and their son in May 2024. Bellamy and Evans separated in mid-2025. Bellamy said the split was unexpected and influenced the writing of the tenth Muse album, The Wow! Signal (2026). Bellamy filed for divorce on 12 August 2026 and requested custody of their children.

In February 2017, Bellamy bought the former home of the tennis player Pete Sampras, a 6,900-square-foot (640 m^{2}) estate in Brentwood, Los Angeles, for $6.9 million. As of 2022, Bellamy was living in Los Angeles during school periods to be close to his son and spending the school holidays in London. That year, Bellamy said he was considering applying for an Irish passport to regain his European Union citizenship following Brexit, as he qualified through his Belfast-born mother. He announced during a show in Dublin the following year that he had received his Irish passport.

== Discography ==
Muse

- Showbiz (1999)
- Origin of Symmetry (2001)
- Hullabaloo Soundtrack (2002)
- Absolution (2003)
- Black Holes and Revelations (2006)
- The Resistance (2009)
- The 2nd Law (2012)
- Drones (2015)
- Simulation Theory (2018)
- Will of the People (2022)
- The Wow! Signal (2026)

The Jaded Hearts Club

- You've Always Been Here (2020)

Solo

- "End Title" (2009) (The International, soundtrack)
- "Pray (High Valyrian)" (For the Throne, soundtrack album)
- "Tomorrow's World" (2020)
- "Unintended" (Acoustic version) (2020)
- "Behold, the Glove" (2020)
- "Simulation Theory Theme" (2020)
- Cryosleep (2021)

Guest appearances

- "90s Music" – guitar, released on The Golden Echo album by Kimbra
- "Descensus" - guitar, released on Telos by Zedd
