= Derelicts (album) =

Studio album by Carbon Based Lifeforms
- Released: October 6, 2017
- Genres: Ambient, Downtempo, Acid house, Psydub
- Length: 1:22:18
- Label: Blood Music (physical) Leftfield Records (digital)
- Producer: Carbon Based Lifeforms

Carbon Based Lifeforms chronology
Twentythree (2011)	Derelicts (2017)	Stochastic (2021)

Professional ratings
Review scores
Source	Rating
Release Magazine	8/10
SpazioRock	8/10
Sputnikmusic	3.8/5
Synth & Sequences	4.5/5 stars
The Wonky Angle	8/10
Zero Music Magazine	9/10

Derelicts is the fifth studio album and ninth full-length release by Swedish duo Carbon Based Lifeforms, released on October 6, 2017. It is their first album release following a six-year hiatus. Writing for the album began in 2015. Derelicts returns to the sound of Hydroponic Garden, World of Sleepers, and Interloper, after their experiment into drone on the album Twentythree. It is the first album by Carbon Based Lifeforms to be self-published and was not released by their previous label Ultimae Records. It was released on CD, Vinyl, and downloadable 24-bit FLAC. The album peaked at number 12 on the USA Billboard Dance/Electronic chart and number 11 on the UK Top Dance Albums chart based on album sales. It was voted by fans the best album of 2017 on a psychedelic-downtempo focused music site. Songs from the album have been featured on US radio stations.

== Composition and content ==
Track 1 titled "Accede" became the first track in the history of Carbon Based Lifeforms to have a music video.

Track 3 titled "Clouds" is named after the Mutable Instruments Clouds texture synthesizer.

== Artwork ==
The album artwork was designed by Matto Fredriksson, who had designed the album artwork for all previous studio albums and EP releases produced by Carbon Based Lifeforms. Fredriksson describes the inspiration for the album cover saying, "[The] album title, Derelicts, [has] an interesting meaning to it. I think CBLs music is in someway in the intersection of mind, machine and nature...the color red, which is significant on this cover, was something that came naturally. Derelicts was CBLs first proper full length album in a good while and I felt that there was this energy about it...red became, for me, sort of a symbol of that intense nerve that anticipation is."

== Track listing ==
Derelicts starts at track 1, indicating it is not a sequel to the album Twentythree or part of the World of Sleepers series.

All tracks are written by Carbon Based Lifeforms.

No.	Title	Length
1.	"Accede"	5:43
2.	"Derelicts"	6:12
3.	"Clouds"	4:30
4.	"Nattväsen"	5:38
5.	"Equilibrium"	8:56
6.	"Path of Least Resistance"	6:40
7.	"780 Days"	6:16
8.	"~42°"	4:55
9.	"Rayleigh Scatterers"	5:12
10.	"Dodecahedron"	8:43
11.	"Loss Aversion"	5:12
12.	"Everwave"	14:21
Total length:		82:18

== Personnel ==
- Daniel Vadestrid - synthesizer, harmonies
- Johannes Hedberg - rhythms, basslines
- Ester Nannmark - vocals on tracks 2, 8, 9, and 11
- Vincent Villuis - audio mastering
