= Polyrhythm =

Simultaneous use of two or more conflicting rhythms

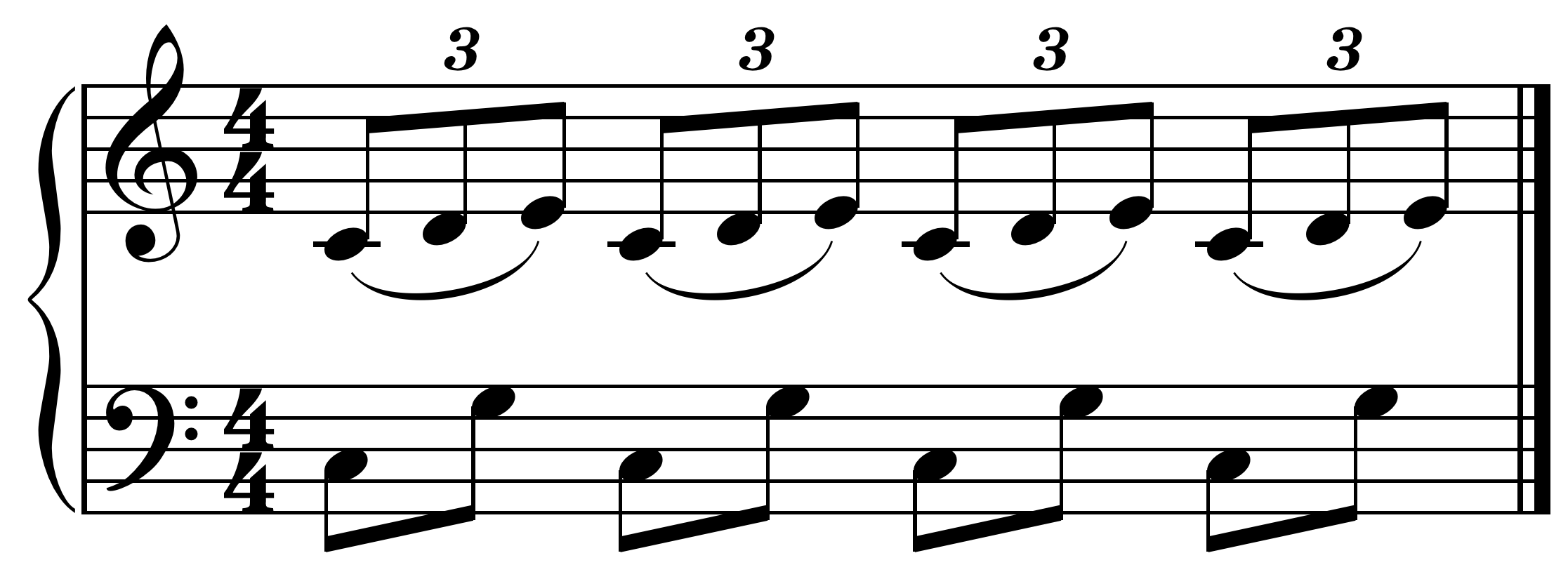
Polyrhythm: Triplets over duplets in all four beats

2:3 polyrhythm (cross rhythm) as bounce inside oval

Polyrhythm (/ˈpɒlirɪðəm/) is the simultaneous use of two or more rhythms that are not readily perceived as deriving from one another, or as simple manifestations of the same meter. The rhythmic layers may be the basis of an entire piece of music (cross-rhythm), or a momentary section. Polyrhythms can be distinguished from irrational rhythms, which can occur within the context of a single part; polyrhythms require at least two rhythms to be played concurrently, one of which is typically an irrational rhythm. Concurrently in this context means within the same rhythmic cycle. The underlying pulse, whether explicit or implicit can be considered one of the concurrent rhythms. For example, the son clave is polyrhythmic because its three section suggests a different meter from the pulse of the entire pattern.

== In western art music ==
In some European art music, polyrhythm periodically contradicts the prevailing meter. For example, in Mozart's opera Don Giovanni, two orchestras are heard playing together in different metres (3/4 and 2/4):

Mozart Don Giovanni 2 dances together

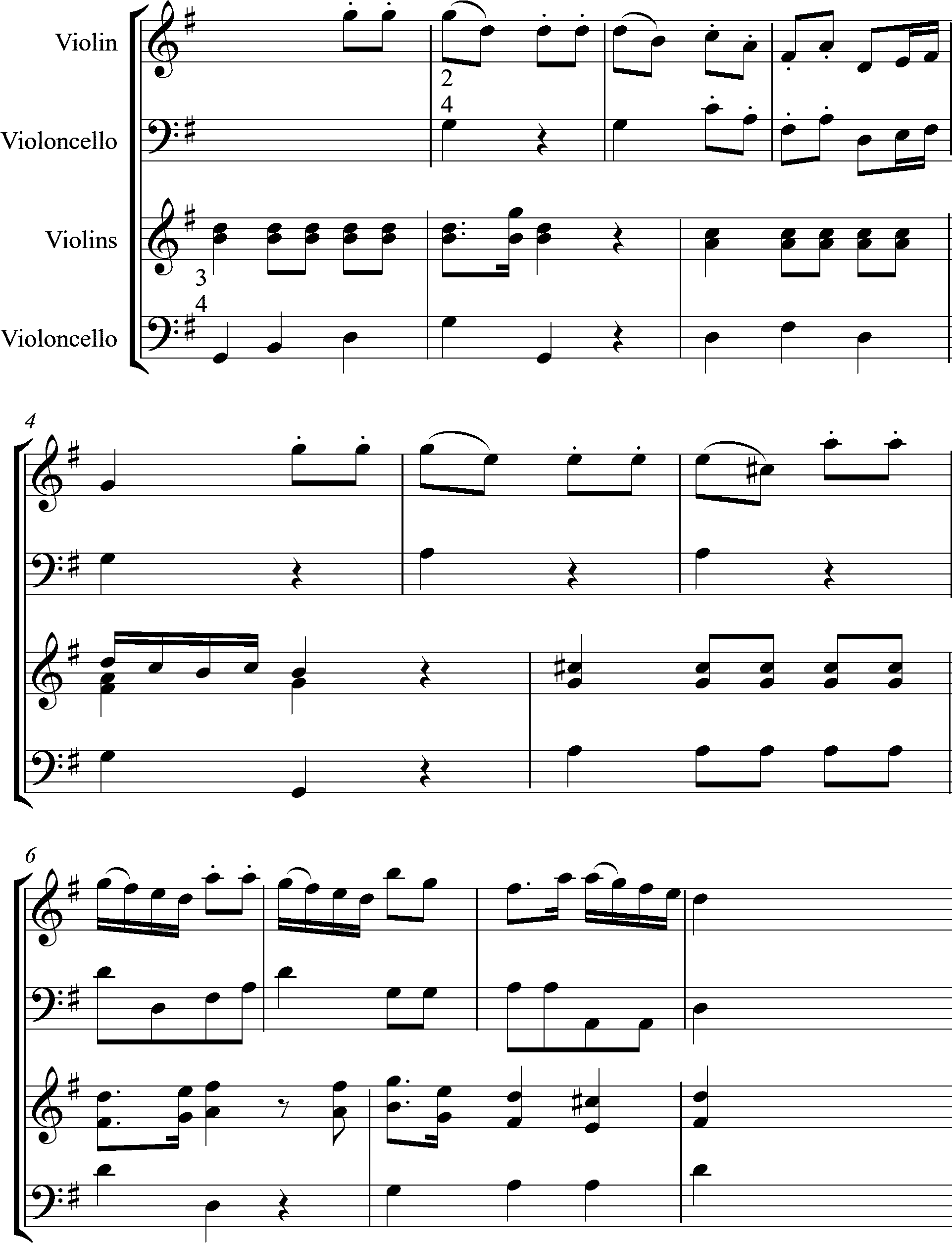
Mozart, Don Giovanni dances from act 1, scene 5

They are later joined by a third band, playing in 3/8 time.

Polyrhythm is heard near the opening of Beethoven's Symphony No. 3. (See also syncopation.)

Chopin often explored the rhythmic possibilities inherent in the independence of a pianist's two hands. A spectacular example may be found in his Étude, Op, 10 No. 10. Alan Walker comments that while this piece is straightforward for listeners, "From the player’s point of view, however, nothing is straightforward. Chopin has placed him inside a veritable hornets’ nest of cross-rhythms and syncopations. The melody first emerges from a background of triplets, then of duplets. Accents are changed without warning, shifting the balance of the phrase sideways, so to speak, together with the place of each note within it."

Polyrhythm is a particularly common feature of the music of Brahms. Writing about the Violin Sonata in G major, Op. 78, Jan Swafford (1997, p. 456) says "In the first movement Brahms plays elaborate games with the phrasing, switching the stresses of the 6/4 meter back and forth between 3+3 and 2+2+2, or superimposing both in violin and piano. These ideas gather at the climax at measure 235, with the layering of phrases making an effect that perhaps during the 19th century only Brahms could have conceived."

Brahms Violin Sonata in G, 1, bars 235ff

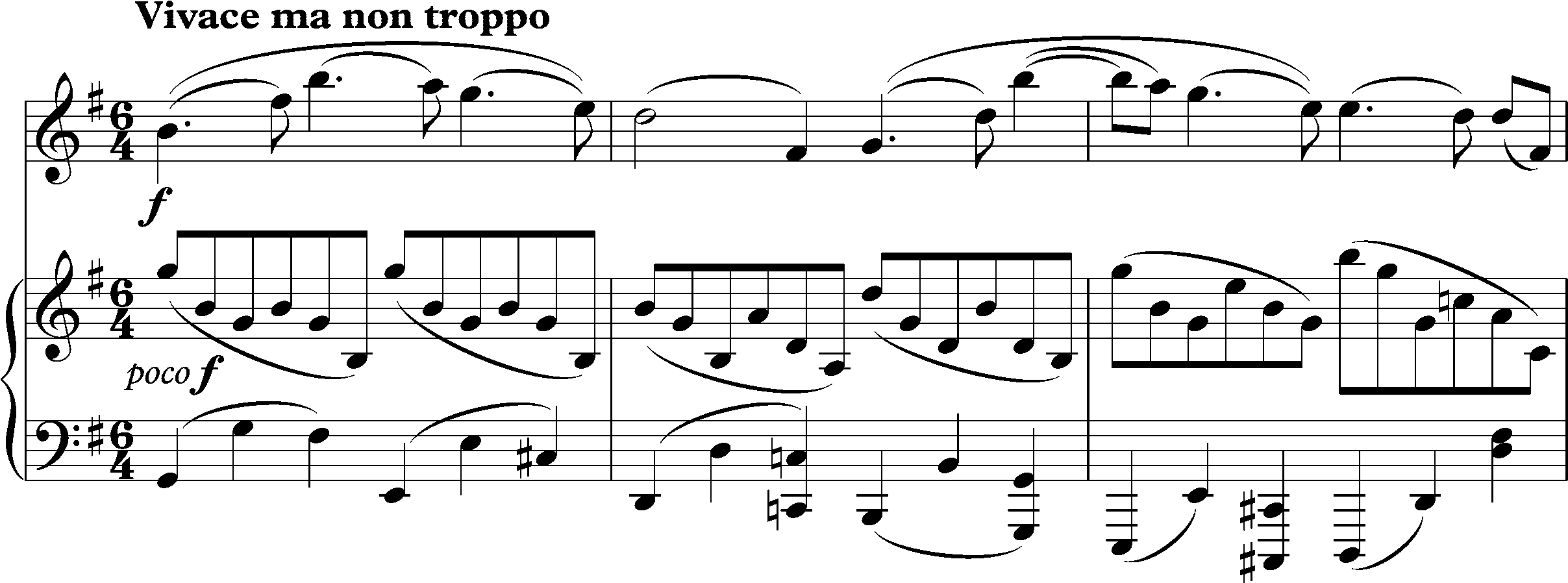
Brahms Violin Sonata in G, 1, bars 235ff

In "The Snow Is Dancing" from his Children's Corner suite, Debussy introduces a melody "on a static, repeated B-flat, cast in triplet-division cross rhythms which offset this stratum independently of the sixteenth notes comprising the two dancing-snowflake lines below it." "In this section great attention to the exactitude of rhythms is demanded by the polyrhythmic superposition of pedals, ostinato, and melody."

Debussy, "The Snow Is Dancing", bars 34–38

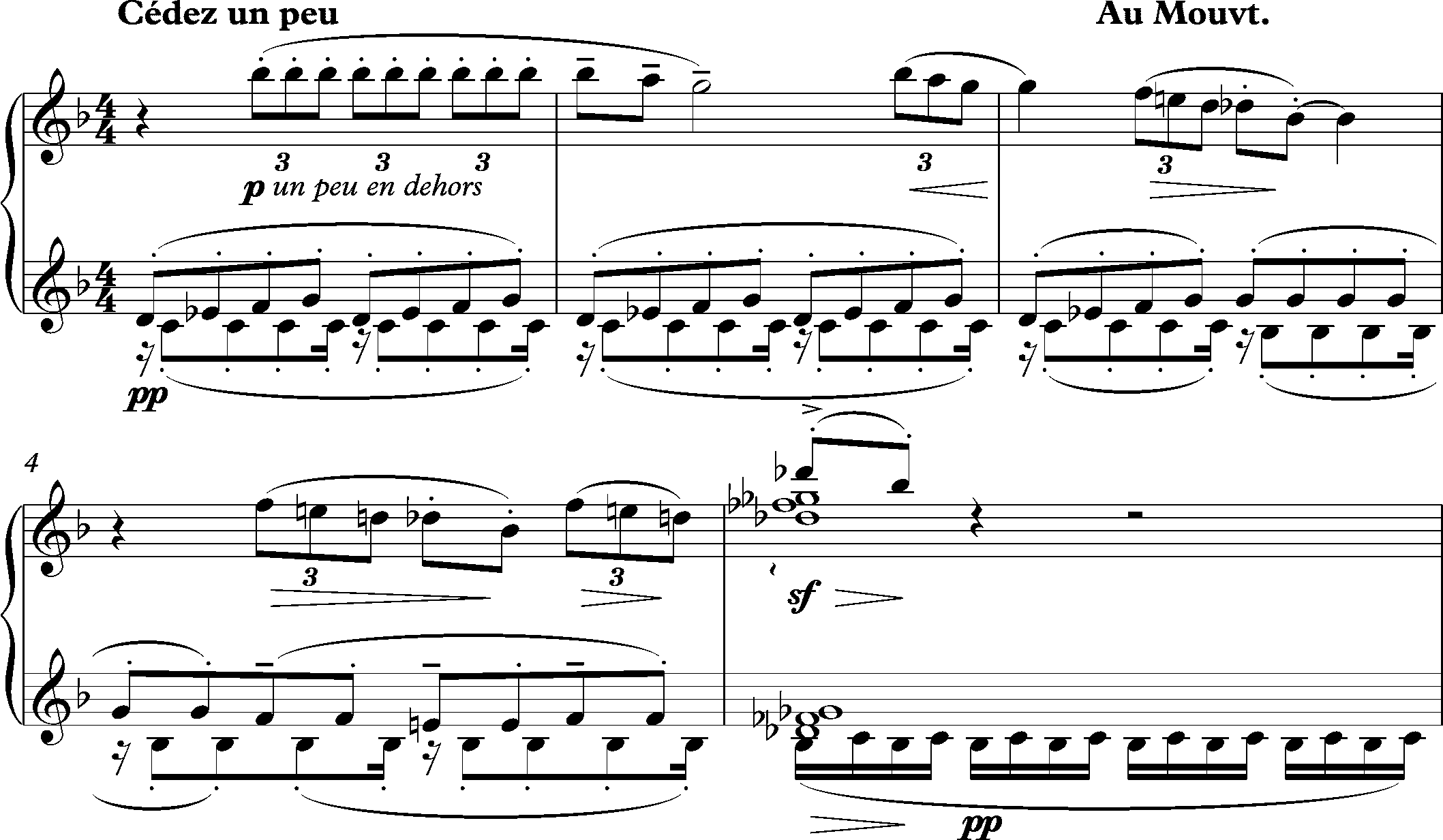
Debussy, "The Snow Is Dancing", bars 34–38

=== Hemiola ===
Concerning the use of a two-over-three (2:3) hemiola in Beethoven's String Quartet No. 6, Ernest Walker states, "The vigorously effective Scherzo is in 3/4 time, but with a curiously persistent cross-rhythm that does its best to persuade us that it is really in 6/8."

Beethoven Scherzo from String Quartet, Op. 18, No. 6

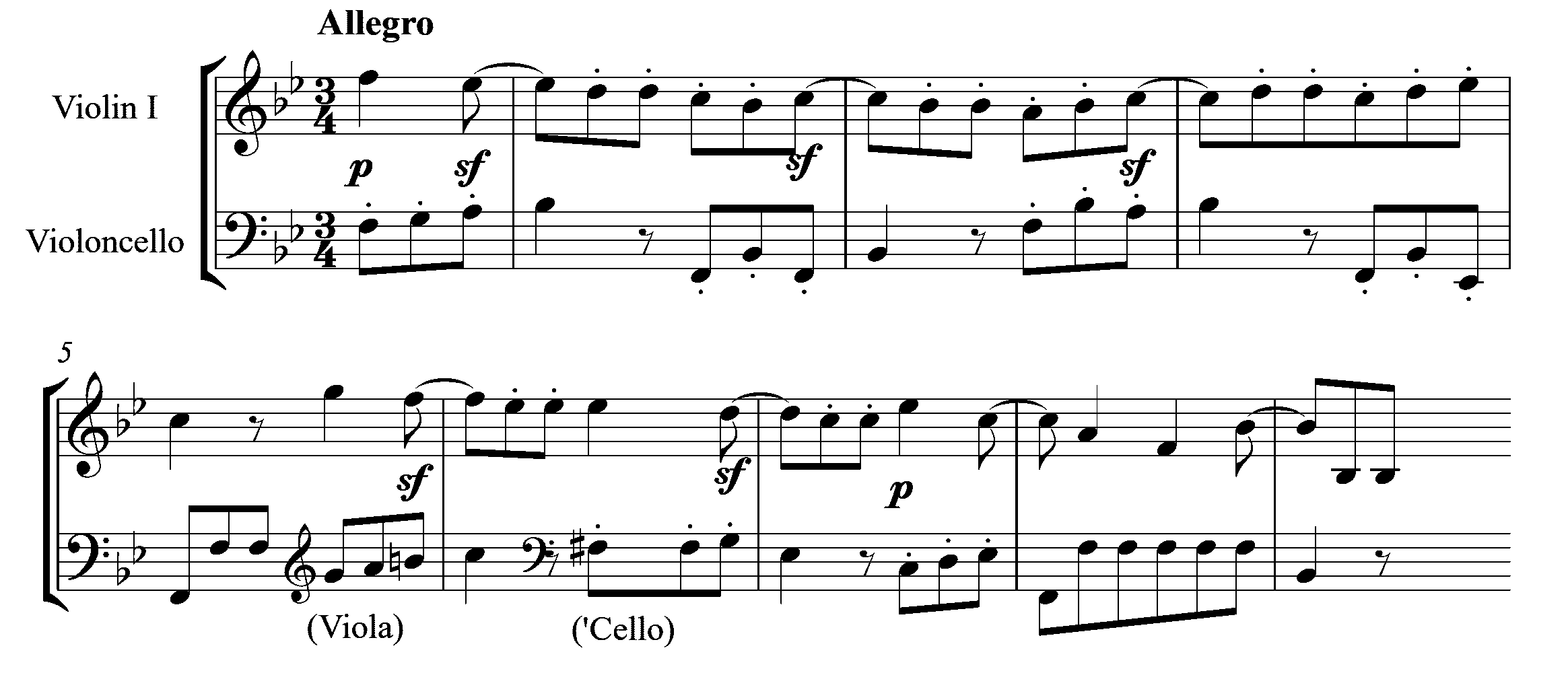
Beethoven Scherzo from Op. 18, No. 6, violin and cello only

=== Polyrhythm, not polymeter ===
The illusion of simultaneous 3/4 and 6/8, suggests polymeter: triple meter combined with compound duple meter.

However, the two beat schemes interact within a metric hierarchy (a single meter). The triple beats are primary and the duple beats are secondary; the duple beats are cross-beats within a triple beat scheme.

=== Composite hemiola ===
The four-note ostinato pattern of Mykola Leontovych's "Carol of the Bells" (the first measure below) is the composite of the two-against-three hemiola (the second measure).

Another example of polyrhythm can be found in measures 64 and 65 of the first movement of Mozart's Piano Sonata No. 12. Three evenly-spaced sets of three attack-points span two measures.

== Cross-rhythm ==
Cross-rhythm refers to systemic polyrhythm. The Concise Oxford Dictionary of Music defines it as “The Regular shift of some beats in a metric pattern to points ahead of or behind their normal positions.” The finale of Brahms Symphony No. 2 features a passage where the prevailing metre of four beats to the bar becomes disrupted. Here is the passage as notated in the score:

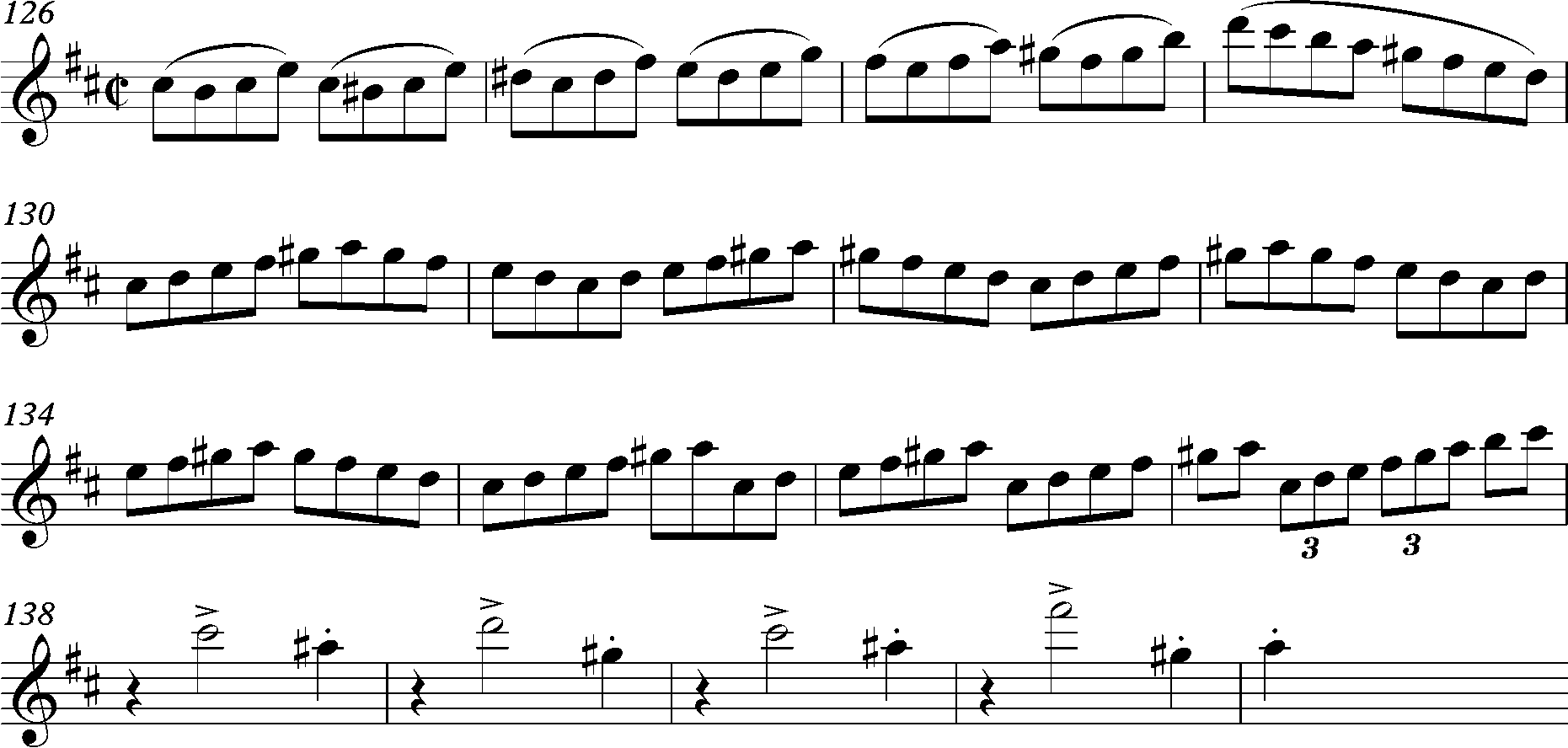
Brahms Symphony No. 2, finale, bars 126-142

Here is the same passage re-barred to clarify how the ear may actually experience the changing metres:

Brahms Symphony No. 2, finale, bars 126-142

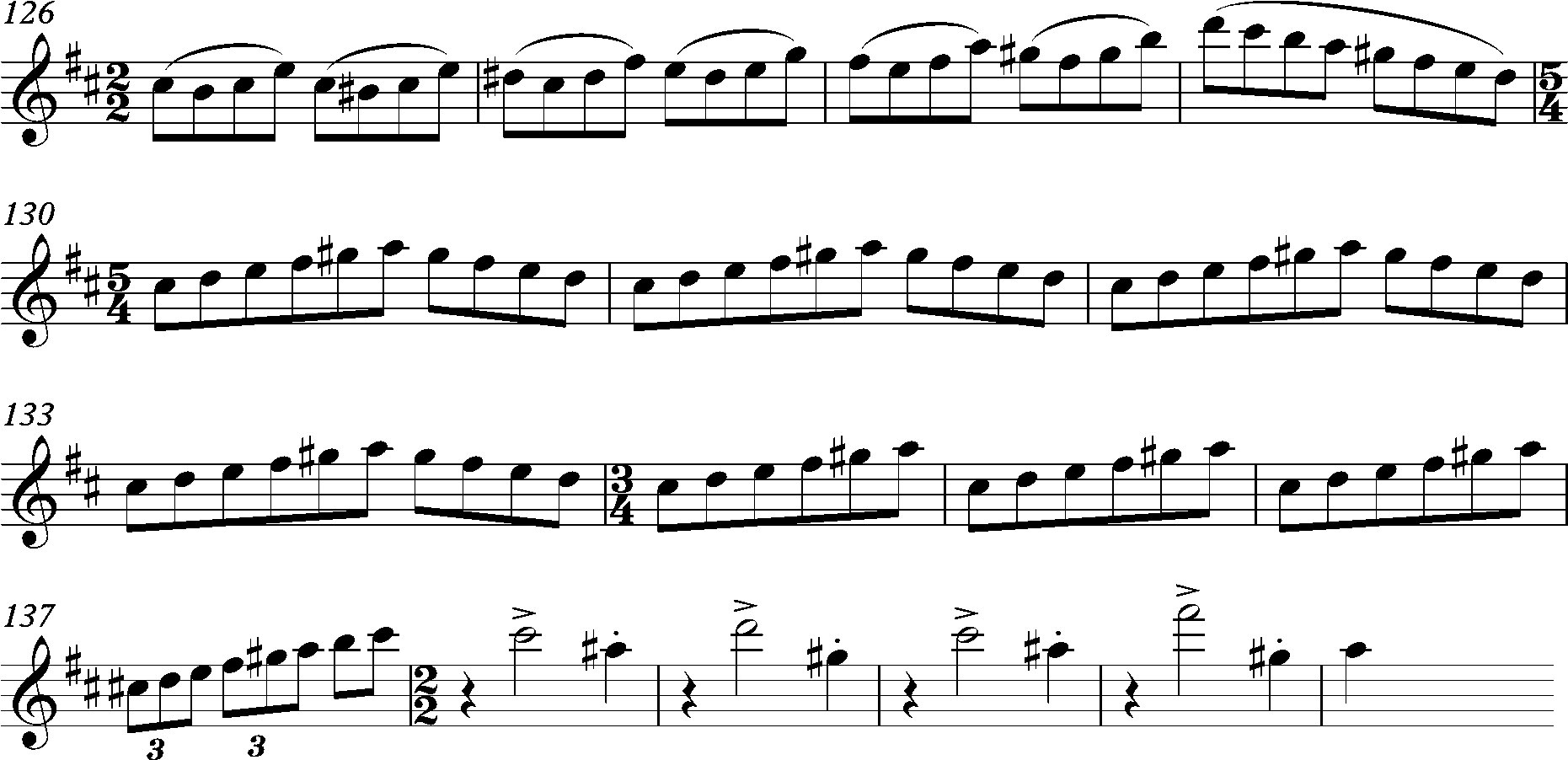
Brahms Symphony No. 2, finale, bars 126–142, re-barred

“Polyrhythms run through Brahms’s music like an obsessive-compulsive streak...For Brahms, subdividing a measure of time into different units and layering different patterns on top of one another seemed to be almost a compulsion — as well as a compositional device and an engine of expression. ”

Another straightforward example of a cross-rhythm is 3 evenly spaced notes against 2 (3:2), also known as a hemiola. Two simple and common ways to express this pattern in standard western musical notation would be 3 quarter notes over 2 dotted quarter notes within one bar of 6/8 time, quarter note triplets over 2 quarter notes within one bar of 2/4 time. Other cross-rhythms are 4:3 (with 4 dotted eighth notes over 3 quarter notes within a bar of 3/4 time as an example in standard western musical notation), 5:2, 5:3, 5:4, etc.

Representation of 4 beats parallel to 5 beats

In auditory processing, rhythms are perceived as pitches once they have been sufficiently sped up. Furthermore, intervals of rhythms are perceived as intervals of pitch once sufficiently sped up. As such, there is a parallel between cross-rhythms and musical intervals: in an audible frequency range, the 2:3 ratio produces the musical interval of a perfect fifth, the 3:4 ratio produces a perfect fourth, and the 4:5 ratio produces a major third. All these interval ratios are found in the harmonic series. These are called harmonic polyrhythms.

== Sub-Saharan African music traditions ==
=== Comparing European and Sub-Saharan African meter ===
In traditional European ("Western") rhythms, the most fundamental parts typically emphasize the primary beats. By contrast, in rhythms of sub-Saharan African origin, the most fundamental parts typically emphasize the secondary beats. This often causes the uninitiated ear to misinterpret the secondary beats as the primary beats, and to hear the true primary beats as cross-beats. In other words, the musical "background" and "foreground" may mistakenly be heard and felt in reverse—Peñalosa (2009: 21)

=== The generating principle ===
In non-Saharan African music traditions, cross-rhythm is the generating principle; the meter is in a permanent state of contradiction. Cross-rhythm was first explained as the basis of non-Saharan rhythm in lectures by C.K. Ladzekpo and the writings of David Locke.

From the philosophical perspective of the African musician, cross-beats can symbolize the challenging moments or emotional stress we all encounter. Playing cross-beats while fully grounded in the main beats, prepares one for maintaining a life-purpose while dealing with life's challenges. Many non-Saharan languages do not have a word for rhythm, or even music. From the African viewpoint, the rhythms represent the very fabric of life itself; they are an embodiment of the people, symbolizing interdependence in human relationships—Peñalosa (2009: 21).

At the center of a core of rhythmic traditions within which the composer conveys his ideas is the technique of cross-rhythm. The technique of cross-rhythm is a simultaneous use of contrasting rhythmic patterns within the same scheme of accents or meter... By the very nature of the desired resultant rhythm, the main beat scheme cannot be separated from the secondary beat scheme. It is the interplay of the two elements that produces the cross-rhythmic texture—Ladzekpo (1995).

Eugene Novotney observes: "The 3:2 relationship (and [its] permutations) is the foundation of most typical polyrhythmic textures found in West African musics." 3:2 is the generative or theoretic form of non-Saharan rhythmic principles. Victor Kofi Agawu succinctly states, "[The] resultant [3:2] rhythm holds the key to understanding... there is no independence here, because 2 and 3 belong to a single Gestalt."

The two beat schemes interact within the hierarchy of a single meter. The duple beats are primary and the triple beats are secondary. The example below shows the African 3:2 cross-rhythm within its proper metric structure.

The music of African xylophones, such as the balafon and gyil, is often based on cross-rhythm. In the following example, a Ghanaian gyil sounds a 3:2-based ostinato melody. The left hand (lower notes) sounds the two main beats, while the right hand (upper notes) sounds the three cross-beats. The cross-beats are written as quarter-notes for visual emphasis.

The following notated example is from the kushaura part of the traditional mbira piece "Nhema Mussasa". The mbira is a lamellophone. The left hand plays the ostinato bass line while the right hand plays the upper melody. The composite melody is an embellishment of the 3:2 cross-rhythm.

=== Adaptive instruments ===
Sub-Saharan instruments are constructed in a variety of ways to generate polyrhythmic melodies. Some instruments organize the pitches in a uniquely divided alternate array, not in the straight linear bass to treble structure that is so common to many western instruments such as the piano, harp, or marimba.

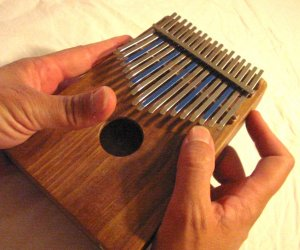
Hugh Tracey Treble Kalimba

Lamellophones including mbira, mbila, mbira huru, mbira njari, mbira nyunga, marimba, karimba, kalimba, likembe, and okeme. This family of instruments are found in several forms indigenous to different regions of Africa and most often have equal tonal ranges for right and left hands. The kalimba is a modern version of these instruments originated by the pioneer ethnomusicologist Hugh Tracey in the early 20th century which has over the years gained worldwide popularity.

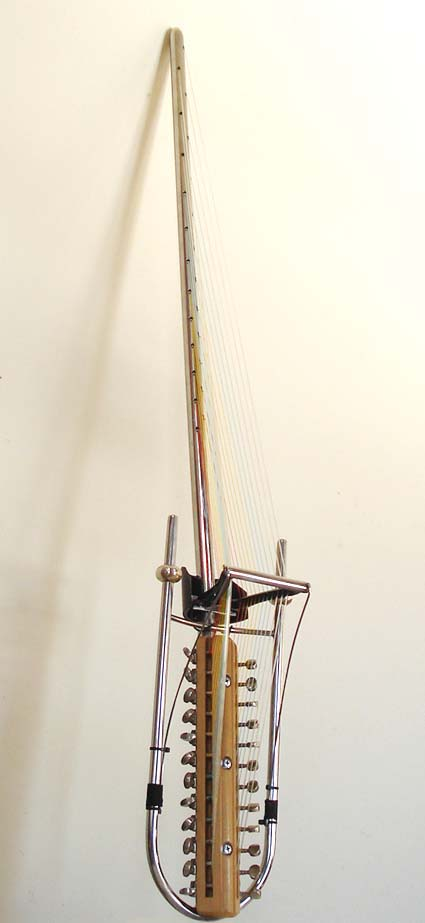
Signature Series Gravikord

Chordophones, such as the West African kora, and doussn'gouni, part of the harp-lute family of instruments, also have this African separated double tonal array structure.Another instrument, the Marovany from Madagascar is a double sided box zither which also employs this divided tonal structure. Trough zithers also have the ability to play polyrhythms.

The Gravikord is a new American instrument closely related to both the African kora and the kalimba was created in the latter 20th century to also exploit this adaptive principle in a modern electro-acoustic instrument.

On these instruments, one hand of the musician is not primarily in the bass nor the other primarily in the treble, but both hands can play freely across the entire tonal range of the instrument. Also, the fingers of each hand can play separate independent rhythmic patterns, and these can easily cross over each other from treble to bass and back, either smoothly or with varying amounts of syncopation. This can all be done within the same tight tonal range, without the left and right hand fingers ever physically encountering each other. These simple rhythms will interact musically to produce complex cross rhythms including repeating on beat/off beat pattern shifts that would be very difficult to create by any other means. This characteristically African structure allows often simple playing techniques to combine with each other to produce polyrhythmic music.

== Jazz ==
=== 3:2 cross-rhythm ===
Polyrhythm is a staple of modern jazz. Although not as common, use of systemic cross-rhythm is also found in jazz. In 1959, Mongo Santamaria recorded "Afro Blue", the first jazz standard built upon a typical African 6:4 cross-rhythm (two cycles of 3:2). The song begins with the bass repeatedly playing 6 cross-beats per each measure of 12/8 (6:4). The following example shows the original ostinato "Afro Blue" bass line. The cross noteheads indicate the main beats.

=== 2:3 cross-rhythm ===
The famous jazz drummer Elvin Jones took the opposite approach, superimposing two cross-beats over every measure of a 3/4 jazz waltz (2:3). This swung 3/4 is perhaps the most common example of overt cross-rhythm in jazz. In 1963 John Coltrane recorded "Afro Blue" with Elvin Jones on drums. Coltrane reversed the metric hierarchy of Santamaria's composition, performing it instead in 3/4 swing (2:3).

== In popular music ==
Nigerian percussion master Babatunde Olatunji arrived on the American music scene in 1959 with his album Drums of Passion, which was a collection of traditional Nigerian music for percussion and chanting. The album stayed on the charts for two years and had a profound impact on jazz and American popular music. Trained in the Yoruba sakara style of drumming, Olatunji would have a major impact on Western popular music. He went on to teach, collaborate and record with numerous jazz and rock artists, including Airto Moreira, Carlos Santana and Mickey Hart of the Grateful Dead. Olatunji reached his greatest popularity during the height of the Black Arts Movement of the 1960s and 1970s.

Afro-Cuban music makes extensive use of polyrhythms. Cuban Rumba uses 3-based and 2-based rhythms at the same time. For example, the lead drummer (playing the quinto) might play in 6/8, while the rest of the ensemble keeps playing 2/2. Afro-Cuban conguero, or conga player, Mongo Santamaría was another percussionist whose polyrhythmic virtuosity helped transform both jazz and popular music. Santamaria fused Afro-Latin rhythms with R&B and jazz as a bandleader in the 1950s, and was featured in the 1994 album Buena Vista Social Club, which was the inspiration for the like-titled documentary released five years later.

Another form of polyrhythmic music is south Indian classical Carnatic music. A kind of rhythmic solfege called konnakol is used as a tool to construct highly complex polyrhythms and to divide each beat of a pulse into various subdivisions, with the emphasised beat shifting from beat cycle to beat cycle.

Common polyrhythms found in jazz are 3:2, which manifests as the quarter-note triplet; 2:3, usually in the form of dotted-quarter notes against quarter notes; 4:3, played as dotted-eighth notes against quarter notes (this one demands some technical proficiency to perform accurately, and was not at all common in jazz before Tony Williams used it when playing with Miles Davis); and finally 3/4 time against 4/4, which along with 2:3 was used famously by Elvin Jones and McCoy Tyner playing with John Coltrane.

Frank Zappa, especially towards the end of his career, experimented with complex polyrhythms, such as 11:17, and even nested polyrhythms (see "The Black Page" for an example). The highly avant garde album produced by Frank Zappa, Trout Mask Replica by Captain Beefheart and his Magic Band found extensive use of polyrhythm and cross-rhythm. The metal bands Mudvayne, Nothingface, Threat Signal, Lamb of God, also use polyrhythms in their music. Contemporary progressive metal bands such as Meshuggah, Gojira, Periphery, Textures, TesseracT, Tool, Animals as Leaders, Between the Buried and Me and Dream Theater also incorporate polyrhythms in their music, and polyrhythms have also been increasingly heard in technical metal bands such as Ion Dissonance, The Dillinger Escape Plan, Necrophagist, Candiria, The Contortionist and Textures. Much minimalist and totalist music makes extensive use of polyrhythms. Henry Cowell and Conlon Nancarrow created music with yet more complex polytempo and using irrational numbers like π:e.

Peter Magadini's album Polyrhythm, with musicians Peter Magadini, George Duke, David Young, and Don Menza, features different polyrhythmic themes on each of the six songs.

1. Doin' Time and a Half: Has the polyrhythmic theme of 6 over 4.
2. Five For Barbara: Mostly in 5/4 with a recurring section in 4/4 featuring 5 over 4.
3. The Modulator: The beginning tempo modulates to two times faster and then modulates back to two times slower.
4. Seventy Fourth Ave: In 7/4, with different instruments playing a 4 over the 7 occasionally.
5. Samba de Rollins: Includes a drum solo based on 3 over 4.
6. Midnight Bolero: In 3/4, has a continuous interlude of 2 over 3 and then 4 over 3.

King Crimson used polyrhythms extensively in their 1981 album Discipline. Above all Bill Bruford used polyrhythmic drumming throughout his career.

The band Queen used polyrhythm in their 1974 song "The March of the Black Queen" with 8/8 and 12/8 time signatures.

Talking Heads' Remain in Light used dense polyrhythms throughout the album, most notably on the song "The Great Curve".

Megadeth frequently tends to use polyrhythm in its drumming, notably from songs such as "Sleepwalker" or the ending of "My Last Words", which are both played in 2:3.

Carbon Based Lifeforms have a song named "Polyrytmi", Finnish for "polyrhythm", on their album Interloper. This song indeed does use polyrhythms in its melody.

Aphex Twin makes extensive use of polyrhythms in his electronic compositions.

Japanese girl group Perfume made use of the technique in their single, appropriately titled "Polyrhythm", included on their second album Game. The bridge of the song incorporates 5/8, 6/8 in the vocals, common time (4/4) and 3/2 in the drums.

The Britney Spears single "Till the World Ends" (released March 2011) uses a 4:3 cross-rhythm in its hook.

The outro of the song "Animals" from the album The 2nd Law by the band Muse uses 5/4 and 4/4 time signatures for the guitar and drums respectively.

The Aaliyah song "Quit Hatin" uses 9/8 against 4/4 in the chorus.

The Japanese idol group 3776 makes use of polyrhythm in a number of their songs, most notably on their 2014 mini-album "Love Letter", which features five songs that all include several rhythmic references to the number 3776. A secret track on the album has the group's leader, Ide Chiyono, explain some of the uses of polyrhythm to the listener.

The National song "Fake Empire" uses a 4 over 3 polyrhythm.

The Cars' song "Touch and Go" has a 5/4 rhythm in the drum and bass and a 4/4 rhythm in the keys and vocals.

Harpist and pop folk musician Joanna Newsom is known for the use of polyrhythms on her albums The Milk-Eyed Mender and Ys.

King Gizzard & the Lizard Wizard used polyrhythms extensively throughout their discography, most notably on the album Polygondwanaland.

In Vietnam, bolero songs are composed with 3/4 against 4/4.

The Britney Spears song "...Baby One More Time" contains a 16:9 polyrhythm in the beginning of the music video (the boot tapping 16 times every 9 times the clock ticks - a full cycle can be heard from 0:05 to 0:14).

The Sky Signals song "Amaterasu" is constructed around a 5:4 polyrhythm.

== Examples ==
The following is an example of a 3 against 2 polyrhythm, given in time unit box system (TUBS) notation; each box represents a fixed unit of time; time progresses from the left of the diagram to the right. It is in bad form to teach a student to play 3:2 polyrhythms as simply quarter note, eighth note, eighth note, quarter note. The proper way is to establish sound bases for both the quarter-notes, and the triplet-quarters, and then to layer them upon each other, forming multiple rhythms. Beats are indicated with an X; rests are indicated with a blank.

3 against 2 polyrhythm
3-beat rhythm	X	X		X	X	X		X	X	X		X	X	X		X
2-beat rhythm	X		X		X		X		X		X		X		X	

A common memory aid to help with the 3 against 2 polyrhythm is that it has the same rhythm as the phrase "not difficult"; the simultaneous beats occur on the word "not"; the second and third of the triple beat land on "dif" and "cult", respectively. The second 2-beat lands on the "fi" in "difficult". Try saying "not difficult" over and over in time with the sound file above. This will emphasize the "3 side" of the 3 against 2 feel. Now try saying the phrase "not a problem", stressing the syllables "not" and "prob-". This will emphasize the "2 side" of the 3 against 2 feel. More phrases with the same rhythm are "cold cup of tea", "four funny frogs", "come, if you please", and "ring, Christmas bells".

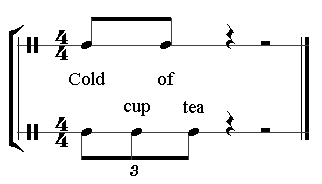

Similar phrases for the 4 against 3 polyrhythm are "pass the golden butter" or "pass the goddamn butter" and "what atrocious weather" (or "what a load of rubbish" in British English); the 4 against 3 polyrhythm is shown below.

4 against 3 polyrhythm
4-beat rhythm	X	X		X		X	X	X		X		X
3-beat rhythm	X		X		X		X		X		X	

A 3 against 4 polyrhythm	Polyrhythm 4/4 with 3/4 simultaneously (cross rhythm) as bounce inside oval

As can be seen from above, the counting for polyrhythms is determined by the lowest common multiple, so if one wishes to count 2 against 3, one needs to count a total of 6 beats, as lcm(2,3) = 6 (123456 and 123456). However this is only useful for very simple polyrhythms, or for getting a feel for more complex ones, as the total number of beats rises quickly. To count 4 against 5, for example, requires a total of 20 beats, and counting thus slows the tempo considerably. However some players, such as classical Indian musicians, can intuitively play high polyrhythms such as 7 against 8.

Polyrhythms are quite common in late Romantic Music and 20th-century classical music. Works for keyboard often set odd rhythms against one another in separate hands. A good example is in the soloist's cadenza in Grieg's Concerto in A Minor; the left hand plays arpeggios of seven notes to a beat; the right hand plays an ostinato of eight notes per beat while also playing the melody in octaves, which uses whole notes, dotted eighth notes, and triplets. Other instances occur often in Rachmaninoff's Piano Concerto No. 2. The piano arpeggios that constitute much of the soloist's material in the first movement often have anywhere from four to eleven notes per beat. In the last movement, the piano's opening run, marked 'quasi glissando', fits 52 notes into the space of one measure, making for a glissando-like effect while keeping the mood of the music. Other instances in this movement include a scale that juxtaposes ten notes in the right hand against four in the left, and one of the main themes in the piano, which imposes an eighth-note melody on a triplet harmony.

=== List of basic polyrhythms ===
First rhythm	Second rhythm	Least common multiple
2	3	6
2	5	10
3	4	12
2	7	14
3	5	15
2	9	18
4	5	20
3	7	21
3	8	24
4	6	12
4	7	28
5	6	30
5	7	35
4	9	36
5	8	40
6	7	42
5	9	45
6	8	24
6	9	18
7	8	56
7	9	63
7	11	77
8	9	72

== See also ==
- Beat (acoustics) – another example of the same effect (mathematically), but with two continuous waves rather than a hit of the instrument only at every peak and trough of either wave.
- Euclidean rhythm
- Sudanese music
- Ewe music
- Xenochrony
