= Interloper =

Interloper, Interlopers or The Interlopers may refer to:

== Entertainment ==
- The Interloper: Lee Harvey Oswald Inside the Soviet Union, a 2013 book by Peter Savodnik
- Interloper Films, a production company
- Interlopers, a 2001 science fiction novel by Alan Dean Foster
- The Interlopers, a Matt Helm spy novel by Donald Hamilton
- "The Interlopers", a short story by Saki
- The Interloper, a 1918 silent feature film directed by Oscar Apfel
- Interloper (album), by Carbon Based Lifeforms

== Other uses ==
- Interloper (business), an outsider who breaks into a market where they are not authorized or welcome to trade
- Interloper (asteroid), a nominal, but not true member of an asteroid family
