= Hydroponic garden =

Hydroponic garden may refer to:

- Hydroponic Garden (album), a 2003 music album by Swedish duo Carbon Based Lifeforms
- A hydroponics garden
