= Thermostatic =

Swedish electronic band

- Genres: Electronic, synthpop, chiptune, bitpop
- Years active: 2003–2010, 2013–present
- Label: Wonderland Records
- Members: Louise Marchione (Lundberg); Peter Marchione; Marcus Larsson; Daniel Vadestrid (Ringström); Johannes Hedberg
- Website: http://www.thermostatic.se

Thermostatic is a Swedish electronic band, formed in Gothenburg in 2003 and consisting of Louise Marchione (Lundberg) as the vocalist, Peter Marchione, Marcus Larsson, Daniel Vadestrid (Ringström) and Johannes Hedberg (the last 2 members also form the electronic duo Carbon Based Lifeforms). Their music can be described as synthpop with chiptune influences, especially bitpop. So far, the band released the studio albums Joy-Toy in 2005 and Humanizer in 2008.

== History ==
Thermostatic formed in Gothenburg in 2003. The band-name Thermostatic was suggested by Michael Strandtoft of the band Helm.

They released their debut album Joy-Toy in May 2005. The band was voted "Best Newcomer 2005" at the Scandinavian Alternative Music Awards. Their second and final album, Humanizer, was released in May 2008.

The group's song "My Ship" was used in trailers for the Penumbra series by Swedish developer Frictional Games.

In April 2010, the group announced that it will no longer work together. Thermostatic played their final concert on May 1, 2010 at the club Sticky Fingers in Gothenburg.

In August 2013, an announcement was made that the group would re-unite to perform a concert at Sticky Fingers. On 25 February 2014 the single "Animal" was released to Bandcamp and iTunes.

== Discography ==
All released under Wonderland Records.

=== Albums ===
- Joy-Toy (2005)
- Humanizer (2008)

=== Singles ===
- "So Close So Near" (2006)
- "Private Machine" (2006)
- "The Box" (2007)
- "Animal" (2014)
- "High" (2020)

=== Music Videos ===
- "Driving" (2008)
