= 3776 wo Kikanai Riyuu ga Aru to Sureba =

Studio album by 3776
- Released: October 28, 2015
- Recorded: 2015
- Genre: Japanese Idol; art pop; alternative rock; progressive rock
- Length: 1:02:56
- Label: Natural Make
- Producer: Akira Ishida

3776 chronology
3776 wo Kikanai Riyuu ga Aru to Sureba (2015)	Saijiki (2019)

3776 wo Kikanai Riyuu ga Aru to Sureba (３７７６を聴かない理由があるとすれば, "If You Have Reason Not to Listen to 3776") is the first full-length studio album by Japanese Idol unit 3776, released on October 28, 2015.

The total duration of the album is 3776 seconds, which is the altitude of Mt. Fuji in meters. The concept is to climb Fuji with singer Chiyo Ide as a navigator.

== Reception ==
- Music writer Kazumi Nanba selected this album as the best Japanese idol album of 2015.
- Rock musician Yuusuke Koide said "When we talk about the best album of 2015, I say this is the best. Not only idol music, but also rock, pop... Some people say - for example - Adel is the best. But I say 3776's album is the best of all. If there are few people who agree with me, the reason is that few people have listened to this album."

== Live performances ==
- In July 2018, 3776 performed this album completely in Fujinomiya City and Tokyo.
- Live in Fujinomiya was released as DVD. In Tokyo was released as BD-R.
- On December 29, 2018, a video and live performance mix based on this album was performed at a movie theater in Shinjuku, Tokyo.

== Track listing ==
All tracks composed by Akira Ishida.

1. [Introduction]
2. "Noboranai Riyuu ga Aru to Sureba" (登らない理由があるとすれば)
3. [IntervalA]
4. "Mizu de Dekiteiru" (水でできている)
5. [IntervalB]
6. "Doukutsu Tanken" (洞窟探検)
7. "Hinan Keikaku to Bousai Goods" (避難計画と防災グッズ)
8. "Nihon Zenkoku Doko demo Fujisan" (日本全国どこでも富士山)
9. [IntervalC]
10. "Haru ga Kita" (春がきた)
11. "Wakutama ike Tayori" (湧玉池便り)
12. "Seito no Hongyou" (生徒の本業)
13. [IntervalD]
14. "Tabi Phot Selection" (旅ふぉとセレクション)
15. [IntervalE]
16. "Hachi Goume nya Mada Hayai" (八合目にゃまだ早い)
17. [IntervalF]
18. "Haru wa Meguru" (春は巡る)
19. 3.11
20. [Ending]

== Personnel ==
- Chiyono Ide - vocals
- Akira Ishida - guitars, programming, etc.
