= Saijiki (3776 album) =

Studio album by 3776
- Released: August 28, 2019
- Recorded: 2019
- Genre: Japanese Idol; art pop; progressive pop; experimental pop
- Length: 1:13:12
- Label: Natural Make
- Producer: Akira Ishida

3776 chronology
3776 wo Kikanai Riyuu ga Aru to Sureba (2015)	Saijiki (2019)	The Birth and Death of the Universe Through Mount Fuji (2024)

Saijiki (歳時記) is the second full-length studio album by Japanese Idol unit 3776 (Minanaro), released on August 28, 2019.

3776 initially had songs about the culture of the four seasons in Japan. Producer Akira Ishida mixed these songs with Japanese traditional children's songs and made the album resemble a DJ performance, as well as looping continuously. Throughout the album, main performer Chiyono Ide counts 365 days from January to December and 12 koku (Japanese old hour system), and a vocal loop of her chanting the zodiac is heard in the background. The title of each song means the month, the measure of rhythm, and the tonality.

== Live performances ==
- On August 15, 2019, 3776 had live based on this album. Akira Ishida played DJ, and Chiyono Ide sang and danced. Throughout the live, recorded voices counting 365 days from August 15 was playing.
- The live performance of "Hachijuuhachi Ya" (八十八夜) that was recorded in this album as "Satsuki Gobyoushi Ichouchou" (皐月五拍子イ調) is included on the BD-R, 3776 wo Kikanai Riyuu ga Aru to Sureba, Saigen Oneman Live, Tokyo-hen.
- The live performances of "Shougatsu wa Eemonda" (正月はええもんだ) that was recorded in this album as "Mutsuki Ichibyoushi Hechouchou" (睦月一拍子へ調) and "Hachijuuhachi Ya" (八十八夜) are included on the DVD, Dynamics eno Izanai, Dai Gokai 3776 Oneman Live, Atsusa Samusa mo 3776 Oneman Live made!.

== Related product ==
- On September 24, 2019, the product related to this album, "Saijiki Calendar 2020" (「歳時記」カレンダー2020) was released.

== Track listing ==
All tracks composed by Akira Ishida mixed with traditional songs.

1. "Mutsuki Ichibyoushi Hechouchou" (睦月一拍子へ調)
2. "Kisaragi Nibyoushi Eihechouchou" (如月二拍子嬰へ調)
3. "Yatoi Sanbyoushi Tochouchou" (弥生三拍子ト調)
4. "Uduki Yonbyoushi Eitochouchou" (卯月四拍子嬰ト調)
5. "Satsuki Gobyoushi Ichouchou" (皐月五拍子イ調)
6. "Minatsuki Rokubyoushi Eiichou" (水無月六拍子嬰イ調)
7. "Humiduki Nanabyoushi Rochouchou" (文月七拍子ロ調)
8. "Haduki Hachibyoushi Hachou" (葉月八拍子ハ調)
9. "Nagatsuki Kubyoushi Eihachou" (長月九拍子嬰ハ調)
10. "Kannaduki Juubyoushi Nichou" (神無月十拍子二調)
11. "Shimotsuki Juuichibyoushi Einichou" (霜月十一拍子嬰二調)
12. "Shiwasu Juunibyoushi Hochou" (師走十二拍子ホ調)

== Personnel ==
- Chiyono Ide - vocals
- Akira Ishida - guitars, programming, etc.
