= World of Sleepers =

Studio album by Carbon Based Lifeforms
- Released: 2006
- Genre: Psybient, ambient
- Length: 1:19:30
- Label: Ultimae Records

Carbon Based Lifeforms chronology
Hydroponic Garden (2003)	World of Sleepers (2006)	Irdial (EP) (2008)

World of Sleepers is the second studio album by Swedish ambient duo Carbon Based Lifeforms, released in 2006.

== Track listing ==
World of Sleepers starts at track 12, indicating that it is a continuation of Hydroponic Garden. All tracks are written by Johannes Hedberg and Daniel Ringström.

No.	Title	Length
12.	"Abiogenesis"	6:37
13.	"Vortex"	5:55
14.	"Photosynthesis"	5:41
15.	"Set Theory"	6:41
16.	"Gryning"	6:19
17.	"Transmission/Intermission"	4:28
18.	"World of Sleepers"	5:17
19.	"Proton/Electron"	6:44
20.	"Erratic Patterns"	6:55
21.	"Flytta Dig"	5:09
22.	"Betula Pendula"	10:50
23.	"Mechanism (Hidden Track)"	8:08

== See also ==
- Drake equation referenced in the track Abiogenesis.
