= The Interloper: Lee Harvey Oswald Inside the Soviet Union =

2013 book by Peter Savodnik

The Interloper
- First edition
- Author: Peter Savodnik
- Language: English
- Subject: Lee Harvey Oswald
- Publisher: Basic Books
- Publication place: United States

The Interloper: Lee Harvey Oswald Inside the Soviet Union is a 2013 book by Peter Savodnik, published by Basic Books. The book focuses on the nearly three years Lee Harvey Oswald spent in the Soviet Union. Savodnik attempts to figure out the motives behind Oswald killing John F. Kennedy. Savodnik calls Oswald an interloper, someone who flees "from his old life and [inserts] himself into a new one adorned with new people and a new landscape and a new language or accent – with the hope that this time he might find a permanent home."

== Background ==
Oswald moved twenty times by the time he was 17 years old. The longest he lived anywhere was four years in Fort Worth, Texas.
