= Hydroponic Garden (album) =

Studio album by Carbon Based Lifeforms
- Released: 25 June 2003
- Genre: Ambient, psybient, chill-out
- Length: 1:16:27
- Label: Ultimae Records

Carbon Based Lifeforms chronology
The Path (1998)	Hydroponic Garden (2003)	World of Sleepers (2006)

Hydroponic Garden is the first studio album by Swedish ambient duo Carbon Based Lifeforms, released in 2003.

== Track listing ==
All music by Johannes Hedberg and Daniel Ringström.

No.	Title	Length
1.	"Central Plains"	8:08
2.	"Tensor"	5:43
3.	"MOS 6581"	7:11
4.	"Silent Running"	7:05
5.	"Neurotransmitter"	7:28
6.	"Hydroponic Garden"	9:12
7.	"Exosphere"	5:05
8.	"Comsat"	7:08
9.	"Epicentre"	5:57
10.	"Artificial Island"	5:11
11.	"Refraction 1.33"	8:19
