= 3776 =

Japanese idol girl band

- Origin: Shizuoka, Japan
- Genres: J-pop; art pop; post-punk; alternative rock; jazz; shoegaze
- Years active: 2013–present
- Label: Natural Make
- Members: Chiyono Ide
- Past members: Mari Mitsumoto; Rena Mochizuki; Seina Hara; Yuika Taki; Sakura Suzuki; Hina Saito; Rina Nakahara

3776 (pronounced Minanaro) is a Japanese idol group themed after Mount Fuji, Japan's tallest mountain. The name is derived from the height of the mountain: 3,776 meters.

The group has received critical acclaim for their musicianship and DIY ethos.

== History ==
=== TEAM MII ===
Inspired by AKB48, Akira Ishida - who would later become the producer of 3776 - decided to launch a local idol group. Ishida sent e-mails to city offices all over Japan. One of the cities he included in his letters was Fujinomiya, a city in Shizuoka prefecture. A city official in Fujinomiya, which was celebrating its 60th anniversary, had already been considering creating an idol group under the project name Waga Machi no AKB (Our town's AKB) in commemoration of the town when he received Ishida's letter. Upon receiving the letter he requested a demo of Ishida's music. After hearing the demo he promptly requested that Ishida become the producer of his idol group. Auditions were held to determine the group's lineup: Waga Machi no AKB audition participants were judged on dancing to a song by AKB48. After the audition 24 members were selected to make up the group, which Ishida named TEAM MII after NMB48's Team M.

TEAM MII debuted on June 2, 2012, with the debut song "Yappari Kimi wa Sousa Bacchirisa". Because it was created by the city office, many limitations were placed on the group. They were allowed to perform only in Fujinomiya City, and weren't allowed to sell any goods or CDs. From the beginning their contract was only for one year, after which they were to disband.

For one year Ishida worked to create 9 songs, 8 of which were performed. The city office stopped Ishida from performing the song "Yuurei Shoutengai" (Ghost Shopping District) since they felt that the song's title and lyrics were inappropriate, and asked Ishida to change the name to "Gambare Shoutengai" (Cheer Up! Shopping District). Because Ishida refused to amend his song, "Yuurei Shoutengai" was not even practiced by the members. The theme of the song is actually satirical and sympathetic to the situation of Fujinomiya's shopping district, which began to decline after the large shopping retailer AEON opened in 2001, forcing many stores in Fujinomiya to close.

TEAM MII disbanded on March 24, 2013. 3 EPs, "Yappari Kimi wa Sousa Bacchirisa", "Minna no Fujinomiya Yakisoba", and "Wakatteyo nee Sensei" were released on April 27, 2013, after they had already parted ways.

=== 3776 Season#1 ===
Once their contract was terminated, some of the members desiring to continue the idol group asked Ishida to continue as their producer. In response to their requests Ishida started 3776 on July 22, 2013, when Mt. Fuji was registered as a world heritage site. The group's name was derived from the altitude of Mt. Fuji, 3776 meters. The group consisted of 7 members; Mari Mitsumoto, Seina Hara, Yuika Taki, Rena Mochizuki, Sakura Suzuki, Rina Nakahara, and Hina Saito, all of whom were former TEAM MII members.

3776 debuted their first song "Watashi no Sekaiisan" (My World Heritage) at a ceremony held by the Fujinomiya city office celebrating Mt. Fuji's registration as a world heritage site. The song poked fun at people who were carried away with the prestige of Mt Fuji receiving "World Heritage Site" status, promoting the idea that the true value of something is unchangeable whether recognized by an authority or not.

Because Seina Hara, Yuika Taki and Rina Nakahara left the group successively, Ishida declared 3776 Season#1 to be over in October.

"Watashi no Sekaiisan" was released attributed to 3776 Season#1 on December 22, 2013, despite the fact that season 3776 Season#2 had already begun.

=== 3776 Season#2 ===
On November 2, 2013, Chiyono Ide joined the group. 3776 Season#2 started and on November 4, 2013, Sakura Suzuki left the group. 3776 Season#2 consisted of Rena Mochizuki, Mari Mitsumoto, Hina Saito, and Chiyono Ide. They performed their new songs "Moe Moe Kataomoi" and "Mi ni Kite" on November 2, 2013. In January 2014, Sumire Kondo became a member of 3770 (3776's group to train new talent, becoming the first member to join 3776). She was the first member of 3776 who didn't also formerly belong to Team MII. They released EPs "Jokyoku" and "Shinpai no Tane" on June 22, 2014. Right after the release, Rena Mochizuki and Hina Saito left the group and Mari Mitsumoto also stated that she would leave the group in the near future. Ishida declared 3776 Season#2 to be over and 3776 Season#2+ to have begun on July 30, 2014.

=== 3776Season#2+ ===
Due to the sudden withdrawal of 3776's then most popular member Rena Mochizuki, and Mari Mitsumoto's plan to leave the group, Ishida added trainee Sumire to 3776 and changed 3776 Season#2 to 3776 Season#2+. The members consisted of Mari Mitsumoto, Chiyono Ide and Sumire Kondo (3770). At first, they planned to recruit new members for 3770 and when 3770 reached 6 members, 3776 Season#4 would start.

3776 Season#2+ was active, performing in tandem with 3776 Season#3 until February 2015 when Mari Mitsumoto left the group. New songs for Season#2+ were not created.

=== 3776 Season#3 ===
Further resignations from leading members forced Ishida to start 3776 Season#3 as Chiyono Ide's solo project. 3776 Season#3 started on August 8, 2014. The Season#3 EP "Love Letter" was released on December 28, 2014. Then the online music distribution website OTOTOY started offering "Love Letter" and TEAM MII's "Yappari Kimi wa Sousa Bacchirisa", "Minna no Fujinomiya Yakisoba", and "Wakatteyo nee Sensei" for download, all previously only available on CD. Following this, OTOTOY began to build up many different corporate relationships with 3776, and eventually digitally released all of their previous CDs.

On April 26, 2015, Chiyono Ide played their 4 new songs "Haru ga Kita", "Hachi Goume nya Mada Hayai", "Noboranai Riyuu ga Aru to Sureba", and "3.11" which were defined as being 3776 Season#3.1. A music video for "3.11" was made and edited exclusively by Akira Ishida. The song's theme was the 2011 Great Touhoku earthquake and the tsunami which followed. 3.11 became 3776's most famous song to date.

On the day of the debut of 3776 Season#3.1, 3776's official Twitter account released a statement saying that until 3776 Season#3 had accomplished all of the things they could do in a solo style, 3776 Season#3 would continue. As a result, the trainees in 3770 were changed into their own new group, Mi-II (from "Team Minanaro II"), which would cover all of 3776 and TEAM MII's older music.

On July 11, 2015, 3776 had their first "one man show" live concert in Tokyo named "Hinan Keikaku to One-man Live" (Plan for evacuation and one man live). At the concert, they started to sell 3.11 as their first single, and Mari Mitsumoto returned as a special guest.

On December 12, 2015, they released their full-length album "3776 wo Kikanai Riyuu ga Aru to Sureba" (If there were a reason to not listen to 3776). It received high acclaim from critics and musicians alike and became their first commercially successful CD.

Later, in July 2018 they performed this album completely 5 times. Two lives in Fujinomiya City were released as one DVD. One live in Tokyo was released as BD-R.

=== "Bon to 3776 ga Issho ni Kuruyo" and "Mousugu Koukou Seikatsu" (Chiyono Ide Solo Project) ===
At their third "one man show" live concert at Shinjuku Loft named "Bon to 3776 ga Issho ni Kuruyo" (Bon festival and 3776 come together), they performed their Top 5 most famous songs as voted on by their fans. During the performance, Chiyono Ide, performing as 3776Season#3, announced to the crowd that a guest would be performing. She called for the guest to come out and then having changed clothes emerged as the guest as a solo idol. She performed 5 songs and afterward announced 3 things. Firstly, that she would embark on a solo career while continuing to perform with 3776, secondly, that she would release her debut solo album titled "Mousugu Koukou Seikatsu", and thirdly, that 3776 would hold an audition for 3776Season#4. It was later announced that her album Mousugu-Koukouseikatsu would be released on the music distribution website ototoy.jp on August 22, 2016, and would subsequently be released on CD on September 28.

=== 3776 Season#4 ===
In the 4th quarter of 2016 auditions were held for the potential 3776Season#4. The end of 3776 Season#3's live concert on January 7, 2017, marked the beginning of a period of hiatus for 3776, taken for the purpose of affording Chiyono Ide the time to sufficiently concentrate on her preparatory studies for high school entrance exams. On May 3, 2017, an event will be held in Fujinomiya city at the city cultural center with the dual purpose of officially ending the period of hiatus as well as either marking the beginning of 3776Season#4 or the beginning of 3776 Season#3 Neo depending on whether or not any participants survive the audition process. (If new members are added after passing auditions it will become 3776Season#4 and if not then it will become 3776 Season#3 Neo.)

On May 3, 2017, 3776 started Season#4 with the addition of a new member, Aina Hirose. But she left 3776 on April 8, 2018, and Season#4 has been suspended to date.

=== 3776 Season#3 Neo and 3776 Extended ===
Currently, 3776 has two styles, "3776 Season#3 Neo" and "3776 Extended". Season#3 Neo is the same as Season#3. 3776 Extended is a style in which Chiyino Ide and producer Akira Ishida play while creating sound.

In addition to them, "Chiyono Ide" solo project continues too.

== Discography ==
#		Title	Release date		
1	TEAM MII	"Yappari Kimi wa Sousa Bacchirisa" (やっぱり君はそうさバッチリさ)	April 28, 2013 (CD); December 29, 2014 (OTOTOY)	NAMA-0001	1."Yappari Kimi wa Sousa Bacchirisa" (やっぱり君はそうさバッチリさ); 2."Yappari Kimi tomo Sonouchi Bye Bye" (やっぱり君ともそのうちバイバイ); 3. "Wakutama ike Tayori" (湧玉池便り); 4."Mo Chotto Onna no Ko" (も☆ちょっと女の子); 5."Yappari Kimi wa Sousa Bacchirisa"[Instrumental] (やっぱり君はそうさバッチリさ[Instrumental]); 6."Yappari Kimi tomo Sonouchi Bye Bye"[Instrumental] (やっぱり君ともそのうちバイバイ[Instrumental]); 7. "Wakutama ike Tayori"[Instrumental] (湧玉池便り[Instrumental]); 8."Mo Chotto Onna no Ko"[Instrumental] (も☆ちょっと女の子[Instrumental])
2	TEAM MII	"Minna no Fujinomiya Yakisoba" (みんなの富士宮やきそば)	April 28, 2013 (CD); December 29, 2014 (OTOTOY)	NAMA-0002	1."Minna no Fujinomiya Yakisoba" (みんなの富士宮やきそば); 2."Yuru Meter" (ゆるメーター); 3."Yuurei Shoutengai" (ゆうれい商店街); 4."Minna no Fujinomiya Yakisoba"[Instrumental] (みんなの富士宮やきそば[Instrumental]); 5."Yuru Meter"[Instrumental] (ゆるメーター[Instrumental]); 6."Yuurei Shoutengai"[Instrumental] (ゆうれい商店街[Instrumental])
3	TEAM MII	"Wakatteyo nee Sensei" (わかってよねえ先生)	April 28, 2013 (CD); December 29, 2014 (OTOTOY)	NAMA-0003	1."Wakatteyo nee Sensei" (わかってよねえ先生); 2."Notebook no Watashi" (ノートブックの私); 3."Kosobayuina" (こそばゆいな); 4."Wakatteyo nee Sensei"[Instrumental] (わかってよねえ先生[Instrumental]); 5."Notebook no Watashi"[Instrumental] (ノートブックの私[Instrumental]); 6."Kosobayuina"[Instrumental] (こそばゆいな[Instrumental])
4	3776 Season#1	"Watashi no Sekaiisan" (私の世界遺産)	December 22, 2013 (initial release); March 30, 2016 (repress)	NAMA-0004	1.mi-na-na-RockII; 2."Watashi no Sekaiisan" (私の世界遺産); 3."Kimi to Issho ni Noboritai" (君と一緒に登りたい); 4."Daihunka wa Ikaga?" (大噴火はいかが?); 5."Kokemomo" (コケモモ); 6."Watashi no Sekaiisan"[Instrumental] (私の世界遺産[Instrumental]); 7."Kimi to Issho ni Noboritai"[Instrumental] (君と一緒に登りたい[Instrumental]); 8."Daihunka wa Ikaga?"[Instrumental] (大噴火はいかが?[Instrumental]); 9."Kokemomo"[Instrumental] (コケモモ[Instrumental])
5	3776 Season#2	"Shinpai no Tane" (心配のタネ)	June 22, 2014	NAMA-0005	1."Shinpai no Tane" (心配のタネ); 2."Moe Moe Kataomoi" (もぇもぇ片想い); 3."Neutral" (ニュートラル); 4.Neutral -bossa style- 5."Shinpai no Tane[Instrumental]" (心配のタネ[Instrumental]); 6."Moe Moe Kataomoi[Instrumental]" (もぇもぇ片想い[Instrumental]); 7."Neutral[Instrumental]" (ニュートラル[Instrumental])
6	3776 Season#2	"Jokyoku" (序曲)	June 22, 2014	NAMA-0006	1."Jokyoku" (序曲); 2."Mi ni Kite!" (みにきて!); 3."Sayonara Syougakusei" (さよなら小学生); 4. "Minanaro Gekijou Watashi wa Sekaiisan" (～みななろ劇場～『私は世界遺産』); 5."Jokyoku"[Instrumental] (序曲[Instrumental]); 6."Mi ni Kite!"[Instrumental] (みにきて![Instrumental]); 7."Sayonara Syougakusei"[Instrumental] (さよなら小学生[Instrumental])
7	3776 Season#3	Love Letter (ラブレター)	December 28, 2014	NAMA-0007	1."Ondanshitsujun Yama Girl" (温暖湿潤山ガール); 2."Digital Native" (デジタルネイティヴ); 3."Dareka no Mono desu" (誰かのモノです); 4.A∩B; 5."Jikuu Love Letter ~After Daihunka no Sekai no Kimi e" (時空ラブレター～アフター大噴火の世界の君へ～); 6."Ondanshitsujun Yama Girl"[Instrumental] (温暖湿潤山ガール[Instrumental]); 7."Digital Native"[Instrumental] (デジタルネイティヴ[Instrumental]); 8."Dareka no Mono desu"[Instrumental] (誰かのモノです[Instrumental]); 9.A∩B[Instrumental] 10."Jikuu Love Letter ~After Daihunka no Sekai no Kimi e -Radio Edit-"[Instrumental] (時空ラブレター～アフター大噴火の世界の君へ～ -Radio Edit-[Instrumental]); 11."Kotae Awase" ((答え合わせ))
8	3776 Season#3	3.11 (3.11, San ten Ichi Ichi)	July 11, 2015	NAMA-0009	1.3.11; 2."Hinan Keikaku to Bousai Goods" (避難計画と防災グッズ); 3.3.11[Instrumental] 4."Hinan Keikaku to Bousai Goods"[Instrumental] (避難計画と防災グッズ[Instrumental])
9	3776 Season#3	"3776 wo Kikanai Riyuu ga Aru to Sureba" (３７７６を聴かない理由があるとすれば)	October 28, 2015	NAMA-0010	1.[Introduction] 2."Noboranai Riyuu ga Aru to Sureba" (登らない理由があるとすれば); 3.[IntervalA] 4."Mizu de Dekiteiru" (水でできている) [IntervalB] 6."Doukutsu Tanken" (洞窟探検); 7."Hinan Keikaku to Bousai Goods" (避難計画と防災グッズ); 8."Nihon Zenkoku Doko demo Fujisan" (日本全国どこでも富士山); 9.[IntervalC] 10."Haru ga Kita" (春がきた); 11."Wakutama ike Tayori" (湧玉池便り); 12."Seito no Hongyou" (生徒の本業); 13.[IntervalD] 14."Tabi Phot Selection" (旅ふぉとセレクション); 15.[IntervalE] 16."Hachi Goume nya Mada Hayai" (八合目にゃまだ早い); 17.[IntervalF] 18."Haru wa Meguru" (春は巡る); 19.3.11; 20.[Ending]
10	TEAM MII	"TEAM MII Zenkyokusyuu" (TEAM MII 全曲集)	December 30, 2015	NAMA-0011	1."Yappari Kimi wa Sousa Bacchirisa" (やっぱり君はそうさバッチリさ); 2."Yappari Kimi tomo Sonouchi Bye Bye" (やっぱり君ともそのうちバイバイ); 3. "Wakutama ike Tayori" (湧玉池便り); 4."Mo Chotto Onna no Ko" (も☆ちょっと女の子); 5."Minna no Fujinomiya Yakisoba" (みんなの富士宮やきそば); 6."Yuru Meter" (ゆるメーター); 7."Yuurei Shoutengai" (ゆうれい商店街); 8."Wakatteyo nee Sensei" (わかってよねえ先生); 9."Notebook no Watashi" (ノートブックの私); 10."Kosobayuina" (こそばゆいな)
11	3776 Extended	"Boku Dake no Happy End" (僕だけのハッピーエンド)	June 15, 2016 (OTOTOY)	NAMA-S012	1."Boku Dake no Happy End" (僕だけのハッピーエンド); 2."Boku Dake no Happy End[Instrumental]" (僕だけのハッピーエンド[Instrumental])
12	Chiyono Ide	"Mousugu Koukou Seikatsu" (もうすぐ高校生活)	August 22, 2016 (OTOTOY); September 28, 2016 (CD)	NAMA-0013	1."Mousugu Koukou Seikatsu ~Introduction" (もうすぐ高校生活～Introduction); 2."Heart no Gosenhu" (ハートの五線譜); 3."Taichou Kanri no Tame ni" (体調管理のために); 4."Galko Dai Pinchi!" (ギャル子大ピンチ!); 5."Card Reader" (カードリーダー); 6."Taihuu Ikka" (台風一過); 7."Jugyou wa Kyou mo" (授業は今日も); 8."Radio Name" (ラジオネーム); 9."Bukatsu Intai no Tsugi ni Suru Koto" (部活引退の次にすること); 10."Saraba Koukou Seikatsu" (さらば高校生活)
13	3776 Season#3	"Saijiki DaiIkkan" (歳時記・第一巻)	November 24, 2016 (OTOTOY)	NAMA-S014	1."Syougatsu wa Eemonda" (正月はええもんだ); 2."Merry Christmas & Happy New Year" (メリークリスマス&ハッピーニューイヤー); 3."Bonuta Ondo" (盆唄音頭); 4."Merry Christmas & Happy New Year"[Instrumental] (メリークリスマス&ハッピーニューイヤー[Instrumental])
14	3776 Extended	"Sokkyoukyokusyuu Daiissyuu" (即興曲集第一集)	March 27, 2017	NAMA-0015	1."Sokkyoukyoku 150208" (即興曲 150208); 2."Sokkyoukyoku 150321" (即興曲 150321); 3."Sokkyoukyoku 150405" (即興曲 150405); 4."Sokkyoukyoku 150418" (即興曲 150418); 5."Sokkyoukyoku 150419" (即興曲 150419); 6."Sokkyoukyoku Drone ~Fuji Shinkou 160116" (即興曲「ドローン～富士信仰」 160116); 7."Sokkyoukyoku 160116" (即興曲 160116); 8."Sokkyoukyoku 160615" (即興曲 160615); 9."Sokkyoukyoku 160629" (即興曲 160629); 10."Sokkyoukyoku 160713" (即興曲 160713); 11."Sokkyoukyoku 160727" (即興曲 160727); 12."Sokkyoukyoku 160810" (即興曲 160810); 13."Sokkyoukyoku 160824" (即興曲 160824); 14."Sokkyoukyoku 160907" (即興曲 160907); 15."Sokkyoukyoku 160921" (即興曲 160921); 16."Sokkyoukyoku 161012" (即興曲 161012); 17."Sokkyoukyoku 161026" (即興曲 161026); 18."Sokkyoukyoku 161109" (即興曲 161109); 19."Sokkyoukyoku 161123" (即興曲 161123); 20."Sokkyoukyoku 161207" (即興曲 161207); 21."Sokkyoukyoku 161221" (即興曲 161221)
15	3776 Season#4	"Koukaijikken, Yamanashiban" (公開実験《山梨版》)	June 28, 2017	NAMA-0016	1."Watashi no Mono Desu! Yamanashiban" (私のものです！《山梨版》); 2."Mou Chotto Oyasumi Yamanashiban" (もうちょっとおやすみ《山梨版》); 3."Momo to Shirasu no Uta Yamanashiban" (桃としらすの歌《山梨版》); 4."Mienai Yamanashiban" (見えない《山梨版》); 5."Watashi no Mono Desu! Yamanashiban"[Instrumental] (私のものです！《山梨版》[Instrumental]); 6."Mou Chotto Oyasumi Yamanashiban"[Instrumental] (もうちょっとおやすみ《山梨版》[Instrumental]); 7."Momo to Shirasu no Uta Yamanashiban"[Instrumental] (桃としらすの歌《山梨版》[Instrumental]); 8."Mienai Yamanashiban"[Instrumental] (見えない《山梨版》[Instrumental])
16	3776 Season#4	"Koukaijikken, Shizuokaban" (公開実験《静岡版》)	June 28, 2017	NAMA-0017	1."Watashi no Mono Desu! Shizuokaban" (私のものです！《静岡版》); 2."Mou Chotto Oyasumi Shizuokaban" (もうちょっとおやすみ《静岡版》); 3."Momo to Shirasu no Uta Shizuokaban" (桃としらすの歌《静岡版》); 4."Mienai Shizuokaban" (見えない《静岡版》); 5."Watashi no Mono Desu! Shizuokaban"[Instrumental] (私のものです！《静岡版》[Instrumental]); 6."Mou Chotto Oyasumi Shizuokaban"[Instrumental] (もうちょっとおやすみ《静岡版》[Instrumental]); 7."Momo to Shirasu no Uta Shizuokaban"[Instrumental] (桃としらすの歌《静岡版》[Instrumental]); 8."Mienai Shizuokaban"[Instrumental] (見えない《静岡版》[Instrumental])
17	3776 Season#4	"Koukaijikken, LINK MIX" (公開実験《LINK MIX》)	August 30, 2017	NAMA-0018	1."Mienai, LINK MIX, Case of ITOU YOSHINORI" (見えない《LINK MIX》Case of イトウヨシノリ); 2."Momo to Shirasu no Uta, LINK MIX, Case of S.A.L. as ROMANTIC PRODUCTION" (桃としらすの歌《LINK MIX》 Case of S.A.L. as ROMANTIC PRODUCTION); 3."Mienai, LINK MIX, Case of OTONARISOUND" (見えない《LINK MIX》 Case of OTONARISOUND); 4."Mou Chotto Oyasumi, LINK MIX, Case of NISHINAKAJIMA KINAKO" (もうちょっとおやすみ《LINK MIX》 Case of 西中島きなこ); 5."Momo to Shirasu no Uta, LINK MIX, Case of HIROSHI/SEMASHI" (桃としらすの歌《LINK MIX》 Case of ひろし/せまし); 6."Watashi no Mono Desu!, LINK MIX, Case of skddj" (私のものです！《LINK MIX》 Case of skddj); 7."Mienai, LINK MIX, Case of HUKAWO" (見えない《LINK MIX》 Case of フカヲ); 8."Watashi no Mono Desu!, LINK MIX, Case of NAOE MASAHIRO" (私のものです！《LINK MIX》 Case of 直枝政広); 9."Mou Chotto Oyasumi, LINK MIX, Case of OKITE PORSCHE" (もうちょっとおやすみ《LINK MIX》 Case of 掟ポルシェ); 10."Momo to Shirasu no Uta, LINK MIX, Case of motan" (桃としらすの歌《LINK MIX》 Case of motan); 11."Mienai, LINK MIX, Case of NAGATA SOUICHIROU" (見えない《LINK MIX》 Case of 永田壮一郎)
18	3776 Season#3	"Saijiki" (歳時記)	August 28, 2019	NAMA-0031	1."Mutsuki Ichibyoushi Hechouchou" (睦月一拍子へ調); 2."Kisaragi Nibyoushi Eihechouchou" (如月二拍子嬰へ調); 3."Yatoi Sanbyoushi Tochouchou" (弥生三拍子ト調); 4."Uduki Yonbyoushi Eitochouchou" (卯月四拍子嬰ト調); 5."Satsuki Gobyoushi Ichouchou" (皐月五拍子イ調); 6."Minatsuki Rokubyoushi Eiichou" (水無月六拍子嬰イ調); 7."Humiduki Nanabyoushi Rochouchou" (文月七拍子ロ調); 8."Haduki Hachibyoushi Hachou" (葉月八拍子ハ調); 9."Nagatsuki Kubyoushi Eihachou" (長月九拍子嬰ハ調); 10."Kannaduki Juubyoushi Nichou" (神無月十拍子二調); 11."Shimotsuki Juuichibyoushi Einichou" (霜月十一拍子嬰二調); 12."Shiwasu Juunibyoushi Hochou" (師走十二拍子ホ調)

== Video albums ==
List of video albums
Title	Album details
3776 Live ni Ikanai Riyuu ga Aru to Sureba (3776ライブに行かない理由があるとすれば)	Released: March 27, 2016; Label: Natural Make; Format: Blu-ray
Bon to 3776 ga Issho ni Kuruyo (盆と3776が一緒に来るよ！)	Released: March 7, 2017; Label: Natural Make; Format: Blu-ray
3776 wo Kikanai Riyuu ga Aru to Sureba, Saigen Oneman Live, Hujinomiya-hen (「3776を聴かない理由があるとすれば」再現ワンマン・ライブ《富士宮編》)	Released: October 20, 2018; Label: Livecinema; Format: DVD
3776 wo Kikanai Riyuu ga Aru to Sureba, Saigen Oneman Live, Tokyo-hen (「3776を聴かない理由があるとすれば」再現ワンマン・ライブ《東京編》)	Released: March 21, 2019; Label: Natural Make; Format: Blu-ray
Dynamics eno Izanai, Dai Gokai 3776 Oneman Live, Atsusa Samusa mo 3776 Oneman Live made! (ダイナミクスへの誘い 第五回3776ワンマンライブ 暑さ寒さも3776ワンマンライブまで！)	Released: November 24, 2019; Label: Livecinema; Format: DVD

== Filmography ==
- "LOCO DD Nihon Zenkoku Dokodemo Idol" (「LOCO DD 日本全国どこでもアイドル」) (2017)
