= Carbon Based Lifeforms =

Swedish electronic music duo

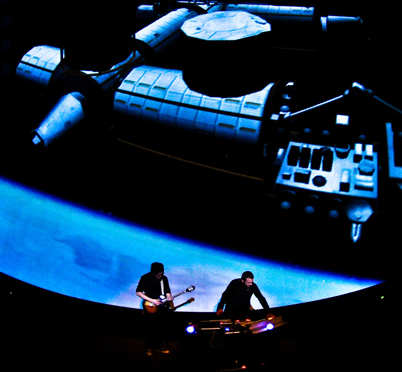
- Carbon Based Lifeforms performing in the Cosmonova of the Swedish Museum of Natural History in Stockholm in 2009

Background information
- Origin: Gothenburg, Sweden
- Genres: Ambient; downtempo; IDM; psybient; chill-out
- Years active: 1996–present
- Labels: Ultimae (former); Blood Music (former); Leftfield Records
- Members: Johannes Hedberg; Daniel Vadestrid
- Website: www.carbonbasedlifeforms.net

Carbon Based Lifeforms is a Swedish electronic music duo formed in Gothenburg in 1996 by Johannes Hedberg and Daniel Vadestrid (né Ringström and formerly Segerstad). They are also members of the synthpop band Thermostatic.

== History ==
=== Formation and early period ===
Hedberg and Ringström (both born in 1976) first met in 1991 when they were 15 years old, after the former was transferred to the same class as Ringström. They became friends, and shared similar tastes in music, films, and video games. They started collaborating on the music tracker sequencer software Protracker and later, the Amiga computer system. In 1994, they started to work with PCs and formed a music tracker trio with fellow Swedish musician and producer Mikael Lindqvist called Bassment Studios. In the following year, they moved once more to MIDI-oriented music and formed Notch, a group focusing on acid, techno, and house music. Their first physical release was a remix of "What Would You Think" by synthpop group Mourning After.

Lindqvist soon parted ways and Notch discontinued, but encouraged Hedberg and Ringström to continue recording their own music. The pair had started to fully explore ambient music after Hedberg's sister had picked up Orgship (1994) by Solar Quest, which quickly became a favourite of theirs and influenced the two to make similar music. Electronic bands The Future Sound of London and Boards of Canada were also a big influence on them; Vadestrid called them "our role models". After initial tracks were put together still under their Notch moniker, the duo wished to explore the genre further by incorporating drone and chill out elements. This led to the formation of their own identity, Carbon Based Lifeforms, in 1996, initially as a side project. They named themselves after a Notch demo album, and thought it fitted "with our underlying themes of the combination of biology and technology, also it alludes to a lot of sci-fi concepts."

The band had built a following as Notch on MP3.com and Last.fm, but accumulated a bigger one as Carbon Based Lifeforms which led to increased exposure from radio airplay. When Last.fm switched from Winamp to another media player, the band saw a boost in traffic which also increased their income. Much of their music from their early period relied on delay and filter effects, and simpler sounds than their later tracks.

=== Signing with Ultimae and studio albums ===
In 2002, the band signed a record deal with French label Ultimae Records after the label discovered them on MP3.com. Vadestrid said that the deal boosted their profile as a result, and the band started to perform at trance festivals during a time where it was uncommon for ambient acts to be on the big stage. Hedberg called the group's early years as "rough" partly due to his fear of flying which he did not conquer until 2009, which left Vadestrid to often perform abroad by himself, sometimes accompanied with a live musician. The group's first live gigs took place in 2004. Vadestrid chose their performance at the 2006 Ozora Festival in Hungary as "something special" as the gig took place during a thunderstorm.

Their debut studio album, Hydroponic Garden, was released in 2003, followed by World of Sleepers in 2006. Vadestrid chose "Photosynthesis" from the latter as a track that contains all of the band's "key components". Released in 2010, Interloper was the album the group recalled as the turning point where they "grew big" as an act, and look back on the it as their defining moment. The follow-up, 2011's Twentythree, was originally finished in 2009 without beats, but the group became doubtful and self-critical about it and withheld its release. After discussing it with Ultimae, they produced a version with beats and put it out as Interloper, hence the title, and later on finished a full beatless album as Twentythree.

After about ten years with Ultimae, the band departed from the label to focus on digital releases and to achieve greater control over their music. They formed their own label, Leftfield Records, to handle the digital releases. In 2014, the band were approached by Blood Music which led to a record deal to release their albums on CD and for the first time, on vinyl, with updated artwork, leaving the band to handle the digital releases themselves. They had not released their albums on vinyl before because Ultimae were "too busy to bother" about the format, and that there was not a big enough demand. In 2015, the band remastered their first three studio albums with the aim of getting "a more coherent sound between them", and for bringing out more details in the music. Also that year, the band revealed that Spotify is their top source of income.

In 2017, the band released their first studio album in six years, Derelicts. They made the conscious decision to take elements from their first three albums that they enjoyed the most and develop new tracks from those ideas. It marked a development in their sound, as by now, they were almost exclusively working with hardware-based instruments and setups which gave the record a lo-fi quality. The album marked the band's first official music video release, for the track "Accede". Stochastic was released in 2021, and originated when the group started to test random functions on some old synthesisers, which produced musical ideas suited for "passive listening whilst not stealing focus." It developed further during lockdowns amidst the COVID-19 pandemic, during which both members started producing tracks separately. They agreed to explore drone music and developed tracks by exchanging files online and adding to what the other member had put down.

Their seventh studio album, Seeker, was released in June 2023. With the pandemic dying down, the group reunited and worked on music that, unlike the origins of Stochastic, had a more unified direction. This was followed by the band's first live album, Live at Ozora 2022, which features the band performing with a live drummer, guitarist, and bassist.

=== Other projects ===
From 2005 to 2009, the pair released music as their electropop outfit, Thermostatic.

In March 2022, Vadestrid announced that he had completed the first draft of a book about the history of the band with the working title The Path to Derelicts. The book was published under this title in early 2023. A second edition, featuring minor corrections and a revised cover, was released later that year.

Vadestrid also has his own solo project SYNC24.

== Band members ==
Carbon Based Lifeforms

- Johannes Hedberg – instruments, production (1996–present)
- Daniel Vadestrid – instruments, production (1996–present)

Live musicians

- Ester Nannmark (2014)
- Xerxes Andrén – drums (2022, 2024)
- Simon Welander – guitar (2022)
- Jonatan Ney – guitar (2024)
- Oscar Pahlm – bass guitar (2022, 2024)

== Discography ==
Studio albums

- The Path (1998, as their previous incarnation Notch. Released on MP3.com as The Phat #000001/The Phat #000002 as CBL. Released in 2018 as Carbon Based Lifeforms)
- Hydroponic Garden (2003)
- World of Sleepers (2006)
- Interloper (2010)
- Twentythree (2011)
- Derelicts (2017)
- Stochastic (2021)
- Seeker (2023)

Compilations

- ALT:01 (2016; collection of previously unreleased live tracks and remixes)
- ALT:02 (2020)

Soundtracks

- Refuge (film, 2013)
- SteamWorld Heist (video game, 2015)
- Spartaga (video game, 2017)

EPs

- Irdial (2008)
- VLA (2011)
- MOS 6581 Remixes (2016)
- Photosynthesis Remixes (2016)
- 20 Minutes (2021)

DJ mixes Regrouped compilations of other artists.

- Isolatedmix 23 (2011)

Live albums

- Live at Ozora 2022 (2023)
- Live at Ozora 2024 (2025)

=== Appearances ===
Album	Title	Year	Label
Albedo	"Digital Child"	2005	Ultimae Records
Ease Division 3	"Endospore"	2008	Spiral Trax
Enigmatic Dream	"Epicentre"	2011	RMG Records
Europe	"Vakna"	2015	A Strangely Isolated Place
Fahrenheit Project Part 3	"Metrosat 4"	2002	Ultimae Records
Fahrenheit Project Part 4	"Epicentre (Second Movement)" "Decompression"	2003	Ultimae Records
Fahrenheit Project Part 5	"T-Rex Echoes"	2005	Ultimae Records
Future Memories	"Reaktion"	2008	Interchill Records
Visions	"Carbon Based Lifeforms Vision"	2016	Mystic & Quantum
Save the Children	"Accede"	2023	Ensancha El Alma Records
