= Interloper (album) =

Studio album by Carbon Based Lifeforms
- Released: 2010
- Genre: Ambient
- Length: 1:11:44
- Label: Ultimae Records

Carbon Based Lifeforms chronology
| Irdial (2008) | Interloper (2010) | Twentythree (2011) |

Interloper is the third studio album by Swedish ambient duo Carbon Based Lifeforms, released in 2010.

== Track listing ==
Interloper starts at track 24, indicating it is a continuation of World of Sleepers.

| No. | Title | Length |
|---|---|---|
| 24. | "Interloper" | 6:00 |
| 25. | "Right Where It Ends" | 6:49 |
| 26. | "Central Plain" | 7:12 |
| 27. | "Supersede" | 8:00 |
| 28. | "Init" | 7:27 |
| 29. | "Euphotic" | 7:18 |
| 30. | "Frog" | 7:20 |
| 31. | "M" | 5:28 |
| 32. | "20 Minutes" | 7:26 |
| 33. | "Polyrytmi" | 8:44 |
