= Fingers in the Noise =

French electronic musician

- Born: Laurent Bisch; 28 January 1966 (age 60)
- Origin: Nîmes, France
- Genres: Ambient, Dub, Experimental, Deep House, Dub techno, Minimalism
- Years active: 2009-present
- Members: Laurent Bisch
- Website: fingersinthenoise.com

Fingers in the Noise is the alias of French electronic musician Laurent Bisch.

Born in 1966, Bisch started producing music in the late 1980s, after taking several piano lessons. His musical genres include dub, ambient, and experimental music. Bisch is married, and has three children.

== Early life ==
Laurent Bisch was born in France on 28 January 1966. During the late 1980s, Bisch took several piano lessons, which inspired him to start creating his own music.

=== Music ===
Bisch developed a passion for deep dub and ambient music. He would also frequently spend his time at all-night parties. In 1990 he bought his first synthesizer, a Korg 01/WFD. It was a "workstation that introduced [him] to the creation of synthetic sounds". In 1995, Bisch bought his first personal computer. He discovered, and began to experiment with, software such as Cubase, FruityLoops, ACID Pro and ReBirth RB-338. Bisch stated in an interview: "The fact that I could work on a screen with all the tools and opportunities offered by this kind of software, I realized that I had found my happiness!". Bisch says that musical creation provides a form of therapy for him, and allows him to get over his problems. When he was 19, Bisch began discovering night life, and attended raves. He has also lived in the island of Ibiza and Tenerife (Canary island) for five years.

== Musical breakthrough ==
In 2009, Bisch decided to stop attending long all-night parties, and instead pursue a more peaceful family life with his wife and three children, after his mother died. He began devoting his free time towards musical composition, and has published some of his releases on websites like SoundCloud, MySpace, and Facebook. Bisch began releasing EPs during the year 2010, on various netlabels. That same year, he also founded his own record label, called Fitn Personal Records.

== Personal life ==
Apart from composing music, Bisch also enjoys cooking, working on 3D computer graphics, and photography.

== Discography ==
=== Studio albums ===
- 2011 - 3 x 11 (11/11/11) (Fitn Personal Records – FPR#002)
- 2012 - Sounds From the Moon (Bine Music)

=== EPs ===
- 2010 - Kool Reaktion
- 2010 - Smooth Box
- 2010 - Apero Beats
- 2010 - Abstract Shadows
- 2010 - Light as a Butterfly
- 2011 - Discret Lounge
- 2011 - Retroactive
- 2013 - Insomnia
- 2013 - Scotchage
- 2014 - Saw Deep

=== Remixes ===
- 2012 - Lost in Freezing Fog
