= Ultimae Records =

French record label

Ultimae Records is a Lyon-based record label founded by Aes Dana and Sandrine Gryson in 1999. They release and distribute various forms of ambient and trance music.

== History ==
In 1999, the band Asura prepared their first album, Code Eternity. Several labels showed interest, but none gave the green light and Vincent Villuis, one of the members of the group, decided to set up his own label.

== List of Ultimae Records artists ==
List of recording artists who currently or formerly recorded for Ultimae Records:

- Carbon Based Lifeforms
- Craig Padilla
- Fingers in the Noise
- Robert Rich
- Solar Fields
- Sync24
- Vibrasphere
